= Electricity sector in South Africa =

Electricity sector of South Africa
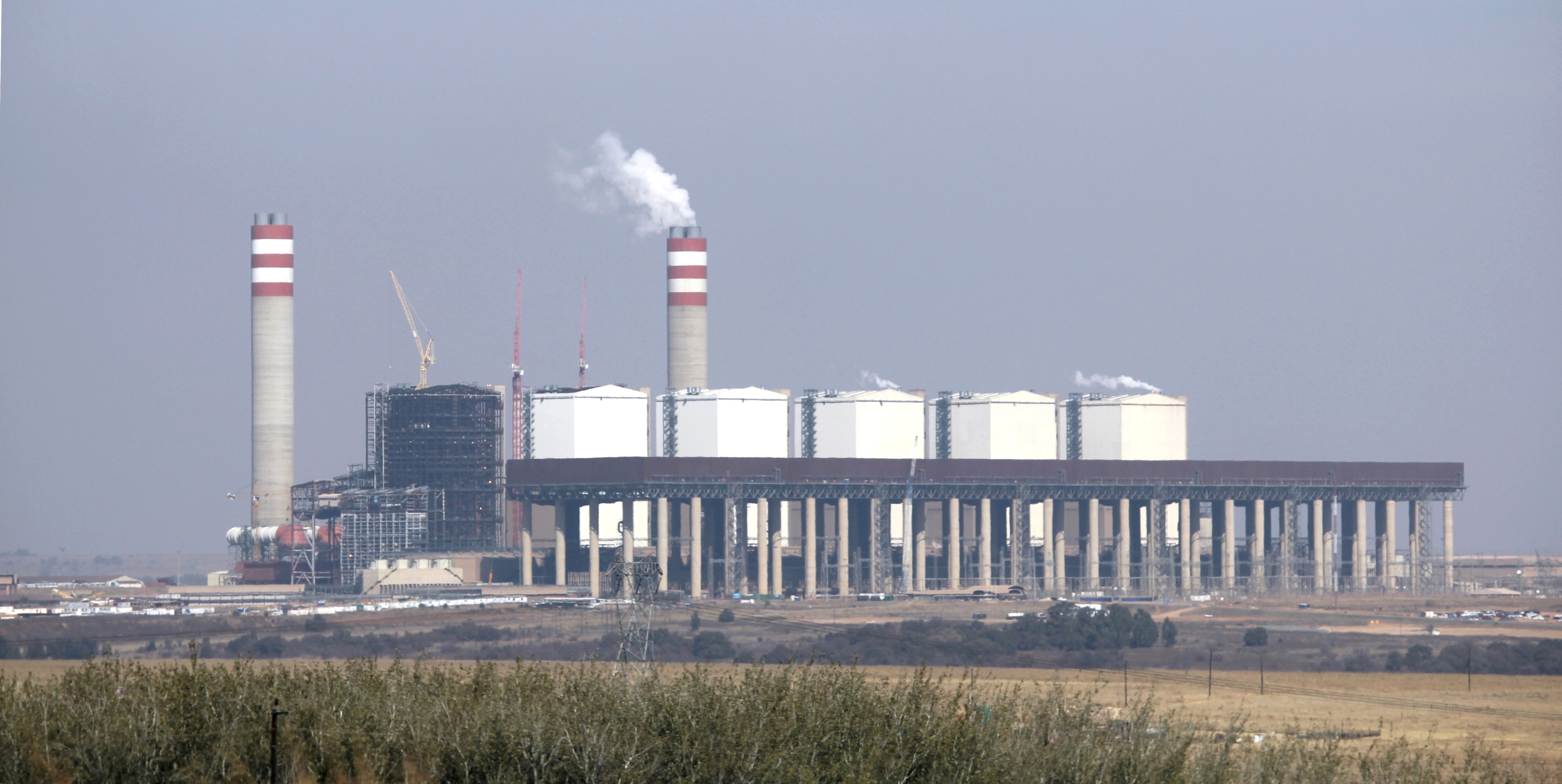
- Kusile Power Station, the 10th largest coal power station in the world

Data
- Electricity coverage: 87.7% (overall); 90.9% (urban) (2023)
- Installed capacity: 55.42 GW (nominal) (2024)
- Share of fossil energy: 62.5% (2025)
- Share of renewable energy: 32% (2025)
- GHG emissions from electricity generation: 394.06 Mt of CO_{2} (2023)
- Average electricity use: 3.25 MWh (2025)

South Africa's power generation by type of energy (2025)
1. Coal (58.0%)
2. Rooftop Solar (10.0%)
3. Grid-connected Solar (10.0%)
4. Wind (8.00%)
5. Diesel (4.50%)
6. Hydro (4.00%)
7. Nuclear (2.50%)
8. Other (4.00%)
South Africa's projected power generation by type of energy in 2039 *
1. Coal (27.0%)
2. Wind (24.0%)
3. Grid-connected Solar (18.0%)
4. Rooftop Solar (10.0%)
5. Diesel (4.50%)
6. Hydro (4.00%)
7. Nuclear (5.00%)
8. Other (7.50%)
* According to the country's approved Integrated Resource Plan (IRP). This does not factor in potential, unknown increases in property owner-driven rooftop solar

The Electricity sector in South Africa is an important part of energy in South Africa. Most power stations in South Africa are owned and operated by the state owned enterprise, Eskom. These plants account for 80% of all the electricity produced in South Africa, and 45% of all electricity produced on the African continent.

In 2024, South Africa generated 214,562 GWh of electricity. Coal remained the dominant source, accounting for 83% of generation, while renewable sources accounted for 9%. However, the country's energy sector is undergoing a transformation, and shifting towards the greater use of renewables, and a greater prevalence of independent power producers (IPPs).

In 2022, 12,300 GWh were exported to Eswatini, Botswana, Mozambique, Lesotho, Namibia, Zambia, Zimbabwe and other countries participating in the Southern African Power Pool.

In the same year, South Africa imported 10,800 GWh from the Cahora Bassa Hydroelectric Power Station in Mozambique via the 1,920 MW Cahora Bassa (HDVC) Power Transmission System.

South Africa's Integrated Resource Plan, passed by Parliament in its new form in 2025, aims to transform the country's energy sector, shifting generation away from coal, and towards a combination of renewable and nuclear energy. Representing a combined investment of R2.2 trillion, the IRP is set to add over 105,000 MW of new generation capacity by 2039. The plan was reaffirmed in August 2026, when the Minister of Electricity and Energy attended a conference in China, to pitch the IRP to potential investors.

After the event, the Minister announced that six Chinese companies were going ahead with plans to build factories for transmission infrastructure in Gauteng.

As more independent power producers enter the electricity sector, the share of non-Eskom power generation in South Africa continues to grow. In February 2026, non-Eskom electricity generation (mainly from renewable wind and solar plants) had grown by 20.4% year-over-year. In September 2026, the city of Cape Town was the first in South Africa to sign a power purchase agreement with an independent power producer (IPP), allowing the municipality to source energy outside of Eskom, and at competitive rates. The two solar projects that formed the first phase of the tender process will allow the city to source energy at around 20% lower than Eskom's pricing.

Shifts in the South African energy sector are also being driven by the increased adoption of hybrid and electric passenger vehicles. Sales figures for these vehicles, especially in the preowned market, have increased significantly in recent years. EV charging infrastructure, much of which uses renewable energy, is expanding. Furthermore, a 2026 SANRAL policy formalized public EV charging and battery swapping facilities in the same category as gas stations, and the SA Government's whitepaper position is that all new and upgraded forecourts should include EV chargers.

== Electricity production ==
=== The national grid ===
The South African energy grid has around 60,000 MW of capacity, most of which is operated by state-owned Eskom. However, in recent years, the share of non-Eskom power generation has grown significantly, especially under the 2025 Integrated Resource Plan.

=== Power generation split ===
As of 2025, South Africa's power generation by type of energy consists of 58% coal, 20% solar, 8% wind, 4.5% diesel, 4% hydro, 2.5% nuclear, and 4% other sources.

== Revenue collection ==
Electricity is paid for using various methods in South Africa, depending on where the user resides, and their payment preferences. For certain household users, payment goes directly to the municipality, such as is the case in most of the City of Cape Town, while for others, payment goes to Eskom, as the power supplier. Payments that go to the municipality are then paid by that local government to whomever the energy was sourced from, such as Eskom or an independent power producer (IPP), which would set their own pricing for bulk supply.

Electricity costs are determined by tariffs, with rates per kWh varying depending on the type of user (e.g., residential, commercial, and industrial); where the property is located; and the usage for the particular billing period (usually monthly). Municipalities set and publish these tariffs.

Certain properties have automatic billing, receiving an invoice at the end of the month. Over the years, municipalities have shifted towards prepaid electricity setups, where a prepaid meter is installed by the municipality in the user's premises. The user then purchases electricity in whatever quantity they prefer, whenever they want, and enters a token number into the meter to load the electricity. This can be purchased through a variety of methods, including many banking apps and general bill payment apps.

== History ==
Prior to the establishment of Eskom the provision of electricity was dominated by municipalities and private companies. The city of Kimberley was the first user of public electricity in South Africa when it installed electric streetlights run off a coal fired power plant in 1882 to reduce crime at night.

The first central power station and distribution system in South Africa consisting of a 150 kW generator with two boilers and located at Cape Town Harbour was completed in 1891 to supply power to government buildings in the nearby city.

In 1893 the town (now neighborhood) of Wynberg, in Cape Town, opened a power station to provide power to a local tram system and public street lights. This was followed by the first municipal power station built by the City of Cape Town in 1895 with the construction of the Graaff Electric Lighting Works to power 775 street lights.

Not all early power stations were successful, such as the short lived President Street Power Station in Johannesburg. Constructed in 1906, the use of unsuitable fuel in an experimental engine design lead to an explosion in 1907.

Between 1908 and 1912, four power stations were erected around Johannesburg to deliver electricity for the nearby mining industry. The power plants were connected to an electrical substation 8km outside of Rosherville by the first transmission lines in South Africa, with a voltage of 80 kV, 40 kV, and 20 kV.

Eskom was founded by the Electricity Act of 1922, which allowed for the establishment of a government owned non-profit company to provide electricity. In 1948 Eskom bought out the Victoria Falls and Transvaal Power Company with government support for £14.5 million (roughly equivalent to £2.55 billion in 2017) to become South Africa's primary electricity provider. Eskom dropped its non-profit mandate in the late 1970s and government control over the company was expanded in 1998 with the passing of the Eskom Amendment Act.

=== Renewables and energy producer diversification ===
==== Context ====
Following the South African government's announcing of the Integrated Resource Plan in 2010 and Renewable Energy Independent Power Producer Procurement Programme in 2011, numerous local companies have started trading platforms for wheeled renewable energy, including EXSA and Ampli Energy, with the aim of more stable pricing and supply, and increased market competition, within the country's energy sector.

As of 2025, South Africa has a total of 23 independent power producer–owned solar power facilities, each contributing more than 75MW of dispatchable power to the grid, with the largest providing 150MW. The country’s independent power producer (IPP) procurement programme aims to add 39GW of capacity to South Africa’s energy mix by 2030.

Plants already in operation have contributed significantly to preventing load-shedding. The Kenhardt hybrid solar and battery energy storage facility, with 540MW capacity, is the country’s largest, followed by Xina Solar One, Karoshoek Solar One, Kathu Solar Park, Kaxu Solar One, and Redstone Solar Thermal Power Plant. All of these plants are located in the Northern Cape province.

According to the Department of Energy's IPP Projects platform, South Africa's 25 largest solar farms contribute around 2,100MW to the national grid.

==== Solar energy potential ====
In early 2025, Senatla et al estimated that South Africa's commercial and industrial rooftops alone could generate around 12 gigawatts of solar energy. This includes retail outlets, universities, schools, hospitals, and factories. South Africa has approximately 111 million square meters of commercial and industrial rooftop surface (around 80% of the total) that is suitable for solar, and the country enjoys a very sunny climate, which is ideal for solar power generation.

The same researchers made numerous recommendations in terms of how best to use this potential energy resource. Firstly, they recommended that government regulations should be put in place to mandate the installation of solar power on all suitable new commercial rooftops. Secondly, they recommended that an assessment should be done of existing rooftops' potential to have solar installed.

And thirdly, they recommended that "virtual power plants" are set up, so that prosumers (those who consume and produce energy simultaneously) can sell power to the grid by forming virtual power plant platforms among themselves. The virtual power plant platform aggregates the power produced by these small power plants, and sells it at one price to Eskom, a municipality, or other prosumers. South Africa already has 5 such virtual power plants, but there exists an opportunity to develop a national policy to allow small scale producers to form virtual power plants and sell energy directly to their municipalities.

==== Progress ====
In May 2025, Sasol, South Africa’s second largest emitter of greenhouse gases, announced that it intended to run its flagship plant at full capacity, offsetting the use of coal feedstock by sourcing more renewables. Sasol aims to ramp up its Secunda synthetic fuels facility as close to a nameplate capacity of 7.6 million tons a year as possible, while maintaining its target of reducing emissions by 30% by 2030. This is part of a larger plan to decarbonise.

In June 2025, a World Bank-linked climate fund backed South African plans to cut the country's reliance on coal, unlocking up to R47 billion ($2.6 billion) in financing. The approval of an updated plan by the Climate Investment Funds will see the CIF disburse $500 million to the country. That, in turn, clears the path for as much as $2.1 billion in funding from multilateral lenders, including the World Bank and the African Development Bank. The funding is set to play an important role in South Africa’s energy transition.

In the same month, it was reported that German-based JUWI Renewable Energies was building large-scale solar projects for major companies in South Africa. The company signed two solar module supply agreements with JA Solar, and includes around 420,000 solar panels for two large-scale projects, with an energy output totaling 220 MW. These will be used for companies including Glencore, Sasol, and Air Liquide. The plants form part of JUWI's broader R6 billion rollout of new solar PV projects in South Africa.

In late June 2025, in his keynote address at the Africa Green Hydrogen Summit, South African President Cyril Ramaphosa reaffirmed his commitment to expanding the country's green hydrogen production. As of mid-2025, South Africa has invested more than R1.5 billion into its Hydrogen South Africa program.

Also in June 2025, it was announced that South African solar service provider Wetility had signed a R500 million deal with investment fund manager Jaltech, to fund the expansion of solar and battery systems across South Africa. The agreement will support the rollout of over 16 megawatts of distributed solar power, and avoid more than 25,000 metric tons of carbon emissions. The companies had worked together before, however this deal represents a significant expansion of their partnership.

In July 2025, it was reported that Eskom planned to decommission 23 gigawatts of electricity generated from five coal power stations by 2040. These stations would be replaced with alternatives such as hydro, gas, and nuclear power generation. The Just Energy Transition (JET) plans were announced before the South African Government's Portfolio Committee on Electricity and Energy.

As part of its JET, by 2040, Eskom plans to increase its hydro output from 3GW to 5GW, its other renewable energy type output from 3GW to 32GW, its gas output to 12GW, and its nuclear output to 10GW. Despite taking coal stations offline over this period, the power utility stated that its total electricity output would increase from 47GW in 2025 to 77GW in 2040.

In September 2025, the Carissa Wind Energy Facility (WEF), near Beaufort West, in the Western Cape, secured Environmental Authorisation (EA). With its capacity of 1,000 MW, it became the largest permitted wind farm in South Africa.

In October 2025, the European Union pledged to invest €11.5 billion (~ R231 billion) into South African clean energy, infrastructure, and pharmaceutical projects. A large portion of the investment aims to accelerate South Africa's shift to renewable energy, via new power generation capacity, grid upgrades, energy storage, and green hydrogen.

In May 2026, it was reported that Eskom Green had launched a R1.2 billion strategy to integrate renewable energy into its existing power generation network. Eskom aims to generate around 6 GW of new capacity by 2030, through a series of prioritized green projects. The first such project is the 75 MW solar facility at the Lethabo plant in the Free State.

=== Nuclear power developments ===
South Africa was once at the forefront of small modular nuclear reactor (SMR) development, with national electricity provider, Eskom, spending eleven years and R9 billion developing pebble-bed modular reactor technology (PBMR). However, no demonstration plant emerged from the process, and it was halted in 2010.

In recent years, there has been renewed interest from numerous private power producers to roll out SMRs across South Africa.

In July 2025, nuclear technology company Stratek Global announced that it had secured land on which it plans to build an SMR. The 2,000 hectare site is located along border of the Gauteng and North West provinces, and is owned by the Zilkaats Estate. Stratek stated that the site already had various kinds of infrastructure on it, and that, if it secured government approval, its HTMR-100 SMR would be able to produce 35MW of power, without requiring a large body of water for cooling. This would enable its deployment in many parts of South Africa.

In the same month, it was reported that US-based X-Energy, with the involvement of 2 former Eskom engineers, expressed interest in building SMR plants in South Africa. X-Energy’s Xe-100 PBMR supports up to 80MW of power production, and 4 such units can be combined, for a maximum output of 320MW.

=== Recent developments ===
In October 2025, South Africa's Minister of Electricity and Energy, Kgosientsho Ramokgopa, announced a major infrastructure development plan that, if implemented, will transform South Africa's energy sector, shifting the country away from a reliance on coal, and towards renewables and nuclear power.

The Integrated Resource Plan (IRP) is an updated version of the one the Government worked on in 2023. The new IRP is a blueprint for how SA will source its energy over the next decade, and has been passed by Parliament. A major amendment in the new version is a commitment to net zero by 2050, which means no new energy sourced will be from fossil fuels. Coal power generation is therefore set to decrease from 58% in 2025 to just 27% in 2039. Meanwhile, wind and solar power will increase from 8% and 10% in 2025, to 24% and 18% in 2039, respectively.

South Africa will also be renewing its Pebble Bed Modular Reactor (PMBR) project, which was shelved in 2010. Cabinet will be asked to reopen the PMBR facility at Pelindaba, the country's main nuclear research center, in Gauteng. Some of the PMBR technology used was developed in SA, and all PMBR technology will be transferred from Eskom to the South African Nuclear Energy Corporation (NECSA). Two areas marked for new nuclear power development are Duynefontein in the Western Cape (near SA's only existing nuclear plant), and Thyspunt, in the Eastern Cape.

Combined, these new IRP projects represent a significant shift for South Africa, which in 2025 was ranked as the world's 15th largest greenhouse gas emitter. IRP 2025 is set to introduce over 105,000 MW of new generation capacity by 2039, with investments totaling R2.2 trillion.

In February 2026, it was announced that South African renewable energy company SOLA Group had achieved financial close and commenced construction on its Naos-1 Hybrid Solar and Battery Project near Viljoenskroon in the Free State. The facility will comprise 435MWp of solar PV generation and a 855MWh battery energy storage system (BESS), with a peak output of 300MW. This will make it the largest private power plant by output in South Africa, as well as the largest capacity renewable energy plant in South Africa. Sasol and Air Liquide are set to be the plant's primary customers, and the facility is scheduled to be fully operational by the end of Q2 2028.

In July 2026, it was reported that South Africa would proceed with expanding its commercial nuclear power program - the only one of its kind in Africa. The expansion will procure 2,500 MW of new nuclear capacity to bolster energy security, reduce the country's dependency on coal plants, and help it meet its climate goals.

The process is expected to take learnings from a failed nuclear procurement process under former SA President Jacob Zuma. That process sought to obtain new plants directly from Russian firm Rosatom, and was declared unlawful by a South African High Court in 2017. This forced the government to restart its bidding process with more transparency and competitive rules.

The South African Government is therefore run a more strict procurement process to find a developer for the new power stations. This could attract bids from firms including France's EDF and Framatome, South Korea's Korea Hydro & Nuclear Power (KHNP), and the United States' Westinghouse. France supplied the technology used at SA's sole existing nuclear plant, Koeberg, and also facilitated the plant's extension program.

==== Unbundling ====
In 2019, it was announced that Eskom was to be restructured into three distinct state-owned entities, due to the company's debt and inability to supply power reliably. While the plan was initially intended to split power transmission off into its own independent entity, the Minister of Electricity and Energy Kgosientsho Ramokgopa later said the new transmission system operator (TSO) would report to Eskom. However, despite a preference by the Minister and Eskom itself to keep the TSO within Eskom's group of companies, President Cyril Ramaphosa announced during the February 2026 SONA that the new TSO would be entirely independent.

Ramaphosa took the autonomy to manage the transition process away from the Electricity Minister, and instead gave it to a newly-formed a National Energy Crisis Committee (NECOM) task team - the Eskom Restructuring Task Team (ERTT). The team was asked to submit a Phase I report on the feasibility of shifting the TSO assets out of Eskom. The ERTT reported that the project was feasible, aligned with international best practice, and could be done without compromising Eskom’s financial sustainability.

In July 2026, President Cyril Ramaphosa approved the Task Team's Phase I report, thus breaking Eskom's monopoly. He instructed the ERTT to spend three months producing a Phase II report, to lay out a timeline for shifting the transmission assets away from Eskom, through the ERTT, and then on to a fully independent, state-owned TSO. Ramaphosa said explicitly that no Eskom board members would be allowed to become members of the new board appointed to manage the transition.

==== Renewable expansion ====
In August 2026, the South African Minister of Electricity and Energy traveled to Beijing for the SA-China Energy Investment Conference. There, he announced a R2.2 trillion pipeline of renewable and transmission projects for investment. The Minister said that it made sense to do business with China with regards to energy, given that the country is the world's largest renewables producer, and part of BRICS+. As part of the projects, South Africa aims to add 105GW of renewable power generation capacity by 2039. The 2039 total therefore represents 190% more than the country's 2026 total capacity, across all generation types.

Later that same month, the Minister announced that six Chinese companies had committed to setting up factories to build transmission infrastructure parts in Gauteng. These would include facilities manufacturing pylons, transformers, and wire.

== See also ==
- Energy law
- List of power stations in South Africa
- Plug-in electric vehicles in South Africa
- South African National Energy Development Institute
