= Naos-1 =

Solar power station in South Africa

- Official name: Naos-1 Hybrid Solar and Battery Project
- Location: Waterford Farm, near Viljoenskroon, Free State, South Africa
- Coordinates: 26°57′59″S 26°54′13″E
- Status: Under development
- Construction began: TBC
- Commission date: Q1 2028
- Owner: SOLA Group
- Operator: SOLA Group

Solar farm
- Type: PV
- Site area: 590 hectares

Power generation
- Nameplate capacity: 300 MW
- Storage capacity: 855 MWh

External links
- Website: solagroup.co.za/utility-and-wheeling-projects/naos-solar-pv-project-one

The Naos-1 Hybrid Solar and Battery Project, commonly referred to simply as Naos-1, is a 300 MW photovoltaic solar power station being built in South Africa's Free State province. The plant will be developed by SOLA Group, a major South African independent power producer (IPP), in partnership with WBHO, and operated by SOLA Group.

On completion, Naos-1 is set to be the country's largest solar power station. It will also be SA's first utility-scale solar PV and battery energy storage project purpose-built for wheeling energy to private end-users.

Naos-1 will feature 855 MWh of battery storage, designed to provide low-cost, stable power during peak evening demand. Commissioning is expected in the first quarter of 2028.

The facility is part of SOLA's broader Naos solar project, which includes future Naos-2 and Naos-3 facilities. The plant has an operating period of up to 30 years from the date of commission, after which it has a 40-year and subsequent 30 year right of renewal period.

== Location ==
The power station is located on Portions 1 and 2 of Waterford Farm, No. 573, in the Free State province of South Africa. It forms part of the Moqhaka Local Municipality. The town of Viljoenskroon is 24 km south of the facility, and the town of Orkney is 12 km to its east.

The Waterford Farm will be rezoned from agricultural activity to zoning relevant to energy production.

== Features ==
The power station uses photovoltaic (PV) solar panels and has a battery energy storage system (BESS), using Lithium-ion or Vanadium Redox technology (to be confirmed), to provide off-peak power. Total capacity is 300 MW.

A power line will connect the facility from a collector substation to the national grid by linking into an existing 400 kV Mercury Main Transmission Substation (MTS).

== Background ==
A public participation process for Naos-1 was undertaken from 25 August through 27 September 2022. Various impact assessment studies were undertaken before approval for its construction, including those for potential terrestrial biodiversity, soil and agriculture, social, paleontological, wetland, and heritage impacts. Mitigation measures for relevant impacts were then developed.

In February 2026, it was reported that SOLA Group had reached financial close on the Naos-1 project, a solar PV and battery energy storage facility that will be purpose-built for wheeling power to private end-users.

The project forms part of SOLA's goal of reaching a capacity of 2GW of solar power and 5GWh of battery storage by 2030.

== Ownership ==
Naos-1 is 100% financed by SOLA Group, which will also operate the plant on completion.

== Energy production ==
25-year Power purchase agreements have been signed with South African petroleum company Sasol and French chemical company Air Liquide. Naos-1 forms part of Sasol's stated transition to a low-carbon energy portfolio.

== See also ==
- List of power stations in South Africa
