= Rubicon Group =

South African renewable energy company

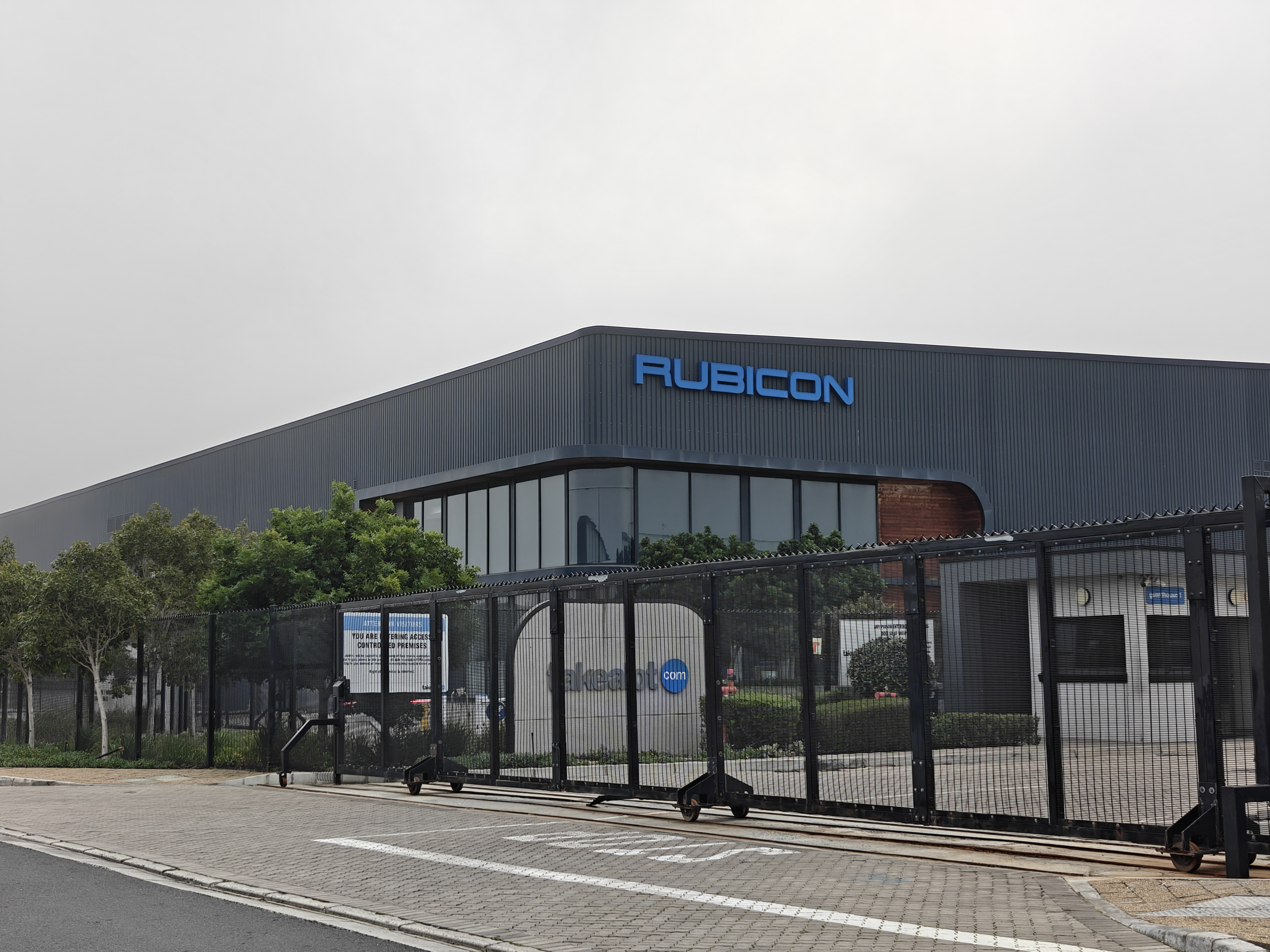
- Rubicon headquarters in Milnerton, Cape Town
- Type: Private
- Industry: Renewable energy
- Founded: 1986; 40 years ago
- Founder: John Schnetler
- Headquarters: Cape Town, South Africa
- Number of locations: 123 public EV chargers (2025)
- Area served: Africa; United Kingdom
- Key people: Richard Rushton (Chairman); Rick Basson (CEO)
- Products: Energy storage systems Solar panels Inverters; EV charging stations
- Subsidiaries: APEX
- Website: rubicon.tech

Rubicon Group, or simply Rubicon, is a South African renewable energy company, headquartered in Cape Town. Founded in 1986, the company manufactures renewable energy equipment, as well as resells such equipment from OEM companies. It is one of SA's largest distributors of third-party energy equipment.

Rubicon's own equipment is sold under its APEX subsidiary, while OEM equipment is resold (distributed in Rubicon's local market) for brands including Ecoflow, Autel, Delta, Goodwe, Solis, Vectis, Weco, Schneider, Seraphim, and Huawei.

The company operates a network of 123 public EV charging stations across South Africa, as of December 2025, making Rubicon the country's second-largest public charging operator. The company builds charging stations of its own, as well as ones for partnered automotive manufacturers. It is a participant of the Open Charge Point Interface, allowing for interoperability, through a roaming registry, between Rubicon chargers and those from competitor GridCars.

== History ==
Rubicon was founded as an electrical wholesaler in Gqeberha in 1986, by John Schnetler.

Over subsequent decades, various related business divisions have been established, and eventually merged to form the current Rubicon Group. Dylan Schnetler established Rubicon Energy, focusing on renewable energy solutions; Greg Blandford established Rubicon Automation, specializing in industrial automation; and Jürgen Chemelli established Province Lighting and Automation. Thereafter, Rick Basson led the strategy to combine the businesses into what became the modern Rubicon Group, which has since expanded into EV charging infrastructure and energy storage.

In 2022, following a decision to establish an electric mobility unit, Rubicon began building charging stations for OEMs, including Audi and BMW, and started building its own charging network later that year.

In October 2023, Rubicon announced that it aimed to expand its electric vehicle charging network from 90 chargers to over 250 by the end of 2024, through collaborations with the Automotive Industry Development Centre, Volvo, and Audi.

In February 2025, Rubicon launched a new public EV charging payment system. Through a partnership with Visa, EFT Corporation, and Verifone, the system is cloud-based and open loop. It enables Rubicon charger users to bypass creating accounts and loading funds onto dedicated payment platforms, by allowing them to pay using credit cards at chargers with integrated Verifone UX700 payment devices. The pilot for the system launched across a number of sites in Cape Town and Johannesburg.

In February 2026, Rubicon reported significant growth in its charging station capacity and transactions. Between 2023 and 2025, public charging capacity had increased by 103% to 6,684 kW. Energy dispensed through the network had increased by 281%, from 163,817kWh in 2023, to 625,000kWh in 2025. Furthermore, public EV charging transaction numbers increased by 401%, from 4,819 in 2023 to 21,606 in 2025. The company confirmed plans to reach 200 chargers by the end of 2027. At the time, Rubicon said its highest-earning chargers were those at Astron Energy's Milly’s Machadodrop N4 gas station, and Sasol's Thanda Tau N3 gas station.

== Operations ==
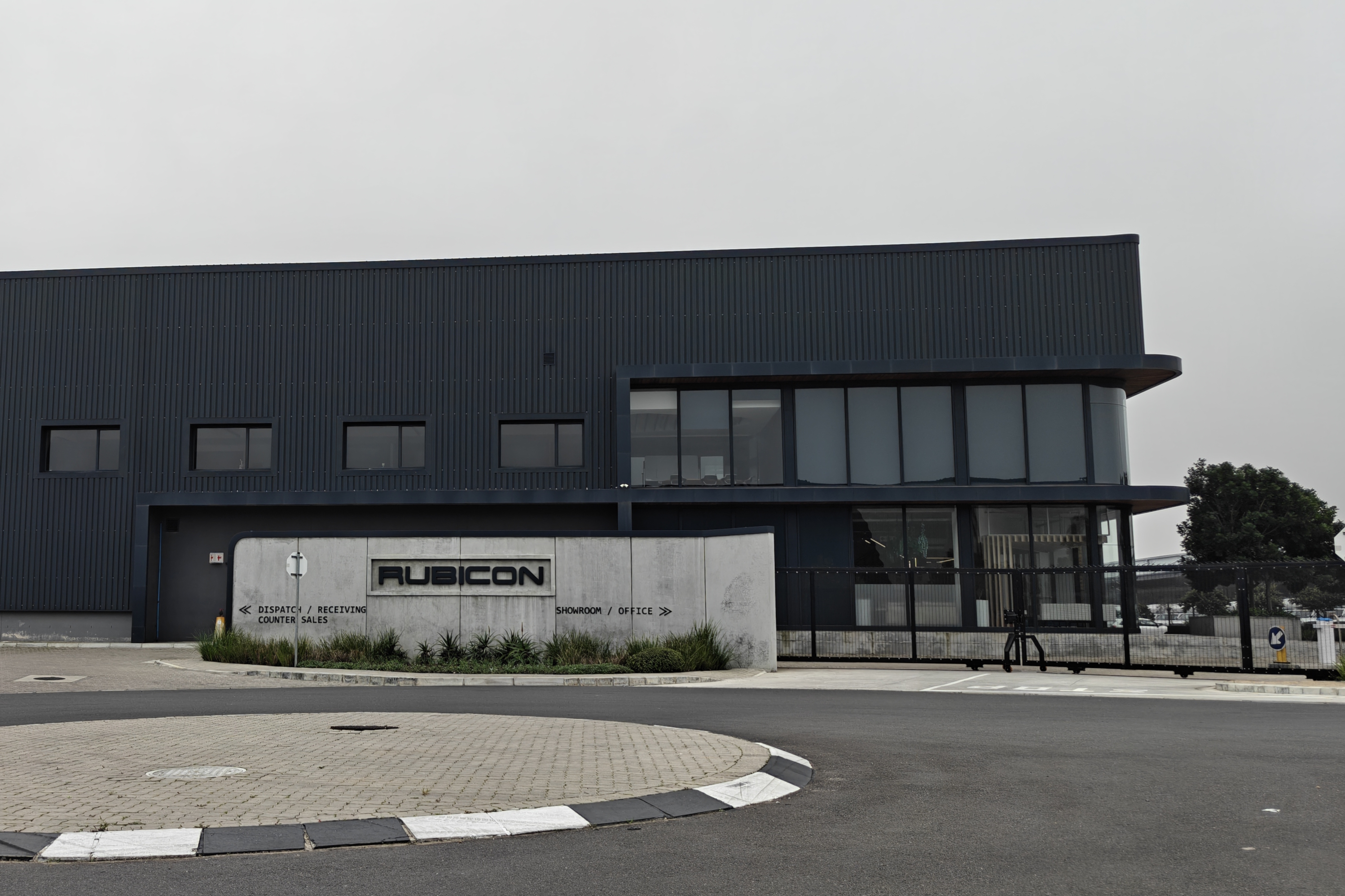
Rubicon showroom in Cape Town

As of mid-2026, Rubicon has the following business units:

- Distribution
  - Reselling of OEM energy products, including solar panels, solar inverters, battery storage systems, EV chargers, industrial automation equipment, and electrical balance-of-system components
- APEX
  - Subsidiary that develops and manufactures energy management systems and software, microgrid controllers, inverters, battery systems, and geyser controllers
- Vectis
  - In-house brand of commercial solar mounting systems
- Synapse
  - In-house brand of hybrid inverters, lithium batteries, and residential energy systems
- Rubicon Lighting
  - Custom light fittings, integrated lighting, smart lighting, and commercial lighting
- Energy services
  - Energy audits, power system analysis, solar system design, engineering support, equipment specification, project management, installation, commissioning, software integration, remote monitoring, technical support, maintenance, smart building design, and EV charging infrastructure design and deployment

Rubicon operates a public EV charging network in South Africa, with 123 outlets as of December 2025. The company also operates a Rubicon Charge app to find public chargers, and sells home charging systems. Furthermore, its app facilitates a charge card for NFC payments at participating EV chargers.

The company also has solar installation operations in the United Kingdom.

== See also ==
- Energy in South Africa
- Plug-in electric vehicles in South Africa
- Electricity sector in South Africa
