= SOLA Group =

South African solar energy infrastructure company

- Type: Private
- Industry: Renewable energy production Energy infrastructure Energy wheeling
- Founded: 2008; 18 years ago
- Headquarters: Cape Town, South Africa
- Number of locations: 100+ projects (2026)
- Area served: Southern Africa
- Key people: Dom Wills, Chris Haw, Simon Haw, and Dom Chennells (Executive Directors)
- Owner: AREP (40%)
- Website: solagroup.co.za

SOLA Group is a South African renewable energy infrastructure, generation, and storage company. Founded in 2008, the group is headquartered in Cape Town, South Africa.

The company provides energy to corporate clients through power purchase agreements (PPAs), both on-site and through wheeling. SOLA builds, owns, and operates private renewable wheeling projects across Southern Africa. As of 2026, the company has built over 100 such projects in 4 countries, and operates around 700 MW of private renewable energy production.

SOLA was the first independent power producer (IPP) in South Africa to be awarded a generation license for a private, utility-scale power plant outside of the public renewable energy procurement process, the first company to finance a utility-scale renewable wheeling project, and the first company to wheel green energy at scale across SA's national power grid.

== History ==
SOLA Group was founded in 2008 by brothers Simon and Chris Haw. The company was initially called Aurora Power Solutions (APS). APS began developing utility scale solar projects in 2010 and signed a Joint Development Agreement with Biotherm Energy that was later to result in successful bids into Round 1 of the Renewable Energy Independent Power Program. The Haw brothers were joined by Dom Chennells and Dom Wills as early employees and shareholders. APS later merged with a private customer focused subsidiary of APS, SOLA Future Energy, to form SOLA Group.

In late 2020, South African energy company African Rainbow Energy and Power (AREP), founded by businessman Patrice Motsepe, acquired a 40% shareholding in SOLA Group, becoming the company's largest single shareholder. The founding shareholders still retained control of the company at the time.

In November 2021, SOLA successfully brought about the first large-scale wheeling of renewable power in South Africa. It did so via the implementation of the 10MW Adams Solar PV Project, for Amazon. The facility, which is 45% owned by Mahlako Energy Fund, was constructed on 20 hectares of land in the Northern Cape to supply power to Amazon Web Services infrastructure. The project supported economic opportunities for local women and businesses.

In August 2024, SOLA commissioned South Africa's largest operational wheeling project. The 256 MW Selemela Solar Park was built in Lichtenburg, North West, on 430 hectares of land. It provides power to mineral sands miner Tronox. Energy will be transported to five of Tronox's sites – three in the Western Cape and two in KwaZulu-Natal. The project comprised the first large-scale renewable energy production facilities to be built outside the Northern Cape, which was typically considered to be the best location in South Africa for solar energy. However, since the province's grid capacity became constrained, SOLA built Selemela in the North West instead.

The Selemela project would cover approximately 40% of Tronox's total energy requirements, with the company planning on sourcing 100% of its energy needs from renewable sources over the long-term. SOLA Assets MD Katherine Persson noted the successes in the context of a new regulatory environment in South Africa; one more favorable to private power producers and renewable energy. A third solar project sizing 126MW was developed within the Selemela Cluster for African Rainbow Minerals.

In October 2025, SOLA announced that commercial operations had begun at its Springbok Solar Power Project in the Free State. At full capacity, the facility has the ability to generate around 430GWh of energy annually - enough to power 150,000 homes and offset 399,000 tons of carbon dioxide. The project's anchor purchaser is Amazon, and other buyers include Rio Tinto, Redefine, Old Mutual, Vodacom, BRM Brands, Sasol, and Afrimat.

Springbok was the fourth large-scale private wheeling operation that SOLA brought to commercial operation, bringing its total operational portfolio to 464MWp. It was Africa's first multi-buyer, flexible energy wheeling facility. SOLA said the project was an important step in modernizing South Africa's grid infrastructure while creating a model for future such development.

In February 2026, SOLA achieved Financial Close (FC) on its Naos-1 Hybrid Solar and Battery Project, a 300 MW (435 MWp) solar PV facility with 660 MWh of battery energy storage (BESS). Naos-1 was developed, designed, and implemented (intended to be operated) by SOLA, and its long-term power purchase agreement clients are Sasol and Air Liquide. The facility is the largest privately-contracted hybrid renewable energy project to reach Financial Close in South Africa to date. It is also the first utility-scale solar PV and battery energy storage project in SA that was purpose-built for wheeling to private end-users across the grid.

While traditional renewable projects often struggle to meet peak evening demand, Naos-1's hybrid design allows it to store low-cost solar energy and dispatch it when the grid needs it most, providing Air Liquide and Sasol with a reliable supply of clean energy at competitive tariffs. Naos-1's target commercial operation date is 2028.

== Operations ==
As of 2026, SOLA Group has built over 100 private renewable wheeling projects across all nine of South Africa's provinces, as well as Namibia, Seychelles, and Mozambique.

=== Major projects ===
Some of the main projects SOLA has installed and/or operated or plans to build are below. Their location and completion dates are in brackets.

==== Energy production facilities ====
- Aries (Northern Cape, 2011)
- Konkoonsies 1 (Northern Cape, 2014)
- Adams (Northern Cape, 2021)
- Selemela Solar Park (North West, 2023)
- Springbok (Free State, 2025)
- Naos-1 Solar PV Project (Free State, TBC)

==== Battery storage facilities ====
- Robben Island's 837 KWH storage (Cape Town, Western Cape, 2017)
- Cedar Mill shopping center's 696 KWH storage (Clanwilliam, Western Cape, 2018)
- Cousine Island's 1.1MWH storage (Seychelles, 2020)
- Pepsico's 2.9 MWH storage (Johannesburg, Gauteng, 2022)

=== Clients ===
The company's clients include the SA government as well as many of South Africa's largest corporates:

- REITs: Growthpoint Properties, Redefine Properties, Rabie, Noble Property
- Retail: Woolworths, Pick n Pay, Clicks, Mr Price Group
- Government: Department of Tourism, Eskom
- FMCG: Pepsico, Coca-Cola Beverages Africa
- Mining: African Rainbow Minerals
- Banking: Old Mutual
- Fuels: Sasol

== See also ==
- Electricity sector in South Africa
