= Etrion =

Etrion Corporation
- Type: Publicly traded
- Traded as: Nasdaq Stockholm: ETX, TSX: ETX
- Industry: Renewable Energy
- Founded: 2008
- Headquarters: Miami, Florida, United States
- Key people: Ashley Heppenstall (Chairman), Marco A. Northland (Chief Executive Officer and Director), Christian Lacueva (Chief Financial Officer), Ian H. Lundin (Director), Aksel Azrac (Director)
- Revenue: US $49.6 million (2014)
- Total assets: US $668.1 million (2014)
- Total equity: US $32.9 million (2014)
- Website: Etrion

Etrion Corporation is an independent power producer ("IPP") that develops, builds, owns and operates utility-scale solar power generation plants.

The Company owns 114 megawatts (MW) of installed solar capacity in Chile and Japan. Etrion has 57 MW of solar projects under construction in Japan and is also actively developing additional greenfield solar power projects in Japan. Etrion has been active in Japan since 2012.

Etrion is listed on the Toronto Stock Exchange in Canada and the NASDAQ OMX Stockholm exchange in Sweden under the ticker symbol "ETX". The Company is based in Miami, Florida, USA and has offices in Geneva, Switzerland and Tokyo, Japan.

Etrion's major shareholders are the Lundin family (24.3%) and other directors and management (6.7%).

Throughout 2021, the company sold its assets and then in September delisted from the Toronto Stock Exchange.
