= Ampli Energy =

South African energy company

- Industry: Renewable Energy
- Founded: May 2025; 1 year ago
- Headquarters: Sandton, South Africa
- Area served: South Africa
- Products: Renewable energy electronic trading platform
- Owner: Discovery; Sasol

Ampli Energy (stylized as ampli ENERGY) is a South African company providing a renewable energy trading platform that uses a wheeling process to deliver green energy to consumers.

The company was founded in 2025, as a joint venture between major South African financial services and private healthcare company Discovery's Discovery Green subsidiary, and major South African fuel company Sasol. It is headquartered in Sandton.

In a market-first, Ampli provides South African businesses of all sizes with power on a month-to-month basis, and pays companies cashback if they switch to renewable energy through Ampli's platform.

== History ==
Ampli Energy was founded on 15 May 2025, by Discovery and Sasol, launching at the Discovery headquarters in Sandton. At the time, Sasol had 75 years of experience in the South African energy sector, and Discovery had been operating in the financial services space for 33 years. Discovery already had an energy wheeling platform, offered through its Discovery Green subsidiary, which was founded in 2023.

As South Africa’s largest producer of renewable energy, Sasol ensured supply at launch for Ampli by leveraging its 69 MW Msenge Emoyeni wind farm in the Eastern Cape. Through a 20-year power purchase agreement, Sasol acts as the contracted off-taker, with the wind farm already delivering clean power into the national grid, and directly to Ampli Energy’s first clients.

Around the time of its launch, Ampli had clients including global fast-casual dining chain Nando’s, online florist NetFlorist, automotive company Hatfield Motor Group, luggage and apparel manufacturer Sealand Gear, certain Sasol gas stations, and numerous NGOs, such as Reach for a Dream and the Nelson Mandela Children's Hospital.

Ampli also had major clients through Discovery Green around the former's time of launch, including platinum miner Impala Platinum (Implats), hospitality group The Capital Hotels, lime mining company KP Lime, and real estate companies Balwin Properties and Fortress Real Estate Investments.

Head of Discovery Green, Andre Nepgen, confirmed that the 5-year Implats contract will supply 90% of the electricity needs for Impala Refineries in Springs, Gauteng, reducing the operation’s Scope 2 greenhouse gas emissions by more than 852,000 tons over the contract period, and delivering 130,000 MWh of electricity per year, at a tariff that is decoupled from Eskom’s rising prices. The first wheeled electricity for Implats is expected by the end of 2026.

The 10-year KP Lime contract will supply 90% of the energy needs of the company's Bowden mine, in the Northern Cape, supplying 54,000 MWh of green electricity per year.

Nepgen also stated that the other initial customers were confirmed to have long-term agreements of between 10 and 15 years.

Present at the launch event was Minister of Electricity and Energy Kgosientsho Ramokgopa, who emphasized the importance of readily available and affordable green electricity for a country's growth, and said that South Africa needs to ensure energy security and energy access.

== Expansion ==
On 30 May 2025, it was announced that Discovery Green had signed a power purchase agreement with power producer Red Rocket that unlocks the second phase of the independent power producer’s (IPP) 150 MW Overberg Wind Farm, located 12 km west of Swellendam, in the Western Cape. The Overberg Wind Farm's Phase 2 project will deliver over 489 GWh annually, which will be wheeled to Ampli Energy clients.

The project is expected to begin full commercial operations in 2027, and Discovery Green's CEO stated that the investment set a strong precedent for enabling a renewable energy model which meets the needs of a diverse range of businesses.

== Operations ==
Ampli Energy provides a renewable energy electronic trading platform, through which companies in South Africa can purchase green energy from independent power producers. The businesses can do so as per their individual requirements. IPPs on the platform include those generating energy from wind and solar sources.

The company charges no fees for its service, and focuses on small energy consumers, including mid-sized corporates, SMMEs, and NGOs.

The company's goal is to enable businesses to meet their financial and decarbonization goals in a single, straightforward transaction. Further, the company aims to enable consumers to avoid seasonal volatility in power generation and consumption, as well as reduce energy waste.

Ampli uses a process called wheeling to provide energy to its customers. Wheeling is he transmission of power from one system to another through a third-party interconnecting network. Ampli, as the wheeling provider (utility), receives compensation for the service and any electricity losses incurred during transmission. As an economic concept, wheeling combines the characteristics of opposing designs of the electricity market; as a regulated public utility, and as a competitive market.

The platform uses what Apmpli refers to as a Technology Layer (for operational capability, monitoring, and flexibility), a Technical Layer (for market experience in spheres such as legal, lending, and engineering), and an Actuarial Layer (to model and match energy generation and consumption with the goal of maximizing savings and the use of renewables).

The business offers two products through its trading platform:

- Green Guarantee, for businesses wanting to reduce carbon emissions by using 100% renewable energy, and
- Green Saver, for companies using some renewable generation, and wanting to maximize savings through optimization.

Rather than a single renewable energy generator supplying a single business, the Ampli platform brings together a wide variety of businesses and their consumption profiles and connects them with local and international renewable energy providers. The platform uses traditional insurance principles like risk pooling and diversification to supply up to 100% of consumers' energy needs with renewable energy. By reallocating excess energy across the platform, Ampli also mitigates situations where businesses pay for wasted energy costs, as they would for unused power sourced through traditional methods (such as straight from a national grid provider like South Africa's Eskom).

== Capacity ==
At launch in May 2025, Ampli Energy had over 450MWh per annum of renewable energy generation capacity, an investment by Sasol and Discovery Green that was estimated to be worth between R1.8 billion and R2.5 billion.

== Ownership ==
Ampli Energy is co-owned by two major South African corporations; financial services provider Discovery and fuel giant Sasol.

== See also ==
- Renewable energy in South Africa
- Energy in South Africa
- Climate change in South Africa
- Integrated Resource Plan
- Renewable Energy Independent Power Producer Procurement Programme
- Feed-in tariff
- List of power stations in South Africa
