= Xina Solar One Power Station =

Solar farm in South Arica

- Country: South Africa
- Location: Pofadder, Khâi-Ma Municipality, Namakwa District, Northern Cape Province
- Coordinates: 28°53′21″S 19°35′23″E
- Status: Operational
- Construction began: 2014
- Commission date: 2017
- Construction cost: US$880 million
- Owner: XiNa Solar One Pty Limited
- Operator: Engie

Solar farm
- Type: CSP
- CSP technology: Parabolic trough
- Site area: 850,000 square metres (210 acres)

Power generation
- Nameplate capacity: 100 MW (130,000 hp)
- Annual net output: 380 GWh

The Xina Solar One Power Station is a 100 MW (130,000 hp) concentrated solar power plant in South Africa. Constructed between 2014 and 2016, the power station was commercially commissioned in 2017. The solar component of this power station is complemented by molten salt thermal storage technology, which allows the power station to provide full power for another 5.5 hours, after the sun goes down, thus supplying energy during South African peak hours. The consortium that owns the solar farm comprises a foreign independent power producer (IPP), two domestic finance development companies and a local charity. The energy generated here is sold directly to Eskom, the South African national electricity utility company, under a 20-year power purchase agreement (PPA).

== Location ==
The power station is located near Pofadder, a small town in Khâi-Ma Municipality, in Namakwa District, in the Northern Cape Province of South Africa, close to the international border with Namibia. Pofadder is located approximately 173 kilometres (107 mi) by road north-east of Springbok, the district capital of Namakwa District. This is about 627 kilometres (390 mi) by road, west of the city of Kimberley, the capital of Northern Cape Province. The geographical coordinates of Xina Solar One Power Station are:28°53'21.0"S, 19°35'23.0"E (Latitude:-28.889167; Longitude:19.589722).

== Overview ==
The power station has a 100 megawatt solar power capacity. Using parabolic mirrors, the station concentrates sunlight to produce heat. That heat is used to melt salts to store energy. When the sun sets, the solar component is extinguished. The molten salts are then processed through a heat exchanger to release heat and generate electricity, after sunset. Even when the sun is up, the solar energy is converted into heat by the parabolic mirrors. That heat is then used to heat water to produce steam. It is the steam that drives the electricity generators, when the sun is up or down.

The water used to run this power station is sourced from the Orange River. In order to produce 1 MWh of electricity, the power station uses 0.15 cubic meters (150 L) of water. The generated energy is transmitted via 220kiloVolt cables a distance of approximately 3 kilometres (2 mi) to an Eskom substation in the neighborhood called Paulputs, where the energy enters the national grid.

== Developers ==
The owners of the power station established a special purpose vehicle company (SPV) called XiNa Solar One Pty Limited to own, design, finance, develop, operate and maintain this power station. The ownership in the SPV at the time of commissioning is as illustrated in the table below.

Shareholding In XiNa Solar One Pty Limited In 2017
| Rank | Shareholder | Domicile | Percentage | Notes |
|---|---|---|---|---|
| 1 | Abengoa Solar | Spain | 40.0 | |
| 2 | Industrial Development Corporation | South Africa | 20.0 | |
| 3 | Public Investment Corporation | South Africa | 20.0 | |
| 4 | KaXu Community Trust | South Africa | 20.0 | |
| | Total | | 100.0 | |

In 2021 Abengoa Solar concluded the sale of its 40 percent shareholding in the Xina Solar One Power Station and concurrent 46 percent ownership in the Xina Operations & Maintenance Company (Pty) Limited. The buyer was Engie, the French multinational utility company.

== Construction costs and commissioning ==
The power station cost US$880 million to construct. Ground breaking occurred in 2014 and commercial commissioning took place in 2017.

== See also ==
- Solar power in South Africa
- List of power stations in South Africa
- Karoshoek Solar Power Station
