= List of largest mining companies by revenue =

This is a list of the largest mining companies in terms of revenue (in US billion dollars) as ranked by Investopedia in 2023.

No.	Company	Revenue (billion US dollars)	Headquarters
1	Glencore	255.98	Switzerland
2	Jiangxi Copper	70.99	China
3	BHP	60.28	Australia
4	Rio Tinto	50.55	Australia|United Kingdom
5	Aluminum Corporation of China Limited	42.46	China
6	Vale	41.46	Brazil
7	Zijin Mining	40.96	China
8	Anglo American plc	35.12	United Kingdom
9	Hindalco Industries	27.83	India
10	CMOC Group Limited	25.25	China

== See also ==
- Largest gold companies
- List of largest coal mining companies
- List of largest manufacturing companies by revenue
- List of public corporations by market capitalization
- List of largest chemical producers
