= Karoshoek Solar Power Station =

Solar farm in South Africa

Karoshoek Solar One Power Station
- Country: South Africa
- Location: Upington, Dawid Kruiper Municipality, ZF Mgcawu District, Northern Cape Province
- Coordinates: 28°28′50″S 21°32′45″E
- Status: Operational
- Construction began: 2015
- Commission date: November 2018
- Construction cost: US$180 million
- Owner: Karoshoek Solar One Pty Limited
- Operator: Karoshoek Solar One

Solar farm
- Type: Flat-panel PV
- Site area: 400 hectares (1.5 sq mi)

Power generation
- Units operational: 360,000
- Nameplate capacity: 100 MW (130,000 hp)
- Annual net output: 380 GWh

The Karoshoek Solar One Power Station, also Karoshoek Concentrated Solar Power Station, is a 100 megawatts concentrated solar power plant in South Africa. The solar component of this power station comprises curved mirrors that heat a fluid to a high temperature. The hot fluid is used to heat water, creating steam. The steam then "drives a steam turbine to convert the energy into electricity". That part of the power station is complemented by molten salt thermal storage technology, which "allows five hours of energy storage, enabling the plant to continue producing electricity in the absence of sunlight", supplying energy during South African peak hours. The consortium that owns the solar farm comprises foreign and domestic independent power producers (IPPs) and local and international financiers and other investors. A 20-year power purchase agreement (PPA), between the owners and Eskom, the South African electric utility company, governs the sale of the generated energy to Eskom, the off-taker. The power station achieved commercial commissioning in November 2018.

== Location ==
The power station is located about 30 kilometres (19 mi), east of Upington, a small town in Dawid Kruiper Municipality, ZF Mgcawu District, in the Northern Cape Province. Upington is located approximately 409 kilometres (254 mi) by road, west of the city of Kimberley, the capital of Northern Cape Province. The geographical coordinates of Karoshoek Solar One Power Station are: 28°28'50.0"S, 21°32'45.0"E (Latitude:-28.480556; Longitude:21.545833).

== Overview ==
Using 360,000 parabolic mirrors, arranged precisely to track the sun's movement using GPS technology, the station concentrates sunlight to produce heat. That heat is then used to heat water to produce steam. It is the steam that drives the electricity generators to generate electricity. Some of the heat is simultaneously used to melt salts to store energy. When the sun sets, the solar component is extinguished. The molten salts are then processed through a heat exchanger to release heat and generate electricity, after sunset. The molten salts store heat that allows the power station to generate power up to five hours after the sun sets. Karoshoek Concentrated Solar Power Station was developed between 2015 and 2018 as part of te South African Government's Renewable Energy Independent Power Producer Procurement Programme (REIPPPP).

== Developers ==
The owners of the power station established a special purpose vehicle company (SPV). For descriptive purposes, we will call the SPV Karoshoek Solar One Consortium Limited. The SPV was tasked to own, design, finance, develop, operate and maintain this power station for the duration of the PPA. The ownership in the SPV at the time of commissioning is as illustrated in the table below.

Shareholding In Karoshoek Solar One Consortium Limited
Rank	Shareholder	Domicile	Percentage	Notes
1	Industrial Development Corporation	South Africa	20.0	
2	Cobra Group	Spain	20.0	
3	Public Investment Corporation	South Africa	20.0	
4	Emvelo Holdings	South Africa	15.0	
5	Karoshoek Community Trust	South Africa	15.0	
6	Hosken Consolidated Investment	South Africa	10.0	
	Total		100.0	

== Construction costs and commissioning ==
The power station cost US$180 million to construct. The engineering, procurement and construction (EPC) contract was awarded to a joint venture company called Dankocom, comprising Cobra, Emvelo and Sener, an engineering and technology group based in Spain. Ground breaking occurred sometime in 2015 and commercial commissioning took place on 30 November 2018.

== See also ==
- List of power stations in South Africa
- Xina Solar One Power Station
