= Jenny Nijenhuis =

South African visual artist

- Born: Johannesburg, South Africa
- Known for: Public installations, Sculpture
- Notable work: SA's Dirty Laundry public installation
- Awards: Sasol New Signatures art competition 2017, Finalist, PPC Imaginarium art award in 2015, Finalist, Lovell Tranyr Art Trophy 2014, Finalist
- Website: www.jennynijenhuis.com

Jenny Nijenhuis (born 1969) is a contemporary South African sculptor and visual artist known for her sculptures and public installations.

== Life and career ==
Jenny Nijenhuis was born in Johannesburg, South Africa and in 1993 received her Bachelor of Fine Arts from the University of the Witwatersrand. In 2014 she was selected as finalist for the Lovell Tranyr Art Trophy. She was selected as finalist for the PPC Imaginarium art award in 2015, and finalist for the Sasol New Signatures art competition in 2017. Between 2005 - 2018 she ran Geneaology Brand DNA, an integrated communications design agency. Her works can be found in private and public art collections such as the August House in Johannesburg, and the Paul Stuart private collection. Nijenhuis was invited by the Cornell University International Students Union (ISU) to give the keynote address at a university-wide event being hosted on 7 March 2019. She has been asked to introduce the work she is doing as an advocate for women's rights.

== Public installations ==
In 2016 Nijenhuis devised SA's Dirty Laundry public installation together with performance artist Nondumiso Msimanga. The installation consisted of 1,200 meters of washing lines displaying 3,600 pairs of underwear, which according to the Medical Research Council, matches the number of rapes estimated to occur on a daily basis in South Africa. The panties were hung in the streets of Johannesburg for two weeks to denounce sexual abuse and rape. In an interview with BBC News Africa Nijenhuis explained that she used underwear because it is the most intimate garment people wear, and it is also the last garment removed during a rape. From her point of view the use of this intimate garment carries a much stronger, and personal message symbolically.

SA's Dirty Laundry has received major international coverage. The installation has been featured by The Guardian, Marie Claire, Upworthy, as well as on Italian, Spanish, German, Turkish and Chinese media, among others. It has also been the subject of scholarly attention. Dineke Orton's 2023 article in Image & Text examines the installation as an artivist intervention and discusses its use of donated underwear, public washing lines and the disputed 3,600 statistic.

Nijenhuis and Msimanga have been criticized for using the Medical Research Council statistic, as the United Nations estimates that 132 rapes are committed in South Africa each day. The artists responded by pointing out that all attempts to quantify sexual assault in South Africa are flawed, and that the majority of incidents are not reported by victims.

In November 2019 Nijenhuis presented This is South Africa, a large South African flag made out of panties and underwear that were donated by rape survivors to her SA's Dirty Laundry installation in 2016. The flag is hung upside down as a signal of distress in accordance with the international communication protocols. The flag was hung at the SA High Commission in London to coincide with a protest against gender violence.

== Sculptures ==
Nijenhuis's sculpture explores identity archetypes and human positioning in the world through the use of the human body. This exploration draws on identity development and how this identity is influenced by life in society. Certain concepts behind her sculpture works are influenced by psychoanalyst Carl Jung.

Nijenhuis models directly in clay to produce life size figures to achieve real world presence through their human scale and other smaller works using trace elements to explore presence through installation. Nijenhuis's work addresses issues of isolation, vulnerability, manipulation, gender and the female experience.

== Selected exhibitions ==
- 2022 - Resonance, Women's Prison Atrium, Constitution Hill, Johannesburg
- 2022 - Playing by the Rules, Lizamore & Associates at The Firestation, Johannesburg
- 2019 - This is South Africa, Guns & Rain, Johannesburg; South African High Commission, London
- 2019 - Stories of Empowerment: Women's Voices Around the World, Cornell University, Ithaca, New York
- 2016 - SA's Dirty Laundry, SoMa Art + Space, Maboneng, Johannesburg
