= GridCars =

South African EV charging operator

- Type: Private
- Industry: Electric vehicle charging
- Founded: 2009; 17 years ago
- Headquarters: Roodepoort (City of Johannesburg Metropolitan Municipality), Gauteng, South Africa
- Number of locations: 350+ (2025)
- Area served: South Africa
- Key people: Winstone Jordaan (CEO)
- Services: Public EV charging infrastructure
- Website: gridcars.net

GridCars is a South African electric vehicle charging network operator, and the largest of its kind in SA by number of charging stations.

Founded in 2009, the company was the first to enter the local EV charging market. GridCars is headquartered in Roodepoort, and operates over 350 EV charging stations across South Africa, as well as a cashless EV charging payments app called Charge Pocket.

GridCars is a participant of the Open Charge Point Interface, allowing for interoperability, through a roaming registry, between its own chargers and those from competitor Rubicon.

== History ==
GridCars was established in 2009, when it installed its first electric vehicle charger in the Council for Scientific and Industrial Research (CSIR) building in Pretoria.

In 2017, holding company Alviva announced that one of its subsidiaries, Solareff, had acquired a 75% shareholding in GridCars.

GridCars partnered with Jaguar at the end of 2018, to roll out 82 public charging stations across SA.

In May 2020, GridCars was one of the founding members of the Electric Vehicle Industry Association (EVIA), along with BMW SA, Nissan SA, SANEDI, and uYilo.

In September of the same year, BMW announced a three-year deal with GridCars, where the latter would be its official EV charging operator. At the time, GridCars had around 150 chargers in its network, and the deal coincided with BMW's release of the electric Mini Cooper SE, which was at the time South Africa's most affordable EV.

In July 2022, GridCars became the first EV charging network operator on the African continent to integrate its charging network into Google Maps.

GridCars' CEO confirmed that the company had reached a network total of 300 chargers in September 2022.

In 2024, GridCars partnered with South African energy production company and then-sole public utility Eskom to roll out 60 kW DC fast chargers and 22 kW AC chargers for the latter. The new chargers would cater for overnight charging of Eskom fleet vehicles, as well as daytime charging for employees and visitors. The installation served as the blueprint for Eskom's transition to using more EVs, as well as formed part of its goal of net zero carbon emissions by 2050.

In October 2025, South African renewable energy company Solareff announced its divestiture from GridCars. Solareff, which had been a majority owner-operator of GridCars, stated that the reason was so that it could focus on energy innovation, as GridCars had moved into the growth phase.

In December 2025, GridCars announced its intention to bring ultra-fast, liquid-cooled EV chargers to the South African market.

== Operations ==
GridCars operates over 350 AC and DC fast charging connectors across South Africa, many of which are located in the more populated provinces of the Western Cape, KwaZulu-Natal, and Gauteng. The company's chargers, which are located on highways and in urban areas, account for around 60% of SA's total public charging points.

The company does site planning, charger installation, maintenance, and back-end management for its network. It also works with automotive OEMs to ensure charging integration with EVs.

Customers can access GridCar chargers by various methods, including RFID cards, remote start in an app, scanning a QR code, or using an auto-charge feature if they register for it.

Through its ChargePocket service, GridCars allows EV drivers to process cashless payments for EV charging across numerous providers. As of 2025, the service is partnered with Jaguar Electrifies, as well as GridCars' own ActiveCharge EV charging station locator service.

The company has partnerships with, among others:

- Jaguar
- BMW
- Volvo
- Audi

== See also ==
- Automotive industry in South Africa
- Electricity sector in South Africa
