= Coal gasification commercialization =

Coal gasification is a process whereby a hydrocarbon feedstock (coal) is converted into gaseous components by applying heat under pressure in the presence of steam. Rather than burning, most of the carbon-containing feedstock is broken apart by chemical reactions that produce "syngas." Syngas is primarily hydrogen and carbon monoxide, but the exact composition can vary. In Integrated Gasification Combined Cycle (IGCC) systems, the syngas is cleaned and burned as fuel in a combustion turbine which then drives an electric generator. Exhaust heat from the combustion turbine is recovered and used to create steam for a steam turbine-generator. The use of these two types of turbines in combination is one reason why gasification-based power systems can achieve high power generation efficiencies. Currently, commercially available gasification-based systems can operate at around 40% efficiencies. Syngas, however, emits more greenhouse gases than natural gas, and almost twice as much carbon as a coal plant. Coal gasification is also water-intensive.

According to the Gasification and Syngas Technologies Council, a trade association, there are globally 272 operating gasification plants with 686 gasifiers and 74 plants with 238 gasifiers under construction. Most of them use coal as feedstock.

As of 2017 large scale expansion of the coal gasification industry was occurring only in China where local governments and energy companies promote the industry for the sake of jobs and a market for coal. The central government is aware of the conflict with environmental goals. For the most part the plants are located in remote coal rich areas. In addition to producing a great deal of carbon dioxide the plants use a great deal of water in areas where water is scarce.

== Wabash River IGCC ==
Bituminous coal gasification to produce electricity

The Wabash River Coal Gasification Repowering Project was a demonstration of advanced integrated gasification combined cycle (IGCC) technology, a joint venture between the Wabash River Coal Gasification Project Joint Venture and the U.S. Department of Energy. The term “repowering” refers to the IGCC plant's replacing a dated conventional pulverized coal power plant. Construction began in July 1993 near West Terre Haute, Indiana, followed by operational startup in November 1995. The project demonstration phase was completed and turned over for commercial operation in December 1999.

The gasification technology utilized at Wabash River IGCC was developed originally by Dow Chemical, and was subsequently transferred to Destec, a partially held subsidiary of Dow Chemical. The technology was later acquired by ConocoPhillips. CB&I currently licenses this process technology under the name E-GAS™.

The Wabash River IGCC Power Plant is designed to use a variety of local coals, including high-sulfur Midwestern bituminous coals such as Illinois No. 6. In addition, petroleum coke and blends of coal and coke are consumed, in the range of about 2,500 TPD to generate about 262 MWe net output of electricity.

Plant design was conducted with the goal of outperforming the Clean Air Act (CAA) emission standards, which limit sulfur dioxide (SO_{2}) at 1.2 lb/million Btu of fuel input and NO_{x} at 0.15 lb/million Btu. Demonstrated emissions are far better than these targets. Despite power generation at the Wabash River complex being almost three times that of the original unit, the total emissions are a fraction of the pre-powering values as a result of the IGCC system. Particulate emissions are negligible.

== Tampa Electric IGCC ==
Bituminous coal gasification to produce electricity

Construction began on this IGCC unit at Tampa Electric Company's Polk Power Station (Polk County, Florida) in October 1994, followed by operational startup in September 1996. The project ran for four years as a demonstration, and continues to operate as a power production facility for Tampa Electric. The plant uses GE Energy's (formerly owned by Texaco), entrained-flow, oxygen-blown gasifier to produce syngas from coal or petroleum coke which feeds a combined-cycle turbine system to produce electricity. The IGCC unit consumes 2,200 TPD of bituminous coal, producing 260 MW of electricity.

The following table quantifies the emissions from the Polk Power Station, with comparison to emissions associated with conventional technologies for electricity generation from coal. Typical of electricity generation based on coal gasification with combined cycle generation, emissions of pollutants are far lower than those of conventional technologies. For example, notwithstanding the IGCC unit is fueled by high-sulfur coal and/or petroleum coke, sulfur emissions are very low as a benefit of the MDEA amine gas treating system that removes H_{2}S from the syngas fueling the combustion turbine.

Pollutant (lbs/MWhour)	Pulverized coal-based	Atmospheric Fluidized Bed Combustor-based	Polk (Permit)	Polk (Steady-state)
SO_{2}	2.2	3.3	1.4	1.0
NO_{x}	3.6	1.8	0.9	0.7
Particulate	0.8	0.2	0.07	<0.01

== Duke Energy Edwardsport IGCC Project ==
Bituminous coal gasification to produce electricity

Duke Energy began construction on an IGCC plant in Edwardsport, Indiana in 2008, which began commercial operations in June 2013. The IGCC-based unit at Edwardsport will consume 1.7-1.9 million tons of coal per year to generate 618 MW of base-load electricity. It uses GE gasification technology, GE 7FB combustion turbines, and a GE steam turbine. The IGCC plant replaces a now demolished 160 MW coal-fired power plant at the site, and while it can produce nearly four times the power of the unit it replaced, it has far lower emissions of SO_{2}, NO_{x}, and particulates. There is potential for carbon capture and geologic sequestration in the context of the Edwardsport IGCC project, with space reserved at the site for CO_{2} capture equipment. Also, Duke initiated a front-end engineering and design study for carbon capture and filed a $121 million request with Indiana Utility Regulatory Commission for detailed characterization of deep saline aquifers, depleted oil or gas fields, and enhanced oil recovery. Schlumberger Carbon Services is to begin site assessment for deep saline sequestration near the plant.

== Eastman Chemical Company Kingsport Plant ==
Coal gasification to produce chemicals

One of the earliest and most notable coal gasification-based chemical plants in the United States is owned and operated by Eastman Chemical Company and based in Kingsport, Tennessee. Known as the Eastman Integrated Coal Gasification facility, it first opened in 1983 and is designed to process syngas from the gasification of Southwest Virginia and Eastern Kentucky coal, using Texaco gasifiers (now GE gasifier technology). The intermediate products of syngas conversion are methanol and CO; these are further converted into products consisting of 500 million pounds per year of acetyl chemicals including acetic anhydride and acetic acid, enough to supply half of Eastman's raw acetyl needs. Acetyl chemicals are important to many of Eastman's products, but especially those at the Kingsport site, where five of seven manufacturing divisions rely on acetyls as a raw material. The success of the operation led to a decision to expand the plant capacity to an excess of 1 billion pounds per year to meet all of Eastman's needs.

The process configuration at Eastman is fairly complex, as a consequence of the feedstock requirements associated with multiple chemical syntheses involved. Part of the syngas resulting from the gasification of feed coal is shifted, and a Rectisol process is utilized for sulfur removal and CO_{2} removal. Recovered CO_{2} is sold for use in making carbonated beverages.

== Great Plains Synfuels Plant ==
Lignite gasification to produce synthetic natural gas or ammonia

The Great Plains Synfuels Plant (GPSP) in Beulah, North Dakota has been in operation since 1984 producing synthetic natural gas (SNG) from lignite coal, and remains the only coal-to-SNG facility in the United States. GSPS is operated by the Dakota Gasification Company. In addition to the production of SNG, the plant also produces high purity carbon dioxide, which is distributed through a pipeline to end users in Saskatchewan, Canada (Apache Canada at the Midale field and Cenovus Energy at the Weyburn field, until that asset was sold to Whitecap Resources in 2017) for enhanced oil recovery operations.

Operational profitability of the GPSP is affected by the market price of natural gas, with which SNG competes. In response, an anhydrous ammonia synthesis unit was added to the process train at the plant in the 1990s, diversifying the plant's product line away from synthetic fuels (SNG), with a substantial capacity to produce anhydrous ammonia, a feedstock for fertilizer production. The plant can shift production to higher value products, depending on fluctuating market conditions.

== Kemper County Energy Facility ==
Lignite coal gasification to produce electricity

Southern Company Services/Mississippi Power started construction on a new IGCC plant located in Kemper County, Mississippi in December 2010. Construction for the Kemper project is 75% complete as of January 2013. Start of commercial operations for the plant is scheduled for 2016, in which the plant will convert 12,000 tons of local Mississippi low-rank coal per day (large reserves of 4 billion tons of mineable lignite are located near the plant) to produce 582 MW (net) of electricity. The new plant will utilize KBR's TRIG™ gasifier technology, suitable for utilization of the local lignite resources; two of the gasifiers will operate in air-blown mode at the Kemper County plant.

TRIG™ and related systems for gasification of low-rank coal had been developed by KBR and Southern Company in conjunction with DOE at the Power Systems Development Facility (PSDF) in Wilsonville, Alabama, which comprised an engineering-scale demonstration of TRIG™ and associated critical subsystems. This provided the engineering and operational basis for the full-scale plant now being constructed in Kemper County.

The plant will capture and sequester 65% of the CO_{2} it produces through enhanced oil recovery. Emissions controls will remove over 99% SO_{2} and P25, at least 90% Hg, and limit NO_{x} emissions to less than 0.07 lb/million Btu.

The Kemper County IGCC project is estimated to cost $4.7 billion, but the Kemper plant will be the cheapest plant to operate once it's up and running. Mississippi Power has received a $270 million grant from the Department of Energy and $412 million in investment tax credits approved by the IRS through the National Energy Policy Act of 2005 and the Energy Improvement and Extension Act of 2008.

The Gasifier component of this project has been canceled.

== Sasol ==
Sasol, in South Africa, operates commercial gasification plants in Secunda, Mpumalanga and in Sasolburg.

== Proposed Coal Gasification ==
During the 2011 session of the Illinois legislature proposals to provide financial support for state-of-the-art coal gasification plants in Chicago and Southern Illinois were considered. The bills require Illinois utilities to purchase gas at fixed rates from the plants for 30 years. The Chicago plant to be built by Chicago Clean Energy, a subsidiary of Leucadia National Corporation, is budgeted to cost $3 billion. It would be located in an existing industrial area on the Southeast Side on Burley Avenue near 116th Street. In addition to coal the plant would use coke, an oil refinery byproduct, as feed stock. Carbon dioxide produced during the project would be sequestered. The bill to build the Chicago plant was passed by the legislature but vetoed by the Illinois governor Pat Quinn who cited cost issues. Due to uncertainty about natural gas supplies and prices alternative financing is doubtful. Another plant, Indiana Gasification, LLC also a Leucadia National Corporation subsidiary and with a similar business plan, is proposed for Rockport, Indiana where the state has agreed to purchase gas for 30 years at a fixed price.

During sometime in late 2011 to early 2012, around 18 coal exploitation licenses were given by the coal association to create new coal gasification plants around the island of Great Britain, with the largest being in Swansea Bay, where up to 1bn tonnes of coal sits underneath the water. If these licenses pass, The UK could be a major coal power in the world once more.

Since 2012 Ukraine is gradually switching from natural gas-based to coal gasification technologies developed by China.
