= New energy vehicles in South Africa =

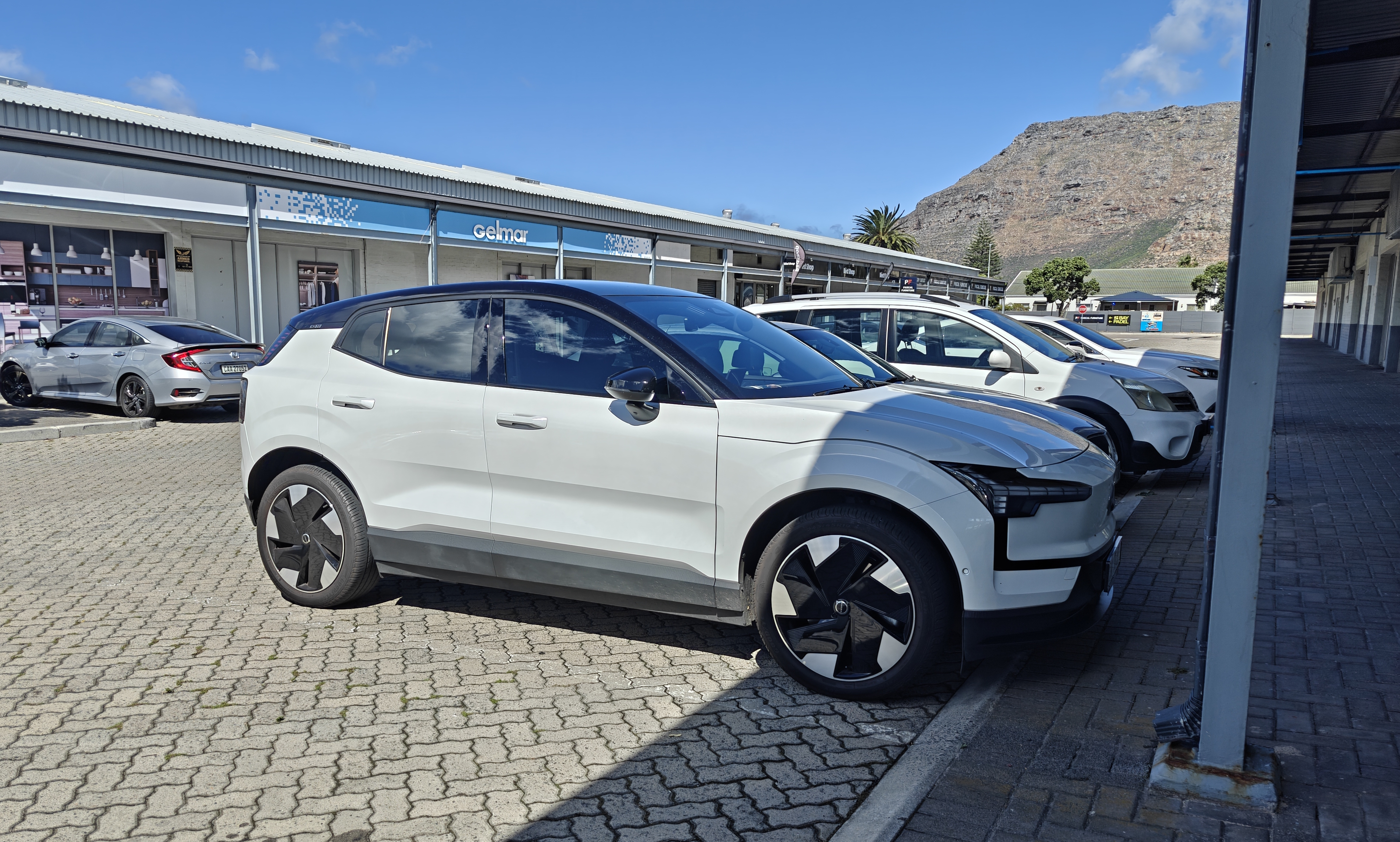
A Volvo EX30 battery electric compact crossover in Cape Town

New energy vehicles have gradually become more popular in South Africa, with sales increasing significantly in recent years. The country has a thriving automotive industry, and its public charging infrastructure continues to expand, including fast chargers and those dedicated to electric trucks.

Multiple NEV infrastructure companies exist in SA, including local ones such as GridCars, Rubicon, Charge, Black Tower Energy, and Chargify.

South Africa has an array of new passenger NEV models on sale, from a variety of manufacturers. These include models from legacy manufacturers such as Toyota, Lexus, and Volvo, as well ones newer to the local market, like BYD, Geely, and Leapmotor.

A number of local companies operating fleet vehicles are also shifting towards electrification. Examples of home delivery fleets that include NEVs are those operated by Takealot, Checkers, Woolworths, DHL, UPD (Clicks), and FedEx.

== Charging infrastructure ==
=== Public chargers ===
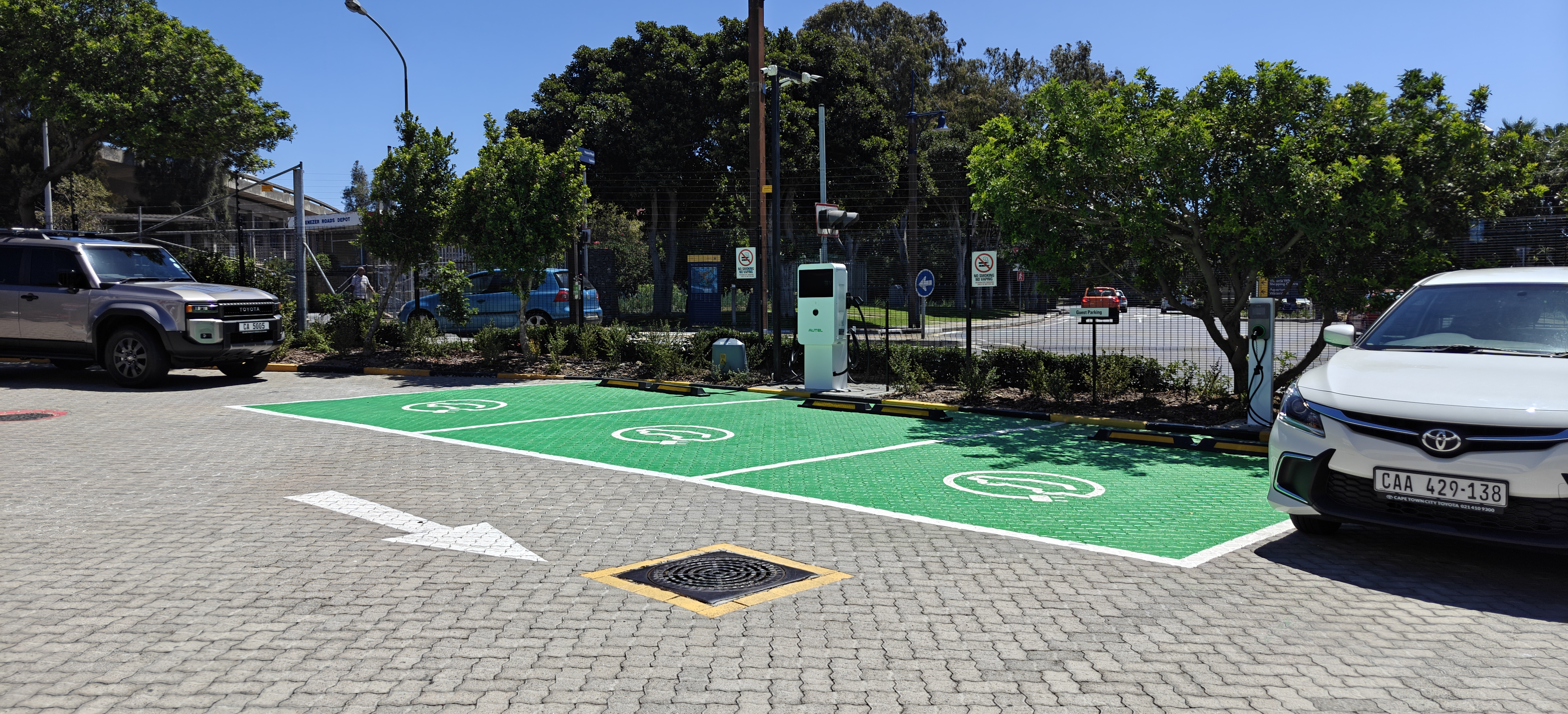
Newly-built EV charging stations at the Toyota and Lexus Cape Town City dealerships, in February 2026

South Africa has a small, but growing EV charging station network. There is no direct government infrastructure spending on EV charging, and SA therefore has a patchwork of private charging sites. Investment in infrastructure is increasing.

As of October 2025, there are estimated to be at least 400 public EV charging stations across South Africa (although this figure is unverified, and does not distinguish charging stations from connectors/points), roughly 60% of which are operated by local company GridCars.

Numerous proof of concept high-capacity DC chargers are installed at sites across SA, including the three 240 kW chargers at Charge's N12 North West facility, Rubicon's 200 kW station at the Mall of Africa in Midrand, and their 150 kW one at Canal Walk and Somerset Mall in Cape Town.

The cost of installing a charging station is estimated to be between R500,0000 and R2 million. To reach profitability, SA will need around 100,000 EVs on the road.

As of 2025, there are around 3,500 new EVs sold per year in South Africa. Sales are expected to grow steadily, as new models are introduced into the market. At the same time, the industry was estimated to already be worth R2.8 billion.

In May 2026, Charge and Volvo set a new electric car charging record in South Africa. At the launch of the Charge N3 Tugela station in KZN, a Volvo ES90 achieved a maximum charging speed of 321.28kW. The vehicle charged from 9% to 80% in 21 minutes. A total of 67.95kWh was added to its battery, equivalent to around 320 km of range.

The country's charging network comprises, among other initiatives, the following operators. The list is ranked from largest to smallest number of currently active chargers.

- GridCars' DC fast-charging network across SA
  - Active charging stations: 350+
  - Planned charging stations: Unknown
- Rubicon
  - Active charging stations: 100
  - Planned charging stations: Unknown
- Chargify
  - Active charging stations: 30
  - Planned charging stations: Unknown
- Black Tower Energy (partnership between RMB and Red Rocket)
  - Active charging stations: 12
  - Planned charging stations: 80+ in 2026
- Charge's network of solar-powered stations, with R100 million investment from the Development Bank of Southern Africa
  - Active charging stations: 1
  - Planned charging stations: 120 for passenger vehicles (at 150 km intervals, along major highways), and a further 120 for electric trucks
- BYD's Super e-Platform Megawatt Flash Chargers, with solar power and battery energy storage systems
  - Active charging stations: 0
  - Planned charging stations: Between 200 and 300 in 2026, with more thereafter
- Eskom and BYD's partnered public chargers
  - Active charging stations: 0
  - Planned charging stations: 55 by the end of 2027
- National Automobile Association of South Africa (NAASA)
  - Active charging stations: 0
  - Planned charging stations: 100 between the end of 2030 and 2032

=== Charger payment apps ===
South Africa's public EV charging payment apps include:

- ChargePocket, by GridCars
- Rubicon Charge, by Rubicon
- Charge, by Charge
- PlugShare, by Recargo

Companies participating in the Open Charge Point Interface standard, such as GridCars and Rubicon, allow for interoperability, through a roaming registry, between their chargers and payment facilities.

=== At-home charging ===
At-home alternating current (AC) charging can be done using two methods; standard plug sockets or dedicated, wall-mounted chargers (for faster charging speeds).

SA operates a 230V electricity network, and regular outlets are limited to 16A, as per SANS-164 and newer SANS 164-2 standards.

For a regular power outlet, charging is therefore limited to 3.7 kW (with the exact number depending on the amperage of the socket).

Dedicated at-home EV chargers are available locally with speeds ranging from 7.4 kW to 22 kW. These require the installation of a dedicated a connection supporting over 16A of current (i.e., an "industrial outlet").

== Available hybrids and EVs ==
As of 2026, vehicle manufacturers offering plug-in hybrids and/or full EVs in South Africa include:

Vehicle manufacturers offering plug-in hybrids and/or full EVs in South Africa (as at February 2026)
Manufacturer	Models with a PHEV / full EV variant	Country of manufacturer's (and parent company's) HQ	Ref
Toyota	bZ4X, RAV4	Japan	
Lexus	RZ, RX, NX	Japan	
Omoda	C7, C9	China	
Leapmotor	C10	China	
Chery	Tiggo 7	China	
Jaecoo	J5, J7	China	
Lepas	L8	China	
BYD	Sealion 5, Sealion 6, Dolphin Surf	China	
MG	Cyberster	UK (China)	
Haval	H6, H6 GT	China	
Ora	03, 5	China	
Geely	E2, E5	China	
Volvo	EX30	Sweden (China)	
BMW	M5, 7 Series, X1, X3, X5, i4, i5, i7, iX3, iX1, iX	Germany	
Mercedes-Benz	C-Class, E-Class, S-Class	Germany	
Volkswagen	Caravelle	Germany	
16 manufacturers	39 models	5 countries	-

=== PHEV market composition ===
Until late 2025, South Africa’s PHEV market was dominated by European premium manufacturers. BMW led the segment with plug-in versions of the X1, X3, and X5 models, all priced above R1 million, with Volvo and Jaguar Land Rover also offering plug-in hybrid variants. The segment’s high entry price effectively restricted it to upper-income buyers for most of this period.

A significant dimension of BMW’s PHEV presence in South Africa is that the BMW X3 xDrive30e is manufactured at BMW Group Plant Rosslyn, north of Pretoria. From October 2024, Rosslyn became the only production facility in BMW Group’s global network to manufacture the fourth-generation BMW X3 as a plug-in hybrid, with approximately 96% of output destined for export to more than 40 international markets. The plant invested R4.2 billion in electrification and digitalisation to prepare for PHEV production, directly securing more than 20 000 jobs across BMW Group South Africa and its supply chain.

The arrival of Chinese manufacturers transformed the affordability of the segment from late 2024. BYD, Chery, Geely, Haval, Jaecoo, and Omoda all launched PHEV models in South Africa at prices substantially below those of their European counterparts. In December 2025, the BYD Sealion 5 became the first PHEV in South Africa to be priced below R500 000, with a claimed electric-only range of 52 km and a combined range exceeding 1000km.

Other notable entrants include the Haval H6 GT PHEV, with a claimed electric-only range of 180 km, the Jaecoo J7 SHS with a 90km electric range and DC fast-charging capability, and the Omoda C9 PHEV, with a 150 km electric range and a 34.5 kWh battery. Chinese manufacturers accounted for 27% of PHEV sales in the first half of 2025, more than double their market share from the previous year. In 2025, BYD also introduced the Shark 6, the first plug-in hybrid double-cab bakkie sold in South Africa, entering a body style that consistently accounts for the largest share of new vehicle sales in the country.

== South African EV industry ==
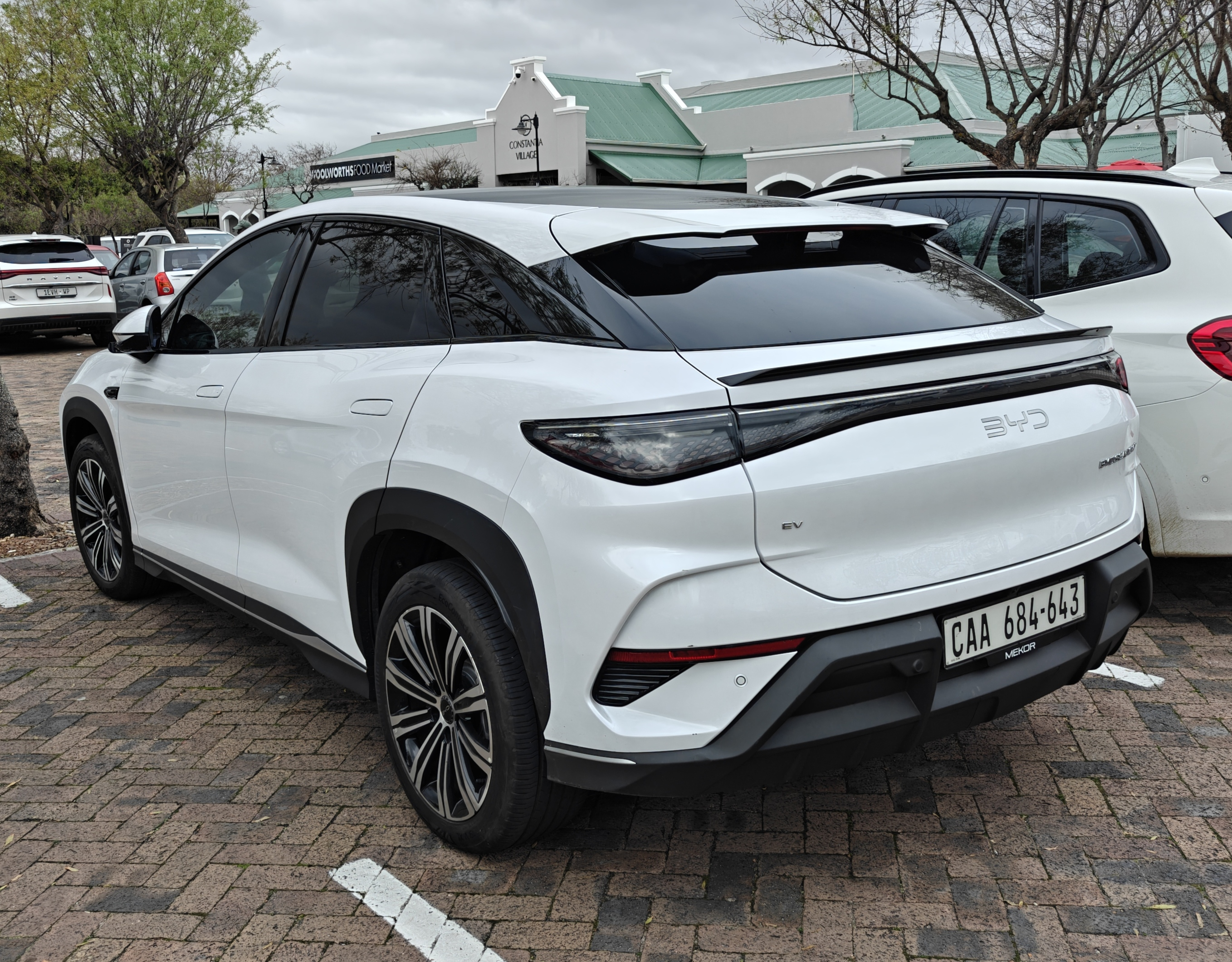
BYD Sealion 7 EV in Cape Town

In July 2026, the South African National Energy Development Institute (SANEDI) launched a 5-year initiative aimed at developing both the technical capabilities and the infrastructure needed to support a South African battery electric vehicle value chain. Part of the Department of Electricity and Energy (DEE), SANEDI's mission is to advance the local innovation of clean energy solutions, and support SA's decarbonization efforts.

The initiative is funded by the Global Environment Facility, and will be implemented by SANEDI in partnership with the UN Industrial Development Organization (UNIDO). Its focus will be on battery testing and certification, recycling, quality assurance, as well as investment opportunities linked to local manufacturing and mineral beneficiation.

UNIDO said the shift towards electric transportation was an industrial transformation, not just a transport or environmental issue. SANEDI stated that South Africa has the industrial capability, technical expertise, and access to minerals required to be able to play a significant role in the global battery value chain.

== Government policy ==
The green economy has been identified as a means to renew the economy. The African Energy Skills Roadmap has identified 90 priority occupations required for renewable energy, and it is estimated that 120000 jobs will be created within the automotive sector. Core, intermediate and technical occupations will require new learning pathways the government are proposing an expanded set of interventions to boost these priority occupations.

=== Incentives ===
As of 2022, the national government in South Africa does not offer any tax incentives for electric vehicles, and charges a 25% tariff on electric vehicle imports (compared with 18% for gasoline-powered cars).

=== Power generation ===
As of May 2022, electric car usage in South Africa emits more greenhouse gas on average than gasoline-powered car usage due to the prevalence of coal in electricity generation.

=== Public charging ===
In March 2026, a SANRAL policy opened for public comment formalized public EV charging and battery swapping facilities, placing them in the same category as gas stations. Also, the South African Government stated that its whitepaper position is that all new and upgraded forecourts should include EV chargers.

== NEV sales ==
Hybrid electric vehicles, such as parallel hybrids, have significantly increased in popularity in recent years, and have increased as a share of the new passenger vehicle market. Plug-in hybrid electric vehicles (PHEV)s and Battery electric vehicles (BEVs) are also gaining in popularity.

These three drivetrain types are combined to form the category of new energy vehicles (NEVs). The below table shows how NEVs have risen from less than 0.1% of new passenger vehicle sales in SA in 2020, to around 3% just five years later.

=== Sales data ===
Year	Total vehicle sales	HEVs sold	PHEVs sold	BEVs sold	Total NEVs	NEVs as % of total sales	Ref
2020	380,065	101	131	92	324	0.09%	
2021	464,322	624	54	218	896	0.19%	
2022	529,335	4,066	126	502	4,694	0.89%	
2023	531,552	6,485	368	929	7,782	1.46%	
2024	516,103	13,616	738	1,257	15,611	3.02%	
2025	597,338	12,818	2,810	1,088	16,716	2.80%	

=== Top-selling models ===
The ranking of top-selling NEVs in SA has changed substantially in recent years, especially following the launch of several affordable BYD models.

Top-selling new PHEVs
Rank	August 2025	Sales	April 2026	Sales	Ref
1	Haval H6	70	Haval H6	164	
2	Chery Tiggo 7	50	BYD Sealion 6	148	
3	Jaecoo J7	49	BYD Shark 6	108	
4	Chery Tiggo 8	33	Chery Tiggo 7	105	
5	Omoda C9	32	BYD Sealion 5	90	

Top-selling new BEVs
Rank	August 2025	Sales	April 2026	Sales	Ref
1	Mercedes-Benz EQE	10	BYD Dolphin Surf	302	
2	Volvo EX30	8	Volvo EX30	15	
3	Volvo XC40	7	BYD Sealion 7	14	
4	Mercedes-Benz EQA	5	Changan Hunter	13	
5	—	—	BYD Atto 3	11	

== See also ==
- Automotive industry in South Africa
