= List of largest coal mining companies =

The largest coal mining companies of the world are found in several countries, the most prominent among them being the United States, Australia, India and China. This article avoids listing companies like Glencore or Trafigura which are essentially trading companies or holding companies; they are not actual mining companies.

== Largest coal mining companies of the world ==
Both private and public companies are included in this list.

Rank	Company	Revenue (billion USD)	Year	Industry	Country	References
1	BHP	43.6	2021	Coal mining	Australia	
2	Rio Tinto	40.7	2021	Coal mining	Australia United Kingdom	
3	China Shenhua Energy	37.6	2021	Coal mining	China	
4	Anglo American plc	27.7	2021	Coal mining	United Kingdom	
5	Coal India	14.5	2021	Coal mining	India	
6	NTPC Limited	10.5	2021	Coal mining	India	
7	Sasol	10.1	2021	Coal mining	South Africa	
8	Shaanxi Coal and Chemical Industry	8.6	2021	Coal mining	China	
9	Teck Resources	8.1	2021	Coal mining	Canada	

== See also ==
- List of largest manufacturing companies by revenue
- List of public corporations by market capitalization
- List of largest chemical producers
