= NetFlorist =

South African florist

- The NetFlorist homepage, showing features for Valentine's Day 2026
- Industry: Floristry; E-commerce
- Founded: 1999; 27 years ago
- Headquarters: Midrand, Gauteng, South Africa
- Area served: Worldwide
- Key people: Ryan Bacher (Co-founder and Managing Director)
- Products: Online florist
- Website: www.netflorist.co.za

NetFlorist is a South African company providing online ordering of flowers and other kinds of gifts for delivery. It is the country's largest flower and gift service, and oldest active online store.

The company was founded in 1999, and is headquartered in Midrand, Gauteng.

== History ==
NetFlorist was founded by Ryan Bacher, Lawrence Brick, and Jonathan Hackner. In the mid-90s, Bacher was the sales manager at NetActive, an internet service provider (ISP) listed on the JSE, that was founded by Brick and Hackner. Part of NetActive was owned by major South African retail group Massmart, which owned large retail chains including like Game and Makro.

In 1999, Massmart wanted to put Makro online, and have them develop in the e-commerce realm – a space that was still in early stages of development in South Africa. Makro told NetActive to gain some experience with online retail, and then come back and build Makro's e-commerce site.

During their research, the three founders came across US online florist 1-800-Flowers, which served as the inspiration behind the idea for NetFlorist. With 2 weeks to go before Valentine’s Day, the team built a basic website in the span of 4 days. It featured 12 floral arrangements, credit card payments, one page, and a basic search bar that simply rerouted users to the same single web page.

Leveraging their ISP database, the founders sent out an email advertising their new flower delivery service that was supplied by a florist in Cape Town. Despite having no stock or expertise in floristry, they made R30,000 (~ US$5,000) in sales in its first 2 weeks of operation in February — equivalent to a month’s worth of orders for a single florist.

The success led to the team declining to build Makro's website, and instead keeping NetFlorist online after Valentine's Day. They subsequently grew their supply chain, set up a call center, and launched an affiliate program.

Initially, the company relied entirely on a network of independent florists across South Africa to fulfil its online orders. The model allowed NetFlorist to operate without holding any stock, and to instead focus solely on their website and marketing.

Between 2001 and 2003, NetFlorist was purely focused on gaining traction in the market, and affiliate marketing played a key role in the company’s survival and growth. NetFlorist partnered with major local corporations including MTN, Woolworths, and Standard Bank, enabling the companies to sell flowers through their websites.

NetFlorist handled all the backend operations while the partner company focused on marketing. This ensured that NetFlorist had no upfront marketing costs, paying a percentage of sales only when a transaction occurred. By partnering with established brands, NetFlorist was able to acquire customers and drive sales when the e-commerce market was still in its infancy, at a time when many online startups were failing.

As the company matured, the NetFlorist team noticed that they had little control over their own brand, with the vast majority of orders coming from a few large contracts, and consumers having little awareness of who NetFlorist was. Thus, the company decided to transition from being an e-commerce site to a full-fledged retailer.

NetFlorist initially relied on a network of independent florists, but as the business grew, service levels were impacted by the florists’ system limitations.

Thus, in 2007, the company brought its suppliers, drivers, and florists in-house, growing from 11 to 150 employees in a year.

In 2008, NetFlorist established their own warehouse in Johannesburg, followed by one in Cape Town, allowing for better control over the supply chain, improved service, and higher margins. Recognizing the limitations of the flower market, they expanded into hampers, jewelry, perfumes, personalized items, and launched a bakery to capture a larger share of the gifting market.

In 2017, UK-based research institute Euromonitor International published a research report titled, Internet Retailing in South Africa, wherein NetFlorist was ranked as the 11th largest online store in South Africa, with 1.5% market share for online sales. This equated to around 2,000 orders received per day.

In the same year, NetFlorist partnered with Uber Eats for gift deliveries. It also partnered with Krispy Kreme in 2017, to offer donut deliveries in Johannesburg North, with plans to expand the service nationwide.

In April 2020, during a South African lockdown to ensure safety during the COVID-19 pandemic, NetFlorist announced that it would be pausing gift deliveries until after the lockdown, and instead prioritizing the delivery of essential goods, including fresh fruit, vegetables, tea, coffee, baby products, and other pantry and refrigerator essentials.

Within 3 days, NetFlorist introduced a fresh produce delivery service in partnership with Fruitspot, with delivery available in South Africa's 4 largest cities; Johannesburg, Cape Town, Durban, and Pretoria. It then partnered with Makro to deliver other groceries.

== Operations ==
NetFlorist operates its on-demand ordering florist service via an e-commerce website, with an in-house logistics division, and has hubs in 4 major cities in South Africa; Cape Town, Durban, Pretoria, and Johannesburg. Products are delivered worldwide.

Aside from flowers, the company also sells jewelry, food, perfume, liquor, plants, clothing, baked goods, and other personalized items, intended for gifting.

As of March 2025, NetFlorist sources 70% of its flowers in South Africa and the other 30% from the rest of Africa.

== Corporate social responsibility ==
In recognition of World Rhino Day, in September 2025, NetFlorist collaborated with GoRhino and Project Rhino on a campaign with the goal of combatting rhinoceros poaching.

== Criticism ==
NetFlorist was criticized by a media outlet in 2019 for its Valentine's Day red rose pricing. The media outlet found NetFlorist's roses to be between 50% and 150% more expensive than those from major South African retailers Pick n Pay, Checkers, and Woolworths.

== See also ==
- Biodiversity of South Africa
- Lists of flowering plants of South Africa
- Cape Floristic Region
- Biodiversity of Cape Town
- Fynbos
- South African National Biodiversity Institute
