= Mahindra Susten =

Indian renewable energy company

- Formerly: Mahindra EPC Services Pvt. Ltd.
- Type: Private
- Industry: Renewable energy
- Founded: 2010; 16 years ago
- Headquarters: Marol, Andheri, Mumbai, Maharashtra, India
- Area served: Worldwide
- Services: Solar power plants, Solar telecom towers, turnkey EPC solutions
- Number of employees: 800 (2016-17)
- Parent: Mahindra & Mahindra Limited
- Website: www.mahindrasusten.com
- Footnotes; Installation: 2499 MWp

Mahindra Susten (formerly Mahindra EPC Services Pvt. Ltd.) is an Indian company in renewable energy industry and is part of the Mahindra Group. They are a portfolio company under the Cleantech arm of Mahindra Partners.

In April 2013, Mahindra EPC had its 20 MW solar power project at Bikaner enlisted in the Ministry of New and Renewable Energy's MNRE (India) merit list for early commissioning for Phase I, Batch II of the National Solar Mission.

On 2 February 2015, the company was renamed Mahindra Susten. Susten is derived from the words Sustainability and Enabler.

== History ==
Logo of the company when it was known as Mahindra EPC

The company commenced its services in 2011 in the renewable energy space with the turnkey execution of utility scale, commercial, and industrial rooftop Solar PV projects.

In 2011, the company received the highest CRISIL–MNRE rating of SP1A for off-grid solar PV system. The company diversified its business into telecom tower solarization, which are presently run on diesel.

Mahindra Susten has also been named the Utility Solar EPC of the year for 2014 and 2015 by Bridge to India.

== Solar power plants ==
=== Distributed and Utility scale ===
Mahindra Susten built utility scale and distributed solar PV plants for clients including Softbank, SunEdison, Infosys, JK Tyres, Tech Mahindras.

=== Auto Consortium Project, Tamil Nadu, India ===
Mahindra EPC in November 2013, finished installation of a 3.18 MWp solar PV power plant for an Auto Consortium in the state of Tamil Nadu. With an estimated total project capacity of 50 MWp, this group of India's seven leading auto component manufacturers have pledged an investment of over INR₹3.25 billion for captive consumption of clean energy.

=== 30 MW Solar PV Thin Film Plant near Jodhpur, Rajasthan, India ===
Comprising two separate projects of 10 MW and 20 MW, this installation under the second batch of Phase I of the Jawaharlal Nehru National Solar Mission (JNNSM), was commissioned in February 2013. With an annual generation in excess of 50 million units of energy this installation is expected to generate a carbon offset of nearly 40,000 MT of CO_{2} annually.

=== 20 MW Solar PV Thin Film Plant near Bikaner, Rajasthan, India ===
In January 2013, Mahindra EPC commissioned their 20 MW plant near Bikaner which was then the first installation to have been completed under the Indian government’s JNNSM Phase 1 Batch 2 initiative. The project utilizes a total of 270,000 thin-film PV modules supplied by First Solar. Spread across an area of 180 acres, the 20MWp solar PV plant is equipped to supply more than 38 million units of energy per year and is expected to displace nearly 30,000 MT of CO_{2} annually.

=== 5 MW Solar PV Single Axis Tracker Plant near Jodhpur, Rajasthan, India ===
Near Jodhpur, this 5 MW installation generates a high output per MW with its single axis tracker technology that maximises energy from the sun. Under the Indian government’s JNNSM Phase 1 Batch 1 initiative, the plant was the first to get connected to the state’s electrical grid, having been commissioned in January 2012.

=== 2 MW Solar PV Thin Film Plant at Lucknow in Uttar Pradesh, India ===
The plant at Lucknow was the first megawatt-scale installation in Uttar Pradesh (northern India), and was connected to the grid in January 2012, with a construction period of 71 days.

== Single Axis Solar Tracker (MSAT100) ==
Mahindra Susten has developed products aimed at increasing the efficiency and throughputs of Solar PV plants across all scales. The MSAT100 is an indigenously designed and developed tracker which can help to substantially increase the generation potential of any solar setup. The company has supplied 500+ trackers & installed 226.04+ MW tracker at sites in Tamil Nadu, Andhra Pradesh, Telangana, and Thailand.
