= Power purchase agreement =

Contract between two parties for the sale of electricity

A power purchase agreement (PPA), or electricity power agreement, is a long-term contract between an electricity generator and a customer, usually a utility, government or company. PPAs may last anywhere between 5 and 20 years, during which time the power purchaser buys energy at a pre-negotiated price. Such agreements play a key role in the financing of independently owned (i.e. not owned by a utility) electricity generators, especially producers of renewable energy like solar farms or wind farms.

PPA contracts can either be for a pre-defined amount of electricity or for a pre-defined portion of whatever quantity of electricity the seller generates. In either case, the price can be a fixed amount per kilowatt-hour or fluctuate with market rates, depending on the specific terms of the contract.

In the case of distributed generation (where the generator is located on a building site and energy is sold to the building occupant), commercial PPAs have evolved as a variant that enables businesses, schools, and governments to purchase electricity directly from the generator rather than from the utility. This approach facilitates the financing of distributed generation assets such as photovoltaic, micro-turbines, reciprocating engines, and fuel cells. More than 137 firms in 32 countries reported the signing of power purchase agreements in 2021.

In Australia, onsite PPAs typically take the form of rooftop solar panels on commercial premises, which are designed and built by a solar EPC who then manages and maintains the asset, selling the energy back to the business customer for the lifetime of the agreement.

== Structure ==
=== Parties involved ===
Under a PPA, the seller is the entity that owns the project. In most cases, the seller is organized as a special purpose entity whose main purpose is to facilitate non-recourse project financing.

The buyer is typically a utility or a company that purchases the electricity to meet its customers' needs. In the case of distributed generation involving a commercial PPA variant, the buyer may be the occupant of the building—a business, school, or government for example. Electricity traders may also enter into a PPA with the Seller.

=== Delivery point ===
The sale of electricity under a PPA can occur at various physical points of the electrical grid. This is usually pre-defined by the contract. A common approach is to sell the electricity directly where the generator connects to the grid (a so-called "busbar" sale). In this type of transaction, the buyer is responsible for transmission of the energy from the seller. Alternatively, the PPA can distinguish another delivery point agreed upon by both parties, in which case the seller is responsible for transmission. More complex arrangements, where the generator feeds electricity into one point of the grid and the buyer withdraws electricity from another point, also exist. Since prices often differ at different points of the grid, the PPA contract for such arrangements specifies how the price difference is split.

=== Pricing ===
Electricity rates are agreed upon as the basis for a PPA. Prices may be flat, escalate over time, or be negotiated in any other way as long as both parties agree to the negotiation. In a regulated environment, an Electricity Regulator will regulate the price. A PPA will often specify how much energy the supplier is expected to produce each year and any excess energy produced will have a negative impact on the sales rate of electricity that the buyer will be purchasing. This system is intended to provide an incentive for the seller to properly estimate the amount of energy that will be produced in a given period of time.

=== Performance terms ===
The buyer will typically require the seller to guarantee that the project will meet certain performance standards. If the electricity output fails to meet that specified by the PPA, the seller is responsible for retributing such costs. Other guarantees may include availability guarantees and power-curve guarantees. These are more applicable in regions where energy sources, such as some types of renewable energy, are more volatile.

=== Pay-as-produced and baseload PPAs ===
In addition to structural distinctions such as physical and virtual PPAs, renewable energy projects often utilize different delivery-based PPA structures depending on project characteristics and buyer requirements. Two common structural PPA types are pay-as-produced and baseload PPAs.

Pay-as-produced PPAs are typical for variable generation assets such as wind and solar farms. Under this structure, the off-taker agrees to purchase all electricity as it is generated, regardless of fluctuations due to weather or other factors. This structure transfers generation risk to the buyer and is considered favorable for project developers seeking predictable revenue streams.

By contrast, baseload PPAs specify a fixed amount of electricity that must be delivered on a continuous or scheduled basis. In this arrangement, the seller assumes responsibility for meeting delivery commitments, which may involve using energy storage or supplementary sources to manage variability. Baseload PPAs are more commonly used when the off-taker requires steady and predictable electricity supply.

== Regulation ==
=== Central and Eastern Europe ===
In Central and Eastern Europe (CEE), the adoption of corporate PPAs has been characterized by several regional milestones in the integration of cross-border and hybrid structures. In 2022, a 20-year agreement was signed between Enery and Lenzing AG in Austria to support industrial decarbonization. This was followed by the first cross-border PPA in the CEE region for Dreher Breweries in Hungary, and the first corporate PPA in Slovakia, signed by the Šariš Brewery.

The region's first hybrid PPA, combining multiple renewable energy services, was established through a 15-year tenor with Teva Pharmaceuticals in 2024. Other long-term industrial contracts in the region include a 12-year partnership in Bulgaria with KCM AD.

=== Germany ===
The German Energy Agency (Deutsche Energie-Agentur) has argued that PPAs are central to the German energiewende and require better regulatory support.

=== United Kingdom ===
In the UK, PPAs are regulated by the Department for Business, Energy & Industrial Strategy (BEIS).

=== United States ===
In the United States, PPAs are typically subject to regulation by the Federal Energy Regulatory Commission (FERC). FERC determines which facilities are applicable for PPAs under the Energy Policy Act of 2005. PPAs facilitate the financing of distributed generation assets such as photovoltaic, microturbines, reciprocating engines, and fuel cells.

PPAs are typically subject to regulation at the state and federal level to varying degrees depending on the nature of the PPA and the extent to which the sale of electricity is regulated where the project is sited. In the U.S., FERC determines which facilities are considered to be exempt wholesale generators (EWG) or qualifying facilities and are applicable for PPAs under the Energy Policy Act of 2005.

PPAs are more prevalent in the United States. However, in recent years, this type of financing has gained pace in the European Union, where it has been utilized to fund about 9 GW of output, headed by significant contracts in Spain and Scandinavia.

== Use ==
Power purchase agreements (PPAs) may be appropriate where:

- the projected revenue of the project is uncertain and so some guarantees as to quantities purchased and price paid are required to make the project financially viable;
- protection from cheaper or subsidized domestic or international competition (e.g., where a neighboring power plant is producing cheaper power) is desired;
- there is one, or there are, a few major customers that will be taking the bulk of the product. For example, where a government may be purchasing the power generated by a power plant, the government will want to understand how much it will be paying for its power and that it has the first call on that power, and the project company will want certainty of revenue;
- the purchaser wishes to secure security of supply;
- with solar power projects in non-profit companies in order to reduce costs for installation of the solar energy system.

== Financing ==
The PPA is often regarded as the central document in the development of independent electricity generating assets (power plants). Because it defines the revenue terms for the project and credit quality, it is key to obtaining non-recourse project financing.

One of the key benefits of the PPA is that by clearly defining the output of the generating assets (such as a solar electric system) and the credit of its associated revenue streams, a PPA can be used by the PPA provider to raise non-recourse financing from a bank or other financing counterparty.

Funding for PPAs comes from various sources depending on the location of the project, the companies involved and available sources. Non-profit and for-profit PPA funders operate, for example, in Australia: PPA pioneers Smart Commercial Energy fund their commercial PPAs largely via the not-for-profit community investment vehicle, Clear Skies Solar Investment.

== Operation and metering ==
Maintenance and operation of a generation project is the responsibility of the seller. This includes regular inspection and repair, if necessary, to ensure prudent practices. Liquidated damages will be applied if the seller fails to meet these circumstances. Typically, the seller is also responsible for installing and maintaining a meter to determine the quantity of output that will be sold. Under this circumstance, the seller must also provide real-time data at the request of the buyer, including atmospheric data relevant to the type of technology installed.

== Example contracts ==
A basic sample PPA between the Bonneville Power Administration and a wind power generating entity was developed as a reference for future PPAs. Solar PPAs are now being successfully utilized in the California Solar Initiative's Multifamily Affordable Solar Housing (MASH) program. This aspect of the successful CSI program was just recently opened for applications.

PPAs can be managed in the European market by service providers, including tendering platforms such as Renewabl Trade that run competitive procurement processes for corporate buyers at contract intervals from annual to hourly. The legal agreements between the statewide power sectors (seller) and the trader (buyer/who buys large quantity of power) will be treated as the PPA in power sector.

Data center owners Amazon, Google, and Microsoft have used PPAs to offset the emissions and power usage of cloud computing. Amazon has signed power purchase agreements with 44 renewable energy projects in nine countries, totaling 6.2 GW in 2021, following its commitment to power its facilities with 100% renewable energy by 2030 and zero carbon emissions by 2040. Some manufacturers with heavy carbon emission footprints and energy usage such as Anheuser-Busch InBev have also shown interest in PPAs. In 2017, Anheuser-Busch InBev agreed to purchase using a PPA from the utility company Iberdrola in Mexico for 220 MW of new wind power capacity.

Recently, a new form of PPA was proposed to commercialize electric vehicle charging stations through a bi-lateral form of power purchase agreement.

Additionally, an innovative evolution of the PPA, the MESA ("Matched Energy Supply Agreement") has been introduced in Australia based on time matching technology which enables clean energy to be readily used by organisations without direct access to renewable energy sources.

The European Federation of Energy Traders (EFET) has released a set of CPPA Standard Documentation. Further research in this area is anticipated to benefit the PPA industry.

In South Africa, the energy grid is undergoing significant transformation, with independent power producers increasing in number, and numerous different local energy wheeling companies facilitating trading of the electricity the IPPs generate. As part of its Integrated Resource Plan 2025, South Africa is shifting towards more renewable energy sources, and away from coal.

Numerous power purchase agreements have been signed between IPPs and direct corporate clients in SA. Examples of such agreements include those signed by IPP SOLA Group and major South African companies Woolworths, Growthpoint Properties, Vodacom, African Rainbow Minerals, Sasol, and Air Liquide, as well as the national Department of Tourism.

== See also ==
- Feed-in tariff
- Project finance
- Renewable energy commercialization
- Renewable energy policy
- Renewable portfolio standard
