= Independent power producer =

Entity generating power to sell to utilities

An independent power producer (IPP) or non-utility generator (NUG) is an entity that is not a public utility, but owns facilities that generate electric power for sale to utilities and end users.

NUGs may be privately-held facilities, corporations, cooperatives such as rural solar or wind energy producers, or non-energy industrial concerns capable of feeding excess energy into the system.

An independent water and power producer (IWPP) is similar to an IPP, but operates a unified process to also output usable treated water.

== Economic situation ==
For most IPPs, particularly in the renewable energy industry, a feed-in tariff or power purchase agreement provides a long-term price guarantee.

IPPs have been successful in driving the electricity sector's transition to renewables globally, owning the majority of the currently operating renewable energy generation capacity.

== IPPs by country ==
=== Canada ===
Electricity regulation in Canada is governed at the provincial level, and there are differences between the provinces for how IPPs are integrated into the electric system.

In 2002, the government of British Columbia stipulated that new clean renewable energy generation in the province would be developed by independent power producers (IPPs) not BC Hydro, save for large hydro-electric facilities. IPPs now produce a significant proportion of the power generated in BC.

=== Germany ===
Rare in Germany for decades, the IPP business model has grown more common since the EEG (for renewable energy). Success in the approach depends on finding a partner for distributing the produced energy to the customer.

=== India ===
India also has many IPP's like ReNew Power, Adani, Onix Renewable, KPI Green Energy, Hero, Mytrah, Ostro, Greenko, Alfanar, Mahindra Susten, Jakson Ltd.Etc.

=== Pakistan ===
In 1994, the Government of Pakistan announced an investor-friendly policy to develop IPPs based on oil, coal and gas. Following the policy, 16 IPPs were established. The next year, a hydro power policy was announced, which resulted in the development of the country's first Hydro IPP.

In 2002, the new government adopted a new policy, under which another 12 IPPs began operations. For the development of Independent Power Producers (IPPs), Private Power and Infrastructure Board operates as one window facilitator on behalf of all the departments and Ministries of the Government of Pakistan to; process power projects in IPP mode, monitor their development, and facilitates in providing all required support on behalf of the Government of Pakistan.

In 2015, Pakistan adopted a new power policy by which another 13 IPPs were established, mostly by Chinese companies. A transmission policy for development of transmission line in the private sector was also announced.

More than 40 IPPs were operating in Pakistan as of 2018.

=== South Africa ===
The Renewable Energy Independent Power Producer Procurement Programme (REIPPPP) is an initiative by the South African government aimed at increasing electricity generation through private sector investment in solar photovoltaic and concentrated solar, onshore wind power, small hydro (<40 MW), landfill gas, biomass, and biogas. In 2021, there were 117 allocations, totaling 8891.86 MW for private sector generation.

The REIPPPP aligns with South Africa's newer Integrated Resources Plan (IRP) 2025, published in October of that year. The IRP aims to strengthen energy availability in South Africa, while minimizing its cost to the economy, and reducing the environmental impact of energy supply. IPPs form part of the new generation capacity in the IRP.

In recent years, numerous private companies have begun wheeling electricity directly from IPPs to commercial customers. These include EXSA, Ampli Energy, and SOLA Group.

Cape Town, one of SA's capitals, has incorporated significant procurement of energy from IPPs into its Energy Strategy for 2050. The City of Cape Town metro (local government) has explicitly stated its desire to shift away from relying on national power producer Eskom for Cape Town's energy needs, and towards IPPs and renewable energy sources, for increased self-sufficiency.

=== Taiwan ===
Taiwan's electricity market was liberalized in January 1995. In 2013, nine IPP companies were operating in Taiwan.

=== United States ===
NUGs were rare before the enactment of the US Public Utility Regulatory Policies Act (PURPA) of 1978. The few existing NUGs were seldom able to distribute power, as the cost of building the conveyance infrastructure was prohibitive. Public utilities generated power and owned the generating facilities, the transmission lines, and the local distribution-delivery systems. PURPA, however, established a class of non‐utility generators, called Qualifying Facilities (QFs), that were permitted to produce power for resale.

PURPA was intended to reduce domestic dependence on foreign energy, to encourage energy conservation, and to reduce the ability of electric utilities to abuse the purchase of power from QFs. A QF is defined as a generating facility that produces electricity and another form of useful thermal energy through the sequential use of energy, and meets certain ownership, operating, and efficiency criteria established by the Federal Energy Regulatory Commission (FERC).

Section 210 of PURPA now requires utilities to purchase energy from QFs at the utility's avoided cost. This allows QFs to receive a reasonable to excellent price for the energy they produce and ensures that energy generated by small producers won't be wasted.
