= Wheeling (electric power transmission) =

Electricity transmission through third-party lines

In electric power transmission, wheeling is the transmission of power from one system to another through the third-party interconnecting network. The wheeling provider, or utility, receives compensation for the service and for electricity losses incurred in the transmission. As an economic concept, wheeling combines the traits of opposing designs of the electricity market: as a regulated public utility and a competitive market.

Two types of wheeling are:

- wheel-through, where the electrical power generation and the electrical load are both outside the boundaries of the transmission system
- wheel-out, where the generation resource is inside the boundaries of the transmission system but the load is outside.

Wheeling often refers to the scheduling of the energy transfer from one balancing authority to another. The wheeling of electric energy requires use of a transmission system, often with an associated fee that goes to the transmission owners.

== Transmission ownership ==
Under deregulation, many vertically integrated utilities split into generation owners, transmission and distribution owners, and retail providers. To recover capital costs, operating costs and earn a return on investment, a transmission revenue requirement (TRR) is established and approved by a national agency (such as the US Federal Energy Regulatory Commission) for each transmission owner. The TRR is paid through transmission access charges (TACs), load-weighted fees charged to internal load and energy exports for use of the transmission facilities. The energy export fee is often referred to as a wheeling charge. When wheeling-through, the transmission access charge only applies to the exported amount.

== Wheeling charge ==
A wheeling charge is a currency per megawatt-hour amount that a transmission owner receives for the use of its system to export energy. The total amount due in TAC fees is determined by the following equation:

$Wheeling\ fee = Wc\ (\$/MWh) \times Pw\ (MW)$

Where 'Wc' is wheeling charge per unit. 'Pw' is the power in MW.

The fee associated with wheeling is referred to as a "wheeling charge." This is an amount computed as $/MWh that a transmission owner recovers for the use of its system. If the resource must cross multiple [transmission owner]s, it may be charged a wheeling charge for each one. Wheeling charges may be to:

- recover some costs of transmission facilities or compensate for added congestion
- keep prices low

For instance, if prices in Arizona are 30 $/MWh and prices in California are 50 $/MWh, resources in Arizona might want to sell to California to make more money. Arizona utilities would have to pay 50 $/MWh to keep these resources in the state. If Arizona charged a wheeling charge of $10 /MWh, Arizona would only have to pay $40 /MWh to compete. However, Arizona would not set the fee too high, as this could impact the advantages of trading electric energy between systems. In this way, wheeling charges work similarly to tariffs.

== See also ==
- Power outage
- V2G
