= Sasol =

South African integrated energy and chemical company

Sasol Limited

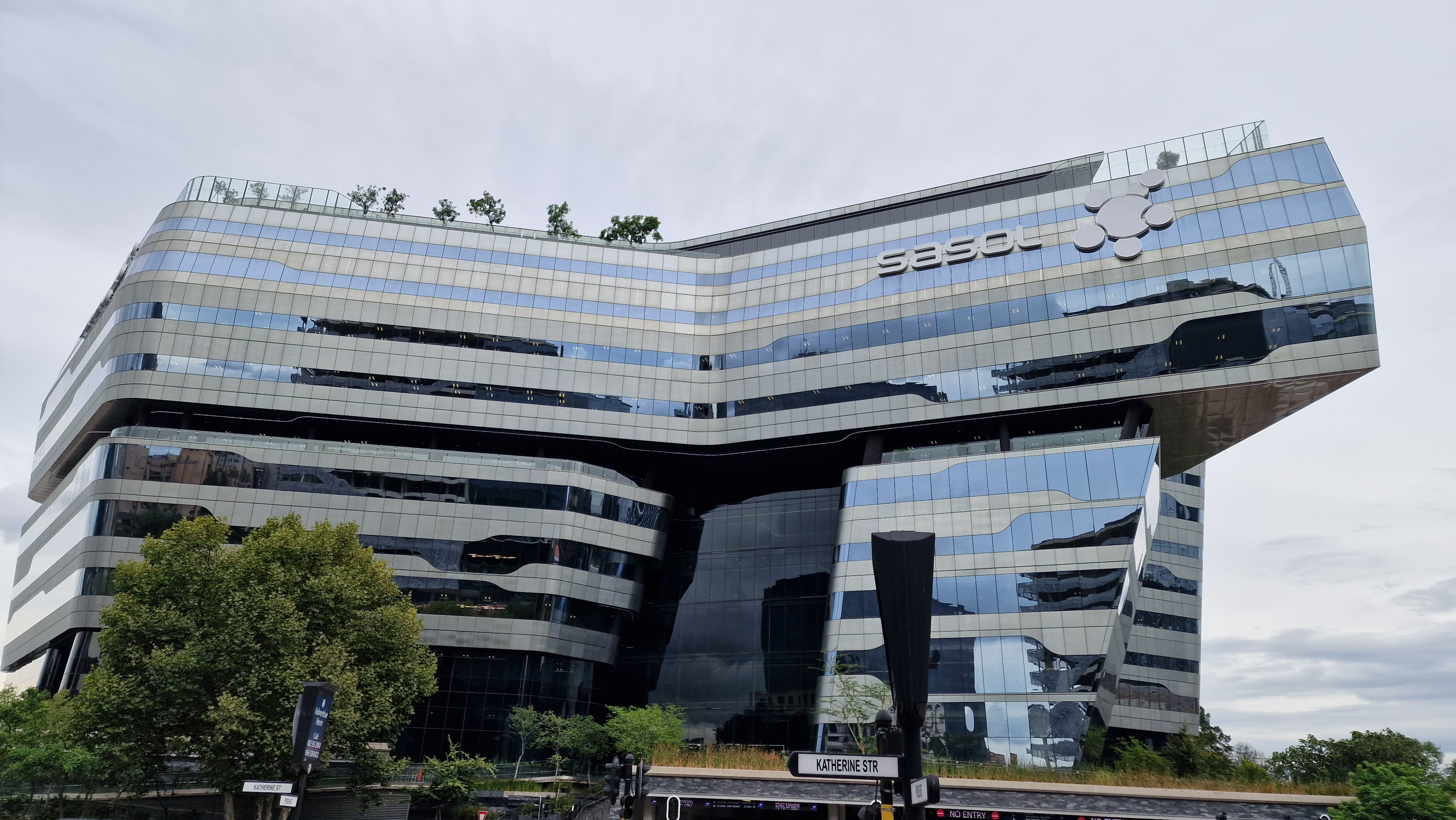
- Sasol headquarters in Sandton
- Trade name: Sasol
- Type: Public
- Traded as: JSE: SOL; NYSE: SSL
- Industry: Oil and gas Chemical; Coal tar
- Predecessor: Suid-Afrikaanse Steenkool-, Olie- en Gasmaatskappy
- Founded: 1950; 76 years ago
- Founder: Etienne Rousseau
- Headquarters: Sandton, South Africa
- Number of locations: 354 (2024)
- Area served: Africa; Asia; Europe; Oceania; United States
- Key people: Muriel Dube (Chairman); Simon Baloyi (CEO)
- Revenue: ▼ R249.09 billion (2025)
- Operating income: ▲ R18.81 billion (2025)
- Net income: ▲ R9.5 billion (2025)
- Total assets: ▼ R359.55 billion (2025)
- Total equity: ▲ R157.61 billion (2025)
- Number of employees: 27,411 (2025)
- Website: www.sasol.com

Sasol Limited, commonly referred to as Sasol, is an integrated energy and chemical company based in Sandton, South Africa.

The company was formed in 1950 in Sasolburg, South Africa, and built around coal liquefaction processes that German chemists and engineers first developed in the early 1900s. Today, Sasol develops and commercializes technologies, including synthetic fuel technologies, and produces different liquid fuels, chemicals, coal tar, and electricity.

Sasol is listed on the Johannesburg Stock Exchange (JSE: SOL) and the New York Stock Exchange (NYSE: SSL). Major shareholders include the South African Government Employees Pension Fund, Industrial Development Corporation of South Africa Limited (IDC), Allan Gray Investment Counsel, Coronation Fund Managers, Ninety One, and others.

Sasol employs over 27,000 people worldwide and has operations in 33 countries, as of 2026. It is the largest corporate taxpayer in South Africa, and the seventh-largest coal mining company in the world.

== History ==
=== The incorporation of Sasol ===
The previous Sasol logo

South Africa has large deposits of coal, which had low commercial value due to its high fly ash content. If this coal could be used to produce synthetic oil, petrol, and diesel fuel, it perhaps would have significant benefit to South Africa. In the 1920s, South African scientists started looking at the possibility of using coal as a source of liquid fuels. This work was pioneered by P. N. Lategan, working for the Transvaal Coal Owners Association. He completed his doctoral thesis from the Imperial College of Science in London on The Low-Temperature Carbonisation of South African Coal.

In 1927, a white paper from the government was issued describing various oil-from-coal processes being used overseas and their potential for South Africa. In the 1930s, a young scientist named Etienne Rousseau obtained a Master of Science from the University of Stellenbosch. His thesis was entitled "The Sulfur Content of Coals and Oil Shales." Rousseau became Sasol's first managing director.

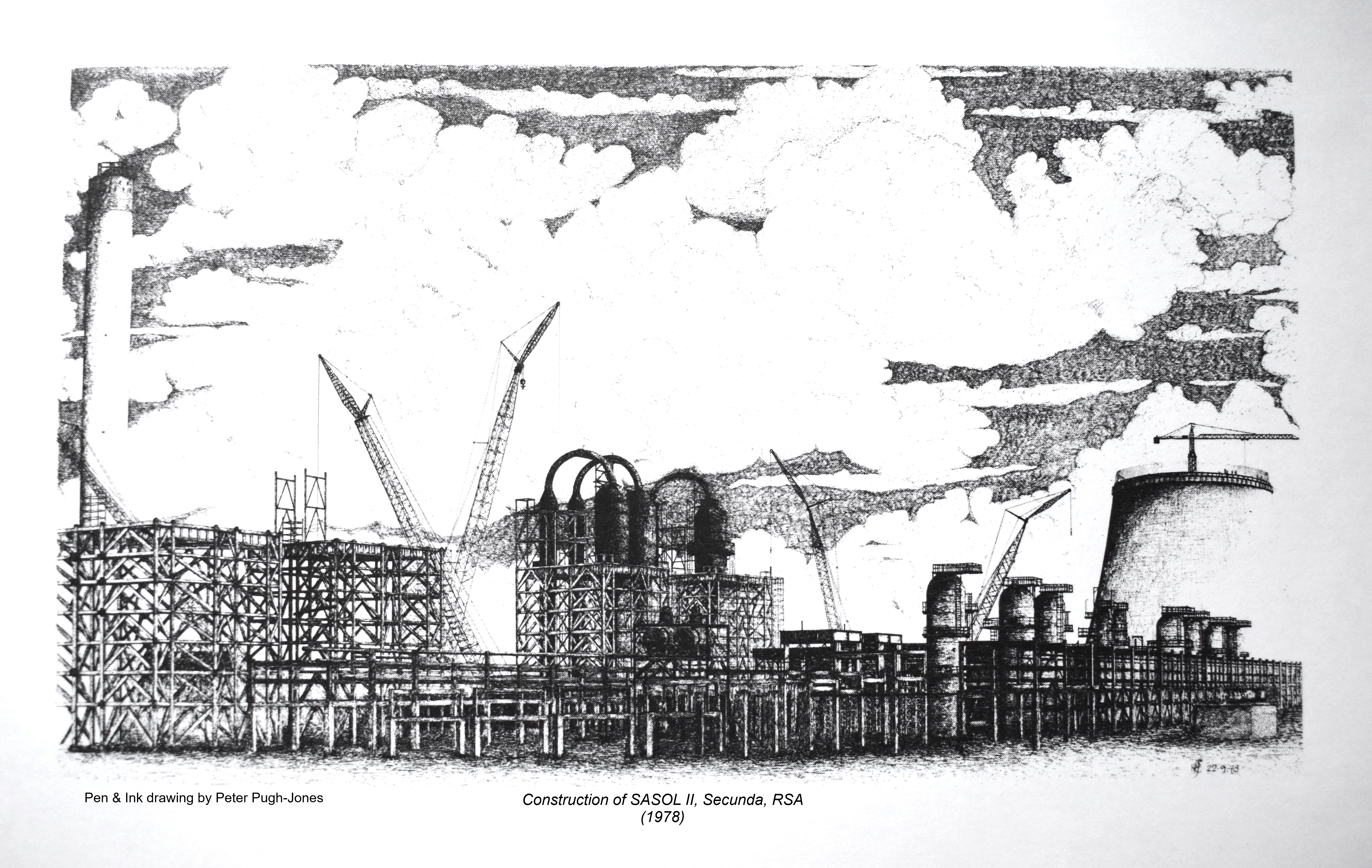
Construction of Sasol 2 (drawing by Peter Pugh-Jones, 1978)

After World War II, Anglovaal bought the rights to a method of using the Fischer–Tropsch process patented by M. W. Kellogg Limited, and in 1950, Sasol was formally incorporated as the South African Coal, Oil, and Gas Corporation (from the Afrikaans of which the present name is derived: Suid-Afrikaanse Steenkool-, Olie- en Gas Maatskappy), a state-owned company.

Commissioning of the Sasol 1 site for the production of synfuels started in 1954. Construction of the Sasol 2 site was completed in 1980, with the Sasol 3 site coming on stream in 1982. The Zevenfontein farm house served as Sasol's first offices and is still in existence today.

=== Coal mining ===
To support the required economies of scale for coal-to-liquids (CTL) process to be economical and competitive with crude oil, all stages of the operations, from coal mining to the Fischer–Tropsch process and product work up must be run with great efficiency. Due to the complexity of the Lurgi gasifers used, the quality of the coal was paramount. The initial annual output from the Sigma underground mine in Sasolburg was two million tons. Annual coal production from this mine peaked in 1991 at 7.4 million tons.

Today, most of the gasifiers in Sasolburg have been replaced with autothermal reformers that feed natural gas piped from Mozambique. Natural gas generates about 40–60% less carbon dioxide for the same energy produced as coal, thus is significantly more environmentally friendly. Gas-to-liquids technology converts natural gas, predominantly methane to liquid fuels.

Today, Sasol mines more than 40 million tons (Mt) of saleable coal a year, mostly gasification feedstock for Sasol Synfuels in Secunda. Sasol Mining also exports some 2.8 Mt of coal a year. This amounts to roughly 22% of all the coal mined in South Africa. Underground mining operations continue in the Secunda area (Bosjesspruit, Brandspruit, Middelbult, Syferfontein, and Twistdraai collieries) and Sigma: Mooikraal colliery near Sasolburg. As some of these mines are nearing the end of their useful lives, a R14bn mine replacement program has been undertaken.

The first of the new mines is the R3.4bn Thubelisha shaft, which will eventually be an operation delivering more than 8M tons/annum (mtpa) of coal over 25 years. The Impumelelo mine, which will replace the Brandspruit operation, is set for first production in 2015. It will be ramped up to produce 8.5 mtpa, and can later be upgraded to supplying some 10.5 mtpa. This coal will be used exclusively by the Sasol Synfuels plant. An underground extension of the Middelbult mine is also on the cards, with the main shaft and incline shaft being replaced by the Shondoni shaft. The first coal from the new complex was expected to be delivered in 2015.

The Secunda collieries form the world's largest underground coal operation.

In conjunction with the continuous improvement in the Fischer–Tropsch process and catalyst, significant developments were also made in mining technology. Coal mining at Sasol from the early days has been characterised by innovation. Sasol Mining mainly uses the room and pillar method of mining with a continuous miner. Sasol successfully used the longwall mining method from 1967 to 1987. Today, Sasol is one of the leaders in coal-mining technology and was the first to develop in-seam drilling from the surface using a directional drilling methodology. This has been developed into an effective exploration tool.

Working with Fifth Dimension, Sasol developed a virtual reality technology to help train continuous miner operators in a 3D environment in which various scenarios can be simulated, including sound, dust and other signs of movement. This has recently been expanded to include shuttle car, roof-bolting, and load-haul dumper simulators.

=== Fischer–Tropsch reactor technology ===
The initial reactors from Kellogg and Lurgi gasifiers were tricky and expensive to operate. The original reactor design in 1955 was a circulating fluidised bed reactor (CFBR) with a capacity of about 1,500 barrels per day. Sasol improved these reactors to eventually yield about 6,500 barrels per day. The CFBR design involves moving the whole catalyst bed around the reactor, which is energy intensive and not efficient as most of the catalyst is not in the reaction zone. Sasol then developed fixed fluidized bed (FFB) reactors in which the catalyst particles were held in a fixed reaction zone.

This resulted in a significant increase in reactor capacities. For example, the first FFB reactors commercialised in 1990 (5 m diameter) had a capacity of about 3,000 barrels per day, while the design in 2000 (10.7 m diameter) had a capacity of 20,000 barrels per day. Further advancements in reactor engineering have resulted on the development and commercialisation of Sasol Slurry Phase Distillate (SSPD) reactors which are the cornerstone of Sasol's first-of-a-kind GTL plant in Qatar.

=== From fuels to chemicals ===
The fuel price is directly linked to the oil price, so is subject to potentially large fluctuations. With Sasol only producing fuels, this meant that its profitability was largely governed by external macroeconomic forces over which it had no control. In order to become less susceptible to oil price changes, they diversified to chemicals co-produced in the Fischer–Tropsch process.

In the 1960s ammonia, styrene, and butadiene became the first chemical intermediates sold by Sasol. The ammonia was then used to make fertilizers. By 1964, Sasol was a major player in the nitrogenous fertilizer market. This product range was further extended in the 1980s to include both phosphate- and potassium-based fertilizers. Sasol now sells an extensive range of fertilizers and explosives to local and international markets, and is a world leader in its low-density ammonium nitrate technology.

With the extraction of chemicals from its Fischer–Tropsch product slate coupled with downstream functionalization and on-purpose chemical production facilities, Sasol moved from being just a South African fuels company to become an international integrated energy and chemicals company with over 200 chemical products being sold worldwide. Some of the main products produced are diesel, petrol (gasoline), naphtha, kerosene (jet fuel), liquid petroleum gas (LPG), olefins, alcohols, polymers, solvents, surfactants (detergent alcohols and oil-field chemicals), co-monomers, ammonia, methanol, various phenolics, sulphur, illuminating paraffin, bitumen, acrylates, and fuel oil.

These products are used in the production process of numerous everyday products made worldwide and benefit the lives of millions of people around the world. They include hot-melt adhesives, car products, microchip coatings, printing ink, household and industrial paints, mobile phones, circuit boards, transport fuels, compact discs, medical lasers, sun creams, perfumes and plastic bottles.

In South Africa, the chemical businesses are integrated in the Fischer–Tropsch value chain. Outside South Africa, the company operates chemical businesses based on backward integration into feedstock and/or competitive market positions for example in Europe, Asia, and the United States.

=== Recent developments ===
In May 2025, Sasol's CEO spoke about the company's plans to source more renewables and offset the use of coal feedstock. In the same year, Sasol was the world’s top producer of synthetic fuel from coal, and South Africa's -second-largest emitter of greenhouse gases. Sasol maintains a target of reducing emissions by 30% by 2030, and intends to expand its renewable energy target by around two thirds to, 2,000 megawatts in total.

== Operations ==
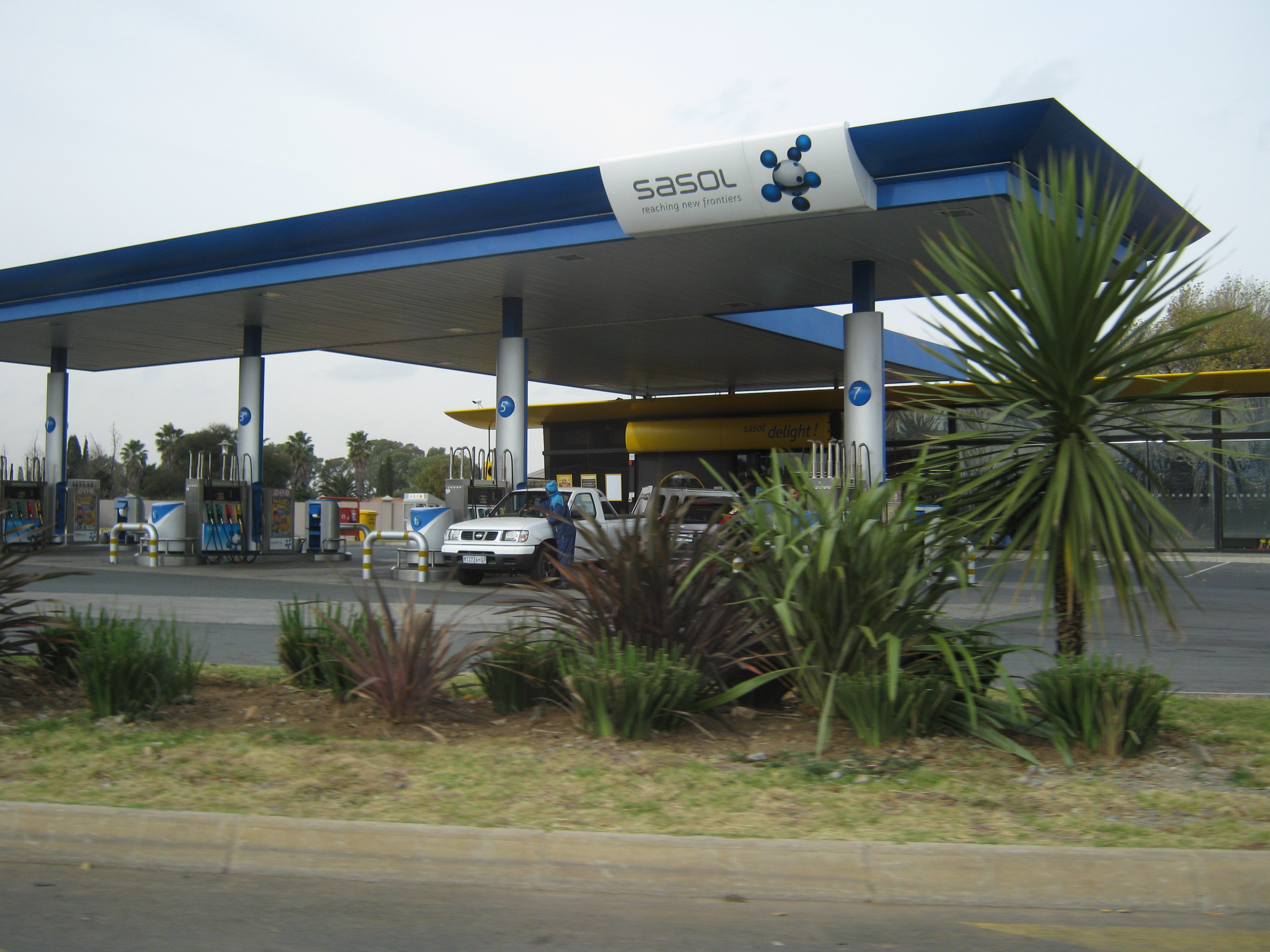
A Sasol Garage in Boksburg, close to the company's headquarters in Johannesburg, South Africa

Sasol has exploration, development, production, marketing and sales operations in 31 countries across the world, including Southern Africa, the rest of Africa, the Americas, Europe, the Middle East (West Asia), Russia, Southeast Asia, East Asia, and Oceania.

The Sasol group structure is organised into two upstream business units, three regional operating hubs and four customer-facing strategic business units.

Sasol is a member of the Fuels Industry Association of South Africa (FIASA), and was one of its founding members when the organization launched in 1994.

=== Operating business units ===
Operating Business Units comprise the mining division and exploration and production of oil and gas activities, focused on feedstock supply.

Sasol Mining operates six coal mines that supply feed-stock for Secunda (Sasol Synfuels) and Sasolburg (Sasolburg Operations) complexes in South Africa. While the coal supplied to Sasol Synfuels is mainly used as gasification feedstock, some is used to generate electricity. The coal supplied to the Sasolburg Operations is used to generate electricity and steam. Coal is also exported from the Twistdraai Export Plant to international power generation customers.

Sasol Exploration and Production International (SEPI) develops and manages the group's upstream interests in oil and gas exploration and production in Mozambique, South Africa, Canada, Gabon, and Australia.

=== Regional operating hubs ===
These include operations in Southern Africa, North America and Eurasia.

The Southern African Operations business cluster is responsible for Sasol's entire Southern Africa operations portfolio, which comprises all downstream operations and related infrastructure in the region. This combined operational portfolio has simplified and consolidated responsibilities relating to the company's operating facilities in Secunda, which are divided into a synthetic fuels and chemicals component, Sasolburg, Natref, Sasol's joint-venture inland refinery with TotalEnergies, and Satellite Operations, a consolidation of all Sasol's operating activities outside of Secunda and Sasolburg.

The International Operations business cluster is responsible for Sasol's international operations in Eurasia and North America, which include its US mega-projects in Lake Charles, Louisiana.

=== Strategic business units ===
Energy business

- Southern Africa Energy
- International Energy

The energy business manages the marketing and sales of all oil, gas and electricity products in Southern Africa, which have been consolidated under a single umbrella. In addition, this cluster oversees Sasol's international GTL (gas to liquids) ventures in Qatar, Nigeria and Uzbekistan.

Chemical business

- Base Chemicals
- Performance Chemicals

The global chemicals business includes the marketing and sales of all chemical products, both in southern Africa and internationally. The chemicals business is divided into two niche groupings; Base Chemicals, where its fertilisers, polymers and solvents products lie, and performance chemicals, comprising key products which include surfactants, surfactant intermediates, fatty alcohols, linear alkyl benzene (LAB), short-chain linear alpha olefins, ethylene, petrolatum, paraffin waxes, synthetic waxes, cresylic acids as well as high-purity and ultra-high-purity alumina and a speciality gases sub-division.

In South Africa, the chemical businesses are integrated into the Fischer–Tropsch value chain. Outside South Africa, the chemical businesses are operated based on backward integration into feedstock and/or competitive market positions.

=== Group functions ===
Group Technology manages the research and development, technology innovation and management, engineering services and capital project management portfolios. Group Technology includes Research and Technology (R&T), Engineering and Project Services and Capital Projects.

== Major projects ==
=== United States ===
Sasol has granted final approval for a US$11 billion ethane cracker and derivatives plant near Westlake and the community of Mossville, both across the Calcasieu River from Lake Charles, Louisiana, and is the largest foreign investment in the history of the State of Louisiana. It was stated "Once commissioned, this world-scale petrochemicals complex will roughly triple the company's chemical production capacity in the United States, enabling Sasol to further strengthen its position in a growing global chemicals market.

The U.S. Gulf Coast's robust infrastructure for transporting and storing abundant, low-cost ethane was a key driver in the decision to invest in America." The ethane cracker will also be supported by six chemical manufacturing plants.

By January 2015 construction was in full swing. At peak the project will create 5000 construction and 1200 permanent jobs and cost $11 billion to $14 billion.

=== Qatar ===
The Oryx GTL plant in Qatar is a joint venture between Sasol and QatarEnergy, launched in 2007. The more than 32,000 barrels per day (5,100 m^{3}/d) plant produces a combination of GTL diesel, GTL naphtha and liquid petroleum gas.

=== Uzbekistan ===
The proposed Uzbekistan GTL project is a partnership between Sasol, Uzbekneftegaz and Petronas. Sasol reconsidered its involvement in March 2016.

=== Mozambique ===
Sasol is developing a 140 MW gas-fired electricity generation plant in partnership with power utility EDM. This gas project came into operation in 2004, and is a joint venture agreement between Sasol Petroleum International, Empresa Nacional de Hidrocarbonetos (ENH), and the International Finance Corporation.

== Technology ==
=== Natref Refinery ===
Sasol is also involved in conventional oil refinery. Incorporated on 8 December 1967, construction started on the Natref refinery in 1968, and it was commissioned in Sasolburg in 1971. It was built as a joint venture between the Industrial Development Corporation (IDC), National Iranian Oil Company, and Compagnie Française des Petroles (Total) with financing by the Rembrandt Group, Volkskas, and SA Mutual.

By 1979, prior to the Iranian Revolution, the refinery was receiving 70% of its oil from Iran, with the National Iranian Oil Company owning 17.5% of the facility. Oil was piped 800 km from Durban via Richards Bay to the refinery.

The refinery is a joint venture between Sasol Ltd and Total South Africa (Pty) Ltd. Sasol has a 63.64% shareholding in Natref, and Total South Africa holds a 36.36% interest. One of few inland refineries in South Africa, Natref's capacity in 2017 stood at 108,500 barrels per day of crude oil.

The refinery uses medium gravity crude oil for bottoms upgrading and is capable of producing 70% more white product than coastal refineries that have to rely on heavy fuel oil. Some of the products produced from the refinery are diesel, petroleum, jet fuel, LPG, illuminating paraffin, bitumen, and sulfur. Natref has been certified in terms of the ISO 14001 Environmental Management System.

== Controversies ==
In 2009 Sasol agreed to pay an administrative penalty of R188 million as part of a settlement agreement with the Competition Commission of South Africa for alleged price fixing, in which a competitor alleged that Sasol was abusing its dominance in the markets for fertilisers by charging excessive prices for certain products. Sasol won an appeal on the case and will not be paying the settlement anymore.

Sasol also had to pay a €318 million fine to the European Commission (EC) in 2008, which is about R3.7 billion, for participating in a paraffin wax cartel. Despite its indication that it would appeal the fine amount, the full amount had to be paid to the EC within three months of the fine being issued.

Sasol has been levied with a R1.2bn tax provision by the Tax Court on 30 June 2017 on the back of its international crude oil purchases between 2005 and 2012. In its 2017 financial results announced on 21 August 2017, the chemical conglomerate agreed upon footing the R1.2bn tax liability. If the court's interpretation is implemented for the following two years – 2013 and 2014 – Sasol Oil's crude purchases could result in a further tax exposure of R11.6bn, thus summing up a total tax figure up to R12.8bn.

A $4 billion cost and schedule overrun at Sasol's Lake Charles project resulted in the resignation of the joint CEOs in October 2019. Adverse weather, poor subsurface conditions, and a "culture of fear" which undermined transparent reporting, were cited as contributing reasons for the over-runs.

=== Shareholder activists ===
Environmental protesters disrupted Sasol’s November 2023 annual general meeting. Old Mutual and Ninety One, two minority institutional investors, voiced concern over the company's emissions-reduction timetable.

== Greenhouse gas emissions ==
Due to the stoichiometry of hydrogen production by coal gasification and the Fischer Tropsch reaction, the production of Sasol Secunda's liquid fuels result in some of the highest specific GHG emissions in the world.

Sasol's Secunda CTL plant is, as of 2020, the world's largest point source of greenhouse gas, at 56.5 Mt/a CO_{2}, a status which persists during the 2020s, with the complex producing more carbon dioxide than the country of Portugal at the close of 2023.

Sasol is exploring alternatives such as green hydrogen which is currently being produced by the electrolysers at the Sasolburg plant. These are powered by renewable energy in the form of a 3 MW solar farm.

Air Liquide acquired 16 of Sasol's energy intensive cryogenic air separation trains in 2020 which are capable of producing 42 000 t/d of pure oxygen.

Sasol and Air Liquide plan to purchase 900 MW of renewable electricity as wind and solar power to reduce CO_{2} emissions as per their stated emissions reduction programmes: 30 per cent reduction in CO_{2} from the FY17 baseline by 2030.

Shareholders and environmentalists doubt that Sasol will meet its goals of 30 per cent fewer emissions by 2030, and net zero by 2050, which may lead to the Secunda complex being shuttered. By 2030, the company aims to lower Secunda coal volume output by 25 per cent in aid of its commitment to decarbonisation.

== See also ==
- Petroleum industry in South Africa
- List of petroleum companies
- Fischer–Tropsch process
- Coal gasification commercialization
