= EXSA =

South African renewable energy company

- Industry: Renewable Energy
- Founded: 2017; 9 years ago
- Headquarters: Paarl, South Africa
- Area served: South Africa
- Key people: Johann Rupert (Founder); Wayne Cowie (CEO); Aishah Gire (COO); Shailin Moodley (CTO)
- Products: Renewable energy Electronic trading platform
- Owner: Remgro: 75% RMB: 25%
- Parent: Ubiquity Energy (holding company)
- Website: exsa.io

EXSA (stylized as exsa, and formerly Energy Exchange of Southern Africa) is a South African renewable energy trading company. It provides corporate clients with grid-connected, wheeled energy, sourced from various independent power producers.

Founded in 2017 and headquartered in Paarl, in the Western Cape, EXSA is co-owned by major South African investment holding company Remgro, via its Ubiquity Energy subsidiary, and South African corporate and investment bank RMB.

== History ==
EXSA was founded in 2017 by Johann Rupert, via South African investment holding company Remgro. The company was initially called the Energy Exchange of Southern Africa.

Before the company's foundation, parent company Remgro already had a history of investing in the energy sector. By investing in companies specializing in photovoltaic technologies and installations, Remgro provided onsite backup power to companies it owns, such as Mediclinic Group, Distell, and RCL Foods.

Remgro, via subsidiary Ubiquity Energy, also owned a 51% stake in Enerweb, a company that provides the platform that runs the Southern African Power Pool (SAPP), which enables daily electricity trading between Southern African Development Community (SADC) countries. This shareholding gave Remgro even more experience in the energy sector, upon which to build.

Remgro then realized that with large and unpredictably-timed price hikes for power from the traditionally monopolistic South African energy producer Eskom, there was an opportunity to create more price certainty within the energy sector.

This, coupled with strong demand for stable power supply and pricing from companies outside the Remgro stable, led the company to develop an energy electronic trading platform to bring together green energy producers and electricity consumers, which later became EXSA. The main goal for EXSA was to enable energy consumers to get access to a diverse supply of reliable, cost-effective, renewable energy.

At the start, EXSA focused on wheeling renewable energy to other Remgro companies, thereby reducing EXSA's credit risk, while also enabling companies in the Remgro portfolio to reach net zero targets in an expedited way. Thereafter, EXSA signed power purchasing agreements with various third parties, to bolster its customer pipeline.

In 2021, Mediclinic Group announced it had signed an agreement to procure renewable energy via EXSA for approximately R2.64 billion.

In 2022, the National Energy Regulator of South Africa (NERSA) granted EXSA a license to trade electricity via the Eskom national grid.

Also in 2022, renewable power utility Earth & Wire signed a 12-year power purchase agreement with EXSA for 5MW (13 GWh/y) of solar energy. The power would be generated from the Slimsun Too photovoltaic project, near Malmesbury, in the Western Cape, and delivered to customers using Eskom’s national grid.

EXSA began trading in the energy sector in 2023. In the same year, it was reported that the company had a pipeline of over 100MW of electricity, which would be delivered over the next 1 to 2 years. EXSA also stated that it intended to include battery storage solutions to its trading platform.

Also in 2023, Rand Merchant Bank (RMB) announced that it had acquired a 25% shareholding in EXSA's parent company, Ubiquity Energy, from parent company Remgro, for an undisclosed amount.

In May 2025, it was confirmed that EXSA had secured contracts to provide wheeled renewable power to South African companies including Woolworths, Wispeco, Siqalo Foods, Old Mutual, and Delaire Graaf.

In August 2025, EXSA and Seriti Green finalized an agreement for the 155 MW Ummbila Emoyeni wind energy project in Mpumalanga. With a 15-year power purchase agreement, EXSA will procure all of the project's power, for distribution to its portfolio of large corporate and industrial customers.

The R5 billion project will generate approximately 525 GWh of clean energy per year, and has a target date of October 2027 for commercial operation. Construction will include 25 wind turbines, fitted with the largest blades currently in use in South Africa. The 155 MW project is the first phase of the 900 MW Ummbila Emoyeni hybrid complex, which will also comprise solar and battery storage components.

In October 2025, EXSA partnered with Sustainable Power Solutions (SPS) to build a 5.6 MW solar farm in Malmesbury, in the Western Cape province of South Africa. The 10-acre, R87 million independent power producer is set to generate 12 million kilowatt-hours of clean energy annually - enough to power 5,000 households. The project will launch with commercial and industrial clients.

== Operations ==
EXSA is licensed as an energy trader by the National Energy Regulator of South Africa (NERSA), the regulatory authority for the electricity supply industry in South Africa.

The company operates a renewable energy electronic trading platform, through which third parties can purchase green energy for their operations, without rigid contracts or minimum energy requirements. EXSA's goal is to provide South African companies with stable, fairly-priced renewable power solutions, including wind, solar, biomass and hydropower. On a blended basis, EXSA aims to enable companies to match their energy needs more accurately, as opposed to just relying on a single source.

EXSA buys renewable energy in bulk, under long-term contracts with power generators, and resells that energy under bespoke arrangements that best suits each of its customer’s specific needs.

EXSA consumers can purchase some of their power from EXSA, and the rest from elsewhere, if they so desire. They are charged for the energy they consume at the agreed rate. EXSA also provides its customers with energy redundancy. If a single power plant has a temporary reduction in load, the exchange can sell a consumer power from a different plant, so as to mitigate or entirely avoid downside price risk. EXSA has an arrangement with Eskom at an aggregated level to ensure clients do not have to pay for surplus energy.

The company sources energy from a diverse network of independent power producers (IPPs) across South Africa. It then uses analytics protocols, multivariate optimization, and portfolio-level design tools to ensure that energy supply is tailored to a customer’s specific needs and goals.

EXSA provides power via a process called wheeling, which is he transmission of power from one system to another through a third-party interconnecting network. The wheeling provider (utility) receives compensation for the service and for electricity losses incurred during transmission. As an economic concept, wheeling combines the traits of opposing designs of the electricity market; as a regulated public utility, and as a competitive market. This delivery may also happen across multiple different distribution networks, such as through Eskom, to a municipality.

EXSA intends to bring solar energy into its trading mix in 2025, followed by wind power in 2027. With more active power generation and more companies participating, the company expects a truly competitive energy market to emerge in South Africa in 2028.

== Ownership ==
EXSA has two shareholders. As of May 2025, they are:

- Rand Merchant Bank (RMB): 25%
- Remgro: 75%

EXSA's board comprises three members from Remgro and two from RMB.

== See also ==
- Renewable energy in South Africa
- Energy in South Africa
- Climate change in South Africa
- Integrated Resource Plan
- Renewable Energy Independent Power Producer Procurement Programme
- Feed-in tariff
- List of power stations in South Africa
