= Battery Energy Storage Independent Power Producer Procurement Programme =

South African government programme

- Abbreviation: BESIPPPP
- Formation: 7 March 2023; 3 years ago
- Type: Public procurement programme
- Legal status: Active
- Headquarters: Centurion, Pretoria
- Region served: South Africa
- Key people: Gwede Mantashe; Kgosientsho Ramokgopa
- Parent organization: Department of Electricity and Energy (formerly the Department of Mineral Resources and Energy); administered by the Independent Power Producer Office
- Website: ipp-storage.co.za

The Battery Energy Storage Independent Power Producer Procurement Programme (BESIPPPP, sometimes written BESIPPP or ESIPPPP) is a competitive tender programme run by the South African government to procure utility-scale battery energy storage capacity from private independent power producers (IPPs). Launched in March 2023 by the Department of Mineral Resources and Energy (DMRE) and administered by the Independent Power Producer Office (IPP Office), it was the first grid-scale energy storage procurement programme in South Africa.

Under the programme, bidders compete to build, own and operate battery energy storage systems (BESS) at specified Eskom transmission substations, and are paid over 15-year agreements for making capacity available to the National Transmission Company of South Africa (NTCSA), which dispatches the batteries to provide ancillary services and to relieve grid constraints. Across three bid windows held between 2023 and 2025 the programme awarded preferred bidder status to 18 projects totalling approximately 1,744 MW/6,976 MWh of four-hour storage.

The programme is one of several public procurement programmes run by the IPP Office alongside the Renewable Energy Independent Power Producer Procurement Programme (REIPPPP), the Risk Mitigation Independent Power Producer Procurement Programme (RMIPPPP) and a gas programme, and forms part of the government's response to the South African energy crisis.

== Background ==
South Africa's Integrated Resource Plan 2019 (IRP 2019) identified a need for new energy storage capacity to support the growing share of variable renewable generation on the national grid and to address a persistent electricity supply shortfall that had resulted in recurrent load shedding since 2007. In September 2020 the National Energy Regulator of South Africa (NERSA) concurred with a Section 34 ministerial determination under the Electricity Regulation Act, 2006, to procure 11,813 MW of new capacity from a range of technologies, including 513 MW of battery storage. A subsequent determination provided for a further 1,231 MW of storage to be procured in two additional rounds of 615 MW and 616 MW.

The programme was designed to complement the RMIPPPP, launched in 2020, which had procured dispatchable hybrid projects combining renewable generation with storage, and Eskom's own battery storage programme funded by development finance institutions. Unlike those programmes, BESIPPPP procures standalone, grid-connected batteries sited at pre-selected Eskom substations, chosen by the utility for their ability to relieve local network constraints and free up grid capacity for new generation.

== Programme design ==
BESIPPPP follows the two-stage qualification and evaluation model used in South Africa's earlier IPP programmes. In the first stage bids must meet minimum legal, financial and technical qualification criteria, including demonstration of project readiness; in the second stage compliant bids are ranked on a 90/10 split between price (90 points) and economic development commitments (10 points), in line with the Preferential Procurement Policy Framework Act. The IPP Office may also conduct a value-for-money benchmarking exercise against comparable international prices and invite bidders to submit a "best and final offer" before preferred bidders are appointed. Each bid window is "site-specific": a fixed number of substations is offered and only one preferred bidder is appointed per site.

Key technical requirements published for the third bid window, which were broadly consistent across the programme, included:

- Battery storage technology with a minimum duration of four hours at the contracted capacity
- A minimum round-trip efficiency of 70%, tested annually
- A maximum of 730 equivalent full cycles per contract year
- Minimum availability of 95% over 8,760 hours per contract year, enforced through a penalty regime
- Provision of instantaneous, regulating, ten-minute and supplemental reserves to the system operator, which determines charging, discharging and steady-state operating modes

Projects are contracted under power purchase agreements of up to 15 years. The buyer was initially designated as Eskom Holdings and, following the unbundling of Eskom's transmission business, became the NTCSA. Winning projects receive a capacity payment for net dependable capacity made available and an energy payment for energy delivered, rather than trading energy on their own account. The 70% round-trip efficiency threshold, lower than that typically achieved by lithium-ion batteries, prompted industry discussion at launch as to whether flow batteries might compete, although all projects awarded to date have used lithium-ion chemistries.

== Bid windows ==
=== Bid Window 1 ===
The first request for proposals was released on 7 March 2023, calling for up to 513 MW (at least 2,052 MWh) of storage at five substations in the Northern Cape and North West supply areas. Seventeen bids were received on 2 August 2023. On 30 November 2023 the Minister of Mineral Resources and Energy, Gwede Mantashe, announced four preferred bidders – three projects (Oasis Aggeneis, Oasis Mookodi and Oasis Nieuwehoop) bid by a consortium led by EDF Renewables with the South African developer Mulilo as co-sponsor, and the Mogobe BESS bid by the Norwegian company Scatec – and indicated that value-for-money negotiations would follow for the fifth site. Although economic development commitments were not mandatory in the first round, the appointed bidders committed to 992 job-years and more than R3.2 billion in local content. In April 2024 the department appointed AGV Projects, a vehicle of the IPP Globeleq, as the fifth preferred bidder with the 153 MW/612 MWh Red Sands BESS at the Garona substation, at a reported total cost of R6.43 billion.

BESIPPPP Bid Window 1 preferred bidders
Project	Developer / sponsors	Substation	Province	Capacity	Milestones	Ref
Oasis Aggeneis	EDF Renewables, Mulilo, Pele Energy Group, Gibb-Crede	Aggeneis	Northern Cape	77 MW / 308 MWh	Commercial close Nov 2024; financial close Nov 2024	
Oasis Mookodi	EDF Renewables, Mulilo, Pele Energy Group, Gibb-Crede, community trust	Mookodi	North West	77 MW / 308 MWh	Commercial close Oct 2024; financial close Nov 2024	
Oasis Nieuwehoop	EDF Renewables, Mulilo, Pele Energy Group, Gibb-Crede	Nieuwehoop	Northern Cape	103 MW / 412 MWh	Commercial close Nov 2024; financial close Nov 2024	
Mogobe BESS	Scatec, Perpetua Holdings, community trust	Ferrum	Northern Cape	103 MW / 412 MWh	Commercial close Oct 2024; financial close Oct 2024	
Red Sands BESS	Globeleq (AGV Projects), African Rainbow Energy	Garona	Northern Cape	153 MW / 612 MWh	Preferred bidder Apr 2024; commercial and financial close Jun 2025	

Mogobe and Oasis Mookodi became the first standalone, private-sector grid-scale batteries procured in South Africa to reach commercial close, at a signing ceremony in Cape Town on 16 October 2024 attended by the Minister of Electricity and Energy, Kgosientsho Ramokgopa; the two projects had a combined investment value of R5.3 billion and commercial operation was targeted for September 2026. The remaining two EDF-led projects reached financial close in November 2024. Red Sands, described as the largest standalone battery in Africa to reach financial close, closed in June 2025 with senior debt from Standard Bank and other lenders.

=== Bid Window 2 ===
The second request for proposals was released on 14 December 2023, alongside REIPPPP Bid Window 7, for up to 615 MW/2,460 MWh at eight substations – Mercury, Carmel, Hermes, Ngwedi, Midas, Marang, Bighorn and Ararat – in the North West, Gauteng and Free State supply areas, with each site sized at approximately 77 MW with four hours of storage. The bid submission date was extended from 30 April 2024 to 6 June 2024 and ultimately to August 2024 to allow time for Eskom to process cost-estimate-letter applications; 31 bids were received on 29 August 2024.

On 23 December 2024 Ramokgopa announced eight preferred bidders with a combined investment value of R12.8 billion. Mulilo was awarded five projects, EDF Renewables one and the Emirati developer AMEA Power two. The department reported a 35% decrease in average evaluation prices compared with the first window, which it attributed to greater competition, and the projects committed to 41% black shareholding and approximately 1,570 job opportunities.

BESIPPPP Bid Window 2 preferred bidders
Project	Developer	Province	Capacity	Milestones	Ref
Oasis Ararat BESS	EDF Renewables	North West	77 MW	Preferred bidder Dec 2024	
Rooikoppies BESS	Mulilo	North West	77 MW / 304 MWh	Preferred bidder Dec 2024	
Mulilo Mercury BESS	Mulilo	Free State	76 MW / 304 MWh	Commercial close Apr 2026; financial close Apr 2026	
Welverdiend BESS	Mulilo	Gauteng	77 MW / 304 MWh	Preferred bidder Dec 2024	
Hartebeesfontein BESS	Mulilo	North West	77 MW / 308 MWh	Financial close Jun 2026	
Leeuwpoort BESS	Mulilo	Gauteng	77 MW / 304 MWh	Preferred bidder Dec 2024	
Gainfar BESS	AMEA Power	Free State	77 MW	Preferred bidder Dec 2024	
Boitekong BESS	AMEA Power	Free State	77 MW	Preferred bidder Dec 2024	

Mulilo Mercury, near Viljoenskroon, became the first Bid Window 2 project to reach financial close in April 2026, at a reported cost of R1.4 billion using lithium iron phosphate technology; Hartebeesfontein, near Klerksdorp at the Hermes substation, followed in June 2026 with debt from Absa, Standard Bank and Nedbank.

=== Bid Window 3 ===
The third request for proposals was released on 28 March 2024 for up to 616 MW/2,464 MWh at five substations in the Free State – Harvard, Leander, Theseus, Everest and Merapi – with each project sized between 123 MW and 124 MW. Bids, originally due on 31 July 2024, were received on 28 November 2024; the IPP Office published a list of 33 bids from 28 companies, including TotalEnergies and Globeleq.

On 30 May 2025 Ramokgopa announced five preferred bidders representing R9.5 billion of investment: Mulilo for four sites (Bloemhoek at Theseus, Erfdeel at Everest, Vanilla at Harvard and Retreat at Merapi, together 493 MW/1,972 MWh) and Scatec for the Haru BESS at Leander (123 MW/492 MWh). The department stated that the round was highly competitive and that average evaluation prices were 40% and 8% lower than in the first and second windows respectively. Commercial close was expected in early 2026 and commercial operation by January 2028.

BESIPPPP Bid Window 3 preferred bidders
Project	Developer	Substation	Capacity	Evaluation price (R/MWh)	Ref
Bloemhoek BESS	Mulilo	Theseus	124 MW / 496 MWh	1,801.24	
Haru BESS	Scatec, Stanlib Greenstreet and Redstreet Funds, community trust	Leander	123 MW / 492 MWh	2,037.10	
Erfdeel BESS	Mulilo	Everest	123 MW / 492 MWh	2,157.29	
Vanilla BESS	Mulilo	Harvard	123 MW / 492 MWh	2,169.80	
Retreat BESS	Mulilo	Merapi	123 MW / 492 MWh	2,477.86	

Scatec stated that the Haru project would cost approximately R2.2 billion, financed 90% with non-recourse project debt, with Scatec holding 50.01% of the equity, Stanlib funds 44.99% and a community trust 5%.

== Outcomes ==
By mid-2025 the three completed bid windows had procured approximately 1,744 MW/6,976 MWh of battery storage – 513 MW, 615 MW and 616 MW respectively – all with four-hour duration and required to be operational by 2027–2028. Mulilo, majority owned by the Danish fund manager Copenhagen Infrastructure Partners, participated in 12 of the 18 awarded projects and led nine of them, giving it about 65% of contracted capacity by its own account; EDF Renewables, Scatec, Globeleq and AMEA Power accounted for the remainder. Following the third window Ramokgopa indicated that future bid windows would incorporate grid-forming technology requirements to support a higher share of renewable generation.

The programme has also been credited with establishing the NTCSA as a bankable contracting counterparty following the legal separation of Eskom's transmission business, with commercial banks including Standard Bank, Absa, Nedbank and Investec providing project debt to the awarded projects.

== Reception and criticism ==
Industry observers welcomed the programme as the first of its kind in South Africa but criticised repeated extensions of bid submission deadlines, which delayed the second and third windows by several months against the original timetable. The pace of moving from preferred bidder announcement to financial close has also been slow relative to the six months envisaged in the request for proposals; the first-window projects announced in November 2023 took between 11 and 19 months to close.

Following the third-window announcement in May 2025, the opposition party uMkhonto weSizwe alleged that the awards indicated pre-arranged deals and "foreign capture" of South Africa's energy infrastructure, pointing to the concentration of awards with a small number of foreign-owned developers. The Ministry of Electricity and Energy issued a statement on 3 June 2025 rejecting the allegations and stating that the round had been conducted by an independent bid evaluation committee under the established procurement framework. The minister also highlighted the black economic empowerment outcomes of the round.

== See also ==
- Renewable Energy Independent Power Producer Procurement Programme
- Energy in South Africa
- South African energy crisis
- Eskom
- National Transmission Company of South Africa
- Grid energy storage
