= NOA Group =

South African independent power producer

- Type: Private
- Industry: Energy; Renewable energy
- Founded: 2022; 4 years ago
- Area served: South Africa
- Key people: Karel Cornelissen (CEO)
- Products: Electricity
- Services: Wheeled energy trading
- Website: noagroup.africa

NOA, officially NOA Group, is a South African renewable energy company, wheeled energy trader, and independent power producer (IPP).

The company is headquartered in Cape Town, and has a pipeline of 1,500MW of renewable energy generation capacity in development. NOA develops renewable energy facilities of its own, and acts as an off-taker for projects it doesn't own.

== History ==
NOA was founded in 2022. In November of that year, the company received an initial equity investment of R1.6 billion form African Infrastructure Investment Managers (AIIM), a subsidiary of Old Mutual Alternative Investments. Its main aim was delivering net-zero energy solutions for Africa, in both the commercial and industrial sector.

In September 2023, it was reported that NOA had signed a renewable energy supply agreement with major South African private healthcare provider Netcare, as part of the latter's effort to reduce its carbon footprint. Netcare's CEO Richard Friedland said the agreement was a major milestone in the company's environmental sustainability strategy, through which it committed to procuring 100% of its purchased energy from renewable sources by 2030. Phase 1 of the agreement involved NOA providing six Netcare facilities with power from a mix of wind and solar farms. This would constitute up to 11% of Netcare's total power usage.

That same month, AIIM announced that it was doubling its investment in NOA, for a total of R3.2 billion, to fast-track renewable energy in South Africa. AIIM Investment Director Ed Stumpf said the investment firm had seen strong traction since the launch of NOA, and that the additional funding was driven by increased client demand and the desire to build renewable solutions faster. He said the funding would be sourced from a combination of equity provided by AIIM's South African IDEAS Fund, and its pan-African investment fund, AIIF4.

In January 2025, NOA's energy trading license was approved by the National Energy Regulator of South Africa (NERSA).

In March 2025, NOA spoke with South African publication Engineering News about its upcoming projects and existing supply agreements. NOA said that since the granting of its energy trading license, it had signed energy supply agreements ranging from one to 10 years, with a total supplied capacity of 1,300 GWh per year. Agreements had been signed with seven companies, including Old Mutual Properties, Netcare, Manganese Mining Company (MMC), and Tronox.

In December 2025, NOA purchased the Stellar Project (Stellar Energy Solutions), a 150MW construction-ready solar PV project in Limpopo, from DRDGold, for R147 million.

== Operations ==
The company aggregates renewable energy from wind, solar PV, and battery energy generation facilities across South Africa.

As of mid-2026, NOA's projects include:

- Eland, a solar PV facility with a capacity of 10MW, located in the Free State
- Khauta South, a solar PV facility with a capacity of 349MW, located in the Free State
- Khauta West, a solar PV facility with a capacity of 157MW, located in the Free State
- Stellar Project, a solar PV facility with a capacity of 150MW, located in Limpopo
- Wind Garden, a wind power facility with a capacity of 94MW, located in the Eastern Cape

== See also ==
- Renewable energy in South Africa
- Electricity sector in South Africa
- Plug-in electric vehicles in South Africa
