= Mulilo =

South African renewable energy developer and independent power producer

Mulilo Energy Holdings
- Type: Private
- Industry: Renewable energy, independent power production
- Founded: 2008; 18 years ago
- Founders: Johnny Cullum; Chris Aberdein
- Headquarters: Cape Town, South Africa
- Area served: South Africa
- Key people: Jan Oberholzer (Chairman); Jan Fourie (CEO)
- Products: Onshore wind, solar PV, battery energy storage
- Owners: Copenhagen Infrastructure Partners (majority, via CI New Markets Fund I); Norfund (minority); Founders and management
- Website: mulilo.com

Mulilo Energy Holdings, commonly known as Mulilo, is a South African renewable energy developer and independent power producer (IPP) headquartered in Cape Town. Founded in 2008, the company develops, finances, builds, owns and operates onshore wind, solar photovoltaic (PV) and battery energy storage system (BESS) projects. Mulilo has participated in South Africa's public procurement programmes for renewable energy since the first bidding round of the Renewable Energy Independent Power Producer Procurement Programme (REIPPPP) and has also developed projects for private and corporate off-takers.

Since March 2023 the company has been majority owned by the Danish fund manager Copenhagen Infrastructure Partners (CIP), which acquired its stake through the Copenhagen Infrastructure New Markets Fund I (CI NMF I). The Norwegian development finance institution Norfund became a minority shareholder in November 2025. As of 2025–2026 the company reported approximately 448 MW of operational wind and solar capacity, more than 2 GW of projects in operation or under construction, and a long-term development pipeline exceeding 30 GW.

Mulilo has been the largest single winner of capacity in South Africa's Battery Energy Storage Independent Power Producer Procurement Programme (BESIPPPP): by mid-2025 it had participated in 12 of the 18 projects awarded across the programme's first three bid windows and taken a lead role in nine of them.

== History ==
=== Founding and early REIPPPP rounds (2008–2016) ===
Mulilo was founded in 2008 by Johnny Cullum and Chris Aberdein. Cullum, who had previously built the construction company CSV Construction, was chief executive from the company's inception, while Aberdein was chairman.

The company was an early participant in the REIPPPP, the competitive tender programme launched by the Department of Energy in 2011. Mulilo partnered two solar PV projects in the first bid window – Mulilo Renewable Energy Solar PV Prieska and Mulilo Renewable Energy Solar PV De Aar, both in the Northern Cape – which were completed and feeding electricity into the national grid by early 2015.

In the third REIPPPP bid window Mulilo, together with partners, secured four further Northern Cape projects with a combined capacity of 385 MW and a reported combined value of R8.8 billion. These comprised two 75 MW solar PV plants near Prieska – the Mulilo Prieska PV project, developed with Total, Calulo Renewable Energy, the Industrial Development Corporation, Futuregrowth Asset Management and a community trust, and the Mulilo Sonnedix Prieska project, developed with Sonnedix – and two wind farms of 139 MW and 96 MW north and south-west of De Aar, constructed by Longyuan Engineering South Africa. All four reached financial close in late 2014 and early 2015. The Prieska solar plant and the De Aar wind farms entered commercial operation in 2016.

=== Corporate power purchase agreements (2023–2024) ===
As South Africa liberalised its electricity market and large corporates began procuring renewable power directly, Mulilo moved into the private off-take segment. In February 2023, Sasol and Air Liquide signed two power purchase agreements (PPAs) with TotalEnergies and its partner Mulilo for the long-term supply of 260 MW of renewable electricity to Sasol's Secunda complex, where Air Liquide operates the world's largest oxygen production site. The agreements covered a 140 MW wind farm (Mulilo De Aar 2 South) and a 120 MW solar PV plant (Paarde Valley PV2), both near De Aar.

The consortium – owned 33.5% by TotalEnergies, 15.5% by Mulilo and 51% by the Reatile Group – reached financial close and started construction in November 2024 at a reported cost of R7.5 billion, with electricity to be wheeled through the national grid over a 20-year term. The projects connect to the Kestrel Main Transmission Substation, developed by Mulilo and TotalEnergies under a self-build agreement and to be handed over to Eskom on completion. Debt was provided by Standard Bank, Absa and Nedbank.

Separately, the Mulilo Total Hydra Storage project – a 75 MW hybrid solar-plus-storage facility at De Aar bid by a TotalEnergies-led consortium under the Risk Mitigation Independent Power Producer Procurement Programme (RMIPPPP) – reached financial close in December 2023.

=== Acquisition by Copenhagen Infrastructure Partners (2023) ===
On 9 March 2023, Copenhagen Infrastructure Partners announced that it had acquired a majority shareholding in Mulilo Energy Holdings through CI NMF I, with the founders and existing management retaining minority stakes and remaining in the business. Financial terms were not disclosed. At the time of the transaction Mulilo reported an approximately 8% share of the South African renewable energy market, 440 MW of operating wind and solar capacity, and a development pipeline exceeding 25 GW. The deal was CI NMF I's first investment in South Africa and its first platform investment, and was subject to approval by the Competition Commission. Completion followed in July 2023. The technology news website MyBroadband later reported that CIP had acquired an 87% stake for more than US$200 million.

=== Leadership transition (2023–2024) ===
In September 2023 Mulilo appointed Jan Oberholzer, the former chief operating officer of Eskom, as chairman and non-executive director, succeeding co-founder Chris Aberdein. In January 2024 the company announced that Jan Fourie, previously executive vice-president for renewable energy at the Norwegian developer Scatec, would succeed Johnny Cullum as chief executive. Cullum stepped down in May 2024 but remained a board member and shareholder. Fourie, an electrical engineer with an MBA and 17 years' experience in the African power sector, took office on 1 May 2024.

=== Expansion (2024–2026) ===
Following the CIP acquisition, Mulilo set a target of bringing 5 GW of renewable energy and storage projects into construction and operation by 2028. Over the twelve months to March 2025 the company closed some 660 MW of new projects, adding to an operational portfolio of about 420 MW.

In March 2025, Mulilo and H1 Capital reached financial close on the 75 MW Du Plessis Dam Solar PV2 facility near De Aar, which supplies about 248 GWh a year to the licensed energy trader Etana Energy under an "aggregator" model in which a trader sells wheeled renewable electricity to multiple end customers. It was described as the first project to use Etana's guarantee facilities, including a R1 billion payment guarantee facility with Standard Bank and a preference-share investment from Norfund and Standard Bank. The plant is one of four Mulilo facilities connected to the Kestrel Main Transmission Substation.

In September 2025, Standard Bank agreed a corporate "Equity HoldCo Facility" for Mulilo with an initial commitment of R1.1 billion and headroom for a further R5.9 billion, for a total potential commitment of R7 billion (approximately US$400 million). Unlike project-specific finance, the facility was structured to fund equity commitments and guarantees across the company's pipeline of REIPPPP, BESS and private off-take projects.

In November 2025, Norfund announced a US$75 million (over R1 billion) investment in Mulilo through its Climate Investment Fund, becoming a strategic minority shareholder alongside CIP. At the time the company reported 765 MW under construction, a target of adding roughly 1 GW to its construction portfolio in 2026, and an ambition to bring 5.5 GW of its near-term pipeline to financial close by the end of 2027. Standard Chartered advised Norfund on the transaction.

During the first half of 2026 Mulilo reached financial close on five projects: the Orkney solar PV project in North West; the 76 MW/304 MWh Mulilo Mercury BESS near Viljoenskroon in the Free State; the 337 MW_{DC} Middlepunt solar PV plant near Welkom; the 380 MW_{DC} Beaufort West solar PV facility in the Western Cape; and the 77 MW/308 MWh Hartebeesfontein BESS near Klerksdorp. With the Beaufort West close in April 2026 the company stated that it had exceeded its target of deploying 1 GW of new projects a year and that its combined operational and under-construction portfolio exceeded 2 GW. At the South Africa Investment Conference 2026 the company announced an investment commitment of nearly R15 billion to fund three large-scale solar PV projects and a BESS totalling 716 MW of export capacity.

== Battery energy storage ==
Mulilo has been the most successful bidder in South Africa's BESIPPPP, the government programme launched in 2023 to procure grid-connected battery storage at Eskom substations under 15-year agreements providing capacity, energy and ancillary services.

- Bid Window 1 (2023–2024): In November 2023 the Department of Mineral Resources and Energy named the Oasis consortium – led by EDF Renewables with Mulilo as co-sponsor and Pele Energy Group and Gibb-Crede as equity partners – preferred bidder for three of the five projects awarded: Oasis Aggeneis, Oasis Mookodi and Oasis Nieuwehoop, together 257 MW/1,028 MWh, at an estimated cost of more than R7 billion. All three reached financial close in November 2024, with commissioning expected within 24 months.
- Bid Window 2 (2024–2026): In December 2024 the Department of Electricity and Energy announced eight preferred bidders for 615 MW/2,460 MWh of storage at substations in the North West supply area, each project sized at approximately 77 MW with four hours of storage. Mulilo secured five of the eight projects, including Mulilo Mercury, Hartebeesfontein, Welverdiend and Leeuwpoort. Mulilo Mercury (76 MW/304 MWh, R1.4 billion, lithium iron phosphate technology) became the first Bid Window 2 project to reach financial close, in April 2026, and Hartebeesfontein followed in June 2026 with debt from Absa, Standard Bank and Nedbank and the Reatile Group as empowerment partner.
- Bid Window 3 (2024–2025): In May 2025 the Minister of Electricity and Energy, Kgosientsho Ramokgopa, named Mulilo preferred bidder for four of the five Free State sites tendered – Bloemhoek (124 MW, Theseus substation), Erfdeel (123 MW, Everest), Vanilla (123 MW, Harvard) and Retreat (123 MW, Merapi) – totalling 493 MW/1,972 MWh, with Scatec winning the fifth. Bids in the round were 40% lower on average than in the first window.

According to the company, its participation across the three windows amounted to 1,134 MW/4,536 MWh, or about 65% of all capacity procured under BESIPPPP to that point.

== Projects ==
The following table summarises Mulilo's principal utility-scale projects as reported in public sources. Capacities are as stated in the cited sources; solar PV projects are shown in MW_{DC} where indicated.

Project	Technology	Capacity	Province	Programme / off-taker	Partners	Status	Ref
Mulilo Renewable Energy Solar PV Prieska	Solar PV	–	Northern Cape	REIPPPP Bid Window 1	–	Operational (2014)	
Mulilo Renewable Energy Solar PV De Aar	Solar PV	–	Northern Cape	REIPPPP Bid Window 1	–	Operational (2014)	
Mulilo Prieska PV (Prieska–Total)	Solar PV	75 MW	Northern Cape	REIPPPP Bid Window 3	Total, Calulo, IDC, Futuregrowth	Operational (2016)	
Mulilo Sonnedix Prieska	Solar PV	75 MW	Northern Cape	REIPPPP Bid Window 3	Sonnedix, Ixowave	Operational (2016)	
Longyuan Mulilo De Aar wind farms (2)	Onshore wind	139 MW and 96 MW	Northern Cape	REIPPPP Bid Window 3	Longyuan	Operational (2016)	
Mulilo De Aar 2 South Wind Farm	Onshore wind	140 MW	Northern Cape	Private PPA – Sasol / Air Liquide	TotalEnergies, Reatile	Under construction (FC Nov 2024)	
Paarde Valley PV2	Solar PV	120 MW	Northern Cape	Private PPA – Sasol / Air Liquide	TotalEnergies, Reatile	Under construction (FC Nov 2024)	
Oasis Aggeneis, Mookodi and Nieuwehoop BESS (3)	BESS	257 MW / 1,028 MWh (combined)	Northern Cape, North West	BESIPPPP Bid Window 1	EDF Renewables (lead), Pele, Gibb-Crede	Under construction (FC Nov 2024)	
Du Plessis Dam Solar PV2	Solar PV	75 MW	Northern Cape	Private PPA – Etana Energy	H1 Capital	Under construction (FC Mar 2025)	
Orkney Solar PV	Solar PV	–	North West	–	–	Under construction (FC 2026)	
Mulilo Mercury BESS	BESS	76 MW / 304 MWh	Free State	BESIPPPP Bid Window 2	–	Under construction (FC Apr 2026)	
Middlepunt Solar PV	Solar PV	337 MW_{DC} / 240 MW_{AC}	Free State	REIPPPP Bid Window 7 (NTCSA)	Reatile, Perpetua	Under construction (FC Apr 2026)	
Beaufort West Solar PV	Solar PV	380 MW_{DC} / 250 MW_{AC}	Western Cape	Private PPA – NOA	–	Under construction (FC Apr 2026)	
Hartebeesfontein BESS	BESS	77 MW / 308 MWh	North West	BESIPPPP Bid Window 2 (NTCSA)	Reatile	Under construction (FC Jun 2026)	
Bloemhoek, Erfdeel, Vanilla and Retreat BESS (4)	BESS	493 MW / 1,972 MWh (combined)	Free State	BESIPPPP Bid Window 3	–	Preferred bidder (May 2025)	

=== Middlepunt Solar PV ===
The Middlepunt project near Welkom was the single project awarded to Mulilo in REIPPPP Bid Window 7, announced in January 2025, in which eight preferred bidders were named for 1,760 MW of capacity. In April 2026 it became the first Bid Window 7 project to reach financial close. The R4.4 billion plant has a 20-year PPA with the National Transmission Company of South Africa (NTCSA) at a tariff of R458/MWh (approximately US$27/MWh), which the company stated was the lowest price procured to date under South Africa's public renewable energy rounds. It is expected to generate about 770 GWh a year and connects to the Everest Main Transmission Substation.

=== Beaufort West Solar PV ===
The Beaufort West facility, Mulilo's first project in the Western Cape, has an installed capacity of 380 MW_{DC} and a contracted export capacity of 250 MW_{AC}, connecting to the Droërivier Main Transmission Substation. Output of about 818 GWh a year is sold to commercial and industrial customers through a multi-year PPA with the energy trader NOA Group. Lenders included Absa, Standard Bank, Investec and Nedbank.

=== Newcastle Wind Energy Facility ===
Mulilo has lodged environmental applications for a wind complex near Newcastle in KwaZulu-Natal comprising two facilities of up to 200 MW each. In August 2026 the company resolved a land-use overlap with the gas explorer Kinetiko Energy through an agreed exclusion zone; the first facility is planned at 264 MW_{DC}/240 MW_{AC} using 33 Envision Energy turbines, connecting to the Incandu Main Transmission Substation.

== Ownership and financing ==
Mulilo Energy Holdings is majority owned by Copenhagen Infrastructure Partners through CI NMF I, a fund focused on renewable energy investments in growth markets, with Norfund holding a strategic minority stake acquired in 2025 and the founders and management retaining shareholdings. Prior to the CIP transaction, shareholders included the Calulo investment group, whose subsidiary Calulo Renewable Energy co-invested in the Prieska solar plant.

Project-level financing has been provided predominantly by South African commercial banks – Standard Bank, Absa, Nedbank and Investec – and by the Industrial Development Corporation in the company's earlier projects. At corporate level the company has a R7 billion equity holding-company facility from Standard Bank. Mulilo's public procurement projects include black economic empowerment partners such as the Reatile Group and Perpetua, and community trusts holding minority interests.

== Leadership ==
- Jan Oberholzer – Chairman and non-executive director since September 2023; former chief operating officer of Eskom.
- Jan Fourie – Chief executive officer since 1 May 2024; former executive vice-president, Scatec.
- Johnny Cullum – Co-founder; chief executive officer 2008–2024; board member and shareholder.
- Chris Aberdein – Co-founder; former chairman.

== See also ==
- Renewable energy in South Africa
- Energy in South Africa
- Eskom
- Copenhagen Infrastructure Partners
- Prieska–Total Solar Power Station
