= Copperton =

Former town in South Africa

Location of Copperton in the Northern Cape, South Africa

Copperton was a mining town in the central Karoo region of South Africa. As a copper and zinc-mining area, Copperton saw its heyday between 1970 and the end of the 20th century, when it housed about 3,000 workers and their families; amenities included a school and recreation facilities, including a golf course.

== History ==
The copper-zinc mine at Copperton, which had been opened in 1972, was shut down in 1991 by the Anglovaal Mining Group. The 2011 census found 57 inhabitants. Today, most of the buildings have been demolished and only a few houses are used by Armscor, who operate a weapons testing center, Alkantpan Test Range, in the area.

== Renewable Power ==
Several new renewable energy projects (solar and wind) have been allocated through the REIPPPP and these projects will be constructed in the vicinity of this town.

Power plant	Province	Date commissioned (planned)	Installed Capacity MW (planned)	Type	Status	Coordinates	Operator	Notes
Copperton Windfarm	Northern Cape, Copperton	(late 2017)	(102)	Wind	Contracting	29°54′30″S 22°20′45″E	Gestamp Wind	
Garob Wind Farm	Northern Cape, Copperton	(Oct 2018)	(136)	Wind	Contracting	29°55′44″S 22°24′06″E	Enel Green Power	
Mulilo Renewable Energy Solar PV Prieska	Northern Cape, Copperton	1 October 2014	19.93	Solar PV	Operational	29°57′56.4″S 22°18′53.2″E	Mulilo Renewable Energy	
Mulilo Sonnedix Prieska PV	Northern Cape, Copperton	(Dec 2015)	(75)	Solar PV	Under Construction	30°1′27.86″S 22°21′44.02″E	Mulilo Renewable Energy	
Mulilo Prieska PV	Northern Cape, Copperton	(Nov 2015)	(75)	Solar PV	Under Construction	30°2′2.96″S 22°19′10.93″E	Mulilo Renewable Energy	Area: 205 hectares (2.05 km^{2})

== See also ==
- List of power stations in South Africa
- Siyathemba Local Municipality
