= Red Rocket =

Red Rocket may refer to:

- Red Rocket Energy, a South African renewable energy company
- Red Rocket 7, a comic book series
- Solent Blue Line, a bus services in the Eastleigh area
- Matt Bonner, basketball player
- Toronto Transit Commission, a nickname for buses and trains operated in the city
  - G-series (Toronto subway), nicknamed "Red Rocket", used by the Toronto Transit Commission
  - Toronto Rocket, latest rolling stock of the Toronto subway
- Red Rocket, a poem by the Slovene constructivist author Srečko Kosovel
- Rocket Red, a comic book character
- Red Rocket, a digital video decoder board made by the Red Digital Cinema Camera Company
- Red Rocket (film) (2021), a comedy-drama film directed by Sean Baker
- A euphemism for the exposed glans of a dog's penis
