= Integrated Resource Plan =

South African electricity generation study

The Integrated Resource Plan (IRP) is a plan aimed at estimating South Africa's electricity demand. It takes into account how the demand of electricity will be met and the expense of such a demand. The plan refers to electricity generation and expansion programmes.

In formulating the National Development Plan, the Department of Energy gazetted the Integrated Resource Plan 2010-2030 (IRP 2010) in March 2011; this forecasted the energy demand for the 20-year period. In October 2019, IRP 2019 was gazetted; this updates the energy forecast from 2019 to the year 2030. In 2023, a draft IRP 2023 plan was released for the period 2030-2050.

== Objectives ==
The IRP was indicated to be a living document that would be revised and updated regularly. Updated plans were released in 2019 and 2023, after the first in IRP in 2010. The stated objectives of the IRP are:

- Make electricity inexpensive
- Reduce green house gas emissions
- Reduce water usage
- Electricity generation from different sources

== History ==
=== IRP 2023 ===
In December 2023, Cabinet approved the draft Integrated Resource Plan 2023. IRP 2023 takes into account two time horizons, 2030 and 2050. The plan includes significantly altered metrics that forecast a change in the electricity demand projection for the period 2030-2050; some of which are the cost of implementing new power generation technologies, shutting down of coal plants after 2035 and Eskom's forecasted energy availability factor.

The present-to-2030 horizon is based on how far along current REIPPPP projects are in bringing electricity onto the grid.

The 2031-2050 horizon focuses on implementing different types of stable and sustainable energy supply, and carbon capture.

=== IRP 2025 ===
In October 2025, Cabinet set out a R2.23 trillion investment plan that aims to bring 105GW of energy for the period 2030 to 2040.

== Implementation ==
As of IRP 2019, 9910.37 MW have been procured by the Renewable Energy Independent Power Producer Procurement Programme and are in use on the country's electrical grid.

The following capacity has been commissioned as part of Eskom's build programme: 1 332 MW at Ingula Pumped Storage Scheme, 1 588 MW at Medupi, 800 MW at Kusile, and 100 MW at Sere Wind Farm. In total, 18 000 MW have been resourced as additional capacity.

== See also ==
- Energy in South Africa
- Renewable energy in South Africa
- Solar power in South Africa
- Renewable Energy Independent Power Producers Procurement Programme
