= Wolf Wind Farm =

Wind farm in South Africa

- Country: South Africa
- Location: Sarah Baartman District Municipality
- Coordinates: 33.24829°S 24.85524°E
- Status: In Development
- Construction began: 2024
- Owner: Red Rocket
- Operator: Red Rocket

Wind farm
- Type: Onshore

Power generation
- Units operational: 17
- Make and model: Vestas: V162 & V163
- Nameplate capacity: 85MW
- Main Sub-Contractors: Vestas (Turbines), Concor and Optipower (Construction)

The Wolf Wind Farm is a wind farm project being developed by Red Rocket and is located 5km north of Wolwefontein in the Eastern Cape, South Africa. It's currently under construction and is expected to be completed by Q4 2024. Once operational, the wind farm will generating an estimated 360GWh annually. It's anticipated to mitigate a substantial 384,000 tons of CO_{2} emissions each year.

The wind farm will utilize seventeen turbines manufactured by Vestas. These include five powerful V162-6.2MW machines and twelve V163-4.5MW machines, with a combined capacity of 85MW.

Red Rocket secured the project through the South African government's Renewable Energy Independent Power Producers Procurement Programme in Bid Window 5.
