= Renewable energy in South Africa =

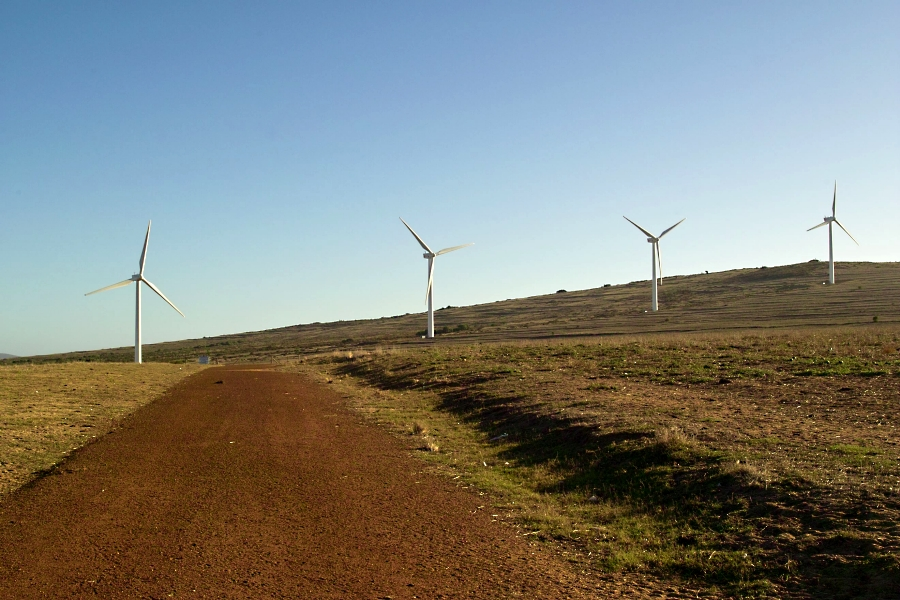
Primary sources of renewable energy in South Africa are solar, wind, hydroelectric, and biomass. Shown here are wind turbines in Darling, Cape Province.

Renewable energy in South Africa is energy generated in South Africa from renewable resources, those that naturally replenish themselves—such as sunlight, wind, tides, waves, biomass, and geothermal heat. Renewable energy focuses on four core areas: electricity generation, air and water heating/cooling, transportation, and rural energy services. The energy sector in South Africa is an important component of global energy regimes due to the country's innovation and advances in renewable energy. South Africa's greenhouse gas (GHG) emissions are ranked as moderate, and its per capita emission rate is higher than the global average. Energy demand within the country is expected to rise steadily and double by 2025.

Total renewable energy capacity, 2014–2024 (MW)
2014	2015	2016	2017	2018	2019	2020	2021	2022	2023	2024
2,711	3,430	4,652	6,552	7,911	8,014	9,523	9,827	10,505	10,623	11,129

Of all South African renewable energy sources, solar holds the most potential. Because of the country's geographic location, it receives large amounts of solar energy. Wind energy is also a major potential source of renewable energy. Due to the high wind velocity on the coast of the country, Cape Town has implemented multiple wind farms, which generate significant amounts of energy. Renewable energy systems in the long-term are comparable or cost slightly less than non-renewable sources. Biomass is currently the largest renewable energy contributor in South Africa with 9-14% of the total energy mix. Renewable energy systems are costly to implement in the beginning but provide high economic returns in the long-run.

The two main barriers accompanying renewable energy in South Africa are: the energy innovation system, and the high cost of renewable energy technologies. The Renewable Energy Independent Power Producer Procurement Programme (REI4P) suggests that the cost associated with renewable energy will equal the cost of non-renewable energy by 2030. Renewable energy is becoming more efficient, inexpensive, and widely used. South Africa has an abundance of renewable resources that can effectively supply the country's energy.

== Policies and regulations ==
South Africa is a member of the International Renewable Energy Agency (IRENA), an international organization that promotes renewable energy policies. The IRENA helps with tools to create policies and the transition of technology necessary for renewable energy. It provides an assessment of resources, finance management, policy and legal framework, and the capacity of the energy sector.

=== Renewable Energy Feed-In Tariff (2009–2011) ===
The National Energy Regulator of South Africa (NERSA) implemented the Renewable Energy Feed-In Tariff (REFIT) in 2009. The REFIT works to progressively reduce carbon-based power generation by moving in the direction of renewable energy sources. NERSA employed the REFIT in an attempt to meet the target of producing 10TWh of electricity by 2013. When first introduced, the feed-in tariffs applied only to wind energy, hydropower, and concentrated solar power (CSP). Six months after the introduction, the tariffs were expanded to include biomass and solar photovoltaics. The organization wants to achieve sustainability through the use of renewable resources while engaging stakeholders, lowering the cost of investment, and making the cost of electricity more affordable for all people. The decentralized investment opportunity provides South Africa with the resources to overcome its current energy crisis. REFIT is the first successful greenhouse gas mitigating projects used in South Africa. The REFIT program was superseded by the Renewable Energy Independent Power Producer Procurement Programme in May 2011.

=== Renewable Energy Independent Power Producer Procurement Programme (since 2011) ===
South Africa first introduced the Renewable Energy Independent Power Producer Procurement Programme (REI4P) in 2011. The program includes an initiative to install 17.8GW of renewable energy in South Africa before 2030. The goal of the REI4P is to reduce greenhouse gas emissions while minimizing the country's reliance on non-renewable energy sources such as nuclear and coal. REI4P also works to promote local manufacturing of materials used in the renewable energy sector.

=== Tax incentive (since 2016) ===
To incentivize the further rollout of renewable energy generation by the private sector, the South African Revenue Service has of 1 January 2016 amended the Income Tax Act No. 58 of 1962 to include accelerated depreciation for renewable energy assets commissioned by a tax paying entity. This tax incentive is not limited to new renewable generation systems.

==== Photovoltaic solar energy generation ====
Government plans make a special provision for photovoltaic systems that are smaller or equal to 1 MW_{p} (megawatt peak) in section 12 B of the Tax Act. Owners can depreciate the investment 100% in the first year.

Depreciating the photovoltaic solar system 100% in the first year grants the taxpayer a tax shield due to saved income tax. This provides, in effect, a 28% discount on the photovoltaic solar system. The tax shield applies even if the photovoltaic solar system is installed mid-year. By partially financing the photovoltaic solar system through debt, systems can achieve a repayment time of 1 year. Systems subsequently achieve ongoing electricity savings for each year of operation.

==== Other renewable energy generation ====
Wind power, concentrated solar power (CSP), biomass, photovoltaic systems exceeding 1 MW_{p}, hydropower not exceeding 30 MW as well as biomass systems are also incentivized through an accelerated depreciation with the following schedule:

- Year 1: 50% depreciation
- Year 2: 30% depreciation
- Year 3: 20% depreciation
- Year 4: 10% depreciation

== Types of energy ==
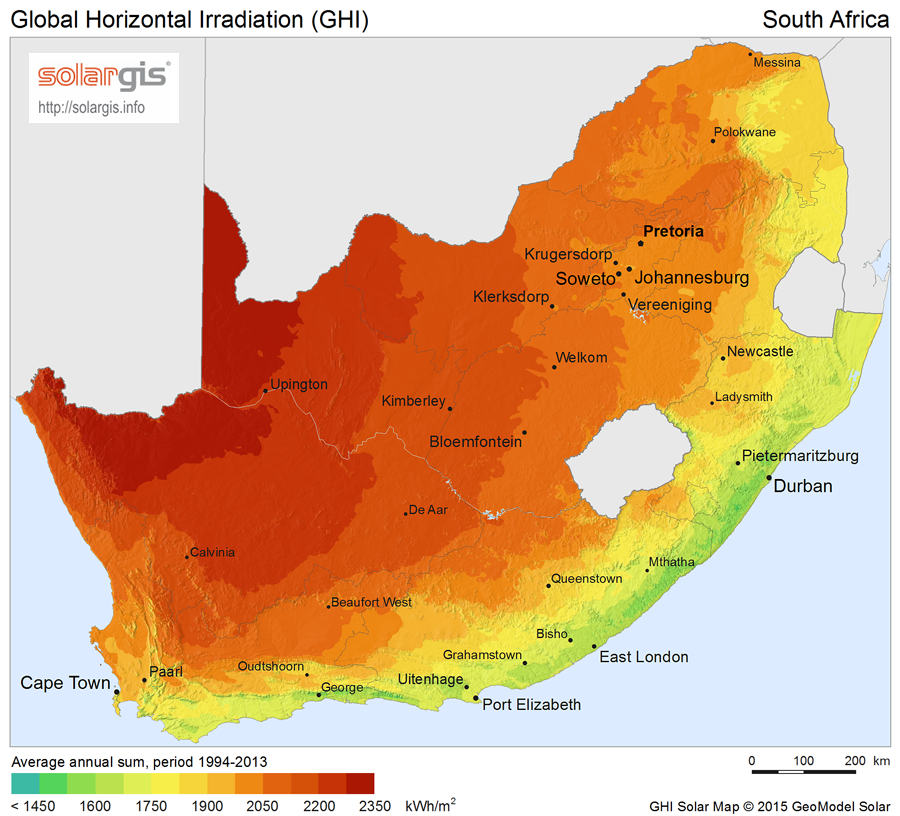
South Africa receives large amounts of solar radiation each year.

=== Solar energy ===
Solar energy is light and heat that is radiated from the Sun. It is then transformed into electricity through photovoltaics (PV) or concentrated solar power (CSP). Solar energy in South Africa is primarily based in PV and CSP. The levelized cost of solar electricity is relative to the quality and quantity of solar radiation in South Africa. The same plant can produce up to 20% more electricity for the same capital investment in South Africa compared to countries in Europe. The furthest area in the west of the country receives the highest levels of solar radiation, ranging from 2100 kWh/m2 to more than 2300 kWh/m2. Solar power production in South Africa is predicted to reach 8400 MW by the year 2030. South Africa implemented a solar park in the Northern Cape region that is set to deliver 180,000 MWh of annual solar energy to the country. It is estimated that only 3000 km^2 of land used for solar electricity is required to meet South Africa's demand.

Solar energy capacity 2014–2024 (MW)
2014	2015	2016	2017	2018	2019	2020	2021	2022	2023	2024
1,164	1,353	2,176	3,451	4,805	4,908	5,994	6,316	6,326	6,164	6,671

Solar energy is a low-cost source of energy compared to traditional non-renewable energy resources in South Africa. The introduction of solar power plants has stimulated the economy and created jobs within the country. South Africa's land cover receives an average of 2,500 hours of sunshine per year. Solar energy systems have a high initial cost, but typically return the investment within 5 to 8 years. The use of solar energy in South Africa is driving the use of other renewable energy sources including wind, hydroelectric, and biomass.

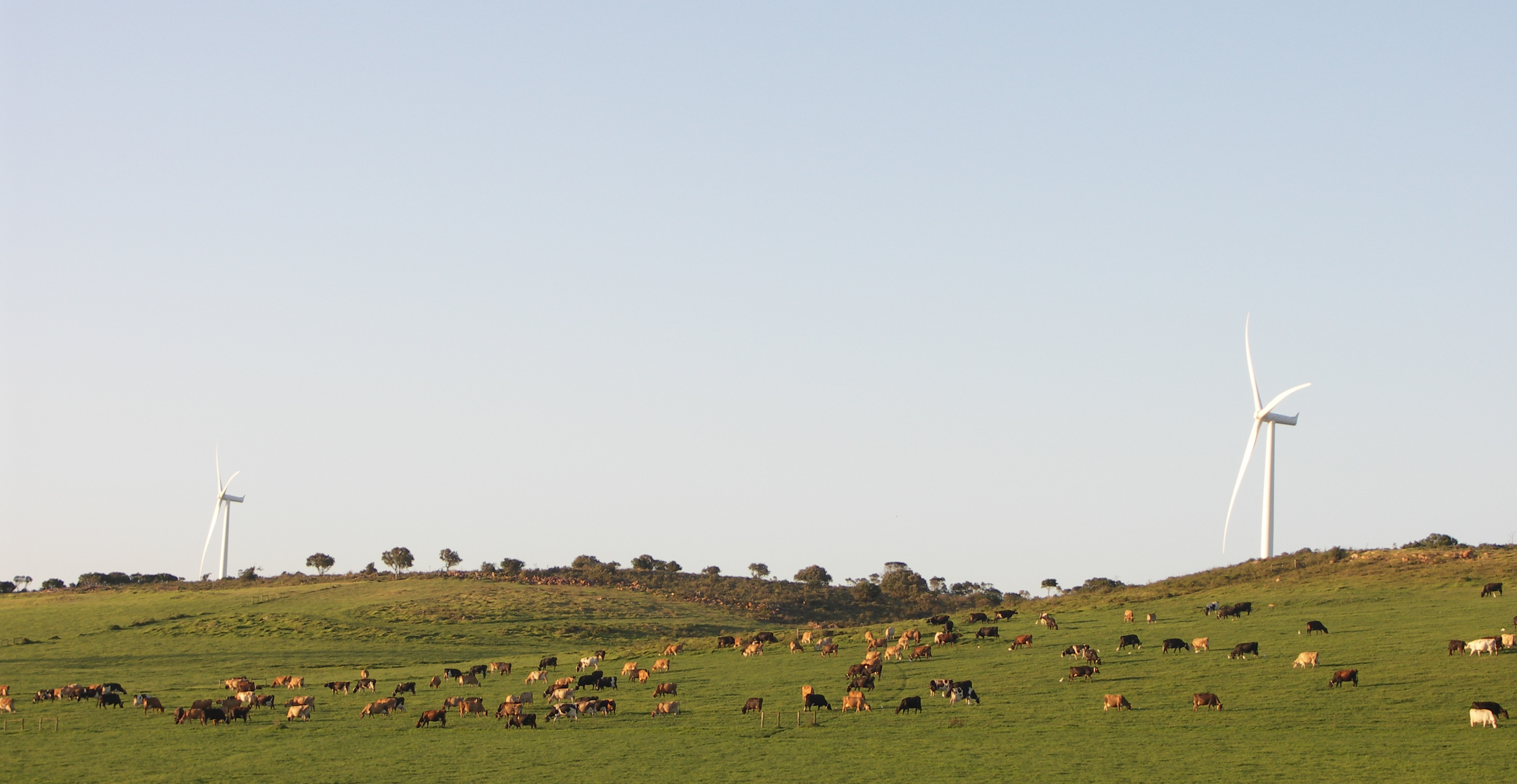
Jeffrey's Bay Wind Farm is located on the Eastern cape and has a production output of 100MW. It is the second largest wind farm in South Africa.

=== Wind energy ===
Wind power uses wind turbines to produce electric power. Wind levels vary depending on factors such as terrain, bodies of water and vegetative cover. Wind turbines convert the wind into kinetic energy and mechanical power. The wind turns 50-metre-long blades attached to 80 metre-high shafts that generate the electric energy. Wind turbine farms can range between 10MW to over 100 MW and produce energy when the wind is between 13–90 km/h. Wind turbines farms can be onshore or offshore. Offshore have stronger winds and less visual impact.

Wind energy capacity 2014–2023 (MW)
2014	2015	2016	2017	2018	2019	2020	2021	2022	2023	2024
569	1,079	1,473	2,094	2,094	2,094	2,516	2,495	3,163	3,442	3,442

In 2014 the first major wind farm became operational, with approximately 10 either operational or in construction today. South Africa's extensive coastline and geographical terrain including lowlands and high veld escarpment, provide wind energy that can be extracted and generated into off-the-shelf technology. There are currently 19 wind energy developments in South Africa with more than 600 wind turbines. On the international scale, South Africa ranks as having fair to reasonable wind resources. Wind power is a renewable, widely distributed and clean form of energy. The production of wind energy does not produce greenhouse gases and is an alternative to burning fossil fuels.

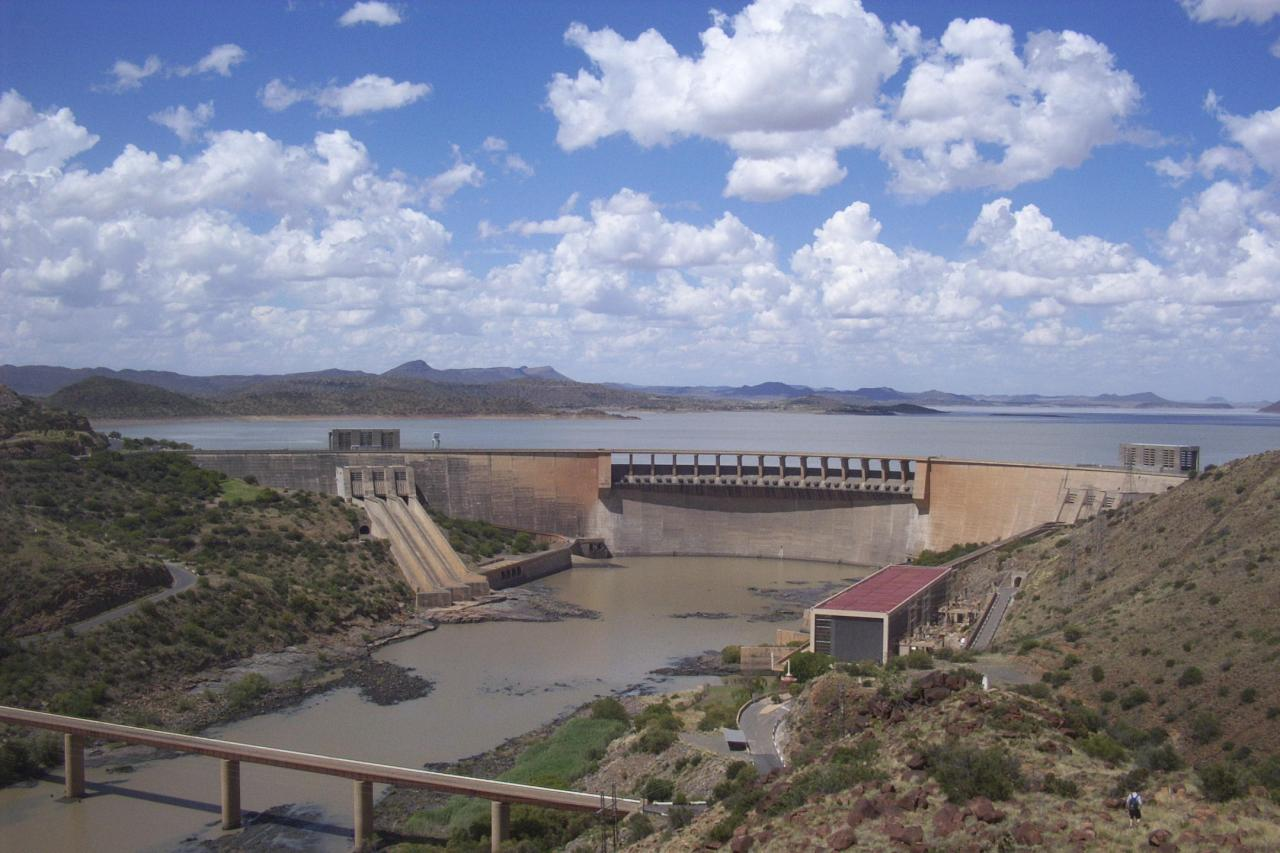
Gariep Dam, located in Eastern Cape, is a large-scale hydroelectric site with the primary purposes of power generation, irrigation, domestic and industrial use.

South Africa's installed wind capacity reaches 3,442 MW in 2022, with 668 MW installed in 2021 and no new installations in 2022. South Africa remains the leading African country ahead of Morocco (1,788 MW) and Egypt (1,702 MW).

=== Hydropower ===
Hydropower, or hydroelectric power, is energy that is captured from flowing water and turned into electricity. The most common forms of hydropower use hydroelectric dams to create a reservoir. Water released from the reservoir flows through a turbine that generates electricity. South Africa currently has seven hydroelectric power stations across the country, all owned by Eskom. The country's hydroelectricity potential is limited due to the low annual rainfall rate of 500mm. South Africa experiences seasonal flows and frequent droughts, which pose obstacles to the hydropower success. The Eastern Cape province is the most hydro-potential in the country.

Hydropower capacity 2014–2023 (MW)
2014	2015	2016	2017	2018	2019	2020	2021	2022	2023	2024
2,133	2,148	3,147	3,480	3,480	3,480	3,480	3,484	3,484	3,484	3,484

Hydroelectric dams in South Africa can be associated with other water uses, such as irrigation and flood control, to increase economic development within the country. The current installed capacity within the country is 668MW. Large-scale (>10MW) hydroelectric generation systems have the potential to contribute up to 5091MW of energy, but can have negative implications on the environment. The large amount of flowing water can damage river ecology, and the facilities take up a significant amount of land space. Small-scale (<10MW) hydroelectric generation systems can contribute up to 69MW of energy and do not have any major environmental implications.

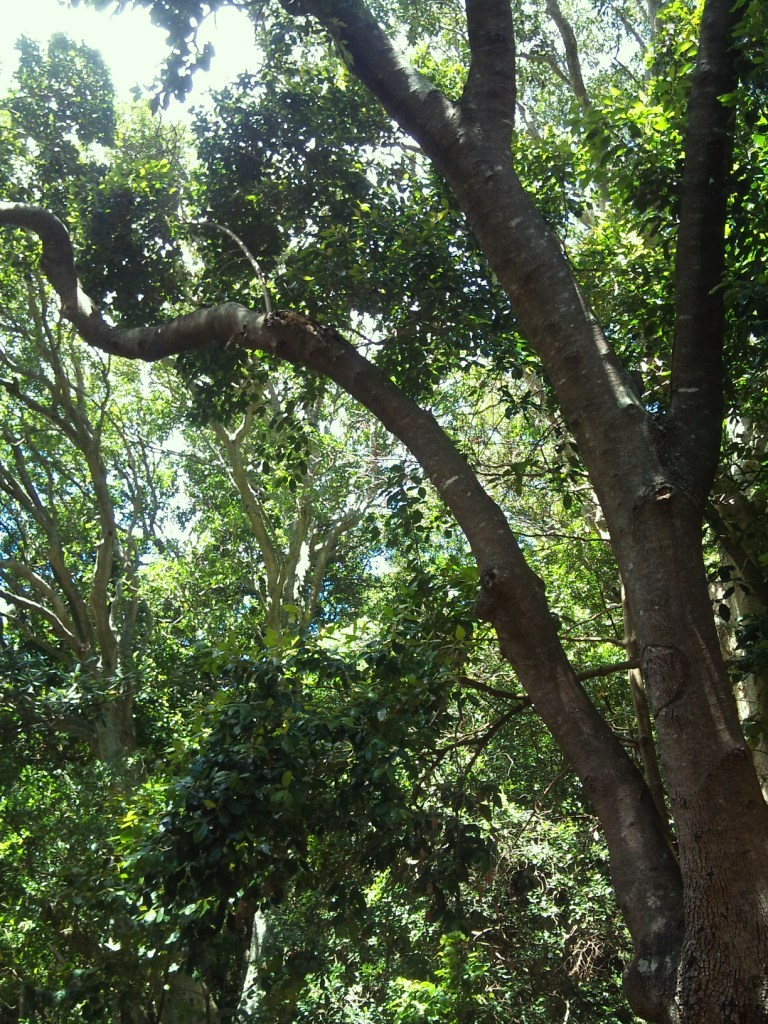
Biomass is the largest renewable energy contributor in South Africa, holding 9-14% of the energy mix.

=== Biomass ===
Biomass is physical biological material that comes from living or recently living organisms. It comes from plants or materials derived from plants (lignocellulosic biomass). Biomass has the capacity to produce electricity, heat, or liquid fuels. Biomass can be used as a direct energy source as heating or cooking fuel, or can be burned to generate electricity. It can also be used indirectly by using its biological processes and producing ethanol, methanol, and fuel that can be used in transportation and cooking processes. Wood is currently the largest producer of biomass fuel—including tree stumps, forest residue, dead trees, and wood chips. Animal matter and plant matter can also be converted into forms of biofuel.

Bioenergy capacity 2014–2023 (MW)
2014	2015	2016	2017	2018	2019	2020	2021	2022	2023	2024
246	251	256	260	265	265	265	265	265	265	265

South Africa currently has several biodiesel production facilities in production. South Africa's 42 million hectares of natural woodlands and 1.35 million hectares of plantation provide a large potential for biomass production. The South African government has a Working for Energy Programme that aims to process biomass energy for various applications.

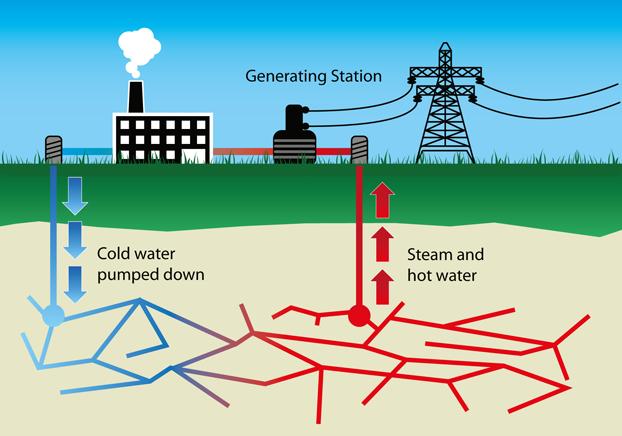
Geothermal energy is produced by extracting heat from the Earth's crust and converting it to electricity.

=== Geothermal energy ===
Geothermal energy is generated from heat that is stored in the Earth. The geothermal energy that is generated from the Earth's crust is the original formation of the planet and from radioactive decay of material. Geothermal heat pumps tap into the ground to use this resource as a source of energy. The production of geothermal energy is a clean and sustainable form of energy. There are currently no geothermal energy practices in South Africa but there are projects underway to implement them. Geothermal measurements have been made throughout South Africa, demonstrating that there is high geothermal potential and that the relevant temperatures rank from medium to high on the global scale.

== Energy providers ==
The South African energy sector has historically been dominated by state-owned provider Eskom. However, there are numerous independent power producers operating in the renewable energy sector, with large-scale projects continuing to be developed in South Africa, and other African countries. These include wind, solar, and hydro power plants, some of which have partnerships with other South African energy companies for wheeled energy.

As of mid-2026, major IPPs headquartered in SA, and foreign companies with offices located in SA, include:

Company	Origin	Local HQ/Office	Established	Technologies	Installed capacity	Confirmed pipeline	Ref
ABO Energy	Foreign	Cape Town	2018; 8 years ago	Wind, solar photovoltaic (PV), battery energy storage systems (BESS)	—	5,899 MW	
Acciona Energía	Foreign	Cape Town	2008; 18 years ago	Wind, solar PV	232 MW	194 MW	
ACWA Power	Foreign	Cape Town	2004; 22 years ago	Solar PV, Concentrated solar power, wind, BESS	600 MW	442 MW	
African Rainbow Energy	South Africa (SA)	Johannesburg	2012; 14 years ago	Solar PV, wind	968 MW	132 MW	
Anthem	SA	Cape Town	2012; 14 years ago	Solar PV, wind, BESS	—	—	
BioTherm Energy	SA	Johannesburg	2003; 23 years ago	Wind, solar PV, biogas	516 MW	—	
BTE Renewables	Foreign	Johannesburg	2003; 23 years ago	Wind, solar PV	500 MW	—	
EDF Renewables	Foreign	Cape Town	1987; 39 years ago	Wind, solar PV, BESS, Biomass, hydropower	1,082 MW	332 MW	
Enel Green Power	Foreign	Johannesburg	2008; 18 years ago	Wind, solar PV	720 MW	—	
ENGIE Africa	Foreign	Johannesburg	1996; 30 years ago	Wind, solar PV, Concentrated solar power, BESS	1,600 MW	555 MW	
G7 Renewable Energies	SA	Cape Town	2008; 18 years ago	Wind, solar PV, BESS	435 MW	591 MW	
Globeleq	Foreign	Cape Town	2002; 24 years ago	Solar PV, wind, BESS, geothermal	1,769 MW	485 MW	
JUWI South Africa	Foreign	Cape Town	2011; 15 years ago	Solar PV, wind	500 MW	400 MW	
Mainstream Renewable Power	Foreign	Cape Town	2008; 18 years ago	Wind, solar PV	857 MW	2,000 MW	
Mulilo	SA	Cape Town	2008; 18 years ago	Wind, solar PV, BESS	420 MW	876 MW	
NOA Group	SA	Cape Town	2022; 4 years ago	Solar PV, wind, BESS	—	1,400 MW	
Oya Energy	SA	Johannesburg	2020; 6 years ago	Solar PV, wind, BESS	—	335 MW	
Pele Green Energy	SA	Johannesburg	2009; 17 years ago	Solar PV, wind, BESS	2,000 MW	200 MW	
Phelan Green Group	SA	Cape Town	2005; 21 years ago	Solar PV, wind, BESS	500 MW	—	
Red Rocket Energy	SA	Cape Town	2012; 14 years ago	Wind, solar PV, hydroelectric	386 MW	1,312 MW	
RES	Foreign	Cape Town	1981; 45 years ago	Wind, solar PV, BESS, Energy storage	—	—	
SOLA Group	SA	Cape Town	2008; 18 years ago	Solar PV	232 MW	506 MW	
TotalEnergies Renewables Southern Africa	Foreign	Johannesburg	2022; 4 years ago	Solar PV, wind, BESS	86 MW	614 MW	
Total	23 companies	—	—	—	13,403 MW	16,273 MW	—

== Future research ==
South Africa is one of the most popular countries for investment in renewable energy. In 2014, the country received US$5.5 billion towards renewable energy projects. Renewable energy in South Africa has the potential to increase access to electricity in rural areas because of its suitability for off-grid and small-scale solutions. The barriers of renewable energy in the country include lack of political stability and capacity, marginalization, corruption, poverty, and environmental degradation. The government introduces both short-to-medium and long-term targets to help set the pace of renewable energy production.

A financial barrier exists in the renewable energy sector in South Africa. Investors choose to invest in large-scale non-renewable resource companies, such as Eskom, rather than independent power producers such as BioTherm, Mulilo, and juwi South Africa. The high initial capital required to employ renewable energy is a large constraint the sector experiences.

== See also ==
- Energy in South Africa
- Solar power in South Africa
- Biomass heating system
- List of renewable energy topics by country
