= Red Rocket Energy =

South African independent power producer

- Type: Private
- Industry: Energy; Renewable energy
- Founded: 2012; 14 years ago
- Headquarters: Cape Town, South Africa
- Area served: Africa
- Key people: Matteo Brambilla (CEO)
- Products: Electricity
- Services: Energy trading Public EV charging (via Black Tower Energy)
- Owner: Inspired Evolution funds, and management
- Number of employees: 200+ (2026)
- Website: redrocket.energy

Red Rocket Energy is a South African renewable energy company and independent power producer (IPP). Founded in 2012 and headquartered in Cape Town, the company has produced numerous large-scale solar, wind, and hydro power plants in multiple African countries.

The company also operates a network of Public EV chargers, across numerous South African provinces, through its Black Tower Energy joint venture with commercial bank FNB.

== History ==
The company began in 2012, as the Middle East and African division of Italian independent power producer (IPP) Building Energy. Following a management buyout in 2020, Red Rocket launched as its own independent IPP.

In 2020, Red Rocket obtained US$31.4 million in funding from the Evolution II fund, managed by African clean energy investment firm Inspired Evolution. The renewable energy funding was for projects in South Africa, Zambia, Uganda, Mali, and Eswatini.

In 2023, the company received funding totaling US$46.8 million from the Evolution III fund, by Inspired Evolution. This was for renewable energy infrastructure projects in South Africa, Zambia, Uganda, and Mali. Later that year, it was announced that US$160 million in funding had been obtained from a consortium of investors, including Inspired Evolution, FMO, Stoa, and Bill Kilgore Investments.

Also in 2023, a new public EV charging company, Black Tower Energy, was registered with the CIPC. The records showed that Red Rocket's CEO was one of its directors. The company is a joint venture with South African commercial bank FNB. It began rolling out chargers in 2025.

In October 2025, it was reported that Red Rocket Energy had reached financial close on a R5.2 billion, 300MW solar PV project, called Tournee Solar Park. The project will be built on land leased from Eskom, located near the Tutuka coal power station in Mpumalanga. The plant's off-taker is wheeled renewable energy company Discovery Green. The project is expected to take two years to build, and enter commercial operation in Q4 2027. Red Rocket CEO said Tournee is an example of how public-private partnerships (PPPs) could deliver large-scale renewable projects, as part of South Africa's energy transition.

In December 2025, the company secured an energy trading license from the National Energy Regulator of South Africa (NERSA).

That same month, South African Minister of Electricity and Energy Kgosientsho Ramokgopa announced the appointment of preferred bidders for four additional solar PV projects, under the seventh bid window of the government's Renewable Energy Independent Power Producer Procurement Programme (REIPPPP). This followed the conclusion of value-for-money (VfM) negotiations. The REIPPPP Bid Window 7 had the goal of facilitating the procurement of up to 5,000 MW of renewable energy capacity, which consisted of 1,800 MW of solar PV generation, and 3,200 MW of onshore wind capacity. Three of the four new solar projects went to Red Rocket Energy. These were the Rondebosch Solar Park, Springhaas Solar Facility 1, and Springhaas Solar Facility 6, all of which are located in the Free State.

In June 2026, Red Rocket had reached a total developed renewable capacity of over 22,000MW.

== Operations ==
Red Rocket's projects include:

Power station	Technology	Capacity	Location
Kruisvallei Hydro Plant	Hydro	4 MW	Free State, South Africa
Tororo Solar North	Solar	10 MW	Eastern Uganda
Kathu Solar PV	Solar	81 MW	Northern Cape, South Africa
Wolf Wind Farm	Wind	85 MW	Eastern Cape, South Africa
Witberg Wind Farm	Wind	108 MW	Western Cape, South Africa
Brandvalley Wind Farm	Wind	144 MW	Western Cape, South Africa
Rietkloof Wind Farm	Wind	144 MW	Western Cape, South Africa
Roggeveld Wind Farm	Wind	147 MW	Western Cape, South Africa
Virginia Solar Park	Solar	275 MW	Free State, South Africa
Tournee Solar Park	Solar	300 MW	Mpumalanga, South Africa
Overberg Wind Farm	Wind	400 MW	Western Cape, South Africa

== See also ==
- Electricity sector in South Africa
- Plug-in electric vehicles in South Africa
