= Anthem (energy company) =

South African independent renewable energy producer

- Industry: Renewable energy production
- Predecessor: ACED and EIMS (pre-merger)
- Founded: 2025; 1 year ago
- Headquarters: Cape Town, South Africa
- Number of locations: 17, with a further 7 in development (2026)
- Area served: South Africa; Eswatini
- Key people: James Cumming (CEO)
- Services: Renewable energy from wind, solar, and hydro facilities
- Owner: Various, including Old Mutual (IDEAS Fund), Norfund, and Mahlako Energy Fund
- Number of employees: ~ 100 (2026)
- Website: anthem.co.za

Anthem is a major South African renewable energy company, and an independent power producer (IPP). The company develops, finances, constructs, and operates utility-scale renewable energy projects in Southern Africa.

Founded in 2025, and headquartered in Cape Town, Anthem is one of the country's largest and most diversified IPPs, with upwards of 15% of the total renewable production market share.

As of March 2026, Anthem has 17 power projects in operation across South Africa and Eswatini, with a total capacity of 1.1 GW. It has another 435 MW of renewable capacity in construction, and a further 1.2 GW of capacity in financial close, bringing its total secured capacity to 2.7 GW. Anthem has targeted a total capacity of 6 GW by 2030.

== History ==
Anthem was founded in October 2025, through the merger of two renewable energy companies - African Clean Energy Developments (ACED), a renewables development and delivery platform, and Environmental Impact Management Services (EIMS), a green energy asset manager.

Before the merger, both companies were part of financial institution Old Mutual's R30 billion IDEAS Fund, which is managed by the company's African Infrastructure Investment Managers.

In December 2025, Anthem and major financial institution RMB closed an R8.5 billion facility. The funding would enable the issuance of performance bonds, equity guarantees, and cash draws for underlying projects, bridging, or acquisitions, thereby playing a major role in unlocking Anthem's development pipeline. The facility's accordion feature also allows for future upsizing of the financing beyond the original total.

In February 2026, Norwegian renewable energy fund manager Norfund was given permission by South Africa's Competition Commission to acquire a shareholding in Anthem. The deal was worth R1.4 billion, most of which was derived from Norfund's Climate Investment Fund, with the rest coming from a joint investment company, which is 51% owned by Norway's largest pension fund company, KLP, and 49% owned by Norfund. Around the same time, the Competition Commission also approved Mahlako Energy Fund's acquisition of a shareholding in Anthem.

== Operations ==
As of March 2026, Anthem has a total of 17 operational projects across South Africa and Eswatini, with a total capacity of 1.1 GW. These include seven wind power facilities, 11 solar energy facilities, and one hydro power plant. At the same time, Anthem had another 435 MW of total renewable capacity in construction, and a further 1.2 GW of capacity in financial close. The table below contains all of Anthem's operational power projects.

Anthem energy projects (March 2026)
Facility name	Type	Location
Lower Magaduza Hydro	Hydro	Eswatini
Greefspan Solar PV	Solar	Northern Cape
Waterloo Solar PV	Solar	North West
Vredendal Solar PV	Solar	Western Cape
Herbert Solar PV	Solar	Northern Cape
Aurora Solar PV	Solar	Western Cape
Zeerust Solar PV	Solar	North West
REISA Solar PV	Solar	Northern Cape
Matla A Bokone Solar PV	Solar	Northern Cape
De Wildt Solar PV	Solar	North West
Bokamoso Solar PV	Solar	North West
Boikanyo Solar PV	Solar	Northern Cape
Umsinde Emoyeni Wind Farm	Wind	Western Cape
Khangela Emoyeni Wind Farm	Wind	Western Cape
Ishwati Emoyeni Wind Farm	Wind	Western Cape
Msenge Emoyeni Wind Farm	Wind	Eastern Cape
Umoya Wind Energy Facility	Wind	Western Cape
Cookhouse Wind Farm	Wind	Eastern Cape
Castle Wind Farm	Wind	Northern Cape

One of Anthem's projects, Castle Wind Farm, is South Africa's largest operational private-offtake wind farm. It was developed in partnership with the project's offtaker, South African mining company Sibanye-Stillwater.

== Corporate social responsibility ==
Over the period 2014 through 2026, Anthem's projects offset 11.3 million tons of CO2. Over the same period, the company also invested over R600 million in socio-economic and enterprise development initiatives, which supported around 1,200 SMMEs across various communities where Anthem operates.

== See also ==
- Electricity sector in South Africa
- Renewable energy in South Africa
