= Rand Merchant Bank =

South African corporate and investment bank

- Type: Division
- Industry: Financial services
- Founded: 1968; 58 years ago
- Headquarters: Sandton, Gauteng, South Africa
- Area served: Africa; United Kingdom; United States; India; China
- Services: Corporate banking Investment banking Advisory; Trading
- Net income: ▲ R11.04 billion (2025)
- Total assets: ▲ R808.34 billion (2025)
- Parent: FirstRand (via FirstRand Bank Limited)
- Website: rmb.co.za

Portside Tower in Cape Town CBD, with the RMB logo on the side. The bank is one of the main tenants, and the building was co-developed by its parent company, FirstRand

Rand Merchant Bank, commonly referred to simply as RMB, is a South African corporate and investment bank. Founded in 1968 and headquartered in Sandton, Gauteng, RMB is a division of major financial services corporation FirstRand.

RMB provides services including investment banking, corporate lending, advisory, trading, and transactional banking, primarily to large companies and institutional clients.

== History ==
Rand Merchant Bank was established in Johannesburg in 1968, as a subsidiary of financial institution Rand Bank.

In 1977, Rand Bank ceased operations. That same year, South African businessman Johann Rupert and a group of associates formed a consortium that acquired RMB from Rand Bank.

In 1985, Johannesburg-based financial services company Rand Consolidated Investments (RCI) acquired control of RMB.

In 1987, Rand Merchant Holdings (RMH) was created as a holding company for the expanding RMB business.

In 1998, FirstRand was created through the merger of the financial services interests of RMB Holdings and Anglo American Corporation. The following year, FirstRand underwent restructuring, and both RMB and FNB continued operating as separate divisions of the parent company.

RMB expanded its African operations during the early 2010s. After establishing a representative office in Nigeria in 2010, it obtained a license to operate a banking in the country in 2012, allowing it to expand its corporate advisory, infrastructure finance, structured trade, and capital markets activities into West Africa.

In 2009, FirstRand Bank established a branch in India after receiving a commercial banking licence from the Reserve Bank of India. The branch was managed by RMB and became part of the group's efforts to facilitate investment and trade between India and Africa.

In 2018, RMB reported pre-tax profits of over R10 billion for the first time. Its pre-tax profits of R10.4 billion represented a 6% increase year-over-year.

In July 2020, FirstRand's independent asset management business, Ashburton Investments, was incorporated into RMB as part of a restructuring, intended to expand RMB's investment offering to corporate and institutional clients.

RMB Capital India was established in 2022. The following year, FirstRand's Indian corporate finance business was transferred to the new subsidiary, and began operating as an RMB brand.

In 2023, RMB acquired a 25% shareholding in Ubiquity Energy, the parent company of South African renewable energy wheeling business EXSA, from investment holding company Remgro.

That same year, operations outside South Africa accounted for 31% of RMB's profit before tax.

In 2025, RMB acquired the South African corporate banking portfolio of British banking group HSBC.

In April 2026, RMB entered into a strategic partnership with exchange conglomerate Singapore Exchange's SGX FX platform, to broaden international access to liquidity in African currencies.

== Operations ==
As of 2026, RMB operates in nine African countries, as well as the United Kingdom, United States, China, and India. The company provides corporate transactional banking, investment banking, financial advisory services, private equity, and private banking services.

== See also ==
- Banking in South Africa
