= National Transmission Company of South Africa =

Subsidiary of Eskom

- Trade name: National Transmission Company (SOC) Ltd
- Type: State-owned enterprise
- Industry: Energy
- Headquarters: Megawatt Park, 2 Maxwell Drive, Sunninghill, Sandton, Gauteng, South Africa
- Area served: South Africa
- Key people: Priscillah Mabelane (Chairperson); Monde Bala (CEO)
- Services: Electricity transmission
- Number of employees: 2,928 (2022)
- Parent: Eskom
- Website: ntcsa.co.za

South African electricity transmission line infrastructure as at September 2023

The National Transmission Company of South Africa (NTCSA) is the company responsible for the transmission of electricity in South Africa.

A wholly owned subsidiary of state-owned energy company Eskom, the NTCSA was established in 2023, following the unbundling of Eskom into three separate entities.

== History ==
At the 2019 State of the Nation Address, President Ramaphosa announced that Eskom would be unbundled into three wholly owned entities; namely, Generation, Transmission and Distribution.

In 2020, Eskom began establishing independent boards and directors.

On 17 December 2021, Eskom legally transferred its transmission division to the National Transmission Company of South Africa; 374 transmission lines with a total length of 33 199 km, 500 three-phase transformers with a total capacity of 159 384 MVA located at 169 transmission substations were transferred to the NTCSA.

On 13 January 2023, NTCSA applied to the National Energy Regulator of South Africa for transmission, import/export and trade licences. In July 2023, the transmission licence was granted. In September 2023, the trading and import/export licences were granted.

On 1 July 2024, NTCSA began trading with Eskom and independent power producers.

== Duties ==
The NTCSA is charged with procuring electricity from Eskom power stations, the Southern African Power Pool and independent power producers in the Renewable Energy Independent Power Producer Procurement Programme and Risk Mitigation Programme. It will sell energy and capacity to the Distribution subsidiary.

The NTCSA is currently functioning as the interim Transmission System Operator (TSO). During SONA 2026, President Ramaphosa stated the future function of the NTSCA would be independent from Eskom (not as a subsidiary) and it would own and maintain transmission assets.

== See also ==
- South African energy crisis
- Renewable Energy Independent Power Producer Procurement Programme
- List of power stations in South Africa
