= Solar power in South Africa =

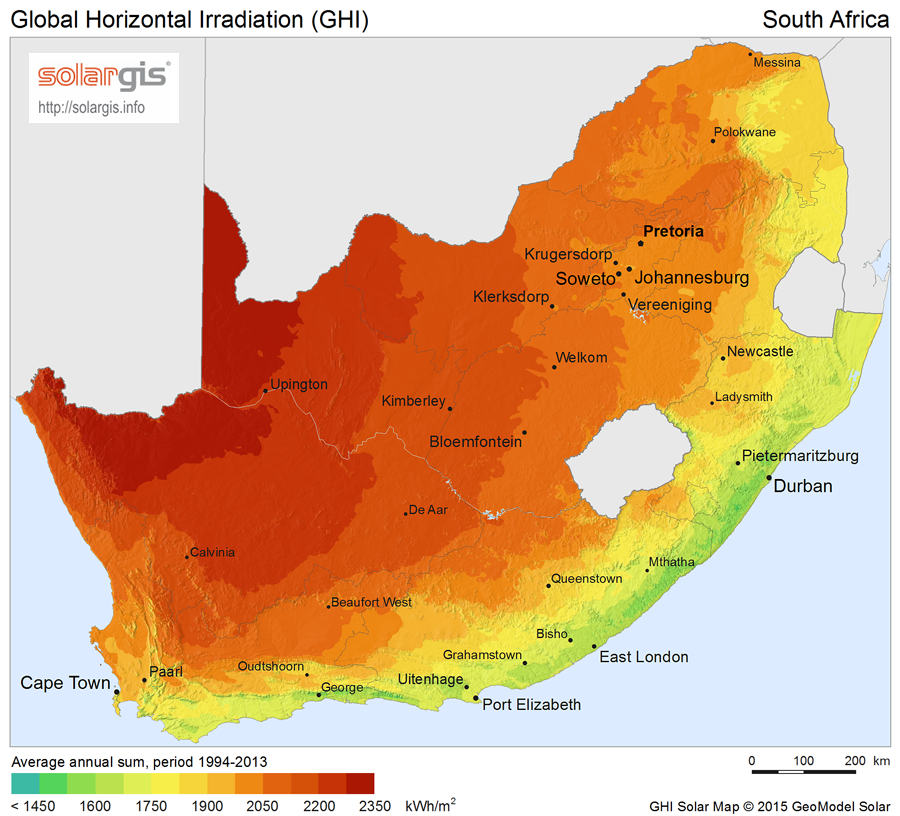
- Solar irradiation map of South Africa
- Installed capacity: 7 GW (2024) (16th)
- Annual generation: 20 TWh (2024)
- Capacity per capita: 110 W (2024)
- Share of electricity: 8% (2024)

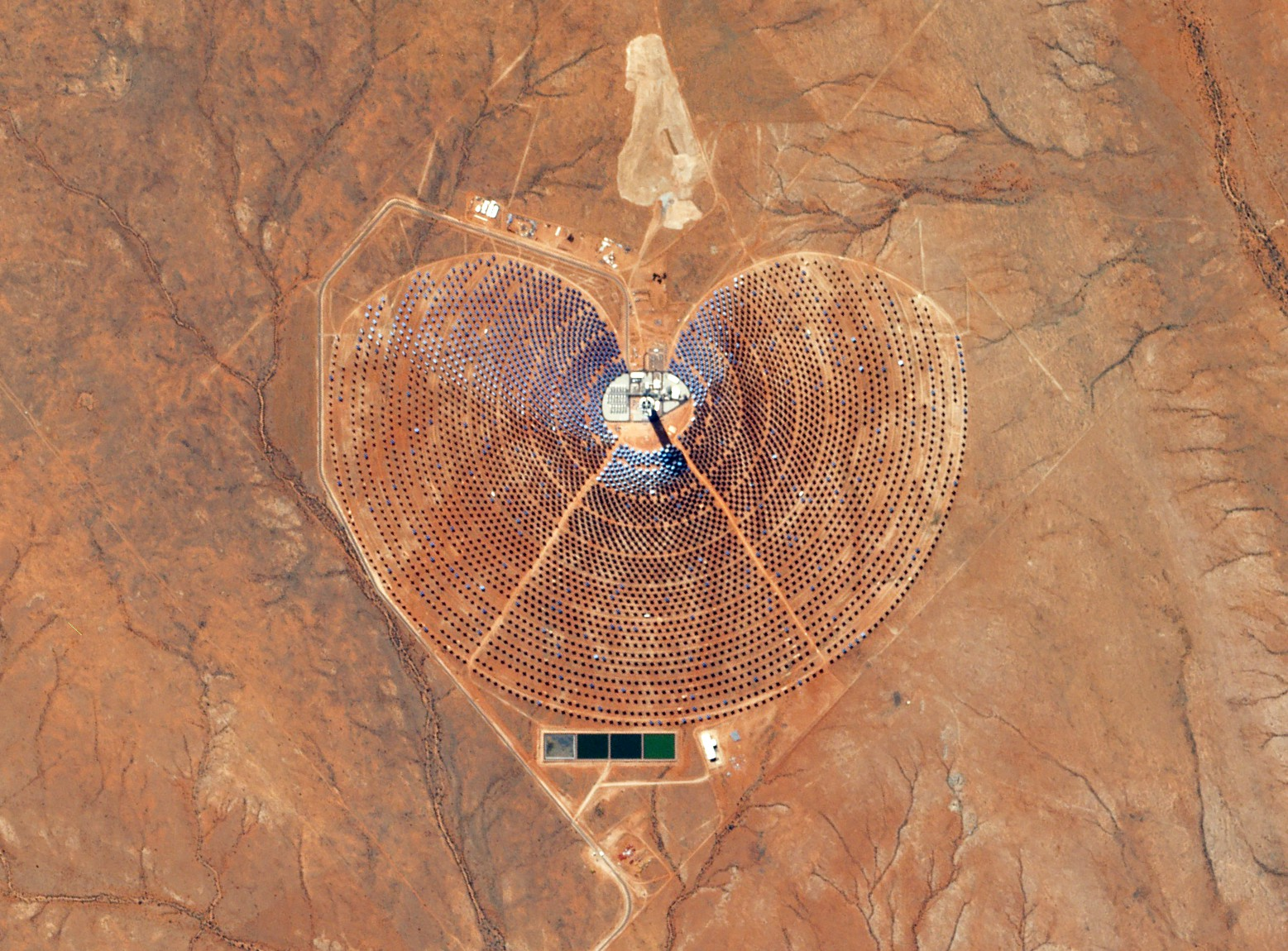
Khi Solar One concentrated solar power plant

Solar power in South Africa includes photovoltaics (PV) as well as concentrated solar power (CSP). As of July 2024, South Africa had 2,287 MW of installed utility-scale PV solar power capacity in its grid, in addition to 5,791 MW of rooftop solar and 500 MW of CSP. Installed capacity is expected to reach 14 GW by 2030.

== Government programs ==
As of 1 January 2016 the South African government gave a tax incentive through the South African Revenue Service for the installation of photovoltaic solar energy generation systems. Depending on the size defined in MW_{p} (Megawatt peak) of the photovoltaic solar system, the amended section 12 B of the Income Tax Act No. 58 of 1962 stipulates the size of the tax shield available through accelerated depreciation to the commercial tax paying entity.

Photovoltaic solar systems smaller or equal to 1 MW_{p} can be depreciated in one year, granting the commercial tax paying entity a 28% discount on the system. The tax shield applies even if the photovoltaic solar system is installed mid-year or if the system is not new. A repayment time of one year and ongoing electricity savings for the remainder of the system's lifetime can be achieved by financing a portion of the cost of the system. Photovoltaic solar systems greater than 1 MW_{p} are depreciated with the schedule 50%, 30%, and 20% in the first 3 years respectively.

=== Adoption and government conflict of interest ===
Despite this aggressive tax incentive, South African companies are slow to adopt grid-connected photovoltaic solar systems due to the lack of public dialogue from the government concerning photovoltaic solar energy.

The lack of public dialog is partially due to the conflict that arises between the government-owned utility, Eskom, the local renewable energy sector, and international obligations such as the Kyoto Protocol and the Paris Agreement. The state-owned electricity utility Eskom supplies about 95% of South Africa's electricity, of which coal accounted for roughly 82% of generation in 2023. Due to alleged corruption and mismanagement of funds in the years leading up to 2017, Eskom has raised tariffs substantially over the years. Despite repeated tariff increases, Eskom remains in poor financial health, mired in billions of dollars of debt; municipal debt owed to the utility exceeded R107 billion (about US$6 billion) in early 2024. The utility has stated that the increase in renewable energy generation directly impacts its revenue stream, which makes it difficult for it to meet its debt obligations. A government bailout has not been ruled out. The utility, relying mainly on coal-fired power stations also fears that renewable energy generation will directly impact coal jobs.

Through its holding in Eskom, the South African government is dependent on Eskom's revenue stream to avoid a bailout with public funds.

Worsening rolling blackouts have prompted solar company Scatec to explore bypassing Eskom and selling directly to industrial customers.

== Municipal programs ==
In addition to the government tax incentive for photovoltaic solar energy generation, certain municipalities have further incentives for residential and commercial customers, such as a feed-in tariff or net metering.

Incentive programs in metropolitan municipalities
Metropolitan municipality	Seat	Type	Notes	Link
City of Johannesburg	Johannesburg	Feed-in tariff	Embedded generation ≤1 MW; Residential: R0.4279/kWh; Commercial: R0.3614/kWh	City Power
City of Cape Town	Cape Town	Feed-in tariff	Small-scale embedded generation ≤1 MW; Residential: R0.7008/kWh; Commercial: R0.7008/kWh	City of Cape Town; Tariffs 2016/2017
eThekwini	Durban	Feed-in tariff	Residential embedded generation Single phase: ≤2.6 kW; Three phase: ≤13.8 kW; Residential: R0.68/kWh	Ethekwini Municipality; Tariffs 2016/2017
Ekurhuleni	Germiston	Feed-in tariff	Grid-parallel photovoltaic solar systems are allowed	City of Ekhuruleni Tariffs 2025/2026
Tshwane	Pretoria	n/a	Currently no incentive program; Grid-parallel photovoltaic solar systems are allowed	City of Tshwane
Nelson Mandela Bay	Port Elizabeth	Net metering	Small-scale embedded generation ≤1 MW; Residential: 100% of electricity cost Minimum cost: R0.00; Up to 1 year credit when monthly generation exceeds consumption	Nelson Mandela Bay SSEG application Net metering information Policy explanation
Buffalo City	East London	n/a	Currently no incentive program; Grid-parallel photovoltaic solar systems are allowed	Buffalo City Metropolitan Municipality tariffs
Mangaung	Bloemfontein	n/a	Currently no incentive program; Grid-parallel photovoltaic solar systems are allowed	Mangaung Metropolitan Municipality

== Operational and projected plants ==
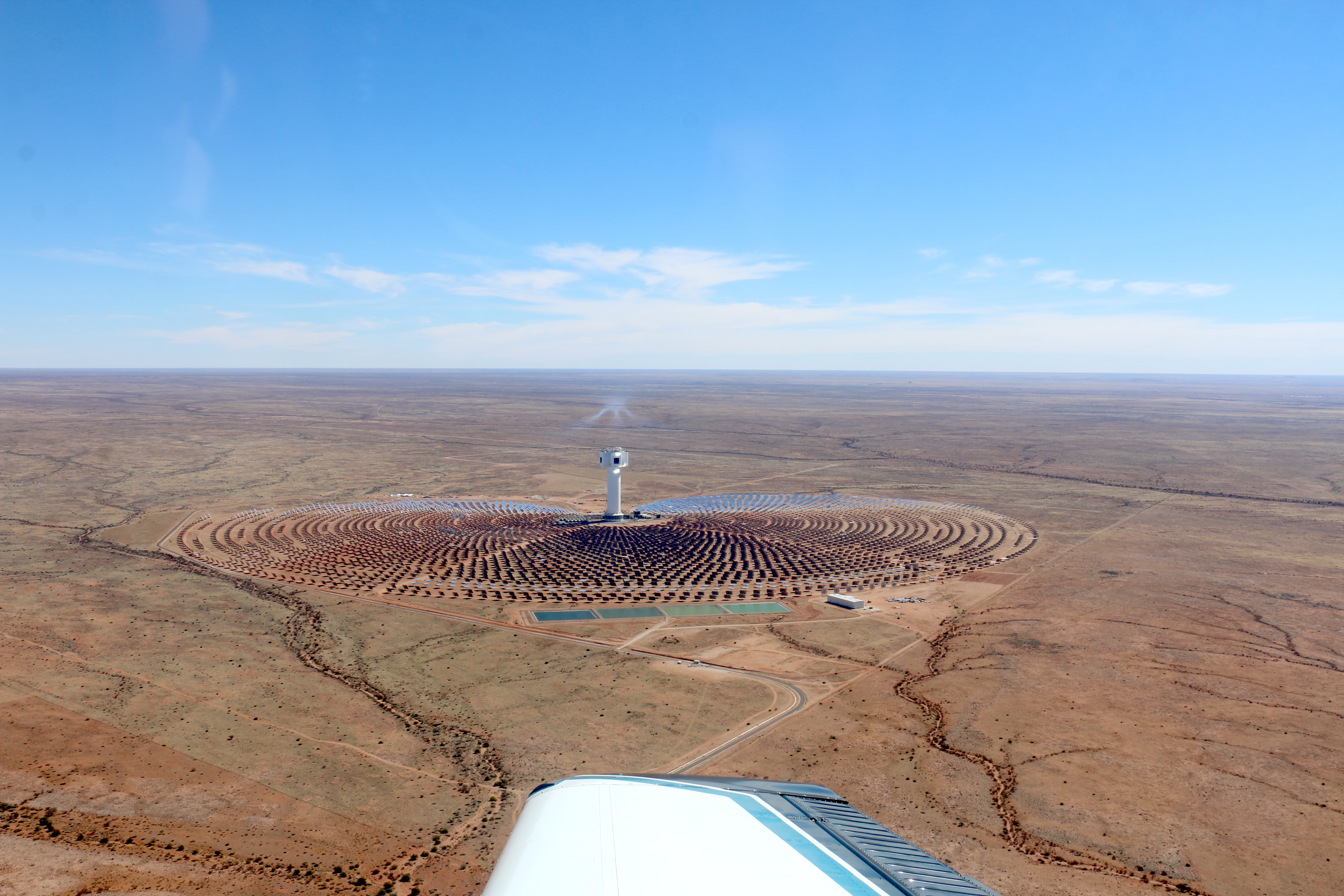
Bird's eye view of Khi Solar One (October 2016). Focusing light above the tower.

The 50 MW Touwsrivier CPV Solar Project concentrated photovoltaics (CPV) power plant was constructed in Touwsrivier, in Western Cape, South Africa in December 2014. A 75 MW solar power plant started production on September 13, 2013 in Kalkbult, in the Northern Cape (implemented by Scatec).

Two other PV plants were completed by the same company in 2014. These are located at Linde in the Northern Cape and Dreunberg in the Eastern Cape, both sun drenched regions boasting some of the best conditions for solar power in the world. Altogether, these three plants provide power for around 90,000 South African households.

Sonnedix and Juwi have announced that they will construct an 86 MW solar photovoltaic (PV) plant in the Northern Cape province. The Mulilo Sonnedix plant in Prieska plant will be larger than any PV plant currently on line in the African continent, and was awarded through the third round of the South Africa's Renewable Energy Independent Power Producer Procurement Programme (REIPPPP). Financial close on the project was targeted for July 2014, with commissioning planned for the second half of 2016.

Iberdrola completed the Jasper Solar Energy Project solar photovoltaic (PV) power plant at 96 MW. It was carried out in a desert area with extreme temperatures and involved the installation of over 325,000 PV modules. This PV plant is located in Northern Cape province in a remote, semi-desert location. It covers a surface area equivalent to 205 football pitches.

Acciona has put the Sishen solar photovoltaic (PV) plant into service in December 2014. It has a peak capacity of 94.3 megawatts (MWp) – 74 nominal MW – and is located in Dibeng in the Northern Cape province. Its horizontal tracking structures allow the PV panels to capture more radiation by following the sun's trajectory across the sky. The plant will produce electricity equivalent to the consumption of around 100,000 South African households, or around 420,000 people (2011 South African household size = 3.6 persons).

As of January 2015 a total of 593 MW produced from PV plants were connected to the grid.

A consortium led by ACWA Power International (Saudi Arabia) has completed commissioning of a 50 MW concentrating solar power (CSP) project in South Africa's Northern Cape in Dec-2015. The Bokpoort CSP project includes 9.3 hours of thermal energy storage, which will allow it to meet demand during peak hours between 5 and 9 PM. ACWA describes this system as the largest thermal storage system ever built for a CSP plant of its size and capacity. The South African solar power plant has set a new African record (26 April 2016) for the continuous, round the clock supply of electricity.

Two CSP plants are being built by Abengoa in the Northern Cape. Khi Solar One is a solar tower plant of 50 MW capacity near Upington, and Kaxu Solar One is a parabolic trough plant of 100 MW capacity near Pofadder with storage capability for three hours. Xina Solar One has a total installed capacity of 100 MW, also near Pofadder.

TotalEnergies is currently planning to construct a 216 MW solar plant which would include a 500 MWh battery storage system, both of which are due to be completed in 2025.

== Solar thermal energy ==
As of 2021, the cumulative installed capacity of solar thermal collectors in South Africa reached 1,844 MW, or 2.62 Mm2 (million m2) of sensor. From 2017–2021, this market continued to grow at a rate of around 2% per year. While much of this capacity came from installations in homes and businesses, several major CSP plants have also been installed and connected to the South African grid.

== Residential solar PV ==
South Africa has experienced an increase in the installation of solar PV since 1992. The low electricity tariffs offered by Eskom prior to 2010 has led to a recently rapid installation increase. The shift in installations can be seen across all segments of consumers including industrial, agricultural, commercial and residential. There are predictions that indicate that there would be a continuous decline in the cost of Solar PV well beyond 2020.

The steady decline in solar PV and battery storage costs creates for an increasingly attractive business case to support self ownership with backup intervention and storage in the absence of grid-based power. The statistics for the absorption of solar PV presently can barely be regarded as comprehensive or official considering the fact that they are based on industry estimates.

Installation numbers remain unclear because of the absence of an official or effective Small-Scale Embedded Generation (SSEG2) registration process for low-voltage connected customers. Although the National Energy Regulator of South Africa (NERSA) confirmed that they will be initiating a formal national registration process for SSEG, chances are they may only be fully operational in the next 2 to 3 years.

However, certain municipalities have initiated their own registration processes to allow connection to their distribution grid infrastructure. "The South African Department of Energy (DoE) has recently released Schedule 2 to the Electricity Act of 2006 which revised the licensing and registration requirements for categories of generators. In accordance with these new rules, generators smaller than 1MW are exempted from having to obtain a license but need to be registered with NERSA."

An approximately 285MWP5 (DC) of small scale solar PV (rooftop and ground-mounted) was installed in South Africa as at December 2017 according to the data received from different sources. The total number of installations equates up to 139,556 units. The installation of small to medium scale solar PV leads to a market share percentage of 0.65% of the total national generation capacity of 44.134GW6. "In addition to these grid-based installations, there are 87,150 off-grid systems with a total installed capacity of 14.35MWP."

In 2022, South Africa's shift to solar power was marked by a 24% increase in small-scale solar generating capacity. This growth is evidenced by the import of solar PV panels worth 2.2 billion rand, adding over 500 megawatts of capacity in just the first five months. Predominantly, wealthier individuals have adopted this trend.

Low and middle-income households have partially participated in the growing uptake of solar PV (SSEG) systems in South Africa for reasons pertaining to affordability and access to finance. Unlike most other countries where grid-connected solar PV technologies are released to low-income households mostly on full or partial subsidization, PV implementation initiatives of such kind in South Africa are targeted generally toward households lacking electricity.

Middle-income households with average earnings of $351.52 to $703.04 per month have better purchasing power. "They generally have improved security of tenure and greater access to electricity". Middle-income households consume twice as much electricity as low-income households. Although middle-income households earn more than twice the average monthly income of low-middle households, it would yet be difficult for the majority to qualify for the loan necessary to purchase a system.

In 2014, a multinational company by the name JA Solar Holdings which is headquartered in Beijing, China began working with local construction companies in South Africa to provide small-scale rooftop Solar PV systems to the suburbs of several South African cities. These systems were installed on the roof of low-income households. With these JA Solar systems, the house dwellers were able to have access to free electricity from their roofs.

== Statistics ==
PV installed capacity
Year	Capacity (MW)_{p}		Production (GWh)	Ref
Year	Cumulative	Added	Production (GWh)	Ref
2011	1	–	–	
2012	41	40	–	
2013	262	222	67	
2014	1063	801	1075	
2015	1252	189	2136	
2016	1974	722	2842	
2017	2186	212	3095	
2018	2559	372		
2021	4172	1313		
2022	6326	372		
2023	6164	372		
2024	8068			
MWp: megawatt-peak, nominal capacity

PV installed capacity in South Africa (MW)

CSP installed capacity
Year	Capacity (MW)_{p}		Production (GWh)	Ref
Year	Cumulative	Added	Production (GWh)	Ref
2015	100	100	188	
2016	200	100	590	
2017	300	100	676	
2018	400	100		
2022	500			
2023	500			
2024	500			
MWp: megawatt-peak, nominal capacity

== See also ==
- Renewable energy in South Africa
- Department of Energy (South Africa)
- Renewable energy in Africa
- List of countries by renewable electricity production
- List of power stations in South Africa
- Energy in South Africa
- List of renewable energy topics by country and territory
