= Energy in South Africa =

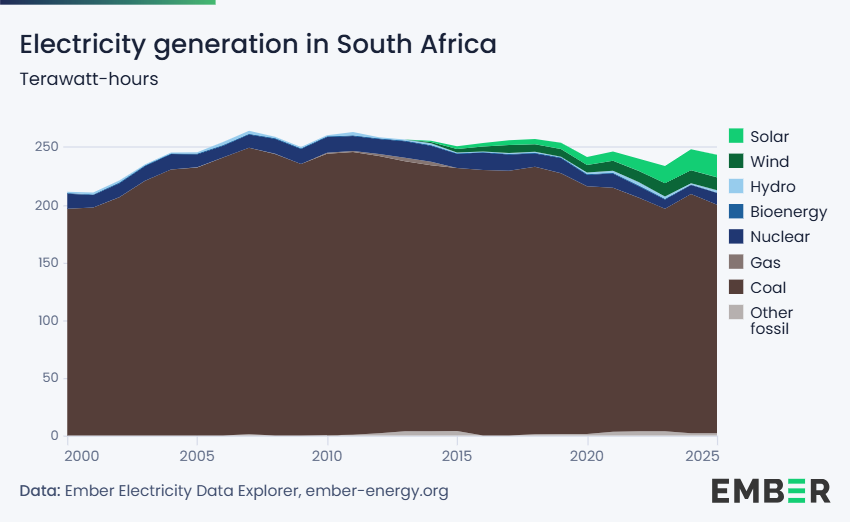
Electricity generation in South Africa in terawatt-hours

South Africa has a large energy sector, being the largest economy in Africa. The country consumed 227 TWh of electricity in 2018.

The vast majority of South Africa's electricity is produced from coal, with the fuel responsible for 88% of production in 2017.

South Africa is the 7th largest coal producer in the world. As of July 2018, South Africa had a coal power generation capacity of 39 gigawatts (GW). South Africa is the world's 14th largest emitter of greenhouse gases.

South Africa is planning to shift away from coal in the electricity sector, and the country produces the most solar and wind energy by terawatt-hours in Africa. The country aims to decommission 34 GW of coal-fired power capacity by 2050.

Through its goals stated in the Integrated Resource Plan, the South African government announced the Renewable Energy Independent Power Producer Procurement Programme, which aims to increase renewable power generation through private sector investment. As a result, numerous companies have started trading platforms for wheeled renewable energy, including Ampli Energy and EXSA, with the aim of more stable pricing and supply, and increased market competition, within the country's energy sector.

South Africa aims to add 105 TW of new renewable energy generation capacity by 2039, under its IRP. In August 2026, at the SA-China Energy Investment Conference, the South African Minister of Electricity and Energy confirmed SA's R2.2 trillion pipeline of renewable and transmission projects. He said it made sense to do business with China, given the country's expertise in renewables production, as well as its BRICS+ membership. The 2039 capacity goal represents 190% more than the SA's 2026 total capacity, across all generation types.

== Overview ==
Energy in South Africa
	Population (million)	Prim. energy (TWh)	Production (TWh)	Export (TWh)	Electricity (TWh)	CO_{2}-emission (Mt)
2004	45.5	1,525	1,814	279	226	343
2007	47.6	1,562	1,856	254	239	346
2008	48.7	1,564	1,895	203	232	337
2009	49.3	1,675	1,868	158	224	369
2010	50.0	1,592	1,889	199	240	347
2012	50.6				237	368
Change 2004-10	9.8%	4.4%	4.1%	-29%	6.0%	1.0%
Mtoe = 11.63 TWh, Prim. energy includes energy losses

== Electricity ==
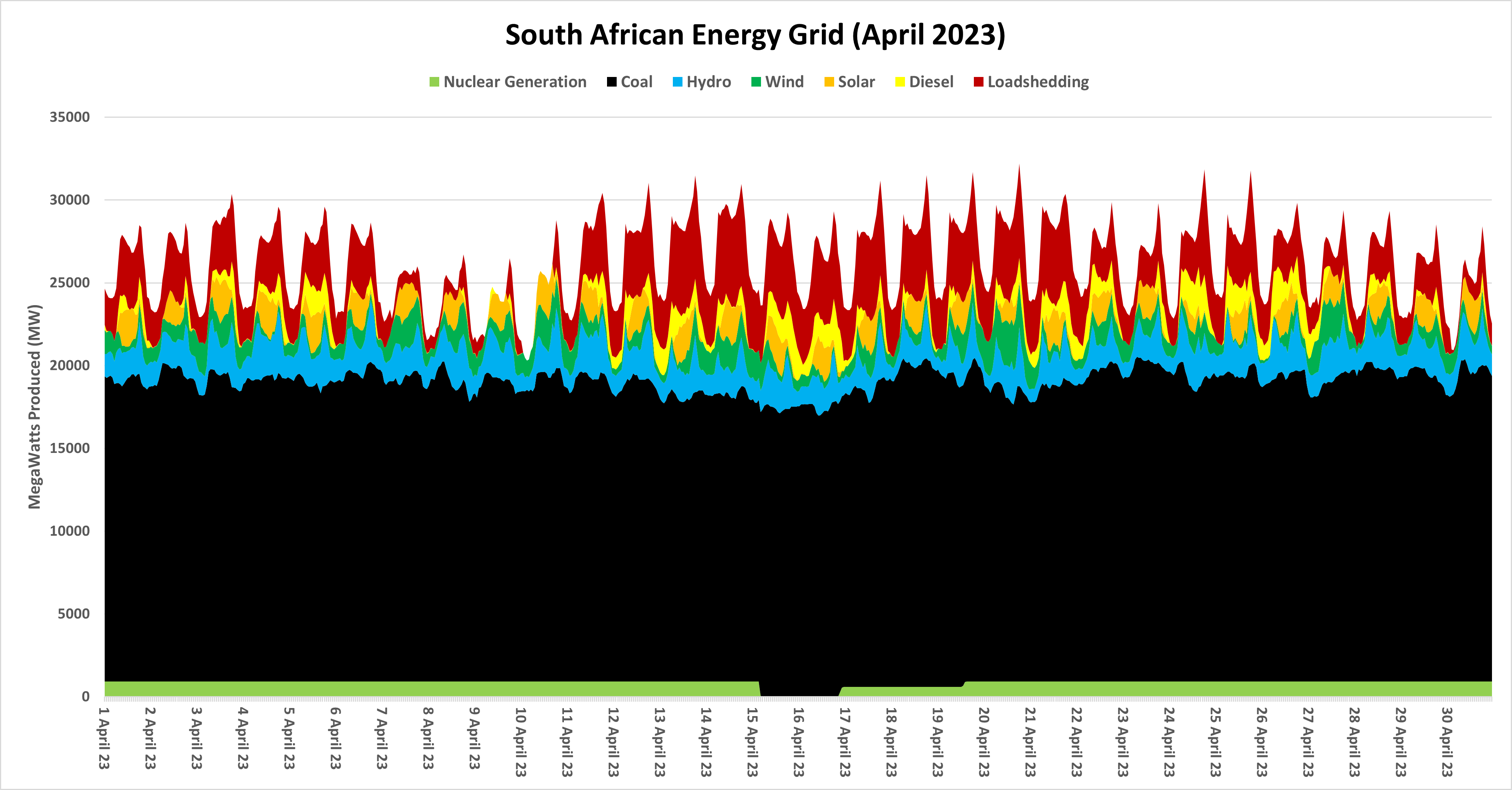
Eskom Nation Grid Production By Source in April 2023

Power Station Maximum Generating Capacity as of 2019
1. Coal (83.0%)
2. Pumped Storage (6.00%)
3. Gas (5.00%)
4. Nuclear (4.00%)
5. Hydro (2.00%)
6. Wind (0.20%)

=== Eskom ===
Eskom is a South African electricity public utility, established in 1923 as the Electricity Supply Commission (ESCOM) and also known by its Afrikaans name Elektrisiteitsvoorsieningskommissie (EVKOM), by the government of the Union of South Africa in terms of the Electricity Act (1922). Eskom represents South Africa in the Southern African Power Pool.

The utility is the largest producer of electricity in Africa, is among the top seven utilities in the world in terms of generation capacity and among the top nine in terms of sales. It is the largest of South Africa's state owned enterprises.

Eskom operates a number of notable power stations, including Kendal Power Station, and Koeberg nuclear power station in the Western Cape Province, the only nuclear power plant in Africa. The company is divided into Generation, Transmission and Distribution divisions and together Eskom generates approximately 95% of electricity used in South Africa.

Eskom's can generate a total nominal capacity of 44GW as at March 2019. Coal fired power stations make up 83% to the nominal capacity mix generated just over 90% of the total energy in 2018. The rest of the energy generated came from a combined contribution by other power stations which accounted for 17% in total nominal capacity.

In 2024, repairs to Eskom's coal-fired power stations resulted in a stable power supply for three consecutive months, reducing solar installations from 97 MW to 26 MW monthly. Imports of photovoltaic cells and modules from China dropped from over $180 million in May 2023 to less than $40 million per month since August 2023.

== Coal ==
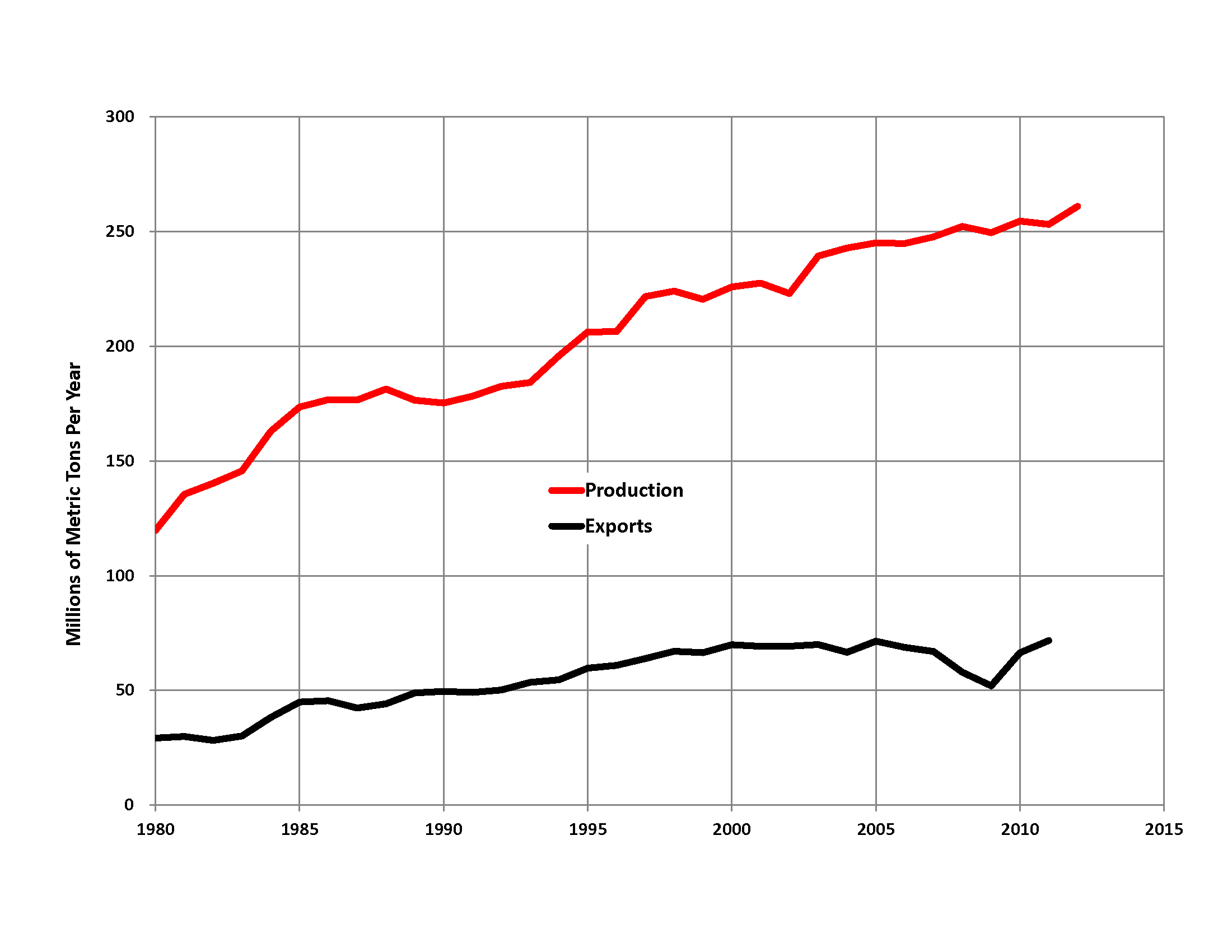
South Africa coal production (red) and exports (black)

South Africa produces in excess of 248 million tonnes of coal and consumes almost three-quarters of that domestically. Around 77% of South Africa's energy needs are directly derived from coal and 92% of coal consumed on the African continent is mined in South Africa.

According to their official website, this is unlikely to change very much in the next few decades, as there is considered to be a "relative lack of suitable alternatives to coal as an energy source." The mining done natively in South Africa is split 51/49 between underground and open-cast mining.

This mining is relatively concentrated; 11 mines account for 70 percent of the output. South Africa is the seventh biggest coal producer as of 2020, producing 248.3 Mt, below Russia 399.8 Mt

Coal production 2011-2023 (Exajoules)
2011	2012	2013	2014	2015	2016	2017	2018	2019	2020	2021	2022	2023
6.00	6.14	6.08	6.20	5.96	6.01	5.97	6.01	6.02	5.82	5.55	5.44	5.41

=== Coal and Environment ===
South African Reserves by Coalfields
1. Highveld (31.0%)
2. Witbank (30.0%)
3. Ermelo (13.8%)
4. Waterberg (11.0%)
5. Vrg. -Sasolburg (6.00%)
6. South Rand (2.00%)
7. Utrecht (2.00%)
8. Klipriver (1.90%)
9. Soutpansberg (1.00%)
10. Other (1.30%)

The largest coal deposits in South Africa are to be found in the Ecca deposits, a stratum of the Karoo Supergroup, dating from the Permian period, between 280 and 250 Ma. The Ecca Group is extensive, covering around two-thirds of South Africa (much of it covered by slightly younger rocks).

Only the northern and north-eastern portion of these Ecca deposits is coal-bearing, but it nevertheless contains more than a third of all coal reserves in the Southern Hemisphere.

Coal production and use in South Africa creates coal combustion wastes (CCW), coal mine wastes (AMD), and toxic coal land fires. CCW contain toxic substances like arsenic, cadmium, chromium and lead.

Hundreds of South African old coal mines are filled with sulphate salts, heavy metals and carcinogenic substances like benzene and toluene. This AMD damages wildlife and spreads illness and disease. According to Greenpeace most shockingly is eMalahleni 'place of coal', Mpumalanga province, surrounded by 22 collieries and steel, vanadium and manganese plants.

One of the largest old mines is the Transvaal and Delagoa Bay (T&DB) mine, closed in 1953. 60 km downstream from Emalahleni AMD leaked into the water supply in 2006 and 2007 killing thousands of fish, crocodiles and freshwater turtles and poisoning the water used by communities. Coal fires continue in the disused mines.

=== Coal Business ===
The five largest coal mining companies account for around 85% of all production. They are Anglo American plc, South32's South Africa Energy Coal, Sasol Mining, Glencore Xstrata, and Exxaro.

Open-pit mining account for roughly half of South African coal mining operations, the other half being sub-surface.

=== Coalfields in South Africa ===
- Ermelo Coalfield
- Highveld Coalfield
- Klip River Coalfield
- Utrecht Coalfield
- Waterberg Coalfield
- Witbank Coalfield

== Renewable energy ==
The portion of renewable energy as a percentage of final energy consumption in 2012 was 16.9%. Most of that was from the burning of traditional biofuels for heating.

6.6% of electricity produced in South Africa in 2018 came from renewables (wind power, hydropower and solar power; biofuels did not contribute much to electricity production).

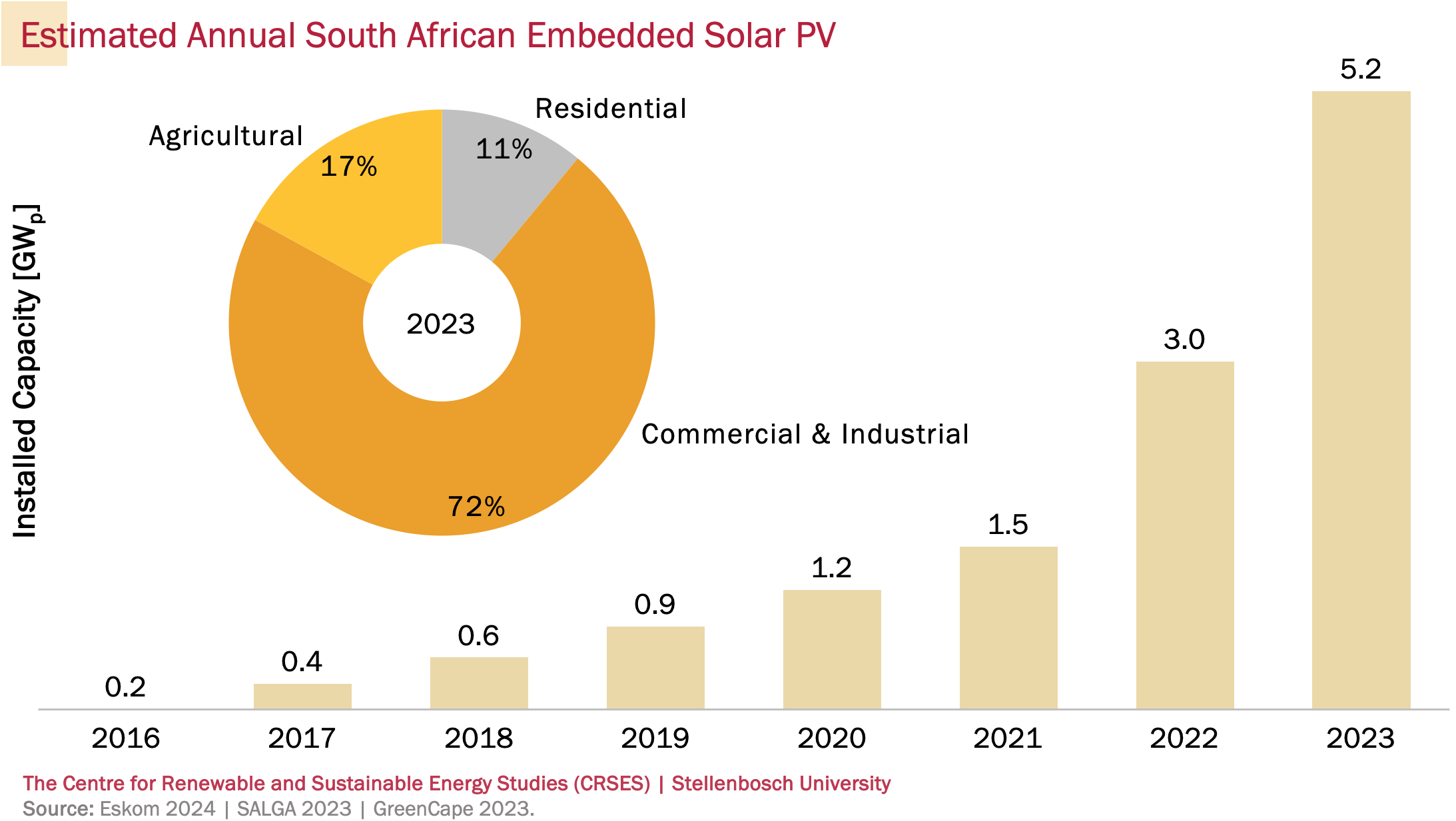
Estimated annual South African embedded solar PV 2016-2023

In terms of share of GDP in 2012, South Africa was the fourth largest investor in renewable power in the world after Uruguay, Mauritius and Costa Rica. That rate of investment is expected to continue. Renewable energy will play a larger role in future.

South Africa's per capita greenhouse gas emissions are the highest in Africa.

South Africa's commitment to renewable energy lags behind that of China, India, Brazil, and Russia. South Africa receives more than twice as much sunshine than Germany, where over 15 percent of the national electricity supply comes from renewable sources.

The Renewable Energy Independent Power Producer Procurement Programme (REIPPPP) is an initiative by the South African government, laid out by the Integrated Resource Plan that is aimed at increasing electricity generation through private sector investment in solar photovoltaic and concentrated solar, wind, small hydro (<40 MW), landfill gas, biomass, and biogas.

=== Government incentives ===
"South Africa's National Energy Regulator (NERSA) announced 31 March 2009 the introduction of a system of feed-in tariffs designed to produce 10 TWh of electricity per year by 2013.

The feed-in tariffs announced were substantially higher than those in NERSA's original proposal. The tariffs, differentiated by technology, will be paid for a period of 20 years.

NERSA said in its release that the tariffs were based, as in most European countries, on the cost of generation plus a reasonable profit. The tariffs for wind energy and concentrating solar power are among the most attractive worldwide.

The tariff for wind energy, 1.25 ZAR/kWh (€0.104/kWh) is greater than that offered in Germany and more than that proposed in Ontario, Canada.

The tariff for concentrating solar, 2.10 ZAR/kWh, is less than that in Spain, but offers great promise in the bright sunlight of South Africa. NERSA's revised program followed extensive public consultation.

Stefan Gsänger, Secretary General of the World Wind Energy Association said in a release that "South Africa is the first African country to introduce a feed-in tariff for wind energy. Many small and big investors will now be able to contribute to the take-off of the wind industry in the country. Such decentralised investment will enable South Africa to overcome its current energy crisis.

It will also help many South African communities to invest in wind farms and generate electricity, new jobs and new income. We are especially pleased as this decision comes shortly after the first North American feed-in law has been proposed by the Government of the Canadian Province of Ontario".

However, the feed-in tariff was abandoned before being promulgated in favor of a competitive bidding process launched on 3 August 2011. Under this bidding process, the South African government plans to procure 3,750 MW of renewable energy: 1,850 MW of onshore wind, 1,450 MW of solar PV, 200 MW of CSP, 75 MW of small hydro, 25 MW of landfill gas, 12.5 MW of biogas, 12.5 MW of biomass, and 100 MW of small projects. The bidding process comprises two steps:

- Qualification phase. Projects are assessed based on structure of the project, legal, land acquisition and use, financial, environmental consent, technical, economic development and bid guarantee
- Evaluation phase. Compliant bids are then evaluated based on: (1) price relative to a ceiling provided in bid documentation, accounting for 70% of the decision, and (2) economic development, accounting for 30% of the decision.

The first round of bids was due on 4 November 2011. The SA government is expected to announce preferred bidders before COP17 in December. PPA's are expected to be in place by June 2012. Projects should be commissioned by June 2014, except CSP projects which are expected by June 2015.

The average indexed bid prices (2012) for the supply of energy in the first bid window for the various renewable energy technologies were:

- Concentrating solar power (CSP): R2,69 per kWh
- Solar photo-voltaic (PV): R2,76 per kWh
- Wind: R1,14 per kWh

The average indexed bid prices (2012) for the supply of energy in the second bid window

- Concentrating solar power (CSP): R2,51 per kWh
- Solar photo-voltaic (PV): R1,65 per kWh
- Wind: R0,90 per kWh
- Small hydro: R1,03 per kWh

The average indexed bid prices (2013) for the supply of energy in the third bid window

- Concentrating solar power (CSP): R1,64 per kWh
- Solar photo-voltaic (PV): R0,99 per kWh
- Wind: R0,74 per kWh
- Landfill gas: R0,94 per kWh
- Biomass: R1,39 per kWh

Eskom claims a standard electricity production price (2012)of R0.31 per kWh (Eskom-predominately Coal and Nuclear), however energy generated from Eskom's new coal power plants have been estimated to be R0.97 per kWh.

== Nuclear power ==
Koeberg nuclear power station accounted for 4.5% of the country's electricity production in 2018. It has two pressurized water reactors based on a French design and rated at 0.93 GW net power each (1.86 GW in total). It is the only commercial nuclear powerplant in the African continent.

Nuclear energy consumption 2011-2021 (Exajoules)
2011	2012	2013	2014	2015	2016	2017	2018	2019	2020	2021
0.12	0.12	0.13	0.13	0.11	0.14	0.13	0.11	0.12	0.13	0.09

== Controversies ==
Secret price contracts between Eskom and the Australian mining company BHP Billiton less than half Eskom's reported production price in the period.

Many abandoned mines have been burning since the 1940s. Persistent and toxic mine chemical leakages pollute waterways and kill animals. In 2006, about 80% of South Africa's coal exports were to Europe.

== Government policies ==
=== Carbon tax ===
South Africa Finance Minister Pravin Gordhan first announced a carbon tax in 2010 that was to begin in 2015. After numerous delays, the tax was finally passed in 2019 and is due to come into effect in 2022. The tax is set at a base rate R120 (US$8.12) per tonne of CO_{2} equivalent, with an effective rate of R6–48 (US$0.42–3.32) after accounting for tax breaks.

The National Treasury has proposed to increase the carbon tax rate by a minimum of US$1 from 2023 to 2025 with gradual increment to US$20 (~R350) by 2026 and to US$30 (~R530) by 2030.

== See also ==
- Climate change in South Africa
- Solar energy in South Africa
- Feed-in tariff
