= Renewable Energy Independent Power Producer Procurement Programme =

South African government electricity generation initiative

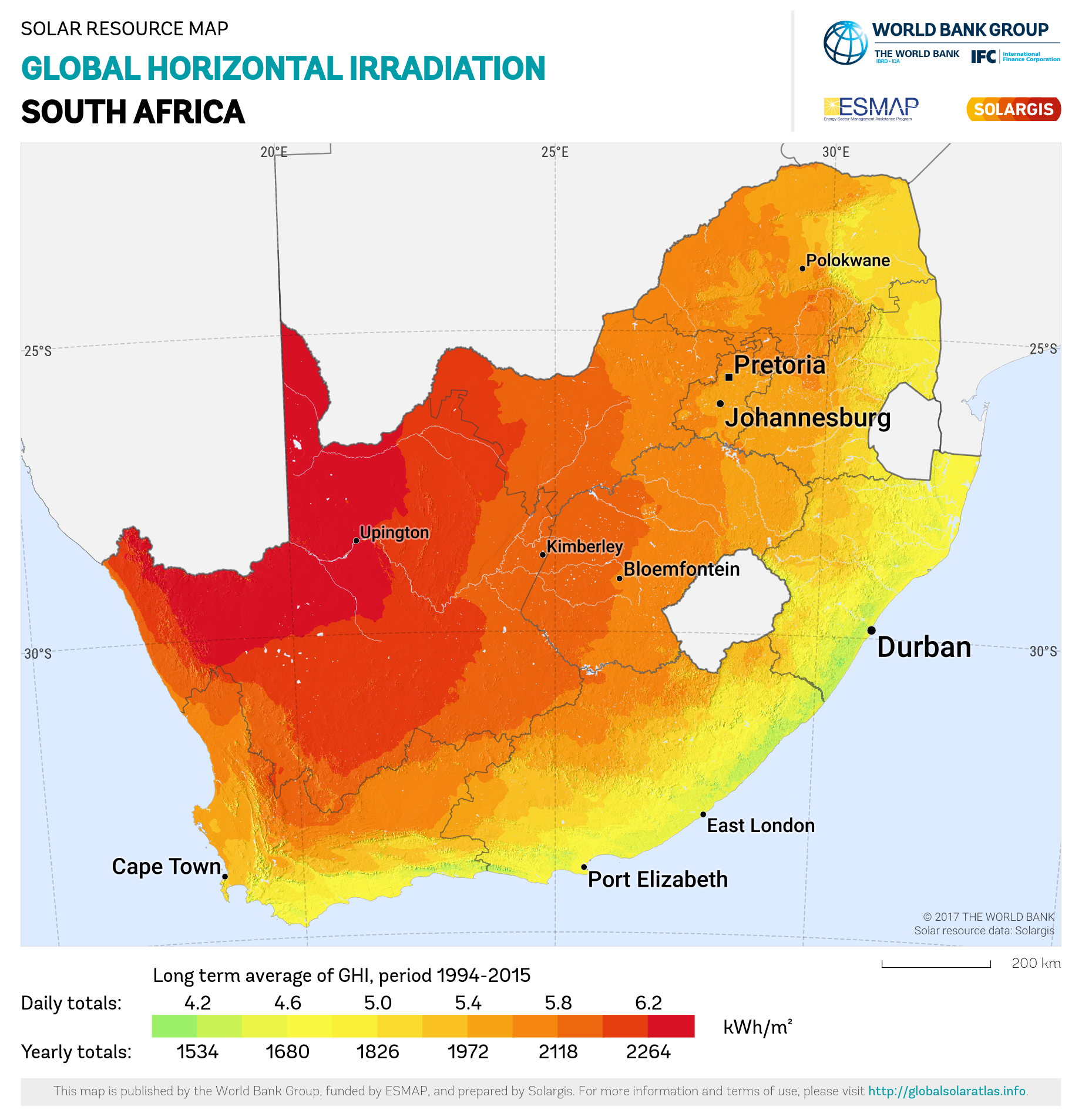
Solar potential of South Africa

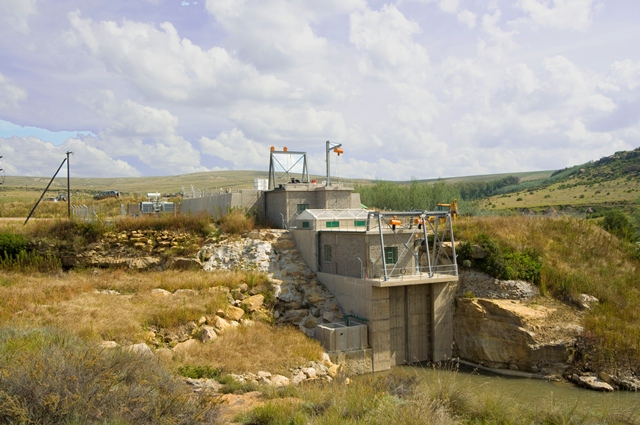
4 MW Merino run-of-the-river power plant on the As River, outputting 25GWh/annum

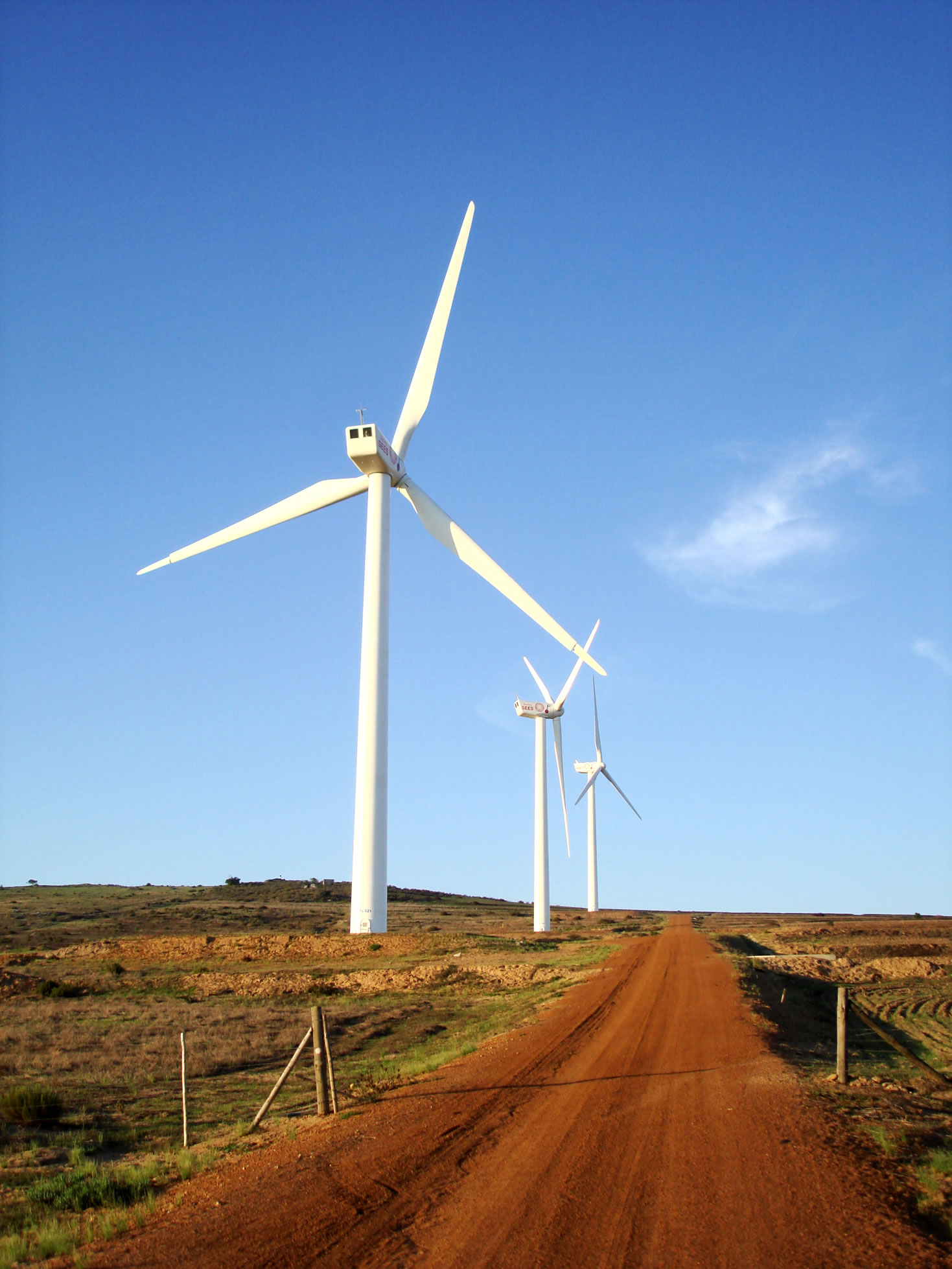
Darling Wind Farm

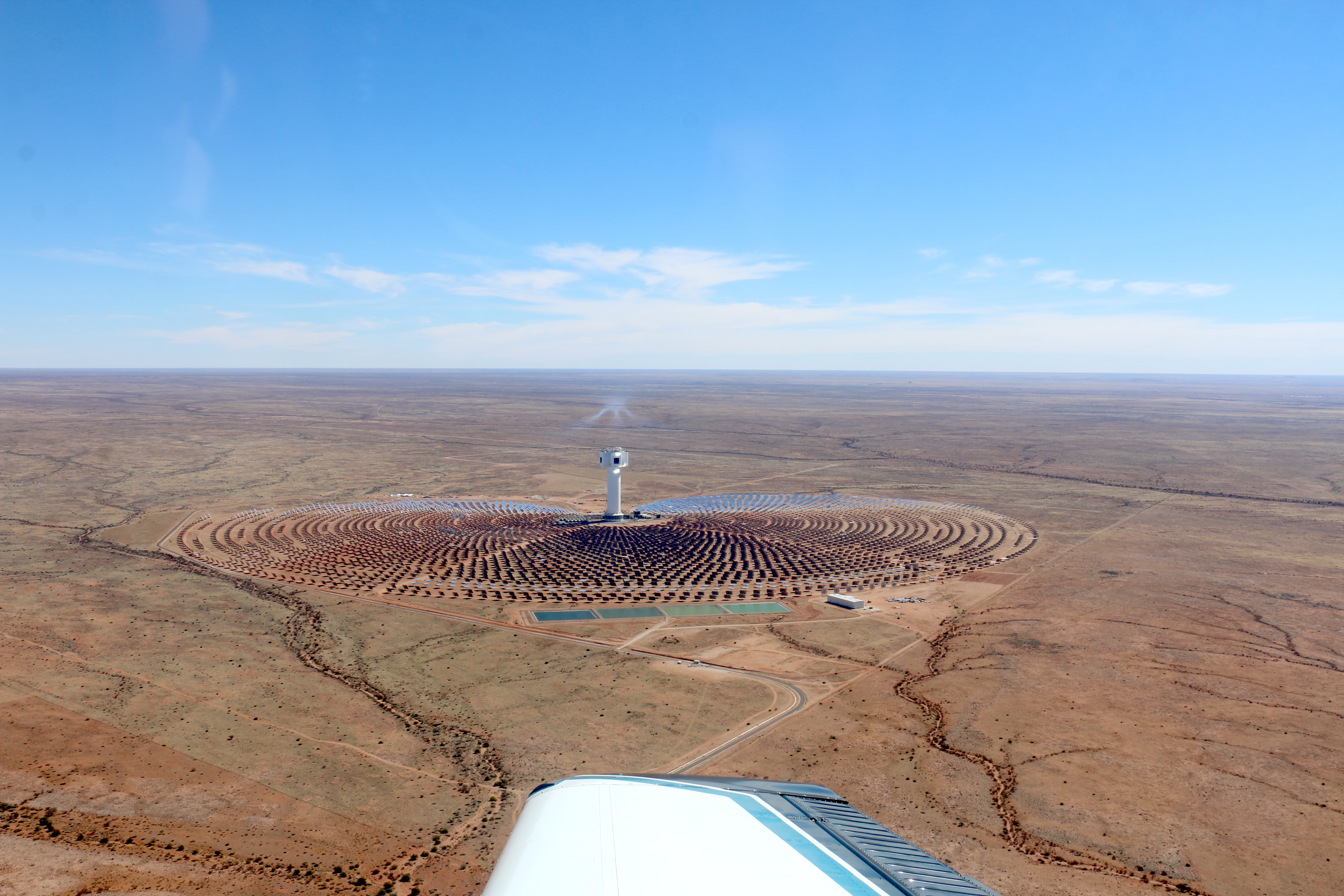
Khi Solar One, a solar power tower in Upington in the Northern Cape. It has a planned annual net output of 180 GWh.

The Renewable Energy Independent Power Producer Procurement Programme (REIPPPP or REI4P) is an initiative by the South African government aimed at increasing electricity capacity through private sector investment in solar photovoltaic and concentrated solar, onshore wind power, small hydro, landfill gas, biomass, and biogas.

The program supports the commitments made by South Africa under the Paris Agreement of 2016.

As of August 2026, a total of 127 private sector projects have been allocated to bidders, across seven bid windows. Out of a total available procurement figure of 21,478MW, the projects are set to fulfil 9,910.37MW of new renewable power generation.

== History ==
At the 2011 United Nations Climate Change Conference (COP17) in Durban, the Renewable Energy Independent Power Producer Programme (REIPPP) was introduced to implement the objectives of the Integrated Resource Plan (IRP 2010-2030); of which are to diversify the country's energy mix away from fossil-fired power generation like coal and crude oil, add 30 GW to the grid before 2030, take advantage of opportunities relating to a Green Economy, and in creating new green industries with at least 300 000 jobs.

Following the Stage 6 load shedding crisis in June 2022, President Ramaphosa announced that Bid Window 6 will double the amount procured from 2,600 MW to 5,200 MW, with 3,200MW allocated for wind and 1000 MW for Solar PV. The National Planning Commission also proposed the 100 MW ceiling of private generation be removed. It said solar and wind power projects can bring online 10 000 MW of capacity within 2–3 years.

In 2023, in an affidavit by outgoing Eskom CEO, André De Ruyter said former Eskom CEOs Brian Molefe and Matshela Koko refused to conclude agreements with Renewable Energy Independent Power Producers, thus exacerbating load shedding. It was estimated that up to 96% of load shedding would have been avoided had they not halted the REIPPPP.

According to analysts, the REIPPPP was two to three years behind schedule. This was due to the program being halted between 2015 and 2019, the Minister of Mineral Resources and Energy Gwede Mantashe not following the outline of the IRP, and the grid network not adequately developed in areas where renewable energy is best harnessed (the Cape Provinces).

Also in 2023, the Development Bank of Southern Africa tendered for the program to be reviewed in terms of its cost and efficacy.

== Major IPPs ==
As of 2026, there are numerous major players in the independent renewable power production sector, many of whom are bidding for REIPPPP projects. Most of these companies are headquartered in Cape Town, a regional hub for renewable energy. The companies include:

- SOLA Group
- Red Rocket Energy
- Anthem
- Mulilo
- Phelan Green Energy
- Enel Green Power
- Pele Green Energy
- EDF Renewables
- Mainstream
- ENGIE South Africa

== Bid window allocations ==
The REIPPPP operates through bid windows, where the national government allocates a certain amount of energy to procure within that window, and interested companies submit competitive tenders for self-funded projects. After review, some are then accepted as preferred bidders.

As of mid-2026, a total of seven bid windows have been opened. These are shown in the table below.

Bid Window	Year	Available for procurement (MW)	Allocated (MW)	Number of Preferred Bidders chosen	Notes
One	2011	3,725MW	1,425.34MW	30	2 allocated for Concentrated Solar Power (CSP) (150MW); 8 for Wind (648.53MW); 20 Solar PV (626.81MW). 2,209MW was available for the next windows.
Two	2012	1,275MW	1,040.96	19	1 project with CSP (50MW); 7 Onshore wind (559.44MW); 9 Solar PV (417.12MW), 2 Small Hydro (14.40MW).
Three	2013	1,473MW	1,456.56MW	19	The allocated projects were: 6 Solar PV (435MW); 9 Onshore wind (787MW); 2 CSP (200MW); 1 Landfill Gas (18MW); 1 Biomass project (16MW).
Three (extended)	2014	200MW	200MW	2	2 CSP projects were allocated, each with a 100MW capacity. The first, Kathu Solar Park, began construction in 2016. The other is Redstone Solar Thermal Power.
Four	2018	2,205MW	2,204.51MW	26	Minister of Energy Tina Joemat-Pettersson, announced that Bid Window 4 will be extended by a further 1,800 MW to reconsider unsuccessful project bids from windows 1 to 4. 1 Biomass, 12 Onshore wind, 12 Solar PV and 1 Hydro project was allocated.
Five	2021	2,600MW	2,583MW	25	12 Onshore wind (1,600MW) and 13 Solar PV (1,000MW) projects were allocated on 28 October 2021. The weighted average price of the Preferred Bidder projects, i.e. both Wind and Solar PV, was R473 (US$32) per MWh. Bid Window 5 will inject a total private sector investment of R50 billion (US$3.38 billion) into the economy, with 13,900 job opportunities.
Six	2022	5,200MW	1,000MW	6	Initially, capacity was increased from 2,600MW to 4,200MW. This was then increased to 5,200MW. At the end of the bid window, 5 Solar PV (1,000MW) projects were announced and 860 MW allocated, for a total investment of R12.1 billion. Onshore wind applications, totalling 4,116 MW were received, but none could be allocated since Eskom could not connect them to the grid. An additional Solar PV project was announced on 23 March 2023.
Seven	2024	5,000MW	1,760MW	8	3,200MW was allocated for wind, and 1,800MW for Solar PV.
Eight	TBD	5,616MW	TBD	TBD	Upcoming. This will be the final bid window under the national government's IRP 2019. Bid window 8 was intended to be opened in 2024, but experienced delays. These were due to bid window 7 taking longer than expected, and the government wanting to develop a new procurement model for window 8, to address grid capacity constraints, and incorporate lessons from previous procurement rounds.
Total	—	21,478MW	9,910.37MW	127	—

== See also ==
- Renewable energy in South Africa
- Solar power in South Africa
- National Transmission Company of South Africa
- Battery Energy Storage Independent Power Producer Procurement Programme
