= National Energy Regulator of South Africa =

Regulatory authority for the electricity supply industry in South Africa

Agency overview
- Formed: 2005; 21 years ago
- Jurisdiction: South Africa
- Headquarters: Kulawula House, 526 Madiba Street, Arcadia, Pretoria
- Agency executives: Thembani Bukula, Chairperson; Nomalanga Sithole, CEO
- Website: nersa.org.za

National Energy Regulator of South Africa (NERSA), is the regulatory authority for the electricity supply industry in South Africa.

== Background ==
National Energy Regulator of South Africa was established to regulate the energy industry in South Africa and to follow government standards, laws, policies and international best practices in support of sustainable development. It was established by the section 3 of the National Energy Regulator Act, 2004 (Act No. 40 of 2004). NERSA's mandate is to regulate the electricity, piped-gas and petroleum pipelines industries in terms of the 2001 Gas Act, Petroleum Pipelines act of 2003 and the Electricity Regulation Act.

In November 2020, NERSA announced it was approving the procurement of 2,500 megawatts of nuclear power by the Department of Mineral Resources and Energy.

== See also ==
- Petroleum industry in South Africa
