= Science and technology in South Africa =

South Africa has a diverse and developed economy, and has had many significant discoveries and achievements in the fields of science, technology, engineering, and mathematics (STEM), over the years.

The first significant work in astronomy in SA was performed by Nicolas Louis de Lacaille between 1751 and 1753, culminating in the measurement of the arc of the southern meridian and a catalog of almost 10 000 southern stars, later published as Coelum Australe Stelliferum.

The Royal Observatory was established at the Cape of Good Hope in 1820 and opened in 1829. Today, with the main observing site having moved from the Cape of Good Hope to a higher site near Sutherland, it is host to the Southern African Large Telescope as well as numerous other South African and international telescopes.

Notable astronomers who have worked in the country include John Herschel who published Results of astronomical observations made during the years 1834, 5, 6, 7, 8, at the Cape of Good Hope in 1847 and David Gill whose work include the Cape Photographic Durchmusterung.

The Karoo Array Telescope (or MeerKAT) is under construction as a pathfinder for the $2 billion Square Kilometer Array (SKA) project, which will be split between sites in South Africa, Australia and New Zealand. South African students and young professionals are involved in the South African SEDS, Students for the Exploration and Development of Space.

As of 2025, South Africa has a high percentage of female STEM graduates. At just under 50%, the ratio of female-to-male STEM graduates is among the highest in the world.

== Energy ==
Being rich in coal, South Africa has some of the largest coal-fired power stations in the world.

In 1955 Sasol opened the first commercial Coal liquefaction plant.

Commercialization of copper indium gallium sulphur selenide (CIGSSE) thin film solar cell technology was pioneered by Professor Vivian Alberts at the University of Johannesburg.

The South African Solar Challenge is held bi-annually over a distance of 2,500 miles (4,000 km).

As of 2011 the Koeberg Nuclear Power Station is the only commercial nuclear energy station on the African continent.

Kimberley, was the first city in the Southern Hemisphere and in Africa to have electric street lights – first lit on 1 September 1882 .

== Mining ==
South African companies hold a considerable number of high value patents related to mining. 10% of the gross domestic product (GDP) of South Africa is generated by mining companies such as De Beers, Anglo American and others. They also produce over 50,000 jobs nationally. Mafube Coal Mine near Middelburg, Mpumalanga is one of the largest and is operated by Anglo Coal, a division of Anglo American. Since grassroots stages in September 2004, this project's estimated net worth is at ZAR$16 Billion Africa Mining IQ lists along with project history.

BHP, one of the foremost mining companies in South Africa as well as Sasol, Xstrata and PetroSA are also in large-scale operations.

== Nuclear weapons programme ==
During the 1960s and 1980s South Africa had been pursuing research into the development of nuclear weapons as well as biological and chemical weapons. South Africa was able to acquire Uranium from native ore deposits, and used aerodynamic nozzle enrichment techniques to produce weapons-grade Uranium. Six bombs were constructed, with one still under construction before the termination of its nuclear weapons programme. It is alleged that South Africa had been collaborating with Israel to develop nuclear weapons and that it possibly detonated one of its weapons over the Indian Ocean in a nuclear weapons test. South Africa dismantled its nuclear weapons programme in 1989, the first nation in the world to do so, and became a signatory of the Nuclear Non-Proliferation Treaty in 1991.

South Africa continues to use its surplus of Uranium as part of its nuclear energy programme, supplying the Koeberg Nuclear Power Station and SAFARI-1 research reactors.

== Government policy ==
Despite government efforts to encourage entrepreneurship in biotechnology, information technology and other high technology fields, not many notable groundbreaking companies have been founded in South Africa. It is the expressed objective of the government to transition the economy to be more reliant on high technology, based on the realisation that South Africa cannot compete with Far Eastern economies in manufacturing, nor can the republic rely on its mineral wealth in perpetuity.

South Africa was ranked 61st in the Global Innovation Index in 2025.

== Important advances made in South Africa ==
- 1.5 Mya - Earliest evidence of controlled use of fire by humans at Swartkrans
- 1882, 1 September – Kimberley becomes the first city in the Southern Hemisphere and in Africa to have electric street lights.
- 1920 – Hendrik van der Bijl publishes The thermionic vacuum tube and its applications. The standard textbook on the subject of vacuum tubes for more than 20 years.
- 1937 – The 17-D Yellow Fever vaccine is announced by Max Theiler
- 1945 – Council for Scientific and Industrial Research was founded
- 1955 – SASOL produces its first automotive fuel from coal
- 1959 – Trevor Wadley invented the Tellurometer, the first successful microwave distance measurement device.
- 1962 – SANAE I, the first South African Antarctic base is built.
- 1963 – The Dolos was developed in East London
- 1965, 18 March – SAFARI-1, the first nuclear reactor on the African continent, goes critical
- 1967, 3 December – The first successful human-to-human heart transplant was performed by Christiaan Barnard at Groote Schuur Hospital
- 1974 – The first automated pool cleaner, the Kreepy Krauly, was introduced by Ferdinand Chauvier
- 1975 – Development is started on a helmet mounted sight system and the South African Air Force later become the first country to deploy these during combat.
- 1978 – SAR Class 6E1 (No. E1525) sets the narrow gauge land speed record for rail vehicles at 245 km/h (152 mph).
- 1995 – Mark Shuttleworth founded Thawte, an early Internet security company which is now the second largest certificate authority on the internet.
- 1995 – The Natal Sharks Board starts marketing of the Shark POD, a personal device to deter sharks.
- 1999, 23 February – SUNSAT, the first South African produced satellite was put in orbit by an American Delta II launch vehicle.

== Nobel Laureates ==
- 1951, Max Theiler, Nobel Prize in Physiology or Medicine for his work on producing a Yellow fever vaccine
- 1979, Allan McLeod Cormack, Nobel Prize in Physiology or Medicine for pioneering work in X-ray computed tomography
- 1982, Aaron Klug, Nobel Prize in Chemistry For his development of crystallographic electron microscopy and his structural elucidation of biologically important nucleic acid-protein complexes
- 2002, Sydney Brenner, Nobel Prize in Physiology or Medicine for pioneering work in molecular biology

== Objects named after South Africans ==
- Minor planet 5038 Overbeek, discovered 31 May 1948, is named after South African astronomer Michiel Daniel Overbeek.
- Minor planet 23182 Siyaxuza, discovered 23 July 2000 by the Lincoln Near-Earth Asteroid Research team, is named after South African scientist Siyabulela Xuza.

== Research institutes and societies ==
- Academy of Science of South Africa
- African Centre for Genome Technologies
- African Institute for Mathematical Sciences
- Agricultural Research Council (South Africa)
- Astronomical Society of Southern Africa
- Bernard Price Institute for Palaeontological Research
- Council for Scientific and Industrial Research
- Department of Science and Technology (South Africa)
- Engineering Council of South Africa
- National Research Foundation of South Africa
- Onderstepoort Veterinary Academic Hospital
- Operations Research Society of South Africa
- Royal Society of South Africa
- SEDS
- South African AIDS Vaccine Initiative
- South African Bureau of Standards
- South African Institute for Aquatic Biodiversity
- Southern African Institute of Mining and Metallurgy
- South African Journal of Science
- South African Marine Predator Lab
- South African Medical Research Council
- South African National Antarctic Programme
- South African National Bioinformatics Institute
- South African National Space Agency
- Southern African Institute of Steel Construction
- Technology Innovation Agency

== See also ==
Industry

- Communications in South Africa
- Mining industry of South Africa

Military

- Armscor (South Africa)
- Atlas Aircraft Corporation
- Denel

Computing

- Go Open Source
- Ubuntu

Communication

- South African National Research Network (SANReN)
- TENET (network), the Tertiary Education and Research Network of South Africa

Other

- SEDS South Africa
- South African patent system
