= Steven Bosch =

South African artist (born 1978)

- Born: 6 June 1978 (age 48); Johannesburg, Gauteng
- Occupations: Artist and creative consultant

Steven Bosch (born 6 June 1978) is a South African artist (working primarily in the medium of photography, video and ceramics) and creative consultant in Johannesburg. He was also a trend analyst and presenter on the Afrikaans TV program Seiners on ViaTV, a South African lifestyle channel.

== Biography ==
Steven Bosch was born in Johannesburg and grew up in Florida on the West Rand. Bosch completed a B. Business Communication degree at the Potchefstroom University in 2001 and a Masters in Development Communication at the NWU in 2009. From 2004 to 2014 he lectured communications at the NWU in Potchefstroom. He is currently living in Johannesburg.

As an artist, Bosch has participated in several national group exhibitions since 2007. He has artworks in national public art collections, such as the NWU Art Collection as well as private collections locally and abroad.

He received an institutional award for creative excellence from the NWU in 2010 for his Solo exhibition, Stasis.

Bosch was a top 6 winner in the SA Taxi Foundation Art awards 2016.

== Solo exhibitions ==
- 2010 Stasis, Snowflake building, Aardklop National Arts Festival, Potchefstroom.

== Selected group exhibitions ==
- 2019 Oh Mercy: Bob Dylan, Artbox Gallery, Pretoria; Art.Well Gallery, Johannesburg.
- 2019 The Cat Show, David Krut Gallery, Rosebank Johannesburg.
- 2017 I am Free, SAHETI, Johannesburg. (Exhibition in celebration of George Bizos' 90th birthday and in aid of George Bizos Saheti Scholarship and Bursary Fund)
- 2016 SA Taxi Foundation Art Awards finalist exhibition, Lizamore & Associates, Johannesburg.
- 2016 Lords of Winter, Equus Gallery, Cavalli Estate, Stellenbosch.
- 2015 The Games People Play, Aardklop, Botanical Gardens Gallery, NWU. Potchefstroom.
- 2015 Letters to the Past or the Future, Trent Gallery, Pretoria.
- 2014 Showcase 3, Bayliss Gallery, Norwood, Johannesburg.
- 2014 Salon 1, Upstairs at Bamboo, Melville, Johannesburg.
- 2013 Interruptions, University of Johannesburg Art Gallery, Aucklandpark, Johannesburg. (Exhibition in aid of George Bizos Saheti Scholarship and Bursary Fund).
- 2013 Five Photographers, Dawid's Choice Gallery, Sandown Estate, Sandton.
- 2013 Absa L'Atelier finalist exhibition, Absa Towers, Johannesburg.
- 2013 Tom Waits for no man, ABSA KKNK, Oudtshoorn; UJ art gallery; Grande Provence, Franschoek.
- 2013 Reflective Conversations, Die Gallery, North-West, university, Potchefstroom.
- 2012 Dismotief, Potchefstroom City Hall, Aardklop National Arts Festival.
- 2012 SASOL New Signatures, Pretoria Art Museum, Pretoria.
- 2012 Outsider, The Media Mill, Johannesburg.
- 2010 Absa L'Atelier finalist exhibition, Absa Towers, Johannesburg.
- 2010 L'origine du monde, Snowflake Building, Aardklop National Arts Festival, Potchefstroom.
- 2010 Transgressions and the boundaries of the page / Oor die einders van die bladsy, Africana-Room of the University of Stellenbosch's Gericke Library, Woordfees, Stellenbosch; Die Gallery, North-West, university, Potchefstroom, and FADA Gallery, University of Johannesburg, Johannesburg.
- 2009 SASOL New Signatures, Pretoria Art Museum, Pretoria.
- 2009 STREEK, Potchefstroom Museum, Aardklop National Arts Festival, Potchefstroom.
- 2008 SASOL New Signatures, Pretoria Art Museum, Pretoria.
- 2008 STREEK, Potchefstroom Museum, Aardklop National Arts Festival, Potchefstroom.
- 2007 STREEK, Potchefstroom Museum, Aardklop National Arts Festival, Potchefstroom.

== Exhibitions curated ==
- 2012 Dismotief, Potchefstroom City Hall, Aardklop National Arts Festival
