= Nuclear power in South Africa =

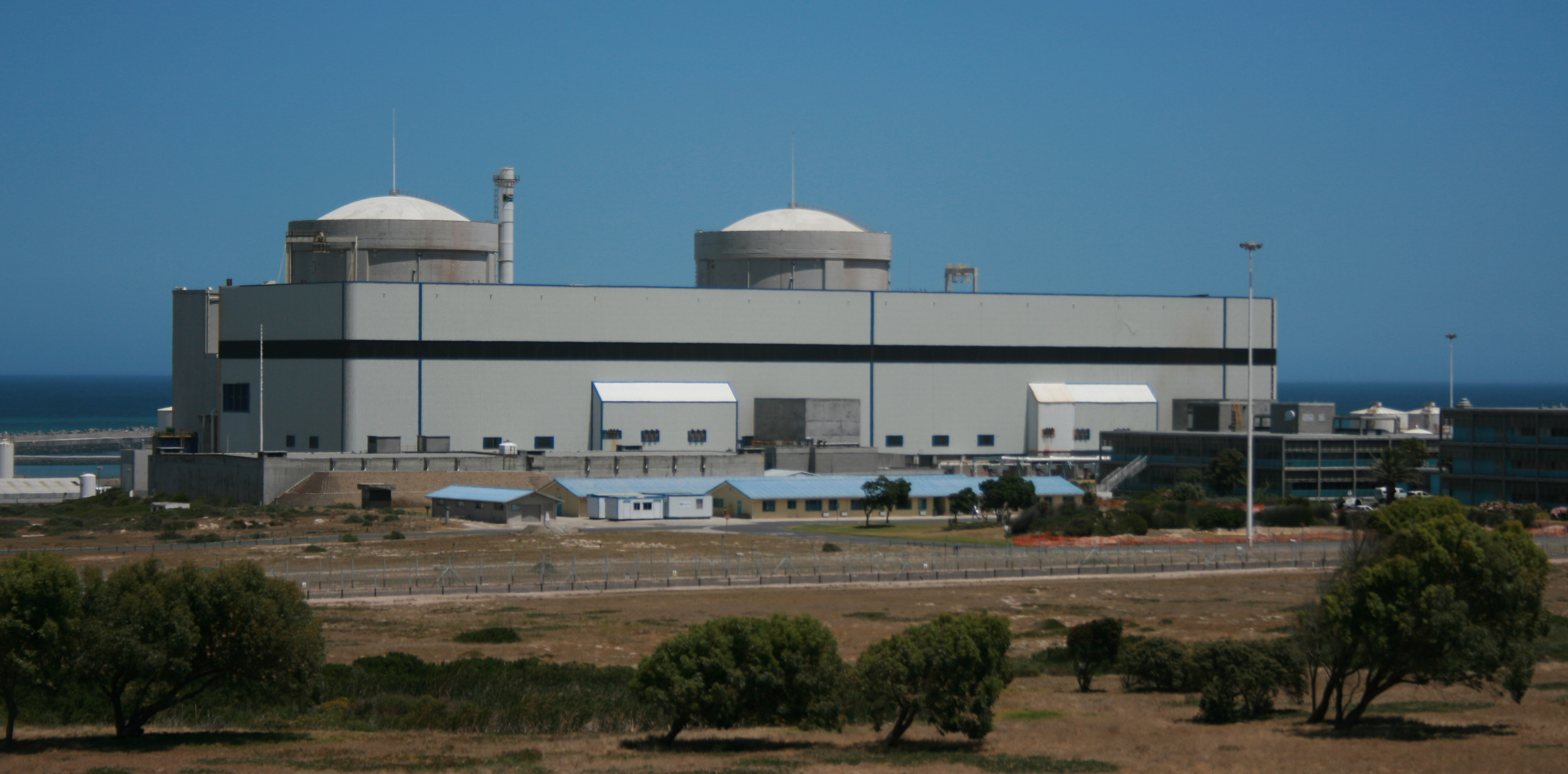
Koeberg Nuclear Power Station

South Africa is the only country in Africa with a commercial nuclear power plant. The nuclear programme of South Africa is now primarily for power, although it has some medical uses and historically some nuclear weapon development.

Two reactors located at the Koeberg nuclear power station account for around 5% of South Africa's electricity production. Spent fuel is disposed of at Vaalputs Radioactive Waste Disposal Facility in the Northern Cape.

The SAFARI-1 tank in pool research reactor is located at the Pelindaba nuclear research centre in Gauteng.

== New build ==
Nuclear power plants in South Africa
Active plants
Sites of potential plants

The 2010 Integrated Resource Plan (IRP) envisaged building 9,600 MWe of new nuclear power capacity by building between six and eight new nuclear reactors by 2030, which would cost about R1 trillion.

In 2016, an updated draft IRP was published which set a much lower and slower nuclear target, due to lower demand projections and increased capital cost. This updated IRP envisaged that the first new nuclear power plant would only need to be online by 2041.

South Africa's 2019 Integrated Resource Plan plans a 20 year life-extension for Koeberg to 2044, and a delayed nuclear new build programme due to the "marginal cost of [nuclear] generation, in comparison to other options" with a scenario that may build new capacity after 2030.

South Africa agreed to cooperate closely with the Russian state nuclear power company Rosatom on the development of new nuclear power plants in South Africa. One project was to cost US$76 billion, but has so far not been realized.

In December 2023, the government announced it would invite nuclear vendor bids for 2500 MW of nuclear energy by 2032.

In August 2024, then–Minister of Energy and Electricity Kgosientsho Ramokgopa announced that the Ministerial Determination for the procurement of 2500 MWe of new nuclear capacity was withdrawn to allow for further public consultation, after legal challenges were made regarding the procedure for seeking public comments.

In May 2025, Minister Ramogkopa stated that South Africa was seeking expertise from around the world to assist in affordably building nuclear capacity for the country, at scale. He further stated that, following studies done by the Nuclear Energy Corporation of South Africa (NECSA), South Africa plans to spend R60 billion on its nuclear build program.

The minister said that the new program must have a capacity of at least 10 GW to be deemed credible by the country’s energy market. He said that the successful bidder would be from France, South Korea, the United States, China, or Russia, once experts had been consulted.

=== Corruption ===
There was little concern about the cost of the endeavour, as well as the probability for corruption, due to the efficiency of transparency in the procurement processes and the regard of civic society. President at the time Jacob Zuma pushed ahead with plans to secure nuclear power.

Russian President Vladimir Putin and the then South African President Jacob Zuma planned to embezzle billions of dollars from the nuclear power plant deal involving Russia’s state-owned company Rosatom. Former President Jacob Zuma sacked Finance Minister Pravin Gordhan for blowing the whistle about corruption.

==== Legality ====
Following the Public Protector's "State of Capture" report, which implicated him and Jacob Zuma in the peddling of state patronage, Brian Molefe resigned from his position as executive chief of Eskom on 1 January 2017. However, analysts noted that corruption at Eskom was deep-rooted and that Molefe's resignation would not resolve the nuclear question. In April 2017, Eskom requested that the Treasury department waive procurement regulations for the new nuclear plants, claiming that Eskom "had done a lot of the work prior" and that these efforts were adequate. The Democratic Alliance objected on the grounds that this would embark the state on its "single biggest public procurement without fully assessing associated risks and consequences for SA’s economy".

On 26 April 2017, following a legal application by Earthlife Africa and the Southern African Faith Communities Environment Institute, the Western Cape High Court declared that the South African government's new nuclear procurement processes had been unlawful because they had not followed due processes. The court noted that the National Energy Regulator, Parliament, and the Energy Minister must all be involved in the process. All of the subsequent existing contracts with Russia, the US, and South Korea were therefore found to be void.

==== Costs ====
The R1 trillion cost of the proposed new nuclear project played a part in ratings downgrades by international credit ratings agencies.

Finance Minister Pravin Gordhan, who opposed new nuclear installations on the grounds of the steep cost, was replaced by Malusi Gigaba in March 2017. Gigaba is responsible for filling the vacancy of chief procurement officer at the Treasury, which would make decisions about procurement processes regarding the new nuclear project.

== Life extension of Koeberg ==
In January 2018, Eskom's acting Chief Financial Officer stated that the company cannot afford a new nuclear build, following a 34% drop in interim profits due to declining sales and increasing financing costs. The government stated it will proceed with the plan but more slowly. The draft 2018 IRP does not call for new nuclear power, partly due to declining electricity demand, forecast 30% lower than in the previous IRP.

South Africa's 2019 Integrated Resource Plan plans a 20 year life-extension for Koeberg to 2044, and a delayed nuclear new build programme due to the "marginal cost of [nuclear] generation, in comparison to other options" with a scenario that may build new capacity after 2030. Small modular reactors may become an attractive option, dependent on earlier demonstration elsewhere in the world.

In July 2024, the month Unit 1's license to operate was set to expire, South Africa's National Nuclear Regulator granted Eskom an operating license to operate Unit 1 at Koeberg until July 2044. A decision on Unit 2 was deferred.

On 30 December 2024, Eskom successfully synchronized Unit 2 of the Koeberg nuclear power station in Cape Town to the national grid. The National Nuclear Regulator is expected to decide on the extension of Unit 2’s operational license in 2025.

== Small modular reactors ==
Small modular reactors in the form of the pebble bed reactor design was invested in by the South African government; one such project was the Pebble bed modular reactor (PBMR). The PBMR was a particular design of pebble-bed reactor under development by South African company PBMR (Pty) Ltd since 1994.

In February 2010, the South African government announced that it had stopped funding the development of the pebble bed modular reactor after investing 80% of the R9.24 billion (2010) (equivalent to R14.28 billion or US$1.08 billion in 2018), because of missed deadlines and lack of customers. Personnel from the defunct PBMR took their expertise to X-energy, Ultra Safe Nuclear Corporation and the Pretoria-based Stratek Global.

== Nuclear expertise in South Africa ==
AREVA built the twin units of the Koeberg nuclear power plant. In 2001, AREVA NP bought a 45% stake in LESEDI Nuclear Services, followed by a further 6% stake in 2006. Today Framatome is a majority shareholder in Lesedi Nuclear Services.

In 2016 the IAEA concluded a Long Term Operational Safety Review at South Africa’s Koeberg Nuclear Power Plant. The Pre-SALTO (Safety Aspects of Long Term Operation) review mission was requested by the Government of South Africa's Department of Energy. "A SALTO peer review is a comprehensive safety review addressing strategy and key elements for the safe Long Term Operation of nuclear power plants".

== Education ==
The following South African universities offer courses in nuclear engineering:

- University of the Witwatersrand, Johannesburg
- North-West University, at the Post-graduate School of Nuclear Science and Engineering in Potchefstroom
- University of Cape Town, Cape Town

== Nuclear weapons ==
South Africa built six nuclear bombs in the 1980s, which were subsequently dismantled.

== See also ==
- List of nuclear reactors in South Africa
- Nuclear power stations in South Africa
- South African nuclear program
- South African Nuclear Energy Corporation
