= Rob Adam =

South African scientist

Hon.Prof. Rob Adam BSc(Hons) MSc PhD MASSAf FRSSAf MSAIP
- Born: 13 September 1955 (age 70); South Africa
- Education: UCT, UNISA
- Known for: Work on systems and institutions of science, technology and innovation.
- Awards: Special award from the National Science and Technology Forum in recognition of his contribution to science, engineering and technology during his term as Director General.
- Scientific career
- Fields: Nuclear physics
- Workplaces: DACST, DST, NECSA

Robert Martin Adam (born 13 September 1955) is the director of the Square Kilometer Array (SKA) radio-telescope in South Africa. He used to be the chief-executive officer of the South African Nuclear Energy Corporation (NECSA). and Director General of the South African Department of Science and Technology. He has worked as a consultant to the governments of Namibia and Chile, and is a Fellow of the Royal Society of South Africa.

== Early life ==
Adam's father, James, was a metallurgist, and he grew up in mining towns. He finished school at Bishops, a private school in Cape Town.

== Studies ==
Adam obtained a BSc (Hons) degree with distinction in chemistry and the Percy Gordon Memorial Award for the top honours student from the University of Cape Town in 1978. In 1980, after two years working in carbon fibre technology in England, he returned to South Africa and was employed by the South African Council for Higher Education. His task was to develop distance learning courses in physical science and mathematics in English for people whose first language was not English.

In 1981, Adam was imprisoned for 10 years for activities on behalf of the African National Congress (ANC). While serving his sentence, he obtained BSc (Hons) and MSc degrees in theoretical physics, both with distinction, through the University of South Africa (UNISA). He received the UNISA national scholarship awarded to the top masters student at that university, to do a PhD in theoretical nuclear physics. He was released from prison in 1990 and shortly thereafter received his PhD degree from UNISA. After a short period of working with Professor Harry Fiedeldy, his PhD supervisor, he was awarded a post-doctoral fellowship by the Vrije Universiteit (Amsterdam). He returned in 1993 to take up a post in the Department of Physics at the University of Natal.

== Anti-Apartheid work ==
In 1979, while in London after his initial studies, Adam became a member of the African National Congress (ANC), then banned by the Apartheid regime. After joining the ANC he returned to the country: "What the ANC did for me was give me a way to go home again, in a way that I found acceptable."

On 22 September 1981 Adam and Mandla Elliot Themba of Soweto, a fellow ANC member, was arrested because of their ANC membership and involvement in underground work for the organisation. During the trial they were represented by the legendary human rights advocate, George Bizos, who also represented Nelson Mandela and many other political activists. Adam's father testified in mitigation of sentence that Adam had become aware of the evils of the compound system while the family lived on a mine in Namibia, and that "his strong sense of concern and compassion led him to his ANC commitment." On 1 June 1982 Adam was sentenced to an effective 10 years imprisonment, and Themba to five years.

The Mail & Guardian summarises Adam's experience in prison as follows:

"eight months in solitary confinement, where you grow to miss your interrogators because at least they provide some stimulation; a year with the criminals, who found him somewhat of a novelty; some time getting to know the Italians of a right-wing fascist movement, also incarcerated; and, finally, the years with a small group of political, with whom he spun plans of how they would run the country when they came to power – including what kind of science and technology sector South Africa would have."

While in Pretoria Central Prison, Adam studied further and later obtained his doctoral degree in theoretical nuclear physics. Adam was released on 9 February 1990, together with many other political prisoners as part of the steps towards a democratic South Africa.

== Career in government ==
In 1995 Adam was appointed as a chief director in the former Department of Art, Culture, Science and Technology (DACST). In 1996 he was promoted to the post of Deputy Director-General for science and technology.

In 1999 Adam became the Director General of DACST, under Minister Ben Ngubane. In 2002 this department was split into two, the Department of Art and Culture and the Department of Science and Technology (DST). He continued as the Director General of DST, in the latter period under Minister Mosibudi Mangena. He held this position until 2006, when he took up the position of the CEO of the Nuclear Energy Corporation of South Africa.

While in government Adam was responsible for driving activities such as the drafting of the Green and White Papers on science and technology; the Position Paper on the Information Society; and various statutes including the National Research Foundation Act, the National Advisory Council on Innovation Act, the Legal Deposit and the National Libraries Act and several international technical co-operation frameworks. He managed the Research and Technology Audit; Research and Technology Foresight project; reviews of 12 science, engineering and technology institutions; the restructuring of museums and cultural institutions; the distribution of budgets to science councils; an investigation into South Africa's science journals; and science and technology agreements with more than 22 countries.

Adam worked towards South Africa being awarded the contract to build and run the Square Kilometer Array (SKA) Telescope. South Africa was recently awarded the lion's share of this project in competition with Australia. SKA is a radio telescope and must be based in an area where there is very little man made radio interference. The site chosen in South Africa is in the Karoo, north-west of Carnarvon.

== Career in parastals and private sector ==
Adam was appointed CEO of the South African Nuclear Energy Corporation (NECSA) in 2006. It has its premises at Pelindaba outside Pretoria and is established by legislation to be South Africa's main research and development organisation in the field of nuclear technology, as well as carrying out other functions on nuclear issues on behalf of the South African government. It operates the Safari Research Reactor.

From 2012 to 2014 he was Group Executive: Nuclear at the Aveng Group.

== SKA ==
Adam was appointed as director designate from 1 April to 31 December 2015, and after that as director for a period of five years of the SKA South Africa, replacing Bernie Fanaroff at the end of 2015.

== Family and personal life ==
Adam was married to Liz Gavin and has two children. He is a grand nephew of Sir James Rose-Innes, the second Chief Justice of the Union of South Africa.
