= Vaalputs =

- Location within Northern Cape
- Coordinates: 30°07′53″S 18°34′12″E
- Country: South Africa
- Province: Northern Cape
- Established: 1986
- Founder: NECSA

Area
  - Total: 100 km^{2} (39 sq mi)
- Elevation: 1,000 m (3,300 ft)
- Time zone: SAST

Vaalputs is the only South African radioactive waste-disposal facility, called the Vaalputs Radioactive Waste Disposal Facility, operated by NECSA. The facility is located about 100 km south-east of Springbok, in the Northern Cape. It covers an area of approximately 10,000 hectare, measuring 16,5 km from east to west and 6,5 km from north to south at its narrowest point.

Approximately 1,000 hectare is occupied by sites developed for low- and intermediate-level waste, an interim spent nuclear fuel storage facility, housing, roads, power lines and an airstrip. Vaalputs lies between the Namaqualand in the west and the Bushmanland in the east.

During 1978 a programme to select a suitable site for the disposal of nuclear waste was commenced over large parts of South Africa. The programme leader had to keep a variety of socio-economic and geology related parameters in mind. Pioneer investigations indicated that the Northern Cape was the most feasible area. Supplementary studies showed that a place approximately 100 km southeast of Springbok was ideally suited for the disposal of low- and intermediate-level wastes. In 1983 three farms were acquired by the state on behalf of the NECSA, which now constitute the Vaalputs Radioactive Waste Disposal Facility. The first low- and intermediate-level waste arrived from Koeberg in October 1986.

Initially, silos were envisaged for dry storage of spent fuel from Koeberg. However the spent fuel from Koeberg is stored in reactor pools on the Koeberg site. These pools have been re-racked in order to facilitate lifetime storage of spent fuel. Low and intermediate waste was buried in 10 meter deep trenches, which were filled with compacted soil, whereafter the surface was rehabilitated by planting local flora. In June 1997 it was revealed that some uncovered containers had rusted and were leaking radioactivity. The National Nuclear Regulator (NNR) temporarily suspended operations, until the licensing conditions were met by the operators. The NNR established communication with local communities in September 2003.

== See also ==
- Koeberg Alert
- Koeberg nuclear power station
- NECSA
- Valindaba
