= Duynefontein =

Proposed site for second nuclear power station in Cape Town

Coordinates: 33.667973°S 18.430622°E

Duynefontein in red with the other potential nuclear sites in blue

Duynefontein is an area in Cape Town, near the coast, just south-east of Koeberg Nuclear Power Station.

The area has been identified as a possible future nuclear reactor site by South African electricity utility, Eskom.

Duynefontein is also a landing point for the Meta 2Africa subsea cable.

== New nuclear power plant ==
The environmental impact assessments of 2009 have been revised and updated and public participation meetings held in Atlantic Beach Golf Club, Melkbosstrand on 12 October 2015 and Kenilworth Community Presbyterian Church, Kenilworth on 13 October 2015.

In 2025, the site received Environmental Authorization from the national government for the construction of a new nuclear power plant. The project awaits further statutory approvals.

== See also ==
- Duinefontein, archaeological sites
- Nuclear energy in South Africa
