= NNR (disambiguation) =

NNR may refer to:

- National nature reserve, an area protected by a nation to preserve wildlife etc.
- Nishi-Nippon Railroad, a railway company in Japan
- North Norfolk Railway, a heritage railway in England
- Naturally Nutrient Rich, a rating system for the nutritional content of food
- National Nuclear Regulator of South Africa
- Connemara Airport, Ireland (IATA code: NNR)
