= Renfrew Christie =

South African scholar and anti-apartheid activist (1949–2025)

Renfrew Leslie Christie
- Christie in 1988
- Born: 11 September 1949; Johannesburg, Transvaal, South Africa
- Died: 21 December 2025 (aged 76); Cape Town, South Africa
- Education: Oxford University (DPhil)
- Occupations: Senior Professor and Dean of Research
- Organization(s): uMkhonto we Sizwe, African National Congress

Renfrew Leslie Christie (11 September 1949 – 21 December 2025) was a South African scholar and member of the Anti-Apartheid Movement whose covert operations for uMkhonto we Sizwe, the paramilitary wing of the African National Congress, provided intelligence that made possible the 1982 bombing of the Koeberg Nuclear Power Station.

== Life and career ==
=== Early life ===
Christie was born in Johannesburg on 11 September 1949 and grew up in an impoverished family. He was strongly anti-apartheid from a young age. Many members of Christie's family fought against the Germans in World War II, and “I learned from them very early that what one does with Nazis is kill them,” he said.

=== During apartheid ===
Christie attended the University of the Witwatersrand and then received a scholarship to Oxford University. As part of his effort to sabotage the South African government's nuclear programme, he chose to study South Africa’s history of electrification for his doctoral dissertation, “so I could get into the electricity supply commission’s library and archives, and work out how much electricity they were using to enrich uranium.”

He was arrested, tortured, and sentenced to 10 years in prison under the Terrorism Act, 1967 for giving information on the nuclear programme of South Africa to the ANC. His actions were intended to thwart the apartheid regime's development of weapons of mass destruction, specifically the government's clandestine nuclear arsenal. His work succeeded in delaying by several years the development of apartheid South Africa's nuclear weapon programme.

=== After apartheid ===
Christie was released in 1986 after accepting P. W. Botha's offer of freedom in exchange for his renunciation of political violence.

After the fall of apartheid, Christie resumed his academic career at the University of the Western Cape. When asked by the BBC in 2018 if he was proud to have spied for the ANC, Christie said, "Absolutely. I was working for Nelson Mandela's military force, the uMkhonto we Sizwe. I'm very proud of that. We won. We got a democracy. We got a bill of rights. We got a constitutional court. It worked."

Christie died following a short illness at his home in Cape Town, on 21 December 2025, at the age of 76. After his death, South Africa's President Cyril Ramaphosa said Christie's “relentless and fearless commitment to our freedom demands our appreciation.” The ANC lauded Christie's “act of profound revolutionary significance” in sabotaging the racist regime's nuclear development.

== Bibliography ==
- The Electrification of South Africa, 1905-1975. British Library. 1993.
- Electricity, Industry and Class in South Africa. SUNY Press. 1984. ISBN 978-0-87395-854-7.
