= Valindaba =

Uranium enrichment plant in South Africa

Coordinates: 25°47′59″S 27°56′36″E

The Valindaba site, also known as Pelindaba East or Y-plant, was an experimental uranium enrichment plant, located 35 km west of Pretoria, Gauteng province, South Africa. The plant's name is consistent with the South African government's policy of official secrecy that concealed the plant's role in nuclear weapons production.

== History ==
The South African government announced in July 1970, that it was able to enrich uranium by means of the Helikon vortex separation process, by means of a jet-nozzle to accumulate the uranium 235 isotope. It was a variation of a method developed by Erwin Becker in Karlsruhe, Germany. West German firm Steinkohlen-Elektrizitats (STEAG) facilitated the transfer of the German process to the South Africans. Y-Plant was completed in 1975 by the Uranium Enrichment Corporation of South Africa (UCOR) and started producing HEU in 1978. During the 1970s, it was speculated that Valindaba may have supported the production of nuclear weapons. It was shut down for almost two years following an accident in 1979, but was back in production by 1981 and since then has produced all the fuel required by SAFARI-1.

It was alleged that in 1980 or 1981, South Africa had received low-enriched uranium from China, which the latter denied, for use as fuel for its Koeberg nuclear power plant rods. The worry at the time was that the newly obtained low-enriched uranium could be used to increase the output of highly enriched uranium. This weapons-grade material could potentially be turned into 2 or 3 nuclear weapons a year.

In 1978, President Jimmy Carter had signed into law the Nuclear Non-Proliferation Act of 1978, to curtail the sale of nuclear material. Two American brokering firms, Edlow International and SWUCO Inc, procured uranium fuel for South Africa and sent it to France for processing before being sent to the former country. The US State Department were aware of the deal in 1982 but had not discouraged it.

In 1985, it was estimated that the Valindaba plant was capable of producing 50 kg of highly enriched uranium per year. Early in 1986, the IAEA attempted to negotiate an inspection program for Valindaba with the South Africa government but talks broke down between the two parties.

In September 1989, FW de Klerk was appointed president of South Africa with a policy to improve the country's relationship with the rest of the world. He formed an expert committee to investigate the pros and cons of the country's nuclear weapons strategy and whether to join the Nuclear Proliferation Treaty (NPT). In November 1989, the committee recommended to end the program and dismantle the nuclear weapons.

With a committee composed of persons from AEC and Armscor, an 18-month timetable was created to dismantle and destroy the weapons, the storage of the nuclear material, the decontamination of the enrichment plant and the destruction of all scientific material and knowledge. On 1 February 1990, the Y-Plant at Valindaba was closed and dismantled. The 18 month timetable was completed in July 1991 and South Africa joined the NPT on 10 July 1991. They then joined the IAEA in September and on 10 October 1991 disclosed its nuclear materials, facilities and program. On 24 March 1993, President FW de Klerk announced to the world the end of the South African nuclear weapons program.

== See also ==
- NECSA
- Pelindaba
