= Ismail Ayob =

South African lawyer (1942–2025)

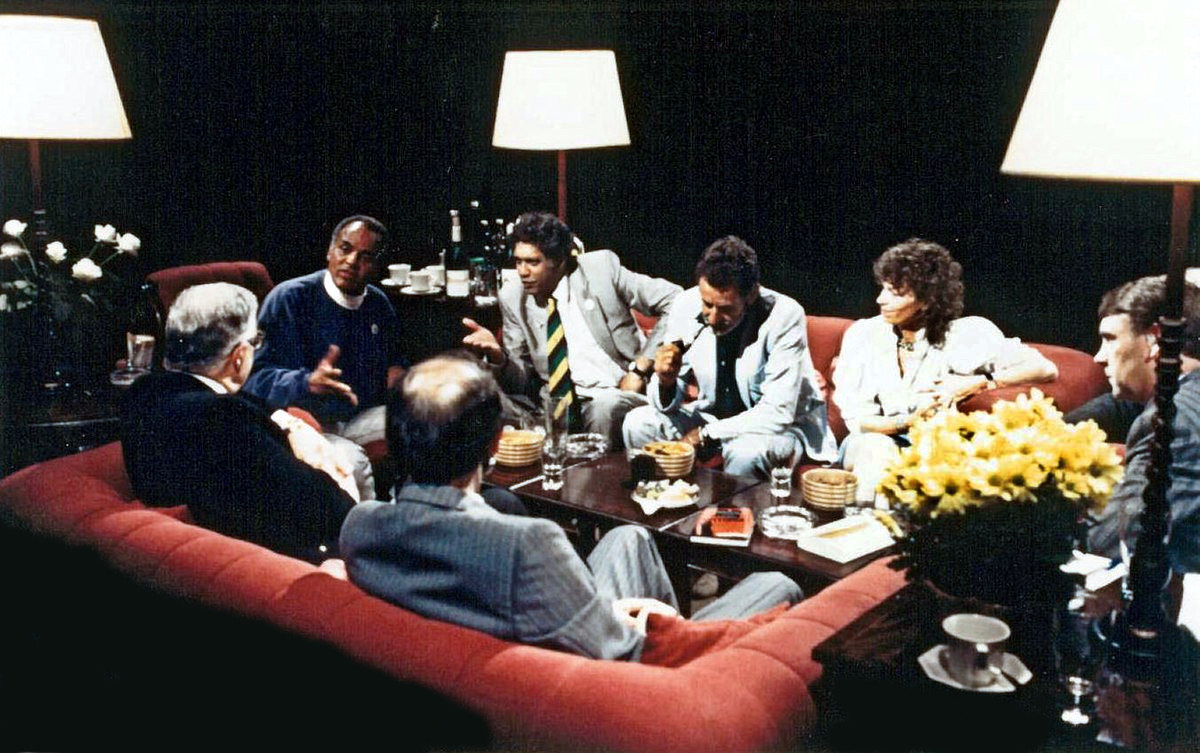
- Ayob appearing on British late-night live discussion programme After Dark on 11 June 1988: "South Africa"
- Born: 3 January 1942; Mafeking, South Africa
- Died: 17 December 2025 (aged 83); Johannesburg, South Africa
- Occupation: Lawyer
- Relatives: Ismail Mahomed (cousin)

Ismail Mahomed Ayob (3 January 1942 – 17 December 2025) was a South African lawyer. He practised law in South Africa and for much of his career the bulk of his work was with anti-apartheid cases. Ayob was involved in a much-publicised series of disputes with Nelson Mandela.

== Career ==
Ayob's cousin Ismail Mahomed, who was later Chief Justice of South Africa, helped Ayob secure his first job in 1969 at a firm involved in cases related to the anti-apartheid movement. In 1973, he left the firm to start his own company by the name of Ismail Ayob & Associates.

=== Apartheid era lawyer ===
For the first 20 years of his career, Ayob concentrated on human rights cases, acting for opponents of the apartheid regime. Ayob defended and represented many South African political prisoners. Ayob was one of the few people who were allowed to visit Nelson Mandela while he was imprisoned on Robben Island. His most high-profile case was that of Hélène Passtoors, a Belgian woman accused of ferrying arms for the then-banned African National Congress. Another high-profile client of Ayob's was Winnie Mandela, whom he represented during the Stompie Moeketsi kidnapping trial.

== Nelson Mandela lawsuit ==
Ayob was asked by Nelson Mandela in May 2005 to stop selling certain prints signed by Mandela and also to account for the proceeds of the sales of these prints in a prominently publicised application to the High Court of South Africa.

Ayob responded that he never sold any prints but had acted only in a professional capacity as attorney and agent for Mandela and his family. Under oath he said that he had never sold any prints nor was he a partner of anyone selling prints. In terms of the written contracts, Ayob was to receive royalties due to the Mandela family. These royalties were received from time to time and were held in the Mandela company accounts under his control; he gave a full accounting with an explanation.

Ayob denied any wrongdoing, and declared that he was the victim of a smear campaign orchestrated by Mandela's advisers, in particular lawyer George Bizos. One particular issue was the drawing up of a last will for Mandela. Nelson Mandela stated under oath that despite many requests, Ayob refused to draw up a will. In his answer Ayob enclosed copies of five different wills signed by Mandela over a period of years. These were produced as annexures to Ayob's answering affidavit.

After a difference of opinion with Mr Mandela, Ismail Ayob, Zamila Ayob, and Zayd Ismail Ayob were subject to an attack by Mandela's advisers. This campaign was driven through the media by page-one headlines and lead stories on radio and television. Six weeks later, proceedings were launched by Mandela. His new advisers supported the application by way of supporting affidavits. Major clients, religious bodies, mosques, the Law Society, cultural bodies, community associations, and the South African Revenue Service authorities were all contacted and attempts were made to vilify Ismail Ayob and his family. There were public meetings held in Pretoria and Durban. At these meetings, the Minister Essop Pahad in the office of the South African President Thabo Mbeki attacked Ayob and his entire family. He declared that it was an issue of guilt or innocence. Ahmed Kathrada, at a meeting he addressed in Laudium, called on Ayob to "surrender". Ahmed Docrat called Ayob a "crook" at the same meeting. There were calls for Ayob and his family to be ostracised by society and to be expelled from mosques and community and charitable organisations, and that there be protest marches and paid newspaper advertisements signed by supporters of Mandela.

In terms of the High Court rules, Mandela and his new advisers were required to reply within two weeks of the answer of Ismail Ayob and Zamila Ayob. Some 20 months later, no reply had been made.

=== 2007 court action ===
Ismail Ayob, George Bizos and Wim Trengrove were trustees of the Nelson Mandela Trust. The Trust was set up to hold money donated to Nelson Mandela. Ayob resigned from the Trust. In 2006, the two remaining trustees of the Nelson Mandela Trust launched an application against Ayob for disbursing money in terms of the trust deed without their express consent. Ayob explained these disbursements included money that was paid to the South African Revenue Service, to the children and grandchildren of Mandela, Mandela himself, and to an accounting company for four years of accounting work.

It was alleged that Ayob made defamatory remarks about Mandela in his affidavit, for which the court order stated that Ayob should apologise. These alleged that Mandela had foreign bank accounts and had not paid tax on these were later pointed out to have originated not from Ayob's affidavit but from Mandela's, George Bizos', and Iqbal Meer's affidavits against Ayob.

== Personal life and death ==
Ayob was born on 3 January 1942. He attended the Methodist Coloured School until the age of 14, when he was sent to Pretoria to continue his schooling at the Pretoria Indian Boys High School, as schools in his area were closed to him because of his race. He was married to Zamila Ayob and they had one son, Zayd Ismail Ayob, who is also his law partner.

Due to his Indian heritage, Ayob found that he could not attend university after he completed high school in 1959. He moved to London, where he attended the London School of Economics and read law. He qualified as a barrister and returned to South Africa to practise as an attorney.

Ayob died on 17 December 2025, at the age of 83.
