= Diane Victor =

South African artist and print maker (born 1964)

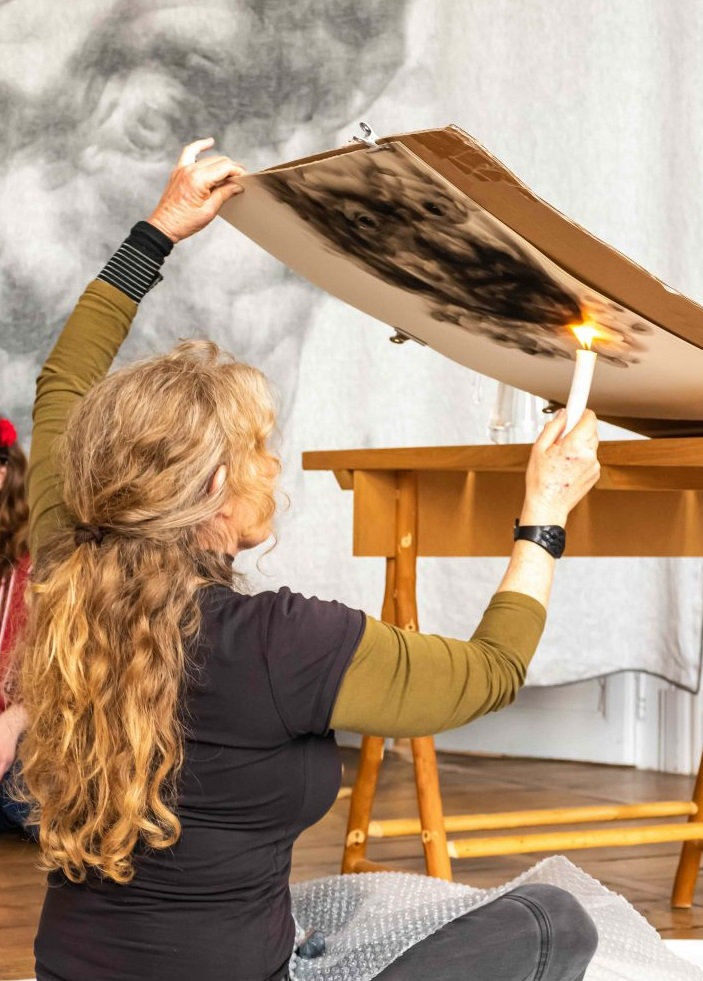
- Diane Victor creating a smoke drawing
- Born: 1964 (age 61–62); Witbank, South Africa
- Education: University of Witwatersrand
- Known for: Drawing, Print making
- Awards: L'Atelier Award (1988), Sasol New Signatures Award (1986)

Diane Victor, (born 1964, Witbank, South Africa) is a South African artist and print maker, known for her satirical and social commentary of contemporary South African politics.

== Biography ==
Victor was born in Witbank, South Africa. She received her BA Fine Arts degree from the University of the Witwatersrand in Johannesburg in 1986.

From 1990 to the present, Victor has lectured part-time, teaching drawing and printmaking at various South African institutions including the University of Pretoria, Wits Technikon, Pretoria Technikon, Open Window Academy, Vaal Triangle Technikon, the University of the Witwatersrand, Rhodes University and the University of Johannesburg.

== Artwork ==
Victor's work uses the figure, often her own self-portrait, to create complex narratives relating to contemporary South Africa and to the more global crisis of war, corruption and violence in both the public, political and in private life. According to Virginia Mackenny, Victor's work challenges the viewer "to scour her heavily packed images, densely rich in individual detail, to discover their levels of irony and action. Singularly devoid of any classicising hope of order, these images recall Breugel or Bosch in their pessimistic view of the world and the heaping of one folly on top of another". Victor depicts reality fraught with injustice, revealing the complexity of contemporary existence. Her "ability to present her themes and subjects in a manner that all but forces our identification with them ejects us out of our complacent stupors, whether we wish it or not."

Victor's ability to keep moving forward throughout a career that spans over 30 years, has ensured that she remains at the cutting edge in terms of craftsmanship and techniques. It also pertains to experimental drawing techniques, as seen in her invention of smoke drawings and ash drawings.

=== Printmaking ===
In her portfolio of dry point prints, Birth of a Nation (2009), published by David Krut Projects, Victor explores the history of colonial engagement in Africa in the context of contemporary corruption and imperialism. She uses historical and mythological references as a platform to insert South African narratives, fusing a recognisable storyline with new characters and South African subjects.

In the ongoing series of etchings, started in 2001, Disasters of Peace, Victor directly references Francisco de Goya's Disasters of War. In this series, Victor evokes Goya's criticism of the atrocities of war while demonstrating the continuation of violence after war, and in the case of South Africa, after the end of apartheid. Highlighting overlooked and everyday violence, this series draws attention to this contemporary desensitised gaze or tolerance of violence. To Victor: "The images I am working with are taken from our daily media coverage of recent and almost commonplace happenings in newspapers, on TV and on radio of social and criminal acts of violence and ongoing unnecessary deaths – occurrences so frequent that they no longer raise an outcry from our public, yet they still constitute disaster in peacetime.". To date (2020) this series consists of forty five etchings, each depicting a different disaster.

In the striking ‘4 Horses’, a set of four etchings with additional digital printing, Victor throws the viewer off balance with the sheer force of the imagery as she fuses herself crouched into or on to the body of a horse. Three of the four horses carry a human figure within like a foetus. The fourth horse, carries a diminutive female figure strapped to its back.

Victor works with several lithography workshops around the world, including in South Africa, France and the United States. In her stone lithograph Jumping the Shadow, the artist depicts an enormous boar or wild man whose shadow covers a landscape, also taking the form of a sleeping woman. The boar was created using the mezzotint technique, while the figure in the shadow was produced through line work and wash.

Victor also produced the triptych The Holy Masquerade, consisting of three stone lithographs: The Boy Who Cried Wolf, The Goat Who Led the Flock and The Girl Who Started the Trouble. All three works were made using the mezzotint technique. Gill Saunders discusses the triptych in the context of references and precedents in Victor's work.

=== Smoke drawings ===
Victor's smoke portraits explore subjects often overlooked, for example South African prisoners awaiting trial and missing children. These portraits capture individuals caught in a vulnerable moment, an idea reinforced through the impermanent nature of the medium used. Victor uses drawing media to capture both the subject's portrait and vulnerable condition that is somehow in-between presence and absence. Victor is attracted to the direct correlation between the fragility of human life and the susceptibility of the physical image. For Victor, "the portraits are made with the deposits of carbon from candle smoke on white paper. They are exceedingly fragile and can be easily damaged, disintegrating with physical contact as the carbon soot is dislodged from the paper. She was interested in the extremely fragile nature of these human lives and of all human life, attempting to translate this fragility into portraits made from a medium as impermanent as smoke itself"' Victor used the same medium to express the similarity between human genetic coding and that of other primates who are almost "little brothers". Yet like some distant and disowned family line we seem to feel no qualms at the knowledge of their persecution and endangerment. The fragile and ephemeral process of candle smoke Victor felt was an appropriate medium for the portraits of the primates rendered fragile and impermanent by mankind. Victor made another series of large smoke drawings of farm animals on glass called "Brief Lives", which were displayed in an abandoned abattoir. The glass drawings deal with the loss of body and identity and the nature of the smoke speaks of the transience of life.

=== Ash drawings ===
The technique of using ash as a drawing medium developed from printmaking. Texture and tone in etching is produced when rosin dust is sprinkled onto an etching plate to create an aquatint. Victor realised that a similar textural effect could be created on a drawing by sprinkling ash. Victor has exhibited her large scale ash drawings on numerous occasions, notably at the exhibition 'FUIR' at the Fondation Blachère in France, 2017 and at 1–54, Somerset House in London, 2019.

== Solo exhibitions ==
- 2026 "Diane Victor at Pavillon Comtesse de Caen, Académie des Beaux-Arts, Paris, France
- 2025 "Fallen Heads at Galerie Larock-Granoff, Paris, France
- 2025 "Exhibition and Book Launch, Musée Halle Saint Pierre, Paris, France
- 2025 "The Ground Beneath our Feet, Javett Centre, Pretoria, South Africa
- 2025 "Les Metamorphoses at Galerie Larock-Granoff, Paris, France
- 2024 "La Charge at Museum of Angoulème, France
- 2024 "Suie et Cendres at LAAC museum, Dunkirk, France
- 2024 "Les Raisons de la Colère at Museum of Drawing and Original Print, Gravelines, France
- 2023 "Diane Victor 'Prints Drawings Smoke' at Spier Arts Trust, Cape Town
- 2021 "Folly, Frailty and Fear" at University of Johannesburg Art Gallery
- 2019 "New World Order" at Turbine Art Fair, Johannesburg
- 2018 "Little History" at Johannes Stegmnn Gallery, Bloemfontein
- 2018 "The 14 Stations" installation for Aardklop Festival, University of Potchefstroom
- 2018 "Which Hunt" at Goodman Gallery, Cape Town
- 2017 "Showing Truth to Power" at David Krut Projects, New York
- 2015 "One Pound of Flesh" at Goodman gallery, Johannesburg
- 2014 "The Needle and the Damage Done" at David Krut Projects, Cape Town
- 2013 "No Country for old women" KKNK Festival artist exhibition, Oudtshoorn
- 2012 "Ashes to Ashes and Smoke to Dust", University of Johannesburg Art Gallery
- 2012 "Diane Victor – Recent work" at David Krut Projects, New York, USA
- 2011 "Fables and Folly" at the Faulconer Gallery, Grinnell College, Iowa, USA
- 2011 "Brief Lives", Festival artist at Innibos exhibition, Nelspruit
- 2011 "Ashes to Ashes and Smoke to Dust", University of Johannesburg art gallery
- 2010 "Smoke Screen: Frailty and Failing" at David Krut Projects, New York, USA
- 2010 "Transcend" at Goodman Gallery, Johannesburg
- 2009 Festival artist at Aardklop exhibition, Potchefstroom
- 2006 Solo show at Goodman gallery, Johannesburg
- 2005 Smoke Drawings at Michael Stevenson Gallery, Cape Town
- 2003 Solo show at Goodman gallery, Johannesburg
- 1999 Solo show at Goodman gallery, Johannesburg
- 1997 Joburg Theatre|Civic Theatre, commission, Tesson Theatre, Johannesburg
- 1994 Solo show at Goodman gallery, Johannesburg
- 1990 South African Arts Association, Pretoria Gallery on the Market, Johannesburg

== Group exhibitions – selection since 2010 ==
- 2020 "Animal Farm" at 1–54 London, UK
- 2020 "The Don Quixote Portfolio", Oliewenhuis, Bloemfontein, South Africa
- 2020 "The Lockdown Collection", South Africa
- 2020 "The Pandemic Project", UJ Arts & Culture, South Africa
- 2019 "Material Thinking", Durban
- 2019 "Little Brother" at 1–54 London, UK
- 2019 "Ampersand 21 years", Johannesburg
- 2019 "Grand Village", Nontron, France
- 2018 "Talking to Deaf Ears", Johannesburg
- 2017 "Fuir" Blachère Foundation, France
- 2017 Print Triennial, Chamalières, France
- 2017 "Rethinking Kakotopia" Johannesburg
- 2016 "Fire Starter" Pretoria
- 2015 "What remains is tomorrow" Venice Biennial
- 2015 "Die Burger – 100 years" South Africa
- 2014 "Ubuntu" Carnegie Hall, New York, USA
- 2014 "Nomad Bodies" Antwerp, Belgium
- 2013 "Fragile" Amsterdam, the Netherlands
- 2013 "Underculture" Port Elisabeth
- 2013 "Tom Waits for No Man", Johannesburg
- 2013 "Earth matters", Smithsonian Washington
- 2012 "Across parallel lines", China
- 2011 "Collateral", Auckland, NZ
- 2011 "Contemporaray prints SA", MOMA, NY, USA
- 2011 "1EEB4", Romania
- 2010 "Peek a Boo", Helsinki, Finland

== Collections ==
Victor's works are included in the following permanent collections: Metropolitan Museum of Art in New York, the MoMA – Museum of Modern Art print collection (NY), Smithsonian Institution, Iziko South African National Gallery, Bibliothèque Nationale de France, Victoria and Albert Museum, Albertina collection Vienna, Grinnell College Iowa USA, Johannesburg Art Gallery, University of Witwatersrand Art collection, University of Johannesburg collection, Standard bank of South Africa, Pretoria Art Museum, Fondation Blachère France, Musée du Dessin et de l'Estampe Originale, Gravelines, France

== Press reviews ==
- Herlo van Rensburg, "An interview with Diane Victor." Image and Text. No.5, pp. 27–31, August 1995
- Herlo van Rensburg, "Purging in the work of Diane Victor: Contradiction and Convergence", June 1996
- Chris Roper, "Each to his/her own", Mail & Guardian, 8 May 1998
- Brenda Atkinson, "Some gems at the end of the rainbow", Mail & Guardian,8 April 1999 (Review of Winsor and Newton Millennium Painting Competition)
- Brenda Atkinson, "Clean: An Exhibition of De-saturated Contemporary Art", ArtThrob, November 2001
- Daniel Thöle, "Social statements cross boundaries", Business Day, Tuesday, 9 April 2002 (Review of 'Transmigrations' at Pretoria Art Museum)
- Sue Williamson, "Grime' at Bell-Roberts Art Gallery", ArtThrob, July 2002
- Andrea Jonker-Bryce, "More than meets the eye", Dispatch Online, Thursday, 21 November 2002 (Review of 'Transmigrations' at Ann Bryant Art Gallery)
- Gordon Froud, "Dianne Victor". DESIGN ART. No 2, December 2010, pp. 63–73
- Bongo Mei, "Diane Victor's art and catharis", Daily Maverick, 30 September 2023
- (fr) Christian Noorbergen, « Diane Victor : les raisons de la colère », Artension, n°188, novembre-décembre 2024, p. 40-42.
- Gill Saunders, Diane Victor : A Triptych and its Antecedents, Print Quarterly, volume XLII n°1, p. 46-53.
- (fr) Christine Pinto, « Diane Victor, l'intranquille », Actuel, n°39, été 2026, p. 18-23.

== Bibliography ==
- 2026, Diane Victor: The Disasters of Peace, Bronwyn Law-Viljoen, Published by Editions Atelier le Grand Village ISBN 9781049226514
- 2022, Diane Victor: Prints Drawings Smoke, Published by Mare et Martin ISBN 9782362220807
- 2021, Vitamin D3: Today's Best in Contemporary Drawing, Published by Phaidon ISBN 9781838661694
- Hobbs, Philippa and Rankin, Elizabeth. Printmaking in a transforming South Africa Parkwood: 2008, David Phillip Publishers, 1997. ISBN 0864863349.
- 2012, Bronwyn Law-Viljoen, Juliet White, Karen von Veh and Luke Crossley Diane Victor – Burning the Candle at Both Ends Parkwood: David Krut Publishing. ISBN 9780958497534.
- 2008, Rankin, Elizabeth and Karen von Veh. TAXI-013: Diane Victor. Parkwood: 2008, David Krut Publishing Taxi Art Book. ISBN 9780958497589.
- 2004, Perryer, Sophie, ed. 10 years 100 Artists: Art in a Democratic South Africa. ISBN 1868729877.
- 2004, Personal Affects: Power and Poetics in Contemporary South African Art. ISBN 0945802420
- Rankin, Elizabeth, 2011. "Human rights and human wrongs: public perceptions of Diane Victor’s Disasters of Peace." South African Journal of Art History 26.1 (2011): 85–95.
- Rankin, Elizabeth, 2011. "Collateral: Printmaking as Social Commentary", Gus Fisher Art Gallery, University of Auckland
- Karen von Veh, 2018. Essay for Little History Johannes Stegmann Gallery, University of the Free State.
- Karen von Veh, 2012. “Loss and Transience in the work of Diane Victor.” Diane Victor: Burning the Candle at Both Ends. Johannesburg: David Krut. pp. 5–78.
- Karen von Veh, 2012. "Diane Victor, Tracey Rose, and the Gender Politics of Christian Imagery." African Arts. Winter 2012.Vol.45. no.4. pp. 22–33
- Karen von Veh, 2012. “The intersection of Christianity and Politics in South African art: a comparative analysis of selected images since 1960, with emphasis on the post-apartheid era.” De Arte 85. 2012. pp. 5–25.
- Karen von Veh, 2009. “Saints and Sinners: Re-Evaluating gendered power bases entrenched by religious imagery.” In A.A. du Preez (ed.) Taking a Hard Look: Gender and Visual Culture. Newcastle on Tyne: Cambridge Scholars Publishing. pp. 47–70.
- Karen von Veh, 2007. “Considerations on the Sasol Wax Art Awards” De Arte 75, September 2007, pp. 64–72.
- Karen von Veh, 2007. “Transformations of Religious Icons in the work of Diane Victor.” Proceedings of Transformation/s in Visual Culture. The 22nd Annual Conference of the South African Association of Visual Arts Historians, Published by VUT 2007 pp. 179–188.
- Karen von Veh, 2006. “Is there a place for Feminism in contemporary South African Art?” De Arte, No.73, 2006, pp. 28–42.
