= Absa L'Atelier Art Competition =

South African annual visual art award for young artists

The Absa L'Atelier Art Competition is a South African annual art award for South African visual artists between the ages of 21 and 35. The competition is run in conjunction with the South African National Association for the Visual Arts (SANAVA).

== History ==
The art award was originally known as the Volkskas Bank Atelier Competition and was established in 1986 and kept this name up to 1998 (when Volkskas was incorporated into the Absa Group). From 1999 to 2001 the award was known as the Absa Atelier competition.

From 2004 the Gerard Sekoto award was added to the competition, to support the most promising artist taking part in the competition with an income of less than R60 000 per annum. This award is supported by the French Embassy, the French Institute and Alliance Française.

In the early 1980s SANAVA acquired three atelier apartments at the Cité internationale des arts from where the name Atelier Competition has its origin. These assets are held in trust in terms of an Occupational Rights Agreement by the SANAVA Cité des Arts Trust, valid until 22 March 2060.

== Previous winners and merit awards ==
=== 1986 ===
Winner Penny Siopis

Merit Award Winners Deborah Bell, Andrew Breebaart, Dennis Purvis and Simon Stone

=== 1987 ===
Winner Clive van den Berg

Merit Award Winners Andries Botha, Philippa Hobbs, Tommy Motswai and Karel Nel

=== 1988 ===
Winner Diane Victor

Merit Award Winners Kay Cowley, Guy du Toit, Johann Louw and Margaret Vorster

=== 1989 ===
Winner Hennie Stroebel

Merit Award Winners Caroline Jones, Walter Oltman, Giulio Tambellini and Jeremy Wafer

=== 1990 ===
Winner Barend de Wet

Merit Award Winners Andrew Breebaart, Jean Bruwer, Guy du Toit and Judy Woodborne

=== 1991 ===
Winner Virginia McKenny

Merit Award Winners Nicole Donald, Ruth Mileham, Johann van der Schijff and Pierre van der Westhuizen

=== 1992 ===
Winner Paul Edmunds

Merit Award Winners Wayne Barker, Marc Edwards, Dominic Thorburn and Minette Vári

=== 1993 ===
Winner Dominic Thorburn

Merit Award Winners Siemon Allen, Diek Grobler, Adam Letch and Russel Scott

=== 1994 ===
Winner Jonathan Comerford

Merit Award Winners Andrew Putter, Kevin Roberts, Henk Serfontein and Alastair Whitton

=== 1995 ===
Winner Kevin Roberts

Merit Award Winners Moses Ceywayo, Gordon Froud, Diek Grobler and Peet Pienaar

=== 1996 ===
Winner Isaac Khanyile

Merit Award Winners Hanneke Benadé, Wim Botha, Semkelo Bunu and Berco Wilsenach

=== 1997 ===
Winner Ilse Pahl

Merit Award Winners Lucas Bambo, Cecile Heystek, Kim Lieberman and Richardt Strydom

=== 1998 ===
Winner Karl Gietl

Merit Award Winners Wayne Barker, Hanneke Benadé, Jean Brundit and Peter Rippon

=== 1999 ===
Winner Ryan Arenson

Merit Award Winners Brad Hammond, Fritha Langerman, Albert Redelinghuys and Vanessa van Wyk

=== 2000 ===
Winner Brad Hammond

Merit Award Winners Joni Brenner Natasha Christopher, Colbert Mashile and Nigel Mullins

=== 2001 ===
Winner Stefanus Rademeyer

Merit Award Winners Marco Cianfanelli, Daniel Hirschman, Brent Meistre and Merryn Singer

=== 2002 ===
Winner Marco Cianfanelli

Merit Award Winners Natasha Christopher, Alastair McLachlan, Benninghoff Puren and James Webb

=== 2003 ===
Winner Sanell Aggenbach

Merit Award Winners Retha Bornmann, Natasha Christopher, Patricia Driscoll and Berco Wilsenach

=== 2004 ===
Winner Conrad Botes

Merit Award Winners Stephen Hobbs Pieter Hugo, Lize Muller and Robert Rich

Gerard Sekoto Award Winners Billie Zangewa

=== 2005 ===
Winner Berco Wilsenach

Merit Award Winners Katherine Bull, Lawrence Lemoaona, Patrice Mabasa and Mikhael Subotzky

Gerard Sekoto Winner Lawrence Lemoaona

=== 2006 ===
Winner Ruth Sachs

Merit Award Winners Nathani Lüneburg, Riason Naidoo, Anet Norval and James Webb

Gerard Sekoto Winner Nomusa Makhubu

=== 2007 ===
Winner Pierre Fouché

Merit Award Winners Nina Barnett, Wayne Matthews, Lyndi Sales and Jaco Spies

Gerard Sekoto Winner Nina Barnett

=== 2008 ===
Winner James Webb

Merit Award Winners Christiaan Hattingh, Lunga Kama, Alhyrian Laue and Antonia Steyn

Gerard Sekoto Winner Retha Ferguson

=== 2009 ===
Winner Stephen Rosin

=== 2010 ===
Winner Ilka van Schalkwyk

Merit Award Winners Abri de Swardt, Philiswa Lila, Collen Maswanganyi and Hanje Whitehead.

Gerard Sekoto Winner Bongumenzi Ngobese

=== 2012 ===
Winner Elrie Joubert

Merit Award Winners Sibiya Bambo, Mandy Johnston, Heidi Janice Mielke and Nina Liebenberg

Gerard Sekoto Winner Sibiya Bambo

=== 2013 ===
Winner Pauline Gutter

Merit Award Winners Kathleen Sawyer and Jaco Van Schalkwyk

Gerard Sekoto Winner Mongezi Ncaphayi

=== 2014 ===
Winner Liberty Battson

Merit Award Winners Bevan de Wet and Luyanda Zindela

Gerard Sekoto Winner Mbavhalelo Nekhavhambe

=== 2015 ===
Winner Kai Losgott

Merit Award Winners Gideon Appah (non South African prize from Ghana), Nina Kruger and Nelmarie du Preez

Gerard Sekoto Winner Natalie Moore
