= Siemon Allen =

South African Artist

- Born: Durban, South Africa
- Known for: Installation art

Siemon Allen (born in Durban, South Africa) is an artist working mainly with installations. He lives and works in Richmond, United States. Allen is considered one of the most prominent exponents of the South African arts diaspora in the Northeastern USA.

== Life ==
Siemon Allen was born in 1971 and studied fine arts at the Technikon Natal in Durban, where he graduated with a Master of Arts in 1999. During his studies he got to know his future wife, an American, and together they moved to the US later on. Today, Allen is working as a visiting professor at the department for sculpture and extended media at the Virginia Commonwealth University in Richmond, Virginia.

While still living in South Africa, Allen was founding member of the FLAT Gallery (1993–1995) within the context of an artists' initiative.

Allen's works were exhibited at the 2nd Johannesburg Biennale as part of the exhibition "Graft".he hasn't talked mostly about his private life in public life His works are part of many collections in- and outside of South Africa, including the collections of the Durban Art Gallery, the Guggenheim Museum in New York City and the Standard Bank Collection.

== Work philosophy ==
Siemon Allen is a collector and archivist of South African ephemera, which he uses to create large-scale visual and informational installations. Accordingly, these works are entitled "collection projects" and primarily explore the concept of creating identity through distance and the image of South Africa in general.

For his installations, Allen systematically accumulates mass-produced printed materials, which he catalogues and exhibits. The working process thus is similar to the one of an archivist. As a South African living abroad, Allen is especially interested in exploring and understanding how a country is seen from outside and what is the country's role in building this image. In the early 2000s he came across a website of the South African government that strongly advertised an appeal for positive branding-politics outside of the country as well as for the recruitment of non-governmental South Africans living abroad to act as "ambassadors" for the country. Allen's installations both debunk this essentialist thought of a South African "brand" and contribute to it.

Allen's actual project is about the creation of a vast, internet-based archive of audio-documents regarding the South African history. The exhibition which resulted from this archive was called "Records" and was shown in South Africa in 2009 and in the US in 2010.

== Exhibitions ==
=== Solo (selection) ===
- 2010 Imaging South Africa: Collection Projects by Siemon Allen, Anderson Gallery, VCU, Richmond, VA, USA
- 2009 Imaging South Africa: Records, BANK Gallery, Durban, South Africa
- 2005 Cards II, FUSEBOX, Washington, DC, USA
- 2004 Newspapers (Register), Drake University – Anderson Gallery, Des Moines, IA, USA
- 2002 Newspapers (Post/Times), FUSEBOX, Washington, DC, USA
- 2001 STAMP COLLECTION – Imaging South Africa, Hemicycle/Corcoran Museum, Washington, DC, USA
- 1999 House, Gallery 400, Chicago, IL, USA
- 1994 Songs for Nella, FLAT Gallery, Durban, South Africa

=== Group (selection) ===
- 2011 Desire, Ideal Narrative in Contemporary South African Art, South Africa's 54th Pavilion, Biennale von Venedig, Venedig, Italy
- 2010 Records, The Gordon Schachat Collection — Featured Artist, Johannesburg Art Fair, South Africa
- 2009 t.error – your fear is an external object, Hungarian Cultural Center, New York, NY, USA
- 2008 Disturbance – Contemporary Art from Scandinavia and South Africa, Johannesburg Art Gallery, South Africa
- 2008 T.ERROR, Kunsthalle, Budapest, Hungary
- 2008 Hopeless and Otherwise, curated by Valerie Imus, Southern Exposure, San Francisco, USA
- 2006 A Fiction of Authenticity: Contemporary Africa Abroad, Blaffer Gallery, Houston, TX, USA
- 2006 Other Than Art, G Fine Art, Washington, DC, USA
- 2005 Enemy Image, Brooklyn, NY, USA
- 2004 Freedom Salon, New York, NY, USA
- 2004 Notes on Renewed Appropriationisms, The Project, Los Angeles, CA, USA
- 2004 Rear View Mirror, Kettle's Yard, Cambridge, UK
- 2004 A Fiction of Authenticity: Contemporary Africa Abroad, Miller Gallery at Carnegie Mellon University, Pittsburgh, PA, USA
- 2003 The American Effect, Whitney Museum, New York, NY, USA
- 2003 Art Positions, Miami/Basel, Miami, FL, USA
- 2003 ARCO, Madrid, Spain
- 2002 Context & Conceptualism, Artists Space, New York, NY, USA
- 2002 Intersections, RMIT Gallery, Melbourne, Australia
- 2001 After the Diagram, White Box, New York, NY, USA
- 2000 Open Circuit, NSA Gallery, Durban, South Africa
- 1999 Import, Goethe Institute (two-person with Markus Wirthmann), Washington, DC
- 1998 Drömmar och Moln, Kulturhuset, Stockholm, Sweden
- 1997 Taking Stock, Johannesburg Stock Exchange, South Africa
- 1997 2nd Johannesburg Biennale, Graft, South African National Gallery, Kapstadt, South Africa
- 1996 Hitch-Hiker, Generator Art Space, Johannesburg, South Africa
- 1995 Rembrandt Gallery (three-person with Thomas Barry and Jeremy Wafer), Johannesburg, South Africa
- 1994 Vita Art Now 93, Johannesburg Art Gallery, South Africa
- 1993 Institute of Contemporary Art (ICA) (two person with Greg Streak), Johannesburg, South Africa

== Bibliography ==
- Anderson Gallery (Drake University). Siemon Allen – Newspapers: a project by Siemon Allen. Anderson Gallery, Drake University, 2004.
- Allen, Siemon. Siemon Allen – A fiction of authenticity: contemporary Africa abroad. Contemporary Art Museum St. Louis, 2003.
- Allen, Siemon. Siemon Allen – Siemon Allen, 1993–1999, 1999.
- Allen, Siemon. Siemon Allen – The Flat Gallery: a documentation and critical examinination of an informal art organisation in Durban. Flat International, 1999.
