= Koeberg Alert =

Anti-nuclear activist organization

The Koeberg Alert alliance is an anti-nuclear activist organisation which emerged from an earlier pressure group in Cape Town called "Stop Koeberg" in 1983. Both were intended to halt construction of the first nuclear power station in South Africa at Duynefontein, 28 km NNW of Cape Town: the Koeberg Nuclear Power Station.

After failing to influence the then ruling National Party it turned to the broader democratic and anti-apartheid movement, hoping to influence future policy.

Koeberg formed an alliance with Earthlife Africa and the emerging Environmental Justice National Forum in the 1990s, it was revitalised in 2009 in opposition to President Thabo Mbeki's Pebble bed modular reactor programme and the emergence of "Nuclear-1" (a project to build additional nuclear reactors in South Africa) under President Jacob Zuma.

It currently organises various anti-nuclear campaigns, participates in the wider anti-nuclear and peace movements, and makes submissions and presentations to formal government processes relating to nuclear power.

Representatives have attended international nuclear power related conferences and events, including in Yokohama, Fukushima and Sweden.

In June 2021, Koeberg Alert's Peter Becker was appointed to the board of the National Nuclear Regulator. He was fired by the Minister of Minerals and Energy, Gwede Mantashe, in February 2022, citing Becker's opposition to nuclear power.

== Notable people ==
Some notable people active in the organisation:

- Mike Kantey – former secretary
- Keith Gottschalk – long-standing member
- Peter Becker – revived organisation in 2009
- David Fig

== See also ==
- Campaign Against Nuclear Energy
- List of anti-war organizations
