= SAHETI School =

Location
- Civin Dr; Johannesburg, Gauteng; South Africa
- 26°09′07″S 28°07′38″E

Information
- Type: Private school
- Motto: Greek: Γνώθι σαυτόν (Know thyself)
- Established: 16 January 1974; 52 years ago
- Founder: George Bizos
- Chairperson: Gary Ttappous
- Head of school: Morag Rees
- Exam board: IEB
- Enrolment: 1,116 (2024)
- Language: English, Greek
- Houses: Apollo; Artemis; Athena; Hermes
- Song: "Fill the World With Love"
- Alumni name: Old Sahetians
- Website: saheti.co.za

SAHETI School (Note: the South African Hellenic Educational and Technical Institute, abbreviated as SAHETI) is a private, co-educational school in Johannesburg, South Africa. The school offers education from play school through to high school. It was established in 1973 by the Greek community, led by George Bizos, the Greek lawyer of Nelson Mandela, as a non-profit educational institution.

Since 2001, SAHETI School has been an examination centre for the Certification of Attainment in Greek (Greek: Eλληνομάθεια, romanized: Ellinomátheia) examinations, organised by the Centre for the Greek Language. It is one of only two examination centres in South Africa.

== History ==
=== Foundations and early development ===
The school was established in 1974 in Senderwood, Bedfordview, on the eastern outskirts of Johannesburg. The initiative followed several earlier attempts by the Greek community to establish a formal educational presence in the Transvaal, such as the "Hellenic Government School" in Malvern, which operated in the 1930s.

In the 1960s, the SAHETI Institute purchased a 290,539-square-metre (71.8-acre) farm to serve as the campus. However, the project faced significant delays in fundraising and construction until 1969, when human rights lawyer Advocate George Bizos assumed the chairmanship of the school's board. Bizos, who had arrived in South Africa as a refugee during World War II, coordinated Greek community support for the school's funding. Early fundraising efforts included a debutante ball in 1971 and the "auctioning" of classroom naming rights to donors, many of whose names remain above the doors today. Construction then began in August of the same year.

During the Apartheid era, SAHETI distinguished itself by maintaining an open-enrolment policy. It admitted students regardless of race or background at a time when South African education was strictly segregated. This policy stemmed from the Hellenic ideal that "Greeks are those who participate in Greek culture", a philosophy Bizos adapted from Isocrates to ensure the school served as a multiracial "rainbow" institution.

The school officially opened in January 1974 with an initial enrolment of 114 students, including 60 in preschool and 54 in Grades 1–3. Annual fees at opening ranged between R 60 and R 84 per term.

=== Evolution and growth ===
From its inception as a primary school, SAHETI expanded incrementally to offer a full secondary education, reaching its first matriculation class under the chairmanship of Bizos (who served until 1989). In 1996, two years after South Africa's first democratic elections, the school was visited by President Nelson Mandela, a lifelong friend and client of George Bizos.

In 2003, Bizos established the George Bizos SAHETI Scholarship and Bursary Fund (GBSSBF) to support students of outstanding ability who faced financial barriers. Notable attendees during the transition to democracy included the children of assassinated anti-apartheid leader Chris Hani.

By the early 21st century, the school had grown to an enrolment of approximately 1,300 students representing over 26 different ethnicities. It transitioned from a community-focused cultural school to a high-performing academic institution. In 2024, the school was recognised as the top-performing private school in South Africa based on Independent Examinations Board (IEB) results, achieving an average of 4.5 distinctions per candidate.

In the same year, the school also celebrated its 50th anniversary with the publication of the commemorative volume And Not to Yield, authored by Digby Ricci, Dr Daniela Pitt, and John Generalis.

== Campus ==
The SAHETI campus was developed in phases from the mid-1970s onwards, following a master plan designed by architects including Mira Fassler Kamstra and Marcus Holmes. The campus design has since received awards from the Institute of South African Architects.

A central feature of the campus is the avli (Greek: αυλή), an outdoor amphitheatre used for assemblies and cultural events. The campus includes academic buildings, science and computer laboratories, a music centre, art facilities, a chapel, sports fields, an Olympic-size swimming pool, and athletics facilities. The foundation stone of the school incorporates Pentelic marble sourced from Greece.

== Educational structure ==
SAHETI provides education spanning from pre-primary through to Grade 12. The curriculum is aligned with the standards set by the Independent Examinations Board (IEB), which prepares learners for the National Senior Certificate (NSC) examinations.

=== Greek language education ===
Since the school's founding, Greek has been a compulsory subject for all learners. In primary school, instruction is offered at Ordinary, Intermediate, and Advanced levels, according to learners' proficiency. From Grades 10 to 12, students may either continue Modern Greek as a Second Additional Language for their NSC examinations, or transition to Hellenic Studies, which is assessed internally only and is not recognised by the IEB.

The language curriculum is further supplemented by optional cultural activities such as Classical and Traditional Greek Dancing as well as the Bouzouki Band.

=== Academic performance ===
The school has maintained a consistent 100% pass rate in IEB examinations over many years.

In the 2024 examinations, SAHETI was identified as the top-performing private school in the country, with its 64 matriculants achieving 286 distinctions—an average of 4.5 per candidate. Every student in the 2024 class achieved at least one distinction, and 27% of the class earned a "full house" (distinctions in all seven or more subjects).

Academic results from previous years also show a high frequency of distinctions. In 2021, the matric class achieved 340 distinctions (4.5 per candidate), while the 2023 class recorded 262 distinctions (4 per candidate). The school consistently places students on the IEB's "Outstanding" and "Commendable" achiever lists, which recognise candidates who rank within the top 5% of learners nationally in multiple subjects.

== Commemorations ==
SAHETI marks several historical and cultural observances, including:

- Oxi Day (28 October) – commemoration of Greece's refusal to surrender to Italian forces in 1940
- Greek Independence Day (25 March) – a dual celebration of religious significance (Annunciation of the Virgin Mary) and the 1821 uprising against the Ottoman Empire
- Founders' Day (2 June) – an annual event celebrating the establishment of the school and the vision of George Bizos

These events typically involve assemblies and performances in the school's avli.

== Notable alumni ==
- Tim de Maayer – pediatric gastroenterologist
- Katy Katopodis – journalist and editor-in-chief at Kaya 959
- George Kutra – founder of the Mythos restaurant brand
- Dino Mavrokordatos – interior designer and founder of Onid Design
- Natasha Sideris – founder and CEO of the tashas Group, an international restaurant chain
- Elizabeth Sidiropoulos – Chief Executive of the South African Institute of International Affairs (SAIIA)
- Zano Tyrannis – healthcare and business executive
- Robyn Yannoukos – animator and two-time Emmy Awards winner (2015 and 2018)
