= David Krut =

South African art publisher and dealer

David Krut is a South African art publisher and dealer with a focus on artists from South Africa. He is best known for his publication of the Taxi Art books and David Krut Projects.

Krut has promoted contemporary South African art and artists with a focus on editions from David Krut workshop, arts education, and book publishing. He represents South African artists William Kentridge, Diane Victor, Stephen Hobbs, and Deborah Bell, as well as Ethiopian artist Aida Muluneh.
