= Southern African Institute of Steel Construction =

Organization which helps building and construction in South Africa

The Southern African Institute of Steel Construction (SAISC) is an organization which helps building and construction in South Africa by serving to promote and develop companies providing steel-related products and services to the industry.

== History ==
The institute was founded on 24 March 1956 when South Africa was still a Union under the Nationalist Government. It was known as the Structural Steel Publicity and Advanced Association Limited. The first meeting of the association took place on 12 September 1956 in Johannesburg in the Barclay Bank building which stood on the corner of Commissioner and Market Streets. The staff consisted on a single engineer offering his services on a part-time with a membership of 18 members.

As a result of World War II, the cheapness of concrete enabled it to encroach upon work which until previously had been the domain of the steel industry. The institute was born to rectify this situation.

In 1958 the association started to receive copies of publications from Belgium and Luxemburg, and the American Institute of Steel started to send their journal. The association found themselves on the mailing list for Acier-Stahl-Steel a steel-structure based journal in three languages. The board management found this journal to be so informative that it sponsored the circulation of the journal to engineers and architects to promote publicity, something that continued until the demise of the journal.

In 1960 the institute employed an engineer, Mr Robert McHalfie-Clarke, on a part-time basis. Scottish and born in 1906 McHalfie-Clarke was a consulting engineer who specialised in structural steel design. Some of his structures including Iscor head office in Pretoria and Newcastle as well as the Norwich Union Building in Pretoria. He was to remain on the scene until 1976 when Dr. Hennie de Clercq took the over the reigns.

At the 5th annual general meeting a resolution was placed before members that the name of the company be changed. In 1961, the institute changed its name to the 'South African Institute of Steel Construction, and more recently the Southern African Institute of Steel Construction.

Today the institute has over 600 members.

== Periodicals ==
- Steel Construction Journal

== Subsidiary associations ==
SASFA - Southern African Light Steel Frame Building Association The Southern African Light Steel Frame Building Association (SASFA), was formed in October 2006 as a division of the Southern African Institute of Steel Construction (SAISC). The founder members are ArcelorMittal (Steel), Everite (fibre cement cladding Saint-Gobain Construction Products)(gypsum board lining and insulation), and Lafarge (gypsum board lining).

An Executive committee, with representatives from the major material suppliers, manufactures, equipment suppliers and the Institute of Steel Construction, guides and monitors the activities of the Association. Technical and Training committees deal with technical and training matters.

SASFA has been established as the industry representative association for light steel frame building. It has more than 70 company members- see membership list on www.sasfa.co.za.

According to SASFA records, there are already 33 companies manufacturing light steel frames on profiling facilities in South Africa. They have a combined annual manufacturing capacity (single shift basis) of 55 million linear meters of light steel sections, or 56 000 tons/year of galvanized steel, of which a third is dedicated to the manufacture of light steel roof trusses. This means that South African has sufficient manufacturing capacity to produce light steel frames for 2,1 million m^{2} and trusses for 2,0 million m^{2} per year of floor area of building

Manufacturing facilities are also being established in neighbouring countries.

POLASA - Power Line Association of South Africa The Power Line Association of South Africa (POLASA), was formally established on 15 August 2013. The Southern African Institute of Steel Construction (SAISC]) hosted a breakfast function in launching the Power Line Association of SA on the day.

Mr Gray Whalley, MD of Babcock Ntuthuko Powerlines is the first Chairman of the Association and he made a short presentation on the state of the industry and challenges that need to be faced.

Power line construction is integral in the National Development Plan (NDT) where out of the 18 Presidential Infrastructure Coordinating Commission (PICC) Strategic Integrated Projects (SIP's), six contain transmission and distribution infrastructure. POLASA is involved in SIP number ten which is Electricity Transmission and Distribution for all.

When the association was officially launched, there were about 16 members. There are now 32 members. The first annual meeting was held on 7 November 2013.

SAMCRA - South African Metal Cladding and Roofing Association From the turn of the century there was a progressive decline in the quality of metal cladding products sold into the South African market. Professionals and developers were becoming increasingly concerned with the integrity of the industry both from the manufacturing and installation point of view. In October 2012 a group of concerned individuals called a meeting of the major players which included representatives from the producer mills, manufactures, installers, suppliers of ancillary items, professionals and other interested parties. At this meeting it was agreed to form a committee that would consolidate the ideas and proposals discussed during the meeting and to draft a basic structure for formal association to known as the Southern African Metal Cladding and Roofing Association (SAMCRA).

At the meeting SAMCRA had nine founder members plus three new members. The association now has a membership number of seventeen members.

The Founder members of SAMCRA are:

- ArcelorMittal SA - www.arcelormittalsa.com
- BlueScope Steel - www.bluescopesteel.co.za
- BSI Steel - www.bsisteel.com
- Clotan Steel - www.clotansteel.co.za
- Global Roofing Solutions - www.globalroofs.co.za
- Heunis Steel - www.heunis.co.za
- Macsteel Roofing - www.macsteel.co.za
- Pro Roof Steel Merchants - www.proroof.co.za
- Safintra - www.safintra.co.za

During this process it was decided to approach the SAISC with the prospect of SAMCRA becoming a sub-association of the SAISC. An agreement was concluded and on 22 August 2013 SAMCRA held its inaugural meeting. During the inaugural meeting, Johann van der Westhuizen was elected as the Chairman of the association.

Both SAISC and SAMCRA jointly launched the Southern African Metal Cladding and roofing Association (SAMCRA) in Johannesburg in the SAISC boardroom on 30 October 2013. Newly elected SAMCRA Chairman, Johann van der Westhuizen, said that in an industry which uses, inter alia, 650 000 tons of metal and colour-coated coil per annum, the need for an industry association has become essential.

ISF - International Steel Fabricators The International Steel Fabricators is a joint-venture marketing consortium representing the leading players in the South African structural steel construction industry whose objective are to increase their export sales by pooling their resources. The International Steel Fabricators (ISF) established in 1991 by the five big structural companies Genrec Engineering, Aveng Steel Fabrication, and the other three remaining companies no longer exist. The five structural companies were in Australia in a meeting bidding for one tender in Israel and they decided to form a partnership called International Steel Fabricators (ISF). The International Steel Fabricators work as a partnership until they get a request from the Minister of Trade and Industry to register the company, in 1999 International Steel Fabricators (ISF) was registered and became the formal independent exports company.

ISF started with five members, today the company has over 50 members. In order to be an ISF member everyone has to satisfy the two rules from the ISF constitution, firstly have to be a member of Southern African Institute of Steel Construction and secondly pay the joining fees.

International Steel Fabricators members have a combined capacity in excess of 20 000 tons of steelwork a month and with their holding companies have combined turnover of billions per year. The ISF steel producers are AcrelorMittal South Africa and Evraz Highveld Steel & Vanadium.

SAISC School of Draughting The SAISC/DSE School of Draughting is a division of the Southern African Institute of Steel Construction (SAISC). The SAISC School of Draughting was launched in September 2007, and Howard Fox was appointed as draughtsperson to conduct the training. The school opened its doors on 15 October 2007, as a joint initiative between DSE now known as Aveng Grinaker-LTA Mechanical & Electrical DSE Fabrication. The objective being to train learners to become structural steelwork detailers, with ability to design simple connections and to have an all-round knowledge of the steelwork industry, and to address the need for trained structural steel detailers. The primary skills relates to the production of structural steel drawings for fabrication and erection of steel structures as well as the understanding of the steel construction industry and how to operate within the legislative, safety and quality systems which govern the industry.

The Southern African Institute of Steel Construction (SAISC) set in motion the initiative to begin a specialist school. The process began by developing a course outline which, after 18 months of negotiation, was certified by the South African Qualification Authority (SAQA). At a later stage the course was registered as a learneship with the Department of Labour (DOF). To complete the process, the Construction Education and Training Authority (CETA) required that course material be developed. The course material was achieved after two years at a cost of about R 1.8-million, half of this amount was provided by the Southern African Institute of Steel Construction (SAISC) and the other half by the Construction Education and Training Authority (CETA).

The next step was to set up the school and train staff. A part of Aveng Grinaker-LTA Mechanical & Electrical DSE Fabrication, DSE provided the solution to the premises issue. The school operated from the DSE premises in Germiston with 10 trainees. The school offered the National diploma on a full-time basis. On 1 April 2014, the SAISC School of Draughting was relocated to Genrec Engineering in Wadeville, Germiston. Genrec Engineering is a division of Murray & Roberts limited. It was an advantage for the school to be on the premises of structural steel fabricators.

The SAISC School of Draughting offers the Diploma, Learnerships, Skill programmes and Shortage course on a full-time and part-time bases to companies and private individuals, for the whole of South African Steelwork Industry, and has a capacity for 25 trainees. It is a non profit, Section 21 Company with a board of directors, with members from the Southern African Institute of Steel Construction (SAISC), DSE as well as an executive committee. The course comprises many specialist Unit Standards, many of which have outcomes at National Qualifications Framework (NQF) Level 5, and will be a diploma qualification.
