= George Bizos =

Greek-South African lawyer (1927–2020)

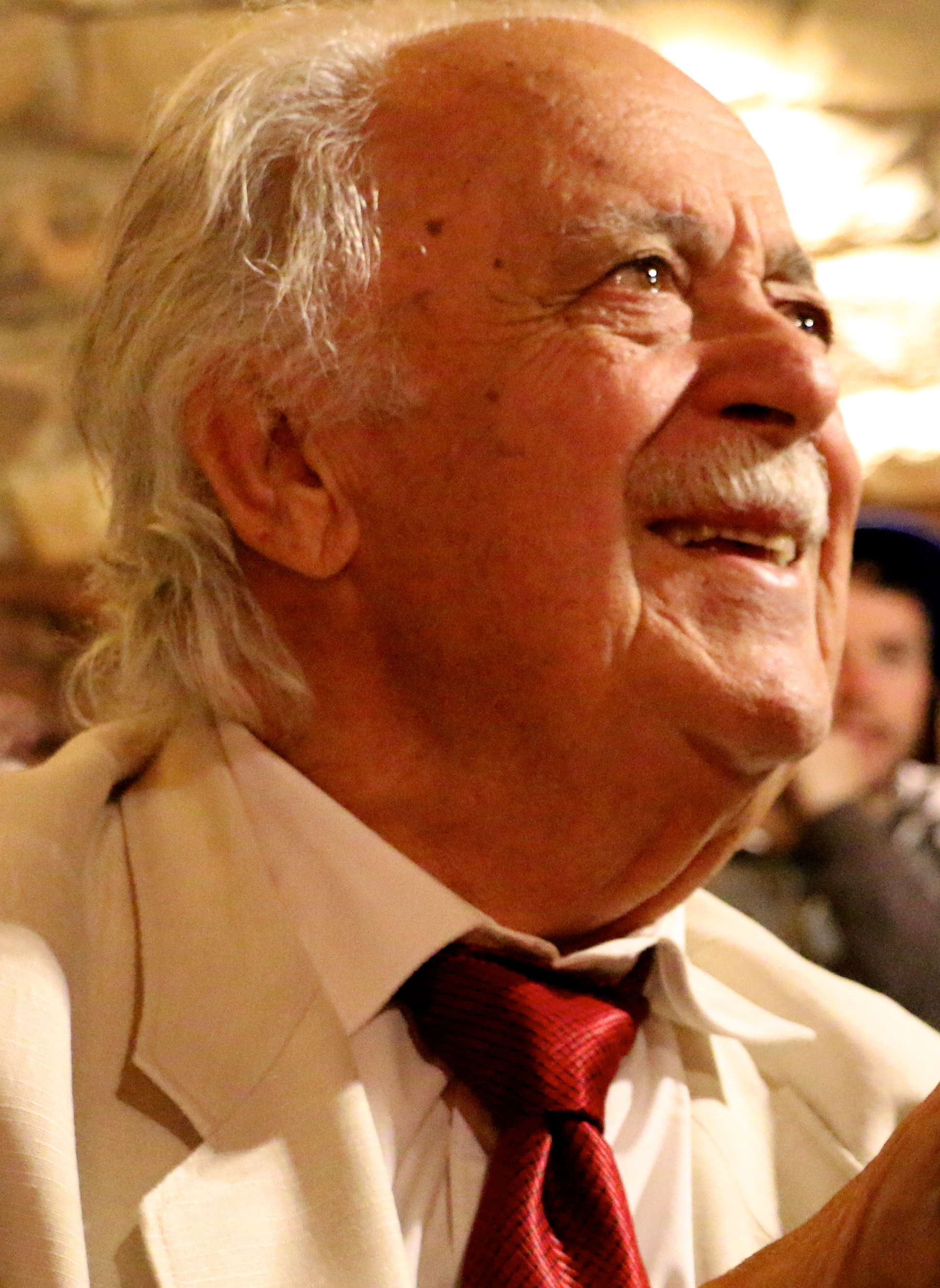
- Bizos in 2014
- Born: 14 November 1927; Vasilitsi, Messenia, Second Hellenic Republic
- Died: 9 September 2020 (aged 92); Johannesburg, South Africa
- Education: University of the Witwatersrand
- Occupation: Human rights lawyer
- Spouse: Arethe Daflos (m. 1948; died 2017)
- Children: 3

George Bizos (Greek: Γιώργος Μπίζος; 14 November 1927 – 9 September 2020) was a Greek-South African human rights lawyer who campaigned against apartheid in South Africa. He represented Nelson Mandela during the Rivonia Trial. He instructed Mandela to add the qualification "if needs be" to his trial address, which is credited with sparing him from a sentence of death. Bizos also represented the families of anti-apartheid activists killed by the government, throughout the hearings of the Truth and Reconciliation Commission. He also represented victims of the Marikana massacre.

== Early life ==
Bizos was the son of Antonios "Antoni" Bizos, the mayor of the small village of Vasilitsi, south of Koroni and Kalamata on the Messenia peninsula of the Peloponnese, Greece. He was born on 14 November 1927, although this was erroneously recorded on his South African identity documents as 1928, owing to his father's declaration to the authorities upon arrival in Egypt.

In May 1941 at the age of thirteen, Bizos and his father helped seven New Zealand Army soldiers (Don Gladding, Mick Karup, Peter Martin, John Lewis and three others) who were hiding in the hills to escape the German-occupied Greek mainland for Crete. The nine set out to sea at night, with only a cheap compass and a map torn from an atlas, intending to escape to Crete. On the second day at sea, rough winds took the sail out of control and tore through its canvas. The men had to take turns to row throughout the night until they managed to repair the sail. On the third day, they spotted a ship in the distance. They managed to attract the attention of the crew of what turned out to be the British destroyer, HMS Kimberley, on its way to the Battle of Crete. After the battle, the Kimberley dropped him and his father off at Alexandria, Egypt.

As a refugee, Bizos was sent to the Union of South Africa and landed in Durban. From there he went by train to Johannesburg, disembarking at the Braamfontein railway station. At the time, the Ossewabrandwag, an Afrikaner group with Nazi sympathies, were demonstrating against the arrival of refugees. The Ossewabrandwag blamed Jan Smuts for bringing the vuilgoed (rubbish) of Europe to South Africa. The local Greek community helped integrate him into society.

Bizos did not go to school for his first two years in the country as he spoke neither English nor Afrikaans. He gained entry to the University of the Witwatersrand in 1949, where he met Nelson Mandela and undertook a 3-year Bachelor of Arts degree, followed by a three-year LLB law degree. It was during this time that he first became politically active, joining the students' representative council under the leadership of Harold Wolpe.

== Legal career ==
=== Apartheid era ===
Bizos joined the Bar in Johannesburg in 1954. During the 1950s and 1960s he was counsel to a wide range of well-known people including Trevor Huddleston of Sophiatown.

At the Rivonia Trial from 1963 to 1964, Bizos was part of the team that defended Nelson Mandela, Govan Mbeki and Walter Sisulu. The accused were sentenced to life imprisonment, but spared the death penalty. Although it is sometimes said that he claims to have drafted Mandela's famous speech spoken at the trial, he says that his main contribution was to advise the use of the words "if needs be" before Mandela said that he was prepared to die. Bizos believed that this may have contributed to the avoidance of the death penalty, by having Mandela not appear to seek martyrdom. This trial saw the arrival of a group of human rights lawyers – Joel Joffe, Harry Schwarz, Arthur Chaskalson and Harold Hanson.

Bizos was counsel for the accused in at least 26 other prominent anti-apartheid trials and inquests. In 1969 he acted for the defence of Winnie Madikizela-Mandela and 21 others on charges of contravening the Suppression of Communism Act and Unlawful Organisations Act. Together with Arthur Chaskalson and Dennis Kuny, he also represented the NUSAS Five who were charged with furthering the aims of the African National Congress and communism in 1975.

Bizos subsequently became a senior member of the Johannesburg Bar in 1978. He was a member of the National Council of Lawyers for Human Rights, which he helped found in 1979. He was senior counsel at the Legal Resources Centre in Johannesburg in the Constitutional Litigation Unit. He also served as a judge on Botswana's Court of Appeal from 1985 to 1993.

=== Post-apartheid ===
Bizos became a member of the African National Congress' (ANC) Legal and Constitutional Committee in 1990, and at Convention for a Democratic South Africa (CODESA) he served as advisor to the negotiating teams and participated in drawing up the Interim Constitution. He was involved in the drafting of legislation, and particularly the Truth and Reconciliation Bill and amendments to the Criminal Procedures Act, to bring it into line with Chapter 3 of the constitution, guaranteeing fundamental human rights to all citizens of South Africa.

Bizos was retained as counsel at various inquests into the deaths of people in detention. During the Truth and Reconciliation Commission hearings, he was the leader of the team that opposed applications for amnesty on behalf of the Biko, Hani, Goniwe, Calata, Mkonto, Mhlauli, Slovo and Schoon families.

Bizos was appointed by President Mandela to the Judicial Services Commission in 1994. It was responsible for recommending candidates for appointment as judges, as well as proposing post-apartheid reforms to the judicial system. Bizos was the leader of the team for the South African Government to argue that the death penalty was unconstitutional, and counsel for the National Assembly in the Certification of the Constitution by the Constitutional Court. He later served as a legal advisor to Mandela in 2005, during a bitter legal dispute with the latter's former lawyer, Ismail Ayob. He also represented the Chinese Association of South Africa in a case that ended in 2008 in which Chinese South Africans were granted 'previously disadvantaged' status, thus qualifying them for Black Economic Empowerment benefits.

=== Film about Rivonia ===
In 2017 Bizos appeared along with surviving defendants at the Rivonia Trial, Denis Goldberg, Andrew Mlangeni and Ahmed Kathrada, along with fellow defence lawyers Joel Joffe and Denis Kuny, in a documentary film entitled Life is Wonderful, directed by Sir Nicholas Stadlen, which tells the story of the trial. The title reflects Goldberg's words to his mother at the end of the trial on hearing that he and his comrades had been spared the death sentence.

=== Notable people represented ===
Bizos represented the following people, among others:

- Nelson Mandela, since the 1950s
- Trevor Huddleston of Sophiatown, 1950s
- Mac Maharaj in the Little Rivonia Trial
- Govan Mbeki in the Rivonia Trial in 1963–64
- Walter Sisulu in the Rivonia Trial in 1963–64, and afterwards his wife
- Ahmed Timol's family, regarding his death in detention in 1971
- Steve Biko's family, regarding his death in detention in 1977
- Neil Aggett's family, regarding his death in detention in 1982
- Rob Adam in a trial for involvement in ANC activities, 1982
- Patrick Lekota (known as "Terror") and Popo Molefe at the Delmas Treason Trial, 1985–89
- Chris Hani's family, during a Truth and Reconciliation Commission hearing where Hani's assassins had applied for amnesty
- Morgan Tsvangirai, leader of the Movement for Democratic Change of Zimbabwe, when he was charged with planning a coup d'état before the 2002 general elections
- Winnie Madikizela-Mandela

== Other activities ==
In the 1970s Bizos helped start a Greek school, called SAHETI. It embraced Hellenism, yet was non-exclusionist, even during the heart of apartheid. It was here that people like Chris Hani's children were educated. Bizos became the role model for Angelique Rockas leading up to her founding of the Internationalist Theatre.

Two of Mandela's daughters brought court action in 2013 to oust Bizos, ex-Housing Minister Tokyo Sexwale and lawyer Bally Chuene as directors of two of Mandela's firms. Bizos said that the daughters were trying to "get their hands on things that should not be sold". The case was delayed after the daughters' lawyer Ismail Ayob withdrew from the case.

== Personal life and death ==
Bizos was married to Arethe Daflos, known as "Rita", whom he met in 1948 when she was an art student. The couple had three sons. Rita died in 2017, shortly before her husband's 90th birthday.

Bizos died of natural causes at home on 9 September 2020 at the age of 92. He was given a special state funeral on 17 September and was buried at Westpark Cemetery next to his wife Rita.

== Recognition and honours ==
- 1999: Order for Meritorious Service Class II medal from President Mandela
- 2001: International Trial Lawyer Prize of the Year, by the International Academy of Trial Lawyers
- 2004: Bernard Simons Memorial Award, awarded by the International Bar Association

On 6 February 2022, the 40th anniversary of Neil Aggett's death in custody, there was a commemoration to honour Aggett at Westpark Cemetery, organised by the Kathrada Foundation. His de facto widow Liz Floyd addressed the group, and paid tribute to Bizos, Max Coleman, and Frank Dutton, who fought for justice for Aggett and other detainees.

== Legacy ==
- George Bizos SAHETI Scholarship and Bursary Fund
- Arethe Daflos-Bizos Arts Scholarship (announced on Bizos's 90th birthday to honour his late wife)

== Works ==
- No One to Blame?: In Pursuit of Justice in South Africa. New Africa Books. 1998. ISBN 978-0-86486-319-5.
- Odyssey to Freedom. South Africa: Penguin & Random House. 2011. ISBN 978-1-4152-0307-1.
- 65 Years of Friendship. Penguin Random House South Africa. 2017. ISBN 9781415208861.
