= Go Open Source =

Go Open Source was a campaign mainly concentrating on South Africa to create awareness of, educate about, and provide access to free/open-source software. The campaign was important in ensuring, once awareness of free and open source software was created, that interested parties had the ability to gain access to the software and services and that they have access to additional resources for support and training. The campaign contributed in planning for a transition to free/open-source software within the South African government. The campaign also launched the Geek Freedom League which is a group promoting free/open-source software to South Africa. As of May 2006 there are nearly 5000 South African members.

The campaign was launched by Mark Shuttleworth on behalf of Canonical, the CSIR's Meraka Institute, HP, and the Shuttleworth Foundation.

The Go Open Source campaign officially launched in May 2004 and completed its two-year run at the end of May 2006.

== See also ==
- ubuntu
- GNU Project
