= Pelindaba =

South African nuclear research centre

Coordinates: 25°48′2″S 27°56′2″E

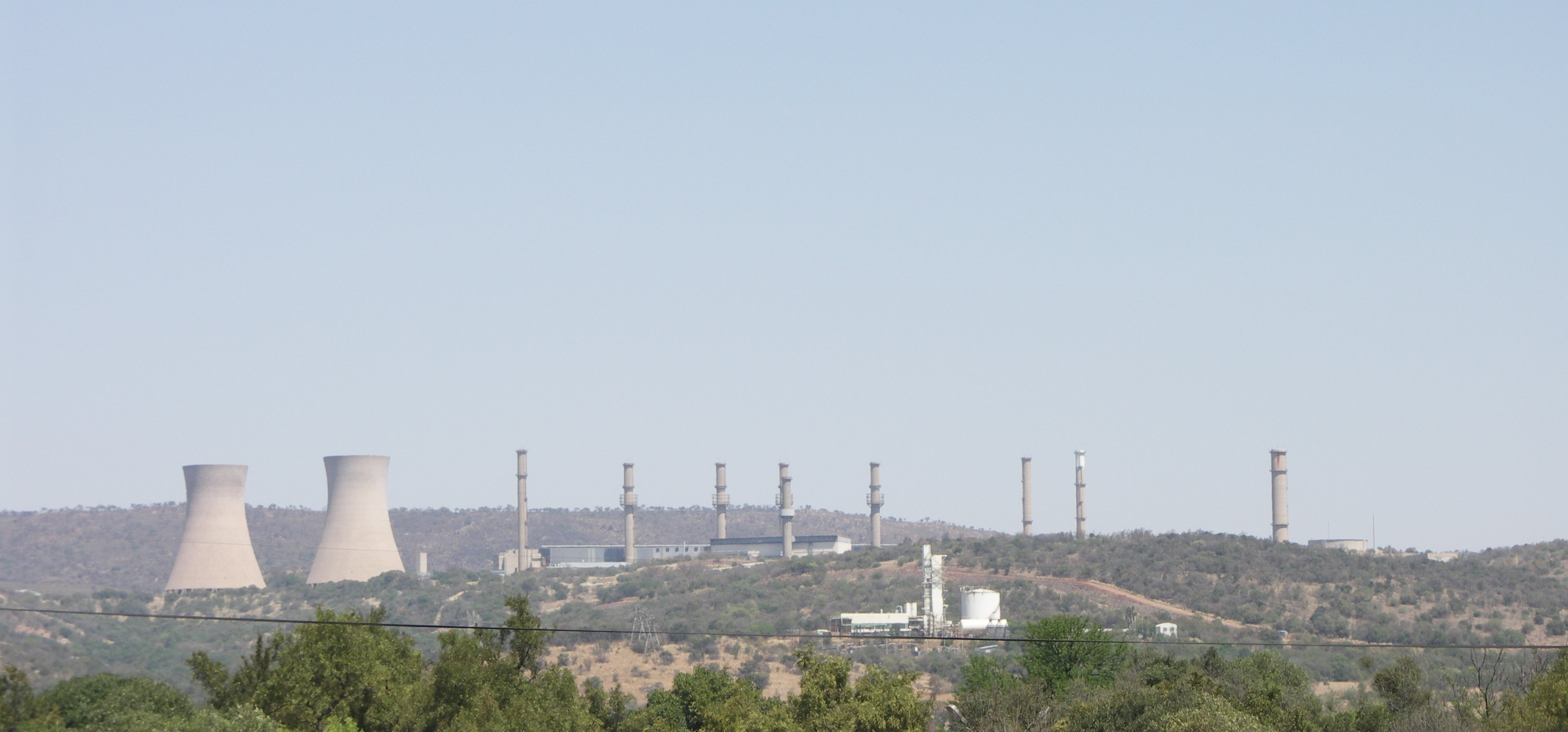
Pelindaba as viewed from the north in 2006

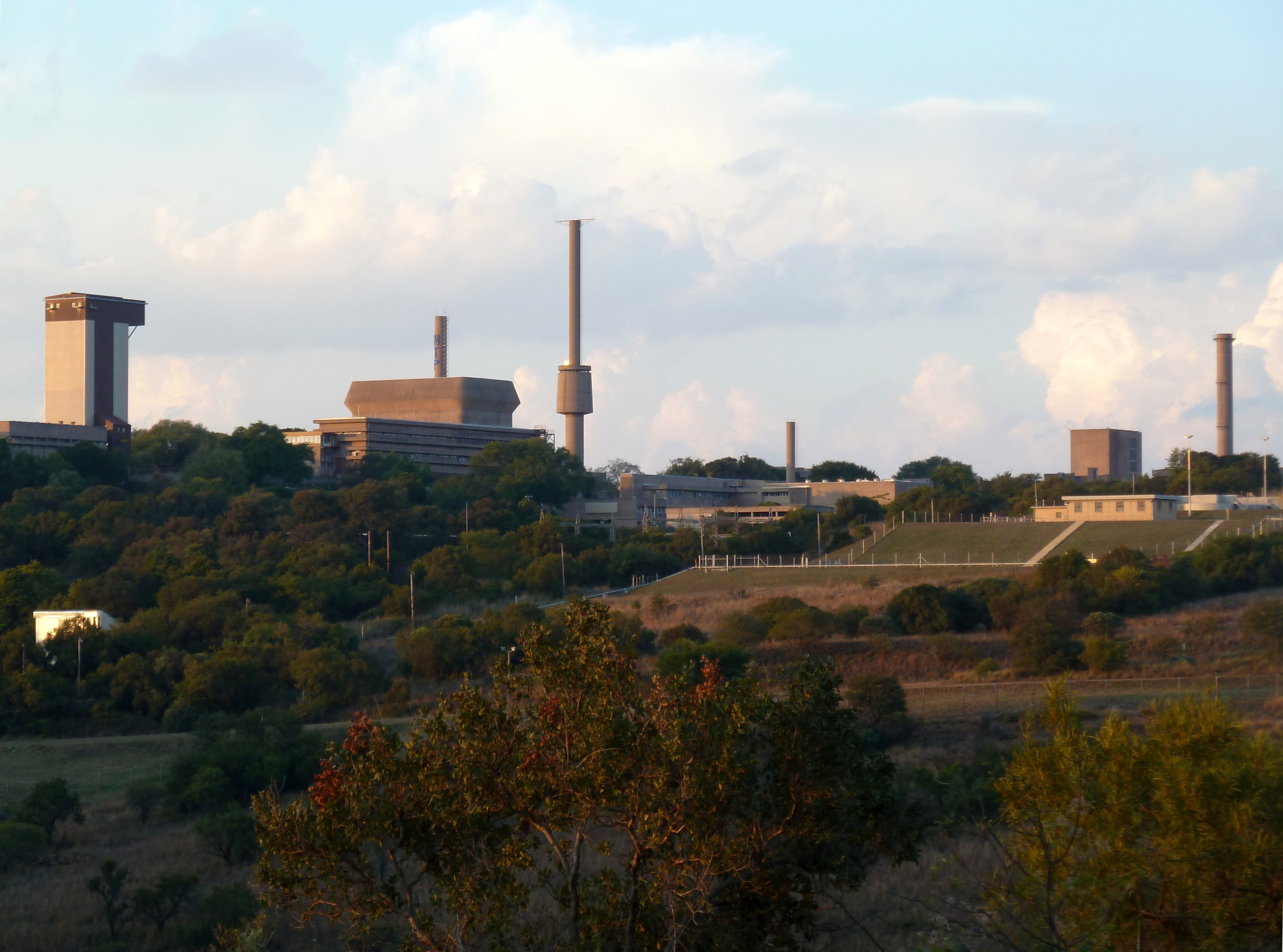
Buildings at Pelindaba. Photo taken in 2013

Pelindaba ("Pelile Ndaba", Zulu for "end of story" or "the conclusion") is South Africa's main nuclear research centre, run by the South African Nuclear Energy Corporation. It is situated south-east of the Hartbeespoort Dam, approximately 33 km (22 miles) west of Pretoria, on the farm that once belonged to Gustav Preller. During the apartheid era, it was the location where South Africa's atomic bombs were partially developed and constructed.

== History ==
The research reactor SAFARI-1 was received from the United States, constructed and inaugurated in 1965. Since then, it has operated with an output of up to 20 MW. The reactor cost $10.5 million. Enriched uranium for use in the reactor was initially supplied by the US and has been subject to IAEA safeguards.

At the time of Pelindaba's inauguration, future cooperation between France and South Africa on nuclear technology was anticipated. That relationship ultimately led to the establishment of the Koeberg Nuclear Power Station.

While the official purpose of the Pelindaba facility was "to harness the versatile power of the atom and apply it to maximum peaceful advantage" it was also speculated that South Africa could produce its own atomic weapons by 1966.

- 1966, Pelindaba reported detecting elevated levels of radiation following French nuclear weapons tests in the Pacific.
- 1970, it was announced that the development of a pilot plant for the enrichment of uranium was under way. Prime Minister John Vorster said of the development that "our sole objective in the development and application of the process is to promote the peaceful application of nuclear energy. Only then can it be to our benefit and to the benefit of mankind." Details of the method of uranium enrichment were withheld as official state secrets.
- 1971, the Chairman of the South African Atomic Energy Board, Abraham J. A. Roux, stated that long hair would not be tolerated in the workplace at Pelindaba.
- 1975, Pelindaba ordered shipments of weapons grade uranium from the US, specified for "peaceful uses only". It was to be supplied on condition that the plutonium produced from its fission be returned to the US. 27 months later, no shipments had been received.
- 1975, Prime Minister John Vorster said that he expected South Africa to have new uranium enrichment capacity by 1983. He stated that while South Africa was seeking international partners in its enrichment program, it would "go it alone" if necessary. The enrichment process developed at Pelindaba promised to provide major efficiency gains over prior centrifugal processes.
- 1977, Finance Minister Owen Horwood stated that his party stood by its assurance that its nuclear program was for peaceful purposes, but also that it reserved the right to use its potential for other-than-peaceful purposes. The same year, The Daily Telegraph reported that South Africa had the capability to make nuclear weapons "any time it wishes."
- 1984, the Associated Press reported that South Africa had refused international inspections of facilities at Pelindaba and associated enrichment works at Valindaba. In 1988, The New York Times reported that the SAFARI-1 reactor at Pelindaba was regularly inspected by the IAEA.
- 1992, it was revealed that the Valindaba facility had enriched uranium for the manufacture of nuclear weapons. The plant was operational from 1975 until 1990.
- 1996, the Associated Press described Pelindaba as the place "once at the heart of South Africa's (nuclear) weapons program".

The South African Nuclear Energy Corporation (NECSA) was established as a public company by the new government of South Africa in 1999.

A 4 MV Van de Graaff particle accelerator operates at Pelindaba for various purposes in nuclear scientific research.

== Incidents ==
=== 1986 fire ===
In 1986, a fire at Pelindaba killed two cleaning staff and injured two other personnel. No radioactive releases occurred during the incident.

=== 1994 theft of residue barrels ===
In August 1994, barrels containing "enriched uranium residue" were stolen from Pelindaba. The theft was detected on 16 August. The contents of 30 barrels were discovered dumped near Pelindaba and as of 4 September, 100 barrels remained missing.

=== 1996 accident ===
An accident at the Pelindaba research facility exposed workers to radiation. Harold Daniels and several others died from radiation burns and cancers related to the exposure.

=== 2007 armed attack ===
Shortly after midnight on 8 November 2007, four armed men entered the facility and headed towards a control room in the eastern block. According to the South African Nuclear Energy Corporation (NECSA), the state-owned entity that runs the facility, the four "technically sophisticated criminals" deactivated several layers of security, including a 10,000-volt electrical fence, suggesting insider knowledge of the system. An off-duty emergency services officer, who was shot by the men after a brief struggle, triggered an alarm, alerting a nearby police station. The four attackers escaped the facility by the same way they had entered after 45 minutes alone in the compound. Though their images were captured on closed-circuit television, they were not detected by security officers because nobody was monitoring the cameras at the time. On 16 November, three suspects, between the ages of 17 and 28, were arrested by local police in connection with the incident but were later released. In response to the attack, NECSA suspended six Pelindaba security personnel, including the general manager of security and promised an "internal investigation which will cover culpability, negligence and improvements of security systems." According to the State Security Agency, China was behind the attacks to steal technology for a pebble bed modular reactor.

=== 2009 leak of radioactive gases ===
On 16 March 2009, a leak of radioactive gases from Pelindaba was reported by NECSA. Abnormal levels of gamma radiation associated with xenon and krypton gases were detected, causing an emergency to be declared. Members of staff were evacuated.

== See also ==
- Treaty of Pelindaba – African Nuclear Weapons Free Zone Treaty
- South Africa and weapons of mass destruction
