= National Nuclear Regulator =

Organization in South Africa

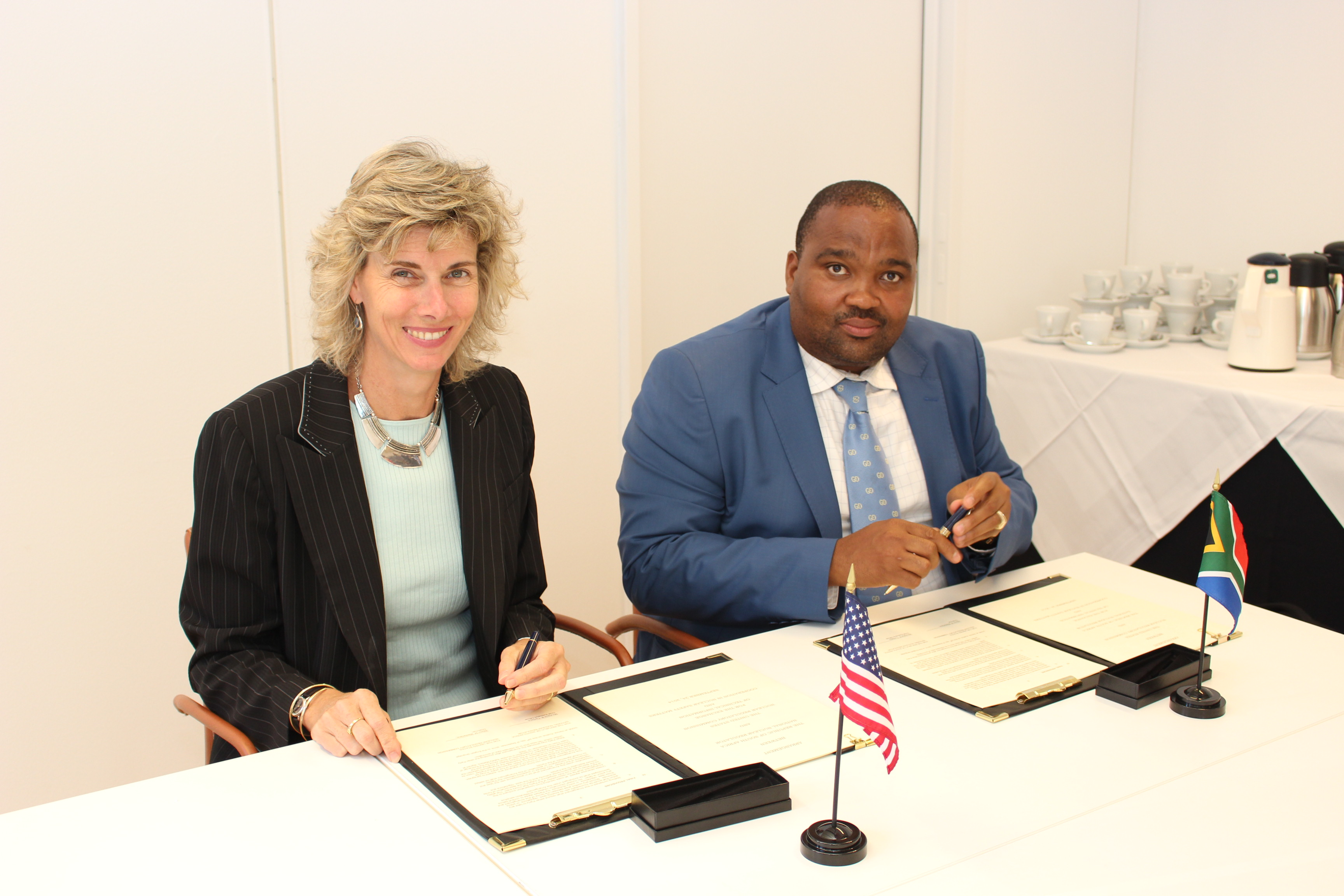
The NNR's CEO, Bismark Tyobeka, and Allison Macfarlane of the NRC sign bilateral arrangements for cooperation at the 58th General Conference of the International Atomic Energy Agency (2014) in Vienna, Austria.

The National Nuclear Regulator (NNR) of South Africa is responsible for the regulatory framework that protects people, property and the environment from any damaging effects of ionizing radiation or radioactive material.

== Duties ==
Its duties include the regulation of safe operating conditions for nuclear or radiation processes and the prevention or mitigation of damage from accidents. It carries out safety case reviews and assessments, authorisations, compliance inspections and enforcement of standards. It drafts regulatory documents and oversees emergency planning and preparedness. Its safety standards are implemented in accordance with the recommendations of the International Commission on Radiological Protection (ICRP) and the International Atomic Energy Agency (IAEA), and it reports to the Department of Energy.

== History ==
In June 2021, Koeberg Alert's Peter Becker was appointed to the board of the National Nuclear Regulator. He was fired by the Minister of Minerals and Energy, Gwede Mantashe, in February 2022, citing Becker's opposition to nuclear power.
