= SAFARI-1 =

South African nuclear research reactor

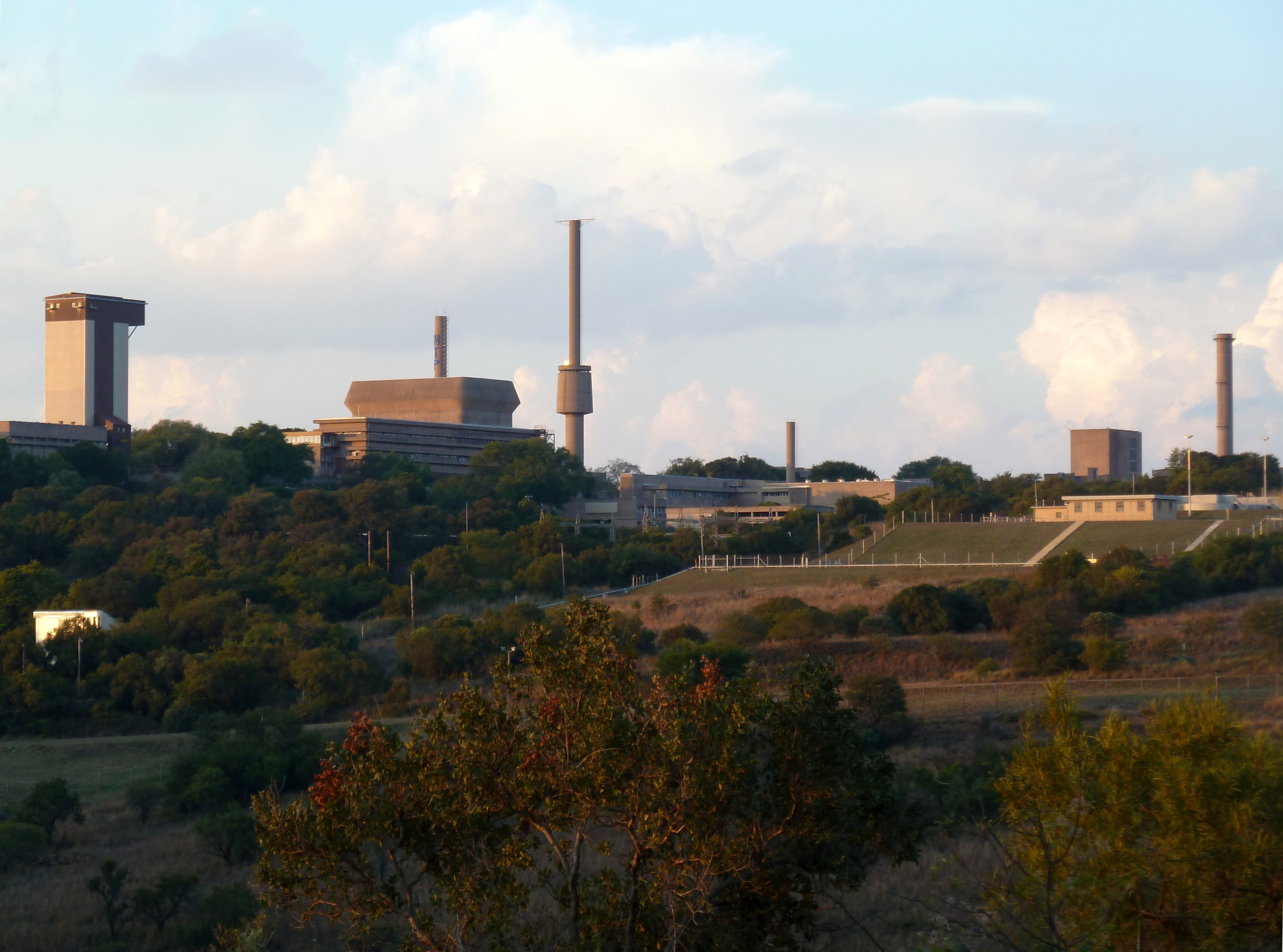
- Buildings housing the SAFARI-1 reactor
- Official name: South African Fundamental Atomic Research Installation 1
- Country: South Africa
- Location: Pelindaba, North West (South African province)
- Coordinates: 25°48′0″S 27°57′0″E
- Status: Operational
- Construction began: 1961
- Commission date: 1965
- Operator: NECSA

Power generation
- Nameplate capacity: 20 MW

External links
- Website: www.necsa.co.za

SAFARI-1 is a 20 MW light water-cooled, beryllium reflected, pool-type research reactor, initially used for high level nuclear physics research programmes and was commissioned in 1965.

The reactor is owned and operated by South African Nuclear Energy Corporation (NECSA) at their facility in Pelindaba, South Africa.

The reactor is a tank in pool type reactor and is designed to run on enriched uranium. Currently the fuel in use is the remains of the decommissioned South African nuclear weapons.

== History ==
The reactor was built in cooperation with the Atoms for Peace program run by the US Dept Of Energy in the 1950s and '60s.

Planning started in 1960 and construction occurred between 1961 and 1965. In March 1965 the reactor was commissioned and initially operated at 6.75 MW, a limitation imposed by the capacity of the secondary cooling circuit. Output was increased to 20 MW in 1968 after the secondary cooling circuit was upgraded.

Initially the reactor was fueled with High Enriched uranium (HEU) supplied by the United States, but in 1975 exports of HEU from the USA to South Africa was suspended in protest of South Africa's nuclear weapons program and the construction of the Valindaba Y-plant. In order to conserve the available fuel supply, reactor output was reduced to 5 MW and operating hours were dramatically reduced

In 1979 the Valindaba Y-plant started producing 45% HEU and in 1981 the first fuel assemblies from Valindaba were made available to fuel SAFARI-1. Operating hours were increased, but power was kept at 5 MW until 1993 when it was increased to 10 MW and eventually 20 MW due to the commercialisation of NECSA operations.

The reactor was shut down for repairs in 1988 after a water leak was detected in the pool.

In 2005 it was announced that the reactor is to be converted from using High Enriched uranium to Low Enriched uranium as fuel.

== Use ==
One of Safari-1s primary uses is the production of radio isotopes for radiopharmacology use in nuclear medicine, specifically the production of molybdenum-99.

Radio isotopes are distributed through NTP Radioisotopes, a subsidiary company of NECSA

== See also ==
- Pelindaba
- South African Nuclear Energy Corporation
- Atoms for Peace
