= Koeberg Nuclear Power Station =

Nuclear power station in Western Cape, South Africa

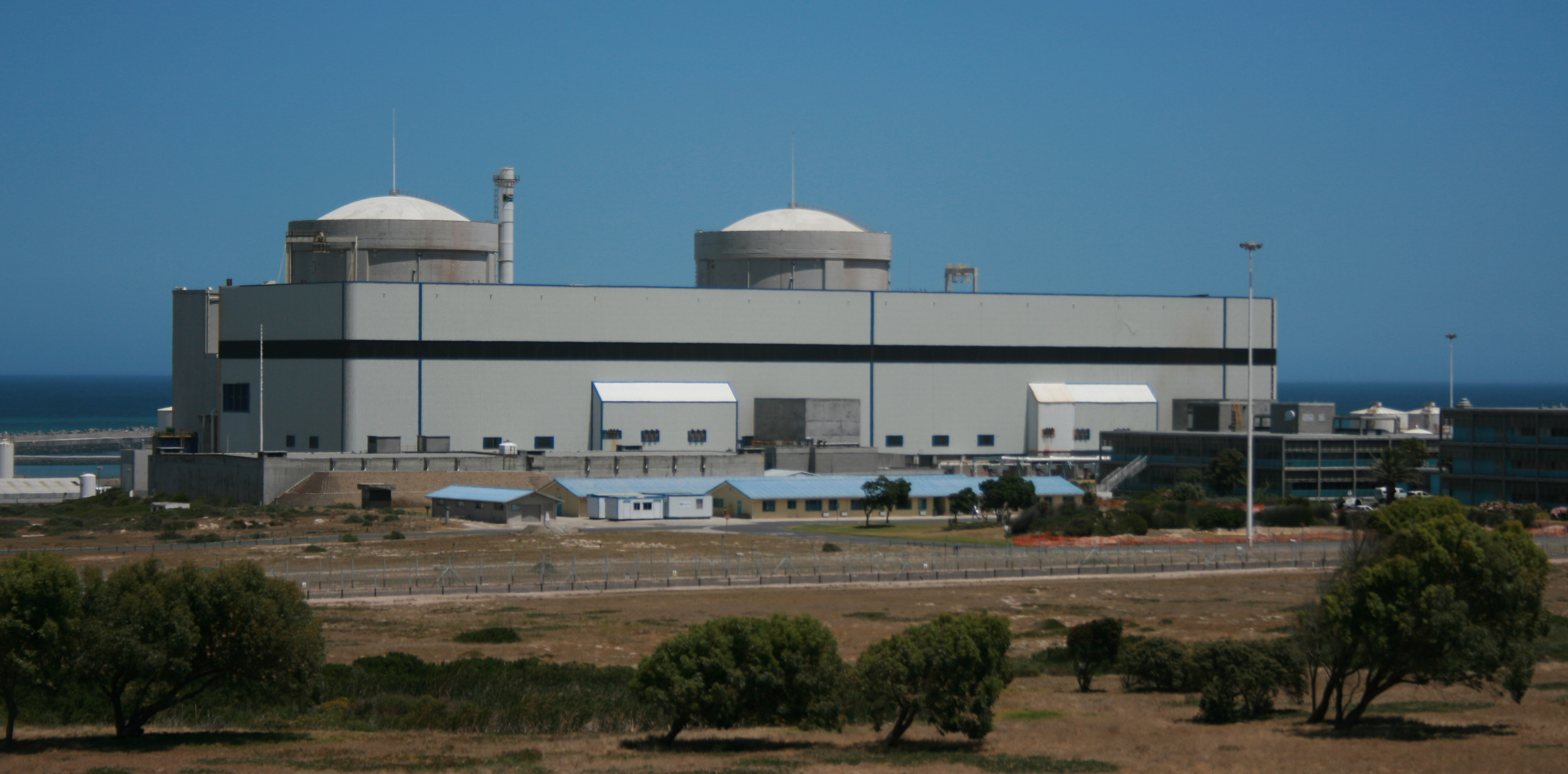
- Koeburg Nuclear Power Station and its two pressurised light-water nuclear reactors
- Country: South Africa
- Location: Melkbosstrand
- Coordinates: 33°40′35.2″S 18°25′55.37″E
- Status: Operational
- Construction began: 1976
- Commission date: 1984
- Owner: Eskom
- Operator: Eskom
- Employees: 1,200

Nuclear power station
- Reactors: 2
- Reactor type: PWR
- Reactor supplier: Framatome

Power generation
- Units operational: 2 x 970 MW
- Make and model: Areva CP-1
- Nameplate capacity: 1,940 MW
- Capacity factor: 80.4%
- Annual net output: 13,668 GW·h

External links
- Website: https://www.eskom.co.za/eskom-divisions/gx/koeberg-nuclear-power-station/
- Commons: Related media on Commons

Koeberg in red with the other potential nuclear sites in blue

Koeberg Nuclear Power Station is a nuclear power station in South Africa and is the only one built on the African continent. It is located 30 km north of Cape Town, near Melkbosstrand on the west coast. It is owned and operated by the country's state-owned electricity public utility, Eskom.

== Design ==
Koeberg contains two pressurised water reactors based on a design by Framatome of France. Framatome has a 51% shareholding in local South African company Lesedi Nuclear Services, which performs upgrade and maintenance projects at Koeberg. Koeberg supplies power to the national grid so that over-capacity can be redistributed to the rest of the country on an as-needed basis. Fuel stock used within the reactor is enriched uranium dioxide pellets containing gadolinium, contained in fuel rods. Koeberg is rated at 1,860 MW, its average annual production is 13,668 GWh and it has two turbine generators.

Each reactor delivers 970 MW (gross) and is capable of delivering 930 MW (net) to the grid.

The power station was constructed near Cape Town to be the sole provider of power in the Western Cape after fossil-fuel power stations were deemed too small and too expensive to be viable. Nuclear power was considered because it was more economical than transporting coal to the existing fossil-fuel power stations, and construction of new fossil-fuel power-stations, which would have required 300 m tall chimneys to comply with clean-air legislation. Athlone Power Station in the city was too small to provide Cape Town's needs, and the Paarden Island power station (also too small) has been demolished.

Koeberg was one of the first nuclear power stations designed to be resistant to earthquakes. The reactors at the Koeberg nuclear power station are built on an aseismic raft designed – on the basis of a mid-1970s hazard study - to withstand a magnitude 7 earthquake at a focal distance of about 10 km, 0.3g zero period ground acceleration (ZPGA). The largest recorded earthquake in the Cape Town area has been 6.5 magnitude at Jan Biesjes Kraal in 1809.

The reactor at Koeberg is cooled by cold water from the Atlantic Ocean pumped through an isolated circuit at 80 tons a second. Low and intermediate level waste from Koeberg is transported by road in steel and concrete containers to a rural disposal site at Vaalputs, 600 km away in the Kalahari Desert.

The power station was originally located outside the metropolitan area, but urban growth in the intervening years has meant that it is now close to suburban housing. To mitigate risks during possible evacuations, the city uses zoning laws to enforce maximum housing density regulations based on evacuation capacity. The buffer zone around the nuclear power station forms the 22 km^{2} (8.5 mi^{2}) Koeberg Nature Reserve, open to the public and containing more than 150 species of birds and a number of mammal species.

== History ==
=== Construction and sabotage ===
Construction of the power station began in 1976, following negotiations with foreign suppliers of nuclear technology. French company Framatome led the construction process. A contract was signed with the United States in 1974 which would have allowed the operator to import nuclear fuel rods. However the administration of US President Jimmy Carter blocked the export of this critical component. The issue was resolved through an agreement to purchase enriched uranium from a consortium of European suppliers.

In December 1982, Koeberg was bombed while it was still under construction. Umkhonto we Sizwe, the armed wing of the African National Congress (ANC), claimed responsibility for the attack. The bombing itself was carried out by a single individual: Rodney Wilkinson, who had previous served in the South African Defence Forces and fought in Angola. Wilkinson, who had previously worked at the Koeberg site during its construction, smuggled a set of plans for the facility to his contacts within the ANC in late 1980.

Following a period of extensive planning for the attack, Wilkinson returned to Koeberg in July 1982 to begin a short-term engineering contract which would provide access to the most secure areas of the facility. On Friday, December 17, 1982, his last day of work at Koeberg, Wilkinson installed and activated four thermite-packed limpet mines with 24-hour time-delayed detonators. Wilkinson had previously smuggled these mines into the power station, one by one, inside of a shoulder bag. Later that day he attended a farewell gathering at the facility with his co-workers and then fled South Africa. The four asynchronous explosions occurred during the weekend, when workers were unlikely to be present inside the facility, and prior to the loading of any uranium fuel into the reactors. As a result, there were no human casualties and no radiological consequences.

The attack was planned and executed with the support of Wilkinson's partner Heather Gray, who married Wilkinson in December 1983. Wilkinson was given amnesty in 1999 by the post-apartheid Truth and Reconciliation Commission and like some other ANC operatives ended up working for the South African government. Renfrew Christie, an ANC operative who had also previously served in the South African Defence Forces, was also noted for providing intelligence that contributed to the planning of the attack.

The bombing was carried out shortly before the plant was expected to become operational. Commissioning of the facility was delayed by nearly 18 months. The damage was estimated to have caused approximately $519 million USD worth of damage at the time (roughly $1.73 billion USD in 2026 dollars) . Unit 1 was synchronized to the grid on 4 April 1984. Unit 2 followed on 25 July 1985.

=== Greenpeace protest ===
In August 2002, twelve Greenpeace activists obtained access to the station. Six of them scaled the wall to hang up an anti-nuclear protest banner. The twelve were arrested and fined.

=== Technical difficulties ===
At the end of 2005, Koeberg started experiencing numerous technical difficulties. On 11 November 2005, a fault on a transmission busbar caused the reactor to go into safe mode, cutting supply to most of the Western Cape for about two hours. On 16 November a fire under a 400 kV transmission line caused the line to trip, causing severe voltage dips which resulted in Koeberg once again shutting down. Parts of the Cape were left without electricity for hours at a time. On the evening of 23 November, a routine inspection of the backup safety system revealed a below-spec concentration of an important chemical, resulting in a controlled shutdown of the reactor. Due to the sufficiency of backup supply, major power cuts were not experienced until Friday 25 November, when the backup capacity began running out. At this point, rotational load shedding was employed, with customers being switched off in stages for most of the day. Koeberg was re-synchronised to the national grid on Saturday 26 November.

On Sunday 25 December 2005, the generator of Unit 1 was damaged. While the generator was being powered up after scheduled refuelling and maintenance, a loose bolt, which was left inside the generator caused severe damage, forcing it to be shut down. Subsequent to the unexpected unavailability of Unit 1, Unit 2 was also brought down for scheduled refuelling, resulting in a severe shortage of supply to the Western Cape. This resulted in widespread load shedding in order to maintain the stability of the network. A replacement rotor for Unit 1 was shipped in from France and the unit was brought back into operation in May 2006.

On 18 and 19 February 2007 large parts of the Western Cape again experienced blackouts due to a controlled shutdown of Koeberg. According to Eskom and the City of Cape Town, power cuts were to continue until 26 February 2007, however power supply problems continued beyond this date.

The estimated economic losses due to the power cuts was over R 500 M as at February 2007, and was estimated to rise to possibly as high as R 2 billion.

=== Accidents and safety ===
On 12 September 2010, 91 members of staff were contaminated with cobalt-58 dust in an incident that appeared confined to the station.

After the 2011 Fukushima Daiichi nuclear disaster, seismic safety at Koeberg was reevaluated in conjunction with the IAEA. Although Koeberg was designed for 0.3g zero period ground acceleration (ZPGA), a magnitude 7 earthquake, stress tests conducted in 2013 evaluated Koeberg against a 0.5g ZPGA. Overall Koeberg was found to be seismically robust and well designed, with some areas for attention and improvement that were highlighted.

=== Extensions of permitted operations ===
In 2019, the South African Government's Integrated Resource Plan (IRP) allowed for a 20-year extension for Koeberg, continuing operations through 2044, and included a delayed new nuclear build program, with a scenario that may involve building new capacity after 2030.

On 10 September 2020, Eskom announced it will replace six steam generators. The design, manufacture and install contract with Areva was for ZAR 4.4 billion ($240 million), with manufacture subcontracted to the Shanghai Electric Power. Installation was delayed to 2023 and 2024 because of concerns about possible power shortages. Koeberg 1's outage began on 10 December 2022 and it came back synchronised with the grid on 18 November 2023, taking much longer than the expected six months. Koeberg 2 will begin its outage once Koeberg 1's recommissioning tests are complete.

In 2022, the Daily Maverick reported that Eskom's then Chief Nuclear Officer, Riedewaan Bakardien had left the utility, also noting an Eskom estimated loss of between 250 and 300 "skilled persons" in 2022, putting at risk the planned R20 billion life extension.

In November 2025, the National Energy Regulator of South Africa (NERSA) granted Koeberg Unit 2 a license to continue operations for a further 20 years (up to 2045).

== Electricity production ==
Production figures are in TWh per year.

View source data.

== New build ==
Duynefontein next door on the northern side of Koeberg is a proposed site for a new nuclear power station.

== Opposition ==
South Africa's nuclear industry has seen opposition, chiefly from environmentalists concerned about safety issues such as radioactive waste, and anti-war activists concerned about nuclear proliferation and use of atomic weapons. Current campaigns against nuclear energy are being run by Earthlife Africa and Koeberg Alert.

== See also ==
- List of nuclear reactors
- List of power stations in South Africa
