= South African Nuclear Energy Corporation =

Public company in South Africa

South African Nuclear Energy Corporation SOC Ltd

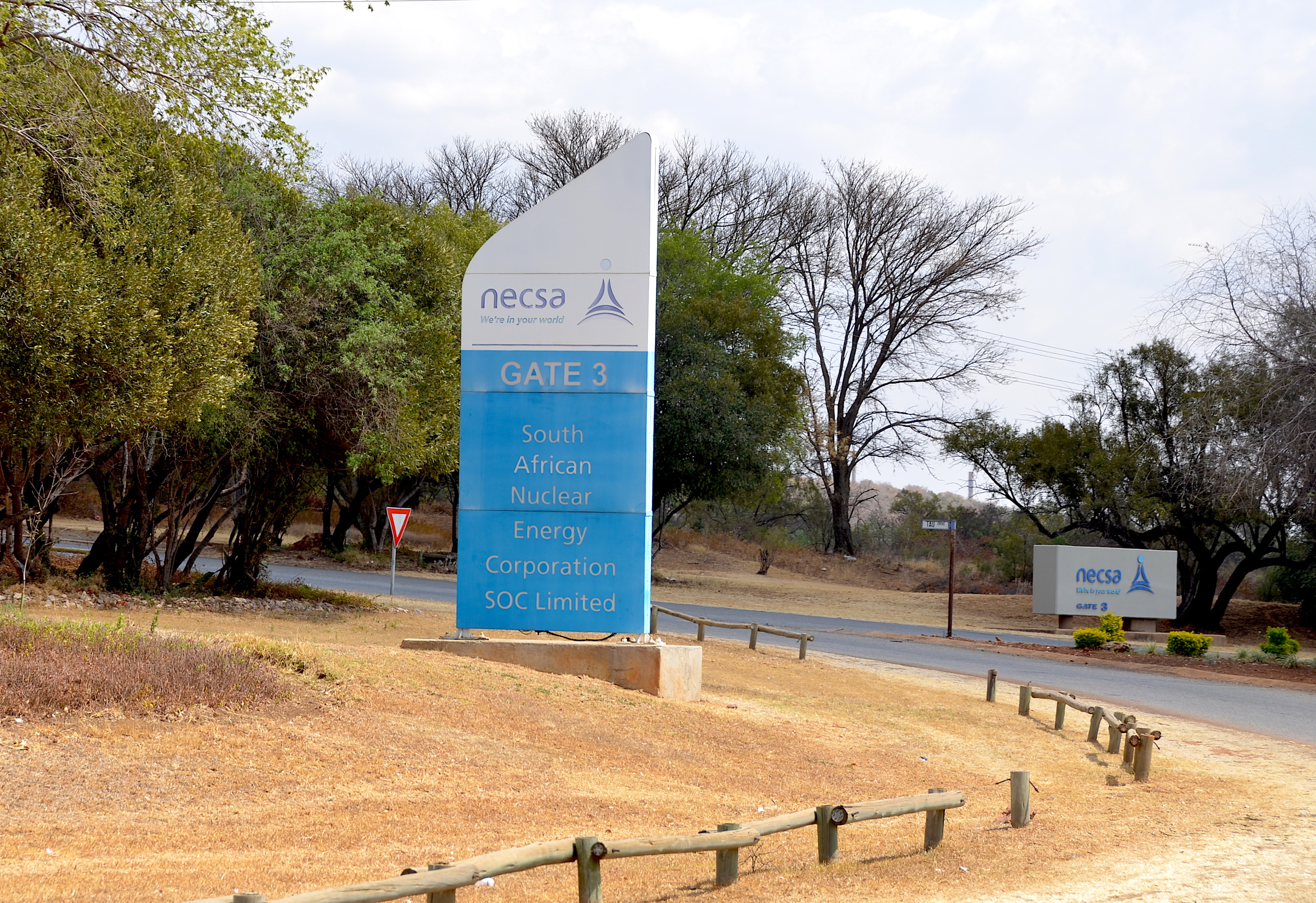
- Pelindaba Nuclear Research Centre (Gate 3)
- Industry: Nuclear
- Founded: Atomic Energy Board 1948; 78 years ago; Atomic Energy Corporation 1982; 44 years ago; South African Nuclear Energy Corporation 1999; 27 years ago
- Headquarters: Ellias Motsoaledi Street Extension (Church Street West), Pelindaba, Madibeng Local Municipality, Bojanala Platinum District Municipality, North West Province, South Africa
- Key people: Loyiso Tyabashe (Group (CEO); David Nicholls; (Necsa Board Chairperson)
- Subsidiaries: NTP Radioisotopes SOC Ltd
- Website: necsa.co.za

The South African Nuclear Energy Corporation (Necsa) was established as a public company by the Republic of South Africa Nuclear Energy Act in 1999 (27 years ago) and is wholly owned by the State.

The name is correctly indicated above, although the sequence of letters in the acronym may be taken as suggesting that the name should be the "Nuclear Energy Corporation of South Africa".

== History ==
In 1948, the Atomic Energy Board (AEB) was established. In 1957, South Africa and the United States signed an agreement to procure a research reactor. In 1970, the Uranium Enrichment Corporation (UCOR) was established. On 1 July 1982, the Nuclear Energy Act (Act 92 of 1982) created the Atomic Energy Corporation (AEC), superseding the former AEB. It became responsible for all nuclear related activities. And on 1 July 1985, the Uranium Enrichment Corporation and Nuclear Development Corporation (NUCOR) was reincorporated into the AEC, having been two separate subsidiary companies created in 1982. The AEC then became the South African Nuclear Energy Corporation in 1999. In 2003, NTP Radioisotopes Group was incorporated as a wholly owned subsidiary of Necsa. In 2007, Pelchem became a wholly owned subsidiary of Necsa.

The 20 MW research reactor SAFARI-1 was initially used for high level nuclear physics research programmes and was commissioned on 18 March 1965. In the 1970s and 1980s, amid reduced output due to embargo of international fuel supply, the focus of activities at Pelindaba was on the exploitation of South Africa's uranium resources through the successful design, construction, and commissioning of commercial uranium hexafluoride, uranium enrichment, and nuclear fuel assembly production facilities. In 1993 focus shifted to commercial operations and over the following years typical output increased back to 20MW. Since 2009 the reactor has operated solely on low enriched uranium fuel.

Mr David Nicholls chairs the Necsa Group board since January 2020 and was reappointed by Minister of Mineral Resources and Energy, Mr Gwede Mantashe in January 2023. The board presence and continuity are accredited for the entity's governance improvement and stability.

In 2021, cabinet approved of a multi-purpose reactor (MPR) which will replace the SAFARI-1.

== Operations ==
Necsa replaced the country's Atomic Energy Corporation. Apart from several ancillary functions, the main functions of Necsa are to undertake and promote research and development in the field of nuclear energy and related technologies; to process and store nuclear material and other restricted material; and to co-ordinate with other organisations in matters falling within these spheres. Apart from its main operations at Pelindaba, Necsa also operates the Vaalputs radioactive waste disposal facility. The corporation also serves the State's other nuclear institutional obligations. The chief executive officer of Necsa is Mr. Loyiso Tyabashe since 1 January 2021.

Necsa has two subsidiaries, which are NTP Radioisotopes SOC is a company that serves the international markets for radiation-based technology and products such as nuclear medicine for diagnosis and treatment of cancer. Pelchem SOC is the second subsidiary which produces fluorochemicals for industrial applications and household.

Necsa employs some 1,700 people in diverse areas such as nuclear physics, engineering, chemistry and electronics. With changes in the country's positioning on nuclear involvement and South Africa's re-entry into world markets in 1990, a decision was taken to focus the organisation on commercially driven projects. Today, Necsa supplies a wide range of products and services to South African and foreign market sectors with the SAFARI-1 reactor as the cornerstone of the commercial isotope production programme. This research reactor at Pelindaba, SAFARI-1 produces medical isotopes such as Molybdenum-99 which are sold globally by the NTP. The NTP Radioisotopes Group had sales of 1.222 billion ZAR (€75M) in 2016.

== See also ==
- Helikon vortex separation process
- Nuclear fuel cycle
- Nuclear reprocessing
- South Africa and weapons of mass destruction
