= South Africa and weapons of mass destruction =

South Africa
- South Africa Territory of South West Africa within South Africa
- Nuclear program start date: 1967
- First nuclear weapon test: Possible, 22 September 1979 (See Vela incident)
- First thermonuclear weapon test: Unknown
- Last nuclear test: Unknown
- Largest yield test: Unknown
- Total tests: Unknown
- Peak stockpile: 6
- Current stockpile: None; the programme was voluntarily dismantled in 1989.
- Maximum missile range: 1,300 kilometres (810 mi) (English Electric Canberra)
- NPT party: Yes

From the 1960s to the 1990s, South Africa pursued research into weapons of mass destruction, including nuclear, biological, and chemical weapons under the apartheid government. South Africa is one of the ten states to ever acquire a nuclear weapons capability, and the only state to relinquish them. (Note: Belarus, Kazakhstan, and Ukraine temporarily held ownership but not operational control of ex-Soviet nuclear weapons, being subnational units of the former USSR, see Soviet Union and weapons of mass destruction.)

South Africa's nuclear weapons doctrine was designed for political leverage rather than actual battlefield use, specifically to induce the United States to intervene in any regional conflicts between South Africa and the Soviet Union or its proxies. To achieve a minimum credible deterrence, a total of six nuclear weapons were covertly assembled by the late 1980s.

Before the anticipated changeover to a majority-elected African National Congress-led government in the 1990s, the South African government dismantled all of its nuclear weapons. The country has been a signatory of the Biological Weapons Convention since 1975, the Treaty on the Non-Proliferation of Nuclear Weapons since 1991, and the Chemical Weapons Convention since 1995. In February 2019, South Africa ratified the Treaty on the Prohibition of Nuclear Weapons, becoming the first country to have had nuclear weapons, disarmed them, and gone on to join the treaty.

== Nuclear weapons ==
The Republic of South Africa's ambitions to develop nuclear weapons began in 1948 after giving commission to South African Atomic Energy Corporation (SAAEC), the forerunner corporation to oversee the nation's uranium mining and industrial trade.

In 1957, South Africa reached an understanding with the United States after signing a 50-year collaboration under the U.S.-sanctioned programme, Atoms for Peace. The treaty concluded the South African acquisition of a single nuclear research reactor and an accompanying supply of highly enriched uranium (HEU) fuel, located in Pelindaba.

=== Research programs ===
In 1965, the U.S. subsidiary, the Allis-Chalmers Corporation, delivered the 20 MW research nuclear reactor, SAFARI-1, along with ~90% HEU fuel to South African nuclear authority. In 1967, South Africa decided to pursue plutonium capability and constructed its own reactor, SAFARI-2 reactor also at Pelindaba, that went critical using 606 kg of 2% enriched uranium fuel, and 5.4 tonnes of heavy water, both supplied by the United States.

The SAFARI-2 reactor was intended to be moderated by heavy water, fuelled by natural uranium while the reactor's cooling system used molten sodium. In 1969, the project was abandoned by the South African government because the reactor was draining resources from the uranium enrichment program that had begun in 1967. South Africa began to focus on the success of its uranium enrichment programme which was seen by its scientists as easier compared to plutonium.

South Africa was able to mine uranium ore domestically, and used aerodynamic nozzle enrichment techniques to produce weapons-grade material. In 1969, a pair of senior South African scientists met with Sultan Bashiruddin Mahmood, a nuclear engineer from Pakistan based at the University of Birmingham, to conduct studies, research and independent experiments on uranium enrichment.

The South African and Pakistani scientists studied the use of aerodynamic-jet nozzle process to enrich the fuel at the University of Birmingham, later building their national programs in the 1970s.

South Africa gained sufficient experience with nuclear technology to capitalise on the promotion of the U.S. government's Peaceful Nuclear Explosions (PNE) program. Finally in 1971, South African minister of mines Carel de Wet gave approval of the country's own PNE programme with the publicly stated objective of using PNEs in the mining industry.

The date when the South African PNE programme transformed into a weapons program is a matter of some dispute. The possibility of South Africa collaborating with France and Israel in the development of nuclear weapons was the subject of speculation during the 1970s. In 2010, declassified documents revealed secret meetings between P. W. Botha and Shimon Peres on 31 March 1975 and 30 June 1975, where PW Botha requested nuclear warheads be attached to the Jericho missiles South Africa was purchasing.

=== Nuclear weapons strategy ===
Unlike many other countries' nuclear weapons doctrine, South Africa's strategy anticipated no actual battlefield use of nuclear weapons. Although the weapons were intended to be used as a basis for a bluff of its antagonists, South Africa had to be perceived as having the means and resolve to use nuclear weapons in a military conflict. The goal was not to be involved in a nuclear war that South Africa could not survive; the goal was to deter the potential aggression of the country's enemies.

South Africa's doctrine for the use of nuclear weapons did not endorse the deployment of the arms in combat, but rather it proposed that the threat of the country's deployment of a nuclear arsenal could be used as political tool.

Such a capability could be used to manipulate other, allied Western powers (primarily the United States) to assist South Africa against any overwhelming military threat to its sovereignty, such as if Soviet-backed forces were to overrun South African Defence Forces in Angola and then invade South Africa itself. If the South African government found political and military instability in southern Africa to be unmanageable, it might then demonstrate its nuclear capability—such as by conducting an underground nuclear weapons test in the Kalahari Desert.

This would provoke the Soviet Union to escalate its confrontation with the United States until South Africa was constrained, which would mean American intervention to seek an end to the conflict in Angola.

In 1978, the South African Defence Force Chief of Staff for Planning Army Brigadier John Huyser produced a confidential memorandum which outlined potential elements of a nuclear strategy:

- Five to six nuclear weapons would be developed and kept "on the shelf"
- Should the South African Defence Forces find itself in a situation where its conventional forces were facing a catastrophic defeat, information that confirmed South Africa's possession of nuclear weapons would be conveyed to Western countries (primarily the United States) in a covert manner
- If this did not alleviate the problem, an underground test would be performed to demonstrate South Africa's nuclear capability
- If the threat still persisted, the conduct of an above-ground nuclear weapons test

In November 1986, South African Minister of Defense Magnus Malan secretly approved the "Kramat Capability" document, which set out an official national nuclear strategy for the first time. The strategy was to apply three successive phases of deterrence:

- Phase 1: Strategic Uncertainty - official denial of nuclear capability
- Phase 2: Covert Condition - nuclear capability covertly revealed, as a means of inducement, persuasion, and coercion
- Phase 3: Overt Deterrent - consideration of the following:
1. Overt announcement
2. Display of force
3. Demonstration (underground or atmospheric test explosion)
4. Threatened use
5. Battlefield application as deterrent against conventional assault forces

The document also stated: "In order to carry out this strategy with credibility, the following weapon systems are required:"

- A battle-ready air-launched weapon for use in an atmospheric demonstration test
- An explosive device for use in an underground demonstration test
- A long-range ballistic missile to threaten strategic use

The "Strategic Uncertainty" phase would include a policy of deliberate ambiguity, with South Africa neither affirming or denying its nuclear capabilities. South African politicians would also leak information to create uncertainty and worry South Africa's rivals.

The "Covert Condition" phase would occur if South African territorial integrity was threatened by the Soviet Union or Soviet-backed forces. South Africa would covertly inform leading Western governments (particularly the United States and the United Kingdom) about the existence of its nuclear arsenal and request their assistance to eliminate the military threat it faced.

Finally, the "Overt Deterrent" phase outlined a series of successive escalations that would force the United States and other leading Western countries to intervene on behalf of South Africa to stop whatever war in which the country was involved.

This phase would include the following steps: It would begin with a public announcement of the existence of a nuclear arsenal; foreign experts would be invited to inspect the warheads and their delivery systems, to confirm that they were viable for battlefield use; an underground nuclear test would be conducted; there would be an atmospheric test from an air-launched weapon, hundreds of miles from the coast of South Africa; finally, the country would carry out a nuclear strike on enemy forces that were marshaling for a conventional military attack on South African territory.

=== Nuclear weapons production ===
The South African covert nuclear weapons production line and high security storage vaults were located in the Kentron Circle building on the Gerotek vehicle testing facility owned by Armscor on the outskirts of Pretoria. At its secret opening ceremony on 4 May 1981, Prime Minister P.W. Botha described the nuclear deterrent as a "political weapons system" rather than a military one, as it would primarily be used for leverage in international negotiations.

"The time has come when the South African "Ploughshare" must be forged into a sword, for the battle that awaits ... a weapon of inducement, persuasion, and compulsion in the hands of the leaders of the world. This political weapon opens a new possibility, the option for the Republic of South Africa to stipulate its birthright at the negotiating table of the Greats, with nuclear deterrence strategy as its foundation.

— Prime Minister P.W. Botha speech at the opening of the Kentron Circle covert nuclear weapons facility in May 1981

South Africa developed a small finite deterrence arsenal of gun-type fission weapons in the 1980s. Six were constructed and another was under construction at the time the programme ended.

As the final production model contained a relatively large amount of highly enriched uranium (HEU), much effort was expended to ensure the physical safety of the nuclear warheads, with Armscor technicians creating many safety features.

The cornerstone control feature was for each nuclear device to be divided into two subsections, a Front End and a Back End, with the HEU split between the two. This enabled strict security procedures to be enforced, such as storing each subsection in separate vaults with different codes for each door, which were intended to help prevent anyone from having easy access to an entire weapon system.

Nuclear weapon storage vaults in the Kentron Circle building

The fully assembled gun-type devices had enough HEU that they were near critical mass after final assembly. A major safety concern was the Back End propellant could prematurely fire, sending the projectile into the Front End and causing an accidental nuclear explosion. Another potential danger was the projectile accidentally sliding down the barrel, which at a minimum would cause a criticality accident and contaminate the immediate area.

To prevent this, only after the device was armed and ready for use would the barrel rotate to line up the openings correctly. The barrel also contained holes to dissipate the pressure of the propellant firing, thus reducing the speed of the projectile, that were only closed after the weapon was armed and ready for use.

South Africa only produced an operational weapon after Armscor took over production. In 1982, Armscor built the first operational weapon, code-named Hobo and later called Cabot. This device reportedly had a yield of 6 kilotons of TNT. It was eventually disassembled and the warhead reused in a production model bomb. Armscor then built a series of pre-production and production models under the code-name Hamerkop (after the bird). While Hobo/Cabot were not functional, the Hamerkop series were smart television-guided glide bombs.

Bomb casings at South Africa's abandoned Circle nuclear bomb production facility near Pretoria. These most likely would have accommodated a gun-type nuclear package for air delivery

=== Testing the first device ===
The South African Atomic Energy Board (AEB) selected a test site in the Kalahari Desert at the Vastrap weapons range north of Upington. Two test shafts were completed in 1976 and 1977. One shaft was 385 metres deep, the other, 216 metres. In 1977, the AEB established its own high-security weapons research and development facilities at Pelindaba, and during that year the program was transferred from Somchem to Pelindaba.

In mid-1977, the AEB produced a gun-type device—without a highly enriched uranium (HEU) core. Although the Y-Plant was operating, it had not yet produced enough weapons-grade uranium for a device. As has happened in programmes in other nations, the development of the devices had outpaced the production of the fissile material.

Atomic Energy Commission officials say that a "cold test" (a test without uranium-235) was planned for August 1977. An Armscor official who was not involved at the time said that the test would have been a fully instrumented underground test, with a dummy core. Its major purpose was to test the logistical plans for an actual detonation.

How that test was cancelled has been well publicised. Soviet intelligence detected test preparations and in early August alerted the United States; US intelligence confirmed the existence of the test site with an overflight of a Lockheed SR-71 spy plane. On 28 August, The Washington Post quoted a US official: "I'd say we were 99 percent certain that the construction was preparation for an atomic test."

The Soviet and Western governments were convinced that South Africa was preparing for a full-scale nuclear test. During the next two weeks in August, the Western nations pressed South Africa not to test. French foreign minister Louis de Guiringaud warned on 22 August of "grave consequences" for French-South African relations. Although he did not elaborate, his statement implied that France was willing to cancel its contract to provide South Africa with the Koeberg nuclear power reactors.

In 1993, Wynand de Villiers said that when the test site was exposed, he ordered its immediate shutdown. The site was abandoned and the holes sealed. One of the shafts was temporarily reopened in 1988 in preparation for another test, which did not take place; the move was intended to strengthen South Africa's bargaining position during negotiations to end the war with Angola and Cuba.

=== Viable delivery ===
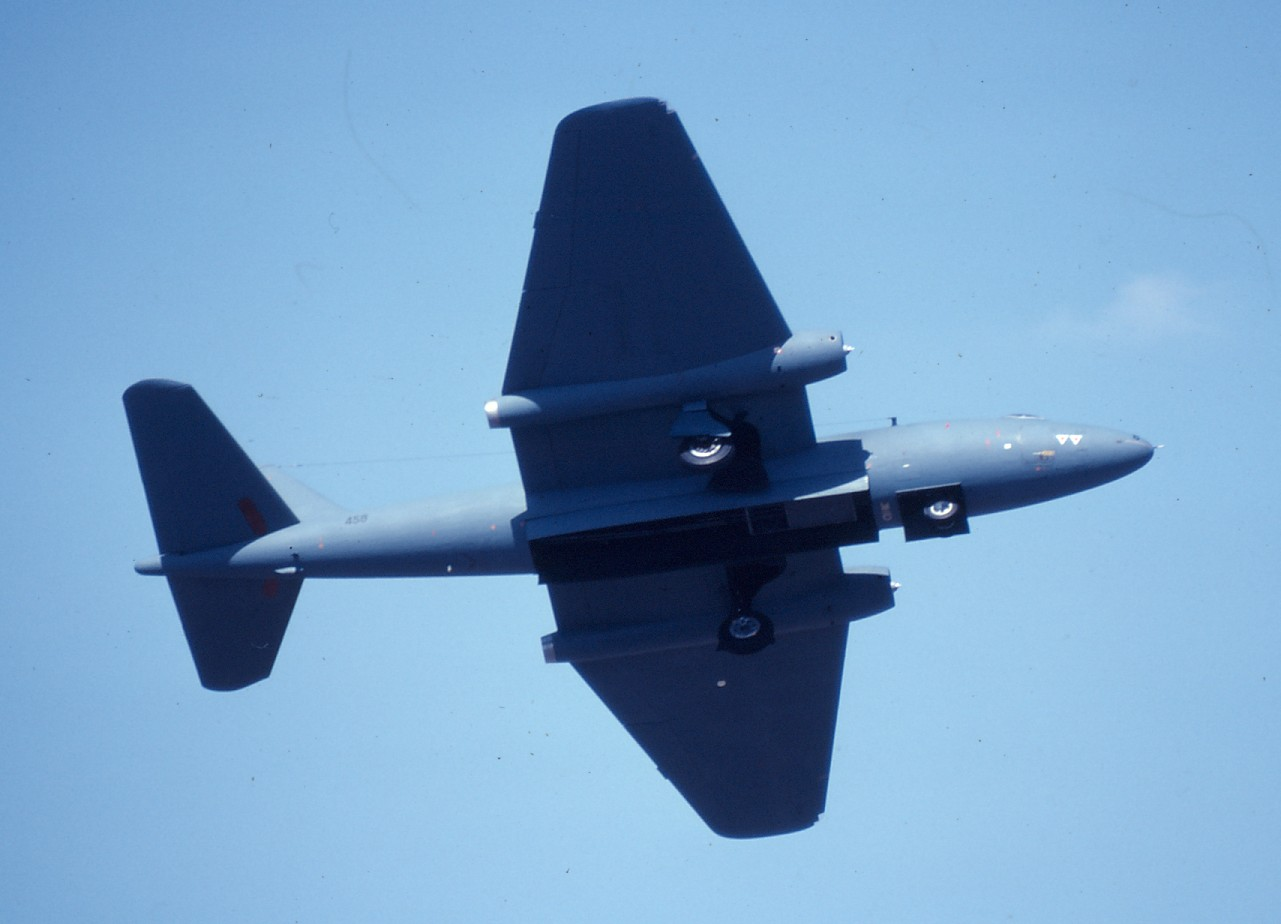
A SAAF Canberra T.4

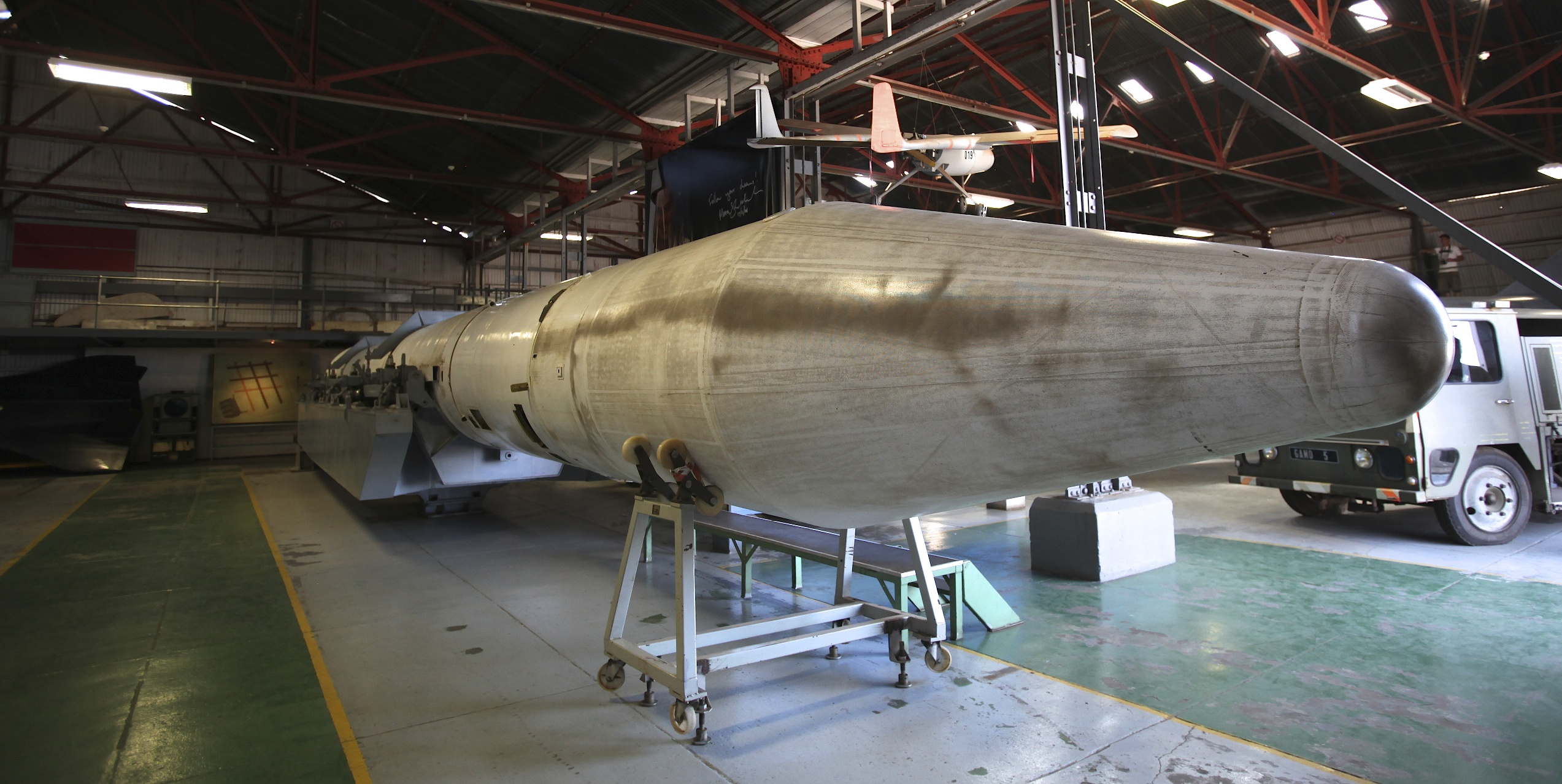
An RSA-3 3 stage LEO rocket

The warheads were originally configured to be delivered from one of several aircraft types then in service with the South African Air Force (SAAF), including the Canberra B12 and the Hawker Siddeley Buccaneer. Concerns about the vulnerability of the ageing aircraft to the Cuban anti-aircraft defence network in Angola subsequently led the SADF to investigate missile-based delivery systems.

The missiles were to be based on the RSA-3 and RSA-4 launchers that had already been built and tested for the South African space programme. According to Al J Venter, author of How South Africa Built Six Atom Bombs, these missiles were incompatible with the available large South African nuclear warheads. Venter claims that the RSA series, being designed for a 340 kg payload, would suggest a warhead of some 200 kg, "well beyond SA's best efforts of the late 1980s."

Venter's analysis is that the RSA series was intended to display a credible delivery system combined with a separate nuclear test in a final diplomatic appeal to the world powers in an emergency even though they were never intended to be used in a weaponized system together.

Three rockets had already been launched into suborbital trajectories in the late 1980s in support of development of the RSA-3 launched Greensat Orbital Management System (for commercial satellite applications of vehicle tracking and regional planning).

Following the decision in 1989 to cancel the nuclear weapons program, the missile programs were allowed to continue until 1992, when military funding ended, and all ballistic missile work was stopped by mid-1993. In order to join the Missile Technology Control Regime, the government had to allow American supervision of the destruction of key facilities applicable to both the long-range missile and the space launch programmes.

=== Collaboration with Israel ===
David Albright and Chris McGreal reported that South African projects to develop nuclear weapons during the 1970s and 1980s were undertaken with long-term cooperation from Israel. The United Nations Security Council Resolution 418 of 4 November 1977 introduced a mandatory arms embargo against South Africa, also requiring all states to refrain from "any co-operation with South Africa in the manufacture and development of nuclear weapons". The United Nations Security Council Resolution 418 of 4 November 1977 introduced a mandatory arms embargo against South Africa, also requiring all states to refrain from "any co-operation with South Africa in the manufacture and development of nuclear weapons".

According to the Nuclear Threat Initiative, in 1977 Israel traded 30 grams of tritium for 50 tonnes of South African uranium, and in the mid-1980s assisted with the development of the RSA-3 and RSA-4 ballistic missiles, which are similar to the Israeli Shavit and Jericho missiles. Also in 1977, according to foreign press reports, it was suspected that South Africa signed a pact with Israel that included the transfer of military technology and the manufacture of at least six nuclear bombs.

In September 1979, a US Vela satellite detected a double flash over the Indian Ocean that was suspected, but never confirmed, to be a nuclear test, despite extensive air sampling by WC-135 aircraft of the United States Air Force. If the Vela incident was a nuclear test, South Africa is virtually the only possible country, potentially in collaboration with Israel, which could have carried it out. No official confirmation of its being a nuclear test has been made by South Africa. In 1997, South African Deputy Foreign Minister Aziz Pahad stated that South Africa had conducted a test, but later retracted his statement as being a report of rumours.

In February 1994, Commodore Dieter Gerhardt, former commander of South Africa's Simon's Town naval base who was later convicted of spying for the USSR, was reported to have said:

Although I was not directly involved in planning or carrying out the operation, I learned unofficially that the flash was produced by an Israeli-South African test code-named Operation Phoenix. The explosion was clean and was not supposed to be detected. But they were not as smart as they thought, and the weather changed – so the Americans were able to pick it up

In 2000, Gerhardt said that Israel agreed in 1974 to arm eight Jericho II missiles with "special warheads" for South Africa.

In 2010, The Guardian released South African government documents that confirmed the existence of Israel's nuclear arsenal. According to The Guardian, the documents were associated with an Israeli offer to sell South Africa nuclear weapons in 1975. Israel categorically denied these allegations and claimed the documents do not indicate any offer for a sale of nuclear weapons. Israeli President Shimon Peres claimed that The Guardian article was based on "selective interpretation... and not on concrete facts." Avner Cohen, author of Israel and the Bomb and The Worst-Kept Secret: Israel's Bargain with the Bomb, said "Nothing in the documents suggests there was an actual offer by Israel to sell nuclear weapons to the regime in Pretoria."

=== Collaboration with Taiwan ===
According to David Albright and Andrea Strickner, South Africa also engaged in close, long-term cooperation with Taiwan, which at the time was controlled by the autocratic Kuomintang regime, sometimes along with the Israelis. Taiwan bought 100 tons of uranium metal from South Africa which was delivered between 1973 and 1974.

In 1980 the Taiwanese contracted for 4,000 tons of uranium metal although it is not known how much of this order was ever delivered. In 1983 Taiwan and South Africa agreed to cooperate on laser enrichment, chemical enrichment, and building a small reactor. The South African reactor program was slowed down in 1985 due to budget cuts and was cancelled completely half a decade later. The enrichment programs also likely ended around this time.

=== Dismantling ===
South African forces feared the threat of a "domino effect" in favour of communism, represented in southern Africa by Cuban forces in Angola, aiding Angolan Marxist-Leninist revolutionary groups against rivals supported by South African forces, and threatening Namibia. In 1988, South Africa signed the Tripartite Accord with Cuba and Angola, which led to the withdrawal of South African and Cuban troops from Angola and independence for Namibia.

The pre-emptive elimination of nuclear weapons was expected to make a significant contribution toward regional stability and peace, and also to help restore South Africa's credibility in regional and international politics. F.W. de Klerk saw the presence of nuclear weapons in South Africa as a problem. F. W. de Klerk disclosed the information about his weapons to the United States in an effort to get the weapons removed.

South Africa ended its nuclear weapons programme in 1989. All the bombs (six constructed and one under construction) were dismantled and South Africa acceded to the Treaty on the Non-Proliferation of Nuclear Weapons in 1991. On 19 August 1994, after completing its inspection, the International Atomic Energy Agency (IAEA) confirmed that one partially completed and six fully completed nuclear weapons had been dismantled.

As a result, the IAEA was satisfied that South Africa's nuclear programme had been converted to peaceful applications. Following this, South Africa joined the Nuclear Suppliers Group (NSG) as a full member on 5 April 1995. South Africa played a leading role in the establishment of the African Nuclear-Weapon-Free Zone Treaty (also referred to as the Treaty of Pelindaba) in 1996, becoming one of the first members in 1997. South Africa also signed the Comprehensive Nuclear-Test-Ban Treaty in 1996 and ratified it in 1999.

In 1993, Bill Keller of The New York Times reported that popular suspicion in Southern African nations held that the timing of disarmament indicated a desire to prevent a nuclear arsenal from falling into the hands of a native African and Coloured government with the collapse of the Apartheid system controlled by ancestral European settlers. De Klerk denied such a motivation when asked about this in a 2017 interview. The African National Congress political party, which took power in South Africa after Apartheid, approved of nuclear disarmament.

The Treaty of Pelindaba came into effect on 15 July 2009 once it had been ratified by 28 countries. This treaty requires that parties will not engage in the research, development, manufacture, stockpiling acquisition, testing, possession, control or stationing of nuclear explosive devices in the territory of parties to the treaty and the dumping of radioactive wastes in the African zone by treaty parties. The African Commission on Nuclear Energy, in order to verify compliance with the treaty, has been established and will be headquartered in South Africa.

South Africa signed the Treaty on the Prohibition of Nuclear Weapons on 20 September 2017, and ratified it on 25 February 2019.

==== Weapons grade uranium stores ====
As of 2015, South Africa still possessed most of the weapons grade uranium extracted from its nuclear weapons, and had used some of it to produce medical isotopes. There had been three security breaches at Pelindaba since the end of Apartheid, with a 2007 breach described by a former US official as being "horrifying", although the South African government dismissed the 2007 breach as a "routine burglary".

Timeline of South African nuclear weapons programme
Year	Activity
1950s and 1960s	Scientific work on the feasibility of peaceful nuclear explosives and support to nuclear power production efforts
1969	Atomic Energy Board forms group to evaluate technical and economic aspects of nuclear explosives
1970	Atomic Energy Commission (AEC) releases report identifying uses for nuclear explosives
1971	R&D approval granted for "peaceful use of nuclear explosives"
1973	AEC prioritises work on a gun-type design
1974	Work on a nuclear device and the Vastrap test site are authorised
1977	AEC completes bomb assembly for "cold" test
1978	First HEU produced; Armscor assumes control of weapons programme
1979	Vela incident; First bomb with HEU core produced by AEC
1982	First deliverable bomb built; work on weapons safety
1985	Three-phase nuclear strategy reviewed
1987	First production bomb built; seven produced, with an eighth under construction
1988	Armscor prepares Vastrap for a nuclear test
1989	Nuclear weapons dismantled
1991	Accedes to NPT

== Biological and chemical weapons ==
In October 1998, the report of the South African Truth and Reconciliation Commission publicly revealed Project Coast, a clandestine government chemical and biological warfare program conducted during the 1980s and 1990s. Project Coast was initiated in 1981 and initially, defensive aspects were the prime objective but as time progressed, offensive programmes became more pervasive and more important.

It became the sole programme for the creation of a range of chemical and biological agents for offensive and defensive use within South Africa as well as neighbouring territories. Two categories of offensive products were developed:

- weapons for mass destruction; here the research focused mostly on biological development processes, especially for run-of-the-mill bacteria including anthrax, tetanus, cholera and especially food poisoning agents such as salmonella bacteria.
- secondly, researching and developing weapons in the "dirty tricks" program, where products could be supplied for individual assassinations. These consisted of toxins in chemical, plant and in biological nature.

On the defensive side, Project Coast oversaw research into the development of agents to protect troops in battle and VIPs against chemical or biological attack. The project was also tasked with developing CS and CR gas agents for crowd control, developing defensive training programs for troops and developing protective clothing.

The program reported to the South African Defence Force Surgeon General (Maj. Gen. N. J. Nieuwoudt (1980-1988) and Maj. Gen. D.P. Knobel (1988–1998)). Nieuwoudt recruited South African cardiologist and army officer Brig. Wouter Basson (1981–1992) as Project Officer and ultimately Nieuwoudt and Basson recruited a large contingent of medical professionals, scientists and weapons specialists to research and develop these weapons and associated antidotes.

Basson was replaced by Col. Ben Steyn in 1992 (1992–1995). Several front companies were created, including Delta G Scientific Company, Protechnik and Roodeplaat Research Laboratories to facilitate the research and development of chemical and biological weapons.

After Basson's arrest in 1997, documents found in his possession revealed that the "dirty-tricks" products included anthrax-laced cigarettes, household items contaminated with organophosphates and paraoxon-laced gin and whisky. Other unverified claims include that a so-called infertility toxin was introduced into black townships, and that cholera was deliberately introduced into the water sources of some South African villages. It was also claimed that South Africa supplied anthrax and cholera to government troops in Rhodesia (now Zimbabwe), which it is alleged were used against guerrillas there.

In January 1992, the government of Mozambique alleged that either South Africa, or South African backed RENAMO forces deployed an artillery-delivered airburst chemical weapon during a battle at a rebel base in Tete province. Five soldiers were said to have died, and many more were injured. South African military and civilian doctors collected samples from the Mozambican government, and denied any involvement in the matter. The programme operated until 1993.

== See also ==
- Project Coast
- History of biological warfare
- Helikon vortex separation process
- Military history of South Africa
- Nuclear weapons of Israel
- Denel Overberg Test Range
- Cold War
- South African Institute for Maritime Research
