= Roodeplaat Research Laboratories =

South African front company

Coordinates: 25°36′54″S 28°21′55″E

- Headquarters: South Africa

Roodeplaat Research Laboratories (RRL) (Afrikaans: Roodeplaat Navorsings Laboratoriums) was a front company established in 1983 by the South African Defence Force to research, test and produce biological weapons within a covert operation known as Project Coast.

The Agricultural Research Council - Plant Protection Research Institute is now situated on this location.

== Founding - Project Coast ==
RRL, as the research facility was commonly known, was founded in April 1982 as part of the top-secret biological and chemical weapons program known as Project Coast. This was illegal, being in violation of the international Biological and Toxin Weapons Convention (BTWC). Project Coast was only publicly revealed in October 1998, in the report of the South African Truth and Reconciliation Commission.

RRL was located north of the Roodeplaat Dam near Pretoria, next to an agricultural research station, so as not to attract attention. Daan Goosen was executive director until 1986, when he was fired for alleged breach of secrecy. Wynand Swanepoel, a dentist in the special forces, took over his post. The auditor of finances Pierre Theron was appointed personally by the then Prime Minister Pieter Willem Botha. All RRL front companies were subordinate to the South African Defence Forces (SADF) and were headed by chemical and biological weaponeer Wouter Basson.

== Secret mission to develop weapons ==
Initially, defensive chemical and biological warfare agents were to be developed and tested in animal experiments in order to better protect the armed forces fighting in the South African Border War in Namibia and Angola against SWAPO freedom fighters and the communist MPLA. Very soon, however, the order came to research offensive warfare agents and to develop deadly poisons that would not be detectable in an autopsy.

The laboratories were not fully operational until 1985 and some also had biological safety level 3. Among other things, brodifacoum, paraoxon, ionophore antibiotics and the nerve agents sarin, tabun and VX were researched.

In 1987, an expansion of the research area was discussed. Production units for anthrax, aflatoxins, botulinum toxin and tetanus toxin, to name just a few, were discussed. These expansion plans, including the construction of a BSL-4 laboratory, were never realized.

To keep up appearances, RRL also conducted contract research for the pharmaceutical, agricultural and medical sectors. About 15 percent of the projects were commercial in nature and some research results were also published in scientific journals.

== Other SADF front organisations ==
- Badger Arms
- Biocon (South Africa)
- Civil Cooperation Bureau
- Delta G Scientific Company
- Electronic Magnetic Logistical Component
- Geo International Trading
- Infladel
- Jeugkrag
- Lema (company)
- Military Technical Services
- Protechnik
- Veterans for Victory

== See also ==
- Project Coast
- South African Border War
- South Africa and weapons of mass destruction
- Rhodesia and weapons of mass destruction
- Medical experimentation in Africa
- SAIMR
- Selous Scouts
