= Magnolia Dell Park =

Park in Pretoria, South Africa

Coordinates: 25°45′44″S 28°13′13″E

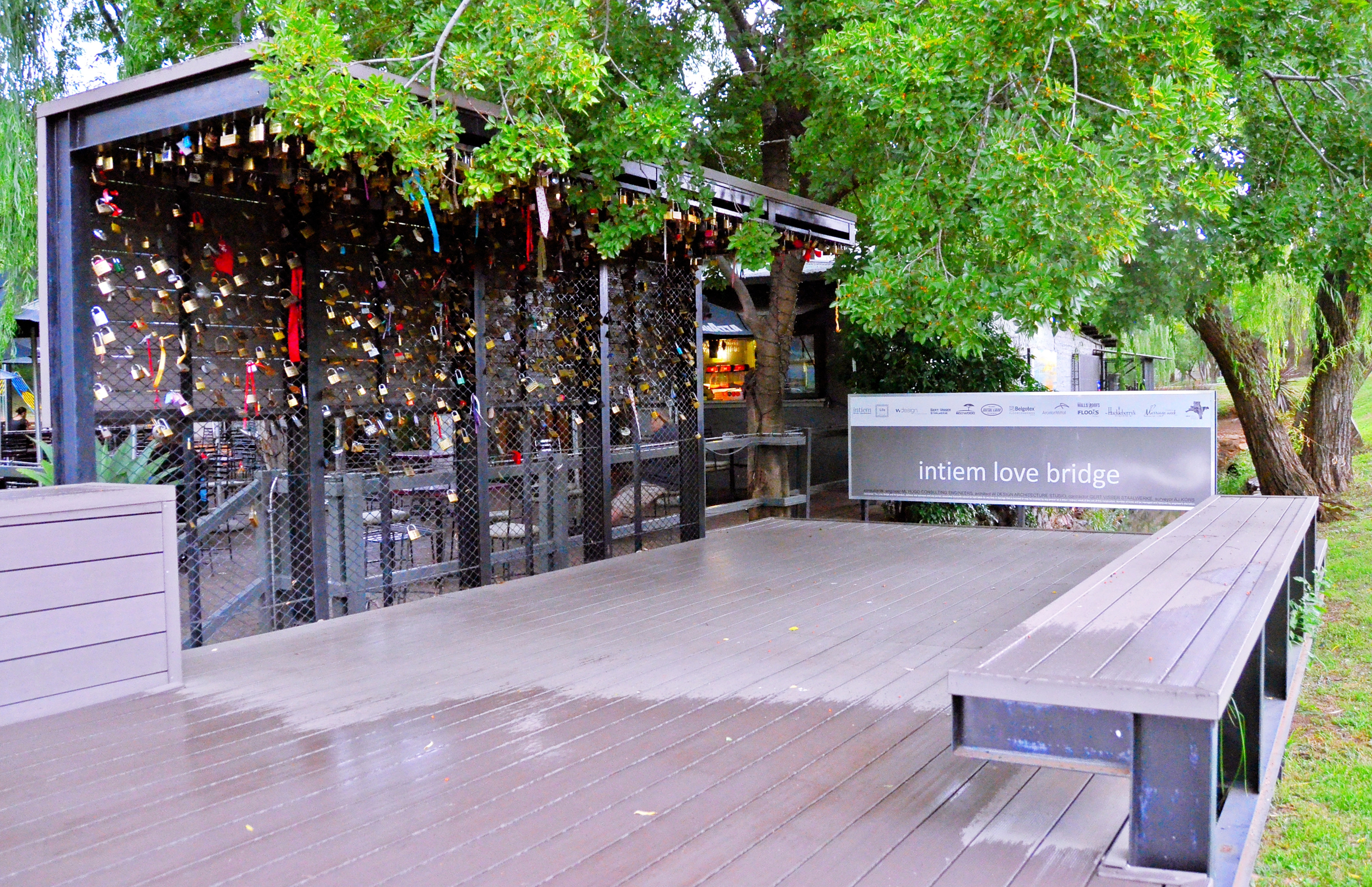
Love padlocks at Magnolia Dell's intiem love bridge

Magnolia Dell Park is a park in Bailey's Muckleneuk, Pretoria, South Africa. The park lies in the sharp-angled crook between Queen Wilhelmina Avenue and Justice Mahomed Street, otherwise surrounded by the Walkerspruit. The park is surrounded by high trees, and the aforementioned creek has a dam featuring a statue of Peter Pan in the middle. The Magnolia Flea Market is held on the first Sunday of each month there, and other events there include the Kuns in die Park and the Moonlight Market. The annual magnolia flowers in the park and further down Queen Wilhelmina Avenue are another key attraction. The park has a popular restaurant known as Huckleberry's.

On January 29, 1997, apartheid-era chemical and biological warfare expert Wouter Basson was arrested in the park.

The Gautrain goes past Magnolia Dell Park on the main line along University Road as well as a new realigned line.
