= Cold Case Hammarskjöld =

2019 documentary film by Mads Brügger

- Film poster
- Directed by: Mads Brügger
- Written by: Mads Brügger
- Produced by: Nadja Nørgaard Kristensen
- Starring: Mads Brügger; Göran Björkdahl; Dag Hammarskjöld
- Cinematography: Tore Vollan
- Edited by: Nicolás Nørgaard Staffolani
- Music by: John Erik Kaada
- Distributed by: Magnolia Pictures (USA)
- Release dates: 26 January 2019 (Sundance); 16 August 2019 (USA)
- Running time: 128 minutes
- Countries: Denmark; Norway; Sweden; Belgium
- Box office: $104,965

Cold Case Hammarskjöld is a 2019 documentary film by Danish film maker Mads Brügger. It depicts the mysterious death of UN secretary-general Dag Hammarskjöld in the 1961 Ndola United Nations DC-6 crash and also proposes a theory that a South African white supremacist organization is linked to the death, and that this organization has also attempted to spread HIV/AIDS among black Africans. The film investigates the possibility that Hammarskjöld's plane, which crashed in Northern Rhodesia, was shot down by Belgian-British mercenary pilot Jan van Risseghem. After unsuccessful attempts to conclusively prove that theory, the film veers off to investigate the mysterious mercenary organization South African Institute for Maritime Research (SAIMR), managing to contact two new witnesses that claim to have been involved with the organization. Parts of the movie are meta-cinematic, reflecting upon theatrical methods used (role playing, dressing up and employment of two African secretaries) and the true motivations of the filmmaker.

== Synopsis ==
Mads Brügger teams up with Göran Björkdahl, who received from his father a metal plate believed to be a part from the Albertina, Hammarskjöld's Douglas DC-6B aircraft. They develop and investigate the theory that a Fouga CM.170 Magister opened fire on the Albertina near Ndola and brought it down, possibly after an attempt to detonate a bomb after take-off had failed in Lubumbashi. Their revelations trigger a new investigation into Hammarskjöld's death; as a part of this new investigation Björkdahl's metal plate is examined and determined to not be authentic. Near Ndola Airport, Brügger and Björkdahl locate what they believe to be the burial site of the wreckage of the Albertina, and they make a comical attempt at excavating it, but are soon stopped by local authorities.

The film moves to South Africa, where in 1998 the Truth and Reconciliation Commission revealed a document with an outline for the assassination of Hammarskjöld. Brügger and Björkdahl want to trace the SAIMR, the organization behind this document, through its believed leader, Keith Maxwell. Maxwell is rumored to have operated a number of medical clinics in the townships of South Africa, even though he was not a medical doctor. The investigators believe SAIMR to have been a mercenary organization operating by order of MI6 and the CIA, and involved in the Hammarskjöld assassination, but they cannot prove this, despite recovering the first part of Maxwell's fictionalized autobiography. They also cannot explain the medical clinics, apart from Maxwell's strong interest in AIDS.

The final part of the film brings forward two new witnesses, claimed to be former SAIMR members or close relatives. These witnesses allege that SAIMR existed, and was a major clandestine mercenary organization. They claim SAIMR served the interests of white supremacy in Africa, and that it ran operations to administer the HIV virus to black people in South Africa, Mozambique, and other countries through the fake clinics, with the goal of depleting the black population to a point where whites were in the majority. Brügger and Björkdahl recover the second part of the autobiography of Maxwell, which alleges the involvement of SAIMR in the Hammarskjöld assassination. The first witness claims the playing card depicted in one of the photos of Hammarskjöld's corpse is a covert signal of CIA involvement.

== Release ==
The film was entered in the World Cinema Documentary Competition at the 2019 Sundance Film Festival where it won "Directing Award: World Cinema Documentary". It then opened in US movie theaters on 16 August 2019.

== Reception ==
South African Salim Abdool Karim claimed in an article published in The New York Times that spreading the HIV virus would not have been technically feasible at the time. The New York Times article also stated that the filmmakers' notes indicated that the man depicted as the whistleblower of the "virus spreading," Alex Jones, a former SAIMR militia member, was not aware of it until asked by the filmmakers, and that his testimony evolved over the course of their correspondence. However, Jones corroborates the statements made by the brother of murdered biologist Dagmar Feil, who also worked for SAIMR, and was about to reveal the truth of SAIMR's vaccinations via their network of clinics in South Africa and surrounding countries.

In July 2019, Cold Case Hammarskjöld was nominated for a European Parliament Lux Prize, the third time in the Prize's history that a documentary is among the three finalists.

== See also ==
- Operation Infektion
- Project Coast
