= Protechnik =

Protechnik was a front company established on 24 June 1987 by the South African Defence Force to perform quality assurance testing of chemical protective materials and equipment within a covert operation known as Project Coast.

Founded by Dr. Jan Lourens, a bio-engineering consultant at Roodeplaat Research Laboratories, as Systems Research and Development (SRD), with funding provided by the Medical arm of the SADF. Protechnik's shareholders would include Medchem Consolidated Investments (MCI), WPW Investments (a firm belonging to Wouter Basson) the Luxembourg-based Charburn Enterprises. According to testimony provided in the Wouter Basson trial, Protechnik was involved in reverse engineering Chemical Agent Monitors.

The company is now a subsidiary of Armscor.

== Other SADF front organisations ==
- Badger Arms
- Biocon (South Africa)
- Civil Cooperation Bureau
- Delta G Scientific Company
- Electronic Magnetic Logistical Component
- Executive Outcomes
- Geo International Trading
- Infladel
- Jeugkrag
- Lema (company)
- Military Technical Services
- Roodeplaat Research Laboratories
- Veterans for Victory
