= Advena =

South African nuclear weapons production facility

Coordinates: 25°45′03″S 28°01′44″E

Advena Central Laboratories was a South African nuclear weapons production facility. After weapons development was transferred from the Pelindaba nuclear research centre to the state-owned Armaments Corporation of South Africa (Armscor) in 1979, the site was developed as the Kentron Circle facility. This facility, built in 1980 and located 20 km (12 mi) west of Pretoria, was subsequently renamed Advena.

== Nuclear family ==
At Pelindaba, Nuclear weapons of the gun-type design were developed. Armscor established a production line there in 1981 and produced at least one nuclear device of a 10-18 kilotons yield each year.

== Extended family ==
Advena Central Laboratories were constructed in the mid-1980s to extend South Africa's nuclear capabilities from gun-type weapons to inter-continental ballistic missile (ICBM) delivery platforms. Work to produce advanced warhead designs was also developed. Working with Israel at Advena, a 2000 km-range missile – based on the Jericho II ICBM – was designed and tested. The construction of Advena was completed at the same time as South Africa's nuclear program was terminated in the lead-up to Nelson Mandela's election in 1994.

== See also ==
- South Africa and weapons of mass destruction
- Vela incident
- History of South Africa in the apartheid era
