= Delta G Scientific Company =

Front company of South African Defence Force to research and produce chemical weapons

Delta G Scientific Company was originally a front company established April 1982 in Weldegraan, Pretoria by the South African Defence Force to research and produce chemical weapons within a covert operation known as Project Coast.

Medchem Consolidated Investments was registered in the Cayman Islands by a David Webster on behalf of Wouter Basson, who held 75% of Delta G shares.

Delta G was acquired in 1993 by Sentrachem, which has been a subsidiary of the Dow Chemical Company since 1997.

== Other SADF front organisations ==
- Badger Arms
- Biocon (South Africa)
- Civil Cooperation Bureau
- Electronic Magnetic Logistical Component
- Geo International Trading
- Infladel
- Jeugkrag
- Jeugweerbaarheid - Free translation from Afrikaans = (White Afrikaner Male) Youth (Military) Resistance
- Lema (company)
- Military Technical Services
- Protechnik
- Roodeplaat Research Laboratories
- Staats Veiligheids Raad - Free translation from Afrikaans - (Apartheid) State Security (Eternal Upholdment) Council
- Veterans for Victory
