= Project Coast =

South African chemical weapons program

Project Coast was a top-secret chemical and biological weapons (CBW) programme instituted by the apartheid-era government of South Africa in the 1980s. Project Coast was the successor to a limited postwar CBW programme, which mainly produced the lethal agents CX powder and mustard gas, as well as non-lethal tear gas for riot control purposes. The programme was headed by the cardiologist Wouter Basson, who was also the personal physician of South African Prime Minister P. W. Botha.

Project Coast contributed to the operationalisation of covert weapon programs which targeted opponents of the apartheid regime, this include at least the lethal killing of 200 members of Namibia's liberation movement SWAPO, members of the Mozambique RENAMO rebel movement and the attempted assassination of senior figures associated with the ANC including Pallo Jordan and Ronnie Kasrils. A notable survivor, Frank Chikane, survived an assassination attempt with supplied poison from Project Coast.

In the 1980s, racial fears facilitated the development of a large-scale anthrax production facility at Roodeplaat Research Laboratories (RRL). It has also been reported that further plans were prepared for a "black bomb", this entailed the use of bacteria or specific biological pathogens to target black populations and ensure the survival of the Apartheid era South Africa.

Other confirmed areas of exploratory research involved Project Coast have related to controlling the Black South African population through a number of avenues such as lowering fertility rates and contaminating water supplies. Further speculations have been made between the activities Project Coast and the timely emergence of HIV in the South African region, with a vial of HIV/AIDs found at the Roodeplaat facility, but this latter allegation has not been conclusively proven.

== History ==
From 1975 onwards, the South African Defence Force (SADF) was embroiled in conventional battles in Angola as a result of the South African Border War. The perception that its enemies had access to battlefield chemical and biological weapons (CBW) led South Africa to begin expanding its programme, initially as a defensive measure and by researching vaccines. As the years went on, research shifted to offensive uses. In 1981, Botha ordered the SADF to develop CBW technology for use against South Africa's enemies. In response, the head of the South African Medical Service division, which was responsible for defensive CBW capabilities, hired Wouter Basson, a cardiologist, to visit other countries and report back on their respective CBW capabilities. He returned with the recommendation that South Africa's programme be expanded. In 1983, Project Coast was formed, with Basson at its head. To hide the programme and its procurement of CBW-related substances, Project Coast formed four front companies: Delta G Scientific Company, Roodeplaat Research Laboratories (RRL), Protechnik and Infladel. Ben Raubenheimer was appointed as CEO.

Nelson Mandela was a planned target of Project Coast with the intention to poison him with toxic agents to damage his mental capacities whilst he was incarcerated during the Botha regime. According to later witnesses during the trial of Dr. Wouter Basson in 2002, the initial plan was to poison Mandela with thallium shortly before his release in 1990.

Project Coast created a progressively larger variety of lethal offensive CBW toxins and biotoxins, in addition to the defensive measures. Initially, they were intended for use by the military in combat as a last resort. To that end, they copied Soviet techniques and designed devices that looked like ordinary objects but could poison those targeted for assassination. Examples included umbrellas and walking sticks that fired pellets containing poison, syringes disguised as screwdrivers, and poisoned beer cans and envelopes. In the early 1990s, with the end of apartheid, South Africa's weapons of mass destruction programmes were stopped. Despite efforts to destroy equipment, stocks, and information from those programmes, some still remain, leading to fears that they may find their way into the possession of terrorist networks.

In May 2002, Daan Goosen, the former head of South Africa's biological weapons programmes, contacted the Federal Bureau of Investigation (FBI) and offered to exchange existing bacterial stocks from the programmes in return for US$5 million, together with immigration permits for him and 19 other associates and their family members. The offer was eventually refused, with the FBI claiming that the strains were obsolete and therefore no longer a threat.

== Unusual features ==
The South African chemical weapons programme investigated all the standard CBW agents such as irritant riot control agents, lethal nerve agents and anticholinergic deliriants, which have been researched by virtually all countries that have carried out CBW research. The South African programme differed from the CBW programmes of many countries in its focus on developing non-lethal agents to help suppress internal dissent. This led to the investigation of unusual non-lethal agents, including illicit recreational drugs such as phencyclidine, MDMA, methaqualone and cocaine, as well as medicinal drugs such as diazepam, midazolam, ketamine, suxamethonium and tubocurarine, as potential incapacitating agents.

According to the testimony given by Wouter Basson to the Truth and Reconciliation Commission, analogues of the compounds were prepared and studied. Both methaqualone and MDMA (along with the deliriant BZ) were manufactured in large quantities and successfully weaponised into a fine dust or aerosol form that could be released over a crowd as a potential riot control agent. It was later discovered that Basson was also selling large quantities of MDMA and methaqualone as tablets on the black market. The amount manufactured was far larger than what was sold, but the court accepted that at least some genuine weaponisation and testing of the agents had been done. However, a later report by the United Nations Institute for Disarmament Research found that no documents indicated that MDMA had been researched as a crowd control agent, and that it was "extremely unlikely" MDMA was ever intended for this use.

A black mamba and its extracted venom were also part of the research, as were E. coli O157:H7 bacteria genetically modified to express some of the toxins made by Clostridium perfringens bacteria. A list of purchases at RRL and other documents include references to such things as the snake, biological agents such as anthrax, brucellosis, cholera and salmonella among others, and chemicals including aluminium phosphide, thallium acetate, sodium azide, sodium cyanide, mercury oxycyanide, cantharides, colchicine, powerful anticoagulants such as brodifacoum, phenylsilatranes, strychnine, paraquat, "knockout drops", digoxin, acetylcholinesterase inhibitors such as aldicarb and paraoxon and other poisons.

Other plans referenced in the UN report included crowd control with pheromones, and discussion of the development of several novel compounds, including a locally produced variant of BZ, novel derivatives of CR gas including "a compound which had a pyridine moiety in place of one of the benzene rings...[and] caused severe blisters on the skin", a new, more potent analogue of methaqualone and a "dimethylketone-amphetamine" derivative of MDMA. Another unusual project attempted to develop a method of sterilising crowds using a supposed male sterilant, pyridine. That was to be sprayed onto the crowds from a gas cylinder pressurised with nitrogen gas, since pyridine is highly flammable. A subsequent industrial accident caused the death of a gas company employee when the experimental contaminated medical oxygen cylinder had been returned to the gas supplier and filled with oxygen that exploded.

== Employment ==
In 1985, four SWAPO detainees held at Reconnaissance Regiment headquarters were allegedly given a sleeping drug in soft drinks, taken to Lanseria International Airport northwest of Johannesburg, and injected with three toxic substances supplied by Basson. Their bodies were thrown into the Atlantic Ocean.

The Civil Cooperation Bureau operative Petrus Jacobus Botes, who claimed to have directed bureau operations in Mozambique and Swaziland, asserted that in May 1989 he was ordered to contaminate the water supply at Dobra, a refugee camp in Namibia, with cholera and yellow fever organisms supplied by a SADF doctor. In late August 1989, he led an attempt to contaminate the water supply, but it failed because of the high chlorine content in the treated water at the camp.

== Component of genocide ==
Research on birth control methods to reduce the black birth rate was one such area. Goosen, the managing director of Roodeplaat Research Laboratories between 1983 and 1986, told Tom Mangold of the BBC that Project Coast had supported a project to develop a contraceptive that would have been applied clandestinely to blacks. Goosen reported that the project had developed a 'vaccine' for males and females, and that the researchers were still searching for a means by which it could be delivered to make black people sterile without them being made aware. Schalk van Rensburg stated that “fertility and fertility control studies comprised 18% of all projects”.

Testimony given at the Truth and Reconciliation Commission suggested that Project Coast researchers were also looking into putting birth control substances in water supplies. The project officer for Project Coast, Basson, was put on trial for 64 charges, all of which were committed while he held that position. Goosen testified that when asked what motivated him, Basson had replied that "although we do not have any doubt that black people will take over the country one day, when my daughter asks me what I did to prevent this, at least my conscience will be clean".

Despite strong links to Israel and Libya, no country has been directly implicated for involvement in the project, however, the project would not have been able to develop without some form of international support. According to Miles Jackson, while the focus on apartheid South Africa’s research into fertility is barely part of the ongoing discussion regarding Project Coast, what occurred could constitute conspiracy to commit genocide under international law.

== See also ==
- Medical experimentation in Africa
- South Africa and weapons of mass destruction
- South African Institute for Maritime Research
