= Joice Heth =

American slave turned sideshow performer

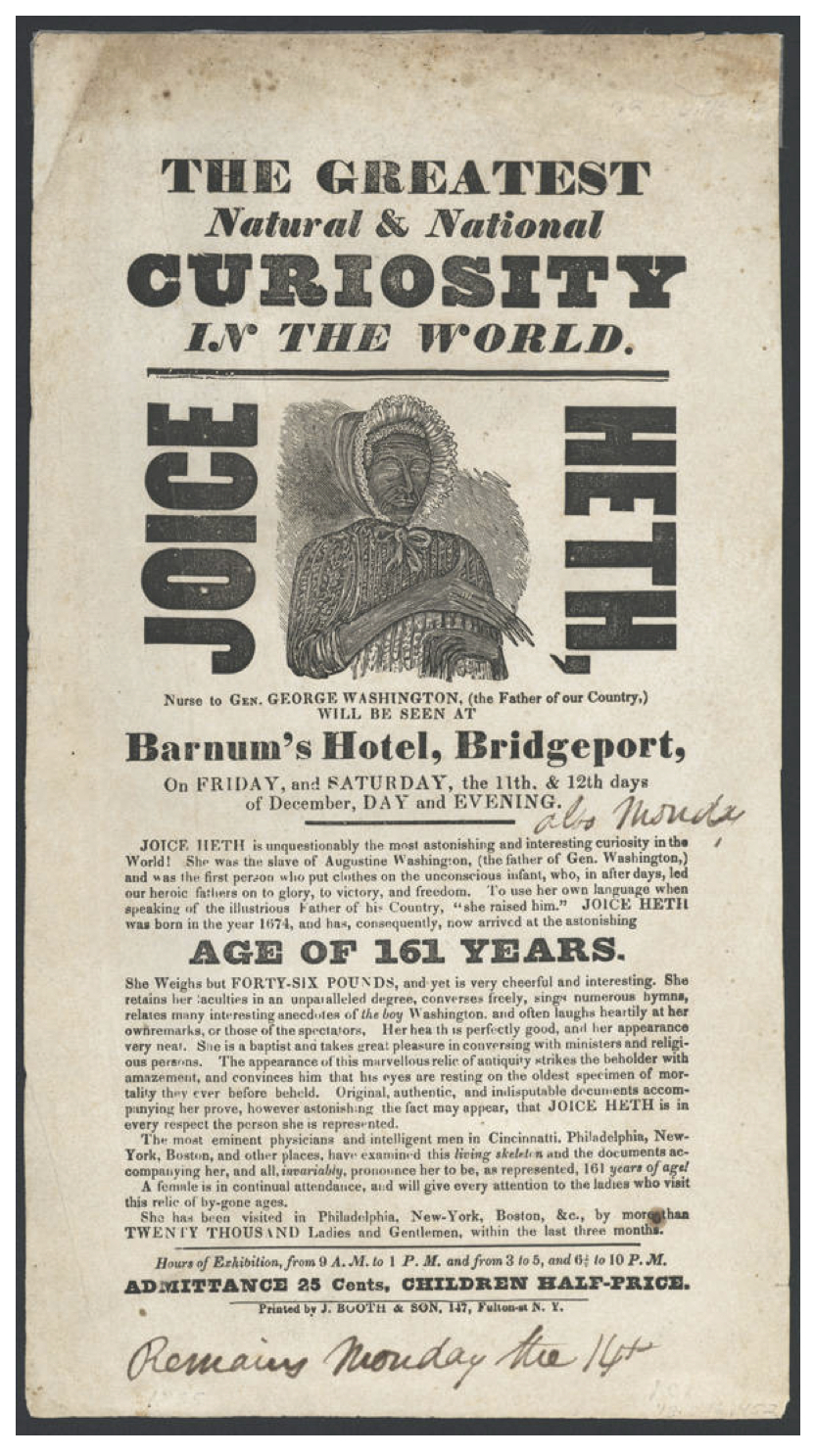
- Poster advertising Heth, 1835
- Born: c. 1756; Madagascar (Note: Barnum's promotional pamphlet claimed Heth was born in Madagascar, but her birthplace is unknown.)
- Died: February 19, 1836 (aged 79–80); New York City, New York, U.S.
- Occupation: Exhibition performer
- Known for: Exhibition by P. T. Barnum under the false claim that she was the 161-year-old former wet nurse of George Washington

Joice Heth (c. 1756 – February 19, 1836) was an enslaved African-American woman who was exhibited in the United States during the final months of her life. In 1835, showman P. T. Barnum promoted her with the false claim that she was the 161-year-old former wet nurse of George Washington, helping to launch his career while making Heth one of the most widely publicized performers of the era. Elderly, blind, and largely paralyzed, she appeared before audiences telling stories about Washington and singing hymns.

Following Heth's death in 1836, her body remained a public attraction. A widely attended public autopsy concluded that she was about 80 years old, disproving Barnum's claims about her age, but Barnum continued the publicity by falsely asserting that the wrong body had been examined. Historians have described Heth's exhibition, and the display of her body after death, as an early example of the commercialization of race, spectacle, and pseudoscience in American popular entertainment.

== Early life ==
Little is known of Heth's early years. In 1835, she was enslaved by John S. Bowling and exhibited in Louisville, Kentucky. In June 1835, she was sold to promoters R.W. Lindsay and Coley Bartram.

== Enslavement ==
Towards the end of her life, she was blind and mostly paralyzed, but could still talk, and had some ability to move her right arm. Barnum started to exhibit her on August 10, 1835, at Niblo's Garden in New York City. For those who were skeptical of the claims about Heth's longevity, her body aided in the belief of her exaggerated age. Harriet A. Washington writes that, at the time of her display, Heth had a very small frame, deep wrinkles, was toothless, and had fingernails that resembled talons. Washington claims that Heth's toothless mouth was the result of Barnum forcefully extracting her teeth so that she would look older. As a 7-month traveling exhibit for Barnum, Heth told stories about "little George" and sang a hymn.

Historian Eric Lott claimed Heth earned the impresario $1,500 a week, a princely sum in that era (equivalent to $47,000 in 2025). Barnum's career as a showman took off.

== Promotion and public image ==
After acquiring Heth in June 1835, P. T. Barnum expanded a promotional narrative already introduced by R. W. Lindsay, who had exhibited her as the childhood nurse of George Washington. Barnum's advertisements claimed that Heth had been born in 1674, was 161 years old, and had "raised" the future president from infancy. One broadside proclaimed Heth "the most astonishing and interesting curiosity in the World", identifying her as the former slave of Augustine Washington and declaring that she was "the first person who put clothes on the unconscious infant" who later became the nation's first president.

Barnum also promoted the exhibit through printed literature. A twelve-page pamphlet, The Life of Joice Heth, expanded the fabricated biography presented in his advertisements, claiming that Heth had been born in Madagascar, enslaved as a teenager, and later entered the Washington household. The pamphlet, believed to have been written by Barnum's assistant Levi Lyman, was sold to visitors as part of the exhibition.

During her performances, Heth recounted stories about the young George Washington, sang hymns, answered questions from visitors, and allowed audiences to examine her closely, reinforcing the impression that she was an authentic witness to the nation's founding. When skepticism about her age grew during 1835, Barnum reportedly circulated anonymous letters to New York newspapers claiming that Heth was not a living woman at all, but an elaborate automaton constructed from whalebone, springs, and india rubber. The contradictory rumors generated further publicity by encouraging audiences to see the exhibition and judge the claims for themselves.

== Exhibition after death ==
Following Heth's death on February 19, 1836, her body remained the focus of public exhibition. Six days later, on February 25, 1836, a public autopsy was held at New York's City Saloon to determine her true age. Approximately 1,500 paying spectators attended the examination, with admission set at US$0.50 (equivalent to $14.66 in 2025) per person.

The autopsy was performed by New York surgeon Dr. David L. Rogers, who concluded that Heth was about 80 years old, disproving claims that she had lived to the age of 161. Although the examination publicly challenged the central claim used to promote her exhibition, Barnum immediately asserted that Rogers had dissected the wrong body and insisted that Heth was still alive and touring Europe. He later acknowledged that this assertion had itself been a publicity stunt.

Historian Benjamin Reiss argues that Heth's exhibition continued after her death, with the public autopsy serving as its final stage. In his view, the medical examination of Heth's body became another theatrical performance, extending her commercial exploitation beyond death while blurring the boundaries between entertainment, scientific inquiry, and public spectacle.

== See also ==
- Human zoo
- Sarah Baartman
- John Smith and Charlie Smith, subjects of other longevity hoaxes
