= Medical experimentation in Africa =

- Date: 20th - 21st century
- Location: Africa
- Cause: Medical Research and Clinical Trials

African countries have been sites for clinical trials by large pharmaceutical companies, raising human rights concerns. Incidents of unethical experimentation, clinical trials lacking properly informed consent, and forced medical procedures have been claimed and prosecuted.

== Specific incidents by date ==
=== Meningitis testing in Nigeria: 1990s ===
The American corporation Pfizer used the drug Trovan in a clinical trial in Kano, Nigeria. The trial compared the new antibiotic (Trovan) against the best treatment available at the time (intravenous ceftriaxone). Eleven children died in the trial: five after taking Trovan and six after taking an older antibiotic used for comparison in the clinical trial. Others suffered blindness, deafness and brain damage, the cause of which is difficult to determine because these disabilities are relatively common outcomes of the disease itself. A panel of medical experts later implicated Pfizer in the incident, concluding the drug had been administered as part of an illegal clinical trial without authorization from the Nigerian government or consent from the children's parents. This led to a lawsuit from the Nigerian government over informed consent. Pfizer countered that it met all the necessary regulations. The drug was approved for general use in the US but eventually withdrawn due to hepatotoxicity.

=== HIV/AIDS testing in Zimbabwe: 1990s ===
AZT trials conducted on HIV-positive African subjects by U.S. physicians and the University of Zimbabwe were performed without proper informed consent. The United States began testing AZT treatments in Africa in 1994, through projects funded by the Centers for Disease Control (CDC), the World Health Organization (WHO) and the National Institutes of Health (NIH). It included testing of over 17,000 women for a medication that prevents mother-to-child transmission of HIV/AIDS. The subjects did not fully understand the testing methods, the effectiveness, the possible dangers, or the nature of a placebo in testing situations. They were also told about the trials under duress. Half of these women received a placebo that has no effect, making transmission likely. As a result, an estimated 1000 babies contracted HIV/AIDS although a proven life-saving regimen already existed. The CDC ended the short course testing in 1998 after they announced they had enough information from Thailand trials.

=== Forced sexual reassignment in South Africa: 1970s–1980s ===
In a project headed by Aubrey Levin during the 1970s to 1980s, the South African Defence Force forced lesbian and gay military personnel to undergo "sex-change" operations. This was part of a secret program to purge homosexuality in the army. It included psychological coercion, chemical castration, electric shock, and other unethical medical experiments. An estimated 900 forced sexual reassignment operations may have been performed between 1971 and 1989 at military hospitals. Most of the victims were males, young 16 to 24-year-old white men who were drafted into the army during the South African Border War. Women were also subject to the experimentation.

=== Forced contraception in Rhodesia (now Zimbabwe): 1970s ===
Depo-Provera was clinically tested on black Rhodesian (now Zimbabwean) women in the 1970s. Once approved, the drug was used as a birth control measure. Women on white-run commercial farms were coerced into accepting Depo-Provera. In 1981, the drug was banned in what was by then Zimbabwe.

=== Sterilisation experiments in German South-West Africa (now part of Namibia): Late 1800s–1910s ===
Eugen Fischer conducted sterilisation experiments on Herero women in German South-West Africa (now Namibia, less Walvis Bay etc.) in the early 1900s. His experimentation was largely done on mixed-race children in order to provide justification to ban mixed-race marriages. He joined the Nazi party thereafter where he did similar experiments in the Jewish concentration camps. Late stage studies were later continued by Doctor Hans Harmsen, founder of the German branch of International Planned Parenthood Federation (IPPF) who is also associated with the compulsory sterilisation in Nazi Germany.

== Effects on legitimate medicine ==
Author Harriet A. Washington argues that unethical medical experimentation that has occurred for over a century may be the cause of the documented fear and mistrust of doctors and medicine in Africa. For example, polio has been on the rise in Nigeria, Chad, and Burkina Faso because many people there avoid vaccinations because they believe that the vaccines are contaminated with HIV or sterilization agents, she argues. Due to the meningitis testing incident in Kano, many Nigerians now refuse to participate in clinical trials.

== The role of poverty ==
Many African nations cannot afford to offer medicine for their citizens without subsidies from multinational pharmaceutical corporations. To court these pharmaceutical corporations, some African nations minimize legal regulations on the conduct of medical research, which prevents potential legal battles from arising. Author Harriet A. Washington has argued that this forces some Africans to make a Hobson's choice: "experimental medicine or no medicine at all". People living in the rural or slum area are also more vulnerable to experimentation because they are more likely to be illiterate and to misunderstand the effects of the experimentation.

== Codes of ethics ==
Several national and international bodies have devised codes of ethics for conducting experiments and clinical trials. These include the Nuremberg Code and Helsinki Declaration and the Protocol to the African Charter on Human and Peoples' Rights on the Rights of Women in Africa, which seeks to prohibit all medical and scientific experiments on women without their prior informed consent.

== Popular culture references ==
The book and movie The Constant Gardener highlighted the dynamics of conduct in clinical trials in Africa in the slum areas. This was based on the real-life meningitis incident in Kano, Nigeria. New York Times best seller book Medical Apartheid by Harriet A. Washington, provides a historical account of experimentation on African Americans, but also includes the links to African experimentation.

== See also ==
- Human experimentation in North Korea
- Japanese human experimentation
- Nazi human experimentation
- Unethical human experimentation in the United States
- Project Coast
