= Lema (company) =

South African company

Lema was a "blue plan" front-company of the Civil Cooperation Bureau established in Johannesburg, South Africa with offices in Parktown by ex-policeman Leon André Maree. The company's name was derived from the first two letters of its founder's name and surname. It exported electronic appliances, computers, pocket calculators, and watches from South Africa to other African countries.

Lema was funded with at least R 40,000 by the South African Defence Force.

== Other SADF front organizations ==
- Civil Cooperation Bureau
- Delta G Scientific Company
- Executive Outcomes
- Jeugkrag
- Roodeplaat Research Laboratories
- Veterans for Victory

== See also ==
- Politics of South Africa
