= Anton Lubowski =

Namibian politician

- Born: Anton Theodor Eberhard August Lubowski; 3 February 1952; Lüderitz, South West Africa (now Namibia)
- Died: 12 September 1989 (aged 37); Windhoek, Namibia
- Occupations: Lawyer, Activist
- Known for: SWAPO activist
- Spouse: Gabrielle (Gaby) Lubowski
- Children: 2
- Website: https://www.alet.org.za/

Anton Theodor Eberhard August Lubowski (3 February 1952 – 12 September 1989) was a Namibian anti-apartheid activist and advocate. He was a member of the South West Africa People's Organization (SWAPO). In 1989 he was assassinated by operatives of South Africa's Civil Cooperation Bureau. In 2015 he was declared a National Hero and his body reburied at the National Heroes' Acre outside Windhoek.

== Education and early life ==
Lubowski was born in Lüderitz, South West Africa, to a German father and an Afrikaner mother. In 1960 the family moved to their farm in Aus. From 1965 Lubowski attended Paul Roos Gymnasium in Stellenbosch, South Africa. He then did a year of military training with the South African Defence Force in Pretoria, before attending Stellenbosch University for a B.A., and the University of Cape Town for an LLB.

He married Gabriele Schuster in 1976, the couple had two children. In 1978 they moved to Windhoek where Lubowski took up work as a lawyer.

== Political career ==
As an advocate he was a member of the Windhoek Bar. He defended political prisoners and got involved with the Namibian trade union movement in the capacity of secretary of finance and administration of the National Union of Namibian Workers (NUNW). He joined SWAPO officially in 1984. Before 1989, he had no official party position but he made frequent public statements on behalf of SWAPO. He initiated the NAMLAW Project, a legal research organisation to draft legislation for Namibia after independence. He received the Austrian Bruno Kreisky Prize for Services to Human Rights. As a SWAPO activist he was detained six times by the South African authorities. In 1989 he became deputy secretary for finance and administration in the SWAPO election directorate. Shortly before his death he became a member of the SWAPO central committee.

== Assassination and remembrance ==
In the evening of 12 September 1989, Lubowski was shot by a group of assailants in front of his house in Sanderburg Street in central Windhoek. He was hit by several shots from an AK-47 automatic rifle and died from a bullet wound to his head. Operatives of South Africa's Civil Cooperation Bureau were implicated in the attack. An inquest found prima facie evidence that the murder was orchestrated by the bureau, and carried out by Irish national Donald Acheson.

On 26 August 2015, Namibia's Heroes' Day, Lubowski was reburied at Namibia's National Heroes' Acre.

Lubowski's life is described in his widow's self-published novel On Solid Ground. Lubowski's assassination is part of the backstory in Bernhard Jaumann's novel The Hour of the Jackal. Lubowski's daughter Nadja runs the Anton Lubowski Educational Trust, a charity organisation in his memory. Stellenbosch University hosts an annual memorial lecture in his name.
