= Harriet A. Washington =

American journalist and historian

Harriet Washington
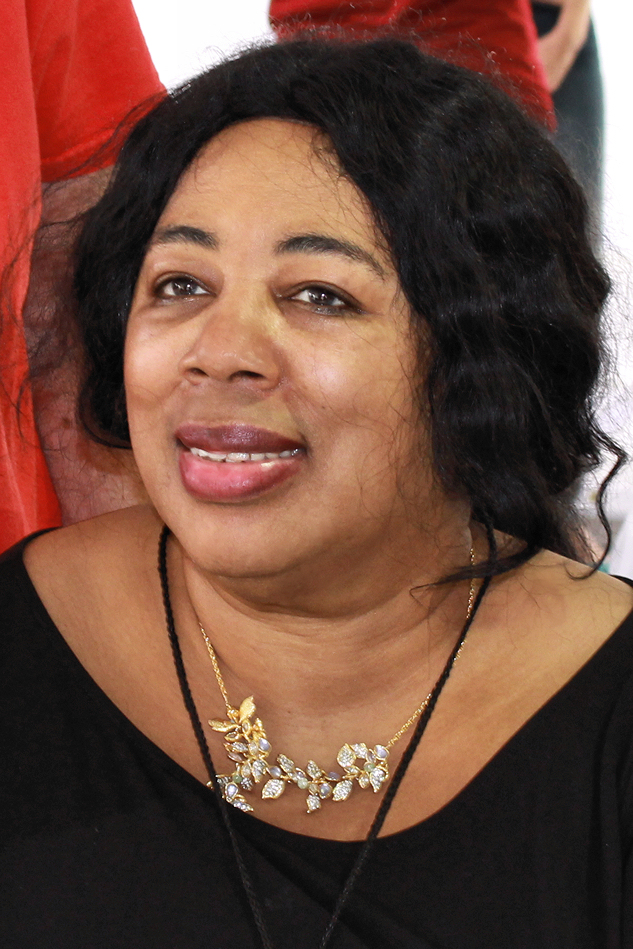
- Washington at the 2015 Texas Book Festival
- Born: October 5, 1951 (age 75); Fort Dix, New Jersey, U.S.
- Education: University of Rochester (B.A.); Columbia University (M.A.)
- Occupation: Author
- Spouse: Ron DeBose (m. 1992; died 2013)
- Writing career
- Notable work: Medical Apartheid

Harriet A. Washington is an American writer and medical ethicist. She is the author of the book Medical Apartheid, which won the 2007 National Book Critics Circle Award for Nonfiction. She has also written books on environmental racism and the erosion of informed consent in medicine.

Washington has been a fellow in ethics at the Harvard Medical School, a fellow at the Harvard School of Public Health, and a senior research scholar at the National Center for Bioethics at Tuskegee University.

== Education ==
Washington was born in Fort Dix, New Jersey. She graduated from the University of Rochester in 1976 with a B.A. in English literature and later completed an M.A. in journalism at the Columbia University Graduate School of Journalism.

== Career ==
Washington was Health and Science editor of the Rochester Democrat and Chronicle. In 1990, she was awarded the New Horizons Traveling Fellowship by the Council for the Advancement of Science Writing. She subsequently worked as a Page One editor at USA Today, before winning a fellowship from the Harvard School of Public Health. In 1997, she won a John S. Knight Fellowship at Stanford University, and in 2002 was named a research fellow in medical ethics at Harvard Medical School.

Washington's third book, Medical Apartheid, won the 2007 National Book Critics Circle Award for Nonfiction. The book has been described as "the first and only comprehensive history of medical experimentation on African Americans".

Her 2019 book A Terrible Thing to Waste: Environmental Racism and Its Assault on the American Mind explores how poor people of color disproportionately suffer from environmental disasters and exposure to environmental toxins, including lead, arsenic, mercury, and DDT. Exposure to these chemicals impairs brain development and can lead to lower IQ.

Washington was a visiting scholar at the DePaul University College of Law and was a Shearing Fellow at the Black Mountain Institute of the University of Las Vegas at Nevada in 2012-2013.

Washington has been interviewed by NPR and Democracy Now!.

== Personal life ==
Washington lives in Manhattan. She was married to Ron DeBose from 1992 until his death in 2013.

== Selected bibliography ==
- Living Healthy with Hepatitis C: Natural and Conventional Approaches to Recover your Quality of Life. New York: Dell. 2000. ISBN 978-0-440-23608-5.
- Washington, Harriet A. (July 2002). "Burning Love: Big Tobacco Takes Aim at LGBT Youths". American Journal of Public Health. 92 (7): 1086–1095. doi:10.2105/ajph.92.7.1086. PMC 3222279. PMID 12084686.
- Medical Apartheid: The Dark History of Medical Experimentation on Black Americans from Colonial Times to the Present. New York: Doubleday. 2006. ISBN 978-0-385-50993-0.
- Deadly Monopolies: The Shocking Corporate Takeover of Life Itself--And the Consequences for Your Health and Our Medical Future. New York: Random House. 2011. ISBN 978-0-385-52892-4.
- Infectious Madness: The Surprising Science of How we "Catch" Mental Illness. New York: Little, Brown and Company. 2015. ISBN 978-0-316-27780-8.
- A Terrible Thing to Waste: Environmental Racism and its Assault on the American Mind. Little, Brown Spark. 2019. ISBN 978-0-316-50943-5.
- Carte Blanche: The Erosion of Medical Consent. New York: Columbia Global Reports. 2021. ISBN 978-17-344-20722.

== Selected reviews ==
Harriet reviews mostly on those subjects that she writes upon - human experimentation, especially deceptive ones, without taking informed consent. Her review of one of the most talked about books on this subject, The Plutonium Files, was published in The New England Journal of Medicine.

- Washington HA (1999). "Book Review of "The Plutonium Files: America's Secret Medical Experiments in the Cold War" By Eileen Welsome. 580 pp. New York, Dial Press, 1999. $26.95. ISBN 0-385-31402-7". N Engl J Med. 341 (25): 1941–1942. doi:10.1056/NEJM199912163412519.
