= Wouter Basson =

South African cardiologist and chemical and biological weapons researcher (born 1950)

- Born: 6 July 1950

Wouter Basson (Afrikaans pronunciation: [ˈʋʌutər 'basɔn] WOW-tər BAH-son; born 6 July 1950) is a South African cardiologist, drug trafficker, and former head of the country's secret chemical and biological warfare project, Project Coast, during the apartheid era. Nicknamed "Dr Death" by the press for his alleged actions in apartheid South Africa, Basson was acquitted in 2002 of 67 charges, after having been suspended from his military post with full pay in 1999.

Among other charges, Basson was alleged to have supplied a "lethal triple cocktail" of powerful muscle relaxants which were used during Operation Duel whose objective was the systematic elimination of SWAPO prisoners of war and SADF members who posed a threat to South African covert operations. The United Nations report "Project Coast: Apartheid's Chemical and Biological Warfare Programme." identifies the triple cocktail as ketamine, succinylcholine, and tubocurarine. Basson was accused of murder, including the killings of hundreds of soldiers from SWAPO who were drugged and then pushed out of an aircraft over the sea, of supplying the poison used to kill anti-apartheid activists, as well as drug dealing charges, fraud, and theft.

A 2013 Guardian article reported that he was working as a cardiologist at the Durbanville Mediclinic in Cape Town. In 2021, reports that he was working at a Western Cape Mediclinic facility generated some criticism of the company on social media.

== Project Coast ==
Much of what Basson was working on is still secret. It is known that in 1981, when he was working as a personal physician to state president P. W. Botha, the country's Surgeon-General hired Basson to work for and form 7 Medical Battalion Group, a specialist unit of the South African Military Health Service. His job was to collect information about other countries' chemical and biological warfare capabilities under the name Project Coast. After his preliminary report, Basson became the head project officer and began to work on the country's chemical and biological weapons capability. He recruited about 200 researchers from around the world and received annual funds equivalent to $10 million. In 1982, Basson is alleged to have arranged the killing of 200 SWAPO prisoners in Operation Duel.

Project Coast secretly researched chemical and biological warfare in violation of the international BTWC agreement. Basson created four front companies; Delta G Scientific Company; Roodeplaat Research Laboratories (RRL), Protechnik and Infadel, which in 1989 was split into two companies: D. John Truter Financial Consultants and Sefmed Information Services. The companies were used to officially distance the military from the project, to procure necessary chemicals and channel funds for the research. According to later investigation, Basson had a free rein to do what he wanted. Delta G did most of the research, production and development of the chemical agents, while RRL developed chemical and biological pathogens and allegedly was involved with genetic engineering. Protechnik was a large nuclear, biological and chemical warfare plant developing defences against chemical weapons. Infadel dealt with those on a smaller scale and concentrated on financing and administration of other units and possibly channelling funds between military and research facilities. Many of the employees were not aware of what they were involved with.

In the 1980s Basson and the project were allegedly involved with attacks and assassinations against members of anti-apartheid movements. Leaders in South Africa, Angola and Namibia also claimed that the more dangerous chemicals were used for crowd control in the country, although the government claimed otherwise and claimed that chemical weapons were used against South African troops. Basson provided the Civil Cooperation Bureau (CCB) with lethal chemicals to be used against prominent anti-apartheid activists. Basson continued to travel all over the world to gather information about chemical and biological warfare programs and set up other shell and paper companies as additional front companies, possibly for money laundering.

When F. W. de Klerk became president in 1990, he ordered that production of the chemicals be stopped and the lethal agents destroyed. Basson concentrated on non-lethal chemical agents and chemicals the government had not banned. That included a large amount of ecstasy and Mandrax that were apparently exported or allegedly sold to drug dealers in communities active in the anti-apartheid movement (cf. Basson brownies). Most of the stockpile disappeared afterwards. Scientists working on the project later stated that they believed it was to be used to create drug-laced tear gas. In January 1992, FRELIMO troops conducted an operation near the South African border. During the course of the operation, they were allegedly exposed to what was thought to have been a chemical agent. Some of the soldiers died during the incident and others required hospitalisation. Investigation by the United Nations, United States and the United Kingdom identified it as BZ. American and British officials began to pressure the South African government, and in January 1993 Project Coast was wound down. Basson was officially retired and hired to dismantle the project, and allegedly profited when some of the South African front companies were privatised. Later government investigation found that there were large amounts of chemicals and agents missing.

== TRC investigation ==
In 1993 the Office of Serious Economic Offences (OSEO) began to investigate Basson's business dealings in an unheard of seven-year forensic audit. In 1995 the South African government hired Basson to work for Transnet, a transportation and infrastructure company and possibly for other more secretive jobs. The US and UK governments suspected that during his visits to Libya between 1993 and 1995, Basson might have sold chemical and biological weapons secrets. In 1995, the government of Nelson Mandela rehired Basson as an army surgeon, allegedly due to US and UK pressure and possibly because the government wanted to keep an eye on him.

In 1996, South Africa's Truth and Reconciliation Commission (TRC) began to investigate the SADF and determined that the army had probably used lethal toxins against ANC activists. Basson was connected to many of these attacks. In 1997, the CIA told the South African government that Basson intended to leave the country. When Basson was arrested in a sting operation in Pretoria in 1997, he had 1000 ecstasy tablets with him. At the time, he had hundreds of secret Project Coast documents in his car. TRC began to investigate Project Coast which led them to suspect that Basson had sold his secrets to governments of countries like Libya and Iraq. In 1997 they asked for the help of the Netherlands Institute for Southern Africa (NIZA) whose investigation report was included in the Truth Commission Files.

At the same time, the Office for Serious Economic Offences, the National Intelligence Agency (NIA), and the Gauteng Attorney-General's Special Investigation Team investigated Basson's affairs. Conflict of interest slowed down the Commission investigation but the TRC gained more information from OSEO. Basson appeared before the TRC on 31 July 1998 and gave evidence for 12 hours. While his lawyers constantly interrupted the questioning with legal technicalities, the Commission determined that Basson had been the primary decision maker in Project Coast and should be put on trial.

== Trial ==
Basson's trial began on 4 October 1999 in Pretoria. At the time, the South African media had dubbed him "Dr Death". Basson faced 67 charges, including drug possession, drug trafficking, fraud and embezzlement of a total of R36 million, 229 murders and conspiracy to murder and theft. Basson refused to seek amnesty from the Truth Commission. The prosecution presented 153 witnesses, but the case soon began to turn against them. On 11 October 1999 Judge Willie Hartzenberg dismissed six important charges, including four charges of murder and possible involvement in 200 deaths in Namibia, because he stated that the South African court could not prosecute crimes committed in other countries. Basson was also included in the Namibian amnesty of 1989. Hartzenberg then adjourned the trial for two weeks. After 18 months of trial, Hartzenberg reduced the number of charges to 46.

Basson called only one witness: himself. In July 2001 Basson began to present his own evidence, speaking for 40 days. He stated that he had learned about weapons of mass destruction from Saddam Hussein, that he had indeed had free rein in the project and that he had exchanged information with foreign governments. Technically, all that was legal. The defence argued that Basson should have immunity for anything that had happened in Namibia. On 22 April 2002 Judge Hartzenberg dismissed all the remaining charges against Basson and acquitted him. In his judgement, the judge called the state's case "fragmented and confusing", and that it was largely superficial, hoping to convince the court of Basson's guilt in a manner which fell far short of the standard "beyond reasonable doubt". Judge Hartzenberg further added that the state seemed to have decided what the truth was and had urged the court not to believe anything that contradicted the state's version of the truth. The trial had lasted 30 months. The state tried to appeal the judgement due to legal inaccuracies, but the Supreme Court of Appeal refused to order a retrial in 2003, a step reserved for appeals that had no chance of success.

After his release, Basson continued to travel all over the world as a guest speaker, and has founded his own private medical practice. In June 2005, a group of Swiss investigators questioned him about illegal trade in weapons and nuclear material and asked the South African government to stop cooperating with him.

Later that year the Constitutional Court, South Africa's highest court, overturned the judgement of the Supreme Court of Appeal. It ruled that crimes allegedly committed outside the country could be prosecuted in South Africa. Since then, the National Prosecuting Authority has not instituted proceedings against Basson, as the trial court had already rejected evidence relating to these charges.

== HPCSA ruling ==
In 2006, the Health Professions Council of South Africa (HPCSA) started its own process of investigating Basson's conduct. A charge sheet was drawn up and the inquiry began in November 2007. Out of the seven charges levelled against Basson, four full indictments remain after the HPCSA discharged two charges and part of a third charge against him.

On 10 May 2010, the application by Wouter Basson to the South African High Court was rejected. The application to the High Court attempted to have the charges set aside as unlawful, unreasonable and unfair. The judge found that there was no evidence to suggest that the council was in any way biased or prejudiced against the doctor.

On 18 December 2013, the HPCSA found Basson guilty of unprofessional conduct on four charges. On 4 June 2014 sentencing procedure was postponed due to unavailability of counsel.

On 27 March 2019, six years after Basson was found guilty of unethical conduct by an HPCSA committee, the Gauteng High Court ruled that there was bias on the part of the committee members that presided over the disciplinary hearing. The judge ruled that the proceedings (instituted by the HPCSA against Basson) were irregular and unfair and illustrated a total disregard for the rights of Basson. The hearing (and, therefore, the finding of unethical conduct by the committee) was accordingly set aside.
