= South African Institute for Maritime Research =

South African paramilitary organisation

South African Institute for Maritime Research (SAIMR or SAIMAR, pronounced /ˈsaɪmɑːr/) is the name of a paramilitary organisation that is believed to have performed clandestine operations to support white supremacy in Africa. It was led by Keith Maxwell, who died in 2006.

SAIMR first became publicly known during sessions of the South African Truth and Reconciliation Commission (TRC) in August 1998. A year before the second elections after the end of apartheid, documents emerged implying SAIMR had a role in a plot to kill Dag Hammarskjöld, the Secretary-General of the United Nations, in 1961.

Letters with SAIMR's official letterhead were found during the TRC hearings. The letters suggested that MI6 and the CIA had agreed that Hammarskjöld should be removed, a suggestion both organisations denied.

While conducting research on her 2011 book about the 1961 Ndola Transair Sweden DC-6 crash that killed Hammarskjöld, Susan Williams noticed that the original documents from the TRC have disappeared.

A report by the United Nations prepared in 2014 noted that the details provided in the SAIMR documents lent some credence to theories that Hammarskjöld may have been assassinated, but noted that neither the authenticity of the documents nor their contents could be verified.

The 2019 documentary film Cold Case Hammarskjöld by Mads Brügger brought renewed media attention to these claims. The documentary discloses testimony from an alleged ex-SAIMR operative that SAIMR deliberately spread HIV among black people in Africa.

The documentary also claims that the mother of a young woman named Dagmar Feil tried to bring the killing of her daughter to the attention of the TRC, implying that her daughter had worked with SAIMR to spread HIV among black people and had wanted to make that public.
