= Jeugkrag =

South African political youth group

Jeugkrag (meaning "Youth Power"), also known as Youth for South Africa, was a short-lived South African youth group in the late 1980s. It was surreptitiously funded by the apartheid government's Department of Military Intelligence in an operation known as Project Essay. Led by Marthinus van Schalkwyk (later a member of the African National Congress) it operated exclusively on Afrikaans university campuses and sought to influence the political views of Afrikaans-speaking students.

Van Schalkwyk was the national chairman. He was supported between 1987 and July 1988 by Cedric de Coning, who was both director of fund raising and publicity secretary.

Putatively aimed at bringing together youth from different ethnic and ideological backgrounds, Jeugkrag was a transparent effort to supplant the process of youth dialogue originally started by the Institute for Democracy in South Africa (IDASA), an NGO founded at the end of 1986 by the liberal ex-parliamentarians Frederik van Zyl Slabbert and Alex Boraine with funding from donors such as the Open Society Foundation and the Swiss Agency for Development and Cooperation (SDC). Slabbert and Boraine, who had decamped in frustration from the tricameral parliament, were part of the white group that held groundbreaking discussions with ANC delegates at the historic Dakar meeting in 1987.

The group was vilified by PW Botha, who called them "political terrorists". Peter Mokaba, an ANC leader that Jeugkrag had engaged, would later comment: "At the time although we knew that Jeugkrag was not an independent organization, but part of the heart and soul of the National Party, it was our policy to discuss matters with both progressive and reactionary organizations."

In 1990 en route to a meeting in Botswana, a 12-person Jeugkrag delegation was detained by police at the Monomotapa Hotel in Harare, Zimbabwe. They were questioned about a meeting that they had attended with members of the Zimbabwe Unity Movement (ZUM), a marginal political group opposed to Robert Mugabe's government. The delegation consisted exclusively of representatives from Afrikaans-language universities including the Rand Afrikaans University, Stellenbosch University, and the University of Pretoria.

The University of Pretoria office was headed by Louis du Plooy until the organisation was disbanded in 1991. The liaison officer was Cleoné Bakker.
