= Presidency of Jacob Zuma =

South African presidential administration from 2009 to 2018

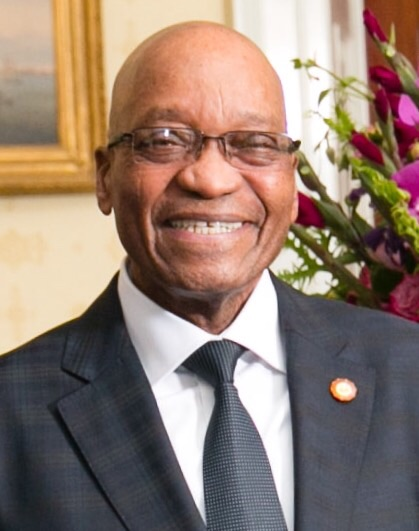
- Presidency of Jacob Zuma; 9 May 2009 – 14 February 2018
- Cabinet: First; Second
- Party: African National Congress
- Election: 2009; 2014

Jacob Zuma's tenure as South Africa's fourth post-apartheid president began on 9 May 2009 and ended on 14 February 2018. He held office under a mandate from the parliamentary caucus of the African National Congress (ANC), which had governed South Africa since 1994 and which won comfortable majorities in the 2009 and 2014 national elections. His presidency was beset by controversy, and he faced, and defeated, an impeachment attempt and a record eight motions of no confidence in the South African Parliament, four of which went to a vote. His party asked him to resign in February 2018, ahead of the constitutional end of his second term.

Zuma's administration launched the R4-trillion National Infrastructure Plan and signed a controversial nuclear power deal with the Russian government, blocked by the Western Cape High Court in 2017. The administration was praised for its progressive HIV/AIDS policy. As president, Zuma increasingly relied on left-wing populist rhetoric, and in his 2017 State of the Nation address announced a new policy of "radical economic transformation". Few of the attendant policy initiatives were implemented before the end of his presidency, but they included land expropriation without compensation, free higher education, and a series of attempted structural reforms in key sectors, involving restrictions on foreign ownership and more stringent black economic empowerment requirements.

In the international arena, Zuma emphasised South-South solidarity and economic diplomacy. The admission of South Africa to the BRICS grouping has been described as a major triumph for him. During South Africa's tenure on the United Nations Security Council in 2011–2012, the administration was criticised for vacillating in its stance on foreign military intervention in the Libyan and Syrian civil wars. In 2015, the South African government hosted Sudanese President Omar al-Bashir in Johannesburg while he was a fugitive from the International Criminal Court (ICC), and, when it was reprimanded for doing so, announced its intention to withdraw from the Rome Statute and the ICC.

During Zuma's second term, his administration was increasingly preoccupied by domestic controversy. In 2014, the Public Protector found that Zuma had improperly benefited from state expenditure on upgrades to his Nkandla homestead, and in 2016 the Constitutional Court ruled that Zuma had thereby failed to uphold the Constitution, leading to calls for his resignation and a failed impeachment attempt in the National Assembly. By early 2016, there were also widespread allegations – investigated by the Zondo Commission between 2018 and 2021 – that the Gupta family had acquired immense and corrupt influence over Zuma's administration, amounting to state capture. In February 2018, the National Executive Committee of the ANC recalled Zuma, threatening to support a motion of no confidence in him if he did not resign. He resigned on 14 February and was replaced by his deputy president, Cyril Ramaphosa.

== National elections ==
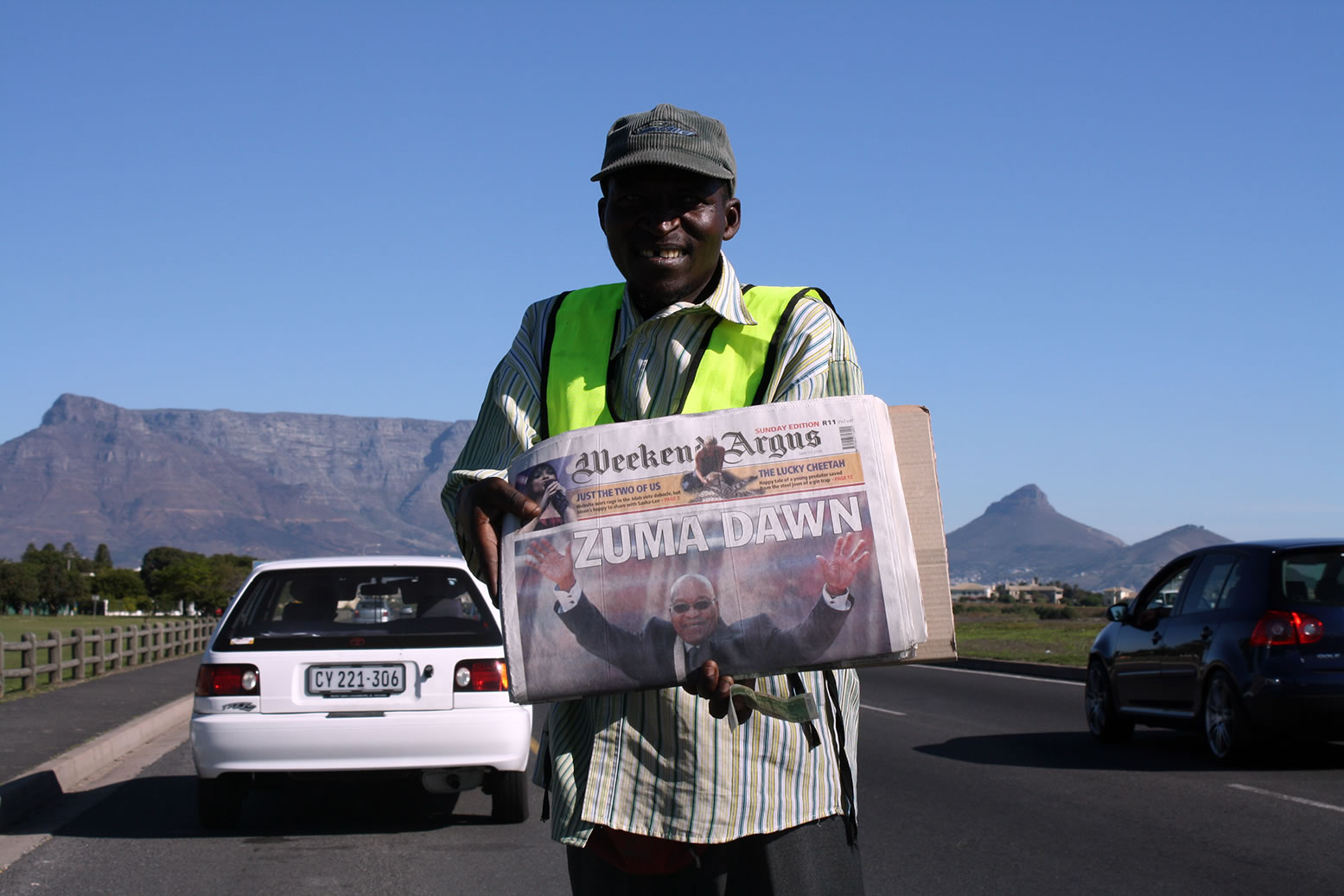
A Cape Town news vendor displays the headline "Zuma Dawn", 10 May 2009.

=== 2009 general election ===
Former Deputy President Jacob Zuma became the presumptive presidential candidate of South Africa's ruling African National Congress (ANC) in December 2007, when he was elected ANC president at the party's 52nd National Conference. Kgalema Motlanthe became president after President Thabo Mbeki's resignation in 2008, but was widely understood to be leading a de facto caretaker administration ahead of the 22 April 2009 general election. In the run-up to the election, the ANC campaigned under the theme "Continuity and Change", and it won the national vote with a slightly diminished majority of 65.90%. On 6 May, Zuma was indirectly elected the President of South Africa in a vote of the National Assembly, and he was sworn in on 9 May.

=== 2014 general election ===
The ANC retained its majority in the 2014 national election, and on 21 May 2014 the National Assembly elected Zuma to a second term as president.

== Administration ==
=== Cabinet ===
Zuma was criticised for a lack of stability in his cabinet – during his two terms in office, he implemented twelve cabinet reshuffles, and some of his appointments unsettled financial markets. His deputy president was Cyril Ramaphosa, who was also the deputy president of the ANC.

=== Constitutional Court ===
==== Sandile Ngcobo ====
In August 2009, Zuma nominated Sandile Ngcobo as Chief Justice of South Africa. In two joint statements, opposition parties the Democratic Alliance (DA), the Congress of the People (COPE), the Independent Democrats and the Inkatha Freedom Party criticised Zuma, claiming that he had not fulfilled the constitutional requirement of consulting the opposition before making a decision. They also expressed support for Dikgang Moseneke, the Deputy Chief Justice and formerly the favourite for the Chief Justice post. Ngcobo's appointment was confirmed in October 2009.

==== Mogoeng Mogoeng ====
In 2011, Zuma again invited controversy by nominating Mogoeng Mogoeng as Ngcobo's successor.

== Domestic affairs ==
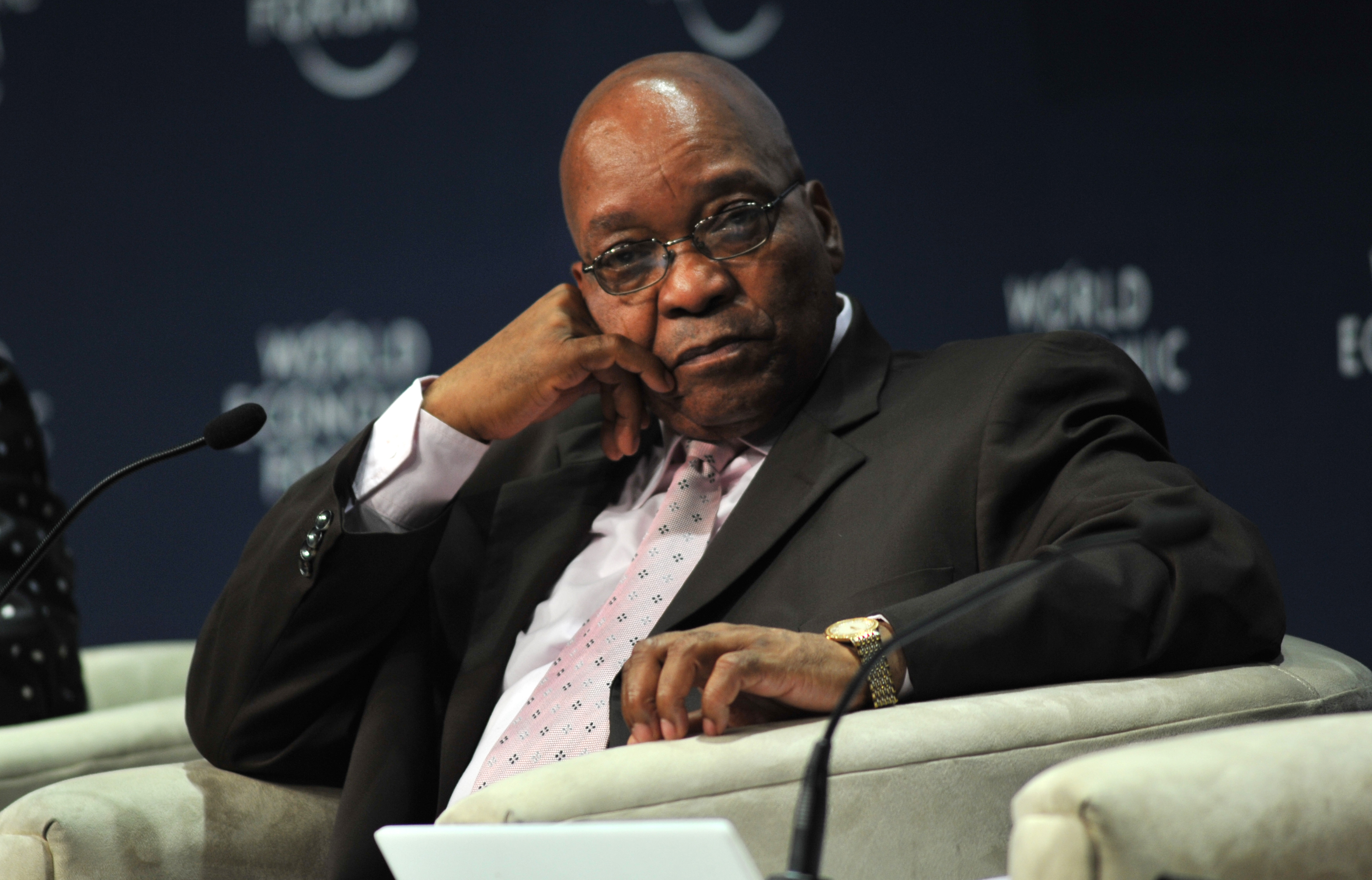
Zuma at the World Economic Forum on Africa, June 2009.

Zuma was inaugurated at the height of the effects in South Africa of the 2008 financial crisis, amid South Africa's first recession since the end of apartheid. Upon taking office, he established the National Planning Commission under the office of the Presidency, chaired by Minister Trevor Manuel. The commission developed the National Development Plan, a long-term strategic vision to coordinate government policy for the achievement of central economic and social objectives by 2030. The plan was released in 2011 and adopted by Zuma's cabinet in 2012, although critics say that the plan was not successfully implemented during his presidency.

Zuma's critics claim that his policies contributed to an escalation in South Africa's debt burden: the debt-to-GDP ratio increased from 28% at the start of his presidency to just over 50% in the week of his resignation. Nedbank, one of South Africa's largest banks, estimates that poor policy decisions, maladministration, and corruption during Zuma's second term alone cost the South African economy R470 billion (US$33.7 billion).

=== Radical economic transformation ===
A former member of the South African Communist Party (SACP), Zuma has described himself as a socialist and became president with the support of a left-wing coalition. Analysts have also claimed that he has bolstered populism in South Africa. From 2017, at the tail-end of his presidency, his rhetoric and policy priorities became markedly further leftist, under what is known as the "radical economic transformation" (RET) programme of the ANC of this period. Zuma announced the new focus on RET during his February 2017 State of the Nation address. Later in 2017, explaining that RET had been adopted as ANC policy and therefore as government policy, Zuma said:

The ANC has defined radical economic transformation as fundamental change in the structures, systems, institutions and patterns of ownership and control of the economy, in favour of all South Africans, especially the poor.

The RET policy was controversial, and some critics claimed that it had popular political appeal but lacked substance. Others claimed that it was used to defend "rent-seeking practices" and the influence of the Gupta family on Zuma's administration. Closely associated was the concept of white monopoly capital.

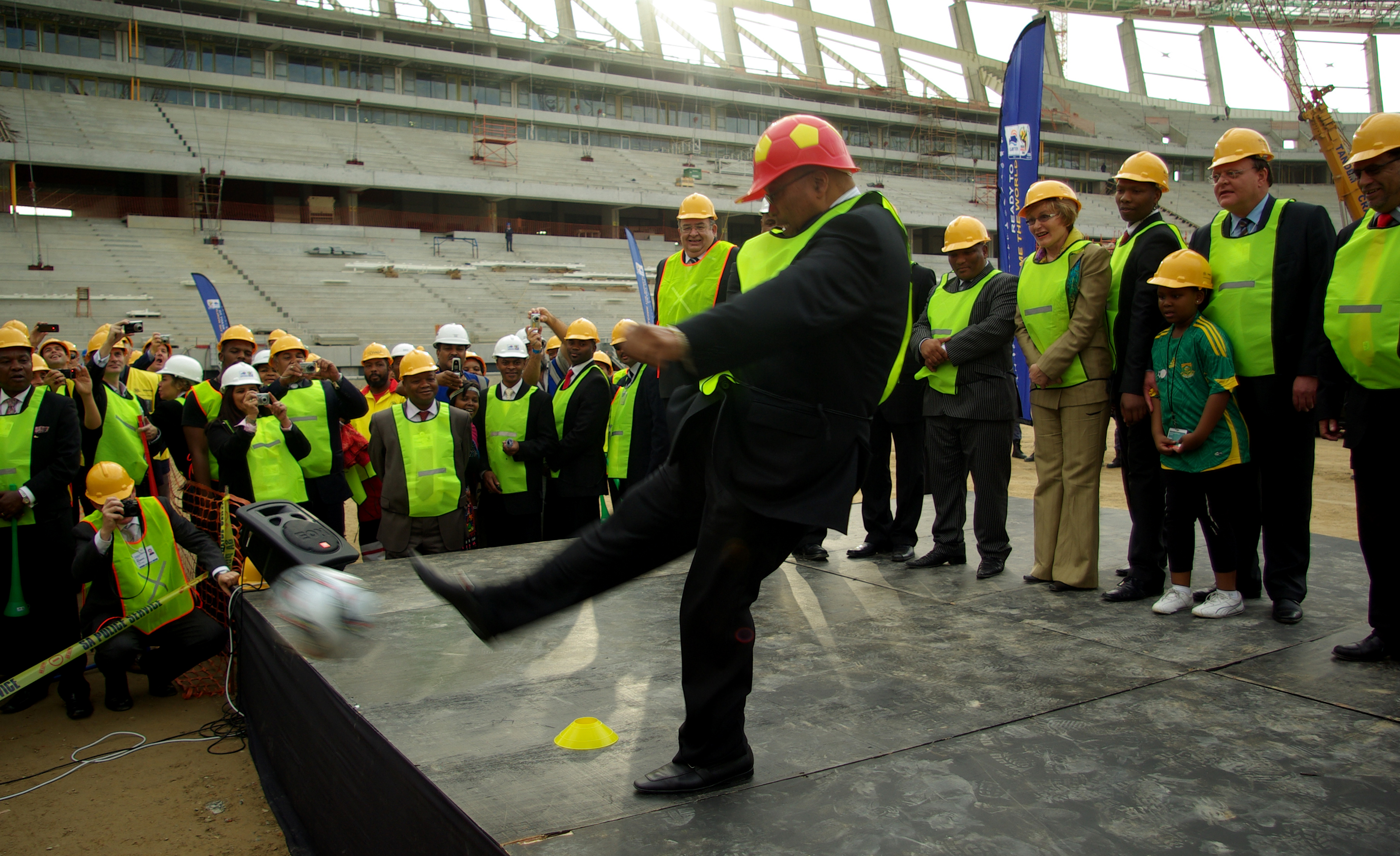
Zuma (centre) on a tour of Green Point Stadium in June 2009, in preparation for the 2010 FIFA World Cup.

=== 2010 FIFA World Cup ===
After winning the selection to host the FIFA World Cup, South Africa had built five new stadiums for the tournament, and five of the existing venues were upgraded. South Africa also improved its public transport infrastructure within the host cities, including Johannesburg's Gautrain and other metro systems, and major road networks were improved. During the tournament, the government implemented special measures to ensure the safety and security of spectators in accordance with standard FIFA requirements, including a temporary restriction of flight operation in the airspace surrounding the stadiums.

=== Social spending ===
Whereas Mbeki's presidency was associated with an era of HIV/AIDS denialism, Zuma has been praised for his HIV/AIDS policy, which has been credited with increasing life expectancy in South Africa. Although he had defended Mbeki's policy while deputy president, Zuma, as president, spoke publicly about the dangers of inaction and denialism. On 1 December 2009, in a public address broadcast live on television, he announced the expansion of the country's HIV testing and treatment programme, in line with World Health Organisation guidelines.

South Africa's social grants programme also expanded under Zuma. The proportion of households that received at least one grant increased from 30% in 2003 to 45.5% midway through Zuma's presidency in 2013.

At the beginning of the ANC's 54th National Conference in December 2017, Zuma unilaterally announced that higher education would be free for students in households whose income was less than R350,000 per year, meeting a central demand of the #FeesMustFall student protests. The decision was expected to cost R57 billion over the next three years, starting with R12.4 billion in 2018, although Zuma resigned from the presidency before the 2018 budget was finalised.

=== Infrastructure ===
In October 2012, Zuma launched the National Infrastructure Plan, which was expected to involve spending of around R4 trillion over the next 15 years, with transport and energy as the biggest expenditure items. Opposition parties welcomed the initiative, although they expressed concerns about the attendant financial burden and about corruption. Zuma chaired the inter-ministerial Presidential Infrastructural Coordinating Committee, and from 2014 chaired the Presidential State-Owned Enterprises Coordinating Council.

Amid ongoing electricity generation shortfalls at state energy utility Eskom, Zuma's government launched, in 2011, the Independent Power Producers Procurement Programme. Under the programme, Eskom would purchase electricity, from both renewable and non-renewable sources, from private producers. By 2017, it had attracted more than R190 billion in investment, but its implementation, especially in the renewable energy sector, has received been criticised by industry insiders.

==== Russian nuclear deal ====
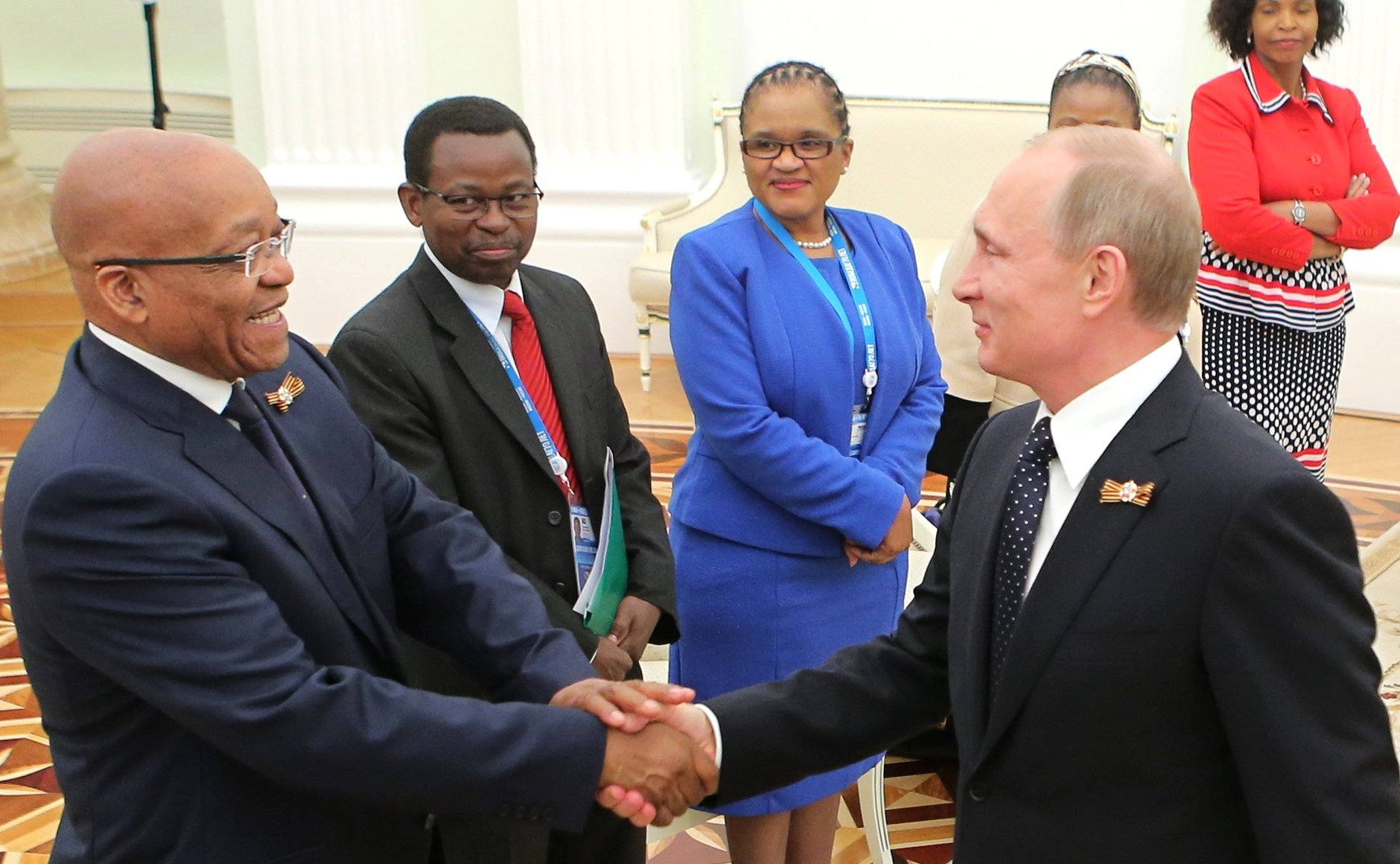
Zuma greets Russian President Vladimir Putin in 2015.

Zuma also expressed support for expanding South Africa's nuclear power programme, and in particular for a proposed nuclear deal with Russia. Agreements between the government and Russian nuclear agency Rosatom were concluded in September 2014, and involved building as many as eight nuclear reactors to generate an additional 9,600 megawatts of power. In 2015, the government said that the programme would have cost about $100 billion (about R1.45 trillion), a cost which many considered unsustainable and which rating agencies later said had contributed to South Africa's credit downgrades. In 2017, adjudicating a legal challenge by environmental activists, the Western Cape High Court ruled that the underlying intergovernmental agreements were unlawful, effectively blocking the deal. Finance Minister Nhlanhla Nene later speculated that Zuma had fired him in 2015 because he had expressed doubts about the nuclear deal.

=== Structural economic reforms ===
==== Private security regulation ====
Zuma's administration pursued a number of structural economic policy reforms, but these have been characterised as "investor-unfriendly" and most met significant opposition. For example, the Private Security Industry Regulation Amendment Bill, introduced by Zuma's government in 2012, would require local private security companies to be majority-owned by South Africans, in violation of the World Trade Organisation General Agreement on Trade in Services. It also afforded the Minister of Police the power to expropriate fully foreign-owned security companies in the national interest. The Democratic Alliance Party, Zuma's opposition, vocally opposed the bill. Others said that it would have negative economic effects, especially since the European Union and United States, some of whose citizens have substantial stakes in the South African private security market, had raised objections to it, threatening to respond with sanctions and not to renew South Africa's membership of the African Growth and Opportunity Act. The bill passed in 2014 but never received assent from Zuma, who said that he was considering the objections. It was signed into law in October 2021 by Zuma's successor, President Ramaphosa.

==== Minerals regulation ====
Attempted reforms to the mining sector also met resistance. In 2014, Parliament passed an amendment to the Mineral and Petroleum Resources Development Act in 2014, which allowed government a 20% "free-carry" interest in all new oil and gas ventures and allowed the minister to designate any minerals as "strategic" resources in order to limit exports of that mineral for the purposes of local beneficiation. However, Zuma referred the bill back to Parliament in early 2015, facing public concern about the bill's constitutionality, compatibility with South Africa's global trade obligations, economic effects, and threats of a legal challenge from the Chamber of Mines. The bill was dropped under Ramaphosa's administration. However, in 2017 Zuma's administration released the cabinet-approved draft Mining Charter, which, among other things, imposed a 1% tax on foreign-owned mines and increased the black economic empowerment ownership requirement in mines from 26% black ownership to 30% black ownership. Amid criticism from the mining industry, Zuma said that the charter would accelerate economic growth and transformation. The Chamber of Mines was challenging the implementation of the charter in court when Zuma resigned, but the charter was revised under Ramaphosa.

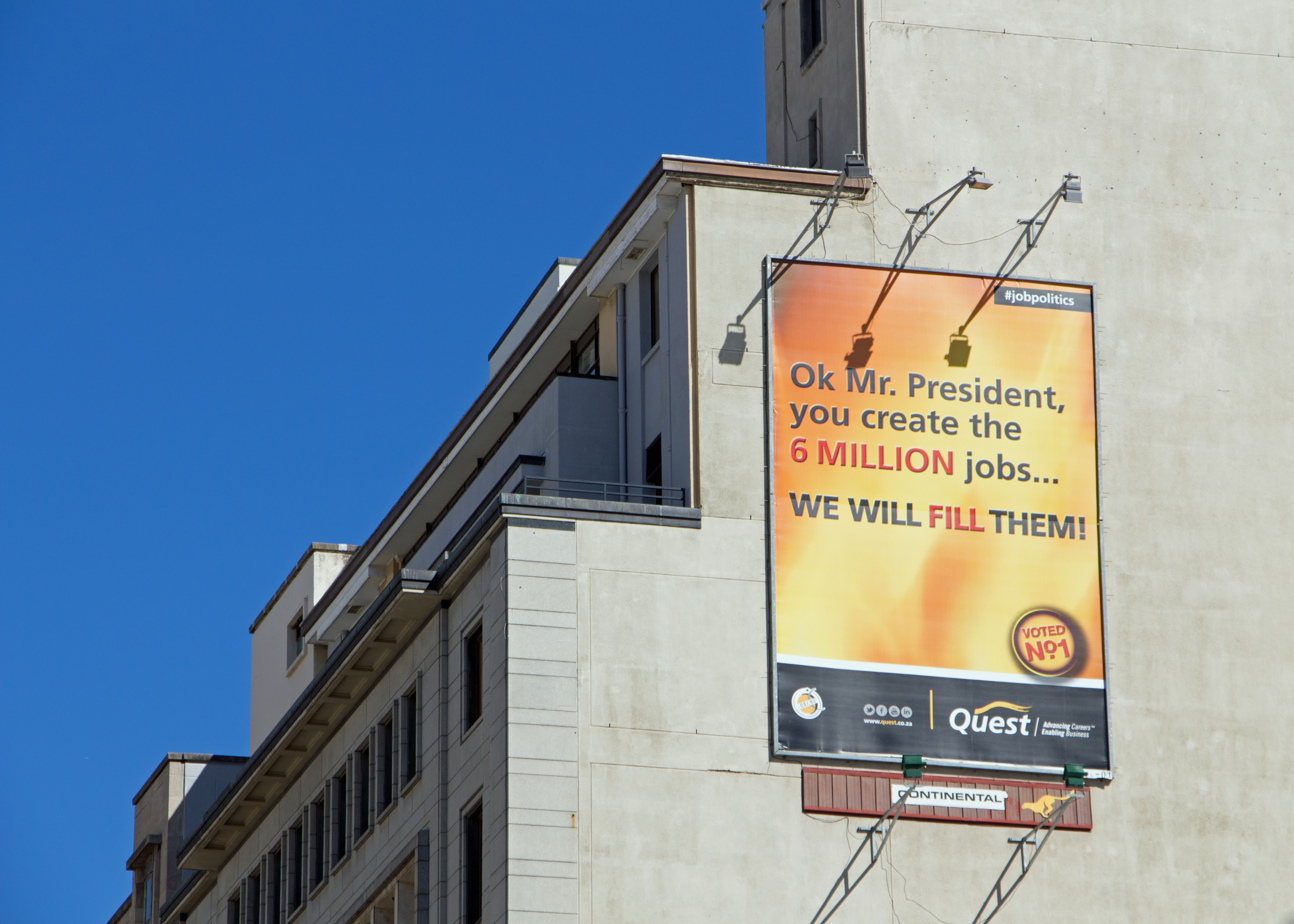
A 2014 billboard in Cape Town responds to Zuma's election promise to create 6 million jobs.

==== Land reform ====
Zuma was attentive to land reform issues throughout his second term, but from early 2017 placed particular public emphasis on his support for land expropriation without compensation. He publicly exhorted the ANC parliamentary caucus to partner with the Economic Freedom Fighters (EFF) for the two-thirds majority needed to amend the Constitution to provide for expropriation without compensation.

==== National minimum wage ====
Also under its RET policy, Zuma's administration pursued consultation processes with labour and business, spearheaded by Ramaphosa (then Deputy President), ahead of the implementation of a national minimum wage. The proposal was approved by cabinet in November 2017, and came into effect after Zuma's resignation.

== Foreign policy ==
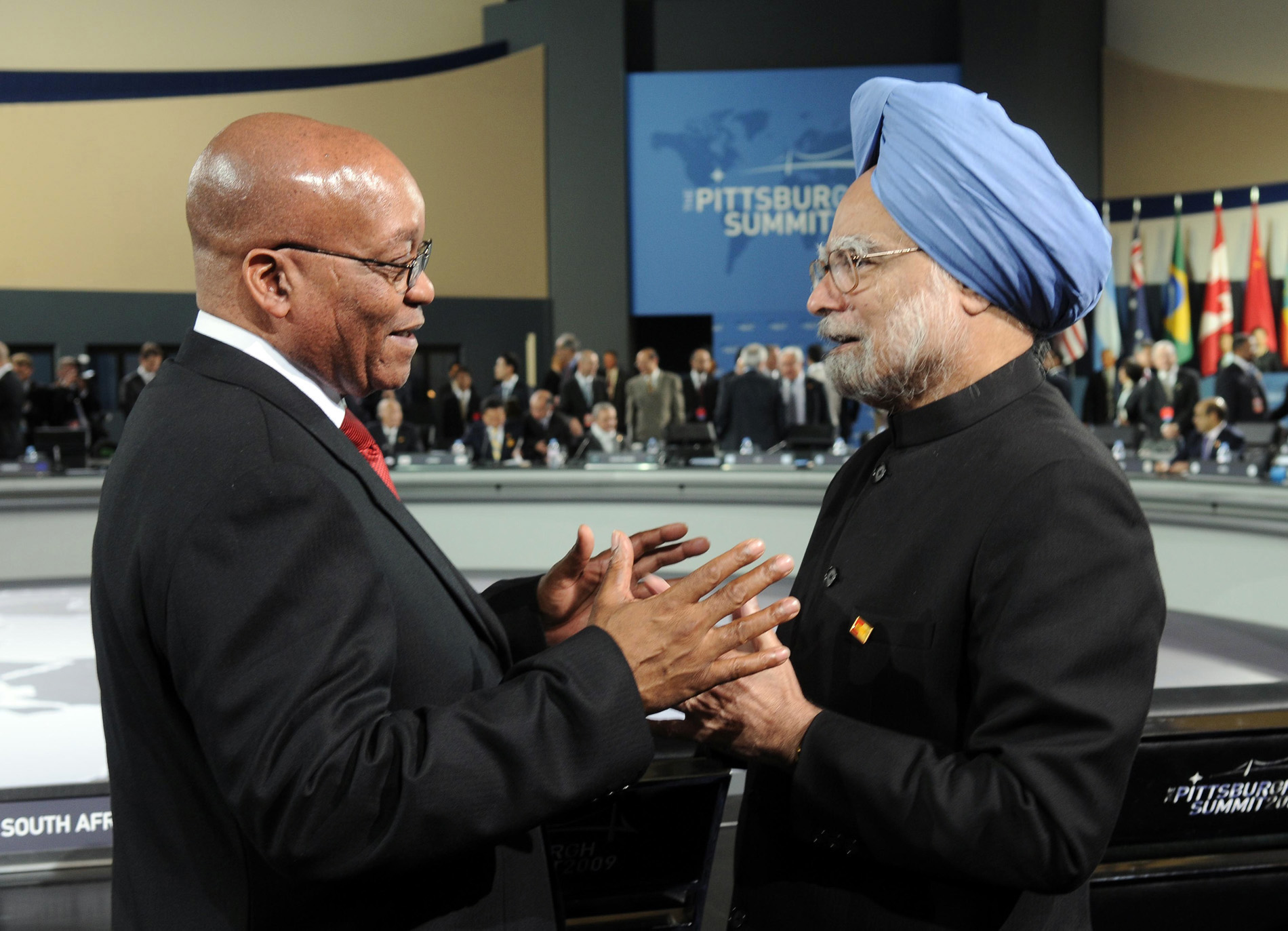
Zuma and Indian Prime Minister Manmohan Singh at the 2009 G20 summit.

Shortly before his inauguration, Zuma told the media that there would be "continuity" and the government's foreign policy would not change. However, there is debate about the extent to which Zuma's foreign policy marked a breach from his predecessor Mbeki's. In August 2009, the new government's strategic framework was published, setting out the broad theme of "Pursuing African Advancement and Enhanced Co-operation" for its foreign policy approach. The phrase "African advancement," like Mbeki's "African agenda," refers primarily to the prioritisation of the objectives, especially the developmental objectives, of African and Global South countries; strategic engagements with the countries and international bodies of the North were primarily conceived of as a mode of promoting such objectives. Similarly, a 2011 White Paper on Foreign Relations, titled Building a Better World: The Diplomacy of Ubuntu, stressed Pan-Africanism and South-South solidarity as the central principles of South Africa's foreign policy. These principles had also been advocated by Mbeki's government.

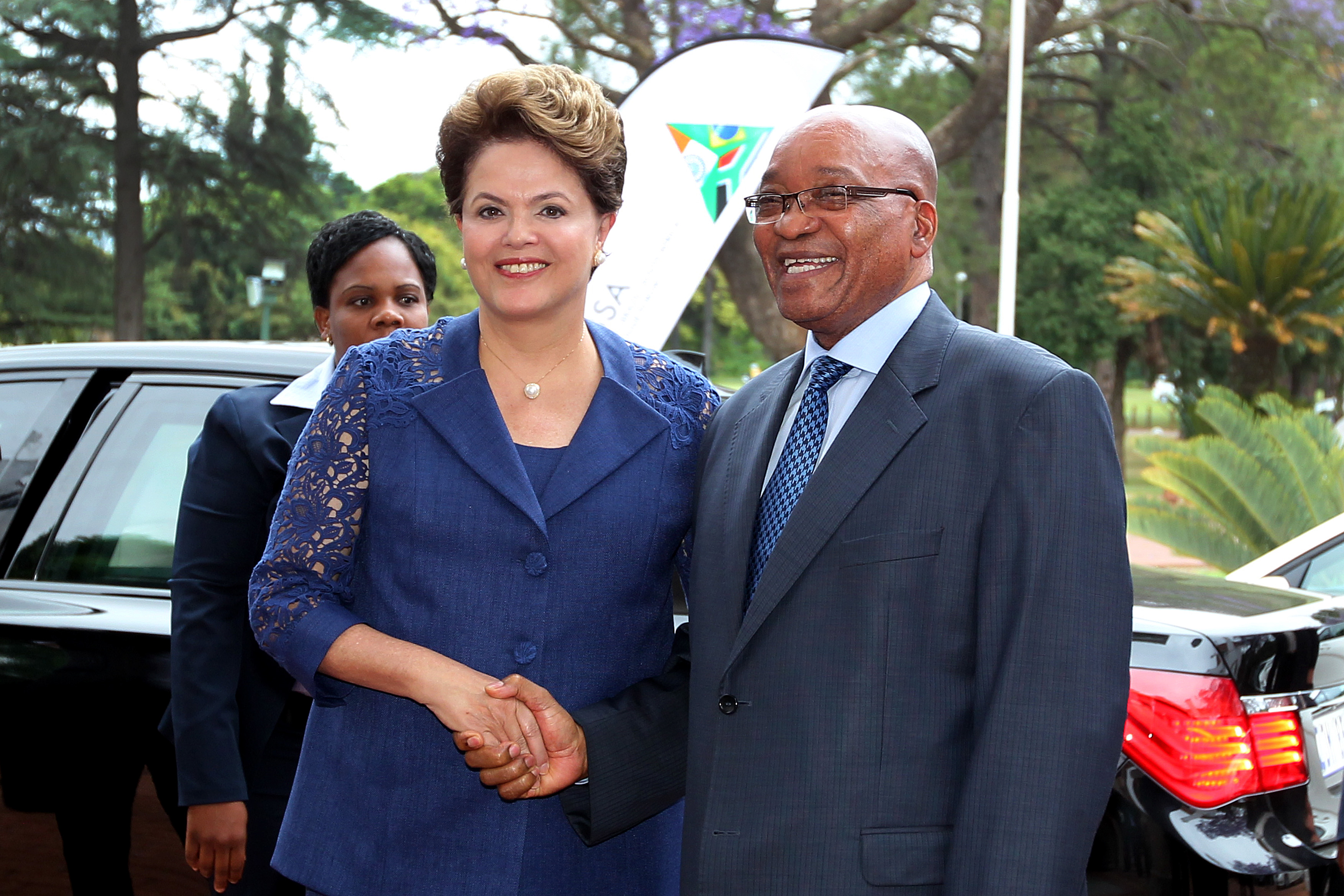
Zuma meets with Brazilian President Dilma Rousseff in 2011.

His approach to foreign policy has been described as notably less centralised than Mbeki's, with Zuma himself playing less of an active role than Mbeki had and with increasing leeway given to the newly renamed Department of International Relations and Cooperation. It has also been described as pursuing specific bilateral relations to a greater extent than advocated by Mbeki, who favoured partnerships with strategic global and regional groupings. In particular, the Zuma administration has been associated with economic diplomacy, with the country's developmental and economic agenda conceived of as central in its engagements with foreign countries. It established the South African Development Partnership Agency (SADPA) to promote developmental partnerships and manage development assistance, although SADPA has been criticised as ineffective. Peter Fabricius has also spoken of a "Zuma doctrine" which advocated a more assertive role, backed with more military power, for South Africa in peacekeeping initiatives in Africa.

Zuma's first state visit as president was to Angola, where he undertook to improve relations with the government of President José Eduardo dos Santos, with whom Mbeki's administration had had a tense relationship.

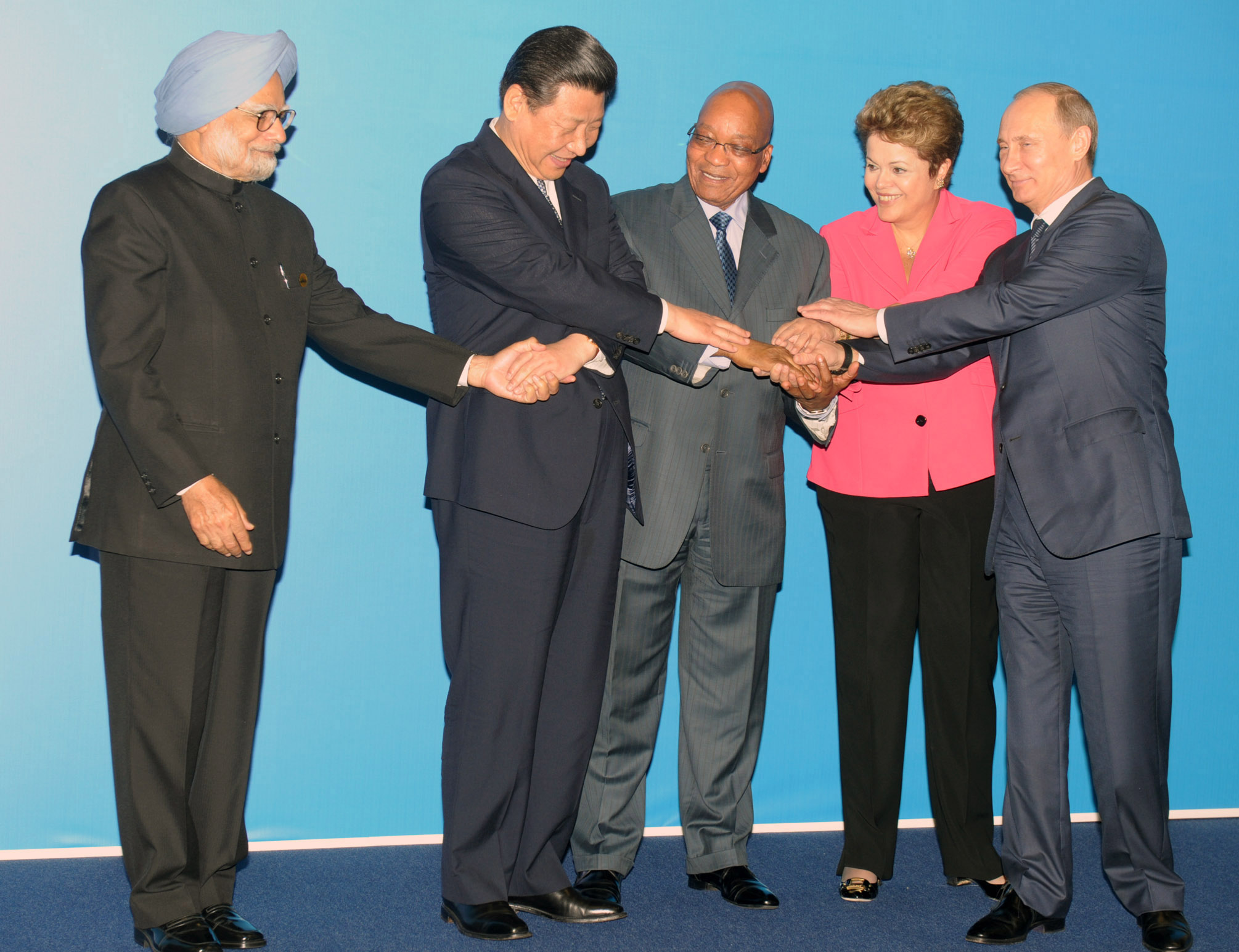
BRICS leaders at the fifth BRICS summit, held in Durban in 2013.

=== BRICS ===
Foreign policy under the Zuma administration was also characterised by a pivot towards the BRIC countries (Brazil, Russia, India, and China), and especially China. In August 2010, Zuma undertook his first state visit to China, which upgraded the countries' relations to a formal and comprehensive bilateral partnership under the Beijing Declaration. An Inter-Ministerial Joint Working Group on China-South Africa Cooperation was established in the same year and staffed by cabinet ministers from both countries, and Chinese President Xi Jinping visited South Africa in March 2013, further cementing the relationship. China became South Africa's biggest trade partner during Zuma's presidency.

In December 2010, South Africa became a formal member of BRIC, which was then renamed BRICS, and Zuma attended the group's third summit meeting in Sanya, China in 2011. South Africa's admission followed a concerted campaign for membership and has been described as "a huge diplomatic coup" and "the most important foreign policy achievement of the Zuma administration".

=== Zimbabwe ===
In 2007 and 2008, Zuma had been openly critical of the repressive policies of Robert Mugabe's ZANU-PF regime in neighbouring Zimbabwe. However, in 2010, as president, Zuma called for international sanctions against Mugabe and his allies to be lifted. After a March 2013 meeting with Mugabe in Pretoria, he highlighted the commonalities between his and Mugabe's political parties, telling the press, "We share the same values, we went through the same route... We believe that our positions as former liberation movements need to be consolidated."

By July 2013, relations between Zuma's government and Mugabe's were tense, as Zuma and the South African Development Community took a harder line on the necessity of democratic reforms in Zimbabwe. Yet, according to the Business Day, relations between the countries remained "cordial" throughout Zuma's presidency. Mugabe and Zuma exchanged state visits, including in 2013, 2015, and 2017, and Mugabe's successor, Emmerson Mnangagwa, visited South Africa in December 2017, shortly after his ascension to the presidency.

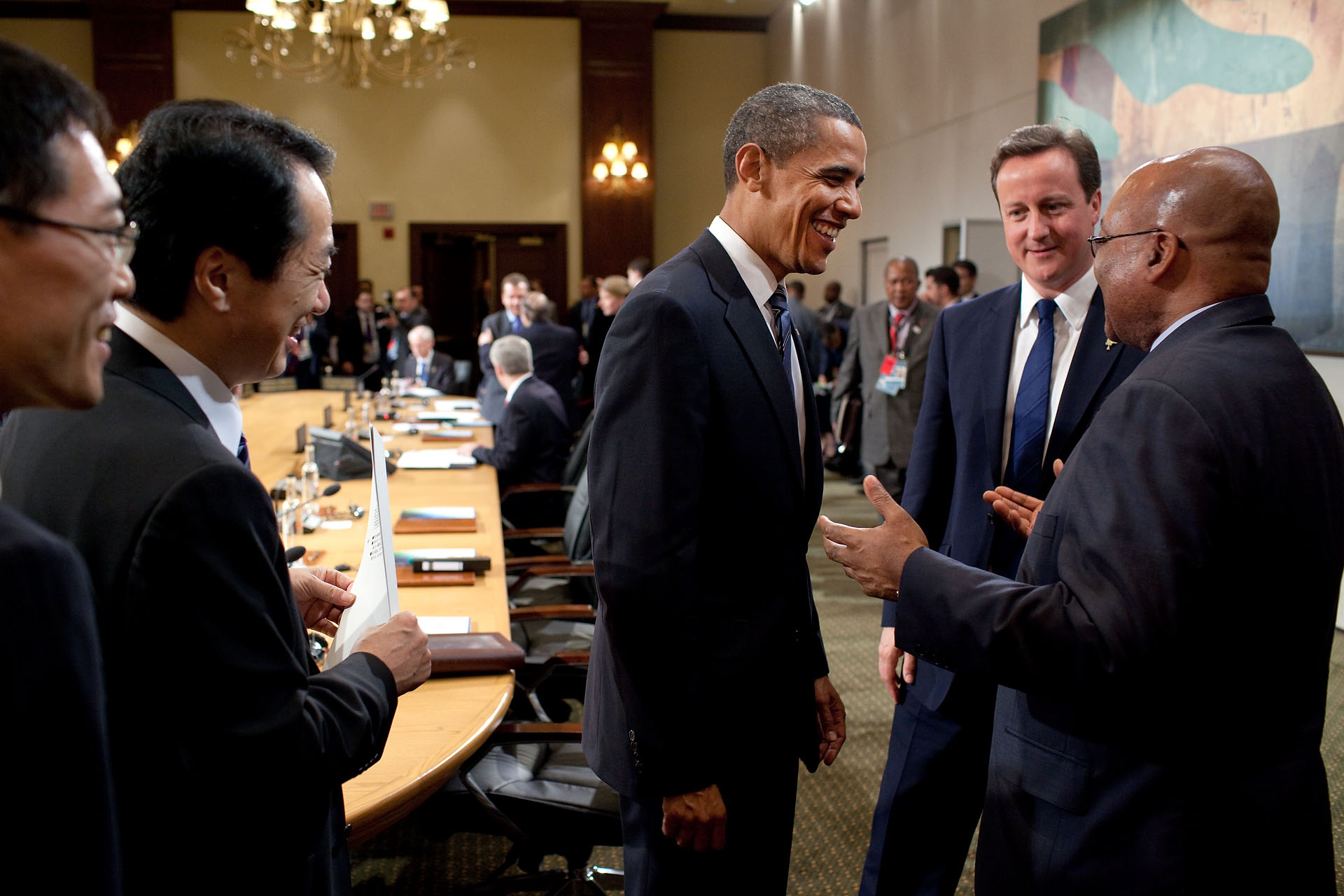
Zuma talking with Barack Obama and David Cameron at a G8 African Outreach meeting in 2010.

=== Foreign intervention in civil conflicts ===
Zuma's administration has been criticised for prevaricating or vacillating in its stance on certain foreign regimes, especially in its attitudes towards international intervention in civil conflicts. In March 2011, South Africa, then a member of the United Nations Security Council, voted in favour of Resolution 1970 and Resolution 1973, imposing sanctions, a no-fly zone, and other measures to suppress the Libyan conflict. When the North Atlantic Treaty Organisation (NATO) used the resolutions as the basis for military intervention in Libya, South Africa condemned the implementation of the very resolutions it had voted for, alleging that NATO was abusing them. Zuma later said that NATO's intervention was responsible for the Libyan refugee crisis.

Later in 2011, South Africa abstained – both in the Security Council and in the General Assembly – from voting on a resolution condemning the Syrian government's use of force against civilians. Three months later, however, in February 2012, it voted in favour of a resolution calling for President Bashar al-Assad to step down. In 2014, Zuma congratulated al-Assad on winning the Syrian presidential election, and in 2016, Nomaindia Mfeketo, the Deputy Minister of International Relations and Cooperation, visited Damascus to meet with al-Assad on Zuma's behalf.

In another example, when the results of the 2010 presidential election in Côte d'Ivoire led to civil conflict, Zuma first appeared to back Angola in its support for former President Laurent Ggagbo, then switched to supporting the position of the African Union (AU), first for a negotiated settlement and then in favour of Alassane Ouattara. After a March 2011 meeting with French President Nicolas Sarkozy in Paris, Zuma expressed decisive support for the installation of Ouattara as president.

=== International Criminal Court ===
South Africa hosted the 25th Summit of the AU in Johannesburg from 7 to 15 June 2015, and on 13 June there were reports that Sudanese President Omar al-Bashir was in attendance. Since 2009, al-Bashir had been a fugitive from the International Criminal Court (ICC), which sought to prosecute him on charges of genocide and crimes against humanity committed in Darfur. With the approval of Zuma's Cabinet, South Africa and the AU had agreed to grant diplomatic immunity to all delegates attending the summit; however, the Rome Statute, to which South Africa is a signatory, obliged South Africa to arrest al-Bashir. While the matter was being adjudicated by a South African High Court, and just after Judge President Dunstan Mlambo ordered al-Bashir's arrest, the state's lawyer told the court that al-Bashir had left the country. His plane left from Waterkloof Air Force Base, presumably with the government's knowledge and reportedly with Zuma's explicit approval.

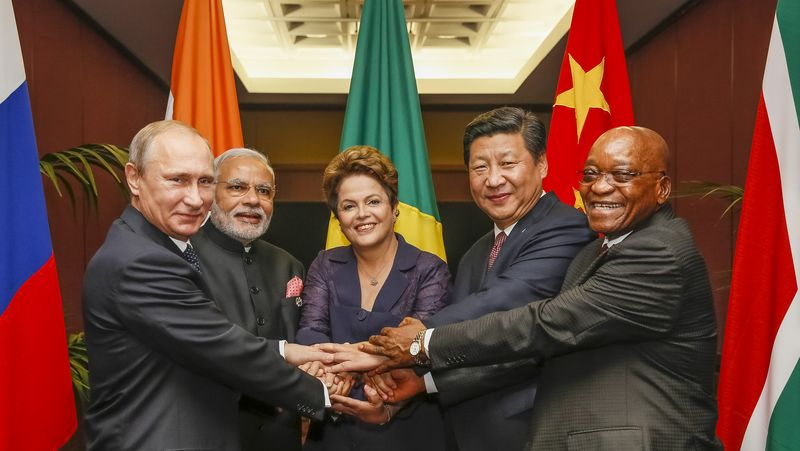
BRICS leaders at the 2014 G-20 summit in Brisbane, Australia.

The government was subsequently reprimanded by the judiciary and the ICC, and many others expressed condemnation. The South African government expressed no remorse, arguing instead that the ICC was used unfairly against African heads of state while failing to hold Western leaders to the same standards. In 2016, it announced in New York that it was withdrawing from the ICC. However, in February 2017, the Pretoria High Court ruled that the government had acted unlawfully in attempting to withdraw without parliamentary approval.

Thus in December 2017 Zuma's administration tabled the International Crimes Bill, which would repeal the legislation which had incorporated the ICC's Rome Statute into South African law. South Africa would thus withdraw from the ICC, and the new legislation provides for new measures by which the South African government would itself prosecute such international crimes as genocide and crimes against humanity. The preamble to the bill provides the rationale for withdrawal from the ICC:

...South Africa, in exercising its international relations with heads of state of foreign countries, particularly heads of state of foreign countries in which serious conflicts occur or have occurred, is hindered by the Implementation of the Rome Statute... South Africa wishes to give effect to the rule of customary international law which recognises the diplomatic immunity of heads of state in order to effectively promote dialogue and the peaceful resolution of conflicts wherever they may occur, but particularly on the African continent.

Because Zuma resigned only weeks after the bill was introduced, his government was not able to secure its passage, although as of 2022 it remained before Parliament.

== Nkandla homestead ==
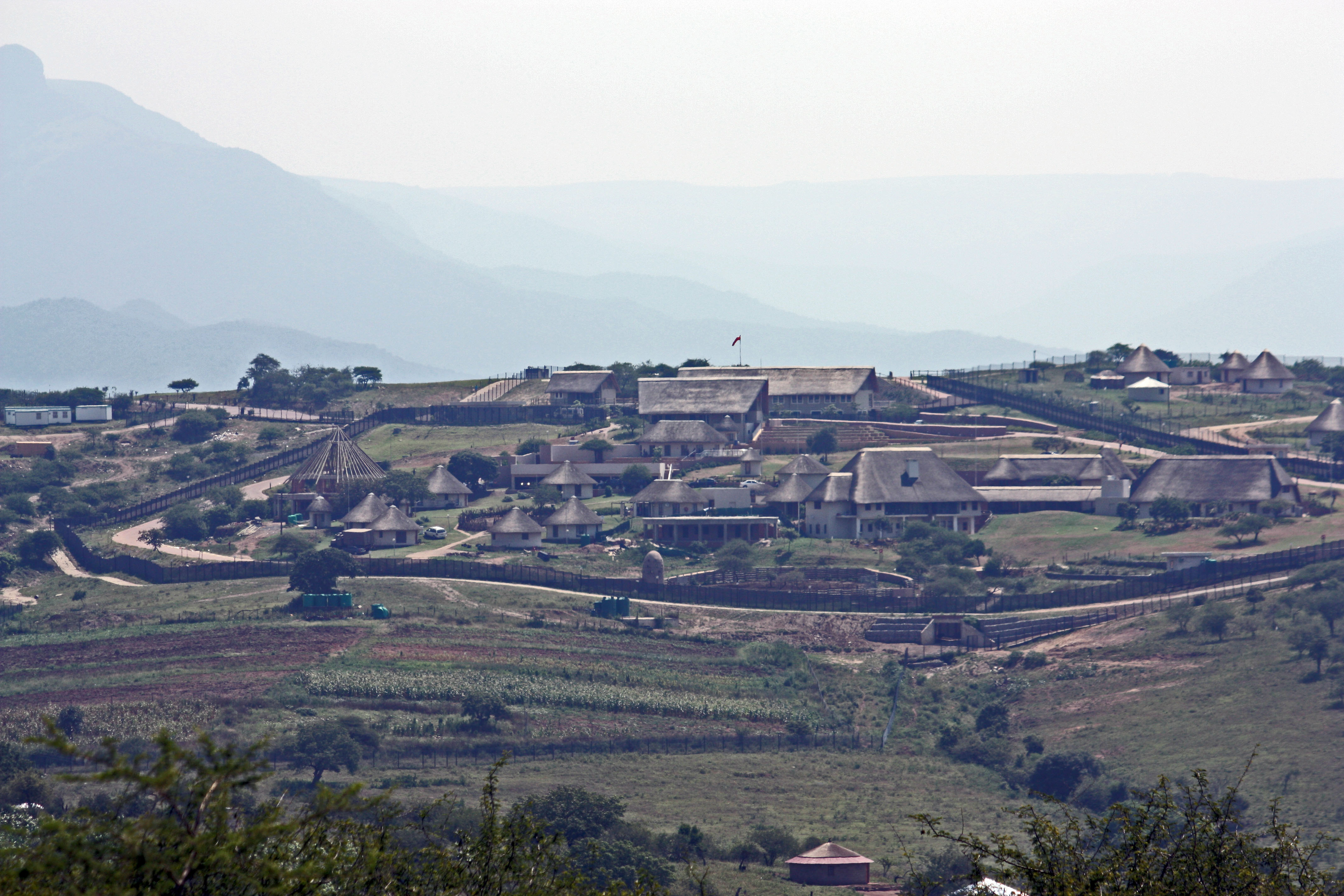
Zuma's Nkandla homestead in KwaZulu-Natal.

=== Public Protector findings: November 2013 ===
Zuma began his second term amid ongoing controversy over what were officially security upgrades, made with state funds, to his private homestead at Nkandla in KwaZulu-Natal. The Mail & Guardian had first reported on the improvements in December 2009. With subsequent media reports, the scandal (sometimes known as "Nkandlagate") burgeoned, and by October 2012 the Public Protector, Thuli Madonsela, was preparing to investigate, pursuant to formal complaints she had received from members of the public. A provisional draft of Madonsela's report, under the working title "Opulence on a Grand Scale," was leaked to the Mail & Guardian in late November 2013. The report said that the cost of the upgrades had escalated to R215 million, with a further R31 million in works outstanding, and that, contrary to the government's claims, many of the state-funded improvements had exceeded Zuma's security needs as president. These included a swimming pool (officially a firepool), cattle kraal, marquee area, and new houses for relatives. It recommended that Zuma should repay the state, and added that Zuma had violated the government's code of ethics on two counts: failing to protect state resources, and misleading Parliament by telling it in November 2012 that the buildings and rooms had been "built by ourselves as family and not by government". The DA was outraged by the report's findings. Madonsela's final report, titled "Secure in Comfort," was released on 19 March 2014, shortly before Zuma's reelection, and mirrored the provisional report in its substantive aspects.

=== Constitutional Court findings: March 2016 ===
However, further investigations were contradictory or inconclusive, and a parliamentary ad hoc committee exonerated Zuma. Opposition parties continued to demand that Zuma implement the Public Protector's recommendations and repay the state for the upgrades, leading ultimately to a physical struggle in Parliament, during Zuma's 2015 State of the Nation address, between security guards and EFF Members of Parliament, who had continually interrupted Zuma to ask when he was going to "pay back the money". The EFF and DA applied for legal recourse to compel Zuma to implement Madonsela's report, and the Constitutional Court found in their favour on 31 March 2016. In EFF v Speaker; DA v Speaker, the full court agreed that Madonsela's report was binding and that Zuma and the National Assembly had failed to uphold the country's Constitution. The court ordered Zuma to repay to the state an amount to be determined by the National Treasury.

In a public address on 1 April, Zuma welcomed the judgment, apologised to the country, and said that he had always accepted the Public Protector's reports were binding. According to legal academic Pierre de Vos, other parts of his statement seriously misinterpreted the judgement, as did the Presidency's claim that Zuma had not been found to have violated his oath of office.

=== Impeachment vote: April 2016 ===
The court's finding that Zuma had failed to uphold the Constitution provided possible grounds for impeachment, and opposition leaders Julius Malema and Mmusi Maimane promptly called for Zuma's resignation. On 5 April 2016, the ANC-controlled Parliament defeated a DA-sponsored motion for impeachment by a significant 143–233 margin. There was some surprise that even Zuma's opponents in the ANC – such as Ramaphosa, Finance Minister Pravin Gordhan, and Deputy Finance Minister Mcebisi Jonas – had voted against the motion. During the debate before the vote, ANC politicians spoke in Zuma's defence, with Deputy Justice Minister John Jeffery arguing that Zuma was not guilty of "serious misconduct." ANC Chief Whip Jackson Mthembu agreed that Zuma's breach of the Constitution was not "serious" enough to warrant impeachment, and ANC Secretary General Gwede Mantashe, speaking for the party's Top Six leaders, said that the move to impeach Zuma was "rather an over-exaggeration". The ANC Women's League had already released a statement expressing its "unshaken" faith in Zuma.

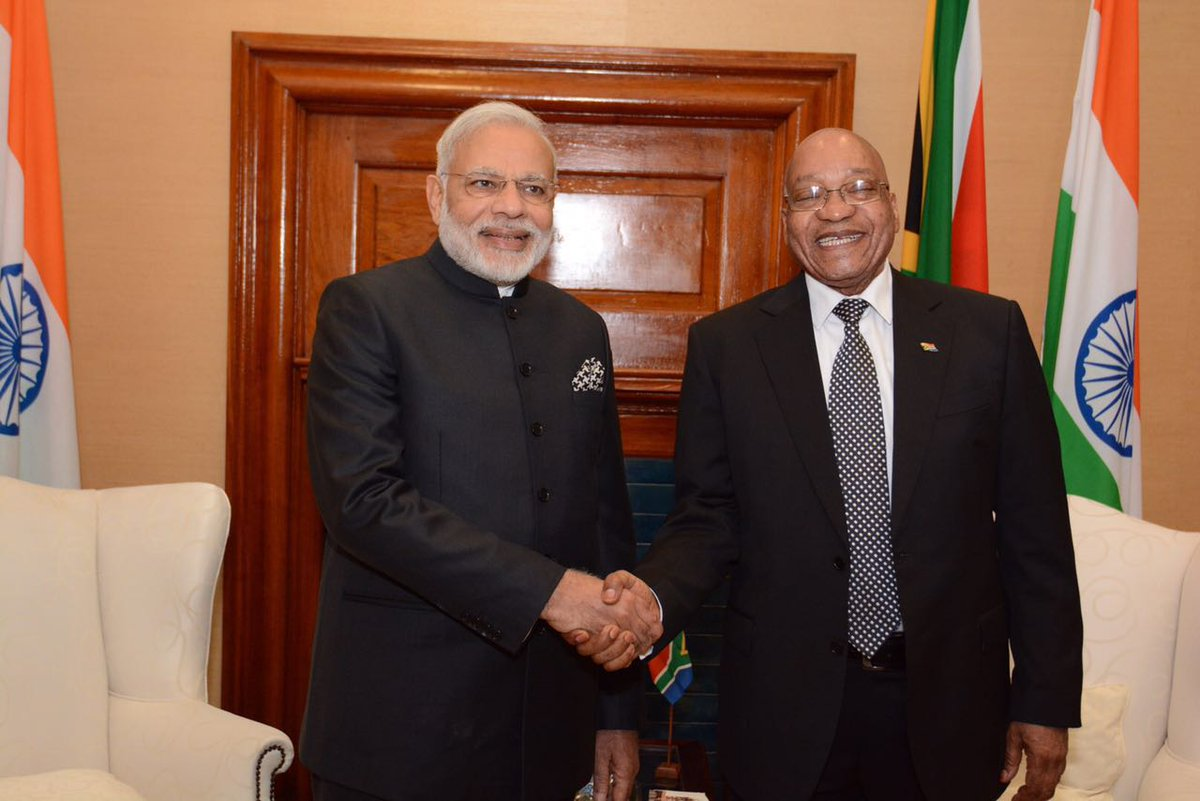
Zuma and Indian Prime Minister Narendra Modi in South Africa in 2016.

=== Backlash: April 2016 ===
On 12 April 2016, journalist Max du Preez observed that, following the Nkandla judgement and unrelated allegations of state capture, "the balance of power has turned irrevocably against Zuma," and the backlash was serious enough that many commentators thought it possible that Zuma would be deposed (or "recalled") at a later date by the ANC itself. ANC partner the SACP expressed dissatisfaction with how Zuma and the ANC had handled the Nkandla saga, and COPE announced that it would boycott parliamentary proceedings in protest of the ANC caucus's refusal to take action against Zuma. Prominent civil society figures, including retired judge Zak Yacoob, former Congress of South African Trade Unions (COSATU) leader Zwelinzima Vavi, and the South African Council of Churches, called for Zuma to resign. More strikingly, however, despite the ANC's support for Zuma in the impeachment vote, public criticism of Zuma also emanated from inside the ANC, to the disapproval of some Zuma allies. Some ANC members booed Zuma at his next public appearance, and a series of senior ANC and struggle stalwarts publicly called for his resignation, including Ahmed Kathrada, Ronnie Kasrils, Trevor Manuel, and Cheryl Carolus. The Gauteng ANC, led by noted Zuma critic Paul Mashatile, formally resolved that Zuma should resign; doubts were raised about Zuma's leadership in other branches, even within his former strongholds like Limpopo; and an internal ANC memorandum sent by party veterans to the Top Six allegedly demanded Zuma's recall and compared him to detested apartheid-era State President P. W. Botha.

== State capture allegations ==
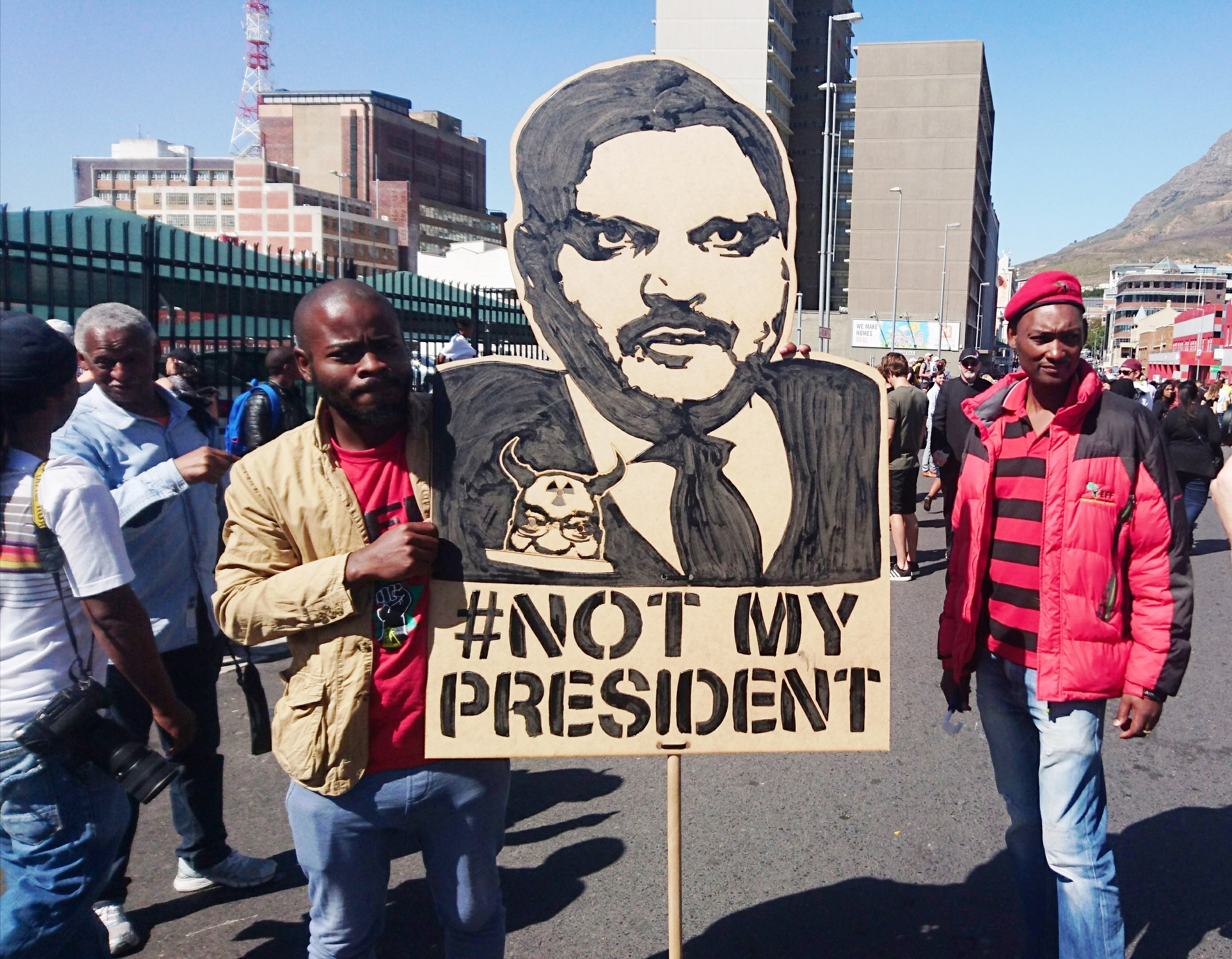
Two EFF members carry a placard depicting Atul Gupta at a Zuma Must Fall protest in Cape Town, April 2017.

=== The Gupta family ===
==== Waterkloof Air Force Base landing: April 2013 ====
Zuma's close and allegedly corrupt relationship with the Gupta family, also known ANC donors, became a major source of discontent both within the ANC and among the South African public. This relationship received widespread public attention as early as April 2013, when the media reported that the Guptas had landed an Airbus A330 at Waterkloof Air Force Base without formal authorisation. The plane was carrying guests from India to a wedding of a Gupta relative in South Africa, and the guests allegedly received police escorts. ANC politicians such as Jeff Radebe joined opposition parties in condemning the unauthorised landing. The political influence of the Guptas was one issue thought to have motivated a wave of anti-government protests in October 2015, and, at Zuma's February 2016 State of the Nation address, the EFF coined the phrase "Zupta", a portmanteau of "Zuma" and "Gupta", when they disrupted the event by repeatedly chanting "Zupta must fall."

==== Alleged control of cabinet appointments: March 2016 ====
In early March 2016, Deputy Finance Minister Mcebisi Jonas alleged that, in November 2015, shortly before Nene's dismissal, the Guptas had offered him the position of Finance Minister. The English Financial Times broke the story on 8 March 2016 in a comprehensive piece about the Guptas' political influence. The next week, former ANC MP Vytjie Mentor claimed in a Facebook post that the Guptas had also offered her a cabinet position while she was visiting their house in Saxonwold, Johannesburg – specifically, she said she was offered Barbara Hogan's job as Minister of Public Enterprises. She claimed that Zuma had been in another room of the house at the time of the offer. The Guptas denied the allegations, as did Zuma, who reminded Parliament that only he had the power to appoint ministers. He also said he did not recall ever meeting Mentor. Shortly thereafter, the former director-general of Government Communication and Information System, Themba Maseko, told the Sunday Times that Zuma had asked him to "help" the Guptas and that the Guptas had subsequently asked him to channel government advertising tenders to their newspaper, the New Age.

The allegations led to renewed allegations of state capture of the Zuma administration by the Gupta family. Mantashe announced that the ANC would conduct an internal investigation, which made no substantive findings. The SACP called for a public inquiry, and in May a group of 45 former director-generals of government departments wrote a letter to Zuma, Ramaphosa, and two ministers to make the same request.

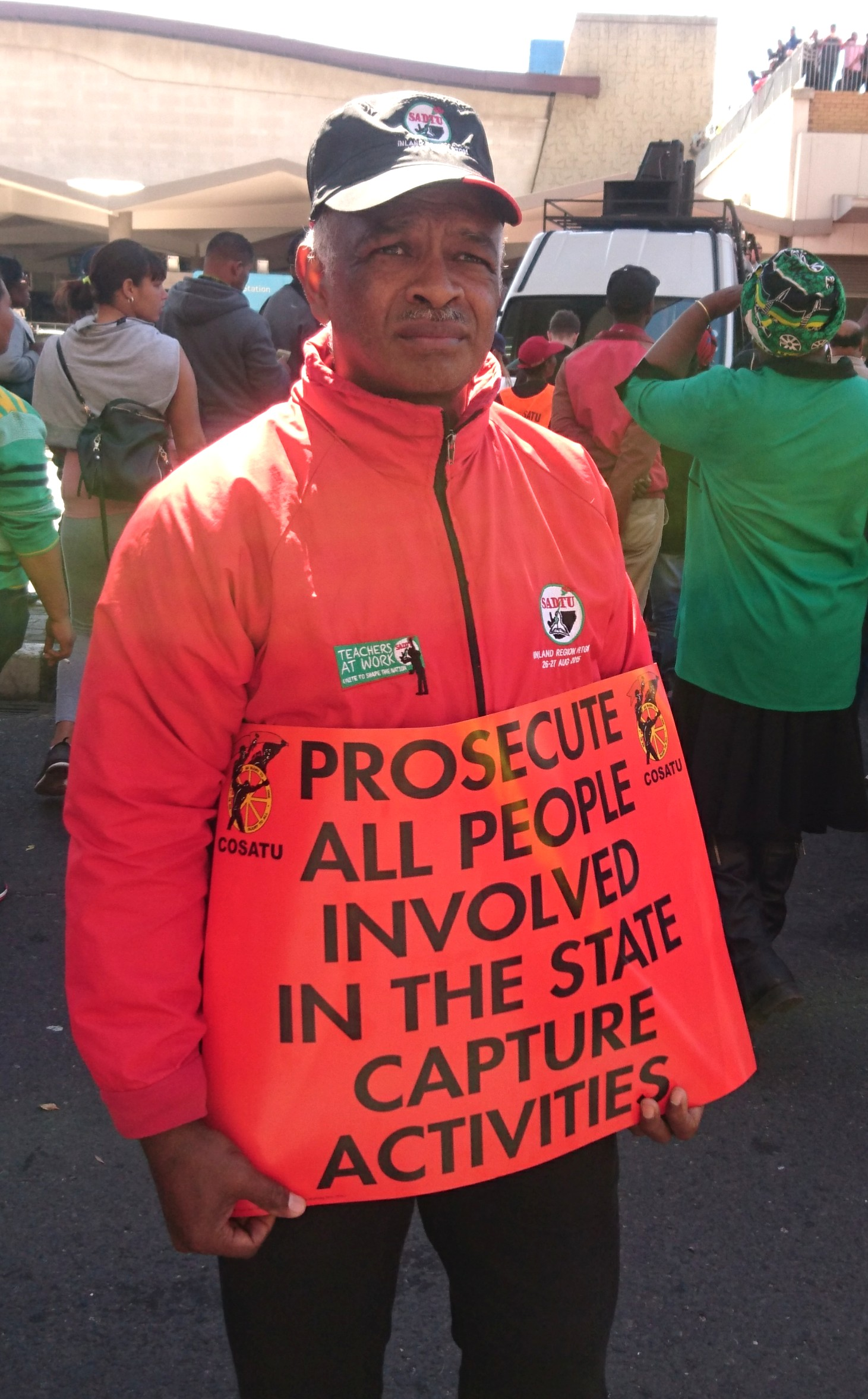
COSATU organised a protest against state capture in Cape Town on 27 September 2017.

==== Gupta Leaks: 2017–2018 ====
In early 2017, the Daily Maverick and investigative journalism unit amaBhungane (and later News24), through human rights lawyer Brian Currin and his anonymous clients, gained access to a large cache of between 100,000 and 200,000 emails and other documents from inside the Guptas' businesses. From mid-2017 well into 2018, the leaks were used as evidence for a large series of articles about corrupt or otherwise improper relationships between the Guptas and ANC politicians, including Zuma. They are now in the possession of the Zondo Commission.

=== Public Protector findings: November 2017 ===
In mid-March 2016, Public Protector Madonsela launched an investigation into state capture after receiving formal complaints from members of the public and the leader of the opposition. The report of the investigation, titled "State of Capture," was released in November 2017, and found prima facie evidence implicating Zuma and other state officials in various improprieties, including improper relationships with the Gupta family. The report also recommended that Zuma should appoint a full commission of inquiry into state capture. Zuma applied to have Madonsela's report overturned in the high court, which dismissed his application and ordered him to appoint a commission.

=== Zondo Commission: January 2018 ===
In line with the judicial directive to comply with Madonsela's recommendations, Zuma established the Zondo Commission in January 2018, just over a month before he resigned. The commission completed its work during the term of Zuma's successor, President Ramaphosa.

== Cabinet reshuffles ==
=== Dismissal of Nhlanhla Nene: December 2015 ===
On 9 December 2015, Zuma replaced Finance Minister Nhlanhla Nene with the little-known backbencher Des van Rooyen. Opposition parties angrily alleged that Nene was fired because he had vetoed or questioned suspect or controversial uses of public funds, including the proposed nuclear deal with Russia, the proposed purchase of a multi-million-rand presidential private jet, and various proposals at the state-owned airline, South African Airways (SAA). Nene was known to have clashed with SAA chairperson Dudu Myeni over his rejection of a board proposal to restructure a re-fleeting agreement with Airbus, as well as over a proposal, reportedly from Zuma himself, to initiate a direct SAA flight between South Africa and Khartoum, the Sudanese capital.

The reaction of international markets to the reshuffle was strongly negative, and a senior Treasury official later told the Zondo Commission that Nene's dismissal had negatively affected the South African economy both in the immediate term and in the long term. The value of the rand fell dramatically, from R14.96 to the US dollar on 8 December to R15.38, a record low, on 10 December. The JSE fell by an estimated R180 billion over the same period, and the banking index fell by nearly 19 per cent. S&P had recently downgraded South Africa's credit rating to BBB, the lowest possible investment-grade rating, with a "negative" outlook, and there were fears that the reshuffle would trigger a further downgrade to junk status. Indeed, an S&P director warned that further such "policy mistakes" could cause a downgrade to junk status.

Over the weekend, Zuma reportedly received submissions from business, labour, and ANC members; with COSATU and SACP leaders, and a delegation of senior ANC members, reportedly advising Zuma to reverse his decision. Indeed, there were rumours that Deputy President Ramaphosa, who was absent from an ANC gala on Saturday, would resign if the decision was not reversed, although Ramaphosa denied the rumours. On Sunday 13 December, Zuma announced that van Rooyen would be replaced, after only four days in office, by former minister of finance Pravin Gordhan. Commentators said that the saga was a clear miscalculation on Zuma's part and had weakened him politically, with the Daily Maverick printing that Zuma had been "exposed as a weak leader who acted recklessly without proper advice, appointing a rookie to act as a political handyman."

In February 2016, media reports alleged that two of van Rooyen's senior advisers had links to, or had even been appointed by, the Gupta family. This contributed to concerns that Nene's dismissal had been an attempt to facilitate state capture by Zuma's political and business associates.

=== Dismissal of Pravin Gordhan: March 2017 ===
In the early hours of 31 March 2017, the Presidency announced a major cabinet reshuffle, affecting ten ministers – five of whom were dismissed – and ten deputy ministers. Most notably, respected Finance Minister Gordhan was replaced by Malusi Gigaba; his deputy Jonas, who had alleged corruption by the Guptas a year earlier, was also fired. Senior ANC leaders, including Deputy President Ramaphosa, severely criticised the reshuffle. The SACP called for Zuma's resignation, and its Second Deputy General Secretary, Solly Mapaila, called for the ANC itself to act to remove Zuma on a motion of no confidence. The response of the markets was also poor. The value of the rand fell, and the yield on the government's benchmark R186 bond surged, from 8.355% to 8.84%. On 3 April, S&P downgraded South Africa's sovereign credit rating to BB+, a speculative-grade or "junk status" rating. On 7 April, another of the Big Three credit rating firms, Fitch, followed suit.

== Domestic opposition ==
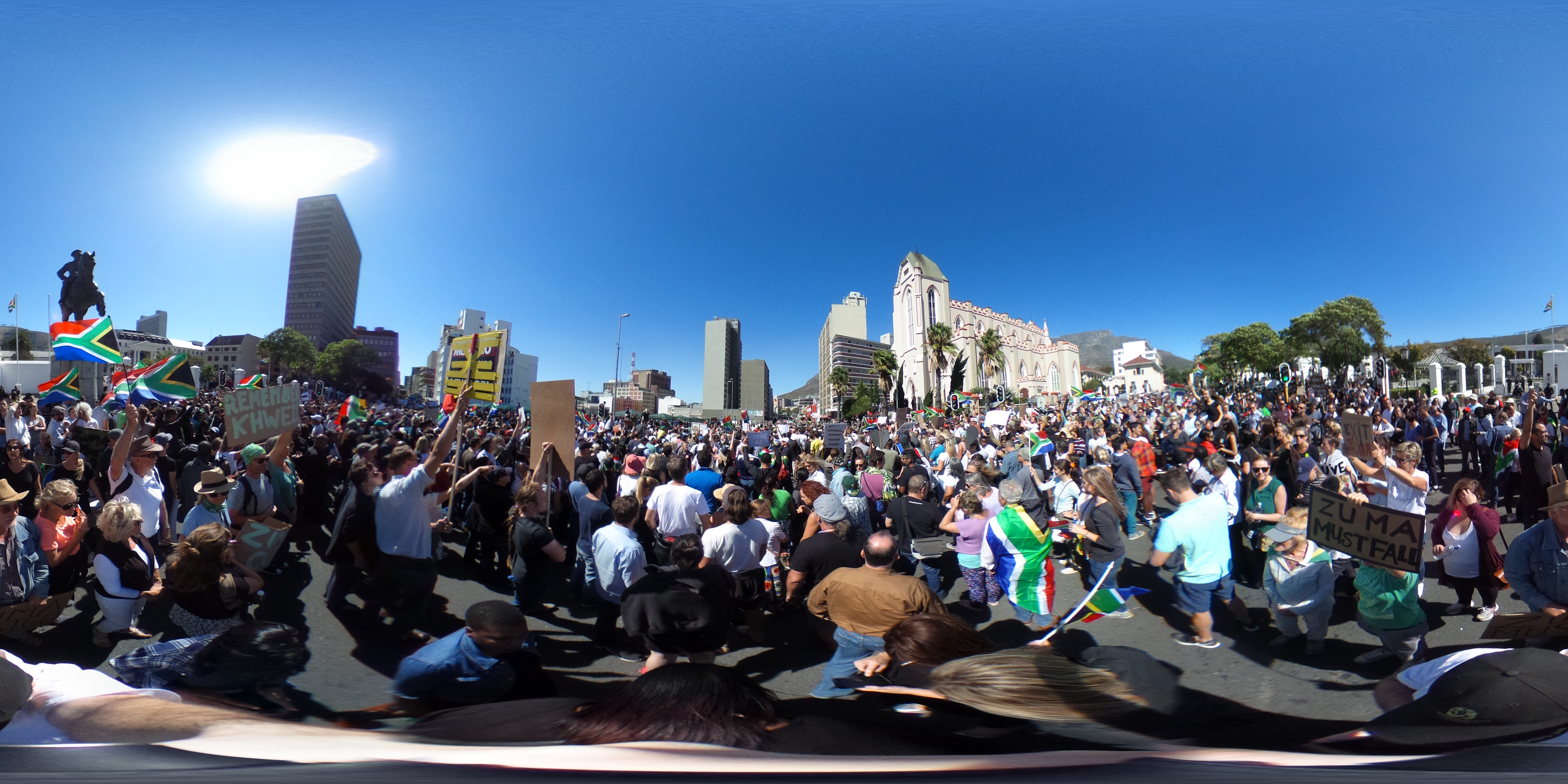
A 360° photograph of the protests in front of the Houses of Parliament.

=== Zuma Must Fall protests: April 2017 ===
On 7 April 2017, protests against Zuma and his government took place in several of South Africa's major cities, with corruption the March cabinet reshuffle cited as central motivating factors. The largest marches were at the Union Buildings in Pretoria (attended by about 25,000 people) and at the Houses of Parliament in Cape Town (attended by between 12,000 and 20,000 people). Between 2,000 and 3,000 pro-Zuma counter-protesters gathered in the area around the ANC's headquarters at Luthuli House in Johannesburg. Defence Minister Nosiviwe Mapisa-Nqakula estimated that about 60,000 people had attended the protests nationwide.

Another march on the Union Buildings on 12 April, Zuma's birthday, was organised by a coalition of seven opposition parties, including the DA and EFF, and also attracted tens of thousands of protesters – the Mail & Guardian said that it was "possibly the largest march in post-apartheid history."

=== Motions of no confidence: 2010–2018 ===
During Zuma's presidency, no fewer than eight motions of no confidence were tabled against him in the National Assembly. Four of the motions, all between March 2015 and August 2017, went to a vote, in which they failed to receive the required majority (201 votes in the 400-seat assembly) and were defeated. Below is a list of the motions proposed:

Motions of no confidence proposed against President Jacob Zuma
Date	Type	Sponsor	Result
18 March 2010	Motion	COPE	Amended by the ANC to a motion of confidence, which passed 242–83, with 6 abstentions.
November 2012	Motion	DA	Not scheduled, leading to a legal battle.
March 2015	Motion	Agang SA	Withdrawn, on the basis that Speaker Baleka Mbete refused to recuse herself from presiding over the debate.
17 March 2015	Vote	DA	Defeated 113–211, with 8 abstentions.
1 March 2016	Vote	DA	Defeated 99–225, with 22 abstentions, after some opposition politicians boycotted the vote.
10 November 2016	Vote	DA	Defeated 126–214, 1 abstention.
9 August 2017	Vote	DA	Defeated 177–198, 9 abstentions.
February 2018	Motion	EFF	Scheduled for debate on 15 February, but fell away after Zuma's resignation.

The DA also attempted unsuccessfully to impeach Zuma (formally a removal from office under Section 89 of the Constitution) in April 2016 after the EFF v Speaker judgement in the Constitutional Court.

The August 2017 motion of no confidence was notable because it was the first allowed to proceed by secret ballot, following the Constitutional Court's judgment in UDM v Speaker of the National Assembly earlier that year. The motion received the most support of any such motion during Zuma's presidency, with 177 votes in favour; although the ANC had 249 MPs, only 198 MPs voted against the motion. Political analyst Stephen Grootes told the Guardian that between 25 and 30 ANC MPs appeared to have defied the ANC's instruction to vote against the motion, and the Mail & Guardian guessed that 26 MPs had voted in favour while nine abstained.

=== Recall by the ANC: February 2018 ===
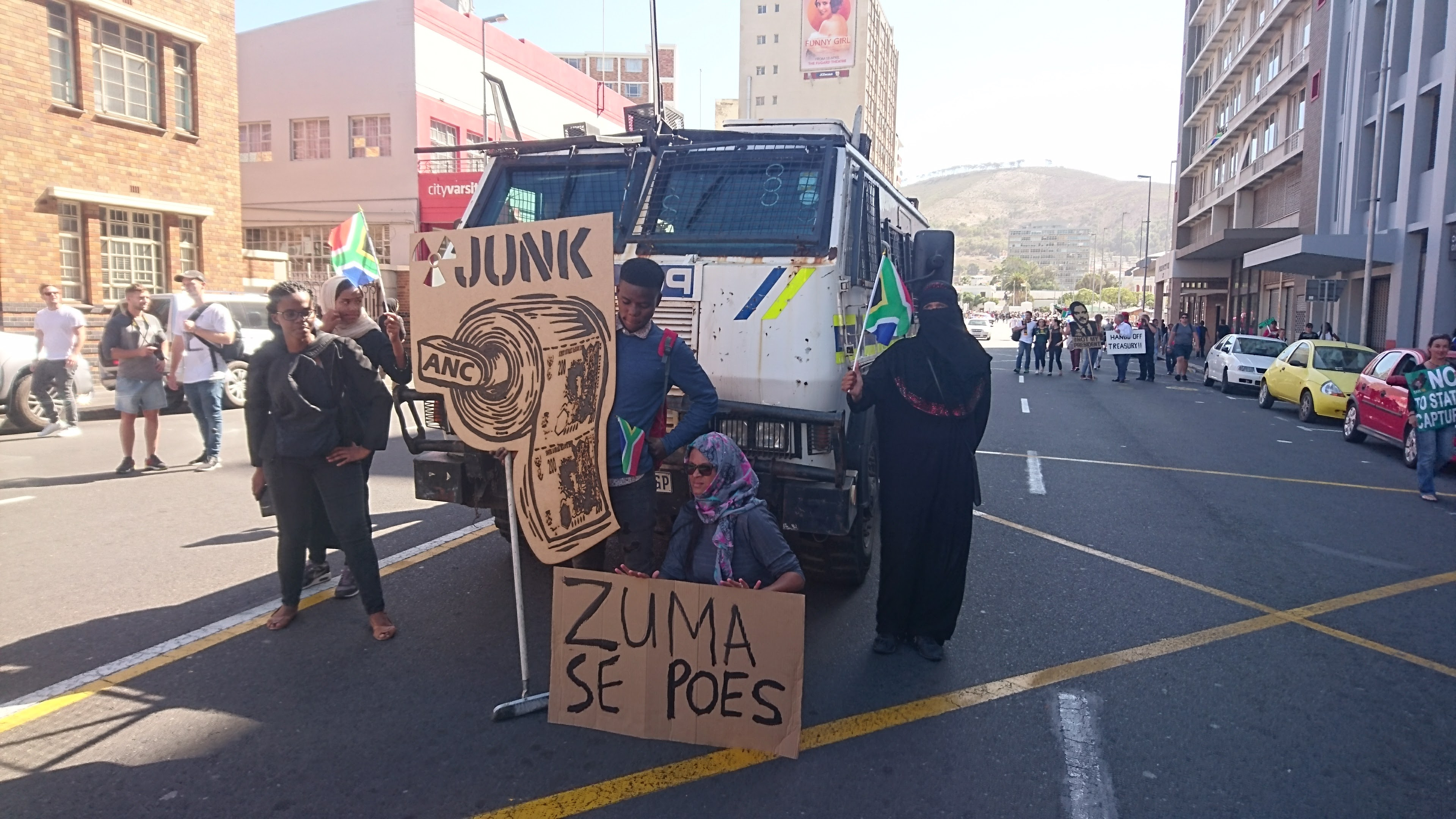
Insulting posters at the Zuma Must Fall protest in Cape Town, 7 April 2017.

At the ANC's 54th National Conference in December 2017, Zuma was succeeded by his deputy, Ramaphosa, as ANC president. Thereafter, there was growing pressure on Zuma to resign from the national presidency. On 6 February 2018, Zuma's annual State of the Nation Address, scheduled for 8 February, was postponed indefinitely "to create room for establishing a much more conducive political atmosphere." The following week, Ramaphosa and Zuma spent almost five days in talks. On Monday 12 December, when it became clear that the negotiations had failed, the ANC National Executive Committee convened an emergency meeting near Pretoria, and, after nearly ten hours of debate, decided that Zuma should be "recalled" by the party if he did not resign voluntarily. Ramaphosa and another senior official reportedly drove to Zuma's home just after midnight to deliver the ultimatum, but Zuma refused, insisting on a three-month notice period or transition period before leaving office. On 13 December, the National Executive Committee publicly announced its intention to recall Zuma. As a party-political body, it formally lacked the authority to remove sitting presidents – but, if Zuma did not resign at its request, it could instruct the ANC caucus, which controlled Parliament, to remove him through a motion of no confidence. Indeed, the party planned to remove him in this way if he did not resign by midnight on Wednesday.

Wednesday 14 February began with a dawn police raid at the Johannesburg home of the Gupta family, which the Hawks said was related to an investigation into state capture. Mid-afternoon, Baleka Mbete, the Speaker of the National Assembly, announced that the EFF's motion of no confidence in Zuma had been moved forward in the parliamentary schedule, and that it would now be voted on the following day instead of on 22 February. She told journalists that "the recall, most definitely official, is now being implemented by this institution [Parliament]". The ANC announced that it planned to support the opposition's motion, which would ensure its passage. Shortly afterwards, Zuma gave a long live television interview on SABC, arguing that he had done nothing wrong and had not been given reasons for his recall. He said that he disagreed with the ANC's decision and was being "victimised". He also said that, if he was dismissed, the ANC could be "plunged in a crisis that I’m sure my comrade leaders will regret". According to a later report by City Press, during this period elements of the South African National Defence Force and State Security Agency were unsuccessfully lobbied to launch a revolt to prevent Zuma's removal.

On the same day, 14 February 2018, in a live televised address just before 11 p.m., Zuma announced his resignation with immediate effect. In his speech, he said that he accepted the ANC's decision, but had asked its leadership to "articulate my transgressions and the reason for its immediate instruction that I vacate office", given that he had earlier had an agreement with the party that if he resigned it would be after "a period of transition". He said:

Make no mistake, no leader should stay beyond the time determined by the people they serve... No life should be lost in my name and also the ANC should never be divided in my name... I have therefore come to the decision to resign as President of the Republic with immediate effect. Even though I disagree with the decision of the leadership of my organisation, I have always been a disciplined member of the ANC. As I leave I will continue to serve the people of South Africa as well as the ANC, the organisation I have served all my life. I will dedicate all of my energy to work towards the attainment of the policies of our organisation, in particular the radical economic transformation agenda.
