= Protests in South Africa =

Escalations since 2004

South Africa has been dubbed "the protest capital of the world", with one of the highest rates of public protests in the world.

It is often argued that the rate of protests has been escalating since 2004, but Steven Friedman argues that the current wave of protests stretches back to the 1970s. The rate of protests "rose dramatically in the first eight months of 2012", and it was reported that there 540 protests in the province of Gauteng between 1 April and 10 May 2013. In February 2014 it was reported that there had been "nearly 3,000 protest actions in the last 90 days – more than 30 a day– involving more than a million people".

Since 2008, more than 2 million people have taken to the streets in protest every year. Njabulo Ndebele argued, "Widespread 'service delivery protests' may soon take on an organisational character that will start off as discrete formations and then coalesce into a full-blown movement". There has been considerable repression of popular protests. The most common reasons for protests are grievances around urban land and housing. It has been reported that "Nearly 75% of South Africans aged 20-29 did not vote in the 2011 [local government] elections" and that "South Africans in that age group were more likely to have taken part in violent street protests against the local ANC than to have voted for the ruling party".

In September 2013 the police reported that they had "made more than 14,000 arrests at protests in the past four years".

According to The Times "Informal settlements have been at the forefront of service delivery protests as residents demand houses and basic services".

== Escalation of popular protests ==
During the 2004–05 financial year, about 6,000 protests were officially recorded, an unknown number of protests went unrecorded, and about 1,000 protests were illegally banned. This meant that at least 15 protests were taking place each day in South Africa at this time. However the number of protests has escalated dramatically since then and Business Day reports that "2009 and 2010 together account for about two-thirds of all protests since 2004". There was a dramatic surge in protests shortly after Jacob Zuma first took office and the number of protests was ten times higher in 2009 than in 2004 and even higher in 2010. The number of protests reached an all-time high in 2010–2011 and then a further all time post-apartheid peak in July 2012 with more protests occurring in the Western Cape than in any other province and just under half of all protests occurring in shack settlements. In early 2013 it was reported that popular protest had reached its highest rate since the end of apartheid in 1994. In early 2013 it was argued that there have been as many as 3,000 protests in the last four years.

Between 1997 and 2013 most protests were related to labour issues or crime and were only very rarely disorderly. In 2013 the overall number of protests decreased but the rate of disorderly protests increase dramatically. Notable South African journalist Phillip de Wet estimated that nine out of eleven protests were peaceful.

In the first five months of 2018 a total of 144 service delivery protests were recorded with the Eastern Cape, followed by Gauteng and the Western Cape provinces having the most protests.

== Rebellion of the Poor/Municipal Revolts/Ring of Fire ==
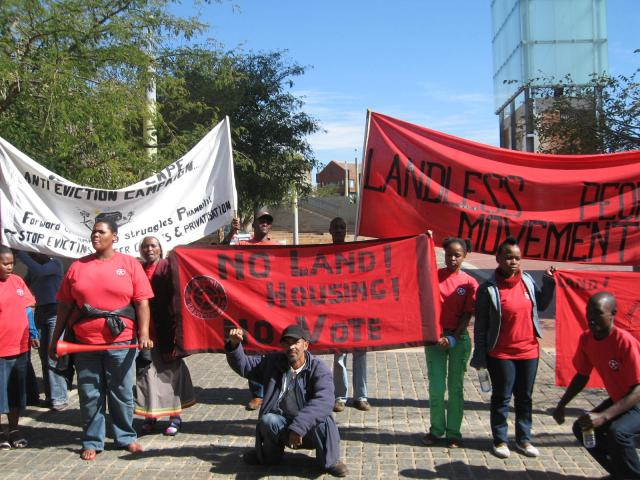
No Land! No House! No Vote! protest in 2009

There has been a major wave of popular protests since 2004. Just under 40% of all protests take place in shack settlements. There has been a significant degree of repression of popular protests.

These protests are usually referred to as "service delivery protests" in the media but although there is evidence of growing unhappiness with service delivery, most analysts argue that this description is overly narrow and misleading. A number of poor people's movements have insisted that their protests should not be referred to as "service delivery protests". But others have termed the rapidly increasing wave of protests since 2004 as a "rebellion of the poor" or a series of "municipal revolts". Zwelinzima Vavi, COSATU Secretary General, has described the increasing rate of popular protests as a "ring of fire" closing in on major cities that could result in a Tunisia-style revolution.

Some of the most notable protests during this period occurred in Harrismith, Kennedy Road, Durban, Diepsloot, Balfour, Thokoza, Khutsong, Macassar Village, Lansdowne Road and Mandela Park in Khayelitsha, KwaZakhele, downtown Durban, Masiphumelele, Ermelo, Grahamstown and Thembelihle (Lenasia).

Protests continue and some analysts take the view that protests are becoming increasingly radical. Some commentators have concluded that "a large majority of South Africans feel that conventional mechanisms of engaging the state are failing, and that alternatives may be more effective".

According to Professor Peter Alexander: "As many commentators and activists now accept, service delivery protests are part of a broader Rebellion of the Poor. This rebellion is massive. I have not yet found any other country where there is a similar level of ongoing urban unrest. South Africa can reasonably be described as the 'protest capital of the world'."

A number of community organisations and movements have emerged from this wave of protests, some of which organise outside party politics. However, in most cases this wave of protest has not led to sustained organisation.

== Protest by trade unions ==
The national trade union federation, COSATU, has also organised a number of large protests, most notably against labour broking and highway tolls.

== Protest by workers organised outside trade unions ==
The 2012 Marikana miner strike, organised outside the ruling tripartite alliance, resulted in 34 strikers being killed by the police with 78 being wounded on 16 August 2012.

== Curtailment of the right to protest ==
It has been argued that the state is actively seeking to curtail the right to protest.

== Notable protests ==
- The Harrismith protests in 2004
- The Kennedy Road road blockade on 19 March 2005
- The Khutsong protests during 2006 and 2007
- The N2 Gateway occupations where over 1,000 families occupied unfinished state built houses to protest unfair and corrupt allocation of houses during 2007 and 2008
- The February 2008 Symphony Way road occupation which lasted over 1 year and 9 months
- The Balfour protest of 2009
- The Macassar Village Land Occupation in May 2009
- The Durban proletarian shopping protest in July 2009
- The Abahlali baseMjondolo march on Jacob Zuma in March 2010. City Manager Mike Sutcliffe tried to ban the shackdwellers from occupying the CBD
- The protests in Ermelo, Grahamstown, Zandspruit Ficksburg, Makhaza in Khayelitsha, the Samora Machel squatter camp in Mitchell's Plain, Cape Town, Shaka's Kraal in KwaZulu-Natal, Noordgesig, Soweto and Themb'elihle, Johannesburg, all in 2011.
- Protests in the Siyahlala shack settlement in Gugulethu, Cape Town, the Zakheleni and Puntan's Hill shack settlements in Durban, as well as Marrianridge, also in Durban, Oliphantshoek in the Northern Cape and Port Elizabeth in 2012
- The 2012 Marikana miner strike
- Protests on grape farms in the Western Cape in November 2012 and January 2013
- Protests in Sasolburg against municipal demarcation and the perceived corruption and manipulation of democratic processes in the local and regional ANC in January 2013
- Protests in Protea South, Soweto, in August 2013
- Abahlali baseMjondolo march on the Durban municipality, 15 September 2013
- Protests in Bekkersdal, Roodepoort and Bronkhorstspruit in early 2014 and Klipspruit, Soweto, and Langa, Cape Town, in mid-2014.
- The FeesMustFall student protests in 2015 and 2016 which called for free education.
- Protests in Zandspruit in March 2016
- Protests in Westbury, Johannesburg, in September–October 2018 following the death of a bystander caught in crossfire between gangs.
- 2019 service delivery protests that occurred across the country in the month before the 2019 general election held in May of that year.
- 2021 Jacob Zuma Protests, A series of protests regarding the arrest of ex-president Jacob Zuma
- 2022 Fuel Protests, A national shutdown regarding the high price of fuel in South Africa

== Notable post-apartheid protest campaigns ==
- The Treatment Action Campaign's largely successful struggle for access to AIDS medication
- Operation Khanyisa, protest against electricity disconnection led by the Soweto Electricity Crisis Committee. (The name was later used by ESKOM for a campaign against "electricity theft")
- The No Land! No House! No Vote! campaign is a popular nationwide protest movement of the Poor People's Alliance boycotting electoral politics.
- The Abahlali baseMjondolo campaign against the Slums Act
- The Right2Know Campaign is an umbrella organisation tackling secrecy legislation, as well as denials of access to information, and access to process
- The COSATU led campaign against labour brokering and electronic road tolls in Gauteng
- The 2012 Marikana miner strike
- The Western Cape 2012 Farm Workers' Strike

=== Zuma Must Fall campaign ===
From 7 April until 10 April 2017, large crowds protested against President Jacob Zuma's recent cabinet shuffle and the subsequent ratings agencies downgrade to junk status. The Zuma Must Fall campaign, whose organisers included members of the DA, EFF, African People's Convention and United Democratic Movement planned further demonstrations in the days leading up to Zuma's birthday. 50,000 South Africans, many of whom were black, expressed their anger at corruption within the ANC government, unfair trade deals by the government that favoured the powerful Gupta family, and economic problems that had resulted in the downgrading of South Africa's credit rating. More demonstrations occurred from 12 April onwards, with Julius Malema addressing the crowd in Pretoria before they marched on the Union buildings.

== Reasons for protests ==
Research has consistently shown urban land and housing to be the most common reasons for protest. However, there are multiple reasons for protest including:

- Unequal and segregated distribution of land in both rural and urban areas
- The demand for housing
- Poor service delivery (especially with regard to water and sanitation)
- Government corruption (especially at the local level)
- Undemocratic structure of wards and development forums
- Top down selection for party positions within the ANC
- Top down and authoritarian approaches to governance (or a lack of consultation)
- Evictions and forced removals
- Rampant crime
- Unemployment
- Police brutality
- Municipal and Provincial border demarcation issues
- Increases in transport prices
- Electricity disconnections, increases in electricity prices and the failure to provide electricity to shack settlements
- Over crowding in schools
- Failure to install traffic calming measures on roads adjacent to shack settlements
- Low wages

== Tactics ==
The toyi-toyi originally a Zimbabwean dance, has been used for decades in South Africa as a protest tool. Road blockades, land occupations, the mass appropriation of food and vote strikes are also common tactics. A choreography of dance performing a call and response song, protest performance, is a tactic that is often used to beckon bystanders to a march or demonstration

== Popular protests and elections ==
In areas with high rates of popular protests residents tend to boycott elections, to support independent candidates or to support parties other than the ANC.

== Misuse of the criminal justice system to intimidate grassroots activists ==
It has been argued that the criminal justice system has been misused to intimidate grassroots activists.

== Violence ==
=== Violence from the state ===
A number of people have been killed by the police in these protests over the years including Andries Tatane. The number of deaths of protestors after apartheid is currently standing at fifty four. Four people were killed by the police during protests between 2000 and 2004, two in 2006, one in 2008, two in 2009, three in 2010 and eleven in 2011.

There have also been constant allegations of non-fatal police brutality against protestors. It has been argued that people organizing independently of the ruling African National Congress are more likely to face state repression.

The worst incidence of police violence in post-apartheid South Africa was the Marikana Massacre in August 2012 in which 34 striking miners were killed and 78 were injured. One pistol was recovered from the strikers after the massacre.

=== Violence from protesters ===
Violence on the part of protesters, including attacks on ward councilors and their homes, has been escalating. In two years nine houses belonging to ward councillors in Gauteng were burnt down.

== See also ==
- Anyone but Zuma
- Zuma Must Fall campaign
- Political repression in post-apartheid South Africa
- Abahlali baseMjondolo
- The Anti-Privatisation Forum
- The Landless Peoples Movement
- The Marikana miners' strike
- The Mandela Park Backyarders
- The Poor People's Alliance
- Sikhula Sonke
- The South African Unemployed Peoples' Movement
- The Western Cape Anti-Eviction Campaign
- The Western Cape 2012 Farm Workers' Strike

== Other resources ==
- Service Delivery Protest Map (with media resources), Durham University
