= Nkandla homestead =

Private residence of former South African president Jacob Zuma

KwaDakwadunuse (Homestead)
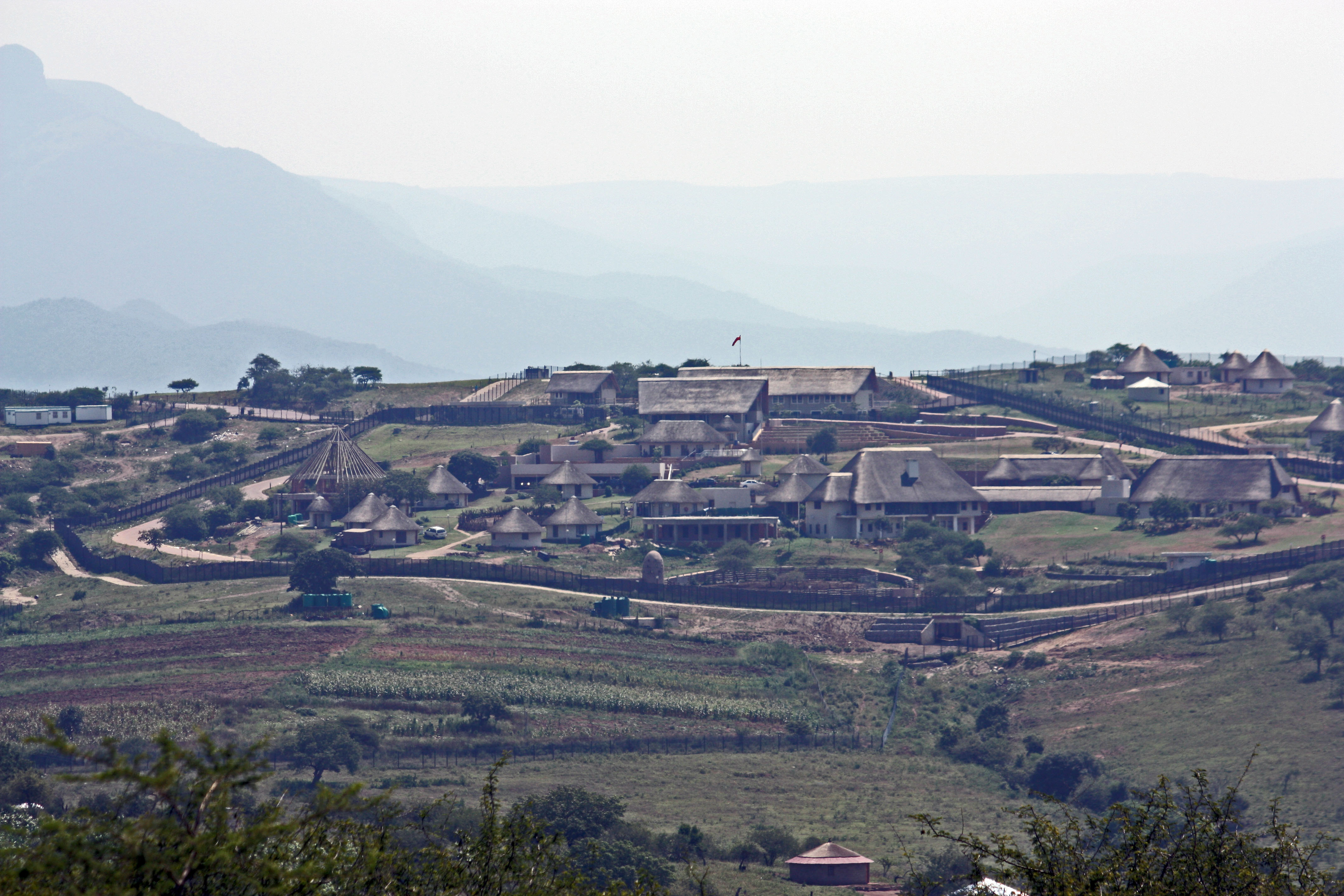

- Location within South Africa

General information
- Architectural style: Rondavel architecture
- Location: Nxamalala Farm, Nkandla, KwaZulu-Natal, South Africa
- Coordinates: 28.843968°S 31.099414°E
- Construction started: 29 August 2009
- Cost: ZAR R 246 631 303

Technical details
- Size: 3.83 ha (9.5 acres)

Design and construction
- Architect: Minenhle Makhanya at Minenhle Makhanya Architects
- Main contractor: CA du Toit (Security consultant); Ibhongo Consulting (Structural and Civil engineering); Igoda Projects (Pty) Ltd (Electrical engineering); R&G Consultants (Quantity surveying); Minenhle Makhaya Architects (Architect and principal agent); Mustapha & Cachalia CC (Mechanical engineering); Ramcon (Project management)

The private residence of former South African President Jacob Zuma is situated about 24 km (15 mi) south of the rural town of Nkandla in KwaZulu-Natal and is commonly referred to as the Nkandla homestead. During Zuma's presidency, the homestead was the subject of a major public controversy, sometimes referred to as Nkandlagate, concerning what were ostensibly security upgrades to Zuma's compound, at a cost of over R246 million. The use of public funds to make these improvements (including a controversial firepool) received significant media coverage and political opposition.

A report of the Public Protector found that Zuma unduly benefited from these improvements and the Constitutional Court subsequently found that Zuma's non-compliance with the report constituted a violation of the country's Constitution. Zuma ultimately apologised for using public money to improve his private residence and in April 2016 he was asked to resign by prominent public figures, including anti-apartheid activist Ahmed Kathrada, due to the scandal. In line with the Constitutional Court's judgement, Zuma repaid the state for the non-security upgrades – priced at R7.81 million by the National Treasury – in September 2016.

== Property and upgrades ==
The compound is situated on Nxamalala Farm in the rural region of Nkandla, KwaZulu-Natal, where President Jacob Zuma was born and raised. The land is owned by the Ingonyama Trust, which, through Zulu King Misuzulu kaZwelithini, administers KwaZulu-Natal's traditional lands on behalf of the state for the benefit of its occupants. Zuma's property comprises 3.83 hectares.

In 2008, according to Zuma, Zuma's family undertook a private construction project, using personal funds, to improve the homestead and build three new houses. In May 2009, pursuant to the 2009 general election, Zuma was elected President of South Africa, and – in terms of a Cabinet policy instituted under Zuma's predecessor – a process immediately began to assess and improve security measures at the President's private residences.

As part of this process, the South African Department of Public Works & Infrastructure (DPWI) built a helipad, underground bunkers, security and their accommodation, a firepool, a chicken-run, and fencing around the entire complex. According to the ministerial handbook, the department can spend R100,000 on security improvements at the private houses of public officials. Any costs above that must be covered by the official. Over R200,000,000 has appeared to be allocated by the department. The controversial firepool that was built is described as being part of "questionable security renovations".

In January 2024, at an address in Barberton, Mpumalanga, ahead of the ANC's birthday celebrations ANC Secretary General Fikile Mbalula admitted that ANC MPs lied "in defence of our president [Zuma], we went to Parliament and opened an ad hoc committee and said a swimming pool is a fire pool.”

Statements by spokesmen have mentioned an apartheid-era law, the National Key Points Act, as explanation for the spending discrepancy, but that spending should come from a different department. The leaked documentation also hints at vastly inflated prices for the work done, much of it not going out to tender, and huge consulting fees.

== Nkandlagate ==
The initial story was uncovered by the Mail & Guardian journalists Mandy Rossouw and Chris Roper. During that period, it was reported that the expansion to the compound would cost R65 million, paid for by the taxpayer. Expansion to the compound included the installation of a helipad, visitors' center, private military hospital and parking lot. The Mail & Guardian's investigative unit, amaBhungane, uncovered that the initial phase would include building a double-storey house and a guest house at a projected cost of over R19.4 million. As soon as the story broke out, government denied having a hand in the upgrades. The DPWI spokesperson contradicted initial statements by the government, "there is no work or extension project taking place at President Jacob Zuma's compound at Nkandla." During the site visit at the compound by the journalists, a contractor working at the site speculated that the costs of the expansion were likely to later increase.

== Public Protector's findings ==
=== Investigation ===
By October 2012, the Public Protector, Thuli Madonsela, was preparing to investigate the security upgrades, pursuant to various formal complaints lodged with her office in response to media reports. The first complaint had been lodged by a member of the public on 13 December 2011, and subsequent complaints were lodged by legal academic Pierre de Vos, Lindiwe Mazibuko of the opposition Democratic Alliance (DA), and three other members of the public. The investigation was conducted in terms of section 182 of the Constitution and sections 6 and 7 of the Public Protector Act – which outline and regulate the investigatory powers of the Public Protector – and, insofar as complaints alleged that Zuma had violated the Executive Ethics Code, also in terms of the Executive Members' Ethics Act.

==== Ministerial litigation ====
On 1 November 2013, Madonsela shared the provisional draft of her report with Cabinet's security cluster, which included the Ministries of State Security, Police, and Defence, and which was viewed as dominated by Zuma loyalists. On 8 November, the cluster brought an urgent interdict against Madonsela in the Pretoria High Court, seeking to prevent the release of the provisional report. The ministers requested more time to review and respond to the provisional report, and also claimed that they had not been given a fair hearing during the investigation. The Minister of Public Works and Infrastructure joined their application. Madonsela said that the case was part of a series of state attempts to obstruct her investigation.

In mid-November, however, the ministers withdrew the application, saying that the delay occasioned by the court process had already given them the extra time they needed to study the report. Nevertheless, they suggested that they might return to court to challenge the report on grounds publicly argued by Police Minister Nathi Mthethwa: that it was the security cluster ministers, not the Public Protector, who had the authority to decide what was classified as a threat to the president and the state (and therefore to decide the reasonable limits of upgrades for security purposes).

==== Delays ====
On 13 January 2013 the Public Protector informed the President that she would be unable to conclude her report within the prescribed 30 day period. Section 3(2) of the Executive Members' Ethics Act states that: "if the Public Protector reports at the end of the 30 day period that the investigation has not been completed, the Public Protector must submit a report when the investigation has been completed". The President then suggested to the Public Protector that she had failed to comply with the 30 day period and to report that the investigation was ongoing and whether the process was justifiable. The President and his lawyers tried to negate the validity of the investigation by requiring the Public Protector to indicate whether the President had the power to condone any non-compliance. There is no provision in the Constitution that authorises the President to condone any action or omission of the Public Protector.

=== Findings ===
A provisional draft of Madonsela's report, under the working title "Opulence on a Grand Scale," was leaked to the Mail & Guardian in late November 2013. The title came from the text of one public complaint, which Madonsela reproduced in the report:

"Like all South Africans I have recently read in the media the appalling story of the sums of taxpayers’ money being spent on the private residence of President Jacob Zuma. This is opulence on a grand scale and as an honest, loyal, taxpaying South African I need to understand how this is allowed to happen. Strangely civil society is quiet. This is wrong and highlights the complete disregard which this Government has for the citizens of this country. Where is this money coming from and how has it been approved?"

The report said that the cost of the upgrades had escalated to R215 million, with a further R31 million in works outstanding, and that, contrary to the government's claims, many of the state-funded improvements had exceeded Zuma's security needs as president. These included a swimming pool (officially a firepool), cattle kraal, marquee area, and new houses for relatives. It recommended that Zuma should repay the state, and added that Zuma had violated the government's code of ethics on two counts: failing to protect state resources, and misleading Parliament by telling it in November 2012 that the buildings and rooms had been "built by ourselves as family and not by government". Madonsela's final report, titled "Secure in Comfort," was released on 19 March 2014, shortly before Zuma's reelection, and mirrored the provisional report in its substantive aspects. In both the provisional and the final report, Madonsela found that Zuma had benefited unduly from the R246 million the state had spent on the upgrades.

=== Ministerial Handbook ===
In her investigation, Madonsela said that the Ministerial Handbook had a maximum security spending of R100 000 should The Minister of Public Works issue approval. Since the house at Nkandla is privately owned by the President, he would only be granted R100 000 for security measures. Therefore, the President would have acted in violation of the Ministerial Handbook.

== Political fallout ==
Police prevented Helen Zille from approaching the compound on 4 November 2012, she intended "to see what a R250-million renovation with public money looks like." She was referring to the security upgrades of R246 million which is multiple times larger than security upgrades to previous presidents' homes. Zuma's spokesperson Mac Maharaj said the opposition party adopted a "cowboy style" approach to getting the answers it wanted, and questioned Zille's use of the word "compound" to describe the homestead.

COSATU, a member of the governing tri-partite alliance, asked for the overpricing to be reviewed.

Shortly after the publication of Madonsela's report, the DA sent a bulk text message to Gauteng voters ahead of the 2014 general election which reads: "The Nkandla report shows how Zuma stole your money to build his R246m home. Vote DA on 7 May to beat corruption. Together for change." The ANC submitted an urgent application to the South Gauteng High Court to stop distribution of the text message on the grounds that it violated the Electoral Act. On 4 April 2014, the court ruled that the wording of the message was fair comment and dismissed the ANC's application with costs. The ANC was granted leave to appeal the decision. On 6 May 2014, the Electoral Court ruled that the DA must retract the text message, finding that it wrongly targeted Zuma personally instead of the systematic failures highlighted in Madonsela's report. The court case was ultimately won by the DA when the Constitutional Court set aside the Electoral Court ruling on 19 January 2015.

== Parliament ==
On 19 December 2013, public works minister Thulas Nxesi presented a report of an inter-ministerial task team which justified the public expenditure and cleared Zuma. On 28 April 2014, a parliamentary ad hoc committee set up to consider Zuma's response to Madonsela's report was referred to the next Parliament to be formed after the 2014 general election, citing insufficient time available before the 7 May election date. As of 11 August 2014, a Special Investigating Unit (SIU) mandated to investigate the matter by Zuma in December 2013 is suing the architect for R155.3 million in the KwaZulu-Natal High Court. On 12 September 2014, the SIU's report on their investigation was tabled in Parliament. The SIU said that the Zuma family was enriched by the upgrades and blamed overspending on the architect and public works officials, who have alleged interference by Zuma and others who have all denied these allegations. The SIU also found that security measures were still inadequate despite the overspending.

A second parliamentary ad hoc committee, established in August 2014, would consider the report of the inter-ministerial task team published in December 2013, the Public Protectors' final report published in March 2014 and the SIU's report published in September 2014, as well as Zuma's responses to them. The second ad hoc committee challenged the findings of the Public Protector and referred the matter to security experts including the police minister in November 2014.

On 28 May 2015, police minister Nkosinathi Nhleko, who was appointed by Zuma on 25 May 2014, released his report on Nkandla which found that the swimming pool, cattle kraal, chicken run, visitor's centre and amphitheatre were needed security features and concluded that Zuma does not owe the South African taxpayers anything. On 18 August 2015, the National Assembly adopted the report of a third parliamentary ad hoc committee which accepted the findings of Nxesi and Nhleko and cleared Zuma. Opposition parties Economic Freedom Fighters and Democratic Alliance subsequently approached the Constitutional Court to enforce the Public Protector's findings.

== Constitutional Court judgement ==
On 31 March 2016, the Constitutional Court delivered a unanimous ruling stating that the Public Protector's report was binding and Zuma and the National Assembly failed to uphold the country's constitution. The court ordered the National Treasury to determine the amount that Zuma must pay back and ordered Zuma to do so within 45 days of the court's approval of the National Treasury report.

== Repayment ==
As instructed by the Constitutional Court, the National Treasury instituted an investigation – required to be completed within 60 days of the judgement – to "determine a reasonable percentage of the costs... which ought to be paid personally by the President". The investigation was conducted by a six-member panel comprising representatives of two professional quantity surveying firms, two professional engineering firms, the South African Institution of Civil Engineering, and the Association of Quantity Surveyors. The panel considered the five main upgrade components – the amphitheatre, cattle kraal, chicken run, visitors' centre, and swimming pool – and found that:

- Only the control centre on the ground floor of the visitors' centre could be reasonably considered to constitute a security upgrade;
- The reasonable cost of the five items amounted to R8.88 million as of June 2009 and R11.75 million as of May 2016, including VAT; and
- Zuma should be personally liable for 87.94% of the costs, corresponding to R7,814,155 as of June 2009.

The R7.81 million figure included R2.3 million for the swimming pool, R1 million for the amphitheatre, and R1.2 million for the cattle kraal. Treasury submitted its report to the Constitutional Court, which approved the recommendation in late July 2016. Complying with the Court's directive that the amount should be paid within 45 days of its approval by the Court, Zuma repaid the full amount in September 2016. However, he financed the repayment using a R7.8 million loan from VBS Mutual Bank, and allegedly defaulted on his repayments of the bond in August 2018. In August 2022, the Pietermaritzburg High Court granted VBS an order forcing Zuma to pay back the bond. The property itself could not be attached to the bond as collateral because the land is not owned by Zuma personally.

In August 2026, the special tribunal ordered Minenhle Makhanya, a former architect and principal agent responsible for Nkandla upgrades, to pay R147.2 million to the National Treasury.

== See also ==
- National Key Points Act, 1980 § Nkandla homestead
- 2014 South African general election § Controversies
