= Zandspruit =

- Location within Gauteng Location within South Africa
- Coordinates: 26.059°S 27.909°E
- Country: South Africa
- Province: Gauteng
- Municipality: City of Johannesburg

Area
  - Total: 1.00 km^{2} (0.39 sq mi)

Population (2011)
  - Total: 31,716
  - Density: 31,700/km^{2} (82,100/sq mi)

Racial makeup (2011)
  - Black African: 99.1%
  - Coloured: 0.5%
  - Indian/Asian: 0.1%
  - White: 0.1%
  - Other: 0.2%

First languages (2011)
  - Northern Sotho: 16.7%
  - Zulu: 14.4%
  - Venda: 13.2%
  - Tswana: 11.3%
  - Other: 44.5%
- Time zone: UTC+2 (SAST)
- PO box: 1747

Zandspruit is a township in the Region C of the City of Johannesburg Metropolitan Municipality in the Gauteng province of South Africa. It has been the scene of potential opportunities with regard to development by private and public entities. Several complaints against apathy and incompetence on the part of the local municipal authority have been raised and as a result development has slowly occurred.

Over the years the place has seen development in various areas. Life quality has improved due to efforts by the members of the community. And this has resulted in teenagers collaborating to establish an online community based radio, active sports teams and cultural and extra curricular opportunities for primary children.

Several members and students have received the opportunity to improve their lives through the concentrated effort of the community on encouraging the importance of self education and entrepreneurship.

== See also ==
Notable protests in South Africa
