= Western Cape 2012 Farm Workers' strike =

Wave of strikes and protests

The Western Cape 2012 Farm Workers' strike was a wave of strikes and protests by agricultural workers in the Western Cape from 27 August 2012 to 22 January 2013. The events led to the deaths of 3 workers, R160 million in damages as well as a 52% increase in the official minimum wage. The protests mostly took place the towns of De Doorns and Worcester with smaller protests in Ceres, Robertson, Grabouw, Wolseley and Villiersdorp. The main cause of the strikes was low worker pay of R69 (roughly US$8.54 in 2012) per day and high unemployment.

== Initial protests in 2012 ==
The protests began on a farm near De Doorns on 27 August 2012 when a group of largely female workers walked off the job. It then spread to other areas. It has been described as 'organic' and organised by workers without mediation by political parties, trade unions or NGOs. The strike was finally called off on 4 December 2012.

According to the Mail & Guardian "the fact that the protests spread so fast after decades of quiescence shocked the country." It has been suggested that the strike was, in part, inspired by the Marikana miners' strike which took place earlier in the year.

Three protesters were killed during the strike amidst widespread claims of police brutality and intimidation of workers to join the strikes.

=== Forms of protest ===
The strike mostly included road blockades, stoning of police, and burning vineyards but also included the intimidation of non-striking workers and damage to property (both agricultural as well as urban). The police reported that shops were also looted.

=== Violence ===
A 28-year-old man, Michael Daniels, was shot dead by the police on 14 November 2012. A 40-year-old man, Bongile Ndleni, was shot dead, allegedly by a private security firm, on 17 November 2012. Amongst other reports of police violence it has been reported that a ten-year-old girl was shot in the face with a rubber bullet by the police. A police officer was injured and hospitalised by protesters when they stoned a police station. On Elim farm, near De Doorns, a pensioner, Jan Jonkers, was attacked by a protester with a machete fracturing his skull after he was mistaken for a non-striking worker.

The provincial premier Helen Zille had stones thrown at her and her delegation when they tried to address a crowd of 2,000 protesters in De Doorns forcing her, although unharmed, to leave the area.

== Role of COSATU ==
On 14 November COSATU announced that the strike was suspended but workers continued with their strike. The next day, most farmworkers remained on strike. This led to a split between the Food and Allied Workers Union (FAWU), which is affiliated with COSATU, and the leadership of COSATU in the Western Cape with the former opting to support the farmworkers in defying COSATU's agreement with government. According to the Daily Maverick, Cosatu did not have a democratic mandate to call off the strike on 4 December 2010.

== Resumption of the Strike in 2013 ==
The strike was resumed in January 2013. It was, again, accompanied by considerable violence by and spreading to the towns of Villiersdrop and Wolseley.

The Daily Maverick reported that Nosey Pieterse, the president of the Black Association of the Wine and Spirit Industry and general secretary of Bawusa, the Bawsi Agricultural Workers Union of South Africa, played an important role in the strike in January 2013. However others have argued that the strike was largely self organised and that leaders were largely self-proclaimed. Letsekang Tokhwane, 25, was shot dead by the police on 14 January 2013. The strike was finally called off on 22 January 2013. A number of workers were fired as a result of their participation in the strike.

== Impact ==
The strikes had an imitate impact on the daily minimum wage for agricultural workers being raised from R69 (roughly US$8.54 in 2012) per day to R105 (US$13 in 2012) per day. The event was also used as a regional campaign issue in the run up to the South African general election of 2014. Attempts to resume the strike one year later in November 2013 where unsuccessful due to a reported lack of interest by workers and well as disagreement over the necessity of striking again. The Western Cape's premier and member of the Democratic Alliance (DA), Helen Zille, stated that she believed there was a political motive for the strike with the African National Congress stoking unrest in the province to present the DA run province as "exploitative, racist and ungovernable".

== See also ==
- Protest in South Africa
