= Mandy Rossouw =

South African journalist, political analyst and author (died 2013)

- Born: Kleinzee, Cape Province, South Africa
- Died: 11 March 2013 (aged 33); Bryanston, Johannesburg, Gauteng, South Africa
- Education: Paarl Gimnasium
- Alma mater: Stellenbosch University
- Occupation: Journalist

Mandy Rossouw (died 11 March 2013) was a South African journalist, political analyst and author. She worked in a variety of positions, including as an international correspondent for Media24 and the deputy politics editor at Mail & Guardian. Rossouw was also known for breaking the Nkandlagate story.

== Early life ==
Rossouw was born in Kleinzee in the Namaqualand to Cornell and Wilha Rossouw. She had two twin sisters, Megan and Melanie. Her family later moved to Paarl and Rossouw attended Paarl Gimnasium. After high school, she went on to study at Stellenbosch University where she graduated with a Bachelor of Arts (BA) and later with a Honours degree in Journalism.

== Career ==
During her student days, Rossouw was a member of the editorial team of Die Matie student newspaper. She started her career as a political journalist for Beeld, an Afrikaans-language newspaper in Johannesburg, reporting on Parliament and the Gauteng Provincial Legislature. In 2006, she became the foreign correspondent for the Media24 group and moved from Johannesburg to London in the United Kingdom. The following year, Rossouw began working as the Mail and Guardian's deputy political editor, a position she would hold for four years until 2011, when she rejoined the Media24 group. She also worked as a political journalist for City Press, Eyewitness News and Die Burger. She was a Clive Menell fellow at Duke University in the United States and a guest lecturer in politics and journalism at a few universities in South Africa.

While at Mail & Guardian, Rossouw and fellow journalist Chris Roper broke the initial story on president Jacob Zuma's private home, known as the Nkandla homestead, which would later become the subject of considerable controversy.

Rossouw co-authored The World According to Julius Malema with veteran journalist Max du Preez. She also co-authored The Year in Quotes 2010 and Come again? Quotes from the Famous, the Infamous and the Ordinary with journalist Andrew Donaldson. In 2012, she published Mangaung: Kings and Kingmakers, a guide to the ANC's national elective conference that year.

== Death ==
Rossouw died from an aortic aneurysm on 11 March 2013 in her flat in Bryanston, Johannesburg. A friend had discovered her body. She was 33 years old. After her death, the Government, the National Union of Metalworkers of South Africa, Rhodes University, veteran journalist Ferial Haffajee all released statements, in which they paid tribute to Rossouw.

== Legacy ==
In October 2013, Stellenbosch University launched the Mandy Rossouw Scholarship. The scholarship is awarded to a female student who has been selected for the graduate degree in Journalism at Stellenbosch.

== Published works ==
- Du Preez, Max, Rossouw, Mandy (2009). The World According to Julius Malema. NB Publishers. ISBN 9780795702921
- Donaldson, Andrew, Rossouw, Mandy (2011). The Year in Quotes: 2010. NB Publishers. ISBN 9780795703041
- Donaldson, Andrew, Rossouw, Mandy (2011). Come Again?: Quotes from the Famous, the Infamous and the Ordinary. Kwela. ISBN 9780795703355
- Rossouw, Mandy (2012). Mangaung: Kings and Kingmakers. Kwela. ISBN 9780795704529
