= 2019 service delivery protests =

South African protest

- Date: 3 April 2019 – May 2019
- Location: Urban areas of South Africa
- Caused by: Lack of delivery of municipal services
- Methods: Looting; Civil disobedience; Demonstrations
- Result: 2 deaths; 45 total arrests; 37 arrests in the Western Cape; 8 arrested in Soweto; property damage

The 2019 service delivery protests refers to a series of protests and civil disturbances taking place across urban areas of South Africa related to poor service delivery that started in Alexandra on 3 April 2019.

After starting in Alexandra on 3 April the protestors marched to the wealthy nearby neighbourhood of Sandton five days later to gain more attention. On 9 April the trade union SAFTU stated their support for the protests and called on other areas in Gauteng province to join. By 11 April 2019 the protests had spread to other major cities in the rest of the country. Other than Alexandra protests occurred in Hammanskraal, Roodepoort, Vereeniging, Kroonstad, Blackheath, Tshwane, Bekkersdal, Orange Grove, Nomzamo Lingelethu East, Bergville, Bekkersdal, Caledon, Eersteriver, Rus-ter-Vaal, Khayelitsha, Riverlea, and Soweto.

The major political parties traded accusations over the cause of the riots. The African National Congress (ANC) accused the Democratic Alliance (DA) of not effectively delivering services to the protesting communities and the DA made a counter accusation that it was ANC governance in Johannesburg two years before was the root cause of poor service delivery in Alexandra. The protests were openly supported by the trade union SAFTU who called on other areas to join the protests. The DA and Economic Freedom Fighters (EFF) accused the ANC of instigating and spreading the protests to discredit them in the run up to the 2019 South African general election.

Notable South African academic Steven Friedman, criticised media coverage of the protests for "denigrat[ing] poor people by offering a distorted picture of their lives" and supporting politically motivated narratives that the protests were incited by political parties instead of being driven by genuine grievances.

== See also ==
- 2019 South African general election
