= Nkandla compound firepool controversy =

Political controversy in South Africa

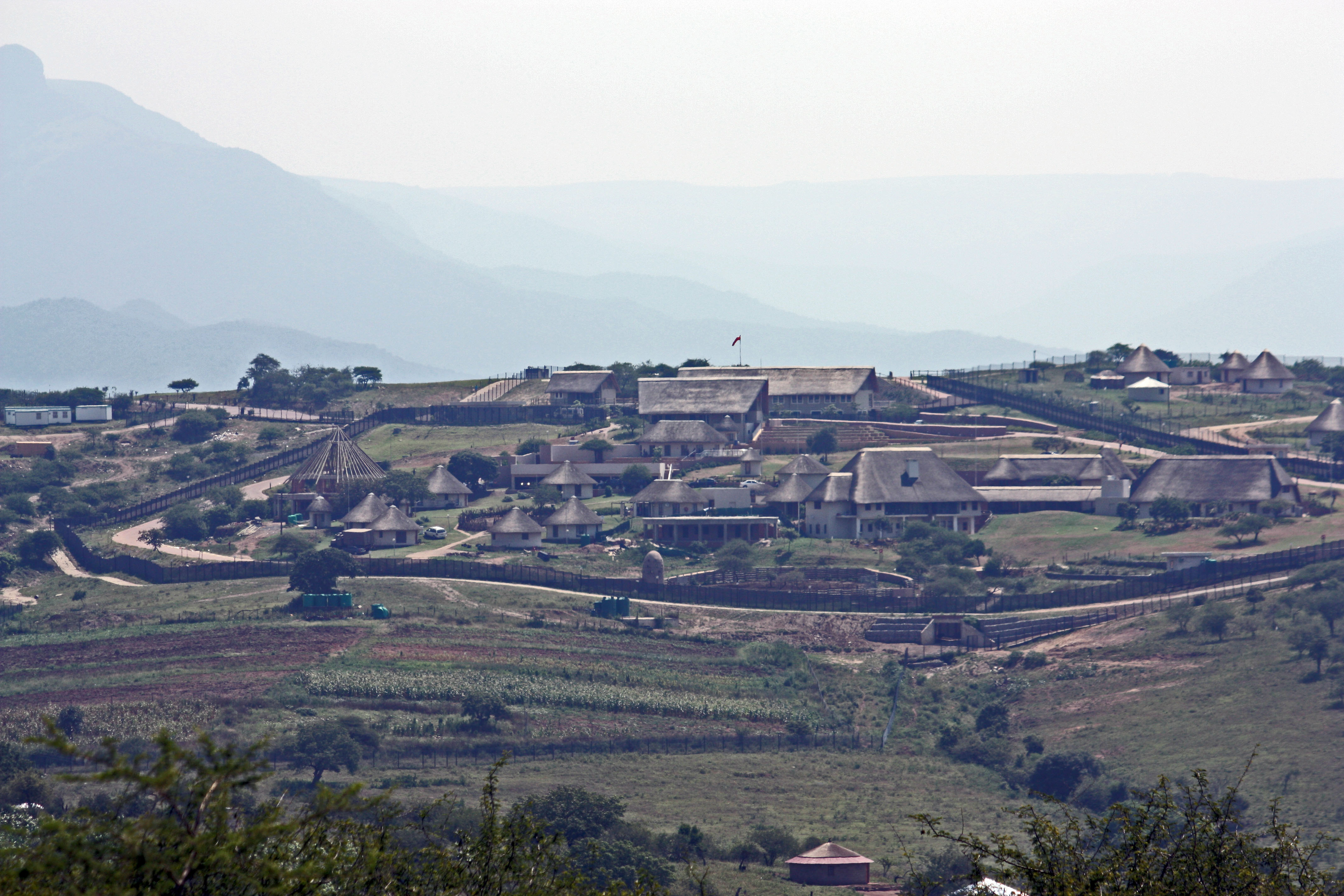
The Nkandla compound in South Africa

At former South African President Jacob Zuma's Nkandla compound and private residence in South Africa, a swimming pool officially deemed to have a dual purpose as a "firepool" was constructed. It was claimed that the pool was built as a security feature and security upgrade, as a source of water for firefighting. A controversy surrounded the construction of the pool.

Official South African documents refer to the pool as a "fire pool", with the rationale that the pool can also serve as a water reservoir for firefighting. However, press reports that the "fire pool" resembles a normal swimming pool led to media outlets scrutinizing the controversial pool construction as a part of "questionable security renovations".

The public response regarding the fire pool was "public condemnation", accusations of corruption and cronyism, plus the posting of sarcastic tweets on Twitter about the situation. In a report titled "Secure in Comfort", Public Protector Thuli Madonsela concluded that Zuma should repay some of the improvements costs, having "benefited unduly" from them. However, Nkosinathi Nhleko, South Africa's Police Minister, said that Zuma was not liable for any reimbursements.

On 31 March 2016 the Constitutional Court ruled that President Zuma violated the constitution when he failed to repay government money spent on his private home and it gave the treasury 60 days to determine how much he should repay. On 1 April 2016 Zuma said "I respect the judgement and will abide by it".

In January 2024, at an address in Barberton, Mpumalanga, ahead of the ANC's 112th birthday celebrations ANC Secretary General Fikile Mbalula admitted that ANC MPs lied "in defence of our president [Zuma], we went to Parliament and opened an ad hoc committee and said a swimming pool is a fire pool.”

== Cost ==
The pool at the Nkandla compound was built for slightly over R 3.9 million, which was a part of several improvements at the Nkandla compound to improve security that totaled around $23 million.

Comparatively, construction of the same-sized pool has been given a sales quote of R 1.3 million for the pool itself, and a quote of R 1.8 million "with all the extras", which was provided from an anonymous pool builder based in Cape Town. The total cost of the pool has been a point of contention among South African citizens and news media outlets.

== Effectiveness for firefighting ==
Tests conducted by South African firefighters found the pool's use as a firepool to be a more suitable water source for firefighting compared to a fire hydrant. The water pressure was tested, and it was concluded that the pool was best for firefighting because water suction from the pool was stronger compared to that from fire hydrants. It was also stated that the water supply to Nkandla is inconsistent, with low pressure, and "often runs out." A video was published demonstrating evidence to these claims.

== See also ==
- National Key Points Act, 1980 § Nkandla homestead
