= Anyone but Zuma =

2012 South African political campaign

- Campaign: Internal ANC leadership race
- Affiliation: African National Congress
- Status: Defunct
- Headquarters: Luthuli House, Johannesburg, South Africa
- Key people: Cyril Ramaphosa, Mathews Phosa, Makhosi Khoza, Jackson Mthembu, Pravin Gordhan, Julius Malema, Fikile Mbalula
- Slogan: "Anyone but Zuma"

Anyone but Zuma (ABZ) was a South African factional political campaign within the African National Congress (ANC) to oppose the presidency of Jacob Zuma. The campaign wanted anyone to lead the ANC and not Zuma, citing widespread corruption and was also used to oppose his re-election at the party's 2012 national conference where he was vying for a second term as ANC president; and again in the 2017 conference where he unsuccessfully supported his ex-wife Nkosazana Dlamini-Zuma to succeed him.

The campaign was also used to block the lame duck Zuma from delivering the State of the Nation Address in 2018.

== Origins ==
The term first emerged ahead of the ANC’s 53rd National Conference in Mangaung in 2012 and led by an anti-Zuma faction within the ANC that rallied behind then Deputy President Kgalema Motlanthe to unseat Zuma, labeling themselves as part of the "Anyone But Zuma" camp. However, Zuma won the conference by a large margin, getting 2,983 votes against Motlanthe's 991 votes.

The ABZ campaign returned with force in 2017 when Zuma endorsed Nkosazana Dlamini-Zuma as his successor at the 54th National Conference. Reformist members of the ANC supported his deputy Cyril Ramaphosa who won by 2,440 votes against Dlamini-Zuma's 2,261 votes.

== Key figures of ABC ==
Although never formally constituted, the ABZ initiative symbolized internal dissent within the ANC, rooted in concerns over corruption, governance and the integrity of party leadership.

The principal figure challenging Zuma was then Deputy President Kgalema Motlanthe, who accepted nomination for the position of ANC President. Motlanthe, however, refused to campaign openly, a decision that many critics argued weakened the ABZ bloc’s effectiveness. Other key figures aligned to or sympathetic with the ABZ campaign included:

- Tokyo Sexwale – Then Minister of Human Settlements, who ran for the position of Deputy President and was publicly critical of Zuma’s leadership.
- Mathews Phosa – Outgoing ANC Treasurer-General, who also contested for Deputy President and advocated for ethical leadership within the party.
- Zwelinzima Vavi – Then General Secretary of COSATU, who, while not a candidate, was a vocal critic of President Zuma and his administration.
- Fikile Mbalula - A senior ANC member who was opposed to Zuma and contested on Motlanthe's slate as secretary-general.
- Julius Malema – Former President of the ANC Youth League, expelled earlier in 2012, but influential in shaping the anti-Zuma discourse among young activists.
- Loyalists of former President Thabo Mbeki, who maintained a critical stance toward Zuma’s leadership from within certain provincial and alliance structures.

Despite significant backing from reformist and dissenting elements within the party, the ABZ campaign failed to unseat Zuma. At Mangaung, Zuma was re-elected ANC President with 2,983 votes to Motlanthe’s 991.

Political analysts attributed the campaign’s failure to the lack of a unified leadership strategy, Motlanthe’s low-profile approach, and Zuma’s dominance over ANC provincial structures and branches. The election also saw Cyril Ramaphosa entering the leadership race as Zuma’s running mate, effectively neutralizing moderate opposition within the party.

== See also ==
- African National Congress
- Cyril Ramaphosa
- Nkosazana Dlamini-Zuma
- Zuma Must Fall campaign
