= Zuma Must Fall campaign =

Civic protest movement and slogan that emerged in South Africa

Zuma Must Fall was a civic protest movement and slogan that emerged in South Africa in 2015 as a popular expression of opposition to then-President Jacob Zuma. The campaign gained momentum following Zuma’s controversial dismissal of Finance Minister Nhlanhla Nene in December 2015, which led to a dramatic decline in the South African rand and widespread economic instability. Although it was not affiliated with any single political party, the campaign brought together diverse civil society groups, opposition political parties and ordinary South Africans calling for Zuma’s resignation.

== Background ==
The hashtag #ZumaMustFall was inspired by earlier protest movements in South Africa, notably #FeesMustFall, which mobilized against increases in university tuition. Even before that, #RhodesMustFall had gained momentum as a campaign to remove the statue of British imperialist Cecil Rhodes from the University of Cape Town’s grounds.

Jacob Zuma, who served as President of South Africa from 2009 to 2018, was frequently criticized for corruption scandals, alleged abuse of state institutions, and what became known as "State capture" - a term used to describe the undue influence of private interests over government decisions. Public frustration had been mounting throughout his presidency, but the firing of Nhlanhla Nene as finance minister (replaced with Des van Rooyen) became a tipping point. Nene’s dismissal triggered an immediate negative reaction from markets, leading to a significant drop in the value of the rand and billions of rands in losses to the national economy. Zuma’s decision was viewed by many as reckless and damaging to the country's financial credibility.

=== Protests ===
The first major demonstration under the "Zuma Must Fall" banner occurred on 16 December 2015 (Day of Reconciliation), with thousands gathering in cities such as Cape Town, Johannesburg, Pretoria, and Durban. Participants came from across the political spectrum, including opposition parties like the Democratic Alliance (DA), United Democratic Movement (UDM), Congress of the People (Cope) and Economic Freedom Fighters (EFF) as well as civil society organizations, trade unions and unaffiliated citizens.

The protests were largely peaceful and characterized by slogans, posters and T-shirts bearing the phrase "Zuma Must Fall." The campaign also trended widely on social media platforms such as Twitter (now X) and Facebook, with hashtags like #ZumaMustFall and #SaveSouthAfrica gaining popularity.

== Criticism and controversy ==
While the movement garnered significant support, it also faced criticism. Some ANC supporters and commentators argued that the campaign was co-opted by external regime change forces with a political agenda. Others claimed it was led by racist rich whites, thus reflecting racial and class tensions in post-apartheid South Africa aimed at undermining the black majority government, particularly after a "Zuma Must Fall" billboard was erected on a luxury building in central Cape Town amid accusations by City Council officials that it was illegally erected at R500 000. Also a ZumaMustFall website was created overnight, calling for his recall.

Zuma himself dismissed the campaign, insisting that he remained accountable to the ANC and not public protests.

== See also ==
- State capture
- Anyone but Zuma
- Gupta family
- Fees Must Fall
