= Phillip de Wet =

Phillip de Wet is a British-South African journalist, editor, and columnist.

He is the former foreign editor of News24, where he publishes a weekly column on world events.

He is the author of Nkandla: The Great Unravelling and Write Risky: How to write for impact in the age of AI.

De Wet was the founding deputy editor of daily online newspaper Daily Maverick, which credited him with much of its initial personality. He was also a founder of that website's defunct predecessor magazine, Maverick.

In October 2015, he was appointing as acting deputy editor of newspaper Mail & Guardian. Five years earlier that newspaper had described him as a "journalism school dropout".

In February 2018, De Wet was appointed as associated editor of Business Insider South Africa.

He remained at Media24, the publisher of Business Insider South Africa, first as a writer at large for News24 (website) and then its foreign editor, until January 2025.

In September 2025, De Wet joined UK technology publication The Stack as an associate editor.

In May 2026, he launched the website Signal & State.

In June 2026, he published the book Write Risky.

In September 2026, he left journalism to join AI startup PAIR.

== Controversial articles and columns ==
In February 2017, police sought to question De Wet about the leak of a draft government report he had written about.

In October 2017, De Wet won a major national award for the column “Rainbowism comes to wine gums — and the black ones get a ghetto”, which was judged as "creatively refreshing by tracking the history of wine gums as a means to address central issues of South Africa’s past and future."

In February 2020, Burger King in South Africa published a print advert in the form of a coupon offering a free hamburger to anyone who shared De Wet's name, in response to an article he wrote questioning the brand's future in that country. The move drew national attention and advertising company Saatchi & Saatchi South Africa cited it as a case study. De Wet asked readers to send him the coupons in their newspapers by physical mail, then cashed them in for 1,020 free hamburgers for a non-profit organisation which cares for vulnerable girl children in Johannesburg.

In January 2025, De Wet called on South Africa to make political preparations to exercise its "digital sovereignty" by banning Facebook if necessary. His friend, former colleague, and fellow columnist Ivo Vegter diagnosed him with "an acute case of authoritarianism" in response.

In July 2026, De Wet compared UK politician Nigel Farage with the corruption-accused former South African president Jacob Zuma.
