= 2009 South African presidential election =

- 6 May 2009

400 votes in the National Assembly 201 votes needed to win
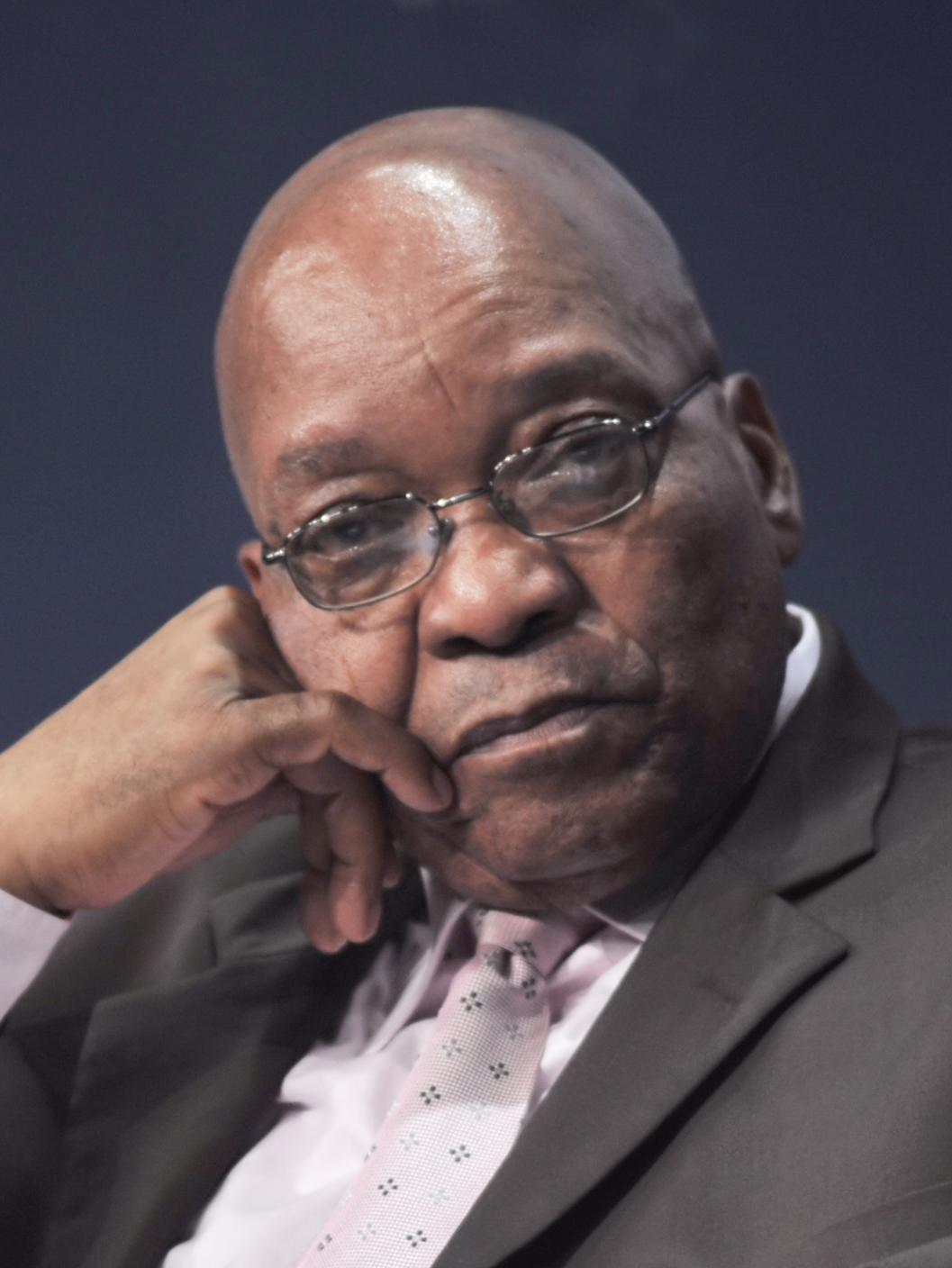

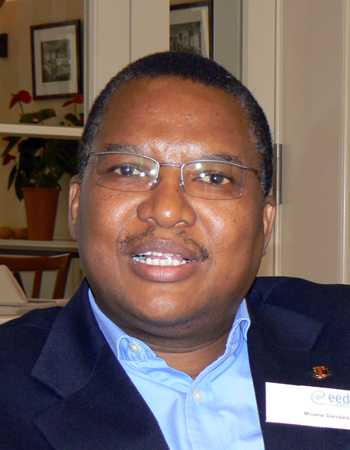
Nominee	Jacob Zuma	Mvume Dandala
Party	ANC	COPE
Electoral vote	277	47
Percentage	85.5%	14.5%
President before election
Kgalema Motlanthe
ANC
Elected President
Jacob Zuma
ANC

An indirect presidential election was held in South Africa on 6 May 2009 following the general election on 22 April 2009. Jacob Zuma of the ruling African National Congress won the election with 277 votes (13 more than the number of seats held by the ANC), while Mvume Dandala of the Congress of the People got 47 votes. The 67 members of the official opposition Democratic Alliance abstained from voting.
