= Busi Mavuso =

South African businesswoman

- Born: 1977 or 1978 (age 48–49); Soweto, South Africa
- Education: University of South Africa
- Years active: 1995–present
- Organization: Business Leadership South Africa

Busisiwe Mavuso (born 1977 or 1978) is a South African businesswoman and the chief executive officer of Business Leadership South Africa. Before her appointment to that position in July 2019, she was the chief executive officer of the Black Management Forum between 2016 and 2017.

== Early life and education ==
Mavuso was born in 1977 or 1978 in Soweto, where she grew up in the White City neighbourhood of Jabavu. She and her three siblings were raised by their mother, a widowed teacher who died in 2012. In 1994, at the age of 16, Mavuso matriculated at Lofentse Girls School in Orlando East.

Although her family circumstances meant that she was forced to enter the workforce immediately after matriculation, she also enrolled part-time in the University of South Africa, intending to become a chartered accountant. She completed her Bachelor's degree in accounting several years later and then completed a Master's in business leadership at the same university. In 2018, she qualified as a member of the Association of Chartered Certified Accountants.

== Early corporate career ==
Mavuso entered banking in 1995; her first job was an internship at Allied Bank. She went on to work in various consulting, telecommunications, and healthcare companies.

In 2009, she became the chief financial officer of the Black Management Forum; she ultimately spent eight years at the Forum, rising to become managing director. Upon her appointment as managing director in 2016, she professed herself in favour of strict and punitive enforcement of transformation targets in South African companies.

== Business Leadership South Africa ==
In November 2017, she was appointed as the chief operating officer of Business Leadership South Africa (BLSA), working under her mentor, Bonang Mohale, who had recently been appointed as BLSA CEO. She succeeded Mohale as CEO on 1 July 2019.

Simultaneously, between 2018 and 2022, Mavuso was a member of the board of Eskom; she was appointed to her seat in January 2018, when the board was chaired by Jabu Mabuza. In April 2022, she made national headlines for walking out of a meeting between the board and Parliament's Standing Committee on Public Accounts. When Mavuso told the Committee that the board and André de Ruyter would not accept being made "the fall guy for this ANC-led government" and its "mess" (the ongoing energy crisis), Committee chairperson Mkhuleko Hlengwa told Mavuso to "Either behave yourself or excuse yourself from this meeting" and she promptly excused herself. The Ministry of Public Enterprises called Mavuso's conduct "unbecoming", but Mavuso maintained that she had no obligation to "behave and be pliable to Parliament". She resigned from the Eskom board in September 2022.

Mavuso also was on the board of Business Unity South Africa. Her weekly newsletter, serialised in several newspapers, has a wide readership in South Africa.

== Personal life ==
As of 2016, Mavuso had two young children. She lives in Johannesburg.
