= Business Leadership South Africa =

South African trade association

- Nickname: BLSA
- Formation: 1959; 67 years ago
- Founder: Harry Oppenheimer
- Type: Business lobbying
- Headquarters: Sandton, Gauteng, South Africa
- Region served: South Africa
- Chairperson: Nonkululeko Nyembezi
- CEO: Busi Mavuso
- Affiliations: Business Unity South Africa
- Website: blsa.org.za
- Formerly called: South Africa Foundation

Business Leadership South Africa (BLSA) is an independent trade association that represents the interests of numerous major corporations in South Africa. Members include a variety of large South African companies, as well as some multinational corporations with a significant presence in South Africa.

Founded in 1959 as the South African Foundation, it rebranded as BLSA in November 2005. The organization's stated mission is to facilitate effective dialogue with government, civil society, and labour.

== History ==
=== South Africa Foundation ===
The South Africa Foundation was founded in 1959, amid substantial political unrest in apartheid South Africa. Founded by Anglo American mogul Harry Oppenheimer, its primary purpose was to improve South Africa's global reputation and reassure the international community of the safety of South African investments. Although it accommodated a large corporate membership in the 1980s, it ultimately settled on a membership of the country's fifty largest corporations. Political scientist Scott D. Taylor later described it as the "executive committee of the bourgeoisie".

The foundation served abroad, in the New York Times's description, as "an independent source of information about South Africa as well as a sort of ad hoc chamber of commerce for the country"; in this respect, it was bolstered by a dedicated office in Washington D.C. and by Anglo American's global network of subsidiaries. However, the South Africa Foundation also promoted itself as a pressure group that lobbied the apartheid government to undertake progressive reforms. Representatives of the foundation met with leaders of the anti-apartheid African National Congress (ANC) in London in January 1985.

After the end of apartheid in 1994, the South Africa Foundation was critical of the post-apartheid government's macroeconomic and labour policy, publishing a critique of the Reconstruction and Development Programme under the title Growth for All in February 1996. During the same period, the foundation came under sustained attack from Ronald Suresh Roberts, who accused it of having been "actively committed to pro-apartheid culture". In the Mail & Guardian and in the book Reconciliation Through Truth, which he co-authored with Kader Asmal, Roberts argued that the foundation's propaganda efforts had served the apartheid regime; in particular, he pointed to a 1967 advertisement in the Sunday Times in which the foundation had argued that South Africans should stop apologising for apartheid and should instead adopt "a tone of confident self-assertion which publicised the opportunities of apartheid".

=== Rebranding as BLSA ===
On 25 November 2005, the South Africa Foundation rebranded as Business Leadership South Africa (BLSA), under the mission statement, "Making South Africa Good for Enterprise and Making Enterprise Good for South Africa". Alongside Business Unity South Africa, of which it is an affiliate, BLSA became one of the two leading business forums in South Africa.

=== Response to state capture ===
During the presidency of Jacob Zuma, South Africa was wracked by allegations of state capture, which intensified after Zuma fired Finance Minister Nhlanhla Nene in a controversial cabinet reshuffle in December 2015. BLSA's tepid response to the reshuffle was roundly criticised in the press. In the aftermath, BLSA took up a more activist stance towards Zuma's government. In October 2016, through the so-called CEO Initiative, the association pledged its support for Nene's successor, Minister Pravin Gordhan. In August 2017, it launched the #BusinessBelieves campaign, which it said would aim to reverse the reputational damage that business had suffered as a result of Bell Pottinger's "white monopoly capital" campaign. BLSA's campaign included the adoption by all members of an "integrity pledge" promising zero tolerance for corruption.

In September 2017, amid mounting allegations that certain member companies had been involved in state capture, BLSA temporarily suspended the membership of Eskom, Transnet, and KPMG. Bain & Company was suspended a year later, during the Nugent Commission hearings into Bain's consultancy work at the South African Revenue Service. It withdrew entirely in January 2022, after further evidence was published by the Zondo Commission, and the South African National Treasury banned Bain & Company from tendering any public sector contracts for 10 years. Consequentially, Bain exited the South African market in 2025.

== Membership ==
The association's membership is limited to "major South African corporations", as defined by the board. Members include the executives of multinational corporations with a significant presence in South Africa, as well as corporations based in South Africa; and represented industries include financial services, mining, legal services, management consulting, telecommunications, and brewing. As of May 2026, BLSA's members were:

- Absa
- Alexander Forbes
- Allan Gray
- Amazon
- Anglo American
- Anglo American Platinum
- AngloGold Ashanti
- BDO
- Bidvest
- Bowmans
- BP
- British American Tobacco (BAT)
- Capitec
- Citi
- Clientèle
- Coronation
- Deloitte
- Deutsche Bank
- Discovery
- Distell
- ENSafrica
- EOH
- Exxaro
- EY
- FirstRand
- Gold Fields
- Goldman Sachs
- Hollard
- Investec
- Isuzu
- JPMorgan Chase
- JSE
- KPMG
- Kumba Iron Ore
- Liberty
- Momentum Metropolitan
- Mondi
- MTN
- MultiChoice
- Naspers
- Nedbank
- Nestlé
- Old Mutual
- OUTsurance
- PwC
- Remgro
- South African Breweries
- Sanlam
- Sappi
- Sasol
- Sea Harvest
- Sibanye Stillwater
- Siemens
- South32
- Standard Bank
- Telkom
- TFG
- TotalEnergies
- Unilever
- Vodacom
- Volkswagen
- Webber Wentzel
- Woolworths

== Leadership ==
The following individuals have nbeen chief executive officer since BLSA was relaunched in 2005:

- Michael Spicer (2005–2011)
- Thero Setiloane (2011–2016)
- Bonang Mohale (2017–2019)
- Busi Mavuso (2019–present)

Past chairpersons include Bobby Godsell and Jabu Mabuza, and Saki Macozoma had a lengthy tenure as the association's president.
