= Debt-trap diplomacy =

Diplomatic practice coercing alignment or access of an indebted country to its creditor

Debt-trap diplomacy is an international financial relationship where a creditor country or institution extends debt to a borrowing nation partially, or solely, to increase the lender's political leverage. The creditor country is said to extend excessive credit to a debtor country with the intention of extracting economic or political concessions when the debtor country becomes unable to meet its repayment obligations. The conditions of the loans are often not publicized. The borrowed money commonly pays for contractors and materials sourced from the creditor country.

A neologism, the term was first coined by Indian academic Brahma Chellaney in 2017 to contend that the Chinese government lends and then leverages the debt burden of smaller countries for geopolitical ends. Many academics, professionals, and think tanks have rejected the hypothesis, concluding that China's lending practices are not behind the debt troubles faced by borrowing nations, and that Chinese banks have never seized an asset from any nation, and are willing to restructure the terms of existing loans.

== Origin and background ==
Due to the 2008 financial crisis, central banks in the U.S. and Europe lowered interest rates, leading to low interest rates in private markets in those countries throughout the 2010s. This made those markets less attractive to investors, who turned more towards countries with emerging or frontier markets in pursuit of higher returns. In 2013, China, which was less affected by the 2008 crisis than the U.S. and Europe, started its Belt and Road Initiative (BRI), making loans available through its policy banks and other state-linked firms for infrastructure projects primarily in the same sorts of emerging markets that private investors were focusing on. This led to China becoming the world's largest bilateral lender. As the decade progressed, many countries with low-income governments ran into debt distress in the wake of earlier large-scale borrowing, with the IMF estimating in 2019 that over 40% of such countries were in debt distress or at high risk of it.

It was in this context that Indian analyst Brahma Chellaney published his 2017 article "China's Debt-Trap Diplomacy", where he is widely credited with having coined the term. He claimed that China's BRI belied predatory geostrategic motives on the part of its government, aiming "not to support the local economy" in countries that took on loans through it, but "to facilitate Chinese access to natural resources, or to open the market for low-cost and shoddy Chinese goods." He further asserted that when these countries ran into debt distress, "it [was] even better for China," allowing China to pressure these countries into taking out more loans through it, ceding control of state assets to it, or aligning their foreign policy with it, in exchange for debt relief.

This hypothesis attracted wide interest, being covered in prominent newspapers like The Guardian and The New York Times and reiterated in foreign policy analyses by other academics, and inspiring anxiety in the governments of the U.S. and its allies. The U.S. administration publicly endorsed the hypothesis; Rex Tillerson, then the U.S. Secretary of State, decried China for "using opaque contracts, predatory loan practices and corrupt deals that mire nations in debt and undercut their sovereignty, denying them the long-term, self-sustaining growth," in a May 2018 speech aimed at African governments before starting an official tour there. Google returned around 2 million results for "debt-trap diplomacy" by November.

Chellaney's hypothesis became the subject of controversy with academics, journalists, and financial analysts publishing rebuttals. By 2023, according to the Associated Press, a consensus had formed among experts that Chinese lending to foreign governments was "far too haphazard and sloppy to be coordinated from the top," coming from "dozens of banks on the mainland" without signs of any overarching geostrategic plan. The debt crises among low- and middle-income countries that had been growing in the late 2010s only worsened in the early 2020s with the COVID-19 pandemic and rising commodity prices due to the Russian invasion of Ukraine, but although many of these countries did owe large sums of money to Chinese banks, many had also borrowed heavily from private investors and organizations like the IMF and World Bank, and China did not appear to be in a good position to benefit from many of these crises.

Chinese lending to other developing countries is predicated on the view that time and continued financing can solve debt problems that arise. The underlying assumption is that development generated through debt for industrial projects or infrastructure projects will lead to urbanization and industrial development that raises fiscal revenue and land revenue for public borrowers, allowing them to repay loans in the long run.

Chinese policy banks have lent domestically to local governments in China on the same basis since the 1990s. Its policy banks provided local governments with loans that were excessive on the basis of their fiscal capacity. By collateralizing local governments' land and fiscal revenues, local governments were empowered to borrow large amounts to capitalize industry and infrastructure projects.

== Assessments ==
=== Media outlets ===
Western, Indian, and African media outlets have criticized the terms of Chinese state loans and their high interest rates. One example was a 2006 loan to Tonga to rebuild infrastructure. In 2013 and 2014, Tonga experienced a debt crisis when the Exim Bank of China (its creditor) did not write them off. The loans cost 44 percent of Tonga's gross domestic product (GDP). According to some analysts, such practices highlight China's hegemonic intentions and its challenges to state sovereignty.

In March 2022, Bloomberg News reported that despite China making the Western world uncomfortable with its large infrastructure projects in Africa, a deeper look into the evidence showed that the accusations towards China of doing debt-trap diplomacy in the continent, were "unfounded". The Economist investigation found that China, although a big lender, accounted for fewer shares of loans compared to the World Bank and commercial loans. No evidence of predatory lending practices was found.

The Associated Press reported, in May 2023, that a dozen countries, including Pakistan, Kenya, Zambia, Laos and Mongolia, were on the "brink of collapse" under the weight of overwhelming foreign debt, "much of [it] from the world’s biggest and most unforgiving government lender, China." However, the analysts quoted in the article disputed the idea that this was in line with any grand geostrategic plan of China's, saying that there is "no single person in charge" of the lending as it comes from "dozens of banks on the mainland" and "is far too haphazard and sloppy to be coordinated from the top." Rather, they surmised that Chinese banks were reluctant to forgive or restructure foreign debt because of difficult economic conditions domestically.

=== Governments ===
In August 2018, a bipartisan group of 16 U.S. senators accused China of engaging in debt-trap diplomacy. In an October 2018 speech, U.S. Secretary of State Mike Pompeo said that China's loans are facilitated with bribes. According to senior U.S. government officials, Beijing "encourages dependency using opaque contracts [...] that mire nations in debt and undercut their sovereignty".

In 2021, the Trinidad and Tobago government defended its decision to accept a multi-million dollar loan from China rather than from the IMF by saying that (unlike the IMF) Beijing was not demanding any "stringent conditions" for its loans. Minister of Finance Colm Imbert said at a news conference,

The Chinese loan has a very attractive interest rate of two per cent. The IMF is 1.05 per cent, so there isn't much to choose between them. If you’re making a judgement call ... one loan, no structural adjustment, you don't have to retrench people, you don't have to de-value your currency, etc. etc. ... and then another ... you have to do all kinds of terrible things ... That's a no-brainer, obviously you’d go with the one that doesn't have any structural adjustment conditionalities associated with it, especially since the interest rates are very close, just one percent apart.

=== Studies ===
A March 2018 report released by the Center for Global Development said that between 2001 and 2017, China restructured or waived loan payments for 51 debtor nations (most of the BRI's participants) without seizing state assets.

In September 2018, W. Gyude Moore, a former Liberian public works minister and senior policy fellow at the Center for Global Development, said, "The language of 'debt-trap diplomacy' resonates more in Western countries, especially the United States, and is rooted in anxiety about China's rise as a global power rather than in the reality of Africa." Moore stated in 2021 that "China has been a net positive partner with most African countries." Academic David M. Lampton writes China's lending to risky borrowers is not a plot and that in American political discourse it is easier to allege a strategy like "debt-trap diplomacy" than it is for Americans to accept that domestic politics often drive excesses in China just as they do in other countries.

An August 2018 China Africa Research Initiative report authored by Deborah Bräutigam, Janet Eom, and Lina Benabdallah said, "Chinese loans are not currently a major contributor to debt distress in Africa." According to the report, China was at the time "the most significant contributor to high risk of/actual debt distress" to three African countries: Zambia, Djibouti, and Congo.

In April 2019, the Rhodium Group said that China's leverage in debt was limited in power. According to a May 2019 Sydney Morning Herald article, accusations of "debt trap diplomacy" were being questioned by new research; an analysis of 40 Chinese debt re-negotiations by the Rhodium Group found "asset seizures are a very rare occurrence", and debt write-off is the most common outcome. The article also reported the views of Australian National University senior lecturer Darren Lim, who (referring to the Rhodium Group study) said that much of the leverage shifts to the borrower rather than the lender after the loan has been made. Lim also said that although the debt-trap diplomacy theory was never credible, the Trump administration embraced it. La Trobe University head of humanities and social sciences Nick Bisley said that China aimed to build political capital through the BRI, but asset seizures would not achieve that end.

An October 2019 report by the Lowy Institute said that China had not engaged in deliberate actions in the Pacific which justified accusations of debt-trap diplomacy (based on contemporaneous evidence), and China had not been the primary driver behind rising debt risks in the Pacific; the report expressed concern about the scale of the country's lending, however, and the institutional weakness of Pacific states which posed the risk of small states being overwhelmed by debt. A 2020 Lowy Institute article called Sri Lanka's Hambantota International Port an example of China debt-trap diplomacy, but called the narrative a "myth" because the project was proposed by former Sri Lankan president Mahinda Rajapaksa, not Beijing. The article added that Sri Lanka's debt distress was not caused by Chinese lending, but by "excessive borrowing on Western-dominated capital markets".

Deborah Bräutigam, a professor at Johns Hopkins University, described debt-trap diplomacy as a "meme" which became popular due to "human negativity bias" based on anxiety about the rise of China. According to a 2019 research paper by Bräutigam, most of the debtor countries voluntarily agreed to the loans and had positive experiences working with China and "the evidence so far, including the Sri Lankan case, shows that the drumbeat of alarm about Chinese banks' funding of infrastructure across the BRI and beyond is overblown ... a large number of people have favorable opinions of China as an economic model and consider China an attractive partner for their development." Bräutigam and Meg Rithmire said that the theory lacked evidence, and criticized the media for promoting a narrative that "wrongfully misrepresents the relationship between China and the developing countries that it deals with." According to their research, China had never actually seized an asset from any country.

In 2021, a study by AidData analyzed 100 contracts across 24 countries and found that "Chinese contracts contain unusual confidentiality clauses that bar borrowers from revealing the terms or even the existence of the debt", "Chinese lenders seek advantage over other creditors", and "cancellation. . . clauses in Chinese contracts potentially allow the lenders to influence debtors’ domestic and foreign policies." The study found that half of China's lending to developing countries was not reported in official statistics.

In June 2022, according to a report by researchers from Columbia University and the University of Oxford, "the debt-trap narrative is a function of China-US strategic and ideological rivalry rather than a reflection of African realities or perspectives." While China is Africa's biggest bilateral creditor, most of the African debt is held by private Western holders, specifically American and European investors. Chinese debt is not the most rapidly growing segment of debt, whereas African debt owned by investors from America and Europe is the fastest growing segment of African debt in the last few years. At the end of 2019, Africa's total debt was equal to US$964 billion and the total debt owed to Chinese entities was equal to US$78 billion, which is equal to about 8 per cent of the region's total debt. In response to US criticism, Chinese institutions made many goodwill gestures by postponing debt repayments worth roughly $750 million. The study said, “contrary to the debt-trap narrative, if a wave of African defaults materializes in the near future, as International Financial Institutions officials have been fearing since at least 2015, it will be catalyzed more by private-sector maneuvering and intransigence than by Chinese scheming."

In 2023, London School of Economics Professor Keyu Jin writes that the claim that China leads borrowers into a debt trap is misleading. Jin observes that the majority of BRI countries' debt is owed to international organizations or private Western institutions like hedge funds, rather than to China. Jin also writes that China has written off many of its loans and also provided debt relief to borrowers.

In April 2023, the Boston University Global Development Policy Center published a brief to analyze eight examples of "supposed debt trap diplomacy cases" by China, and concluded that debt trap diplomacy was not the driver of China’s overseas lending and development finance policies, and that they found no empirical evidence to prove that China had intended to lend with the aim of seizing a strategic state asset, or gaining a strategic leverage if a borrower was unable to repay the debts.

A research paper published in April 2023 in the Journal of the Indian Ocean Region sought to clarify whether or not debt-trap diplomacy existed. They were unable to find "Chinese intention to burden borrowing countries with debt in order to gain strategic assets in any case". The authors, Michal Himmer and Zdeněk Rod, did not detect an exchange of material assets or non-material assets for debt in the cases of Kenya, Malaysia, and the Maldives. In all analyzed cases, the governments of the borrowing countries actively sought out finances and loans out of personal and political considerations. Some of them directly asked for aid from China. While China often owns a significant portion of the state's debt, for example in Laos (40%) and Kenya (21%), constituting a real threat to the country, it does not prove the debt trap diplomacy narrative. No Chinese intention to obtain strategic assets was detected and only one debt-for-equity swap could be found concerning property in Laos. However, the circumstances behind the case are unclear. One problem with the debt trap diplomacy approach is the focus on the exchange of material assets for property but the study also took into consideration non-material assets. The study recommends revising the debt trap diplomacy approach to focus on the quantitative aspect of loans such as Chinese standards when it comes to loan policy and the finances of the borrowing countries.

Publishing in 2023, academic Austin Strange stated that scholars have challenged the narrative of a Chinese debt-trap and that analysis of BRI projects does not substantiate the debt-trap narrative.

Academics Yan Hairong and Barry Sautman stated in a 2024 study that the debt-trap narrative is incorrect, as China does not foreclose on borrower assets. Also writing in 2024, academic Jamie Linsley-Parrish said that the Chinese debt-trap hypothesis remains unfounded. Citing analyses of British colonial lending and IMF lending, Linsley-Parrish writes, "[T]o paint China as manipulative in its debt investment is at best misguided and at worst hypocritical."

Writing in 2024, academic Muyang Chen states that China's development financing for other countries is based on the same approach practiced in China's domestic lending to local governments since the 1990s. Chen writes that if this style of development finance is characterized as a debt-trap, then China would have been debt-trapping its own local governments for decades. Chen observes that collateralized lending was practiced by Western private banks to oil-rich African and Latin American countries before China used this approach.

A 2025 study by the Lowy Institute found that the developing world's debt repayments to China exceed those owed to Paris Club countries. The study states that there is little evidence that the purpose of the Belt and Road Initiative was debt trap diplomacy but "Chinese lending has been a driver of debt sustainability problems in many countries around the world." Regarding China and claims of debt-trap diplomacy, academic Zongyuan Zoe Liu stated that "the pervasiveness of this narrative shows the extent to which China’s opaque lending practices and the political leverage that appears to be built into its financing model have led to global unease."

According to academic Kevin P. Gallagher, "China is not the source of developing countries' debt crises, and there is no evidence of debt-trap diplomacy."

Writing in 2026, academics Min Ye and Jorge Heine stated that the idea of debt-trap diplomacy by China has been debunked.

== The IMF and the World Bank ==
Both the International Monetary Fund (IMF) and World Bank have been accused of predatory lending practices to keep emerging economies in debt, including: demanding structural adjustment programmes as a condition for loans, often to governments who see these loans as a last resort, pressuring for privatization and exerting undue influence over central banks. The founder of the activist network Committee for the Abolition of Illegitimate Debt wrote: "The World Bank and the IMF have systematically made loans to states as a means of influencing their policies." The IMF has used geopolitical considerations, rather than exclusively economic conditions, to decide which countries received loans.

In the book Confessions of an Economic Hit Man, whistle blower John Perkins wrote that international lenders, including the World Bank and the IMF, persuaded leaders of underdeveloped countries to accept loans for large development projects. Working as a consultant, Perkins was involved in misrepresenting the profitability of the development projects so that they appeared to be self-financing.

Academic Kevin P. Gallagher writes that of sixty-nine countries identified by the IMF and United Nations Development Programme as at or near debt distress, Western private sector bondholders and institutions like the World Bank constitute a greater share of their debt than loans from China.

Academic Jeremy Garlick cites IMF loans to South Korea during the 1997 Asian financial crisis as widely perceived by the South Korean public as a debt-trap. Garlick writes that the public was generally bitter about submitting to the conditions imposed by the IMF, which required South Korea to radically restructure its economy and consult with the IMF before making economic decisions until the debt was repaid. In his comparison of China's Belt and Road Initiative loans to IMF loans and Paris Club loans, which have not been very successful in reducing the debt of developing countries, Garlick stated that there is no reason to believe the BRI is worse for developing countries' debt than Western lending frameworks.

== Africa ==
Chinese loans to Africa
Year	$ (billions)
2005	2
2006	5
2007	6
2008	4
2009	6
2010	7
2011	10
2012	13
2013	18
2014	15
2015	13
2016	30

African countries rapidly increased their borrowing from China between 2000 and 2014 (totaling US$94.5 billion) as they sought to end their dependence on the IMF and World Bank, which demand market liberalisation in exchange for loans. Johanna Malm wrote that Chinese loans have been an alternative to IMF loans. IMF loans are lower-cost and financed by limited government income; Chinese loans are more expensive, but secured by high-revenue projects. China is a major project stakeholder in the economies of many African countries, significantly influencing the continent's affairs. According to 2015 and 2017 World Bank records, several African countries owe large debts to China and other creditor nations. Private-sector interest rates of about 55 percent prompted some African countries to go to China, which charges about 17 percent, for loans.

Despite criticism that Chinese firms emphasize Chinese labor, Chinese-funded infrastructure projects in Africa primarily employ African workers. A 2017 McKinsey report on Sino-African economic relations found that Africans made up 89 percent of labor on the projects surveyed, and job training and local workers were regularly included in contract negotiations between the Exim Bank of China and African countries.

According to research conducted as part of the Jubilee Debt Campaign in October 2018, African debt to China rose from $10 billion in 2010 to more than $30 billion in 2016. China loaned a total of $143 billion to African governments and state-owned enterprises between 2000 and 2017. In 2020, the African countries with the largest Chinese debt were Angola ($25 billion), Ethiopia ($13.5 billion), Zambia ($7.4 billion), the Republic of the Congo ($7.3 billion), and Sudan ($6.4 billion).

According to Deborah Bräutigam, Chinese loans are prone to misuse and have encouraged corruption and power struggles in African countries. She also published her findings in a 2020 article for Johns Hopkins’ China Africa Research Initiative, titled “Debt Relief with Chinese Characteristics". Her analysis investigated Chinese loans in Ethiopia, Angola and the Republic of Congo, and “found no ‘asset seizures’". They also found that Beijing cancelled at least $3.4 billion and had restructured or refinanced around $15 billion of debt in Africa between 2000 and 2019, and at least 26 individual loans to African nations had been renegotiated. Writing in The Atlantic, Bräutigam stated that the debt-trap narrative is “a lie, and a powerful one" and that her research shows that "Chinese banks are willing to restructure the terms of existing loans and have never actually seized an asset from any country".

Britain's Debt Justice charity, formerly the Jubilee Debt Campaign, found in a 2022 study, based on World Bank figures, that more African governments' external debts were being owed to Western banks, asset managers and oil traders (35%) than to Chinese lenders (12%). It also found that interest rates charged on western private loans (5%) were almost double that of Chinese loans (2.7%) and that "the most indebted countries were less likely to have their debt dominated by China".

Of 24 African countries that spent more than 15% of government revenue servicing debt in 2021, six countries - Angola, Cameroon, Republic of Congo, Djibouti, Ethiopia and Zambia - sent over a third of debt payments to Chinese lenders. Other private creditors accounted for over a third of payments in 12 countries.

In August 2022, the Ministry of Foreign Affairs of the People's Republic of China announced that it would forgive 23 interest-free loans that matured at the end of 2021 to 17 unspecified African countries.

As of 2023, there have been no Chinese asset seizures in Africa.

=== Kenya ===
Between 2006 and 2017, Kenya borrowed at least KSh. 1043.77 billion ($9.8 billion) from China. Chinese debt accounts for 21 percent of Kenya's foreign debt, and 72 percent of the country's bilateral debt. China lent Kenya funds to build highways and a railway between Mombasa and Nairobi totaling over US$6.5 billion by 2020. Kenya reportedly came close to default on Chinese loans to develop its largest and most lucrative port, the Port of Mombasa, in late December 2018; there was speculation that a default could have forced Kenya to relinquish control of the port to China. However, reports have cast doubt on Chinese debt-trap threat to the port. Kenyan media have debated whether Chinese loans are worth the risk, drawing analogies with the experience of Sri Lanka and saying that these loans could jeopardize Kenyan sovereignty.

=== South Africa ===
South Africa owes an estimated four percent of its annual gross domestic product to China. The country received multiple tranches of Chinese loans, some of which have raised concerns about opaque conditions and links to corruption. This includes a controversial $2.5 billion loan from the China Development Bank to the state-owned South African electrical utility Eskom which was arranged under the Jacob Zuma government. Another $2.5 billion loan to Eskom from Huarong Energy (a private Chinese company) was found improper by the Zondo Commission of Inquiry into state corruption, prompting Eskom chairperson Jabu Mabuza to say that the company would not repay the loan due to irregularities and corruption involved in the loan process.

An additional R 370 billion ($25.8 billion) loan from the China Development Bank during the presidency of Cyril Ramaphosa was made to promote a 2018 economic stimulus package. The South African government initially described the loan as a "gift"; details of the loan were not made public, generating controversy.

The government justified the loan, saying that the interest rate was not exorbitant but could not be disclosed due to a confidentiality clause. The loan was criticized by the opposition Democratic Alliance for risking the country's fall into a "debt trap".

=== Uganda ===
In October 2021, an investigation by the Parliament of Uganda concluded that non-public loan terms by Exim Bank of China for a $200 million expansion of Entebbe International Airport were onerous and could potentially lead to the loss of the airport in case of default. In November 2021, the Chinese embassy in Uganda rejected statements that the airport might be confiscated. A 2022 study of the loan contract by AidData stated that the airport was not at risk of seizure.

=== Zambia ===
Based on 2018 statistics in The Economist, China probably holds one-fourth to one-third of Zambia's external debt (comparable to other creditors, such as the U.S. and the World Bank. In July 2022, a committee of creditors co-chaired by China and France stated that they were committed to negotiating a restructuring of debt with Zambia under a G20 framework.

Academic Ching Kwang Lee's analysis of Chinese capital in Zambia contends that it is more adaptable and responsive to local Zambian needs than Western capital, which tends to take more uncompromising positions.

=== Elsewhere in Africa ===
- Nigeria: China owns $3.1 billion of the country's total $27.6 billion foreign debt. The Nigerian financial publication Nairametrics warned about falling into a Chinese debt trap because of Nigeria's problems with corruption.
- Djibouti: The country has borrowed to develop a strategic port, and Chinese loans total 77 percent of Djibouti's total debt. The country owes over 80 percent of its GDP to China, and became host to China's first overseas military base in 2017.
- Republic of the Congo: An estimated $2.5 billion is owed to Chinese lenders; the exact figure is unknown, even by the Congolese government.
- Egypt: China is financing the country's New Administrative Capital project. Gen. Ahmed Abdeen, who heads the Egyptian state-owned enterprise overseeing the new capital, criticized American reluctance to invest in Egypt during an interview: "Stop talking to us about human rights. Come and do business with us. The Chinese are coming—they are seeking win-win situations. Welcome to the Chinese."

== Asia ==
=== Sri Lanka ===
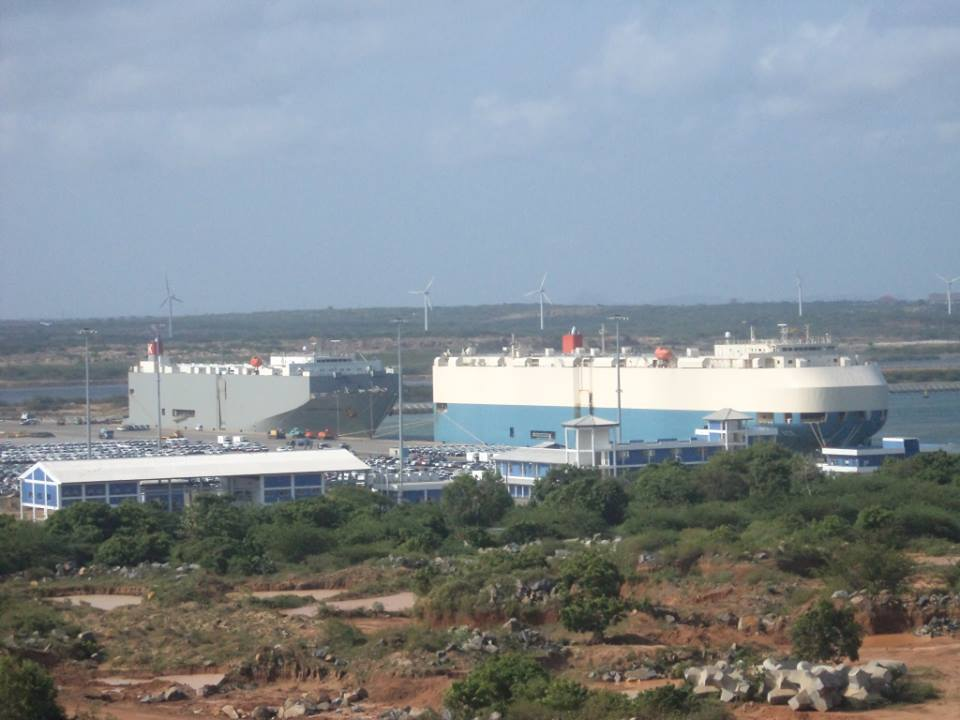
Loans from China to build the Hambantota International Port have been cited as examples of debt-trap diplomacy.

Beginning in the early 2000s, Sri Lanka sought international loans to develop Hambantota port. These efforts intensified during the presidency of Hambantota native Mahinda Rajapaska, who had made a campaign pledge to revitalize Hambantota's economy. The Rajapaska administration unsuccessfully sought loans from the United States and India before obtaining loans from China.

In Chellaney's original 2017 article, he presented Sri Lanka as "exhibit A", asserting that China became Sri Lanka's top lender and second-largest trading partner under the "quasi-autocratic" presidency of Mahinda Rajapaksa. He claimed that although Maithripala Sirisena defeated Rajapaksa in the 2015 presidential election with campaign promises to "extricate Sri Lanka from the Chinese debt trap" and then suspended work on Chinese-funded projects after taking office, Sri Lanka's increasingly-dire economic situation forced Sirisena's administration, in Chellaney's eyes, to take out more loans from China and "[acquiesce] to a series of Chinese demands," such as restarting the Port City Colombo project and selling China a $1.1 billion majority stake in the Hambantota International Port. To Chellaney, China's apparent interest in the Hambantota port had an underlying military dimension, as he asserted that China was docking attack submarines at Sri Lankan ports. These accusations became a major focus of subsequent commentary, whether concurring with or aiming to refute Chellaney's overall hypothesis, with a particular focus on Hambantota.

As of May 2024, Hambantota port is a transshipment center in the Indian Ocean, especially for vehicles, handling a monthly turnover of 700,000 units. The port also facilitated almost 600,000 tonnes of bunkering operations in 2023, following the leasing of its bunkering facility to Sinopec.

Many professionals writing prominent pieces against Chellaney's case gave Sri Lanka and Hambantota a similarly-prominent role in their counterargument, such as Deborah Bräutigam and Meg Rithmire in The Atlantic or international politics academics Lee Jones and Shahar Hameiri for Chatham House. Jones and Hamieri, for example, believe that debt-trap diplomacy is a myth, noting that recipient governments such as Sri Lanka undertake loans for their own domestic purposes like sustaining economic growth.

In contrast to various conditions imposed by the World Bank or IMF, China has attached few conditions to its loans to Sri Lanka, requiring no policy reforms or similar structural adjustments. The use of Chinese labor on the project funded by the loan is the only condition for most Chinese loans to Sri Lanka. Loans from China's government are estimated to be between 10 percent and 12 percent of Sri Lanka's external debts. However, when total loans, including commercial lending, are counted, loans from China overall rise to roughly 20 percent. It is not the dominant portion of Sri Lanka's debt stock. Instead international sovereign bonds, which are owned mostly by western private investors, make up 36.5 percent of Sri Lanka's external debt, and 47 percent of the total foreign debt repayments.

In 2023, The Diplomat wrote that the real cause of Sri Lankan debt crisis was due to the structure of the country’s debt itself, and specifically their exposure to ISBs issued at high interest rates. A significant portion of Sri Lanka's external debt had been owed to international sovereign bonds (ISBs) accounts, and between 2010 and 2021, the ISB portion of Sri Lanka’s external debt stock had tripled, and went up from 12 percent to 36 percent, and had grown to become 70 percent of the government’s annual interest payments, which cuts into the country's foreign reserves. In 2021, there was no immediate issue for servicing Chinese loans, but Sri Lanka had to repay US$1 billion in principal and an additional US$934 million in interest for the ISBs, which had then accounted for 47.5 percent of the nation's external debt servicing, and was twice the debt amount owed to China. Sri Lankan local media had suggested that when debt-servicing became difficult, Sri Lanka’s finance minister had attempted to turn to China to secure bilateral financing to avoid defaulting in the first place, but did not follow that path due to political reasons. By September 2022, of the $35.1 billion in Sri Lanka's foreign debt, roughly 19% of it was owed to China, 7% to Japan and 5% to India. Private investors accounts for the largest share with almost 40%, in which most of it is in the form of ISBs.

Critics of Chinese foreign policy argue that loans to Sri Lanka by the Exim Bank of China to build the Hambantota International Port and the Mattala Rajapaksa International Airport are examples of debt-trap diplomacy. Writing in Project Syndicate, Braham Chellaney in 2017, had claimed that China seized the port because Sri Lanka wasn't able to pay off Chinese debts, and forced an equity to debt swap where China would cancel $1.1 billion off Sri Lanka’s debt to China, in exchange for the port. Multiple media outlets had repeated the same narrative, however this was later proven to be incorrect on multiple levels. Contrary to Chellaney's narratives, a 2022 Johns Hopkins University study found that there were no Chinese debt-to-equity swaps, no asset seizures, and no "hidden debt".

In 2007, the state-owned Chinese firms China Harbour Engineering Company and Sinohydro Corporation were hired to build the port for $361 million. Exim funded 85 percent of the project at an annual interest rate of 6.3 percent. After the project began losing money and Sri Lanka's debt-servicing burden increased, its government decided to lease the project to state-owned China Merchants Port on a 99-year lease for cash. The $1.12 billion lease to the Chinese company was used by Sri Lanka to address balance-of-payment issues. This raised concerns in the United States, Japan and India that the port might be used as a Chinese naval base to contain the country's geopolitical rivals, and the Chinese government might foreclose on the project. Academic Muyang Chen writes that contrary to such narratives, the $1.12 billion in new equity by China Merchants Port increased Sri Lanka's foreign reserves and allowed its government to repay debts to non-Chinese creditors.

Brahma Chellaney noted that China had gained considerable diplomatic leverage during the presidency of Mahinda Rajapaksa and enlarged its footprint in Sri Lanka. When a new government took power, Sri Lanka was on the "brink of default" and the new government had no choice but "to turn around and embrace China again". Chellaney described the Hambantota port as a strategically important natural asset with long-term value to China, even if it lacked short-term commercial viability. He said that China does not evaluate a borrower's creditworthiness, and will lend even if a loan would place a borrower in debt distress. It was later learned that Sri Lanka's debt burden was $51 billion, and 95 percent of its government revenue was going to debt servicing.

A statement issued by 182 leading economists accused private creditors - mostly Western banks & hedge funds - who hold 40% of Sri Lanka's debt of effectively taking the country hostage.

Current Sri Lankan prime minister Mahinda Rajapaksa defended the country's relationship with China and rejected the country's debt trap image, adding that "China provided concessionary loans for many infrastructure projects [during the post-conflict development]." In regards to the Hambantota Port, he added, "The Hambantota Port is not a debt trap." Rajapaksa dismissed the view that Sri Lanka was forced to enter a 99-year lease with a Chinese company because of a failure to pay the project's debts, stating that the project is commercially viable and is transforming Sri Lanka's overall port infrastructure.

Karunasena Kodituwakku, the Sri Lankan ambassador to China, said that the Chinese government did not ask the Sri Lankan government to hand over the port; the Sri Lankan government initially asked China to lease the port. Other Sri Lankan representatives have noted that it made sense for Sri Lanka to welcome Chinese investment in the port because most of its commercial shipping was from that country."

Deborah Bräutigam has disputed the usage of the term "debt-trap diplomacy". Concerning Sri Lanka, Bräutigam has noted that Chinese banks have been willing to restructure the terms of existing loans. She said that the Canadian International Development Agency financed the Canadian engineering and construction firm SNC-Lavalin's feasibility study for the port, and its study concluded in 2003 that construction of a port at Hambantota was feasible. A second feasibility report, from 2006 by the Danish engineering firm Ramboll, reached a similar conclusion. According to Bräutigam, the port in Hambantota had to secure only a fraction of the cargo which went through Singapore to justify its existence. When President Maithripala Sirisena took office in 2015, Sri Lanka owed more to Japan, the World Bank, and the Asian Development Bank than to China; of the $4.5 billion in debt service Sri Lanka paid in 2017, only five percent was for Hambantota. Bräutigam was told by several Sri Lanka Central Bank governors that Hambantota (and Chinese finance in general) were not the major sources of the country's financial distress, and Bräutigam said that Sri Lanka did not default on any loans to China. Colombo had originally arranged a bailout from the IMF, but decided to raise the required funds by leasing the under-performing Hambantota Port to an experienced company as the Canadian feasibility study had recommended. Asanga Abeyagoonasekera, a Sri Lankan academic, warned of a Chinese ‘strategic trap’ in Sri Lanka. Strategic-trap diplomacy term was coined by Asanga Abeyagoonasekera and published initially on 16 September 2021, assessing the Chinese Debt-trap diplomacy in Sri Lanka at an interview with Voice of America.

Chatham House published a research paper in 2020 concluding that Sri Lanka's debt distress was unconnected to Chinese lending, but resulted more from "domestic policy decisions" facilitated by Western lending and monetary policy than from Chinese government policies. The paper was skeptical of the claim that China could use Hambantota as a naval base (calling it "clearly erroneous"), and noted that Sri Lankan politicians and diplomats have repeatedly insisted that the topic was never brought up with Beijing; there has been no evidence of Chinese military activity at, or near, Hambantota since the port's lease began.

Writing in 2023, academic and former UK diplomat Kerry Brown states that China's relationship to the Hambantota port has become the opposite of the theorized debt-trap modus operandi. Brown observes that China has had to commit more money to the project, expose itself to further risk, and has had to become entangled in complex local politics. Publishing in 2026, academic Carla P. Freeman concludes that there has been little evidence for the debt-trap theory in the case of Hambantota port. According to Freeman, the fact that the concessional agreement on the port did not swap debt for equity is additional evidence of the inaccuracy of the debt-trap narrative.

The lease was delayed for several months by concerns about possible military use and by opposition from trade unions and political parties, who called it a sellout of Sri Lankan national assets to China. Sri Lanka has indicated that it is reconsidering the lease of the Hambantota port to China.

In 2023, the Export-Import Bank of China (China Exim) provided Sri Lanka with an extension on its debts due in 2022 and 2023.

=== Pakistan ===
Pakistan has received $42.7 billion in World Bank assistance since 1980, of which $33.4 billion are loans and $9.3 billion are grants; this has allowed the bank to exert local and national decision-making power in the country via public contracts and the appointment of State Bank of Pakistan governors. According to State Bank data, Pakistan's debt to the People's Republic of China was $7.2 billion in 2017; it increased to $19 billion by April 2018 and $30 billion by 2020, primarily due to loans to fund China–Pakistan Economic Corridor (CPEC) projects. The New York Times reported the investments' emerging military dimension in December 2018, calling it an opaque, poorly-governed debt trap. Experts have estimated that Pakistan would require nearly 40 years to pay back its debt to China. A number of scholars have said that the CPEC "subordinates Pakistan's interests to China's", and the CPEC and Pakistan's growing economic dependence on China could become a threat to Pakistan's sovereignty. Academic Jeremy Garlick observes that Pakistan's structural economic problems and circular debt due to elite corruption predate the China-Pakistan Economic Corridor.

China and Pakistan signed a 2017 agreement to build five hydropower projects, with China investing $50 billion. According to Hassan Abbas, a Pakistani-American scholar in South Asian and Middle Eastern studies, project delays are likely to escalate costs to $98 billion. With accumulated interest of almost $5 billion per year, Pakistan would have to pay almost $200 billion over 20 years to China; scholars suggest that the debt could give China undue influence in Pakistan's affairs. Part of the agreement was scrapped by Pakistan in late 2017 due to objections to its terms.

=== Malaysia ===
China financed $22 billion in Malaysian projects during the administration of Prime Minister Najib Razak.

Malaysia has several Chinese Belt and Road Initiative projects under construction, including the East Coast Rail Line, Kuantan Port Expansion, Green Technology Park in Pahang, Forest City, Robotic Future City, and Samalaju Industrial Park Steel Complex.

In September 2018, Minister of Finance Lim Guan Eng cancelled two contracts, worth approximately $2.795 billion, with China Petroleum Pipeline Bureau for oil and gas pipelines. Mahathir Mohamad and Finance Minister Lim Guan Eng criticized the projects as expensive, unnecessary, superfluous, non-competitive (because open bidding was prohibited), conducted with no public oversight, and favored Chinese state-owned firms and those affiliated with Razak's United Malays National Organisation (UMNO) party at inflated prices. Residents of Malacca City said that the port was unnecessary, and the small company which received the contract had ties to the previously ruling UMNO.

Several months after the 2018 election, Mahathir resumed a pro-China approach, and the criticized projects were largely reinstated. He negotiated the East Coast Rail project from US$16 billion to US$11 billion, which lengthened its completion date by two years and re-routed the rail line. Mahathir pledged support for the BRI, and was a key opening speaker at the 2019 BRI Summit in Beijing.

=== Maldives ===
People's Majlis (the Maldives parliament) speaker and former president Mohamed Nasheed said in December 2019 that the Maldives owed China $3.5 billion in loans, which included $1.5 billion in government-to-government loans, private loans, and sovereign guarantees. Nasheed said that the Chinese debt trap was an economic and human-rights issue, and an issue of sovereignty and freedom of the island nation. Nasheed has also said that project costs were inflated, and the debt on paper is far greater than the $1.1 billion actually received.

=== Laos ===
According to the World Bank, by the end of 2021, Laos's public debt had skyrocketed to 88% of gross domestic product, with Chinese creditors accounting for a 47% share of foreign debt. In addition, Laos owes 11% of its debt to China from bilateral loans. The firing of Bank of the Lao P.D.R. Governor Sonexay Sitphaxay in June 2022 hints at the economic crisis and panic.

According to Brahma Chellaney, China has taken effective control of Laos's electricity grid and, by extension, its water resources. Given the small size of Laos's economy with just seven million citizens, he finds China being able to exert enormous power over its resources.

In October 2023, a senior economist at Singapore's ISEAS–Yusof Ishak Institute was quoted as saying that Laos was in "the definition of a debt trap," with the government starting to borrow from domestic lenders to repay China. He also emphasised that Laos believed that the Chinese Government "will not let another socialist country fail" and hence repeatedly eschewed help from other international lenders in favor of Beijing.

Lao president Thongloun Sisoulith commented on Laos's large external debt, saying:

"We have been hearing rumors about this 'debt trap,' and I just want to clarify that this is not the actuality that is facing our country. We want to reaffirm that the loan that we sought from any country is to help us build a building block for our economic development."

=== Tajikistan ===
By 2008, the People's Republic of China surpassed Tajikistan's other creditors in outstanding loans; by the following year, 77 percent of Tajikistan's total loan portfolio consisted of Chinese loans. In 2011, Tajikistan's parliament agreed to cede approximately 1,000 km^{2} (390 mi^{2}) of land to China in exchange for waiving an outstanding debt amounting to hundreds of millions of dollars.

Tajikistan's 2018 debts to foreign creditors ("external debt") were estimated at $2.9 billion, of which $1.2 billion is owed to China Exim. That year, reports indicated that Xinjiang-based TBEA was granted gold-mine concessions in remuneration for TBEA costs to build a 400-megawatt power plant in Dushanbe. At the end of 2020, Tajikistan's total external debt neared $3.1 billion; of this, $1.12 billion (about 37 percent of the total) was owed to the Exim Bank of China.

== Europe ==
China's BRI has made a number of investments in the European Union and continental Europe, including the port of Piraeus in Greece, Portugal's energy and transport sectors, and Hungarian railways. More than 12,400 freight trains travelled between China and Europe in 2020.

In April 2021, the Prime Minister of Montenegro asked the EU to help the country repay the $1 billion loan granted by the Exim Bank of China in 2014 to fund the A-1 motorway; it accounted for about 25 percent of Montenegro's external debt. Under the terms of the loan, China would receive thousands of hectares in case of non-payment. The project was called unfeasible and not economically viable in two feasibility studies by the European Bank of Reconstruction and Development and the European Investment Bank, the EU's rationale for refusing to fund it. With an estimated cost of $23.8 million per kilometre, it is one of the world's costliest highways. A paper by the China Africa Research Initiative called reporting of the land as collateral a rumor derived from mis-translation of a routine clause in the contract.

== Latin America ==
An article on CNBC said that Chinese investment in Latin America had been burgeoning and that the project has been heavily criticized amid allegations of debt-trap diplomacy and neocolonialism. These concerns have been pronounced, especially in Venezuela and Ecuador. A 2019 study compiled by Boston University's Global Development Policy Center stated that Chinese lending has not driven Latin American countries over IMF debt sustainability thresholds.

=== Ecuador ===
Ecuador has agreed to sell 80-to-90 percent of its crude oil to China through 2024 in exchange for US$6.5 billion in Chinese loans.

=== Venezuela ===
When Venezuela experienced economic distress, China was unable to secure either a return on its loans or the full amount of oil imports Venezuela had promised. China did not attempt to accumulate any Venezuelan assets even when it was clear Venezuela could not resume payment. China instead became unwilling to risk additional investment.

An article published by Carnegie-Tsinghua Center for Global Policy said China's loans in Venezuela are not debt-trap diplomacy nor "creditor imperialism", but simply "lose-lose" financial mistakes in which both parties stand to lose. An article in Quartz summarized the Carnegie article; "counter to the dominant narrative about Chinese debt ensnaring other countries, the country that needs to fear excessive and unsustainable Chinese lending the most is China".

== Pacific islands ==
In 2019, Lowy institute completed a systematic review of the evidence on whether or not China was doing debt-trap diplomacy in the Pacific Islands. Their findings were that China was not the main driver behind rising debt risks in the Pacific, nor was China the dominant creditor in the region. Only Tonga had China as a dominant creditor, but the researchers argued that this did not confer an advantageous position to China since they had to agree to defer repayments twice yet getting not much in return. They also found that Chinese lending terms were hardly predatory and that they "appear to be much more careful with loans", and concluded that "China has not been engaged in debt-trap diplomacy in the Pacific, as of yet". They also found the "overwhelming majority" of Chinese loans in the region are concessional enough to appear more like aid. However, they also noted that the majority of the Pacific nations that are currently indebted to China have little scope to take on more debts and recommended that China restructure their future approach to give more grant assistance, rather than more loans, to avoid overwhelming those nations with too much debts.

In March 2023, David Panuelo, president of the Federated States of Micronesia, wrote a letter accusing Beijing of bribery, spying and hostile takeovers: "Just because something is not technically legally binding doesn't mean you won't find yourself beholden to it".

== Other countries ==
China has made loans to Kyrgyzstan, Laos, and Mongolia as part of the BRI. It also made a $115 million loan to Tonga to redevelop its infrastructure, and $2 billion in loans to Papua New Guinea (almost one-fourth of the country's national debt). China also has ongoing projects in Trinidad and Tobago, including a $500 million Chinese-built dry dock and a $102 million industrial park in La Brea.

== See also ==
- Belt and Road Initiative
- Checkbook diplomacy
- Confessions of an Economic Hit Man
- Debt crisis
- Debt of developing countries
- Dollar diplomacy
- Economic diplomacy
- European debt crisis
- External debt
- Foreign policy of China
- Foreign relations of China
- Go Out policy
- Latin American debt crisis
- Life and Debt
- National debt of the United States#Chinese holdings of U.S. debt
- Predatory lending
- Privatization
- Sovereign default
- Structural adjustment
