= Truth to Power =

Truth to power is a non-violent political tactic.

Truth to Power may also refer to:

- "Truth to Power" (song), a song by OneRepublic
- Truth to Power (book), a book by South African power company executive André de Ruyter
- An Inconvenient Sequel: Truth to Power, a 2017 film documentary about Al Gore's raising awareness about climate change

== See also ==
- Speak Truth to Power (disambiguation)
