= André de Ruyter =

South African businessman

- Born: André Marinus de Ruyter; 20 March 1968 (age 58); Pretoria, South Africa
- Education: Die Hoërskool Menlopark; Nyenrode Business University (MBA); University of South Africa (BCL, LLB); University of Pretoria (BA)
- Occupation: Businessman

Chief Executive Officer of Eskom
- In office December 2019 – 22 February 2023
- President: Cyril Ramaphosa
- Preceded by: Phakamani Hadebe; Jabu Mabuza (acting)
- Succeeded by: Calib Cassim (interim)

André Marinus de Ruyter (born 20 March 1968) is a South African businessman who previously worked at Sasol and Nampak.

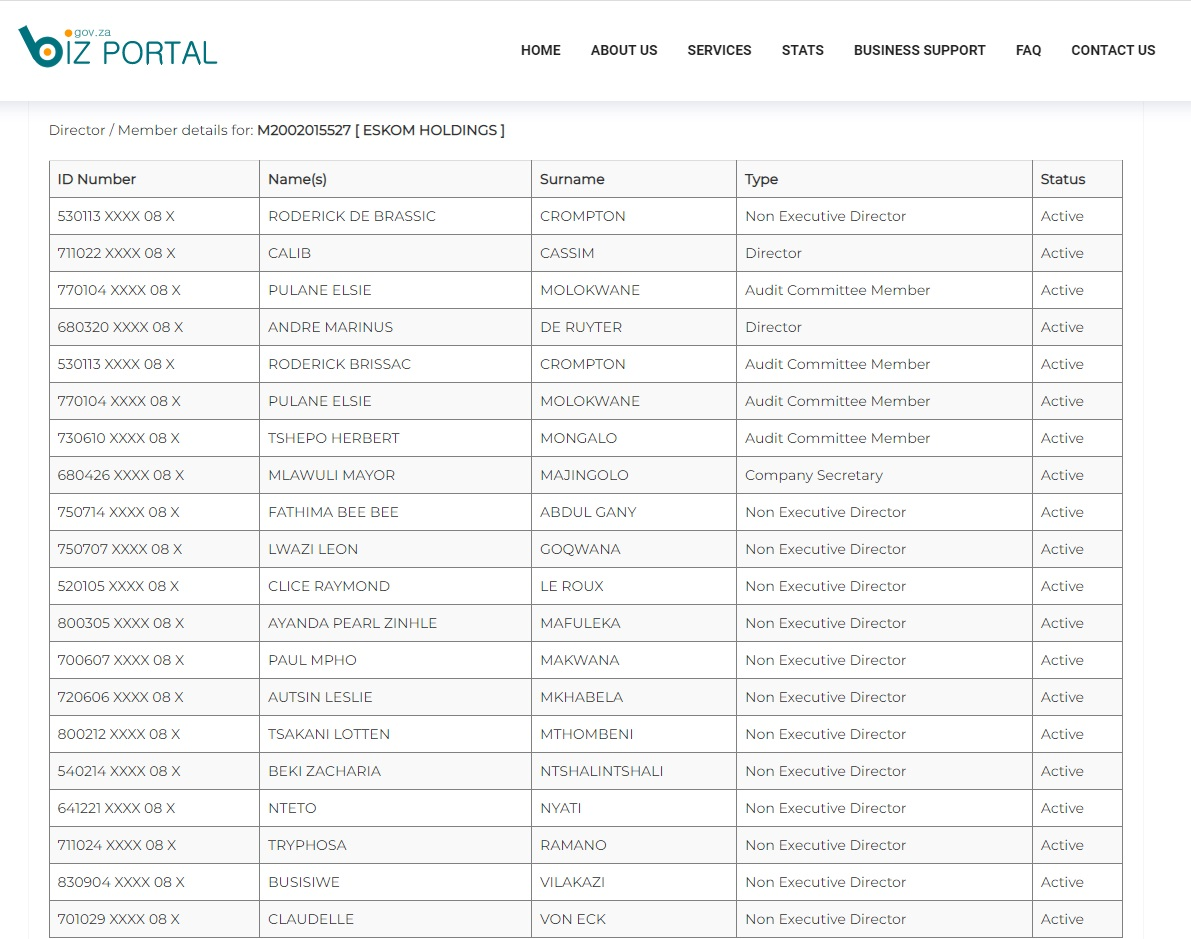
Eskom Holdings - Directors as at 23 February 2023

In December 2019, he was appointed CEO of Eskom, South Africa's state-owned electricity company. On 14 December 2022, it was reported that he would soon step down.

De Ruyter published a book, Truth to Power, in May 2023, which detailed his three years at Eskom, and the level of alleged pillaging, looting and political interference that contributed to the energy provider's downfall.

== Early life and education ==
De Ruyter was born in Pretoria in 1968. He holds a Bachelor's degree from the University of Pretoria, a Bachelor of Civil Law certificate and Bachelor of Laws degree from the University of South Africa, and a Masters of Business Administration from the Nyenrode Business University.

== Career ==
=== Appointment ===
In December 2019, de Ruyter was appointed CEO of Eskom, South Africa's publicly owned electricity company. According to The Citizen, during his tenure, de Ruyter targeted 'coal theft syndicates', improved maintenance, and oversaw a shift towards renewable power. However during his tenure South Africa suffered the worst electricity blackouts in history.

=== Resignation ===
On 12 December 2022, de Ruyter tendered his resignation as the CEO of Eskom. The following day at work, he allegedly drank a cup of coffee that had unknowingly to him been laced with cyanide. After he received medical treatment, a case of attempted murder was opened with the South African Police Service.

In December 2022, power cuts reached their severest levels ever. That same month, it emerged that de Ruyter had been criticized by Gwede Mantashe, Minister of Mineral Resources and Energy and Chairperson of the ruling African National Congress. Mantashe called de Ruyter a "policeman" and accused Eskom of "agitating for the overthrow of the state". After these remarks were reported, de Ruyter resigned, citing a loss of support from "the broader political economy".

Ghaleb Cachalia, Shadow Minister of Public Enterprises of the Democratic Alliance, South Africa's official opposition, accused Mantashe of a "relentless campaign against a man who despite having one hand tied behind his back" attempted to fight corruption. He further said that Pravin Gordhan, the Minister of Public Enterprises, had been "powerless in the face of Mantashe". The National Union of Metalworkers of South Africa welcomed his resignation, citing his "incompetence"; it further called for Gordhan's resignation.

In January 2023, de Ruyter stated power cuts would continue for two years.

On 22 February 2023, de Ruyter resigned with immediate effect, and Chief Financial Officer Calib Cassim was appointed as interim CEO.

His resignation followed an interview he gave to eTV. He alleged that theft and graft were leading to losses of R1 billion per month from Eskom, that a senior ANC MP was involved, and the police investigating his poisoning "confused a dose of cyanide with a sinus complaint". He also claimed that the Central Energy Fund had proposed to convert coal plants to gas operation following a visit by the Russian Minister of Energy, and noted at the same time that Russia was "very long on gas"; in response, the Fund accused him of "recklessness" and said that the proposal was made in view of the "base load capacity challenge". The Secretary General of the ANC, Fikile Mbalula, demanded evidence to substantiate the claims, threatened to "take action", and insisted that the ANC "is not corrupt".

== See also ==
- Eskom
- Gwede Mantashe, Minister of Mineral Resources and Energy
- Pravin Gordhan, Minister of Public Enterprises
- South African energy crisis
- Truth to Power (book)
