= Wanderers View =

- Wanderers View's location in Gauteng
- Coordinates: 26°11′34″S 28°02′37″E
- Country: South Africa
- Province: Gauteng
- City: Johannesburg
- Established: 1894

Area
  - Total: 0.8 km^{2} (0.31 sq mi)

Wanderers View is a suburb of Johannesburg, South Africa, about 1.2 km north of City Hall.

Bordering Braamfontein to the west and north, Hillbrow, and Johannesburg Park Station to the south, but according to Peter Raper in the New Dictionary of South African Place Names, it also the Station, the Eskom Centre, and the local YMCA all fall within the borders of Wanderers View as well. In the western part of the suburb, on Juta Street, was the Johannesburg Central Reformed Church building, which since 1997 has housed the Good News Community Church, also a Reformed Churches in South Africa (GKSA) church. On the opposite side of Wanderers View and one block north of Juta Street, on 117 De Korte Street, lies a park where the old Johannesburg Reformed Church (NGK) stood until its demolition in the 1990s. Alongside the church site stands a building that served for decades as the headquarters of the Southern Transvaal (later named High Veld) Synod of the Dutch Reformed Church in South Africa (NGK). Since the Synod moved to Kempton Park, the building has been known as SATAWU House.

== Sources ==
- Raper, Peter Edmund (2004). New Dictionary of South African Place Names. Johannesburg/Cape Town: Jonathan Ball Publishers.
- Stals, Prof. Dr. E.L.P (ed.) (1978). Afrikaners in die Goudstad, vol. 1: 1886 - 1924. Cape Town/Pretoria: HAUM.
