= Mohammed Ali Beshr =

Egyptian politician

Minister of State for Local Development
- In office 5 January 2012 – 4 July 2013
- Prime Minister: Hisham Qandil
- Preceded by: Ahmed Abdeen
- Succeeded by: Adel Labib

Personal details
- Born: 14 February 1951 (age 75) Kafr Mansha Qiwisna
- Party: Freedom and Justice Party
- Education: Menoufia University; Colorado State University

Mohammed Ali Beshr (also, Bishr; Arabic: محمد على بشر Egyptian Arabic: [mæˈħæmmæd ˈʕæli beʃɾ, bɪʃɾ]; born 14 February 1951) is an Egyptian politician who served as minister of state for local development from 5 January to 4 July 2013. He is one of the prominent figures of the Muslim Brotherhood in Egypt.

== Early life and education ==
Beshr was born in Kafr Mansha Qiwisna, Menoufia Governorate in Egypt, on 14 February 1951. He holds a bachelor's degree in engineering, which he received from Menoufia University in 1974. He also obtained a master's degree in power engineering from Shebeen Al Koum Menoufia University in 1979 and a PhD from Colorado State University in 1984.

== Career ==
Beshr is an academic. He worked at Menoufia University and Shebeen Al Koum Menoufia University. He joined the Muslim Brotherhood in 1979, and served as head of the students affairs committee, professionals committee and the administrative development committee of the group. Later he became a member of the Muslim Brotherhood shura council and one of the leaders of the group. In addition, he was charged with the Brotherhood's activities in the engineers syndicates beginning in 1997. Beshr was also a member of the Brotherhood's guidance office until 2008.

From 1990 to 1995 Beshr served as the parliament member of Menoufiya's first district. He was a member of the Egypt's Constituent Assembly in 2012, which was responsible for drafting a new constitution. In July 2012, Beshr was named as the deputy rapporteur of the assembly's government committee. On 4 September 2012, Beshr was appointed governor of Menoufia.

He was appointed minister of state for local development in a reshuffle to the cabinet headed by Hisham Qandil on 5 January 2013. He replaced Ahmed Abdeen as minister. Beshr is one of the eight members of the Freedom and Justice Party serving in the cabinet. He and other FJP members in the cabinet resigned from office on 4 July 2013 following the 2013 coup in Egypt. His term officially ended on 17 July 2013 when an interim government was formed.

== Arrest ==
Beshr was arrested by the Egyptian forces in 1999. After tried in military court, he was sentenced to three years in prison due to being a member of the Brotherhood. He was freed on 8 October 2002. In 2006, he was detained again together with forty other Brotherhood's supporters due to similar reasons.

== Personal life ==
Beshr is married and has three children.
