= Speak Truth to Power (disambiguation) =

Speak Truth to Power is a 1955 American Friends Service Committee pamphlet.

It may also refer to:

- Speak Truth to Power: Human Rights Defenders Who Are Changing Our World (2003), a book by Kerry Kennedy
- Speak Truth to Power (video contest), promoted by Robert F. Kennedy Human Rights

== See also ==
- Truth to Power (disambiguation)
