= Truth to Power (book) =

2023 book by Eskom CEO André de Ruyter

Truth to Power: My Three Years Inside Eskom
- Cover of the first edition
- Author: André de Ruyter
- Language: English
- Published: 14 May 2023
- Publisher: Penguin Random House South Africa
- Publication place: South Africa
- ISBN: 9781776390625
- Website: https://www.penguinrandomhouse.co.za/book/truth-power-my-three-years-inside-eskom/9781776390625

Truth to Power: My Three Years Inside Eskom is a 2023 book by ex-Eskom CEO, André de Ruyter.

It chronicles his three years at South Africa's state energy provider, Eskom. Fearing political forces might prevent its sale, the book was released ahead of schedule, and without warning, on the 14th of May, 2023.

The book details Eskom's systematic downfall through political meddling of the ruling ANC party, to organised syndicates who looted, pillaged and stole from the state utility.

The book comes on the heels of a series of explosive television interviews, in which de Ruyter openly accused the ANC of being the cause of almost all the issues at Eskom that were causing the country to suffer significant loadshedding.

The book received wide media coverage in the days following its release, with several newspapers publishing extracts online.

== Eskom power crisis ==
Primarily, the book outlines the systemic and often-politically supported wholesale looting of Eskom, from its supplies, to machinery. Also alleged is orchestrated sabotage, in which power stations and their power-producing machinery were deliberately made to fail.

== See also ==
- South African Energy Crisis
- The President's Keepers
