= Brahma Chellaney =

Indian geostrategist and writer

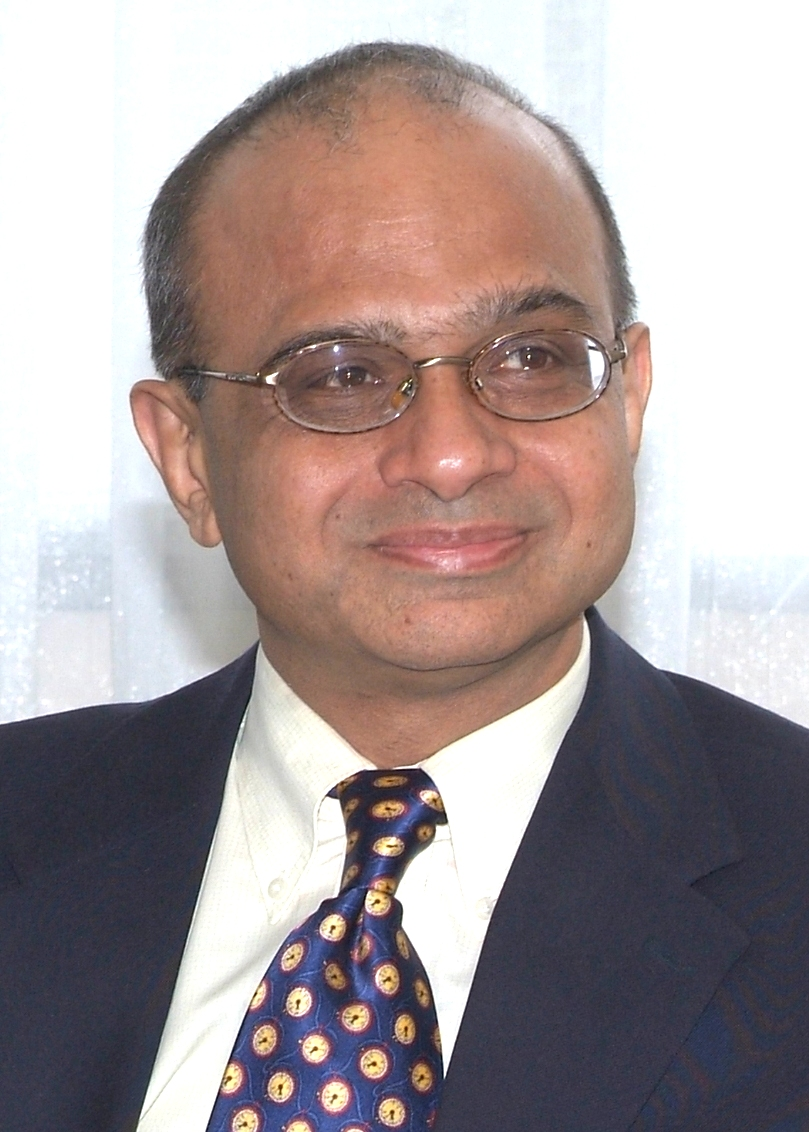
- Chellaney in 2009
- Born: 18 January 1962 (age 64); New Delhi, India
- Education: Hindu College, Delhi; Delhi School of Economics; Jawaharlal Nehru University
- Occupations: Academic and public intellectual
- Website: chellaney.net

Brahma Chellaney (born 18 January 1962) is an Indian geostrategist and columnist. He is a professor of strategic studies at the Centre for Policy Research in New Delhi; a Richard von Weizsäcker Fellow of the Robert Bosch Academy in Berlin; and an affiliate with the International Centre for the Study of Radicalization at King’s College London. He was a member of India's National Security Advisory Board and an author of its draft nuclear doctrine. He is a regular columnist for Project Syndicate, and writes for numerous other international publications.

== Education and career ==
Chellaney was born in New Delhi. After passing the Senior Cambridge examination at Mount St. Mary's School, India, he did a Bachelor of Arts (Honours) from Hindu College, University of Delhi and a Master of Arts from the Delhi School of Economics. He holds a PhD in international studies from the Jawaharlal Nehru University.

He is a Professor of Strategic Studies at the New Delhi-based Centre for Policy Research; a Richard von Weizsäcker Fellow with the Robert Bosch Academy in Berlin; and a nonresident affiliate with the International Centre for the Study of Radicalization at King's College London. In the mid-2000s, he was a member of the Indian government's Policy Advisory Group, which was chaired by the External Affairs Minister of India. Before that, he was an adviser to India’s National Security Council, serving as convener of the External Security Group of the National Security Advisory Board.

== Career ==
Chellaney was described in The New York Times in 1999 as "one of the independent experts who helped draft India's proposed nuclear doctrine". The country's draft nuclear doctrine was publicly released in August 1999. The institutions where he has held appointments include Harvard University, the Norwegian Nobel Institute, the Brookings Institution, the Paul H. Nitze School of Advanced International Studies at the Johns Hopkins University, and the Australian National University. Graham Tobin from the University of South Florida has as described Chellaney’s geopolitical analyses as astute and critical.

Chellaney coined the term debt-trap diplomacy to describe how the Chinese government leverages the debt burden of smaller countries for geopolitical ends. He saw 'debt trap diplomacy' in China's handling of Sri Lanka's debt distress by taking over its Hambantota port on a long-term lease. The thesis caught on and began to be used widely, becoming "something approaching conventional wisdom", especially in Washington DC. Other scholars have disputed the assessment, and the "myth of debt trap", arguing that Chinese finance was not the source of Sri Lanka’s financial distress.

== Publications ==
Chellaney is the author of nine books.

- Asian Juggernaut: The Rise of China, India and Japan, HarperCollins USA, 2010. ISBN 9780061987625
- Water, Peace, and War: Confronting the Global Water Crisis, Rowman & Littlefield, 2015.
- Water: Asia's New Battleground, Georgetown University Press, 2019.

Two of his most recent books relate to the geopolitics of water resources. Another book, an international best-seller, focuses on how a fast-rising Asia has become the defining fulcrum of global geopolitical change.

== Reception ==
Chellaney was criticized by Chinese state-owned media outlet the Global Times for indirectly accusing China of having involvement in the death of Bipin Rawat. The Global Times described Chellaney as a "conspiracy theorist".

Chellaney received the $20,000 Bernard Schwartz Award from the New York-based Asia Society for his work, Water: Asia's New Battleground, published by Georgetown University Press. The award recognises outstanding contributions regarding contemporary Asian affairs and US-Asia relations.
