= Sere Wind Farm =

- Country: South Africa
- Location: north of Koekenaap, Western Cape
- Coordinates: 31°29′49″S 18°03′48″E
- Status: Fully Operational
- Owner: Eskom
- Operator: Eskom

Wind farm
- Type: Onshore

Power generation
- Units operational: 46 turbines
- Nameplate capacity: 100 MW

Sere Wind Farm is a windfarm in the Western Cape province of South Africa that is one of the largest windfarms in Southern Africa with a production capacity of 100 MW. The project is estimated to have cost R2.689 billion ($375 million). Eskom stated that the plant was fully commissioned on 31 March 2015.

It is located north-west of Vredendal, approximately 300 km (190 mi) north of Cape Town. It occupies a 16 km^{2} (6.2 sq mi) area on Gravewaterkop farm in Skaapvlei north of the mouth of the Olifants River near the town of Koekenaap on the west coast of South Africa.

== Development ==
The Sere Wind Farm is the first foray into large scale wind energy for the country's largest utility, Eskom. The plant will help meet to South Africa's long-term renewable energy and CO_{2} mitigation strategy as set out in the Power Sector Integrated Resource Plan 2010-2030. As such the project was given to South Africa's largest state owned power company Eskom for development in an effort to diversify the company away from coal fired energy production. By 2030 South Africa aims to meet 42% of its national demand for power using renewable energy sources. It is estimated that the project will create 140 direct jobs during the construction phase and 10 permanent jobs once the plant is operational. It is targeted to reduce South Africa's CO_{2} emissions by 5 million tons during its first 20 years.

== Design ==
The plant consists of 46 Siemens 2,3VS-108 turbines, each generating 2,3 MW positioned over a 16 km^{2} (6.2 sq mi) area. The Sere site's capacity factor is in the 26% to 32% range at heights between 80 and 100 metres (260 and 330 ft). The wind regime has been ranked as Class III (moderate to low wind).

== See also ==
- List of wind farms in South Africa
