= Kendal Power Station =

Power station in Mpumalanga, South Africa

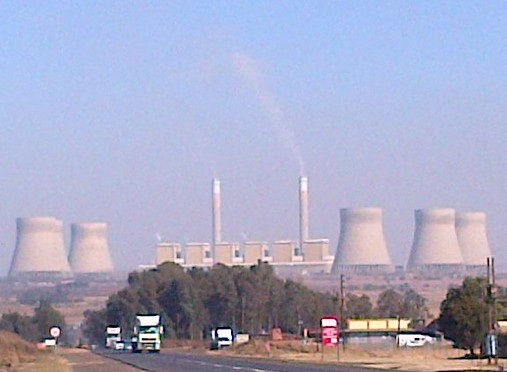
- Location of Kendal Power Station in South Africa
- Country: South Africa
- Location: Mpumalanga
- Coordinates: 26°5′24″S 28°58′17″E
- Status: Operational
- Commission date: 1988
- Owner: Eskom
- Operator: Eskom

Thermal power station
- Primary fuel: Coal
- Turbine technology: Steam turbine

Power generation
- Units operational: 6
- Units planned: 6 × 686 MW
- Nameplate capacity: 4,116 Megawatt

External links
- Commons: Related media on Commons

Kendal Power Station is a coal-fired power station in Mpumalanga, South Africa. It is sited in a coal-mining area; one of its sources is AEMFC's coal mine at Vlakfontein, near Ogies.

== History ==
=== Design ===
Kendal was built between 1982 and 1993. The first unit went online in 1988. On completion in 1993 it became the world's largest indirect dry-cooled power station. The total station water consumption of a dry-cooled system does not exceed 0,2lkWh, compared with the 2,5lkWh consumed by wet-cooled systems. Evaporation losses in wet-cooled systems account for approximately 80% of the water requirements of a conventional wet-cooled power station.

Kendal is fired with coal mined in the Bombardie Cologne coalfield. Twin overland conveyors transport the coal from the mine through the stock-yard into the coalbunkers.

For each unit there is one cooling water system, including the cooling tower with its tuber bundle heat exchangers, three circulating pumps (units 4 to 6) two circulating pumps), one hot and one cold duct and a condenser. The circulating water cools the condensate in the condenser.

The boilers are of the controlled circulation sub-critical design with coal-fired radiant furnaces and reheating. Kendal's turbines are of the tandem compound reaction type. The two chimneys are 275 m, high structure, each having three internal brick flues, and their foundations rest on weathered bush-veld granite. With a height of 165 m and a base diameter of 165 m each, the cooling towers are the largest in the world. Each shell required 16 800 m³ of concrete and 1 170 tons of reinforced steel to construct.

Kendal is currently the 22nd largest coal-fired power station in the world and largest power station of any kind in Africa.

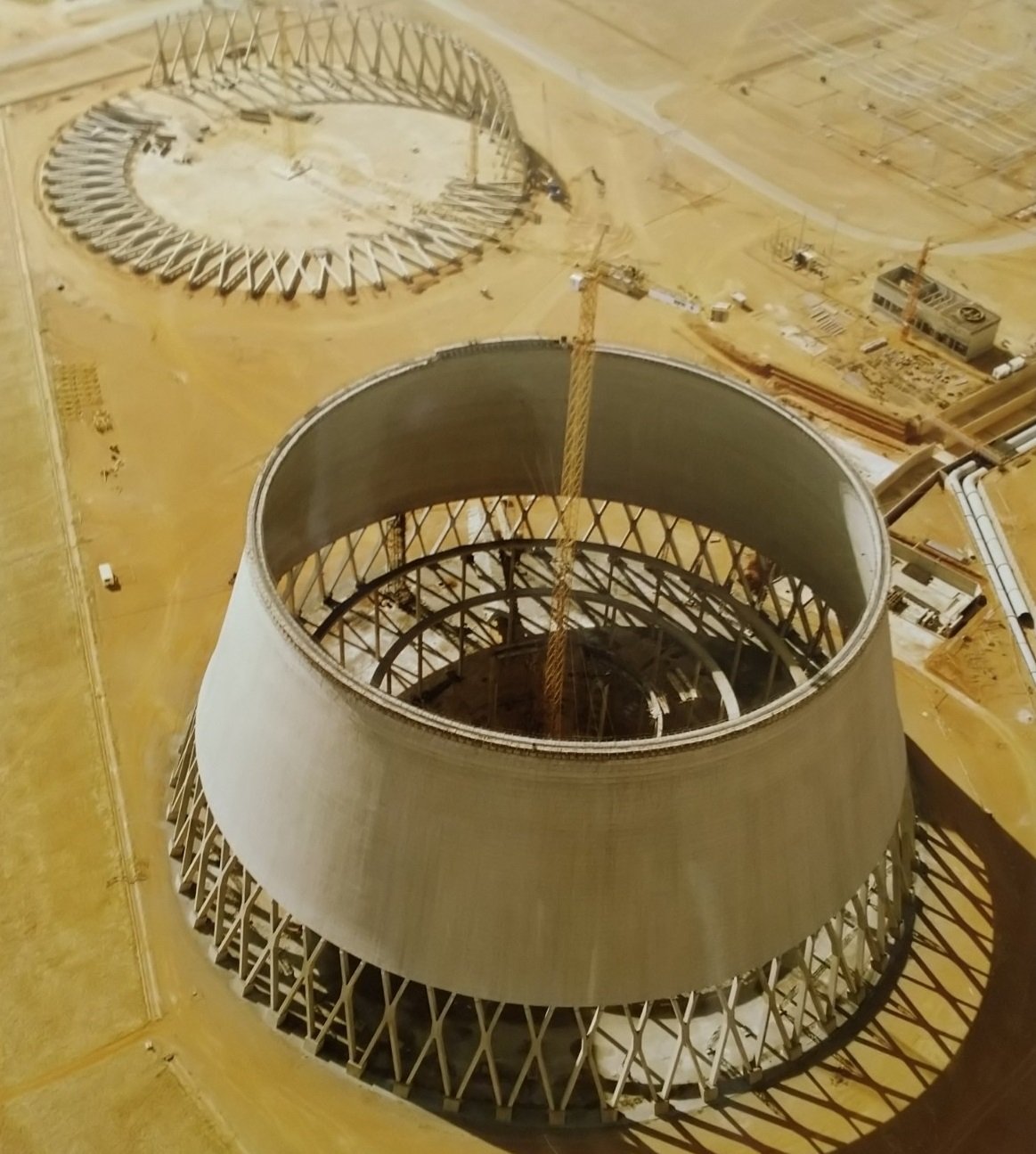
Construction of the Kendal Power Station Dry Cooling Towers by Concor Construction, 1983

== Power generation ==
Power generation is done by six 686 MW units for a total installed capacity of 4,116 MW. Design efficiency at rated turbine MCR: 35.30%

== Environmental problems ==
In 2009, Kendal was the 10th most polluting power plant in the world.

Following a period of non-compliance of all six generation units at Kendal in 2018 and 2019, the Department of Environment, Forestry and fishery issued a Compliance Notice to Eskom on 10 December 2019, compelling operation of two units to cease, and ordered corrective measures to be undertaken in compliance with the Kendal's Atmospheric Emissions License (AEL). On 27 November 2020, Eskom was served with a summons for supplying misleading information to an Air Quality Officer. This followed an internal investigation and report prepared by Eskom Audit and Forensic (A&F) into air quality compliance and reporting, initiated by Eskom CEO Andre de Ruyter on 17 May 2020 following investigations and articles by EE Business Intelligence on these matters.

== See also ==
- Eskom
- Fossil-fuel power plant
- List of power stations in South Africa
