= Hendrina Power Station =

Power station in Mpumalanga, South Africa

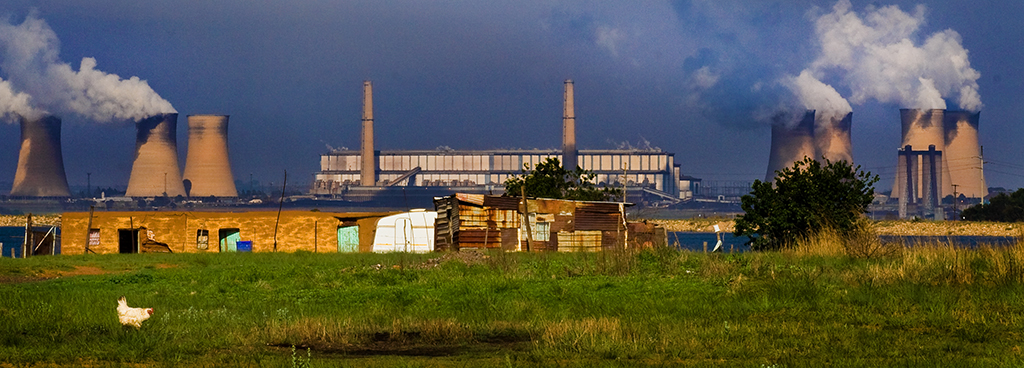
- Country: South Africa
- Location: Mpumalanga
- Coordinates: 26°2′S 29°36′E
- Status: Operational
- Commission date: 1970
- Owner: Eskom
- Operator: Eskom
- Employees: 1,000 (2013)

Thermal power station
- Primary fuel: Coal
- Turbine technology: Steam turbine

Power generation
- Units operational: 10
- Units planned: 10 × 200 MW
- Nameplate capacity: 2,000 Megawatt

External links
- Commons: Related media on Commons

Hendrina Power Station in Mpumalanga, South Africa, is one of South Africa's oldest operating power stations.

== History ==
Hendrina Power Station came into operation between June 1970 and December 1976. Between 1995 and 1997 half of Hendrina's 10 units were refurbished and the other half between 1999 and 2001.

== Power generation ==
The coal-burning station contains ten AEG Kanis 200 MW units with a total installed capacity on 2,000 MW. Design efficiency at turbine MCR (Maximum Continuous Rating) is 34.20%. Hendrina, which is the only 10-unit power generating station in South Africa, is the world's largest AEG Kanis turbine installation.

A 25 MW / 100 MWh gravity battery is planned for the site.

== See also ==
- Eskom
- Fossil-fuel power plant
- List of power stations in South Africa
