= XMLVend =

XMLVend is a South African developed, open interface standard, which facilitates the sale of prepaid electricity credit between electricity utilities and clients. It is an application of web services to facilitate trade between various types of devices and a utility prepayment vending server.

This standard is already being introduced and used in prepaid water.
