= Business Unity South Africa =

Major South African trade association

- Nickname: BUSA
- Established: 2003; 23 years ago
- Merger of: Business South Africa and the South African Chamber of Business
- Type: Nonprofit trade association
- Registration no.: 2014/042417/08
- Headquarters: Sandton, Gauteng, South Africa
- Region served: South Africa
- Members: 65 (2026)
- Official language: English
- Key people: Mxolisi Mgojo (President); Khulekani Mathe (CEO)
- Affiliations: Business at OECD; International Organization of Employers; Business Unity Africa
- Website: busa.org.za

Business Unity South Africa (BUSA) is the largest trade association in South Africa, representing numerous large local companies, and industry-based trade organisations. Essentially, BUSA can be thought of as a trade association for trade associations, representing South African business as a whole. Its stated aim is to influence policy development to enable an environment for inclusive economic growth and employment in South Africa.

Founded in 2003, BUSA is a nonprofit, and is headquartered in Sandton, Gauteng.

The organisation is akin to international counterparts such as BusinessEurope, the US Chamber of Commerce, the Business Council of Australia, and the Confederation of British Industry.

With 65 members as of mid-2026, BUSA represents most of SA's largest companies, and is the country's largest federation of business organisations in terms of GDP and employment contributions.

== History ==
BUSA was founded in October 2003, through a merger of Business South Africa and the South African Chamber of Business. It commenced operations the following year.

In 2025, BUSA hosted the B20 Summit. The B20 is an annual global business forum that serves as the official dialogue between the G20 and the global business community.

== Operations ==
The organisation serves to represent South African business as a whole, and is the officially recognised business representative at the National Economic Development and Labour Council (NEDLAC). BUSA interfaces with the South African Government, makes submissions to Parliament and other bodies, as well as represents South African business on numerous state institution boards and global organisations. These include the SADC Private Sector Forum, Business Africa, the B20, and the International Organisation of Employers.

=== Members ===
BUSA's members include trade associations, chambers of commerce and industry, professional organisations, and associate members. As of mid-2026, BUSA has a total of 65 members. The organisation's policy allows for a maximum of 16 corporate members. The organisation represents most of SA's largest companies.

== See also ==
- Economy of South Africa
- National Economic Development and Labour Council
- Business Leadership South Africa
