= Ahmed Abdeen =

Retired Egyptian military officer and former minister

Minister of State for Local Development
- In office 2 August 2012 – 5 January 2012
- Prime Minister: Hisham Qandil
- Preceded by: Mohamed Attia
- Succeeded by: Mohammed Ali Beshr

Personal details
- Party: Independent

Ahmed Zaki Abdeen or Abdin is a retired Egyptian military officer and former minister of state for local development in the Qandil cabinet.

== Career ==
Abdeen is a retired military general. He was appointed head of Dar El-Hayaa El-Handasia which is affiliated with the armed forces. He also worked as an engineer officer in Egypt's Armed Forces and a military attaché at the Egyptian Embassy in Washington, D.C. from 1993 to 1995. He then served as the head of the Egyptian Central Agency for Public Mobilization and Statistics, and of the CCAMLR construction cooperatives. He was appointed governor of Beni Suef in 2006. Then he was named as the governor of Kafr El-Sheikh in 2008. He retained his post in the August 2011 reshuffle of governors and it led to protests due Abdeen's alleged close link to National Democratic Party.

He was appointed minister of state for local development on 2 August 2012, replacing Mohamed Attia. His major function in this post was to maintain a link between the central government and all the regional governors and assemblies. The other main function of him was to organize local council elections. When he was in office, his proposal to close down shops at 10 pm in Egypt led to controversy. This controversial proposal was not put into effect. Abdeen was replaced by Mohammed Ali Beshr as minister of state for local development in a cabinet reshuffle on 5 January 2013.
