= Eskom Centre =

- Interactive map of Eskom Centre

General information
- Status: Completed
- Type: Business-use
- Location: Johannesburg, South Africa
- Coordinates: 26.1950475°S 28.0394292°E
- Completed: 1958

Height
- Roof: 61.24 metres (200.9 ft)

Technical details
- Floor count: 17

Design and construction
- Architects: RC Rinaldi & Partners

The Eskom Centre is an office tower in the Central Business District of Johannesburg, South Africa. It was built in 1955 to a height of 61 metres. The building was the headquarters of Eskom from 1958 until the company relocated to Sandton in the mid-1980s. The building was the tallest building in Johannesburg when it was finished in 1958. The building was so high compared to other buildings in Johannesburg that it was the only one that could be seen from the patch of veld that is now called Kensington B.

== Background ==
Eskom Centre replaced Eskom House, a building in the city centre built in 1937. The location is in Braamfontein on a block surrounded by Smit, Harrison, Loveday and Wolmarans Streets. Situated on the site of an old dairy and residential properties, the land was purchased for R522,441. The architects were R C Rinaldi & Partners and it was built for R3,709,241. The construction period was twenty-seven months with the building completed in October or November 1958. The building has 17 floors, was a height of 61.24 metres and had an underground area 13.6 metres below ground level. By the middle of the sixties, the company had again outgrown the building with staff spread out to other buildings. Eventually a decision was made to purchase land north of Sandton as a future headquarters site.
