= Phakamani Hadebe =

South African business executive

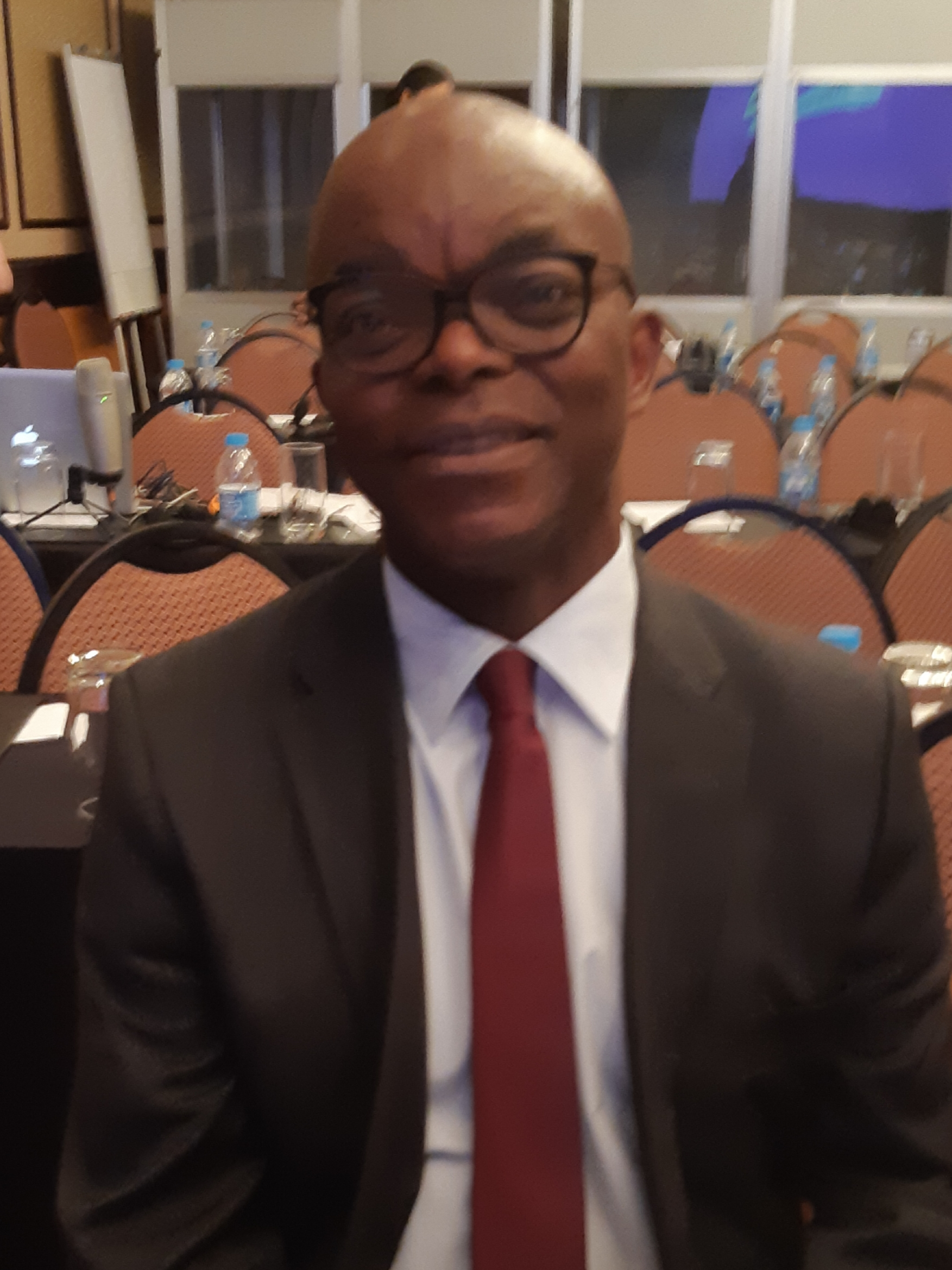
- Born: Phakamani Hadebe
- Education: University of Durban-Westville; University of Sussex; Wharton Business School
- Occupation: Corporate Executive
- Known for: CEO of Eskom

Phakamani Hadebe is a South African business executive. He was the Group Chief Executive of Eskom and former CEO of the Land and Agricultural Development Bank of South Africa.

He has a master's in economics from the University of Durban-Westville, an MA in Rural Development from the University of Sussex, is an alumnus of the Wharton Business School and the IMF Institute.

Hadebe worked in the National Treasury from 2003 to 2008 serving as Head of Assets and Liabilities. From 2008 to 2013 he was the chief executive officer and Director of the Land and Agricultural Development Bank of South Africa during which he laid charges against the Bank's former CEO (Philemon Mohlahlane) for corruption. Mohlahlane was convicted for corruption in 2018. From December 2013 until January 2018 Hadebe was head the corporate and investment banking division of Working Limited.

== Eskom ==
Hadebe was made acting CEO and director of Eskom. He was appointed as CEO of Eskom in May 2018. He resigned from his position at Eskom a year later on the 26 May 2019 citing poor health and the difficult circumstances of the job as the reason for the resignation. His resignation sparked a debate amongst political parties over the difficult state of managing the financially strained state owned company and raised concerns over the possibility of finding a capable replacement. According to his successor Andre de Ruyter, Hadebe's health issues were significantly exacerbated by his period as CEO and resulted in an on-job collapse.
