= Eskom =

South African electricity public utility

- Type: Public utility
- Traded as: JSE: BIESKM
- Industry: Energy
- Founded: 1 March 1923; 103 years ago
- Headquarters: Sunninghill, Sandton, South Africa
- Key people: Mteto Nyati (Chairman); Dan Marokane (Group Chief Executive); Calib Cassim (Chief Financial Officer)
- Services: Electricity generation, transmission and distribution
- Revenue: ▲ R 354.724 billion (2026)
- Net income: ▲ R 30.45 billion (2026)
- Total assets: ▲ R 1024.62 billion (2026)
- Total equity: ▲ R 350.0 billion (2026)
- Number of employees: ▲42,030 (2026)
- Subsidiaries: List: Amazing Amanzi (Pty) Ltd EON Solutions Africa (Pty) Ltd Escap SOC Limited Escap Ltd Eskom Enterprises (Pty) Limited Eskom Enterprises Global West Africa Eskom Finance Co (Pty) Ltd Eskom Finance Company SOC Limited Eskom Uganda Limited Gallium Insurance Co. Ltd Golang Coal (Pty) Ltd Hem-kom Live Line Engineering(pty) Limited Mountain Communications (Pty) Ltd PN Energy Services (Pty) Ltd Rosherville Vehicle Services (Pty) Ltd Rotek Industries (Pty) Limited South Dunes Coal Terminal (Pty) Ltd Technology Services International (Pty) Ltd Ted (Pty) Ltd The Natal Navigation Colliers & Estate Company Limited Trans Africa Projects (Pty) Ltd Transpoint (Pty) Ltd
- ASN: 37121
- Website: www.eskom.co.za

Eskom Hld SOC Ltd or Eskom is a South African state-owned electricity public utility. Eskom was established in 1923 as the Electricity Supply Commission (ESCOM) (Afrikaans: Elektrisiteitsvoorsieningskommissie (EVKOM)). The organization represents South Africa in the Southern African Power Pool.

The utility is the largest producer of electricity in Africa, and was among the top utilities in the world in terms of generation capacity and sales. It is the largest of South Africa's state owned enterprises. Eskom operates a number of notable power stations, including Matimba Power Station and Medupi Power Station in Lephalale, Kusile Power Station in Witbank, Kendal Power Station, and Koeberg Nuclear Power Station in the Western Cape Province, the only nuclear power plant in Africa.

The company is divided into Generation, Transmission and Distribution divisions, and together Eskom generates approximately 95% of electricity used in South Africa, amounting to ~45% used in Africa, and emits 42% of South Africa's total greenhouse gas emissions. By releasing 1.6 million tons of sulphur dioxide into the air in 2019, Eskom is also the largest emitter of sulphur dioxide in the power industry in the world.

Eskom has periodically implemented rolling blackouts since January 2008, a practice ascribed to basic dereliction of duty by former president Thabo Mbeki which were later discontinued in early 2024, but electricity supply issues still linger. Implementation of new generating capacity during this period was fraught with delays and cost overruns which brought the utility to the brink of bankruptcy.

At the 2021 United Nations Climate Change Conference, a deal was announced for developed countries to fund South Africa's transition from coal power to renewable energy. However, employment in the mining sector threatens this transition.

In 2019, it was announced that Eskom was to be split up into three distinct nationally owned entities, due to huge debts and poor reliability of supply. In July 2026, the process was formally approved by President Cyril Ramaphosa, thus paving the way for the end of Eskom's monopoly, through the establishment of a fully independent, state-owned transmission system operator (TSO). The Presidency said the process would restructure South Africa's electricity sector, to create competition, unlock investment, ensure energy security, and reduce electricity prices.

== History ==
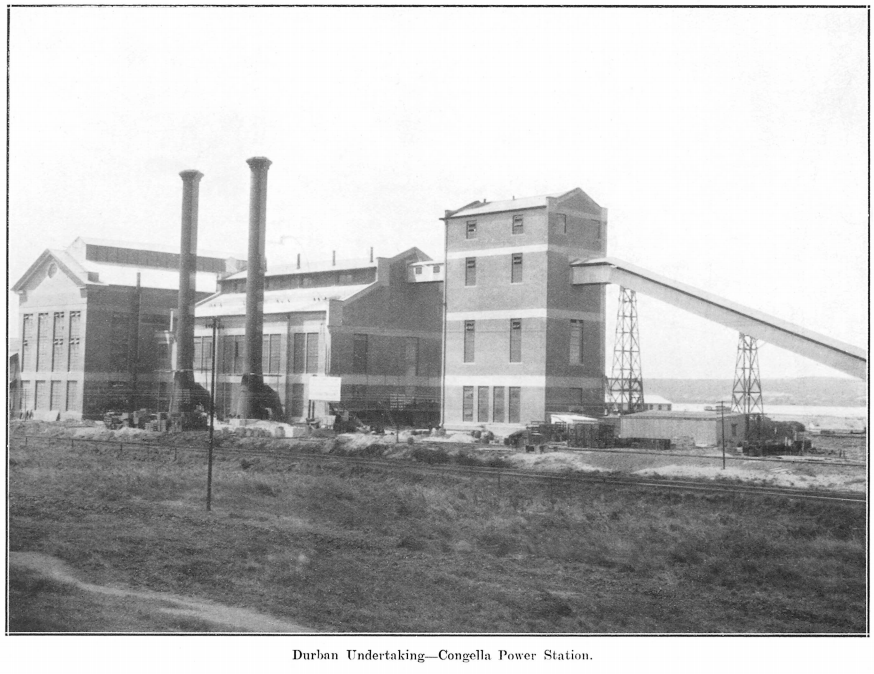
The Congella Power Station completed in 1928 was one of the first power plants built and owned by Eskom.

Prior to the establishment of Eskom, the provision of electricity was dominated by municipalities and private companies. The city of Kimberley was one of the first users of public electricity when it installed electric streetlights in 1882 to reduce crime at night. This was followed by Cape Town in 1895 with the construction of the Graaff Electric Lighting Works to power 775 street lights.

Eskom was founded by the Electricity Act of 1922 which allowed the South African Electricity Control Board to appoint Hendrik Johannes van der Bijl as chairman. The company changed its name by combining the two acronyms in its previous name (ESCOM and EVKOM) in 1987 to become known as Eskom.

The Electricity Act stated that Eskom could only sell electricity at cost and was exempted from tax with the firm initially raising capital through the issuing of debentures, later issuing state-guaranteed loans instead. The coal-fired Congella Power Station in Durban and Salt River Power Station in Cape Town were the first power stations built by Eskom, both completed in mid-1928.

One of Eskom's first power plants was a coal-fired 128 MW station in Witbank, completed in 1935 to provide power to the mining industry. The plant was built and run in partnership with the privately owned Victoria Falls and Transvaal Power Company, which owned a number of other power plants across the country. Thanks to state support, Eskom was able to buy out the Victoria Falls and Transvaal Power Company in 1948 for £14.5 million (roughly equivalent to £2.55 billion in 2017). Following World War 2, South Africa experienced power shortages that led to Eskom negotiating power saving agreements with the mining industry in June 1948.

=== Logos ===
Eskom's logo has been an integral symbol of the company since its founding. For a brief period in 1986 Eskom had no logo when it was moving away from the company's original logo of stylised letters spelling "ESC" within a circle to the more contemporary version with a blue shield with a stylised lightning bolt in its centre. The 1987 logo was replaced in 2002 with its current logo that replaced the shield with a circle but otherwise kept the logo as it was.

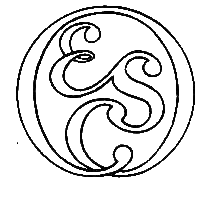
1923

1987

2002

=== First expansion period: 1960-1994 ===
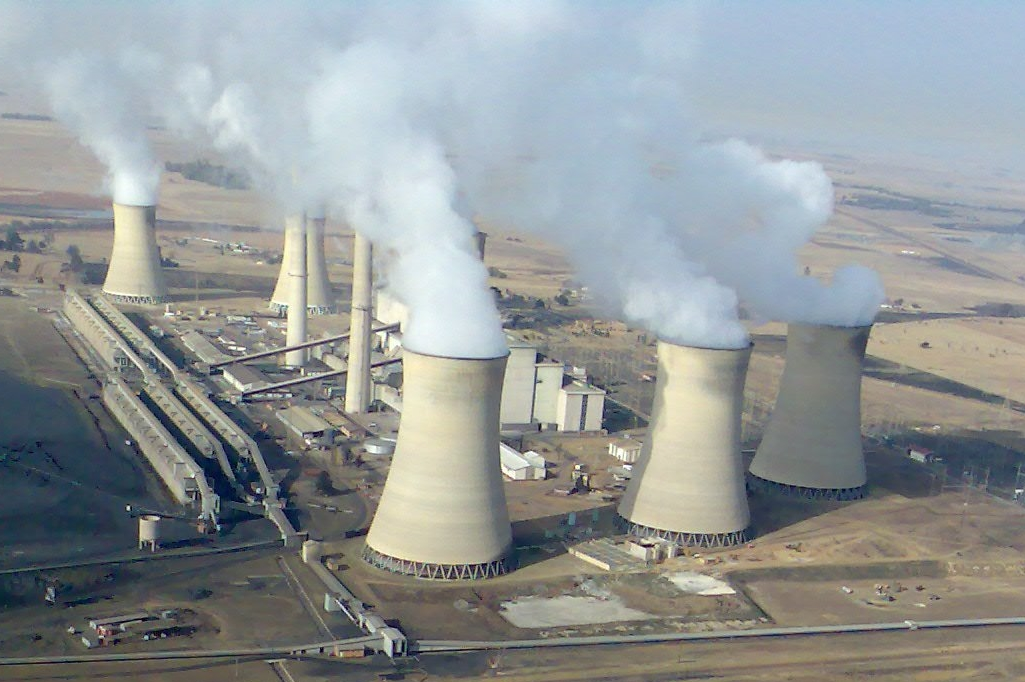
Arnot Power Station completed in 1975 was one of the first of the "six-pack" coal-fired power plants built during this period that Eskom was well known for.

From 1960 to 1990 Eskom increased its installed power production capacity from 4,000 MW to 40,000 MW so as to keep up with rapid economic growth in the 1960s and 70s. During the same period, Eskom established a nationwide 400 kV power network. During this period the company built a number of large standardised coal-fired power plants that could produce power at very low cost due to the large economies of scale. These plants were known colloquially as "six-packs" for the 6 large generator units they were designed to accommodate.

In 1974 the company was instructed to start work on Koeberg nuclear power station to both provide power to Cape Town and help facilitate the South African government's nuclear program.

In 1981 Eskom was involved in one of its first large financial scandals when its Assistant Chief Accountant was caught embezzling R8 million from the company (equivalent to roughly R164.37 million in 2018).

During the 1970s the company controversially sought to increase electrical tariffs to help pay for its large expansion plans. Due to its financial situation, the government appointed Dr. W.J. de Villiers to chair a commission that recommended a number of financial and organisational changes for the company to adopt. This led to the company abandoning its no-profit objective and to raise funds by taking out international loans. The number of Eskom employees was also reduced from 66,000 to 60,000 in the late-1980s.

=== Post-1994 election period: 1994-2007 ===
Following democratic elections in 1994 and the start of the Mandela government the company changed focus to electrification of previously neglected residential homes and to provide low cost electricity for economic growth. Following the passing of the 1998 Eskom Amendment Act, the government's powers to influence company policy and investment decisions were greatly expanded. Due to the South African government's attempted privatisation of Eskom in the late 1990s during the administration of President Thabo Mbeki, Eskom requests for budget to build new stations were denied. After leaving the presidency, Mbeki would later state in December 2007 that this was an error, resulting in adverse affects for the South African economy.

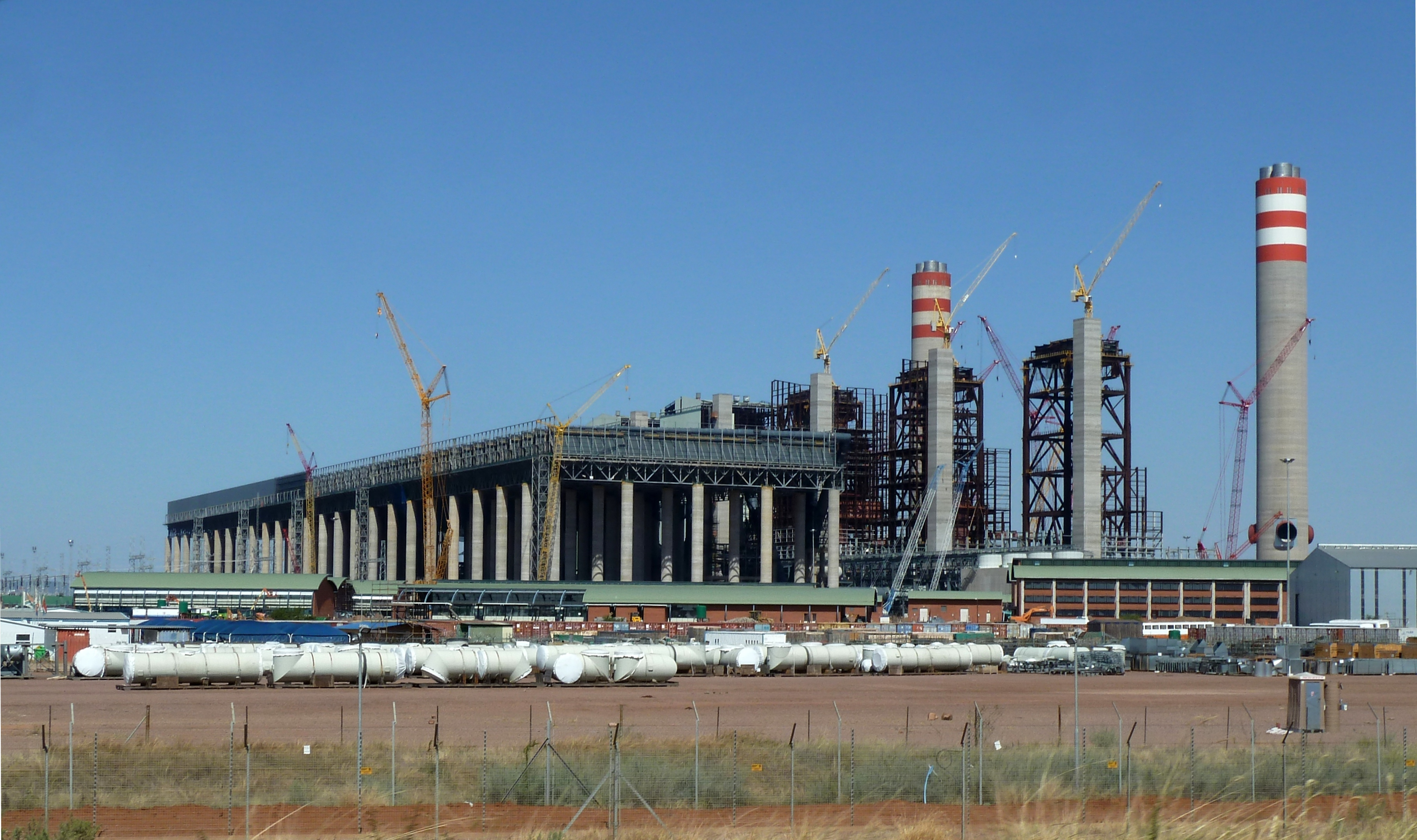
Construction work on the Medupi (pictured) and Kusile coal-fired power stations was started in the 2007-2019 period as part of Eskom's capacity expansion program following the energy crisis.

In December 1998, a white paper prepared by the Department of Minerals and Energy recommended that the government restructure Eskom into separate generation and transmission businesses. Although the report predicted that this action would improve power supply and reliability, it was never enacted.

=== Load shedding and second expansion: 2007-2023 ===
In February 2006, Eskom announced "load shedding" in the Western Cape province, due to issues experienced by Koeberg Nuclear Power Plant this continued until June 2006. In January 2008, Eskom controversially introduced load shedding nationally (rolling blackouts) based on a rotating schedule, in periods where short supply threatened the integrity of the grid. Demand-side management has focused on encouraging consumers to conserve power during peak periods in order to reduce the incidence of load shedding.

Following the national power shortage in 2007, Eskom embarked on an aggressive electricity production expansion programme during the administration of President Jacob Zuma. The Zuma administration decided to focus expansion efforts on building additional large scale six-pack coal-fired power plants.

In 2016, Eskom stated it intended to pursue a nuclear solution to the country's energy shortage. According to projections from late 2016, the use of nuclear power would provide over 1000 GW of power by 2050. In preparation, the company launched a training program for 100 technicians, engineers and artisans that would certify them as nuclear operators. In January 2018, Eskom's acting chief financial officer stated that the company could not afford a new build, following a 34% drop in interim profits due to declining sales and increasing financing costs. The government stated it would proceed with the plan but more slowly.

In 2017, Eskom was the focus of a major corruption scandal involving the Gupta family and the administration of then President Jacob Zuma.

The National Energy Regulator of South Africa denied an application by Eskom to increase electricity tariffs by a future 19.9% for the financial year 2018/19. The regulator instead granted a 5.2% increase and gave a list of reasons for the refusal to grant higher tariffs that the South African newspaper Business Day stated painted "a picture of inefficiency, inaccurate forecasting and cost overruns" at the power utility. Part of the refusal was the finding that Eskom had 6,000 more employees than needed, costing the company R3.8 billion annually.

In February 2019, shortly after the announcement by government that the company would be broken up, Eskom initiated another round of emergency load shedding. Eskom stated that the 2019 load shedding was initiated due to breakdowns at power stations as well as the depletion of water and diesel resources. Other reasons cited included legacy issues from state capture corruption, coal availability, and that new power plants such as Medupi and Kusile were not yet operational.

Corruption during the Zuma administration had been noted as a major factor in the cost overruns and long delays in completing Medupi and Kusile power plants that had a knock-on effect leading to the 2019 power shortages. The power shortage and related troubles at Eskom was blamed as a significant contributing factor to a 3.2% decline in GDP growth in the first quarter of 2019, prompting fears of a recession in 2019.

In December 2019, President Ramaphosa, Deputy President David Mabuza and Ministers Gwede Mantashe and Pravin Gordhan met with Eskom's board and management to discuss the energy crisis. The president attributed the recent blackouts partly to sabotage at the Tutuka Power Station in Mpumalanga which had caused a loss of 2000 megawatts of electricity, and announced measures to bring an end to load-shedding. Mantashe and Gordhan were tasked with presenting ways to increase electricity capacity to the cabinet, which would include self-generation. Amid the crisis, Jabu Mabuza resigned from his post as chairperson of Eskom's board in January 2020.

Between March and July 2020 the power supply was stable due to reduced demand during the COVID-19 lockdown, but on 12 July a new round of level 2 load shedding began due to the breakdown of generating units.

During the winter of 2023, the country experienced Stage 6 blackouts, shaving a projected 2% off the country's GDP. During the worst period, power cuts lasted 12 hours a day. The company faces theft of materials for resale, sabotage to force repairs to be made at corruptly inflated prices, and assassination attempts which may be motivated by the attempt to replace coal with renewable sources.

=== Recent developments: 2024 to present ===
In recent years, under the Cabinets of President Cyril Ramaphosa, and especially under the coalition Third Cabinet (the Government of National Unity/GNU), there have been significant efforts to restructure the energy sector in South Africa. These efforts have been aimed at bringing about an end to Eskom's monopoly, increased competition, and cheaper electricity prices.

In December 2025, Minister of Electricity and Energy Kgosientsho Ramokgopa approved a "revised unbundling strategy" which would split Eskom into separate distribution, generation, renewable energy, and transmission units, under a single holding company. However, the strategy would allow Eskom to retain ownership of the grid, rather than transferring it to an independent transmission system operator (TSO). Naturally, this faced pushback from opposition politicians and the business community.

However, in his State of the Nation address in February 2026, President Cyril Ramaphosa overruled the Minister, confirming that the new TSO would be a fully independent, state-owned company that would directly own and control the transmission assets.

Ramaphosa also removing the Minister's autonomy to oversee the unbundling process by establishing a National Energy Crisis Committee (NECOM) task team - the Eskom Restructuring Task Team (ERTT). The Task Team was instructed to report back with a final roadmap (a Phase I report) for moving the TSO assets out of Eskom.

The ERTT was given an extended 30 June 2026 deadline for its Phase I report. In July that same year, the details of the report were revealed. The ERTT determined that the restructuring was feasible, aligned with international best practice, and could be done without compromising Eskom’s financial sustainability. Furthermore, the report identified several actions that could be taken immediately to enable the restructuring.

As part of the process, there is to be clear delegation of authority from Eskom to the National Transmission Company of South Africa (NTCSA) of all decision-making related to the market, financial, and operational ring-fencing of NTCSA from Eskom. The NTCSA Board is able to appoint its own CEO and senior management, and directors serving on the Eskom board will not be appointed to the NTCSA board. Under the plan, decisions on access to the transmission network are to be relocated to the NTCSA, and eventually to the newly-formed TSO.

In July 2026, despite pushback from both Eskom and ironically his own Minister of Electricity and Energy, President Ramaphosa announced the end of Eskom's monopoly on the South African electricity sector. He endorsed a plan to create an entirely independent, state-owned transmission system operator (TSO) - the entity responsible for managing the transmission of SA's electricity.

The Task Team was given instructions to produce a Phase II report within three months (by November 2026), outlining a detailed implementation plan, with timeframes for completing the restructuring.

== Installed capacity ==
=== Subscribers ===
Eskom – the only electricity utility in the country – has 16,789,974 subscribers in South Africa, comprising about one-third of the population.

=== Fossil-fuelled power stations ===
Power plant	Province	Type	Date commissioned (planned)	Capacity (MW) (planned)	Status	Notes
Acacia Power Station	Western Cape	Gas turbine	1976	171	Operational	
Ankerlig Power Station	Western Cape	Gas turbine	2007	1,338	Operational	
Arnot Power Station	Mpumalanga	Coal-fired	1971-1975	2,352	Operational	
Camden Power Station	Mpumalanga	Coal-fired	1967-1969; 2005-2008	1,561	Operational	
Duvha Power Station	Mpumalanga	Coal-fired	1980-1984	3,600	Operational	
Gourikwa Power Station	Western Cape	Gas turbine	2007	746	Operational	
Grootvlei Power Station	Mpumalanga	Coal-fired	1969-1977; 2008-2011	1,180	Operational	
Hendrina Power Station	Mpumalanga	Coal-fired	1970-1976	1,893	Operational	
Kendal Power Station	Mpumalanga	Coal-fired	1988-1992	4,116	Operational	
Komati Power Station	Mpumalanga	Coal-fired	1961-1966; 2009-2013	990	Operational	
Kriel Power Station	Mpumalanga	Coal-fired	1976-1979	3,000	Operational	
Kusile Power Station	Mpumalanga	Coal-fired	(2017–2025)	3,200 (4,800)	4/6 units operational	
Lethabo Power Station	Free State	Coal-fired	1985-1990	3,708	Operational	
Majuba Power Station	Mpumalanga	Coal-fired	1996–2001	4,110	Operational	
Matimba Power Station	Limpopo	Coal-fired	1987-1991	3,990	Operational	
Matla Power Station	Mpumalanga	Coal-fired	1979-1983	3,600	Operational	
Medupi Power Station	Limpopo	Coal-fired	2015–2019	4,764	Operational	
Port Rex Power Station	Eastern Cape	Gas turbine	1976	171	Operational	
Tutuka Power Station	Mpumalanga	Coal-fired	1985-1990	3,654	Operational	

=== Renewable and nuclear power stations ===
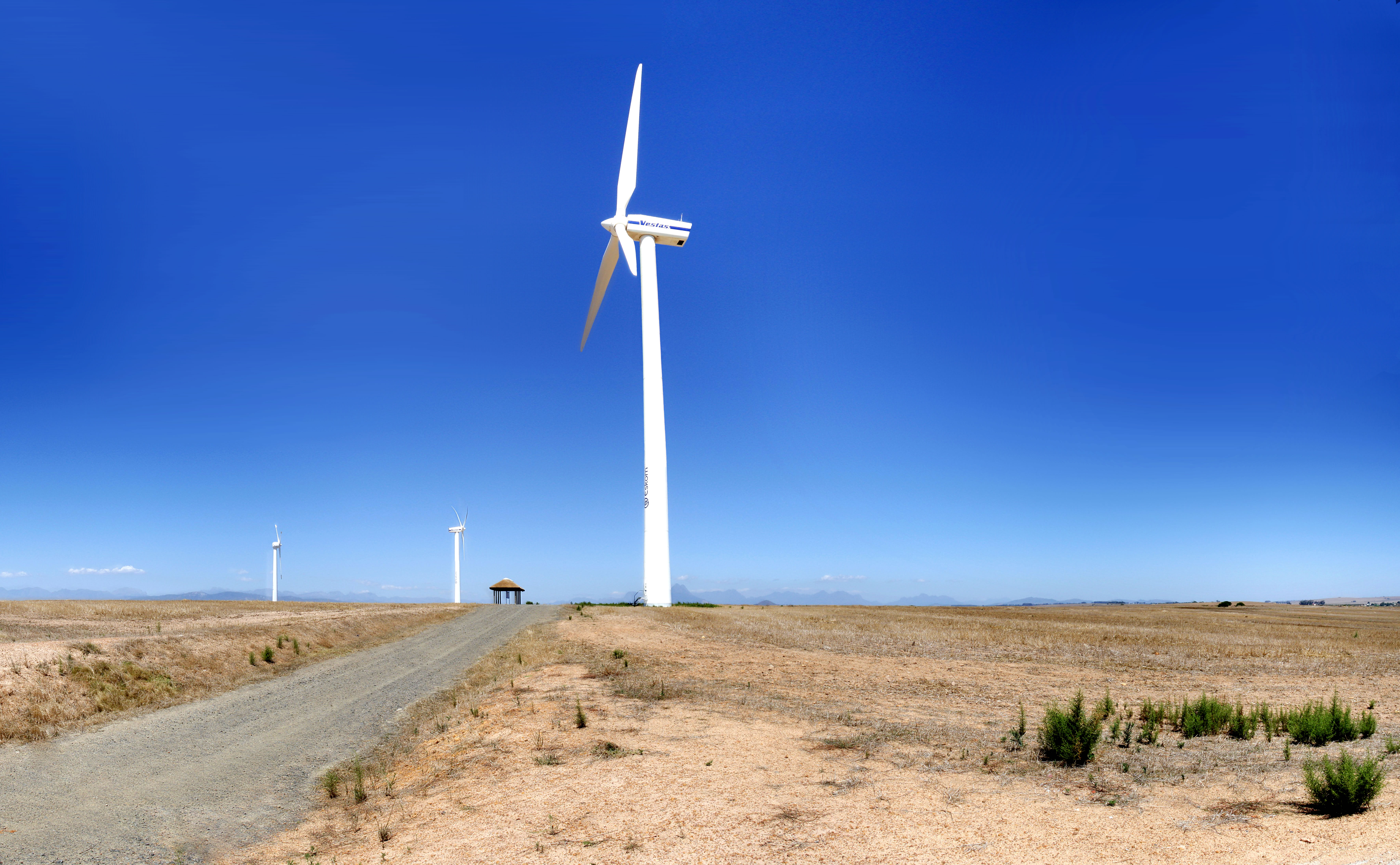
Eskom Generation's pilot wind farm facility at Klipheuwel in the Western Cape, South Africa

Power plant	Province	Type	Date commissioned	Installed capacity (MW)	Status	Notes
Colley Wobbles Power Station	Eastern Cape	Hydroelectric	1984	42	Operational	
Drakensberg Pumped Storage Scheme	Free State	Hydroelectric	1981	1,000	Operational	
Gariep Dam	Free State-Eastern Cape border	Hydroelectric	1971	360	Operational	
Ingula Pumped Storage Scheme	KwaZulu-Natal	Hydroelectric	2017	1,332	Operational	
Koeberg Power Station	Western Cape	Nuclear	1984	1,860	Operational	
Ncora Dam	Eastern Cape	Hydroelectric	1972	2.1	Operational	
Palmiet Pumped Storage Scheme	Western Cape	Hydroelectric	1988	400	Operational	
Sere Wind Farm	Western Cape	Wind	Jan 2015	100	Operational	
Vanderkloof Dam	Northern Cape	Hydroelectric	1977	240	Operational	

=== Future projects ===
Eskom has a number of planned infrastructure projects to further expand electrical production.

- Tubatse Pumped Storage Scheme – 1500 MWe
- Wind 500 – 550 MWe
- Tasakoolo Wind Farm 200 – 200 MWe

=== Investment in renewables ===
As of October 2019 Eskom Holdings SOC Ltd issued a tender to introduce 20 three-phase KW inverters and mountains structures. These structures are planned to distribute power to four power plants, and would introduce Eskom into the solar energy market. The African Investment Forum has announced that it has raised over $40.1 billion in investment into developing new infrastructure, related to renewable energies. This is aimed to help distance itself from Eskom coal power plants, and to focus more on wind and solar developments. The African investment forum is backed up by corporate organisations and lenders, private donors, and the African Development Bank. These new inverters would be align with South Africa's Integrated Resource Plan (IRP).

Eskom signed a Memorandum of Understanding (MOU) with Exxaro in April 2025, in relation to the former's intention to decarbonise.

In May 2025, Eskom issued an invitation for companies to tender for the construction of a pilot renewable green hydrogen facility (RHF) at its Johannesburg Research, Testing and Development (RT&D) unit. The company stated that developing renewable green hydrogen production capacity was a key priority in its mission to achieve net-zero carbon emissions by 2050 in South Africa. During the same announcement, Eskom confirmed that it is also accelerating the establishment of a separate renewable energy business.

==== South Africa's integrated resource plan ====
The IRP supports a diverse energy mix with policy aimed to help aim to meet the need of South Africa's energy goals. The Integrated Resource Plan supports electrical infrastructure developments with an aim focused on renewable energy sources. These new investments are directed towards more high efficiency, low emission standards with an emphasis on solar technologies in which 6,000 MW of new Solar PV capabilities and 14,400 MW of new wind power technologies. With renewable energies, the IRP plans to increase its investment in hydro-electric power.

==== Investment in renewables, hydro, wind, solar ====
With failing power plants and coal not working as a viable solution, progress towards a greener future is in sight for South Africa. In agreement to the Paris Agreement, South Africa needs to reduce its carbon emission and cut-back from being dependent on Coal. There is new US$11 Billion Green-Energy Initiative aimed at the development of solar and wind. This new initiative would allow loans to Eskom and below commercial rates on conditions that it would accelerate its closure of power plants and to start building renewable energy structures. This plan takes the steps in moving away from coal, and investing in alternative methods that better suit their needs for the future.

=== Other infrastructure ===
In 2002, Eskom was issued a network operator licence. It embarked on a $100 million project installing fibre optic cables on 10 000 kilometres of its existing power lines for the purpose of real-time monitoring of the electrical network; 80% consists of all-dielectric lashed cabling and 10% All-dielectric self-supporting cabling. It currently has the sixth most ASN prefixes of all registered network operator licensees.

== Corporate affairs ==
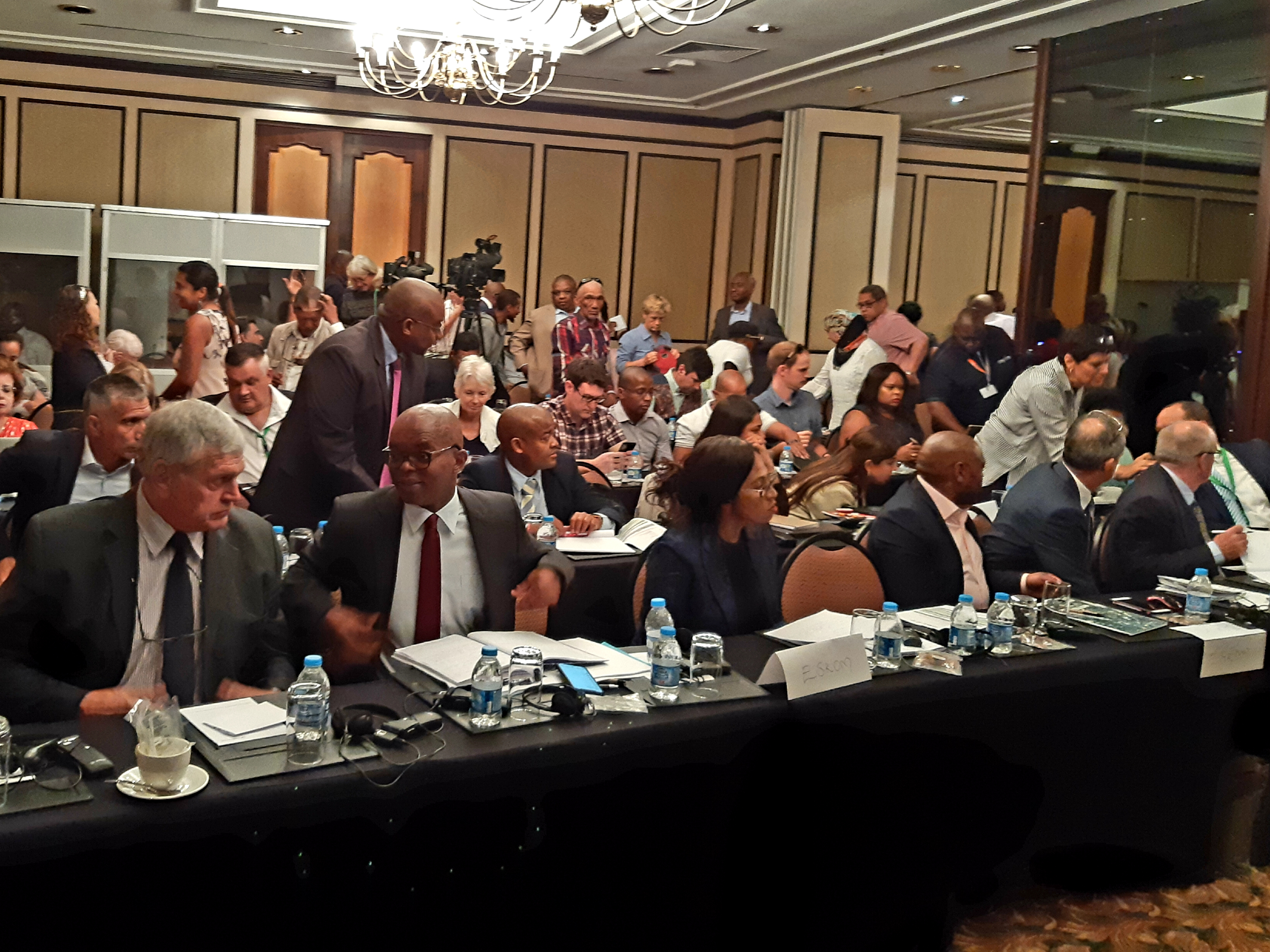
Eskom executives including Phakamani Hadebe (CEO), front row second from the left, and Jan Oberholzer (CTO), front row far left, at a 2019 public forum in Cape Town on Eskom's financial situation

In 2011 eight out of ten Eskom board members were controversially sacked by the Zuma administration. From 2015 to 2017 the Zuma administration appointed Ben Ngubane as chairperson of the board. Brian Molefe was appointed by Zuma as Eskom CEO from April 2015 to November 2016. Molefe and Ngubane's tenure was controversial for their involvement with the Gupta family and for allegedly allowing the company to become a vehicle for state capture. Ngubane also controversially attempted to blacklist newspapers perceived as unfriendly to Eskom.

During parliament's state capture inquiry in 2017 former Eskom chairperson Zola Tsotsi (2012–2015) testified that Gupta family member Tony Gupta made threats against Tsotsi allegedly stating that Tsotsi will lose his job as he was not 'helping' the Guptas. In December 2016, Matshela Koko, former head of generation for Eskom, was named as acting CEO. He resigned in 2018 after being implicated in awarding contracts to a company linked to his stepdaughter. Koko, along with his wife and stepdaughter, were arrested in October 2022.

In early 2018, following the establishment of the Ramaphosa government, multiple members of the Eskom board and executive team were replaced by government due to allegations of corruption and mismanagement.

Phakamani Hadebe was made acting CEO and director of Eskom in May 2018 as part of President Ramaphosa's replacement of the company's executive team. A year into his term as CEO Hadebe resigned citing poor health and the difficult circumstances of the job. His resignation sparked a debate amongst political parties over the difficult state of managing the financially strained state owned company as well as the lack of political cover he was given to deal with labour unions and tackle corruption.

Six months after Hadebe's departure, former Nampak Chief Executive André de Ruyter was appointed CEO of Eskom. De Ruyter's appointment was criticised by the EFF and factions within the ANC who instead wanted a black CEO appointed to the position. De Ruyter resigned in December 2022 after repeated attacks on him by Gwede Mantashe, Minister of Mineral Resources and Energy partly due to de Ruyter's advocacy for replacing coal with renewables as an energy source.

SA media outlet News24 reported that he was not given the support needed to succeed in the position. Shortly after the announcement that de Ruyter would be leaving Eskom it was reported that he survived a poisoning attempt after he unknowingly drank a cup of coffee at his office that was laced with cyanide.

=== Financials ===
	2011	2012	2013	2014	2015	2016	2017	2018	2019	2020	2021
Revenue (R billion)	91.45	114.8	128.9	138.3	147.7	164.2	177.1	177.4	179.8	199.5	204.3
Operating profit (R billion)	14.5	22.3	3.99	13.2	11.1	15.7	15.5	20.5	−1.77	4.41	6.68
Net income (R billion)	8.36	13.2	5.18	7.09	3.62	5.15	0.88	−2.33	−20.7	−20.8	−18.9
Total debt (R billion)	160.3	182.6	202.9	254.8	297.4	322.7	355.3	388.7	440.6	483.7	401.8
Employee benefit expenses (R billion)	16.7	20.2	23.6	25.6	25.9	29.2	33.1	29.4	33.3	33.2	32.9
Number of employees	41,778	43,473	46,266	46,919	46,490	47,978	47,658	48,628	46,665	44,772	42,749
Electrical output capacity (GWh)	237,430	237,414	232,228	231,129	226,300	238,599	220,166	221,936	218,939	214,968	201,400

In 2018 and 2019 Eskom's negative financial situation became serious as costs started exceeding income and the company started experiencing trouble raising money. For 72 hours between 26 March and 29 March 2019 it was reported that Eskom had run out of funds thereby threatening to negatively impact the broader South African economy. The situation was alleviated once Eskom secured a R3 billion commercial loan which was paid back on 2 April after the Reserve Bank disbursed R5 billion to Eskom through an emergency provision. In July 2019 Eskom announced a loss of R20.7 billion due to the cost of servicing high levels of debt, the increased cost of primary energy and unpaid municipal debts.

==== Debt ====
In late 2016, Standard & Poor's Global Ratings downgraded Eskom's credit rating further into subinvestment grade cutting its long-term credit rating to BB – two levels below the investment threshold. By 2017 increasing levels of debt and corruption scandals affecting the company has led investment bank Goldman Sachs to declare Eskom as being the "biggest risk to South Africa’s economy." The company had R413 billion in debt and planned to raise an additional R340 billion (US$26 billion) by 2022 thereby representing eight percent of South Africa's GDP. R218.2 billion of the company's debt consist of government guarantees. Exacerbating the company's financial situation was a recorded R3 billion worth of irregular expenditures in 2017.

On 28 March 2018 Moody's Investors Service downgraded Eskom's credit rating to B2 from B1 stating that it was concerned with "the lack of any tangible financial support for the company in the February state budget".

On 24 November 2020, Moody's further downgraded Eskom's long-term credit rating to Caa1. This places Eskom's credit within the "speculative grade" of investment, with a "very high credit risk".

Due to the company's large size and important role as the region's primary energy producer President Ramaphosa stated that Eskom was "too big to fail" as the reason why government had to continue to fund it despite its serious financial situation.

In February 2023, with debt sitting at R423 billion, the South African government announced that, subject to approval from existing debt holders, it would be providing support worth R254 billion, including interest payments for the following three years and three capital payments of R78-billion in 2023/24, R66 billion in 2024/25 and R40-billion in 2025/26, with the intention to reduce Eskom's overall debt to R300 billion.

===== Chinese debt =====
In July 2018 it was announced that Eskom had taken out a R33 billion loan from the Chinese government owned China Development Bank. The loan conditions were controversially not made public with accusations that it was an example of debt-trap diplomacy by China. During the Zondo Commission of Inquiry into state corruption a senior Eskom executive stated that an additional R25 billion loan from the China-based company Huarong Energy Africa was improperly and controversially taken out by Eskom. After the loan had been issued Eskom chairperson Jabu Mabuza stated to the Zondo Commission that Eskom would not be repaying the Huarong loan due to irregularities and corruption involved in the issuing of the loan.

== Controversies ==
=== Racism ===
Eskom responds to questions about excluding white males from senior management shortlist

=== Municipal debts ===
A number of South African municipalities are in significant arrears in paying Eskom for electricity supplied to them. The large amount owed to Eskom has caused significant controversy given the state utilities financial difficulties and repeated periods of load-shedding. By January 2020 South African municipalities owed Eskom a total of roughly R43 billion (equivalent to US$2.88 billion). This had increased to R49.1 billion by July 2022.

==== Soweto ====
The single largest South African municipality to owe Eskom for unpaid electricity is the City of Johannesburg Metropolitan Municipality in which Soweto owes R13 billion to R16.4 billion in 2019. In response, Eskom initiated a process of cutting off electricity to debtors in the city, which resulted in violent public protests. The city has a history of non-payment dating back to the 1980s when non-payment was used as a form of non-violent protest against apartheid era policies. This is thought to have cultivated a culture of non-payment.

=== Zimbabwe power exports ===
300 MW of power are exported to Zimbabwe in a deal valued at US$2 million a month. At the end of November 2019 it was revealed that Zimbabwe owed $22 million in debt to Eskom (about 11 months in arrears). Despite statements that Eskom continues to supply Zimbabwe during scheduled blackouts, electricity is only supplied if Eskom does not need it.

=== Power shortage: 2007 - ongoing ===
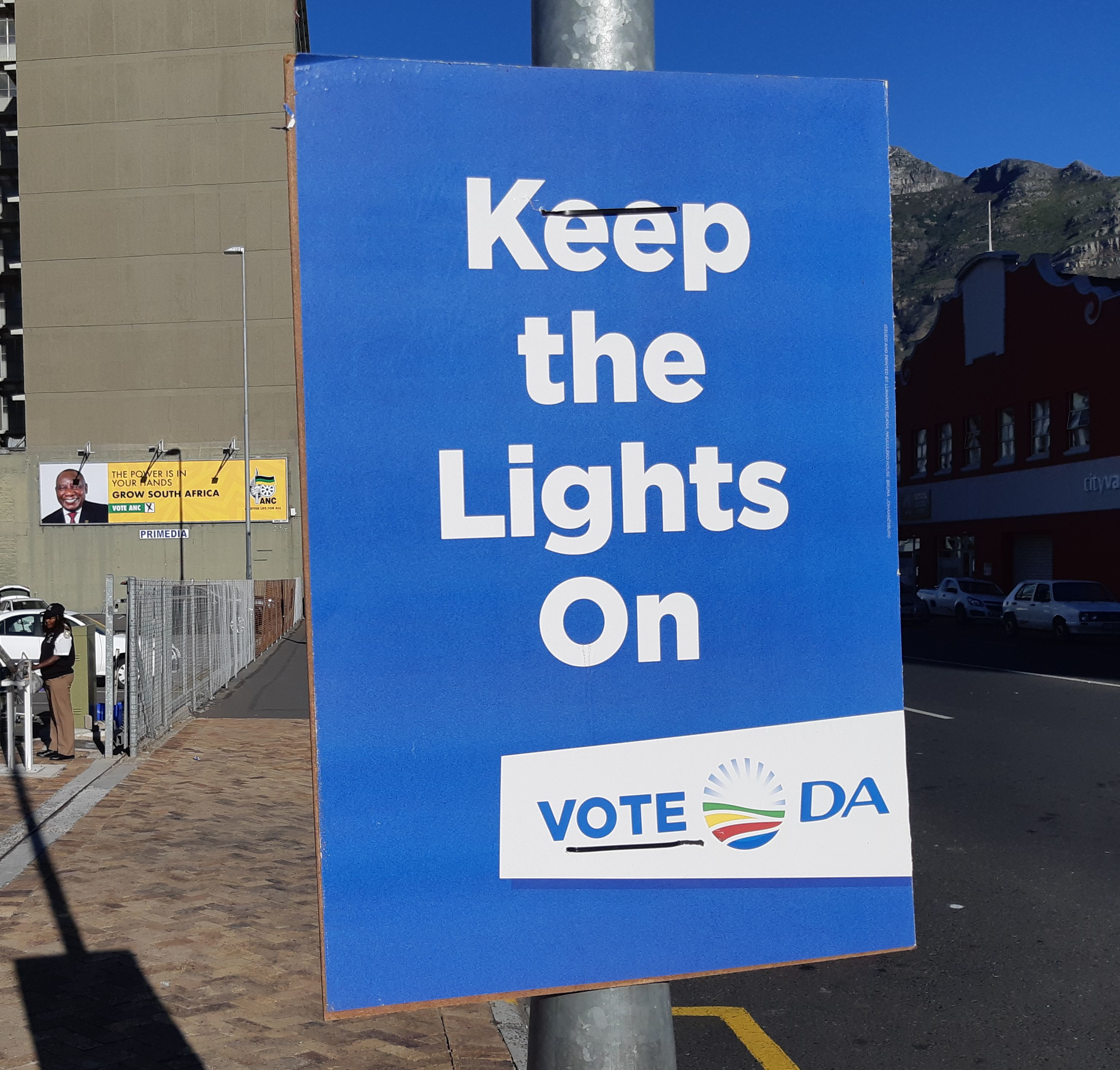
An election poster referring to the Eskom energy crisis in the run up to the 2019 general election

In the later months of 2007, South Africa started experiencing widespread rolling blackouts as supply fell behind demand, threatening to destabilise the national grid. With a reserve margin estimated at 8% or below, such "load shedding" is implemented whenever generating units are taken offline for maintenance, repairs or re-fuelling (in the case of nuclear units).

From February 2008 to November 2014 blackouts were temporarily halted due to reduced demand and maintenance stabilization. This drop in demand was caused by many of the country's mines shutting down or slowing to help alleviate the burden.

Load shedding was reintroduced in early November 2014. The Majuba power plant lost its capacity to generate power after a collapse of one of its coal storage silos on 1 November 2014. The Majuba power plant delivered approximately 10% of the country's entire capacity and the collapse halted the delivery of coal to the plant. A second silo developed a major crack on 20 November causing the shut down of the plant again, this after temporary measures were instituted to deliver coal to the plant.

In 2016, Eskom said that unplanned outages had been reduced. In May 2016, former president Jacob Zuma said assurances had been given to him by Eskom management.

In June 2018, there was Stage 1 load shedding along with a strike over wages.

In February 2019, a new round of load shedding began due to the failure of coal burning boilers at some power stations due to poor quality coal. This resulted in long running periods of level 4 load shedding across the country in mid-March 2019, including night-time load shedding and promised to report back. The situation at Eskom and resulting energy crisis became a political issue during the 2019 South African general elections.

==== Sabotage ====
In December 2019, load shedding reached a new high as Eskom introduced stage 6 load shedding for the first time. Cyril Ramaphosa faced criticism as his departure for Egypt was announced shortly after the move to stage 6. He returned early to address the problem, meeting on 11 December with the Eskom board. Ramaphosa then announced that there had been an element of sabotage involved, leading to the loss of 2000 MW capacity. Ramaphosa faced criticism on social media, with many blaming incompetence rather than sabotage.

On 19 November 2021, Eskom announced that an initial forensic investigation found evidence that recent damage to a coal conveyor at Lethabo was the result of deliberate sabotage. Steel supports had been severed, causing a power supply pylon to collapse. In a media briefing, de Ruyter commented that the matter had been referred to the Hawks for further investigation. In May 2022 the Minister for Public Enterprises, Pravin Gordhan, reported to Parliament that additional incidents of cables being cut intentionally by saboteurs, rising theft at its power plants, and corruption around the supply of fuel oil, had greatly worsened the energy crisis and Eskom's ability to resolve it.

=== Corruption ===
==== 2017 corruption scandal ====
Eskom was forced to suspend its chief financial officer Anoj Singh in July 2017 when the Development Bank of South Africa threatened to recall a R15 billion loan if no action was taken against Eskom officials (including Singh) who were involved in corruption allegations involving the Gupta family. In September 2017, Minister for Public Enterprises, Lynne Brown, instructed Eskom to take legal action against firms and individuals involved; ranging from Gupta family-owned consultancy firm Trillian Capital Partners Ltd. and consultancy firm McKinsey to Anoj Singh and acting chief executive Matshela Koko.

A report compiled by Eskom and G9 Forensic found that the two consulting firms including Gupta owned Trillian made R1.6 billion (US$120 million) in fees with an additional R7.8 billion made from future contracts. An investigation done by the amaBhungane Centre for Investigative Journalism found that the Gupta family had received contracts worth R11.7 billion from Eskom to supply coal between 2014 and 2017. With pressure for Eskom to sign the first coal supply contracts with Gupta-owned entities being applied on the state-owned firm by then President Jacob Zuma.

In 2019, South African Special Investigating Unit launched an investigation into corruption related to the construction of the Medupi and Kusile power stations as a cause of repeated construction delays and project cost increases; this led to the investigation of 11 contractors for allegedly stealing R139 billion (US$9.13 billion) from the projects. In 2019, two senior Eskom managers and two business people were charged with fraud and corruption related to the construction of the Kusile power station.

In January 2020 South African Minister for Public Enterprises, Pravin Gordhan, stated that cost overruns and corruption during the construction of Medupi and Kusile power stations was an important reason for the dramatic increase in Eskom electricity prices.

==== 2019 Deloitte consulting lawsuit ====
In October 2019, Eskom's chairman Jabu Mabuza filed a court affidavit at the Johannesburg High Court to recover R207 million in consulting fees from the consulting firm Deloitte. The affidavit alleged that Eskom executives had improperly awarded two consulting contracts to the consulting firm Deloitte. According to Eskom, in one contract awarded to Deloitte, Deloitte proposed a fee of R88.8-million while the competing bids from other firms were for R14.6-million and R13.3-million. In the other contract, Deloitte's bid was R79.1-million, while the other bids were for R16-million and R9.1-million.

In March 2020, Deloitte agreed to pay back R150 million of the R207 million sought by Eskom. However, in a joint statement, it denied being part of any corruption, and that they acknowledged that there were technical irregularities in the process of awarding the contracts.

In April 2020, Deloitte told AmaBhungane that the managing director for Deloitte Africa's advisory division Thiru Pillay and the lead consultant on the Eskom contract Shamal Sivasanker had resigned effective 31 March 2020 for their roles in the Eskom event.

In November 2021, Eskom announced that it had appointed Deloitte as its next external auditor, as its contract with Grant Thornton was expiring at the end of that month.

==== 2023 de Ruyter interview ====
"I didn't exactly make a secret of my view that load shedding is, to a large extent, attributable to crime and corruption"

— André de Ruyter

In late February 2023 then Eskom CEO André de Ruyter gave a controversial interview with E.tv during which he stated that Eskom was losing roughly R1 billion (US$53.9 million) a month due to theft and corruption. De Ruyter attributed this to the presence within Eskom of four criminal syndicates and went on to state that a senior - although unnamed - ANC MP was involved and that government did not have the political will to resolve the situation.

This resulted in de Ruyter's immediate resignation on 22 February 2023 from his position as CEO amidst criticism from the ANC. The Daily Maverick quoted an intelligence report that named the four criminal syndicates within Eskom as "the Presidential Cartel, the Mesh-Kings Cartel, the Legendaries Cartel and the Chief Cartel."

=== Price increases ===
South African cents per kWh of electricity, 1994 to 2020. The South African energy crisis begin in 2007. View source data.

Eskom took out a number of loans to construct the additional capacity and significantly increased electrical tariffs by an average of 22% a year between 2007 and 2015 to in an attempt to offset costs. In 2019 Eskom controversially applied to the National Energy Regulator of South Africa (NERSA) to increase tariffs by an additional 45% over the proceeding three years arguing that it needs the increase in revenue to avoid a debt induced death spiral.

Eskom was controversially granted a 13.8% increase by NERSA in March 2019. The South African civil society Organisation Undoing Tax Abuse (OUTA) stated that by 2019 Eskom's electrical tariffs had increased by 500% over the previous 11 years. Pietermaritzburg Economic Justice and Dignity stated that the increased tariffs will exacerbate urban poverty negating increases to South Africa's basic income grant.

Eskom have again applied to NERSA for an urgent 17% increase in tariffs for 2019/2020 in an attempt to make up a R27.323 billion shortfall, Eskom is citing lower returns due to lower sales volumes as main reason for needing this price hike. The lower sales volumes is directly related to load shedding and Eskom's failure to maintain capacity. The price hike application is open for public participation until 20 January 2020.

NERSA opposed an Eskom application to receive an additional R69 billion government bailout whilst Eskom challenged NERSA's denial of an additional price increase for 2020/21 of 16%, instead of the 8.1% price increase already approved by NERSA. During court proceedings with NERSA Eskom stated that this finances might collapse triggering a debt crisis for the South African government that has guaranteed Eskom's debt. Public Enterprises Minister Pravin Gordhan has stated that corruption and cost overruns during the construction of Medupi and Kusile power stations has resulted in a fourfold increase in electricity prices.

An additional increase of 20.5% was approved by NERSA and announced by Eskom to take effect from 1 April 2022. This price raise was criticized by the Mayor of Cape Town, Geordin Hill-Lewis, as being damaging to the economy, and he requested that it not be implemented. Eskom has a proposal before the National Energy Regulator of South Africa (Nersa) to hike electricity prices by a rumoured 44% for the 2024/2025 financial year The state-owned enterprise has applied for total revenues of R446bn for the 2026 financial year, R495bn for the 2027 financial year and R537bn for the 2028 financial year.

== See also ==
- Cahora Bassa (HVDC)
- Eskom Centre
- XMLVend
- Hendrik van der Bijl – founder and first chairman of ESCOM (Eskom)
- South African energy crisis
