= Jabu Mabuza =

South African businessperson (1958–2021)

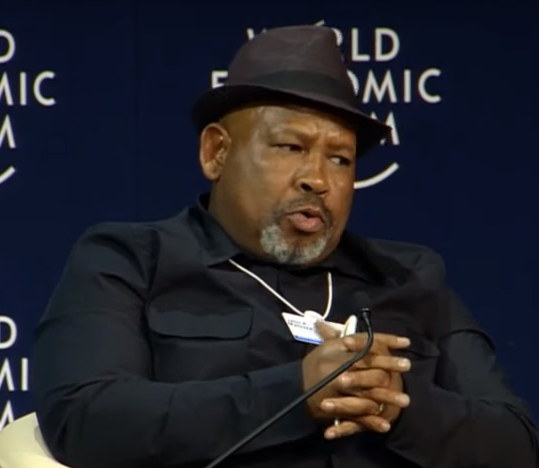
- Jabu Mabuza at the World Economic Forum
- Born: Jabulane Mabuza; 4 February 1958; Waterval Boven, Mpumalanga, South Africa
- Died: 16 June 2021 (aged 63)
- Occupations: Businessperson, investor
- Years active: 1980–2021

Jabu Mabuza (4 February 1958 – 16 June 2021) was a South African businessman and investor. He was chairman of the Eskom board from January 2018, until he resigned in January 2020.

== Early life and education ==
Jabulane Mabuza was born in February 1958 in the town of Waterval Boven, South Africa. His family was later forcibly resettled in White River on trust land, and Mabuza lived alternatively with his two grandmothers. He later went to live with an aunt in Daveyton. While in junior secondary school, Mabuza was expelled for being caught in the 1976 student protests in Soweto. He graduated in Durban and from 1981 until 1982 attended the University of Limpopo.

== Career ==
In 1980 he became a clerk of the court at what was then called the Department of Bantu Affairs. He began driving taxis for tuition funds while in Daveyton, later becoming a taxi owner. Also in the late 1980s he helped found the Foundation for African Business and Consumer Services, becoming the organization's CEO in 1990.

Mabuza was the group CEO of Tsogo Sun Holding.

On 20 January 2018, South Africa's President Cyril Ramaphosa appointed Mabuza as the new chairman of Eskom, a state-owned power utility company.

On 29 July 2019, Mabuza was appointed Acting CEO of ESKOM, replacing the resigned Phakamani Hadebe at the struggling State Energy utility.

== Personal life ==
Mabuza met his future wife, Siphiwe, in the 1970s while on a train to Durban. They had three children. He died of COVID-19 on 16 June 2021, aged 63.

Preceded by Zethembe Khoza	Chairperson of Eskom Board; 2018–2021	Succeeded by
