= Government of South Africa =

South African Government
- Coat of Arms

Overview
- Established: 31 May 1910; 116 years ago
- State: South Africa
- Leader: President (Cyril Ramaphosa)
- Appointed by: National Assembly of South Africa
- Main organ: Cabinet of South Africa
- Ministries: 32
- Responsible to: Parliament of South Africa
- Annual budget: R2.67 trillion (2026–27)
- Headquarters: Union Buildings, Pretoria
- Website: www.gov.za

The Government of South Africa, or South African Government, is the national government of the Republic of South Africa, a parliamentary republic with a three-tier system of government and an independent judiciary, operating in a parliamentary system. Legislative authority is held by the Parliament of South Africa. Executive authority is vested in the President of South Africa who is head of state and head of government, and their Cabinet. The President is elected by the Parliament to serve a fixed term.

South Africa's government differs from those of other Commonwealth nations. The national, provincial, and local levels of government all have legislative and executive authority in their own spheres, and are defined in the South African Constitution as "distinctive, interdependent, and interrelated".

Operating at both national and provincial levels ("domes") are advisory bodies drawn from South Africa's traditional leaders. It is a stated intention in the Constitution that the country be run on a system of cooperative governance. Ensuring the effectiveness of this system is within the mandate of the Department of Cooperative Governance.

The national government is composed of three inter-connected branches. The first is the legislature, encompassing Parliament, which consists of the National Assembly and the National Council of Provinces) with a combined 490 Members of Parliament. The second is the executive, which pertains to the President, who is both Head of State and Head of Government). The third is the judiciary, relating to the Constitutional Court, the Supreme Court of Appeal, and the High Court).

All bodies of the South African Government are subject to the rule of the Constitution, which is the supreme law in South Africa.

== Legislative ==
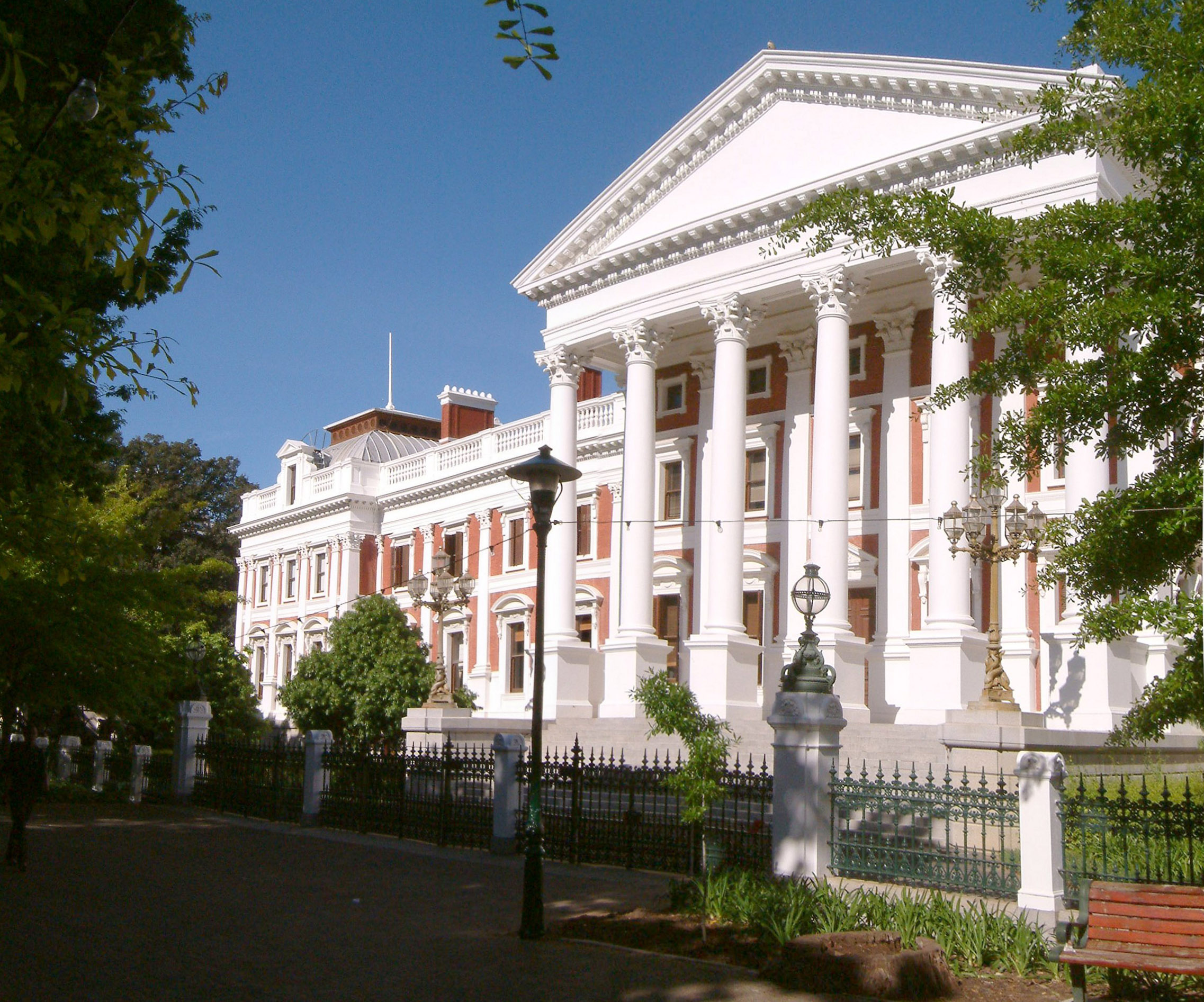
The Houses of Parliament in Cape Town.

The Parliament of the Republic of South Africa is South Africa's legislature. It is located in Cape Town; the country's legislative capital.

Under the present Constitution of South Africa, the bicameral Parliament comprises a National Assembly and a National Council of Provinces. Individuals serving in both houses use the term Member of Parliament (MP).

The current, twenty-eighth Parliament was first convened on 14 June 2024.

From 1910 to 1994, members of Parliament were elected chiefly by the South African white minority. The first elections with universal suffrage were held in 1994.

Both chambers held their meetings in the Houses of Parliament, Cape Town that were built 1875–1884. A fire broke out within the buildings in early January 2022, destroying the session room of the National Assembly. It was decided that, during construction work at Parliament, the National Assembly would temporarily meet at the Good Hope Chamber. The rebuild project has a target completion date of June 2027, and a goal of hosting that year's SONA.

== Executive ==
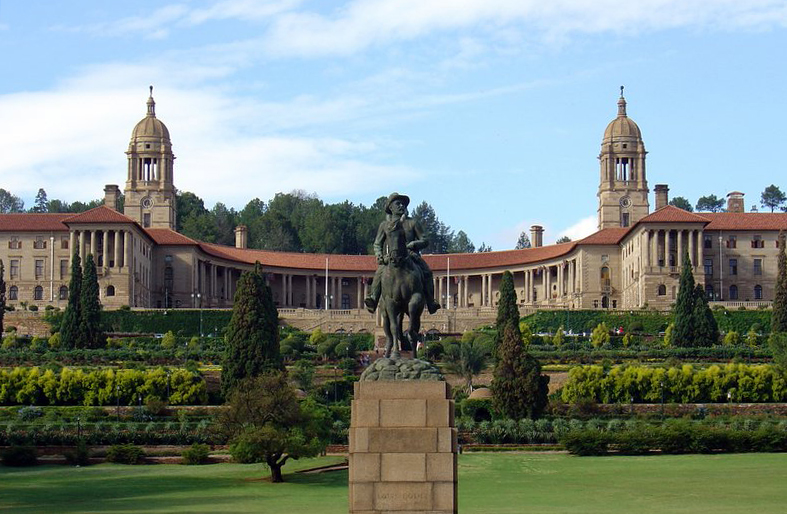
The Union Buildings, the seat of the national executive

The President, Deputy President and the Ministers of the South African Government make up the executive branch of the national government. Ministers are Members of Parliament who are appointed by the President to head the various departments of the national government. The president is elected by parliament from its members.

== Judicial ==
The third branch of the national government is an independent judiciary. The judicial branch interprets the laws, using as a basis the laws as enacted and explanatory statements made in the Legislature during the enactment. The legal system is based on Roman-Dutch law and English common law and accepts compulsory ICJ jurisdiction, with reservations. The constitution's bill of rights provides for due process including the right to a fair, public trial within a reasonable time.

- Magistrates' Courts – The court where civil cases involving less than R100 000, cases.

== Provincial government ==
The nine provinces of South Africa are governed by provincial governments which form the second layer of government, between the national government and the municipalities. The provincial governments are established, and their structure defined, by Chapter Six of the Constitution of South Africa.

The provincial governments are structured according to a parliamentary system in which the executive is dependent on and accountable to the legislature. In each province the provincial legislature is directly elected by proportional representation, and the legislature in turn elects one of its members as Premier to head the executive. The Premier appoints an Executive Council (a cabinet), consisting of members of the legislature, to administer the various departments of the provincial administration.

The powers of the provincial governments are circumscribed by the national constitution, which limits them to certain listed "functional areas". In some areas the provincial governments' powers are concurrent with those of the national government, while in other areas the provincial governments have exclusive powers. The constitution prescribes a principle of "co-operative government" whereby the various layers of government must co-ordinate their actions and legislation; it also lays down a series of rules for resolving conflicts between national and provincial legislation.

== Local government ==
Local government in South Africa consists of municipalities of various types. The largest metropolitan areas are governed by metropolitan municipalities, while the rest of the country is divided into district municipalities, each of which consists of several local municipalities.

As of 2026, there are eight metropolitan municipalities, 44 district municipalities, and 205 local municipalities, for a total of 257.

Municipalities are governed by municipal councils which are elected every five years. The councils of metropolitan and local municipalities are elected by a system of mixed-member proportional representation, while the councils of district municipalities are partly elected by proportional representation and partly appointed by the councils of the constituent local municipalities.

== Opposition ==
In each legislative body, the party or coalition of parties holding a majority of seats forms the government. The largest party not in the government is recognized as the Official Opposition, and is headed by the Leader of the Opposition.

A Shadow Cabinet is traditionally formed by the opposition. An example is the previous Shadow Cabinet of John Steenhuisen. The Shadow Cabinet consists of MPs with shadow portfolios, referred to as Shadow Ministers, whose job it is to scrutinize their corresponding office holders (Ministers) in the Cabinet, and develop alternative policies for their respective portfolios. It is assumed that should the official opposition party form government, those Shadow Ministers would become Ministers of their respective portfolios.
