= Parliament of South Africa =

Bicameral legislature of South Africa

Coordinates: 33.9258°S 18.4197°E

Parliament of the Republic of South Africa List: 10 other official names: Parlement van Suid-Afrika (Afrikaans); iPalamende yeSewula Afrika (Southern Ndebele); iPalamente yoMzantsi Afrika (Xhosa); iPhalamende yaseNingizimu Afrika (Zulu); iPhalamende yeNingizimu Afrika (Swazi); Palamente ya Afrika-Borwa (Northern Sotho); Palamente ya Afrika Borwa (Sotho); Palamente ya Aforika Borwa (Tswana); Palamende ra Afrika Dzonga (Tsonga); Phaḽamennde ya Afurika Tshipembe (Venda)
- 28th Parliament
- Coat of arms of the Parliament of South Africa

- Logo of Parliament

Type
- Type: Bicameral
- Houses: National Assembly; National Council of Provinces

History
- Founded: 31 May 1910 (116 years, 101 days)

Leadership
- Speaker of the National Assembly: Thoko Didiza, ANC since 14 June 2024
- Chairperson of the National Council of Provinces: Refilwe Mtsweni-Tsipane, ANC since 15 June 2024

Structure
- Seats: 490 MPs; 90 National Council; 400 National Assembly
- National Council of Provinces political groups: ANC (24 + 19); DA (12 + 9); EFF (8 + 2); MK (5 + 4); VF+ (2 + 0); IFP (1 + 1); PA (1 + 1); UDM (1 + 0); ActionSA (0 + 1)
- National Assembly political groups: Government (287); ANC (159); DA (87); IFP (17); PA (9); VF+ (6); UDM (3); RISE (2); Al Jama-ah (2); Good (1); PAC (1); Opposition (113); Progressive Caucus (100); MK (58); EFF (39); ATM (2); UAT (1); Other Parties (13); ActionSA (6); ACDP (3); BOSA (2); NCC (2)

Meeting place
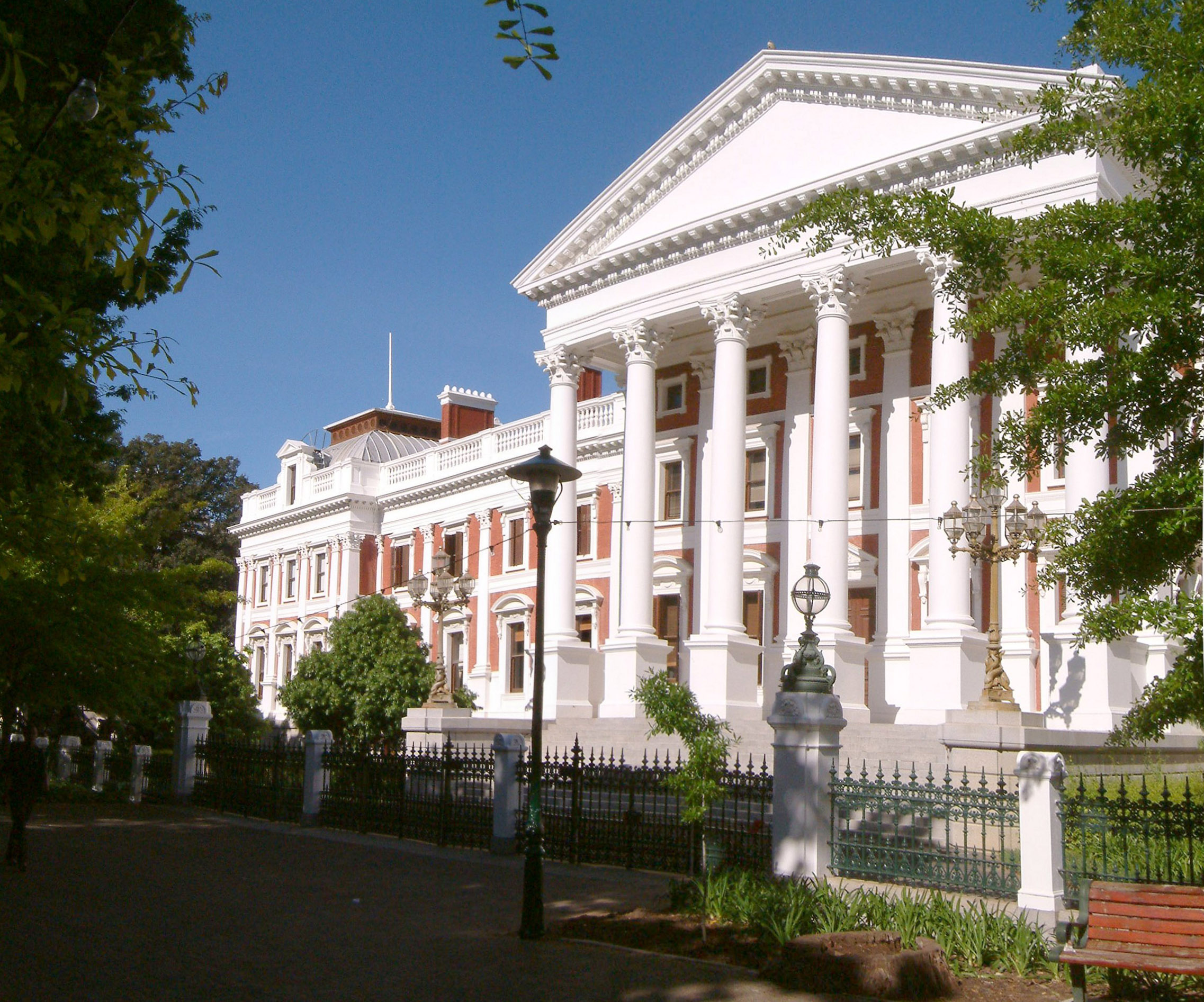
- Houses of Parliament, Cape Town; Western Cape, South Africa

Website
- www.parliament.gov.za

The Parliament of the Republic of South Africa is South Africa's legislature. It is located in Cape Town; the country's legislative capital.

Under the present Constitution of South Africa, the bicameral Parliament comprises a National Assembly and a National Council of Provinces. Individuals serving in both houses use the term Member of Parliament (MP).

The current, twenty-eighth Parliament was first convened on 14 June 2024.

From 1910 to 1994, members of Parliament were elected chiefly by the South African white minority. The first elections with universal suffrage were held in 1994.

Both chambers held their meetings in the Houses of Parliament, Cape Town that were built 1875–1884. A fire broke out within the buildings in early January 2022, destroying the session room of the National Assembly. It was decided that, during construction work at Parliament, the National Assembly would temporarily meet at the Good Hope Chamber. The rebuild project has a target completion date of June 2027, and a goal of hosting that year's SONA.

== Major political parties in parliament ==
African National Congress
The ANC was founded in 1912, but were banned by State President Charles Robberts Swart in 1960, remaining so until the ban was lifted thirty years later by President F. W. De Klerk. The ANC became the leading political party in South Africa after the first multi-racial election in 1994. The party's main platform, which is based on a social democratic ideology, rests on working towards racial equality and eradicating the socio-economic classes which are often based on race. The ANC has been considered a party for native South Africans, especially before 2009 when party leader Jacob Zuma faced multiple accusations regarding corruption, particularly using public funds for his own purposes. The economic difficulties in South Africa, as well as police brutality have both been blamed on the ANC. Currently, the ANC holds 230 seats in parliament. Support for the ANC went down between the 2014 and the 2019 general elections, with violent protests erupting all over the country in response to the allegations of corruption within the ANC and the non-delivery of municipal services.
Democratic Alliance
The DA was formed when the New National Party, the successor to the apartheid-era National Party, merged with the Democratic Party and the Federal Alliance in 2000 to form an alliance. The DA is an opposition party and has been traditionally supported by South Africa's minority communities (White, Coloured and Indian). In more recent years, the party has attempted to win votes from Black South Africans and as a result, Black support for the DA has risen over the past several years, going from 1% to 6%. The DA is a liberal party that favours free-market policies. The DA was allotted 89 seats in parliament after the 2014 general election, but the party's seat total decreased to 84 seats following the 2019 general election. The DA has been part of the government of South Africa since the 2024 general election, having joined the Government of National Unity (GNU), and President Cyril Ramaphosa's Third Cabinet. The DA stated that one of its main aims for joining the GNU was keeping rival parties EFF and MK out of the government; a goal which was achieved as per the eventual composition of the GNU. As of May 2025, the party holds 6 ministry seats, and 6 deputy ministry seats in parliament.
Economic Freedom Fighters
The EFF emerged eight months before the 2014 general election and won 25 seats in parliament. After the 2019 general elections, the EFF increased their seats in parliament to 44, the only party of the top three parties that achieved an increase of members in parliament. The EFF is a far-left revolutionary socialist political party, advocating for land expropriation and for an end to corruption within parliament.
Inkatha Freedom Party
The IFP, which was formed in 1990 was the successor to the former government in the now-defunct Kwazulu Bantustan, traditionally draws its support from the Zulu people. It has however made inroads into the minority electorate of Whites and Indians. The IFP was the third-largest party until it was unseated by the EFF and is one of the few parties to have consecutive representation in parliament since democracy in 1994. The IFP apart from the ANC was part of the National Government for 10 years. The IFP champions the rights of traditional leaders and advocates for policies which favour free markets. The party is opposed to socialism and communist policies. Because the ANC had such a large majority in parliament, smaller parties are constantly forming alliances and coalitions in order to act as a stronger opposition to the ANC-run legislative and executive branches. In the 2024 South African general election, support for the ruling African National Congress (ANC) significantly declined; the ANC remained the largest party but lost the parliamentary majority that it had held since the inaugural post-apartheid election in 1994. The centrist Democratic Alliance (DA) remained in second place with a slight increase.
uMkhonto we Sizwe (MK)
A left-wing populist party founded 6 months prior to the 2024 election and led by former president Jacob Zuma came in third place. Most of the ANC's loss of support flowed into the MK, while the DA saw some gains, and the EFF lost some support (and its status as the third-largest party in parliament).

== Seat of Parliament ==
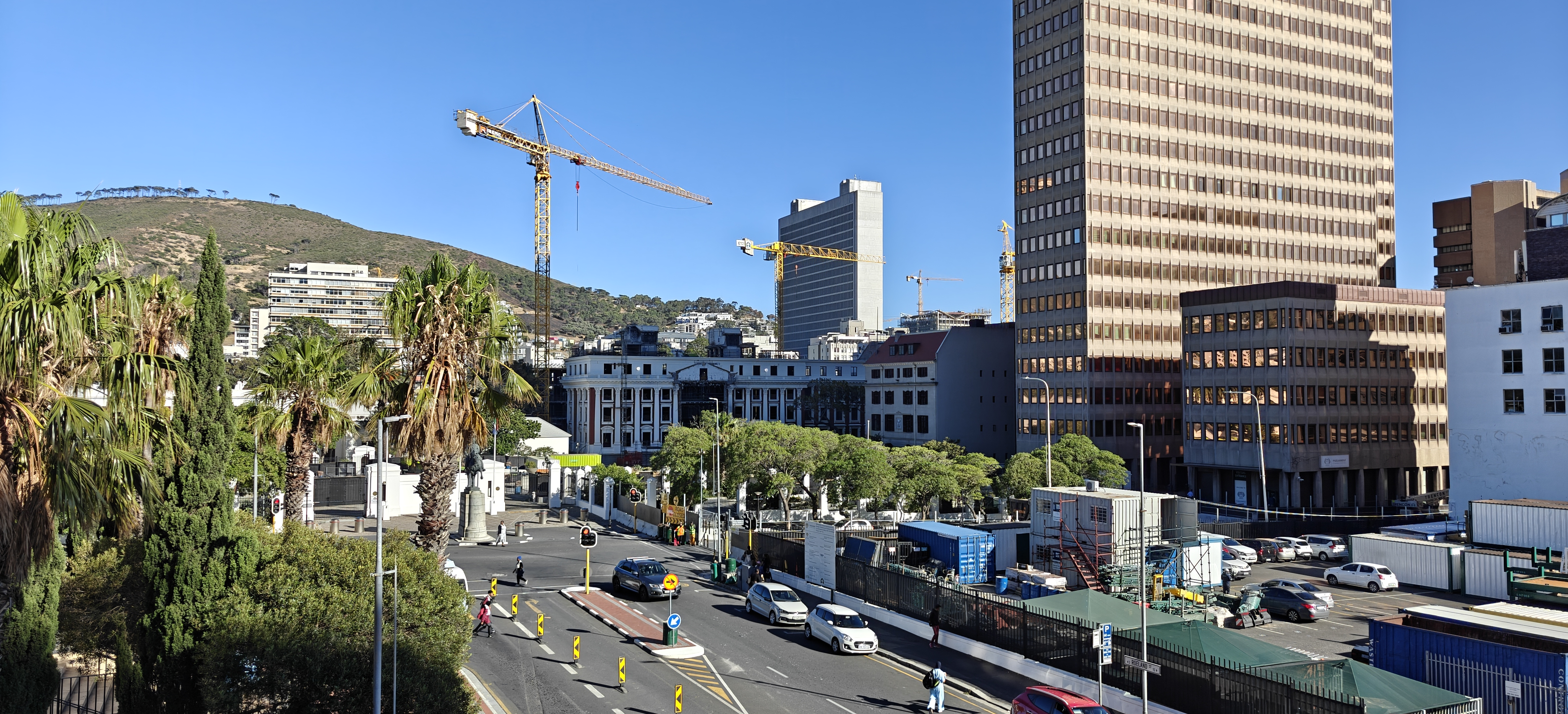
Houses of Parliament undergoing renovations in January 2026

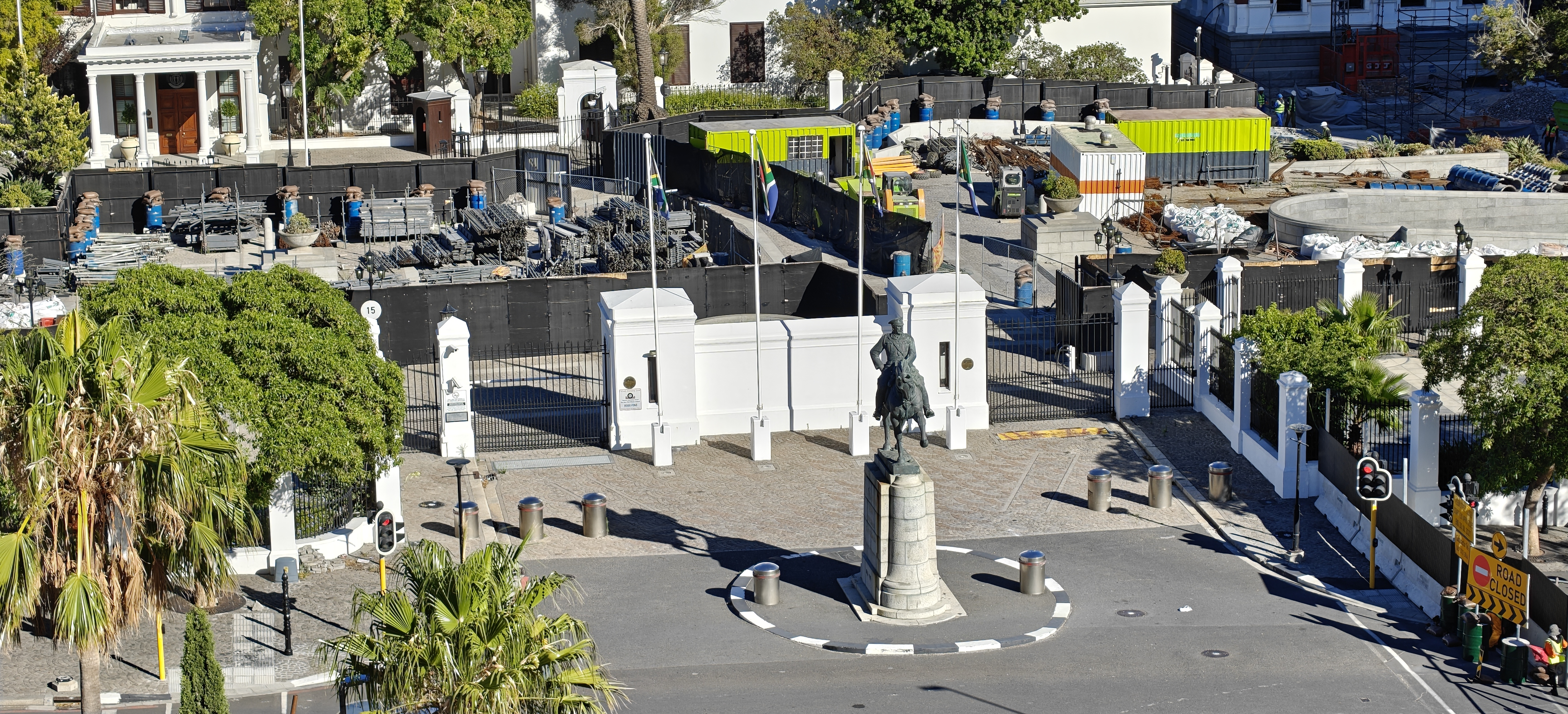
Main street entrance to Parliament, at the top of Roeland Street, Cape Town CBD

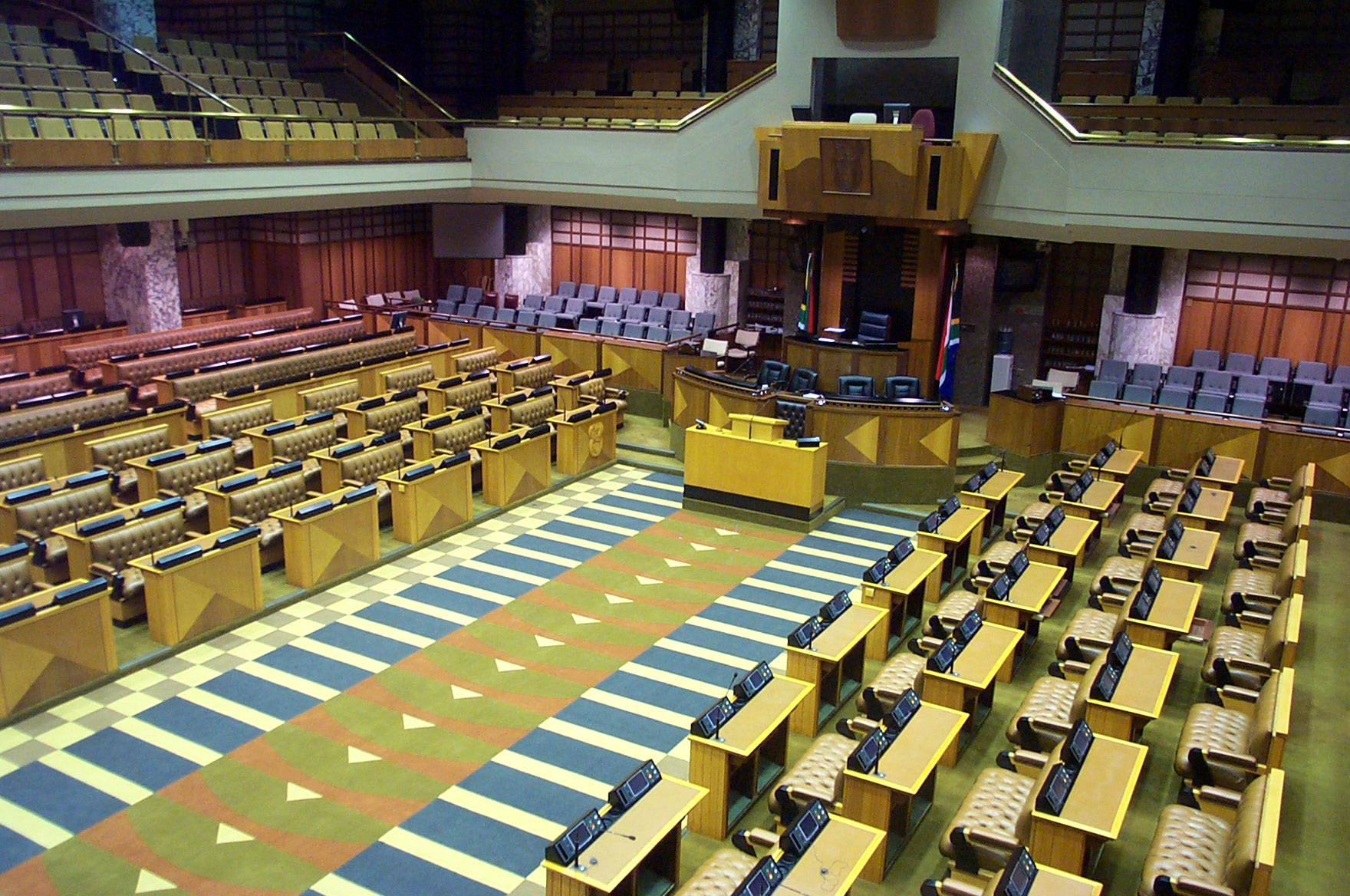
The chamber of the National Assembly prior to the January 2022 fire

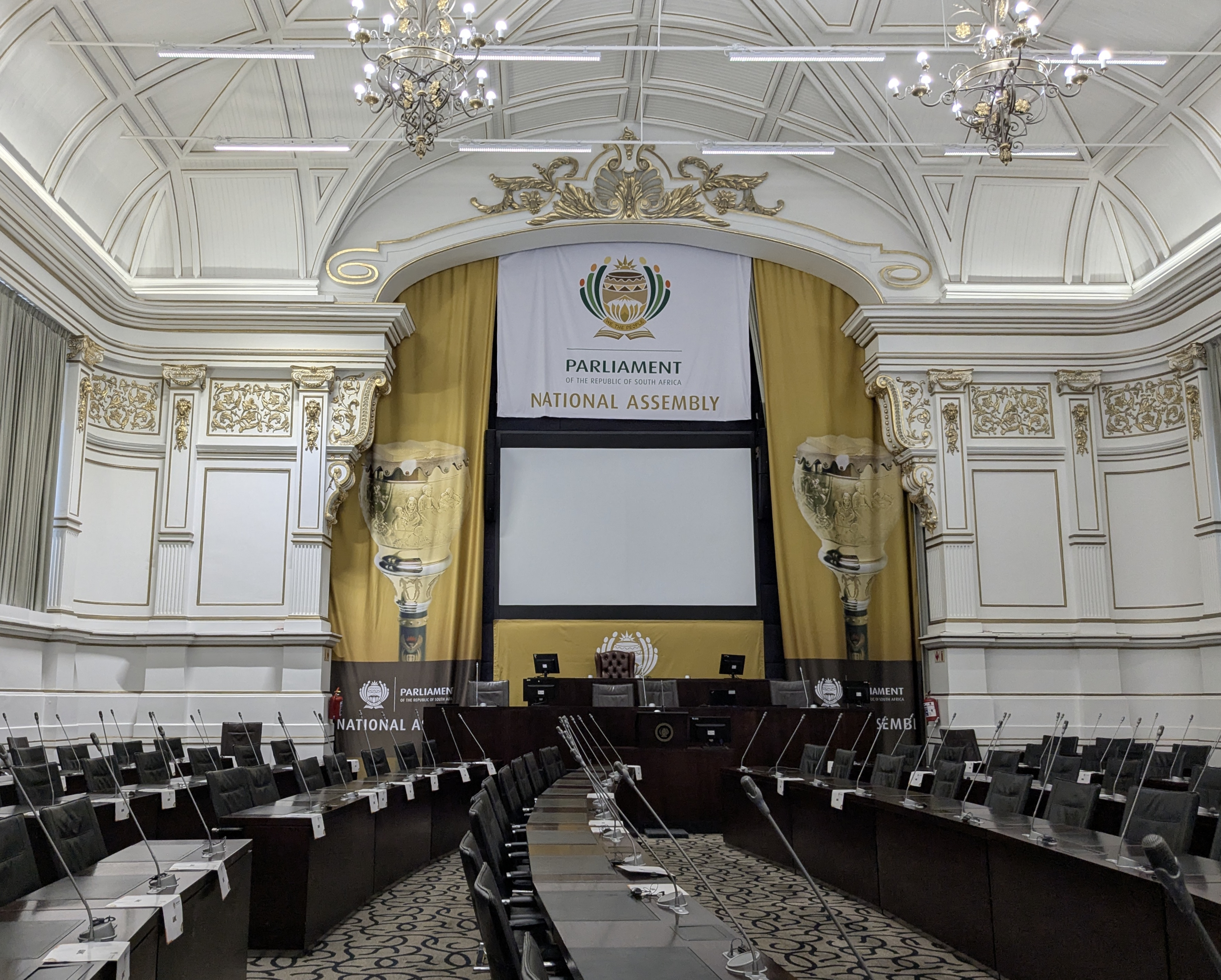
The Good Hope Chamber in Cape Town, in use temporarily by the National Assembly as a meeting place, while the Houses of Parliament undergo renovations

Parliament sits at the Houses of Parliament, Cape Town, even though the seat of government is in Pretoria. This dates back to the foundation of the Union, when there was disagreement among the four provinces as to which city would be the national capital.

As a compromise, Cape Town was designated the legislative capital, Bloemfontein the judicial capital, and Pretoria the administrative capital. The African National Congress (ANC) government has proposed moving Parliament to Pretoria, arguing that the present arrangement is cumbersome as ministers, civil servants and diplomats must move back and forth when Parliament is in session.

However, many Capetonians have spoken out against such a move, accusing the ANC of trying to centralise power. Under the Constitution, there is provision for Parliament to sit elsewhere than Cape Town on grounds of public interest, security or convenience and Parliament is permitted to provide in its rules and orders for sittings outside Cape Town.

Rule 24 of the National Assembly Rules accordingly allows the Speaker to direct that the House will sit at 'a place other than the Houses of Parliament in Cape Town' after consulting the Leader of the House and the Chief Whip of each party represented in the House. Rule 23 of the rules of the National Council of Provinces allows the council to pass a resolution providing for it to sit elsewhere.

In 2018, the Government of South Africa formed a project steering committee to conduct a feasibility study into moving parliament to Pretoria and to identify potential sites for a new parliament building. In April 2019, the Minister of Public Works announced that a list of potential sites had been drawn up. In 2020, it was suggested that moving parliament to Pretoria would save R650 million per year.

In January 2022, a fire broke out at the Houses of Parliament building in Cape Town causing severe damage to the session rooms of both the National Council of Provinces and the National Assembly. The 2022 State of the Nation Address was held at Cape Town City Hall and subsequent meetings of the National Assembly will be held at the Good Hope Chamber.

The Good Hope Chamber has previously been used for committee meetings of the National Assembly and has a seating capacity of 170, reduced to 70 during COVID-19 precautions. The National Assembly has 400 members.

Subsequently, to enable a more permanent venue during the rebuild of the Houses of Parliament, Minister of Public Works and Infrastructure Dean Macpherson oversaw major enhancements of the existing Nieuwmeester Dome, which were installed to suit Parliamentary sittings. The dome was built over a parking lot in Roeland Street, close to the Houses of Parliament. It served as the site of the 2026 State of the Nation debates.

In February 2026, Secretary to Parliament Xolile George announced that the Parliamentary rebuild would be completed in December 2026.

== History ==
=== Before 1910 ===
The predecessor of the Parliament of South Africa, before the 1910 Union of South Africa, was the bicameral Parliament of the Cape of Good Hope. This was composed of the House of Assembly (the lower house) and the Legislative Council (the upper house).

This predecessor dated back to the beginnings of Cape independence in 1853 and was elected according to the multi-racial Cape Qualified Franchise system, whereby suffrage qualifications were applied equally to all males, regardless of race.

The buildings of the Cape Parliament went on to house the Parliament of South Africa, after union.

=== 1910–1961 ===
When the Union of South Africa was established in 1910, the Parliament was bicameral and consisted of the King or the Queen, the Senate, and the House of Assembly (known in Afrikaans as the Volksraad).

- The King (from 1952, the Queen of South Africa) was represented by the Governor-General.
- The Senate consisted of senators nominated by the four provinces, and by the Governor-General, initially for a period of ten years. The number of senators was changed from time to time. The Senate was chaired by a President of the Senate chosen by the senators from among themselves.
- The House of Assembly consisted of members who were directly elected by the voters. Each MP represented an electoral district (constituency), and most of them were elected on the basis of their political party. The number of constituencies and parliamentary seats was increased from time to time, in line with increases in the population. The House was chaired by a Speaker chosen by the MPs from among themselves.
- Only white men could be senators or MPs.
- The franchise (right to vote) was originally granted to white men in all four provinces, to black men in the Cape Province and Natal, and to Coloured men in the Cape Province – in all cases, the minimum age was 21 years.

The composition of Parliament was changed by constitutional amendments from time to time:

- From 1930, white women had the vote, and the right to serve as senators and MPs, on the same basis as white men.
- In 1934, Parliament was declared "the sovereign legislative power in and over the Union".
- From 1937, black voters were separated from the other races – in the Senate they were represented by four elected senators (two for the Cape, one for Natal, one for the Orange Free State and Transvaal), and in the House of Assembly by three "native representative" MPs elected in separate black constituencies.
- From 1950, white voters in South West Africa, which was under South African administration at that time, were represented by four senators and six MPs.
- From 1957, Coloured voters were separated from the whites – in the Senate, they were represented by separate senators, and in the House of Assembly by MPs elected in separate Coloured constituencies. To pass this amendment in the face of strong opposition (and two Supreme Court rulings), prime minister Johannes Strijdom had to enlarge the Senate and appoint enough pro-government senators to get the two-thirds majority he needed to force through the constitutional change.
- Representation of black voters was ended in 1960.
- Voting age was lowered from 21 to 18 in 1960.

In a referendum held in 1960, a small majority of white voters approved the conversion of the country from a constitutional monarchy to a parliamentary republic.

=== 1961–1984 ===
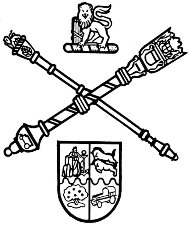
Coat of arms of the Parliament of South Africa 1964–2007

The Republic of South Africa was established in 1961. The only change made to the composition of the Parliament was the substitution of the State President for the Queen. A few significant changes were made later:

- Coloured representation was ended in 1968, leaving both the Senate and the House of Assembly representing white voters only.
- South West Africa ceased to be represented in Parliament from 1977, following the passing of the South West Africa Constitution Amendment Act of that year.
- The Senate was abolished with effect from 1 January 1981, changing Parliament to a unicameral legislature.

=== 1984–1994 ===
A new Constitution, introduced in 1984, re-enfranchised the Coloured population (women as well as men) and enfranchised the Indian population. It retained the existing House of Assembly for whites and established a House of Representatives to represent the Coloureds, and a House of Delegates for the Indians, making Parliament a tricameral legislature. Blacks continued to be excluded.

- Each house consisted of members elected to represent constituencies, plus a few additional members elected by the MPs, and some nominated by the State President.
- Each house legislated on "own affairs" exclusive to its own race group, and they legislated jointly on "general affairs" affecting all races. In practice, the House of Assembly, which had more MPs than the other two houses combined, continued to dominate the legislature.
- Each house was chaired by a chairman elected by its members from among themselves. They were coordinated by a Speaker of Parliament, elected by the members of all three houses in a joint sitting.
- The existing House of Assembly, elected in 1981, was deemed to have been re-elected in 1984, to coordinate its term of office with those of the two new houses. However, this was later overturned by the Supreme Court, and a separate election had to be held for the House of Assembly in 1987. The House elected in 1987 was then dissolved with the other houses in 1989.

The black majority were still disfranchised, and the new system lacked legitimacy even among the Coloureds and Asians, many of whom boycotted elections. In a referendum held in 1992, 68.73% of (only white) voters approved the reform process that effectively ended Apartheid.

In late 1993, one of the last pieces of legislation passed by the tricameral Parliament was the Interim Constitution, which took effect on 27 April 1994, the same day as the first non-racial elections.

=== Since 1994 ===
A new interim constitution, introduced in 1994 after four years of negotiation, finally introduced all-race democracy and enfranchised men and women of all races on equal terms, the minimum age remaining 18 years. Parliament was reconstituted to consist of a Senate and a National Assembly.

- The Senate consisted of 90 senators, ten nominated by each of the nine provinces. It was chaired by a President of the Senate elected by the senators from among themselves.
- The National Assembly consists of 400 members, elected by voters on a proportional representation/party list system. There are no electoral districts, and each party is allocated a number of seats proportionate to the percentage of the votes it receives across the country. It is chaired by a Speaker elected by the MPs from among themselves.
- In 1997, the current Constitution of South Africa came into force, in which the Senate was replaced by a 90-member National Council of Provinces (NCOP), made up of a 10-member delegation from each province (six delegates elected by the provincial legislature, the Premier and three other members of the provincial legislature). The NCOP is chaired by a Chairperson elected by the members from among themselves.

The parliamentary system uses proportional representation, with voters voting for political parties rather than for candidates. Proportional representation allows for smaller parties to have a chance of acquiring seats in parliament, although these parties often combine in order to have a stronger voice within the political system, especially against the ANC.

The Electoral Commission of South Africa is charged with keeping elections fair, regular, and equal. Parties submit closed lists of candidates to the IEC, and the IEC fills the seats allotted to individual parties using the candidate lists after election results come in. The electoral system has seen little corruption since 1994.

International Relations Minister and Cooperation Naledi Pandor has noted that during her term (starting 1994) a decline in political respectability had occurred in parliament, due to its members not engaging with one another in a courteous manner. She remarked that she felt undignified to be an observer of the crude behaviour, which also inhibited the conduct of successful politics.

=== 2022 fire ===
On 2 January 2022, large parts of the Old Assembly Building and National Assembly building were damaged in a fire. A man was arrested and subsequently charged with arson.

=== Rebuild ===
In 2022, the Development Bank of Southern Africa (DBSA) was appointed to lead a rebuild of the parliament buildings. An initial estimate of R2.2 billion for the rebuild in 2024 ballooned to R4.6 billion in 2025. The rebuild includes the 1983 National Assembly building, the Old Assembly Building, and the 90 Plein Street offices.

In August 2026, members of the Joint Standing Committee on the Financial Management of Parliament visited Parliament's construction site to assess the rebuild's progress. During a committee meeting, it was noted that the project was still within budget, with R2.43 billion of the total R4.68 billion having been spent so far. The rebuild was on track to finish by its target date of June 2027, before that year's SONA. According to the project's implementing agent, the Development Bank of Southern Africa (DBSA), construction of the new National Assembly building was 76% complete at the time.

== List of Parliaments ==
=== Parliaments of the Union ===
- 1st South African Parliament (1910–1915) – majority party: South African Party
- 2nd South African Parliament (1915–1920) – majority party: South African Party
- 3rd South African Parliament (1920–1921) – majority party: South African Party
- 4th South African Parliament (1921–1924) – majority party: South African Party
- 5th South African Parliament (1924–1929) – majority party: National Party
- 6th South African Parliament (1929–1933) – majority party: National Party
- 7th South African Parliament (1933–1938) – majority party: United Party
- 8th South African Parliament (1938–1943) – majority party: United Party
- 9th South African Parliament (1943–1948) – majority party: United Party
- 10th South African Parliament (1948–1953) – majority party: National Party
- 11th South African Parliament (1953–1958) – majority party: National Party
- 12th South African Parliament (1958–1961) – majority party: National Party

=== Parliaments of the Republic ===
- 13th South African Parliament (1961–1966) – majority party: National Party
- 14th South African Parliament (1966–1970) – majority party: National Party
- 15th South African Parliament (1970–1974) – majority party: National Party
- 16th South African Parliament (1974–1977) – majority party: National Party
- 17th South African Parliament (1977–1981) – majority party: National Party
- 18th South African Parliament (1981–1984) – majority party: National Party
- 19th South African Parliament (1984–1987) – majority party: National Party
- 20th South African Parliament (1987–1989) – majority party: National Party
- 21st South African Parliament (1989–1994) – majority party: National Party

=== Democratic Parliaments ===
- 22nd South African Parliament (1994–1999) – majority party: African National Congress
- 23rd South African Parliament (1999–2004) – majority party: African National Congress
- 24th South African Parliament (2004–2009) – majority party: African National Congress
- 25th South African Parliament (2009–2014) – majority party: African National Congress
- 26th South African Parliament (2014–2019) - majority party: African National Congress
- 27th South African Parliament (2019–2024) - majority party: African National Congress
- 28th South African Parliament (2024–present) - no majority; plurality: African National Congress

== See also ==
- Houses of Parliament, Cape Town
- List of acts of the Parliament of South Africa
- Politics of South Africa
- List of legislatures by country
- List of committees of the Parliament of South Africa
- Provincial legislatures of South Africa
