= Good Hope Building =

- Former names: Good Hope Theatre
- Alternative names: Good Hope Chamber

General information
- Architectural style: Cape Dutch Revival
- Location: Bouquet St, Cape Town CBD, Cape Town, South Africa
- Coordinates: 33.928132°S 18.418182°E
- Owner: Government of South Africa

The Good Hope Building is government building located within the Parliament of South Africa precinct in Cape Town.

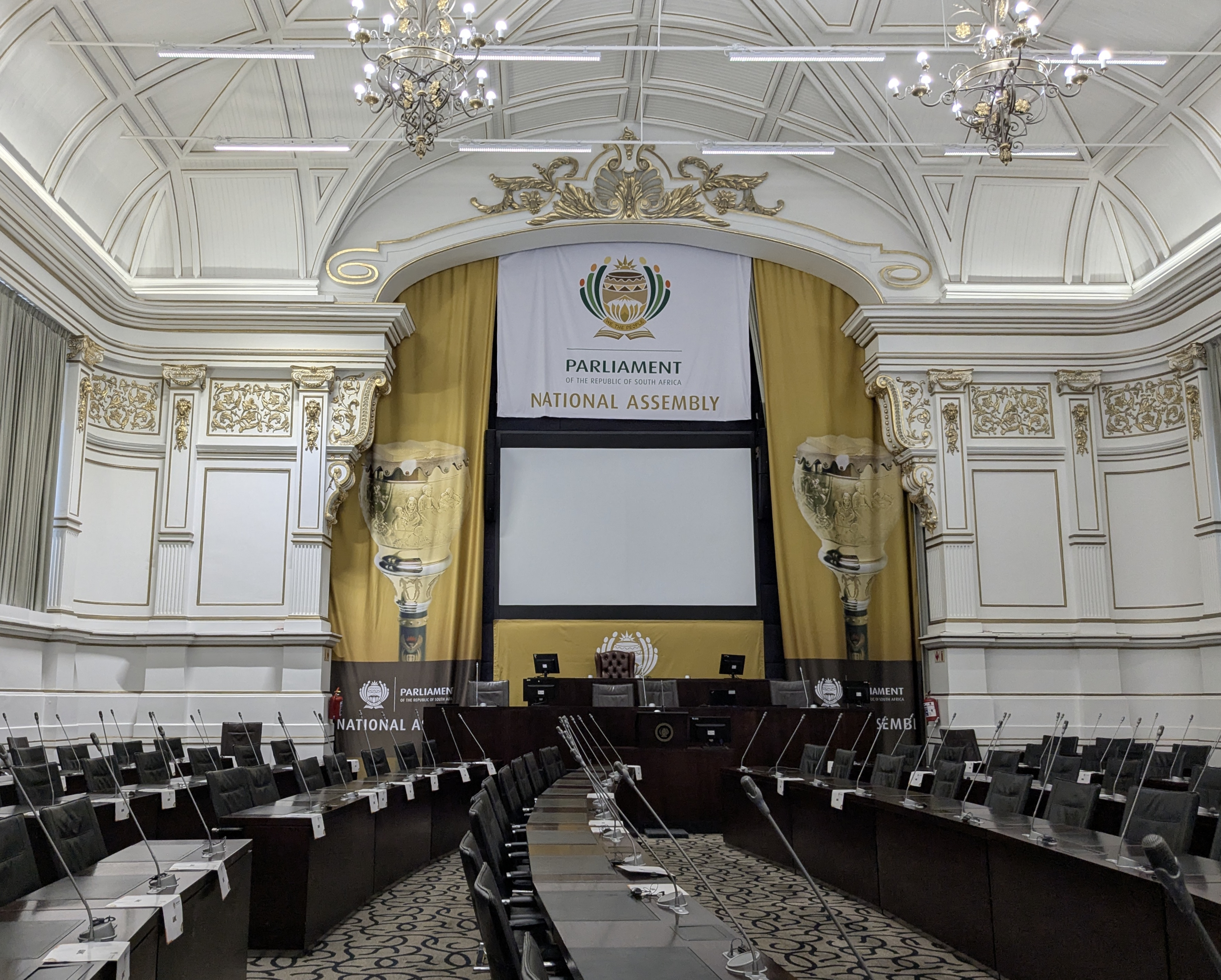
Good Hope Chamber - temporary meeting place of the National Assembly in 2025

== History ==
The building was used for parliamentary sittings of the Cape House of Assembly from 1854 to 1884. The sittings were then moved to a newly constructed building. After that, it served as the banqueting hall of the Goede Hope Masonic Lodge. It was destroyed by fire in 1892. It was then rebuilt as a music hall and theatre in about 1900 and was known as the Good Hope Theatre.

In 1916, it was purchased by the government from the Freemasons for use as staff offices for the Governor-General, who was seated in Tuynhuys. In 1925, a new façade was added in the Cape Dutch Revival style.

In the 1980s, it served as the State President's office and as the seat of the President's Council. MPs of the IFP used the building from 1994 to 2004.

Since 2004, it has been used by ANC MPs and the Presidency. Following the 2022 fire, the building has also served as a temporary venue for the National Assembly, with a seating capacity of 170.

== See also ==
- Houses of Parliament
