= Houses of Parliament, Cape Town =

Houses of Parliament of South Africa

Houses of Parliament
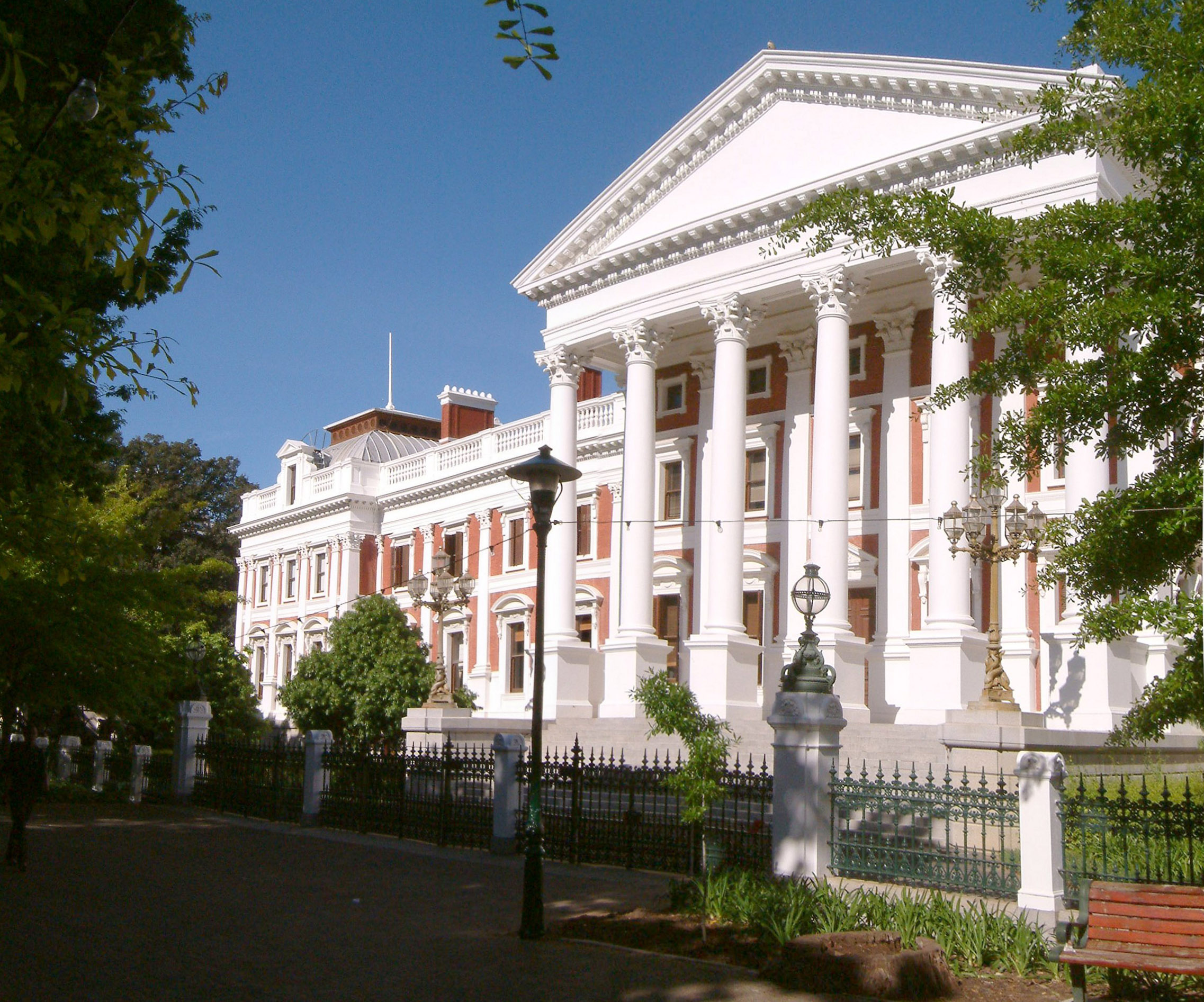
- The original 1884 parliament building viewed from the Company's Garden
- Interactive map of Houses of Parliament
- 33°55′34″S 18°25′09″E
- Location: 50 Parliament Street, Cape Town CBD, Cape Town South Africa

History
- Built: 1875–1884: Original building (NCOP building); 1910: Old Assembly building 1983–1985: National Assembly building
- Rebuilt: 2022–present (Old Assembly and National Assembly chambers)

Site notes
- Architect(s): Charles Freeman, Henry Greaves, Sir Herbert Baker
- Architectural styles: Neoclassical, Cape Dutch architecture
- Owner: Government of South Africa

The Houses of Parliament in Cape Town serve as the seat of the Parliament of South Africa, the country's national legislature. It consists of three main sections; the original 1884 building (now the National Council of Provinces building), the Old Assembly building (built in 1910), and the National Assembly building (built 1983–1985).

After sustaining substantial damage during a fire in January 2022, the Old Assembly and National Assembly buildings are currently undergoing major renovations. The R 4.6 billion project seeks to balance modernisation with retaining the site's heritage. The project is slated for completion in June 2027.

Since 2014, the building has been designated a National Heritage Site by the South African Heritage Resources Agency (SAHRA), receiving Grade 1 heritage status, the highest level of recognition.

== The original building (NCOP building) ==
=== Design and construction ===
The establishment of a parliament in the Cape Colony was approved by Queen Victoria in 1853. Initially, sessions were held at the Tuynhuys, the governor's residence, before moving to the Goede Hoop Masonic Lodge, a building used by the South African Freemasons. (Their Lodge was called de Goede Hoop). The upper house met in the Old Supreme Court Building, previously a slave lodge under Dutch rule.

By the late 19th century, there was growing pressure to construct a more prestigious and purpose-built parliamentary building. However, Prime Minister John Charles Molteno initially opposed the plan, citing financial concerns. Despite this, a committee was formed to oversee the selection of a design. Architect Charles Freeman was chosen, and construction commenced on 12 May 1875, with Governor Henry Barkly laying the foundation stone.

Freeman's design, while ambitious, contained several structural flaws. Poor soil conditions and groundwater issues caused unexpected complications, and costs quickly escalated beyond the original budget. Freeman was dismissed in 1876, and Henry Greaves was appointed to complete the project. Greaves simplified the design, removing extravagant elements such as a central dome, statues, and ornamental fountains to reduce costs.

Further setbacks occurred due to political instability. The British overthrow of the Cape government in 1878, the Confederation Wars, and the bankruptcy of the construction company in 1883 delayed progress. Despite these challenges, the building was completed in 1884. The official opening ceremony was led by Cape Prime Minister Thomas Scanlen and Governor Henry Robinson.

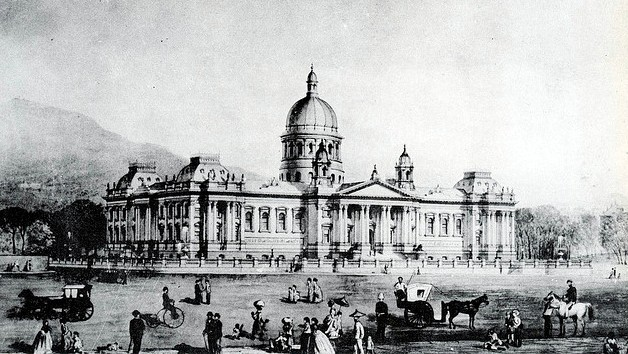
Freeman's original plan for the new Parliament

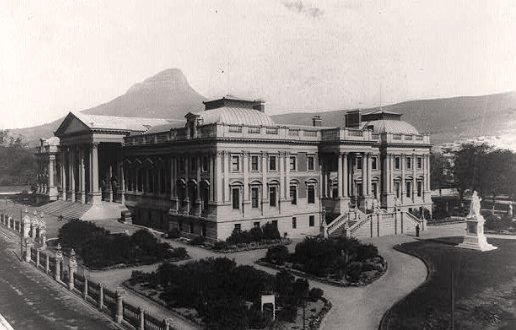
The final Parliament building as constructed (without statues, dome or fountains)

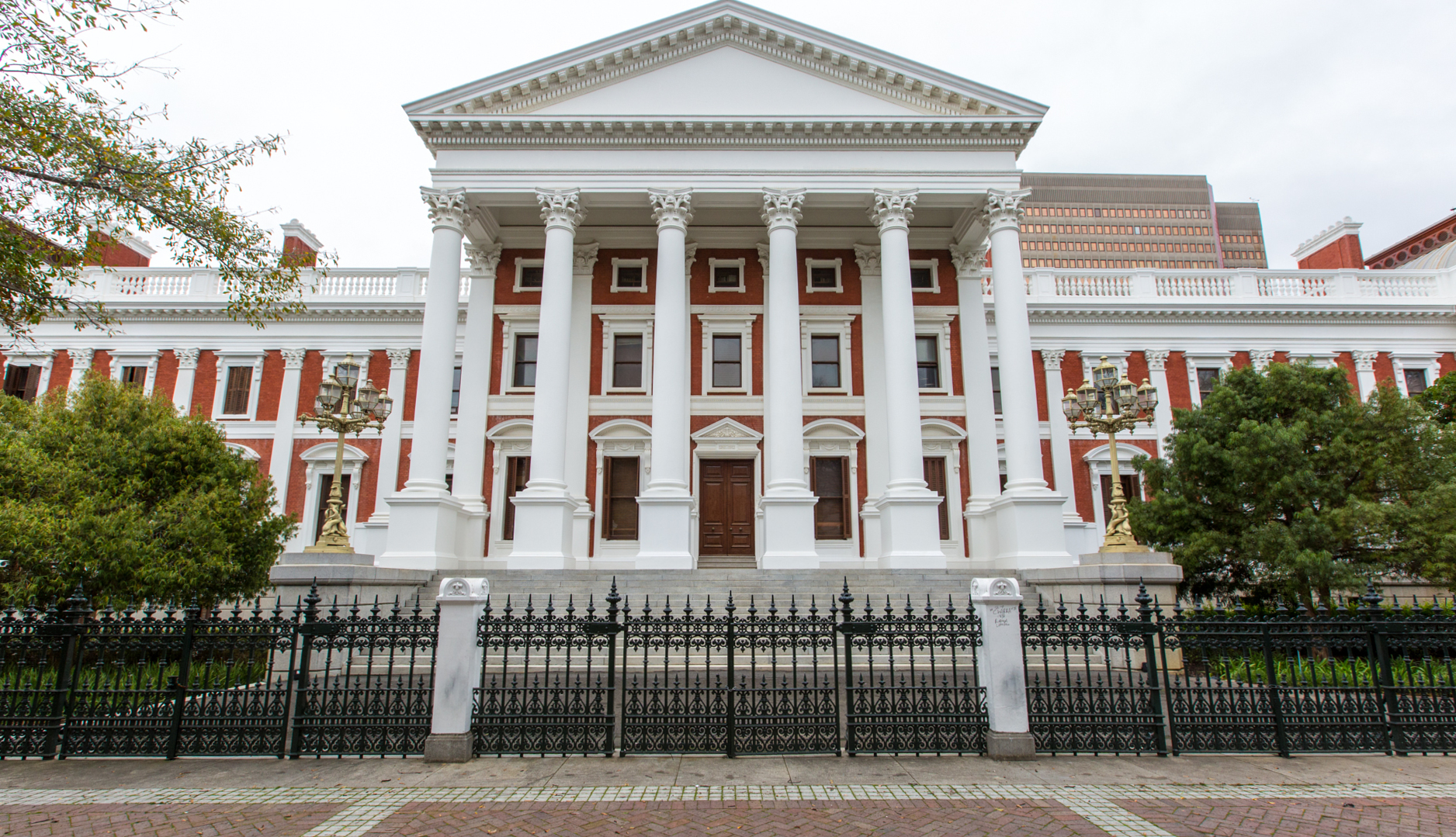
NCOP building (1884 building)

=== Chambers ===
This building, now known as the NCOP building, originally had two chambers. One chamber is still in use today and houses the NCOP chamber (formerly the Senate chamber). In 2001, the chamber was renovated into a semi-circular layout.

NCOP chamber (formerly the Senate chamber)
Time Period	Legislature	
Time Period	Body	House
1885–1910	Cape Parliament	Legislative Council
1910–1980	Parliament of South Africa	Senate
1984–1994	Tricameral Parliament	House of Representatives
1994–1996	Parliament of South Africa	Senate
1997–present	Parliament of South Africa	NCOP
NCOP chamber, formerly the Senate chamber, before the 2001 renovation NCOP chamber (current layout since 2001)

The other chamber was used as the lower house from 1885 until the Union of South Africa was formed in 1910. It was later converted into the Parliamentary Dining Room, managed by South African Railways & Harbours. In 1960, Prime Minister Harold Macmillan delivered his famous “Winds of Change” speech here, signaling the decline of British imperial rule in Africa.

Cape Parliament House of Assembly Chamber (1885–1910)
Time Period	Legislature	
Time Period	Body	House
1885–1910	Cape Parliament	House of Assembly
Cape Parliament - House of Assembly (1899)

== Old Assembly building ==
After the Union of South Africa was formed in 1910, a new chamber was built for the House of Assembly. It was designed by Sir Herbert Baker and constructed by AB Reid and Company. In 1927, 1960, and 1979, several changes were made to the building, including the addition of two wings containing about 80 offices and two meeting rooms.

During apartheid, this chamber exclusively seated White MPs. Post-1994, the Old Assembly chamber (House of Assembly chamber) is used as a committee room. Today, this building is known as the Old Assembly building.

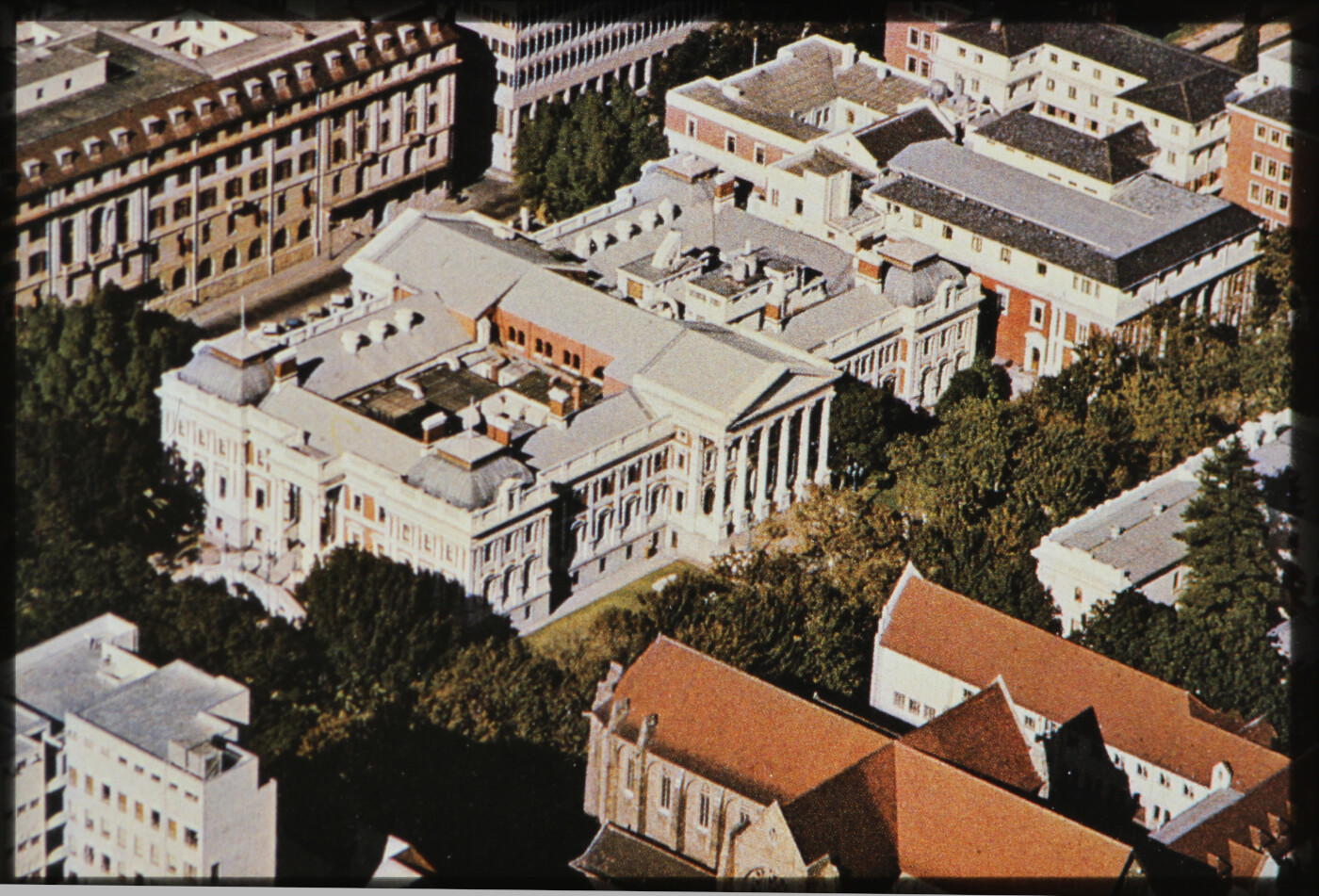
Original 1884 building with the Old Assembly building extension

House of Assembly chamber (Old Assembly chamber)
Time Period	Legislature	
Time Period	Body	House
1910–1994	Parliament of South Africa	House of Assembly
1994–present	Parliament of South Africa	Committee chamber
House of Assembly in session Prior to the on-going renovation

== National Assembly building ==
The National Assembly Building (formerly the New Assembly building) was built between 1983 and 1985 to accommodate South Africa’s tricameral parliamentary system, which introduced separate chambers for White, Coloured, and Indian representatives under the 1983 constitution. Following democratic elections in 1994, this building was repurposed for the new National Assembly. The National Assembly building (including chamber) was significantly damaged during the 2022 fire, leading to temporary relocation of parliamentary sessions.

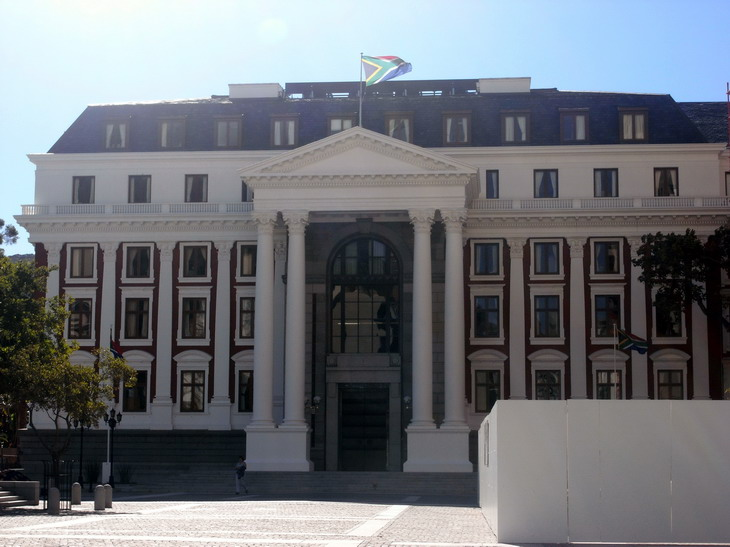
National Assembly building in 2008

National Assembly chamber (formerly the New Assembly chamber)
Time Period	Legislature	
Time Period	Body	House
1985–1994	Tricameral Parliament	House of Assembly; House of Delegates; House of Representatives
1994–present	Parliament of South Africa	National Assembly
National Assembly chamber (prior to the 2022 fire)

== 2022 fire ==
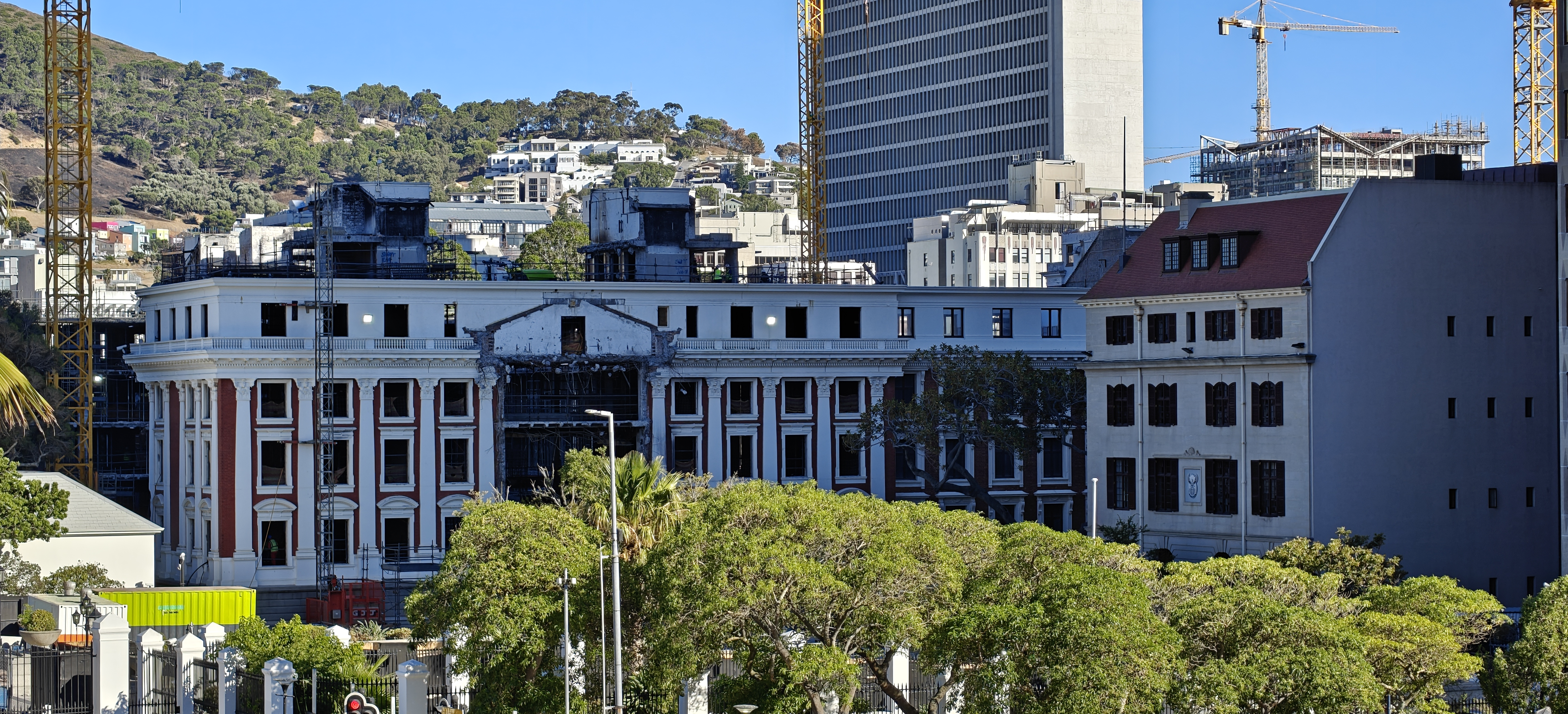
Houses of Parliament reconstruction work in January 2026

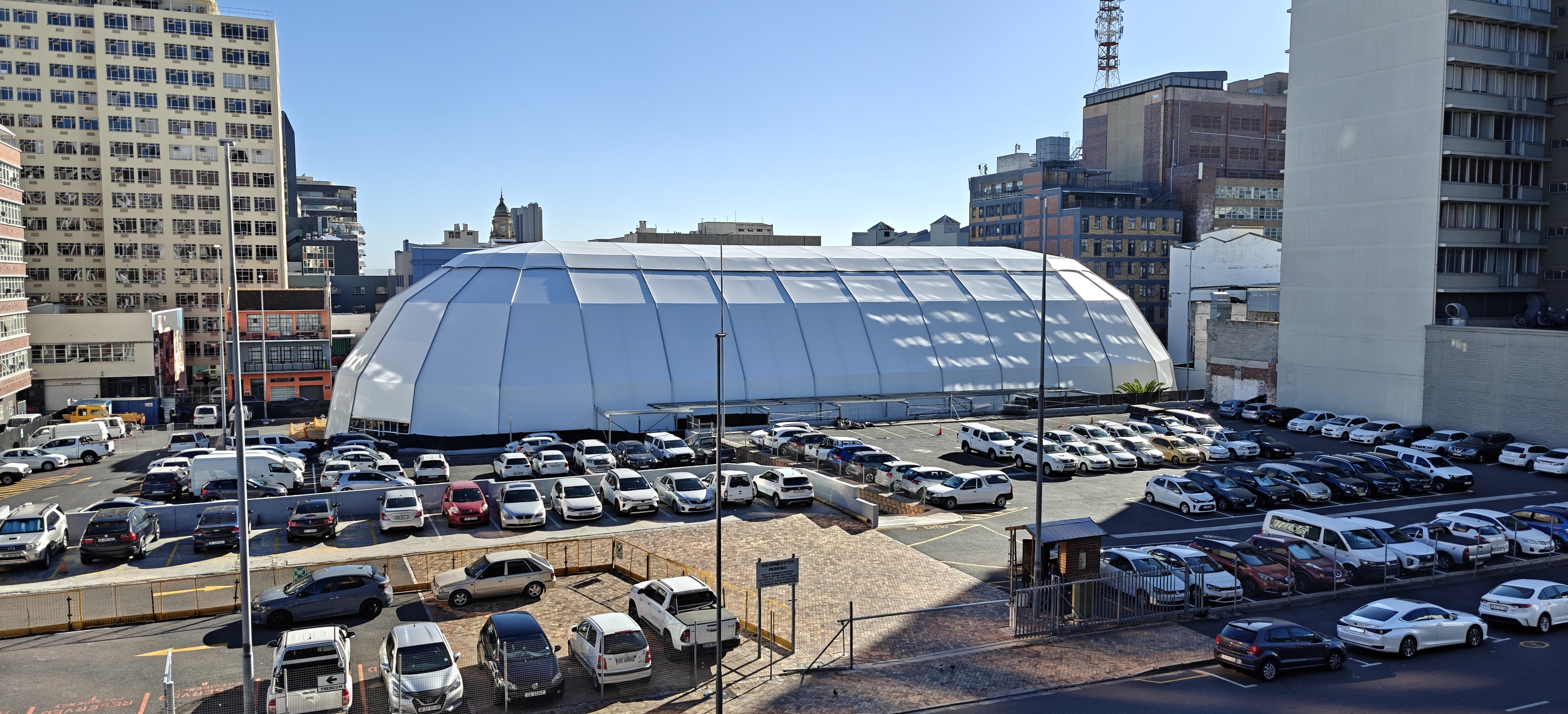
Temporary structure on Roeland Street, used as a parliamentary chamber while Parliament underwent reconstruction

During the morning of 2 January 2022, a fire broke out in third-floor offices in the parliamentary precinct and spread to the lower and upper houses. By mid-morning, fire crews were still attempting to control the fire.

The buildings were severely damaged. It was reported that the sprinkler system had not functioned correctly, and protection services staff were not on duty.

Police confirmed that a 49-year-old man had been detained for questioning. He was subsequently arrested by the Hawks Priority Crime unit. He has reportedly been charged with arson, housebreaking and theft under the National Key Points Act, and appeared in court on 4 January.

Identified by the New York Times as Zandile Christmas Mafe, 49, the suspect's sanity was questioned by prosecutors. The Times goes on to report, Mr. Mafe was "committed to a psychiatric hospital on Tuesday to determine whether he is fit to stand trial on terrorism and other charges."

=== Rebuild ===
A 4-year, R 4.6 billion project commenced to rebuild structures damaged during the fire. The renovations aimed to balance efforts to modernise the structures, with those to preserve the historic characteristics of the buildings. Both the Old and New Assembly buildings will be rebuilt, as well as around 500 parliamentary offices. The project has a completion date set for December 2026. This has since been moved to June 2027.

Parliament met in various other venues during the rebuild, including the Good Hope Chamber, Cape Town City Hall, and a custom-made structure (an enhanced Nieuwmeester Dome) that was built over a parking lot in Roeland Street, close to the Houses of Parliament. The specifications of the dome were overseen by Minister of Public Works and Infrastructure Dean Macpherson. The 2026 State of the Nation debates were held in the dome.

In August 2026, it was reported that the project was on track to finish by its new completion target of June 2027. The goal was to have the new buildings ready to host the 2027 SONA. The rebuild was within budget, with R2.43 billion of the total R4.68 billion having been spent so far. Updates were provided during a Joint Standing Committee on the Financial Management of Parliament meeting, after members attended a site visit to inspect the progress. The Development Bank of Southern Africa (DBSA), the project's implementing agent, told the committee that construction of the National Assembly building was 76% complete at the time.

== See also ==
- Parliament of South Africa
- Union Buildings
- Supreme Court of Appeal of South Africa
