= Grand Parade (Cape Town) =

Public square in Cape Town, South Africa

- Public square
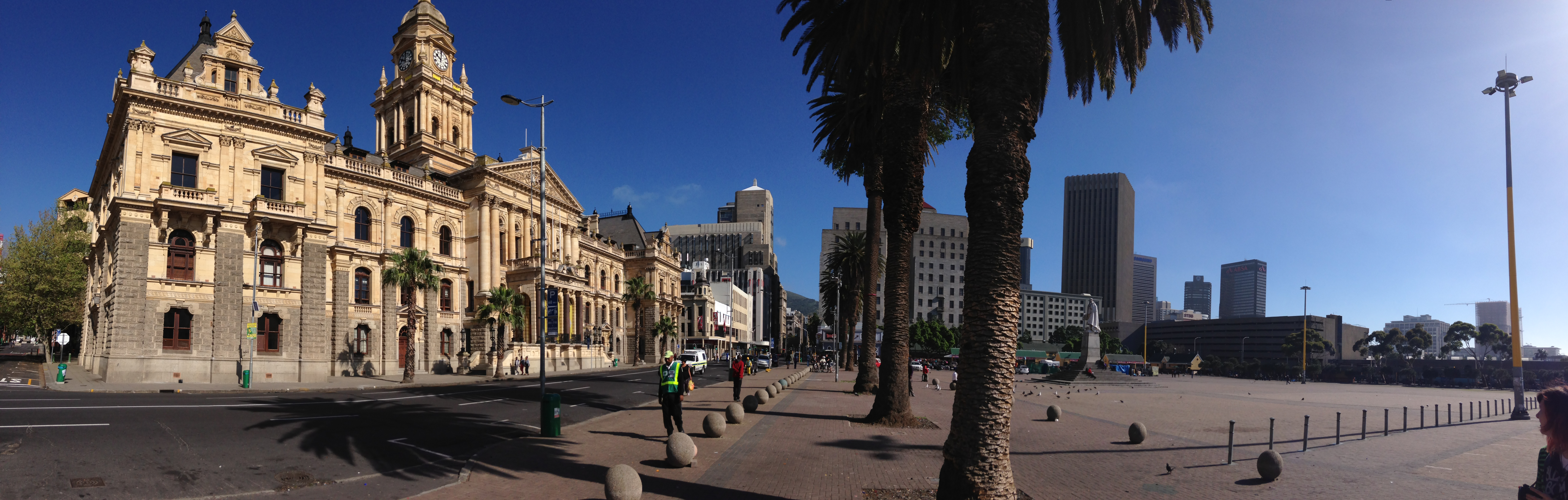
- A panoramic photograph of the old Cape Town City Hall and Grand Parade.
- Features: Cape Town City Hall, Castle of Good Hope, Cape Town railway station
- Location: Cape Town, South Africa
- Location of the Grand Parade in central Cape Town
- Coordinates: 33°55′29″S 18°25′29″E

The Grand Parade is the main public square in Cape Town, South Africa.

The square is surrounded by the Cape Town City Hall, the Castle of Good Hope, and the Cape Town railway station.

The square is generally used as a market place and parking area but has also been the venue of major political rallies. It was the first place where Nelson Mandela addressed South Africans following his release from prison in 1990 and also following his election as president on 9 May 1994.

The Grand Parade underwent extensive upgrades prior to being the venue for the 2010 World Cup FIFA Fan Fest in Cape Town.

== Gallery ==
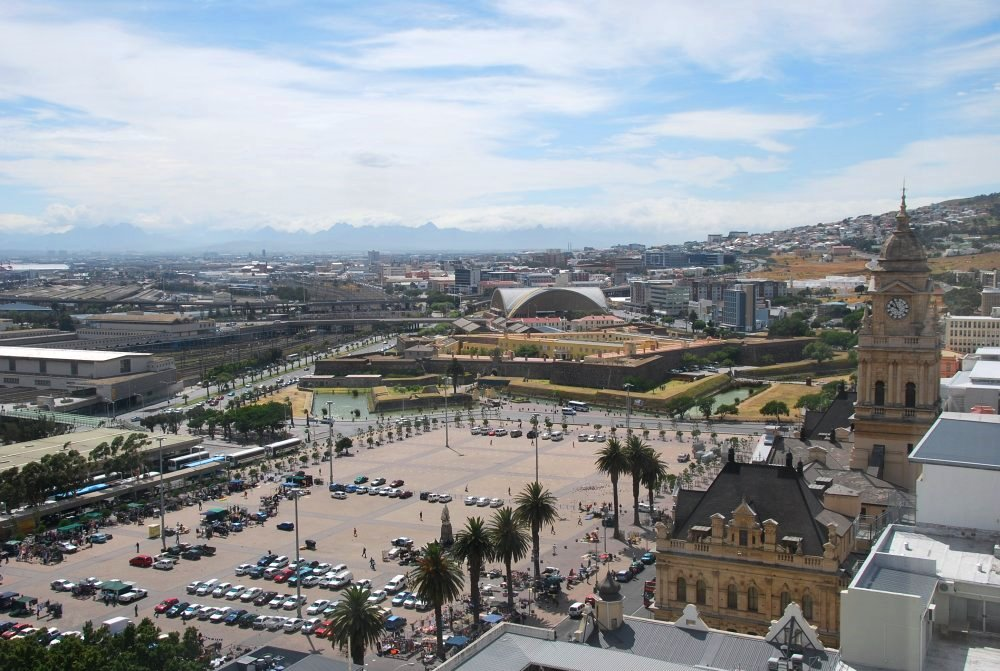
Grand Parade from the Mutual Building

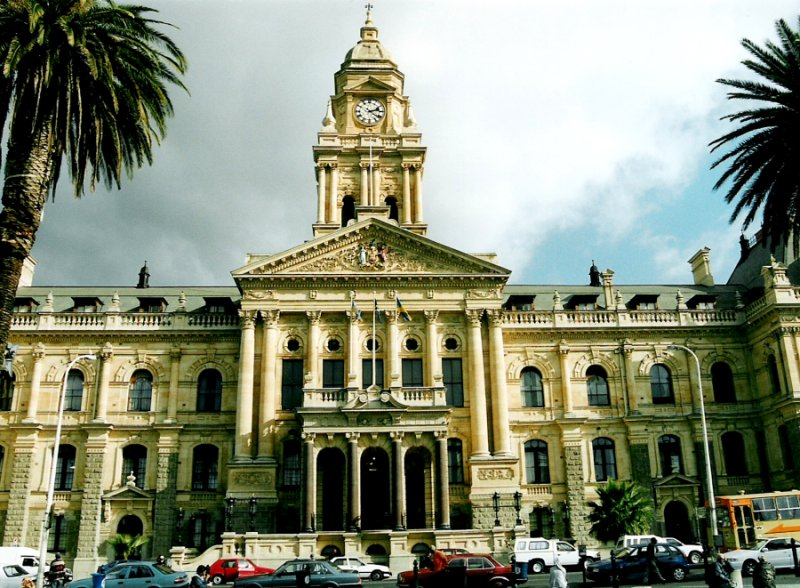
Cape Town City Hall

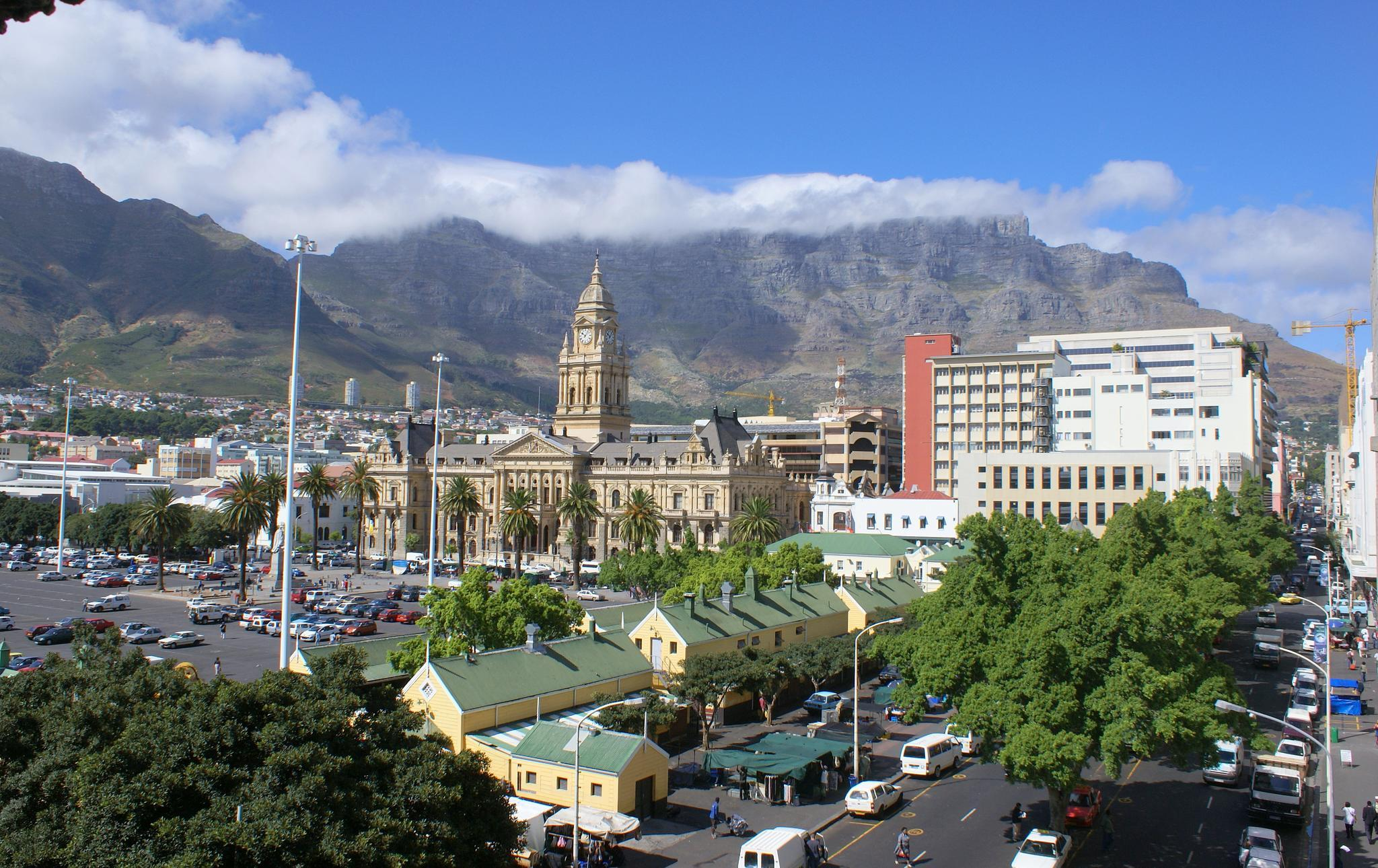
Cape Town City Hall, with Table Mountain in the background

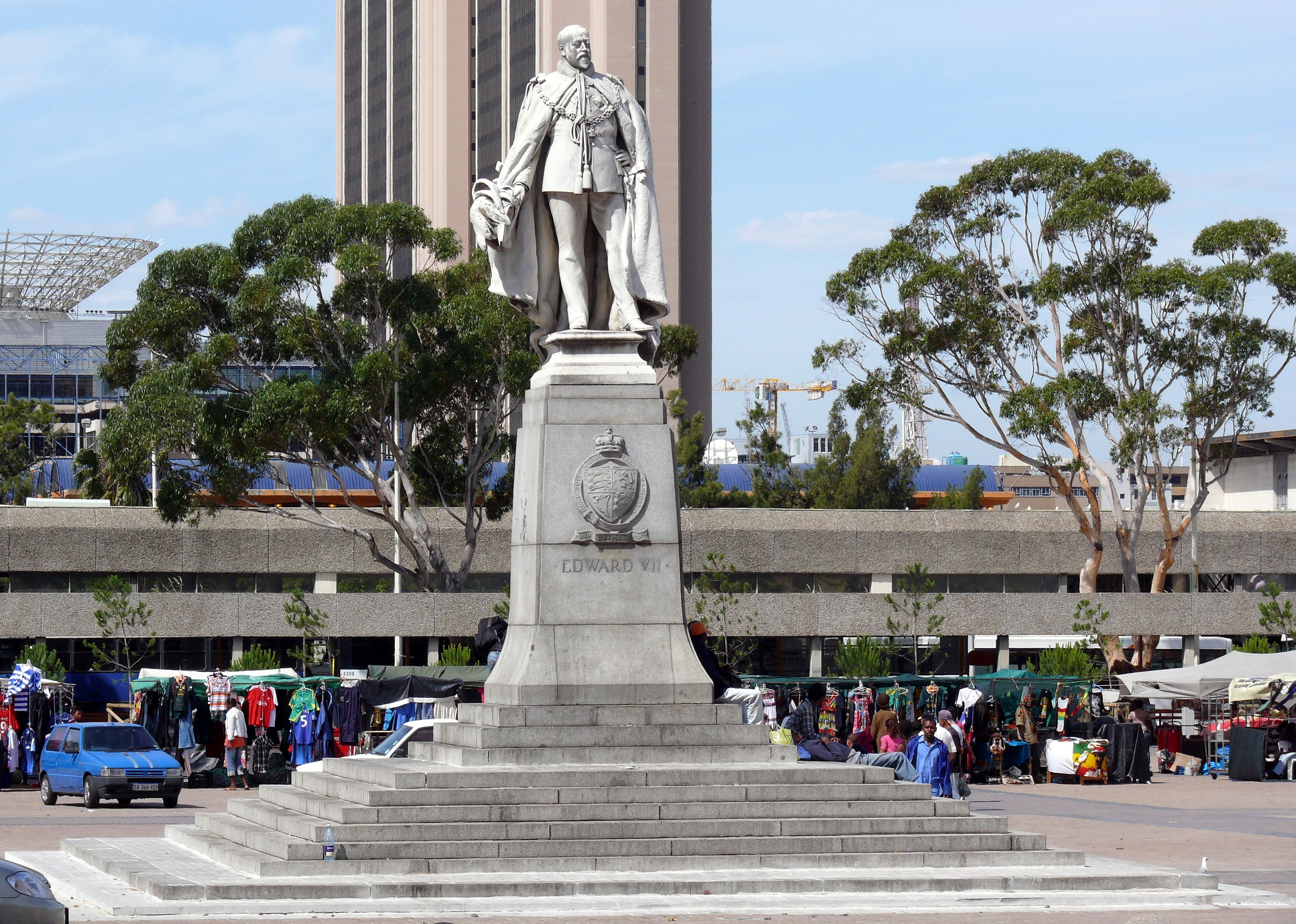
The Statue of Edward VII

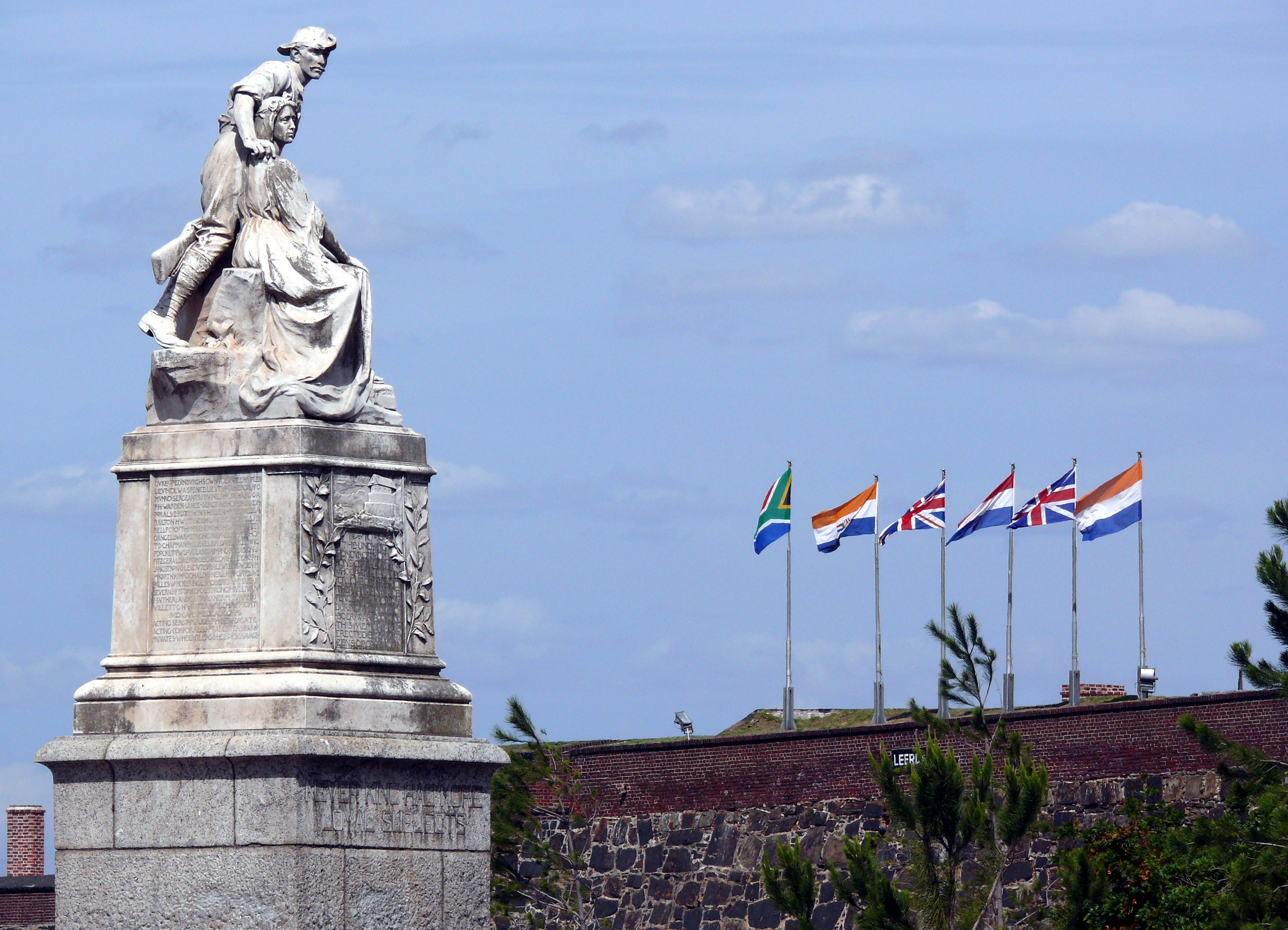
The Volunteer War Memorial

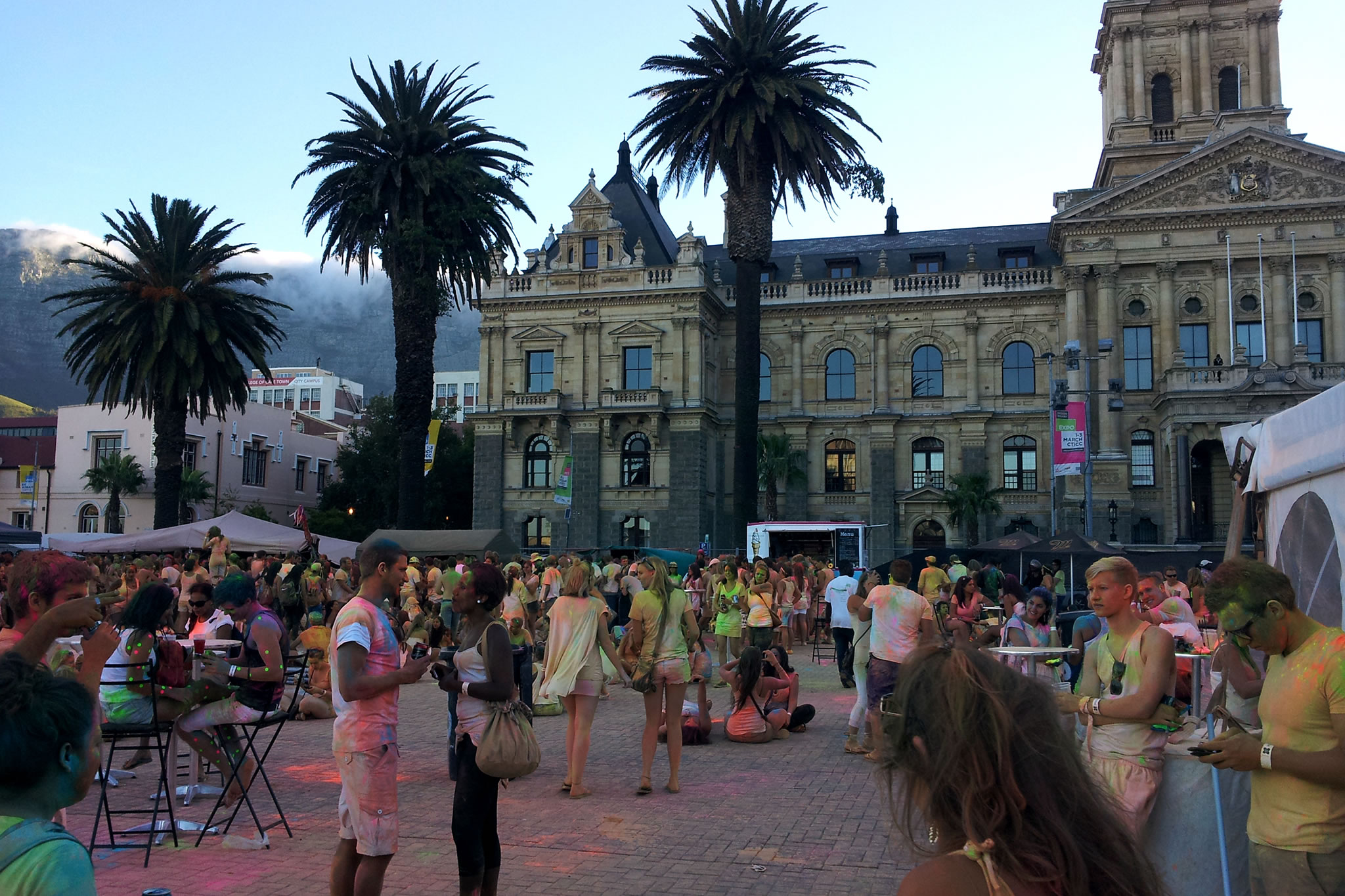
Holi festival at the Grand Parade

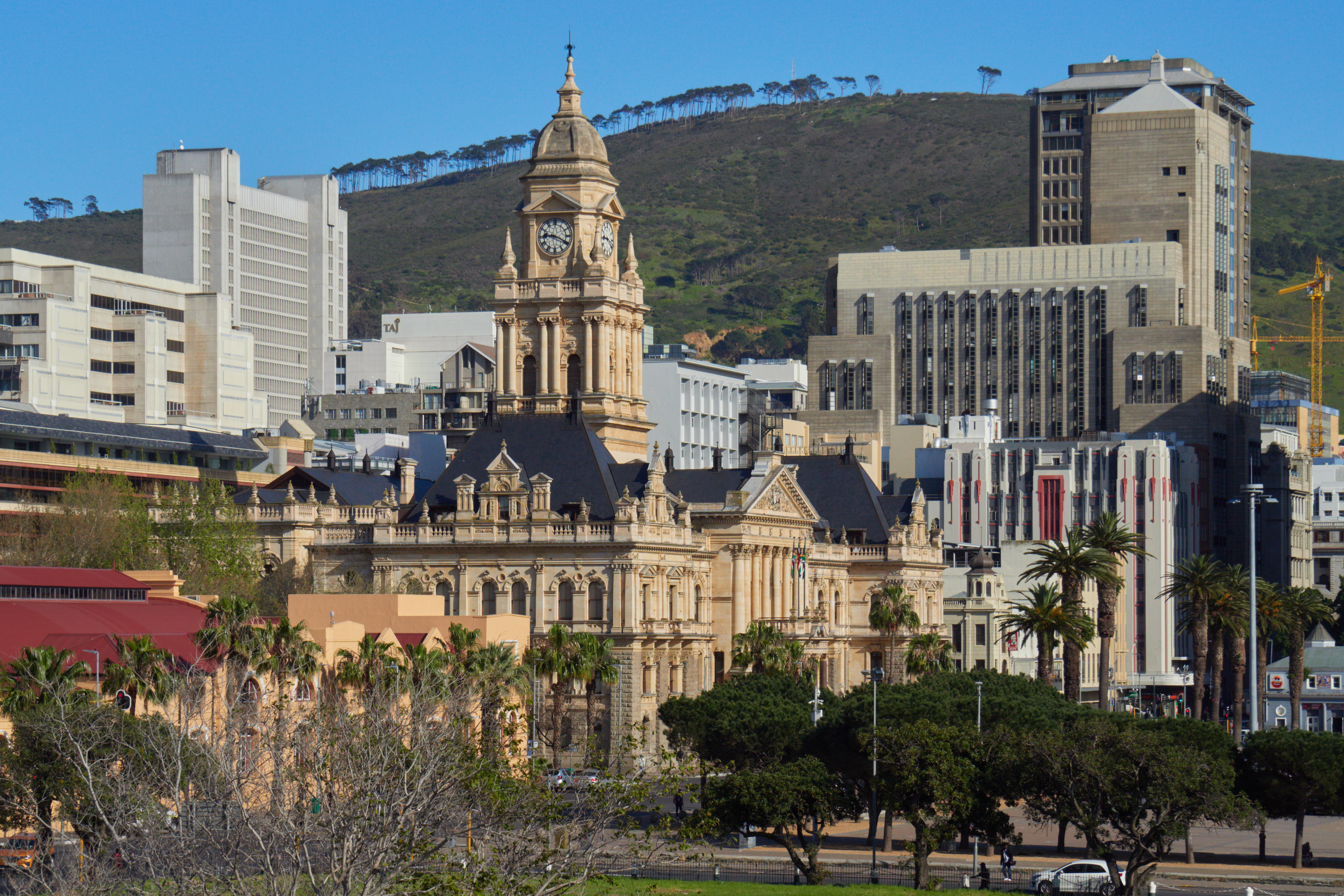
Grand Parade from Castle of Good Hope
