= State of the Nation Address (South Africa) =

Speech on the President of South Africa

The official logo of the South African State of the Nation Address, featuring a rendition of the Houses of Parliament

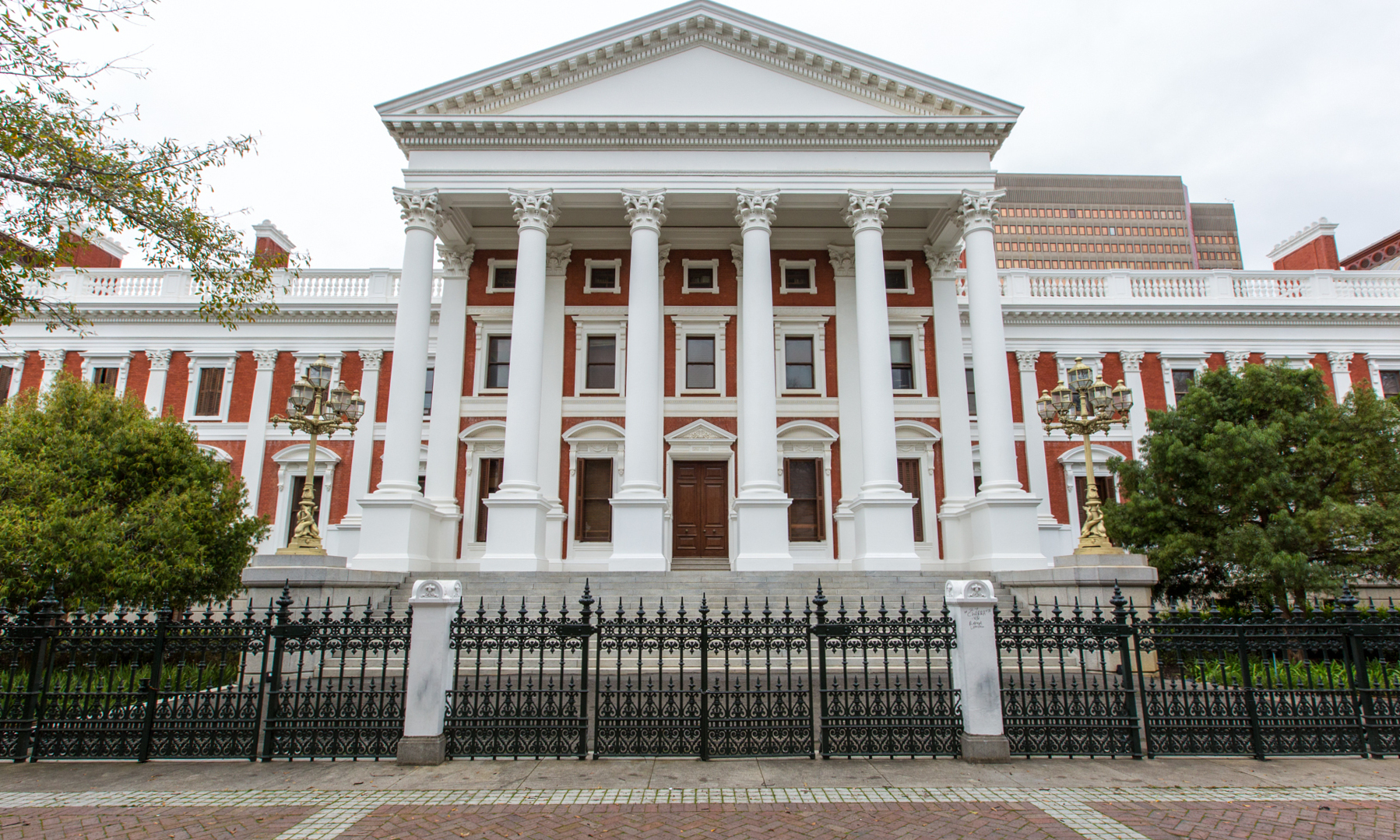
One of the buildings that comprise the Houses of Parliament, in Cape Town, where SONA is held each year

The State of the Nation Address of the President of South Africa (abbreviated SONA) is an annual event in the Republic of South Africa, in which the President of South Africa reports on the status of the nation, normally to the resumption of a joint sitting of Parliament (the National Assembly and the National Council of Provinces).

SONA traditionally takes place at the Houses of Parliament in Cape Town, which serves as the seat of the Parliament of South Africa.

The speech marks the opening of the parliamentary year and is usually attended by important political and governmental figures of South Africa, including former Presidents, the Chief Justice of the Constitutional Court and other members of the judiciary, the Governor of the Reserve Bank, and Ambassadors and Diplomats to the Republic.

The procession of the president into the joint session is accompanied by an imbongi reciting a praise poem for the president. The address is also preceded by the entrance of members of parliament, officials, celebrities and guests into the chamber on a red carpet, which is typically broadcast on television as a showcase of red carpet fashion.

Following the end of the speech, a parliamentary debate on the address is scheduled for the following sitting, followed by another sitting in which the president replies to the debate.

== History ==
The 2008 SONA marked the first address after the ousting of South African President Thabo Mbeki as President of the African National Congress (ANC) by former South African Deputy President Jacob Zuma, and also the absence of both former Presidents Nelson Mandela and FW de Klerk and their respective spouses.

The 2022 SONA, delivered by President Cyril Ramaphosa, was held in Cape Town's City Hall for the first time, due to a fire that same year causing significant damage to the Houses of Parliament.

With renovations to the Parliamentary buildings scheduled to be completed in December 2026, that year's State of the Nation Address took place in the custom-built dome located on Roeland Street, near the Houses of Parliament.

== Titles in South African official languages ==
Because the Republic of South Africa has eleven official languages, the State of the Nation Address is made available, either automatically or by request, in all of the official languages and published on the website of the Government Communications and Information Service (GCiS).

- Afrikaans: Staatsrede van die President van Suid-Afrika
- English: State of the Nation Address of the President of South Africa
- isiNdebele: Ikulumo yesiTjhaba kaMongameli weSewula Afrika
- isiXhosa: INtetho yeLizwe kaMongameli waseMzantsi Afrika
- isiZulu: Inkulumo Kamongameli Wase Ningizimu Afrika Yesimo Sezwe
- Sepedi: Polelo ya Setšhaba ka Mopresidente wa Afrika Borwa
- Sesotho: Puo ya Mopresident wa Afrika Borwa
- Setswana: Puo ya Maemo a Setšhaba ka Moporesitente wa Aforika Borwa
- Siswati: Inkulumo leyetfulelwa sive ngumengameli weleNingizimu Afrika
- Tshivenda: Mulaedza wa Lushaka wa Muphuresidennde wa Afrika Tshipembe
- Xitsonga: Mbulavulo wo Pfula Palamende lowu endliweke hi Phuresidente wa Afrika Dzonga

== See also ==
- Government of South Africa
- Parliament of South Africa
