= Cape Town City Hall =

Multi-use hall in Cape Town, South Africa

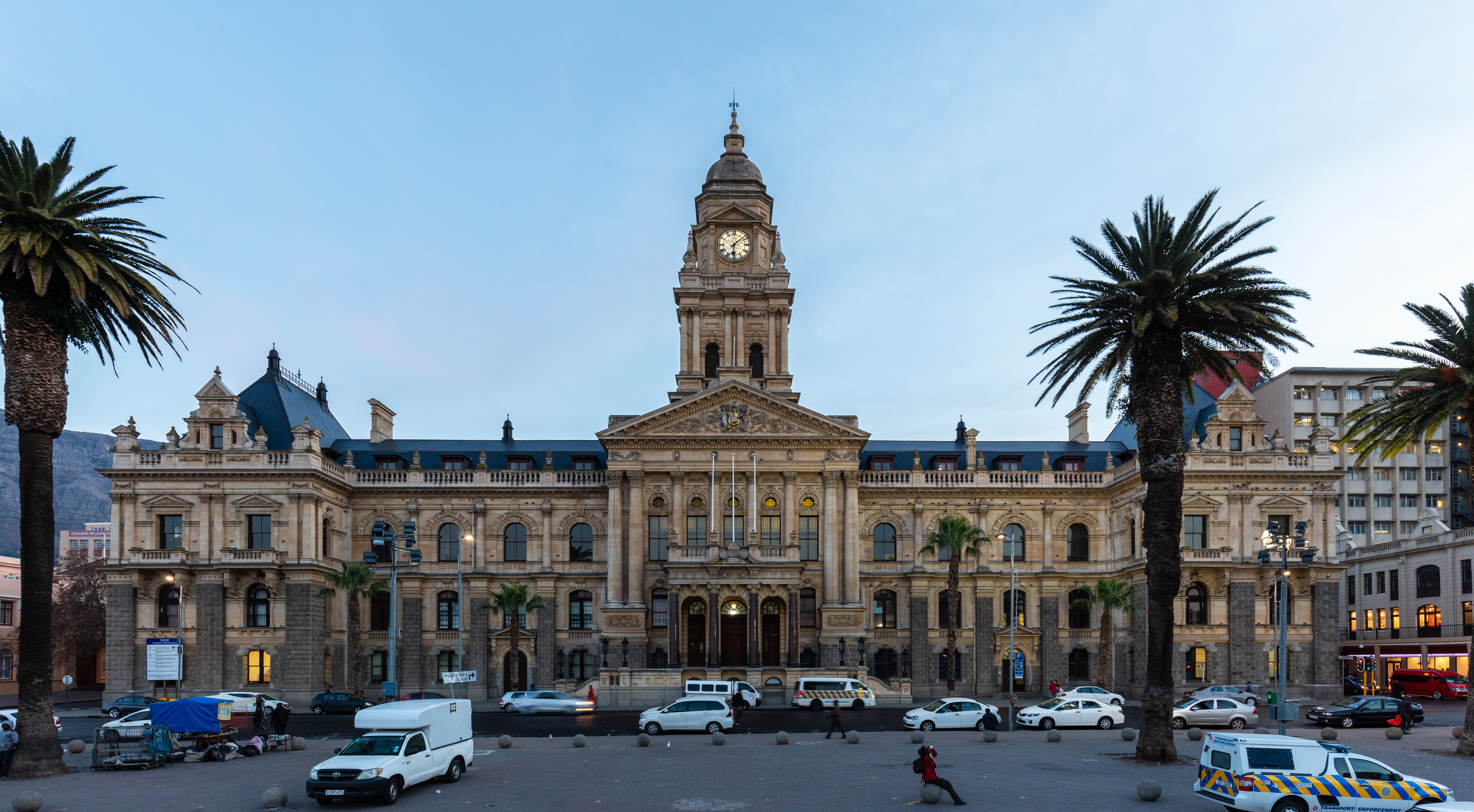
- Cape Town City Hall

- Location within Cape Town

General information
- Status: Recently restored
- Type: City Hall
- Architectural style: Edwardian
- Location: Grand Parade (Cape Town), Cape Town, South Africa
- Coordinates: 33°55′31″S 18°25′26″E
- Completed: 1900
- Opened: 1905
- Renovated: 2018
- Owner: City of Cape Town

Design and construction
- Architects: Messrs Henry Austin Reid and Frederick George Green
- Main contractor: Messrs T. Howard and F. G. Scott

Cape Town City Hall (Note: Afrikaans: Kaapstad Stadsaal) is a large Edwardian building, built in 1905, and located in Cape Town's city centre. It is located on the Grand Parade, to the west of the Castle, and is built from honey-coloured oolitic limestone, imported from Bath in England.

== History ==
Until 1905, the mother city did not have its own city hall, despite the local authorities having their own town halls. In 1887, around the Queen Victoria's Golden Jubilee, the construction of a city hall was mooted as a tribute, Six years later (1893) once the town council had approved of a scheme, a public competition was organized with H S Greaves, the chief architect of Public Works, as assessor.The winning architects were Messrs Harry Austin Reid and Frederick George Green, with the contractors being Messrs T. Howard and F. G. Scott. Much of the building material, including fixtures and fittings was imported from Europe. The building was formally opened by the Mayor of Cape Town, Hyman Liberman.

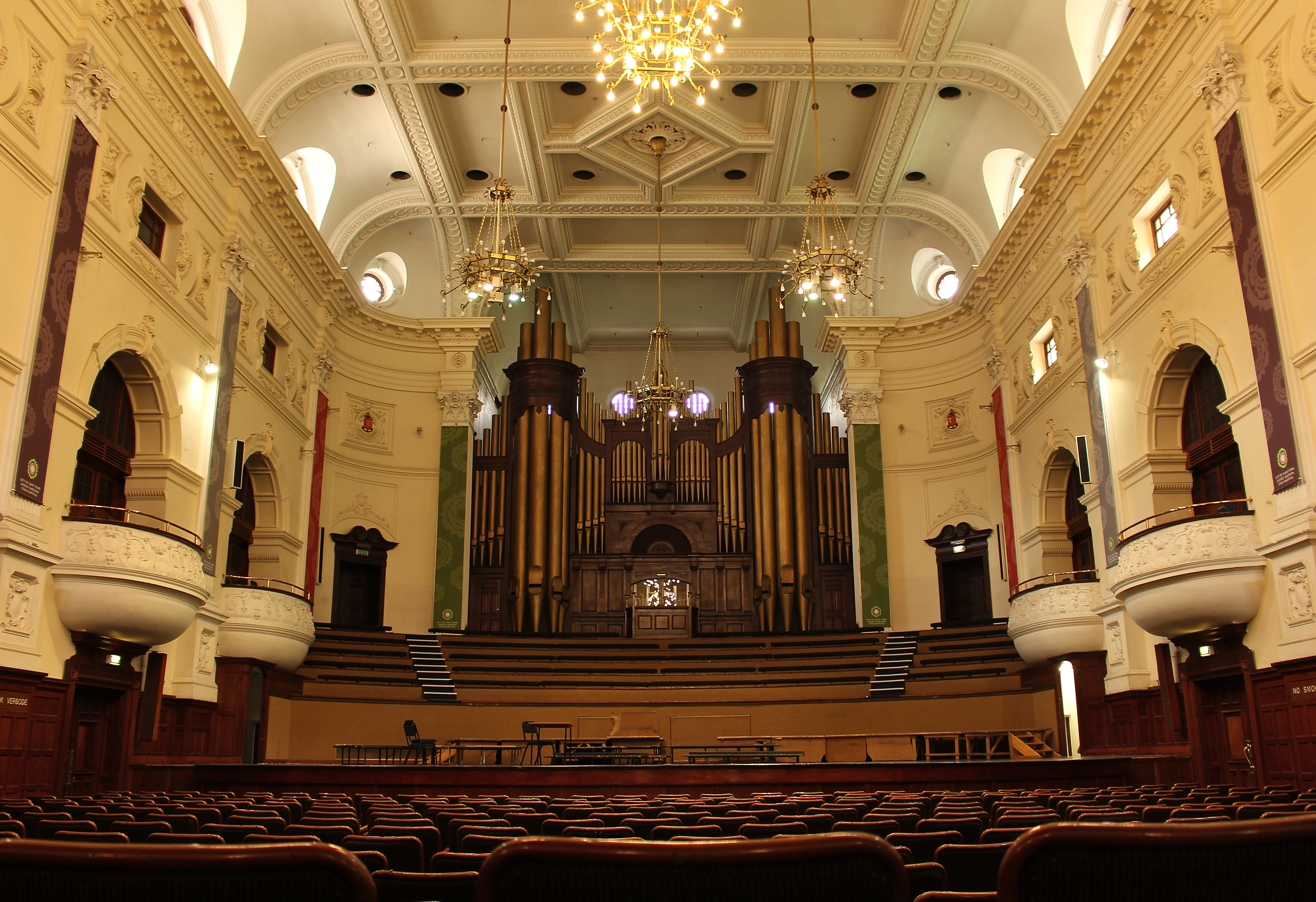
Auditorium with Organ

The Organ was built by Messrs Norman and Beard of London and Norwich, the specifications were drawn up by Sir George Martin, organist of St Paul's Cathedral in London especially for the City Hall. The workmanship and materials are of high quality, and the organ made from mahogany, teak and pine. Sir George Martin spoke of it as “a magnificent instrument in every gradation of tone, from the softest stop to the most powerful tuba being found in the organ, and all under the most perfect control, and that altogether the instrument must be regarded as an artistic and mechanical triumph”. There are altogether 3165 pipes varying from 32 feet (10 metres) to 3/4 inch (19 millimetres). The wind was supplied by a Kinetic Blower worked by an electric motor.

The tower of the City Hall has a Turret Clock which strikes the hours and chimes the Westminster quarters. The faces of the clock are made from 4 skeleton iron dials filled with opal. The clock has a 24-hour wheel and lever. The bells were cast by Messrs John Taylor and Co of Loughborough and the clock was supplied by JB Joyce & Co of Whitchurch.

The City Hall's carillon was installed as a World War I war memorial, with 22 additional bells being added in 1925 with the visit of the Prince of Wales.

On February 11, 1990, only hours after his release from prison, Nelson Mandela made his first public speech from the balcony of Cape Town City Hall.

On 2 January 2022, the National Assembly building of the Parliament of South Africa was severely damaged in a fire at the parliamentary precinct. The City of Cape Town subsequently made the City Hall and Grand Parade available for President Cyril Ramaphosa's State of the Nation Address. On 7 January, Parliament announced that Ramaphosa's State of the Nation Address would take place at the City Hall on 10 February. It was to be attended by 300 Members of Parliament (MPs) and 70 guests to comply with COVID-19 regulations.

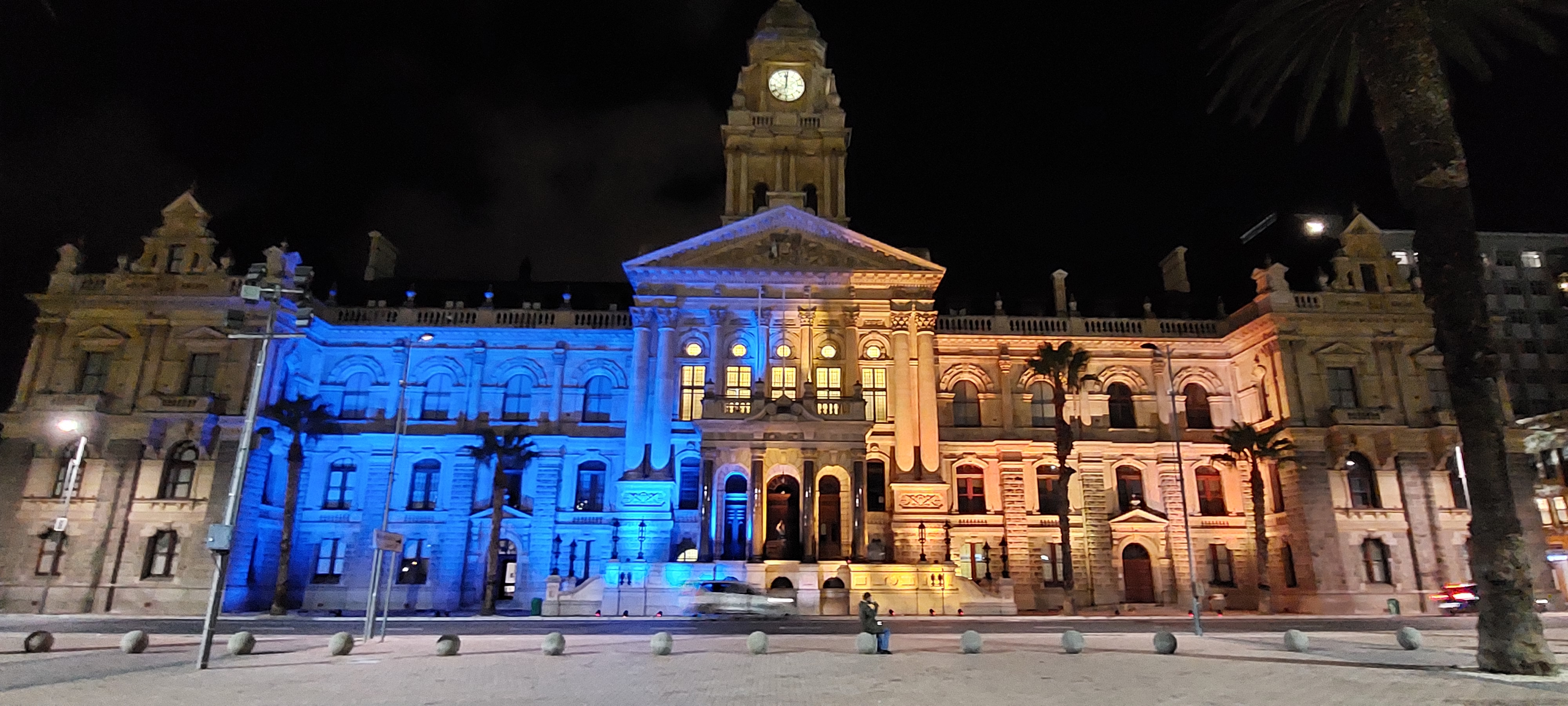
The City Hall being lit up in the colours of the Ukrainian flag to indicate Cape Town's support for the country during the Russian invasion of 2022.

The hall was lit up in the colours of the Ukrainian flag on the night of 2 March 2022 to show the city's support for the country during the 2022 Russian invasion of Ukraine.

== Contemporary use ==
The City Hall no longer houses the offices of the City of Cape Town, which are located in the Cape Town Civic Centre. From 1982 to 2008 it hosted the Central Library, which has since moved to the adjacent Old Drill Hall. The City Hall has become a central venue for creative and cultural events such as art exhibitions and concerts. It is the main venue for the symphony concerts of the Cape Town Philharmonic Orchestra. One of these events includes the City Hall Sessions.

Perhaps the most widely publicized event held at the Cape Town City Hall is the Festive Lights Switch On, hosted by the City of Cape Town. The event is free to all, and includes top local performers, musicians and a projection mapping display on the facade of the building.

It has been used as a location in a number of film and television series such as The Cape Town Affair, The Crown, Black Sails, and Blood & Water.

== Statue of Nelson Mandela ==
On 24 July 2018, a statue of Nelson Mandela on the balcony overlooking the Grand Parade was unveiled. It was on the same spot where he made a speech when he was released from prison on 11 February 1990. A 3D computer model of the Nelson Mandela Statue was also created. The 3D model is based on terrestrial laser scanning and photogrammetry.

== Panorama ==
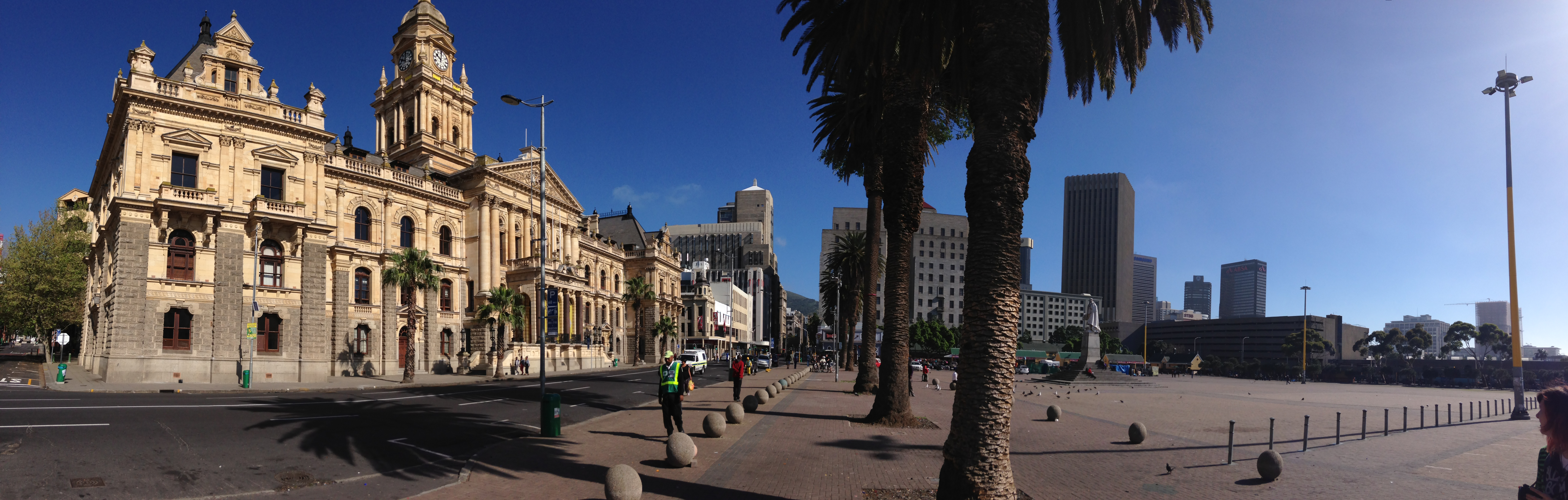
A panoramic view of Cape Town's city hall including Grand Parade.

== Documentation with 3D Laser Scanning ==
Between 2017 and 2018, the Zamani Project documented the Cape Town City Hall with terrestrial 3D laser scanning. A textured 3D model and a Virtual-Tour (Panorama-Tour) is available on the City of Cape Town's website (http://www.capetown.gov.za). The non-profit research group from the University of Cape town (South Africa) specialises in 3D digital documentation of tangible cultural heritage. The data generated by the Zamani Project creates a permanent record that can be used for research, education, restoration, and conservation.

=== Animation ===
An animation, based on the 3D model of the Cape Town City Hall was created by the Zamani Project.

== See also ==
- Media related to Cape Town City Hall at Wikimedia Commons
- Site by City Hall, Darling Street, Cape Town , at SAHRA
