= Member of Parliament (South Africa) =

Democratically elected representative in the Parliament of South Africa

A Member of Parliament (MP) in South Africa refers to an individual who serves in the Parliament of South Africa. Members of Parliament are elected democratically, and serve as public representatives for terms of five years, which are renewable indefinitely.

An MP holds one of Parliament's seats, and may be affiliated with one of South Africa's registered political parties, or be an independent representative, with no party affiliation.

Some MPs are members of the Cabinet, if they are part of the ruling party or ruling coalition of parties. Other MPs form part of the Official Opposition, if one is established. Other MPs are part of neither of those bodies. All MPs are sworn in by the Chief Justice of South Africa. MPs then proceed to elect the President of South Africa.

Every citizen of South Africa who is registered to vote is eligible to become a Member of Parliament, except if one of the exclusionary criteria applies, under the Constitution.

South African MPs may serve in either the lower house; the National Assembly, or the upper house; the National Council of Provinces (NCOP). As of 2026, in the 28th South African Parliament, there are 400 MPs serving in the National Assembly and 90 in the NCOP, for a total of 490 representatives.

== Main responsibilities ==
A Member of Parliament's primary function is to represent their constituents, to ensure government by the people, under South Africa's Constitution. MPs in the National Assembly represent the people of South Africa directly, while MPs in the NCOP represent the Provinces of South Africa. MPs may serve on one of Parliament's Committees.

As part of their work, MPs may write, debate, and pass legislation, engage with communities and other stakeholders, and hold the cabinet accountable to the Constitution and the people of South Africa.

In the 2025 Parliamentary Program, approximately 32% of the work time of MPs was allocated to constituency duties. As part of their roles, MPs must be available to the people they represent, and report back on what is happening in Parliament.

When in Parliament, MPs attend:

- Plenary groups, which invite all the members of a house, to facilitate debate recommendations from Committees, and final decisions
- Joint sittings, in which all members of both Houses of Parliament sit for an event, such as the annual State of the Nation Address
- Committee meetings, where much of the lawmaking and Parliamentary oversight work is done

== Committees ==
As of 2026, there are over 40 Parliamentary Committees in the National Assembly, and 15 in the National Council of Provinces. Attendance at Committee meetings is expected, though there may be exceptions. Smaller parties may sometimes have a member serving as an alternative Committee member, instead of a full member. Parliamentary Committee types include:

- Portfolio committees, focused on particular spheres of government
- Select committees, which oversee the work of government Departments
- Internal committees, which deal with matters relating to the running of Parliament
- Ad hoc committees, appointed when a specific task must be done
- Joint committees, appointed by both the National Assembly and the NCOP

== Provincial Parliaments ==
The term Member of Parliament is reserved for the Parliament of South Africa. In contrast, at the Provincial level, the term Member of the Provincial Legislature (MPL) is used for all provinces except the Western Cape, where Member of Provincial Parliament (MPP) is used.

== See also ==
- Elections in South Africa
- Parliament of South Africa
- National Assembly of South Africa
- Politics in South Africa
- Democracy
- List of National Assembly members of the 28th Parliament of South Africa
