= 2022 Parliament of South Africa fire =

Fire at the parliamentary precinct in Cape Town, South Africa

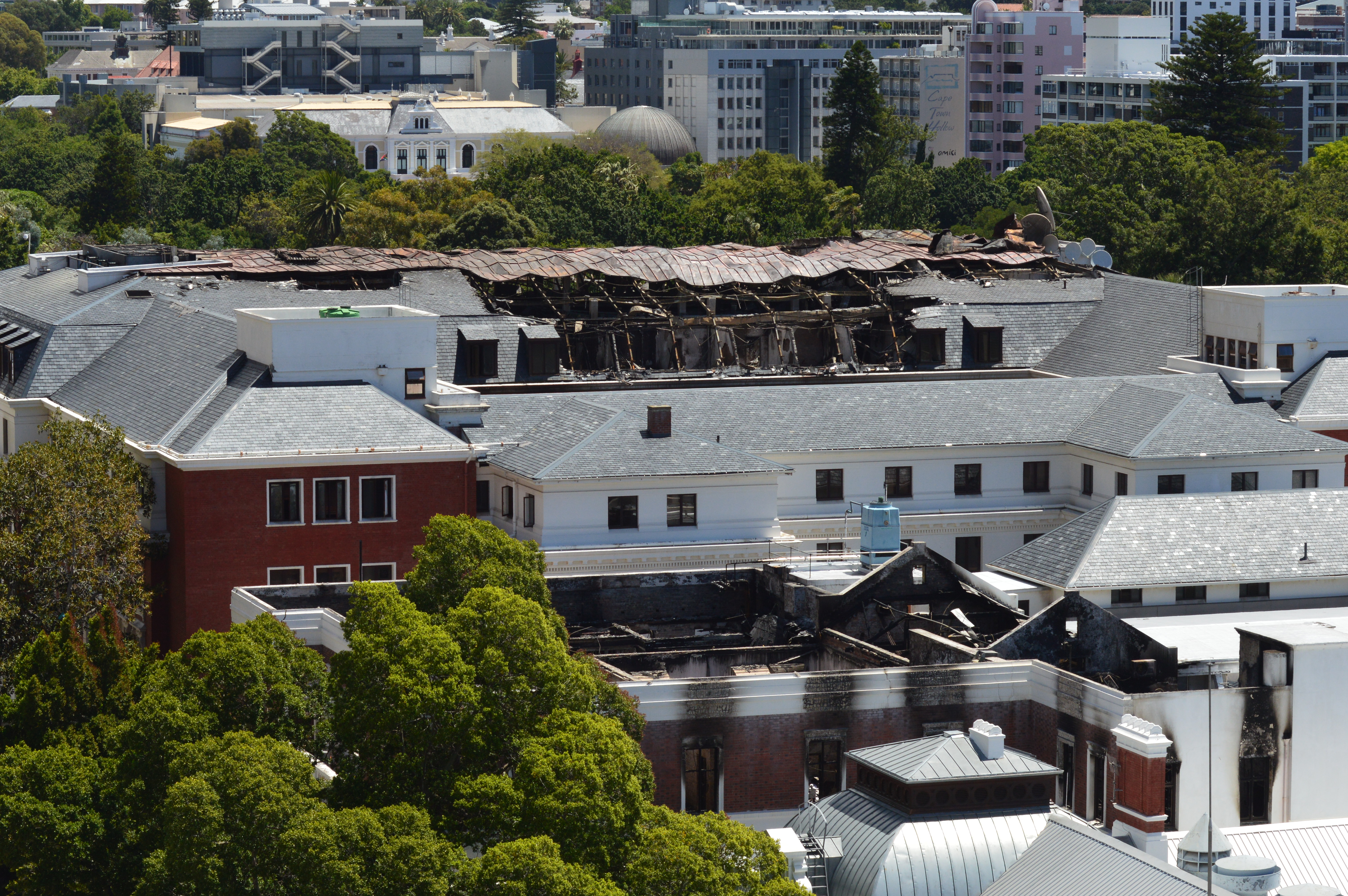
- A view of the South African Parliamentary buildings following the fire.
- Date: 2 January 2022; 4 years ago
- Time: 05:00 SAST (03:00 UTC)
- Venue: Houses of Parliament, Cape Town
- Location: Cape Town; 33°55′37″S 18°25′12″E
- Cause: Arson
- Suspects: Zandile Christmas Mafe

The 2022 Parliament of South Africa fire was a major fire at the parliamentary complex in Cape Town, South Africa.

== Fire and response ==
On 2 January 2022, just after 05:00 am (SAST), the City of Cape Town's Fire & Rescue Service were notified of a fire at the parliamentary complex. The fire started on the third floor of the National Council of Provinces building and spread to the office space and the gymnasium, before spreading to the National Assembly.

By the following morning, fire services personnel were still damping small hotspots in the complex. During the afternoon on 3 January, a fire broke out again on the roof of the National Assembly building.

== Damage ==
The fire severely damaged the new National Assembly building. Offices and the gymnasium in the old National Assembly building were destroyed, and some floors suffered water and smoke damage.

Despite extensive damage to the complex buildings, important works of art and heritage were reportedly intact.

== Aftermath ==
=== Arrest ===
A 49-year-old male suspect was arrested on 2 January by the South African Police Service (SAPS) Directorate for Priority Crime Investigation (DPCI), colloquially known as the Hawks. The suspect is currently facing charges of arson, housebreaking, and theft under the National Key Points Act, and was due to appear in court on 4 January. After a brief appearance in the Cape Town Magistrates' Court, the suspect Zandile Christmas Mafe was remanded into custody until 11 January, pending a bail application and further investigation of the circumstances of the fire. The prosecution revealed he has been diagnosed with paranoid schizophrenia. The state wants him committed to a mental institution for 30 days observation to decide whether he is fit to stand trial.

=== Investigation ===
Initial reports stated that the sprinkler system had not functioned correctly, protection services staff were not on duty, and the CCTV system was not being monitored in the time running up to the start of the fire.

On 6 January 2022, the City of Cape Town released a preliminary report based on observations from the fire services. This report confirmed that the National Assembly sprinkler valve system had not been serviced since 2017, and was closed at the time of the fire. It also found that fire doors were latched open, which aided the spread of the fire.

=== SONA and National Assembly sittings ===
On 7 January 2022, National Assembly Speaker Nosiviwe Mapisa-Nqakula and National Council of Provinces Chairperson Amos Masondo revealed in a statement that President Cyril Ramaphosa's State of the Nation Address (SONA) would be held at the Cape Town City Hall on 10 February 2022. The subsequent Debate on the State of the National Address and the President's Reply will also take place at the venue. The SONA was attended by 300 Members of Parliament and 70 guests in order to comply with COVID-19 regulations.

On 10 January, Mapisa-Nqakula announced that National Assembly sittings, including Finance Minister Enoch Godongwana's Budget Speech in February, will be held in the Good Hope Chamber. The Good Hope Chamber is one of the oldest meeting rooms of Parliament. It was the meeting place of the Parliament of the Cape of Good Hope from 1854 to 1885. The chamber has a seating capacity for 170 persons and allows 70 persons under COVID-19 regulations.

=== Alleged confession ===
On 29 January 2022, the State alleged that Mafe confessed to starting a fire in the parliamentary building. According to an affidavit given to investigators after his arrest and read out to the court, Mafe said that it was "the right thing" to set parliament on fire as he wanted to prevent Ramaphosa from delivering his annual SONA. He also demanded Ramaphosa's resignation, the release of Janusz Waluś as well as R1,500 for unemployed South Africans.

=== Repair and refurbishment ===
The Secretary of Parliament, Mr Xolile George, stated the rebuilding of Parliament will cost R2 billion, and take approximately 2 years to complete. In March 2023, the Development Bank of Southern Africa (DBSA) was appointed as the Project Lead. The full restoration is intended to be completed by 10 September 2025. Members of Parliament were to receive offices and new equipment to complete their work as soon as possible, according to the Speaker of the National Assembly, Nosiviwe Mapisa-Nqakula.

An initial estimate of R2.2 billion for the rebuild in 2024 ballooned to R4.6 billion in 2025. The rebuild includes the 1983 National Assembly building, the Old Assembly Building, and the 90 Plein Street offices.
