= List of National Key Points =

The following is a list of all sites that have been declared as being of "national strategic importance against sabotage", or National Key Points, by the South African Minister of Police in terms of the National Key Points Act, 1980 (Note: This power originally lay with the Minister of Defence, but in 2004 it was transferred by a presidential proclamation issued in terms of Section 97 of the Constitution to the Minister of Safety and Security. The portfolio of Safety and Security has since been renamed Police.), as publicised for the first time on 16 January 2015. (Note: The originally released list is somewhat vague in details on some sites, and a best guess is used to identify the specified National Key Point. These are calculated by comparing to other sites on the list and evaluating the strategic value of the site: IE. SABC PE(Port Elizabeth): The Post Office Tower, used for Communications, Radio and T.V. transmissions is the best fit for this site. Whereas the SABC offices in Port Elizabeth would have less strategic importance, because a transmission tower would still be needed.)

== Eastern Cape ==
- SABC PE - Post Office Tower: Linton Grange, Port Elizabeth.33°56′44.22″S 25°30′45.95″E
- Grassridge Transmission Station, Addo - Northern Motherwell.33°43′13.86″S 25°37′58.60″E (Note: A telecommunications tower is also planned to be built on this site.)
- South African Reserve Bank, Port Elizabeth - Market Square, North Union Street.33°57′42.14″S 25°37′27.38″E
- South African Reserve Bank, East London - Cambridge & Union Street.33°00′58.93″S 27°54′22.64″E
- SABC Bhisho - Bhisho Communications Tower: Parliament Hill, Bhisho.32°51′26.05″S 27°25′48.92″E
- EC Provincial Legislature- Independence Avenue, Parliament Hill, Bhisho.32°51′50.57″S 27°25′45.47″E
- OilTanking Grindrod Calulo (Ltd) Port of Ngqura - Port of Ngqura, Coega.33°44′36.64″S 25°40′21.25″E
- Former President Nelson Mandela Qunu Village residence.- N2, Qunu.31°48′21.38″S 28°36′23.09″E

== Free State ==
- Vaaldam - Deneysville.26°52′56.19″S 28°06′57.99″E
- Natref Refinery - Sasolburg26°48′21.11″S 27°51′27.72″E
- Petronet Pump Station, Bethlehem, South Africa - Joubert street 28°13′45.14″S 28°17′53.49″E, Loch Lomond Street28°13′01.32″S 28°18′49.72″E (Note: The list specifically states Pump Station, however both locations are referenced as a pumps station. Signage outside Joubert street location states, "Operations", and Lomond street location states, "Depot". It can be assumed that both locations are included under this single entry.)
- Petrol Pump Station, Coalbrook - Jan Haak road26°48′29.96″S 27°51′06.76″E
- Sasol Pump Station - Bergius Road, Sasolberg.28°49′18.27″S 27°50′53.07″E
- Perseus Transmission Station - North of Dealesville.28°38′09.61″S 25°44′42.38″E
- Centlec Pty (Ltd) Electricity Distribution Station - Bloemfontein29°07′27.12″S 26°13′31.03″E
- SABC Free State (BFN) - SABC Tower, Naval Hill Bloemfontein29°06′12.68″S 26°13′47.47″E
- Kroonstad Pump Station - Gunhill.27°40′38.62″S 27°13′39.07″E
- Lethabo Power Station - Viljoensdrif.26°44′30.35″S 27°58′35.97″E
- South African Reserve Bank, Bloemfontein - Hoffman Square.29°07′04.87″S 26°13′14.62″E
- FS Provincial Legislature, Bloemfontein - Charlotte Maxeke Street.29°07′03.81″S 26°13′11.27″E
- Magdala TPL Depot, (Pump Station) - Edenville.27°33′18.63″S 27°39′59.15″E
- Wilge TPL Depot, (Pump Station) - Frankfort.27°16′51.05″S 28°30′40.69″E

== Northern Cape ==
- Hydra Transmission Station - East of De Aar.30°42′51.54″S 24°05′15.80″E
- SABC Kimberley, Northern Cape - South East of Kimberley.28°51′14.85″S 24°54′17.34″E
- Square Kilometer Array Site (SKA) - 80 km west from the town of Carnarvon. 30°43′16.1″S 21°24′40.1″E
- NC Provincial Legislature - Nobengula Extension, Kimberley.28°44′03.04″S 24°43′12.40″E

== Gauteng ==
- Onderstepoort Biological Products - Old Soutpan Road, Onderstepoort.25°39′01.27″S 28°11′00.83″E
- Union Buildings Presidency - Pretoria.25°44′42.75″S 28°12′43.17″E
- Mahlamba Ndlopfu Presidential Residence - Bryntirion Estate, Pretoria.25°44′16.22″S 28°13′36.23″E
- Sefako Makgatho Presidential Residence - Bryntirion Estate, Pretoria.25°44′23.00″S 28°13′36.00″E
- OR Tambo International airport - Kempton Park.26°08′00.00″S 28°15′00.00″E (Note: According to the National Key Points Act, 1980 only the Air-side and/or apron is covered by the act.)
- SSA Communication Centre - Musanda state security complex, Delmas Road, Rietvlei, Pretoria.25°50′53.05″S 28°18′19.67″E
- Main Telephone Exchange (PPR) - Process Street, Pretoria (TPPR) Exchange.25°44′38.43″S 28°11′12.84″E
- Apollo Transmission Station - Rietvlei.25°55′13.41″S 28°16′33.47″E
- Minerva Transmission Station - Witbos.25°55′13.41″S 28°04′50.86″E
- South African Bank Note Company - 460 Jan van Riebeeck Street, Pretoria North .25°39′39.32″S 28°10′52.74″E
- Denel Dynamics - Nelmapius Drive, Centurion.25°53′22.05″S 28°11′22.74″E
- Pretoria Metal Pressing - 1 Ruth First street.25°45′25.1″S 28°03′38.7″E
- Pretoria Metal Pressing Pta West - WF Nkomo street (previously Church west street), Pretoria West. (Note: Address is listed simply as Church street, Pretoria west in all online references.)
- Denel Land Systems Lyttelton - 368 Selborne Ave, Lyttelton, Centurion.25°48′50.73″S 28°11′44.56″E
- CSIR Wind Tunnel - Meiring Naude Road, Pretoria.25°45′23.29″S 28°16′48.69″E (Note: The CSIR location map and website does not detail in which building on the site that the Wind tunnels are in. The GPS location is best guess, but it could be in any of the buildings on the site.)
- SA Post Office Computer Centre - Unlisted. (Note: In 2010 the SAPO National Control Centre was moved to a new building. A search of online records does not list a location or address for this computer centre.)
- South African Reserve Bank HQSA - 370 Helen Joseph Street, Pretoria.25°44′42.52″S 28°11′48.00″E
- South African Reserve Bank: Pta North - Jan van Riebeeck Street, Pretoria North .25°39′38.57″S 28°10′46.91″E
- New Cooperation Building ID Factory
- SABC Tshwane
- SITA SOC Numerus Building.
- SITA Centurion
- Denel Integrated System Solutions
- SITA Beta
- Government Printing Works (Sec Print Facility)
- Waltloo TPL Depot
- Rheinmetall Denel Munition - Boksburg
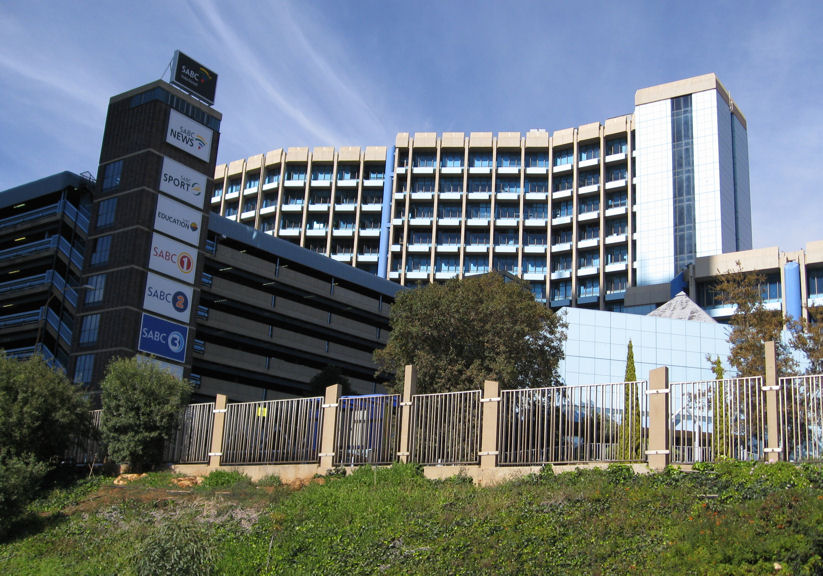
- South African Broadcasting Corporation headquarters in the Johannesburg suburb Uitsaaisentrum, often mistakenly referred to as being located in Auckland Park, which is a suburb bordering on Uitsaaisentrum.
  SABC Building Auckland Park
- Sentech Tower in Brixton, Johannesburg
- SENTECH Transmission & Satellite Center
- Office of Interception Centres
- Eskom National Control Centre, Simmerpan
- City Power Johannesburg Pty (Ltd)
- Grootvlei Power Station
- Former Pres Res NR Mandela GP
- Former, Pres Res T Mbeki GP
- Pres Residence of SA GP
- Gauteng Provincial Legislature
- ArcelorMittal (previously Iscor Ltd) - Delfos Boulevard, Vanderbijlpark.26°39′52.26″S 27°48′48.29″E
- African Explosives Ltd - 1 Platinum Drive, Longmeadow Business Estate.26°06′49.10″S 28°10′52.55″E
- NCP Chlorchem, Chloorkop, Kempton Park
- Denel Aviation
- BAE Systems Benoni - Barnsly Street.26°12′33.92″S 28°18′02.56″E
- South African Mint - Old Johannesburg Road, Centurion.25°54′52.93″S 28°09′26.13″E
- South African Reserve Bank, Johannesburg - 57 Ntemi Piliso Street.26°12′15.02″S 28°02′04.86″E
- Shell Depot Alrode - Hibiscus Street.26°17′37.03″S 28°07′25.86″E
- Chevron Alrode - Garfield Street.26°17′47.25″S 28°07′24.89″E
- Sasol Depot Alrode - Clark Street.26°17′52.47″S 28°07′35.37″E
- Total Depot - Potgieter Street, Alrode.26°18′44.42″S 28°07′40.46″E
- Transnet Pipelines: Alrode - Garfield Street.26°17′53.03″S 28°07′12.18″E
- Chevron Texaco (Caltex) - Caltex House, Keyes Ave, Rosebank.26°08′37.78″S 28°02′10.79″E
- Transnet Pipelines: Airport e-Natis Facility - Jones (Springbok) Road Boksburg.26°09′00.81″S 28°13′33.45″E
- Rand Water: Zwartkopjies - Kromvlei26°21′09.62″S 28°03′32.55″E
- Rand Water: Zuikerbosch - Klipplaatdrift.26°41′40.54″S 28°00′17.16″E26°40′54.86″S 28°00′01.32″E26°40′47.77″S 28°00′34.28″E (Note: The water works is spread across 3 sites.)
- Rand Water: Vereeniging - south of Vereeniging CBD26°41′16.04″S 27°54′56.63″E
- Rand Water: Mapleton - Suidwyk.26°21′30.76″S 28°15′10.82″E
- Rand Water: Barrage - Vaal Barrage.26°45′47.51″S 27°40′58.53″E
- Rand Water: Palmiet - South of Meyersdal.26°18′20.69″S 28°05′27.40″E
- Rand Water: Eikenhof - Eikenhof.26°18′30.45″S 27°58′31.83″E
- Transnet Pipelines Tarlton Distribution Depot - Rustenberg & Ventersdorp Road.26°04′42.81″S 27°38′23.24″E
- Langlaagte Depot - Main Reef Road, Industria.26°12′19.21″S 27°58′54.23″E
- Vaaldam Pump Station - Vaal Marina.26°28′28.78″S 28°05′44.10″E (Note: Exact location of this Pumping station is not certain. GPS cords locate what appears to be a water pumping station on the banks of the Vaaldam)
- Meyerton Depot - Bloemendal, Henly on Klip.26°34′41.32″S 28°06′53.42″E

== North West ==
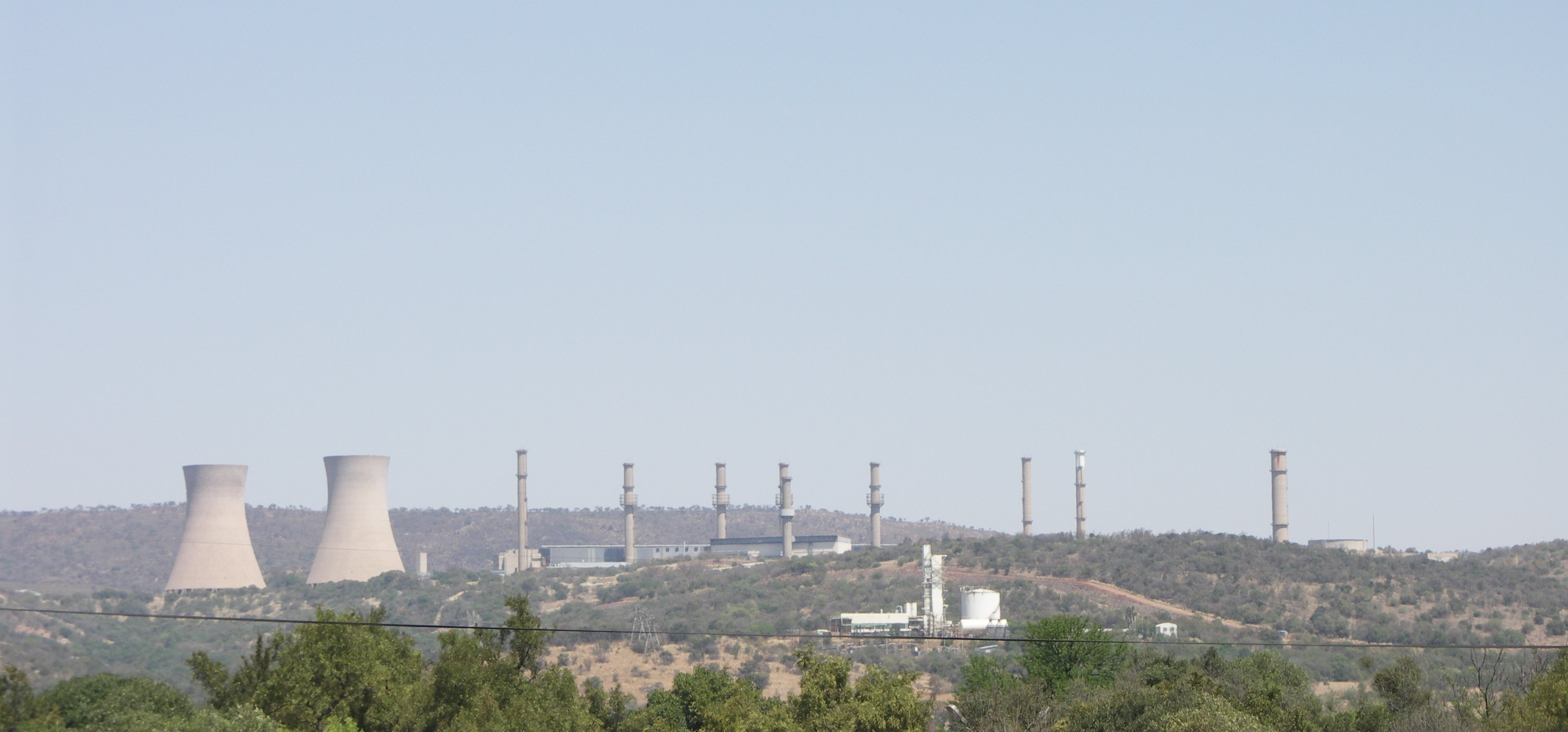
- Pelindaba viewed from the north
  Transnet Pipelines Rustenburg Depot - Eskom Street.25°40′24.47″S 27°15′25.02″E
- North West Provincial Legislature - Dr James Moroka Drive, Mmabatho.25°49′54.86″S 25°36′40.73″E
- Hartebeesthoek Earth Station - Farm No 502, Hartebeesthoek. 25°53′24.11″S 27°41′06.12″E
- NECSA (Nuclear Energy Corporation) - R104 Pelindaba, Brits.25°48′02.80″S 27°56′53.33″E
- SA National Space Agency (SANSA) - Mark Shuttleworth Street, Pretoria (Gauteng).25°44′57.18″S 28°16′04.10″E
- SABC Lt North West - Rustenburg Tower.25°36′58.11″S 27°07′05.35″E
- Klerksdorp Depot - Mahogany Ave, Klerksdorp (North West).26°53′56.51″S 26°39′26.86″E
- Rheinmetall Denel Munition - Boskop (Potchefstroom)

== KwaZulu-Natal ==
- Shukela Mkhungo
- TotalEnergies (Cutler)
- Acacia Operations Services (Heartland Leasing)
- Engen Depot (Cutter)
- Total Depot (Cutler)
- Valvoline Depot (Cutler)
- PD Terminals Depot (Cutler)
- Caleb Brett (Cutler)
- Industrial Oil Processors (Cutler)
- Durban Bulk Shipping (Cutler)
- SA Petroleum Refinery (SAPREF) (Cutler)
- SA Petroleum Refinery (SAPREF) Reunion
- Engen Refinery
- Natcos (Cutler)
- Natcos
- Single Buoy Mooring
- Transnet Pumping Station: Newcastle
- Impala Transmission Station
- Klaarwater Distribution Station
- Pegasus Transmission Station
- Drakensberg Power Station
- Island View Storage (Cutler)
- Caltex Depot (Cutler)
- Zenex Depot (Cutler)
- Durban South Distribution Station
- Transnet Pumping Station - Ladysmith
- Transnet Pumping Station - (Cutler)
- Transnet Pumping Station - Quegga's Nek
- Transnet Pumping Station - Hillcrest - Shongweni Road.29°47′37.34″S 30°45′44.74″E
- Transnet Pumping Station - Howick - Old Main Road, Tweedie.29°28′28.00″S 30°11′13.66″E
- Transnet Pumping Station - Van Reenen
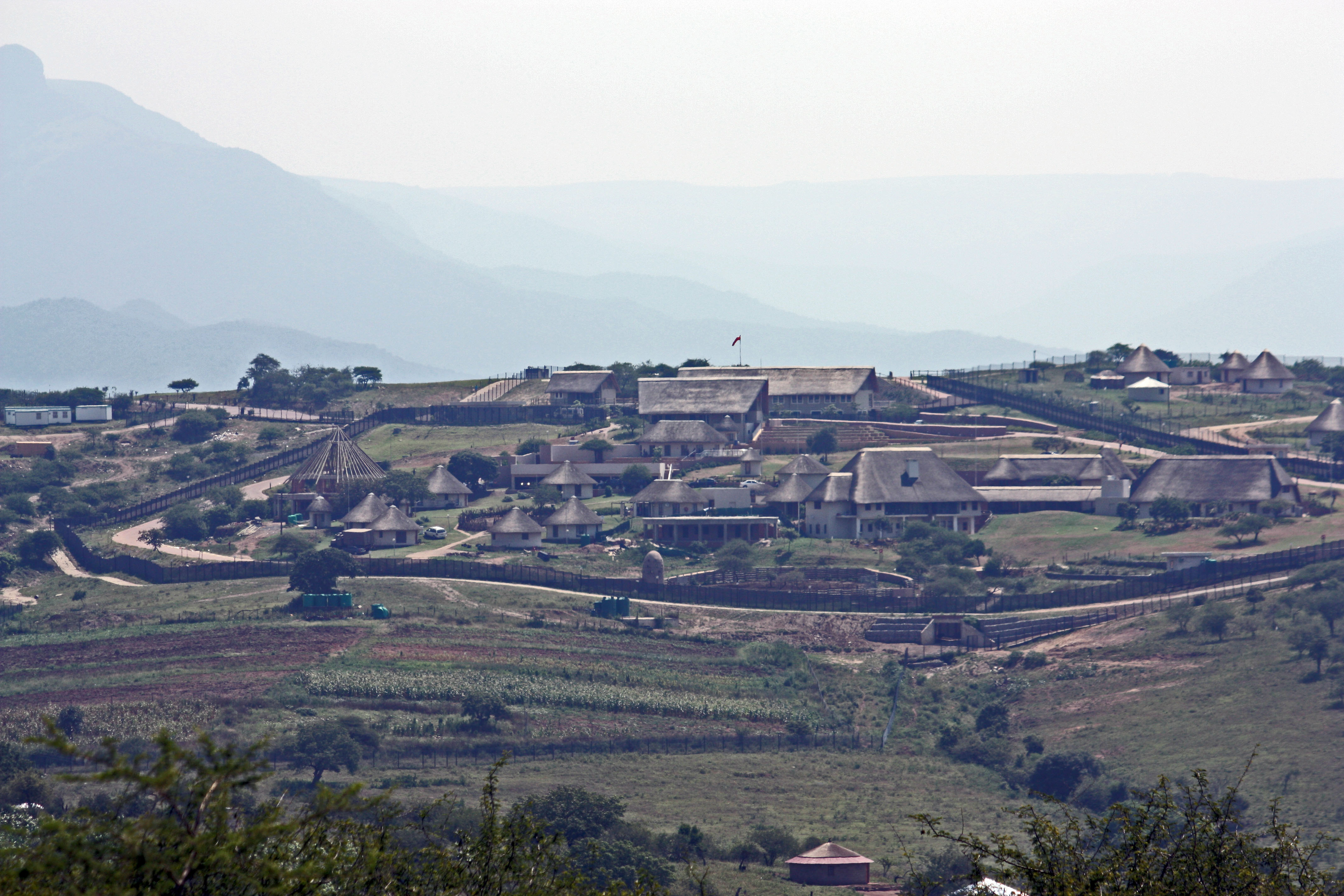
- President Jacob Zuma's Nkandla homestead was declared a National Key Point in 2010.
  President of South Africa Residence - KZN - Nkandla.
- Presidential Res - JL Dube House
- New Aviation Fuel Depot at KSIA
- King Shaka International Airport Air Side
- Durban North Distribution Station
- Athene Transmission Station
- Lotus Park Distribution station
- South African Reserve Bank: Durban - 8 Dr A B Xuma St.29°51′20.24″S 31°01′41.19″E
- Duzi TPL Depot- Ottos Bluff road, Pietermaritzburg 29°31′55.00″S 30°22′19.23″E
- Mooi River TPL Depot
- Fortmistake TPL Ladysmith
- Mngeni TPL Depot
- Mnambithi TPL Depot
- Ntwini TPL Depot
- Hilltop TPL Depot
- KZN Provincial Legislature

== Mpumalanga ==
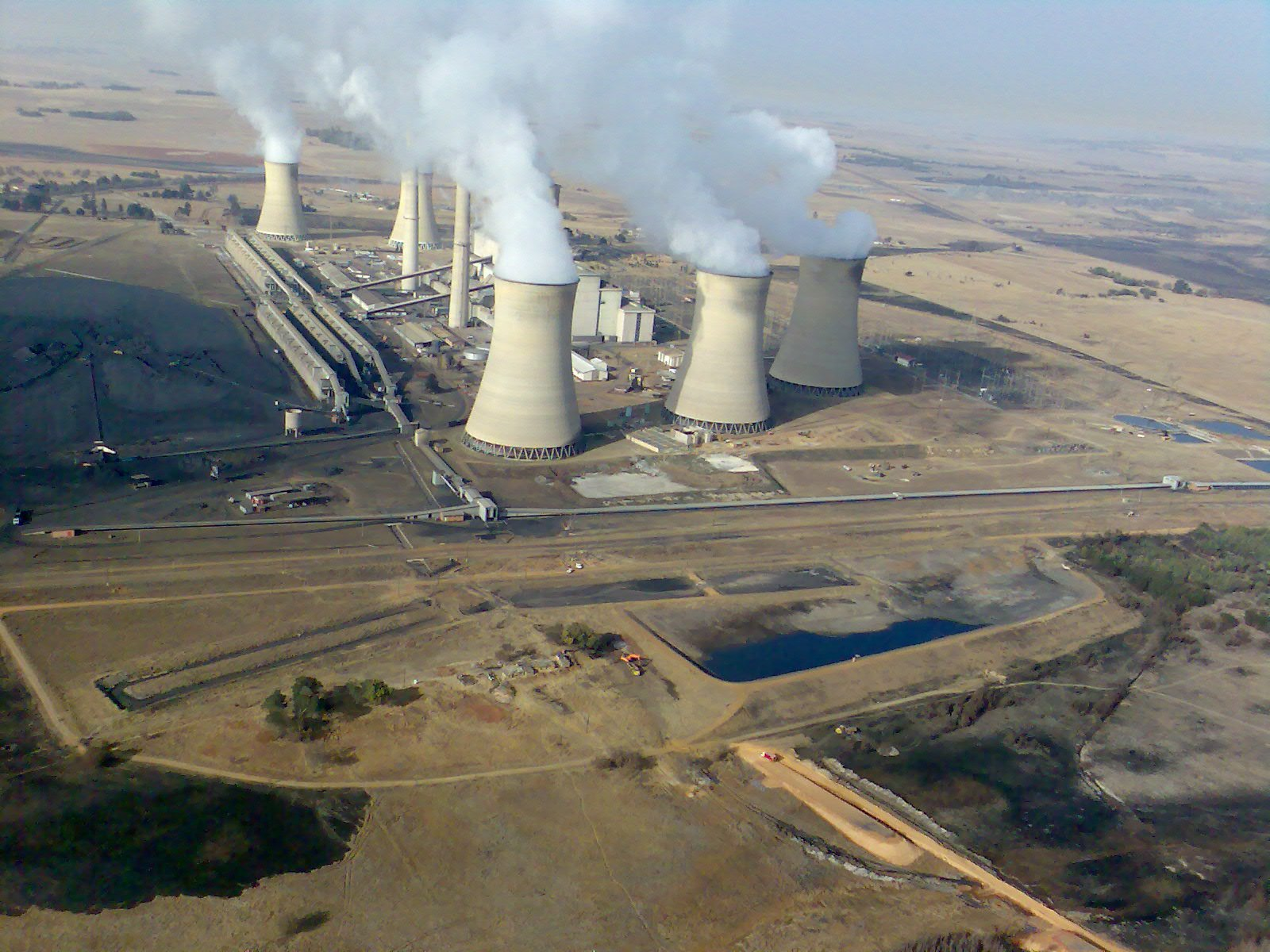
- Arnot Power Station near Middelburg in Mpumalanga
  Grootdraai Pumping Station
- SABC, Mbombela
- Camden Power Station - Camden.26°37′14.87″S 30°05′24.39″E
- Hendrina Power Station
- Kriel Power Station
- Arnot Power Station - ReitKuil.25°56′39.68″S 29°47′26.25″E
- Sol Transmission Station
- Kusile Power Station
- Matla Power Station
- Duvha Power Station
- Tutuka Power Station
- Kendal Power Station
- Komati Power Station
- Majuba Power Station
- Mpumalanga Boulevard Riverside Gov Building, Riverside, Mbombela
- Transnet Pipeline, Kendal
- Sasol Secunda
- Transnet Pipelines, Secunda
- Jericho Pump Station
- Rieftontein Pump Station
- Grootfontein Pump Station
- Vygeboom Pump Station
- Bosloop Water Pump Station
- Nooitgedact Pump Station
- Transnet Pipeline Witbank Depot
- Khutala Pump Station
- Zaaihoek Pump Station
- Knoppies Tower

== Limpopo ==
- SABC, Polokwane - East of Mokopane. - 24°09′26.11″S 29°14′09.18″E
- Mokolo Pump Station, Limpopo Prov - Mokolo Dam. - 23°58′03.00″S 27°40′47.64″E
- Matimba Power Station - Marapong.- 23°40′09.61″S 27°36′45.38″E
- Medupi Power Station - Marapong - 23°42′S 27°33′E
- Limpopo Legislature, Lebowakgomo, Polokwane - Lebowakgomo Government Complex.23°54′44.88″S 29°27′21.17″E

== Western Cape ==
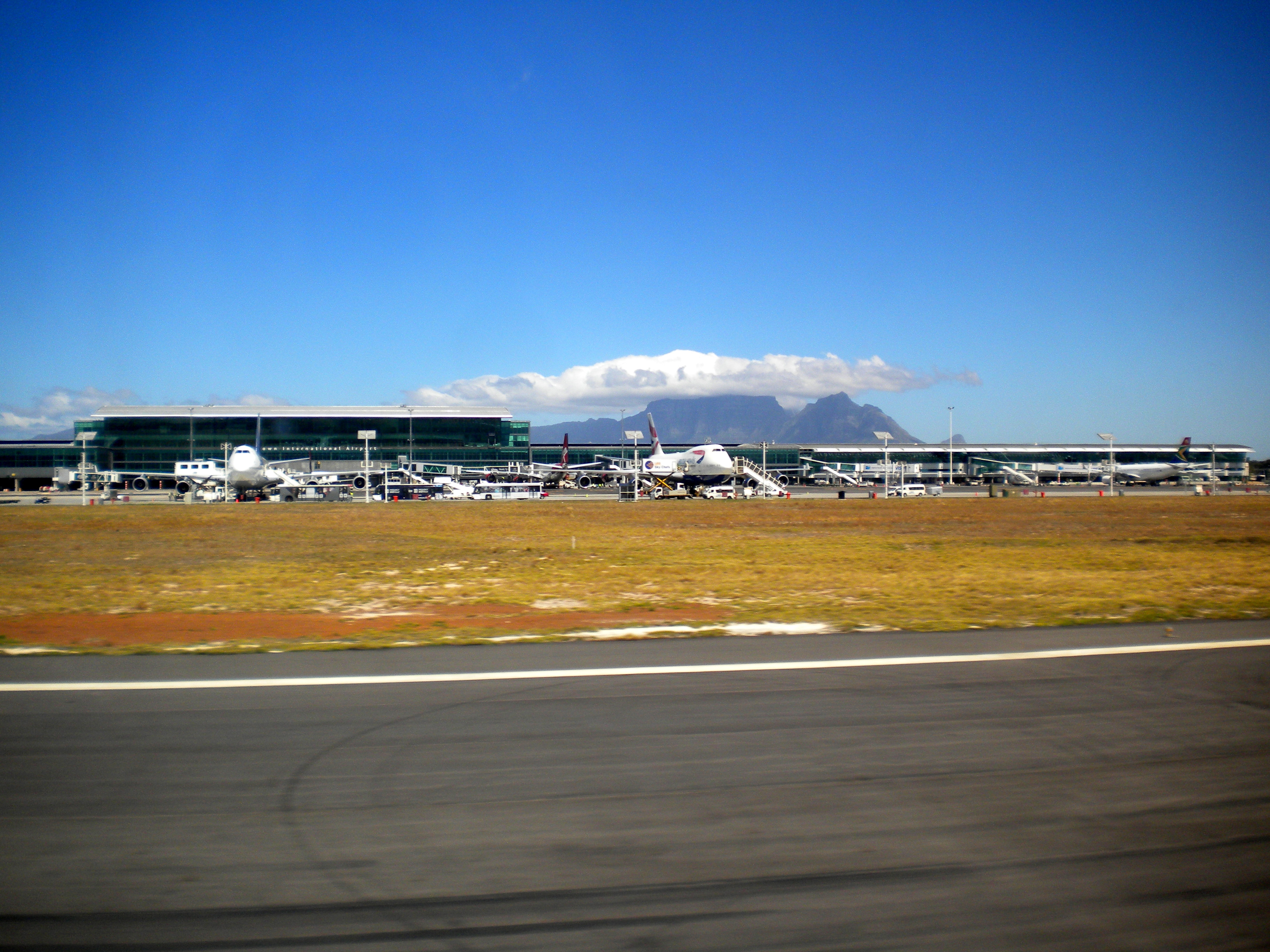
Airport and Table Mountain as viewed from the runway upon take-off.

- Houses of Parliament - Parliament Street, Cape Town.33°55′32.96″S 18°25′11.00″E
- 120 Plein Street, Cape Town - Parliament of South Africa.33°55′36.55″S 18°25′36.55″E
- Cape Town International Airport - 33°58′18.00″S 18°36′14.00″E
- SABC Ltd Western Cape
- Chevron Refinery, Cape Town
- Saldanha Tank Farm - Port of Saldanha Bay.32°59′49.10″S 18°00′43.21″E (Note: This is the Expected Construction site of the tank farm as described. Once construction is underway, the location can be confirmed.)
- Muldersvlei Transmission Station
- Acasia Transmission Station
- Droeriver Transmission Station
- Koeberg Nuclear Power Station
- RDM Somerset West
- RDM Wellington
- PetroSA Voorbaai - Mossel Bay.34°08′49.32″S 22°06′30.84″E
- South African Reserve Bank, Cape Town - 25 Burg Street.33°55′19.31″S 18°25′17.16″E
- PetroSA GTL Refinery - Mossel Bay.34°10′03.41″S 22°59′12.80″E
- Single point mooring buoy Voorbaai - Mossel Bay. (Note: GPS location of buoy is approximate.)34°08′37.62″S 22°08′37.31″E
- Klipheuwel Pumping Station
- FA Production Platform, Mossgas - 85 km South of Mossel Bay. (Note: GPS location of off shore facility is approximate.)34°58′12.00″S 22°10′12.00″E
- ORCA - Floating production storage and offloading facility:120 km South-West of Mossel Bay.35°05′42.10″S 22°52′08.85″E
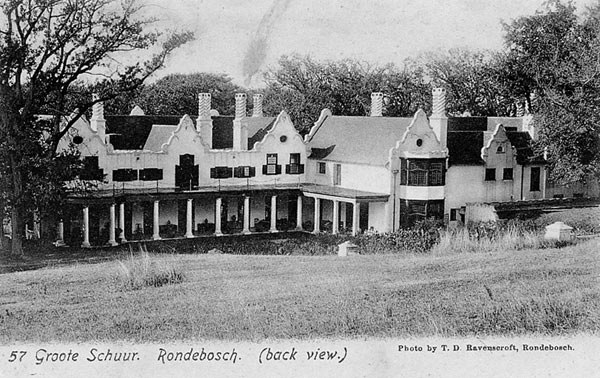
- View of the rear of Groote Schuur, c1905.
  Presidential Residence (Genadendal) - Groote Schuur.33°57′49.61″S 18°27′50.40″E
- Former Pres Res FW de Klerk (Sea Point)
- Former Pres Res NR Mandela (Bishops Court)
- Office of the Pres of SA (Tuynhuys)
- SABC: Air Time: Cape Town
- Western Cape Provincial Legislature - 7 Wale Street, Cape Town.33°55′26.96″S 18°25′05.79″E
- Gourikwa Power Station - Mossel Bay.34°10′00.00″S 21°57′38.40″E
- SFF Association Storage - Port of Saldanha Bay.33°00′27.41″S 18°02′43.75″E
- Ankerlig Power Station - Atlantis.33°35′26.23″S 18°27′43.54″E
- SFF Oil Jetty - Port of Saldanha Bay.33°01′49.08″S 17°59′05.77″E
