= List of thermal power station failures =

This list is concerned with severe and abnormal power outages which caused major power failures due to damage to a single thermal power station itself or its connections which take a significant amount of time - months or years to repair.

Whilst any electric grid is vulnerable to instability after the loss of a large generating source or transmission line, this can generally be dealt with without serious inconvenience to customers. However some power stations can be exceptionally large in respect to connected grid capacity so that any failure for these proportionally large stations can be more problematic than the failure of a typically sized station.

== List of failures ==
Plant	Location	Description	Year	Reference
Vasilikos Power Station	Cyprus	427.5 MW power generation loss, due to munitions explosions. Widespread continuous power shortages	2011	
Ferrybridge C	United Kingdom	2000 MW power generation loss, due to cooling tower collapse. No serious impact on National Grid	1 November 1965	
Tilbury	United Kingdom	750 MW power generation loss, due to fuel fire February 2012. No serious impact on National Grid	1 February 2012	
Shoreham	United Kingdom	1000 MW power generation loss, due to fuel fire February 2012. No serious impact on National Grid	February 2012	
Arnot Power Station	South Africa	Up to 2352 MW Caused by unit breakdowns, leading to implementation of Loadshedding	2007–Present	
Camden Power Station	South Africa	Up To 1561 MW Caused by unit breakdowns, leading to implementation of Loadshedding	2007–Present	
Duvha Power Station	South Africa	Up To 3600 MW Caused by unit breakdowns, leading to implementation of Loadshedding	2007–Present	
Grootvlei Power Station	South Africa	Up To 1180 MW Caused by unit breakdowns, leading to implementation of Loadshedding	2007–Present	
Hendrina Power Station	South Africa	Up To 1893 MW Caused by unit breakdowns, leading to implementation of Loadshedding	2007–Present	
Kelvin Power Station	South Africa	Up To 214 MW Caused by unit breakdowns, leading to implementation of Loadshedding	2007–Present	
Kendal Power Station	South Africa	Up To 4116 MW Caused by unit breakdowns, leading to implementation of Loadshedding	2007–Present	
Komati Power Station	South Africa	Up To 990 MW Caused by unit breakdowns, leading to implementation of Loadshedding	2007–Present	
Kriel Power Station	South Africa	Up To 3000 MW Caused by unit breakdowns, leading to implementation of Loadshedding	2007–Present	
Kusile Power Station	South Africa	Up To 4800 MW Caused by unit breakdowns, leading to implementation of Loadshedding	2017–Present	
Lethabo Power Station	South Africa	Up To 3708 MW Caused by unit breakdowns, leading to implementation of Loadshedding	2007–Present	
Majuba Power Station	South Africa	Up To 4110 MW Caused by unit breakdowns, leading to implementation of Loadshedding	2007–Present	
Matimba Power Station	South Africa	Up To 3990 MW Caused by unit breakdowns, leading to implementation of Loadshedding	2007–Present	
Matla Power Station	South Africa	Up To 3600 MW Caused by unit breakdowns, leading to implementation of Loadshedding	2007–Present	
Medupi Power Station	South Africa	Up To 4764 MW Caused by unit breakdowns, leading to implementation of Loadshedding	2015–Present	
Rooiwal Power Station	South Africa	Up To 300 MW Caused by unit breakdowns, leading to implementation of Loadshedding	2007–Present	
Tutuka Power Station	South Africa	Up To 3654 MW Caused by unit breakdowns, leading to implementation of Loadshedding	2007–Present	

== See also ==
- Dam failure
- List of power outages
- Hydroelectricity
- List of hydroelectric power station failures
- Thermal power station
