= South African energy crisis =

Widespread national level rolling blackouts

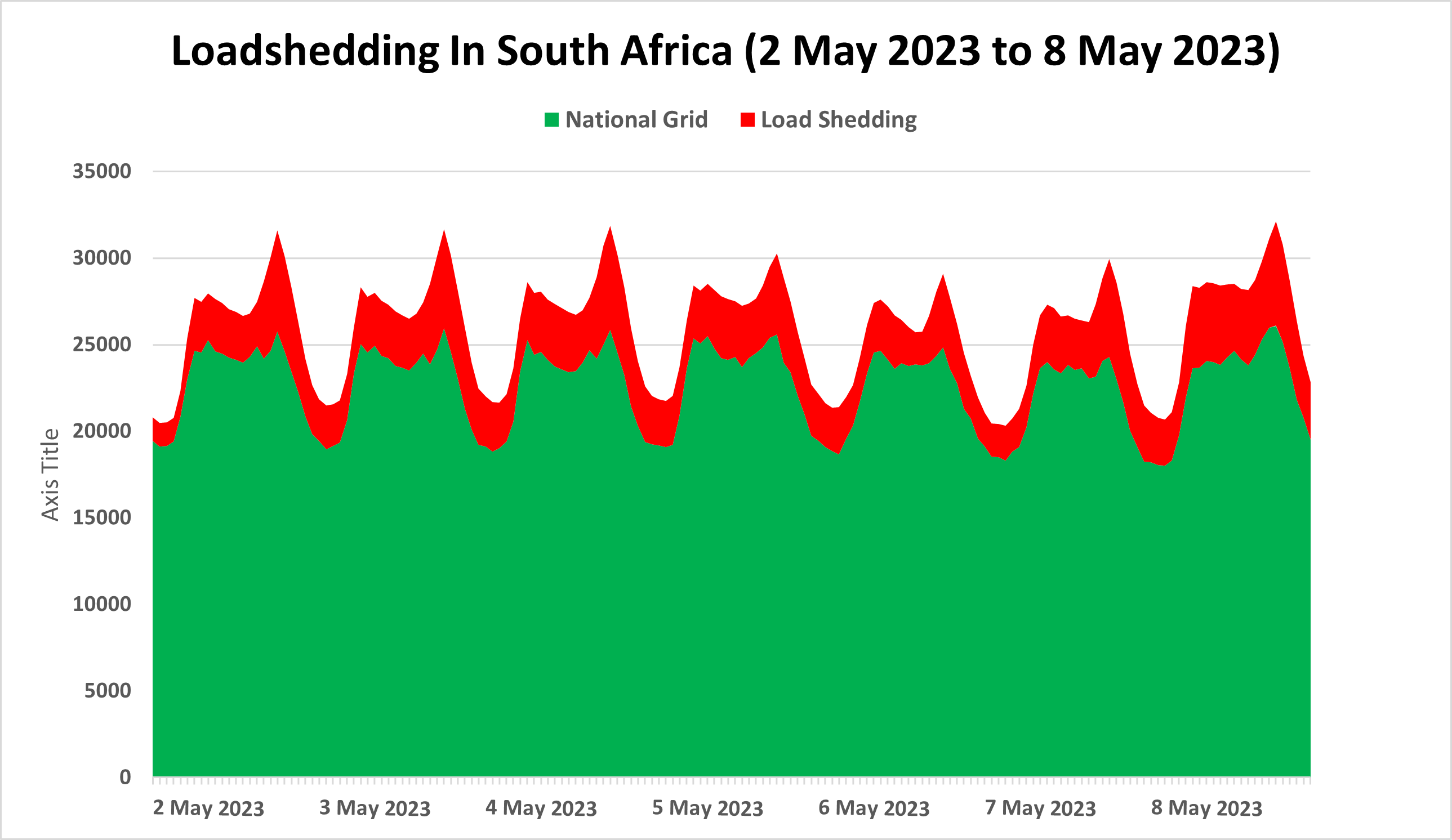
Eskom Loadshedding Compared to Energy Produced in 2023

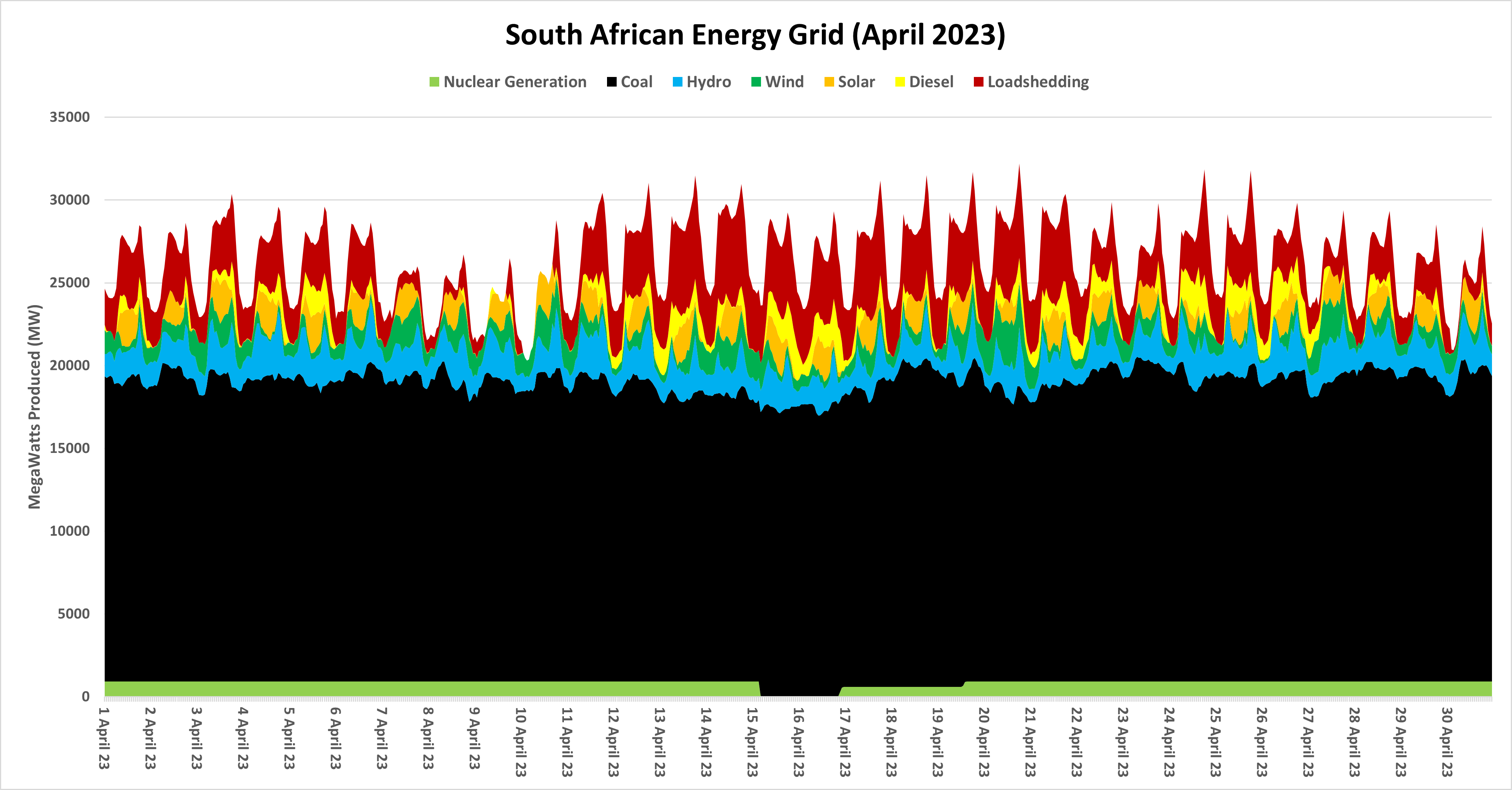
Eskom Nation Grid Production by Source in April 2023, rolling blackouts seen in Red

South Africa's energy crisis (or load shedding) was a period of widespread national power outages that began at the end of 2007 and last occurred on 16 May 2025. The South African government-owned national power utility, and primary power generator, Eskom, and various parliamentarians have attributed these rolling blackouts to insufficient generation capacity.

According to Eskom and government officials, the solution requires the construction of additional power stations and generators. However, corruption and mismanagement of Eskom, most notably during the Jacob Zuma administration, has exacerbated the energy crisis; while neglect by Eskom staff, multiple acts of sabotage, and the activity of criminal syndicates within Eskom with alleged political connections have also contributed to ongoing power supply problems. Many South African commentators have described the ongoing energy crisis as a symptom of long-standing poor governance.

In April 2024, South Africa had a full month without rotational power cuts, which was the first time since January 2022. However, load shedding and scheduled rolling blackouts returned at the end of January 2025.

South Africa has not had load shedding since May 16, 2025.

== Background ==
Power station maximum generating capacity as of 2019
1. Coal (83.0%)
2. Pumped Storage (6.00%)
3. Gas (5.00%)
4. Nuclear (4.00%)
5. Hydro (2.00%)
6. Wind (0.20%)

In a December 1998 report, analysts and leaders in Eskom and in the South African government predicted that Eskom would run out of electrical power reserves by 2007 unless action was taken to prevent it. To improve power supply and reliability, the 1998 report recommended restructuring Eskom into separate electricity generation and power transmission businesses. Despite the warnings of the 1998 report and requests by Eskom to be allowed to increase capacity, the national government took no action. At the time the Mbeki government was considering the privatisation of Eskom which was cited as a reason why the government took no action. This resulted in Eskom being unable to add additional generating capacity and thereby keep up with increasing national demand for electricity from 2002 onward. The government only granted Eskom permission to significantly expand energy production (by 70%) in 2004.

=== Aging infrastructure ===
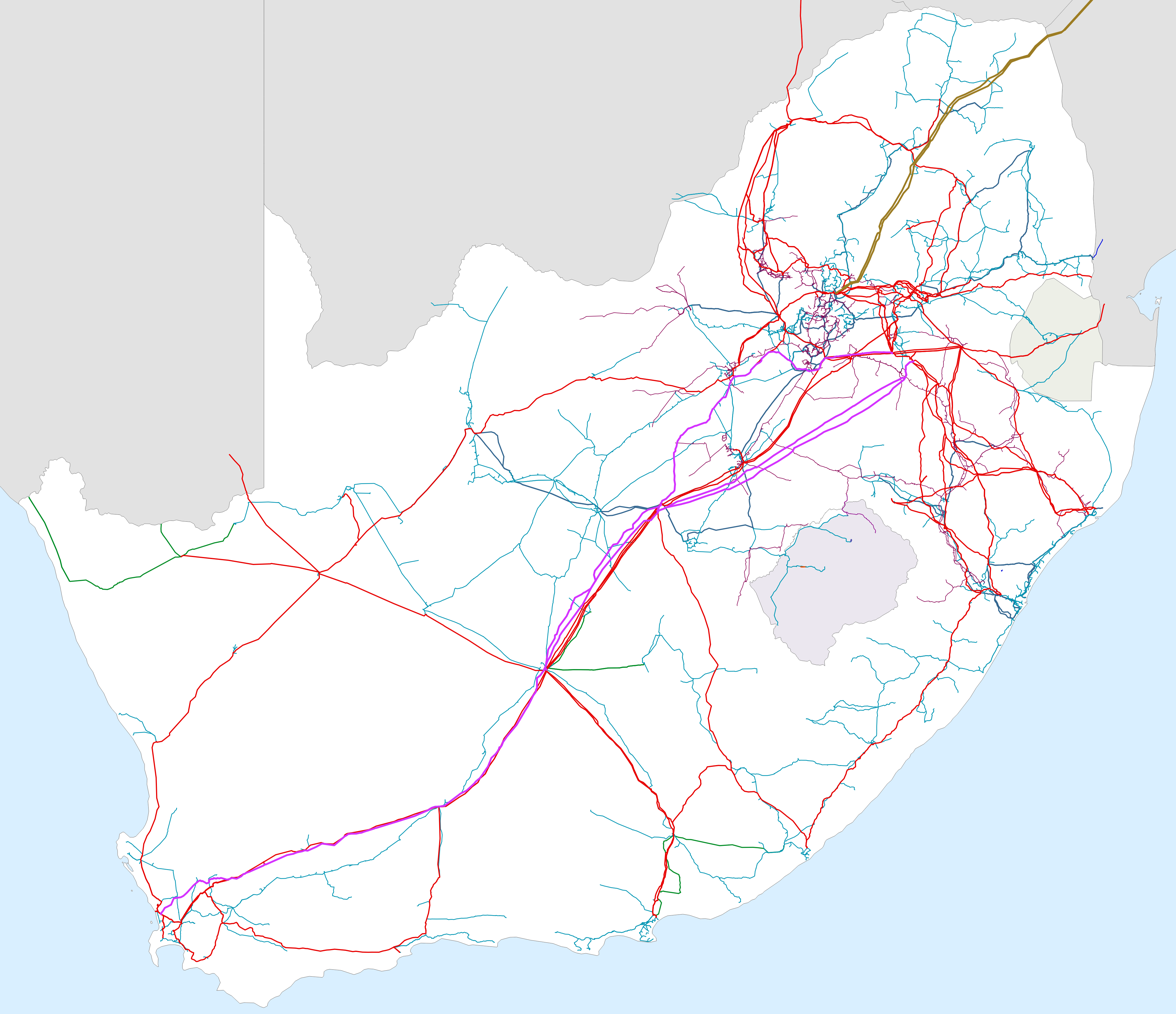
Power transmission grid of South Africa in 2022. Pink: 765 kV; Red: 400 kV; Brown: 533 kV HVDC power line from Cahora Bassa, Blue: less than 300 kV

Fifteen power stations were commissioned between 1961 and 1996, adding a combined 35,804 MW of capacity. In the 21st century, only 9,564 MW of capacity has been added from the currently constructing power stations Medupi and Kusile. Many Eskom power stations are almost 50 years old and near decommissioning. Following the first period of load shedding in 2007 to 2008 Eskom commissioned the construction of the Medupi and Kusile coal fired power plants to expand energy production by 25%. The construction of these plants encountered numerous technical problems and cost overruns whilst the existing fleet of power plants were not replaced and continued to operate past their operational lifespan.

==== Power station commission history ====
Below is a timeline of Eskom-built, major power stations

Year	Power plant	Megawatts
1961	Komati	990
1963	Rooiwal	300
1967	Camden	1561
1969	Grootvlei	1180
1970	Hendrina	1893
1971	Arnot	2352
1976	Kriel	3000
1979	Matla	3600
1980	Duvha	3600
1984	Koeberg	1860
1985	Tutuka	3654
1985	Lethabo	3708
1987	Matimba	3990
1988	Kendal	4116
1996	Majuba	4110
2015	Medupi	4764
2017	Kusile	4800

== Loadshedding ==
Eskom Power generation on 27 June 2022. Loadshedding indicated as Orange, showing how Eskom cannot generate peak demand

In South Africa, loadshedding has been a recurring problem for many years, and one of its main causes is the country's heavy reliance on aging coal-fired power plants. These plants often require maintenance, resulting in breakdowns and unplanned outages that reduce the amount of electricity available to the grid. In addition, the country's coal supply has been unreliable due to operational issues and disruptions caused by labor strikes.

To address this problem, South Africa has been working to shift its energy mix from coal to renewable energy sources such as wind and solar power. This transition has been slow, but there has been progress in recent years, with the government's commitment to procuring renewable energy and reducing the country's greenhouse gas emissions. However, the shift to renewable energy is not without its challenges. The intermittency of wind and solar power means that power supply can be variable, and the power generated is not always available at times of high demand.

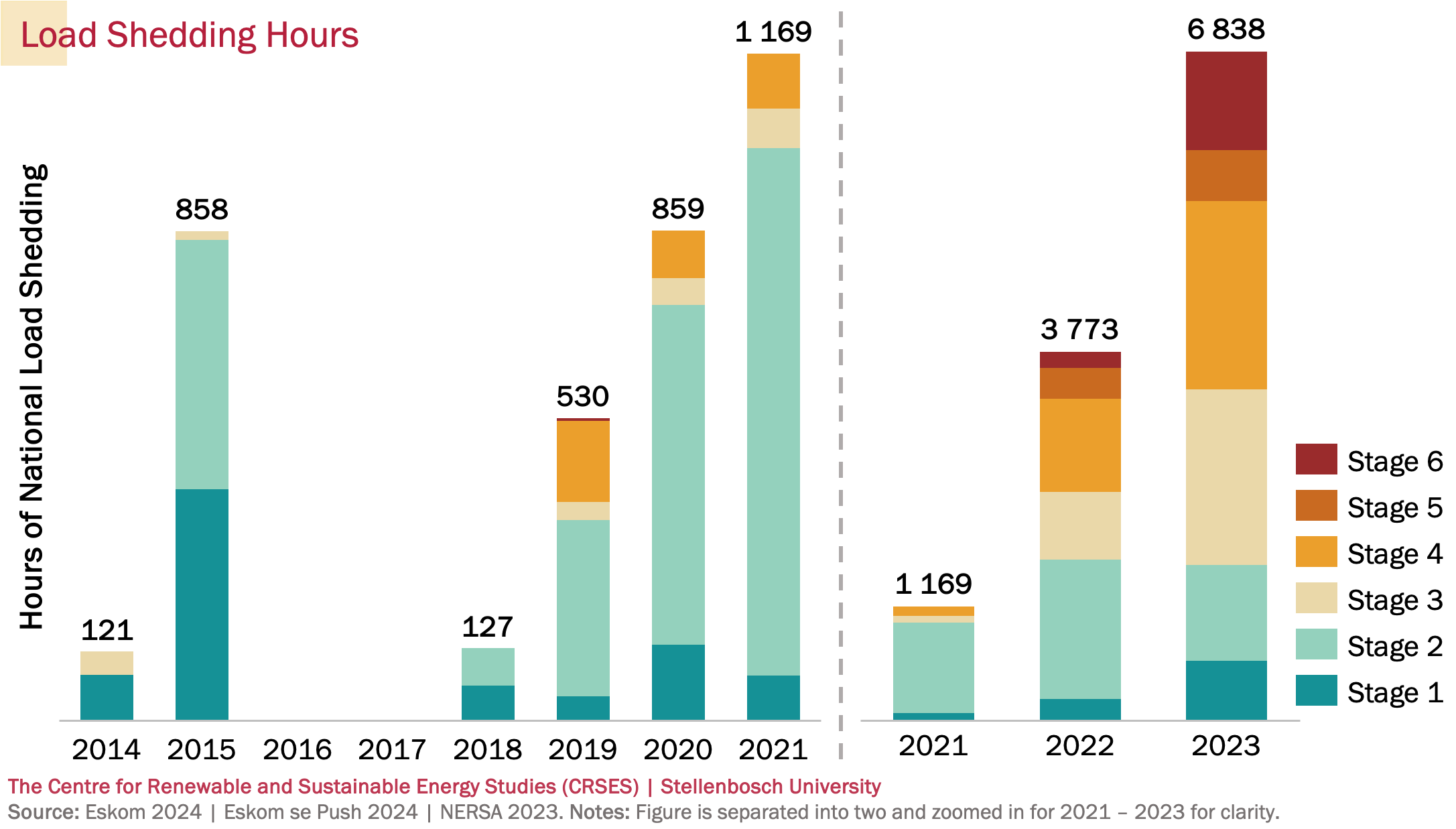
Hours of load shedding in South Africa by stage 2014–2023

Since 2007, South Africa has experienced multiple periods of loadshedding as the country's demand for electricity exceeded its ability, notably Eskom's ability, to supply it. During these periods the power is rationed between different electrical grid areas across the country and within municipal areas. With areas experiencing power outages typically lasting two to four hours. Although South Africa has a national grid some areas of the country experience more periods of loadshedding than other areas due to differences in local power generation capabilities and difficulties in electrical distribution.

As of December 2019, Eskom have published 8 stages of load shedding, each stage representing the removal of 1000 MW increments of demand by controlled shut down on sections of the supply grid based on a predetermined schedule. Schedules may vary by location. Stage 6 (6000 MW reduction) was implemented for the first time on 9 December 2019.

Stages of loadshedding and their impact on the end user
Stage	Energy load removed from the national grid	Typical Impact	Percentage of grid users without power	An example loadshedding area in Cape Town might experience power cuts at the following times
Stage 1	<1000 MW	6h over 4 days (6/96h)	~6% without power	16:00–18:30
Stage 2	<2000 MW	12h over 4 days (12/96h)	~12.5% without power	00:00–02:30 & 16:00–18:30
Stage 3	<3000 MW	18h over 4 days (18/96h)	~19% without power	00:00–02:30 & 16:00–18:30
Stage 4	<4000 MW	24h over 4 days (24/96h)	~25% without power	00:00–02:30 & 08:00–10:30 & 16:00–18:30
Stage 5	<5000 MW	30h over 4 days (30/96h)	~31% without power	00:00–02:30 & 08:00–10:30 & 14:00–18:30
Stage 6	<6000 MW	36h over 4 days (36/96h)	~37% without power	00:00–02:30 & 08:00–10:30 & 14:00–18:30
Stage 7	<7000 MW	42h over 4 days (42/96h)	~44% without power	00:00–02:30 & 08:00–10:30 & 14:00–18:30 & 22:00–00:30
Stage 8	<8000 MW	48h over 4 days (48/96h)	~50% without power	

After the 2 hour disconnect period there is typically an additional 30 minutes added to allow for switching on, not counted in the totals as mentioned above. Problems may arise during switch on that can cause an actual fault blackout in the area beyond the scheduled time.

== Sabotage and corruption ==
Sabotage and corruption at the state owned energy utility Eskom and its suppliers have prolonged and deepened the energy crisis by limiting the country's ability to maintain existing power generating capacity and increasing expenses.

On 19 November 2021, Eskom announced that sabotage of electrical infrastructure, as well as corruption, might be contributing to power supply problems. An initial forensic investigation found evidence that recent damage to a coal conveyor at Lethabo was the result of deliberate sabotage. Steel supports had been severed, causing a power supply pylon to collapse. In a media briefing, de Ruyter commented that the matter had been referred to the Hawks for further investigation. Despite investigations and disciplinary action, acts of sabotage continued into May 2022, when it was revealed that multiple incidents had occurred at several plants. In May 2022, the Minister for Public Enterprises, Pravin Gordhan, reported to Parliament that additional incidents of cables being cut intentionally by saboteurs, rising theft at its power plants, and corruption around the supply of fuel oil, had greatly worsened the energy crisis and Eskom's ability to resolve it. South African journalist Kyle Cowan has speculated that these acts of sabotage were politically motivated by unknown groups or individuals within Eskom involved in corruption.

In December 2022, President Ramaphosa's spokesperson announced that the South African National Defence Force would be deployed at four Eskom power stations "in response to the growing threat of sabotage, theft, vandalism and corruption" for an indeterminate length of time. In late February 2023, then Eskom CEO, André de Ruyter, controversially stated that four criminal syndicates had established themselves within the national utility, that an unnamed senior ANC MP was involved, and that the government lacked the political will to resolve the situation. De Ruyter also stated that in his opinion "load shedding is, to a large extent, attributable to crime and corruption."

== Loadshedding periods ==
Since 2007, South Africa has experienced at least five distinct periods of load shedding.

=== First period: 2007–2008 ===
The first period of chronic power shortages occurred in late 2007 and lasted until at least May 2008. Investigative television show Carte Blanche reported that part of the problem is related to the supply of coal to the coal-fired power plants. Several other causes have been postulated, including skills shortages and increasing demand for electricity around the country. Daily load shedding occurred for the first time for two weeks in January 2008.

Eskom was criticised for exporting electricity to neighbouring African states while not having the capacity to meet South Africa's demand. Eskom, however, announced on 20 January 2008 that it had ceased to export power. The government claimed the shortage had caught them by surprise since the South African economy had grown faster than expected; however, their target growth rate of 6% per year was not reached from 1996 to 2004. The average GDP growth rate during this period was 3.1%. The year 2012 was frequently mentioned as the earliest possible end to the power shortages.

=== Second period: November 2014 – February 2015 ===
The Majuba power plant lost its capacity to generate power after a collapse of one of its coal storage silos on 1 November 2014. The Majuba power plant delivered approximately 10% of the country's entire capacity and the collapse halted the delivery of coal to the plant. A second silo developed a major crack on 20 November causing the shut down of the plant again, after temporary measures were instituted to deliver coal to the plant.

On 5 December 2014, Eskom started major stage three load shedding in South Africa after the shut down of two power plants on 4 November (of said year) due to diesel shortages. It was also reported that the Palmiet and Drakensberg Pumped Storage Schemes were also experiencing difficulties due to a depletion of water reserve to the Hydro plants. Stage three was the highest degree of load shedding then.

On Thursday 5 November, Eskom fell 4,000 megawatts (5,400,000 hp) short of the country's electricity demand of 28,000 megawatts (38,000,000 hp). The power utility has the ability to produce 45,583 megawatts (61,128,000 hp) but could only supply 24,000 megawatts (32,000,000 hp) due to "planned and unplanned" maintenance. One turbine at Eskom's Duvha Power Station is still out of commission due to an "unexplained incident" in March 2014. Load shedding was scheduled to resume in February 2015, due to industry start up, after the December holiday period.

=== Third period: February 2019 – March 2019 ===
Another period of load shedding began in February 2019 when Eskom announced level 4 load shedding due to the temporary loss of generating capacity. This necessitated the dropping of 4,000 MW of power consumption from the national grid. In mid-March of that year extensive ongoing power cuts were implemented across the country by Eskom as part of the level 4 load shedding.

=== Fourth period: December 2019 – March 2020 ===
Eskom implemented a further round of load shedding commencing in December 2019. South Africa is currently experiencing its worst energy crisis, when Load Shedding Stage 6 activated for the first time ever in December. Eskom stated that of its total nominal capacity of around 44,000 MW, it was unable to provide around 13,000 MW of total capacity, resulting in the nationwide blackouts.

A combination of factors were blamed for the fourth period of load shedding ranging from weather to allegations of sabotage and neglect. Unusually heavy rains in the highveld region of South Africa resulted in wet coal and flooding leading to a number of plants being unable to operate effectively, most notably at Medupi power station. This was exacerbated by bad coal management practices. President Cyril Ramaphosa stated that an additional reason for the load shedding was the loss of 2,000 MW due to alleged sabotage by an Eskom employee. Eskom chief operations officer, Jan Oberholzer, publicly stated that the primary reason for load shedding was due to a lack of maintenance and neglect over the preceding twelve years resulting in an unpredictable and unreliable system. South African opposition parties criticized the African National Congress and President Ramaphosa for the way in which they handled the crisis. An additional round of load shedding (stage 4) was initiated in March 2020 when the Koeberg Nuclear power station experienced a fault with one of the sea water cooling pumps.

=== Fifth period: March 2021 – March 2024 ===
During the COVID-19 pandemic and resulting economic slowdown load shedding was largely suspended due to reduced demand for electricity. This ended in March 2021, when Matimba, Tutuka, Majuba, Kusile, Duvha, Kriel, Kendal and Medupi power stations experienced breakdowns. In May 2021, stage 2 load-shedding was reimplemented following multiple power station breakdowns at Tutuka, Majuba, Kriel, Matla, Kusile, Medupi and the Duvha power stations. By 9 June 2021 level 4 load shedding was announced.

On 10 June 2021 President Ramaphosa announced that the Electricity Regulation Act would be amended to increase the threshold for exemption from applying for a license from national energy regulator Nersa to generate electricity, thereby increasing the exemption threshold from 1 megawatt to 100 megawatts. This would allow private power producers to more easily add power production capacity to the national grid.

After providing uninterrupted power for 77 days, Eskom announced on 7 October 2021 that stage 2 load shedding would resume due to planned and unplanned outages.

On 25 October 2021, Eskom announced that capacity would remain "constrained" through August 2022, with negative effects on the economy. Eskom also estimated that an additional 4000MW to 6000MW of generation capacity would be required to remove the risk of loadshedding. On 27 October 2021 Eskom announced that stage 4 load shedding would be implemented for three days due to problems with the Medupi, Kusile, Matla, Lethabo and Arnot power stations. That same day, the governing party of South Africa, the African National Congress (ANC) spokesperson Pule Mabe raised concerns that the recent load shedding schedule may be politically motivated, given the upcoming 2021 municipal elections.

Following the 2021 municipal elections, stage 4 load shedding recommenced on 5 November due to problems at Kendal, Tutuka, Matimba, Majuba and Lethabo power stations. In a post-election address on 8 November, President Ramaphosa remarked that the continuing reliance on Eskom, as the sole national generator, was a central risk to the power supply system.

Eskom announced that level 2 load shedding would be re-implemented from 2 to 7 February 2022 due to the breakdown of two generating units at the Kusile and Kendal power stations. In early March 2022 level 4 load shedding was announced due to breakdowns taking 15,439MW out of the national grid. Stage 4 load shedding was extended over the 2022 Easter weekend when roughly half the national grid failed.

==== June 2022 strike ====
Load shedding increased to level 4 and then level 6 nationally in late June 2022 following unlawful strike action by NUMSA and NUM employees. The loss of generating capacity due to strike action was in addition to a loss of 2,766MW from planned maintenance and another 17,395MW from power station breakdowns. As the strike action continued Eskom warned that it might be necessary to implement stage 6 load shedding. On 28 June 2022, Eskom confirmed that stage six load shedding would be implemented that evening, only the second time since December 2019. By the end of June the strike was effectively ended when Eskom agreed to restart wage negotiations.

==== September 2022 crisis ====
In mid-September 2022, South Africa's energy grid experienced a collapse in generating capacity which resulted in up to half of Eskom's generating capacity being lost. Eskom announced that due to fires and a broken coal conveyor belt at Kendal power station, and an electrical trip during testing at Koeberg Nuclear power station level 4 load shedding would be implemented; a week later level 5 load shedding was declared. The day after the implementation of level 5 loadshedding was announced generators at the Kusile and Kriel power stations tripped thereby forcing Eskom to implement level 6 loadshedding with the prospect of level 8 being implemented.

On 7 December 2022, level 6 load shedding was reimposed when over 20,000MW of generation was taken off line due to a high number of power station breakdowns. It was reported that level 7 load shedding might begin if planned maintenance was implemented, that would take one of Koeberg's nuclear reactors offline.

By the end of 2022, South Africans experienced more than 200 days of power cuts, the most in a calendar year to date.

==== 2023 crisis ====
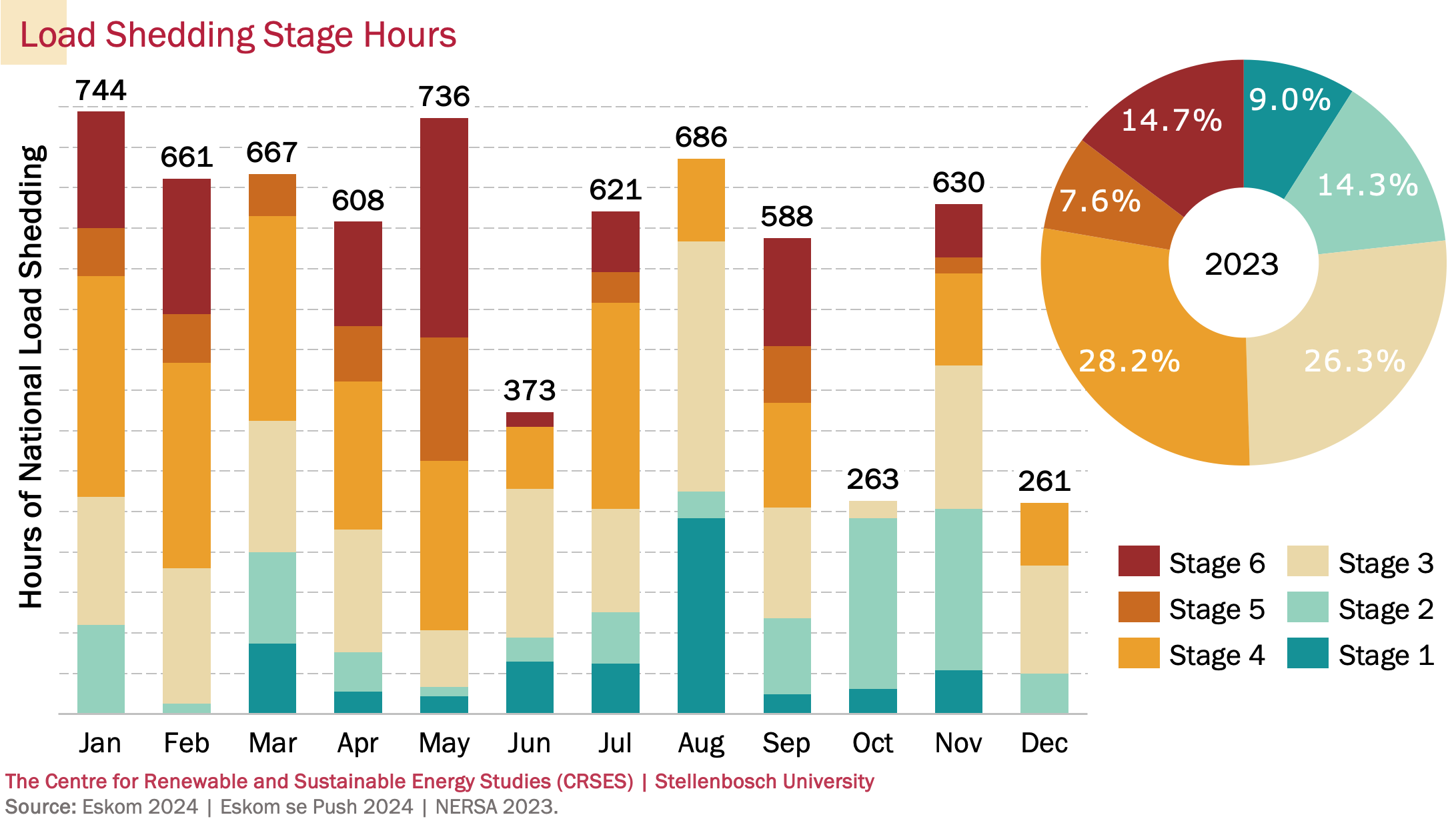
Load shedding stages by hour in 2023

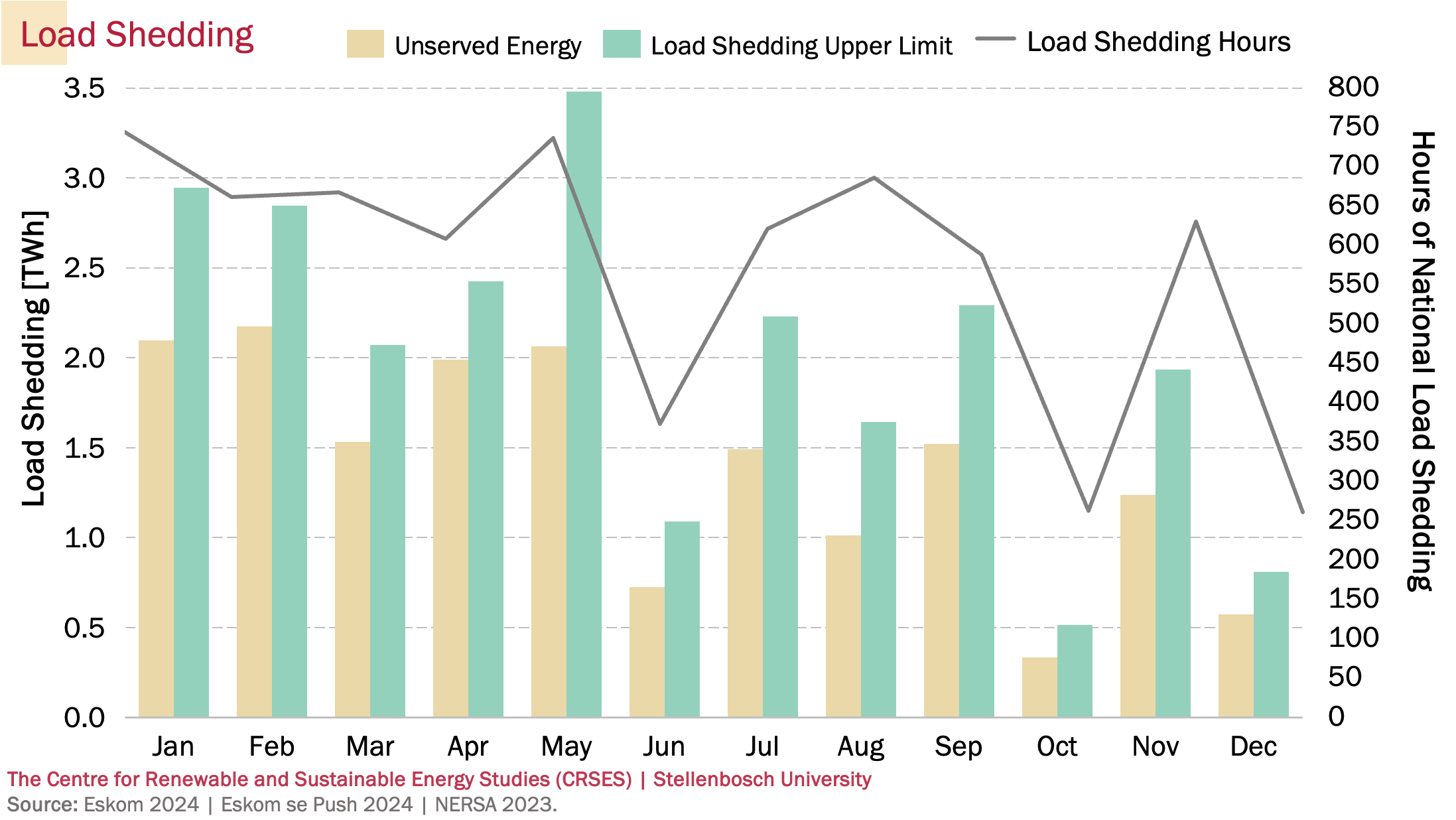
Loadshedding in 2023

On 22 February 2023, Eskom announced that its former CEO André de Ruyter, who was due to leave the company next month, had left with immediate effect amid a worsening nationwide energy crisis. The announcement came after its former CEO gave an interview with the eNCA news agency where he expressed doubts about the political will in government to end endemic graft at the power utility. In an effort to address allegations of corruption at Eskom as well as the unprecedented power shortages, President Cyril Ramaphosa appointed Kgosientsho Ramokgopa as the country's first ever electricity minister. On 12 April 2023, level 6 load shedding was implemented as generating units failed at the Tutuka, Kriel, Duvha and Kendal power stations. Parts of the cities of Pretoria and Mamelodi were left without power for multiple days after 7 pylons collapsed when thieves cut the supporting struts of a number of large pylons—reportedly for scrap—causing multiple separate collapses.

==== 2024 return to stability ====
This period of loadshedding ended at 5:00 am on 26 March 2024 starting a significant period of reliable power supply. Multiple reasons were given by government and Eskom for this change. They are:

- A change in management and leadership at Eskom.
- The implementation of a two-year Generation Operational Recovery Plan to increase power generation.
- The issuing of a R 254 billion ($14bn; £10.9bn) debt-relief package for Eskom provided by the government.
- A resulting reduction in the number of unplanned breakdowns of power generation units allowed for the successful implementation of planned maintenance.
- A reduction in demand for electricity provided by Eskom due to higher energy bills, the spread of alternative energy sources, and slow economic growth.
- The creation of a Ministry of Electricity and Energy.

Additional reasons reported for the end of loadshedding included:

- A return to Original Equipment Manufacturers to perform maintenance thereby reducing costs and enhancing maintenance quality.
- Performance incentives to staff contributing directly to improved structural performance of the system.

By July 2024 this had resulted in an increase in energy generating capacity to 35,000 MW, the highest in 6 years. Although some of the coal power plants have reported improved performance (Kusile, Hendrina, Grootvlei, Matla, Kendal, Majuba, Tutuka, Kriel and Matimba) others have reported reducing performance (Arnot, Lethabo, Camden, Medupi and Duvha) indicating continuing challenges.

=== 2025 ===
On 22 February 2025, South Africa experienced once again severe power cuts due to multiple failures at the Majuba and Camden power stations. Eskom, the state-owned power utility, initially implemented Stage 6 load shedding without any prior warning, Eskom anticipated that that stage of load shedding would continue until the end of the week.

== Impact ==
The energy crisis has had a number of very negative impacts on South Africa. These range from reducing economic growth and making it more difficult to do business in the country to increasing crime rates and shaping South African politics. A 2022 study by the University of Johannesburg indicated that since level 6 load shedding was introduced the repeated periods of load shedding has significantly reduced "the overall happiness of South Africans." In 2023 a case was brought before the Pretoria High Court to declare the energy crisis unconstitutional due to the hardship it imposed.

=== Health care ===
As of April 2023, 80% of public health-care facilities were affected by and only 20% exempt from power cuts. Patient care has been compromised especially in rural areas, but also in major hospitals who "were overwhelmed with patients coming from rural hospitals". Surgical care has been most affected with long waiting lists. Health standards were dropping together with water shortages in all public health facilities. The Health and Allied Workers Indaba Trade Union said "nurses were fed up with relying on mobile phone torchlights, unreliable generators, and using cooler boxes to keep vaccines and other medicines at the correct temperatures".

=== Crime ===
In 2022, it was reported that long periods of loadshedding were resulting in many increased incidents of crime. This included metal thieves using periods of when there is no power to steal equipment from power stations, sub-stations, and transmission lines thereby complicating Eskom's efforts to mitigate the energy crisis and costing the utility over R16.8 billion (US$937 million) whilst also causing additional difficulties for municipalities. Incidents of metal theft, house breaking and robberies due to a lack of security lighting and alarms had increased in some urban areas of South Africa during the period when level 6 loadshedding was implemented.

=== Protests ===
In mid-January 2023, protests over the frequency and extent of load shedding broke out in the Durban community of Phoenix and the Johannesburg community of Boksburg.

=== Economic effects ===
View source data.
South African cents per kWh of electricity, 1994 to 2020, with the start of the South African energy crisis in 2007 marked on the chart. The start of the energy crisis was also the start of a long period of increases in the price of electricity in South Africa.

According to Lungile Mashele, an energy specialist at the Development Bank of Southern Africa, the ongoing power crisis has had significant economic consequences:

- Power outages have reduced the potential size of the South African economy by approximately 20% since the inception of load shedding in 2007.
- The costs associated with load shedding have led to an annual GDP reduction of 1 to 1.3% since 2007, with daily economic losses estimated between $85 million and $230 million for the country.
- Average electricity tariffs increased by 460% between 2007 and 2020, adding further burden on businesses and households.

The energy crisis has significantly limited economic growth in South Africa thereby preventing the country from resolving high rates of unemployment. The power shortage is estimated to have reduced economic growth in 2021 by 3% thereby costing the country an estimated 350,000 potential new jobs for that year alone. In 2022 the insurance company Sanlam reported that the cost of replacing appliances due to power surges following loadshedding periods had exceeded the cost of replacing appliances due to burglaries.

In 2022 the business analysis firm Intellidex estimated that it would cost South Africa R500 billion (US$28 billion) to resolve the energy crisis within three years. Alexforbes has estimated that prolonged stage 6 load shedding would cost the country R4 billion (US$216 million) a day in lost potential economic activity and that the costs of load shedding increase exponentially with each increase in level.

==== Business ====
As of 2008 big companies with international investors were also affected by the electricity crisis and announced these effects to the international community, bringing the situation to the attention of potential foreign investors. Load shedding in the first six months of 2015 was estimated to have cost South African businesses R13.72 billion in lost revenue with an additional R716 million spent by businesses on backup generators.

Banks and telecommunications companies have generally continued to operate as usual thanks to existing backup systems. However, as of November 2021 load shedding led to diminished mobile network coverage, as backup batteries have also been stolen and cellphone stations vandalised during power outages.

In 2019, small business owners said that load shedding was the number one challenge that they faced. In a small business sentiment report of 3984 small business owners 44% said that they had been severely affected by load shedding with 85% stating that it had reduced their revenue. As a result, 40% of small businesses lost revenue of 20% or more during the load shedding period while 20% of owners claimed that if load shedding were to continue at similar levels to Q1 of 2019, they would have to consider reducing their staffing levels or closing their business.

In February 2023, a chicken farmer sued Eskom for damages when loadshedding resulted in 40,000 of his broiler chickens suffocating.

==== Mining ====
In January and February 2008 global platinum and palladium prices hit record highs as mines were first shut down and subsequently restricted in their electricity use. South Africa supplies 85% of the world's platinum and 30% of palladium. Mining companies estimate that hundreds of thousands of ounces of both gold and platinum production will be lost every year until the crisis passes. Due primarily to the impact on mining companies, economists in 2011 downgraded GDP growth forecasts significantly. The consensus hovered around 4% (well short of the 6% government target), with the caveat that growth could reduce by 20 basis points every month under certain circumstances.

== Crisis management ==
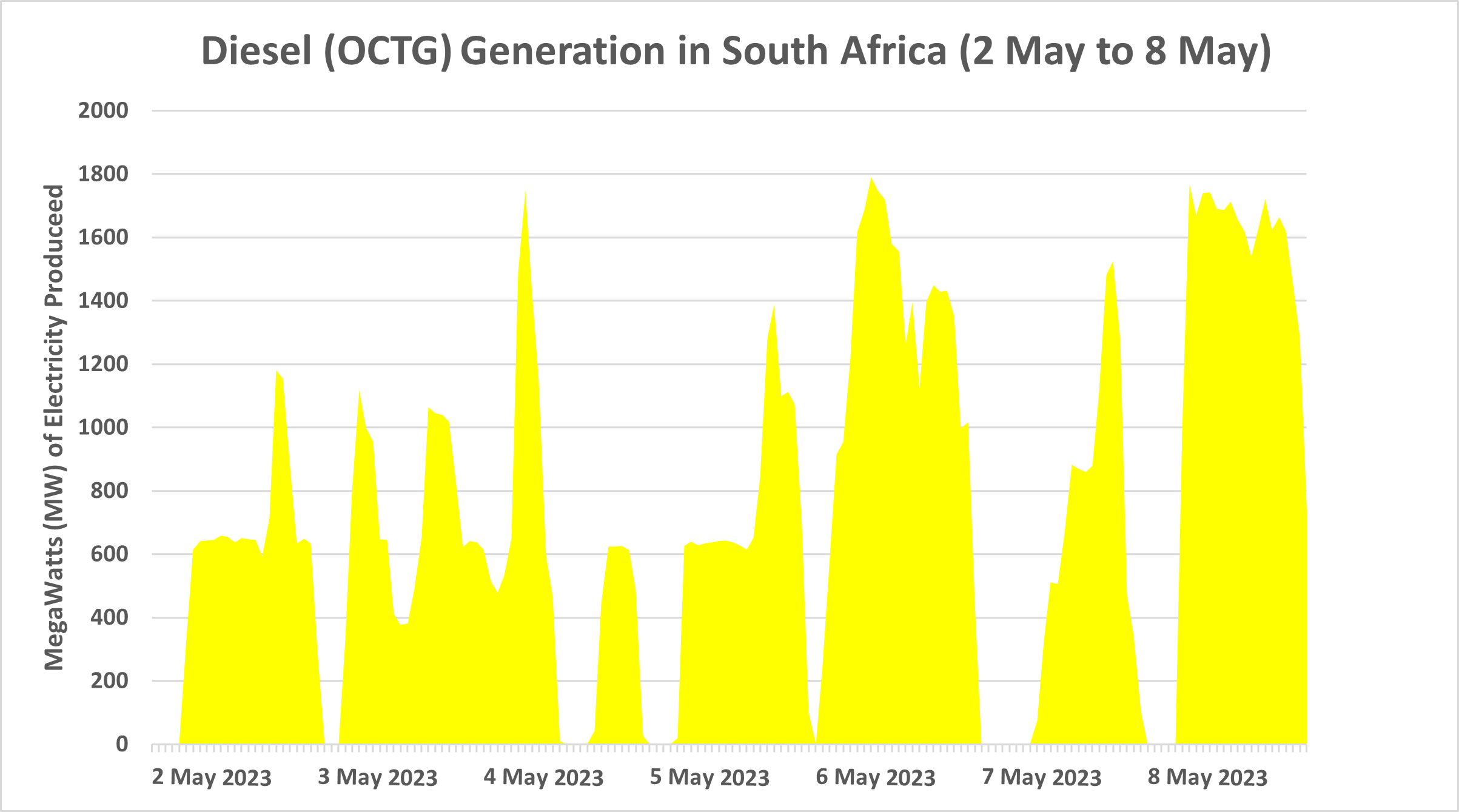
Eskom Diesel Energy Production in 2023

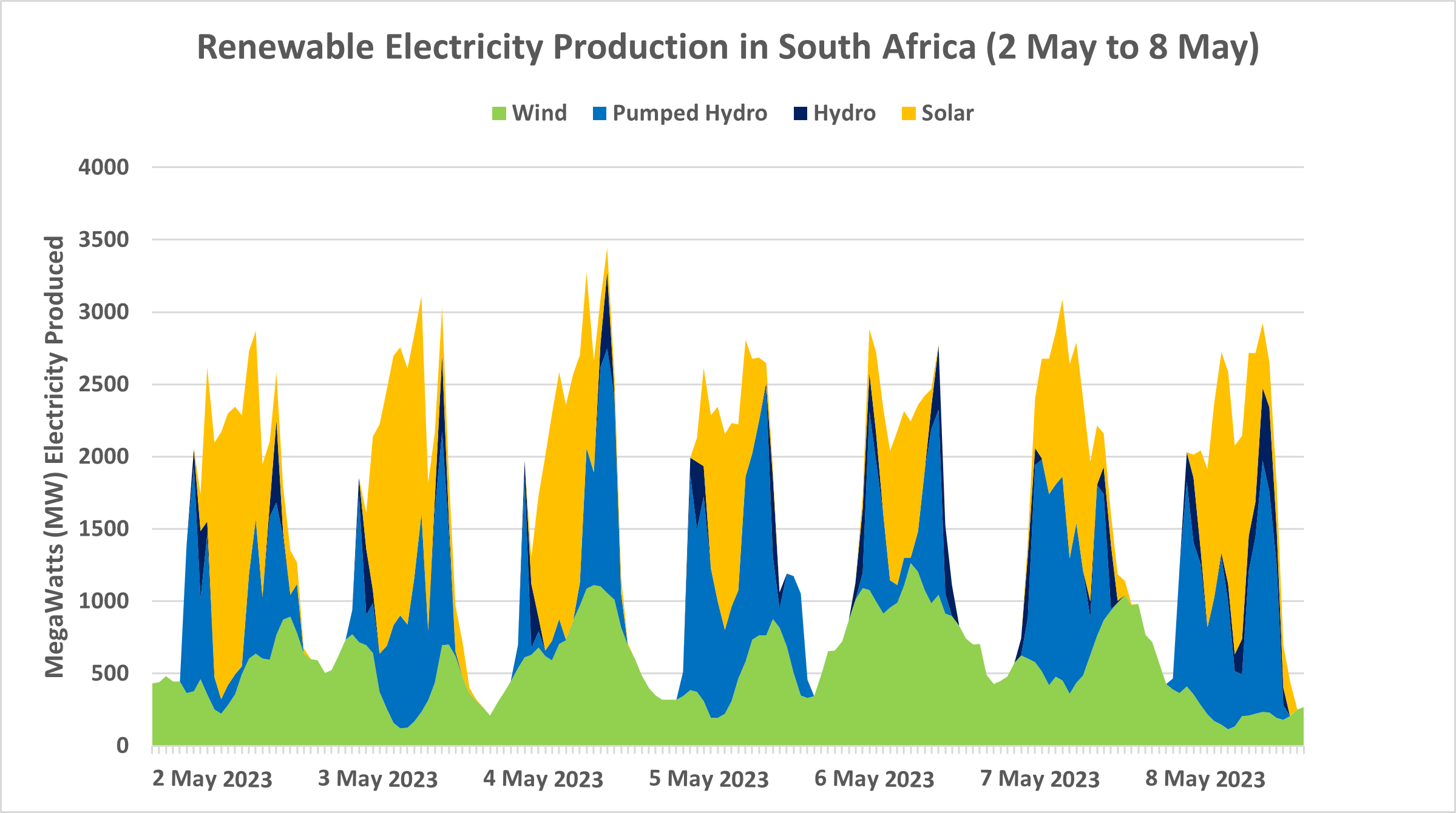
Eskom Renewable Energy Production in 2023

As of February 2008, blackouts were temporarily halted due to reduced demand and maintenance stabilization. This drop in demand was caused by many of the country's mines shutting down or slowing to help alleviate the burden. However, regularly scheduled mandatory load shedding started in April 2008, to allow maintenance periods of power generators, and recovery of coal stockpiles before the winter, when electricity usage is expected to surge.

Expanding generating capacity will see an estimated spend of R280 billion over the next five years from 2015 onwards, with around 20 000 megawatts of additional capacity due to be online by 2025. However, neither short nor long term funding has yet been secured and the downgrading of Eskom's credit rating has ignited speculation of a capital injection by the government.

On 11 December 2014, it was announced that President Jacob Zuma had assigned Deputy President Cyril Ramaphosa to oversee the turnaround of three state-owned companies namely "Eskom, South African Airways, and the South African Post Office", all in dire straits.

On 15 January 2015 Eskom's then-CEO Tshediso Matona admitted that Eskom's policy to "Keep the Lights on" meant that power station maintenance was neglected for years and that South Africans would have to get used to electricity blackouts for the next four to five years. In December that year an agreement between Eskom and Areva to replace steam generators at the Koeberg nuclear plant was judged "unlawful", by the Supreme Court of Appeal, bringing the utility company's tender process into question.

In late 2016, Standard & Poor's Global Ratings downgraded Eskom's credit rating further into sub-investment cutting its long-term credit rating to BB–two levels below the investment threshold. In the same year Matshela Koko, former head of generation for Eskom, was named as acting CEO. Eskom stated it intended to pursue a nuclear solution to current energy woes. According to projections from late 2016, nuclear power would provide over 1000GW of power by 2050. In preparation, the company launched a training program for 100 technicians, engineers, and artisans to certify them as nuclear operators. In January 2018 Eskom's acting Chief Financial Officer stated that the company could not afford a new build, following a 34% drop in interim profits due to declining sales and increasing financing costs. The government stated it would proceed with the plan but more slowly.

In 2018, the National Energy Regulator of South Africa denied an application by Eskom to increase electricity tariffs by a future 19.9% for the financial year 2018/19. The regulator instead granted a 5.2% increase and gave a list of reasons for the refusal to grant higher tariffs that the South African newspaper Business Day stated painted "a picture of inefficiency, inaccurate forecasting, and cost overruns" at the power utility. Part of the refusal was the finding that Eskom had an additional 6,000 employees that were not needed, costing the company R3.8 billion annually. On 28 March 2018 Moody's Investors Service downgraded Eskom's credit rating to B2 from B1 stating that it was concerned with "the lack of any tangible financial support for the company in the February state budget".

On 24 November 2020, Moody's further downgraded Eskom's long-term credit rating to Caa1. This places Eskom's credit within the "speculative grade" of investment, with a "very high credit risk".

In 2015, the City of Cape Town sued the national government, demanding to be allowed to purchase electricity from third parties. The national government supported mandatory centralization in the Eskom system. Though Cape Town lost its case, in October 2020 the government changed its regulations to allow municipalities to build generation facilities or purchase electricity, subject to the final approval of the Ministry of Mineral Resources and Energy. The city then set a goal of 40% non-Eskom energy by 2030 and 100% clean energy by 2050.

Cape Town has adopted a range of local policies to even out local electricity demand daily as of 2022. This includes using the Steenbras Dam pumped water scheme to reduce the impact by up to two loadshedding levels. In April 2023, Cape Town announced plans to make it "loadshedding free" within 3 years starting with the construction of a 60MW solar plant.

== See also ==
- Energy crisis
- Eskom
- Load shedding
- Corruption in South Africa
- 2023 South African National Shutdown

== External Videos ==
(DSTV)

== Further reading/sources ==
- de Ruyter, André (14 May 2023). Truth to Power, My Three Years Inside Eskom, Publisher: Penguin Random House South Africa, ISBN 9781776390625
- Cowan, Kyle (1 June 2022). Sabotage: The Onslaught Against Eskom, Publisher: Penguin Random House South Africa, ISBN 1776390601.
- Dubresson, Alain & Jaglin, Sylvy (16 August 2016). Eskom: Electricity and technopolitics in South Africa, Publisher: Juta and Company (Pty) Ltd, ISBN 978-1-77582215-8
- Styan, James-Brent (2015). Blackout: The Eskom Crisis, Publisher: Jonathan Ball, ISBN 1868426963
- Harding, Andrew (1 June 2023). South Africa: On the edge of darkness, BBC News, hosted on YouTube, documentary about corruption and the energy crisis.
