= List of thermal power stations =

A thermal power station is a power station in which heat energy is converted to electric power. A thermal power station may be referred to as any of the following types:

- List of biomass power stations
- List of coal power stations
- List of fuel oil power stations
- List of geothermal power stations
- List of natural gas power stations
- List of nuclear power stations
- List of solar thermal power stations

== See also ==
- List of thermal power station failures
