= Grootvlei =

- Thaba-Kgwali
- Location within Mpumalanga Location within South Africa
- Coordinates: 26.791°S 28.515°E
- Country: South Africa
- Province: Mpumalanga
- District: Gert Sibande
- Municipality: Dipaleseng

Area
  - Total: 10.31 km^{2} (3.98 sq mi)

Population (2011)
  - Total: 5,415
  - Density: 525.2/km^{2} (1,360/sq mi)

Racial makeup (2011)
  - Black African: 76.9%
  - Coloured: 1.0%
  - Indian/Asian: 0.7%
  - White: 21.2%
  - Other: 0.2%

First languages (2011)
  - Sotho: 41.5%
  - Zulu: 24.0%
  - Afrikaans: 20.9%
  - Xhosa: 4.2%
  - Other: 9.5%
- Time zone: UTC+2 (SAST)
- Postal code (street): 2420
- PO box: n/a

Grootvlei, officially Thaba-Kgwali, is a town in Dipaleseng Local Municipality in the Mpumalanga province of South Africa. An old mining town, Grootvlei is located near the N3 road and on the R51 road, 5 km from Grootvlei Power Station.

== Description ==
The community had a booming economy in the 1970s and 1980s, when demand for coal from the power station created many jobs in the mining sector, but when the power plant was mothballed in the late 1980s due to overproduction of electricity, the local economy collapsed and Grootvlei became a virtual ghost town. The power plant was recommissioned in 2008, leading to a new period of growth.
