= National Key Points Act, 1980 =

South African law protecting sites of strategic importance

Parliament of South Africa
- Long title: Act to provide for National Key Points and the safeguarding thereof and for matters connected therewith.
- Citation: Act No. 102 of 1980
- Enacted by: Parliament of South Africa
- Assented to: 1 July 1980
- Commenced: 25 July 1980

Amended by
- National Key Points Amendment Act 44 of 1984; National Key Points Amendment Act 47 of 1985
- Status: In force

The National Key Points Act, 1980 (Act No. 102 of 1980) is an act of the Parliament of South Africa that provides for the declaration and protection of sites of national strategic importance against sabotage, as determined by the Minister of Police (previously known as the Minister for Safety and Security) since 2004 and the Minister of Defence before that. The act was designed during apartheid to secretly arrange protection primarily for privately owned strategic sites. It enables the government to compel private owners, as well as state-owned corporations, to safeguard such sites owned by them at their own cost. The act, still in force and unamended since apartheid, came under the spotlight after President Jacob Zuma's Nkandla homestead was declared a National Key Point in 2010 amid controversy over public expenditure on upgrades to the property. As of 2013, the act is officially under review.

== Apartheid legislation ==
In an apartheid-era debate on disinvestment from South Africa in 1990, chief representative of the African National Congress (ANC) to the United States Lindiwe Mabuza said the act contributed to institutionalised oppression of black South Africans. The ANC, which has been the country's ruling party since 1994, made a submission to a special Truth and Reconciliation Commission hearing on the role of business during apartheid in 1997 in which it characterises the act as "the privatisation of repression" and states: "The National Key Points Act of 1980 created another network of collaboration between the apartheid security forces and the private sector." The act contributed to significant growth in the private security industry and "the integration of state and private sector security companies with a uniform security strategy".

In February 2013 Mosiuoa Lekota, COPE leader, former ANC member and former Minister of Defence, described the act still in force unamended under an ANC government as "dastardly apartheid legislation". In November 2013 Lekota said in a Parliamentary debate about the act: "I am reminded about George Orwell's Animal Farm published in 1945. At the end, the past perpetrators of oppression and the revolutionaries who come to power are indistinguishable. Yet, how quickly, brazenly and unapologetically the ruling party uses an act it would have despised and rejected before, and rightly so, to shield its embarrassment and do damage control. Using a past law that does not even have a veneer of transparency, accountability or constitutionality devalues our constitution. The strategic abuse of the National Key Points Act is visibly and nakedly an abuse of office. It is regressive and objectionable. Only those who are morally bankrupt will use the old act as it is."

== Administration of the act ==
As of 2013, the administration of the act falls under the Government Security Regulator subprogramme of the Protection and Security Services programme of the South African Police Service (SAPS). The role of the Government Security Regulator is described in various official sources as follows:

- The SAPS Annual Report 2010/2011 states: "The Government Security Regulator provides for security regulations, evaluations and the administration of National Key Points and strategic installations."
- The SAPS Annual Report 2011/2012 and the SAPS Annual Report 2012/2013 states: "The Government Security Regulator relates to National Key Points evaluated in compliance with the National Key Points Act. Strategic installations were audited in terms of the Minimum Physical Security Standard guidelines at national and provincial government departments."
- According to the South African Defence Review 2013, the safeguarding of critical infrastructure assigned to SAPS "entails the administration, protection oversight and at times the physical protection of national key points" and the Department of Defence plays a supportive role.

The Government Sector Security Council (GSSC) was launched by SAPS in 2006 to primarily coordinate, monitor and regulate security of certain National Key Points that are not privately owned.

National Key Points include diverse critical infrastructure sites such as airports, power stations, banks and sites in the munitions and petrochemical industries including oil refineries. The majority are not state-owned. The list of sites declared as National Key Points was formerly not available to the public, but it was released in January 2015 pursuant to an order of the Johannesburg High Court. It was revealed that the list contained 204 entries; there are a further 248 state-owned strategic installations which do not fall under the act.

An advisory committee appointed by then Minister of Police Nathi Mthethwa in May 2013 clarified that:

- Military facilities fall under the Defence Act, 2002 and prison facilities fall under the Correctional Service Act, 1998 and are therefore not required to be declared National Key Points.
- Designated areas and sites have been declared and in some cases the declaration does not cover the entire site, for example the declaration in respect of airports only applies to designated areas and not the entire airport.
- There are no restrictions under the act that prevent people from gathering next to National Key Points.

== Secrecy ==
The government formerly asserted that it was not obliged to publicly disclose the details of sites that have been declared National Key Points. The Department of Police refused the requests of the Right2Know Campaign in 2012, and the Democratic Alliance Parliamentary Opposition in 2013, to disclose a list of National Key Points citing security concerns. This refusal was appealed to the Johannesburg High Court, which ordered the government to release the list. On 22 January 2015 the government abandoned its attempt to appeal the ruling, and the list was made public.

The act furthermore restricts the disclosure of information regarding security measures implemented at National Key Points and any incident that occurred at a National Key Point, defined as "any occurrence arising out of or relating to terroristic activities, sabotage, espionage or subversion". Such disclosure could constitute a criminal offence subject to penalties, but the public and journalists were unable to comply with the act as they did not know which sites have been declared National Key Points.

Critics including academics, environmentalists, the media, the Right2Know Campaign, the Institute for Security Studies and opposition parties in Parliament have expressed their concerns about the lack of transparency about National Key Points and the implications thereof, in particular:

- the use of the act to avoid government accountability on matters of public interest such as corruption and environmental hazards,
- the use of the act to protect corporate interests,
- the use of the act to restrict freedom of expression entrenched in the Bill of Rights, and
- the lack of clarity on offences and penalties that may be imposed in terms of the act on the uninformed public and journalists.

== Legislative review ==
The act has been amended twice, during apartheid in 1984 and 1985, expanding the ministerial powers granted by the act.

A new piece of legislation, the National Key Points Act and Strategic Installations Bill, was drafted in 2007 to replace the act when Charles Nqakula was Minister for Safety and Security (later known as Minister of Police). The bill was opposed by labour and civic organisations as it represented few changes in the original legislation and was considered equally draconian and was not finalised. The draft bill made provision for privately owned National Key Points, publicly owned Strategic Installations and a temporary designation of Places of Importance for privately or publicly owned sites.

In 2012 constitutional law expert Pierre de Vos stated that the act is outdated, referring to the Official Secrets Act of 1956 repealed in 1982, and contravenes the country's post-apartheid constitution. In February 2013 Deputy Minister of Public Works Jeremy Cronin publicly criticised the act, saying "This Parliament does need to look at this anachronistic and problematic piece of legislation, it may well be unconstitutional."

On 30 May 2013, then Minister of Police Nathi Mthethwa announced plans to table a redrafted bill in Parliament early in 2014. In November 2013 then Leader of the Opposition Lindiwe Mazibuko tabled a private member's bill, the Protection of Critical Infrastructure Bill, in Parliament with a more transparent system subject to Parliamentary oversight and without the existing wide discretionary ministerial powers open to abuse. Mthethwa subsequently presented the findings and recommendations of an advisory committee he appointed in May 2013 to Parliament, stating "The National Key Points Act has been criticized in the recent past for being based on old apartheid legislation. It also became clear to us that this Act needed to be revised for various reasons, key amongst these is the need to align it with the Constitution and other more recent legislations. In addition there has been criticism that the actual use of the Act to address infrastructure security is inappropriate." In March 2014, Mthethwa announced that the legislative review would be held over to the country's next administration following the 2014 general election in May. Following the election, Mthethwa was replaced as Minister of Police by Nkosinathi Nhleko, who was appointed to President Jacob Zuma's cabinet in his second term of office. In a submission to Parliament on 14 August 2014 regarding his Nkandla homestead, Zuma said Nhleko must expedite the legislative review.

== Nkandla homestead ==
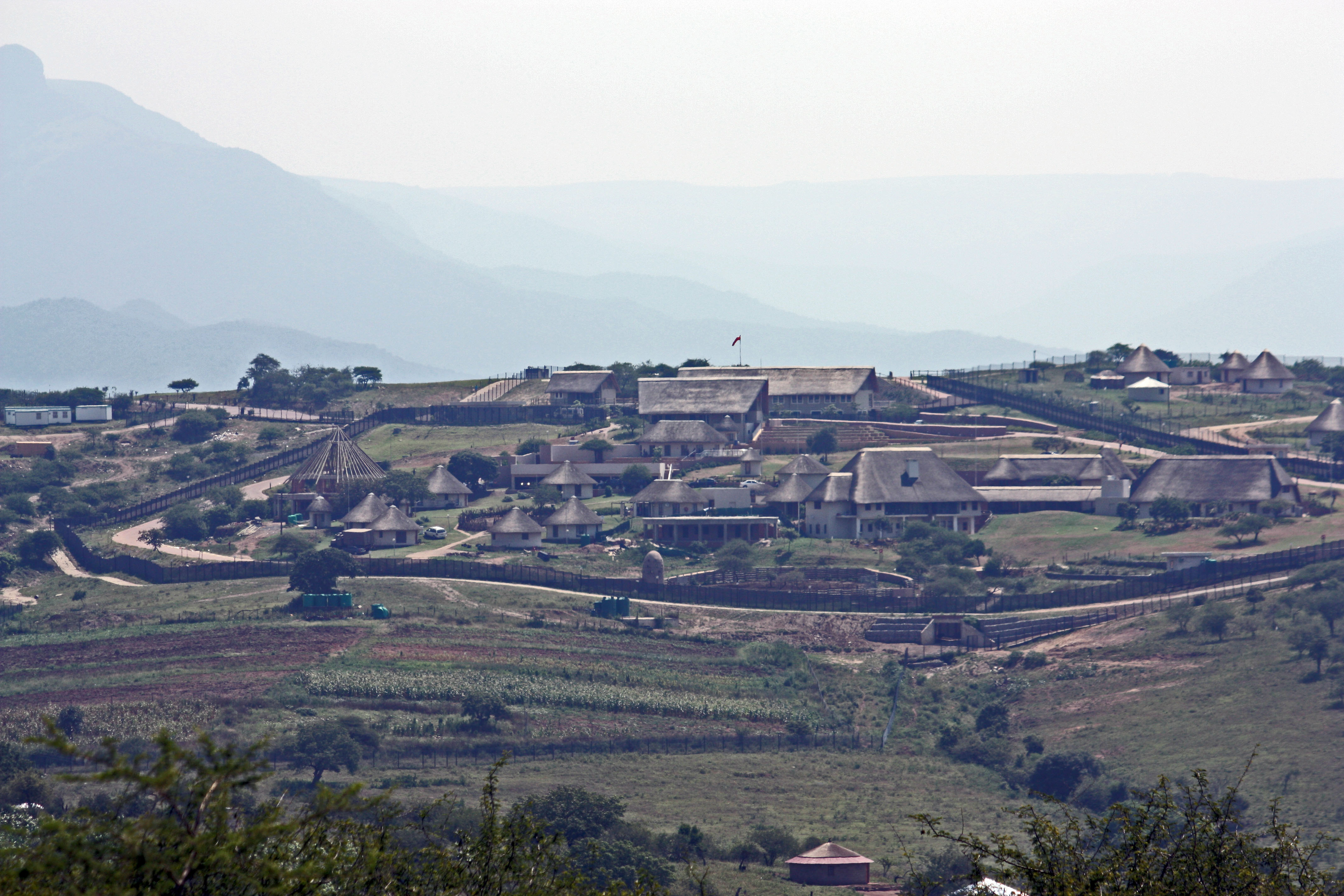
President Jacob Zuma's Nkandla homestead was declared a National Key Point in 2010.

The act came under the spotlight during revelations about public expenditure on President Jacob Zuma's private residence at Nkandla, first exposed by Mail & Guardian journalist Mandy Rossouw in December 2009. The site was declared a National Key Point by then Minister of Police Nathi Mthethwa in April 2010, and the act was invoked by government officials in an attempt to justify the expenditure, withhold information about it, and prevent anyone from taking or publishing photographs of the homestead.

In addition to public expenditure on upgrades not related to security, Zuma did not safeguard his residence at his own cost in contravention of Mthethwa's declaration in terms of the act.

In her final report on security upgrades to Zuma's Nkandla homestead published on 19 March 2014, Public Protector Thuli Madonsela found that Zuma had unduly benefited from the R246 million the state had spent on the upgrades, criticised Mthethwa and other government officials for maladministration and instructed Mthethwa to urgently institute a review of the act. Mthethwa's term of office as Minister of Police ended in May 2014.

Following criticism in the media of the photo ban, the government released a clarifying statement that "Government has no problem with the media publishing pictures of National Key Points, including President Jacob Zuma's Nkandla residence, as it is part of their daily line of duty. However, zooming into safety and security features of National Key Points is a challenge as it compromises national security."

== See also ==
- Protection of State Information Bill (Secrecy Bill)
- List of National Key Points
