= Arnot coal mine =

Coal mine in Mpumalanga, South Africa

Arnot Coal Mine
- Location within Mpumalanga Location within South Africa

Location
- Location: Mpumalanga, South Africa; 25.93°S 29.7742°E

Production
- Products: Coking coal

The Arnot Coal Mine is a coal mine located in the Mpumalanga Province. The mine has coal reserves amounting to 192 million tonnes of coking coal, one of the largest coal reserves in Africa and the world. The mine produces around 5 million tonnes of coal per year.

Output from the mine directly feeds the Arnot Power Station.
