= Transnet Pipelines =

South African state-owned fuel pipeline company

Transnet Pipelines (TPL)
- Formerly: Petronet
- Type: State-owned entity
- Industry: Pipeline freight services
- Founded: 1965; 61 years ago
- Headquarters: Durban, KwaZulu-Natal, South Africa
- Area served: South Africa
- Key people: Sibongiseni Khathi, Chief Executive; Tanuja Naidoo CFO
- Services: Pipeline operations Petroleum storage
- Revenue: R8.146 billion 2025
- Number of employees: 710
- Website: www.transnet.net/TransnetPipelines

Transnet Pipelines (TPL) (formerly Petronet) is the principal operator of South Africa's fuel pipeline system. A subsidiary of state-owned company Transnet, TPL is responsible managing and maintaining a network of over 3,114 kilometres (1,900 miles) of pipelines, as well as for related petroleum storage.

Transnet Pipelines works with petrols, diesel fuel, jet fuel, crude oil, and natural gas. Total network throughput is over 13.4 billion litres (2.9 billion imperial gallons; 3.5 billion US gallons) in 2025.

== History ==
The introduction of pipelines to convey petroleum in South Africa occurred in 1963 with a Bill enacted in parliament granting the right to manage them to the South African Railways and Harbours Administration (SAR&H). The Bill called for pipelines to be built 1.5 metres underground where possible.

South Africa in the 1960s was undergoing an economic boom which resulted in a requirement to increase petroleum products by twelve percent to meet demand. Prior to this point, rail transport via Maputo (Lourenço Marques) and Durban was the main means of transport and was reaching a point of full capacity. Industry and SAR&H saw pipelines as a means of relieving the pressure on the railways.

The first pipeline built was 12 inches wide at 430 cubic metres per hour, costing R20 million and was routed from Durban to Pretoria via Pietermaritzburg, Ladysmith, Bethlehem, Kroonstad, Sasolburg and Alberton with ability to draw product from each of those points. It was commissioned in October 1965 and the first consignment delivered on 25 November 1965.

The first pipeline would later be extended to deliver petroleum products to Klerksdorp, Potchefstroom, and Langlaagte; mining towns near the city of Johannesburg. Though the first pipeline was not entirely successful, the SAR&H decided to build a larger pipeline and also meet the strategy of the government, to stockpile oil in mines as means to protect against a proposed oil boycott by the international community opposed to the country's Apartheid policies.

This pipeline came into commission on 9 June 1969, with an eighteen-inch diameter, costing R50 million (1970) and routed from Durban over the Drakensberg to Sasolburg and its new Natref refinery with pipelines to Kendal and Ogies for storage of crude oil in old coal mines. There was also an extension to Empangeni and a spur to the future Port of Richards Bay as the latter was proposed to receive oil tankers sometime in the future.

After many years of modifications, these three developed into a refined fuels, crude oil and gas pipelines with an additional one transporting aviation fuel from Natref to OR Tambo International Airport from 1972. In 1979, the Sasol II project was also linked to the Witwatersrand.

== Operations ==
Transnet Pipelines uses a telecontrol system to monitor its pipeline. The telecontrol system is by Siemens Systems and "allows for automatic leak detection and batch tracking". The system operates with a 4-second delay between an event in the pipeline and on-screen display in Durban.

The company's projects include a new multiproduct pipeline corridor between Gauteng and Durban. It is working on a partnership with Pande Gas in Mozambique.

== See also ==
- Logistics in South Africa
- 2021 Transnet Cyberattack
