= Grootvlei Power Station =

Power plant in South Africa

- Country: South Africa
- Location: Grootvlei, Mpumalanga
- Coordinates: 26°46′S 28°30′E
- Status: Operational
- Commission date: 1969
- Owner: Eskom
- Operator: Eskom

Thermal power station
- Primary fuel: Coal
- Turbine technology: Steam turbine

Power generation
- Units operational: 2
- Units planned: 6 × 200 MW
- Nameplate capacity: 1,200 Megawatt

Grootvlei Power Station is a coal-fired power station located in Grootvlei, Mpumalanga, South Africa.

== History ==
The first of Grootvlei's six units was commissioned in 1969. In 1989 three units were mothballed and in 1990 the other three followed. Due to the power crisis being experienced in South Africa, Eskom decided to return the station to service. By 2008 three of Grootvlei's units were back online, providing 585 MW to the national grid.

Grootvlei's units 5 and 6 were the first test facilities for dry cooling in South Africa. Unit 6 has an indirect dry cooling system.

On 22 July 2022, Unit 2 suffered a fire caused by a leaking fuel oil supply/return pipeline.

== Power generation ==
The station consists of six 200 megawatts (270,000 hp) units for a total installed capacity of 1,200 megawatts (1,600,000 hp). The design efficiency at the rated Turbine Maximum Continuous Rating is 32.90%.

== Crime ==
In mid-December 2022, at the request of the Minister of Public Enterprises, Pravin Gordhan, and President Cyril Ramaphosa, Minister of Defence Thandi Modise deployed a small contingent of SANDF troops at the station (besides at Camden, Majuba and Tutuka) to curb growing threats of sabotage, theft, vandalism, and corruption.

== See also ==
- Eskom
- Fossil-fuel power plant
- List of power stations in South Africa
