= Camden Power Station =

Coal power plant in Mpumalanga, South Africa

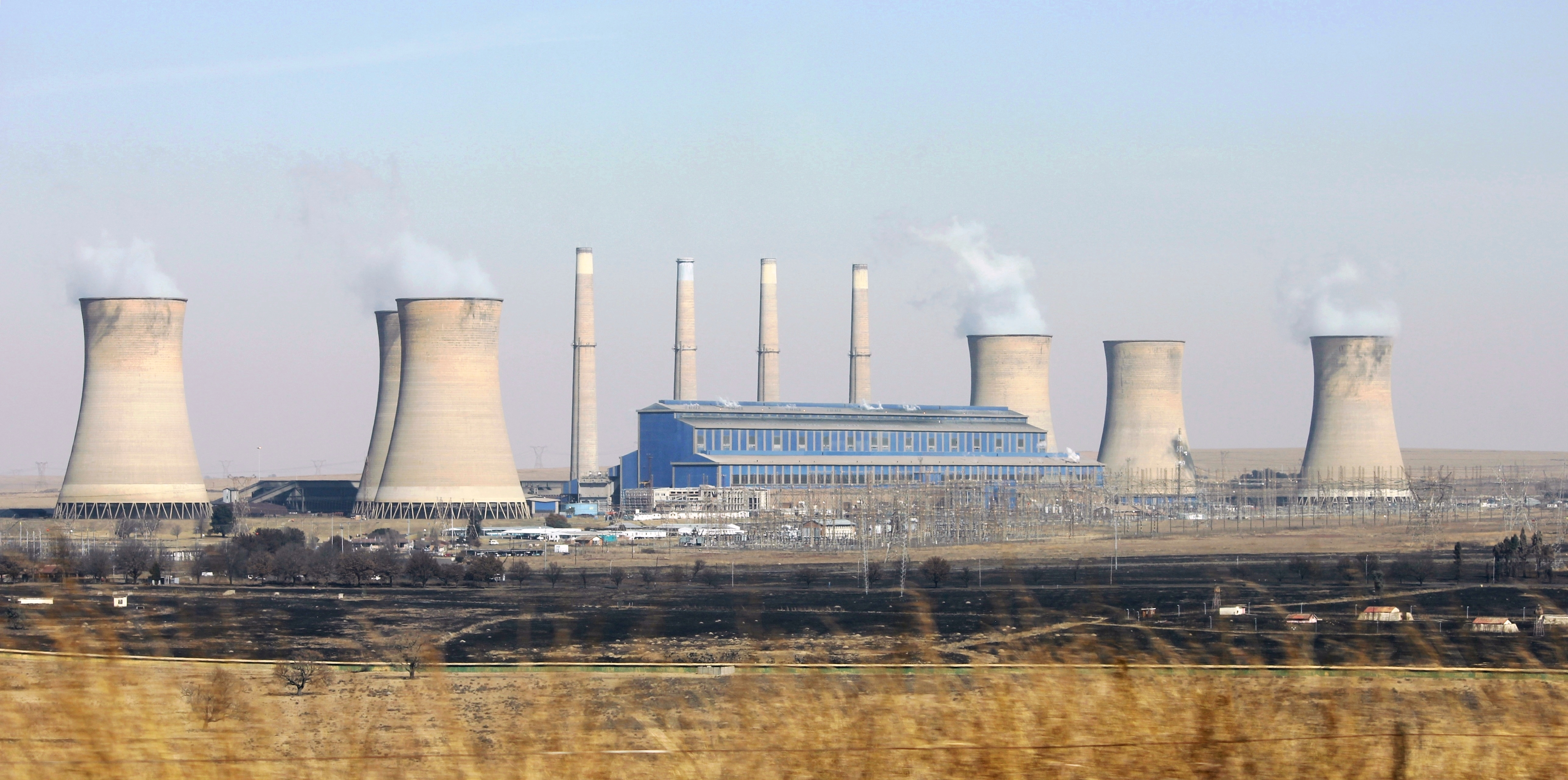
- Country: South Africa
- Location: Mpumalanga, South Africa
- Coordinates: 26°37′13″S 30°5′38″E
- Status: Operational
- Commission date: 1967
- Owner: Eskom
- Operator: Eskom

Thermal power station
- Primary fuel: Coal
- Turbine technology: Steam turbine

Power generation
- Units operational: 8; 3 x 200 MW; 1 x 196 MW; 2 x 195 MW; 1 x 190 MW; 1 x 185 MW
- Units planned: 8 × 200 MW
- Nameplate capacity: 1561 Megawatt

External links
- Commons: Related media on Commons

Camden Power Station in Mpumalanga, South Africa, is a coal-fired power plant operated by Eskom.

== History ==
Camden was commissioned in 1967. Between 1990 and 2006 the station was mothballed, but South Africa's energy crisis in the early 21st century prompted Eskom to recommission the station, starting with unit 6 in July 2005 and completing with unit 1 in July 2008.

Camden was bombed in 1981 as part of UMkhonto weSizwe's campaign against Apartheid and the South African government's nuclear weapons program.

== Power generation ==
Power is generated by eight 200 MW units with a total installed capacity on 1,600 MW. Coal energy to electrical energy conversion efficiency is 33.40%

In the Integrated results for 2015, nominal capacity is listed as 1,481 MW with gross capacity of 1,561 MW (3 x 200 MW; 1 x 196 MW; 2 x 195 MW; 1 x 190 MW; 1 x 185 MW).

The four chimneys of Camden Power Station are 152.4 metres (500 ft) tall.

== Power distribution ==
In addition to feeding the South African grid, Camden, along with Arnot Power Station, also feeds the Mozal Aluminium smelter in Mozambique via 400 kV transmission lines. Mozal consumes around 950 MW.

== Crime ==
In November 2022, Eskom reported multiple arrests at Camden Power Station, which were linked to sabotage, coal theft and coal fraud. A contractor, intending to land additional maintenance and repair jobs, intentionally drained oil from an oil burner bearing which caused the burners to trip repeatedly. Truck drivers were also arrested for their possession of substandard (coal mixed with worthless material) or stolen coal which was to be delivered to Eskom.

Mid-December 2022, at the request of the Minister of Public Enterprises, Pravin Gordhan, and President Cyril Ramaphosa, Minister of Defence Thandi Modise deployed a small contingent of SANDF troops at the station (besides Majuba, Grootvlei and Tutuka) due to a growing threat of sabotage, theft, vandalism and corruption.

== See also ==
- Eskom
- Fossil-fuel power plant
- List of power stations in South Africa
