= Arnot Power Station =

Power station in Mpumalanga, South Africa

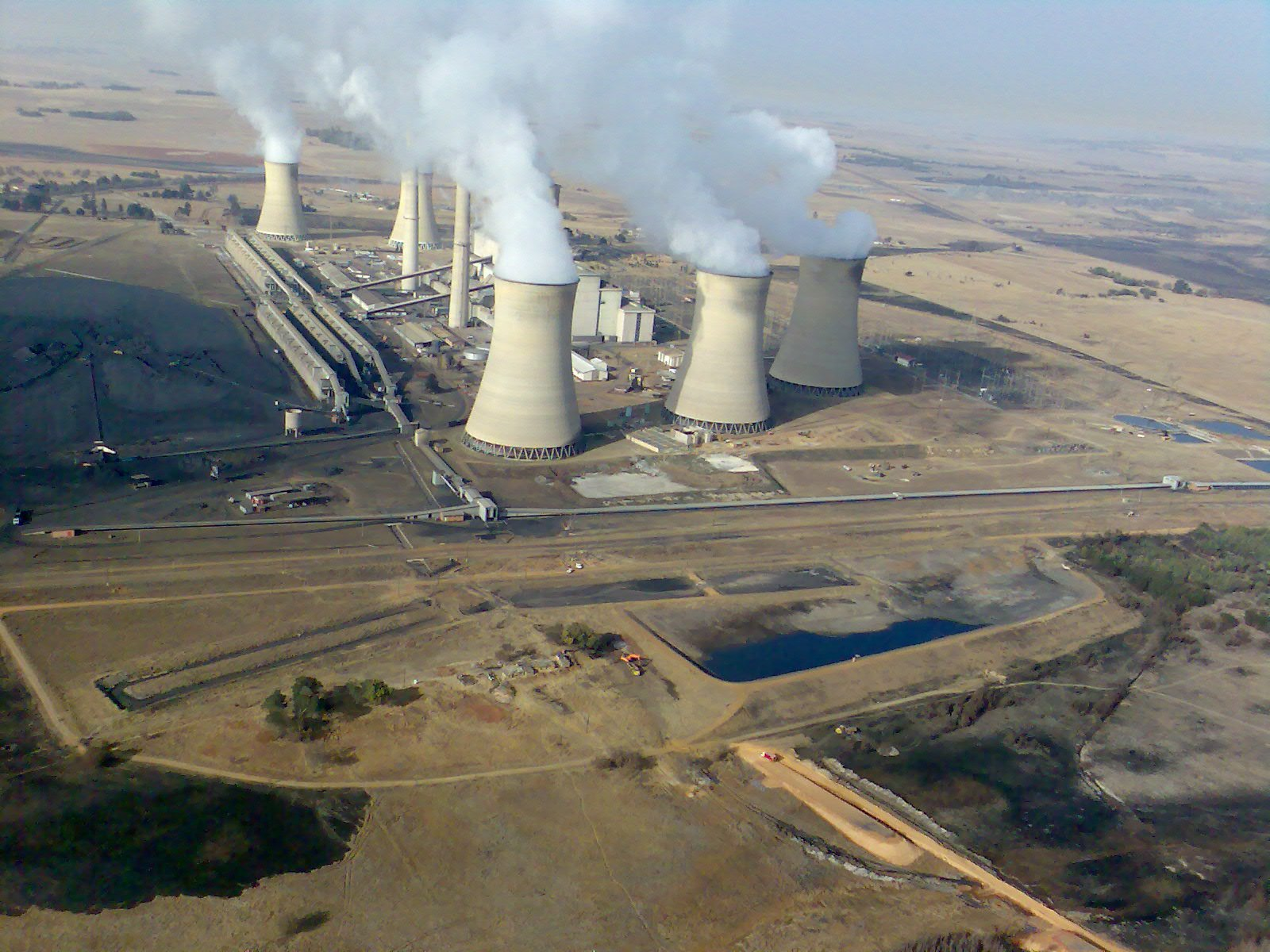
- Country: South Africa
- Location: Mpumalanga, South Africa
- Coordinates: 25.94384°S 29.78956°E
- Status: Operational
- Commission date: 1971-1975
- Owner: Eskom
- Operator: Eskom
- Employees: 800 (2017)

Thermal power station
- Primary fuel: Coal
- Turbine technology: Steam turbine

Power generation
- Units operational: 1 x 370 MW; 1 x 390 MW; 2 x 396 MW; 2 x 400 MW
- Units planned: 6 × 350 MW
- Nameplate capacity: 2,352 Megawatt

External links
- Commons: Related media on Commons

Arnot Power Station in Mpumalanga, South Africa, is a coal-fired power plant operated by Eskom. Coal from the Arnot coal mine directly feeds the station.

== History ==
Construction of Arnot started in 1968, this generation unit went on line in 1971 and the station was fully operational by 1975. Between 1992 and 1997 three of its units were mothballed due to Eskom's surplus generating capacity, but they were brought back online in January 1997, November 1997 and December 1998 respectively.

The cooling towers were constructed using a unique convex slip-form process by the contractor Concor.

Arnot was bombed in 1981 as part of UMkhonto weSizwe's campaign against Apartheid and the South African government's nuclear weapons program.

== Power generation ==
Power generation was originally by six 350 MW units with a total installed capacity of 2,100 MW. Turbine Maximum Continuous Rating is 35.60%

Unit ratings now given as 1 x 370 MW; 1 x 390 MW; 2 x 396 MW; 2 x 400 MW for a total of 2,352 MW installed capacity and 2,232 MW nominal capacity.

== Power distribution ==
In addition to feeding the South African grid, Arnot, along with Camden Power Station, also feeds the Mozal Aluminium smelter in Mozambique via 400 kV transmission lines. Mozal consumes around 950 MW.

== Safety ==
Arnot has twice been awarded NOSCAR status by the National Occupational Safety Association.

== See also ==
- Fossil-fuel power plant
- List of power stations in South Africa
