= Kriel Power Station =

Power station in Mpumalanga, South Africa

- Location of Kriel Power Station in South Africa
- Country: South Africa
- Location: Mpumalanga
- Coordinates: 26°15′15″S 29°10′46″E
- Status: Operational
- Commission date: 1979
- Owner: Eskom
- Operator: Eskom

Thermal power station
- Primary fuel: Coal
- Turbine technology: Steam turbine

Power generation
- Units operational: 6
- Units planned: 6 × 500 MW
- Nameplate capacity: 3,000 Megawatt

Kriel Power Station in Mpumalanga, South Africa, is a coal-fired power plant operated by Eskom. It is located about 4 km from Matla Power Station just outside the town of Kriel (Emalahleni Local Municipality, Mpumalanga).

In contrast with most other Eskom power stations, the turbine generators at Kriel are each housed in a separate building rather than the more common single turbine hall.

When Kriel was completed in 1979 it was the largest coal-fired power station in the Southern Hemisphere. It was also one of the first stations to be supplied with coal from a fully mechanised coal mine.

== History ==
On 25 July 2022, the entire power station tripped. Eskom said the first fault caused units 1, 2 and 3 of the power station to trip, while the second fault tripped units 4 and 5. Unit 6 was already offline.

== Power generation ==
The station has six 500 MW units for a total installed capacity of 3,000 MW with turbine Maximum Continuous Rating at 36.90%.

== See also ==
- Fossil-fuel power plant
- List of power stations in South Africa
