= Majuba Power Station =

Power station in Mpumalanga, South Africa

- Location of Majuba Power Station in South Africa
- Country: South Africa
- Location: Mpumalanga
- Coordinates: 27°6′2″S 29°46′17″E
- Status: Operational
- Construction began: 1983
- Commission date: 1996
- Owner: Eskom
- Operator: Eskom

Thermal power station
- Primary fuel: Coal
- Secondary fuel: Syngas

Power generation
- Units operational: 3 X 665 MW; 3 X 716 MW
- Nameplate capacity: 4,110 MW

Majuba Power Station between Volksrust and Amersfoort in Mpumalanga, South Africa, is a coal-fired power plant operated by Eskom. Majuba is Eskom's only power station that is not linked to a specific mine and it receives its coal from various sources. This was due to an error in geotechnical engineering core drilling which did not identify that the proposed local coal mine was under solid bedrock.

== History ==
Construction started in September 1983 and by April 1996 the first unit was connected to the grid. The last unit was commissioned in April 2001.

== Power generation ==
Majuba has three 665 MW dry-cooled units and three 716 MW wet-cooled units with a total installed capacity of 4,110 MW with a turbine Maximum Continuous Rating of 35.3% on the dry-cooled turbines and 37.7% on the wet-cooled units.

== Underground coal gasification ==
In addition to coal, the Majuba Power Station is fired by syngas produced by underground coal gasification at the nearby Majuba demonstration facility on the Majuba coalfield. The 3,000–5,000 cubic metres per hour (110,000–180,000 cu ft/h) pilot plant was commissioned in January 2007 and the first electricity was generated from the underground coal gasification gas on 31 May 2007. Produced syngas is transported from the facility to the power station by 7-kilometre (4.3 mi) pipeline with a diameter of 600 millimetres (24 in). There is a plan to build a 1,200 MW commercial generation facility.

== Silo collapse ==
On 1 November 2014, the plant was running under normal load when a visible crack was reported on Silo 20 by a member of the operating staff at approximately 12:30. Personnel in the area were subsequently evacuated. At 13:20, the silo collapsed and the plant's output was immediately reduced from 3600 MW to 1800 MW. Shortly after, the output was reduced further to 600 MW.

== Coal supply ==
Majuba requires 14 million tonnes (14 Mtpa) of coal per annum which were originally supposed to come from a colliery built and operated by Rand Mines but that mine was decommissioned in 1993. An 8 Mtpa rail link branch from Palmfort was commissioned and, by 1996, was sufficient for the power plant owing to the delayed construction schedule. From 2003 Eskom implemented a policy of procuring coal from new emerging sources which resulted in delivery by road, since the location of the mines precluded their use of the Palmfort line, despite the fact that it was sufficient for Majuba's needs.

In early 2000 Majuba started increasing its coal consumption by 2.2 Mtpa to a target of 14 Mtpa by 2010, based on forecasts of electricity demand growth. To accommodate this a 68 km rail line from Ermelo to Majuba was planned which would link up to the heavy haul export rail line from Mpumalanga to Richards Bay. The project was approved by the Eskom board in December 2004 with a cost-to-completion of R1,5-billion. The project ran several years late and was expected to be completed by March 2021 at a cost-to-completion of R8-billion.

In addition, in December 2019 a coal tippler takeout conveyor caught fire at Majuba and since then all coal deliveries by rail had ceased.

== Crime ==
Mid-December 2022, at the request of the Minister of Public Enterprises, Pravin Gordhan, and President Cyril Ramaphosa, Minister of Defence Thandi Modise deployed a small contingent of SANDF troops at the station (besides at Camden, Grootvlei and Tutuka) due to a growing threat of sabotage, theft, vandalism and corruption.

== See also ==
- Fossil-fuel power plant
- List of power stations in South Africa
