= Tutuka Power Station =

Power station in Mpumalanga, South Africa

- Location of Tutuka Power Station
- Country: South Africa
- Location: Mpumalanga
- Coordinates: 26°46′43″S 29°21′7″E
- Status: Operational
- Commission date: 1985
- Owner: Eskom
- Operator: Eskom

Thermal power station
- Primary fuel: Coal

Power generation
- Units operational: 6
- Nameplate capacity: 3,654 Megawatt

Tutuka Power Station in Mpumalanga, South Africa, is a coal-fired power plant operated by Eskom. It is a twin sister to Duvha Power Station.

== History ==
The first unit at Tutuka was commissioned in June 1985 and the last went online in June 1990.

== Power generation ==
The station has six 609 MW units with a total installed capacity of 3,654 MW with turbine Maximum Continuous Rating at 38.00%. Tutuka is an important link in the 765 kV extra-high-voltage transmission system linking Mpumalanga with the Western Cape and KwaZulu-Natal.

== Crime and corruption ==
In 2020 the installation of a substandard submerged scraper chain at unit 5 of Tutuka was thwarted. These items were the cause of many breakdowns at Tutuka. The investigation that followed uncovered widespread and costly corruption which exploited lax equipment ordering and warehousing. In November 2021 two persons employed by the station and a supplier of goods and services were arrested. They were charged with theft, fraud and corruption in connection with the disappearance of spares. It was further alleged that four persons operated an oil crime syndicate which had been stealing large amounts of fuel from the station, valued at hundreds of millions of rand. Mid-December 2022, at the request of the Minister of Public Enterprises, Pravin Gordhan, and President Cyril Ramaphosa, Minister of Defence Thandi Modise deployed a small contingent of SANDF troops at the station (besides at Camden, Majuba and Grootvlei) to curb a growing threat of sabotage, theft, vandalism and corruption.

== See also ==
- Eskom
- Fossil-fuel power plant
- List of power stations in South Africa
