= Duvha Power Station =

Power station in Mpumalanga, South Africa

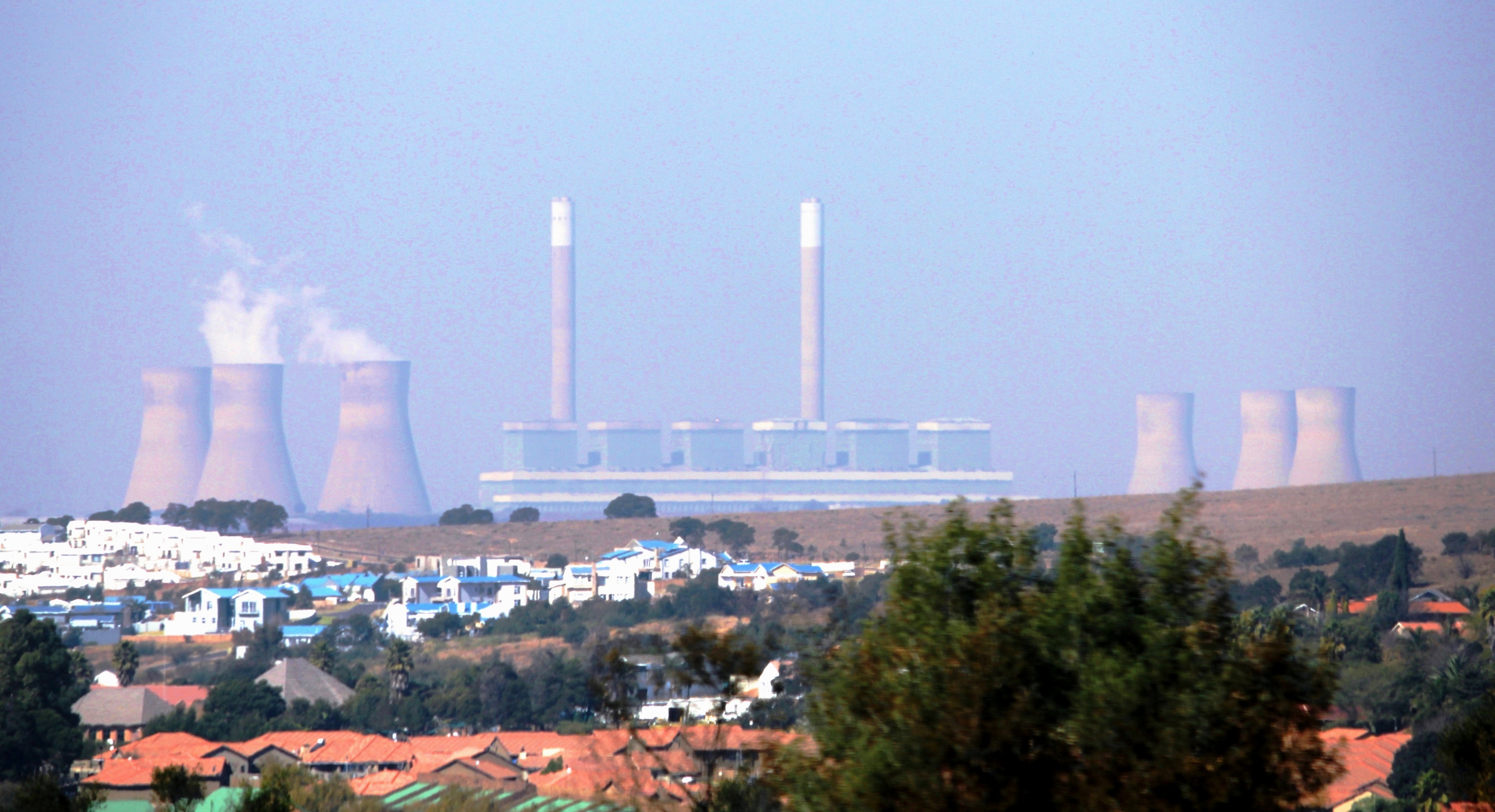
- Duvha seen from the outskirts of Witbank
- Country: South Africa
- Location: Witbank
- Coordinates: 25°57′50″S 29°20′14″E
- Status: Operational
- Commission date: 1980
- Construction cost: 1,600 million R (1984)
- Owner: Eskom
- Operator: Eskom
- Employees: 900 (2013)

Thermal power station
- Primary fuel: Coal

Power generation
- Units operational: 6
- Units planned: 6 × 600 MW
- Nameplate capacity: 3600 Megawatt

External links
- Commons: Related media on Commons

Duvha Power Station in Mpumalanga, South Africa, is a coal-fired power plant operated by Eskom. The 300 metres (980 ft) tall chimneys at Duvha are the second and third tallest structures in Africa, only a chimney located at the Secunda CTL plant is taller.

== History ==
Construction of Duvha Power Station started in November 1975 and the last unit came into operation in 1984.

In 1993 Duvha became the first power station in the world to be retrofitted with pulse jet fabric filter plants on three of its six units. These plants contribute largely to the reduction of air pollution by removing 99.99% of the fly ash, which otherwise would be released into the air through the station's chimneys.

On 8 January 2003, Unit 2 generator exploded while being returned to service after a malfunction. On 9 February 2011 another unit failed catastrophically while performing over speed testing. The units are over speed rated at 3600 rpm and the last recorded speed before failure was 4250 rpm.

It was the first power station in South Africa to have a black power station manager, Ehud Matya.

== Power generation ==
The station consists of six 600 MW units with a total installed capacity of 3,600 MW operating with a turbine efficiency of 37.6%.

The station is a twin sister to Tutuka Power Station.

== Corruption allegations ==
In April 2017 General Electric filed a court application accusing Eskom of rigging the tender to install a new boiler at the station so that Dongfang Electric would get the contract even though their bid was R1 billion (US$76 million) more than the General Electric bid.

== See also ==
- Fossil-fuel power plant
- List of power stations in South Africa
