= Brian Ngqulunga =

South African askari (1948–1990)

- Born: Brian Boy Elliot Ngqulunga; 17 August 1948
- Died: 19 July 1990 (aged 41); Brits near Pretoria
- Cause of death: Assassination with an AK-47 rifle
- Resting place: Vlakplaas (exhumed 1998); Soshanguve cemetery
- Occupation: Askari
- Organization: Security Branch
- Spouse: Catherine Ngqulunga (m. 1984)
- Children: Two

Brian Boy Elliot Ngqulunga (17 August 1948 – 19 July 1990) was a South African askari for the apartheid regime who was based in Vlakplaas. First served as a member of the African National Congress (ANC), then turned a counterinsurgent police informer, Ngqulunga was recruited as a constable of the Security Branch in Vlakplaas. He was assassinated in 1990 by his own colleagues over suspicions of disclosing clandestine and incriminating police secrets to insurgents of the ANC.

When recruited to the police, Ngqulunga first reported to Captain Dirk Coetzee and later to Colonel Eugene de Kock who successively commanded the Vlakplaas counterinsurgent death squad. He was a close friend of Joe Mamasela, also an askari at Vlakplaas.

On 19 November 1981, Ngqulunga, Mamasela, Coetzee and two other policemen – Almond Nofomela and David Tshikalanga – drove to the home of prominent human rights lawyer and ANC activist Griffiths Mxenge in Umlazi and murdered him, stabbing him 45 times all over his body and slit his throat.

Since its establishment in the 1970s, the Vlakplaas death squad operated as a secretive unit of the South African Police targeting ANC and Pan Africanist Congress (PAC) activists and its clandestine inhumane activities were only exposed in 1989 by Nofomela and Coetzee after both fell out with commanders of the police system, shocking revelations that led to public pressure being put on apartheid state President F.W. de Klerk to establish the Harms Commission of Inquiry to investigate the allegations of the existence of a death squad within the police structure.

Ngqulunga was called to testify at the commission on the issue and on Mxenge's murder but flatly denied his or the police's involvement in Mxenge's murder as well as allegations of the hits squad's existence. Mamasela also testified and they were given a R1,000 each by Major-General Krappies Engelbrecht for covering up Vlakplaas at the commission.

== Death and burial ==
Ngqulunga was abducted, severely tortured and killed on the night of 19 July 1990 by his Vlakplaas colleagues. At the Truth and Reconciliation Commission (TRC) in February 1997, it was revealed by Ngqulunga's wife, Catherine, that since he testified at the Harms Commission his relationship with his white colleagues at Vlakplaas deteriorated and had asked to be transferred to police headquarters in Pretoria just to be away from the Vlakplaas environment. The TRC also learnt from other testimonies that since his transfer to head office Ngqulunga had begun making contacts to the African National Congress (ANC) about possible defection or help spill the beans about Griffiths Mxenge's murder and the clandestine operations of the Vlakplaas death squad, as did Almond Nofomela and Dirk Coetzee earlier. An instruction from head office commanders, Lieutenant-General Nick van Rensburg and Major-General Krappies Engelbrecht was given to Colonel Eugene de Kock, commander of Vlakplaas, to "silence" Ngqulunga. De Kock instructed Dave Baker, a white Warrant Officer at Vlakplaas, to put together a team of policemen to carry out the plan to kill Ngqulunga and Baker suggested the name of Constable Simon Radebe, an askari at Vlakplaas, as the person who could help lure Ngqulanga to the spot where they would kill him. Radebe, who was admitted at the Laudium Hospital in Centurion for diabetics, was visited on 18 July 1990 by two of his white colleagues, Sergeant Willie Nortje and Sergeant Douw Willemse, who instructed him to discharge himself from hospital as he was needed at his workplace for a mission with Ngqulunga (it was usual as askaris always received instructions from their white colleagues to do particular jobs). He was told to come with Ngqulunga to a particular spot outside Atteridgeville on the night of 19 July 1990 pretending they would enjoy drinks and see women; and when Radebe parked his car at the discussed spot a group of policemen, Baker, Riaan Bellingan, Wouter Mentz and Piet Botha, pounced and violently took Ngqulunga out of Radebe's car and swiftly left with him in a hired VW kombi. At a particular spot outside Brits, they stopped and took him out of the kombi and Baker fatally fired at him with an AK-47. The choice of gun used in the killing was deliberate to create the impression that he was murdered by ANC or Pan Africanist Congress (PAC) guerillas who used AK-47s in their war against the apartheid system

=== Funeral and burial ===
When the people of Shoshanguve heard that Ngqulunga had been killed and preparations were being made to bury him in the area, they protested and said an askari would not be buried in the area – threatening that they would dig out the corpse and burn it. Arrangements were therefore made for him to be buried at Vlakplaas. He was exhumed in 1998 – four years after the fall of apartheid – and reburied in Shoshanguve
