= Lothar Neethling =

South African police commissioner (1935–2005)

General Lothar Paul Neethling (29 August 1935 in East Prussia – 11 July 2005) was chief deputy commissioner (second-in-command) of the South African Police in the apartheid era.

A highly qualified scientist, General Neethling was alleged to have used police forensic laboratories for the production of poisons to kill anti-apartheid activists, and to have developed chemical and biological weapons for use against the black population in South Africa.

He died of lung cancer in Pretoria, aged 69.

== War orphan ==
In 1948, Afrikaners who were supporters of defeated Nazi Germany in World War II came up with a plan to adopt as many as 10,000 war orphans, in light of the horrendous circumstances they endured after the war. In the event, the German Children's Fund (GCF) managed to finance a group of only 83 orphans who arrived in Cape Town in September 1948. One of them was 13-year-old Lothar Paul Tietz, who was adopted by the GCF chairman, Dr J C Neethling. In turn Lothar Neethling, cutting his ties with Germany soon after his arrival, adopted South Africa as his "new fatherland".

He excelled academically and, having absorbed all the elements of the Boer culture in his teenage years, was fully accepted into the Afrikaner community.

Newspaper reporter Max du Preez claimed Neethling described himself as a "staunch Christian."

== Scientist ==
Lothar Neethling gained two doctorates in chemistry, one of which was from the University of California. He was a prominent member of the Afrikaans Academy of Arts and Science, which awarded him its gold medal.

More widely, he was regarded as a brilliant scientist and was honoured by a number of international scientific organisations as well as receiving a medal from the government of Taiwan.

== Police officer ==
In 1971, Neethling founded the South African Police (SAP) forensics unit and in succeeding years was awarded seven SAP medals for forensic work undertaken. By the late 1970s, he had risen rapidly to become SAP's second-in-command, chief deputy commissioner.

On 20 October 1986, following Mozambique president Samora Machel's death in an air crash in South Africa, Neethling confiscated the aircraft's flight data and cockpit voice recorders at the scene of the crash. Reportedly on instructions from foreign minister, Pik Botha, he then refused to allow International Civil Aviation Organization and South African Civil Aviation Bureau (CAB) crash investigators access to the flight recorders. CAB director, Rennie van Zyl, had to serve a writ on Botha and Neethling before eventually receiving the two recorders on 11 November 1986. The three-week delay in starting the crash investigation was confirmed by SAP Colonel Des Lynch in evidence to the Truth and Reconciliation Commission in 2001.

== Lothar's potion ==
Three years later, in 1989, Neethling's reputation as a "genius chemist" became tarnished after revelations by a former commander of the SAP's Vlakplaas death squad, Dirk Coetzee, were published in the anti-apartheid newspaper Vrye Weekblad. Coetzee revealed that Neethling had developed a poison – Lothar's potion – which Coetzee would collect either from Neethling's home or from his laboratory, and administer to ANC cadres. The Weekly Mail also covered Coetzee's story.

Neethling denied Coetzee's allegations and sued each newspaper R1 million for defamation, but lost the case because the judge, Johann Kriegler, declared him to be an unreliable witness. Neethling was represented by Barry Roux, the lawyer who later defended Oscar Pistorius. Neethling remained in his post, and, with funding by the South African government, appealed against the judgment. The legal costs of the appeal, which took nearly five years, amounted to over R2 million. The Appeal Court found that Judge Kriegler had erred in the lower court, the appeal went in Neethling's favour, and he was awarded R90,000 for defamation. After being ordered to pay Neethling's costs, Vrye Weekblad was forced into bankruptcy and closed in February 1994. The newspaper's editor, Max du Preez, maintained that Neethling had lied in court and, after TRC hearings in September 1997, laid criminal charges of murder, perjury and fraud against him. However, according to du Preez, his charges against Neethling were never thoroughly investigated.

== See also ==
- Eugene de Kock
- Josef Mengele
- Mozambican Tupolev Tu-134 air disaster
- Craig Williamson
- Wouter Basson
