= Nicolaas Deetlefs =

South African police officer (born 1950)

Personal details
- Born: Nicolaas Johannes Deetlefs; 1950 (age 75–76)
- Spouse: Sylvia Deetlefs
- Known for: Security Branch officer, alleged torturer
- Police career
- Department: Security Branch
- Service years: 1979–1994

Nicolaas Johannes Deetlefs (also Nick Deetlefs or Nic Deetlefs; born 1950) is a former South African policeman and alleged torturer under Apartheid. He interrogated anti-Apartheid activists who were detained at Johannesburg's John Foster Square under the infamous Terrorism Act from 1979 until the end of Apartheid in 1994. Allegations of assaulting and assassinating some of his detainees who mysteriously died while in holding cells were levelled against Deetlefs.

== Career ==
Deetlefts started his detective career in 1979 at John Vorster Square police station in central Johannesburg. A Warrant Officer who got promoted to Captain, Deetlefs was stationed on the 10th floor of John Foster Square, where he interrogated detained anti-Apartheid activists until 1994 when the Apartheid regime collapsed. He was one of the fourteen police officers who interrogated Neil Aggett from 28 January to 2 February 1982. On 5 February 1982, Aggett was found dead in his cell.

In the 1980s complaints of police brutality were brought against the Security Branch and Deetlets' name was mentioned regularly by victims, amongst them Barbara Hogan who laid a charge of assault against Deetlefs in 1981 for assaulting her during interrogation while she was detained at John Foster Square for anti-apartheid activities.

Deetlefs was one of the police officers tasked by the apartheid government to interrogate Janusz Waluś and Clive Derby-Lewis after the assassination of Chris Hani on 10 April 1993. During the Hani trial, lawyers for both Walus and Derby-Lewis accused Deetlefs of extracting confessions from the two using illegal methods, after it was discovered that Deetlefs drank alcohol with Walus while pretending he was not investigating him and which allowed him to extract confessions of the high-profile murder from the drunk Walus.

== Testimony to government inquiries ==
In 2020, Deetlefs was hauled before an inquiry established by the South African government probing the mysterious death of the 28-year-old Aggett and he denied he ever assaulted Aggett nor helped the police to cover up this crime. However, he confessed to knowing of covered-ups of assaults and torture of detainees, which included electric shock, at John Vorster Square. He admitted to abusing Frank Chikane. He told the inquiry that Aggett committed suicide five days later after feeling ashamed of himself for disclosing the names of his comrades to police. Aggett was found hanging on a cloth fastened to window bars. Other witnesses who were detainees at the time said they saw Aggett was not able to walk after being interrogated days before his death, suggesting he was tortured. Officers say he committed suicide, but his family rejects that claim.

He also told the inquiry about another anti-apartheid activist, Stanza Bopape, whom he interrogated too and who was electrocuted on the 10th floor of John Vorster Square on 8 August 1982, and said then the police officers at John Foster Square took his body to Mpumalanga where the body was blow-up and thrown into a river full of crocodiles. Bopape was sold out by police spy Joe Mamasela, Deetlefs told the inquiry.

Deetlefs is one of senior Security Branch officers who never appeared before the Truth and Reconciliation Commission to ask for amnesty for violations of human rights during apartheid.

== External references ==
- High Court judgement: Re-opened inquest into the murder of Neil Aggrett
