= Joe Mamasela =

South African government spy (born 1953)

- Born: June 2, 1953 (age 73); Soweto, South Africa
- Known for: policeman torturer assassin askari

Joe Mamasela (born June 2, 1953) is a former National Party (NP) government spy and assassin who was involved in the torture and murders or assassinations of many anti-apartheid activists including Griffiths Mxenge. Mamasela was an askari and part of the Vlakplaas counterinsurgency unit under the command of Eugene de Kock.

== Early life ==
Mamasela was born in Soweto, South Africa on June 2, 1953. His mother lived in a domestic suburb and would visit Mamasela and his siblings when she could. Mamasela was the last of six children, all of whom died during the years of Apartheid. The Mamasela children lived with their grandmother in Tladistad. Their grandmother's home was turned into a shebeen in later years in order to support the family's income. Mamasela attended Western Central Jabavu but left school in Standard 9, the equivalent of Grade 11. Due to the threat of violence in his town Mamasela started training in karate and became known for his fighting skills.

== Personal life ==
Mamasela married Nombi Dube shortly after he left school, when she became pregnant with their son Sizwe. The couple later divorced, allegedly due to rumours of Dube's infidelity. Mamasela later remarried and had two sons and a daughter by his second wife.

He was also a close friend of murdered askari Brian Ngqulunga.

== Politics ==
Mamasela became a student activist in his earlier years due to his interest in South African politics. He later was promoted to the position of Secretary-General of the South African Student Movement at his school. The history of how Mamasela came to be an askari at Vlakplaas is contentious. Mamasela claims he joined the African National Congress in Botswana in 1977, after having been recruited by Snuki Zikalala, but was arrested by security police. Mamasela's account follows that he was tortured by the security police until he broke, giving information and agreeing to become an askari for the security force.

An alternative account provided by journalist Jacques Pauw states that Mamasela became a police informant in 1979 after he had been arrested for housebreaking and theft. He then infiltrated the ANC in Botswana and underwent intelligence training. After his cover was blown, Mamasela escaped and joined the unit at Vlakplaas.

== Secret police ==
Mamasela was part of the Vlakplaas police unit run by Apartheid colonel Eugene de Kock in the 1980s. Mamasela publicly confessed to taking part in the abduction and murder of Port Elizabeth activists Sipho Hashe, Qawawuli Godolozi and Champion Galela, known as the Pebco Three, in May 1985. He was also involved in the killing of youth activists, the Mamelodi Ten, in 1986 and Durban human rights lawyer Griffiths Mxenge. In return for providing the then Transvaal Attorney-General with the names of former security police members involved in human rights abuses during Apartheid, he was granted indemnity from prosecution. Mamasela allegedly kept a dossier detailing the killings, torture and abduction that took place at Vlakplaas which he used in a deal with the Attorney-General. Despite admitting to killing these and other activists, Mamasela refused to testify before the Truth and Reconciliation Commission or apply for amnesty.

== Murder charge ==
In 2011, Mamasela was charged with the murder of his landlord, Lali Joseph Nhlapo. After three days on the run, Mamasela handed himself in, and stood trial in 2011. Mamasela claimed to have shot Nhlapo in self-defence, while state witnesses claimed that Nhlapo was unarmed and shot at point-blank range.
