= Vrye Weekblad =

Anti-apartheid Afrikaans national weekly newspaper

- Dink vir jouself (English: "Think for yourself")
- A screenshot of the Vrye Weekblad (English edition) website from 20 March 2024.
- Founder(s): Max du Preez; Jacques Pauw
- Publisher: Arena Holdings
- Editor: Max du Preez; Anneliese Burgess
- Founded: November 1988
- Ceased publication: 28 May 1993; 28 March 2025
- Relaunched: 6 April 2019
- Political alignment: Apartheid era (1988-1994): Anti-establishment; Anti-apartheid; Online era (2019-2025): Independent
- Language: Afrikaans & English
- Headquarters: Cape Town
- Country: South Africa
- Website: www.vryeweekblad.com

Vrye Weekblad was a progressive South African Afrikaans-language national weekly newspaper that was launched in November 1988 by journalist Max du Preez, and forced to close in February 1994. It was then relaunched as an online newspaper in 2019, before closing again in 2025. The paper was noted for its anti-apartheid stance making it a notable outlier in the Afrikaans language media of the 1980s and early 1990s. The paper was initially driven into bankruptcy by the legal costs of defending its charge that South African Police General Lothar Neethling had supplied poison to security police to kill activists.

It was relaunched in a digital format on 6 April 2019 by Tiso Blackstar Group (later Arena Holdings), with Max du Preez returning as editor and Anneliese Burgess as co-editor. A new edition was published every Friday on the Vrye Weekblad website, in both Afrikaans and English, and it was later taken over by the NVWB Media Groep. The final issue was published on 28 March 2025.

== History ==
Vrye Weekblad (literally Free/Liberated Weekly, with "free" as in expression of opinion) was started as a result of frustration on the part of Afrikaner journalists who thought that the mainstream Afrikaans-language and English-language media lacked the courage to take on the apartheid state in South Africa. The paper was collectively owned by the founder members, who included editor Max du Preez and journalist Jacques Pauw. The editorial staff for the first edition of February 1989 comprised Karien Norval, du Preez, Elsabe Wessels, Chris du Plessis, Pauw, Victor Munnik, and Koos Coetzee.

== Threat to apartheid state ==
From the outset the state viewed the upstart paper as a threat. The Minister of Justice, Kobie Coetsee, raised the cost of registering the newspaper from R10 to R40,000. As the owners could not pay, the first few editions of Vrye Weekblad appeared on the street illegally, and they were taken to court. In December 1988, former state president P. W. Botha sued Vrye Weekblad for R200,000 for defamation after the newspaper had exposed his links with a Mafia gangster. The case was dropped when Botha had a stroke early in 1989. Later that year, seven charges under state of emergency legislation were levied against Vrye Weekblad for advertising a meeting of a banned organisation. On 17 November 1989 it published extensive confessions of Dirk Coetzee, a former commander of the Police Death Squad at Vlakplaas. The story was published worldwide but none of the mainstream South African media covered it.

In May 1990, the newspaper revealed the inner secrets of the Civil Cooperation Bureau (CCB) and described how Pieter Botes, a CCB commander, tried to kill anti-apartheid activist Albie Sachs in Maputo in 1988, and tried to undermine SWAPO in the run-up to the November 1989 elections in Namibia. In 1991, a powerful bomb wrecked the offices of Vrye Weekblad. A CCB operative, Leonard Veenendal, later confessed to having planted the bomb.

In 1991 Judge Johann Kriegler ruled in favour of Vrye Weekblad in the Rand Supreme Court. But the Appeals Court overturned Kriegler's decision and ordered the paper to pay R90,000 and costs. (The ensuing legal battle cost both sides R2 million over five years and forced the paper to close).

The African National Congress (ANC) criticized journalist Jacques Pauw's report in the 17 January 1992 issue that Patrick Lekota had offered money to a right-winger to assassinate Glory "September" Sidebe. Sidebe was a former ANC member who worked with Vlakplaas death squads, while Lekota was then a member of the ANC's National Executive Committee.

Just prior to its closure the paper was published out of an old bank building in Newtown, Johannesburg.

== Vlakplaas revelations ==
Late in 1989, Vrye Weekblad established contact with Captain Dirk Coetzee, the commander in charge of the South African Police's secret elite unit, Section C1, who were stationed at Vlakplaas, a farm southwest of Pretoria. This elite section formed part of President P.W. Botha's so-called "Total Strategy", and were supposed to disable opponents to Botha's apartheid regime, whenever the country's courts were unable to do so. Section C1's methods included assassination, kidnapping, poisoning and execution. Coetzee also revealed that General Lothar Neethling had supplied poison to the police, which would drug and eventually kill anti-apartheid activists. Well aware that it could have serious consequences for the newspaper, Vrye Weekblad decided not to withdraw Neethling's name from their reports.

The newspaper arranged for Coetzee to be safely taken out of South Africa and he eventually found asylum in The Netherlands. On 17 November 1989, the story about Vlakplaas broke on the front page of Vrye Weekblad. The story was also used by other alternative newspapers in South Africa, although the local mainstream media preferred to ignore the story or deny its truthfulness. Across the world, however, the reports of Vlakplaas received widespread coverage.

The revelations about Section C1 prompted more revelations from other policemen and army officials about the dirty activities at Vlakplaas and other government institutions. In 1994, Colonel Eugene de Kock (who operated Vlakplaas at the time of the revelations), was given two life-sentences and an additional 212 years in prison, on charges of among other things, murder, attempted murder, culpable homicide, kidnapping, assault and corruption.

Following the revelations of the 1989 court case Neethling sued news agencies including Vrye Weekblad for defamation and was represented in court by Barry Roux. The judges of the Bloemfontein Appellate Division declared that both Neethling and Coetzee had probably lied, and it was impossible to determine the truth. Nonetheless, they found that Vrye Weekblad had defamed Neethling, and ordered it to pay him R90,000 plus legal costs. This ultimately led to the bankruptcy and closure of the Vrye Weekblad in February 1994.

== Breaking news ==
According to Du Preez's submission to the Truth and Reconciliation Commission, Vrye Weekblad revealed:

- November 1988: Eugene de Kock is the new commanding officer of the Vlakplaas unit and committed a number of murders, including those of eight people in Piet Retief
- December 1989: Siphiwe Mthimkulu was tortured and poisoned by the Eastern Cape security police and was seen in SAP company on 14 April 1982
- January 1990: police tortured prisoners and supported Inkatha vigilantes against United Democratic Front supporters, and murdered activist David Mazwai
- February 1990: a professor was an agent of the National Intelligence Service (the revelation led to a fine of R7,000 in terms of the Protection of Information Act)
- May 1990: the secret Civil Cooperation Bureau (CCB) was run by the South African Defence Force. Later CCB member Pieter Botes explained how he bombed Albie Sachs in Maputo in 1988, how the CCB operated against the South-West Africa People's Organisation and assassinated Anton Lubowski
- August 1991: police agent Larry Barnett transferred large amounts of money from the South African Police to Inkatha, and provided Inkatha with weapons
- June 1992: dirty secrets of the State Security Council

== Bibliography ==
- Du Preez, Max (2005). Oranje, Blanje, Blues: 'n Nostalgiese Trip - Vrye Weekblad 88-94. Kaapstad: Zebra Press. ISBN 1-77007-119-9.
- Du Preez, Max (2003). Pale Native: Memories of a Renegade Reporter. Cape Town: Zebra Press. ISBN 978-1-86872-913-5.

== See also ==
- List of newspapers in South Africa
