= Security Branch (South Africa) =

State intelligence agency, 1947 to 1991

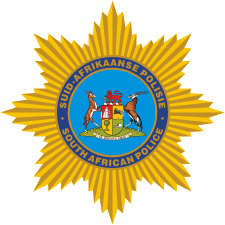
- Badge of the South African Police

Service overview
- Formed: 1947
- Dissolved: April 1991
- Type: Security police, Secret police and Special police
- Jurisdiction: South Africa
- Status: Defunct
- Headquarters: Wachthuis, Pretorius Street Pretoria, South Africa
- Parent service: South African Police

The Security Branch of the South African Police, established in 1947 as the Special Branch, was the security police apparatus of the apartheid state in South Africa. From the 1960s to the 1980s, it was one of the three main state entities responsible for intelligence gathering, the others being the Bureau for State Security (later the National Intelligence Service) and the Military Intelligence division of the South African Defence Force. In 1987, at its peak, the Security Branch accounted for only thirteen percent of police personnel, but it wielded great influence as the "elite" service of the police.

In addition to collecting and evaluating intelligence, the Branch also had operational units, which acted in neighbouring countries as well as inside South Africa, and it housed at least one paramilitary death squad, under the notorious Section C1 headquartered at Vlakplaas. It is also well known for recruiting askaris (informants, double agents, and defectors), and for the systematic use of torture and numerous deaths in its detention facilities. Branch officers carried out the murders of Ruth First, Ahmed Timol, the Pebco Three, and The Cradock Four, among many other anti-apartheid activists; Steve Biko died in Security Branch custody after being severely beaten by officers. Famous Branch investigations include those leading to the 1956 Treason Trial, the 1963 Rivonia Trial, the 1964 Little Rivonia Trial, and the 1990 Operation Vula trial. It also carried out "Stratcom" disinformation and "dirty tricks" operations which some have likened to a "propaganda war" against the African National Congress.

The Truth and Reconciliation Commission (TRC) found that the Security Branch engaged in "massive and systematic destruction of records" in 1992 and 1993, following an instruction from head office in 1992. As a result, the details of many of the Branch's operations remain unknown or uncorroborated. Several former members, though a small proportion of the overall staff complement, submitted amnesty applications to the TRC and testified at length about the Branch's involvement in extrajudicial killings and other human rights violations.

== History ==
=== 1947–1950s: Suppression of communism ===
The Branch was established as the Special Branch of the South African Police (SAP) in 1947 under the command of Hendrik Jacobus "Fly" du Plooy. Du Plooy, who headed the Branch until he was replaced by Willem Carl "Sampie" Prinsloo in 1954, said that he was asked to use the Branch "to combat Communism more actively." The Branch became the leading agency in the administration and enforcement of the Suppression of Communism Act of 1950 upon its enactment in July. Because the Act defined communism remarkably broadly – as more or less any form of subversion – the Branch thus secured a broad role in political matters and matters of national security. Perhaps the most famous application of the Act is the prosecution of Nelson Mandela and 155 other anti-Apartheid activists during the 1956 Treason Trial, which followed a series of investigations, raids, and arrests by the Security Branch.

=== 1960s–1980s: Expansion ===
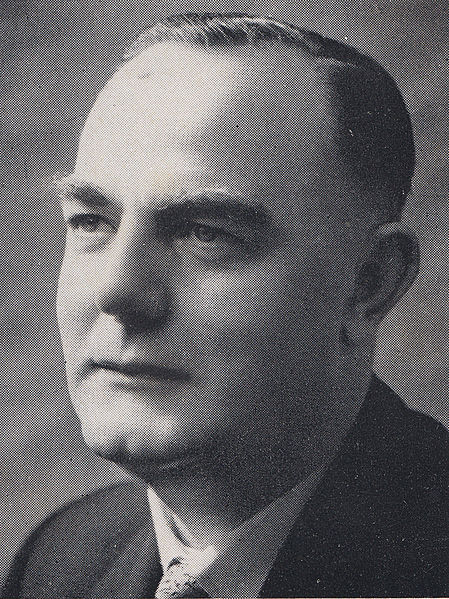
As Minister of Justice and Prime Minister, John Vorster presided over the expansion of the Security Branch

The early 1960s in South Africa were characterised by an intensification of political repression, following the Sharpeville massacre; the banning of the African National Congress (ANC) and the Pan Africanist Congress (PAC) and the establishment of their military wings, Umhonto weSizwe (MK) and Poqo; and the beginning of the armed struggle, including a year-long sabotage campaign by MK. At this time, the Security Branch had a modest staff complement of about 200 officers, of whom about half were black. In 1963, however, Hendrik van den Bergh was appointed commanding officer of the Branch, and it hardened and expanded during his tenure. The SAP's budget increased significantly in subsequent years, with much of the increase absorbed by the Branch. By 1964, all four floors of the Compol Building in Pretoria, which previously had housed the broader SAP, were occupied by the Branch's national headquarters.

The Branch's surveillance capabilities improved in the 1960s, and it interrogated a large number of political detainees during the first half of the decade. With the blessing of Minister of Justice John Vorster, van den Bergh set up a special unit, known as the "Sabotage Squad," to monitor and interrogate anti-Apartheid activists. The Sabotage Squad was a forerunner to later Branch units: it was during this period that the Branch secured its enduring reputation for brutality and torture, with Branch interrogators like Theunis "Rooi Rus" Swanepoel gaining notoriety among activists. Joe Slovo contrasted the Branch officers of this era and beyond with earlier security police in South Africa, who he said were "gentlemanly" by comparison. It was later established that several Security Branch officers, including Swanepoel, received training in interrogation techniques in foreign countries, including in France, which was known for having used torture extensively during the Algerian War of Independence.

Only months after van den Bergh's appointment, the Branch orchestrated the raid on Liliesleaf Farm which led to the Rivonia Trial. It is uncertain exactly what intelligence led the Branch to conduct the raid, but it probably had an informant inside the ANC. The same week, Van den Bergh told the Sunday Times that the Branch had "virtually smashed" the country's various subversive political organisations: "All that remains are the remnants, who will be rounded up in time." At the trial, defendant Elias Motsoaledi told the judge that Branch officers had "assaulted" him during interrogation.

Also early in his tenure as commanding officer, Van den Bergh founded Republican Intelligence, South Africa's first covert national intelligence service and a direct offshoot of the Security Branch – many Branch officers were transferred to staff it. By 1969, Republican Intelligence had been replaced by the Bureau for State Security, which van den Bergh left the Branch to run.

==== Enabling legislation ====
The Internal Security Act of 1982 gave the Branch extensive powers

From the 1960s onward, the Suppression of Communism Act was supplemented with a host of security legislation which expanded the Branch's powers. Detention without trial in non-emergency situations was allowed, for up to twelve days, from 1961. Thereafter were introduced the following:

- The General Law Amendment Act of 1962 broadened the definition of sabotage and extended the Minister's power to impose banning orders;
- The General Law Amendment Act of 1963 allowed SAP officers to detain suspects without a warrant, and without access to a lawyer, for up to ninety days. In practice, detainees could be held indefinitely without trial, because the 90-day period could be renewed if further interrogation was deemed necessary;
- Section 22 of the General Law Amendment Act of 1966 provided for short-term "preventive" detention for up to fourteen days (also renewable); and
- The Terrorism Act of 1967 provided for indefinite detention without trial in solitary confinement for the purposes of interrogation.

The Internal Security Act of 1982 consolidated and extended the provisions in these and other laws and remained in effect, with some amendments, until the democratic transition. Police also had remarkably extensive powers of search and seizure. In this legislative environment, the Branch was often able to detain people in poor conditions without the knowledge of their families or lawyers, and it is suspected to have been responsible for numerous forced disappearances.

=== 1990s: Democratic transition ===
==== Harms Commission ====
In November 1989, Butana Almond Nofomela, a black Branch officer, caused a scandal when he alleged on death row that he had belonged to one of five death squads operating under the Branch out of Vlakplaas farm, later revealed to be the headquarters of the Branch's Section C1. He claimed that the Branch had brutally killed anti-apartheid activist Griffiths Mxenge in 1981, and that he had participated in or witnessed other extrajudicial killings committed by the Branch. His claims were corroborated in the Vrye Weekblad by the Section's former commanding officer, Dirk Coetzee, and by David Tshikalange, another Branch officer. Adriaan Vlok, Minister of Law and Order, denied the allegations and said they were part of a plot to undermine the security police "to make it easier to bring about... a Communist state." By the end of the month, the McNally Commission, led by Tim McNally, Attorney General of the Orange Free State, had investigated and submitted to President F.W. de Klerk a report which discounted the allegations.

In January 1990, however, under mounting pressure from civil society, de Klerk appointed Judge Louis Harms to investigate the allegations, under the Commission of Inquiry into Certain Alleged Murders, better known as the Harms Commission. The commission's terms of reference were broad: to inquire into political murders and political violence committed in South Africa "with political aims," and it investigated the Civil Cooperation Bureau as well as the Security Branch squads at Vlakplaas. Its report, released in November 1990, was "famously vacuous": it did not name any specific units or officers as participants in death squads, and it was denounced by anti-apartheid groups as a whitewash. Meanwhile, sometime in 1990, the Branch sent a parcel bomb to Coetzee in Lusaka. Officers sent the parcel under the name of Bheki Mlangeni, a human rights lawyer who had represented several clients during the Harms Commission, but Coetzee was suspicious and returned it to its ostensible sender in Johannesburg. Some months later, in February 1991, it exploded, killing Mlangeni. Another Section C1 operative who testified at the commission, Brian Ngqulunga, was killed by his handlers at Vlakplaas in July 1990.

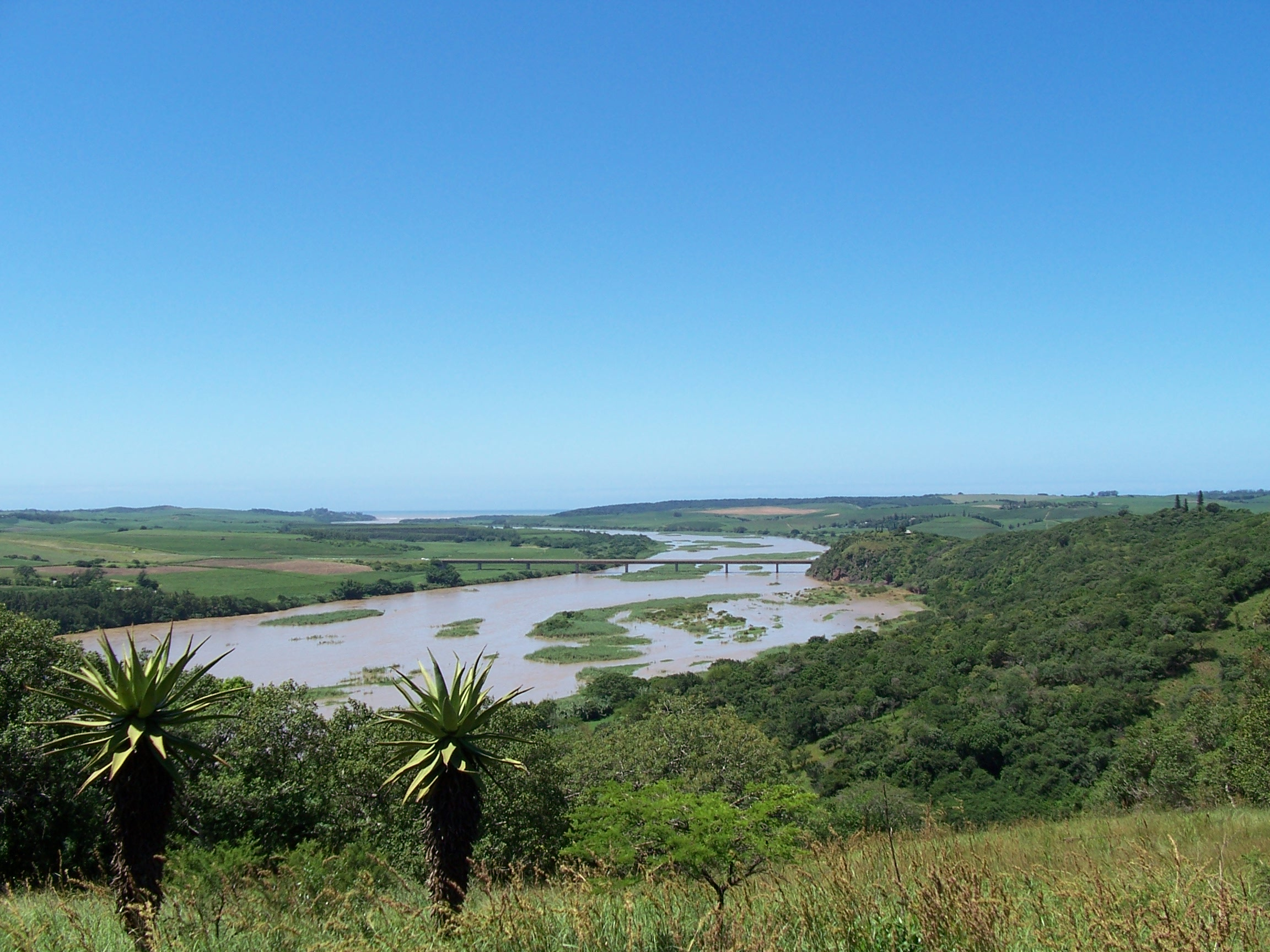
Tugela River mouth, where Durban officers killed two ANC activists in 1990

==== Operation Vula ====
The Security Branch achieved its last major public triumph in July 1990, when its Durban division uncovered Operation Vula. Operation Vula was an ANC project which sought to smuggle arms and activists into the country and to establish an underground network linking domestic activist structures with the ANC in exile. It was initiated in 1986 but, controversially, had continued to operate despite the resolutions of the May 1990 Groote Schuur Minute. At a raid in Durban, the Branch found evidence of the operation, including communications between underground structures and the ANC headquarters in Lusaka. A series of arrests followed, and at least eight operatives were charged with terrorism, although they were later indemnified. Among those arrested were Pravin Gordhan, Mac Maharaj, Billy Nair, and Siphiwe Nyanda. Two ANC operatives detained in July, Charles Ndaba and Mbuso Shabalala, were missing until 1998, when the Truth and Reconciliation Commission (TRC) found that they had been arrested and killed by the Security Branch and their bodies thrown in the Tugela River. According to the testimony of a Branch officer, Ndaba and Shabalala were killed after refusing to turn on the ANC. The officer also claimed that Ndaba had previously been a Branch informant, but the ANC denied this and portrayed the Branch as having stumbled upon Vula by chance.

Demise

In April 1991, the Security Branch was effectively reabsorbed into SAP structures. It was merged with the Criminal Investigation Department of the SAP into a new Crime Combatting and Investigation (CCI) unit, the Branch-derived side of which was designated the Crime Information Service. During the merger, the Branch was restructured and functions reallocated. However, the CCI was placed under the command of Basie Smit, the outgoing commander of the Branch, and the Branch's organisational and command structure was reportedly little changed. It was during this period that officers systematically destroyed the Branch's records.

=== Later revelations ===
==== Inkathagate and Goldstone Commission ====
In 1991, the Weekly Mail broke the so-called Inkathagate scandal, revealing that the Security Branch, on behalf of the state, had provided R250 000 in covert support to ANC rival Inkatha Freedom Party and R1.5 million to its trade union, the United Workers' Union of South Africa. The funding was paid directly to a secret account of Inkatha leader Mangosuthu Buthelezi. According to one document leaked by a Branch officer, the support was designed to be used to "show everyone that [Buthelezi] has a strong base." The scandal was highly inflammatory, arriving as it did during a tense phase of the negotiations to end apartheid and amid severe political violence between ANC and Inkatha supporters, which the ANC alleged were being stoked by a state-aligned "third force." It led to Vlok's demotion from the Ministry of Law and Order.

The Goldstone Commission, established in October 1991 to investigate political violence in South Africa, published a 1994 report containing evidence that members of the Security Branch, especially members of the former Section C1, sold weapons to Inkatha between 1991 and 1994. By then, C1 had been redesignated C10 under CCI, and was ostensibly responsible for investigating illegal trafficking in weapons. Goldstone Commission investigators also found that, during the inquiry, the head of the C-Section had ordered the destruction of all documentation relating to SAP's relationship with Inkatha. According to the Mail & Guardian, the Commission advised President F. W. de Klerk to give "urgent attention" to the former Security Branch, which it had found to be the principal branch of the SAP implicated in "criminal and despicable actions." The report of the Steyn Commission – written in 1992, partially leaked in 1997, and declassified in 2006 – confirmed that the Branch had smuggled AK-47s to Inkatha from outside South Africa.

==== Truth and Reconciliation Commission ====
When the TRC was set up to investigate human rights violations during Apartheid, several former Security Branch officers submitted applications for amnesty and testified. The TRC implied that this was partly due to Eugene de Kock, the prolific commander of operational unit C1 at Vlakplaas from 1985. He was one of the first people to submit an amnesty application, and he proved eager to disclose in detail the crimes of the Branch and the names of officers involved. About half of the amnesty applications from former Security Branch officers were in relation to incidents involving de Kock, and, of the eighty-one former Branch officers who submitted applications, forty-seven had been based in C1. Much of what is known about the Security Branch was revealed or proved for the first time during the TRC hearings. By the time the hearings began, the SAP had been formally disbanded and reconstituted as the South African Police Service.

== Organisational structure ==
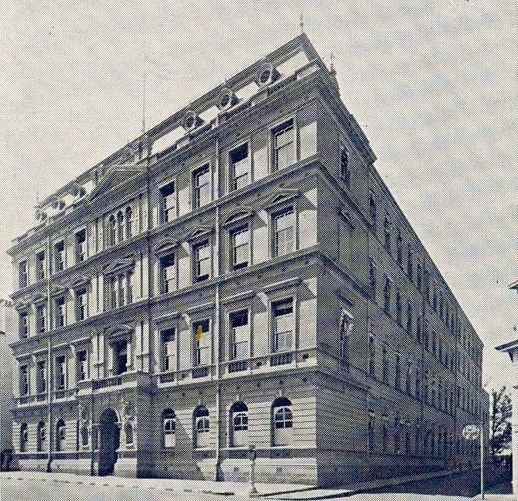
The Compol Building in 1938

The Branch's national headquarters were in Pretoria, at the Compol Building (also called the New Government Building) from November 1963 and then at Wachthuis from 1967. There were nineteen regional Security Branch divisions, including divisions for the Witswatersrand (headquartered in Johannesburg at John Vorster Square), the Western Transvaal (headquartered in Potchefstroom), the Eastern Transvaal (Middelburg), the Northern Transvaal (Pretoria), the Far Northern Transvaal (Pietersburg), the Eastern Cape (Port Elizabeth), Border (East London), the Western Cape (Cape Town), the Northern Cape (Kimberley), the Orange Free State (Bloemfontein), the West Rand (Krugersdorp), the East Rand (Springs), Port Natal (Durban), Natal (Pietermaritzburg), Northern Natal (Newcastle), and Soweto. Each division had its own branches, several of which, in the north of the country, were at border posts, where the Branch could monitor the movements of exiles. There was also a division for Oshakati in what was then South West Africa.

In the 1980s, the Branch had 14 sections, many of which had their own regional units or divisions, and which included research desks for the ANC, PAC, and South African Communist Party (SACP). Several sections were renamed and redesignated during the 1991 restructuring. In the 1980s, however, the sections were the following:

- Sections A: Information collection
- Section B: Informants
- Section C: Anti-terrorism
- Section D: State property
- Section E: Detainees
- Section F: Inter-departmental and research
- Section G: Foreign intelligence
- Section H: Secret funds
- Section J: Liaison to the State Security Council and its joint management centres
- Section K: Inspectorate
- Section L: Database and information centre
- Section M: Namibia
- Section N: Technical
- Section O: Training

The best known of these sections, the C-Section and G-Section, are notable primarily for their prominent role in countering resistance to apartheid.

== C-Section: Anti-terrorism ==
The C-Section of the Security Branch, founded in 1979, was nominally its "anti-terrorism" unit, and housed its counterinsurgency and counterintelligence activities, with almost exclusive focus on the domestic anti-apartheid movement. The TRC called it the "special forces" of the Branch.

=== C1: Operations (Vlakplaas) ===
Disposal of corpses at Vlakplaas

...[A] shallow grave was dug with bushveld wood and tyres. The two corpses were lifted onto the pyre and as the sun set over the Eastern Transvaal bushveld, two fires were lit, one to burn the bodies to ashes, the other for the security policemen to sit around, drinking and grilling meat.
[Dirk Coetzee explains] 'Well, during the time we were drinking heavily, all of us, always, every day. It was just another job to be done. In the beginning it smells like a meat braai, in the end like the burning of bones. It takes about seven to nine hours to burn the bodies to ashes. We would have our own little braai and just keep on drinking.'

— Pauw, The Heart of Darkness, ch. 11

The operational arm of C-Section was Section C1, sometimes known by the name of its headquarters at Vlakplaas. It was based on a similar counterinsurgency model used successfully by the Selous Scouts in Rhodesia (itself allegedly partly funded by a special account of the Security Branch) and then by Koevoet in South West Africa, which the Security Branch had helped establish. Many of the white officers at C1 were drawn from Koevoet or the SAP Special Task Force, and many had specific counterinsurgency experience or specialised training, such as in explosives.

C1 was responsible for the "rehabilitation" of terrorists: it housed activists who had been "turned" – usually under torture, but sometimes voluntarily – and recruited as police informants, known as askaris. The informants usually returned to their political organisations and infiltrated further into anti-apartheid networks as double agents, gathering intelligence for the Branch. Initially, they were treated as informants and were paid from a secret account; later, they were officially, though covertly, recruited as SAP constables and paid a police salary. Some – most famously Joe Mamasela and Tlhomedi Ephraim Mfalapitsa – defected entirely and became full-time Branch officers. The use of askaris seems to have resulted in considerable tactical successes, but perhaps more significant were the internal divisions it wrought within liberation movements. These divisions are exemplified by the spate of necklacings in the late 1980s and by cases like that of Stompie Seipei, whose throat was cut after he was falsely accused of being a police informant. Allegations and rumours that certain politicians spied for the Security Branch or for other intelligence agencies during apartheid are not uncommon even in post-apartheid South Africa.

Section C1 also housed a notorious paramilitary death squad, which killed dozens of anti-apartheid activists, many of them former informants or people who had refused to become informants. In the late 1990s, Eugene de Kock testified at length about killings and other illegal acts committed by the unit, which he commanded from 1985 to 1993. In 1996 he faced criminal prosecution and was sentenced to 212 years and two life terms, though the TRC granted him amnesty for the several crimes it found to have been politically motivated.

=== C2: Research ===
Section C2, headed in the 1980s by Martin Naudé, identified, monitored and interrogated activists. Its intelligence was often used to capture activists, with an eye to interrogating them and recruiting them to C1 as informants. C2 maintained a so-called "Terrorist Album," a large album of photographs of suspected anti-apartheid activists, which informants were encouraged to peruse.

=== C3: TREWITS ===
What did they think we were collecting all this information about addresses, cars, movement for? To send Christmas cards?

— Former member of TREWITS on its target-identification and operational applications

Also under the command of the C-Section from 1986 and designated Section C3 was the highly secretive Teen Rewolusionêre Inligting Taakspan (Counter-Revolutionary Intelligence Task Team, best known as TREWITS). Though housed within the Branch, TREWITS was a subcommittee of the State Security Council (SSC), and also contained representatives of the National Intelligence Service and of the Military Intelligence and Special Forces branches of the South African Defence Force (SADF). It was formed to coordinate and assess operational information, primarily in reference to liberation movement bases (especially ANC and MK bases) in neighbouring countries. In practice its primary function was target identification. Former Security Branch head and Police Commissioner Johan van der Merwe confirmed that TREWITS existed, but denied that it had evolved to include targets inside South Africa, as claimed by other former Branch officers. It was established in September 1986, moved into its own offices in Pretoria in January 1987, and was disbanded in 1992. Its existence was not public knowledge until the TRC hearings.

== G-Section: Foreign intelligence and Stratcom ==
Under the leadership of Piet Goosen and Craig Williamson, the G-Section of the Security Branch carried out operations outside South Africa, like C-Section with a focus on anti-apartheid activism and thus on South African activists in exile. Section G1 was responsible for foreign intelligence, Section G2 for Strategic Communications, and Section G3 for counterespionage. Its intelligence network in Africa (the "Africa Desk") was based in Malawi and focused on Zambia and Tanzania; in Europe, the network was sometimes based in London and sometimes in Brussels. One of the objectives of the Section was the infiltration of ANC and other anti-apartheid structures abroad – it was revealed at the TRC that an anti-apartheid group in Spain in the 1980s had been set up at Williamson's suggestion, funded by the G-Section, and headed by a Branch agent. Other activities of the Section in foreign countries included:

- The assassinations of Ruth First and Jeanette Schoon;
- The 1982 burglaries of the ANC, PAC, and SWAPO London offices; and
- The 1982 bombing of the ANC's London offices.

=== G2: Stratcom ===
Housed in the G-Section (and in the D-Section after restructuring in the early 1990s) was the Branch's Stratcom unit, so named after the Strategic Communications Branch subcommittee ("Tak Strategiese Kommunikasie," TSK; best known as Stratcom or Stratkom) of the SSC. In January 1985, the SSC through this subcommittee approved a new policy, also commonly referred to as Stratcom, which entailed the intensification and coordination of the intelligence services' disinformation activities. The SSC subcommittee, which included representatives of the National Intelligence Service and SADF Military Intelligence as well as the Security Branch, was reorganised for this purpose, and in subsequent years the Security Branch set up its own dedicated Stratcom unit, which reported to the Minister of Law and Order and to the Stratcom subcommittee of the SSC. From 1989 to 1990, the Branch's Stratcom unit was run by Vic McPherson. Historian Stephen Ellis said of the projects pursued under the Stratcom policy (an assessment that the TRC agreed with):

Although these projects were in theory concerned with the dissemination of information and disinformation, many involved blackmail, libel and manipulation of such a mischievous type that, in situations of acute unrest, they could lead to murder and other bloodshed.

In some cases, measures were taken to perpetuate the myth that a victim who had been killed was still alive… [B]efore being killed by the Northern Transvaal Security Branch in 1986, Patrick Mahlangu was forced to write his family a letter which was then posted in Botswana, thereby creating the illusion that he had gone into exile. His family believed this and eagerly awaited his return in the early 1990s.

— Report of the TRC, vol. 6

Elsewhere, the TRC defined Stratcom as "a form of psychological warfare waged by both conventional and unconventional means." According to former Branch officers, Stratcom had both "hard" and "soft" sides. The "soft" operations involved propaganda and disinformation, and general "dirty tricks," especially harassing and intimidating activists "by damaging their property; constant and obvious surveillance; making threatening phone calls, and firing shots at houses or throwing bricks through windows." These were already fairly routine for the Branch by the 1970s, but later were formalised and coordinated under the Stratcom unit and selected more strategically for political impact. For example, in July 1988, after the government had failed to have Cry Freedom banned – it was a film about the death of Steve Biko in Security Branch custody, and the Cabinet worried it would be "inciteful" – Minister of Justice Adriaan Vlok authorised an operation in which officers placed dummy explosives in cinemas around South Africa, to provide a pretext for seizing and banning the film. Typical Stratcom activities for which officers subjected amnesty applications to the TRC included:

graffiti, fake pamphlets, pouring paint remover over vehicles, disrupting protest gatherings though the use of stink bombs or teargas, theft, threatening phone calls, blackmail, framing, assault, slashing of car tyres, bricks through windows, loosening wheel nuts and bolts of vehicles, firing shots at houses, and arson and petrol bomb attacks on vehicles, homes and buildings.

"Hard" Stratcom involved "active measures," especially so-called contra-mobilisation. At the TRC, Vlok conceded both that Stratcom had been official state policy and that it had been illegal and unlawful. Hard Stratcom, he said, was an artefact of the late-80s shift in national security policy towards stricter internal counterinsurgency measures, necessitated by intensifying internal resistance to apartheid.

== Activities ==
=== Interrogation and torture ===
Most people who told the Commission they had been detained said also that they had been subjected to some form of assault or torture associated with detention… Extreme torture such as electric shocks or suffocation frequently resulted in loss of bladder or bowel control. Detainees found this painfully degrading; they were disgusting to themselves. Some individuals gave in under the duress of torture and gave evidence against their own comrades. Often these detainees would remain silent after they were released because of feelings of intense remorse and guilt and their belief that when their beliefs were tested they were found wanting.

— Report of the TRC, vol. 2

The Security Branch had access to all political detainees in the system, including those arrested by other elements of the security services. In the north of the country, many were detained in Johannesburg at the Gray's Building or, from 1968, at John Vorster Square police station, where the Branch had offices on the top two floors. The lifts in John Vorster Square only went up to the ninth floor, and detainees on their way to interrogation were walked up the staircase from the ninth floor to the tenth floor. The Branch used interrogations not only to extract information from detainees but also with an eye to "turning" them and recruiting them as permanent agents.

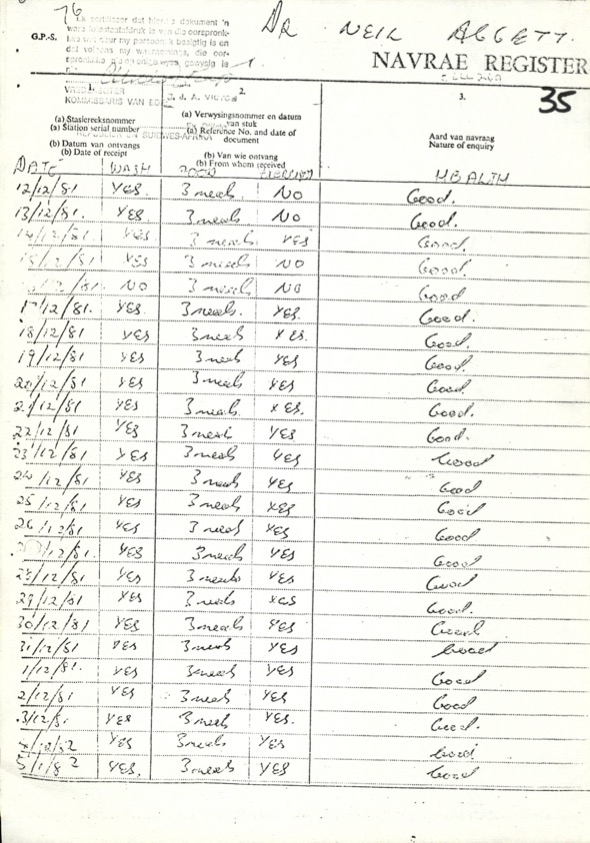
Officers recorded Neil Aggett's health as "good" in the weeks before his death in detention

Allegations that the Branch subjected detainees to torture first surfaced in the early 1960s, and escalated as a series of deaths in custody was reported. The TRC later concluded that all branches, offices, and levels of the Security Branch had used torture "systematically," both as a means of obtaining information and as a means of terror, usually with the knowledge and probably the condonation of senior officers. Effectively permitted by the law to prolong detentions indefinitely, officers frequently interrogated activists for weeks or months at a time, often combining different methods over that period. Methods of torture included prolonged solitary confinement, sleep deprivation, dangling detainees from the window, beatings, and electric shock. Also common were psychological threats and intimidation, especially with interrogators claiming that the detainee's peers had already informed on him. These interrogation methods were also used by units of the Branch stationed in neighbouring countries, especially on SWAPO activists in Owamboland and Oshakati in what was then South West Africa.

In relation to the Security Branch "particularly but not exclusively," the TRC further found that

a considerable number of deaths in detention occurred, either as a direct result of torture or as a consequence of a situation in which the circumstances were such that detainees were induced to commit suicide.

Prominent deaths in custody following detention and interrogation by the Security Branch include those of Neil Aggett, Ahmed Timol, and Steve Biko. In 2017, a second inquest found that Timol had died after members of the Branch pushed him out a window or off the roof at John Vorster Square. The verdict in a second inquest into Aggett's death is currently pending.

=== Surveillance ===
From its establishment, a central mandate of the Security Branch was to investigate and gather intelligence about suspected opponents of the state, both for the purpose of prosecution and for the purpose of guiding and justifying the imposition of banning orders under the Suppression of Communism Act and later legislation. According to the TRC, the justifications it provided were often "flimsy." The Branch intercepted private mail and telephone calls and physically surveilled suspected anti-apartheid activists. For example, Soweto Security Branch officers testified that Winnie Madikizela-Mandela, the wife of Nelson Mandela, had been subject to constant electronic surveillance by phone taps and bugs, and that Jerry Richardson – a member of her Mandela United Football Club, and famously the killer of Stompie Seipei – had been a police informant.

=== Propaganda and disinformation ===
Under Stratcom, the Branch pursued disinformation campaigns to tarnish the credibility of anti-apartheid activists, to sow internal divisions in the anti-apartheid movement (or even provoke internecine violence), and to cover up its own officers' involvement in various crimes. More than once it attempted to frame activists as police informants. Stratcom's activities in relation to media propaganda appear to have grown out of initiatives and networks established by the government in the 1970s and publicly exposed in the 1978 Information Scandal. McPherson, the former head of Stratcom at the Branch, claimed that the Branch nurtured a network of "friendly" journalists, some of whom were paid Branch informants. At the TRC, he announced that he had provided the Commissioners with a confidential list of journalists who had been "friendly" with, sporadically on the payroll of, or regularly on the payroll of the Security Branch. This list might well have been unreliable – the one name McPherson disclosed at the hearing he later withdrew when the journalist in question, Fred Bridgland, strenuously denied the allegation. However, the revelations about Stratcom, and the list of friendly journalists in particular, have occasionally been revivified in post-apartheid South Africa, through accusations that certain individuals were or remain "Stratcom agents."

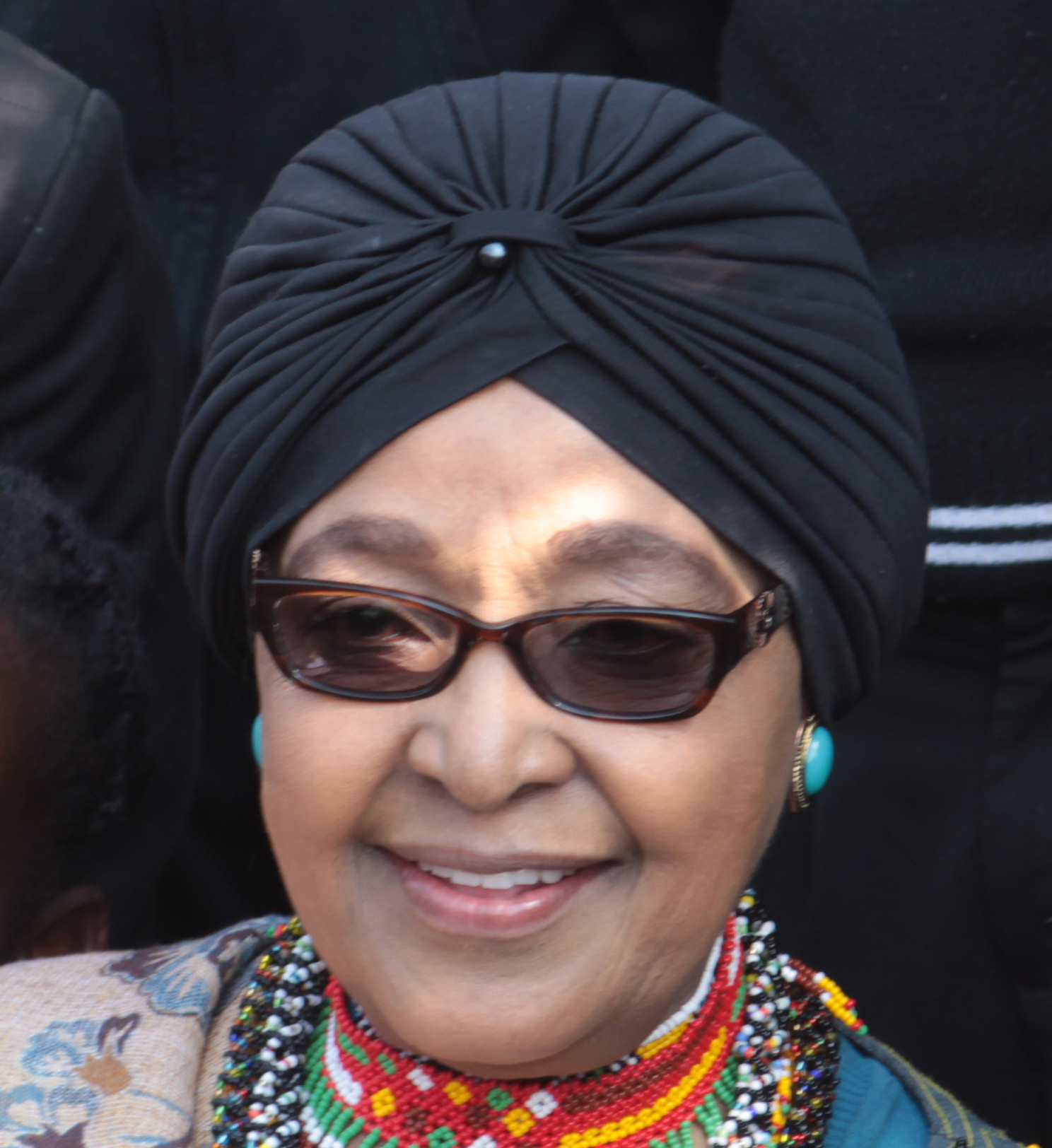
Winnie Madikizela-Mandela was targeted by Stratcom

==== Winnie Madikizela-Mandela ====
Along with Peter Mokaba and Chris Hani, Winnie Madikizela-Mandela was apparently a central target of the Security Branch's "concerted disinformation campaign against the ANC and the South African Communist Party." Officers from different divisions disagreed about whether Madikizela-Mandela had been targeted, but some – among them McPherson and Paul Erasmus – testified to the TRC at some length about attempts to tarnish Madikizela-Mandela's reputation as a means to damaging the credibility of the ANC and of her husband. Under Operation Romulus, the Stratcom unit fed intelligence on Madikizela-Mandela – including about the murder of Stompie Seipei and her alleged affair with Dali Mpofu – to national and international media.

One of the most prominent post-apartheid "Stratcom" scandals occurred in 2018 when a clip of Madikizela-Mandela was released posthumously as promotional material for the documentary Winnie. In the clip, Madikizela-Mandela claims that prominent liberal journalists Anton Harber and Thandeka Gqubule-Mbeki "actually did the job for Stratcom" while working at the Weekly Mail during apartheid. The Weekly Mail was in fact the newspaper which broke the Stratcom story in 1995. When the Economic Freedom Fighters repeated the claim, Harber and Gqubule-Mbeki successfully sued for defamation. The South African National Editors’ Forum has expressed concern about the political exploitation of Stratcom as a means to undermining the media.

=== Sabotage ===
The Security Branch was responsible for the 1987 bombing of COSATU House, the Johannesburg headquarters of the ANC-aligned Congress of South African Trade Unions (COSATU); the 1988 bombing of Khanya House, the Pretoria headquarters of the Southern African Catholic Bishops' Conference; and the 1988 bombings of Khotso House, the Johannesburg headquarters of the South African Council of Churches and United Democratic Front (UDF). The TRC found that the attacks had been "authorised at the highest level." Indeed, Vlok, then the Minister of Justice, testified that he had personally authorised the attacks on COSATU House and Khotso House, in the case of the latter to fulfil State President P. W. Botha's request that the building should be rendered "unusable." The Branch carried out numerous other attacks on buildings housing civil society organisations, political groups, and their leaders, including the 1982 bombing of the ANC's London offices.

=== Extra-judicial killings ===
The Security Branch was responsible for extrajudicial killings, especially of anti-apartheid activists. The TRC concluded that its officers had carried out many political assassinations, "frequently with the authorisation or involvement of senior Security Branch personnel." The Branch carried out some very prominent assassinations, such as those of Griffiths Mxenge, Ruth First, and the Cradock Four. It used gunshots, various kinds of explosives, and, in at least one case – that of Black Consciousness activist Siphiwe Mthimkulu – thallium. In 1989, the Branch also carried out the attempted murder of Frank Chikane, at Vlok's instruction, by lacing his underwear with a nerve agent. Targets were sometimes killed in or abducted from neighbouring countries, especially Swaziland, and were often ambushed based on information obtained from the Branch's informants.

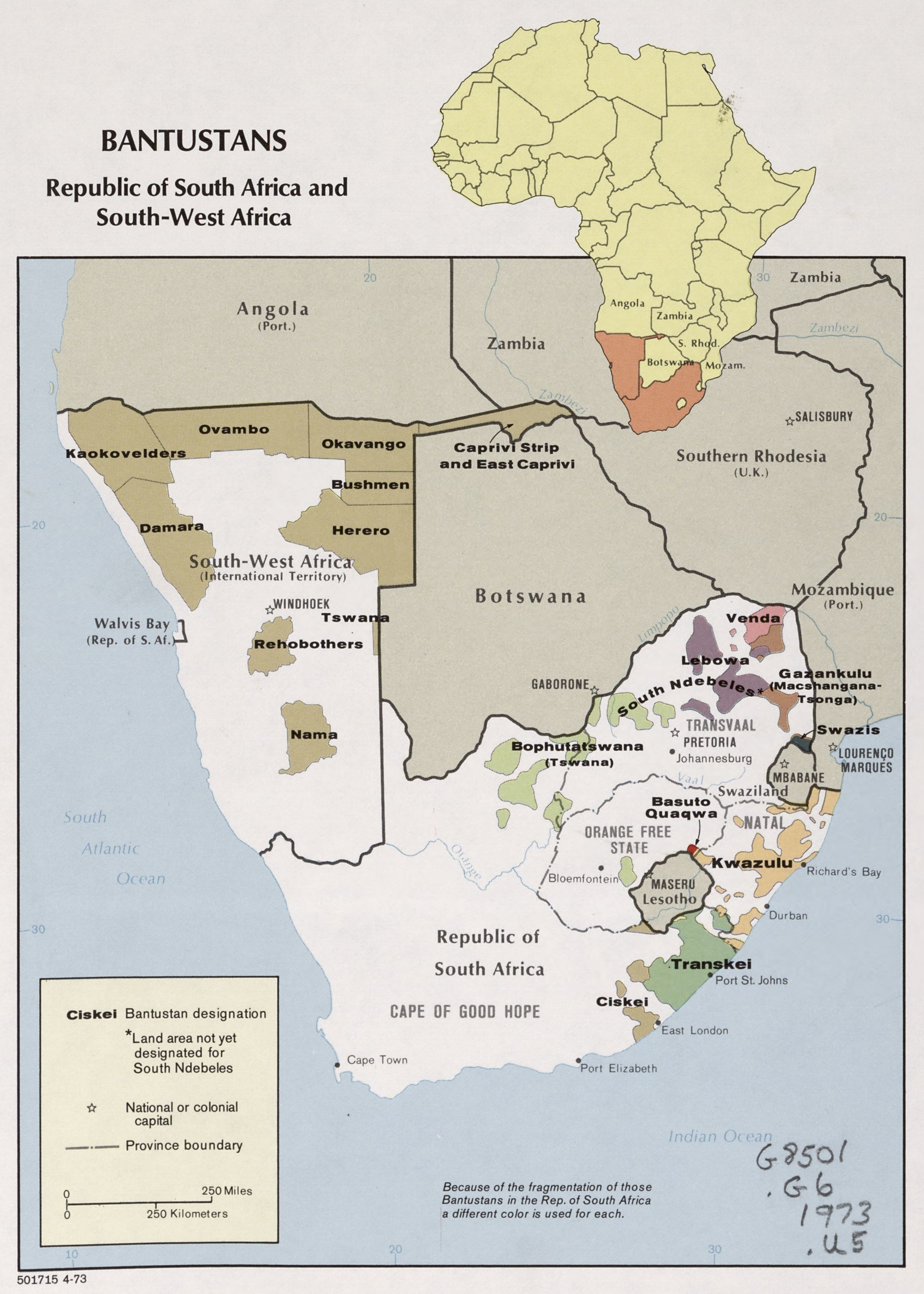
Southern Africa in 1973

=== Koevoet ===
In 1976, during the Border War, the Security Branch launched "Operation K," which evolved by 1979 into what was known as Koevoet ("Crowbar"). Koevet was a counterinsurgency unit in South West Africa, based in Oshakati and Rundu, and undertook both operational and intelligence-gathering activities, primarily against SWAPO and its armed wing. Louis le Grange, then South African Minister of Law and Order, called it "the crowbar which prises terrorists out of the bushveld like nails from rotten wood." It worked very closely with SADF, and on some accounts was a joint operation with SADF, but, in its early years, was formally located under the Security Branch. Its founding commander, Johannes "Hans" Dreyer, was a senior Branch officer; many other personnel were drawn from the Branch; and many of its black members were recruited through Branch networks in Ovamboland. In 1985, the unit was transferred to the South West African Police, and before that it had already attained a degree of autonomy from the SAP (and even from SADF, whose operations it was supposed to be supporting). However, in 1983, a significant number of Branch personnel had been withdrawn from Namibia and transferred from Koevoet to Section C1, the Branch's new internal counterterrorism operations unit, whose organisational culture acquired resemblances to that of Koevoet. Among those transferred from Koevoet was Eugene de Kock, who commanded C1 from 1985.

=== Other cross-border activities ===
Especially during the 1970s and 1980s, the PAC and ANC were highly active in neighbouring active countries, where they were in exile from repression within South Africa and accommodated by sympathetic regimes or opposition parties. The Security Branch was thus involved in several operations outside South Africa. It had a close working relationship with regimes in Swaziland, Malawi, and (after 1986) Lesotho – along with SADF's Military Intelligence division, it set up a joint security task force with representatives of the Basotho police and defence force. In one notable example of Branch activity outside South Africa's borders, the Branch was involved in target identification for the SADF's 1985 raid on Gaborone. Several Branch officers applied for amnesty from the TRC for their roles in gathering intelligence for and planning the raid, and they testified that they had attended planning sessions with SADF as representatives of the Branch's national office and of several of its regional divisions.

=== Contra-mobilisation ===
From the mid-1980s, the SSC grew to emphasise the principle of "contra-mobilisation": counter-propaganda to mobilise popular opposition, especially among "moderate blacks," to the liberation movements, especially the ANC, and to sow and exploit internal divisions within those movements. The state's role in contra-mobilisation necessarily had to be concealed, so it provided covert logistical, political and financial support to what the TRC called "surrogate forces." As early as 1985, the SSC through Stratcom sought to exploit conflict between the ANC-aligned UDF and the Azanian People's Organisation (AZAPO) – a memo was circulated with a list of possible themes that could be used, such in a covert pamphlet campaign, to further entrench divisions between the groups. The state's contra-mobilisation policy eventually escalated to the point that security forces were willing to actively facilitate violent conflict between factions of the anti-apartheid movement. SADF seems to have been the main player in implementing contra-mobilisation efforts along these lines, but the Security Branch was the key channel through which SAP sponsored and participated in any such efforts, and did play a role. For example, one Branch officer claimed that, amid the political violence of the early 1990s, the Alexandra Security Branch routinely attempted to inflame tensions between the ANC and Inkatha in Alexandra, including by driving through the township at night firing guns "randomly" and naming ANC members to Inkatha.

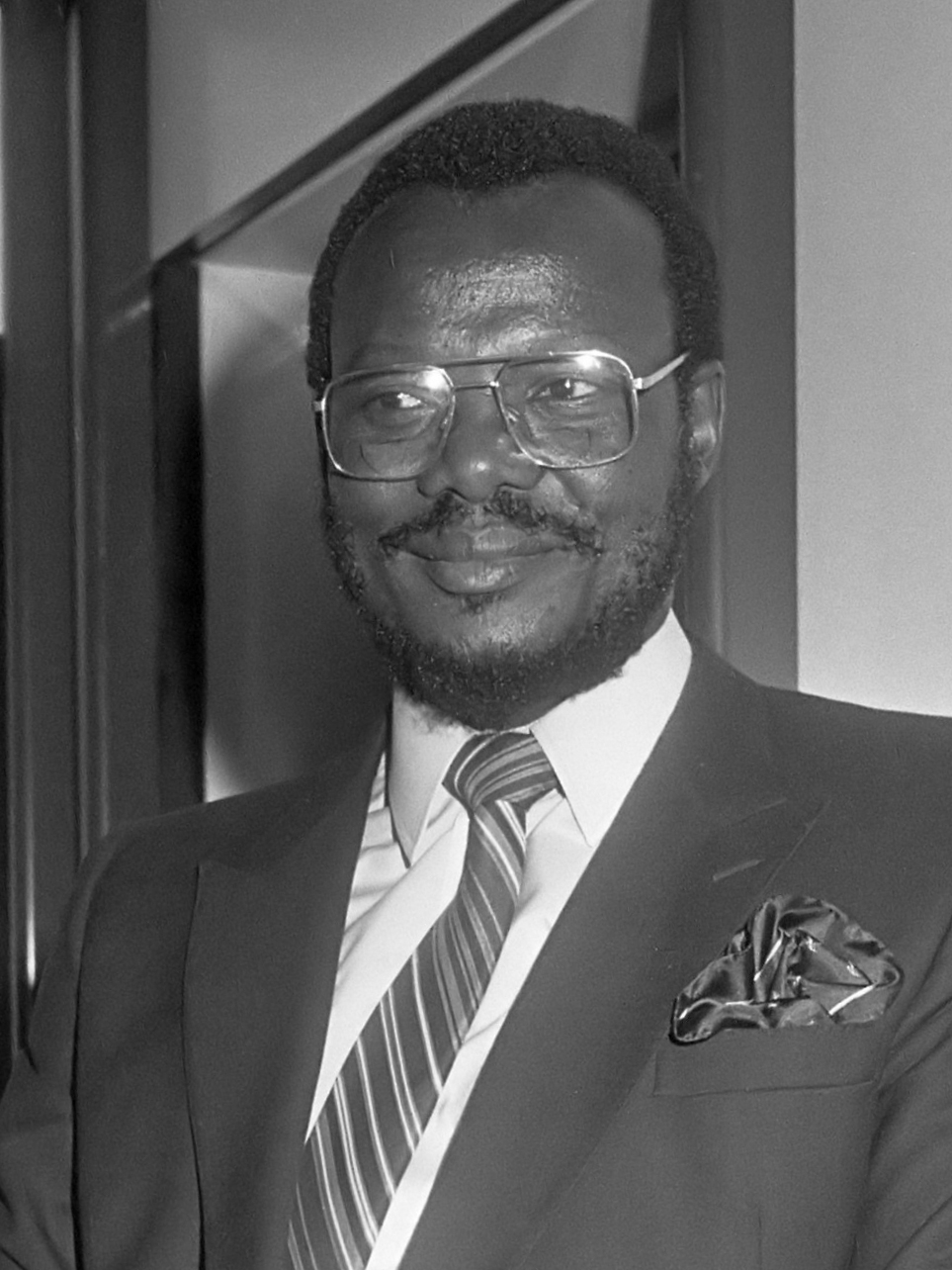
"Inkathagate" concerned Security Branch funding for Mangosuthu Buthelezi's Inkatha

Apart from provoking conflict, the security forces facilitated it by providing support to the groups involved – specifically, the TRC noted, groups opposed to the ANC and its allies, the UDF and Mass Democratic Movement. In the mid-1980s, the Branch collaborated with Reverend Mzwandile Maqina, whose group AmaAfrika was involved in the UDF-AZAPO violence in the Cape, though Maqina was later handed off to Military Intelligence. The Branch also supported Inkatha-aligned vigilantes, such as the A-Team in Durban, from 1985 at the latest. Later, in another example, several members of Section C1 of the Branch admitted to having provided arms for the Ciskei and Transkei coups plotted by SADF under Operation Katzen. The weapons were channelled through a private company which was ostensibly under contract with the anti-ANC Oupa Gqozo but was in fact a SADF front. C1 head Eugene de Kock and others claimed that the provision of arms had been authorised by the commander of the C-Section and by the head of the Branch itself. Indeed, the provision of arms and funds was probably the Branch's biggest contribution the political turmoil of the democratic transition of the early 1990s. As revealed during the Inkathagate scandal, the Branch had materially supported Inkatha-aligned groups since at least 1986, when it provided covert funding for Inkatha's establishment of the United Workers' Union of South Africa as a competitor to the ANC-aligned COSATU. Later, in the early 1990s and by then operating under the CIC, the Branch, especially C1, supplied arms seized in Namibia to Inkatha. Some officers also testified to having provided Inkatha with weapons training.

Some members of the security forces also supported the white right wing with information, arms, and training. However, in the early 1990s, there was also apparently a Stratcom operation, known as Operation Cosmopolitan, under which the Security Branch infiltrated right-wing groups like the Boere Weerstandsbeweging with the aim of persuading them to accept a peaceful democratic settlement.

== Commanding officers ==
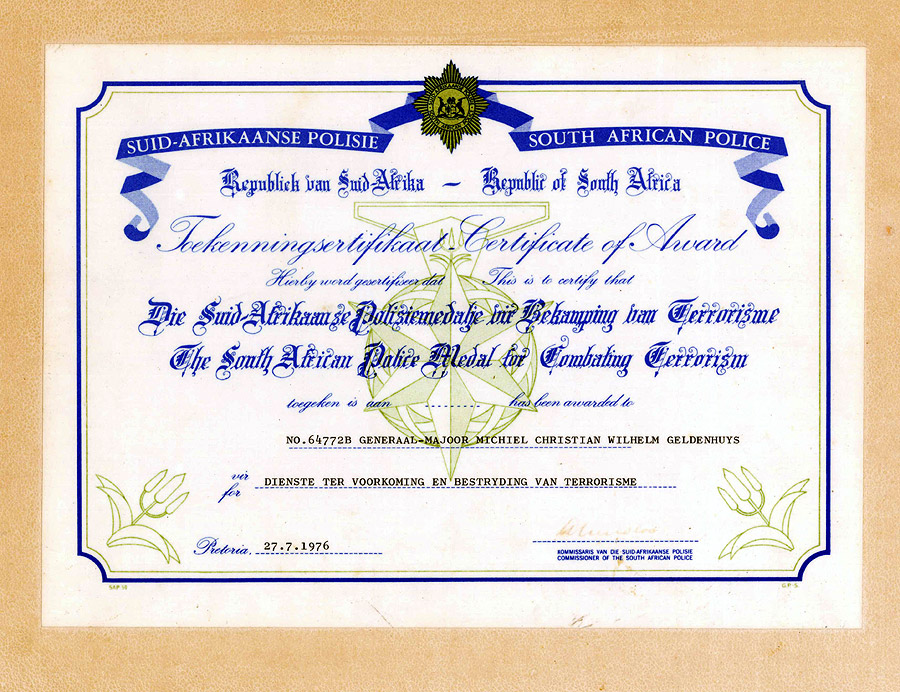
While at the Branch, Gen Mike Geldenhuys received a 1976 SAP Medal for "services toward the prevention and combating of terrorism" ("dienste ter verkooming en bestryding van terrorisme")

Era	Commanding officer	Ref.
1940s	Hendrik Jacobus du Plooy	
1950s	Willem Carl Prinsloo	
1960s	Hendrik van den Bergh	
1960s	P.J. "Tiny" Venter	
1970s	Mike Geldenhuys	
1970s	C.F. Zietsman	
1980s	Johan Coetzee	
1980s	Frans Steenkamp	
1980s	Stanley Schutte	
1980s	Johan van der Merwe	
1990s	Basie Smit	

Du Plooy, Geldenhuys, Coetzee, and van der Merwe all went on to serve as national Commissioner of Police.

== Notable members ==
Several Security Branch agents are household names because they made extensive disclosures in TRC hearings, in criminal trials, or in the press, usually in the mid-to-late 1990s. Others, especially known askaris and those who carried out interrogations of detainees, had attained a reputation among anti-apartheid activists well before then. Well-known former members include:

- Gideon Nieuwoudt
- Craig Williamson
- Eugene de Kock
- Dirk Coetzee
- Paul Erasmus
- Butana Almond Nofomela
- Joe Mamasela
- Charles Sebe
- Harold Snyman
- Olivia Forsyth

== List of killings carried out by the Branch ==
Below is a non-exhaustive list of killings known to have been carried out by the Security Branch. Unless otherwise specified, the Branch's responsibility for the killings listed was established by Security Branch members who confessed their own involvement, especially in amnesty applications to the TRC. The list therefore does not include killings which the Security Branch is merely alleged to have carried out, or even killings which the TRC found the Branch responsible for without receiving corroboration from participants in the act. (Note: Steve Biko is therefore not listed because the officers involved in his death, though they applied and were refused amnesty for their roles, continue to maintain that Biko was injured in a scuffle.) Most recently in the case of the Cradock Four, there has been and remains considerable mystery and contestation around the question of the level at which certain killings were authorised, and whether, for example, the State Security Council sanctioned or ordered them.

Killings known to have been carried out by the Security Branch
Name of victim	Year	Method	Ref
Ahmed Timol	1971	Pushed from window during interrogation (Note: Established in a 2017 inquest.)	
Oupa Ronald Madondo	1980	Shot dead	
Griffiths Mxenge	1981	Stabbed by C1	
Gcinisizwe Kondile	1981	Shot dead	
Isaac Moema	1981	Shot dead	
Peter Dlamini	1981	Shot dead	
Vuyani Mavuso	1981	Shot dead	
Jabulile Nyawose	1982	Killed by a car bomb	
Petros Nyawose	1982	Killed by a car bomb	
Ruth First	1982	Killed by a letter bomb	
Siphiwe Mthimkulu	1982	Abducted and shot dead (known as the Cosas Two)	
Topsy Madaka	1982	Abducted and shot dead (known as the Cosas Two)	
Zandisile Musi	1982	Killed by explosives in an entrapment operation (known as the Cosas Four)	
Fanyana Nhlapo	1982	Killed by explosives in an entrapment operation (known as the Cosas Four)	
Eustice Madikela	1982	Killed by explosives in an entrapment operation (known as the Cosas Four)	
Ntshingo Mataboge	1982	Killed by explosives in an entrapment operation (known as the Cosas Four)	
Jeanette Schoon	1984	Killed by a letter bomb	
Katryn Schoon	1984	Killed by a letter bomb	
Japie Maponya	1985	Abducted and killed by C1	
Batandwa Ndondo	1985	Killed while being abducted or arrested	
Cedric Dladla	1985	Killed by modified mines and hand grenades supplied by an askari in an entrapment operation ("Operation Zero Zero")	
Joseph Mazibuko	1985	Killed by modified mines and hand grenades supplied by an askari in an entrapment operation ("Operation Zero Zero")	
John Mlangeni	1985	Killed by modified mines and hand grenades supplied by an askari in an entrapment operation ("Operation Zero Zero")	
Samuel Lekatsa	1985	Killed by modified mines and hand grenades supplied by an askari in an entrapment operation ("Operation Zero Zero")	
Humphrey Tshabalala	1985	Killed by modified mines and hand grenades supplied by an askari in an entrapment operation ("Operation Zero Zero")	
Johannes Mazibuko	1985	Killed by modified mines and hand grenades supplied by an askari in an entrapment operation ("Operation Zero Zero")	
Hogseo Lengosane	1985	Killed by modified mines and hand grenades supplied by an askari in an entrapment operation ("Operation Zero Zero")	
Qaqawuli Godolozi	1985	Abducted, beaten, and strangled (known as the Pebco Three)	
Champion Galela	1985	Abducted, beaten, and strangled (known as the Pebco Three)	
Sipho Hashe	1985	Abducted, beaten, and strangled (known as the Pebco Three)	
Shadrack Sithole	1986	Ambushed while being transported by Sithole, an askari	
Mobongeni Kone	1986	Ambushed while being transported by Sithole, an askari	
Assen Thimula	1986	Ambushed while being transported by Sithole, an askari	
Mzwandile Hadebe	1986	Ambushed while being transported by Sithole, an askari	
Shadrack Maphumulo	1986	Ambushed while being transported by Sithole, an askari	
Matthew Goniwe	1985	Abducted and shot and/or stabbed (known as the Cradock Four)	
Sparrow Mkhonto	1985	Abducted and shot and/or stabbed (known as the Cradock Four)	
Fort Calata	1985	Abducted and shot and/or stabbed (known as the Cradock Four)	
Sicelo Mhlawuli	1985	Abducted and shot and/or stabbed (known as the Cradock Four)	
Jameson Mngomezulu	1985	Abducted and died during severe torture	
Themba Mlifi	1986	Killed in an entrapment operation (known as the Gugulethu Seven)	
Mandla Mxinwa	1986	Killed in an entrapment operation (known as the Gugulethu Seven)	
Zanisile Mjobo	1986	Killed in an entrapment operation (known as the Gugulethu Seven)	
Zola Swelani	1986	Killed in an entrapment operation (known as the Gugulethu Seven)	
Godfrey Miya	1986	Killed in an entrapment operation (known as the Gugulethu Seven)	
Christopher Piet	1986	Killed in an entrapment operation (known as the Gugulethu Seven)	
Zabonke Konile	1986	Killed in an entrapment operation (known as the Gugulethu Seven)	
Rooibaard Geldenhuys	1986	Drugged and burned in a joint SADF entrapment operation (known as the Nietverdiend or Mamelodi Ten)	
Elliot Sathege	1986	Drugged and burned in a joint SADF entrapment operation (known as the Nietverdiend or Mamelodi Ten)	
Abraham Makolane	1986	Drugged and burned in a joint SADF entrapment operation (known as the Nietverdiend or Mamelodi Ten)	
Samuel Masilela	1986	Drugged and burned in a joint SADF entrapment operation (known as the Nietverdiend or Mamelodi Ten)	
Thomas Phiri	1986	Drugged and burned in a joint SADF entrapment operation (known as the Nietverdiend or Mamelodi Ten)	
Matthews Lerutla	1986	Drugged and burned in a joint SADF entrapment operation (known as the Nietverdiend or Mamelodi Ten)	
Sipho Sibanyoni	1986	Drugged and burned in a joint SADF entrapment operation (known as the Nietverdiend or Mamelodi Ten)	
Morris Nkabinde	1986	Drugged and burned in a joint SADF entrapment operation (known as the Nietverdiend or Mamelodi Ten)	
Jeremiah Ntuli	1986	Drugged and burned in a joint SADF entrapment operation (known as the Nietverdiend or Mamelodi Ten)	
Stephen Makena	1986	Drugged and burned in a joint SADF entrapment operation (known as the Nietverdiend or Mamelodi Ten)	
Jeremiah Magagula	1986	Shot dead in a joint SADF entrapment operation (known as the KwaNdebele Nine)	
Jimmy Mabena	1986	Shot dead in a joint SADF entrapment operation (known as the KwaNdebele Nine)	
Samuel Ledwaba	1986	Shot dead in a joint SADF entrapment operation (known as the KwaNdebele Nine)	
Zakias Skosana	1986	Shot dead in a joint SADF entrapment operation (known as the KwaNdebele Nine)	
Obed Mokhonwana	1986	Shot dead in a joint SADF entrapment operation (known as the KwaNdebele Nine)	
Mabuso Malobala	1986	Shot dead in a joint SADF entrapment operation (known as the KwaNdebele Nine)	
Abram Makulane	1986	Shot dead in a joint SADF entrapment operation (known as the KwaNdebele Nine)	
Ngemane Mafid	1986	Shot dead in a joint SADF entrapment operation (known as the KwaNdebele Nine)	
Jeffrey Hlope	1986	Shot dead in a joint SADF entrapment operation (known as the KwaNdebele Nine)	
Russel Mngomezulu	1986	Shot dead by C1 (known as the Chesterville Four)	
Muntuwenkosi Dlamini	1986	Shot dead by C1 (known as the Chesterville Four)	
Russel Mthembu	1986	Shot dead by C1 (known as the Chesterville Four)	
Sandile Khawula	1986	Shot dead by C1 (known as the Chesterville Four)	
Sipho Stanley Bhila	1987	Shot dead	
Jeffrey Sibiya	1987	Beaten and strangled in an entrapment operation	
"Mpho"	1987	Beaten and strangled in an entrapment operation	
Stanza Bopape	1988	Died during electric shock torture	
Blessing Ninela	1988	Shot dead	
Emmanuel Mzimela	1988	Shot dead	
Phila Portia Ndwandwe	1988	Abducted and shot dead	
Phumezo Nxiweni	1988	Shot dead	
Sibusiso Ndlovu	1988	Shot dead	
Elias Gift Matjale	1988	Shot dead	
Amanzi Vilakazi	1988	Shot dead	
Glen Mgoduka	1989	Killed by a car bomb	
Amos Faku	1989	Killed by a car bomb	
Desmond Mpipa	1989	Killed by a car bomb	
Xolile Sakati	1989	Killed by a car bomb	
Phumelo Moses Nthelang	1989	Suffocated and beaten	
Bheki Mkhwanazi	1989	Shot dead	
Johannes Mabotha	1989 (Note: The date is contested; some Branch officers recall that Mabotha was killed in 1992.)	Shot dead by C1	
Brian Ngqulunga	1990	Shot dead by C1	
Charles Ndaba	1990	Shot dead	
Mbuso Shabalala	1990	Shot dead	
Bheki Mlangeni	1991	Killed by a parcel bomb intended for Dirk Coetzee	
Goodwill Neville Sikhakane	1991	Shot dead	

== See also ==
- Bureau of State Security
- History of South Africa (1994–present)
- Rhodesian Bush War
- Angolan Civil War
- Jimmy Kruger
- Civil Cooperation Bureau
- Tripartite Alliance
- Bisho massacre
- Boipatong massacre
- Arms trafficking
