= Pebco Three =

South African anti-apartheid activists

Sipho Hashe, Champion Galela, and Qaqawuli Godolozi
- Born: South Africa
- Died: 8 May 1985; Port Elizabeth, South Africa
- Cause of death: Strangulation
- Other name: "Pebco Three"
- Occupation: Anti-Apartheid activists
- Known for: Abduction and murder

The Pebco Three were three black South African anti-apartheid activists – Sipho Hashe, Champion Galela, and Qaqawuli Godolozi – who were abducted and subsequently murdered in 1985 by members of the South African security police.

== History of PEBCO ==
After an increase in the cost of living for the Black population in Port Elizabeth – following a 100% rent fee price hike in the late 1970s – the residents of Port Elizabeth decided to organise themselves and form an organisation that would challenge socio-economic injustices that were meted out on Black people including the apartheid regime. On the 10 October 1979, after having officially established the Port Elizabeth Black Civic Organisation (PEBCO), a public meeting was held where it was decided that a protest against the increase in rent, transport, fuel and lighting, township services charges and food costs be held.

PEBCO's immediate aims and demands were: to fight for equal rights for all people of Port Elizabeth; to fight all discriminatory legislation enacted by the government and local authorities; to seek participation in decision making on all matters affecting the people of South Africa; to fight for the granting of the right to Blacks to buy land under freehold title at any place of their choice; and to resist any attempt, direct or indirect, to deprive Blacks of their South African citizenship. Their fundamental aim included the creation of one municipality for the whole of Port Elizabeth, therefore rejecting the system of community councils and separate municipalities for Blacks and Whites.

== The disappearance ==
The 1980s proved to be a volatile period for activism in Port Elizabeth and as such, leaders of PEBCO were detained for short stints from time to time. In 1980, five of its leaders were detained, including Thozamile Botha, the founding member, who in the previous year – 1979 – was dismissed at the Ford Company in New Brighton for his political involvement and organising workers on site. He soon left the country in May 1980 to join the ANC in exile, leaving his comrade Qaqawuli Godolozi as PEBCO's new president. Five years later, on 8 May 1985, three members – Sipho Hashe, Champion Galela, and Qaqawuli Godolozi – disappeared from the airport in Port Elizabeth, South Africa. This was due to the fact that PEBCO had now affiliated itself with the United Democratic Front (UDF), which was believed by some at the time to be an internal wing of the then-banned African National Congress (ANC). As a result of the three's disappearance, the Consumer Boycott Committee organised a huge consumer boycott which began in July 1985. Although it was strongly suspected that the Security Police had something to do with the three activists' disappearance, nothing was known of their fate until November 1997.

== The confession ==
On 11 November, former Security Police Officer Colonel Gideon Nieuwoudt, while applying for amnesty during a Truth and Reconciliation Commission hearing, confessed to participating in the beating, robbery, and murder of the PEBCO Three. According to his testimony, Nieuwoudt lured the three men by having a paid police informant pose as a British embassy official interested in providing a cash donation to PEBCO call Sipho Hashe at his home. The informant convinced Sipho and his two friends to come to the airport to pick up the donation. (Nieuwoudt later refused to name the informant for fear of his safety.) The three men were apprehended by members of the Security Police and taken to an abandoned police station on a farm at Post Chalmers, near Cradock. They were then interrogated, stripped of their possessions, beaten, sedated, and finally strangled. The bodies were burned and the remains were thrown into the nearby Fish River. Eugene de Kock, a former head of section C1 at the Vlakplaas farm north of Pretoria where many of these atrocities occurred – in his submission to the Truth and Reconciliation Commission (TRC) about the death of the PEBCO Three – admits to this and writes that in late 1985 there began an altercation between two members of his Vlakplaas team, sergeant Joe Mamasela and warrant officer Gert Beeslaar who had been involved in an operation in Port Elizabeth in which the PEBCO Three were murdered.

== The court case ==
Also incriminated in the case were former policemen Johan Martin Van Zyl and Johannes Koole. Van Zyl voluntarily surrendered to police in Port Elizabeth on 11 February 2004. He had been out of the country on murder and three counts of assault to do grievous bodily harm. The trial was set for 12 October but has since been postponed by the defence, pending aTruth and Reconciliation Commission review of the 1989 Motherwell Bombing in which Nieuwoudt was also involved. The TRC refused to grant amnesty to the three perpetrators Van Zyl, Nieuwoudt and Lotz, citing that the three had failed to make full disclosure in the case of the PEBCO Three.

== See also ==
- List of solved missing person cases: 1950–1999
- Vlakplaas
