= Butana (name) =

Butana is a South African masculine given name. Notable people with the name include:

- Butana Komphela (1955–2022), South African politician
- Butana Almond Nofomela (born 1957), South African police officer

== See also ==
- Butana, region in Sudan
