= Wedin =

Wedin may refer to:

- Anton Wedin (born 1993), Swedish ice hockey player
- Bertil Wedin (1940–2022), Swedish secret service agent
- Butch Wedin (born 1940), American ski jumper
- Dennis Wedin, Swedish artist
- Elof Wedin (1901–1983), Swedish-American artist
- Viktoria Wedin, Swedish Paralympic sport shooter
