= Student Comrade Prisoner Spy =

2016 book by Bridget Hilton-Barber

- Author: Bridget Hilton-Barber
- Language: English
- Subject: Internal resistance to apartheid; Espionage
- Genre: Autobiography
- Published: Cape Town
- Publisher: Penguin Books
- Publication date: August 2016
- Publication place: South Africa
- Pages: 246
- ISBN: 978-1-77022-800-9 (Paperback)

Student Comrade Prisoner Spy is a 2016 autobiography by South African journalist Bridget Hilton-Barber.

== Background and synopsis ==
The book recounts Hilton-Barber's opposition to apartheid as a young white student at Rhodes University in the Eastern Cape, and the betrayal by her best friend Olivia Forsyth, who was a spy working for the Security Branch of the South African Police. The betrayal led to her imprisonment without trial. Thirty years later Hilton-Barber suffers a flashback which prompts her to journey back to the Eastern Cape to see if she can forgive her betrayer and finally move on from the brutal violence she suffered during the dying days of apartheid.

== Reception ==
In the City Press Sandra Laurence described the book as "chilling, terrifying, hopeful and deeply sad all at once" and a "catalogue of good intentions, commitment and grave risks taken", which made for "...captivating and enjoyable reading". Laurence also praised the "clarity" and "honesty" of the memoir.

The book was also reviewed in the Springs Advertiser
