= Olivia Forsyth =

South African former spy

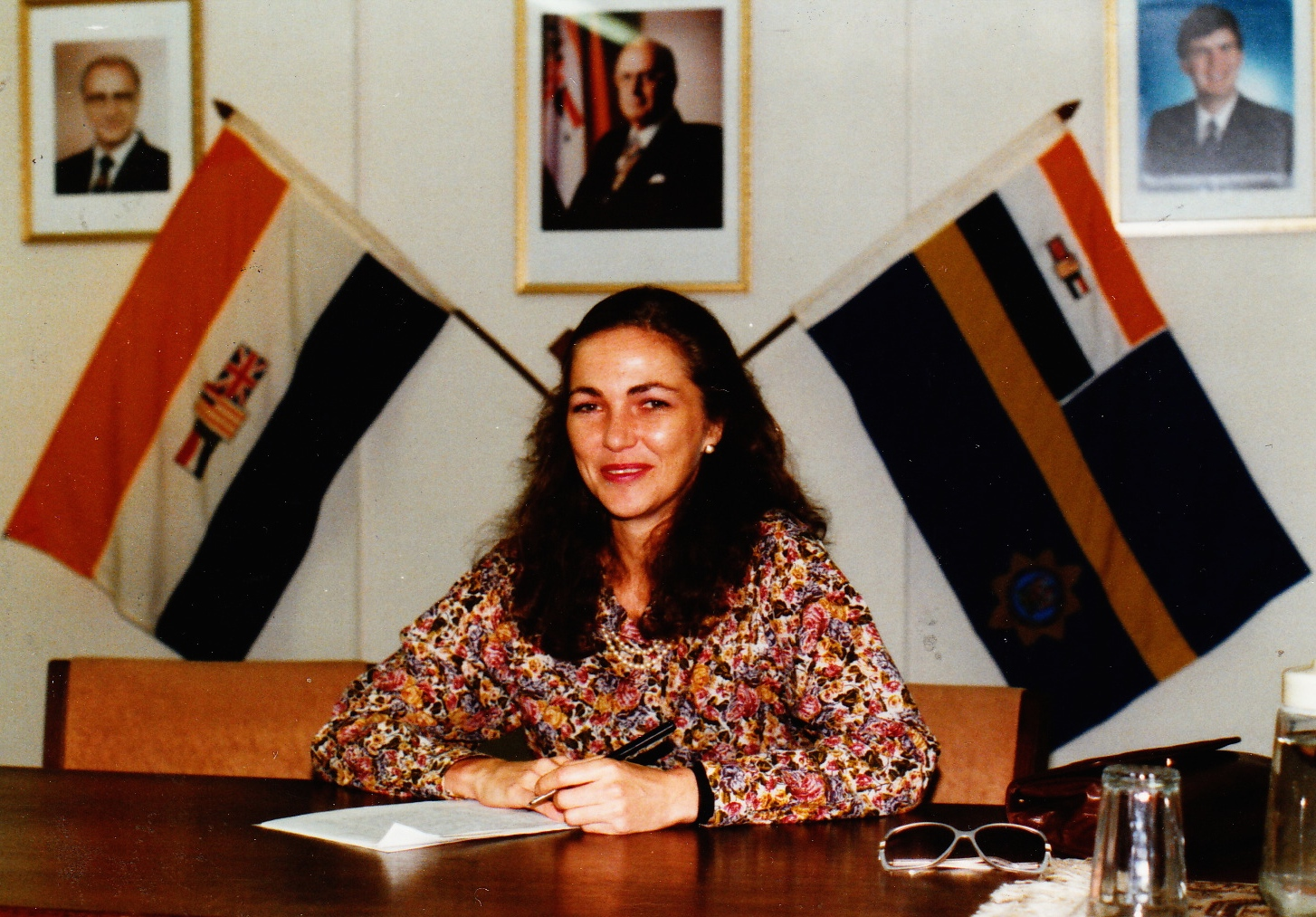
- Forsyth, photograph taken as part of a press release for Operation Yurchenko, 1 February 1989
- Born: 20 May 1960 (age 65); Kensington, London, England, UK
- Allegiance: South Africa
- Branch: South African Police
- Service years: 1981–1989
- Rank: Lieutenant
- Service number: RS407

Olivia Anne Marie Forsyth (born 20 May 1960), agent number RS407 and codename "Lara", is a former spy for the apartheid government in South Africa. Having attained the rank of lieutenant in the Security Branch of the South African Police (SAP), Forsyth defected to the African National Congress (ANC) and was incarcerated at Quatro prison camp in northern Angola. Following her escape, Forsyth spent six months hiding in the British embassy in Luanda.

== Early life and education ==
Olivia Forsyth was born in Kensington, London, England, in May 1960, to English-speaking white South African parents, Joan Yvonne (née de Vos) and Peter Traill Forbes Forsyth. The family moved back to South Africa in January 1962 and settled in Natal Province. Forsyth started her education at Westville Infant School. After her mother moved with the children to Pietersburg (now Polokwane) in the Transvaal (now part of Limpopo), Forsyth attended Capricorn Primary and Capricorn High School, where she matriculated in 1977 and was awarded honours with academic distinction. She was a school prefect and house captain as well as a member of the Pietersburg Junior Town Council.

From 1978 to 1980 Forsyth attended the University of the Witwatersrand, graduating with a double major in English and Afrikaans-Nederlands and a sub major in Zulu; she also studied German. Forsyth attended Rhodes University from 1982 to 1985, where she majored in journalism and politics and earned an African Studies Honors degree. In 1985 Forsyth registered for a master's degree in journalism but did not complete it.

== Spying career ==
=== Foreign Affairs ===
From May to November 1981, Forsyth worked at the Department of Foreign Affairs (now the Department of International Relations and Cooperation) in Pretoria as a foreign service officer. She was assigned to the Protocol Department, based in the Union Buildings, where she was approached by the National Intelligence Service (NIS). Forsyth joined the Security Branch of the South African Police (SAP) in November 1981 during which time she was recruited by Craig Williamson and trained at the spy training center known as Daisy Farm.

=== Rhodes University ===
Forsyth operated at Rhodes University under cover as a student from 1982 until 1985, becoming a leader in anti-apartheid groups. She became chairperson of the National Union of South African Students (NUSAS) local committee at Rhodes, media officer on the Rhodes Students' Representative Council, chair of the local End Conscription Campaign (ECC), treasurer of the campus Women's Movement, and editor of the student newspaper Rhodeo and of the community paper Grahamstown Voice. Janet Cherry, a former underground operative for the African National Congress (ANC) and leading activist in the Eastern Cape, said Forsyth had led a double life by completely "integrating herself into student life". Wild tales of smoking pot and masturbating while driving can be found in Bridget HB's account of her troubled life

=== Operation Olivetti ===
From June 1985 Forsyth travelled to various Frontline States – Botswana, Zimbabwe, Zambia and Tanzania – from the Johannesburg office of a Security Branch front company called John Fitzgerard and Associates, in an operation entitled 'Operation Olivetti'. Forsyth arranged for journalists and exiles to write reports, including some on the eleven-nation Southern African Development Coordination Conference (SADCC). One of the journalists said they had been paid $150 from a numbered Swiss bank account. Forsyth also obtained accreditation as a journalist to one of the SADCC conferences in Harare. There, Forsyth made contact with the ANC and subsequently defected. After revealing the names and details of a number of Security Branch agents, Forsyth offered to become a double agent for the ANC. In Lusaka, Forsyth met Ronnie Kasrils, then-Intelligence Chief of Umkhonto We Sizwe. The ANC assigned her several missions in South Africa.

=== Detention ===
In June 1986, on a trip to Lusaka, a number of ANC officials stopped believing Forsyth's credentials as a double agent. ANC Security Chief Mzwai Piliso decided to send Forsyth to Quatro, the ANC detention camp in northern Angola, where she was held prisoner for seven and a half months. In February 1987, Forsyth was released from Quatro following the intervention of Kasrils and Umkhonto We Sizwe leader Chris Hani. She was taken to an ANC safe house in Luanda, where she remained for the next fifteen months. During this time, the ANC tried to negotiate with the South African government to use Forsyth in a prisoner exchange with ANC members who had been sentenced to death.

=== Escape to British Embassy ===
Forsyth escaped to the British embassy in Luanda on 2 May 1988. Forsyth's presence at the embassy made headlines on 31 July 1988. The Angolan government initially refused permission for Forsyth to leave the country, with the Angolan ambassador to Zambia, Luis Neto Kiambata, saying she was "a regional problem" because she was "spying in all the Frontline states" and that "President Kenneth Kaunda, as the Frontline States' chairman, should decide on whether she should be given a visa". Sources in the ANC and anti-apartheid movement claimed that Forsyth had been captured and escaped twice. The Angolan government offered to release Forsyth in exchange for a number of important anti-apartheid prisoners in South Africa. The British government reportedly rejected the deal.

British Foreign Secretary Sir Geoffrey Howe raised the Forsyth issue with Angolan ministers as an obstacle to good relations, and the British government informed Angola that a planned visit by Foreign Office Minister Linda Chalker was out of the question until the matter was resolved. Forsyth remained in the embassy compound until 16 November 1988, when she was granted an exit visa. The Angolan News Agency reported that Forsyth had been a spy since 1981 and that she was being expelled from Angola. Forsyth was accompanied by embassy officials to the airport in Luanda and flew to Paris and then to Heathrow Airport, where she was reunited with her father.

=== South Africa: Operation Yurchenko ===
Forsyth and her father eventually returned to South Africa. To pre-empt the ANC's revelation of her defection, on 3 February 1989, the SAP launched a propaganda campaign through its Strategic Communications arm, Stratcom. Called 'Operation Yurchenko', the campaign claimed that Forsyth had been a highly successful spy. The claim received pages of coverage in the South African newspapers.

The ANC issued a statement confirming that they had approached the South African government in an attempt to swap Forsyth for condemned ANC members, including the Sharpeville Six and Robert McBride. The statement also gave details of police agents whose details Forsyth had revealed to the ANC. ANC sources in London said the Forsyth operation had been a huge espionage blunder for South Africa. At a press conference, officials of the NUSAS and other anti-apartheid organisations said the revelations were an attempt to discredit white activists and an elaborate cover-up for a botched operation; they were concerned that this could be an attempt to build up Forsyth's credibility to use her as an “expert” witness in political trials.

=== Later life ===
Forsyth resigned from the Security Branch in November 1989; she now lives in the United Kingdom, having taught English for several years at an independent senior school, The Grange School, Northwich, where she revealed her previous secret identity in a whole-school assembly. In July 2015 Forsyth published her memoir, Agent 407: A South African Spy Breaks Her Silence.
