= Barry Roux =

South African lawyer

- Born: 21 November 1955 (age 70); Mahikeng, South Africa
- Occupation: Defence advocate B Juris LLB
- Known for: Trial of Oscar Pistorius

Barry Roux SC (born 21 November 1955) is a South African lawyer who was admitted to the bar in 1982. His practice covers criminal, insurance, delictual, aviation, matrimonial, medical negligence, general contractual and liquidation work. He served as the defence advocate in the trial of Oscar Pistorius.

He is also well known for his use of the phrase "I put it to you..."

== Career ==
Roux was born in Mahikeng, South Africa to parents who were farmers. He attended Rooigrond Primary School and Lichtenburg High School. He studied at the University of South Africa (UNISA) and obtained a B Juris LLB in 1981. Roux once told an interviewer, "I studied law at Unisa. Do you think I studied at Unisa because I wanted to?" in reference to the fact that his family was too poor to afford for him to attend a prestigious law school.

Roux was a state prosecutor from 1973 to 1982 and lectured at Justice College, the South African government's training institution for law officials. "I earned my first money after Matric at the Department of Justice. It’s only then that I opened my first bank account," Roux said in an interview.

He was admitted into the Pretoria Bar in 1982. Amongst the people he has acted on behalf of are Dave King and Roger Kebble (father of Brett Kebble) on separate, unrelated charges of tax fraud.

In the 1990s he also successfully acted on behalf of Lothar Neethling, an apartheid-era police chief, who sued newspapers (including the Vrye Weekblad) for damages over claims that he supplied a toxin to be used on anti-apartheid activists.

Roux defended dentist Casper Greeff, who was convicted in 2001 of murdering his wife.

== Personal life ==
Barry Roux gained an international reputation for being a fearsome cross-examiner and a person unswayed by empathy. However, advocate Manny Witz from the Johannesburg Bar, who worked with Roux for more than 35 years, refers to him as a "very experienced criminal lawyer, and quite a likeable fellow. He is very, very professional, and very competent."

Roux has also been described as "a hardworking but private person." Roux commented in an interview, "I own a holiday house. It’s not a good investment, but it’s wonderful."

Roux's interest are walking, going to the gym and running. He is married to Audrey Botha and they have two children.

== Media ==
Roux's style of cross-examination has led to many parodies including:

- The ‘Barry Roux Rap’ on YouTube
- The song Because I'm Barry by Brad O’Regan
- A fake Twitter account: @BarryRouxLaw
- The Michelle Burger: Extra Grilled fake advertising campaign for Nando's South Africa, referring to his intense cross-examination of the first witness in the Oscar Pistorius trial resulting in her crying.

Among his phrases used in the Pistorius trial that have been parodied are:

- What if I put it to you that my dog barks like a cat?
- Who puts a fan on a balcony?
- Are you fine or are you ok?

== See also ==
- Trial of Oscar Pistorius
- Law of South Africa
- Reeva Steenkamp
