= Bertil Wedin =

Swedish former secret service agent (1940–2022)

- Born: 21 November 1940
- Died: 4 March 2022 (aged 81)
- Occupation: Swedish secret service agent

Bertil Wedin (21 November 1940 – 4 March 2022) was a Swedish secret service agent. He was accused in an English court, but acquitted of the 1982 burglary of the Pan Africanist Congress (PAC) office in London. In 1996, Wedin was named as a suspect in the assassination of Sweden's prime minister, Olof Palme, but has denied any involvement. His accuser, Peter Caselton – who with eight others including Craig Williamson had applied for amnesty from South Africa's Truth and Reconciliation Commission for the March 1982 bombing of the ANC office in London – was allegedly a member of an apartheid South Africa assassination squad. He was also suspected of bombing the ANC Stockholm office in 1986. Wedin denies involvement in any crimes.

Wedin had been a resident of Kyrenia in Northern Cyprus.

Wedin died on 4 March 2022, at the age of 81.
