= Dirk Coetzee =

South African police officer and whistleblower (1945–2013)

Dirk Coetzee (15 April 1945 – 7 March 2013) was co-founder and commander of the covert South African Security Police unit based at Vlakplaas. He and his colleagues were involved in a number of extrajudicial killings including that of Griffiths Mxenge. Coetzee publicly revealed the existence of the Vlakplaas death squads in 1989, making himself a target of a failed assassination attempt.

== Early life ==
Coetzee was born in April 1945 in Phokwane Local Municipality. His father was a postal worker. Coetzee matriculated in 1963 and joined the South African Postal Service in January 1964. In July 1966, he volunteered for military service with the navy until March 1967, then resumed his employment with the postal service until April 1970.

== Career ==
He joined the South African Police Service on 1 April 1970 and was nominated the best student for that year. In November 1973, he received counter-insurgency training and was then sent to Rhodesia as part of a South African Police contingent during the Rhodesian Bush War. Back in South Africa in 1975, he was promoted to lieutenant and stationed at Sibasa. In 1976, he briefly lectured at the police training college before being posted to Volksrust and the border post commander at Oshoek at the Swaziland border. From December 1979 until July 1980, he was promoted to Branch Commander of the Security Police in Middelburg. Coetzee was promoted again, becoming the Commanding Officer of Section C, at Vlakplaas, a secret security police farm near Pretoria on 1 August 1980. In 1981, he was "assigned" to the murder of Griffiths Mxenge.

His role as Vlakplaas commander ended after 18 months, following a disaster when two of his operatives were arrested on a sortie in Swaziland. He was replaced at Vlakplaas by Eugene de Kock, who was later convicted of attempting to assassinate Coetzee.

== After Vlakplaas ==
He was transferred to the Narcotics Bureau in 1982 serving there until 1984. During this time, an internal disciplinary inquiry found him guilty of insubordination, obscene phone calls and distribution of a pornographic video. In 1986, he was found medically unfit to serve because of diabetes, and was discharged on a meagre pension.

Jacques Pauw and Martin Welz of the Rapport newspaper first met Dirk Coetzee in late 1984. Coetzee had just been suspended by the police service after compiling a report about security police phone tapping and had given it to leader of the opposition Frederik van Zyl Slabbert. Coetzee explained to the reporters that his phone was tapped and proceed to speak down the phone line spilling the secrets of his adulterous colleagues to those listening in. Later meetings he would describe to the journalists the security police's murders and assassinations of anti-apartheid activists. The two journalist kept Coetzee's confessions secret as there was no prospect of their pro-government newspaper publishing the allegations.

In 1989, Pauw, now working for the independent Vrye Weekblad met Coetzee again and this time discussed he his own involvement as well as those of the security police in murders such as Griffiths Mxenge, Ruth First, the Marius Schoon family murders and many other incidents. He would only allow his allegations to be published if he and his family were safely out the country. Andre Zaaiman of IDASA, was contacted by Pauw and used his organisation contacts to make an appeal to the ANC for help to break the story to the world.

As these negotiations were continuing, Coetzee realised he was in danger of becoming a scapegoat when the Weekly Mail broke a story in October 1989 concerning an ex-member of Coetzee's Unit C death squad. It told the story of Butana Almond Nofomela, on death-row for a killing a farmer unrelated to his security work and felt betrayed that his appeal for clemency to his former security colleagues had not worked and was due to be hanged. He confessed his security police crimes in an affidavit and named Coetzee.

Justice Minister Kobie Coetzee appointed a Commission of Inquiry under Justice Tim McNally to investigate the allegations. Ex-police colleagues of Dirk Coetzee told him to deny all allegations made by Nofemela.

The ANC Department of Intelligence and Security's Intelligence Chief Jacob Zuma, agreed to take Coetzee into safe keeping outside the country. Coetzee, not wanting to go alone persuaded a former colleague David Tshikalange to go along. The ANC funded the trip though their requirements changed. Coetzee would fly to Mauritius first, completing the newspapers interviews and then fly to London to the ANC while Tshikalange would be interviewed in Zimbabwe. Despite second thoughts, and only his brother Ben aware of his plans, he left his family behind and went to Mauritius on 4 November 1989 and arrived in London on 10 November 1989 and met Zuma and members of uMkhonto we Sizwe the following day. Vrye Weekblad broke the story in South Africa on 17 November 1989, after the Weekly Mail got wind that Coetzee had fled the country and ensured that international correspondents had the story in case the newspaper was banned.

After exposing the existence of the unit, he went on the run, staying in 38 houses in four countries – including a short while in London. While there, he joined the African National Congress (ANC) and expressed his support for Nelson Mandela.

== Return to South Africa ==
Coetzee was minded by the future president Jacob Zuma. He returned to South Africa in 1993. He was among the first to apply for amnesty with the Truth and Reconciliation Commission (TRC) when it was created and was granted amnesty on 4 August 1997. He later fell out of grace with the ANC.

== Later life and death ==
Coetzee was employed by EduSolutions, which supplied textbooks on behalf of the government to Limpopo province. In July 2012, he told the media about huge piles of undelivered textbooks. Coetzee was suffering from kidney failure and cancer when he died on 7 March 2013, aged 67.

== See also ==
- Wouter Basson
- Lothar Neethling
