= Max du Preez =

South African author

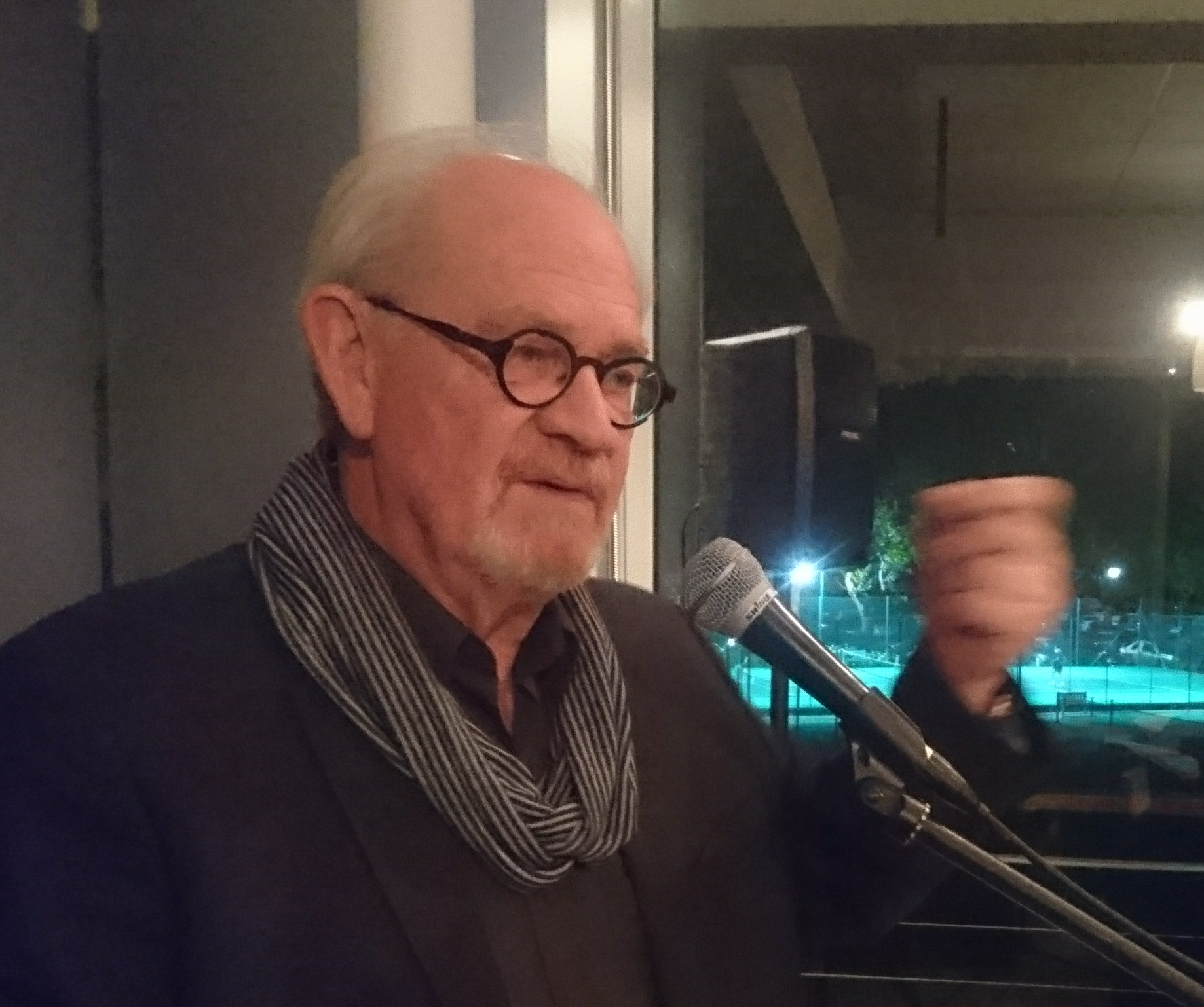
- Du Preez delivering the Barry Streek Memorial Lecture in Cape Town in 2017
- Born: 1951; Kroonstad, Orange Free State, South Africa
- Occupations: Journalist; Anti-apartheid activist; Writer; Documentary filmmaker

Max du Preez (born 1951) is a South African journalist and author. He is known as the founding editor of Vrye Weekblad (1988–1994), and Vrye Weekblad Online or Vrye Weekblad II (2019–2025), and for opposing apartheid. He was also editor and executive producer of a series of television documentaries about the Truth and Reconciliation Commission at the end of the apartheid era.

== Early life and education ==
Max Du Preez was born in Kroonstad, Orange Free State, South Africa, in 1951, into a "conservative middle-class Afrikaner family", with seven siblings. Both grandfathers were Boer soldiers in the Anglo-Boer war, and Du Preez is descended from Paul Kruger, president of the Transvaal Republic. His ancestors are 17th-century Dutch, French, and German settlers who settled in the Cape and eventually occupied the whole country. His father, who came from a poor family and was an Afrikaner nationalist, supporter of apartheid, and a member of the Broederbond, yet had a strong sense of justice. He was castigated by members of his church for greeting the Black minister (of the separate Black church) at his front door and inviting him in for tea, and was kind to Black people in the street.

In the late 1960s to early 1970s, Du Preez attended Stellenbosch University in the Western Cape, rather than the more conservative University of the Orange Free State in Bloemfontein, where the rest of his siblings went. He graduated in political science in 1973.

== Career ==
Du Preez first worked for Die Burger in Cape Town. Starting out as a reporter, he became the youngest person to be sent to the parliamentary press gallery of the (white) Parliament of South Africa, but was astonished to find that his reporting on what ministers said had to be approved by the minister before publication. He joined the inaugural editorial staff of Beeld in 1974. However, he found it increasingly difficult to work for an Afrikaans newspaper group supporting the apartheid government, and in 1983 moved to the Financial Mail as a political reporter.

He was then appointed political correspondent of The Sunday Times and Business Day. In 1987 he was a member of Frederik van Zyl Slabbert's that travelled to Dakar, Senegal, to hold talks with the ANC's leaders in exile.

He became involved with the United Democratic Front, an umbrella organisation comprising many anti-apartheid groups, including trade unions and church groups.

=== Vrye Weekblad ===
Du Preez founded the Vrye Weekblad, a liberal Afrikaans-language weekly newspaper, in November 1988. Du Preez was an opponent of apartheid, and exposed stories of the regime's death squads in the publication, which was the first Afrikaans newspaper to openly criticise the government.

During his tenure as editor-in-chief, the newspaper's offices were bombed by the Civil Cooperation Bureau (a government death squad) and Du Preez received death threats as a result of the paper's opposition to apartheid. The government also squeezed the publication financially, in an effort to close it down.

In 1990 Du Preez was sentenced to six months in jail for quoting Joe Slovo, the then leader of the South African Communist Party and a banned person. In 1994, the publication had to close its doors.

Vrye Weekblad Online, or Vrye Weekblad II, was launched on 5 April 2019. again with Max du Preez as editor, and owned by Arena Holdings. After running into financial difficulties, US-based Afrikaans financier Andre Pienaar took over in late 2022, creating the Nuwe Vrye Weekblad Media Group (NVWB). Du Preez retained a 49% stake and continued as editor-in-chief of Vrye Weekblad. However the flagship publication closed down in March 2025, not being able to maintain a large enough subscriber base. In early 2026, NVWB launched an Afrikaans online platform for business journalism.

=== SABC ===
Du Preez joined the SABC in 1994, as a documentary filmmaker and anchor, during which time it was transformed from a state to a public broadcaster. He was editor and executive producer of 90 documentary programmes on the Truth and Reconciliation Commission process, called the TRC Special Report, which became the most watched documentary series ever on South African television.

In 1999, he was dismissed by the SABC from his position as the executive editor of Special Assignment, an investigative television show, after he objected when a documentary was barred from being shown. Though initially it was simply stated that his contract would not be renewed, the SABC later said he had been dismissed for gross insubordination. Du Preez later said that the programme had "just became a little bit too independent for the new apparatchiks at the SABC, and my contract was ended with a week's notice in mid-1998".

The decision led to a public campaign to call for his reinstatement and the handling by the SABC led to complaints to the Broadcasting Complaints Commission of South Africa. The incident was seen as symptomatic of a public broadcaster voluntarily transforming itself into a state propaganda apparatus.

=== Mbeki criticism ===
In 2001, rumours that the President of South Africa Thabo Mbeki was a philanderer were brought to light by comments Du Preez made in a radio interview on an SABC programme on 8 April 2001. Du Preez, in a discussion about a letter written by ANC Women's League president Winnie Madikizela-Mandela to Jacob Zuma, denying that she had accused Mbeki of womanising, said: "This issue has been discussed, it is the hot topic of gossip in black high society, the political elite, journalists know about it, his whole security establishment know and talk about it and is concerned about it. Should we again be a little group of elite who knows this side of our president like happened in the past?" (referring to the apartheid-era cabinet). His comments were reported on the front page of The Citizen, leading to multiple complaints and an apology by the newspaper. The ANC called Du Preez a racist, a "commissar for apartheid", and declared "war" on him.

== Books ==
Du Preez is the author of many non-fiction books, including a memoir, Pale Native: Memories of a Renegade Reporter, in 2004.

His A Rumour of Spring – South Africa After Twenty Years of Democracy, was published in 2013.

His new book, The End of Normal, due to be published in May 2026, examines "how otherwise decent people came to implement and support an evil system like apartheid", the impact of the 1976 Soweto uprising, and continuing attitudes tensions in South African society, in particular the rise of a new Afrikaner nationalism.

== Other activities ==
Du Preez continues to write columns and op-eds for South African as well as British and European publications on occasion. In April 2025, he wrote an op-ed in The Guardian condemning US President Donald Trump's policy of admitting White South Africans as refugees.

He is also a public speaker, as a political analyst.

== Awards and honours ==
Du Preez is the recipient of a Master of Social Sciences Award from the University of Cape Town, as well as honorary doctorates from Stellenbosch and the Free State Universities.

Other awards include:

- ?: Pringle Prize, National Union of Journalists (UK and Ireland)
- ?: Ahmed Kathrada Award (by Congress of Business and Economics)
- 1991: Louis M. Lyons Award for conscience and integrity in journalism, awarded by the Nieman Foundation for Journalism at Harvard University
- 1996: Excellence in Journalism award from the Foreign Correspondents' Association of Southern Africa
- 2006: Yale Globalist International Journalist of the Year
- 2008: Nat Nakasa Award for Media Integrity for fearless reporting, from the SA National Editors' Forum
- 2004: Runner-up, Alan Paton Award, for Pale Native
- 2014: Winner, Alan Paton Award, for A Rumour of Spring: South Africa after 20 Years of Democracy

== Personal life ==
Du Preez was married, but divorced not long afterwards. He has two children.

== Selected works ==
- Louis Luyt: Unauthorised. Cape Town: Zebra press. 2001. ISBN 978-186872371-3. (about Louis Luyt)
- Pale native: memories of a renegade reporter. Cape Town: Zebra press. 2008 [2003]. ISBN 978-1-86872-913-5.
- Of Tricksters, Tyrants and Turncoats. Cape Town: Struik Publishers. 2008. ISBN 978-1-77022-043-0.
- Oranje, Blanje, Blues: 'n Nostalgiese Trip. Cape Town: Zebra Press. 2005. ISBN 978-1-77007-119-3.
- Of Warriors, Lovers, and Prophets: Unusual Stories from South Africa's Past. Cape Town: Struik Publishers. 2004. ISBN 978-1-86872-901-2.
- The world according to Malema. Cape Town: Kwela Books. 2009. ISBN 978-0-79570-292-1. (about Julius Malema)
- Dwars: mymeringe van 'n gebleikte Afrikaan. Cape Town: Zebra Press. 2010. ASIN B004WJ4SNU.
- The Rough Guide to Nelson Mandela. London: Rough Guides. 2011. ISBN 978-140538236-6.
- A Rumour of Spring: South Africa After 20 Years of Democracy. Cape Town: Struik Publishers. 2013. ISBN 978-1-77022-543-5.
- Of Renegades, Romantics and Rabble-Rousers: More Untold Stories from Southern Africa's Past. Cape Town: Struik Publishers. 2015. ISBN 978-1-77022-159-8.
- The End of Normal. May 2026. ISBN 9781776195558.
