= Craig Williamson =

Anglo-South African pro-apartheid state-sponsored terrorist

- Born: 23 April 1949 (age 77); Johannesburg, South Africa
- Military career
- Allegiance: South Africa
- Branch: Security Branch
- Service years: 1971 – 1992

Craig Michael Williamson (born 23 April 1949), is an English-speaking white former officer in the South African Police, who was exposed as a spy and assassin for the Security Branch in 1980. Williamson was involved in a series of events involving state-sponsored terrorism. This included overseas bombings, burglaries, kidnappings, assassinations and propaganda during the apartheid era.

== Early life ==
Craig Michael Williamson was born on 23 April 1949.

He matriculated from private school, St John's College in Johannesburg, South Africa in 1967.

== Career ==
=== Recruitment ===
Williamson joined the South African Police in 1968. Based at the Parkview police station, he became a sergeant. He was recruited by the intelligence arm of the police, known as the Security Branch, in 1971.

=== Universities ===
Under instruction from his superiors, he enrolled at University of the Witwatersrand in 1972 in order to report on student activities, got himself elected to the students' representative council and, in 1974 became a member of the SRC executive. He then moved to Cape Town as national finance officer of the National Union of South African Students (NUSAS) at the University of Cape Town, and was elected vice-president in 1975.

=== Activities ===
==== Infiltration ====
In 1976, Williamson "fled" the country (pretending to be a dissident) for Botswana, where he met the head of the International University Exchange Fund (IUEF), Lars-Gunnar Eriksson, and persuaded him to employ him as deputy director to help awarding IUEF scholarships to African students. He was thus able to infiltrate the banned African National Congress (ANC) and, at the same time, make high-level contacts in Sweden which provided most of the funding for the IUEF. Williamson's networking through prime minister Olof Palme's office in Stockholm put him in touch with a number of Palme's close associates, including Pan Am Flight 103 victim Bernt Carlsson, who had become secretary-general of the Socialist International in 1976 and was based in London until 1983.

The ANC debriefed Williamson in 1977. He then took up his position in Geneva in 1977, and, via the ANC, secretly channelled funds to anti-apartheid organisations in Southern Africa through various agents, who included his sister. Using IUEF funds, he infiltrated the South African News Agency to recruit and use journalists for apartheid South African counter-intelligence purposes. He also attempted to infiltrate the International Defence and Aid Fund, but was successfully deflected by general secretary Phyllis Altman. Eventually, by 1979, financial problems hit the IUEF, and Williamson tried to blackmail Erikson to prevent his exposure as a spy. However, Arthur McGiven, journalist at The Guardian and Observer, unmasked him in 1980.

Williamson returned to South Africa, where he continued to work for the Security Branch

==== PAC office in London ====
In 1982, a burglary took place at the Pan Africanist Congress office in London. Two suspects were arrested. One of them, a Swedish journalist, Bertil Wedin, was eventually acquitted by an English court. Wedin admitted, however, that he was working for South African intelligence and that he had been recruited by Craig Williamson. The other suspect, South African Defence Force Sergeant Joseph Klue had diplomatic immunity as a member of staff at the South African embassy in London and was ordered to leave the United Kingdom.

==== ANC office in London ====
Williamson applied for amnesty in 1995 from South Africa's Truth and Reconciliation Commission (TRC) for bombing the London office of the ANC in March 1982. In the British House of Commons in June 1995, Peter Hain MP asked through the then Home Secretary, Michael Howard, that the British police should interview and consider extraditing Williamson to stand trial for the London bombing. The Home Secretary turned down Hain's request. Amnesty was eventually granted by the TRC to Williamson and seven others on 15 October 1999. Following the TRC hearing, South African lawyer Anton Alberts commented to the "woza" news agency: "If you look at the Lockerbie disaster - this is very similar. I think Britain would like to see these guys are prosecuted in England even though they get amnesty here."

=== Kidnapping and assassination ===
==== Ruth Slovo ====
Williamson ordered the assassination of Ruth Slovo, who was an exiled campaigner for the Anti-Apartheid Movement, close friend of Sweden's prime minister, Olof Palme and the ANC author of a pioneering study of Namibia. She was also the wife of the South African Communist Party's leader, Joe Slovo. She was killed by a letter-bomb in Maputo, Mozambique on 18 August 1982.

==== Mozambique ====
In January 1984, minutes of the apartheid State Security Council, chaired by Prime Minister P. W. Botha, recorded Craig Williamson as plotting the overthrow of the government in Mozambique.

==== Jeanette and Katryn Schoon ====
In mid-1984 Craig Williamson mailed a letter-bomb which on 28 June killed Jeanette Schoon, who was the wife of Marius Schoon, and their six-year-old daughter Katryn, at the family's home in exile in Lubango in Angola. Both Jeanette and Marius Schoon were prominent South African anti-apartheid activists and members of the ANC. While in exile in Botswana some years earlier, the Schoons had broken Williamson's cover internally within the ANC, several months before his public exposure in the UK, allowing the ANC leadership to attempt to manipulate Williamson covertly for their own purposes.

The Schoons' younger son Fritz, then aged three, witnessed the murder of his mother and sister at close hand; found wandering alone in the house, and severely traumatised, he developed epilepsy from which he never fully recovered. Following Williamson's application for amnesty for the killings, Schoon filed a civil suit against Williamson, seeking damages for his son. However, the suit was suspended pending Williamson's Amnesty hearing.

It has never been determined whether the letter-bomb had been addressed specifically to Marius Schoon or to both him and his wife; Williamson claimed to his subordinate, the bomb-maker Jerry Raven, that the former was the case. In June 2000, a year after Marius Schoon died of lung cancer, TRC amnesty for this killing and that of Ruth Slovo was granted to Williamson, despite Marius Schoon's earlier testimony strongly opposing amnesty. Schoon had argued that the whole truth about the murder of his wife and daughter had not, as required, been revealed by Williamson, and that the murder of his wife and daughter had been carried out in revenge.

Williamson's bomb-maker, Jerry Raven, testified:

"I did not know who the letters were intended for. It was only after the death of Jeanette Schoon and their child and the congratulations from Mr. Williamson, that I realised that they had been the targets for one of the devices I had manufactured. On questioning Williamson about the Schoon incident he said that the letter had been intended for Marius Schoon but it served the[m] right. He alleged that the Schoons had always used their daughter as their bomb disposal expert. On requesting clarification he said that whenever they received suspicious parcels they would throw them in the back yard and let the child play with them until such time they deemed it fit to open them."

=== Political aspirations ===
William aspired to be a politician, but failed to win a position as National Party MP for Bryanston. He was appointed to the President's Council in 1987, remaining in the position until 1991.

== Other incidents possibly linked to Williamson ==
On 21 February 1986, Swedish Prime Minister Olof Palme addressed the anti-apartheid conference Svensk folkriksdag mot apartheid (Swedish People's Parliament Against Apartheid) at the People's House in Stockholm, Sweden. A week later, Palme was shot and killed after attending the cinema with his wife, Lisbeth Palme. The subsequent Stockholm Police investigation into the murder was criticised for its lassitude and incompetence for not quickly solving the crime. Five days after Palme's murder, Swedish author and journalist Per Wästberg reported twice to the Swedish police that South African intelligence services must have been involved, but no action was taken by the police. Ten years later, Williamson was named in a South African court for Palme's murder, as were three others: Anthony White, Roy Allen and Bertil Wedin. No South Africans were ever charged with the Palme assassination (nor was anyone else, but Christer Pettersson, who was convicted, then acquitted on appeal).

== Propaganda ==
Williamson was one of the main collaborators with Peter Worthington in the anti-militant video The ANC method - violence which was distributed by Citizens for foreign aid reform throughout Canada in 1988.

In the summer of 1988 the US-produced film Red Scorpion was made on location in South-West Africa (Namibia). South Africa helped finance the movie and the SADF provided trucks, equipment as well as extras. The action-packed movie was a sympathetic portrayal of an anti-communist guerrilla commander loosely based on Jonas Savimbi, the leader of UNITA – the Angolan rebel movement – supported by both Washington and Pretoria. The film's producer, Jack Abramoff, was also head of the International Freedom Foundation (IFF). Established in Washington in 1986 as a conservative think-tank, the IFF was in fact part of an elaborate intelligence gathering operation and, according to Craig Williamson, was designed to be "an instrument for political warfare against apartheid's foes". South Africa spent up to $1.5 million a year – until funding was withdrawn in 1992 – to underwrite Operation Babushka, the code-name by which the IFF project was known.

In a television interview in early August 2001, Williamson told the BBC's Tim Sebastian in a defence of his actions during the apartheid era, that his actions should be contrasted against the background of the Cold War and were in support of the West. The NATO bombing of Belgrade in 1999, he said, killed far more civilians than his "dirty tricks brigade" ever did.

== See also ==
- Civil Cooperation Bureau
- Executive Outcomes
- Lothar Neethling
