= 1982 bombing of the African National Congress headquarters in London =

Pro-apartheid attack by the South African government in Islington, London

Coordinates: 51.533°N 0.111°W

- Location: Islington, London, United Kingdom
- Date: 14 March 1982; 09:00 (UTC)
- Attack type: Bomb
- Deaths: 0
- Injuries: 1
- Perpetrator: South African Security Police

The London offices of the African National Congress (ANC) were wrecked by an 11-kilogram (24 lb) bomb which exploded against the rear wall at 9 am on 14 March 1982. Windows up to 400 yd (370 m) away were broken. Caretaker Vernet Mbatha, an ANC voluntary worker, who was sleeping in a flat above the offices, was injured. Significant damage was caused to buildings on White Lion Street and Penton Street, where the office was located. The offices served as the ANC's headquarters in exile since the 1960s.

Anti-apartheid activists blamed the South African government. The decision to bomb the office was made following ANC attacks in South Africa, including a rocket attack on the Voortrekkerhoogte military base in August 1981. It was also to demonstrate South Africa's displeasure with the British government. The property was repaired and was the ANC's base until Nelson Mandela's election as South African president in 1994.

General Johann Coetzee, former head of the Security Branch of the South African Police, and eight other South African policemen, admitted to the attack at an amnesty hearing of the Truth and Reconciliation Commission in Pretoria in September 1998. Coetzee claimed the "symbolic attack" was ordered by the National Party government of the time.

== See also ==
- Dulcie September
- Apartheid
