= United Workers' Union of South Africa =

Trade union in South Africa

The United Workers' Union of South Africa (UWUSA) was a general union in South Africa.

The union was launched in Durban on 1 May 1986 by Mangosuthu Buthelezi. It was closely linked with the Inkatha Freedom Party, and was opposed to the recently founded Congress of South African Trade Unions (COSATU). In particular, it opposed COSATU's call for an international boycott of South African goods. Led by general secretary Dumisani Dludla and president A. B. Mlshali, it soon claimed 150,000 members. Most of its members worked in mining, but it established footholds in some factories, often promoted by management as a more moderate alternative to COSATU.

From June 1986, UWUSA members at the Hlobane colliery regularly attacked members of the National Union of Mineworkers there, killing eleven of them. Regular violence continued between UWUSA and various COSATU-affiliated unions.

The union was secretly funded by the South African Police's Security Branch. In 1991, former police officer Brian Morrow leaked documents proving state funding for the organisation, and journalist David Beresford published them. The scandal led to a great loss of support, but the union remained active until at least 1994.
