= Tladistad =

- Location within North West (South African province) Location within South Africa
- Coordinates: 25.203°S 28.035°E
- Country: South Africa
- Province: North West
- District: Bojanala
- Municipality: Moretele

Area
  - Total: 3.30 km^{2} (1.27 sq mi)

Population (2011)
  - Total: 3,007
  - Density: 911/km^{2} (2,360/sq mi)

Racial makeup (2011)
  - Black African: 99.9%

First languages (2011)
  - Tswana: 77.7%
  - Tsonga: 15.3%
  - Northern Sotho: 2.3%
  - Zulu: 1.3%
  - Other: 3.5%
- Time zone: UTC+2 (SAST)
- PO box: 0439

Tladistad is a small village located in the Moretele subregion of the Bojanala district.

== Schools ==
Tladistad has three schools, two of which are primary schools, and the third is a secondary school.

- Tladistad Primary School
- Marapo a Thutlwa Primary School
- Seboaneng Secondary School
