= Butana Almond Nofomela =

South African security policeman convicted of murder (born 1957)

Butana Almond Nofomela (born 1957) is a former South African security policeman. On 19 October 1989, hours before he was scheduled to be executed for an unrelated non-political murder, Nofomela confessed to his involvement in a police assassination squad known as Vlakplaas that killed and terrorized opponents of apartheid. Nofomela was granted a stay of execution so he could give more information. His death sentence for the unrelated murder was commuted to life imprisonment and he was released on parole in 2009.

== Death sentence ==
Nofomela was sentenced to death in 1988 after being convicted of the murder of a white farmer, Johannes Lourens, in November 1987.

== Confession ==
On the evening of 19 October 1989, Nofomela made a confession from his death row cell in Pretoria, just hours before he was due to go to the gallows. He announced that he had information to disclose about his membership from 1980 in a death squad operated by the South African Security Police. His execution was stayed for an investigation into his allegations. He gave accounts of torture and murder that took place at the notorious Vlakplaas police farm. Nofomela identified a retired captain in the security police, Dirk Coetzee, as his old commander. Coetzee, who was hiding in Europe, confirmed that he had led one of five "hit squads" run out of a restricted police base at Vlakplaas near Pretoria.

Nofomela said he was one of seven men who raided a suspected safe house of members of the African National Congress (ANC) in Swaziland in 1983, using a hand grenade and automatic weapons. Three guerrillas were killed and one wounded in the raid. In another affidavit he stated that in November 1981, he helped kill Griffiths Mxenge, a Durban human rights lawyer said to have links to the outlawed ANC, and made the murder appear as a robbery. He also said that Coetzee had told him he might be needed to kill the victim’s wife, Victoria Mxenge; she was shot and axed to death in August 1985. Coetzee's, Tshikalange's and Nofomela's statements all corroborated one another. Nofomela also gave an account of an incident in Lamontville in which a police hit squad killed some guerillas of the ANC in late 1985. John Dugard, a law professor at the University of the Witwatersrand, said an identical incident occurred in Chesterville in 1986 in which four members of a youth organization were slain.

Nofomela applied for amnesty in respect of the Chesterville incident, and received amnesty for the killing of eight anti-apartheid activists, including Mxenge.

== Release ==
During his sentence Nofomela expressed remorse for his deeds. In an interview he reflected on how his life has changed: "Prison has been a blessing in disguise; I’m remorseful, but my eyes have been opened. I appeal to all those I've wronged to forgive me." Nofomela was released from the Pretoria Central Prison on parole in September 2009, after he had served 22 years in prison.
