= Vlakplaas =

Farm used by apartheid South African Police

- Interactive map of Vlakplaas
- Province: Gauteng
- Country: South Africa
- Coordinates: 25°49′01.3″S 28°01′39.6″E
- Area: 100 hectares

Section C1 of the Security Branch
- "Vlakplaas"
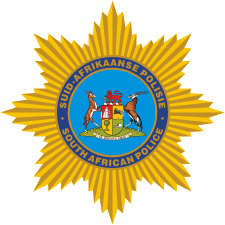
- Active: 1979–1993
- Country: South Africa
- Type: Counterinsurgency unit, paramilitary death squad
- Part of: Security Branch of the South African Police
- Headquarters: Vlakplaas, Gauteng; 25°49′01.3″S 28°01′39.6″E

Commanders
- Notable commanders: Dirk Coetzee (1980–1981); Eugene de Kock (1985–1993)

Vlakplaas (an Afrikaans term meaning "flat farm") is a farm 20 km west of Pretoria that served as the headquarters of counterinsurgency unit C1 (later called C10) of the Security Branch of the apartheid-era South African Police. Though officially called Section C1, the unit itself also became known as "Vlakplaas". Established in 1979, by 1990 it had grown from a small unit of five policemen and about fifteen askaris to a unit of nine squads.

The unit functioned as a paramilitary hit squad, capturing political opponents of the apartheid government and either "turning" (converting) or executing them. Vlakplaas farm was the site of multiple executions of political opponents of the apartheid government. The unit is known to have carried out the murders of Griffiths Mxenge in 1981 and the so-called "Chesterville Four" in 1986, among many others. C1 officers were also notorious for allegedly routinely defrauding the state, siphoning off government funds to pay agents or for their personal use.

The existence of the unit was revealed after a former member, Butana Almond Nofomela, confessed to his involvement hours before he was scheduled to be executed for an unrelated non-political murder. Nofomela was given a last minute reprieve so he could give up more information.

== The farm ==
The land at Vlakplaas was bought by the police in 1979 and later transferred to the national Department of Public Works. When the police vacated the farm in the mid-1990s, it was left in the hands of a caretaker, named Louis Steyn. In 2001, the government held a traditional healing ceremony at the farm and announced its intention to transfer the land to the Department of Arts and Culture, in order to turn it into a museum. However, Steyn successfully challenged his eviction in the High Court.

In August 2007, the Department of Science and Technology announced that the farm would be repurposed as a centre for healing. The centre would conduct research into plants used in traditional medicine, and promote collaboration between practitioners of western medicine and traditional healers. However, years later, Steyn continued to inhabit the farm. He left in 2012, passing the land on to friends, who in turn passed it on to a Christian ministry, Kuriaké, which used it to establish an addiction rehabilitation centre. The ministry was evicted in June 2014, at which point the government planned to transfer it to the Department of Arts and Culture for use as a heritage site.

== Commanding officers ==
C1 was commanded by:

- Johannes Jacobus Viktor (1979–80)
- Dirk Coetzee (1980–81)
- Jan Carel Coetzee (1982)
- Jack Cronje (1983–85)
- Eugene de Kock (1985–93)

== Other members ==
- Joe Mamasela
- Brian Ngqulunga

== See also ==
- Civil Cooperation Bureau
- Bureau of State Security
