= Griffiths Mxenge =

South African activist (1935–1981)

Griffiths Mlungisi Mxenge (27 February 1935 – 19 November 1981) was born in KwaRayi, a rural settlement outside of King Williams Town, Eastern Cape. He was a civil rights lawyer, a member of the African National Congress (ANC) and a South African anti-apartheid activist.

== Early life ==
Griffiths Mlungisi Mxenge was the eldest son of Johnson Pinti and Hannah Nowise Mxenge. His parents were farmers in KwaRayi. He began his high schooling at Forbes Grant Secondary school in Ginsberg but matriculated from Newell High school in Port Elizabeth in 1956.

In 1959, he received a bachelor's degree from Fort Hare University majoring in Roman Dutch Law and English. He joined the African National Congress Youth League while he was studying. The Defiance Campaign and the Congress of the People in Kliptown contributed to his political consciousness

He enrolled for an LLB degree at the University of Natal in 1962, the same year he married Victoria Mxenge.

In 1966, his studies were interrupted when he was detained for 190 days. In 1967, he was imprisoned for two years on Robben Island under the Suppression of Communism Act for furthering the aims of the ANC. Mxenge's first son, Mbasa, was born while he was in detention.

In 1969, Mxenge was released from Robben Island and served with a two-year banning order that among other things prohibited him from entering University premises. With the help of the Dean of Law Faculty, the late Professor Tony Matthews, he was still able to complete his LLB and graduate in 1970.

His second son, Viwe was born in 1970.

== Career ==
In 1971 Mxenge began serving his articles under Rabie Bugwandeen of the Natal Indian Congress. He was issued with a five-year banning order the same year.

In 1974, he was admitted as an attorney of the Supreme Court of South Africa. The following year, in 1975, he opened his own legal practice in Durban. His daughter, Namhla, was also born. He represented members of the African National Congress and other parties. Notably, he defended Joseph Mduli, a member of the ANC and Umkonto weSizwe, who was brutally murdered. In an unprecedented move, following Mxenge's efforts and international pressure, four policemen were charged with the murder of Mduli.

Mxenge was later detained for his involvement in the murder case.

He was an active member of the Release Mandela Committee and served as a member of the Lawyers for Human Rights. Mxenge was a founding member of the South African Democratic Lawyers Association.

== Assassination ==
In 1981, Mxenge was assassinated by Security Branch of South African Police, led by Dirk Coetzee, in Umlazi township south of Durban. He was abducted before the death squad stabbed him 45 times, beat him with a hammer and slit his throat. His body was found near a football field in Umlazi. Four years after her husband's murder, Victoria Mxenge was shot and hacked to death in front of her children at their Umlazi home in Durban.

In 1989, Butana Almond Nofomela, a former member of Coetzee's death squad, confessed to his involvement in Mxenge's murder hours before he was scheduled to be executed for an unrelated non-political murder. Coetzee later confirmed Nofomela's story. On 4 November 1996, former Vlakplaas commander, Dirk Coetzee, testified about his involvement in the murder of Griffiths Mxenge. He also asked for amnesty from the Truth and Reconciliation Commission. Despite protests from Mxenge's family, Coetzee was granted amnesty.

Nofomela, who'd been granted a stay of execution in the unrelated murder case, later had his death sentence commuted to life in prison. He was released on parole in September 2009.

== Legacy ==
Mxenge and his wife were both awarded the Order of Luthuli in Silver by the South African government. His award recognised his contribution to the field of law and the supreme sacrifice he made in the fight against apartheid in South Africa

The Victoria and Griffiths Mxenge memorial lecture is hosted annually at the University of KwaZulu Natal's Howard College.

Griffiths Mxenge Highway in Umlazi, Durban, is named in his honour.

== See also ==
- Dirk Coetzee
- Death squad
