= Chesterville, KwaZulu-Natal =

Town in South Africa

Chesterville/Bhlekese
- Location within KwaZulu-Natal Location within South Africa
- Coordinates: 29.851°S 30.944°E
- Country: South Africa
- Province: KwaZulu-Natal
- Municipality: eThekwini
- Main Place: Durban

Area
  - Total: 2.09 km^{2} (0.81 sq mi)

Population (2011)
  - Total: 15,840
  - Density: 7,580/km^{2} (19,600/sq mi)

Racial makeup (2011)
  - Black African: 99.1%
  - Coloured: 0.2%
  - Indian/Asian: 0.1%
  - White: 0.5%
  - Other: 0.1%

First languages (2011)
  - Zulu: 84.9%
  - Xhosa: 4.5%
  - English: 4.0%
  - Sotho: 1.3%
  - Other: 5.2%
- Time zone: UTC+2 (SAST)
- Postal code (street): 4091
- PO box: 4138

Chesterville is a town in eThekwini in the KwaZulu-Natal province of South Africa.

The village lies between Cato Manor and Westville, some 13 km west of the city of Durban. Chesterville is named after T. J. Chester, a former manager of the Native Administration Department of Durban.

The writer Nat Nakasa was reburied in Chesterville, which was his childhood home, after his body was returned from the United States, where he died in exile.
