= Eugene de Kock =

South African police colonel and head of C10 (born 1949)

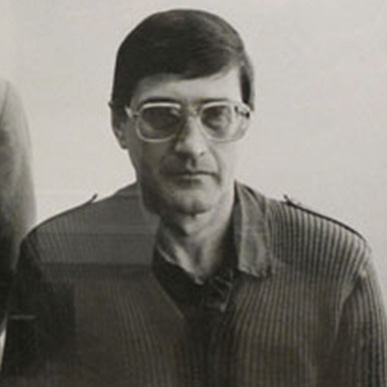
- Eugene de Kock in 1997
- Born: 29 January 1949 (age 77); South Africa
- Other name: Prime Evil
- Occupation: Member of the South African Police (SAP)
- Known for: Role in the apartheid-era counter-insurgency division of the SAP
- Awards: Police Cross at Sevran
- Status: Paroled
- Conviction: Crimes against humanity
- Penalty: Life imprisonment

Eugene Alexander de Kock (born 29 January 1949) is a former South African Police colonel, torturer, and assassin, active under the apartheid government. Nicknamed "Prime Evil" by the press, De Kock was the commanding officer of C10, a counterinsurgency unit of the SAP that kidnapped, tortured, and murdered numerous accused terrorists from the 1980s to the early 1990s. C10's victims included members of the African National Congress.

Following South Africa's transition to democracy in 1994, De Kock disclosed the full scope of C10's crimes and acknowledged the loss the families of the victims he was instructed to murder suffered while testifying before the Truth and Reconciliation Commission. In 1996, he was tried and convicted on eighty-nine charges and sentenced to two concurrent life terms plus 212 years in prison. Since beginning his sentence, De Kock has accused several members of the apartheid government, including former State President F. W. de Klerk, of permitting C10's activities. In 2015, he was granted parole.

== Early life and service ==
Eugene Alexander de Kock was born to Lourens Vosloo de Kock, a magistrate and personal friend to former prime minister John Vorster. Vosloo "Vossie" de Kock, Eugene's brother, later described him as a "quiet" boy who "wasn't a violent person." He also recounted how their father, a member of the Afrikaner Broederbond, indoctrinated the boys in Afrikaner nationalist ideology and taught them "strict Afrikaans" as they grew up.

De Kock developed a long-time ambition of becoming an officer. In 1967, after completing high school, he performed his year-long national service in Pretoria at the Army Gymnasium. During this time, he and the rest of the Gymnasium's six companies were deployed to Rhodesia's border with Botswana to confront militant ANC incursions. De Kock graduated from the Gymnasium as an infantry soldier in the South African Defence Force. However, he decided not to attend the officers college in Saldanha Bay because of a stutter, and declined to pursue a B. Mil degree. He joined the South African Police's uniform branch in the Eastern Cape.

De Kock underwent off-duty training at Pretoria's Baviaanspoort Prison with members of the Security Police under Captain de Swart, in what later was to become the SAP's Special Task Force. In 1976, instead of accepting an invitation to train new Special Task Force members, De Kock reported to the Police College for an officers' course and was promoted from warrant officer to lieutenant.

In May 1978, De Kock was transferred to South West Africa and joined the security branch in Oshakati. In 1979, he co-founded Koevoet, an SAP counterinsurgency unit tasked with combating the People's Liberation Army of Namibia (PLAN) during the South African Border War. Koevoet was regarded as a highly effective unit, but committed atrocities against civilians and other human rights violations. Its successes in tracking and killing PLAN guerrillas prompted the SAP to consider setting up a similar division in South Africa.

While testifying at the Truth and Reconciliation Commission, De Kock recounted one incident during his time serving in the Border War in Angola. He'd captured a group of prisoners and brought them back to the camp. Instead of being congratulated, however, he was reprimanded, and then watched as the prisoners were beaten by superiors.

''Why so many?''

== Vlakplaas ==
In 1983, the SAP transferred De Kock to C10, a counter-insurgency unit headquartered at a farm called Vlakplaas, located 20 kilometres (12 mi) west of Pretoria. De Kock, who had established a reputation for commitment during his tours in Rhodesia and Namibia, was promoted as the unit's commanding officer two years later. Under his leadership, C10—later known as C1—became a death squad which hunted down and killed militant opponents of the National Party and the apartheid system.

== TRC testimony ==
De Kock first became prominent during his testimony in the Truth and Reconciliation Commission in 1998, during which he made multiple revelations relating to ANC deaths.

De Kock has been interviewed a number of times by psychologist Pumla Gobodo-Madikizela, who ended up releasing a book, A Human Being Died That Night, about her interviews with De Kock, her time on the TRC, and what causes a moral person to become a killer.

== Trial, conviction, and sentencing ==
Upon being convicted on 30 October 1996, De Kock was sentenced to two life sentences plus 212 years in prison for crimes against humanity. The eighty-nine charges included six counts of murder, as well as conspiracy to murder, attempted murder, assault, kidnapping, illegal possession of a firearm, and fraud. De Kock served his sentence in the C Max section of the Pretoria Central Prison.

== Imprisonment ==
In a local radio interview in July 2007, De Kock claimed that former president FW de Klerk's hands were "soaked in blood" and that de Klerk had ordered political killings and other crimes during the anti-apartheid conflict. These claims were in response to de Klerk's then-recent statements that he had a "clear conscience" regarding his time in office.

The Sunday Independent reported in January 2010 that De Kock was seeking a presidential pardon from President Jacob Zuma in exchange for more information about the apartheid government's death squads, and that a three-hour meeting between Zuma and the incarcerated De Kock took place in April 2009. A spokesman for Zuma denied the veracity of the report.

In 2012, De Kock made several pleas for forgiveness to the relatives of his victims. In January, he wrote a letter to the family of Bheki Mlangeni, apologising for killing the ANC attorney in a 1991 bomb attack; Mlangeni's mother, Catherine, doubted De Kock's sincerity as he had never before shown remorse. In February, De Kock met Marcia Khoza in his prison, confessing that he had personally executed her mother, Portia Shabangu, in an ambush in 1989; Khoza would not forgive him, because he had scarcely shown remorse during his TRC hearing.

In September 2014, De Kock met the Mamas, the family of another of his victims. Candice Mama, daughter of the late Glenack Masilo Mama, did forgive De Kock, even going as far as to express in countless interviews support for his bid for parole.

=== Parole ===
Justice Minister Michael Masutha announced on 30 January 2015, that De Kock had been granted parole. At the press conference, it was announced that the date of his release would not be made public. Masutha further said that De Kock had expressed remorse for his crimes and had co-operated with authorities to recover the remains of a number of his victims. De Kock was nevertheless to remain on parole for the rest of his life.

== See also ==
- Dirk Coetzee
- Craig Williamson
- Civil Cooperation Bureau
- Wouter Basson
- Lothar Neethling
- Janusz Waluś
- Siphiwe Mvuyane
