= Viola Hashe =

South African anti-apartheid activist

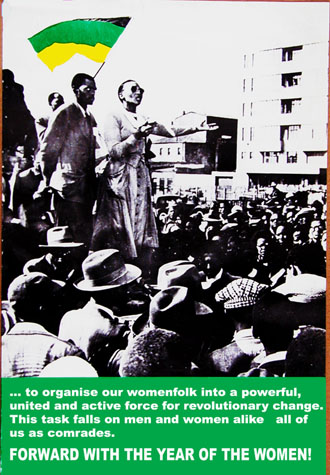
Viola Hashe addresses the crowd in a poster designed by Thami Mnyele.

Viola Hashe (1926-1977) was a teacher, anti-apartheid activist and trade unionist in South Africa. Hashe was also blind.

== Biography ==
Hashe was born in 1926 in the Orange Free State. She started working with the trade unions and joined the African National Congress (ANC) in the 1950s. She became a member of the South African Congress of Trade Unions (SACTU) in the mid-1950s. In 1956, she worked on the South African Clothing Workers Union (SACWU) where she became the first woman leader of an all-male South African union. Hashe spoke at the SACTU conference in Durban where she discussed passes for women, since women weren't allowed to hold passes.

Hashe became the first woman to be threatened with deportation under the Urban Areas Act in 1956. She had the counsel of Shulamith Muller, and the order to deport her was rescinded "barely seven hours before the order was to take effect." In 1963, Hashe was banned under the Suppression of Communism Act, 1950 and then "restricted to Roodepoort" until her death in 1977.

Hashe influenced many people who became activists or who were already working as activists. These included Bertha Gxowa, Mabel Balfour, and Mary Moodley. A branch of the African National Congress Youth League is named after Hashe.

== See also ==
- List of people subject to banning orders under apartheid

Trade union offices
Preceded by Gana Makabeni	General Secretary of the African Clothing Workers' Union; 1956–1962	Succeeded by Union merged
