= Irish Anti-Apartheid Movement =

- Abbreviation: IAAM
- Formation: April 22, 1964
- Founder: Kader Asmal and Louise Asmal
- Founded at: Dublin, Ireland
- Dissolved: 1994
- Type: NGO
- Legal status: Voluntary organisation
- Headquarters: 173 Barton Road East, Dundrum, Dublin 14
- Location: Dublin, Ireland
- Region served: Ireland (Republic of Ireland and Northern Ireland)
- Members: approx. 10,000 (cumulative, over the Movement's history)
- Chairman: Ernest Wood (1964 to 1972); Kader Asmal (1972 to 1991)
- President: Rev. Terence McCaughey
- Honorary Secretary: Barry Desmond
- Publication: Amandla; Irish Anti-Apartheid News
- Affiliations: British Anti-Apartheid Movement

The Irish Anti-Apartheid Movement (IAAM) was an organisation founded in Dublin in April 1964 to campaign against apartheid in South Africa. Founded by the exiled South African legal scholar Kader Asmal and his wife Louise, it grew from a small Dublin discussion group into a national movement before its dissolution in 1994, following the end of apartheid. Membership was estimated at between 1,500 and 2,000 by 1974, and the historian Connal Parr has put its cumulative membership at approximately 30,000 people over the course of its existence. According to Nelson Mandela, Ireland ranked alongside the Netherlands and the Scandinavian countries as one of the leading Western nations in the anti-apartheid solidarity movement. The Movement is best remembered for its long-running campaigns against South African rugby tours and for its complex, at times strained, relationship with the Dunnes Stores anti-apartheid strike of 1984 to 1987.

== Background ==
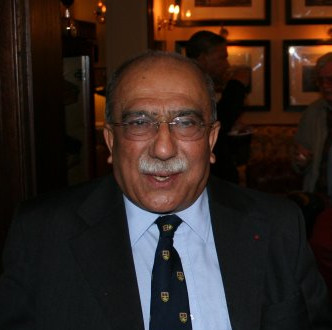
Kader Asmal, seen here in 2007

Historic ties between Ireland and South Africa predated the IAAM by decades. Around 30,000 Irish soldiers fought on the British side in the Second Boer War of 1899 to 1902, while a smaller Irish Transvaal Brigade, led by Major John MacBride, fought for the Boer republics. Sinn Féin founder Arthur Griffith had worked as a journalist and miner in the Transvaal before returning to Ireland in 1888, and a strong pro-Boer current existed among Irish nationalists during the war. Relations between the Irish Free State and the Union of South Africa were cordial through the 1920s and 1930s, both being Dominions seeking greater autonomy from London, and South African premier J. B. M. Hertzog made a state visit to Dublin in 1930. The Irish Roman Catholic Church also maintained a substantial missionary presence in South Africa, and Irish-descended clergy, including Archbishop Denis Hurley of Durban, were prominent critics of apartheid from within the country.

Organised opposition to apartheid in Ireland first emerged among international students. In late 1959, Trinity College Dublin's Afro-Asian Society formed an ad hoc "Dublin Boycott Protest Council", and in February 1960 around 200 people, mostly students, marched from Trinity to the Mansion House to hear the exiled African National Congress (ANC) Youth League leader Tennyson Makiwane, alongside veteran Irish republican Dan Breen and suffragist Helen Chenevix. This early momentum dissipated after the Sharpeville massacre of March 1960, largely because the campaign's base of international students dispersed for the summer term. The Minister for External Affairs, Frank Aiken, responded to the killings with a public statement declaring that "the Irish people have been deeply shocked by the tragic happenings in South Africa", though Aiken subsequently doubted the effectiveness of economic sanctions and regarded southern Africa as being of little concern to Irish foreign policy, which was dominated by his commitment to Ireland's work at the United Nations.

== Formation ==
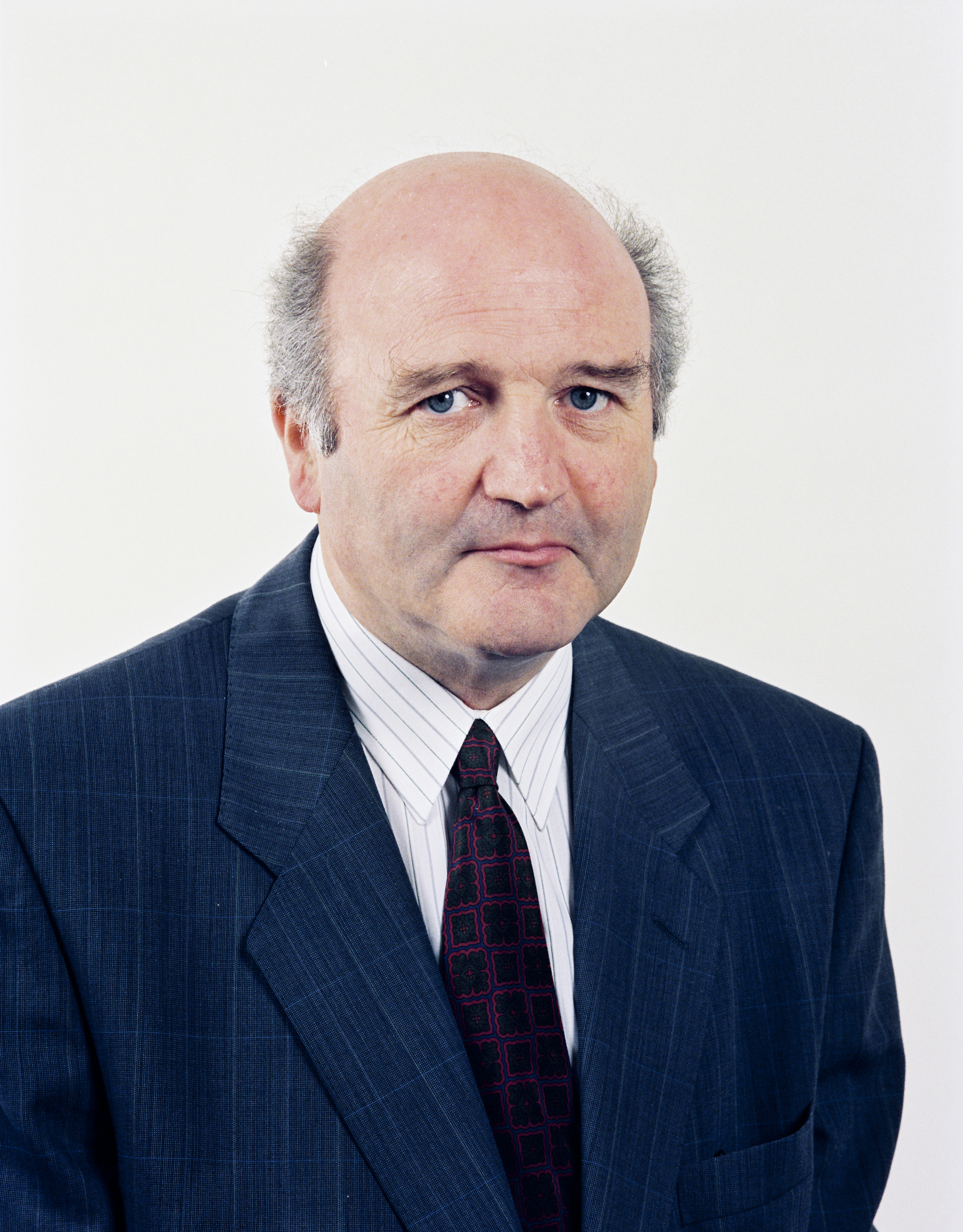
High profile Labour politician Barry Desmond (seen here in 1989) was drawn into the organisation early on

The Movement's establishment followed the arrival in Dublin of Kader Asmal, a South African-born barrister of Indian descent who had been active in London's exile community and had helped found the British Anti-Apartheid Movement in 1960. Asmal, whose marriage to the English activist Louise Parkinson would have made him liable to prosecution in South Africa under the Mixed Marriages Act and the Immorality Act, took up a law lectureship at Trinity College Dublin in 1963 on the recommendation of Conor Cruise O'Brien, and on the advice of ANC leader Oliver Tambo that he use the post to organise anti-apartheid activity in Ireland. In his youth, Asmal had been gifted of a copy of James Connolly's Labour in Irish History from his father, which Asmal later with shaping his political instincts.

After a well-attended Trinity lecture by escaped Rivonia Trial defendant Arthur Goldreich, Asmal concluded that a national movement was viable, and the IAAM was launched at a public meeting in the Mansion House on 22 April 1964. Over nine hundred people attended the launch, at which Asmal was elected vice-chair and Louise honorary administrative secretary, and speakers included the recently released ANC activist Ruth First, Senator Dominick Murphy of the Irish Congress of Trade Unions, and Michael Harmel, a South African of Irish parentage who had claimed Irish citizenship after being refused a South African passport. The inaugural meeting featured speakers from Fianna Fáil, Fine Gael, and Labour as well, in Asmal's recollection, an audience "liberally sprinkled with nuns". Barrister Ernest Wood served as the Movement's first chairman and trade unionist Barry Desmond as honorary secretary, though Asmal's influence predominated from the outset; he became chairman himself in 1972, a position he held until 1991.

The IAAM's stated aims were to inform the Irish public about conditions in South Africa, to campaign for the release of political prisoners, and to promote a boycott of South African goods. Its constitution set out four objectives:

1. to inform Irish people about apartheid
2. to campaign for international action against it and lobby the Irish government
3. to cooperate with South African organisations opposing apartheid
4. to support the International Defence and Aid Fund.

It was organised on a non-party, non-sectarian, all-island basis, with an early branch established in Belfast, and its executive committee met fortnightly at the Asmals' home for much of its history. Support was drawn from trade unionists, clergy of both main denominations, academics and politicians across the political spectrum. Asmal deliberately sought sponsorship from well-known public figures to broaden the Movement's appeal, and future president Mary Robinson, one of Asmal's earliest law students at Trinity, later became an IAAM sponsor. The Movement published a monthly newsletter, Amandla, and in 1965 issued a booklet, Ireland and South Africa: the case against apartheid, which became its principal recruiting document.

Kader Asmal was frequently described by colleagues as running the IAAM in an autocratic fashion, though the broad front strategy he pursued, discouraging the involvement of "ultra-Left" elements in order to maximise cross-party appeal, is credited by historians with the movement's longevity and its comparative success in attracting supporters from across the political spectrum, unlike equivalent movements in Britain and the United States. Branches of IAAM were established outside Dublin from the late 1960s onward, including in Cork, Belfast, Waterford, Limerick, Sligo, and, from 1975, a particularly active East Cork branch founded by students of St Mary's High School, Midleton, following a screening of the documentary Last Grave at Dimbaza. The Belfast branch, revived in 1979 under the Reverend Norman W. Taggart and later secretary Avila Kilmurray, reported a more hostile local reception than in Dublin, owing to Loyalist sympathy for white-minority rule.

The IAAM pioneered a modern style of political lobbying in Ireland, writing to every candidate ahead of the 1969 general election with a questionnaire on apartheid and organising a two-day "Dáil Lobby" in November 1965 in which members met local TDs at Leinster House or at constituency clinics. This tactic was credited by several politicians with introducing many backbenchers to the anti-apartheid cause for the first time.

== International Defence and Aid Fund ==
The Irish section of the International Defence and Aid Fund (IDAF), a clandestine operation coordinated internationally from London by Canon John Collins, raised money for the legal defence and welfare of families of political prisoners in South Africa. Banned in South Africa in March 1966, the fund operated through a chain of "cut-outs" to disguise the origin and purpose of remittances, with Louise Asmal and Garry Kilgallen serving as the chief Irish organisers. Irish letter writers, recruited discreetly and predominantly women, corresponded with South African families as though personal friends, while money was transferred through untraceable small-denomination postal orders, a system facilitated by Louise Asmal's friendship with the governor of the Bank of Ireland, Louden Ryan. Among the letter writers was Stella Desmond, wife of Labour TD Barry Desmond, who relinquished the role around 1981 out of concern that Irish Special Branch, which was known to have monitored the Asmals' telephone, might trace the operation to her husband, then a government minister. The IDAF was unbanned in 1990 and wound up two years later.

== Trade union support ==
Trade unions provided the IAAM with organisational manpower from its earliest years, a feature that distinguished the Irish movement from equivalent bodies elsewhere in western Europe. Kader Asmal developed close relationships with union leaders including Michael "Mickey" Mullen of the Irish Transport and General Workers' Union and Donal Nevin of the Irish Congress of Trade Unions, giving evening law classes to trade unionists and drafting rule books and constitutions for several Irish unions. A major conference titled "Brother Lend a Hand", held at Dublin's Shelbourne Hotel in September 1966, brought together around 140 trade unionists to hear South African exile Phyllis Altman describe the international solidarity that had helped protect her union from suppression. Brendan Scott, a leading figure in the Association of Secondary Teachers in Ireland, served as the IAAM's honorary secretary until stomach cancer forced his early death, and was credited by Asmal with cementing links between the movement and organised labour. The Irish Congress of Trade Unions formally reaffirmed its support for the IAAM at its 1972 annual conference in Galway and subsequently established a liaison committee with the movement. Following the death of Mullen in 1982, the IAAM established the Michael Mullen Memorial Trust Fund, which had raised £6,000 for South African workers by April 1983.

== Sporting boycott campaigns ==
The IAAM's most sustained and public campaigns targeted sporting contact between Ireland and South Africa, particularly rugby union.

=== 1965 tour ===
The Movement's first major campaign opposed the Irish leg of the 1965 South Africa rugby union tour of Scotland and Ireland. Around 50,000 leaflets were distributed and a public declaration of boycott was circulated among sportsmen and clubs. President Éamon de Valera did not attend the international at Lansdowne Road, which the Movement claimed as a symbolic victory, while around 400 demonstrators gathered outside the ground.

=== 1969–70 tour ===
A far larger campaign accompanied the 1969–70 Springbok tour, matched in intensity by the "Stop the 70 Tour" campaign in Britain. The Taoiseach, Jack Lynch, declined a request from the IAAM to have the Irish Rugby Football Union (IRFU) cancel the fixture, while the IRFU's president, Sinclair Irwin, maintained that protesters did not represent most Irish people. The Irish Congress of Trade Unions instructed members to "black" the South African team, and the Post Office Officials' Association disrupted broadcast facilities at the Springboks' hotel. The team was housed at the non-unionised Royal Starlight Hotel in Bray, County Wicklow, after Dublin hotels came under pressure from the IAAM not to accommodate them, and it was picketed overnight by demonstrators who blew whistles to disrupt the players' sleep. At least 6,000 people marched to Lansdowne Road in January 1970, the biggest anti-apartheid demonstration of the tour anywhere in Britain or Ireland, and the international was eventually played behind barbed wire before a sparse crowd, with the President, Taoiseach and government ministers all staying away. A separate militant group, the Campaign Against Racial Apartheid (CARA), undertook more confrontational actions such as egg-throwing and sit-down protests, allowing the IAAM to maintain its "broad front" image while privately funding such activity. One CARA activist recalled that Asmal "would give us money for the paint but he wouldn't do the painting". Decades later, Mandela told an interviewer that his fellow Robben Island prisoners had been beaten by warders in apparent retaliation for the Dublin protests.

=== 1979 Barbarians tour ===
In September 1979, the Irish government refused entry to a South African Barbarians rugby team, with the Minister for Foreign Affairs, Michael O'Kennedy, persuading the IRFU to abandon the fixture and the government drafting deportation orders in case it did not comply. The IAAM, buoyed by this result, subsequently campaigned against a proposed Irish Lions tour of South Africa, gathering declarations of support from Irish athletes across several sports.

=== 1981 tour ===
The Irish Rugby Football Union (IRFU) nonetheless toured South Africa in 1981, prompting what has been described as the most serious confrontation between an Irish government and a sporting body in the history of the state. The IAAM wrote to Taoiseach Charles Haughey urging him to intervene, and Haughey personally warned IRFU officials that the tour would damage vital national interests, but the union proceeded regardless. The Minister for Foreign Affairs, Brian Lenihan Snr, also met the IRFU, warning that the trip could damage Ireland's diplomatic standing as a member of the UN Security Council. The union nonetheless found its subsequent grant applications to the Department of Foreign Affairs rejected for the remainder of the decade. A march of several thousand, organised by more than forty bodies and addressed by Asmal, took place before the Ireland-England fixture at Lansdowne Road that March to denounce the planned tour. Asmal disputed the Garda estimate of 700 marchers, insisting the true figure was around 6,000. Three Irish players, Tony Ward, Moss Keane and Donal Spring, refused to travel on principle, while others resigned their jobs in order to go. Ward, who had visited South Africa with the British Lions in 1980, later described the trip as the moment "some switch had been turned on" in his understanding of apartheid, and he received a letter of thanks from Kader Asmal for his stance. A fourth player, Hugo MacNeill, also declined to travel after being influenced by the development charity GOAL rather than by direct contact with the IAAM, while Munster centre David Irwin cited academic commitments. The IRFU did not formally cease planning fixtures against South Africa until October 1989, when it nonetheless permitted several officials and one player to join a World XV tour of South Africa, drawing further government condemnation.

== Cultural boycott ==
From its founding, the IAAM pursued a parallel cultural and academic boycott of South Africa, believing that music, literature and theatre were especially effective at engaging public sympathy. At a press conference at Dublin's Power's Royal Hotel on 22 September 1964, twenty-five Irish playwrights, including John B. Keane, Hugh Leonard, Tom Murphy, Brian Friel and Samuel Beckett, signed a declaration refusing performance rights for their plays before segregated South African audiences. From 1970, the movement monitored Irish entertainers who performed in South Africa, maintaining the Irish section of the United Nations' Register of Entertainers, Actors and Others Who Have Performed in Apartheid South Africa, which was established in 1983. Performers who agreed to sign a pledge not to return, including comedian Hal Roach, harpist Mary O'Hara, and the folk duo Foster and Allen, had their names removed from the Register, while others, such as songwriter Phil Coulter, contested their inclusion; Coulter successfully sued the IAAM for libel over the matter in 1983. The IAAM also picketed international performers including Elton John and Shirley Bassey over their appearances at the Sun City resort in the Bophuthatswana bantustan, and it publicly criticised American musician Paul Simon over his 1987 Graceland tour, which Kader Asmal regarded as a breach of the cultural boycott despite its use of black South African musicians.

Actress Siobhán McKenna addressed the UN Special Committee Against Apartheid in New York on 19 March 1982, linking her career in theatre to the anti-apartheid cause, a speech that Kader Asmal described as having "done Ireland proud". The Field Day Theatre Company, whose board members were broadly supportive of the movement, staged Athol Fugard's Boesman and Lena in 1983, touring it to venues on both sides of the Irish border. Poet Seamus Heaney was a regular reader at IAAM fundraising events from 1967 onward and appeared on the Dunnes Stores picket line in October 1985 in protest at the execution of South African poet Benjamin Moloise. Exiled South African poet Dennis Brutus, who had been shot and imprisoned on Robben Island before his release, made several visits to Ireland between the 1960s and 1980s to read his work and discuss the sporting and cultural boycotts. Notably, the IAAM did not engage with Bob Geldof's Live Aid campaign of 1985, with some members privately regarding it as an apolitical form of "charity" at odds with the movement's more radical solidarity politics.

== Republicanism and links to the IRA ==
The IAAM operated carefully around the question of Northern Ireland, publicly maintaining that it confined itself to the single purpose of opposing apartheid, while informally tolerating a degree of overlap with republican circles. Several Executive Committee members in the mid-1960s, including Cathal MacLiam and Anthony Coughlan, were also involved with the Wolfe Tone Society and the Connolly Association, and Kader Asmal lectured to both organisations and to IRA volunteers during the 1960s. A meeting he addressed in Belfast on 29 January 1967 is credited with helping to bring the Northern Ireland Civil Rights Association into being. In 1981, both Official Sinn Féin/The Workers' Party and Provisional Sinn Féin were officially affiliated with the Movement. In his posthumously published memoir, Politics in My Blood (2011), Asmal disclosed that in the late 1970s he had used Communist Party of Ireland general secretary Michael O'Riordan as an intermediary to approach Gerry Adams of Provisional Sinn Féin, arranging for two Provisional IRA members to provide explosives training in Dublin to two operatives of the ANC's armed wing, Umkhonto we Sizwe. Asmal linked this training to the June 1980 bombing of the Sasolburg oil refinery near Johannesburg, while stressing that he had never personally supported the IRA. The attack, which Asmal called the biggest fire in South African history to that point, caused an estimated £3.3 million of damage and was described by future British Foreign Secretary David Miliband as one of the few justifiable acts of violence carried out by the ANC. Subsequent scholarship has confirmed that an ANC-IRA channel existed, though accounts of exactly where the training took place remain contradictory.

The IAAM also supported the case of Robert McBride, an ANC political prisoner sentenced to death for a 1986 car bombing and rumoured to be a distant relative of the executed 1916 leader John MacBride. His death sentence was commuted in 1992 following an Irish-backed clemency campaign, and IAAM chairman Garry Kilgallen visited him on death row in 1991. McBride later advised Gerry Adams, through relative Tiernan MacBride, to move toward a ceasefire ahead of the Northern Ireland peace process.

== Sinn Féin affiliation dispute ==
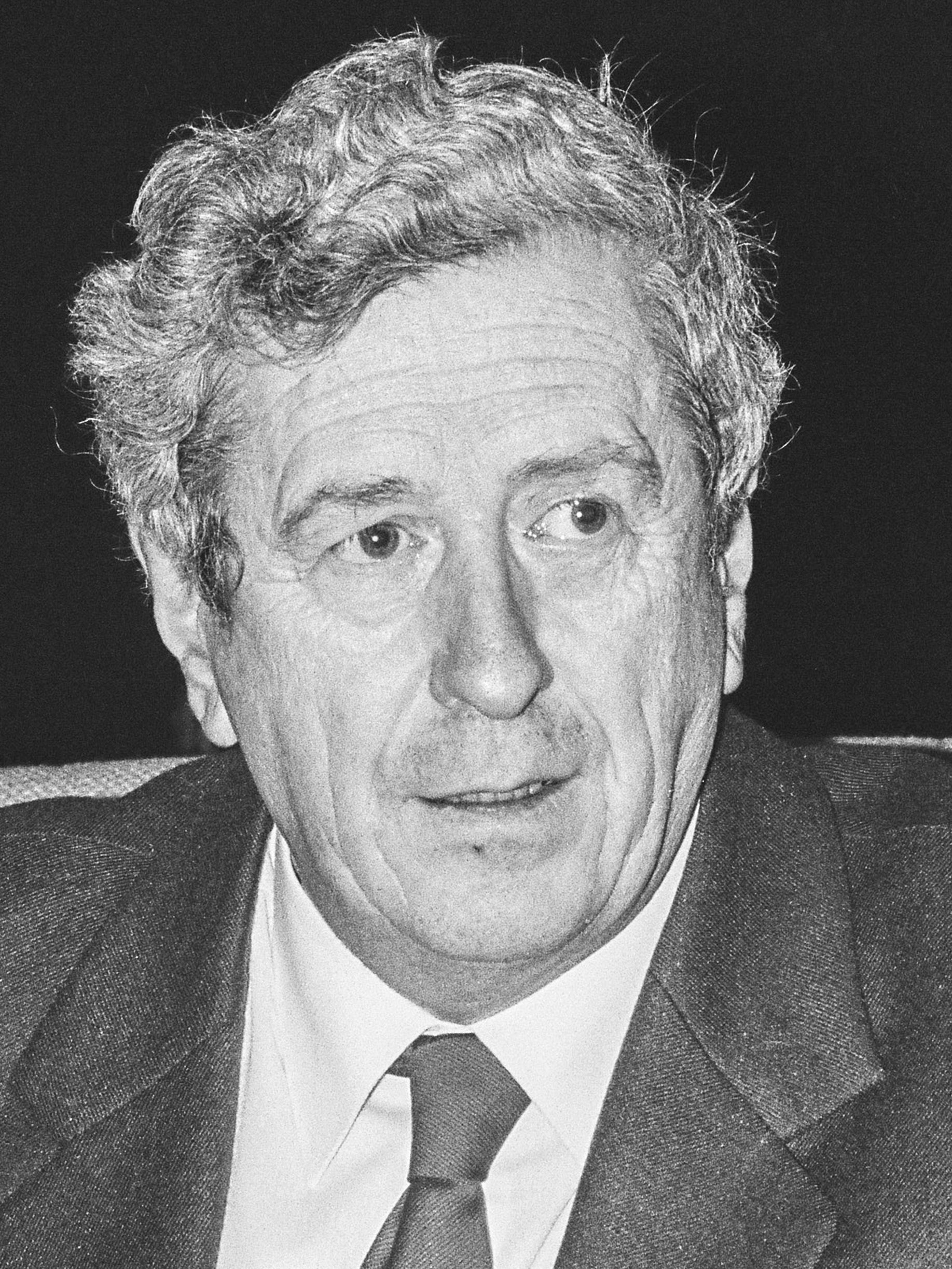
The IAAM's inclusion of Sinn Féin in their organisation lead to high-profile resignations in 1984, including that of Taoiseach Garret FitzGerald.

The question of Sinn Féin's IAAM membership came to a head in 1984, after the Fine Gael-Labour coalition government adopted a policy in February that year of refusing all contact with Sinn Féin representatives. A motion by Labour's Niall Greene to expel Sinn Féin was narrowly defeated at a stormy Executive meeting that October, after Asmal argued that excluding any affiliate on grounds unconnected to South Africa would breach the Movement's non-party principle. Three senior Labour Party figures, Dick Spring, Ruairí Quinn and Michael D. Higgins, resigned in protest, followed by SDLP leader John Hume, founding Executive member Barry Desmond, and Taoiseach Garret FitzGerald. Fitzgerald had been a long-standing IAAM patron who had chaired its conferences while serving as Minister for Foreign Affairs. Desmond later recalled that his decision was influenced by Asmal's growing proximity to Sinn Féin's Phil Flynn and by his awareness of Umkhonto we Sizwe training arrangements, as well as by sustained intimidation his family experienced from republican paramilitaries during his tenure as Minister for Health.

The Irish Times sided editorially with the IAAM, arguing that Sinn Féin's membership did not imply endorsement of its policies. The IAAM's Sinn Féin representative, Seán Marlow, resigned his own Executive Committee position shortly after the controversy became public, despite personal appeals from both Adams and Martin McGuinness that he remain.

== Dunnes Stores strike (1984 to 1987) ==
On 19 July 1984, days after the Sinn Féin controversy broke, 21-year-old cashier Mary Manning refused to check out South African Outspan grapefruit at the Dunnes Stores branch on Dublin's Henry Street, acting on a boycott resolution passed by her trade union, the Irish Distributive and Administrative Trade Union (IDATU). (Note: The instruction itself originated in a minor 1983 dispute in Limerick, when local IDATU official Brian Higgins discovered South African produce being sold at a Quinnsworth supermarket and subsequently drafted the boycott motion adopted at the union's 1984 Easter conference in Westport.) Manning and her shop steward, Karen Gearon, walked out along with most of the store's staff. 10 remained on the picket line, surviving on strike pay of £21 a week for two and a half years. A further striker, Brendan Barron, joined in October 1985 after refusing to handle South African goods at a separate Dunnes branch in Crumlin. The strikers initially faced public hostility and abuse, and gained little formal support from the wider trade union movement, but their cause gained wider sympathy after a December 1984 meeting in London with Archbishop Desmond Tutu, en route to collect his Nobel Peace Prize.

The IAAM's own response was ambivalent. Asmal and his wife joined the picket in its early weeks and welcomed the dispute as an opportunity the Movement had awaited for twenty years, but after negotiations between IDATU and Dunnes stalled that autumn, Asmal privately told the union in October 1984 that the strike had gone on long enough. Without his union's knowledge, Asmal also wrote directly to Dunnes managing director Ben Dunne that December, offering himself as a mediator. The strikers themselves came to regard the IAAM's largely middle-class Executive Committee with some wariness, referring privately to the "cheese and wine brigade", though the historian Connal Parr has noted that this criticism was not universally fair, as several individual members, notably Tony Ffrench, remained committed to the picket throughout its duration and repeatedly urged their colleagues to provide greater support. Tension between the strikers and ICTU general secretary Donal Nevin, who regarded boycotts as outside the tradition of the labour movement, became public in April 1985 through an article by journalist Eamonn McCann in Magill magazine, to which Asmal responded with a robust private defence of Nevin's record on the anti-apartheid cause. Bishop of Galway Eamon Casey publicly endorsed the boycott as a matter of individual conscience while privately urging IDATU to bring the strike to a close, a position the strikers compared unfavourably to Asmal's own equivocation.

In July 1985, a visit by the strikers to South Africa, made at the invitation of Archbishop Tutu against the IAAM's wishes, ended when they were detained on arrival in Johannesburg and deported. Following the intervention of Labour Minister Ruairí Quinn, picketing was suspended in December 1985, and in February 1986 the government announced that South African produce would be banned from import under an International Labour Organization clause covering goods made with prison labour, a restriction given full legal effect the following year. The legal route for the ban was identified by Paul Cullen, a special advisor in the Department of Labour, who located a provision within the General Agreement on Tariffs and Trade permitting a ban on goods produced using prison labour, overturning earlier legal advice that a ban would breach Ireland's international trade obligations. The measure ultimately passed cabinet by the deciding vote of Taoiseach Garret FitzGerald, against the objections of a majority of his own Fine Gael ministers.

10 strikers returned to work on 5 January 1987 after being offered new contracts, though Karen Gearon was dismissed the following year on grounds she successfully challenged before the Employment Appeals Tribunal, which awarded her £1,739 in compensation for unfair dismissal. Several of the strikers faced lasting financial hardship; Mary Manning emigrated to Australia in 1988 before returning to Ireland five years later, while others struggled to find employment owing to the strike's continuing stigma. The strikers were finally received by Mandela at the Berkeley Court Hotel in Dublin during his July 1990 visit, and three of them, including Gearon and Manning, travelled to attend Mandela's funeral in South Africa in December 2013.

== Namibia, Zimbabwe, and southern Africa ==
The IAAM took a sustained interest in other southern African liberation movements beyond South Africa itself, reflecting the ANC's own regional strategy. Following the Rhodesian Unilateral Declaration of Independence in 1965, the IAAM campaigned against trade with the minority regime of Ian Smith, while the movement developed a lasting preference for Joshua Nkomo's Zimbabwe African People's Union over Robert Mugabe's Zimbabwe African National Union, a preference that Kader Asmal made explicit by inviting Nkomo, but not Mugabe, to Dublin in 1974; Mugabe was reported to have remembered the slight on his own visit to Dublin following Zimbabwean independence in 1980. The IAAM supported Namibian independence throughout the 1970s and 1980s, and its members, including both Kader and Louise Asmal, attended the inauguration of Namibian president Sam Nujoma in March 1990 following the South West Africa People's Organisation's victory in the country's first free elections in November 1989. In the early 1990s the IAAM also monitored the Angolan Civil War and supported a United Nations arms embargo against the National Union for the Total Independence of Angola.

== Later years and dissolution ==
The government further curtailed South African trade during the 1980s, closing its Johannesburg tourist office in 1986 and halting the state Electricity Supply Board's purchases of South African coal. Following his release from prison in February 1990, Mandela visited Dublin that July, thanking the Dunnes strikers and the Irish people for what he described as their pioneering role in the anti-apartheid struggle. Dublin had already become the first capital city to grant Mandela its Freedom of the City in 1988. Mandela's public suggestion, made during the same visit, that the British government negotiate with the IRA without preconditions caused considerable controversy in the Irish press, with some, including Conor Cruise O'Brien, alleging that Asmal had influenced the remarks, an accusation Asmal denied. South African president F. W. de Klerk's one-day visit to Ireland in April 1991 was met by IAAM protests outside both the Taoiseach's office and the National Concert Hall, reflecting the movement's continued scepticism that his reforms matched the pace of change demanded by the ANC. The IAAM organised a Dublin tribute to assassinated ANC leader Chris Hani in April 1993, attended by government ministers, and marked the death of Oliver Tambo the following month.

The Asmals returned to South Africa in 1990 and 1991, where Kader Asmal joined the ANC's National Executive Committee and its constitutional negotiating team. Almost 120 Irish observers, including long-standing campaigners Garry Kilgallen, Declan Bree, Tony Gregory and Nora Owen, travelled to South Africa to monitor the country's first universal-suffrage election in April 1994, while a proxy polling station operated in Dublin's ATGWU hall on Middle Abbey Street. The IAAM wound itself up at an extraordinary general meeting in the Mansion House on 28 May 1994, addressed by Mendi Msimang, the ANC's chief representative to Ireland and Britain, following the 1994 South African general election, after which Mandela appointed Asmal to his cabinet as Minister for Water Affairs and Forestry. A message from the Asmals read at the closing meeting thanked members for "the unstinting warmth of your solidarity that gave us the strength to carry on".

== Legacy ==
Asmal died in Cape Town in June 2011. His memoir, completed by Louise Asmal after his death, first revealed the extent of the Movement's covert links to the IRA. The Dunnes Stores dispute has since eclipsed Asmal's own profile in popular memory of Irish anti-apartheid activism, and Mary Manning's 2017 memoir, Striking Back, was critical of what she saw as his reluctance to fully back the strikers. The IAAM's work has been marked by a 2013 exhibition at Dublin's City Hall, at which the South African ambassador estimated that some 10,000 Irish people had taken part in the campaign over its history, and by Together/Apart, a 2026 exhibition at the Little Museum of Dublin produced with the University of the Western Cape. A history of the Movement by academic Connal Parr, Solidarity and Pressure, was published by Oxford University Press in 2026.
