= A Simple Man =

A Simple Man may refer to:

- A Simple Man (book), written by Ronnie Kasrils on South African President Jacob Zuma
- The Measure of a Man (2015 film), a French drama film

== See also ==
- Simple Man (disambiguation)
