= Kasrils =

Kasrils is a surname. Notable people with the surname include:

- Eleanor Kasrils (1936–2009), Scottish-South African activist
- Ronnie Kasrils (born 1938), South African politician
