= List of people subject to banning orders under apartheid in South Africa =

South African government restrictions prior to 1990

This is a selection of people subject to a "banning order" by the apartheid-era South African government. Banning was a repressive and extrajudicial measure used by the South African apartheid regime (1948–1994) against its political opponents. The legislative authority for banning orders was firstly the Suppression of Communism Act, 1950, which defined virtually all opposition to the ruling National Party as communism. This was superseded by the Internal Security Act, 1982. The regime ceased to deploy bannings and lifted all remaining banning orders in 1990, in the run-up to the advent of democracy in South Africa in 1994.

A banning order entailed restrictions on where the banned person could live and who they could have contact with, required that they report weekly to a police station, and proscribed them from travelling outside a specific magisterial district. The banned person was prohibited from attending meetings of any kind, speaking in public, or publishing or distributing any written material. It proscribed broadcasters and the press from broadcasting, publishing or reporting the banned person's words. It thus mixed elements of exile, suppression orders and censorship. The prohibition on attending meetings meant that the banned person could not be with more than one other person at a time. The banned person was forbidden all contact with other banned persons and was forbidden to engage in any political activity. The penalty for violating a banning order was up to five years in prison.

== Some people subject to banning orders ==
Over 1600 people have been subjected to banning orders. Prominent among these are:

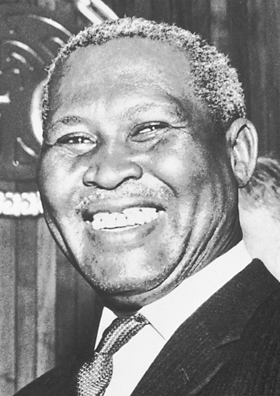
Albert Lutuli

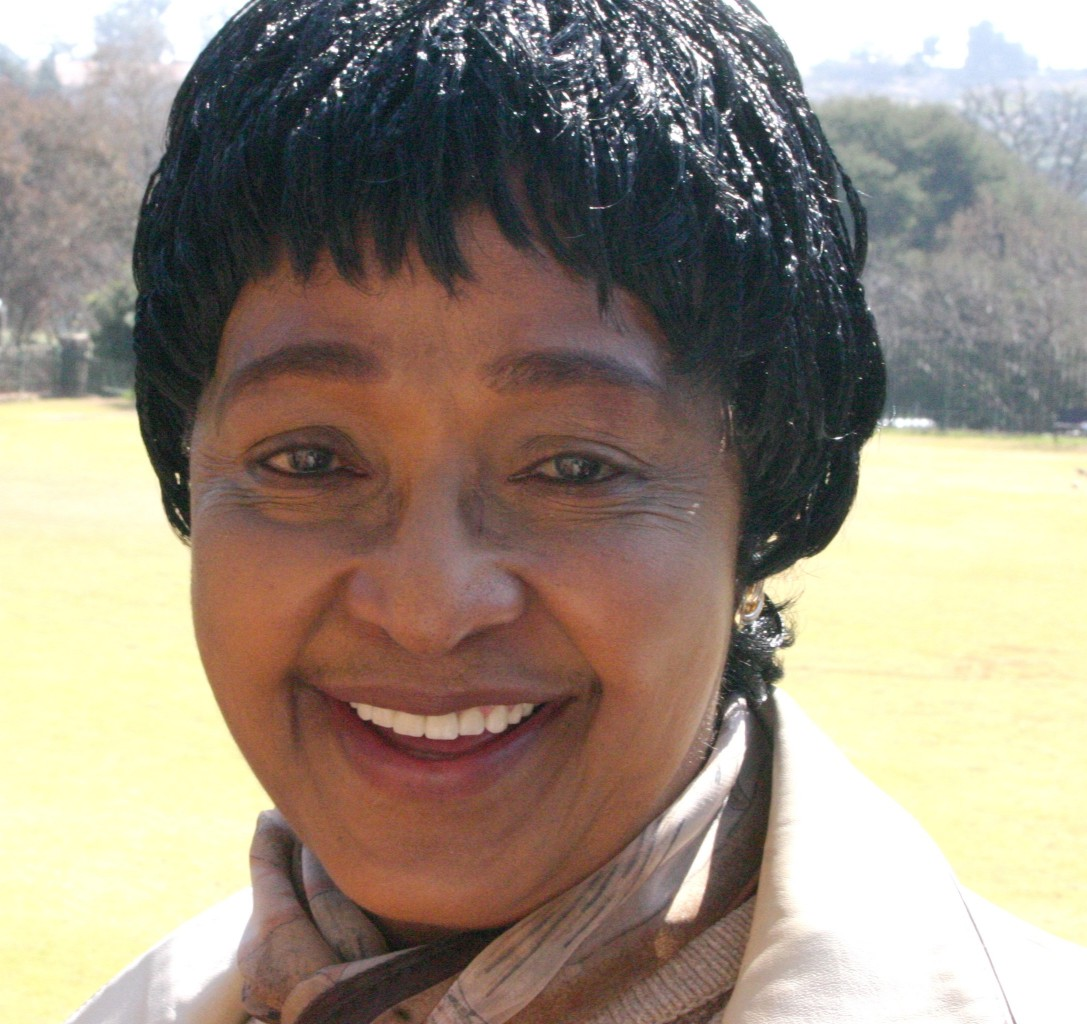
Winnie Madikizela-Mandela

- Eric Abraham: Banned for intended 5 years in 1976, fled to Botswana in 1977, granted political asylum in UK.
- John Aitchison: banned 1965–1970, 1971–1976.
- Phyllis Altman: Banned in 1964.
- Gavin Michael Andersson: Banned 1976 to 1981.
- Jacqueline Arenstein: Banned in 1963, 1973 and 1978.
- Farouk Asvat: banned 1973 to 1978.
- Mabel Balfour: Banned in 1963.
- Saul Bastomsky: Banned in 1965, emigrated to UK, 1966 to Australia
- Mary Benson: Banned in 1966.
- Jean Bernadt: Banned 1959 to 1964.
- Hilda Bernstein: Banned 1953 and 1958.
- Lionel Bernstein: Banned 1950 and 1953.
- Steve Biko: Banned February 1973 to 1977 (killed in police custody).
- Brian Brown: Banned 17 October 1977 for five years.
- Peter Brown at South African History Online
- Dennis Brutus: Banned for 5 years, October 1960.
- Neville Curtis (ex-president of NUSAS): Banned 27 February 1973; restrictions lifted 1976.
- Yusuf Dadoo: Banned 1953 until exile and death in 1983.
- Lionel Davis: Banned 1971 to 1976.
- Cosmas Desmond: Author of “The Discarded People” which exposed the sufferings of people who were forcibly moved from their homes.
- Patrick Duncan: Banned 1961, 1962; went into exile 1962
- Bettie du Toit: Banned in 1952.
- Paula Ensor (member of NUSAS): Banned 27 February 1973 to 31 March 1978. Left for Botswana clandestinely in 1976.
- Vic Finkelstein: Banned for five years in 1967 and emigrated to the UK in 1968.
- Ruth First: Banned 1960 to 1982 (killed in exile by police letter bomb).
- Ela Gandhi: Banned in 1975.
- Alcott 'Skei' Gwentshe: Banned November 1952; sentenced to 9 years in prison for violating the banning order, 26 March 1953.
- Bertha Gxowa: Banned in 1960.
- Adelaine Hain: Banned in 1963.
- Viola Hashe: Banned in 1963 until her death in 1977.
- Ruth Hayman: Banned from 1966 to 1981 (died in exile).
- Sedick Isaacs: Banned from 1977 to 1984.
- Helen Joseph: Banned four times, starting in 1957.
- Ronnie Kasrils: Banned 1962 to 1990.
- Clive Keegan (ex-vice-president of NUSAS): Banned 27 February 1973 for five years; left for Botswana clandestinely in 1976.
- Bennie Khoapa: Banned 1973 to 1978; went into exile 1978.
- Theo Kotze: Banned 17 October 1977 for five years.
- Sheila Barsel Lapinsky (general secretary of NUSAS): Banned 27 February 1973 to 31 March 1978. The only one of the group of NUSAS members banned on that date to serve her time in the country.
- Philippe Le Roux (NUSAS member): Banned 27 February 1973 for five years. Left the country on an exit permit.
- Norman Levy: Banned in 1964, left for UK in 1968.
- Petrus Willem Letlalo (founding member of the ANC): Banned 1960 to 1980, including under banning order number 1527. Died at the age of 99, after a debilitating stroke in 1981.
- Albert Lutuli: Banned 1952 to 1967.
- Winnie Madikizela-Mandela
- Elizabeth Mafekeng: Banned in 1959.
- Mac Maharaj: Banned on release from prison in 1976; went into exile in 1977.
- Trevor Manuel: Banned 1985 to 1986, banned again 1988.
- Todd Matshikiza
- Joe Matthews: Banned in 1953 (went into exile in 1960).
- Cedric Mayson: Banned 17 October 1977 for five years.
- Fatima Meer: Banned in 1952.
- Florence Mkhize: Banned in 1952.
- Mary Moodley: Banned in 1963.
- Kay Moonsamy: Banned in 1963.
- Josie Mpama: Banned in 1955.
- H. Selby Msimang: Banned in 1967.
- Shulamith Muller: Banned in 1962; went into exile in 1962 (died in exile in 1978).
- Beyers Naudé: Banned 1977 to 1984.
- Rita Ndzanga: Banned in 1964.
- J. B. Marks: Banned 1950 to 1972 (died in exile).
- Barney Pityana
- Paul Pretorius (NUSAS president): Banned from 27 February 1973 for five years, but his restrictions were lifted in 1976.
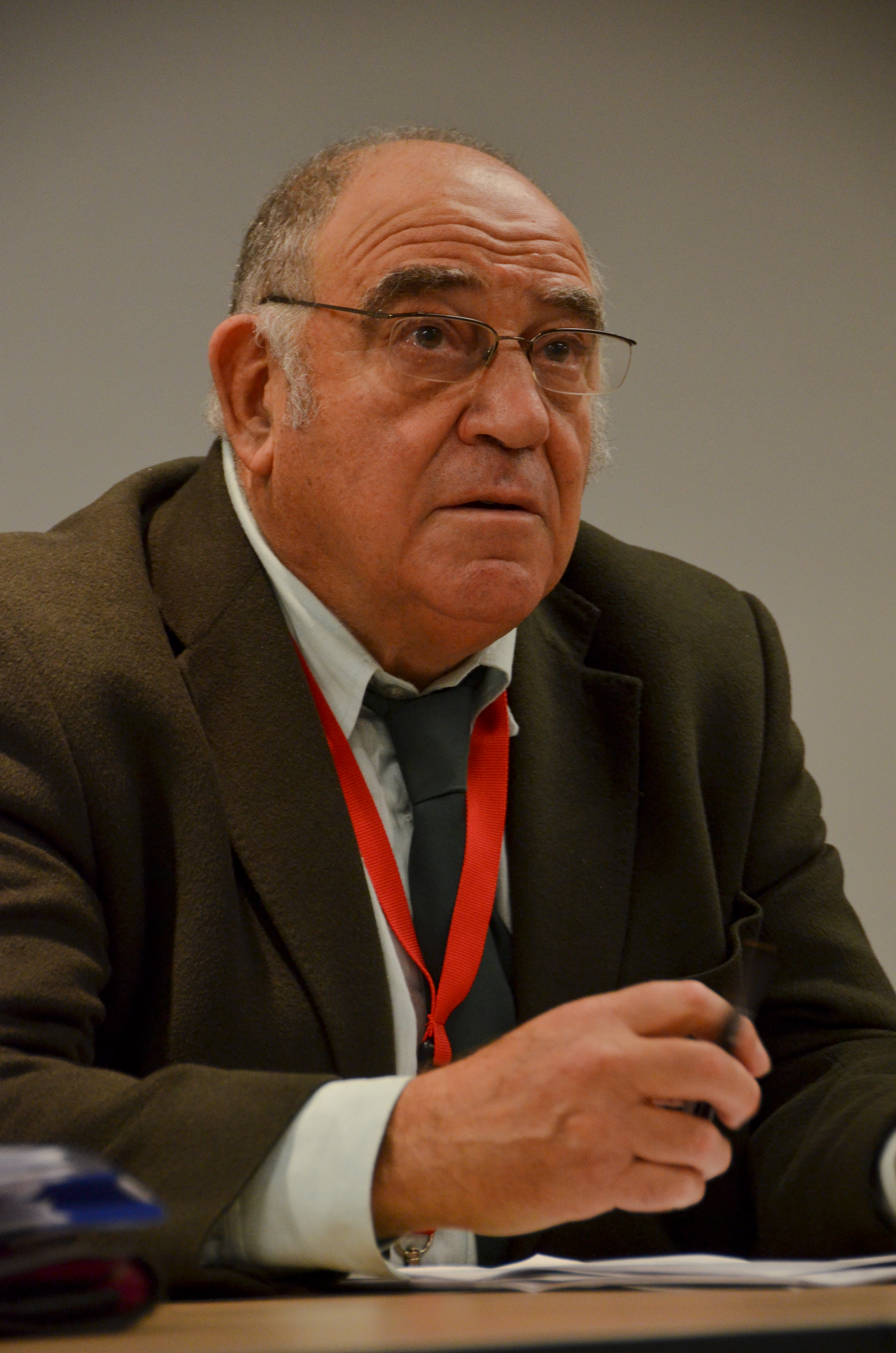
- Ronnie Kasrils
  Mamphela Ramphele: Banned 1977 to 1984.
- Peter Ralph Randall: Banned 17 October 1977 for five years.
- Robert Resha: Banned 1961 (died in exile in 1973).
- Ian Robertson (NUSAS president): Banned 1966 to 1971.
- Marius Schoon: Banned 1976 to 1990.
- Jeanette Schoon (née Curtis), former member of the South African Congress of Trade Unions (SACTU), wife of Marius Schoon and sister of Neville Curtis: Banned 1976 for five years. Murdered in exile in Angola by a letter bomb delivered by Craig Williamson, a spy for the security police, along with her six-year-old daughter Katryn.
- Dulcie September: Banned 1969 to 1973 (assassinated outside the ANC's Paris office in 1988).
- Annie Silinga
- Walter Sisulu: Banned 1955 to 1990.
- Robert Sobukwe: Banned 1969 to 1978.
- Barry Streek, withdrawn shortly after banning.
- Oliver Tambo: Banned 1959 to 1990.
- Rick Turner: Banned 27 February 1973, murdered 1978.
- Chris Wood: Banned 27 February 1973 (left for Botswana clandestinely in 1976).
- Dorothy Williams: Banned 1964 to 1969.
- Donald Woods: Banned 1977 to 1990 (fled South Africa on New Year's Eve 1977).

== See also ==
- Banned persons law
- House arrest
