= Bertha Gxowa =

South African activist and politician

- Born: 26 November 1934; Germiston, South Africa
- Died: 19 November 2010 (aged 75); Johannesburg, South Africa
- Citizenship: Germiston
- Occupation: Women's rights activist
- Title: Bertha Gxowa
- Spouse: Cecil Mntukanti Gxowa
- Children: 5

Bertha Gxowa, OLS, (née Mashaba; 26 November 1934 - 19 November 2010) was an anti-apartheid and women's rights activist and trade unionist in South Africa.

== Biography ==
Gxowa was born in Germiston. She first attended the Thokoza Primary School in that locality before moving on to the Public Secondary School. She was sent to a commercial college, where she completed her shorthand and bookkeeping courses.

== Career ==
Gxowa started working as an office assistant in the South African Clothing Workers' Union where she engaged in wage negotiations and gathered factory subscriptions. Gxowa became involved in the African National Congress's (ANC) Youth League and the Women's League at a young age. She first signed up with ANC during the anti-Bantu education campaign.

== Achievement ==
Gxowa took part in the Defiance Campaign in 1952. Gxowa was one of the founding members of the Federation of South African Women (FEDSAW) . She also was one of the organizers for the Women's March on the Union Building in 1956 which protested pass laws. Gxowa, along with Helen Joseph, traveled across South Africa to collect signatures on 20,000 petitions which were presented at the march.

She was eventually accused of treason in 1956 in the Treason Trial and remained on trial until 1959. She was banned under the Suppression of Communism Act in 1960.

In 1994, she began to serve in Parliament as an ANC member. She was a member of the Home Affairs and Health Parliamentary Portfolio Committees in Parliament until 2004.

== Personal life and death ==
Gxowa died in a hospital in Johannesburg on 19 November 2010. A hospital in Gauteng Province is named after her. She had five children and was married to Cecil Mntukanti Gxowa, who had died before her. Her grave site has been dedicated as a provincial heritage site.

== See also ==
- List of people subject to banning orders under apartheid
