= Freda Levson =

South African political activist

Winifred "Freda" May Levson (born MacDonald Troup 21 November 1911 - 7 October 2004) was a South African activist. Levson fought against apartheid throughout her life. Her 1950 book, In Face of Fear: Michael Scott's Challenge to South Africa, brought public attention to the issues of racial segregation in Africa and also to the work of Reverend Michael Scott.

== Biography ==
Levson was born in Pretoria on 21 November 1911. Until she was 13, she attended school in England and spent her holidays in Scotland. She went on to study geography at St Hugh's College. During World War II, she volunteered on a ship that took evacuee children to South Africa and afterwards, she stayed there with her family.

Levson worked with Reverend Michael Scott in 1946 on the plight of Namibians and other related liberation campaigns. Levson felt that the plight of Hereros people in Namibia was a "test case" for racial segregation. In 1948, she took Scott's notes from the United Nations and used these to publish a book, In Face of Fear: Michael Scott's Challenge to South Africa (1950). The book includes historical perspective and attention to detail about Scott's work according to The Age. However, in a review in The Observer, Margery Perham wrote that the book "lacks balance, continuity and exactitude." The book did bring public attention to the issue.

Levson married Leon Levson in the early 1950s and the couple moved to Johannesburg. She was involved in the launch of the 1952 defiance campaign against unjust laws led by the African National Congress (ANC) and the South African Indian Congress (SAIC). Levson, spent four weeks in jail, along with Bettie du Toit, for her participation. Both women were fined as well.

Levson helped maintain the funds of the South African Treason Trial Defence fund which helped support legal fees for those accused during the 1956 Treason Trial. Levson also began to work with Congress Alliance in exile and worked for the International Defence and Aid Fund (IDAF). She worked as IDAF secretary until 1961, when her husband became ill.

Briefly, she and her husband moved to Malta for his health, but Leon Levson died that same year. Levson moved to London and met Nelson Mandela there in 1962.

In 1963, she started a boycott movement called Playwrights Against Apartheid which encouraged writers to "withdraw rights to have their works performed in racially segregated theatres in South Africa." Samuel Beckett was involved and Waiting for Godot was not performed again in South Africa until 1976 when it starred an all-black cast as Market Theatre, Johannesburg. Between 1980 and 1985, she served on the council of IDAF.

When apartheid was ended, Levson donated her papers to Fort Hare University. She received a telegram from Mandela on her 90th birthday, where he wrote that he would always remember her efforts to fight apartheid. Levson died on 7 October 2004.

== Selected bibliography ==
- In Face of Fear: Michael Scott's Challenge to South Africa. London: Faber and Faber. 1950. OCLC 906063325.
- South Africa: An Historical Introduction. Harmondsworth: Penguin Books. 1975. OCLC 603720402.
- Forbidden Pastures: Education Under Apartheid. London: International Defence and Aid Fund. 1977. ISBN 9780904759105.
