= Phyllis Altman =

Anti-apartheid activist (1919– 1999)

- Born: Phyllis Miriam Sachs; September 25, 1919
- Died: September 18, 1999 (aged 79); London, England
- Citizenship: South African
- Education: University of the Witwatersrand
- Occupations: Trade unionist; activist; writer
- Organizations: South African Congress of Trade Unions; International Defence and Aid Fund
- Notable work: The Law of the Vultures (1952)
- Spouse: Ray Altman

Phyllis Altman (25 September 1919 – 18 September 1999) was a trade unionist and anti-apartheid activist in South Africa. Altman was an employee of the South African Congress of Trade Unions (SACTU). She was also the general secretary of the International Defence and Aid Fund (IDAF), and a fiction writer.

== Biography ==
Phyllis Miriam Altman (née Sachs), was the daughter of Lithuanian-Jewish émigrés, Morris and Beile Sachs. She attended Jeppe High School for Girls. Altman, like other girls at her high school, sewed "for the poor Blacks" on Thursdays. Altman attended the University of Witwatersrand on a loan from the Transvaal Education Department that stipulated she teach after graduation. During her time at university, she took part in student demonstrations protesting the "Greyshirts and the bulldozing of Sophiatown." She earned an undergraduate degree and then finished an Honours degree in History before spending a year at the Teachers' Training College in Johannesburg. She was almost expelled from the Teachers' Training College because of her activism, but she graduated and spent three years teaching at "all White schools." After teaching, she started working for the anti-fascist Springbok Legion. In the Springbok Legion, she helped support ex-servicemen of color, where she was able to see the "disastrous effects of the Apartheid system on African men."

For three years, Altman and her husband Ray Altman, a South African trade unionist, lived in London. In 1952, she published The Law of the Vultures. The book was based on her experience working with the Springbok Legion. Not long after its publication and good critical reception internationally, a professor at the University of Witwatersrand called the book "subversive," which caused many booksellers to return copies of the book.

Altman joined the South African Congress of Trade Unions (SACTU) in 1956 and quickly became very involved with the organization. Altman was the only full-time paid employee of SACTU between 1956 and 1963, where she worked as Assistant General Secretary. During this time, she kept in contact with South African unions and international unions, both. Her distribution of materials to libraries and trade unions around the world enabled the preservation of primary materials relating to SACTU. Altman represented SACTU at the Fourth Congress of the World Federation of Trade Unions (WFTU) in 1957. During government sweeps in 1960, resulting in people becoming "emergency detainees," Altman took refuge in Swaziland. She was banned in 1964 under the Suppression of Communism Act which prevented her from teaching and working with the unions. She left South Africa in 1964. Altman still helped SACTU, remotely, operating with others out of London.

When Solly Sachs left the International Defence and Aid Fund (IDAF) in 1967, John Collins hired Altman to be in charge of administrative affairs. Altman was the general secretary of what was known as Programme 1, which helped secretly channel funds to defence lawyers in South Africa. She was very secretive about the system, using a secret code with her contacts and a system that was difficult to crack. Altman was also able to successfully deflect attempts by the South African spy Craig Williamson to infiltrate IDAF.

Altman also edited books for IDAF under the Kliptown Books name. Collins died in 1982, and Altman stayed afterwards long enough to ensure that the reorganization was "firmly established," and then retired.

Altman was also involved in a programme that educated "Rhodesian blacks interned in camps." Half of the cabinet of Robert Mugabe had degrees they had earned with Altman's help.

Altman's role in working with IDAF became known after the release of Nelson Mandela. Altman died on 18 September 1999 in London.

== Bibliography ==
- The Law Of The Vultures (1952)
- Come Back, Africa! Fourteen Short Stories from South Africa (1968)

== See also ==
- List of people subject to banning orders under apartheid
