= Mary Benson (campaigner) =

South African activist and author (1919–2000)

Dorothy Mary Benson
- Born: Dorothy Mary Benson; 8 December 1919; Pretoria, South Africa
- Died: 19 June 2000 (aged 80); London, United Kingdom
- Occupations: Writer and anti-apartheid activist
- Writing career
- Language: English
- Subjects: Apartheid, Internal resistance to apartheid, African National Congress, Nelson Mandela, Albert Lutuli, Athol Fugard, Barney Simon

Dorothy Mary Benson (8 December 1919 – 19 June 2000) was a South African civil rights campaigner and author.

== Early life ==
Born in 1919 in Pretoria, Benson served in the South African Women's Army during World War II. After the war, she was secretary to film director David Lean.

== Activism and writing ==
Benson became acquainted with the author Alan Paton, and read his novel Cry, the Beloved Country (1948), the main theme of which was racial discrimination in South Africa. This affected her greatly, and she became a campaigner for the rights of black South Africans.

She worked with Michael Scott (who, in 1946, was the first white man to be jailed for resisting South Africa's racial laws), becoming his secretary in 1950. With Scott, Benson helped to found the African Bureau.

In 1957, Benson was appointed secretary to the Treason Trial Defence Fund. In 1961, Benson took on another secretarial role, moving to Natal to assist Chief Albert Lutuli when he was awarded the Nobel Peace Prize.

Through all this work, Benson became familiar with the African National Congress (ANC). She assisted Nelson Mandela's escape from South Africa in 1962, and interviewed several prominent figures in the ANC, including Walter Sisulu and James Calata. Based upon these experiences, she wrote the first general history of the ANC: The African Patriots (London: Faber & Faber, 1964).

She testified to the United Nations Committee on Apartheid in 1963, and was the first South African to do so. She was placed under house arrest and "banned" in 1966. She subsequently left the country and lived in exile, settling in London, England.

Benson's biography of Nelson Mandela, Nelson Mandela: the Man and the Movement (1986), was the second biography of Nelson Mandela to be written. It was banned in apartheid South African upon its publication.

== Later life and death ==
Benson was close friends with the playwright Athol Fugard. She edited his Notebooks 1960–1977 (Faber and Faber, 1983) and wrote Athol Fugard and Barney Simon: Bare Stage, a Few Props, Great Theater (Ravan Press, 1997).

She appeared as a castaway on the BBC Radio programme Desert Island Discs on 16 February 1997.

A few months prior to Benson's death, Nelson Mandela visited her at her flat in London.

Benson died on 19 June 2000. Her papers, including correspondence with Semane Molotlegi and those relating to her biography of Tshekedi Khama, are archived in the Bodleian Library of Commonwealth and African Studies at Oxford. Other papers, including material relating to her biography of Nelson Mandela and correspondence with fellow anti-apartheid activists, forms part of the Institute of Commonwealth Studies archive collections held at Senate House Library.

== Publications ==
- The Tragedy of Apartheid. Christian Action. 1958.
- The Badge of Slavery (The pass laws of South Africa). Christian Action. 1960.
- Tshekedi Khama. Faber and Faber. 1960.
- Chief Albert Lutuli of South Africa. Oxford University Press. 1963.
- African Patriots. The story of the African National Congress of South Africa. Faber and Faber. 1963.
- South Africa: The Struggle for a Birthright. Penguin, Harmondsworth. 1966.
- At The Still Point. Gambit, Boston, USA. 1969.
- Nelson Mandela: The man and the movement. W.W. Norton & Co. 1986. ISBN 978-0393022964.
- A Far Cry: The Making of a South African. Viking, London. 1989.
- Athol Fugard and Barney Simon: Bare Stage, a Few Props, Great Theatre. Ravan Press, Randburg, South Africa. 1997.

== See also ==
- List of people subject to banning orders under apartheid
- The papers of Mary Benson are held by SOAS Archives
- Louise Bethlehem (2019) "Stenographic fictions: Mary Benson’s At the Still Point and the South African political trial," Safundi, 20:2, 193-212. https://www.tandfonline.com/doi/full/10.1080/17533171.2019.1576963
