= Bettie du Toit =

South African trade unionist and anti-apartheid activist

Bettie du Toit OLS

Personal details
- Born: Elizabeth Sophia Honman; July 15, 1910 Transvaal Province, Union of South Africa
- Died: January 31, 2002 (aged 91) Johannesburg, South Africa
- Occupation: Trade unionist, anti-apartheid activist

Bettie du Toit OLS (also Elizabeth Sophia Honman, born July 15, 1910, in Transvaal Province, Union of South Africa, died January 31, 2002, in Johannesburg, South Africa) was a trade unionist and anti-apartheid activist in South Africa.

== Biography ==
Du Toit was born in the former Transvaal Province on a farm, where she had one elder brother, though both children were virtually orphaned by the age of three as their mother died in 1912 in childbirth, and their father served with the South African Forces in France during World War I where he was severely shell shocked. Both children attended St. Ursula's Convent Boarding School in Krugersdorp from 1915 to 1919. After the war the family went to stay with relatives who were farming in Rhodesia.

When Du Toit was eighteen, she moved to Johannesburg where she began to work with trade unionist Johanna Cornelius. She was assigned a textile factory where she would organize workers for striking. The owner of the factory was Jewish and appreciated Du Toit's "anti-racist and anti-Nazi sensibilities." During a textile worker's strike in the late 1920s, she was arrested and was fined "one pound or 10 days labour." This incident made her more committed to striving for workers' rights. In 1936 she joined the South African Communist Party and went to the USSR to study, returning in December 1937.

At that time, she married Jan van Rooyen and adopted the name Bettie du Toit. The marriage was short-lived as they were divorced in 1939.

In 1938, Du Toit went to Cape Town and the town of Huguenot to organize three textile factories that employed white women and black men working together. During her time there, she attempted to form a union committee which had an equal number of white and black representatives. Later, when she danced with the black union chairperson at a fundraising dance, many of the white union members resigned. She managed to rebuild the union, but it was never as strong after that.

In 1942 she married for the second time to Guy Routh who was also a Communist and who flew seaplanes during World War II. This marriage also ended in divorce in 1946. He went on to become an important figure in the formation of the British Anti-Apartheid Movement. In 1947 she married for the third time to Yusuf Cachalia in Port Elizabeth, one of the last places to allow "mixed marriages". Du Toit met Nadine Gordimer in the 1950s and they became friends. Du Toit also worked as an activist. She protested the Asiatic Land Tenure Act and took part in the Defiance Campaign. She joined on December 6, 1952. On the day of the protest in Johannesburg, December 8, Du Toit ensured that she and others were arrested (which was part of the goal). She was later fined 50 pounds or fifty days with compulsory labour and she was jailed with Freda Troup for 25 days.

Her participation in that campaign caused her in 1952 to be banned for life from participating in trade unions under the Suppression of Communism Act. Du Toit began writing a book about the trade unions and worker's rights in a book called Ukubamba Amadolo (Go Slow). She founded an organization to promote the welfare of people in Soweto called Kupugani. Kupugani provided food to people in the black ghettoes, and it was against the law for her to be there. She would travel to and from Soweto, wearing a disguise at night until she was discovered by the police. In 1960, she was arrested. In fear that she would be jailed long-term, she went into exile in 1963 to London.

She was smuggled out of the country by friends of Gordimer who were Indian. Du Toit got stranded in Dar es Salaam, where Gordimer visited her and helped her get to Ghana. In Ghana, Du Toit worked with trade unions and for the Ghana Broadcasting Association, and enjoyed being able to swim in the ocean. She contracted Stevens-Johnson syndrome from polluted water and was not treated properly in the hospital. She went blind and Gordimer appealed to have her brought to London where she lived with the help of Freda Levson, who had helped hide Nelson Mandela. She taught herself Braille and then taught Braille to others. Eventually, in 1993 she was able to move back to South Africa where she was reunited with her brother, whom she had not seen for 50 years. She died in Johannesburg in 2002.

Du Toit was reported by her friend, Gordimer, to have "met death without any religious beliefs of another life, as she had taken on, and lived to the full deprivation and danger, the life of a revolutionary for freedom." In 2012, Du Toit was posthumously awarded the Order of Luthuli in Silver under the name Elizabeth Sophia Honman.

== Personal life ==
Du Toit openly defied the Immorality Act, living with her forbidden husband, who was black. They maintained the fiction that he was her gardener.

== See also ==
- List of people subject to banning orders under apartheid
