= Diana Collins =

Dame Diana Collins DBE
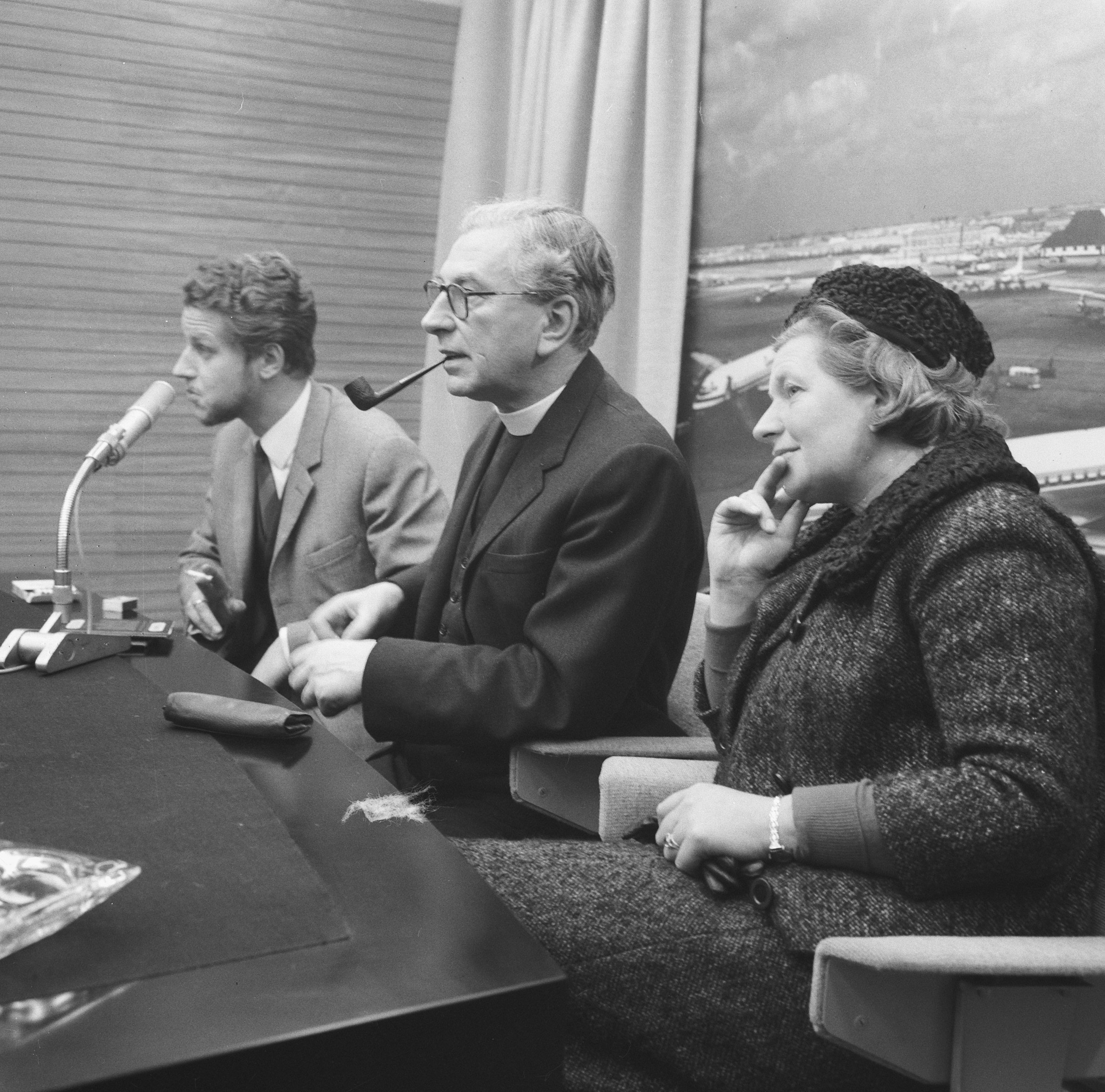
- Born: Diana Clavering Elliot; 13 August 1917; Stutton, Suffolk, England
- Died: 23 May 2003 (aged 85)
- Education: Lady Margaret Hall, Oxford
- Spouse: John Collins (m. 1939; died 1982)
- Children: Four, including Sir Andrew Collins

Dame Diana Clavering Collins DBE (née Elliot; 13 August 1917 – 23 May 2003) was an English activist and the wife of John Collins, a fiery canon of St Paul's Cathedral who earned an international reputation for his leadership of the Campaign for Nuclear Disarmament and the British campaign against apartheid in South Africa. She was his partner in these enterprises and in other activities.

She was born at Stutton Hall, Suffolk. She gave up reading English at Lady Margaret Hall, Oxford, to marry Collins, then Dean of Oriel College and later Chairman of the Campaign for Nuclear Disarmament.

== Years of activism ==
In 1940, her husband joined the RAF as a chaplain. In 1946 the Collins' convened a public meeting at Oxford Town Hall, calling for Christians to involve themselves in social and political action. This led directly to the formation of Christian Action, with John Collins as the chairman. Diana Collins edited Christian Action's journal.

The Collins' friends included Sir Stafford Cripps, Bishop Trevor Huddleston, the Lord Chancellor, Gerald Gardiner, Victor Gollancz, J.B. Priestley, Jacquetta Hawkes, Bertrand Russell and Oliver Tambo. All were active in the anti-capital punishment, anti-nuclear proliferation, anti-apartheid and other progressive causes. They launched the Defence and Aid Fund to support black South Africans. Diana Collins travelled incognito to South Africa when her husband was banned from entering that country. The Collins' raised large sums of money for the legal defense of their causes by the best barristers, including the defence of Nelson Mandela at the Rivonia trial.

Following her husband's death in 1982, Collins became a trustee of the International Defence and Aid Fund for Southern Africa until 1991, and remained on the Council of Christian Action.

== Writings ==
She wrote an account of her marriage, Partners in Protest. She also wrote Time and the Priestleys (1994), an account of her friends, author J.B. Priestley and his wife.

== DBE and death ==
Diana Collins was appointed DBE in 1999 "for services to human rights in Southern Africa". She died, aged 85 in 2003, and was survived by three sons, including the judge Sir Andrew Collins. One son predeceased her.

== Quotations ==
- "I would rather be married to the Chairman of CND than to the Archbishop of Canterbury".

== Link ==
- Obituary in The Telegraph Online
- Obituary in The Independent Online
