= Alcott Skei Gwentshe =

South African anti-Apartheid activist (d. 1996)

Alcott Skwenene Gwentshe
- Born: Alcott Skwenene Gwentshe; 1914; Tsomo, Eastern Cape, Republic of South Africa
- Died: 27 October 1966; Tsomo village, Eastern Cape
- Other name: Skei
- Occupations: Shopkeeper, political activist, musician
- Known for: Political activism
- Political party: African National Congress
- Board member of: African National Congress Youth League (ANCYL) branch in East London
- Partner: Irene Ngcebetsha-Gwentshe
- Children: Zweliyazuza 'Duke' Gwentshe, Zwelbanzi 'Boyce' Gwentshe and Mzimkulu Gwentshe

Alcott Skwenene 'Skei' Gwentshe (1914 – 27 October 1966) was a shopkeeper, musician and political activist who helped establish an African National Congress Youth League (ANCYL) branch in East London. He was among the political activists banished under the Native Administration Act of the South African Apartheid government.

== Political activity ==
Gwentshe first attended ANC meetings in 1948 at towns on the Eastern Cape that resulted in his being placed under watch by the security police. Documentation by the security police led to his banishment. Gwentshe noted at a meeting in Queenstown, 'I appeal to the African as individuals, teachers, preachers, policeman and the C.I.D to prepare for the struggle in the near future. I also appeal to these present to defy the laws, i.e. Pass Laws, and if arrested, not pay their fines.'

Gwentshe played a significant role in the establishment of the African National Congress Youth League in East London in 1949. He also organised the East London 'stay-at-home' of 26 June 1950 as well as the 1952 Defiance Campaign. He was the chairperson of the ANC in East London and also the president of the Cape ANC Youth League. He was a powerful and charismatic leader, making East London one of the most prominent centers of protest during the Defiance Campaign.

Gwentshe secured permission for a 'prayer meeting' under the Suppression of Communism Act and Riotous Assemblies Act for just over 50 Eastern Cape leaders. The meeting was scheduled for November 9, 1952 where leaders were to discuss the Port Elizabeth and Kimberly riots. The police discovered that the meeting was not of a religious nature and ordered the dispersion of 1500 in attendance. The police opened fire with stun grenades, revolvers and rifles when the crowds did not disperse. Nine people were killed including two white police officials. Numerous buildings, buses and churches were burnt. Numerous arrests and two hangings resulted from this incident. After the riots, police raided the 'locations', segregated urban areas for black people, to check that people had their pass books. As a result, hundreds of women and children fled East London to the rural reserves as they were living there illegally.

After Gwentshe's 'prayer meeting', he was banned under the Suppression of Communism Act from attending meetings of any sort for six months. He was found guilty of violating the banning order on March 26, 1953, and sentenced to nine years imprisonment. After his release, he attended a Liberal Party meeting in February, 1954 where he advocated that black people have direct positions on the municipal bodies. The East London municipality then urged the government to banish Gwentshe. He was banished from the Duncan village in the Red Location (township), to Maviljan Farm in Pilgrims Rest in the Eastern Transvaal. Gwentshe and Joel Lengesi became the first people banished from East London in 1954.

Upon arrival in Pilgrims Rest, Gwentshe declined the employment he had been offered. The government believed that he was being visited by and receiving financial support from the ANC. Because his home was in an urban area, the government decided to move him to a rural area to have better monitor his actions. In April 1955, he was banished to the Native Trust Farm Frenchdale, located in what is now known as Mafikeng, in the North West province. In 1956, he was arrested in Mafikeng for disobeying the order of the Governor-General to remain on the farm Frenchdale as he was alleged to be living in Mafikeng location. He was released on bail of £25 and with representation by lawyer Joe Slovo, he was found not guilty of contravening his banishment order.

In August 1956, Can Themba, writer and editor of 'Drum' magazine, released an exposé on the Frenchdale 'concentration camp,' titled 'Banned to the bush.' The exposé focused extensively on Gwentshe. In 1957, he was permitted to return to his home village, Tsomo, in the Transkei, now Eastern Cape province. His banishment order was revoked in June 1960.

The withdrawal document of his banishment was written in Afrikaans, bearing the signatures of then president CR Swart, Prime Minister HF Verwoerd, and Minister MDC de Wet Nel. The document noted that despite accusations of misconduct, no evidence was found. The Police Commissioner did not object to his return.

Gwentshe died on the 27th of October 1966 of unknown causes in the Eastern Cape. Documentation by the Truth and Reconciliation Commission noted that family members believed Gwentshe was poisoned by members of the security branch two years after his detention.

== Personal life ==
Gwentshe was orphaned during the Bulhoek massacre. Little is known of his early life except that he grew up in the Tsomo village in the Eastern Cape. He also enjoyed jazz music and was the leader of the Hot Shots Musical band in his youth.

Gwentshe married Irene Ngcebetsha-Gwentshe; nurse and songstress who was active in the struggle against Apartheid. They had four sons, Mzimkhulu Gwentshe, Mzwandile Zweliyazuza 'Duke' Gwentshe and Zwelbanzi 'Boyce' Gwentshe. They were also blessed with two daughters, Nomonde Gwentshe and Zukiswa Gwentshe. Gwentshe’s sons also grew into politics, Mzwandile Gwentshe, his eldest son died in the military in Tanzania, 1979. Mzimkhulu was exiled in Lesotho, he was a lawyer. Boyce was part of the Bhisho Massacre. Gwentshe taught Duke to play the saxophone at an early age. The sons, Boyce and Duke died within a week of each other in February 2008 and had a joint funeral service.

== See also ==
- Benjamin Pogrund, Sobukwe's biographer, who wrote, How Can Man Die Better: The Life of Robert Sobukwe.
- List of people subject to banning orders under apartheid
