= Jeanette Schoon =

Anti-apartheid activist (1949–1984)

Jeanette Schoon OLS
- Born: Jeanette Eva Curtis; 1949; Cape Town, Cape Province; Union of South Africa
- Died: 28 June 1984 (aged 35); Lubango, Angola
- Cause of death: Letter bomb
- Political party: African National Congress
- Spouse: Marius Schoon (m. 1977)
- Children: Katryn and Fritz
- Relatives: Neville Curtis (brother)

Jeanette Eva Schoon (née Curtis; 1949 – 28 June 1984) was a South African anti-apartheid activist. She and her daughter, Katryn Schoon, were killed by letter bomb in June 1984 in an operation carried out by the Security Branch of the South African Police.

Formerly a student and labour activist and later a member of the African National Congress, Schoon was banned between 1976 and 1981. She went into exile in Botswana and Angola in 1977 with her husband, former political prisoner Marius Schoon. She was assassinated at her home in Lubango, Angola and police agent Craig Williamson was granted amnesty for orchestrating the attack.

== Early life and activism ==
Schoon was born in 1949 in Cape Town in the former Cape Province. She was elected as vice-president of the anti-apartheid National Union of South African Students in 1972, and she helped co-found the Western Province Workers' Advice Bureau, a forerunner of the General Workers' Union, in 1973. Her brother, Neville Curtis, was also a prominent student activist.

In 1974, Schoon moved to Johannesburg, where she was a founder of the Industrial Aid Society and a member of its executive committee. She also worked as an archivist for the South African Institute of Race Relations, collecting information about trade unions and trade unionists. Because of her activism, Schoon was arrested under Section 6 of the Terrorism Act in 1976. She was released without charge in November, after two months' detention, but was subjected to a five-year banning order which severely restricted her political activity.

Shortly after her release, she met Marius Schoon, another banned activist who had recently served a long prison sentence for a sabotage plot under the auspices of Umkhonto we Sizwe. Although their banning orders made it an offence for them to meet, they married secretly in 1977 in a friend's apartment in Johannesburg. Having been informed that Marius was due for rearrest, and under the guise of going for a "honeymoon picnic", they left the country the same night, crossing the border into Botswana.

== Exile ==
After leaving South Africa, the Schoons spent three years as secondary school teachers in Molepolole, Botswana. In September 1981 they were hired as co-directors of the Botswana branch of the International Voluntary Service, a British aid programme based in Gaborone. During this period, they continued their political activities underground as members of the African National Congress (ANC); Schoon was active in the Medu Art Ensemble. Schoon's husband later said that their ANC activities were strictly political and did not involve military planning; The couple also had two children, a daughter named Katryn and a son named Fritz.

In June 1983, the Schoons fled Botswana with their children, fearing an attack by South African security services. Schoon's husband later told Hilda Bernstein that the British High Commissioner, in mid-June, personally informed them of an assassination plot and advised them to leave the country. They moved to Lubango, Angola, where they both taught English at the University of Lubango.

== Assassination and aftermath ==
On 28 June 1984, Schoon and her six-year-old daughter were killed in a letter bomb at their home in Lubango when Schoon opened a package from an ANC colleague in Botswana. Schoon's husband was on a trip to the Angolan capital, Luanda, and her son survived the bombing. At the request of Schoon's parents, Jack and Joyce Curtis, Schoon's memorial took place in Johannesburg under Reverend Peter Storey of the Methodist Church of Southern Africa; Schoon's husband and son, still exiled, were unable to attend.

In the immediate aftermath of the bombing, Terror Lekota of the United Democratic Front told the press that "the black community will assume that the hand of the [South African] government is in this somewhere", a sentiment echoed by the ANC. In 1995, Craig Williamson, a former agent of the Security Branch of the South African Police, admitted responsibility for the attack in an interview with the Observer. He said that his unit had been instructed to construct the letter bomb in an intercepted package, which he insisted was addressed to Schoon's husband.

At the post-apartheid Truth and Reconciliation Commission, the Schoon family opposed Williamson's application for amnesty. Together with the family of Ruth First – who was killed by letter-bomb in similar circumstances in 1982 – the Schoons were represented by George Bizos, who argued, among other things, that Williamson had personal reason to resent the Schoons, who had suspected him of being a spy during his years undercover in NUSAS in the 1970s. However, Williamson was granted amnesty in June 2000, with the Truth and Reconciliation Commission finding that the murder was politically motivated.

== Honours ==
In April 2014, President Jacob Zuma awarded Schoon the Order of Luthuli in silver for "Her definitive contribution to the fight against apartheid."
