= Cosmas Desmond =

The Reverend Cosmas Desmond
- Born: 19 November 1935; East End, London, United Kingdom
- Died: March 31, 2012 (aged 76); Durban, South Africa
- Occupations: Catholic priest, author
- Known for: Opposition to forced removals in South Africa
- Spouse: Snoeks Desmond
- Children: 3 sons

Cosmas Desmond (19 November 1935 – 31 March 2012) was a Catholic priest, an activist and an author who lived in England and South Africa. He is particularly well known for his opposition to forced removals in South Africa under the system of apartheid.

== Family ==
Born Patrick Anthony Desmond, he was the seventh of eleven children to a family of Irish Catholics in London's East End. His father worked as a fumigator.

== Missionary Work ==
Desmond received scholarships from several Catholic schools and became a Franciscan missionary, travelling to South Africa at the age of 21. He was assigned to a mission in KwaZulu-Natal. There he witnessed a number of forced removals of black residents under the Group Areas Act, which sought to preserve racial segregation along geographic lines. In 1969, Desmond traveled to Johannesburg to speak out against the practice. In the city, he befriended a number of black militants, including Steve Biko.

== The Discarded People ==
In 1970, he published a book on forced removals under the titled The Discarded People. In its preface, British ambassador Hugh Foot, Baron Caradon described it as "an account of callous contempt for human suffering, the ugliness of systematic cruelty, and the self-righteousness of the oppressor" and a book that could change the course of history. The book triggered a wave of international attention to forced removals, including a documentary film titled Last Grave in Dimbaza.

The book was soon banned in South Africa, and Desmond himself was subject to house arrest under the Suppression of Communism Act. Amnesty International named him a prisoner of conscience. As the church hierarchy disapproved of his activism, Desmond resigned from the priesthood in 1973. He later married human rights activist Snoeks Desmond, with whom he had three sons, but remained a Catholic.

== Exile ==
He left South Africa in 1978 after the assassination of Richard Turner and returned to London where he worked for Amnesty International, heading its British section. After eighteen months, he was fired in a "power struggle" between volunteers and staff. He returned to South African in 1991 and in 1994 stood for parliament as a Pan Africanist Congress candidate, but was not elected.

== Return to South Africa ==
After the end of apartheid, Desmond continued to advocate for the welfare of the poor, arguing that apartheid had not truly ended but had "a makeover and bought some new clothes". He felt that the leaders of post-apartheid South Africa had betrayed the trust of the anti-apartheid movement, particularly by failing to redistribute land on a large scale. Late in life, he headed the human rights branch of the NGO Children First, editing the organization's journal.

In 2012, he died of Alzheimer's complications in Durban.
