= Sophia Williams-De Bruyn =

South African anti-Apartheid activist (born 1938)

- Born: 1938 (age 87–88); Villageboard, Port Elizabeth
- Known for: Anti-apartheid activist

Sophia Theresa Williams-de Bruyn (née Williams; born 1938) OMSS is a former South African anti-apartheid activist. She was the first recipient of the Women's Award for exceptional national service. She is the last living leader of the Women's March.

== Early life ==
Sophia Theresa Williams-De Bruyn was born in Villageboard, an area that was home to people of many different nationalities. She was the child of Frances Elizabeth and Henry Ernest Williams. She says that her mother's compassion for others helped her develop a sense of empathy.

When her father joined the army to fight in World War II, Sophia’s mother moved the family to a new housing development, specifically built for coloureds, called Schauder. She continued her education at Saint James Catholic School. She dropped out of school and started working in the textile industry. Workers in the Van Lane Textile factory asked her to help "solve their problems with factory bosses," and she eventually became the shop steward. She later became an executive member of the Textile Workers Union in Port Elizabeth.

== Political career ==
Williams-De Bruyn was a founding member of the South African Congress of Trade Unions (SACTU). After the government introduced the Population Registration Act in the 1950s, she was appointed as a full-time organizer of the Coloured People's Congress in Johannesburg.

On August 9, 1956, she led the march of 20 000 women on the Union Buildings of Pretoria along with Lilian Ngoyi, Rahima Moosa, Helen Joseph, Albertina Sisulu and Bertha Gxowa to protest the requirement that women carry pass books as part of the pass laws. Sophia was only 18 years old, making her the youngest of the four leaders. These women ducked through the guards at the doors to deliver their petitions outside the ministers’ doors. After the Coloured Population Act was passed, Williams-De Bruyn was assigned by the Coloured People's Congress to work with Shulamith Muller on issues relating to pass laws.

In 1959, she married Henry Benny Nato De Bruyn and they had three children. Her husband was also an activist in the liberation movement, and an Umkhonto we Sizwe soldier. Their home became a haven for other anti-apartheid activists such as Raymond Mhlaba, Elias Motsoaledi and Wilton Mkwayi.

By 1963, her husband was forced into exile in Lusaka, Zambia where he was appointed Chairman of the Regional Political Committee of the ANC. She joined him six years later and went on to complete her studies and obtain her teacher diploma by 1977, all while working as an administrator for the ANC in Lusaka. She was one of the founder members of the ANC education council formed in 1980. The council set the curriculum for the Solomon Mahlangu Freedom College. The college was established in 1978 by the exiled African National Congress (ANC) in Mazimbu, Tanzania.

She returned to South Africa with her husband after the ANC was unbanned Her husband served as South Africa’s ambassador to Jordan until he died in 1999. She was a member of the Commission of Gender Equality before joining the Gauteng Legislature in 2004 and becoming its deputy speaker from 2005 until 2009, before moving to national parliament.

== Legacy ==
She addressed a large crowd on the 60th-anniversary commemoration of the Women’s March in 1956 in Pretoria on August 9, 2016.

In 1999, Williams-De Bruyn was awarded the Ida Mntwana Award in Silver. In 2001, she was the first to be awarded the Women's Award for exceptional national service and in the same year received the Mahatma Gandhi Award.

She is currently a provincial legislator in Gauteng Province for the ANC.
