= Neville Curtis =

Neville Wilson Curtis (born South Africa 16 October 1947; died Tasmania on 15 February 2007) was an anti-apartheid activist and leader of the National Union of South African Students.

Curtis' parents John (Jack) and Joyce were active against apartheid as well. Joyce was involved in the Black Sash movement and his father Jack ran as a candidate for the Progressive Party, which campaigned against apartheid.

== Career ==
After being arrested for leading a march in 1968 to demand the release of people detained without trial, Neville Curtis became NUSAS Additional Deputy Vice President to fill a vacancy caused by the government's expulsion of the incumbent Deputy, Andrew Murray. Curtis then became NUSAS President for the next two years from 1969, leading its activity as an anti-apartheid organisation.

As a leader of NUSAS, and friend of Steve Biko, Curtis supported the 1969 creation of a separate South African Students' Organisation (SASO), a Black Consciousness Movement student grouping. In 1973 Curtis was banned by the apartheid government. In September 1974 he was charged with breaking the banning orders, and fled the country to Australia where he had family connections. He applied for political asylum and was granted permanent residency by the Whitlam Labor government.

In Australia, Curtis continued campaigning against apartheid. He went on a speaking tour for the Australian Union of Students across Australia, New Zealand and other countries. He also worked for Labor Party Senator Arthur Gietzelt.

In 1984, Curtis' sister Jeanette Schoon, who had fled South Africa also, was killed along with her six-year-old daughter Katryn by a letter bomb delivered by police spy Craig Williamson. The bomb was said by the bomber to have been intended for her husband, Marius Schoon, who, like her, was an African National Congress operative; it has never been established whether the bomb was addressed to him alone or to both of them.

Curtis settled in Tasmania in the 1980s where he became a supporter of independent MP Bob Brown and the group that became the Tasmanian Greens. After five independent Greens were elected to state parliament in 1989, Curtis set up the magazine Daily Planet that went on to become the official magazine of the Tasmanian Greens.

Curtis was a founding sponsor of the Australian newspaper Green Left Weekly in 1991.

Curtis died after a long illness at his home in White Beach, Tasmania on 15 February 2007.

== See also ==
- List of people subject to banning orders under apartheid
