= Marius Schoon =

Afrikaner anti-apartheid activist (1937–1999)

- Born: Louis Marius Schoon; 22 June 1937
- Died: 7 February 1999 (aged 61)
- Education: Jeppe High School for Boys
- Alma mater: Stellenbosch University; University of the Witwatersrand
- Spouses: Jeanette Schoon (m. 1977; died 1984) Sherry Mclean (m. 1986)
- Children: Katryn and Fritz

Louis Marius Schoon (22 June 1937 – 7 February 1999) was an Afrikaner anti-apartheid activist. Marius died from lung cancer, after a long call from Nelson Mandela, thanking him for his sacrifice against the struggle.

== Education ==
South African political activist and teacher Marius Schoon matriculated at Jeppe High School for Boys in Johannesburg in 1954, then studied at the Afrikaans University of Stellenbosch, before moving to the University of Witwatersrand in Johannesburg for his postgraduate studies. While there he became a member of the South African Congress of Democrats (SACOD) in association with the African National Congress (ANC).

== Political activity ==
In the early 1960s, Marius Schoon plotted to bomb the Hospital Hill Police Station in Johannesburg. His group included Mike Ngubeni and Raymond Thoms. An undercover police agent provocateur infiltrated Schoon's group and supplied them with a fake bomb with a view to entrapment. Schoon was arrested and sentenced to 12 years in Pretoria Local Prison. Schoon's first wife Diana committed suicide while Schoon was in prison. As an Afrikaner himself, Schoon was more hated than other anti-apartheid activists by the Afrikaner National Party government which had instituted the apartheid system. Authorities prevented him from attending Diana's funeral and from visiting their daughter Jane. Authorities released Schoon from prison in 1976 having served his full term without remission, with requirements to restrict his movements. Authorities declared Schoon a "banned" person, which meant he was prohibited from leaving home between 6 PM and 6 AM, and forbade him to teach or associate with other political activists.

== Exile and Assassination ==
In June 1977, Schoon married Jeanette Curtis, a banned student and trade union activist, the sister of Neville Curtis. The couple feared for their safety in South Africa and moved to Botswana, first to the capital Gaborone, then to Molepolole, teaching at Kgari Sechele Secondary School, and later back to Gaborone where they jointly ran the Botswana branch of the [International Voluntary Service], all the while continuing to work for the anti-apartheid movement. They had two children: Katryn (1978) and Fritz (1982). During this time, internally within the African National Congress, the Schoons broke Craig Williamson's cover. He was an English-speaking white apartheid government spy named later publicly confirmed as a highly successful infiltrator of the liberation movements. This allowed the ANC leadership to attempt to manipulate Williamson covertly for the movement's ends for a time. Later, following a warning from the United Kingdom's High Commissioner (ambassador) in Botswana that Marius was a target for assassination by the apartheid government security forces, the Schoon family moved to Angola via Lusaka, Zambia.

Both Marius and Jeanette Schoon worked as university lecturers with the ANC in Lubango, Angola. On 28 June 1984, while Schoon was away, Jeanette Schoon collected—either from their personal postbox or from the University mail office—and carried home a parcel bomb, which exploded on opening. It has not been established whether the bomb was addressed to Marius Schoon individually or to both the Schoons as a couple. The explosion killed her and their daughter Katryn. Their son Fritz, a toddler at the time, survived and was found wandering around the house. He never fully recovered from the trauma of seeing his mother and sister murdered before his eyes and developed epilepsy as a direct consequence. After the bombing, Schoon and son moved several times, first to Tanzania, then Zambia and eventually to Ireland.

In 1986, Schoon married Sherry Mclean. Schoon returned to South Africa in 1990 after the ban on anti-apartheid parties was lifted. He died on 7 February 1999 from lung cancer, aged 61.

== Truth and Reconciliation Commission ==
At the Truth and Reconciliation Commission Amnesty hearings, Craig Williamson admitted that as a security officer working for the apartheid government, he had sent the parcel bomb to Schoon's house in Angola and killed Schoon’s wife and daughter.

At the TRC, Williamson's bomb-maker, Jerry Raven, testified:

"I did not know who the letters were intended for. It was only after the death of Jeanette Schoon and her child and the congratulations from Mr Williamson, that I realised that they had been the targets for one of the devices I had manufactured. On questioning Williamson about the Schoon incident he said that the letter had been intended for Marius Schoon but it served the[m] right. He alleged that the Schoons had always used their daughter as their bomb disposal expert. On requesting clarification he said that whenever they received suspicious parcels they would throw them in the back yard and let the child play with them until such time they deemed it fit to open them."

Schoon filed a civil suit against Williamson, seeking damages for his son Fritz. However, the suit was suspended pending Williamson’s Amnesty hearing. Schoon testified at Williamson’s hearing and is remembered for his strong stance against amnesty for the killer. He favoured justice over the Truth and Reconciliation Commission’s call for forgiveness, reconciliation and an amnesty. Williamson was granted amnesty in June 2000, a year after Schoon’s death, a decision his son appealed.

== See also ==
- List of people subject to banning orders under apartheid
