= Louise Asmal =

Louise Asmal (4 August 1938- 23 November 2024) was an English born civil rights activist, human rights campaigner, and respected writer and researcher. She co-founded the Irish Anti-Apartheid Movement alongside her South African born husband Kader Asmal in 1964 and played a key role in bringing to an end South Africa's apartheid regime.

== Early life ==
Born Mary Louise Parkinson near Birmingham, England to Roy and Phyllis Parkinson. She was educated at Stover School in Devon before graduating from University College London in 1956. Her first job was as an administrative secretary for the National Council for Civil Liberties in London. In the early 1960s she met her future husband Kader Asmal. He was originally from South Africa, but moved to London in 1959 to study.

== Activism ==
Louise and Kader met at an anti-apartheid fundraising party in London and married in 1961. They were barred from entering apartheid South Africa under the Prohibition of Mixed Marriages Act of 1949. The Act, which made it illegal for white people to marry people of other races, was one of the first pieces of discriminatory legislation passed during Apartheid. The Act was amended in 1968 to make provision for it to invalidate interracial marriages contracted in other countries.

They soon moved to Dublin, where they would live for 28 years. Along with her husband she worked hard to raise awareness of the South African apartheid regime, and this contributed to Ireland becoming the first western country to ban South African imports.

In 1964 the Irish Anti-Apartheid Movement was founded with both Louise and her husband playing a prominent role. Louise served as Honorary Secretary from 1965 to 1990. The Asmal home in Foxrock became a constant hive of activity. Louise claimed that the South African Bill of Rights was drafted in their home - with Kader writing in the kitchen, Albie Sachs writing in the dining room, and Louise herself typing up their writings in what was to become one of the seminal documents in the development of South Africa, one which was subsequently incorporated into the new South African Constitution.

== Later life ==
With the end of apartheid, Louise and Kader returned to Cape Town where in addition to her work as a writer, researcher, administrator and activist, Louise became a member of South Africa's Institute for Justice and Reconciliation. Her husband became the Education Minister.

Following her death in 2024 the Irish President Michael D. Higgins and the South African President Ramaphosa paid tribute to Louise for her contribution to the movement.
