= Shulamith Muller =

South African lawyer, communist, and anti-apartheid activist

Shulamith Muller (née Movshowitz, December 1922 - July 1978) was a South African lawyer, communist, and anti-apartheid activist. Muller was one of the attorneys for the 1956 Treason Trial.

== Biography ==
Muller was born in Pretoria in December 1922 to a Jewish family. Muller attended the University of Pretoria where she studied law and became an attorney in 1948. In her practice, she worked with Oliver Tambo, Nelson Mandela, Arthur Chaskalson and George Bizos. Muller allowed the South African Congress of Trade Unions (SACTU) to work secretly from her offices.

Muller worked as Viola Hashe's counsel in 1956 and prevented her from being deported. Muller also did appeals for Sophia Williams-De Bruyn. Muller was also involved with the 1956 Treason Trial as one of the instructing attorneys, taking the case on when she was seven months pregnant.

Muller was arrested during the post-Sharpeville Emergency and was jailed first at the Johannesburg Fort and later taken to the Pretoria Central Prison. In prison, she helped others with legal assistance. She was subject to bannings and harassment by the Special Branch so that she could no longer practice law effectively. In 1962, she and her family fled to Swaziland.

In August 1962, after she went to Swaziland, a gag order was imposed on her and 101 other South African activists, preventing the publishing of their spoken words and writings. South Africa struck her from the Roll of Attorneys in August 1971. She died in Swaziland in July 1978.

After being struck from the list of attorneys in South Africa for more than 30 years, Muller was finally posthumously reinstated by the Johannesburg High Court in 2005. Her son, Arnold, had petitioned for the reinstatement.

== See also ==
- List of people subject to banning orders under apartheid
