= Andrew Collins (judge) =

English barrister & judge (born 1942)

Sir Andrew David Collins (born 19 July 1942), styled The Hon. Mr Justice Collins, is a retired English barrister and judge. He served as a Justice of the High Court's Queen's Bench Division from 1994 until his 75th birthday in July 2017.

== Early life ==
The son of the Rev. Canon John Collins and of his wife Dame Diana Collins, he was educated at Eton College (where he was a contemporary of Prince Michael of Kent and Jonathan Aitken) and at King's College, Cambridge, graduating BA and MA.

== Career ==
Collins was called to the Bar from the Middle Temple in 1965 and became a Bencher of his inn in 1992. In 1985 he was appointed a Queen's Counsel and was a Recorder from 1986 until 1994, when he was appointed a Justice of the High Court and received a knighthood. He served as President of the Immigration Appeal Tribunal from 1999 to 2002 and was Lead Judge in the Administrative Court for England and Wales from 2004 to 2007.

== Notable cases ==
In 2005 Ken Livingstone, Mayor of London, refused to apologize for saying to an Evening Standard reporter "you might be Jewish, but actually you are just like a concentration camp guard". Complaints were made to the Standards Board for England and on 24 February 2006 the Adjudication Panel for England found Livingstone guilty of "bringing his office into disrepute" and suspended him from office for four weeks. The penalty was due to take effect on 1 March 2006, but Livingstone appealed to the High Court of Justice, which deferred the penalty pending the appeal, and on 5 October 2006 the matter came before Collins, who overturned the decision to suspend Livingstone, regardless of the outcome of his appeal. His final judgement some weeks later upheld Livingstone's appeal and stated that the Adjudication Panel had misdirected itself, finding that Livingstone had not brought his office into disrepute, quashed the suspension, and ordered the Standards Board to pay Livingstone's costs, estimated at £250,000. Collins found that the words "just like a concentration camp guard" were indefensible and considered that Livingstone should have apologised, but added that "Anyone is entitled to say what he likes of another provided he does not act unlawfully and so commits an offence under, for example, the Public Order Act. Surprising as it may perhaps appear to some, the right of freedom of speech does extend to abuse."

Also in 2005, Collins presided in the Divisional Court when it considered the case of R (Jackson) v Attorney General, a case which upheld the validity of the Parliament Act 1949 and consequently the use of the amended Parliament Act 1911 to pass the Hunting Act 2004 to limit fox hunting. The decision was upheld by both the Court of Appeal and the House of Lords.

In 2006 Collins reversed the General Medical Council verdict to strike off Professor Sir Roy Meadow. The satirical magazine Private Eye described his ruling as

a victory for common sense if you ignore the evidence, the context, Sir Roy's peculiar track record, the statistics, paediatrics, genetics and the presumption of innocence.

The GMC had invited Collins to recuse himself from the case in light of the fact that Collins's own brother, psychiatrist Dr Mark Collins, had been judged by the GMC for "crossing the patient–doctor boundaries". Collins saw no conflict and not only found in favour of Meadow but ruled to limit the power the GMC held over expert witnesses. The GMC appealed against his findings. Two of the three judges at appeal found that Meadow had been guilty of professional misconduct but only the senior of the three felt that it had been serious professional misconduct. The three judges reversed Collins's ruling that the expert medical witnesses should be immune to proceedings by the GMC.

On 2 June 2010, Forest Heath District Council's planning committee unanimously rejected plans by Edward Stanley, 19th Earl of Derby, to build more than 1,500 houses on a stud farm at Newmarket. Objectors had argued that the development was unnecessary, as there was already a good local supply of vacant houses, and that it endangered Newmarket's future as the centre of British horse racing. This was the first such local decision following the announcement of the abolition of Regional Spatial Strategies by the local government minister Eric Pickles. Lord Derby appealed against the rejection of his plans. A group of objectors, Save Historic Newmarket, then challenged the council's planning strategy in the High Court, arguing it was flawed, and on 25 March 2011 Collins quashed the entire strategy relating to Newmarket. He ordered the council and Lord Derby, who had been joined as a party, to pay 90 per cent of the other side's costs and also refused them leave to appeal.

== Private life ==
In 1970, Collins married Nicolette Anne Sandford-Saville, and they have one son and one daughter.
