= Jacqueline Arenstein =

South African anti-apartheid activist

- Born: 6 June 1921

Jacqueline Arenstein (born 6 June 1921) was a South African anti-apartheid activist. A member of the South African Communist Party (SACP) from the age of 21, she was a defendant in the 1956 Treason Trial and repeatedly banned from the 1960s through to the 1980s. In 1984 she was appointed as a legal adviser to Mangosuthu Buthelezi.

== Life ==
Arenstein is Jewish, and is a cousin to the former Minister of Intelligence Services Ronnie Kasrils.
