= Susie Figgis =

British casting director (1948–2025)

- Born: Susan Margaret Figgis; 24 March 1948; Nairobi, Kenya
- Died: 12 December 2025 (aged 77)
- Occupation: Casting director
- Spouse: Bill Anderson (m. 2000)
- Relatives: Mike Figgis (cousin)

Susan Margaret Figgis (24 March 1948 – 12 December 2025) was a British casting director and anti-apartheid supporter. She worked on numerous films including Harry Potter and the Philosopher's Stone, The Full Monty, and The Killing Fields.

== Life ==
Figgis was born in Nairobi to Shirley (née King) and Brian Figgis. Her father was a lawyer and her mother restored antiques. They moved to Britain when she was ten and she went to Wispers School. It was a boarding school where she was often punished and from which she was expelled more than once. She worked as an actor before she worked for the casting director Miriam Brickman, who was working on the 1977 Swedish film The Assignment.

She worked on numerous films including Harry Potter and the Philosopher's Stone, Gandhi, Bohemian Rhapsody, The Full Monty, and The Killing Fields.

As a casting director, she launched the careers of Lena Headey, Jodhi May, Greta Scacchi, Cathy Tyson, and Emily Woof, as well as Emma Watson who became Hermione Granger, and Rupert Grint who played Ron Weasley in the first Harry Potter film. She was also involved in the selection of Daniel Radcliffe as the leading character, although she had left the team that had auditioned 40,000 boys before Radcliffe was finally agreed upon for the leading role.

Figgis was a strong and silent supporter of the anti-apartheid movement after agreeing to a request from Eleanor Kasrils who was the ANC's President Oliver Tambo's assistant. Figgis provided funds, transferred confidential messages and provided a place to stay for supporters. In 1998, she met Bill Anderson that way and, two years later, he became her husband.

She died on 12 December 2025, at the age of 77.

== Select filmography ==
- Gandhi (1982)
- The Killing Fields (1984)
- Return to Oz (1985)
- The Mission
- Mona Lisa (1986)
- Cry Freedom (1987)
- The Crying Game (1992)
- Chaplin (1992)
- The Piano (1993)
- Interview with the Vampire (1994)
- Rob Roy (1995)
- Michael Collins (1996)
- The Full Monty (1997)
- The Avengers (1998)
- Sleepy Hollow (1999)
- The End of the Affair (1999)
- Harry Potter and the Philosopher's Stone (2001)
- Ella Enchanted (2004)
- Charlie and the Chocolate Factory (2005)
- Joyeux Noël (2005)
- Breakfast on Pluto (2006)
- The Omen (2006)
- Penelope (2006)
- Son of Rambow (2007)
- The Water Horse: Legend of the Deep (2007)
- Sweeney Todd: The Demon Barber of Fleet Street (2007)
- The Young Victoria (2009)
- The Time Traveler's Wife (2009)
- Alice in Wonderland (2010)
- Prince of Persia: The Sands of Time (2010)
- The Tourist (2010)
- Dark Shadows (2012)
- The Legend of Tarzan (2016)
- Miss Peregrine's Home for Peculiar Children (2016)
- Pirates of the Caribbean: Dead Men Tell No Tales (2017)
- Tomb Raider (2018)
- The Guernsey Literary and Potato Peel Pie Society (2018)
- Bohemian Rhapsody (2018)
- Blinded by the Light (2019)
- Dumbo (2019)
- Fast X (2023)
