= Mary Moodley =

- Born: 1913
- Died: October 23, 1979 (aged 65–66)
- Citizenship: South Africa.
- Occupation: Activist

Mary Moodley (also Aunty Mary; 1913 – October 23, 1979) was a trade unionist and anti-apartheid activist in South Africa. Moodley regularly shared her home in the black district of Wattville Township with her family and homeless people, both black and white. She was generous with the little money she had and was a "regular churchgoer."

== Early life ==
Mary Moodley, also known as Aunty Mary, was born in 1913. She lived in Wattville Township near Benoni on the East Rand, South Africa, where she regularly shared her home with her family and homeless people, both black and white. Despite having little money, she was known for her generosity and was a regular churchgoer.

Moodley became active in community and labour organising from an early age. She worked as a garment worker and became an organiser for the South African Congress of Trade Unions (SACTU) and the Food and Canning Workers Union in the 1950s. She was also a founder member of the South African Coloured People's Congress (SACPO) and a grassroots organiser for the Federation of South African Women (FEDSAW).

== Career ==
Moodley was involved with the South African Congress of Trade Unions (SACTU), the Food and Canning Workers Union, the African National Congress (ANC), the Federation of South African Women, and a founding member of the South African Coloured People's Congress (SACPO). She was working with the Food and Canning Workers Union in the 1950s in the East Rand.

In 1963, she was banned under the order of the Suppression of Communism Act. Because of her ban, she was not allowed to participate in trade unions or attend meetings and was confined to her magisterial district in Benoni. In 1964, she was detained under the 90-Days Act. She had been helping people who had become fugitives leave South Africa. Her Ban, which was to last five years was consistently renewed and in order to go to the hospital, she had to request a permit from local authorities. She died on October 23, 1979.

== See also ==
- List of people subject to banning orders under apartheid
