= Simple Man =

Simple Man may refer to:

== Music ==
- Simple Man (Klaus Nomi album), 1982
- Simple Man (Charlie Daniels album), 1989
- "Simple Man" (Charlie Daniels song), 1989
- "Simple Man" (Lynyrd Skynyrd song), 1973
- "Simple Man" (Noiseworks song), 1989
- "Simple Man" a song by Graham Nash from the album Songs for Beginners, 1971
- "Simple Man" a song by Bad Company from the album Run with the Pack, 1976
- "Simple Man" a song by Hardcore Superstar from their self-titled album
- "Simple Man", a song by Mischa Daniels & Sandro Monte feat. J-Son, 2011
- "Simple Man", a song by Australian hip-hop outfit, Diafrix, featuring Daniel Merriweather, 2012

== Other media ==
- "Simple Man" (CSI: Miami), a 2003 episode of CSI: Miami
- A Simple Man (book), a book written by Ronnie Kasrils on South African President Jacob Zuma
- The Measure of a Man (2015 film) (A Simple Man), a French drama film

== See also ==
- "I Am a Simple Man", a 1991 song by Ricky Van Shelton
