= Christian Action =

Inter-church movement, 1946 to 1996

Christian Action, founded in 1946, was an inter-church movement dedicated to promoting Christian ideals in society at large.

Canon John Collins (1905–1982) founded the Fellowship of the Transfiguration of Our Lord in 1943, when working as a Royal Air Force chaplain in Wiltshire, which sought in its Rule of Life 'to make the social, economic and political implications of the Gospel effective in local, national and international affairs'.

In 1947, the Fellowship was re-founded as Christian Action "to promote Christian involvement in social issues and political life".

As Chaplain at Oriel College Oxford, Collins led a group of students in reading Victor Gollancz's Our Threatened Values "with a view to seeing whether we might be able to do something to meet the threat and to extend our influence as Christians, not only in our immediate circle, but outwards into the world at large."

From 1956 the organisation was particularly associated with the struggle against Apartheid in South Africa when Collins used available funds to form the International Defence and Aid Fund to pay legal expenses and look after the families of those being tried for treason for protesting against Apartheid, including Nelson Mandela.

Christian Action became defunct in 1996.
