= Eleanor Kasrils =

South African anti-apartheid activist (1936–2009)

- Born: Eleanor Logan; 9 March 1936; Kilmarnock, Scotland
- Died: 8 November 2009 (aged 73); Cape Town
- Spouse: Ronnie Kasrils

Eleanor Kasrils (9 March 1936 – 8 November 2009) was a Scottish-South African anti-apartheid activist.

== Early life ==
Eleanor Logan was born in Kilmarnock, Scotland in 1936, the daughter of bookseller Jimmy Logan and Helen Logan. She was raised in Durban, South Africa.

== Activism ==
Eleanor Logan worked in a bookstore in Durban in the early 1960s. She and Ronnie Kasrils were persuaded to campaign against apartheid in the aftermath of the Sharpeville massacre in 1960, as members of Umkhonto we Sizwe (MK), the armed wing of the African National Congress (ANC). In 1961, she helped Kasrils and others steal dynamite from a work site in Durban. She helped Ronnie Kasrils escape house arrest in 1963, and assisted banished and underground activists, as a driver, courier, and fundraiser.

In 1963, Kasrils was detained at Durban Central Prison under the 90 Day Act, and was admitted to the mental hospital at Fort Napier after a hunger strike and a feigned breakdown; she escaped from Fort Napier, at times in disguise as a boy, or passing as a nurse with forged identification, and joined Ronnie Kasrils in Johannesburg. From there, the Kasrils escaped to Bechuanaland (Botswana), again in disguise, and were granted political asylum. They soon moved again, to Tanzania, and eventually to the United Kingdom.

She was an assistant to Oliver Tambo who was the ANC President. She recruited the casting director Susie Figgis to support the cause.

In 1979, she served on the International Year of the Child committee of the African National Congress in London. She worked at the London College of Fashion as an administrator, and remained active on behalf of the ANC in England and Scotland until 1993, when she returned to South Africa with her husband and son. The Kasrils were granted amnesty in 2001. Her husband became South Africa's Minister of Intelligence Services in 2004.

== Personal life and legacy ==
Eleanor married her second husband Ronnie Kasrils in 1964, in Dar es Salaam, after several years together. Her children included Brigid, her daughter from her first marriage, and sons Andrew Kasrils and Christopher Kasrils, both born in London. Upon her death from a stroke in late 2009, at age 73, Nelson Mandela paid tribute to Kasrils' work, and referred to her as a “genteel and elegant Scottish woman”. Her widower published a biography of Kasrils, The Unlikely Secret Agent, in 2010.
