= Ronnie Kasrils =

South African politician (born 1938)

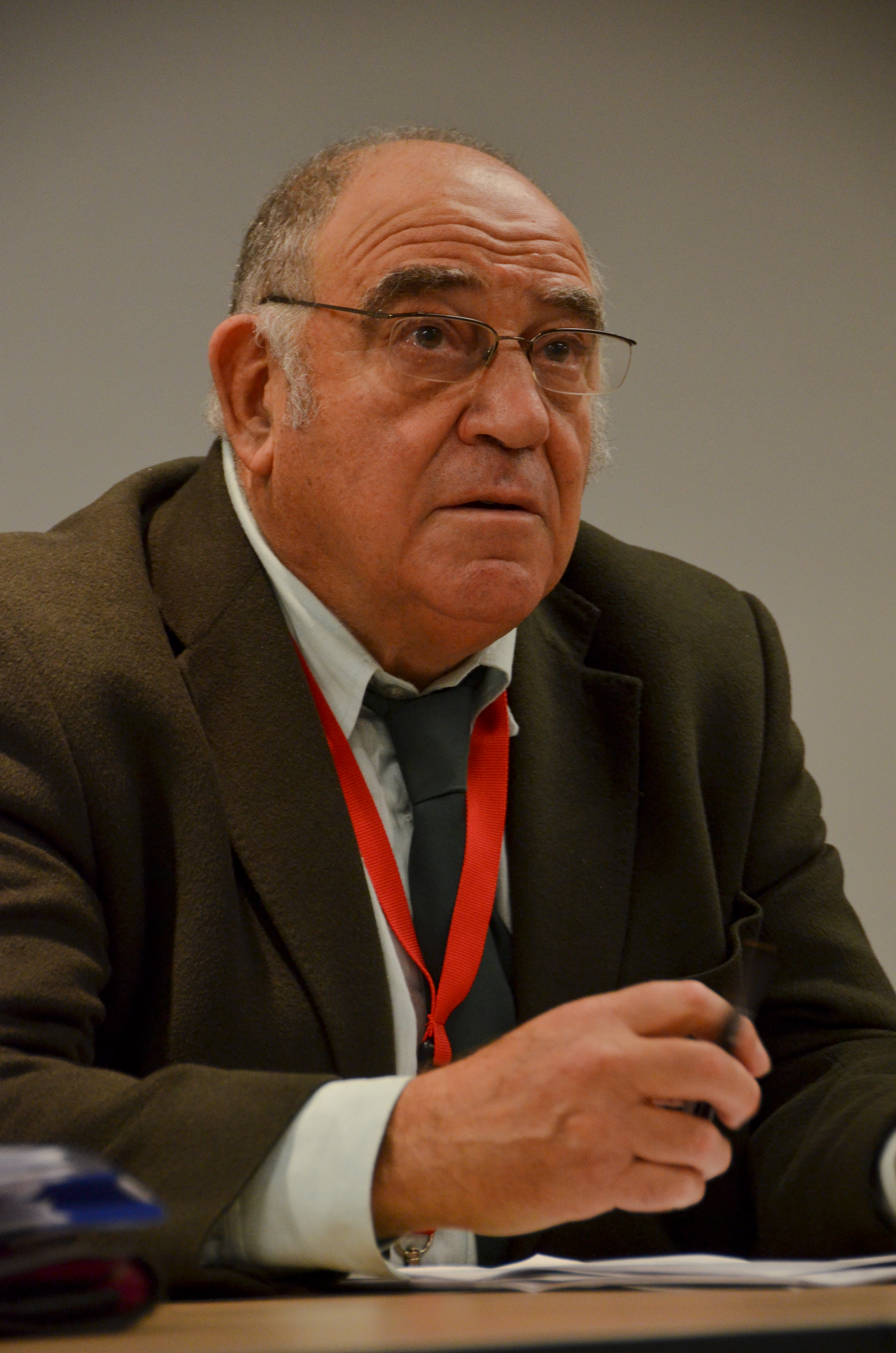
- Kasrils in 2013

Minister of Intelligence Services
- In office 27 April 2004 – 25 September 2008
- President: Thabo Mbeki
- Preceded by: Lindiwe Sisulu
- Succeeded by: Siyabonga Cwele

Minister of Water Affairs and Forestry
- In office 17 June 1999 – 27 April 2004
- President: Thabo Mbeki
- Preceded by: Kader Asmal
- Succeeded by: Buyelwa Sonjica

Minister of Defence and Military Veterans
- In office 24 June 1994 – 17 June 1999
- President: Nelson Mandela
- Preceded by: Gene Louw
- Succeeded by: Mluleki George

Personal details
- Born: Ronald Kasrils; 15 November 1938 (age 87) Yeoville, Johannesburg, Union of South Africa
- Party: South African Communist Party
- Other political affiliations: African National Congress
- Spouse(s): Eleanor Kasrils (m. 1965; died 2009) Amina Frense (m. 2012)
- Civilian awards: 2011 – Alan Paton Award; 2018 – Lifetime Achievement Literary Award
- Military awards: Unitas (Unity) Medal Service Medal

Ronald Kasrils (born 15 November 1938) is a South African politician, former guerrilla, anti-apartheid activist, and military commander. A member of the Central Committee of the South African Communist Party (SACP) from December 1986 to 2007, he served in a number of ministerial posts, including as the Minister for Intelligence Services from 2004 to 2008. He was a member of the National Executive Committee (NEC) of the African National Congress (ANC) from 1987 to 2007.

== Early life ==
Kasrils' grandparents were Jewish immigrants from Latvia and Lithuania who fled from Czarist pogroms at the end of the 19th century. He is the son of Rene (born Cohen) and Isidore Kasrils. His father was a factory salesman. His mother worked as a shop assistant prior to her marriage. Through his mother, he is related to the activist Jacqueline Arenstein. He was raised in the predominantly Jewish suburb of Yeoville in Johannesburg and had his Bar Mitzvah at the Yeoville Synagogue. He matriculated at King Edward VII School in Johannesburg. He subsequently became a scriptwriter for films in Johannesburg from 1958 to 1960 before accepting a position as a television and film director for Lever Brothers' advertising division in Durban from 1960 to 1962.

== Anti-apartheid activism ==
The Sharpeville massacre radicalised Kasrils against the apartheid system and he joined the African National Congress (ANC) in 1960, becoming secretary of the Congress of Democrats in Natal in 1961, the same year he joined the South African Communist Party. In 1962, he received a five-year banning order prohibiting him from public speaking. He was a founding member of Umkhonto we Sizwe (MK) as member of Natal Regional Command during the same year. He became the commander of Natal Regional Command in 1963. In 1964 and 1965 he underwent military training in East Germany and the USSR, going to London in late 1965 to work for the anti-apartheid movement. During this time Kasrils worked with Yusuf Dadoo, Joe Slovo and Jack Hodgson and they formed a special committee (1966–76) to develop underground activities in South Africa from the United Kingdom. He trained various people including Raymond Suttner, Jeremy Cronin, Ahmed Timol, Alex Moumbaris, Tim Jenkin, and Dave and Sue Rabkin, with the aim of establishing underground propaganda units in South Africa. He served the ANC and was based in London, Luanda, Maputo, Swaziland, Botswana, Lusaka and Harare. Kasrils eventually became a member of MK's High Command and was appointed as Chief of MK Intelligence in 1983.

Kasrils also served on the ANC's Politico-Military Council from 1985 to 1989 and worked underground for the ANC in South Africa during Operation Vula from 1990 to 1991. He went on to head the ANC's campaign section from 1991 to 1994.

=== Bisho massacre ===
On 7 September 1992, about 80,000 protesters from the ANC gathered outside Bisho in the Bantustan of Ciskei in South Africa to demand the resignation of Ciskei leader Oupa Gqozo and the reincorporation of Ciskei into South Africa. The protest was led by senior ANC leaders including South African Communist Party Secretary General Chris Hani, Cyril Ramaphosa, Steve Tshwete and Ronnie Kasrils. The Ciskei government banned the marchers from entering Bisho. Kasrils led an unarmed group in an attempt to break through the Ciskei Defence Force lines to enter Bisho. Ciskei Defence Force soldiers opened fire on the marchers with automatic weapons, killing 28 marchers and injuring over 200. A member of the Ciskei Defence Force was also killed, although this was the result of being shot by another member of the Force. More than 425 rounds were fired, the first fusillade lasting one-and-a-half minutes, and the second lasting a minute.

The Goldstone Commission was tasked with investigating the massacre. The Commission noted there was no evidence to suggest the demonstrators had fired shots, as suggested by Gqozo and condemned the Ciskei leader for banning the protest. The Commission criticised Kasrils for leading marchers to try to enter Bisho.

== In the ANC government ==
After the first fully democratic elections in South Africa in 1994, Kasrils became a member of the Transitional Executive Council's (TEC) Sub-Council on Defence. He was appointed as Deputy Minister of Defence on 24 June 1994, a post which he held until 16 June 1999. He was also the Minister of Water Affairs and Forestry from 1999 to 2004 and was appointed as Minister of Intelligence Services in 2004.

Following the resignation of President Thabo Mbeki in September 2008, Kasrils was among those members of the Cabinet who submitted their resignations on 23 September.

== Positions on Israel-Palestine conflict ==
Kasrils is known for his strong criticisms of the government of Israel and for his sympathies towards Palestinian political struggles. He gained international attention after penning a "Declaration of Conscience by South Africans of Jewish Descent" in 2001 against Israeli policies in the occupied territories. He has participated in events in the Palestinian territories with all elected Palestinian parties and endorses a two-state solution premised on the 1967 borders.

In a two-part essay "David and Goliath: Who is Who in the Middle East" published in the ANC's theoretical journal Umrabulo in late 2006 and early 2007, Kasrils outlined a history of Israel-Palestine since 1948 very critical of Israeli governments and military actions. Parts of the essay were published in the Mail&Guardian in a summarised form under the title "Rage of the Elephant: Israel in Lebanon." The article caused considerable controversy, when Kasrils, commenting on the results of civilian deaths following the Israeli invasion of Lebanon in July 2006, and referring to the Israeli leadership, noted: "... we must call baby killers 'baby killers' and declare that those using methods reminiscent of the Nazis be told that they are behaving like Nazis."

In November 2006, the South African Jewish Report lodged a complaint of hate speech against Kasrils with the South African Human Rights Commission on the basis that the articles in Umrabulo and the Mail&Guardian violated Constitutional protections (viz. Section 16(2)(c) of the Bill of Rights). On 29 March 2007, the Commission ruled that Kasrils had not engaged in hate speech, and observed: "Mr Kasrils' call for peaceful negotiations is not compatible with the interpretation that he is calling for the destruction of the state of Israel. Neither can his comments reasonably be associated with Holocaust denials."

In May 2007, during a visit to the Palestinian territories, Kasrils met with the Political Leader of Hamas Ismail Haniyeh and invited him to make his first visit outside the Muslim world to South Africa. South Africa's Jewish Board of Deputies criticised the invitation, saying the "racist ideology" of Haniyeh's Hamas organisation, which led the Palestinian unity government at that time, stood in contrast to South Africa's own post-apartheid ideals. In response to criticism of the invitation Kasrils was quoted in Haaretz on 7 May 2007 as stating: "Those who myopically object to such invitations merely show that they have learnt nothing from South Africa's transition".

On 7 October 2023, the same day that Hamas launched a surprise attack on Israeli villages near the Gaza Strip, Kasrils, along with other members of the Palestinian Solidarity Campaign, announced his support for Hamas. He recognized the operation "by the Palestinian resistance in Gaza as a legitimate expression of their right to resist."

== Political activity after leaving office ==
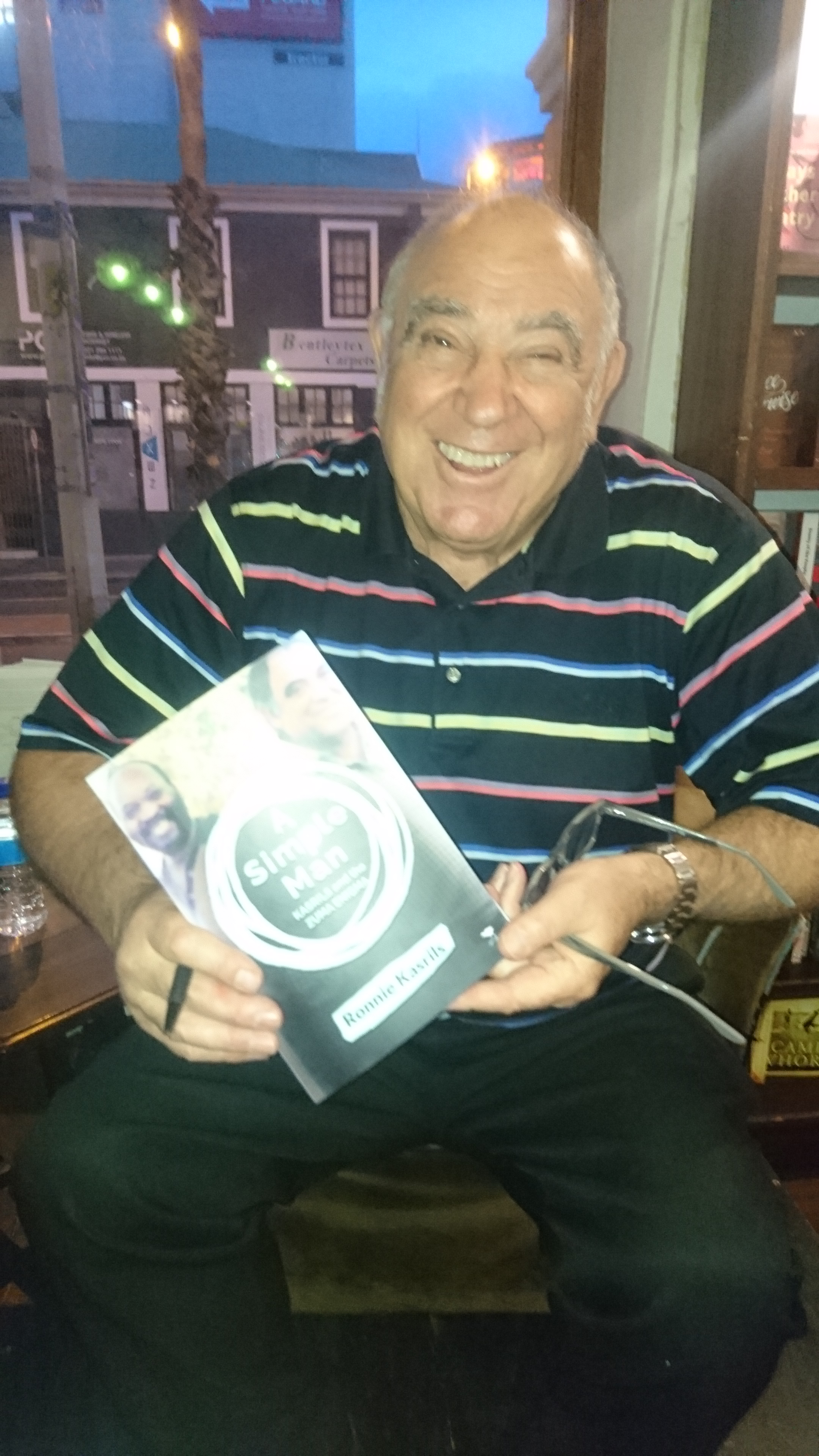
Ronnie Kasrils at the book launch of A Simple Man in Cape Town in 2017. The book is highly critical of Jacob Zuma.

Kasrils was strongly critical of the ANC under Jacob Zuma. He is a critic of what he has called the "descent into police state depravity". In April 2014, he launched the "Vote No" campaign alongside fellow ANC member and former government minister Nozizwe Madlala-Routledge. The campaign aims to encourage people to cast protest votes or spoilt ballots in the 2014 general election as a protest against Zuma and the perceived corruption of his government. In December 2014, Kasrils was elected to the national working committee of the newly created United Front, a workers' party led by the National Union of Metalworkers of South Africa (NUMSA), and also spoke favourably of the Economic Freedom Fighters, a newly formed leftist opposition party. In April 2016, shortly after the EFF's major court victory over President Zuma, Kasrils joined several other prominent former ANC insiders in calling for Zuma to resign.

In January 2021, he spoke at the online global launch of Jeremy Corbyn's Peace & Justice Project alongside Noam Chomsky, Len McCluskey and Yanis Varoufakis.

== Publications ==
Kasrils has written books on Bertrand Russell and poetry and articles on politics, defence and water & forestry issues. His autobiography, Armed and Dangerous, was first published in 1993 and updated and re-published in 1998 and 2004. First published in 2010, The Unlikely Secret Agent gives a personal account of Ronnie's first wife Eleanor's courage against the apartheid powers. It won the 2011 Alan Paton Award.

In 2012, Kasrils wrote a foreword to the new book called London Recruits - The Secret War against Apartheid in which stories of white non-South Africans who were recruited by Kasrils to go on numerous missions to South Africa planting leaflet bombs and other propaganda materials.

Kasrils published a book in 2017 on his experience of working with then-South African President Jacob Zuma called A Simple Man.

In 2021, Kasrils edited the book International Brigade Against Apartheid: Secrets of the War that Liberated South Africa collecting the experiences of people around the world who collaborated with Umkhonto We Sizwe (MK) in the struggle against apartheid.

== Personal life ==
Kasrils' first wife Eleanor Kasrils, also a prominent anti-apartheid activist, died in 2009, after 45 years of marriage. On 2 February 2012, he married journalist Amina Frense at the Wynberg Home Affairs office, in Cape Town. He is cousin to Jacqueline Arenstein.

== Awards and decorations ==
- Unitas (Unity) Medal
- Service Medal (Gold)
- Service Medal (Silver)
- Service Medal (Bronze)

== See also ==
- List of people subject to banning orders under apartheid
