= International Defence and Aid Fund =

Financial support for anti-apartheid activists

The International Defence and Aid Fund or IDAF (also the Defence Aid Fund for Southern Africa) was a fund created by John Collins during the 1956 Treason Trial in South Africa. After learning of those accused of treason for protesting against apartheid, including Nelson Mandela, Collins created the fund in order to pay all legal expenses and look after the families of those on trial. The group was non-partisan.

This was one of the first examples of foreign intervention against apartheid in South Africa and proved very successful with over £75,000 being raised towards defending those accused. Ultimately all were acquitted

In 1981, the Defence Aid Fund for Southern Africa founded Canon Collins Trust, now known as Canon Collins Educational & Legal Assistance Trust.

== History ==
The IDAF had its start with Collins, who first wired funds to help the 156 South Africans facing charges of High Treason. Collins wired "all available Christian Action funds" in order to create a defence fund for the defendants. Collins ensured that the defendants had the "best and most progressive lawyers." In 1957, the campaigner Mary Benson joined the Defence Fund as its secretary.

Ambrose Reeves, the Bishop of Johannesburg, felt that there would be other treason trials in the future and so he asked Collins to set a "more permanent structure to defend political prisoners." Collins set up the British Defence and Aid Fund (BDAF) in response. At first BDAF was part of Christian Action, but it eventually separated from Christian Action in order to work more independently.

In addition to having independent action the fund needed to become international. In 1964, the organization opened branches in Sweden, Norway, Australia and Switzerland. Collins invited delegates from the countries that had branches to come to the Russell Hotel in Bloomsbury and together they officially founded the newly named International Defence and Aid Fund (IDAF) on 20 June 1964. In November of that year, the United Nations gave the group a "stamp of approval". In addition, Amnesty International and the Joint Committee for High Commission Territories became involved.

The South African branch of IDAF was banned in South Africa on 18 March 1966 under the Suppression of Communism Act and the government made it illegal for anyone to receive funds from IDAF. Because of this, the organization in London created three different programmes that had different names in order to send money to South Africa. Under Programme 1, which focused on political trials and defence, was the Freedom From Fear International Charitable Foundation; under Programme 2, which focused on the families of political prisoners, was the Freedom From Hunger International Charitable Foundation; and Programme 3 focused on research and publications and used the Freedom From Hardship International Trust. Activist Phyllis Altman, who worked with the South African Congress of Trade Unions (SACTU), became the general secretary of projects under Programme 1. Altman helped set up a "scam" which masked any connection between IDAF and the lawyers they paid. Altman and Collins were the only two who knew how the money was being transferred. During this time, Collins' house became a "safe venue" for IDAF. Lawyers in South Africa who were funded by the IDAF, such as Griffiths Mxenge and Victoria Mxenge were assassinated.

In the 1970s, a spy, named Craig Williamson, infiltrated an organization called the International University Exchange Fund (IUEF), which gave money to students leaving repressive regimes. Altman did not trust him and would not discuss IDAF's "inner mechanisms" with Williamson. Williamson was able to cause enough trouble so that the Danish Government became suspicious of IDAF and the Labour government minister Judith Hart turned down a request for funds from IDAF. Williamson and IUEF were exposed by Arthur McGiven in a story published in The Observer.

Collins died in 1982 and Trevor Huddleston became the new director. Altman stayed on long enough to help the transition, but retired once she felt the new people in the organization were settled. Horst Kleinschmidt took over from Altman. During the 1980s, IDAF received more and more requests for defence and for the families of the imprisoned. When apartheid was ended in 1989, IDAF "found itself having to undergo a fundamental review of its reason for existing. Eventually, each programme of IDAF was taken over by other agencies.
