= Mabel Balfour =

- Citizenship: South African
- Occupations: Trade unionist; Anti-apartheid activist
- Years active: 1950s–1960s
- Organization(s): South African Congress of Trade Unions (SACTU); African Food and Canning Workers Union (A-FCWU)
- Known for: Labour activism and opposition to apartheid
- Criminal charges: Arrested in 1958 for participation in the April Stay-at-Home protest
- Criminal penalty: £20 fine or 30 days hard labour (suspended)

Mabel Balfour was a South African trade unionist and an anti-apartheid activist. Balfour was first involved with the unions representing food and canning workers. After many leaders in the South African Congress of Trade Unions (SACTU) were arrested in the 1956 Treason Trials, she became part of the Management Committee in 1957. Balfour was considered good at keeping "the spirits of workers high during very difficult times."

Balfour was arrested in 1958 for her participation in the April Stay-At Home and sentenced to £20 or 30-days hard labor for "inciting non-white workers on the Rand." The punishment was eventually suspended. In 1962, she became the General Secretary of the African Food and Canning Workers Union (A-FCWU) in Transvaal. She was banned in 1963 and confined to house arrest in Roodepoort.

== See also ==
- List of people subject to banning orders under apartheid
