= African Clothing Workers' Union =

Trade union in South Africa

The African Clothing Workers' Union (ACWU) was a trade union representing workers in the garment industry South Africa.

The union was founded in 1928, on the initiative of the South African Communist Party (SACP), and it was a founding affiliate of the Federation of Non-European Trade Unions. While it was initially one of many new industrial unions to organise black workers, it was almost unique in surviving the Great Depression - the other two being the African Laundry Workers' Union and the Cape Town Stevedoring Workers Union.

The union was led by Gana Makabeni, who soon moved to become an early member of the African National Congress, and attempted to use the union to organise workers in other industries. In 1941, the union was a founding affiliate of the Council of Non-European Trade Unions. Makabeni led the union until his death, in 1955. He was succeeded by Viola Hashe, the first woman to lead an all-male trade union in South Africa.

In 1962, the union merged with the Garment Workers' Union of African Women, to form the National Union of Clothing Workers.
