= A Simple Man (book) =

A Simple Man - Kasrils And The Zuma Enigma
- Author: Ronnie Kasrils
- Language: English
- Subject: Jacob Zuma, Politics of South Africa
- Genre: Non-fiction
- Published: Cape Town
- Publisher: Jacana Media
- Publication date: November 2017
- Publication place: South Africa
- Pages: 280
- ISBN: 978-1-4314-2577-8

A Simple Man: Kasrils And The Zuma Enigma (2017) is a book by Ronnie Kasrils, a South African politician and former Minister of Intelligence Services in the cabinet of Thabo Mbeki. The book is an account on South African President Jacob Zuma's rise to power and its effect on the South African government.

== Background and synopsis ==
The book is highly critical of Zuma and alleges that Zuma is guilty of creating an increasingly corrupt and inept South African state. The book is also critical of the content of Zuma's character, accusing him of being "deceitful and manipulative." It argues that in addition to removing Zuma from office, corrupt officials appointed by Zuma within state institutions also need to be removed before an effective and accountable South African government can be established.
