= John Collins (priest) =

Anglican priest (1905–1982)

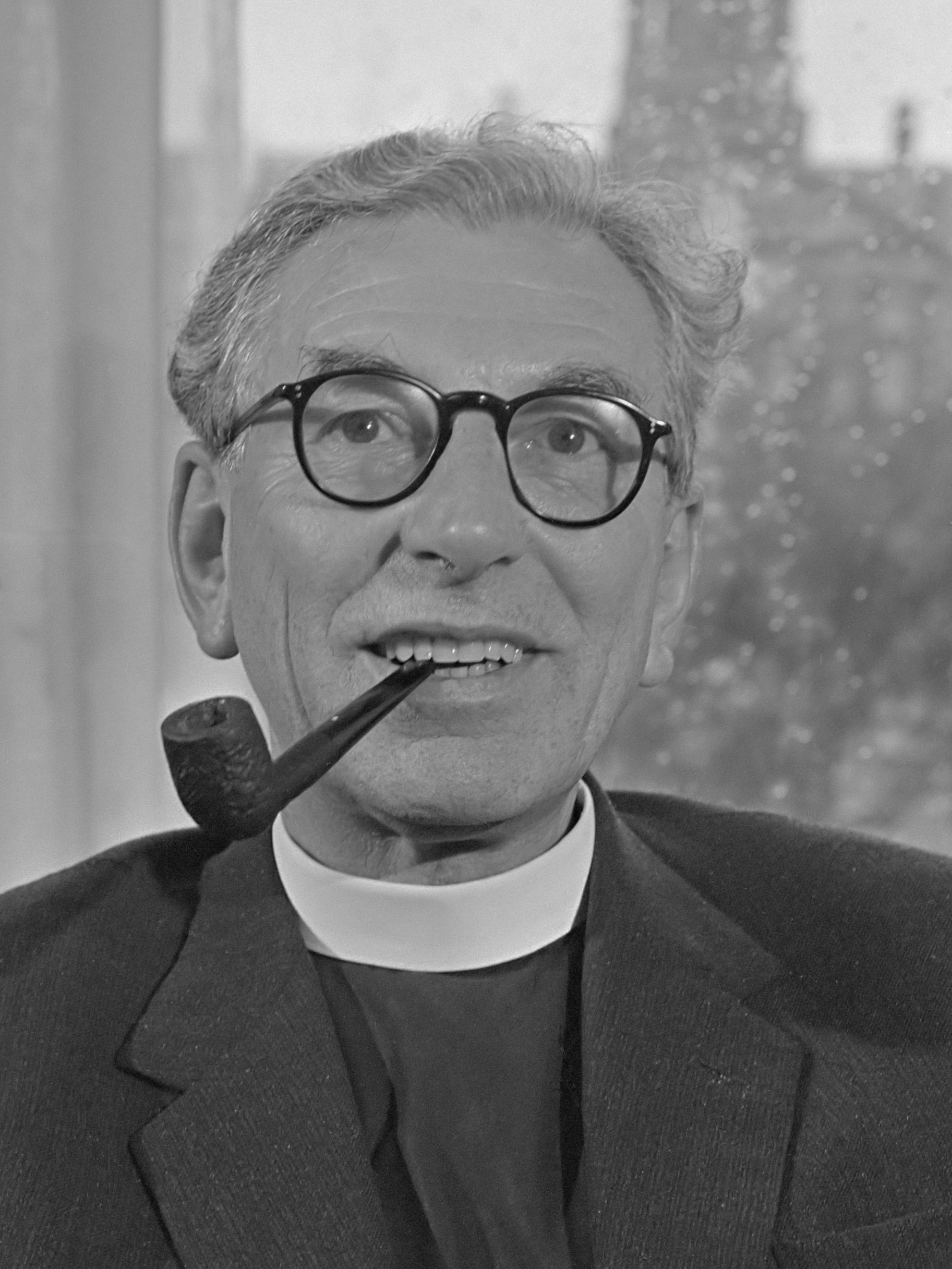
- Collins in 1966

Personal details
- Born: 23 March 1905 Hawkhurst, England
- Died: 31 December 1982 (aged 77) London, England
- Denomination: Church of England
- Spouse: Diana Clavering Elliot
- Children: 4 sons, inc. Andrew Collins
- Education: Sidney Sussex College, Cambridge

Lewis John Collins (23 March 1905 – 31 December 1982) was an English Anglican priest who was active in several radical political movements in the United Kingdom.

== Life ==
Lewis John Collins was born on 23 March 1905 at Hawkhurst, Kent, England. Educated at Cranbrook School, Kent, and Sidney Sussex College, Cambridge, Collins was ordained a priest in 1928 and served as chaplain of his old college and vice-principal of Westcott House, before becoming chaplain of Oriel College, Oxford, in 1937. He served as a chaplain in the Royal Air Force during World War II and was radicalised by the experience. In 1946, upon returning to Oxford, he founded the organization Christian Action to work for reconciliation with Germany. He was appointed as a canon of St Paul's Cathedral, London, in 1948, an office he held for 33 years. Shortly afterwards he became disturbed by the newly developing apartheid system in South Africa.

In 1951, Collins was one of the four founders of the charity War on Want, which fights global poverty. In 1956, he committed Christian Action to raising funds for the defence of anti-apartheid activists accused of treason in South Africa and this gave rise to the Defence and Aid Fund for Southern Africa. The fund raised more than £75,000 to help defend the accused during the Treason Trial. Collins was strongly opposed to a proposed cricket tour by Frank Worrell's West Indies to South Africa in 1959, leading a successful campaign to have it cancelled.

Collins was strongly opposed to the spread of nuclear weapons and was one of many on the left in Britain who believed that it was unnecessary and wrong for Britain to own such weapons. He was one of the founders of the Campaign for Nuclear Disarmament. He was also a member of the Anglican Pacifist Fellowship, working with the Reverend Sidney Hinkes on anti-nuclear campaigns.

Collins was one of the signatories of the agreement to convene a convention for drafting a world constitution. As a result, for the first time in human history, a World Constituent Assembly convened to draft and adopt the Constitution for the Federation of Earth.

The Canon Collins Educational & Legal Assistance Trust, formerly known as Canon Collins Trust for Southern Africa (CCETSA) is a charity founded in 1981. It was set up as the Defence and Aid Fund for Southern Africa and Collins was its first chairman. In the days of apartheid it provided money to help South African and Namibian refugee students gain the higher education in the United Kingdom and in independent African states. It now provides scholarships for students within South Africa and in other African countries.

Collins died on 31 December 1982 at a hospital in London.

== Family ==
Collins married Diana Clavering Elliot (1917–2003) in 1939; they had four sons, including the judge Andrew Collins, psychiatrist Dr Mark Collins, and the ballet dancer Richard Collins (1945-1991). In 1999, Diana Collins was appointed Dame Commander of the Order of the British Empire.

== Bibliography ==
- "COLLINS, Rev. Canon Lewis John", Who Was Who, A & C Black, 1920–2015; online edn, Oxford University Press, 2014. (subscription required)
- Beeson, Trevor (4 October 2008). "Collins, (Lewis) John". Oxford Dictionary of National Biography (online ed.). Oxford University Press. doi:10.1093/ref:odnb/30954. (Subscription, Wikipedia Library access or UK public library membership required.)

Preceded by Newly founded	Chair of CND; 1958–1964	Succeeded by Olive Gibbs
