= Suppression of Communism Act, 1950 =

Legislation in apartheid South Africa

Parliament of South Africa
- Long title: Act to declare the Communist Party of South Africa to be an unlawful organization; to make provision for declaring other organizations promoting communistic activities to be unlawful and for prohibiting certain periodical or other publications; to prohibit certain communistic activities; and to make provision for other incidental matters.
- Citation: Act No. 44 of 1950
- Territorial extent: South Africa, South West Africa
- Enacted by: Parliament of South Africa
- Assented to: 26 June 1950
- Commenced: 17 July 1950
- Repealed: 2 July 1982
- Administered by: Minister of Justice

Repealed by
- Internal Security Act, 1982

Keywords
- Anti-communism, political repression, exile, censorship
- Status: Repealed

The Suppression of Communism Act, 1950 (Act No. 44 of 1950), renamed the Internal Security Act in 1976, was legislation of the national government in apartheid South Africa which formally banned the Communist Party of South Africa and proscribed any party or group subscribing to communism, according to a uniquely broad definition of the term. It was also used as the basis to place individuals under banning orders, and its practical effect was to isolate and silence voices of dissent.

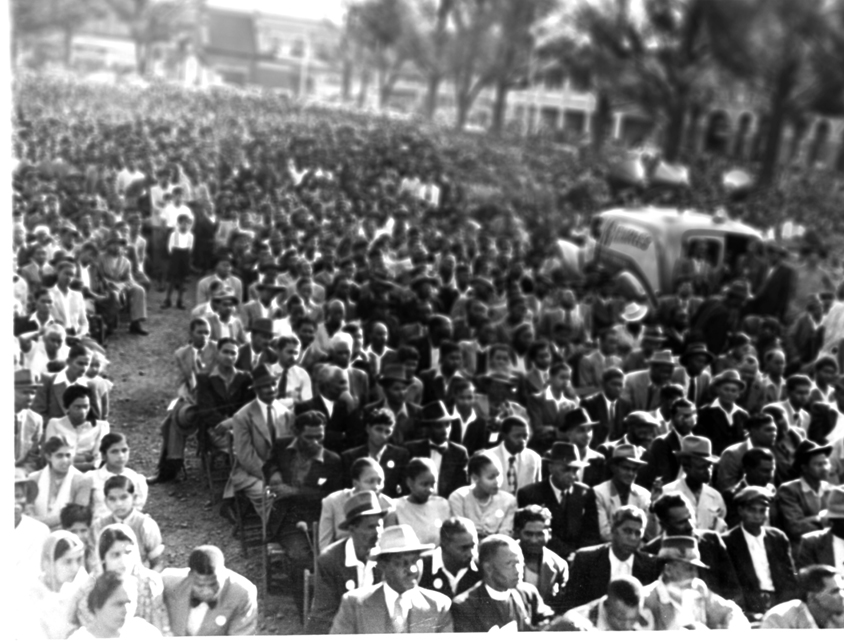
More than 20,000 black, Indian and coloured South Africans gather in Durban on 28 May 1950 to protest the Group Area and Suppression of Communism bills.

== Description ==
The Act, which came into effect on 17 July 1950, defined communism as any scheme aimed at achieving change—whether economic, social, political, or industrial—"by the promotion of disturbance or disorder" or any act encouraging "feelings of hostility between the European and the non-European races [...] calculated to further [disorder]". The Minister of Justice could deem any person to be a communist if he found that person's aims to be aligned with these aims, and could issue an order severely restricting the freedoms of anyone deemed to be a communist. After a nominal two-week appeal period, the person's status as a communist became an unreviewable matter of fact, and subjected the person to being barred from public participation, restricted in movement, or imprisoned.

The government justified passage of the Act by noting the involvement of members of the South African Communist Party in the internal resistance to apartheid, the subversive tactics of communist parties more widely, as well as the perceived threat of the Soviet Union in the emerging Cold War and decolonisation.

The opposition in the House of Assembly protested certain functions of the act, such as the possibility to ban individuals purposely advocating communist goals, circumventing the normal rule of law guarantees in the South African legal system. The government responded by watering down the act, explicitly outlining the right to due process before penalties (i.e. fines or imprisonment) were executed, requiring the Minister of Justice to submit requests to ban to a three-member committee, affording the right to redress by those issued a banning order, as well as exempting labour unions from the sanctions included in the act. These guarantees, however, were not followed reliably, and banning orders emerged as one of the most effective tools of the South African government throughout the apartheid era.

== Effect ==
The Act was worded in such a way that anyone who opposed government policy could be deemed a communist. Since the Act explicitly declared that communism sought to encourage racial disharmony, it was frequently used to legally gag critics of racial segregation and apartheid. The Act defined communism so sweepingly that defendants were frequently convicted of "statutory communism". Justice Frans Rumpff, presiding in the 1952 trial of African National Congress (ANC) leaders, observed that such an offence might have "nothing to do with communism as it is commonly known."

The Act facilitated the government suppression of organisations such as the ANC and others which advocated for equal rights for blacks, coloureds and Indians. The Act forced these groups to go underground with their activism. Because of this Act, groups such as uMkhonto we Sizwe, led by Nelson Mandela as a branch of the ANC, did seek financial support from the Communist Party.

== Superseded 1982 ==
Most of the Act was replaced in 1982 by the Internal Security Act, 1982.
