= South African Associated Newspapers =

South African Associated Newspapers (SAAN) was an English language South African newspaper group formed in 1995. Its three important newspapers were the Rand Daily Mail, Sunday Times and Sunday Express. It was at one time the second largest newspaper group in the country.

== History ==
The Rand Daily Mail was founded in 1902 by businessman Harry Cohen and managed by editor Edgar Wallace. Cohen purchased the linotype machines and printing presses for the newspaper from Emmanuel Mendelssohn, equipment from the defunct The Standard and Diggers' News. Extravagant operational expenses by Wallace almost bankrupted the newspaper and Cohen had to step in to limited spending. It was bought by mining magnate Abe Bailey in 1905 after the death of Harry Cohen, after the intervention of Lord Milner who feared it would be purchased by Boer nationalists, and Bailey formed a company called the Rand Daily Mails Ltd. Bailey leased the paper out to three people, George H. Kingswell, who became the general manager, Ralph Ward Jackson its editor and A. V. Lindbergh its distributor as CNA chairman. The three men would go on to form The Sunday Times which worked in conjunction with the paper.

By May 1915, Rand Daily Mails Ltd (RDM) absorbed the Transvaal Leader and the Sunday Times Syndicate Ltd, the Sunday Post when the Cape Times Ltd sold it for shares in the RDM and became the only morning and Sunday newspapers in Johannesburg but the Times' shareholding was soon bought out by Abe Bailey.

In 1934 I. W. Schlesinger created competition when he formed the Sunday Express and then in 1937, the Daily Express. In an attempt to control the newspaper market, the RDM, Sunday Times and Argus group bought out Schlesinger's newspaper interests in 1939, closing down the Daily Tribune (Durban), Daily Express (Johannesburg) and Sunday Tribune (Durban) but kept the Sunday Express (Johannesburg).

In 1955, the two companies, Rand Daily Mail Ltd and the Sunday Times Syndicate Ltd were formed into a single company called South African Associated Newspapers (SAAN). Prior to the formation, the Abe Bailey estate had 59.23% share in RDM and 26.17% in Sunday Times Syndicate which gave the estate 49.71% in the new company SAAN. The other owners of SAAN included Kingswell, Ward Jackson and Lindbergh. In 1959, SAAN purchased controlling interests in the Eastern Province Herald and the Evening Post, both based in Port Elizabeth. It also had a minor shareholding in the Pretoria News with the Argus Group.

By 1962 Kingswells share was sold to Bailey's and the two others to private trusts just before the company was listed on the stock exchange the same year with the Bailey's estate owning just over 50% after the stock listing. SAAN bought 20% of the Cape Times in 1963 and by 1973, it owned all of the newspaper.

1968 saw Syfrets, the company managing the Bailey's interest, and other shareholders sell 65% of the shares in SAAN to the Argus Group. The government stepped in, and the offer was limited to 33% which the Argus Group purchased.

In October 1975, Louis Luyt, an Afrikaner businessman and with secret links to the National Party government, attempt to purchase a controlling interest in SAAN. The Rand Daily Mail saw this as an attempt by the government to control a large portion of the English language newspapers and spread a pro-government message to English speaking readers. It was later discovered, by the London Sunday Times, that Luyts backers included, Axel Springer, John McGoff, Sir De Villiers Graaff and Netherlands based publication called To The Point that was indirectly financed by the South African governments Department of Information, the latter's attempt was eventually exposed during the Info Scandal. The secretive government operation to purchase SAAN was called Project Annemarie, and was authorised by Bureau of State Security and the Department of Information, and was eventually exposed in part by the Rand Daily Mail. The Advowson Trust was formed by members of South Africa's English business community to counter the possible merger when Gordon Waddell's Johannesburg Consolidated Investments (JCI) bought 20% of the shares and the Argus Group purchased 39%. Luyt would announce in January 1976 that he was launching The Citizen.

In 1981, the Argus Group was the largest single shareholder in SAAN, with 39.39%. Other major shareholders, include Anglo American 20.96%, Nedbank 7.54%, Bailey Trust 8.21% and Stephen Mulholland, 1.18%. The group also included the Financial Mail. SAAN closed the Rand Daily Mail and the Sunday Express in April 1985 as they were losing large amounts of money. The company became Times Media Limited in 1987, which later became Johnnic Publishing and finally, from 20 November 2007, Avusa Media Limited. In 2013, the name was changed back to Times Media Limited.
