= Eschel Rhoodie =

South African politician (1933–1993)

Secretary of the Department of Information
- In office 1972–1977

Personal details
- Born: 11 July 1933 Caledon, Cape Province, South Africa
- Died: 17 July 1993 (aged 60) Atlanta, Georgia, U.S.
- Education: University of Pretoria

Eschel Mostert Rhoodie (11 July 1933 – 17 July 1993) was a South African civil servant, public relations officer and spin doctor most famous as being one of the key players in the 1978–79 Information Scandal, also known as "Infogate" or "Muldergate". He served as the Secretary of the Department of Information between 1972 and 1977, while Connie Mulder was Minister of the department.

== Early life ==
He was born on 11 July 1933 in Caledon, Cape Province, Union of South Africa. He earned a PhD from the University of Pretoria. His thesis was a study of "penal systems in the British Commonwealth".

== Early career ==
Believing that standard diplomatic activity was insufficient to improve Apartheid South Africa's negative image abroad, Rhoodie hatched secret projects, with the knowledge and the huge financial support of top political leaders. One example was the global use of public funds for the covert enticing of finance journalists to write positive articles about South Africa in publications such as the Dutch weekly magazine To the Point. Rhoodie was employed as the press officer of the South African embassy in The Hague in 1971 and he made a clandestine agreement with Dutch publisher Hubert Jussen to establish the magazine. To the Point was to be secretly financed by the South African government. The secret scheme had the approval of the Prime Minister, B.J. Vorster, the chief of the Intelligence Services, General Hendrik van den Bergh, the Minister of Information, Connie Mulder and Gerald Barrie, the head of the Department of Information.

== Secretary of Department of Information ==
In July 1972, Rhoodie, at the age of 38, was appointed to the post of Secretary of Information. That promotion was quite controversial in South African politics, since Rhoodie was not a member of the Afrikaner Broederbond, a secret fraternal organization dedicated to the promotion of the interests of Afrikaners. He was young, dynamic, enterprising and impatient, particularly with the bureaucratic process, which were the qualities that enabled him to get things done.

Shortly after his appointment to what would later be called the Dirty Tricks Department, Rhoodie recruited as his deputies Les de Villiers and his own brother, Deneys Rhoodie. Initially, To the Point was the only secret project in operation, but the Bureau of State Security had plans for a number of other schemes and a long list of spooks (secret agents) willing to see them through. Soon, a second project was instituted.

Now, it was the creation of an organization designed to counter South Africa's sporting isolation. The result was the Committee for Fairness in Sport. Then came a scheme involving a group of influential businessmen abroad. The Club of Ten, as the group was known, had the difficult task of tackling the news media, the United Nations, other institutions, individuals and countries for their perceived double-dealing and hypocrisy on South Africa. A number of influential individuals operated more covertly to improve South Africa's image abroad.

By 1975, "Project Annemarie" was conceived (Annemarie was the name of Rhoodie's teenage daughter). It was for the introduction of an English-language newspaper to counter attacks on the apartheid government by the English press, particularly the Rand Daily Mail. The man chosen to front the operation was Louis Luyt, a fertilizer millionaire. When Luyt's attempt to become a major shareholder was blocked, he announced that he intended to create his own independent newspaper.

That is how the Department of Information covertly launched The Citizen in 1976.

Other publications and front organizations like The Study of Plural Societies, the SA Freedom Foundation and the Foreign Affairs Association were also funded by the Department of Information. During that time, the Bureau of State Security created the Committee for Fairness in Sport to counteract South Africa's exclusion from international sport.

== Information Scandal ==
When the misappropriation of state funds came to light during the Muldergate, Rhoodie fled to Ecuador. Now, he was South Africa's most wanted man, and the government had instituted legal proceedings against him. In March 1979, Rhoodie moved to Great Britain, where he attempted to gain political asylum. In a BBC television interview with David Dimbleby on March 21, 1979, Rhoodie strongly denied the accusations made against him, reiterated his claim that he was being made a scapegoat for the whole affair and maintained that senior government figures, including the Prime Minister of South Africa, John Vorster, knew of and sanctioned the secret projects that he had conducted as head of the Department of Information. Shortly afterwards, Rhoodie moved to France, where he was eventually arrested by the French authorities and then extradited.

By 1979, Rhoodie was found guilty of fraud and sentenced to six years in prison. The sentence was later reversed by the appeals court in Bloemfontein. Rhoodie and his wife, Katie, left for the United States in 1982.

His book, The Real Information Scandal, which was published in October 1983, contained sweeping allegations of big-name involvement in secret information projects, involving military alliances with Israel and the election of Ronald Reagan as US president.

== Life in the US ==
Rhoodie moved to Atlanta, Georgia, where he "ran a consulting business for South Africans seeking to move to the United States".

== Personal life and death ==
Rhoodie was married to Catherine Bondesio; they had a son, Eschel Rhoodie Jr., and a daughter, Anna-Marie Kern. They resided in Smyrna, Georgia near Atlanta. He died of a heart attack while playing tennis on 17 July 1993 in Atlanta, Georgia. He was 60 years old.

== Selected works ==
- Rhoodie, Eschel (1967). Penal Systems of the Commonwealth: A Criminological Survey against the Background of the Cornerstones for a Progressive Correctional Policy. Pretoria, S.A.: Academica. OCLC 987665713.
- Rhoodie, Eschel (1968). South-West: the last frontier in Africa. New York: Twin Circle Publishing Company. OCLC 853081197.
- Rhoodie, Eschel (1969). The Paper Curtain. Johannesburg: Voortrekkerpers. OCLC 606020953.
- Rhoodie, Eschel (1968). The Third Africa. Cape Town, S.A.: Nasional Boekhandel. OCLC 899012747.
- Rhoodie, Eschel (1983). The Real Information Scandal. Atlanta, Georgia: Orbis. ISBN 9780620070577. OCLC 11621126.
- Rhoodie, Eschel (1984). Discrimination in the Constitutions of the World: A Study of the Group Rights Problem. Columbus, Georgia: Brentwood. ISBN 9780916573034. OCLC 715000994.
- Rhoodie, Eschel (1989). Discrimination against Women: A Global Survey of the Economic, Educational, Social and Political Status of Women. Jefferson, North Carolina: McFarland & Co. ISBN 9780899504483. OCLC 493741761.
- Rhoodie, Eschel (1989). PW Botha: The Last Betrayal. Melville, Gauteng, S.A.: S.A. Politics. ISBN 9780620141932. OCLC 948971603.
