= Randfontein (House of Assembly of South Africa constituency) =

South African constituency, 1915–1920

- Former constituency for the South African House of Assembly
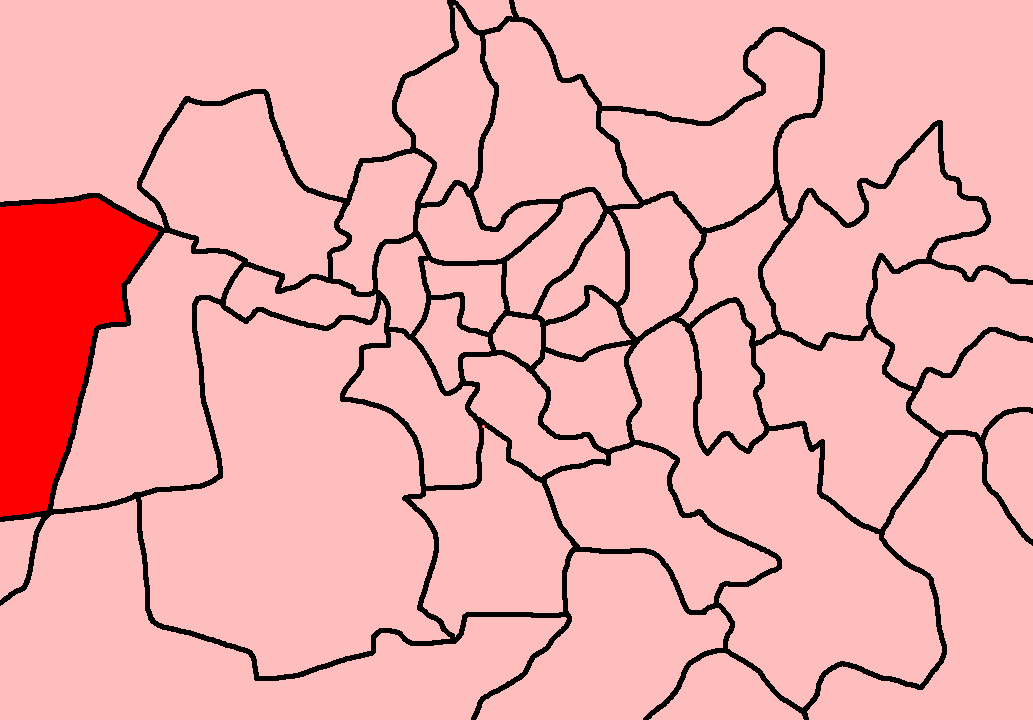
- Location of Randfontein within the Witwatersrand (1981)
- Province: Transvaal
- Electorate: 26,000 (1989)

Former constituency
- Created: 1915; 1948
- Abolished: 1920; 1994
- Number of members: 1
- Last MHA: Corné Mulder (CP)
- Replaced by: Gauteng

Randfontein was a constituency in the Transvaal Province of South Africa, which existed from 1915 to 1920 and again from 1948 to 1994. It covered a part of the West Rand centred on the town of Randfontein. Throughout its existence it elected one member to the House of Assembly and one to the Transvaal Provincial Council.

== Franchise notes ==
When the Union of South Africa was formed in 1910, the electoral qualifications in use in each pre-existing colony were kept in place. In the Transvaal Colony, and its predecessor the South African Republic, the vote was restricted to white men, and as such, elections in the Transvaal Province were held on a whites-only franchise from the beginning. The franchise was also restricted by property and education qualifications until the 1933 general election, following the passage of the Women's Enfranchisement Act, 1930 and the Franchise Laws Amendment Act, 1931. From then on, the franchise was given to all white citizens aged 21 or over. Non-whites remained disenfranchised until the end of apartheid and the introduction of universal suffrage in 1994.

== History ==
The Randfontein constituency was one of a handful of new seats created on the Witwatersrand for the 1915 general election and abolished just five years later. Its first election saw eccentric mining magnate Sir Joseph Robinson elected as an independent, facing mainly Labour opposition. He left parliament on the seat's abolition, but later became known for his attempt to buy a peerage from the British government.

Randfontein returned to the electoral map in 1948, just in time to help vote the Herenigde Nasionale Party into government, and for the next forty years would be a safe seat for the governing party. Its dominating personality almost throughout that period was Connie Mulder, who was first elected as Randfontein's MP in 1958 and became a close ally of John Vorster during the latter's premiership. In 1977, he was caught up in the Muldergate scandal, and was expelled both from Parliament and from the NP as a result - however, he remained active in right-wing politics, and in 1987 made a comeback as MP for Randfontein, now representing the Conservative Party. By then, he was dying of cancer, and in 1988 the by-election to replace him was won by his son, Corné Mulder. The latter remains active in politics to this day, becoming the leader of Freedom Front Plus in 2025, and as of 2025 is the longest continuously serving MP in South Africa.

== Members ==
Election	Member	Party
1915	Sir Joseph Robinson	Independent
1920	Constituency abolished	

Election	Member	Party
1948	Nico Diederichs	HNP
1953	Nico Diederichs	National
1958	Connie Mulder	National
1961	Connie Mulder	National
1966	Connie Mulder	National
1970	Connie Mulder	National
1974	Connie Mulder	National
1977	Connie Mulder	National
1979 by	Boy Geldenhuys	National
1981	Boy Geldenhuys	National
1987	Connie Mulder	Conservative
1988 by	Corné Mulder	Conservative
1989	Corné Mulder	Conservative
1994	constituency abolished	

== Detailed results ==
=== Elections in the 1910s ===
General election 1915: Randfontein
Party	Candidate	Votes	%	±%
Independent	Sir Joseph Robinson, Bt.	1,100	64.6	New
Labour	J. Hoatson	410	24.1	New
National	W. M. Edwards	169	9.9	New
Independent	J. W. P. Tully	25	1.5	New
Majority		690	40.5	N/A
Turnout		1,704	74.3	N/A
Independent win (new seat)				
