= Connie Mulder =

South African politician (1925–1988)

Cornelius Petrus Mulder
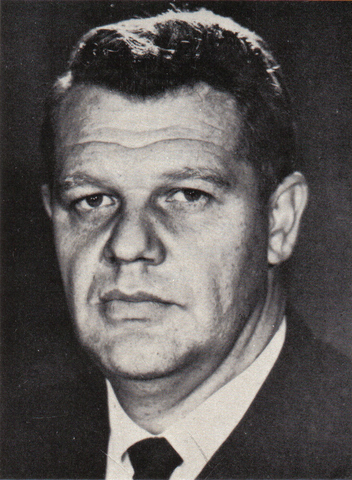

Minister of Information
- In office 1968–1978
- Prime Minister: John Vorster
- Preceded by: Jan de Klerk
- Succeeded by: office abolished

Member of Parliament for Randfontein
- In office 6 May 1987 – 12 January 1988
- Preceded by: B. L. Geldenhuys
- Succeeded by: Corné Mulder
- In office 1958–1979
- Preceded by: Nico Diederichs
- Succeeded by: B. L. Geldenhuys

Personal details
- Born: 5 June 1925 Warmbaths, Transvaal, South Africa
- Died: 12 January 1988 (aged 62) Johannesburg, Transvaal Province, South Africa
- Party: Conservative; National
- Children: Pieter Mulder, Corné Mulder

Cornelius Petrus Mulder (5 June 1925 – 12 January 1988) was a South African politician and cabinet minister.

== Early life ==
Mulder was born on 5 June 1925. He was the son of a school principal and grew up with nine siblings. He studied for his bachelor of arts degree and received a diploma in education in 1945. He started his career as a teacher of Afrikaans, German and history in Randfontein and then attended the University of the Witwatersrand, where he received his PhD. His doctorate thesis was titled Die invloed van die Bybel op die ontstaan van die Afrikaanse volksaard (The Influence of the Bible in the forming of the Afrikaans National Character).

== Political career ==
=== Mayor of Randfontein ===
Mulder became involved in local politics in Randfontein, becoming a member of the city council in 1951. He was elected as the deputy mayor and chair of the council's finance committee and later was elected as the mayor in 1953, when he was 28 years old. In 1955, he was elected president of the Transvaal Municipal Association. He was elected mayor for a second term in 1957 and he was a member of the United Municipal Executive of South Africa for four years. He became increasingly involved with the National Party, serving as chair of its divisional committee.

=== Member of Parliament ===
Mulder was elected to the legislature in the 1958 general election, representing the district of Randfontein for the National Party. He was named as the Minister of Information in 1968 by the Prime Minister John Vorster. He was later appointed as the Minister of Bantu Administration (later renamed as the Minister of Plural Relations) in 1978, while maintaining his previous ministerial appointment. Following the death of the Finance Minister Nico Diederichs, it was generally believed that Mulder would succeed Vorster as prime minister.

==== Muldergate Scandal ====
In 1977, he was implicated as the namesake of the Muldergate scandal. In September 1972, Mulder appointed Eschel Rhoodie as the Secretary of Information and the department began to push propaganda, ultimately spending millions to influence media outlets in South Africa and abroad to support the government's Apartheid policies. They assisted John McGoff, an American newspaper publisher who supported the administration, in his efforts to purchase The Washington Star and The Sacramento Union. His department also financed the South African newspaper The Citizen to bolster support for Vorster's regime among English-speaking South Africans in an attempt to counter the liberal The Rand Daily Mail. Ultimately in 1977, the Auditor-General, Gerald Barrie, leaked the evidence that state funds had been misused.

Though the scandal eventually brought about Vorster's downfall and complete retirement from politics, Mulder lost the ballot to succeed him in September 1978. He barely lost in the first round to Pieter Willem Botha in a narrow 72-78 vote. In the second round, he lost with a comfortable 98 votes to 74, in Botha's favour. This was because 20 supporters of foreign minister Pik Botha (the third candidate in the race) threw their support to P.W. Botha, and only two to Mulder. Mulder was subsequently retained in Botha's reshuffling of the government. However, the Information Scandal stories started appearing in the media, which led to his resignation as minister on 8 November 1978.

From documents that reached The Spectator, in a separate scandal, Mulder had a financial interest in certain South African companies which run a group of private enterprise mental homes for the blacks.

==== Founding of the National Conservative Party ====
Following his expulsion from the National Party in the wake of the Information Scandal, Mulder and his followers formed the National Conservative Party. However, all of the party's nine candidates were defeated at the 1981 general election. Mulder himself lost by 922 votes in the constituency of Randfontein, where he had won in the 1977 general election with a majority of 7,763. After the founding of the Conservative Party, in which he participated, Mulder was elected to the House of Assembly at the 1987 general election, at the age of 62.

== Death and legacy ==
By then suffering from terminal cancer, he died on 12 January 1988 before he was able to take his seat.

His two sons, Pieter and Corné, became Conservative Party MPs in 1988. After the 2009 general election, both sons served in the National Assembly of South Africa as Members of Parliament for the Freedom Front Plus. Pieter later resigned as M.P. and party leader in November 2016. Corné still serves in Parliament as a member of Freedom Front Plus.
