= Britstown =

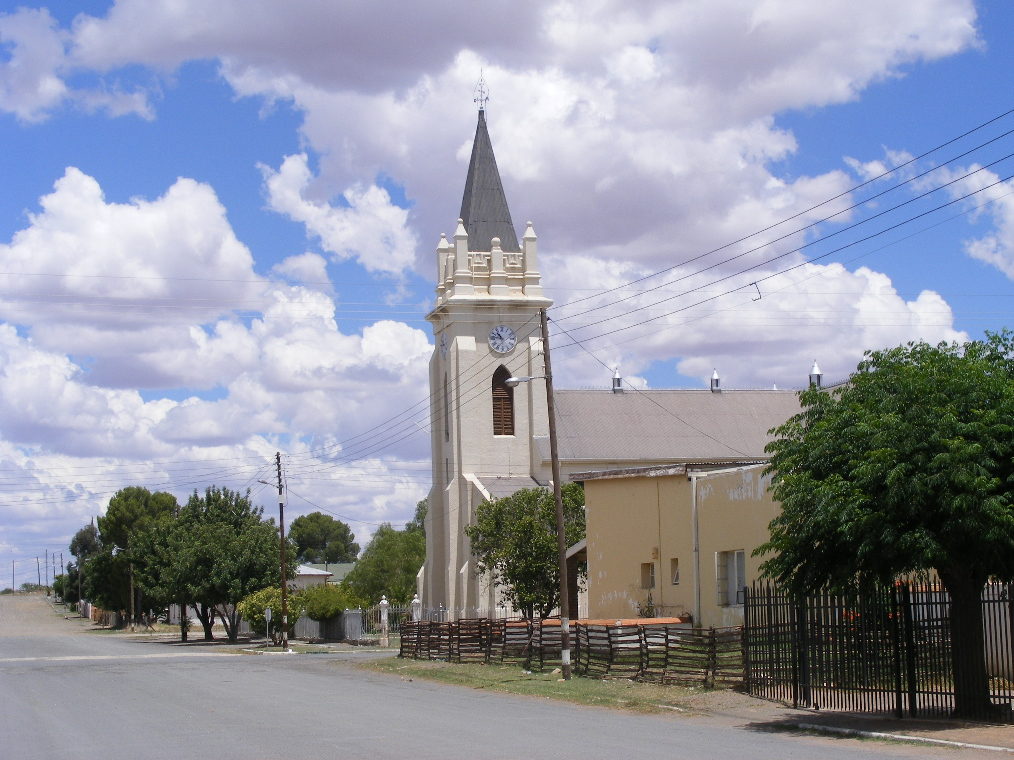
- Church in Britstown

- Location within Northern Cape Location within South Africa
- Coordinates: 30°35′S 23°30′E
- Country: South Africa
- Province: Northern Cape
- District: Pixley ka Seme
- Municipality: Emthanjeni

Area
  - Total: 62.6 km^{2} (24.2 sq mi)

Population (2011)
  - Total: 5,145
  - Density: 82.2/km^{2} (213/sq mi)

Racial makeup (2011)
  - Coloured: 68.4%
  - Black African: 26.7%
  - White: 4.0%
  - Indian/Asian: 0.4%
  - Other: 0.5%

First languages (2011)
  - Afrikaans: 80.9%
  - Xhosa: 13.8%
  - Sotho: 1.4%
  - English: 1.4%
  - Other: 2.5%
- Time zone: UTC+2 (SAST)
- Postal code (street): 8782
- PO box: 8782
- Area code: 053

Britstown is a small farming town situated in the Northern Cape province of South Africa, in the Pixley ka Seme District Municipality, Emthanjeni Local Municipality. The town is named after Hans Brits who settled here after he accompanied David Livingstone on a venture into the interior.

Britstown lies in the heart of the Central Karoo and is located exactly halfway between Cape Town (via Three Sisters) and Johannesburg (via Kimberley) on the N12 national route, and thus is about 700 km from both cities. The N10 national route crosses the N12 500m outside the town. De Aar is the closest big town and lies 50 km East from Britstown on the N10.

== History ==
In 1877 a community centre and a church was built on a section of Brits's farm. A private irrigation scheme was started by the Smartt Syndicate in 1885 and liquidated in 1954. The concern built two dams, planted lucerne and wheat. They grazed karakul sheep and Clydesdale horses. In 1961, floods destroyed the Smartt Irrigation Board Dam and it was rebuilt by the government in 1964.

== Railway ==
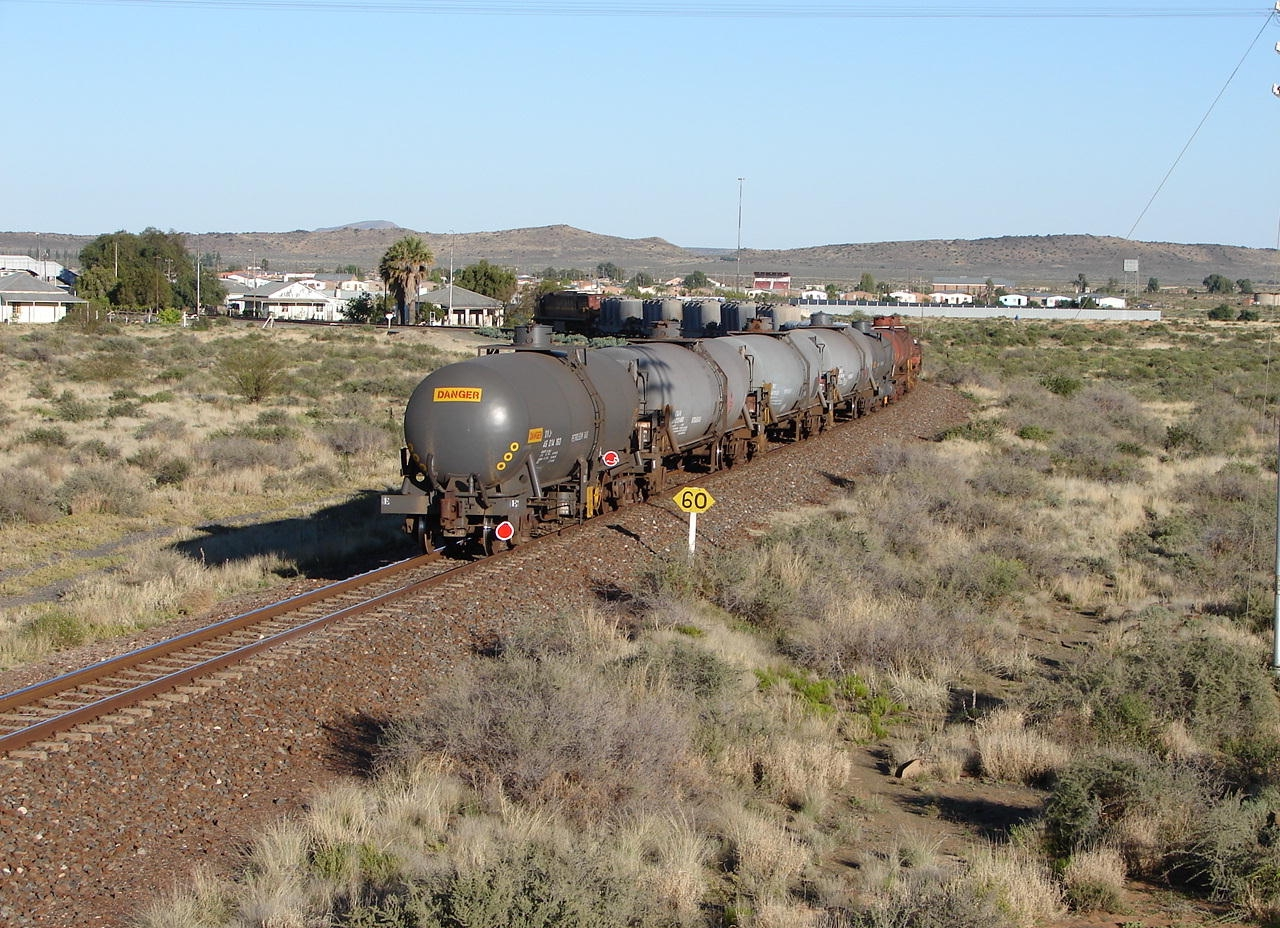
Prieska-bound train entering Britstown

The railway line from De Aar to Upington and Namibia passes through the town.

== Notable people ==
- Fritz Loots – Army general, founder of the South African Special Forces
- Louis Luyt – president of the South African Rugby Union, politician, businessman; founder of the Federal Alliance (South Africa) and The Citizen (South Africa).
- Thomas Smartt - politician
