= Oosthuizen (surname) =

Oosthuizen is a South African surname, especially common among Afrikaners. Notable people with the name include:

- Abrie Oosthuizen (fl. 1994–2013), South African politician
- Andries Oosthuizen (born c. 1954), South African golfer
- Caylib Oosthuizen (born 1989), South African rugby union player for the Tel Aviv Heat
- Coenie Oosthuizen (born 1989), South African rugby union player for Sale Sharks
- D. C. S. Oosthuizen (1926–1969; also known as Daantjie Oosthuizen), South African philosopher
- Etienne Oosthuizen (born 1992), South African rugby union player
- Etienne Oosthuizen (born 1994), South African rugby union player
- John Robert Oosthuizen (born 1987), South African javelin thrower
- Louis Oosthuizen (born 1982), South African professional golfer
- Ockie Oosthuizen (1955–2019), South African rugby union player
- Sarel Oosthuizen (1862–1900), Orange Free State Anglo-Boer War general
- Theo Oosthuizen (born 1964), South African rugby union player and coach
- Thomas Oosthuizen (born 1989), South African professional boxer

Also:

- Deon Oosthuysen (born 1963), South African rugby union player and coach

== See also ==
- Oosthuizen, a village in the Dutch province of North Holland
- Oosthuizen (1789 ship)
- Oosthuizen's blue (Lepidochrysops oosthuizeni) – a species of butterfly in the family Lycaenidae
