= South African Security Police =

South African Security Police may refer to:

- Security Branch (South Africa), also called Special Branch, a unit of the South African Police during Apartheid
- South African Bureau of State Security, a state security agency from 1966–1980
- South African Police, apartheid-era police force
- South African Police Service, post-apartheid police force
