= Michal Groenewald =

South African politician

Member of the North West Provincial Legislature
- Incumbent
- Assumed office TBD

Member of the National Assembly of South Africa
- In office 22 May 2019 – 28 May 2024

Personal details
- Born: Ignatius Michael Groenewald
- Party: Freedom Front Plus
- Relations: Pieter Groenewald (father)

Ignatius Michael "Michal" Groenewald is a South African politician who was elected to the North West Provincial Legislature in the 2024 provincial election. A member of the Freedom Front Plus (FF+), he is the party's provincial leader in the North West. Groenewald's father Pieter is the national leader of the Freedom Front Plus. He was previously a municipal councillor in the Matlosana Local Municipality and a member of parliament.
