= Republican Intelligence =

South African intelligence agency (1960–1969

Republican Intelligence (RI) was an intelligence agency and secret police force in South Africa from 1961 to 1969. It was established after South Africa became a republic and withdrew from the Commonwealth of Nations, cutting ties with British intelligence which had become weaker due to the system of Apartheid. RI was replaced by the South African Bureau of State Security (BOSS).

== Background ==
Prior to South Africa's departure from the Commonwealth and the creation of the Republic of South Africa on 31 May 1961, there was no effective intelligence service in the country. Prior to 1961, intelligence, if and when required, had been provided by British intelligence, after 1961 any remaining links between them ended.

The British authorities squashed any chance of an early national intelligence service, based on MI5, being created in 1938 as they feared that it would be infiltrated by nationalist Afrikaners, the Ossewabrandwag and Nazi sympathisers. Colonel Pierre de Villiers, Chief of South African Police and the countries liaison with MI5, approached MI5 in 1938 in an attempt to set up a security organisation based on the latter. They refused believing they were solely responsible for monitoring security in the Union and when intelligence gathering was reorganised in 1940, with internal security remaining the prerogative of the SAP now under Colonel Baston and not military intelligence, MI5 input with the SAP declined regarding the SAP as being corrupt and inefficient and some in elements, anti-British. Basic intelligence was provided by the Detective Branch of police and a fledgling intelligence unit in the Union Defence Force (UDF).

During the Second World War, the UDF formed the Department of Military Intelligence whose focus was on the white nationalists and Nazi sympathizers while an Intelligence Records Bureau was formed to collect, record and disseminate information fed to it by South African government organisations and British and colonial intelligence services. In September 1940, the Defence Advisory Committee, under the chairmanship of Denys Reitz, reported their concerns about the confusion, overlapping of information and delays when it came to the collection and distribution of intelligence. He suggested the creation of an organisation to centralise the collection, analysis and distribution of intelligence. Headed by Colonel Lenton weekly meeting were held and attended by representatives for censorship, intelligence, SAP, railway police, treasury, immigration and customs.

By 1948, the National Party of nationalist Afrikaners had won the election and by the early 1950s, the first apartheid laws were introduced in South Africa. MI5, seeing the new governments anti-communist credentials, initially thought of establishing a new intelligence service in South Africa styled on its own structure as it had done with ASIO in Australia, but had second thoughts fearing it would be used to suppress and oppress opposition in the country.

What was recommended instead was the formation of a Special Branch within the South African Police later to be called the Security Branch. This branch would be responsible for internal security and the gathering of intelligence freed from criminal investigation.

The beginning of the sixties in South Africa was a turbulent time beginning with the Sharpeville Massacre which led to the anti-apartheid organisations of the African National Congress (ANC) and the South African Communist Party (SACP) being banned and with that their departure from passive resistance and declaring the beginnings of the 'armed struggle'. A year later in 1961, the ANC formed their armed wing, Umkhonto we Sizwe (MK), and begun their sabotage campaign in December the same year while left-wing white radicals such as the African Resistance Movement begun bombing. These events saw the need for a more effective intelligence service than could be provided by the Security Branch of the South African Police.

== Formation ==
In 1960, Hendrik van den Bergh was appointed as the Head of the Security Branch. By 1963, he would form the Republican Intelligence a secretive offshoot of the Security Branch. It would become bogged down in internal security matters, and could not become an effective external intelligence gathering and analysis organisation. RI was initially based in Johannesburg before eventually moving to the Wachthuis, the police headquarters in Pretoria. Reporting to Van den Bergh, overall command of RI lay with Brigadier P.J "Tiny" Venter while the day-to-day running of RI was conducted by Mike Geldenhuys. Most recruits for the new organisation had their origins in South African Police's Security Branch, with the recruits resigning from their previous positions and re-employed in Front organisations in the main South African cities. Apart from offices based in South Africa, RI had stations based in overseas South African embassies such as Washington, D.C., London, Paris and Vienna.

== Dissolution ==
During the middle of 1968, the South African cabinet approved the implementation of a centralised security service. On 28 August of the same year, Van den Bergh was instructed to start planning the new organisation. It aimed at gathering intelligence on internal and external threats and provide national security intelligence. On 1 October 1968, Van den Bergh, as Deputy Police Commissioner and Head of the Security Branch, was promoted from lieutenant-general to general and then appointed as Security Advisor to Prime Minister John Vorster. Attached to the Prime Minister's office, he would be in command all security and intelligence chiefs in the country including the military, and reported only to Vorster. He would set about forming the Bureau of State Security and merging some of RI's personnel into the new organisation, drawing others from military intelligence and the security branch of the police.
