= Robert Smit =

South African politician

- Born: Robert van Schalkwyk Smit c. 1933
- Died: 22 November 1977 (aged 44); Springs, Transvaal, South Africa
- Cause of death: Gunshots
- Occupation(s): Economist, National Party politician

Robert van Schalkwyk Smit (1933–1977) was an economist and parliamentary candidate for South Africa's National Party, tipped as a future Minister of Finance. He was murdered, along with his wife Jean-Cora, on 22 November 1977. No arrests have ever been made, and there was little evidence in the case, but the murders are widely suspected to have been politically motivated. Cabinet Minister Pik Botha described it as "one of the most haunting criminal mysteries in our country", and the police investigation remained open as of November 2012.

== Life and career ==
Smit attended Pembroke College, Oxford, on a Rhodes Scholarship and received a doctorate in economics from Stellenbosch University. He was a member of the National Party, which governed in South Africa throughout apartheid, and in 1967, aged 34, he was appointed Deputy Secretary of Finance. From 1971 to 1975, he was South Africa's ambassador to the International Monetary Fund in Washington D.C. He returned to South Africa to work for Santam, a major South African insurance company, and to campaign for the November 1977 national elections, in which he was standing as the National Party candidate for the Springs constituency, near Johannesburg. He was considered a rising star in the party and was expected to be appointed to high office after the elections, possibly even to the Ministry of Finance. At the time of his death, he and his wife, Jean-Cora, were staying in a rented house in Selcourt, Springs; their two teenaged children were in Pretoria.

== Death ==
On 22 November 1977, Smit and his wife were shot dead in their rental home in Springs. Jean-Cora had already been shot by the time Smit arrived home from the office in the evening. She was shot in the chest, in the thigh, and in the back of the head at close range, with a 0.32 calibre gun. He was shot in the doorway, in the neck, head, back and chest, with a 0.38 calibre gun. Jean-Cora was also stabbed 14 times with a stiletto, and Smit once, in the back. It has been described as "an extremely professional hit." The Smits' driver discovered their bodies the next morning and also discovered that the letters "RAU TEM" had been written in red spray paint across the fridge and kitchen walls.

== Murder investigation ==
=== Popular theories ===
The most popular theory about the Smits' murders is that they were carried out by the South African security forces, probably at the behest of a high-level politician or official. In particular, since 1977, there has been a persistent rumour that Smit had uncovered large-scale corruption or fraud in the state and planned to expose it. Smit had reportedly told several people that he was in possession of "explosive" information which he planned to share. This theory first emerged in December 1977, when the Sunday Express reported that police were considering the possibility that Smit had been murdered after uncovering a foreign currency racket. After the Information Scandal broke in 1978, rumours circulated that Smit had been killed because he had known about the secret slush fund used, with Prime Minister John Vorster's authorisation, to fund the state's covert propaganda campaign. Other theories proffered have included that Smit was in possession of information relating to South Africa's nuclear programme, to South Africa's sanctions-busting activities, or to an assassination plot against Foreign Minister Pik Botha.

The Bureau for State Security (BOSS) has also become persistently associated with the murders in the popular imagination. BOSS was a central player in the Information Scandal, and was alleged to include a unit, the so-called Z-Squad, which carried out extra-judicial killings in the 1970s. In 1997, Roy Allen, a former member of BOSS, was named as the chief suspect in the murder case, although he denied the allegations and said that he had not belonged to the so-called Z-Squad. Then, almost a decade later, the Beeld reported, on the basis of information from an anonymous source in the intelligence services, that Allen and two alleged former Z-Squad members – Dries Verwey and Phil Freeman – had carried out the murders, to prevent Smit from publicly disclosing his knowledge about secret overseas bank accounts that were held by the state to pay front organisations. However, no charges were ever laid: Verwey had died in 1980; Freeman had committed suicide in 1990; and Allen was by then living in Australia. It has also been alleged that the police investigations into the murders were in fact orchestrated to cover up the involvement of the security forces, and attention has also been given to the possibility that Smit was murdered by a Cuban hit squad.

=== Truth and Reconciliation Commission ===
After the end of apartheid, Truth and Reconciliation Commission heard evidence on the Smits' murders. Its report said that the evidence suggested that some party retained "a contemporary interest in ensuring that the facts surrounding the killings remain hidden", indicating "a political agenda or at least one in which powerful – possibly financial – interests are vested". It concluded that the murders had been politically motivated and carried out by members of the apartheid security forces.
