= Gerald Sparrow =

British lawyer, judge and travel writer (1903–1988)

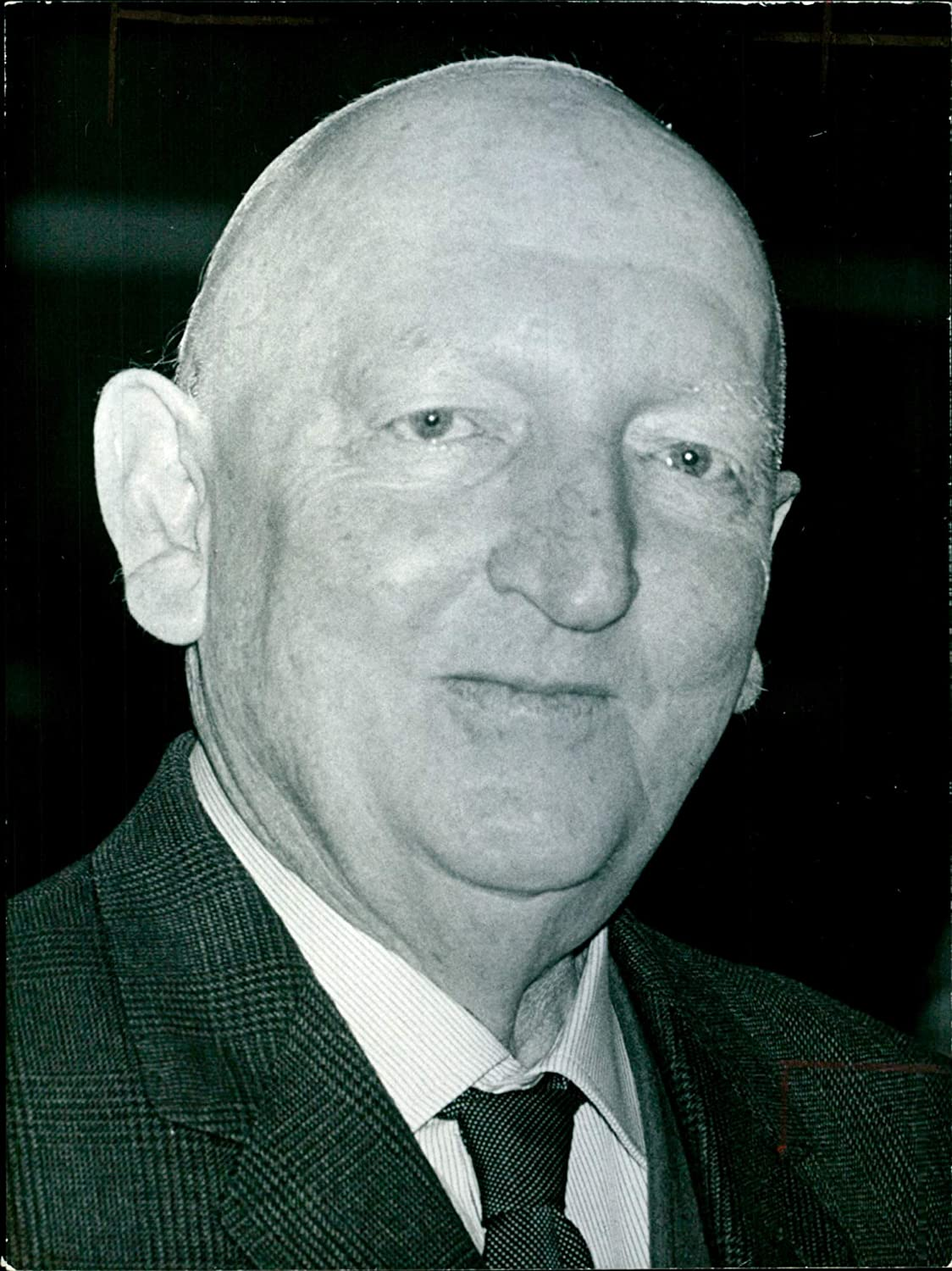
- Sparrow in 1967
- Born: 22 January 1903
- Died: 22 August 1988 (aged 85)
- Education: University of Cambridge
- Occupations: Lawyer, judge, travel writer

John Walter Gerald Sparrow (22 January 1903 – 22 August 1988) was a British lawyer, judge and travel writer. He served on the International Court in Bangkok, Thailand, for over 20 years. He was the president of the Club of Ten, a pro-apartheid organization, and the author of over 40 books.

== Early life ==
Gerald Sparrow was born in 1903 in Chapel-en-le-Frith, Derbyshire. He attended Sherborne School in Dorset, then Trinity Hall, Cambridge. He was the president of the Cambridge Union Society.

== Career ==
Sparrow practised as a barrister in Manchester in the mid-1920s, then (invited by the Crown Prince) emigrated to Siam (now Thailand), where he was appointed, in 1930 and aged only 26 or 27, as a judge on the International Court (which tried cases involving non-Thais) in Bangkok. He served on the court "for two decades" and lived in Thailand for 23 years. In 1941, during the Second World War, the Japanese invaded Thailand, and Sparrow was interned under harsh conditions. After the war, Sparrow resigned as a judge and opened a private law office in Bangkok, dealing mainly in commercial law. In the 1950s, he retired to England, where he became well known for his books, particularly the long series entitled The Great Forgers, The Great Traitors etc., which mixed famous and infamous criminal cases (and a few civil cases) from history with other cases which Sparrow knew, often personally, from his time in Thailand.

He was the author of "over forty books, mostly about travel".

Sparrow was the president of the Club of Ten, a pro-apartheid organization whose members included South African, British, American businessmen. One of them was Lampas Nichas, a "South African fertiliser millionaire." However, the club was founded by Connie Mulder and Eschel Rhoodie, and the real aim was to publish "advertisements in the newspapers and otherwise do publicity work extolling the policies of the South African government". Sparrow opposed the sporting boycott of South Africa in 1974. He later recanted his views.

== Personal life ==
In 1929, in England, Sparrow married Barbara Ethel Thompson. He later married secondly a Thai. He died in Bromley, Greater London, in August 1988.

== Honours ==
- Grand Officer, Order of the White Elephant, 1940

== Selected works ==
- Sparrow, Gerald (1956). The Sphinx Awakes. London, U.K.: Hale. OCLC 477852.
- Sparrow, Gerald (1959). The Great Swindlers. London, U.K.: John Long.
- Sparrow, Gerald (1960). Hussein of Jordan. London, U.K.: George G. Harrap and Co. OCLC 1632383.
- Sparrow, Gerald (1961). Modern Jordan. London, U.K.: Allen & Unwin. OCLC 2677978.
- Sparrow, Gerald (1961). Not Wisely But Too Well. London, U.K.: George G. Harrap and Co. OCLC 250857508.
- Sparrow, Gerald (1962). Gordon: Mandarin and Pasha. London, U.K.: Jarrolds. OCLC 398468.
- Sparrow, Gerald (1962). The Great Imposters. London, U.K.: John Long.
- Sparrow, Gerald (1963). The Great Forgers. London, U.K.: John Long.
- Sparrow, Gerald (1963). The Golden Orchid. London, U.K.: Jarrolds.
- Sparrow, Gerald (1964). The Great Abductors. London, U.K.: John Long.
- Sparrow, Gerald (1965). The Great Traitors. London, U.K.: John Long.
- Sparrow, Gerald (1965). "R.A.B.": Study of a Statesman, the Career of Baron Butler of Saffron Walden, C.H. London, U.K.: Odhams Books. OCLC 2584959.
- Sparrow, Gerald (1967). The Great Deceivers. London, U.K.: John Long.
- Sparrow, Gerald (1968). Gang-warfare: A Probe into the Changing Pattern of British Crime. London, U.K.: Feature Books. ISBN 9780283354632. OCLC 39716.
- Sparrow, Gerald (1968). The Great Defenders. London, U.K.: John Long.
- Sparrow, Gerald (1968). The Great Assassins. London, U.K.: John Long.
- Sparrow, Gerald (1969). The Great Conspirators. London, U.K.: John Long.
- Sparrow, Gerald (1969). The Great Spies. London, U.K.: John Long.
- Sparrow, Gerald (1970). The Great Defamers. London, U.K.: John Long. ISBN 9780091047009.
- Sparrow, Gerald (1972). The Great Persecutors. London, U.K.: John Long. ISBN 9780091115401.
- Sparrow, Gerald (1972). The Great Intimidators. London, U.K.: John Long. ISBN 9780091095000.
- Sparrow, Gerald (1974). The Great Judges. London, U.K.: John Long. ISBN 9780091181901. OCLC 1057391.
- Sparrow, Gerald (1974). Crime for the Connoisseur. London, U.K.: Leslie Frewin. ISBN 9780856320699.
- Sparrow, Gerald (1974). An Invitation to South Africa. London, U.K.: Neville Spearman. ISBN 9780854353422.
- Sparrow, Gerald (1975). The Con-men. London, U.K.: Arthur Barker. ISBN 9780213165239.
- Sparrow, Gerald (1979). How to Get Your Book Published. London, U.K.: Bachman & Turner. ISBN 9780859740944.
