= Hendrik van den Bergh =

Hendrik van den Bergh may refer to:

- Hendrik van den Bergh (count) (1573-1638), Dutch count, who served in the Spanish military
- Hendrik van den Bergh (police official) (1914-1997), South African police official
