= Breedt =

Breedt is a surname. Notable people with the surname include:

- Jannie Breedt (born 1959), South African rugby union player
- Tammy Breedt (born 1986), South African politician
