= Pieter Groenewald =

South African politician

The Honourable Pieter Groenewald MP
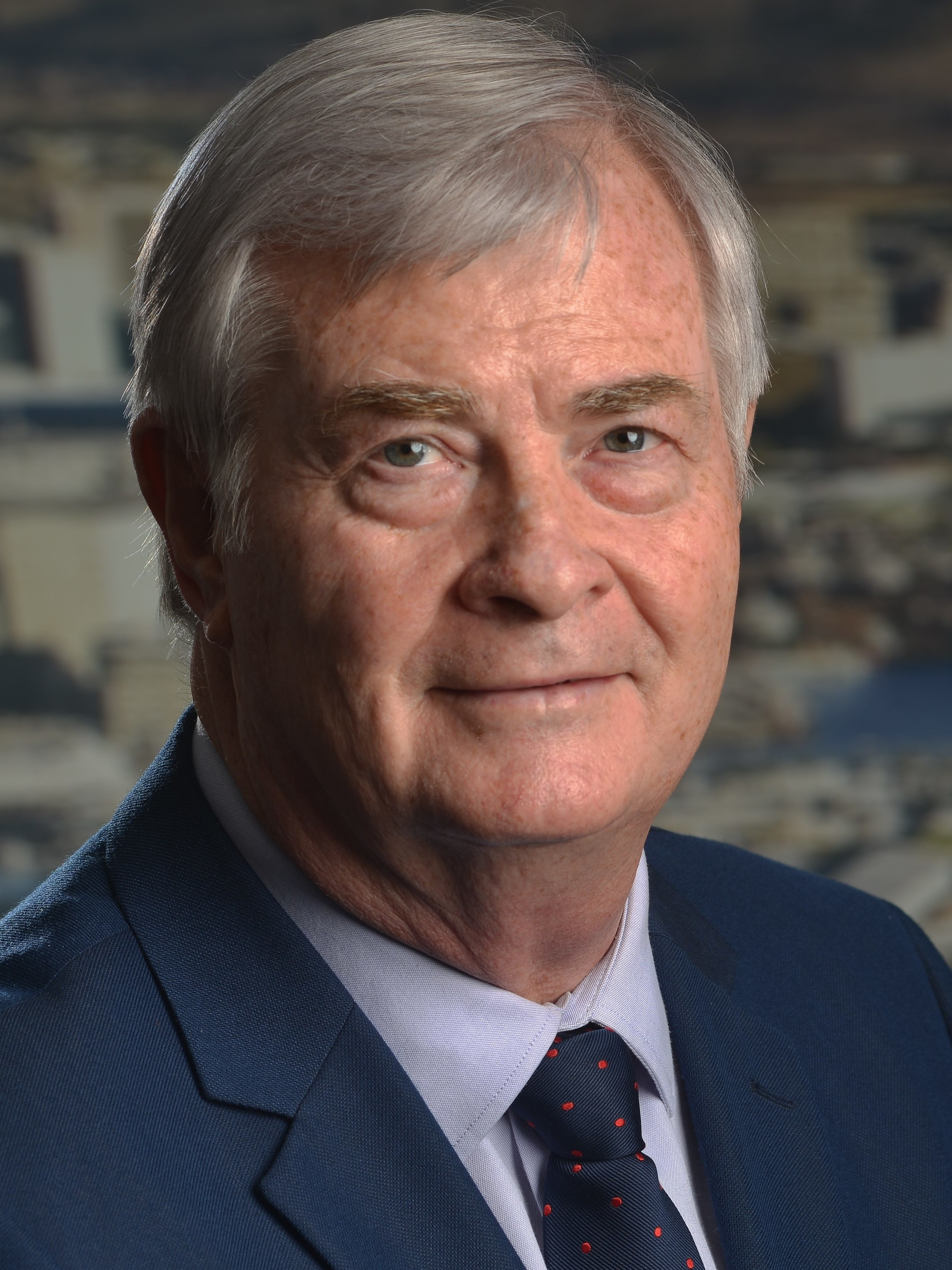
- Groenewald in 2018

Minister of Correctional Services
- Incumbent
- Assumed office 3 July 2024
- President: Cyril Ramaphosa
- Deputy: Lindiwe Ntshalintshali
- Preceded by: Ronald Lamola as Minister of Justice and Correctional Services

Leader of the Freedom Front Plus
- In office 12 November 2016 – 22 February 2025
- Preceded by: Pieter Mulder
- Succeeded by: Corné Mulder

Member of the National Assembly of South Africa
- Incumbent
- Assumed office 2001
- In office 1994–1999

Member of the House of Assembly of South Africa for Stilfontein
- In office 1989–1994

Federal Chairperson of the Freedom Front Plus
- In office 11 August 2011 – 12 November 2016
- Preceded by: Abrie Oosthuizen
- Succeeded by: Anton Alberts

Provincial Leader of the Freedom Front Plus in the North West
- In office March 1994 – March 2017
- Preceded by: Position established
- Succeeded by: Michal Groenewald

Personal details
- Born: 27 August 1955 (age 71) Fochville, Transvaal, South Africa
- Party: Freedom Front Plus
- Other political affiliations: Conservative Party (old)
- Spouse: Hedwig Groenewald
- Children: Michal Groenewald
- Education: Potchefstroom University for Christian Higher Education

Petrus Johannes "Pieter" Groenewald (born 27 August 1955) is a South African politician who is currently serving as Minister of Correctional Services since July 2024. He served as the Leader of the Freedom Front Plus from November 2016 until February 2025. He started his political career by being elected Mayor of Stilfontein in 1988. He relinquished the position in 1989 due to his election to the House of Assembly. Groenewald co-founded the Freedom Front in 1994, and served as a Member of the National Assembly until his election to the North West Provincial Legislature in 1999. He returned to the National Assembly in 2001.

Groenewald's son, Michal, also serves as public representative for the party.

== Early life ==
Pieter Groenewald was born in South Africa. He achieved a B.luris degree from the Potchefstroom University for Christian Higher Education. Other degrees that Groenewald has obtained include a Postgraduate Diploma in Communications, a master's degree in Management and Development, and a Doctorate in Politics.

== Political career ==
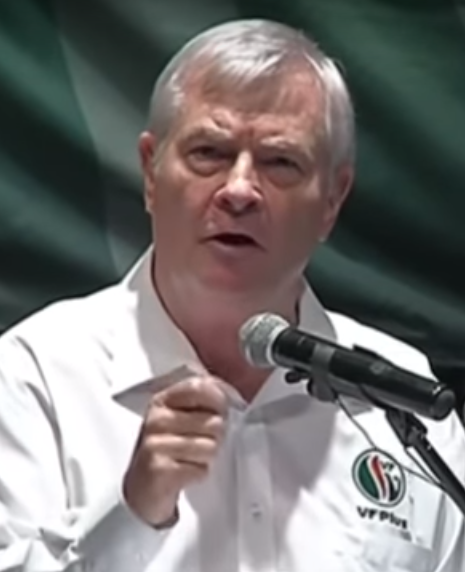
Groenewald delivering a speech at his party's 2019 election manifesto launch

Groenewald was elected Mayor of Stilfontein in 1988. At the South African general election of 1989, he was elected to the House of Assembly of South Africa for the Stilfontein constituency.

In March 1994, Groenewald co-founded the Freedom Front, a minority rights and pro-Afrikaner nationalism political party. He was elected to the newly-established National Assembly in April of the same year. He served as a Member of Parliament until he was elected to the North West Provincial Legislature in 1999. He served as a North West MPL from 1999 until he returned to the National Assembly in 2001.

Groenewald has held various leadership positions in the Freedom Front Plus, such as Parliamentary Leader and Federal Chairperson from 11 August 2011 until 12 November 2016. He was also the Provincial Leader of the party in the North West from March 1994 to March 2017.

On 12 November 2016, Groenewald was elected Leader of the Freedom Front Plus, succeeding Pieter Mulder, who retired from the position. Advocate Anton Alberts succeeded Groenewald as Federal Chairperson.

Groenewald led the Freedom Front Plus to achieve its best election result in the 2019 general election. The party increased its vote share to 2.38% of the national vote, earning it ten seats in the National Assembly, its highest representation in the National Assembly since its founding in 1994. Additionally, the party won representation in eight of the nine provincial legislatures and largely improved its showing in the provinces of Gauteng and the North West.

Following the 2024 general election, Groenewald was appointed as Minister of Correctional Services by president Cyril Ramaphosa with effect 3 July 2024. Groenewald was then succeeded by Corné Mulder as parliamentary leader of the party in July 2024 before being succeeded by him as party leader in February 2025. However, Groenewald remained in his ministerial position.
