= Abrie Oosthuizen =

South African politician

Member of the Free State Provincial Legislature
- In office 1994 – October 2013

Personal details
- Party: Freedom Front Plus
- Spouse: Karin

Abrie Oosthuizen is a South African former politician who served as the provincial leader of the Freedom Front Plus in the Free State and as a member of the Free State Provincial Legislature until his retirement. Oosthuizen was elected to the Provincial Legislature in 1994 and was re-elected in 1999, 2004 and 2009 before announcing his retirement from politics in October 2013. Wouter Wessels succeeded him in the legislature while Jan van Niekerk succeeded him as provincial leader.
