= Pieter Mulder =

South African politician

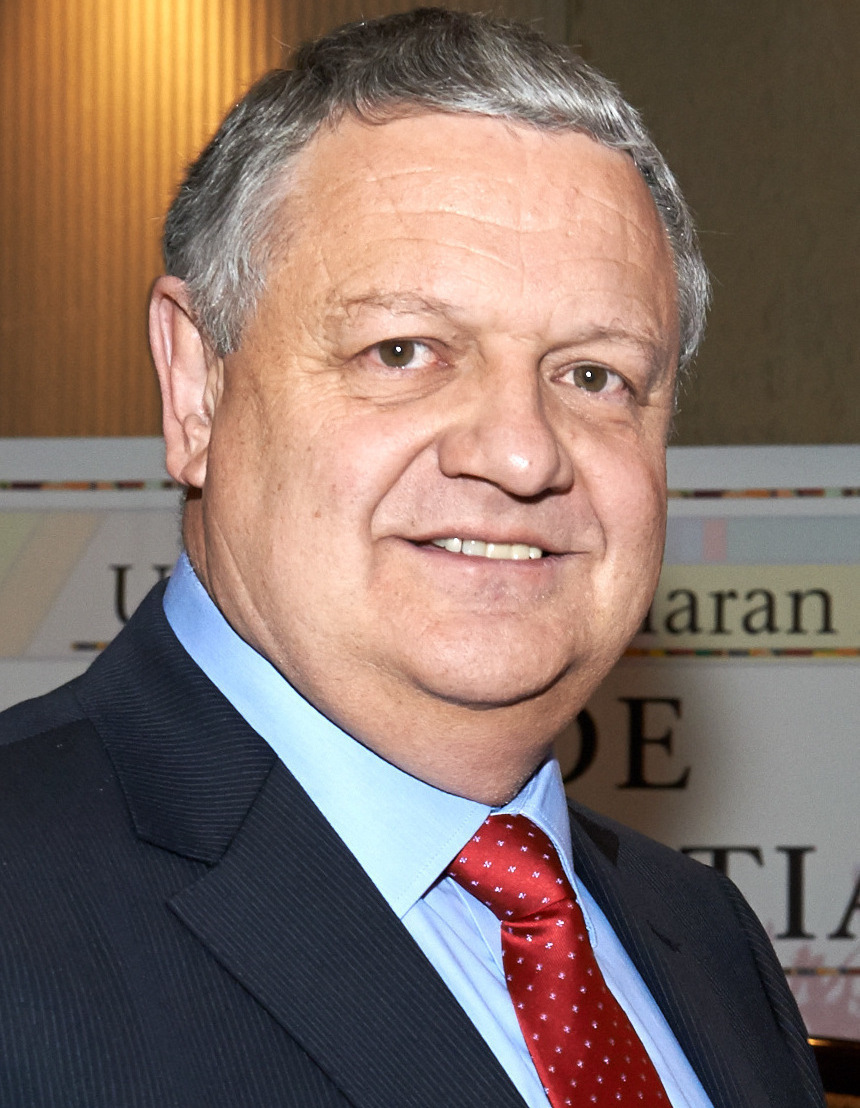
- Mulder in 2013

South African Deputy Minister of Agriculture, Forestry and Fisheries
- In office 11 May 2009 – 25 May 2014
- President: Jacob Zuma
- Preceded by: Dirk du Toit
- Succeeded by: Bheki Cele

Leader of the Freedom Front Plus
- In office 26 June 2001 – 12 November 2016
- Preceded by: Constand Viljoen
- Succeeded by: Pieter Groenewald

South African Member of Parliament
- In office 1988 – 1 December 2017

Personal details
- Born: 26 July 1951 (age 74) Randfontein, Transvaal, South Africa
- Party: Freedom Front Plus
- Other political affiliations: Conservative Party of South Africa
- Spouse: Triena Mulder
- Relations: Connie Mulder (father), Corné Mulder (brother)
- Children: 5

Pieter Willem Adriaan Mulder (born 26 July 1951) is a South African politician and the former leader of the Freedom Front Plus. He served as the Deputy Minister of Agriculture, Forestry and Fisheries in the Cabinet of President Jacob Zuma from 2009–14.

== Biography ==
=== Early life and politics ===
Mulder was born in Randfontein and grew up in Randfontein and Cape Town. He completed his secondary education at Riebeeck High School in Randfontein, where he was head boy and Victor Ludorum in athletics. The son of former Cabinet minister Connie Mulder, Pieter first worked as a lecturer at the Potchefstroom University for Christian Higher Education, before being promoted to head of the university's communications department. He represented the town of Potchefstroom in Parliament for nearly thirty years from 1988–2017, initially elected as an MP for the Conservative Party (KP). He was elected for Schweizer-Reneke in the House of Assembly of South Africa in 1989.

=== Freedom Front ===
Prior to South Africa's first non-racial election in 1994, Mulder co-founded the Freedom Front with General Constand Viljoen, a former head of the South African Defence Force. At the election in 1994, the Freedom Front won nine seats in the National Assembly. This number was reduced to three at the 1999 general election. Viljoen, who acted as the leader since the party's founding, retired from politics in 2001 and Mulder succeeded him.

=== Deputy Minister and Leader of the Freedom Front Plus ===
In 2004, under Mulder's leadership, the Freedom Front was renamed Freedom Front Plus after absorbing the smaller Conservative Party, the Afrikaner Eenheidsbeweging (Afrikaner Unity Movement), which lost its only seat in the National Assembly due to floor-crossing, and the Federal Alliance of Dr. Louis Luyt. At the 2004 general election, the new "Freedom Front Plus" managed to gain four seats in the National Assembly.

On 10 May 2009, President Jacob Zuma announced his appointment of Mulder as the Deputy Minister of Agriculture, Forestry and Fisheries. Mulder served until May 2014, when he was replaced by former Police Commissioner Bheki Cele.

Mulder stepped down as leader of the Freedom Front Plus in late-2016, and was replaced by fellow MP Pieter Groenewald. He remained a member of parliament until December 2017.
