= Heloïse Denner =

South African politician

Heloïse Denner MP
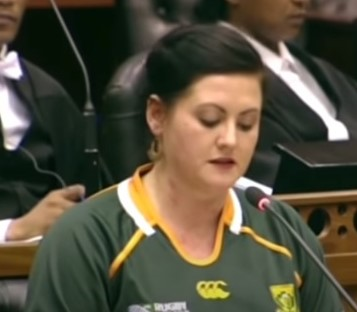

Member of the National Assembly of South Africa
- Incumbent
- Assumed office 22 May 2019

Personal details
- Born: Heloïse Jordaan
- Party: Freedom Front Plus
- Committees: Portfolio Committee on Employment and Labour

Heloïse Denner (née Jordaan) is a South African politician and attorney. She is a member of the Freedom Front Plus (FF+) and a representative of the party in the National Assembly of South Africa. In 2019, she and Tammy Wessels became the first women to represent the party in Parliament.
