= Wouter Wessels =

South African politician

Wouter Wessels MP
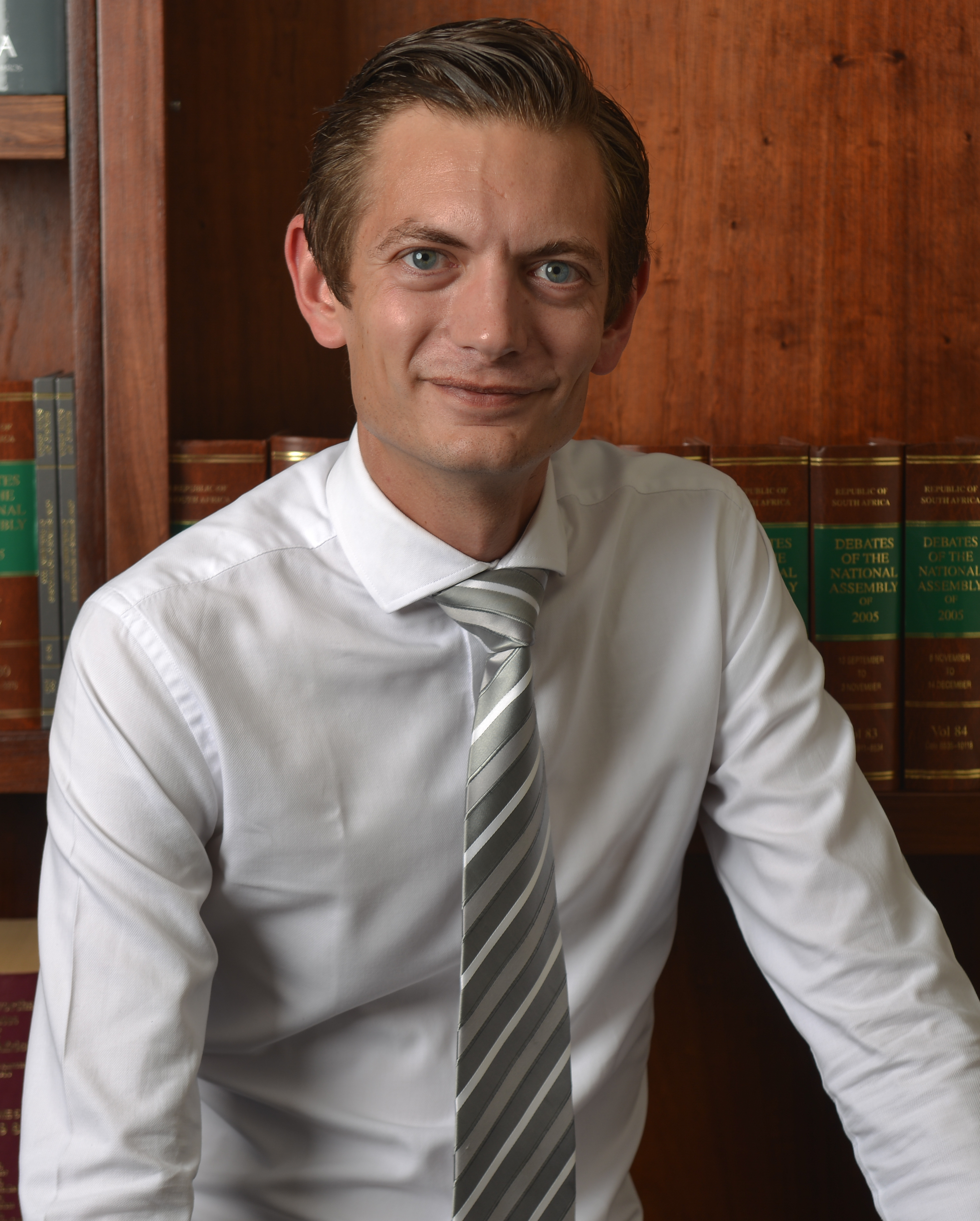

Member of the National Assembly of South Africa
- Incumbent
- Assumed office 1 December 2017

Member of the Free State Provincial Legislature
- In office 2013–2017

Personal details
- Born: 18 March 1985 (age 41) East London, South Africa
- Party: Freedom Front Plus
- Education: Hoërskool Grens
- Alma mater: University of the Free State
- Occupation: Politician

Wouter Wynand Wessels (born 18 March 1985) is a South African politician and a Member of the National Assembly of South Africa for the Freedom Front Plus (FF Plus). He is also the chairperson of Parliament's Standing Committee on the Auditor General. He took office as an MP on 1 December 2017 and succeeded the former party leader Pieter Mulder, who resigned from Parliament a day earlier.

== Early life ==
Wessels was born on 18 March 1985 in East London, South Africa. He matriculated from Grens High School (Afrikaans: Hoërskool Grens) and subsequently studied at the University of the Free State. He was the FF Plus's campus leader.

== Career ==
After university, he worked for the FF Plus in the Free State. He became the personal secretary to party leader Pieter Mulder following his appointment as a deputy minister in the cabinet of South Africa. He served in the post for five years from 2009 to 2014.

He serves as the deputy leader of the FF Plus in the Free State and is the party's head of elections. Wessels is a member of the party's federal council, the federal executive and the national executive committee. He was the national youth leader of the FF Plus.

Wessels became a Member of the Free State Provincial Legislature in 2013. He returned to the provincial legislature following the 2014 elections. Pieter Mulder resigned from Parliament in November 2017. Wessels was then appointed to the National Assembly to take up Mulder's seat. His wife, Tammy, filled his seat in the provincial legislature.

He was re-elected as an MP in May 2019. His wife, Tammy, was also appointed as an MP for the FF Plus. Wessels was re-elected to the National Assembly in the 2024 general election.

== Personal life ==
Wessels married Tammy Breedt in 2015. They were the victims of a home burglary in 2018. In his free time, he enjoys watching 'Schuks Tshabalala's Survival Guide to South Africa'.
