= Muldergate =

South African politician scandal

The Muldergate scandal, also known as the Information Scandal or Infogate, was a South African political scandal involving a secret propaganda campaign conducted by the apartheid Department of Information. It centred on revelations about the department's use of a multi-million rand secret slush fund, channelled from the defence budget, to fund an ambitious series of projects in publishing, media relations, public relations, lobbying, and diplomacy. Most ambitiously, the fund was used to establish a new pro-government newspaper, the Citizen, and in attempts to purchase both the Rand Daily Mail and the Washington Star. The projects, involving a total amount of at least $72 million (over $300 million in 2021 terms), aimed primarily to counter negative perceptions of the South African government in foreign countries, especially in the West.

The scandal broke in 1977 and implicated the Prime Minister, B. J. Vorster. Also centrally involved in "Project Annemarie" were Eschel Rhoodie, Secretary of Information; Connie Mulder, Minister of Information, and a rising star in the National Party; and Hendrik van den Bergh, the Head of the Bureau for State Security. A series of internal investigations, inquiries, and media exposés culminated in the resignation in disgrace of all four men. In fact, during the course of the scandal, Vorster resigned twice, first from the Prime Ministership and then from the State Presidency. P. W. Botha, Vorster's successor as Prime Minister, was Minister of Defence throughout Project Annemarie's lifespan and was implicated in facilitating the slush fund, but he was ultimately cleared of all wrongdoing. Rhoodie was prosecuted for fraud and theft, and one other participant, American media magnate John P. McGoff, also faced criminal charges related to the scandal.

== Background ==
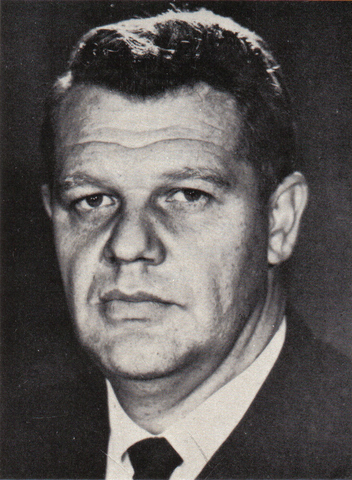
Minister Connie Mulder, for whom the scandal is named

In the early 1970s, public perceptions of the South African government, arising from apartheid and concomitant brutalities, were felt to endanger its reputation abroad, and thus to endanger important trade and financial links. Sectors of the South African state, and Prime Minister B. J. Vorster, worried about South Africa's increasing isolation in the international arena, which was the result of an array of domestic and international factors. Particular concerns were the intensification of sports boycotts and the intensification of calls, especially by the British Anti-Apartheid Movement, for economic sanctions and boycotts.

Diplomatic press officer Eschel Rhoodie had written a book on South Africa's global positioning. In 1971 he helped the government to establish a pro-South African news magazine, To the Point, published internationally and supported financially by the state and by its Dutch publisher. The project was authorised by Vorster; by the Minister of Information, Connie Mulder; and by Hendrik van den Bergh of the Bureau for State Security (BOSS), which also helped with its funding.

In September 1972, Mulder appointed Rhoodie Secretary of Information – the Department of Information's head of "dirty tricks," on some accounts. Under him, the department began to pursue a concerted communications and propaganda programme. By early 1973, the department had allegedly been involved in the following, funded partly by loans from BOSS:

- The establishment of a Committee for Fairness in Sport, a front organisation which addressed sports boycotts;
- The establishment of a front business organisation under Gerald Sparrow called the Club of Ten, which criticised what it alleged was bias in attitudes toward the apartheid government;
- The establishment of a covert photo news agency, which distributed articles and photos to the European press;
- The purchase of a small French newspaper, Le Monde Moderne;
- A smear campaign against liberal politicians in the United Kingdom, including Peter Hain;
- Contracts with two Labour Party Members of Parliament for lobbying and spying; and
- A January 1974 visit to the United States, involving meetings with top politicians and the New York Times.

== Project Annemarie ==
From December 1973, these initiatives were expanded and formalised. The department's new approach was to be "a no-holds-barred secret campaign of psychological warfare against foreign opinion." Vorster later said that the purpose was "to assist in a delicate and unconventional way in combating the total onslaught against South Africa," and "to withstand the subversion of our country's good image and stability." A slush fund was set up in collaboration with the Minister of Defence P. W. Botha – money was channelled to the Department of Information through the secret Defence Special Account. From April 1974, BOSS acted as banker for the Project, but the involvement of the Department of Defence was necessary to avoid the perception of inflation in BOSS's own budget. The programme, named Project Annemarie, after Rhoodie's daughter, mainly targeted Western countries, and involved 180 initiatives at an estimated cost of between R65 million and R85 million, or between $73 million and $76 million, over five years. Participants said it included:

- Backdoor diplomacy with African countries and with Israel;
- Purchase of a 50 percent interest in UPITN, a television news service based in London;
- Extensive use of lobbying groups in the United States;
- Contributions toward the 1976 electoral defeats of Senators John Tunney and Dick Clark, who opposed American involvement in the Angolan War;
- The establishment of publication firms for propaganda distributed locally and internationally, including in foreign universities;
- The establishment of front organisations for research, for transferring money abroad, and for hosting foreign guests in South Africa;
- Pamphlet bombs in townships after the 1976 Soweto uprising; and
- An attempt to establish black film theatres.

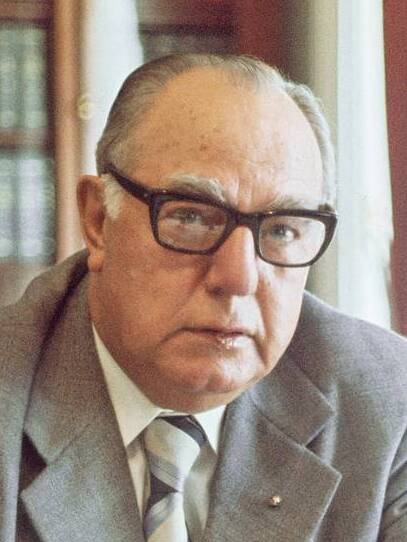
Prime Minister B. J. Vorster later denied that he had been consulted on the Citizen scheme

=== The Citizen ===
The Project had initially planned to arrange the sale of the Rand Daily Mail, the most staunchly anti-apartheid national newspaper of the era, to Louis Luyt, a conservative business tycoon who would steer the paper in a more sympathetic editorial direction. When shareholders refused to sell to Luyt, the Project decided to establish an entirely new pro-government, but ostensibly independent, English-language newspaper. The Citizen was founded in 1976, at substantial expense, under Luyt, and recruited several popular conservative journalists. It lost significant amounts of money, and an overdraft facility had to be arranged. The Citizen is estimated to have cost the state R32 million or $37 million by the time Luyt pulled out in 1977. On some views, the eventual scandal "discredited" the Citizen, which is still operational, for some years afterward.

=== The Washington Star ===
In 1974, the Project also attempted to facilitate the sale of the American Washington Star, with similar plans to sway its editorial policy toward a favourable view of the South African government. The intention was probably to use the newspaper to influence American foreign policy on South Africa and to attack liberal Democrats. Luyt's counterpart in this unsuccessful bid was right-wing media magnate John P. McGoff, who was provided $11.3 million in Project funds with which to purchase the Star. McGoff went on to use part of the funds to purchase an interest in the Sacramento Union, and was ultimately investigated and charged by the American Department of Justice for acting as the agent of a foreign nation.

== Public scandal ==
[T]he Department of Information has, for years, been asked by the government to undertake sensitive and even highly secret operations as counteraction to the propaganda war being waged against South Africa.

— Secretary of Information Eschel Rhoodie in May 1978

In mid-1977, the department was audited by the state Auditor-General, led by the former Secretary of Information, Gerald Barrie. Barrie reported to Vorster about financial irregularities and the mismanagement of state funds at the department. Over the next two years, revelations about the department's activities and secret propaganda campaign emerged through a series of official inquiries and in the press. The Rand Daily Mail under Allister Sparks and the Sunday Express under Rex Gibson broke the story and were particularly active in investigating it.

At least in conservative society and within the ruling National Party, the scandal was less about the fact of a state propaganda campaign than about the mismanagement of state funds, appropriated without the knowledge of Parliament, and an apparent cover-up by senior government officials and elected representatives. It emerged, through the state audit and other sources, that Project Annemarie funds had been transferred to private bank accounts and used to fund extravagant trips abroad by Project officials. Deceit by participants became a prominent issue in 1978, when attention turned to the financing of the Citizen. In this regard, Mulder faced particular public censure – in May 1978, responding to a parliamentary question from opposition politician Japie Basson, he had denied outright that the Citizen had been financed with state funds, thereby lying to Parliament.

=== Official inquiries ===
==== Parliamentary inquiry ====
At the end of January 1978, amid widely circulated rumours inflamed by media reports, Parliament's Committee on Public Accounts, chaired by Hennie van der Walt, initiated an inquiry. The committee's final report to Parliament in July 1978 found that there had been financial irregularities and that a more extensive inquiry should be established. Rhoodie was forced to resign, and Vorster dissolved the Department of Information, replacing it with the Bureau of National and International Communication. Van den Bergh also resigned and BOSS was restructured.

==== Reynders inquiry ====
Also in July 1978, Vorster appointed BOSS to conduct a special internal investigation into financial irregularities in the use of the secret accounts. The BOSS auditor was Loot Reynders. On 20 September, Vorster resigned as Prime Minister, citing ill health, and took up the State Presidency, a largely ceremonial position similar to that of Governor-General of South Africa. Botha, his Minister of Defence, became Prime Minister. In late September, the report of the Reynders inquiry was leaked in a nationalist newspaper in Mulder's constituency. The report was remarkably brief and found no irregularities, clearing Mulder and his department. The leak came only days before an internal National Party leadership election in which Mulder was slated to compete – he had previously held substantial political power as the Party's apparent "crown prince." However, despite Reynders's favourable report, Mulder lost the leadership election to Botha.

==== Mostert Commission ====
I have no pangs of conscience about the entire matter because everything I have done I did in the conviction that I was serving my country, South Africa, in the best way.

— Minister Connie Mulder, upon his resignation from Cabinet

Finance Minister Owen Horwood appointed Justice Anton Mostert to carry out an inquiry into foreign exchange control violations in particular. In his testimony, Luyt implicated Vorster, Mulder, and van den Bergh in the project. Despite efforts by Botha to block him, Mostert decided in the public interest to release some of his findings on 2 November 1978. He announced that the Department of Information had misappropriated at least $15 million in public funds, including to finance the Citizen. On 3 November, the Rand Daily Mail ran the story under a famous banner headline reading "It's all true." Three days later, Botha suspended the Mostert Commission. In the following weeks, Mulder resigned from the Cabinet and then from his chairmanship of the National Party's Transvaal branch.

==== Erasmus Commission ====
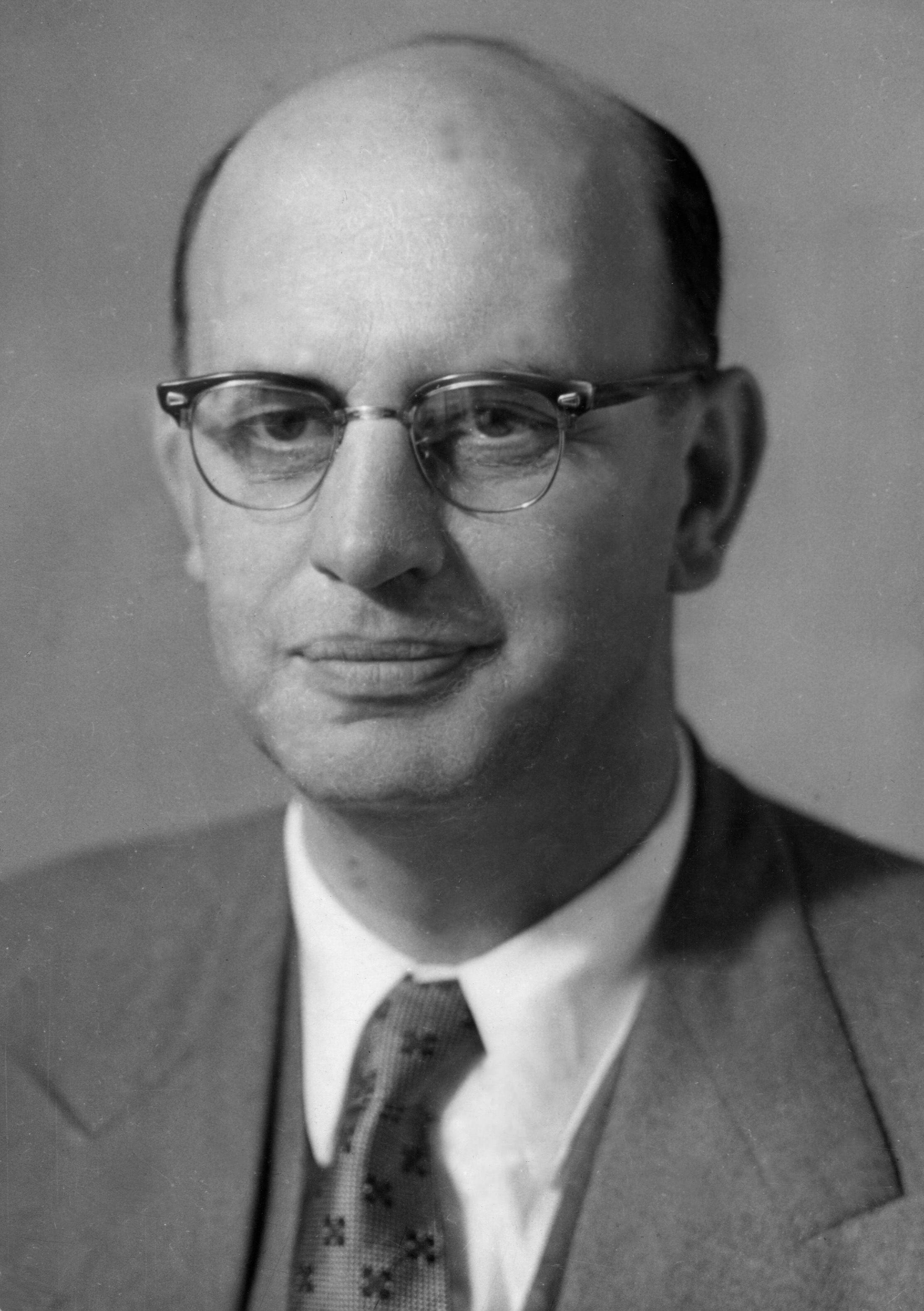
P. W. Botha, Vorster's successor, was cleared of any wrongdoing

The Commission of Inquiry into Alleged Irregularities in the Former Department of Information, better known as the Erasmus Commission, was appointed in November 1978 under Justice Rudolph Erasmus. It was the most extensive of the inquiries into the Information Scandal, though its proceedings were kept secret, ostensibly for national security reasons. It released its first report in an emergency session of Parliament in December 1978 and its second on 4 June 1979. Rhoodie, Mulder, and van den Bergh all claimed that Vorster had been closely involved in the Project. After the publication of the first report, which was sympathetic to Vorster, Mulder went to the press to double down on these allegations: he said that van den Bergh had informed Vorster of the proposal to launch the Citizen in December 1975, and that in December 1976 Vorster had been consulted on the details of the scheme. He also said that Vorster was one of three Cabinet members – the others being Defence Minister Botha and Finance Minister Horwood – who had attended meetings on Project Annemarie from 1974 onward. Vorster continued to maintain that he had first learnt of the Citizen project in August 1977, during the state audit, and that it had been discussed in his Cabinet only once, shortly before his resignation as Prime Minister. In April 1979, Mulder was expelled from the National Party for refusing to accept Erasmus's findings.

However, Erasmus ultimately came to accept Mulder's account of Vorster's involvement, concluding that Vorster had been fully informed ("knew everything") about, and had covered up, the department's involvement with the Citizen and other projects. While presenting the second Erasmus report to Parliament in June 1979, Botha announced that Vorster had resigned as State President in disgrace. Botha was absolved of any wrongdoing, on the basis that he had not known how the slush fund was used and so had not known about the irregularities. Mulder, Rhoodie and van den Bergh were held primarily responsible for the irregularities, with Erasmus also claiming that Rhoodie and van den Bergh had attempted to manipulate the September 1978 National Party election to have Mulder appointed Vorster's successor. Erasmus did not reveal what other Project Annemarie initiatives had been, and he recommended that dozens of them should continue to operate.

=== Criminal charges against Rhoodie ===
Rhoodie testified at the Erasmus Commission but fled the country immediately afterwards, spending time in Ecuador, the United Kingdom, the United States, and France. In an interview with the BBC, he told David Dimbleby that he was a scapegoat and that senior officials, including the Prime Minister, had authorised the projects. In July 1979, he was extradited from France to South Africa to face fraud and theft charges. He was found guilty on five counts and sentenced to six years' imprisonment, but the verdict was overturned on appeal in 1980. Rhoodie continued to maintain that he was innocent and had been the victim of a political "vendetta."

== See also ==
- Eschel Rhoodie
- Connie Mulder
- Bureau for State Security
