= Tammy Breedt =

South African politician (born 1986)

Tammy Breedt MP

Permanent Delegate to the National Council of Provinces from the Free State
- Incumbent
- Assumed office 15 June 2024

Member of the National Assembly of South Africa
- In office 22 May 2019 – 28 May 2024

Member of the Free State Provincial Legislature
- In office 7 December 2017 – 7 May 2019

Personal details
- Born: Tamarin Breedt; 29 March 1986 (age 40) Johannesburg, South Africa
- Party: Freedom Front Plus
- Occupation: Politician

Tamarin "Tammy" Breedt (born 29 March 1986) is a South African politician who is the national youth leader of the Freedom Front Plus (FF Plus) as well as a member of the National Council of Provinces. She was a Member of the Free State Provincial Legislature from December 2017 until May 2019 and a Member of the National Assembly of South Africa from May 2019 until May 2024. Breedt was married to fellow FF Plus MP Wouter Wessels.

== Early life ==
Breedt was born on 29 March 1986 in Johannesburg, South Africa. She studied at the University of the Free State where she was a member of the university's student council and the speaker of the Student Parliament.

== Career ==
Breedt was soon employed as the FF Plus' liaison at the Mangaung Metropolitan Municipality. She currently serves as the national youth leader of the FF Plus and is a member of the party's federal council, the federal committee and the Free State executive committee.

Following her husband's deployment to the National Assembly in December 2017, she filled his position in the Free State Provincial Legislature.

In May 2019, she was elected to the National Assembly. She took office on 22 May 2019. She and Heloïse Denner are the first women to represent the FF Plus in Parliament. She serves on the Portfolio Committee on Agriculture, Land Reform and Rural Development.

Following the 2024 general election, the FF Plus announced that Breedt would represent the party in the National Council of Provinces as a permanent delegate from the Free State. She was sworn in on 15 June 2024.

== Personal life ==
She married Wouter Wessels in 2015. In 2018, they were the victims of a home burglary.
