= Corné Mulder =

South African politician

Corné Mulder MP
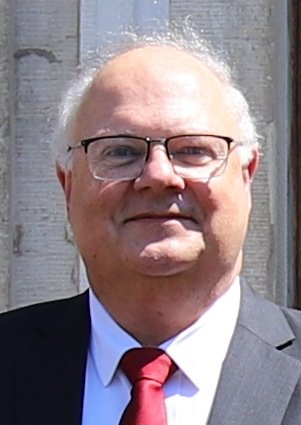
- Mulder in 2023

Leader of the Freedom Front Plus
- Incumbent
- Assumed office 22 February 2025
- Preceded by: Pieter Groenewald

Member of the National Assembly
- Incumbent
- Assumed office 9 May 1994

Member of the House of Assembly for Randfontein
- In office 29 March 1988 – 9 May 1994

Personal details
- Born: Cornelius Petrus Mulder; 28 September 1958 (age 68) Randfontein, Transvaal,^{[a]} South Africa
- Party: Freedom Front Plus (1994-); Conservative Party (pre-1994)
- Education: Potchefstroom University
- Occupation: Politician
- a. Now Gauteng

Cornelius Petrus Mulder (born 28 September 1958) is a South African politician who has been the leader of the Freedom Front Plus since February 2025. Mulder is South Africa's longest-serving Member of Parliament, having been elected to Parliament in 1988.

== Early life ==
Corné Mulder is the son of former National Party minister Connie Mulder who served under John Vorster. He is also the younger brother of former Freedom Front Plus leader Pieter Mulder. Corné Mulder graduated from Potchefstroom University, with a B.Juris degree, followed by an LL.B in 1982. He later completed doctoral research at the Institute for Advanced Legal Studies at the University of London and the Max-Planck-Institut für Ausländisches öffentliches Recht und Völkerrecht at Heidelberg, Germany.

== Career ==
First elected as an MP for the Conservative Party prior to South Africa's transition to full democracy, Mulder has continuously served as a member of the National Assembly of South Africa since 1994. He served as the chief parliamentary whip of the Freedom Front Plus as well as the party's Western Cape leader.

After the Freedom Front Plus joined the coalition government following the 2024 general election, Mulder was selected to succeed party leader Pieter Groenewald as parliamentary leader after the latter was appointed Minister of Correctional Services. Mulder would then go on to succeed Groenewald as party leader during the party's elective conference in February 2025.
