= Federal Alliance (South Africa) =

South African political party

Logo of the Federal Alliance

The Federal Alliance (Afrikaans: Federale Alliansie) was a small South African political party that contested the South African general election in 1999. The party was led by business magnate Louis Luyt, and founded in 1998. They later joined the Democratic Party and the New National Party to form the Democratic Alliance but eventually broke away. The party did not contest the general election in 2004, instead fielding two candidates to the Gauteng Provincial Legislature on the DA's electoral lists. The FA gained these two seats in 2005 when the MPLs defected during the floor crossing window. This soured its relationship with the DA and ended all co-operation between the two parties.

After contesting the 2006 municipal elections in Gauteng, failing to win any seats, the FA instead joined the Freedom Front Plus in 2007, with leader Pieter Mulder and Luyt announcing the merger.

== Election results ==
=== National elections ===
Election	Votes	%	Seats
1999	86,704	0.54	2

=== Municipal elections ===
Election	Votes	%
2006	2,792	0.01%
