= Bureau of State Security =

South African intelligence agency

Bureau for State Security
- Buro vir Staatsveiligheid
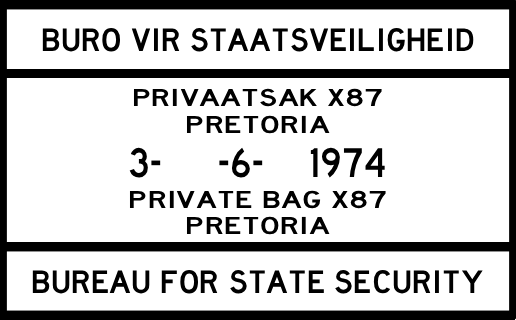
- One of the seals used by the Bureau for State Security, here dated the 3rd of June, 1974

Agency overview
- Formed: 1968 (originally); 1 May 1969 (legally constituted)
- Preceding agency: Republican Intelligence
- Dissolved: 6 February 1980
- Superseding agency: National Intelligence Service
- Type: Intelligence agency and secret police
- Jurisdiction: South Africa
- Status: Defunct
- Agency executives: Hendrik van den Bergh, Director-General (1969–1978); Alec van Wyk, Director-General (1978–1980; acting)

The Bureau for State Security (Afrikaans: Buro vir Staatsveiligheid; BSV), also known as the Bureau of State Security (BOSS), was the main South African state intelligence agency from 1969 to 1980. A high-budget and secretive institution, it reported directly to the prime minister on its broad national security mandate. Under this mandate, it was at the centre of the Apartheid state's domestic intelligence and foreign intelligence activities, including counterinsurgency efforts both inside South Africa and in neighbouring countries. Like other appendages of the apartheid-era security forces, it has been implicated in human rights violations, political repression, and extrajudicial killings.

For most of its existence, BOSS was headed by General Hendrik van den Bergh, who, while special Security Adviser to Prime Minister John Vorster, was instrumental in its establishment. The Truth and Reconciliation Commission saw the creation of BOSS as an example of the growing National Party politicisation of South African law enforcement, intelligence and security services, which over time was able to dominate both the South African Government and culture, while in turn being dominated by Prime Minister Vorster's office. Even as BOSS cooperated closely with other parts of the intelligence and security services – especially the South African Defence Force, the Department of Foreign Affairs, and the Security Branch of the South African Police – they were frequently locked in an extremely hostile competition over funding, power, and resources.

General van den Bergh resigned as director-general in 1978 in the wake of the Muldergate scandal, and the cabinet portfolio was renamed to National Security (Afrikaans: Nasionale Veiligheid). In the same year, Vorster was replaced as prime minister by defence minister, P. W. Botha, whose government pursued a protracted restructuring of the intelligence services, culminating in the replacement of the department with the National Intelligence Service in 1980.

== Background ==
Though BOSS was not formally established and legislated until May 1969, it is generally understood to have been operating from late 1968. It replaced the Republican Intelligence unit of the Security Branch of the South African Police. Under Minister of Justice John Vorster, Republican Intelligence and the police generally had benefitted from an expansion of their powers, through legislation such as the Sabotage Act of 1962 and the General Law Amendment Act of 1963, which allowed arbitrary arrest and detention. However, in the middle of 1968, the Cabinet approved the creation of a centralised security service. On 28 August 1968, Hendrik van den Bergh, the head of the Security Branch and Deputy Police Commissioner, was instructed to start planning the new organisation. On the 1 October, he was promoted to the rank of General and appointed special Security Adviser to Vorster, who had become prime minister after the assassination of Hendrik Verwoerd. Vorster and van der Bergh were close allies – they were both former members of the pro-Nazi Ossewabrandwag during World War II, and had been imprisoned for sabotage together. Because of this close association, and the extensive powers he had under his advisory role, van der Bergh was seen as "untouchable," which led to tensions within the state that were only exacerbated by the establishment of "super-security" structure BOSS.

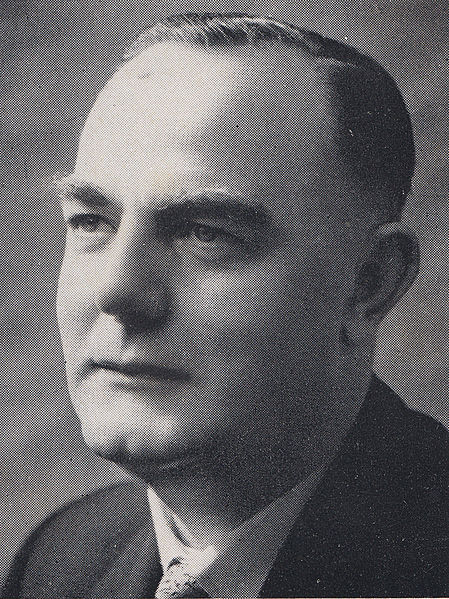
John Vorster, the Prime Minister who established and oversaw BOSS

By March 1969, the skeleton of a new security service began to emerge in the projected expenditures for the 1969–70 financial year. R5.32 million was allocated to the secret services, a 189 percent increase over the previous year, with R4.06 million allocated to the Prime Minister's office for a new security section under van den Bergh. Minister of the Interior S.L. Muller described the proposed agency as a coordinating body which would be staffed by experienced security and intelligence personnel from other departments. The budget of the military intelligence division was concurrently reduced from R830 000 in the previous year to R39 000, which initiated a continuous struggle for power between military intelligence and BOSS which lasted throughout the 1970s.

=== Formal establishment ===
On 16 May 1969, Government Notice No. 808 formally established the Bureau for State Security, with retrospective effect from 1 May, as a department of state under the Prime Minister. Van den Bergh was appointed at its head. According to the notice, BOSS's functions were:

1. to investigate all matters affecting the security of the State, to correlate and evaluate the information collected, and, where necessary, to inform and advise the Government, interested Government departments, and other bodies in regard thereto; and
2. to perform such other functions and responsibilities as may be determined from time to time.

In the same period, a series of related legislation was introduced in Parliament: the Public Service Amendment Bill on 13 May; the Security Services Special Account Bill on 19 May; and the General Law Amendment Bill on 4 June. All three bills were passed that winter. The Public Service Amendment Act of 1969 outlined BOSS's structure – significantly, BOSS was established under the direct and exclusive control of the Prime Minister, in contrast to other public bodies, which were partly overseen by the Public Service Commission. The Security Services Special Account Act of 1969 established a "Special Account" on BOSS's books, which could be expended on confidential items at the Minister's approval and which, unlike other state-funded funded accounts, would not be subject to the annual audit. Finally, and most controversially, the General Law Amendment Act of 1969 included a provision which authorised the Prime Minister, his nominee, or any Cabinet Minister to veto the provision of any evidence or documents to any court or statutory body, provided the evidence or documents were "prejudicial to the interests of the State or public security." The Act also made it an offence to disclose any "security matter," including any matter relating to BOSS or any person's relationship to BOSS. These amendments were met with alarm among liberal and anti-Apartheid civil society groups, with opposition politician Alex Hepple likening BOSS to the Gestapo.

=== Potgieter Commission ===
On 5 September 1969, Vorster formed a commission led by Justice H.J. Potgieter to establish the guidelines and mission for intelligence gathering by BOSS and military intelligence. The commission to Inquire into Certain Intelligence Aspects of State Security, known better as the Potgieter Commission, investigated clashes between the two organisations over who had primary responsibility for intelligence gathering in South Africa. As van den Bergh was a close ally of Vorster, military intelligence saw it as a foregone conclusion that BOSS would achieve favour. The report of the commission, released on 2 February 1972, led to the enactment on 24 May of the Security Intelligence and State Security Council Act of 1972. The Act formalised the functions and the brief of BOSS, and also established the State Security Council, which replaced the Cabinet State Security Committee and became the government's national policy centre for national security. The council was supposed to coordinate information gathered by BOSS and other entities, thus ensuring that none could attempt to dominate the others politically, but this system ultimately failed to reduce the rivalry among different security and intelligence agencies.

== Organisational structure ==
BOSS reportedly comprised the following departments:

- Subversion
- Counter-Espionage
- Political and Economic Espionage
- Military Intelligence
- Administration
- National Evaluation, Research and Special Studies

As a department of state, it was headed by a Director-General, who for most of its existence was van den Bergh.

== Activities ==
Other intelligence divisions, including military intelligence and the Security Branch, were required to submit intelligence to BOSS. By the late 1970s, it was thought to employ more than 1 000 agents, many of whom worked undercover.

=== Internal surveillance ===
BOSS was involved in gathering and assessing intelligence about anti-Apartheid and liberation movements, including identifying targets for raids, both in South Africa and in neighbouring countries. For example, Charles Sebe, before he became security chief in the Ciskei homeland, was a BOSS agent in King William's Town, where BOSS was investigating local chapters of the Black Consciousness Movement. In late 1979 and early 1980, the British Observer published allegations – substantiated by documents leaked by a former BOSS agent – that BOSS, then known as the Department of National Security, had been intercepting the mail and private telephone calls of prominent politicians and civil society leaders, including Alan Paton, André Brink, and Helen Suzman.

=== Propaganda ===
As was revealed in the Information Scandal of 1978, BOSS acted as banker for the Department of Information in respect of a secret slush fund channelled from the Department of Defence and used to fund a series of propaganda projects, including the establishment of the Citizen, a pro-government newspaper. Some of BOSS's own budget was occasionally used for the same purpose. It is unclear exactly what role BOSS played in the propaganda campaign at the heart of the scandal, but the Department of Information relied on BOSS intelligence. Van den Bergh was certainly closely involved in the planning and implementation of the campaign, and other BOSS officials may also have been.

=== Z-Squad and alleged extra-judicial killings ===
At the Erasmus Commission of inquiry following the Muldergate scandal, van den Bergh hinted that murder was within the scope of BOSS's duties: "I have enough men to commit murder if I tell them to kill. I don't care who the prey is. These are the type of men I have." Former BOSS agents later claimed that BOSS was involved in extrajudicial killings through a covert operational unit formed in the early 1970s and known as the "Z-Squad." Others confirmed that the Z-Squad existed but denied that it was involved in political killings. The Z-Squad was linked to the 1977 assassination of NP politician Robert Smit and his wife; the 1978 assassination of Rick Turner; and the February 1974 cross-border assassinations by letter bombs of anti-Apartheid activists John Dube ('Boy Mvemve') of Umkhonto weSizwe and Onkgopotse Tiro of SASO. It has also been alleged that the Z-Squad specialised in interrogating South Africans who had been captured fighting for nationalist movements in Rhodesia and Mozambique, some of whom were killed after interrogation. The Truth and Reconciliation Commission (TRC) concluded in its final report that BOSS was "possibly" involved in extrajudicial killings, and probably responsible for the murders of Dube and Tiro.

=== Operations in southern African countries ===
The TRC heard evidence that BOSS and the South African Defence Force (SADF) jointly led Operation Plathond, under which Zambians were trained for destabilisation operations against the pro-ANC Kaunda government. The TRC was not able to corroborate the claims and details of the Operation remain opaque. However, close links among BOSS and other intelligence services – especially PIDE of colonial Mozambique and the Rhodesian Central Intelligence Organisation and security police – are well-documented and dated back at least to 1969. The agencies coordinated their counterinsurgency efforts in southern Africa and discussed cooperating on covert operations against Kaunda's government; and BOSS channelled "material support" directly from the South African government to intelligence services in Angola and Mozambique. BOSS may also have had a relationship with the American Central Intelligence Agency (CIA) – van den Bergh received CIA training before BOSS was established.

== Demise ==
In the wake of the Information Scandal, which implicated both BOSS and Vorster, van den Bergh resigned in June 1978 and was replaced by Alec van Wyk as acting Director-General. On 1 September 1978, BOSS was renamed the Department of National Security (DONS).

On 20 September, Vorster resigned and was replaced by his Defence Minister, P.W. Botha. Botha's ascension increased the influence of SADF and especially of military intelligence. According to the TRC, the dominance of BOSS and the Security Branch had already began to wane in the late 1970s, amid what was later described as "years of illegality, financial abuse and political meddling" at BOSS/DONS. Botha brought BOSS under tighter executive control. He also appointed Kobie Coetsee, Deputy Defence and Intelligence Minister, to lead a commission of inquiry into intelligence gathering in South Africa and in particular into the question of who would be the lead agency. At the same time, the Erasmus Commission was investigating the Information Scandal. Believing that the outcome of neither inquiry would be to the advantage of BOSS/DONS, officials began to shred any documentation that could be used against them.

In November 1979, Botha appointed Niel Barnard to BOSS/DONS, with a view to having Barnard lead its transformation. Barnard was promoted to Director-General in February 1980, and, at the same time, Botha announced that BOSS/DONS would become the National Intelligence Service. In this new iteration, BOSS/DONS was restructured to focus on research and analysis, with its covert operational functions transferred to the Security Branch.
