= Hendrik van den Bergh (police official) =

South African police officer (1914–1997)

Hendrik Johan van den Bergh SSA
- Born: 27 November 1914; Vredefort, Orange Free State, Union of South Africa
- Died: 16 August 1997 (aged 82); Bronkhorstspruit, Pretoria, South Africa
- Other name: "Tall Hendrik" (Afrikaans: Lang Hendrik)
- Known for: Founding of Bureau of State Security (B.O.S.S.)
- Police career
- Country: South African Police
- Allegiance: South Africa
- Department: South African Bureau of State Security
- Branch: Intelligence
- Service years: c. 1945 – 1980
- Rank: General/Director-General

General Hendrik Johan van den Bergh, SSA (27 November 1914 – 16 August 1997) was a South African police official most famous for founding the Bureau of State Security (B.O.S.S.), an intelligence agency created on 16 May 1969 to coordinate military and domestic intelligence for the government as well as to suppress political dissidents. He was known as "Tall Hendrik" (Afrikaans: Lang Hendrik) on account of his height (6 feet 5 inches (196 cm)).

== Biography ==
Born in Vredefort, Orange Free State into an Afrikaner farming family, van den Bergh was a lifelong Afrikaner nationalist. He was opposed to South African intervention in World War II, and, with future Prime Minister John Vorster, joined the Ossewabrandwag ("Oxwagon Sentinel"), a paramilitary organisation modelled on the Nazi SA which engaged in acts of sabotage against the South African government to undermine the war effort. Both men were detained by the government under wartime emergency laws for their activities.

After the war, van den Bergh rose rapidly through the police ranks. In 1963, he founded South Africa's first intelligence agency, the precursor to B.O.S.S. He and Vorster (later justice minister under Prime Minister H.F. Verwoerd) used new security legislation to crush growing resistance against apartheid.

Although van den Bergh denied B.O.S.S.' use of hit squads against its enemies, he is nevertheless remembered for sanctioning the use of torture, assassinations, and other tactics against the government's enemies, and he once told a government commission, "I have enough men to commit murder if I tell them to kill. I don't care who the prey is. These are the type of men I have."

In the mid-1970s, the burgeoning Angolan Civil War between the pro-Soviet MPLA and the anti-communist UNITA factions, drew the attention of the South African government, which feared growing Soviet infiltration in the region. The government was divided on how best to counter the Soviet involvement, with Defence Minister P.W. Botha and Chief of the Army Magnus Malan advocating an all-out invasion, and Prime Minister Vorster (who had succeeded the assassinated Verwoerd in 1966) and van den Bergh favouring only a limited, covert operation. In the end, the latter option was chosen, and the South African intervention did not succeed, when South African forces, in sight of the Angolan capital, were repulsed by a fresh influx of Cuban troops. The United States, which had covertly backed the operation, was forced to withdraw its support when Congress vetoed the Ford administration's request for funding for UNITA; as a result, South Africa was forced to withdraw.

B.O.S.S. became increasingly powerful as the 1970s progressed, much to the dismay of Botha; by some accounts, the organisation now wielded more influence than the Ministries of Defence and Foreign Affairs.

Nevertheless, B.O.S.S., and by extension van den Bergh himself, met its downfall just a few years later. In 1979, Vorster, who had become state president in 1978, resigned amidst the Muldergate scandal, in which government funds were used to buy a pro-government English newspaper, The Citizen. B.O.S.S. was found to have been deeply involved in the scandal, as well. The following year, Botha, who had succeeded Vorster as prime minister, called for van den Bergh's resignation, and in 1980, B.O.S.S. was replaced by a new agency, the National Intelligence Service, and van den Bergh was replaced by Dr. Niël Barnard.

In the aftermath of the scandal, van den Bergh retired and faded from public view to take up chicken farming. Reportedly, he was working on his memoirs in the 1980s, but abandoned the project under pressure from the government. He also resigned as a member of the Afrikaner Broederbond.

Van den Bergh died at Bronkhorstspruit, Pretoria, aged 82, in 1997. He was married twice.

== See also ==
- South African Bureau of State Security
- Muldergate Scandal
