= John P. McGoff =

American publisher

- Born: 1925
- Died: January 21, 1998 (aged 72–73); Charlevoix, Michigan, U.S.
- Education: Michigan State University
- Occupation: Newspaper publisher
- Spouse: Margaret Ewert
- Children: Susan, Thomas, David, Steven, Andrew
- Parent(s): Sara Robinson, Peter McGoff

John P. McGoff (1925 – January 21, 1998) was an American conservative newspaper publisher. He was the founder of the Panax Corporation and Global Communications, and the owner of "over seventy newspapers across the United States." His ties to the apartheid-era South African government drew attention from the Securities and Exchange Commission and the Michigan State University community, but his 1986 charges were dropped due to a five-year statute of limitation. He filed for bankruptcy upon his retirement.

== Early life ==
John P. McGoff was born in 1925. He spent his early years with his family, including six siblings, in Pittsburgh, Pennsylvania, where his father was a steel worker. During World War II, he served in the United States Army both in Italy and Africa. He graduated from Michigan State University in 1950.

== Career ==
McGoff began his career in media by working for MSU's radio station, WKAR-FM. He established his own FM radio station in East Lansing, Michigan, in 1958. It began broadcasting in 1959 as WSWM. Sold in 1971, to Robert Liggett of Liggett Communications, that station is today WFMK. He then acquired FM stations in Detroit, Flint and other cities and operated an FM network. He subsequently founded the Panax Corporation and Global Communications, and became the owner of "over seventy newspapers across the United States." His newspapers took a decidedly conservative stance, promoting free enterprise. McGoff attempted to purchase The Washington Star in 1974 but his bid failed, as did his 1977 bid for the Oakland Tribune.

McGoff was described as "a major apologist for the white supremacist government in South Africa" by the Detroit Free Press in 1975. He served as a founding member of the board of The Citizen, a South African newspaper founded in 1975. In 1983, McGoff was accused by the Securities and Exchange Commission of purchasing The Sacramento Union for $6 million and acquiring a $1.3 million in the United Press International Television News via a "$11.3 million no-interest loan from South Africa." His $500,000 donation to MSU for the dedication of a theatre in honor of his wife was returned after members of the MSU community objected to his ties to the apartheid regime the following year. In November 1986, he was charged on suspicion of being an "unregistered foreign agent for South Africa since 1974." By December 1986, the charges were dropped by Federal District Judge Charles Robert Richey due to a "five-year time limit" as McGoff had cut his ties with the South African government in 1979.

McGoff "filed for personal bankruptcy" in 1995 after the buyer of one of his newspapers, The Macomb Daily, failed to pay him and left him with a 40 million dollar debt.

== Personal life, death and legacy ==
McGoff married Margaret Ewert and they had five children. They resided in Williamston, Michigan, and they retired in Charlevoix, Michigan. McGoff was a fundraiser for the Republican Party, and a "close friend" of President Gerald Ford.

McGoff sought the State Republican Party nomination for a seat on the Michigan State University Board of Trustees in 1963 but did not make it. However, he later was appointed by Republican Governor George W. Romney to the Board of Control of Northern Michigan University, located in Marquette, Michigan where he owned The Mining Journal.

McGoff died of cancer on January 21, 1998, in Charlevoix, at age 73. He is the namesake of the McGoff Performing Arts Center at Williamston High School.
