= Louis Luyt =

South African businessman and politician

President of the South African Rugby Union

Personal details
- Born: 18 June 1932 Britstown, Karoo, Western Cape
- Died: 1 February 2013 (aged 80) Durban, KwaZulu-Natal

Louis Luyt (18 June 1932 – 1 February 2013) was a South African business tycoon and politician, and one-time rugby administrator.

Having been a rugby player as a young man, Luyt went on to become a businessman. He founded Triomf Fertiliser and Luyt Breweries, and took control of Ellis Park stadium in Johannesburg. Distrusted by the Afrikaner elite, Luyt achieved financial success without being a member of the secretive Broederbond.

== The Citizen ==
In 1976, during the apartheid era, Luyt founded a new English language newspaper, The Citizen. It was later revealed that the money to establish and finance the newspaper had come from a secret slush fund of the Department of Information, and ultimately from the Department of Defense.

== Rugby administrator ==
He was president of the South African Rugby Union when the Springboks, the national team, won the Rugby World Cup in 1995 at their first attempt after returning to international competition after more than a decade of isolation. At the official dinner for the Springboks and the New Zealand All Blacks, following the former's narrow victory over the latter in the final, in a speech described by the New Zealand media as "boorish", he declared that if they had played, South Africa would have won the previous two Rugby World Cups including the 1987 tournament won by the All Blacks. In response, the All Blacks walked out of the dinner. During that same dinner, he also caused controversy by publicly thanking referee Derek Bevan for his refereeing during the semi-final between France and South Africa; Bevan had denied France a last-minute try, despite it "look[ing] like [Frenchman Abdelatif Benazzi] had grounded the ball over the tryline on the slow motion action replay" (there was at the time no television match official). Had the try been allowed, France would have taken the lead. Luyt invited Bevan onto stage to accept an expensive gold watch, leading to a mass walkout, with Bevan himself leaving the room.

In 1998 allegations of lingering racism in rugby led to him being required to appear before a presidential commission of inquiry but Luyt refused to appear and forced President Mandela into court. The High Court found for Luyt, but on appeal the Constitutional Court found against him and for the President.

== Politician ==
In 1998, Luyt resigned as rugby union president after being accused of racism and financial mismanagement, and he later formed a political party. He was a member of Parliament as leader of the Federal Alliance from 1999. In 2000 the Federal Alliance merged with the Democratic Party and the New National Party to form the Democratic Alliance before in 2007 Luyt finally led his party to join with the Freedom Front Plus and retired from active politics.
