= Freedom Front Plus =

Political party in South Africa

Freedom Front Plus Vryheidsfront Plus
- Abbreviation: VF Plus
- Leader: Corné Mulder
- Chairperson: Wouter Wessels
- National Spokesperson: Wouter Wessels
- Chief whip: Heloïse Denner
- Founder: Constand Viljoen
- Founded: 1 March 1994; 32 years ago
- Registered: 4 March 1994
- Split from: Afrikaner Volksfront
- Headquarters: Charles de Gaulle Crescent, Centurion, Gauteng
- Youth wing: Vryheidsfront Plus-Jeug
- Membership (2008): 25–30,000
- Ideology: Anti-communism; Afrikaner nationalism; Conservatism; Federalism
- Political position: Centre-right (self-described); Right-wing
- National affiliation: Since 2023: Multi-Party Charter (MPC); 2003–2006: KP–AEB–FA
- International affiliation: UNPO
- Provincial Affiliation: CapeXit Election Accord
- Colours: Orange Green
- Slogan: Slaan Terug (Fight Back)
- National Assembly: 6 / 400
- National Council of Provinces: 2 / 90
- Provincial Legislatures: 9 / 487
- City of Tshwane: 17 / 214
- Cape Town City Council: 4 / 231

Website
- www.vfplus.org.za

The Freedom Front Plus (FF Plus or FF+; Afrikaans: Vryheidsfront Plus, VF Plus) is a right-wing political party in South Africa that was formed (as the Freedom Front) in 1994. It is led by Corné Mulder. Since 2024, it is a part of the current South African government of national unity together with the African National Congress (ANC), the Democratic Alliance and other parties.

== History ==
=== Origins as the Freedom Front (1994–2003) ===
The Freedom Front was founded on 1 March 1994 by members of the Afrikaner community under Constand Viljoen, after he had left the Afrikaner Volksfront amidst disagreements. Seeking to achieve his goals through electoral means, Viljoen registered the Freedom Front with the Independent Electoral Commission (IEC) on 4 March 1994 to take part in the April 1994 general elections (This date has also been given as 7 March). On 12 March 1994 Viljoen handed in a list of candidates for the FF to the IEC, confirming that his party would take part in the elections.

In the election, under the leadership of Viljoen, the Freedom Front received 2.2% of the national vote (with 424,555 votes cast), earning nine seats in the National Assembly, and 3.3% (with 639,643 votes cast) of the combined vote to the nine provincial legislatures. This suggested that many Afrikaners had split their vote. The party performed the best in the rural areas of the former Transvaal and Orange Free State, and was noted by the new deputy president Thabo Mbeki as representing possibly as much as half the Afrikaner voting population in these areas, with the strongest support among farmers and the working class.

Freedom Front support gradually eroded in the coming years, as the party was strung along in ultimately fruitless negotiations with the African National Congress (ANC) to create a Volkstaat making the party lose its importance. It would also receive increased competition from new parties such as the Afrikaner Eenheidsbeweging. In the 1999 election their support dropped to 0.8% (127,217 votes cast) with three seats in the National Assembly and between 1 and 2% in its stronghold provinces. This represented a respectable portion of the Afrikaner vote, but nowhere near earlier levels. The party's support remained relatively stable in all national elections held during the next twenty years.

In 2001, Viljoen retired and Pieter Mulder was elected as leader.

=== Formation of the FF+ and early years (2003–2016) ===
Freedom Front logo between 1994 and 2003

In 2003, shortly before the 2004 general election, the Conservative Party, the Afrikaner Eenheidsbeweging and the Freedom Front decided to contest the election as a single entity under the name Freedom Front Plus (FF Plus or FF+), led by Mulder. Later, the Federal Alliance also joined the VF+/FF+.

Under Mulder's leadership the party's support remained relatively stable.

In the 2004 general election, support for the Freedom Front Plus rose slightly to 0.89% (139,465 votes cast). The party won one seat in most of the provincial legislatures, and four seats in the National Assembly.

In the 2006 municipal elections, the FF Plus received 1% of the popular vote (252,253 votes cast).

In the 2009 general election, the party received 0.83% (146,796 votes cast) and retained its four seats in the National Assembly but lost its seats in the provincial legislatures of North West, Mpumalanga and Northern Cape. After the elections, the FF Plus's leader Pieter Mulder was appointed as Deputy Minister of Agriculture, Forestry and Fisheries by the new President Jacob Zuma.

In the 2014 general election, the FF Plus increased its vote slightly to 0.9%. It retained its 4 MPs, and also regained a seat in the North West.

Along with other parties, the FF Plus entered into coalition with the Democratic Alliance (DA) after the 2016 municipal elections to govern Johannesburg, Tshwane and several other municipalities.

=== Groenewald leadership and resurgence (2016–2025) ===
In 2016, Pieter Groenewald took over leadership of the FF Plus. He oversaw a pivot of the party away from being an exclusive abode for Afrikaners to that of one for all minorities, with a special focus on Afrikaans-speaking minorities. This was highlighted when the FF Plus and the Bruin Bemagtiging Beweging (Brown Movement) – an interest group focused on Coloureds led by Peter Marais, the former premier of the Western Cape – formed an official alliance. This ultimately led to Marais being elected as the party's candidate for premier of the Western Cape for the 2019 elections.

==== 2019 national and provincial elections ====
FF Plus voter support increased substantially in the 2019 general election, with the party growing its vote total by 250,000, to 2.38% of the national vote, earning ten seats in the National Assembly. This was more than the nine seats that the old Freedom Front had received in 1994. Additionally, it gained eight seats in the provincial legislatures, for a total of eleven. In the 2014 general election, the FF Plus won seats in three provincial legislatures, in 2019, it won seats in eight out of the nine provincial legislatures. Its new supporters were largely Afrikaners and Coloured voters from the Western Cape who had previously supported the DA.

Following the 2019 general election, the FF Plus won three wards from the Democratic Alliance (DA) in municipal by-elections in the North West Province and continued to show growth in various other municipal by-elections in Gauteng, Limpopo and Mpumalanga.

==== 2021 municipal elections and aftermath ====
In the run up to the 2021 local government elections, the FF Plus adopted Cape Independence as an official party position. They and CapeXit had a joint election campaign in the Western Cape to highlight the party's stance on Cape Independence. Over 60% of the FF Plus's ward councillors standing in the Western Cape were Coloureds, with Lennit Max being the party's candidate for mayor of Cape Town. The party claims that their candidates are selected purely on merit in contrast to the DA.

The FF Plus continued their gains in the Western Cape as a result, being in the kingmaker position in over 6 districts. In 2022, FF Plus member Manicks Mpunwana became a city councilor in Bela-Bela, becoming the first black South African to serve as a councilor from the FF Plus.

==== 2024 election and Government of National Unity ====
In the 2024 general election, the FF Plus gave up many of the gains it had previously made against the DA, winning only six seats in Parliament (National Assembly) with 1.36% of the vote. In June 2024, Freedom Front Plus agreed to join the ANC-led government of national unity (GNU) also known as the Third Cabinet of Cyril Ramaphosa. The leader of the FF Plus, Pieter Groenewald, became Minister of Correctional Services in the new Cabinet. Following Groenewald's appointment, leadership changes occurred in the party's parliamentary caucus which saw Corné Mulder succeed Groenewald as parliamentary leader and Wouter Wessels succeed Mulder as chief whip.

On 22 February 2025, Mulder was elected unopposed to succeed Groenewald as party leader after the latter chose not to seek re-election. However, Groenewald remained in his ministerial position.

The party also enjoys consistent landslide victories in the Afrikaner enclave Orania. (Note: 2004 84.95%, 2009 86.73%, 2014 76.89%, 2019 79.40%, 2024 65.62%)

=== Corné Mulder (2025–present) ===
Member of Parliament Dr. Corné Mulder was elected uncontested as Leader at the party’s elective conference in Pretoria on 22 February 2025.

On 25 March 2026 Dr. Mulder announced the merger of the Referendum Party into the FF Plus.

== Policies and ideology ==
FF Plus is a right-wing, conservative political party with its beliefs and ideals largely centered around Afrikaner interests' and Afrikaner nationalism with an orientation around Christian values. With its origins in Afrikaner Volksfront (Afrikaner People's Front) and the Conservative Party, FF Plus's position has shifted to being more moderate and populist since its beginning, particularly under the leadership of Pieter Groenewald, who has campaigned to alleviate issues within both Afrikaner and Coloured communities, particularly within the Cape provinces (Northern Cape, Western Cape, Eastern Cape).

Within the South African political landscape, the FF Plus is considered further to the right than many other parties, however holds significant vote share with the Democratic Alliance (DA), many voters of which moved toward the FF Plus at the 2019 election. Both parties' voters also hold some crossover on policy matters, such as abolishing affirmative action and replacing it with "merit-based appointments", opposing the proposed expropriation without compensation land reform movement, and support for federalism.

The party supports greater self-determination for Afrikaner and Coloured Afrikaans-speaking communities throughout South Africa, and has adopted Cape independence as an official party position. In this regard, the party has put forward legislation in the Western Cape Provincial Parliament (known as the Western Cape People's Bill) calling for a recognition of Western Cape self-determination.

=== Foreign policy ===
The FF Plus supports the strengthening of relations with countries that "promote self-determination within their own borders", as well as countries with whom South Africa has strong existing trade ties. The party has called on South Africa to criticize the Russian invasion of Ukraine and condemn Russia's actions. During the Gaza war, the party expressed support for Israel.

== Leaders ==
=== Party leader ===
| No. | Leader (birth–death) | Portrait | From | Took office | Left office | Duration of tenure |
|---|---|---|---|---|---|---|
| 1 | Constand Viljoen (1933–2020) | | National list | 1 March 1994 | 26 June 2001 | 7 years and 118 days |
| 2 | Pieter Mulder (b. 1951) | | National list | 26 June 2001 | 12 November 2016 | 15 years and 140 days |
| 3 | Pieter Groenewald (b. 1955) | | National list | 12 November 2016 | 22 February 2025 | 8 years and 102 days |
| 4 | Corné Mulder (b. 1958) | | Western Cape list | 22 February 2025 | Incumbent | 1 year and 267 days |

== Election results ==
Results of the 2019 South African general election by voting district. Those which the FF Plus won are in orange

These tables show the electoral performance for the FF Plus since the advent of democracy in 1994:

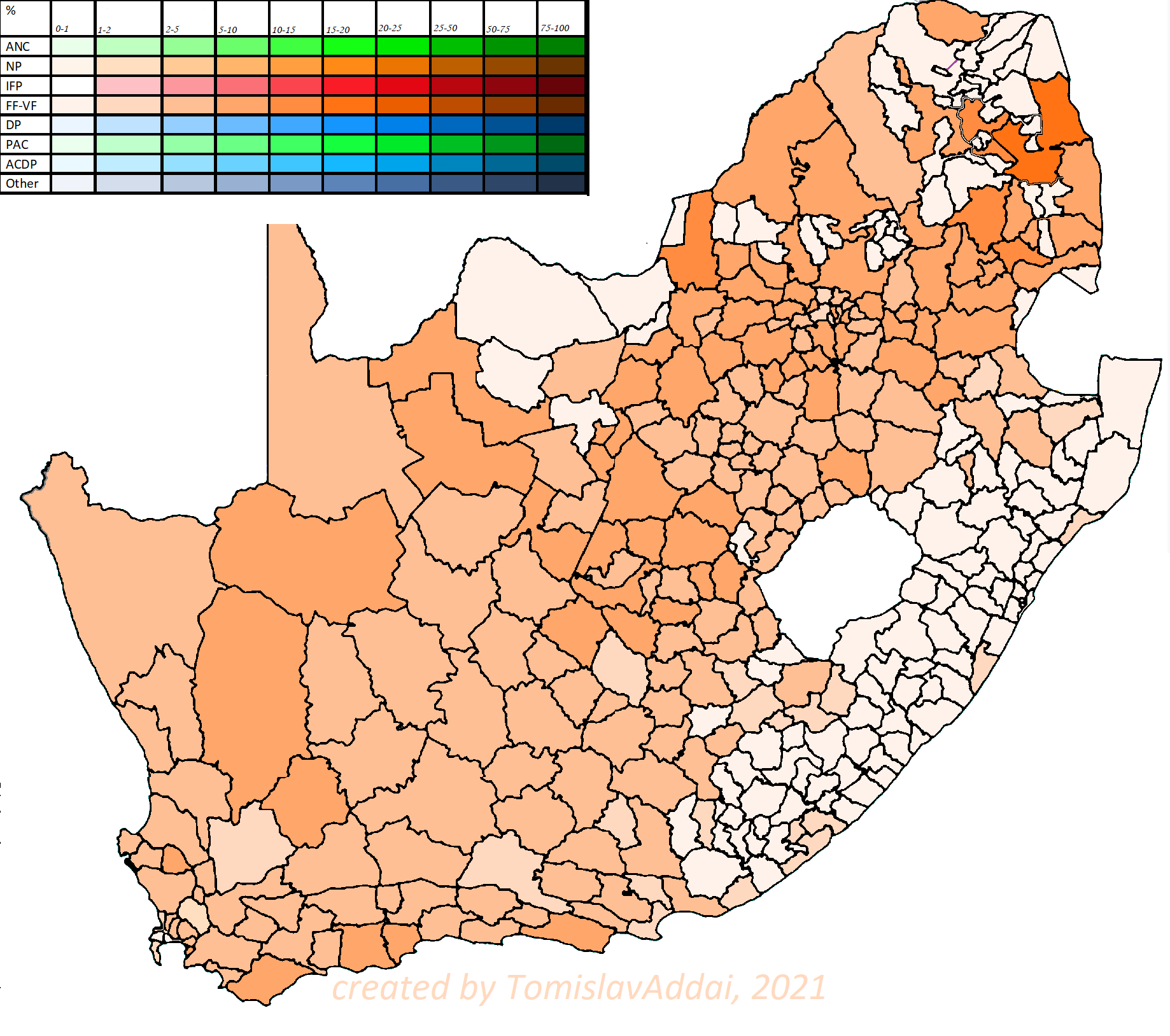
Results for the Freedom Front in the 1994 Election

=== National Assembly elections ===
| Election | Total votes | Share of vote | Seats | ± | Government |
|---|---|---|---|---|---|
| 1994 | 424,555 | 2.17% | 9 / 400 | – | in opposition largest opposition party (1994–1996) |
| 1999 | 127,217 | 0.80% | 3 / 400 | ▼6 | in opposition |
| 2004 | 139,465 | 0.89% | 4 / 400 | ▲1 | in opposition |
| 2009 | 146,796 | 0.83% | 4 / 400 | ±0 | in opposition delivered one deputy minister |
| 2014 | 165,715 | 0.90% | 4 / 400 | ±0 | in opposition |
| 2019 | 414,864 | 2.38% | 10 / 400 | ▲6 | in opposition |
| 2024 | 218,850 | 1.36% (Note: From 2024, seats in the National Assembly are determined by a combination of the national ballot, and the nine regional ballots. Only the national ballot figures are shown here.) | 6 / 400 | ▼4 | ANC–DA–IFP–PA–GOOD–PAC–VF+–UDM–RISE-ALJ coalition government |

=== Provincial elections ===
| Election | Eastern Cape | | Free State | | Gauteng | | Kwazulu-Natal | | Limpopo | | Mpumalanga | | North-West | | Northern Cape | | Western Cape | |
| Election | % | Seats | % | Seats | % | Seats | % | Seats | % | Seats | % | Seats | % | Seats | % | Seats | % | Seats |
|---|---|---|---|---|---|---|---|---|---|---|---|---|---|---|---|---|---|---|
| 1994 | 0.8% | 0/56 | 6.0% | 2/30 | 6.2% | 5/86 | 0.5% | 0/81 | 2.2% | 1/40 | 5.7% | 2/30 | 4.6% | 1/30 | 6.0% | 2/30 | 2.1% | 1/42 |
| 1999 | 0.3% | 0/63 | 2.1% | 1/30 | 1.3% | 1/73 | 0.2% | 0/80 | 0.7% | 0/49 | 1.7% | 1/30 | 1.4% | 1/33 | 1.7% | 1/30 | 0.4% | 0/42 |
| 2004 | 0.3% | 0/63 | 2.5% | 1/30 | 1.3% | 1/73 | 0.3% | 0/80 | 0.6% | 0/49 | 1.2% | 1/30 | 1.3% | 1/33 | 1.6% | 1/30 | 0.6% | 0/42 |
| 2009 | 0.2% | 0/63 | 2.0% | 1/30 | 1.6% | 1/73 | 0.8% | 0/80 | 0.6% | 0/49 | 0.9% | 0/30 | 1.8% | 0/33 | 1.2% | 0/30 | 0.4% | 0/42 |
| 2014 | 0.3% | 0/63 | 2.1% | 1/30 | 1.2% | 1/73 | 0.2% | 0/80 | 0.7% | 0/49 | 0.8% | 0/30 | 1.7% | 1/33 | 1.1% | 0/30 | 0.6% | 0/42 |
| 2019 | 0.6% | 1/63 | 4.0% | 1/30 | 3.6% | 3/73 | 0.3% | 0/80 | 1.4% | 1/49 | 2.4% | 1/30 | 4.3% | 2/33 | 2.7% | 1/30 | 1.6% | 1/42 |
| 2024 | 0.5% | 1/73 | 3.0% | 1/30 | 2.3% | 2/80 | 0.2% | 0/80 | 1.1% | 1/64 | 1.5% | 1/51 | 2.6% | 1/38 | 1.8% | 1/30 | 1.5% | 1/42 |

=== Municipal elections ===
| Election | Ward + PR votes | Share of vote |
|---|---|---|
| 1995–96 | 230 845 | 2.7% |
| 2000 | Not released | 0.1% |
| 2006 | 185 960 | 0.9% |
| 2011 | 120,519 | 0.5% |
| 2016 | 229,281 | 0.8% |
| 2021 | 549,349 | 2.3% |
| 2026 | | 2.9% |

== See also ==
- Afrikaner
- Cape independence
- Coloureds
- Multi-Party Charter
