= The Citizen (South African newspaper) =

South African newspaper

- Type: Daily newspaper
- Owner: Caxton & CTP
- Publisher: Caxton & CTP
- Editor: Trevor Stevens
- Founded: 1976; 50 years ago
- Headquarters: Johannesburg, Gauteng, South Africa
- Country: South Africa
- ISSN: 1016-3956
- Website: citizen.co.za

The Citizen is a South African daily newspaper. Published in Johannesburg and distributed nationally, its core readership is in Gauteng.

The newspaper is owned by Caxton & CTP, a public company listed on the JSE Limited.

== History and ownership ==
The newspaper was founded in 1976 during the apartheid era by Louis Luyt, at which time it was the only major English-language newspaper favourable to the ruling National Party. In 1978, during the Muldergate Scandal, it was revealed that the money to establish and finance the newspaper had come from a secret slush fund of the Department of Information, and ultimately from the Department of Defence.

In 1998, ownership of the newspaper was transferred from Perskor to Caxton and CTP Publishers and Printers Limited. The company is involved in various fields of publishing and printing such as newspapers, magazines, commercial print, book printing, stationery, packaging and labels.

== Format ==
The Citizen is a compact newspaper. In 2012, the newspaper layout and design was revamped by Dr. Mario Garcia. On 1 August 2013 the first edition of the revamped newspaper went on sale.

== Editors (past and present) ==
Tim du Plessis

Kevin Keogh

Martin Williams

On 7 October 2013, The Citizen announced[5] that Editor Martin Williams would be stepping down. Williams, who had been with The Citizen for 19 years, retired at the end of October 2013.

Steven Motale

Martin Williams was succeeded by Steve Motale, who at the time was the executive editor of Pretoria News. Motale had started off as a reporter at The Citizen in 2002, later becoming political editor and then editor of Citizen Metro.

Trevor Stevens

Trevor Stevens, who joined The Citizen in 2001 as a sports reporter, became editor of The Citizen in 2017. He is also the current Saturday Citizen editor – a position he has held since 2010.

== Online editors (past and present) ==
Charles Cilliers (May 2016 - June 2020)

Hendri Pelser (Acting online editor: June 2020 - June 2021)

Earl Coetzee (October 2021 - April 2023)

Earl took over from Hendri Pelser as acting online editor in July 2021 and was appointed online editor in October 2021.

Gareth Cotterell (June 2023 – present)

Gareth initially joined The Citizen as digital news editor. Beginning of May 2023, he took over from then digital editor, Earl Coetzee, in acting capacity. On 6 June 2023 he was appointed digital editor of The Citizen.

== Regular columnists ==
Ben Trovato

Isaac Mashaba

William Saunderson-Meyer

Carine Hartman

Jennie Ridyard

Sydney Majoko

Brian Sokutu

Eric Naki

Reitumetse Makwea

Cliff Buchler

Danie Toerien

Martin Williams

Dirk Lotriet

Kekeletso Nakeli-Dhliwayo

Muzi Yeni

Bruce Fordyce

Wesley Botton

Jonty Mark

Ken Borland

Jonathan Mokuena

== Titles/products ==
The Citizen

Saturday Citizen (Previously Super Saturday Citizen)

The Citizen Online website

The redesigned website, citizen.co.za, went live on 1 August 2013.

The Citizen operated a subscriber paywall on citizen.co.za until 30 April 2024. On 1 May 2024, the paywall was removed and all content became free to read, with the publisher citing rising costs of maintaining the paywall and reduced value to readers relative to competitors' offerings. Existing subscribers were refunded and given a complimentary three-month e-edition subscription.

== Supplements ==
- Personal Finance (Mondays) – supplement to help you manage your money
- City (Monday-Saturday) – lifestyle and entertainment supplement
- Racing Express (Monday-Saturday) – horse racing supplement
- Phakaaathi (Tuesdays) – local and international soccer supplement
- Motoring (Wednesdays) – motoring and local motorsport supplement
- Gaming (Thursdays) – gaming supplement
- Buy in Bulk (Thursdays) – weekly wholesale supplement
- Hammer & Gavel (Fridays) – auctions supplement
- Travel (Saturdays) – travel supplement
- Your Home (last Saturday of the month) – home renovations and DIY supplement

== Distribution areas ==
	2021	2022
Eastern Cape		
Free State	Y	Y
Gauteng	Y	Y
KwaZulu-Natal	Subscriptions only	Subscriptions only
Limpopo	Y	Y
Mpumalanga	Y	Y
North West	Y	Y
Northern Cape	Y	Y
Western Cape		

== Circulation figures ==
Circulation
	Total circulation
Oct-Dec 2024	20 824
Apr-Jun 2022	26 142
Jan-Mar 2022	27 097
Oct-Nov 2021	27 492
Jul-Sep 2021	27 315
Apr-Jun 2021	29 678
Jan-Mar 2021	29 800
Oct-Dec 2020	30 012
Jul-Sep 2020	28 316
Jan-Mar 2020	36 359
Oct-Dec 2019	36 966
Jul-Sep 2019	38 270
Apr-Jun 2019	39 349
Jan-Mar 2019	40 481

== Readership figures ==
Estimated readership
	PRINT AIR
Reader Audience Data 2021 (READ 2021)	471 000

== See also ==
- List of newspapers in South Africa
