= South African Liberal Students' Association =

Student organisation in South Africa

The South African Liberal Students' Association (SALSA) exists to unify liberal student organisations across South African campuses. SALSA is the ideological descendant of the South African Liberal Association (SALA) (1936–1968), the first non-racial political organisation in South Africa (see Liberal Party of South Africa), gathering many of its liberal principles and goals in its founding constitution. SALSA is a student organisation which is not aligned with any political party; and which believes in, practices and promotes the principles of liberal democracy on campuses.

== History ==
=== South African Liberal Association and Party ===
The South African Liberal Party was founded on 9 May 1953 at a meeting of the South African Liberal Association in Cape Town. Essentially it grew out of a belief that the United Party was unable to achieve any real liberal progress in South Africa. Its establishment occurred during the "Coloured Vote" Constitutional Crisis of the 1950s, and the division of the Torch Commando on the matter of mixed membership.

Founding members of the party included (original positions in the party given):

- Margaret Ballinger (South African MP) - President of party
- Alan Paton (novelist) - Vice-President
- Leo Marquard - Vice President
- Dr Oscar Wolheim - National Chairperson
- Peter Brown - National Chairman
- Leslie Rubin (South African Senator) - Vice-Chairman
- H. Selby Msimang

For the first half of its life the Liberal Party was comparatively conservative, and saw its task primarily in terms of changing the minds of the white electorate. It leaned towards a qualified franchise. This changed in 1959–1960. The Progressive Party, formed in 1959 occupied the political ground that the Liberal Party had occupied up till then. In 1960 the Sharpeville massacre and consequent State of Emergency, during which several Liberal party members were detained, changed the outlook of the party. Another factor was the use of simultaneous translation equipment at party congresses, which enabled black rural members to speak uninhibitedly for the first time.

In the 1960s, therefore, the Liberal Party stood unequivocally for a democratic nonracial South Africa, with "one man, one vote" as its franchise policy. The Liberal Party also supported liberal candidates in the Transkei bantustan elections, and helped its rural members and others, especially in Natal, to resist the ethnic cleansing brought about by the implementation of apartheid. This led to the banning of several party members and leaders. The newspaper Contact was closely tied to the Liberal Party, although officially it was a separate publication. The link is described by Callan as follows: "Nevertheless, Contact has become so invariably associated in the public mind with the Liberal Party that it now seems merely academic to insist on its independent status. —(Paton 1968 p. 50)".

The party was in direct conflict with the South African government from the outset. This was due largely to the party's opposition to apartheid and criticism of the erosion of human rights by laws allowing detention without trial and arbitrary suppression of political opposition. Many of its members were placed under bans and persecuted by the South African government, which accused the party of furthering the aims of Communism. In 1968 the South African government passed the so-called Prohibition of Improper Interference Act, which banned parties from having a multiracial membership. The Liberal Party was therefore forced to choose between disbanding or going underground, and chose to disband. The final meeting was held in The Guildhall, Durban.

=== Students fighting apartheid ===
SALSA, the South African Liberal Students' Association, was created under the guidance of the Friedrich Naumann Foundation; for the purpose of working with students at various universities in South Africa, both white and black, from across the political spectrum. Through the generous assistance of the Friedrich Naumann Foundation, and in co-operation with the l'Union des jeunesses travaillistes libérales (UJTL), of the Parti Démocratique Sénégalais (PDS) and the West African Liberal Youth Group; SALSA served as a common forum for the exchange of ideas and the establishment of common ground between both the supporters of Apartheid and the Anti-Apartheid Movement.

Between 1983 and 1987, SALSA working with students at the University of the Witwatersrand, the University of Natal, the University of Cape Town; was based primarily at the University of Durban-Westville; and through these student activists of various political orientations, was able to ensure that the African National Congress and the National Party (South Africa) were in constant, albeit secret and covert communication, regarding the unbanning of the anti apartheid movements, the release of Nelson Mandela and other political prisoners; and the dismantling of apartheid.

Between 1986 and 1989, SALSA began a process of demanding the merger of three liberal political parties in South Africa to create the Democratic Party (South Africa) (now Democratic Alliance) from the Progressive Federal Party, which was to be supported by people of all colours. Today this party, the Democratic Alliance maintains its legitimacy as the voice of liberal democracy both in parliament and in the media, while it is the official opposition in the national assembly, and it governs in the Western Cape.

In 1987, the Government of Senegal, together with the Friedrich Naumann Foundation hosted a conference in Dakar, Senegal; which brought together leaders of the African National Congress and the Afrikaner Broederbond which represented the inner networks of white, apartheid hegemony in South Africa. Thus began the transition to non-racial democracy in South Africa, which was highlighted on 11 February 1990, by the release of Nelson Mandela, and other political prisoners, and on 27 April 1994, with the holding of the first free and fair general election in South Africa for people of all colours.

=== Founding Congress ===
Within two years of the unbanning of the African National Congress and other anti-apartheid movements, and just a year after the holding of the 1991 conference of the African National Congress, at the University of Durban-Westville, white South Africans overwhelmingly voted to end apartheid on 17 March 1992, (see South African apartheid referendum, 1992). Political organisations of every hue, were invited to participate in a Convention for a Democratic South Africa (CODESA).

In the wake of this historic milestone, the Liberal Students of South Africa, were organised again through the generous assistance of the Friedrich Naumann Foundation, the Open Society Foundation and the Anglo American Chairman's Fund, in 1992 and again in 1993 to attend conferences on the drafting of a federal manifesto for SALSA, at the University of Cape Town, under the leadership of Ryan Coetzee. These organising conferences led to the holding of the founding federal congress of SALSA at the University of the Witwatersrand in 1994, just after the first democratic elections in South Africa.

At this founding congress, SALSA elected Malcolm Lennox, of the University of the Witwatersrand, to serve as its first Federal President. SALSA's first manifesto of action was formulated in response to the marginalisation of liberal students on student representative councils and the dominance of ANC-aligned SASCO (see NUSAS) on campuses.

Created in a federal manner, SALSA devolved all power to its regional and campus based student organisations, and these liberal student bodies share the belief that the transformation of campuses can be achieved without party-political alignment, that the politicisation of educational institutions undermines liberal values, that various student organisations unnecessarily destabilised campuses at the expense of education in the name of perceived "struggles", and that the function of student political organisations is to focus on educational issues and academic excellence.

SALSA has maintained this position consistently since then and sought to consolidate liberal student support on their campuses, grow liberal student associations on other campuses, and to work with University and College SRC's to ensure that students were adequately represented.

== Activities ==
=== Building leadership capacity ===
SALSA provides opportunities for liberal students to participate in leadership training and academic support programs. The organization assists liberal students with career and life development, while keeping SALSA Alumni connected to current liberal students.

=== Reshaping the higher education landscape ===
SALSA having worked closely with other student organisations to draft the Higher Education Act of 1997, participated in the drafting of the Size and Shape Report which was released in 2000, and the National Plan for Higher Education which was published for comment in 2001/2. SALSA won many of its demands in the Revised National Plan for Higher Education in 2003, and through the leadership of James Dray in 2005/6, was able to contribute meaningfully to the process of the rationalisation of the FET Colleges, and the mergers of black and white universities to create a new landscape for higher education.

=== Manifesto 2006–2010 ===
SALSA has spent the last 5 years lobbying the ANC government to make serious improvements to the National Student Financial Aid Scheme (TEFSA/NSFAS) mechanism for funding disadvantaged students in South Africa, and is both pleased with the recent announcements regarding adjustments to National Research Foundation (NRF) funding packages for postgraduate studies, as well as adjustments to the NSFAS loan/bursary conditions for undergraduate students; and the decision to consolidate the Sector Education Training Authorities (SETA's) with the Further Education and Training Colleges (FET's), so as to ensure that the Skills Development Levies, as collected as being 1% of the national wage bill, goes directly to providing learnerships and vocational training opportunities.

SALSA believes that more can be achieved to enhance the rights and opportunities afforded to young people and will continue to lobby the ANC government to implement SALSA's policy of the NSFAS Bank model for the achievement of accessible higher education, based on the principle of direct loan/bursary funding of students (rather than indirect subsidies and funding via universities and colleges), competitive research-led, higher education institutions, all of which is predicated upon higher education costs being wholly tax-deductible.

SALSA's goal is to assist young graduates in being able to expend more disposable income on establishing their homes, reinvesting in their extended families and incurring less debt in the first 5 years of their working lives after graduation. SALSA believes that this economic development initiative will enhance the earning, saving and investment potential of highly skilled young graduates in South Africa, enabling them to become catalysts for opportunity transfers to other people and younger students and learners in need.

Over and above these activities, SALSA remains committed to supporting the work of the Organisation of African Liberal Youth, the Coalition of Liberal African Youth, the Africa Union Youth Forum, the Africa Liberal Network, the Africa Liberal Network Youth, the West African Liberal Youth Group, the Liberal Youth of Southern Africa, and the International Federation of Liberal Youth and its member and regional organisations throughout the world.

== Networks ==
SALSA is a founding member of the Organisation of African Liberal Youth (OALY) and is a full member of the International Federation of Liberal Youth (IFLRY). In the spirit of global peace and intercultural learning, SALSA makes its training and support programs available to all of its partner Liberal Youth and Student Organisations, throughout the world.
