= Randolph Vigne =

South African anti-apartheid activist

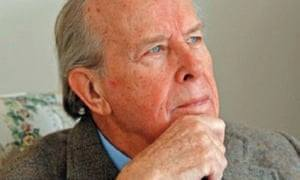
- Born: 1928; Kimberley, Northern Cape
- Died: 19 June 2016 (aged 87–88); Canterbury, England
- Other name: James Randolph Vigne
- Education: Wadham College, Oxford
- Occupation: anti-apartheid activist
- Notable work: Liberals Against Apartheid
- Awards: Order of Luthuli in silver

James Randolph Vigne OLS FSA (1928 – 19 June 2016) was a South African anti-apartheid activist. He was an influential member of the Liberal Party of South Africa, a founding member of the National Committee for Liberation, and the founder of the African Resistance Movement (ARM).

== Biography ==
Vigne was born in 1928 in Kimberley, Northern Cape, attended primary school in Port Elizabeth and did his high schooling at St. Andrew's College, Grahamstown, where he enjoyed a spell as head boy at the age of 13 in 1941. That same year he joined the Van Riebeeck Society. He did his higher education at Wadham College, Oxford, after which he returned to Cape Town and served as English editor at the publisher Maskew Miller until 1964.

Vigne was banned for five years in 1963 under the Suppression of Communism Act, for his activities in Transkei in organising opposition to the Transkei Bantustan. He went into exile in Britain in 1964, where he founded the Namibia Support Committee. For a period he was a member of the Pan Africanist Congress. He wrote widely on South Africa and Namibian politics and history.

He served as a director of the French Hospital for some thirty years and was its treasurer for ten.

Vigne died in Canterbury, England, on 19 June 2016.

== Published works ==
- Bessie Head (1991). Randolph Vigne (ed.). A Gesture of Belonging: Letters from Bessie Head, 1965–1979. SA Writers. ISBN 978-0-435-08059-4.
- Elder, Arlene A.; Abrahams, Cecil; Vigne, Randolph (1993). "Bessie Head: New Considerations, Continuing Questions". Callaloo. 16 (1): 277. doi:10.2307/2931833. ISSN 0161-2492. JSTOR 2931833.
- Vigne, Randolph (1997). Liberals Against Apartheid: A History of the Liberal Party of South Africa, 1953–68. MacMillan. ISBN 978-0-312-17738-6.
- Vigne, Randolph (1998). "South Africa's First Published Work of Literature and its Author, Pierre Simond". South African Historical Journal. 39 (1): 3–16. doi:10.1080/02582479808671326. ISSN 0258-2473.
- Vigne, Randolph (2007). "SWAPO of Namibia: A movement in exile". Third World Quarterly. 9 (1): 85–107. doi:10.1080/01436598708419963. ISSN 0143-6597.
- Murdoch, Tessa; Vigne, Randolph (2009). The French Hospital in England:Its Huguenot History and Collections (1st ed.). Cambridge: John Adamson. ISBN 978-0-9524322-7-2. OCLC 318092110.
- Vigne, Randolph (2011). "Lady Russell's Cup, 1703". The Antiquaries Journal. 76: 258–262. doi:10.1017/S0003581500047570. ISSN 0003-5815.
- Vigne, Randolph (2012). Thomas Pringle: South African Pioneer, Poet and Abolitionist. Boydell & Brewer Ltd. ISBN 978-1-84701-052-0.
- Vigne, Randolph (2013). "Mapping and promoting South Africa: Barrow and Burchell's rivalry". Historia. 58 (1): 18–32.

== Honours and awards ==
In April 2010 Vigne was awarded the Order of Luthuli in Silver for "his contribution to the struggle for a democratic, free and non-racial South Africa".

== Sources ==
- Driver, C. J.; Sampson, Anthony (1980). Patrick Duncan: South African and Pan-African. James Currey Publishers. ISBN 978-0-85255-773-0.
- Swanepoel, Petrus Cornelius (2007). Really Inside BOSS: A Tale of South Africa's Late Intelligence Service (and Something about the CIA). Piet Swanepoel. ISBN 978-0-620-38272-4.
