= Neville Colman =

South African Hematologist (1945-2003)

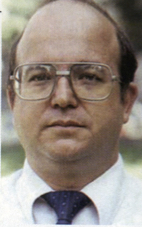
- Born: July 30, 1945; Germiston, South Africa
- Died: February 11, 2003 (aged 57); New York, U.S.
- Occupation: Hematologist

Neville Colman (July 30, 1945 – February 11, 2003) was a South African-American-born hematologist and forensic DNA expert who made ground-breaking discoveries about folate and nutrition. He also founded the West Side Soccer League, the largest all-volunteer sports organization in New York City. There is a sports field named after him in NYC's Riverside Park.

== Early life ==
Colman was born in Germiston, South Africa, and attended the University of the Witwatersrand, where he received doctorates in medicine and pathology, as well as a masters in nuclear medicine. He was also described as an "outstanding athlete". He left South Africa in 1974, due to his opposition to the apartheid regime, and emigrated to the United States.

== Medical career ==
Colman was chief of diagnostic pathology and clinical medicine for Continuum Health Partners, including St. Luke's–Roosevelt Hospital Center (now Mount Sinai West) and Beth Israel Hospital. He was also a professor and vice chairman of pathology at Columbia University's College of Physicians and Surgeons. Prior to working at St. Luke's-Roosevelt, he was the head of the Center for Clinical Laboratories at Mount Sinai Hospital.

Colman is credited with ground-breaking research on folate. During his doctoral research at the University of Witwatersrand, he discovered that the anemia suffered in many rural communities under attack from apartheid was caused by a folate deficiency. His research eventually led to the fortification of food products with folic acid, which is endorsed by the World Health Organization and the United States Food and Drug Administration. For much of his medical career, he worked closely with Victor Herbert on folate research.

He also developed a technique for delivering supplementary vitamin B-12 with a nasal gel to those with Crohn's disease.

Colman also worked extensively in the area of DNA research, calling for increased standards in its use as a forensic tool. Throughout the 1980s, he collaborated with attorney Peter Neufeld on work about the proper use of new scientific techniques in criminal cases. Colman frequently provided expert testimony in criminal cases on the veracity of DNA fingerprinting and quality control in criminology laboratories. Colman and Neufeld identified a problem with the lax regulation of crime laboratories, noting "there is more regulation of clinical laboratories that determine whether one has mononucleosis than there is of forensic laboratories able to produce DNA test results that can help send a person to the electric chair." In 1990, Colman and Neufeld summed up this work in an article in Scientific American, which was reprinted in numerous textbooks. The National Research Council of the National Academy of Sciences released their own policy on rigor and oversight in forensic science two years later.

== Other activities ==
=== Political ===
Before emigrating to the United States, Colman was active in the anti-apartheid movement in South Africa. He assisted in the making of two documentaries about apartheid, End of the Dialogue and Last Grave at Dimbaza, which were filmed secretly by British film students, and conceived by members of the Pan Africanist Congress in exile in London. Colman was also active in the National Union of South African Students, and was a member of the Liberal Party of South Africa until it was banned by the South African government in 1968.

Colman left South Africa in 1974, due to his opposition to the apartheid regime, and emigrated to the United States. His experience is featured in The Rift, Hilda Bernstein's book on South African exiles. Bernstein interviewed Colman in New York City, and the interview is in file at the University of the Witwatersrand Historical Papers Research Archive.

=== West Side Soccer League ===
In 1987, Colman founded the West Side Soccer League. He was the league's regional commissioner from 1987 to 1996. He went on to become New York area director of the American Youth Soccer Organization. According to one source, Colman grew up playing soccer in South Africa and worked to educate American parents who had no soccer experience about the game. In 2005, after Colman's death, a sports field in Riverside Park was named Neville Colman Field in honor of his contributions to youth soccer in New York City.

== Death ==
Colman died in 2003 in New York City. The cause of death was metastasized gastric cancer.

== Selected publications ==
- Colman, Neville; Herbert, V. (1977). "Transport and delivery of folate". Topics on Hematology. Amsterdam: Exerpta Medica.
- Colman, Neville; Herbert, V. (1977). "Folate binders in cerebrospinal fluid". Clinical Research. 25 (3): A336.
- Colman, Neville; Gardner, Ann; Herbert, Victor (1979). "Non-mutagenicity of gossypol in the salmonella/mammalian-microsome plate assay". Environmental Mutagenesis. 1 (4): 315–320. doi:10.1002/em.2860010403. ISSN 0192-2521. PMID 399915.
- Colman, Neville (2009). "Addition of Folic Acid to Staple Foods as a Selective Nutrition Intervention Strategy". Nutrition Reviews. 40 (8): 225–233. doi:10.1111/j.1753-4887.1982.tb05319.x. ISSN 0029-6643. PMID 6752767.
- Colman, N (1983). "The use of food fortification to prevent folate deficiency". Nutrition Intervention Strategies in National Development. Oxford: Elsevier Science: 343–361. doi:10.1016/B978-0-12-709080-1.50036-2. hdl:10539/16990. ISBN 9780127090801.
- Rana, Sohail R.; Colman, Neville; Goh, Kong-Oo; Herbert, Victor; Klemperer, Martin R. (1983). "Transcobalamin II deficiency associated with unusual bone marrow findings and chromosomal abnormalities". American Journal of Hematology. 14 (1): 89–96. doi:10.1002/ajh.2830140111. ISSN 0361-8609. PMID 6837569. S2CID 43417492.
- Shaw, S; Jayatilleke, E; Herbert, V; Colman, N (1989). "Cleavage of folates during ethanol metabolism. Role of acetaldehyde/xanthine oxidase-generated superoxide". Biochemical Journal. 257 (1): 277–280. doi:10.1042/bj2570277. ISSN 0264-6021. PMC 1135567. PMID 2537625.
