= Hugh Lewin =

South African anti-apartheid activist and writer (1939–2019)

Hugh Lewin (3 December 1939 – 16 January 2019) was a South African anti-apartheid activist and writer. He was imprisoned from 1964 to 1971 for his activities in support of the African Resistance Movement, and then spent 20 years in exile, returning to South Africa in 1992. An account of his experience, Bandiet (Afrikaans: "bandit"), won the Olive Schreiner Prize in 2003.

== Early life ==
Lewin was born in Lydenburg, then in the Transvaal. His parents were Anglican missionaries, William and Muriel (née Paynter). His father, William, was the brother of Francis Lewin, captain of HMS Veronica, (and great grandfather to John Rees-Evans).

In London in the 1970s, Lewin discovered he had maternal Jewish ancestry, but he was not a practising Jew.

He was educated at Rhodes University and then became a journalist at the Natal Witness in Pietermaritzburg, also writing for Drum magazine and Golden City Post in Johannesburg.

== Anti-apartheid activism ==
He joined the Liberal Party in 1959. Lewin was an anti-apartheid activist, and was imprisoned for seven years from July 1964 for his activities in support of the African Resistance Movement. Evidence was given against him by his friends and fellow activists Adrian Leftwich (who had been best man at Lewin's wedding) and John Lloyd. After serving the full seven-year prison sentence in Pretoria Central Prison, he was given a "permanent departure permit" and left South Africa in 1971.

== Exile ==
Lewin lived for 10 years each in London and Zimbabwe. In London, he was an information officer for the International Defence and Aid Fund, and also worked as journalist for The Observer and The Guardian. Moving to newly independent Zimbabwe in 1981, he was a founding member of the Dambudzo Marechera Trust.

== Return to South Africa ==
He returned to South Africa in 1992, amid the negotiations to end apartheid in South Africa. He became of director of the Institute for the Advancement of Journalism. He co-founded Baobab Press with Irene Staunton. He worked for the Truth and Reconciliation Commission as a member of its Human Rights Violations Committee.

He had kept a secret record of his experiences in prison on the pages of a Bible, and published Bandiet: Seven Years in a South African Prison in London in 1974 (the title Bandiet being Afrikaans for "bandit"). He also wrote the "Jafta" series of books for children and young adults. After being banned for many years, his 1974 prison memoir was republished in South Africa with new material in 2002, as Bandiet: Out of Jail, illustrated by Harold Strachan. It won the 2003 Olive Schreiner Prize, and Stones against the Mirror won the 2011 Sunday Times Alan Paton Award.

== Private life ==
Lewin first married fellow activist Elizabeth Pitman (later Franklin) and they both were active in Liberal Party of South Africa. He later married Pat Davidson, a solicitor. They had two daughters, Thandi and Tessa. They later divorced, and his partner for many years was Fiona Lloyd. He suffered with Lewy body dementia in his later years. He died in Killarney, Johannesburg.
