= Harold Strachan =

South African artist, freedom fighter, and writer (1925–2020)

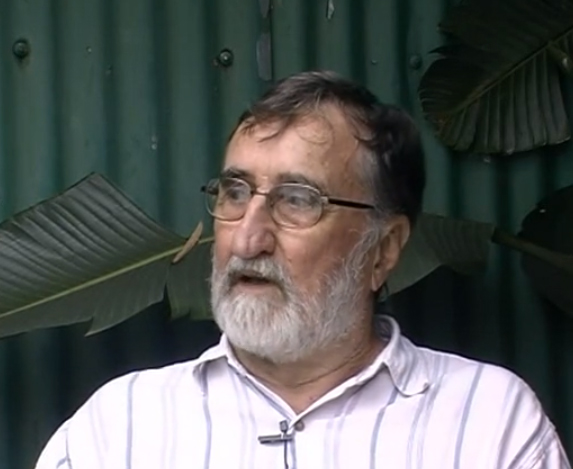
- A still from an interview with Strachan in 2010
- Born: Robert Harold Lundie Strachan; 1 December 1925; Pretoria, South Africa
- Died: 7 February 2020 (aged 94)
- Occupations: Anti-apartheid activist; writer; artist
- Notable work: Way Up, Way Out; Make a Skyf, Man!
- Spouses: Jean Middleton (1950–1958); Maggie Strachan (m. 1959)
- Military career
- Allegiance: South Africa
- Branch: South African Air Force
- Service years: 1943–1946
- Rank: Lieutenant (SAAF)
- Conflicts: World War II

Umkhonto we Sizwe Chief of Explosives
- In office 1961–1963
- Criminal information
- Status: Released
- Criminal charge: Sabotage
- Penalty: 3 years prison

Robert Harold Lundie "Jock" Strachan (1 December 1925 – 7 February 2020) was a white South African writer and anti-apartheid activist. He flew for the South African Air Force during the Second World War, trained as an artist, then became Umkhonto we Sizwe's first explosives expert. He was imprisoned for sabotage, and after his release served another sentence for telling a journalist about poor prison conditions. He wrote two semi-autobiographical books, and completed the Comrades Marathon twice, winning a medal once. He married twice and had three children.

== Early life, art and running ==
Harold Strachan was born in Pretoria on 1 December 1925. His father had been a metalworker in the Clyde shipyards who had emigrated from Scotland to South Africa in 1902, and his mother was a teacher from an Afrikaner family. (Note: In Way Up, Way Out, Strachan calls them "hensoppers", a term from the Second Anglo-Boer War. It was used to describe Afrikaners who sought compromise with the British at the end of the war.) When Harold was three his mother left his father for another Scotsman, Jimmy Brown. Brown died in 1931 from the effects of poison gas in the First World War, and his mother moved with Harold and his two sisters to Pietermaritzburg in Natal. He attended Merchiston Preparatory School then Maritzburg College, where he began to develop his political consciousness.

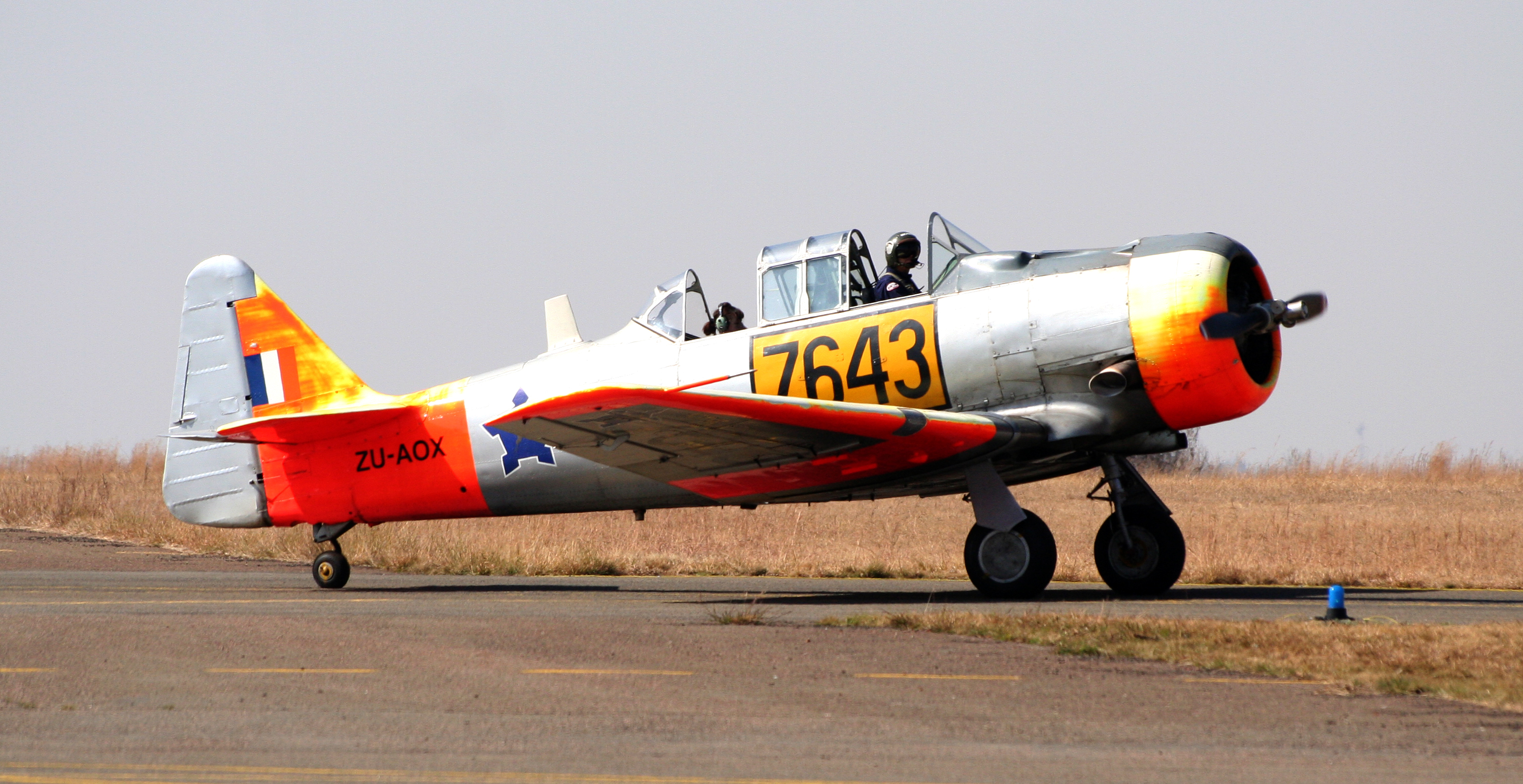
A Harvard of the SAAF

Strachan joined the South African Air Force straight from school, and served as a pilot towards the end of the Second World War with the rank of lieutenant. He trained on the Tiger Moth and did advanced training on the Airspeed Oxford. From 1946 to 1949 he studied for a Fine Arts degree at Natal University College in Pietermaritzburg. In 1948 the ruling National Party introduced apartheid, a system of institutionalised racial segregation and discrimination against the black majority. In 1949 Strachan completed the Comrades Marathon, an 89-kilometre (55 mi) ultramarathon run between Pietermaritzburg and Durban. For a period after he left the air force, as a reservist he used to enjoy spending a month of each year flying the Harvard to keep his proficiency.

In 1950 Strachan won a scholarship to study at the Camberwell School of Arts and Crafts in London, and married fellow South African Jean Middleton. In 1951 he took a course in painting restoration at the State Academy of Fine Arts in Stuttgart. In 1952 he returned to London and worked as a security guard, and in 1953 he managed his brother-in-law's painting and decorating business in Chingola in Northern Rhodesia (now Zambia), where he encouraged the black workers to unionise. During the 1950s he worked with the artist Selby Mvusi. Before he ran the 1954 Comrades Marathon, Strachan is supposed to have prepared for the race by drinking gin and vermouth with his wife. He finished sixth in 7 h 48 min and earned a gold medal. He was friendly with the English satirist Tom Sharpe until they fell out over a woman. Strachan worked as a lecturer and teacher from 1955 to 1960. He was divorced from Middleton in 1958.

== Activism, sabotage and imprisonment ==
Strachan's opposition to apartheid arose from his personal ethics, rather than ideology. He became a founder member of the Liberal Party of South Africa in 1954, along with Alan Paton and Peter Brown, and in 1957 joined the Congress of Democrats. In 1959 he married Maggie von Lier, his former student. In 1960, during the protests after the Sharpeville massacre, he and Maggie stood between armed police and black protesters, preventing the police from firing. (Note: Along with "an Indian bloke called Bugwandeen" from the Natal Indian Congress, and Anthony de Crespigny.) A warrant was issued for their arrest, and to avoid it they fled to Swaziland. (Note: A member of the public had recognised Strachan by his Comrades Marathon blazer.) Three months later they returned to South Africa, Harold under the name Robert "Jock" Lundie, and settled in Port Elizabeth where Harold worked with Govan Mbeki, and helped him produce and distribute the newsletter Izwe Lomzi ("Voice of the People"). (Note: Govan Mbeki's son Thabo Mbeki later served as President of South Africa from 1999–2008.) In 1961 he joined the illegal South African Communist Party (SACP), and edited their newspaper New Age. He accepted Mbeki's request to improvise explosive devices for the newly-formed Umkhonto we Sizwe (MK), (Note: The armed wing of the African National Congress, formed in 1961 after the ANC were banned.) and experimented with substances such as nitric acid, potassium permanganate, magnesium, glycerol and icing sugar.

...this was our job – devices and explosives. So I said, for God's sake, why me? And they said, no well, you were a bomber pilot in the war, you see, so you must know how to make bombs. I said, but for Christ's sake, Govan, we didn't make our own bombs. And they said, but you know about those things and I said, no, bombs were made in bloody factories, I don't know. So he said, anyway, you’re appointed. We did a good job, actually.

— Strachan, quoted by Zoë Molver

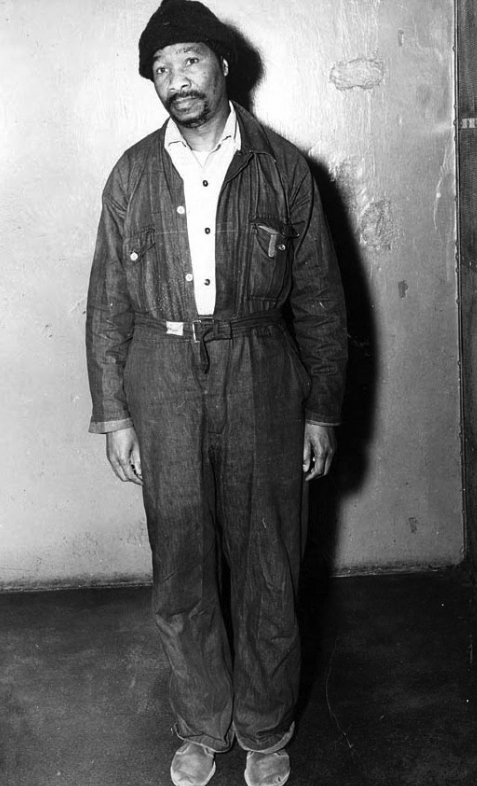
Govan Mbeki under arrest in 1963

Strachan, who was MK's first explosives expert, designed a simple incendiary device based on petrol and initiated by glycerol filtering through beach sand onto potassium permanganate. He later researched and created an explosive device based on a form of ammonal, inspired by his reading of Robert Graves. He trained other operatives, who then disseminated the expertise through a clandestine cell system. His home-made bombs were planted at strategic infrastructure targets like electrical substations and railway lines. As far as is known, there were no deaths in these attacks.

He was caught when one of his trainees planted an improperly constructed incendiary device in the magistrate's court in Butterworth. It failed to go off, was discovered, and the operative was traced by fingerprint evidence. When tortured by the police he revealed Strachan's address. Strachan was arrested at gunpoint and tried under the Explosives Act. He was found guilty of sabotage on 8 May 1962, and sentenced to six years' imprisonment, with three years suspended. (Note: He and Maggie had previously been acquitted of riotous assembly for the 1960 incident in Durban, on the grounds that although they had refused to move when ordered, the rest of the crowd had dispersed, and so no offence was committed.) He served thirteen months of his sentence in solitary confinement in Pretoria Central Prison, and had his teeth removed. He passed the time in solitary constructing a Tiger Moth in his imagination then preparing an aerobatics routine for it. When Strachan was named as a conspirator in the Rivonia Trial in 1963–64, he refused to give evidence against Mbeki and Denis Goldberg, even when he was threatened with hanging. Most of the accused at Rivonia (including Nelson Mandela) got life imprisonment as the law had been strengthened after Strachan's trial. On 31 March 1965 Strachan faced a further trial for other bomb attacks but was found not guilty. He was released in May.

On his release, he gave an account of his life in prison to the journalist Benjamin Pogrund, who used it to write an article critical of the conditions under which prisoners were kept, which included frequent assaults and poor sanitary conditions. When the story was published in the Rand Daily Mail, in late June and early July 1965, the government invoked the Prisons Act. In the subsequent court case, a fellow saboteur gave evidence contradicting Strachan's allegations, and in May 1966 Strachan was imprisoned for 2 1/2 years. (Note: The Prisons Act stated that anyone writing about prisons had to be able to prove the truth of their statements. The government also took action against the Mail, which resulted in the editor, Laurence Gandar, losing his job.) This was reduced to 1 1/2 on appeal, then to one year via an amnesty. During his second incarceration he was not allowed to read or study; he helped raise the morale of fellow political prisoners by designing props and costumes for amateur dramatics. Strachan's case and the publicity around it made the South African media much more cautious about publishing anything critical of any government agency; in the longer term they led to a process of prison reform which helped the next generation of political prisoners such as Mandela.

Following his second release Strachan was banned from public gatherings until 1975 under the Suppression of Communism Act, 1950, and was also placed under house arrest for the last five years. In 1968 and 1972, Strachan applied to run in the Comrades Marathon, but was refused permission both times by the Chief Magistrate. In 1978, and again in 1979, unknown assailants fired shots at his house, leading him to fortify parts of it with steel plate and breeze blocks. The stress of imprisonment, banning, and the attacks on his home led to family difficulties. Ben Turok wrote in his autobiography that in the 1973 Durban strikes he had channelled funds via Strachan to support trade unions without the permission of the SACP, and that Turok had been expelled from the party for refusing to reveal his contact. Strachan was unusual among white activists in that he did not go into exile following his release but stayed on in South Africa. He acknowledged the support of his wife over the decades when he was unable to work. They had a daughter, Susie, and a son, Joe, and separated in the mid-1990s. Maggie Strachan went on to become a well-known local artist. Harold Strachan had a third child in France who he never met.

== Later life, writing, and death ==
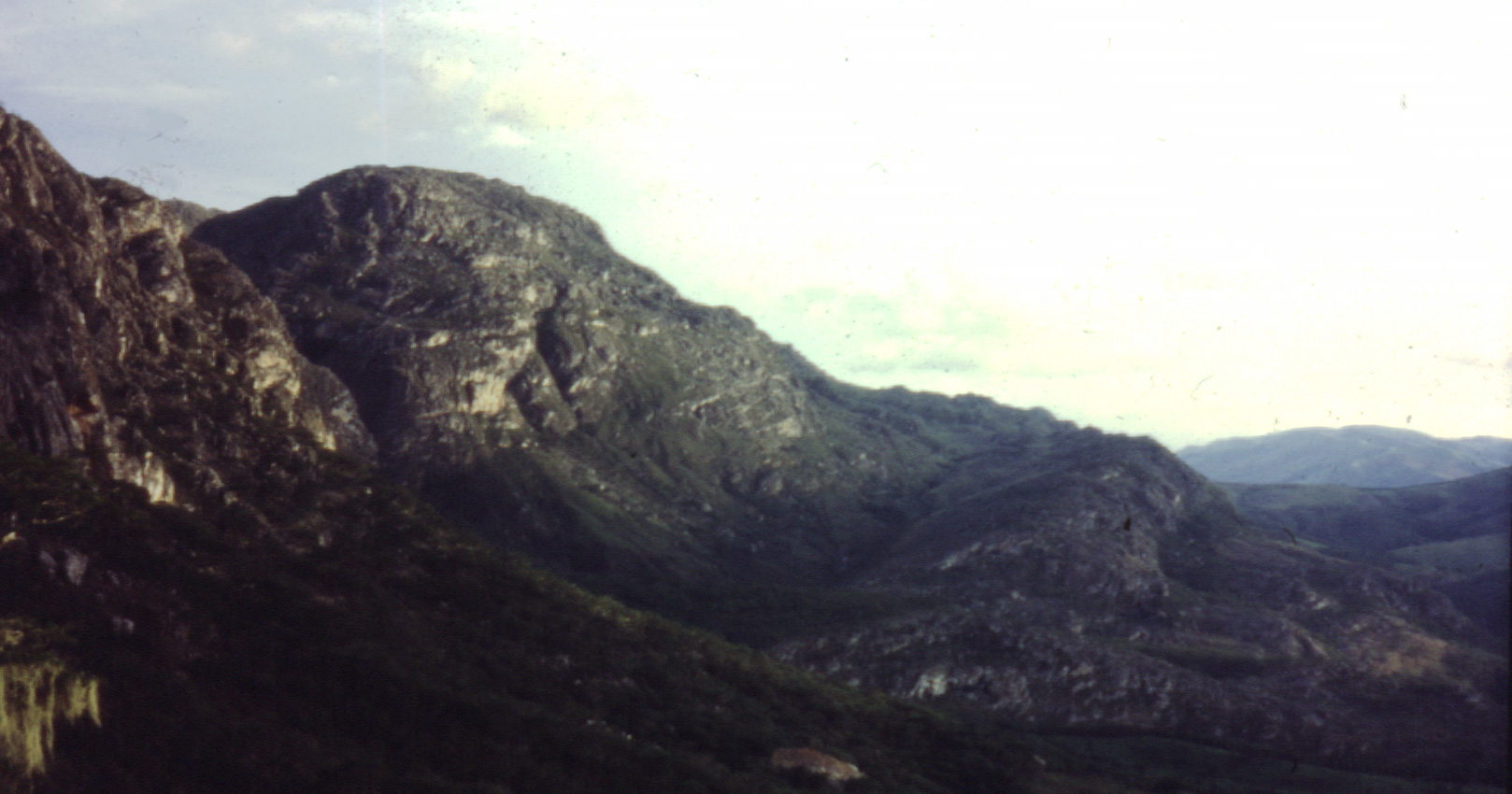
Drakensberg mountains, South Africa

In 1990, Mandela was released on the orders of F. W. de Klerk; most apartheid legislation came to an end the following year. This was decisively endorsed by the ruling white minority in a 1992 referendum. That year, Mbeki and Strachan had a tearful reunion at the African National Congress (ANC) congress in Durban.

"You know, Govan, we were quite brave", said Harold. "My God", said Mbeki, "We were fucking brave, we really were."

Strachan became publicly alienated from the ANC because of what he saw as their authoritarian tendencies and the indiscriminate bombing campaigns they carried out after his imprisonment; in return, the ANC ensured that he was marginalised once they came to power. In South Africa's first majority election in 1994, when Mandela became the country's first democratically elected president, Strachan voted for the Democratic Party. He testified to the Truth and Reconciliation Commission in 1996 and 1997.

His artistic career was held back by his activism, but he has paintings in the collection of Durban Art Gallery (Note: "Nature Morte" depicts a dead protester in Durban in 1960, and was purchased in 1970. In 1995 the gallery also bought Strachan's 1964 self-portrait.) and in private collections. He worked as an art restorer, and illustrated Hugh Lewin's book Bandiet: Out Of Jail.

In 1997, after his wife left him, a friend persuaded him to get a computer and to learn to type. He wrote an original manuscript, titled So It Goes, (Note: A reference to the anti-war book Slaughterhouse-Five by Kurt Vonnegut.) in six weeks. It was published as Way Up, Way Out in 1998, and describes his childhood in Pretoria, his schooling in Natal and his pilot training. It includes his descriptions of walking in the Drakensberg mountains, which he continued as his children grew up. Dan Jacobson commented in the London Review of Books that Strachan had "seized eagerly on the expressive potentialities of South African English demotic speech ... in order to make something new and rare of it". He made a link between the protagonist's "call to arms" in the Second World War and the author's motivation in his struggle against apartheid. Strachan was disappointed with the edited version that was published. Critics have debated whether it should be viewed as fiction or autobiography; Jacobson called it a Bildungsroman.

His second book, Make a Skyf, Man! (2004) (Note: A skyf is Afrikaans-derived South African slang for a cigarette or cannabis joint.) is about his time in MK and in prison. He describes his involvement as a "boys' own armed struggle"; one passage depicts a successful demonstration of a bomb to a senior comrade (Yoshke, based on Joe Slovo) by blowing up a beach toilet:

Yoshke grips my left arm and cries 'Power, Comrade!' and Max on my right grips the arm on that side and declares 'Comrade, if we're going to conquer all South Africa one shithouse at a time we'll all be in the grave before liberation ...'

The book begins and ends with stories about angling for shad, a longstanding passion of Strachan's. Both books are autobiographical fiction and were based on anecdotes he told. He described how he tried to use the techniques of painting, such as contrast of texture, in his writing, and expressed his admiration for the writing style of John Bunyan and Laurence Sterne (Tristram Shandy was his favourite book in prison), and the emotional authenticity of Thomas Hardy and Graham Greene. He also wrote regular columns for publications including the Weekend Witness and Noseweek. He remained as astrant (Afrikaans for "irreverent") in post-apartheid South Africa as he was as an activist.

In April 2011 he was awarded an honorary doctorate by the Durban University of Technology in recognition of his contributions to art and democracy. In June 2011 he underwent triple coronary artery bypass surgery after suffering chest pains.

Strachan moved to a care home in September 2019, and died from complications of liver disease on 7 February 2020, aged 94. He was cremated, and there was no funeral according to his wishes.
