= Jim Mokoena =

Mosotho author and radio producer

- Born: September 18, 1968 (age 58); Mamafubedu near Petrus Steyn, Free State, South Africa
- Occupations: Author; Radio producer
- Employer: Lesedi FM (formerly Radio Lesedi)
- Writing career
- Language: Sesotho
- Genres: Fiction; Education
- Notable works: Matubatsana; Ntataselala; Sekgametsi wa Diphakweng

Jim Mokoena (born 18 September 1968) is a Mosotho author and radio producer known for writing several works in the Sesotho language, including the novel Matubatsana. He has contributed to Sesotho literature and to broadcasting through his work with Lesedi FM, formerly Radio Lesedi.

== Early life ==
Mokoena was born on 18 September 1968 on a farm called Pardy in Mamafubedu, near Petrus Steyn in the Free State province of South Africa. He grew up within the Basotho cultural environment that would later influence his literary interests and writing in Sesotho.

== Career ==
Mokoena began his professional career working as a receptionist. He later joined Radio Lesedi, a Sesotho-language radio station operated by the South African Broadcasting Corporation (SABC), where he became a producer, contributing to the promotion of language and culture. His novel Matubatsana was listed as a finalist for the 1999 M-Net Book Prize in the Sotho language category.

== Bibliography ==
Mokoena Jim has authored several works in Sesotho, including:

- Mokoena, J (1998). Matubatsana. Creative Writing Series. Maskew Miller Longman. ISBN 978-0-7986-4754-0.
- Mokoena, Jim (2007). Mehla le matsatsi (in Southern Sotho). Vivlia. ISBN 978-1-77006-592-5.
- Mokoena, Jim (2007). Se a foka se fete (in Southern Sotho). BARD. ISBN 978-1-920148-06-5.
- Mokoena, Jim (2013). Ntataselala: padi ya Sesotho. Kereite ya 8 (in Southern Sotho). Vivlia. ISBN 978-1-4307-2396-7.
- Mokoena, Jim (2015). Lekgapetla la panana Padi. Kereite ya 11. First league Trading C.C. ISBN 9781430721178.
- Mokoena, Jim (2018). Sekgametsi wa Diphakweng: (a betrothed woman from Diphakweng). Mosa Media & Book Distributors. ISBN 978-0-9947134-8-3.
