= Patrick Duncan =

Patrick Duncan may refer to:

- Sir Patrick Duncan (South African politician) (1870–1943), Governor-General of South Africa
- Patrick Sheane Duncan (born 1947), American writer, film producer and director
- Paddy Duncan (1894–1949), Irish footballer
- Patrick Duncan (anti-apartheid activist) (1918–1967)
- Pat Duncan (baseball) (1893–1960), baseball player
- Pat Duncan (born 1960), Canadian Liberal politician
