= Boraine =

Boraine is a surname. Notable people with the surname include:

- Alex Boraine (1931–2018), South African politician and activist
- Andrew Boraine (born 1959), South African expert on economic and urban development
- Nick Boraine (born 1971), South African actor
- Clyde Boraine (born 1988), South African born, Australian actor
