= Cape Town Partnership =

South African public-private partnership

- Formation: 1999
- Dissolved: 2017
- Type: Neighborhood and business improvement Private-Public Partnership organisation
- Purpose: To mobilise and align public, private and social resources towards Cape Town’s urban regeneration.
- Headquarters: 11th Floor, 36 Bree Street, Cape Town, South Africa.
- Location: Cape Town, South Africa
- Region served: Cape Town City Bowl
- Chief Executive Officer: Bulelwa Makalima-Ngewana
- Affiliations: Cape Town CCID; Cape Town Tourism
- Staff: ~40
- Website: www.capetownpartnership.co.za

The Cape Town Partnership was a Cape Town-based collaborative public-private partnership organisation that existed to develop, promote and manage areas of the Cape Town central business district as a place for all citizens. The Cape Town Partnership was an independent non-profit organisation (Section 21 company) governed by a board of directors. Michael Farr was the first Chief Executive of the Partnership from 1999 until 2003. Andrew Boraine was the Chief executive of the Partnership from 2003 until 2013. Bulelwa Makalima-Ngewana succeeded Boraine as CEO in 2013 until the organisation's closure in 2017. The City of Cape Town stopped funding for the Cape Town Partnership in 2017 leading to its closure later that same year.

The Partnership was created in 1999 when the City of Cape Town, the South African Property Owners Association (SAPOA), the Cape Town Regional Chamber of Commerce and Industry and other stakeholders came together to address the impact of urban decay, capital flight and the wicked problems present in Cape Town's City Bowl/Central Business District (CBD) area.

It was decided that a Business improvement district model would be best suited and so the Central City Improvement District was created in November 2000 in partnership with property owners within the central city area to provide complementary municipal services over and above what the City of Cape Town provided. Safety, cleaning and social development are focus areas of the Central City Improvement District.

The Partnership promoted investment within the CBD whilst seeking to reduce the negative impact of gentrification and development-induced displacement.

Projects that the Partnership contributed towards were the City of Cape Town's Bus Rapid Transit system, the revitalisation of Cape Town's central square, Grand Parade (which served as a successful FIFA Fan Fest area during the 2010 FIFA Football World Cup), the successful bid for Cape Town to be designated World Design Capital 2014, and the redesign and implementation of the upgrade of Cape Town's Church Square among others. The Cape Town Partnership was involved in street-level activations such as the facilitating and co-sponsoring the first smart bench in Cape Town, performances of famous musicians in public spaces, and in making public spaces in Cape Town's central business district more convenient as places of cultural expression, as seen by the #100AfricanReads project during City Walk Saturdays.
