= Make a Skyf, Man! =

- Author: Harold Strachan
- Language: English
- Genre: Autobiographical novel
- Publisher: Jacana
- Publication date: 2004
- Publication place: South Africa
- Media type: Print (hardback & paperback)
- Pages: 276
- ISBN: 978-1-77009-033-0
- Dewey Decimal: 364.092
- Preceded by: Way Up, Way Out

Make a Skyf, Man! (Note: A skyf is Afrikaans-derived South African slang for a cigarette or cannabis joint.) is a work of autobiographical fiction by the anti-apartheid activist Harold Strachan. It was published in 2004.

== Plot ==
The book depicts Jock Lundie, a fictionalised version of Strachan, and his involvement in the resistance movement against apartheid, starting with the Congress of Democrats then being a bomb-maker for Umkhonto we Sizwe. He describes his involvement as a "boys' own armed struggle"; one passage depicts a successful demonstration of a home-made bomb to a senior comrade (Yoshke, based on Joe Slovo) by blowing up a beach toilet:

Yoshke grips my left arm and cries 'Power, Comrade!' and Max on my right grips the arm on that side and declares 'Comrade, if we're going to conquer all South Africa one shithouse at a time we'll all be in the grave before liberation ...'

Lundie gets arrested and serves three years in prison. He passes the time in solitary constructing a Tiger Moth in his imagination then preparing an aerobatics routine for it. Books are difficult to get and their pages are highly prized for making cigarettes or cannabis joints. As a result many books have pages missing. A former comrade, Themba Max, is executed. (Note: He was written as a composite character between Vuyisile Mini and Joseph Jack.)

Near the end of the book, Lundie is released after being found not guilty in a further trial thanks to the benevolent perjury of his neighbour who gives him an alibi. He moves back in with his wife Jess, gets to know his three-year-old daughter, and ejects his wife's boyfriend from the family home.

The book begins and ends with stories about angling for shad, a longstanding passion of Strachan's.

== Style ==
The book is loosely chronological but there are many diversions into South African history. It is written in South African English, with extensive use of Afrikaans phrases. The book is autobiographical fiction and was based on anecdotes he told. He has described how he tries to use the techniques of painting, such as contrast of texture, in his writing, and has expressed his admiration for the writing style of John Bunyan and Laurence Sterne, and the emotional authenticity of Thomas Hardy and Graham Greene.

== Reception ==
South African academic Zoë Molver wrote that Make a Skyf, Man! "offers a singular take on the Struggle because it entertains the reader rather than attempting to explain or persuade." Michiel Heyns described the language of the book as a "pot-pourri of slang, obscenity and invective, interspersed with passages of pure lyricism".
