= Jean Middleton =

- Born: 30 August 1928; Durban, South Africa
- Died: 14 December 2010 (aged 82); United Kingdom
- Citizenship: South African
- Occupations: Teacher, activist, writer
- Organization(s): Congress of Democrats; South African Communist Party
- Known for: Anti-apartheid activism
- Notable work: Convictions: A Woman Political Prisoner Remembers (1998)
- Spouse: Harold Strachan

Jean Middleton (30 August 1928 – 14 December 2010) was an anti-apartheid activist in South Africa. She was born in Durban and trained as a teacher. She was married to Harold Strachan. Middleton moved to Johannesburg and became active in the Congress of Democrats and then the South African Communist Party. She helped Nelson Mandela by letting him use her flat. She was imprisoned, held in solitary confinement and then restricted from working or associating with others. Middleton moved to the United Kingdom and taught English in London. In 1991 she returned to South Africa where she edited Umsebenzi. In 1998 her book, Convictions: a woman political prisoner remembers was published. Late in life she suffered from emphysema and returned to Britain.

== Later life and legacy ==
Following her return to Britain, Jean Middleton lived a relatively quiet life while continuing to reflect on her experiences as an anti-apartheid activist. Her memoir remains an important personal account of political imprisonment under apartheid, offering insight into the role of women in the liberation struggle.

== Death ==
Middleton died on 14 December 2010 in the United Kingdom. She is remembered for her contribution to the anti-apartheid movement and her support for fellow activists during a critical period in South Africa’s history.
