= National Union of South African Students =

National Union of South African Students (NUSAS)
- Founded: 1924
- Dissolved: 2 July 1991
- Ideology: liberalism and radicalism

The National Union of South African Students (NUSAS) was an important force for liberalism and later radicalism in South African student anti-apartheid politics. Its mottos included non-racialism and non-sexism.

== Early history ==
NUSAS was founded in 1924 under the guidance of Leo Marquard, at a conference at Grey College by members of the Student Representative Councils (SRC) of South African Universities. The union was made up mostly of students from nine white English-language as well as Afrikaans South African universities. Its aim was to advance the common interests of students and build unity amongst English and Afrikaans students. Black membership was considered in 1933 when the University of Fort Hare was proposed but rejected. Afrikaans-speaking leaders walked out between 1933 with the Stellenbosch University leaders leaving in 1936. In 1945 the students from "native college" at University of Fort Hare were admitted as members confirming the commitment to non-racialism after a period of indecision.

Early presidents of the organisation included Phillip Tobias elected in 1948, who presided over the organisation's first anti-apartheid campaign. The effort was mounted to resist the racial segregation of South African universities. Ian Robertson, president in 1966, invited Senator Robert F. Kennedy to address South African Students. Other presidents included, John Didcott, Neville Rubin, Adrian Leftwich, Jonty Driver, Margaret H. Marshall, John Daniel, Paul Pretorius, Charles Nupen, Neville Curtis, Andrew Boraine, and Auret van Heerden. Several leaders of the organization were arrested, imprisoned, deported, or banned.

Though the organisation stood for non-violence in its opposition to Apartheid, some former senior members were associated with the first violent anti-apartheid resistance group, the African Resistance Movement.

Despite its liberal resistance to racially separate organisations in the 1960s, its members, and in particular its leadership, supported the breakaway in 1969, of black student leaders, led by Steve Biko and others, to form the South African Students' Organisation (SASO), a Black Consciousness Movement student grouping.

== Turn to radical apartheid opposition politics ==
The SASO break-away instigated a re-examination of NUSAS' political ideology and its role in the struggle against apartheid. In the early 1970s, NUSAS increasingly became informed by Western Marxist ideas. It turned to organising workers through its Student Wages Commission programme with an initial mandate to run an "investigation into the wages and working conditions of unskilled black university staff" and later to begin organising workers into trade unions. This work is argued to have sparked the emergence of black trade unionism in South Africa that went on to play a seminal role in opposition to apartheid in the 1980s.

Throughout this time many students at so-called "white" universities who supported the organisation because of its anti-apartheid campaigns. Most of the English language universities (Witwatersrand, University of Cape Town (UCT), Rhodes and University of Natal) remained affiliated to NUSAS, which by the mid-1970s was the strongest body of white resistance to apartheid.

NUSAS backed the African National Congress (ANC) in their campaign against repression, and adopted the Freedom Charter and involved its members in non-racial political projects in education, the arts and trade union spheres. This confronted Apartheid on the streets and in both the local and international media, infuriating the Nationalist Party Government who cracked down on the rising student revolt on several fronts in the mid-1970s.

By the early 1990s South African students began to see the need to consolidate their efforts to finally rid South Africa of racist controls and to re-focus on education issues. NUSAS was merged with black controlled student movements into a single non-racial progressive student organization, the South African Student Congress (SASCO), in 1991.

On 2 July 1991, NUSAS dissolved with the conclusion of its 67th congress.

== The NUSAS trial ==
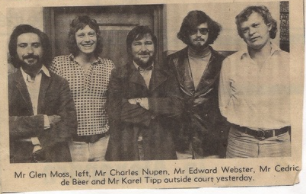
The five accused in the NUSAS Trial

In 1975, senior NUSAS leaders were arrested under s6 of the Terrorism Act and charged under the Suppression of Communism and Unlawful Organisations Acts. The five accused were Glenn Moss, Charles Nupen, Eddie Webster (a lecturer at Wits University), Cedric de Beer and Karel Tip. The charges related to a series of political campaigns run by NUSAS, including the 1974 campaign to release all political prisoners, a campaign on the history of opposition politics, the Wages Commissions, as well as support for Black Consciousness and the Freedom Charter. The state alleged that the five accused had entered into a conspiracy to further the objectives of communism and aims of the African National Congress and South African Communist Party.

The prosecution relied on the testimony from Bartholomew Hlapane, a former ANC and Communist Party member who had turned state witness. It was unclear why he was called so the defence team, led by Arthur Chaskalson, applied for permission to consult with three ANC leaders serving sentences on Robben Island, Nelson Mandela, Walter Sisulu, and Govan Mbeki. George Bizos, also on the defence team, met with the prisoners and learned not only that they knew about the trial but were willing to testify for the defence to rebut Hlapane's evidence. In the event, the defence team decided not to call the political prisoners to testify because it would raise the profile of the trial and risk the magistrate becoming hostile towards the accused.

In a verdict delivered over two days in December 1976 the five accused were found not guilty on the basis that the state had failed to establish a conspiracy.

== Notable alumni ==
- Phillip V. Tobias - president, 1948
- John Mowbray Didcott - president, 1955-1956
- Roger Jowell
- Steve Biko
- Neville Colman
- Margaret H. Marshall – president, 1967
- Duncan Innes – president, 1968
- Neville Curtis – president, 1969
- Andrew Boraine – president, 1980–1981
- Tony Karon
- Craig Williamson
