= Edgar Brookes =

South African politician

Edgar Harry Brookes (4 February 1897 – 22 April 1979) was a British-born South African Liberal senator and South African representative to the League of Nations. He initially supported apartheid but his views changed early in his political and academic career.

== Early life and education ==
Edgar Harry Brookes was born on 4 February 1897 in Smethwick, England in 1897. He attended Maritzburg College in Natal, South Africa, where he matriculated in 1911.

He attended the University of South Africa and the London School of Economics.

== Career ==
Some of Brookes' early works are noted for stressing the advantages of separate development of the races in South Africa, but it is noted that his views changed early in his career. He was involved with the South African Institute of Race Relations, a liberal institution, in the 1920s.

Brookes became a senator in 1937 and retired as the senator for Zululand in 1953.

Between 1933 and 1945 he was the principal of Adams College. He worked closely with John Dube to achieve common objectives. The school became one of the most important schools for black education. He was a professor of History and Political Science at the University of Natal.

When the Liberal Party was formed in 1953 he did not at first join it, but changed his mind when Peter Brown and other Liberals were detained in the 1960 State of Emergency, which was imposed after the Sharpeville massacre.

== Later life and death ==
After he retired from teaching at the University of Natal, Brookes was ordained as an Anglican priest.

He died on 22 April 1979 in Gillitts, KwaZulu-Natal.

== Works ==
- History of Native Policy in South Africa (1924)
- The Colour Problems of South Africa (1933)
- The Native Reserves of Natal (with N. Hurwitz) (1957)
- The City of God (1960)
- A History of Natal (1965). Co-authored with Colin Webb. A second edition with a new preface was published in 1987.
- A History of the University of Natal (1967)
- A South African Pilgrimage (1977)
