= Patrick Duncan (anti-apartheid activist) =

South African activist (1918–1967)

Patrick Baker Duncan (1918–1967) was a political thinker and activist, whose three books promoted human rights in South Africa and expressed concern regarding the relationship of humans with the Earth. An anti-apartheid activist, Duncan was a supporter of universal suffrage who was harassed and imprisoned by the Apartheid regime for his dissident activities.

== Early life ==
Born 1918 in Johannesburg, was the son of Sir Patrick Duncan. Duncan was educated first in South Africa and later in England, at Winchester College and at Balliol College, Oxford. In 1938 his friendship with a fellow Balliol student, Helmuth James Graf von Moltke, led to an invitation to stay with the von Moltke family in Germany: he thus came into contact with the anti-Nazi opposition group, the Kreisau Circle, and also spent three weeks in an Arbeitsdienst voluntary labour camp. Both experiences had a profound influence on him. In October 1939, having returned to South Africa, he travelled back to England hoping to join the army, but was rejected on medical grounds, because, since the age of 11, he had been lame, with a knee he couldn't bend due to an injury from a cricket ball that caused osteomyelitis.

He went on to join HM Diplomatic Service in Basutoland in 1941 where he served as an Assistant District Officer before becoming Private Secretary to the High Commissioner, Sir Evelyn Baring, in Cape Town in 1946. In 1947 he returned to Lesotho as Assistant District Officer and became Judicial Commissioner in 1951. His book, Sotho Laws and Customs, a handbook based on decided cases in Basutoland together with the Laws of Lerotholi, was published in Cape Town by Oxford University Press in 1960, and reprinted in 2006.

His Assessor, Chief Leabua Jonathan, in later years became Prime Minister of Lesotho. Duncan's approach to development in Africa was broad as well as original: he believed that soil erosion was a major issue of land management and published a pamphlet on this subject, entitled "The Enemy", in 1943 (Morija: Lesotho), under the pseudonym 'Melanchthon', Greek for 'black earth'.

== Political career ==
=== In South Africa ===
After the National Party won the 1948 General Election in South Africa, Duncan decided to involve himself directly in South African politics. Four factors were especially important in influencing this decision. First, he had developed a profound horror of racism. Secondly, he had become deeply influenced by the theories of the Mahatma Gandhi, particularly the concept of satyagraha. Thirdly, he had by then realised that for the African majority in South Africa the constitutional politics of the time were meaningless and hopeless. Fourthly, he always had an intense feeling of personal destiny, partly as the consequence of his father's career, which had culminated in his being Governor-General of the Union of South Africa.

After his resignation from the Colonial Service in 1952, Duncan and his family moved to a farm in the Orange Free State on the border with Basutoland. In November 1952 the ANC and the South African Indian Congress agreed to his participation in their defiance campaign. With Manilal, son of the Mahatma, Duncan led a procession into the African location in Germiston, where they and others were arrested. Duncan was sentenced to three months' imprisonment with hard labour, for breaking the law requiring whites to possess a permit before visiting a location; he served only two weeks, as ill health forced him to pay a fine in lieu of the remainder of his sentence. At this point he was working closely with the Congress movement, but soon considerable mutual distrust developed as a result of his suspicions that the ANC was being manipulated by members of the South African Communist Party, which had been secretly revived in 1953.

In 1955 Duncan joined the Liberal Party of South Africa, within which he was to become a radicalising influence, often evoking antipathy from its more conservative leaders. He worked as the National Organiser of the Liberal Party throughout 1956–57, although remained in close contact with the developing national movement in Basutoland and, in particular, with Chief Leabua Jonathan, whose BNP he helped found in late 1957 and early 1958.

In 1958 the Duncans moved to Cape Town where Patrick started the newspaper Contact, directed at a non-racial readership. Contact, a fortnightly tabloid, became a vehicle for his radicalism and his hostility to communism. The newspaper aroused resentment for its strong stance on various issues: for instance, it attacked Albert Luthuli, leader of the ANC (for allegedly allowing the ANC to be dominated by communists); it also advocated immediate universal adult franchise (which alarmed the more conservative members of the Liberal Party). Although, given the nature of its largely impoverished readership, Contact never achieved massive sales, it nevertheless had considerable impact, achieved partly by its identification with African nationalist movements throughout the continent. Duncan represented the Liberal Party at the All-African Peoples' Conference at Accra in 1958.

In 1959 he stood as the Liberal Party candidate in the Sea Point district of Cape Town for election to the Cape Provincial Council: in a forthright campaign, when asked if 'Natives and Coloureds' should be allowed to swim in the famous Sea Point swimming pools, he replied "Yes". The result of the 'swimming pool election' was a win by the United Party candidate with 4476 votes, against Duncan's 1505.

His sympathy for nationalism, as well as his feelings about communism, led Duncan to support the anti-pass campaign led by the Pan Africanist Congress (PAC) in 1960. In particular he played a crucial role in Cape Town during the negotiations between the PAC and the police after the march of 30,000 blacks from the townships into the city centre. The defeat of the campaign and the banning of the African political movements contributed to Duncan's growing disillusion with solely non-violent opposition to apartheid.

=== In exile ===
In March 1961, Duncan was served the first of his banning orders, which tried to curtail his political activities and his movements round the country. During 1960 and 1961, reports in Contact on the Communist Party had attracted even more than usual attention from the security police, and in 1961 Duncan was arrested and imprisoned in Roeland Street police cells. Asked to disclose the sources of his information on the banned Communist party, he refused. After three weeks of continuing refusal, he was released but then charged with publishing 'subversive literature'; Duncan refused to plead and wrote his own speech in defence of his actions, later published in Blom-Cooper's anthology, The Law as Literature (London: Bodley Head 1961). In March 1962 he was served another banning order which restricted him to the magisterial district of Cape Town. Defying this order, Duncan drove overnight to the Free State in a car with a false number plate, and was driven in the boot of a friend's car over the border into Basutoland, where he set up as a trader in two remote stores in the Quthing District, planning to use these as a base for further political activity in South Africa.

In early 1963 he resigned from the Liberal Party and joined the PAC, the first white man to be accepted into its ranks. After corresponding with Robert F. Kennedy, Duncan visited America as a representative of the PAC to try to affect US policy on South Africa; he was still, at this stage, still very pro-American, and he received some encouragement from members of the Kennedy administration. In July 1963 he addressed the UN Special Committee on Apartheid. However, while Duncan and his family were visiting England, the Resident Commissioner of Basutoland declared him a prohibited immigrant in that country. Duncan continued to work in the PAC and, in 1964, was sent to investigate financial malpractices at the PAC office in Dar es Salaam.

In the same year, he published South Africa’s Rule of Violence, an analysis of the violent repression of political protest in the country. He was appointed PAC representative for the North African countries, based in Algeria, where military training was being provided for PAC recruits: his ability to speak French stood him in good stead. However, in 1965 he was dismissed from his post: the reasons given included the fact that he had sent a personal letter congratulating his old friend and colleague, Chief Leabua Jonathan, on winning the Lesotho general election (the PAC was allied to Leabua's opponents, the BCP); and that, without waiting for an accord from Headquarters, he had recognised the new Government of Algeria formed by Houari Boumedienne after his coup d’état in 1965. However, Duncan remained a PAC member, and he took the decision to stay in Algeria, where he found work within a relief organisation, Comité Chrétien de Service en Algerie, part of the World Council of Churches.

During the years 1964-7 he deepened the ideas he had first expressed in The Enemy in 1943 about the effect of humans on what is now called 'biodiversity', and wrote Man and the Earth (published posthumously in 1975.). This analysis of the way people exploit the planet had a breadth which was exceptional at the time, and covered detailed issues in politics, history and science. He propounded an ethical system which he called 'Geism', 'a new morality based on the totality of the planet'. Though such ideas on what is now called sustainable development were beginning then to be familiar when applied at a local level (see for instance the ‘hima’ concept in Arabia), Duncan's special contribution was his call for a response, at a global level, to environmental challenges, within a broad ethical, philosophical and spiritual perspective. This scholarly work is remarkable since it proposes an approach to dealing with the challenges at a prescient date (the mid-1960s), and at a time when Duncan might have been preoccupied with the more immediate struggle against apartheid.

== Personal life ==
Married to Cynthia Ashley Cooper (later Lady Bryan) in 1947, with whom he had two sons and two daughters. He also had two sons with Gerda Joeckel.

While working for the relief organisation in Algeria, Duncan contracted a blood disease, aplastic anaemia and died in London, in 1967.

== See also ==
- List of people subject to banning orders under apartheid

== Notes and references ==
- Duncan, Patrick; Basutoland. Laws, statutes (2006). Sotho laws and custom. Morija, Lesotho: Morija Museum Archives. ISBN 978-99911-794-0-7.
- Duncan, Patrick. Patrick Duncan, South Africa's Rule of Violence. ISBN 0-416-27630-X.1964. London: Methuen, 169 pp.
- Duncan, Patrick (1975). Man and the Earth. Peterhead, Aberdeenshire: Volturna Press. p. 232.
- Driver, C. J. (2000). Patrick Duncan: South African and Pan-African. James Currey Publishers. ISBN 978-0-85255-773-0.
- Hochschild, Adam (1997). Finding the trapdoor: essays, portraits, travels. Syracuse: Syracuse University Press. ISBN 0-8156-0447-5.
- Lissoni, Arianna (2008). The South African liberation movements in exile, c. 1945-1970 (PDF) (PhD). School of Oriental and African Studies, University of London.
