= Selby Mvusi =

South African artist

Selby Mvusi (1929–1967) was a South African artist. He was born in Richmond, KwaZulu-Natal, on 18 June 1929. In 1961 he took a post at Clarke College, Atlanta, Georgia. He died in a car crash near Nairobi, Kenya, on 10 December 1967. In 2015 Elza Miles wrote a biography of Mvusi, called Selby Mvusi: To Fly with the North Bird South.

== Early life ==
His parents were Vunina (Nxasane) Mvusi and Jotham Mvusi. His father came from a farming family. Mvusi graduated from Fort Hare University with a theology degree in 1935. Mvusi and his family moved to Alice in the Eastern Cape when his father was appointed as the Secretary General of the Students Christian Movement at the University of Fort Hare.

== Education ==
Selby and his sister went to school at the Lovedale Presbyterian Church Primary School when they lived in the Eastern Cape. The Mvusi family returned to KwaZulu-Natal when his father started working as a senior minister at the Methodist Church in Durban. Mvusi finished his primary education in Ndaleni in the Natal Midlands. He completed his high school education in 1948 at Adams College near Amazimtoti in Natal. In 1949, he followed in his father's footsteps by attending the University of Fort Hare, the only university in South Africa which was open to Indian, Coloured and Black South Africans. His university career exposed him to the African National Congress Youth League (ANCYL), which he joined. He was elected into the Students Representative Council (SRC) of Fort Hare and participated in many other student organizations.

Mvusi developed his interest in fine art at Fort Hare. Although Fort Hare did not have a department of Fine Arts, it hosted a short course on graphic art run by an English professor and accomplished artist, Professor Donald Stuart. Mvusi worked with Harold Strachan in the 1950s. The Professor went on regular weekend sketching tours with Selby and other students in areas such as Alice and the Hogsback. The artist, Peter Clarke, noted that the time Selby spent with Stuart was instrumental in sparking Shelby's interest in art. Selby completed a further University Education Diploma at Rhodes University in Grahamstown. A year later he registered for a teaching course in arts in the newly formed Ndaleni Teachers Training College. This was the only arts college available for Black South Africans at the time under apartheid. He often made memorable posters for dances and "rags".

Selby was largely apolitical and showed little interest in political activities even though the university was filled with many boycotts, sit-ins and strikes.

== Death ==
Mvusi died in a car crash near Nairobi, Kenya, on 10 December 1967.

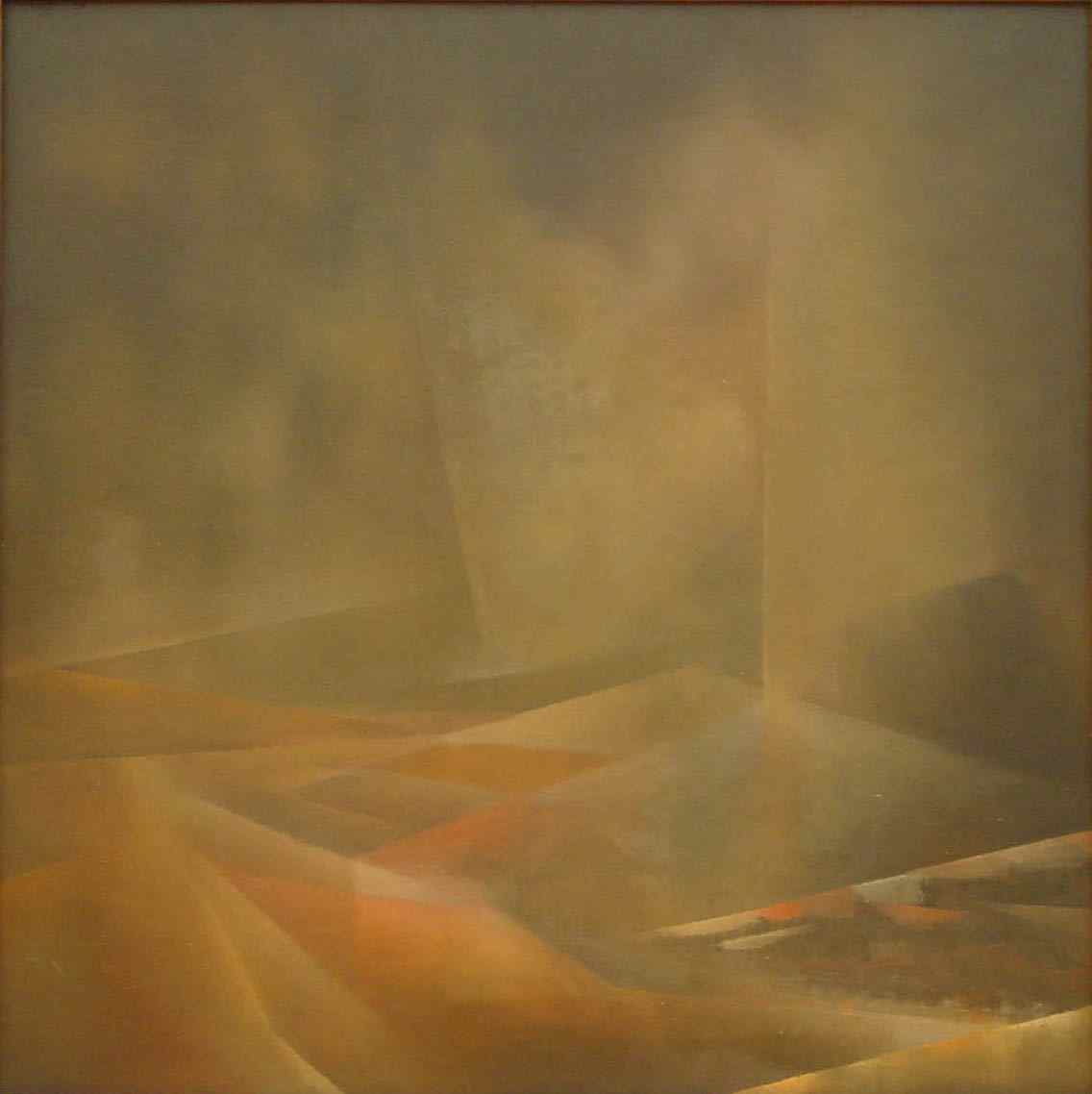
Oil painting by Selby Mvusi of Zululand

== See also ==
- Lionel Ngakane
- Sam Nolutshungu
