= Leslie Rubin =

South African politician (1909–2002)

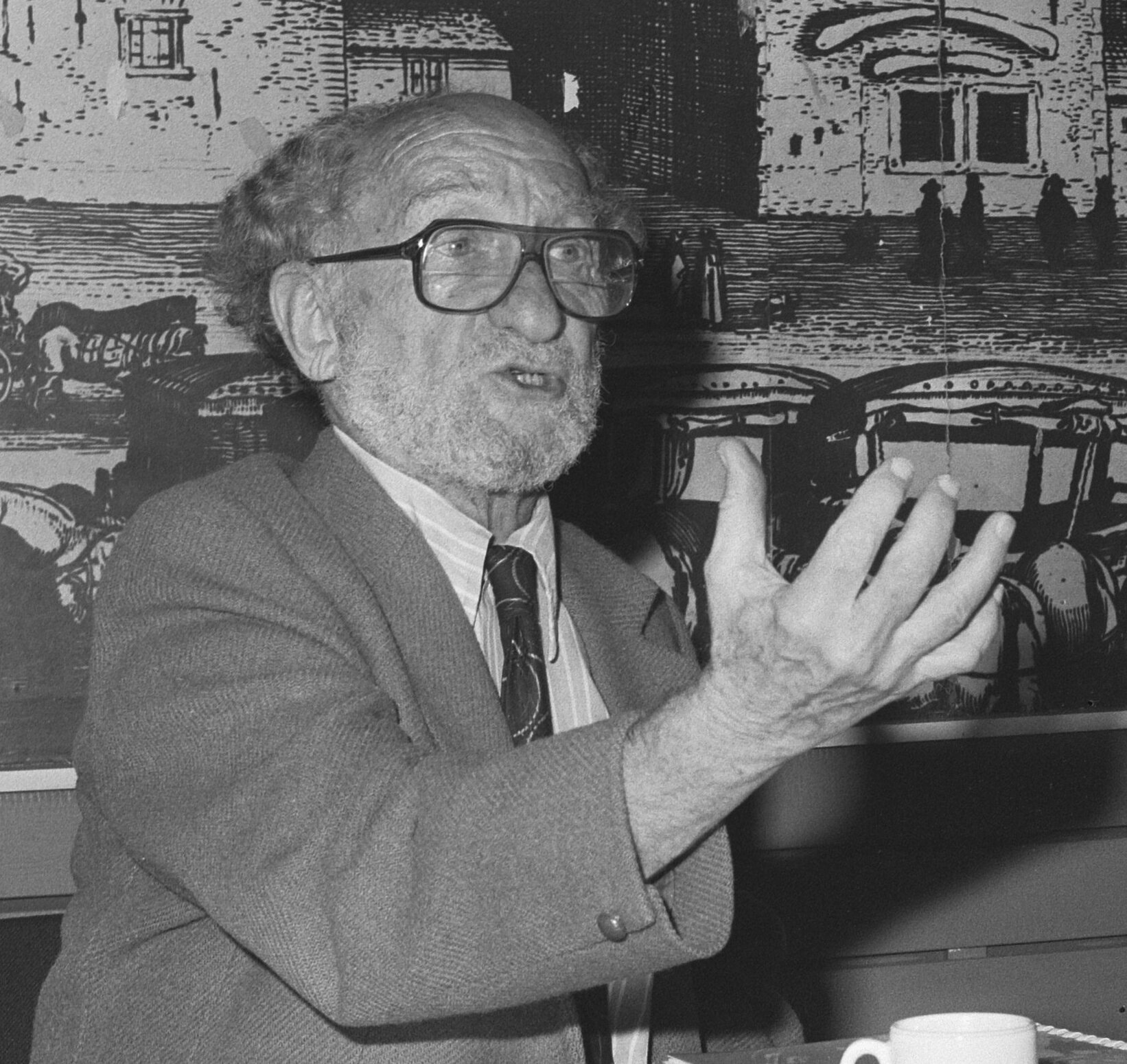
- Press conference some writers of "Apartheid Made in Europe" in The Hague, 1986

Senate of South Africa
- In office 1954–1960

Personal details
- Born: 5 August 1909 Cape Town, Cape Colony
- Died: 28 March 2002 (aged 92)
- Party: Liberal Party
- Other political affiliations: United Party
- Children: Neville Rubin
- Education: Durban High School
- Alma mater: University of the Witwatersrand
- Occupation: Lawyer

Military service
- Allegiance: Union of South Africa
- Branch/service: intelligence corps
- Years of service: 1940–1945
- Rank: Lieutenant
- Battles/wars: North African campaign Italian campaign

Leslie Rubin (5 August 1909 – 28 March 2002) was a South African senator and in 1953 one of the founding members of the Liberal Party, when prominent members of the United Party left the party in protest against the party's lack of vision regarding a racial policy. He was elected vice-chairman.

== Early career ==
The son of a rabbi, Rubin was born in District Six, Cape Town. He was educated at Durban High School and the University of the Witwatersrand.

He began his legal practice in Durban, after joining the South African army in 1940, he was commissioned in the intelligence corps in north Africa, and later attached to the RAF in Italy.

== Political activities ==
After the war, he settled in Cape Town and joined the War Veterans' Torch Commando, an organisation established to oppose the Nationalist government's plan to remove coloured voters from the common roll.

Rubin became chairman of the Liberal Party in the Cape in 1954, was elected to the senate. He resigned from the senate in 1960, before the native representatives' seats were abolished.

== Exile ==
In 1960 went into exile. He first went to Ghana, where he was director of the Centre for African Law at the University of Ghana. He became chairman of the United States committee of the International Defence and Aid Fund, getting funds to South Africa to support political prisoners and their families.

== See also ==
- Torch Commando
- Liberal Party of South Africa
