= Way Up, Way Out =

1998 book by Harold Strachan

Way Up, Way Out: A Satirical Novel
- Author: Harold Strachan
- Language: English
- Genre: Autobiographical novel
- Publisher: David Philip
- Publication date: 3 July 1998
- Publication place: South Africa
- Media type: Print (hardback & paperback)
- Pages: 176
- ISBN: 978-0-86486-355-3
- Followed by: Make a Skyf, Man!

Way Up, Way Out is the first book by the South African anti-apartheid activist Harold Strachan. It was first published by David Philip in Cape Town in 1998.

== Plot ==
The book, which is autobiographical fiction, describes the life of Jock Lundie (Strachan's nickname and middle name). The protagonist is born in Pretoria. As a young boy he is close to a German widow called Marthe Guldenpfennig. When his adoptive father dies, he moves with his mother and attends school in Pietermaritzburg. He enjoys the nurturing atmosphere and the arts and crafts in primary school. He keeps in touch with Guldenpfennig until she moves back to Darmstadt on the eve of the Second World War. When he goes to boarding school, he is able to avoid bullying by creative use of his artistic talents. With his best friend "Cheese" Kreis, he goes climbing in the Drakensberg mountains. After graduation he joins the South African Air Force near the end of the war. He learns to fly and to do aerobatics in the Tiger Moth, then does advanced bomber pilot training in the Airspeed Oxford. A Royal Air Force trainer called O'Dowd tells him that he was involved in the bombing of Darmstadt, where a firestorm was created and the entire city wiped out. Several of his friends, including "Cheese", are killed in flying accidents.

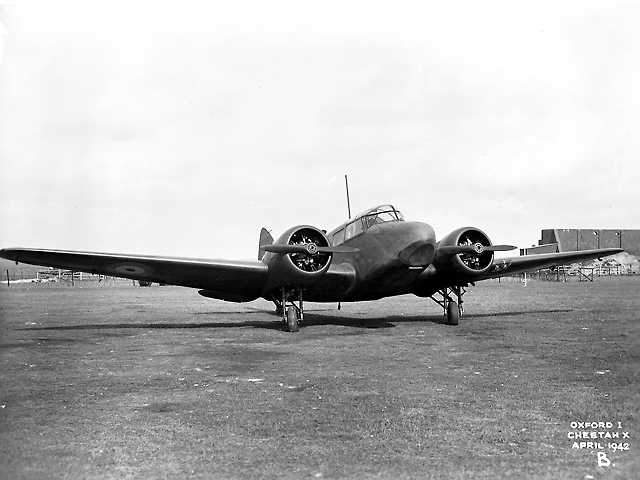
Airspeed Oxford

== Style ==
The book is loosely chronological but there are many diversions into South African history. It is written in South African English, with extensive use of Afrikaans phrases. The book is autobiographical fiction and was based on anecdotes he told. He has described how he tries to use the techniques of painting, such as contrast of texture, in his writing, and has expressed his admiration for the writing style of John Bunyan and Laurence Sterne, and the emotional authenticity of Thomas Hardy and Graham Greene.

== Background ==
Strachan wrote an early draft of the book very quickly after a friend persuaded him to start writing in his 70s. Strachan's original title was So It Goes, a reference to the anti-war book Slaughterhouse-Five by Kurt Vonnegut. He had intended the book to be an anti-war one: "I wanted it to be about four wars, ... because I'd known men from four imperial wars, you know – the Anglo-Zulu War, the Anglo-Boer War, World War 1, World War 2 – which I was in at the, at the gat kant". (Note: Afrikaans, "arse end")

He was disappointed with the edited version that was published. The South African academic Zoë Molver contends that the book was "bowdlerised" in the editing process, giving examples of how the original language was edited to adjust racial terms and much material relating to historical background was excised.

== Reception ==
The publisher, David Philip, described the book on its front cover as a "satirical novel". Dan Jacobson said in response, "While much of it is satirical in intention, as a whole it deserves a much grander designation. It is in fact a Bildungsroman, a novel describing the formation of a character or soul". He commented in the London Review of Books that Strachan had "seized eagerly on the expressive potentialities of South African English demotic speech ... in order to make something new and rare of it". He made a link between the protagonist's "call to arms" in the Second World War and the author's motivation in his involvement in the struggle against apartheid. David Evans said the publisher's description was inaccurate and that the book was the "first part of a semi-autobiographical trilogy". He also commented that "...the overall effect [is] rather like a multilayered painting, early touches being picked up later, the clever patterning only fully appreciated at the end". Sam Sole called Way Up, Way Out a "remarkable autobiography filled with rich and lunatic prose", and Athol Fugard described Strachan's "extraordinary gift for story telling which in my opinion makes him the rightful heir to the Herman Charles Bosman crown of our time". Jane Rosenthal wrote "Whether it is a memoir or a novel is interesting but irrelevant: it rings true".
