= Colin Webb (historian) =

South African historian, activist, and university administrator

Professor Colin de Berri Webb (1930–22 March 1992) was a South African historian, activist, and university administrator, who promoted the teaching of African history. He focused especially on Zulu history and the region of Natal.

== Early life ==
Born in Pretoria in 1930, Colin Webb attended Pretoria Boys High School. In 1948, on a Barclay's Bank Scholarship, he went to the University of the Witwatersrand, from which he subsequently graduated BA (Hons). In 1955 he went up to Clare College, Cambridge, as an Elsie Ballott scholar. His teachers at Cambridge included Geoffrey Elton. By 1957 he had completed his Cambridge degree, a 2:1 in the modern history tripos. (His degree was upgraded to MA status in 1963.) Webb also gained a teaching diploma from the University of Pretoria.

== Career ==
Webb began his teaching career at the University of Natal in Durban in 1957. In 1960, he was appointed lecturer there, in History and Political Science.

In 1961 or 1962, Webb was promoted to senior lecturer at the University of Natal in Pietermaritzburg. He was subsequently elevated to an associate professorship there, and became deputy dean of faculty. During his tenure at Pietermaritzburg, Webb promoted the research and teaching of African history, requesting that Honours students be permitted to take Zulu instead of French or German as their compulsory language course, and that they be allowed to focus their research projects on African topics instead of European or American ones. Webb also created a junior research assistantship in African History. In 1963–1964 Webb won a British Council bursary for research in Britain. In 1971, Webb introduced a new Honours level course on the history of African societies in Southern Africa. In 1973, Webb persuaded his colleague and former student John Wright to create an undergraduate course on the pre-history of Southern Africa.

In 1970, Webb, began to translate and edit the James Stuart Papers in collaboration with John Wright, one of Webb's former MA students who had recently been appointed lecturer. Webb and Wright's editions of these testimonies about indigenous societies in the Natal-Zululand region were published from 1976 onwards by the University of Natal Press.

In 1976, Webb took up the King George V Chair of History at the University of Cape Town (UCT), the most prominent South African chair in history. At UCT, he was also Dean of the Arts from 1981-1984.

In 1979, Webb was elected Fellow of the Royal Historical Society.

In 1984, Webb became Vice-Principal of the Durban branch of the University of Natal.

In January 1987 Webb was a signatory to the University of Natal's formal objection to arbitrary detention without charge, legal counsel or trial. This was occasioned by the detention of Jo Beall, lecturer in African Studies and secretary of the Joint Academic Staff Association, who had been arbitrarily detained since December 1986.

In 1988, Webb, together with Peter de V. Booysen and R. Hugh Philpott, visited Zimbabwe and Zambia to forge contacts with universities there.

From 1988 until February or March 1992, Webb was Vice-Principal of the Pietermaritzburg branch of the University of Natal. His return to Pietermaritzburg had been influenced by a petition from his former colleagues there, asking him to rejoin them by taking up that post. Webb was instrumental in founding, at Pietermaritzburg, the Alan Paton Centre for the Study of the Literature and Politics of Inter-group Conciliation, which he opened on 24 April 1989. While Vice-Principal at Pietermaritzburg, Webb oversaw the renovation of the Old Main Hall. The Vice-Principalship at Pietermaritzburg was demanding. Webb sometimes had to make three trips a day to Durban. In 1991, Webb met with student unionists from the Right to Learn campaign who demanded that the University "transform itself into an institution accessible to all". Webb agreed that, rather than be immediately excluded, students would henceforth be allowed to appeal poor examination results and be allowed to continue studying while awaiting conclusion of the appeal. Also in 1991, Principal James Leatt controversially overruled Webb and reinstated a pupil who had been excluded from the campus's William O’Brien Hall of residence. The stress of the job affected Webb's health, and he lost his sight in one eye - as had two of his colleagues, Deneys Schreiner and Peter de V. Booysen.

In addition to his primary academic posts, Webb also held a number of other positions. From 1977-1979 and 1981-1983 he was vice-president of the South African Historical Society, becoming president in 1983. Webb also participated in the Education Specialist Group of the Buthelezi Commission, chaired the Natal Education Board, and sat on the Academic Planning Committee of the Committee of University Principals.

=== Journal editorships ===
From 1962-75, Webb was co-editor of the journal Theoria, to which he returned as editorial adviser from 1978.

In 1971 Webb convinced the Natal Society to launch the scholarly journal Natalia, for dissemination of research on the Natal region. From the journal's inauguration until 1975, he chaired its editorial board, which initially included Pam Reid, John Clark and Sue Judd, plus June Farrer and Mr. R.A. Brown.

== Reception and legacy ==
Webb was known for his impressive height and humour. For a University of Natal at Durban rag week, student Michael Lambert wrote a variety script in the style of Gilbert and Sullivan that referenced Webb as a "giggling tall historian".

Former student John Laband recalled Webb as being one of the two best lecturers he ever encountered, who gave "finely argued lectures in thrilling, resonant tones that engaged our intellects and emotions." On 27 August 1992, the Old Main Hall - a central building at the Pietermaritzburg campus of the University of Natal - was renamed Colin Webb Hall in Webb's honour. Christopher Merrett indicated that a biography of Webb would be welcome.

Webb's critics included Shula Marks, who in 1967 described Brookes and Webb's A History of Natal as biased "towards the history of white settlement in Natal" and "cut off from the new thinking in their field". Stephen Gray indicated that A History of Natal contained internal contradictions, significant omissions, and Anglocentric bias.

Webb's colleague Colin Gardner, however, said that "Colin Webb as an historian was distinguished precisely by his capacity to understand and penetrate other viewpoints besides the colonial and European one, the one that had in general dominated the writing of our history until his time. His crucial pioneering work in South African history, particularly the history of Natal and Zululand, involved conjuring up the perspective of the victims of white aggression."

Gardner also noted that "As a lecturer and supervisor, a speaker at public meetings, and a person dedicated to the creation of social and political justice, [Webb] showed himself to be an intellectual and social leader. But this aspect of him expressed itself in many other ways. He found himself being elected to many committees, both within the universities that he served and in the larger society. Within the Arts Faculties of [the University of Natal] and of the University of Cape Town he moved to the top with a sort of naturalness or inevitability, for he wasn't in the normal sense of the word a particularly ambitious person. He simply believed that tasks were important and needed to be carried out intelligently and honestly; other people decided that he was the person to perform crucial functions."

== Selected works ==
- 1957. "The Great Illusion". Theoria II.
- 1965. Guide to the Official Records of the Colony of Natal. In 1984 an updated version was published, edited by Jennifer Verbeek, Mary Nathanson and Elaine Peel, as Webb’s Guide to the Official Records of the Colony of Natal.
- 1965. A History of Natal. Co-authored with Edgar Brookes. A second edition with a new preface was published in 1987.
- 1976-2014. James Stuart Archive of Recorded Oral Evidence Relating to the History of the Zulu and Neighbouring Peoples. Co-edited with John Wright.
- 1978. A Zulu King Speaks. Co-edited with John Wright. A second edition was published in 1987.
- 1990. Historical introduction and index to volume 1 of a new English translation of Adulphe Delegorgue's Travels in Southern Africa.

== Personal life ==
In 1954, Fleur Gower took up a temporary, part-time post at the University of Natal in Durban teaching introductory French. There, despite a warning from Elizabeth Sneddon against "lefties", she befriended Violaine Junod, Anthony de Crespigny, and Graham Neame - and later, in 1957, Webb. Webb and Gower married in 1960.

Colin and Fleur Webb kept a property in Isipingo that served as a safe house for political activists. Those sheltered included the Webbs' friends Alan and Dorrie Paton, and in 1960 during a wave of mass arrests of anti-apartheid figures, Violaine Junod sought refuge there. On one occasion, the Webbs transported a dissident to the safe haven of Lesotho. The Webbs were placed under surveillance by the police: their phone was tapped, and special branch detectives would regularly visit their home. In 1962, Fleur Webb joined the anti-apartheid group Black Sash, becoming a protest-stand organiser for the Natal Midlands branch through the 1960s and 1970s.

The Webbs's first son, Jonathan, was born in 1962. Another son, Nicholas, was born in 1964.

Colin Webb was an early member of the Progressive Party, which rejected racial discrimination and advocated equal opportunities for all with a qualified franchise with a common voter's roll. He served in the executive committee of the Natal branch.

In the 1970s, when Webb was a lecturer at the University of Natal's campus in Pietermaritzburg, Fleur Webb served as a patron on a bursary fund for the needy students of that campus.
