= Last Grave at Dimbaza =

- Directed by: Chris Curling director of photography Pascoe Macfarlane
- Produced by: Nana Mahomo, Antonia Caccia, Andrew Tsehiana
- Narrated by: Chris Curling
- Edited by: Chris Curling
- Production company: Morena Films
- Distributed by: Icarus Films
- Release date: 1974
- Running time: 55 minutes
- Country: UK
- Language: English

Last Grave at Dimbaza is a 1974 documentary film made by South African and young British film-makers who wanted to document Apartheid in South Africa. The same team had previously made the film End of the Dialogue. Because of South Africa's restrictive laws governing what could be photographed, the film had to be shot clandestinely and smuggled out of the country, where it was edited and released in England.

The film won the Grand Prix award for Short Film at the Melbourne International Film Festival in 1975.

The film highlighted the disparity in living conditions between white and black people in South Africa, revealing that this has been enshrined in numerous South African laws. While white people enjoyed one of the highest standards of living in the world, the lives of black people were carefully circumscribed so that they enjoyed few rights with no legal recourse. Most lived in poverty.

When the film was released, it resulted in international condemnation of the Apartheid government's brutal resettlement policy, which had not been widely known outside of South Africa prior to that point.

== Closing scene ==
The closing scene of the film was photographed in a black children's cemetery in the town Dimbaza. Because of the high mortality rate, the film shows graves that have already been dug in anticipation of the newly deceased. The final words of the narrator are:

"During the hour you've been watching this film, six black families have been thrown out of their homes, sixty blacks have been arrested under the pass laws, and sixty black children have died of the effects of malnutrition. And during the same hour, the gold mining companies have made a profit of £35,000."

== Additional credits ==
- Thanks toward contribution costs: Alec Horsley, Defence & Aid, James Johnson.
- Special thanks to Neville Colman and Glenys Lobban.
