= James Stuart (linguist) =

James Stuart (1868–1942) was a civil servant of the Colony of Natal and Zulu linguist; also a collector of Zulu oral tradition. He compiled five school readers containing Zulu poetry and narrative.

Webb's notes were posthumously edited and published by Colin Webb (historian) and John Wright.

== Works ==
- Stuart, James (1913). History of the Zulu Rebellion, 1906, and of Dinzulu's arrest, trial and expatriation. London: Macmillan and Co.
- — (1924). uBaxoxele (in Zulu). London: Longmans, Green and Co.
- — (1924). uHlangakhula (in Zulu). London: Longmans, Green and Co.
- — (1925). uKhulumethule (in Zulu). London: Longmans, Green and Co.
- — (1925). uThulasizwe (in Zulu). London: Longmans, Green and Co.
- — (1926). uVusezakithi (in Zulu). London: Longmans, Green and Co.

== Bibliography ==
- Andrzejewski, B. W.; Pilaszewicz, S.; Tyloch, W. (1985). Literatures in African Languages: Theoretical Issues and Sample Surveys. Cambridge University Press. p. 525. ISBN 978-0-521-25646-9.
- Hamilton, Carolyn (1 August 1994). James Stuart and "the establishment of a living source of tradition". University of Witwatersrand.
- Hamilton, Carolyn (1998). ""The establishment of a living source of tradition": James Stuart and the genius of Shakan despotism". Terrific majesty: The powers of Shaka Zulu and the limits of historical invention. Cambridge, Massachusetts and London, England: Harvard University Press. pp. 130–168.
