= Margaret Ballinger =

South African politician (1894–1980)

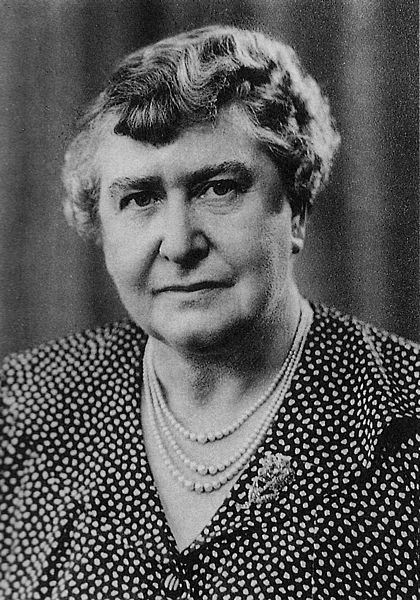
- Born: Violet Margaret Livingstone Hodgson; 1894; Glasgow, Scotland
- Died: 1980 (aged 85–86)
- Education: Somerville College, Oxford
- Known for: Politician
- Political party: Liberal Party of South Africa
- Spouse: William Ballinger

Margaret Ballinger (née Hodgson; 1894–1980) was the first President of the Liberal Party of South Africa and a South African Member of Parliament. In 1944, Ballinger was referred to as the "Queen of the Blacks" by Time magazine.

== Biography ==
Margaret Hodgson was born in Glasgow, Scotland in 1894 and moved to Cape Colony with her family when she was a child. Her father arrived just before the Boer War and ended up fighting against the British. Hodgson (Ballinger) attended the Huguenot College in Wellington before continuing her education in England. In England she went to Somerville College, Oxford.

She taught history when she returned to South Africa at Rhodes University in Grahamstown and University of the Witwatersrand. She stood for election where there were seven representatives for eight million black South Africans against the 140 M.P.s who represented the other 20% of the population. She had stood against other male candidates and talking through an interpreter had managed to win the electorate's confidence. It was said that she used the analogy of Joan of Arc to illustrate what a woman could do for them.

She represented the people of the Eastern Cape from 1937 on the Native Representatives Council (NRC). She was credited, along with Senator Edgar Brookes, for moving people from talking about controlling the native South African populace to finding out how their lives could be improved. In 1943 she was proposing new laws and in 1947 her plans included new training and municipal representation for "blacks" and improved consultation with the NRC. This period from 1937 through the 1950s is seen as when Ballinger had most power and influence. A Time Magazine report in 1944 named "Mrs Ballinger" as the "Queen of the Blacks". Her power as a speaker was only overshadowed by the prime ministers, Jan Smuts, and Jan Hofmeyr, his heir apparent. The future that the article foresaw for Ballinger was as the "white hope" leading 24,000,000 blacks as part of an expanded British influence in southern Africa. She overshadowed her husband, William, who some see as now out of his depth in the changing political outlook. They had both formed a Friends of Africa movement, but this looked more to Britain for funding than it did in its success in linking to the emerging African native political organisations.

When the Liberal Party of South Africa was formed in 1953 she was its first President. The party was founded around Alan Paton, who was one of the vice Presidents. She was one of the few people to speak against the apartheid views of Hendrik Frensch Verwoerd.

In 1960 she left Parliament when the South African government abolished the Parliamentary seats representing Africans. She was given a bronze award in 1961 by the British Royal African Society for her services to Africa. Her citation mentioned the links she had established between African and European women and for the home for sick children she established.

She left the party before it was wound up by its own membership in 1968. At that time it became illegal for a political party to have members from more than one race. The party preferred to die rather than choose.

== Works ==
- From Union to Apartheid - A Trek to Isolation, 1969

== Legacy ==
The home for sick children which she had established was closed down during the apartheid era, but it has taken new shapes. Ballinger had started three schools in Soweto without official permission, the first is named in her honour.
