= Andrew Boraine =

Economic and urban development expert

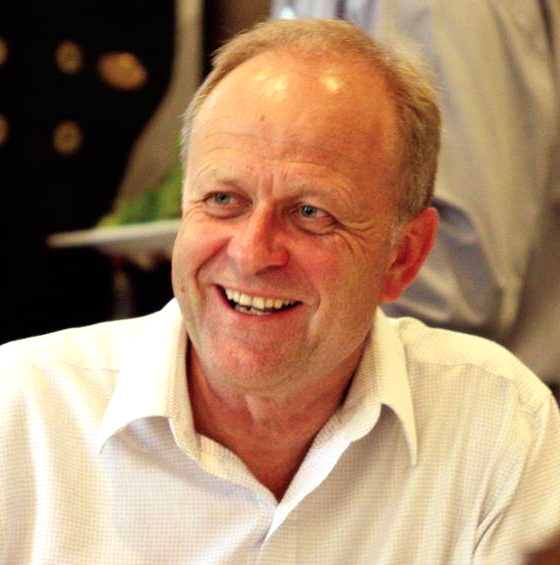
Andrew Boraine

Andrew Michael Boraine (born 18 February 1959) is an international expert on economic and urban development and partnering for systems change, who has worked in the development sector in South Africa for more than 41 years. He was a senior official in the constitutional department of Nelson Mandela’s government in the immediate post-Apartheid years, and was the first post-Apartheid City Manager of Cape Town. Boraine later founded the South African Cities Network and helped to establish the Cape Town Partnership, of which he was CEO for 10 years between 2003 and 2013. He is currently CEO of the Western Cape Economic Development Partnership (EDP). In 2017, Andrew participated in the Rockefeller Foundation Bellagio Center Residency Program where he researched "the role of partnering and partnerships in steering and managing complex societal transitions" in relation to city and regional development.

== Early life and education ==
Boraine was born in Pietermaritzburg, South Africa on 18 February 1959. He attended Kearsney College (1972–74) and Diocesan College (1975–76) before reading for bachelor's degrees in History and Economic History at the University of Cape Town.

Boraine was elected National President of NUSAS (the National Union of South African Students) in 1980 and 1981 and was a committed anti-Apartheid activist throughout his student years and until the end of the regime in 1994. In 1983, he was a founding member of the United Democratic Front (UDF), a large popular movement in South Africa during the 1980s against Apartheid. He was detained without trial several times and placed under house arrest by the Apartheid government. In the late 80s and early 90s, Boraine became involved with Planact, an NGO which provided advisory services to civic organisations. He acted as a facilitator in their negotiations with local government, particularly looking to build capacity amongst the most marginalised and disadvantaged communities.

== Early career ==
When South Africa’s first democratic government was established in 1994 under the leadership of Nelson Mandela, Boraine was appointed Deputy Director-General in the Department of Constitutional Development. Boraine was responsible for the amalgamation of South Africa’s local authorities to form integrated (i.e. non-racially segregated) authorities, and assisted in drafting the local government chapter for the new South African Constitution, which adopted an innovative definition of local government as an equal, rather than subordinate, sphere of government to national and provincial governments.

In 1997, Boraine moved from national government to take up the position of City Manager of the City of Cape Town. The role required Boraine to restructure the city administration and address the needs of populations and areas which had been excluded from the local government system for many years under Apartheid. In 2001, Boraine became Special Advisor to the Minister for Cooperative Governance and Traditional Affairs, where he advised on city development strategy and urban policy. Boraine used his experiences as Cape Town City Manager to conceptualise and coordinate the establishment of the South African Network (SACN), which encourages the nine largest cities in South Africa to exchange information, experience and best practices on urban development and city management.

== Cape Town Partnership and Western Cape Economic Development Partnership ==
In 2003, Boraine joined the Cape Town Partnership (CTP) – an institution which he had helped to establish during his time as City Manager. The Partnership, which operated for 17 years, was a non-profit collaborative organisation in which public, private and civic sectors worked together to develop, promote and manage Cape Town Central City. The Partnership developed a vision of an “inclusive, productive and diverse city centre that retains its historic character and reflects a common identity for all the people of Cape Town”. Its initial role was to bring the private and the public sectors together to find workable solutions to create a safe, clean and high-quality environment in Cape Town’s Central City in which to work, play, study and live. A specific urban management vehicle, the Central City Improvement District (CCID) was launched in November 2000 to implement the CTP’s plans on the ground.

Within a decade of the Cape Town Partnership’s establishment the Cape Town Central City had become one of the cleanest and safest in the country. Crime dropped by 50%, serious crime by 90%, and today 74% of people say they feel safe in the CBD. The CTP developed an internationally recognised social development programme, innovative job creation schemes, attracted investment of between R14-18bn with a further R20bn in the pipeline, upgraded and redeveloped over 170 buildings, many of them of important heritage significance, restored property values and municipal revenues, revitalised public spaces and improved pedestrian environments, fostered innovative cultural, sustainable development and 2010 FIFA World Cup programmes, and developed an agenda for the future in the form of the Central City Development Strategy.

As CEO of the CTP, Boraine led Cape Town’s successful bid for the title of World Design Capital 2014. The CTP sourced and developed content for the bid ‘book’, prepared supporting material to strengthen the case, and hosted the judges in the city for a three-day site inspection in mid 2011. Cape Town was announced as the 2014 World Design Capital in October 2011, beating the shortlisted cities of Bilbao and Dublin to the title.

Boraine was CEO of the CTP for nearly 10 years, stepping down in April 2013 to focus his efforts on the wider Cape Town and Western Cape region, through his formation and leadership of the Western Cape Economic Development Partnership (EDP).

The Western Cape Economic Development Partnership, known as the EDP, was established in April 2012 to improve the performance of the Cape Town and Western Cape socio-economic development system. It helps leaders and institutions from different sectors - public, private, civil society, education and research - to work together, to grow the local, metropolitan and regional economy, and to address complex system challenges.

Formally, the EDP was set up to “improve the performance of the Cape Town and Western Cape economic development system, by creating and sustaining partnerships between economic stakeholders, in support of the goal of creating a resilient, inclusive and competitive region, thus contributing to South Africa’s national economic success.”

== International career ==
Boraine has become an international thought leader in city, economic and urban development strategy – he has spoken at the World Urban Forum, the Brisbane G20 Global Cafe, the UK Sustainable Cities Summit and Chatham House. He has also presented at international conferences of the Urban Age Project Urban Age, the International Urban Development Association (INTA), the Cities Alliance, the Brookings Global City Initiative, the International Downtown Association (IDA), the International Federation for Housing and Planning, World Bank, OECD, United Nations, and USAID amongst others. Boraine has also advised the UK’s Improvement and Development Agency for Local Government and participated in the OECD’s LEED Programme Urban Missions to the cities of Belfast, Derry and Barcelona. In 2019, Boraine presented a series of talks on ‘Partnering and Partnerships for Developing Cities: Lessons from South Africa’ in Bangaluru, Hyderabad and Delhi, India, as a guest of Janaagraha Centre for Citizenship and Democracy.

== Personal life ==
Boraine is married with two children, and lives in Cape Town. His father was the former South African politician and former Deputy Chairperson of South Africa's Truth and Reconciliation Commission Alex Boraine.

== Current roles ==
Boraine's current positions are:

- CEO of the Western Cape Economic Development Partnership
- Adjunct professor with the African Centre for Cities at the University of Cape Town
- Associate professor, Centre for Complex Systems in Transition, Stellenbosch University
- Partnering practitioner associate, South African Cities Network (SACN)
- Nonresident senior fellow in the Brookings Metropolitan Policy Program

Boraine is a former chair of the board of the Cape Town International Convention Centre (CTICC). Boraine was also a board member of the Development Bank of South Africa (DBSA) until June 2014, when he stepped down after nine years. During his time on the board of the DBSA, Boraine chaired the bank's development planning committee.
