= Jonty Driver =

South African activist (1939–2023)

- Born: Charles Jonathan Driver; 19 August 1939; Cape Town, South Africa
- Died: 21 May 2023 (aged 83); Bristol, England
- Education: St. Andrew's College: University of Cape Town; Trinity College, Oxford (M.Phil)
- Occupations: Anti-apartheid activist; former political prisoner; educationalist; poet; writer
- Website: jontydriver.co.uk

Charles Jonathan Driver (19 August 1939 – 21 May 2023), usually known as Jonty Driver, was a South African anti-apartheid activist, political prisoner, educationalist, poet and writer.

== Early life ==
Charles Jonathan Driver was born in Cape Town, South Africa, in 1939 but spent the years of the Second World War in Kroonstad and Cradock with his mother and younger brother and his grandfather, who was the rector of the Anglican parish there. During this period, Driver's father did wartime service in North Africa, and was captured by the Axis forces at Tobruk, spending the rest of the war as a prisoner of war in Italy and Germany. When he came back to South Africa, the family moved to Grahamstown in the Eastern Cape, where his father was appointed chaplain at St. Andrew's College and where Jonty later did his schooling.

== Student days ==
Driver did his undergraduate study at the University of Cape Town (UCT). He was elected president of the National Union of South African Students in 1963 and again in 1964. In August and September 1964, he was detained without trial by the police and held in solitary confinement for five weeks under the 90-day Detention Law, possibly because of his suspected involvement in the African Resistance Movement. On his release he immediately left for England. He went to Trinity College, Oxford, to study for an M.Phil.

While he was at Oxford, the South African authorities refused to renew his passport and he became stateless for several years, eventually becoming a British citizen. For more than twenty years, he was prohibited from returning to South Africa.

== Work in education ==
After his time at Oxford, Driver taught at Sevenoaks School in Kent and then at Matthew Humberstone Comprehensive School in Lincolnshire (formerly Humberside) after 1973, where he was Director of Sixth-Form Studies. He wrote Patrick Duncan: South African and Pan-African while on a sabbatical from the school in 1976 and before taking up his next appointment.

In 1976, he was a Research Fellow at the University of York, and for 23 years, he was a headmaster (Principal, Island School, Hong Kong, 1978–83; Headmaster, Berkhamsted School, 1983–9; Master, Wellington College, 1989–2000).

== Writing career ==
As of November 2019, Driver was a full-time writer, though he continued his involvement in education. Throughout his career, he published 10 books of poems (most recently Still Further: New Poems), five poetry booklets (the most recent one, A Winter’s Day at Westonbirt), five novels, five biographies and memoirs, and a book of verse for children.

Driver was, as of November 2019, an honorary senior lecturer at the School of Literature and Creative Writing, University of East Anglia, a post he held since 2007.

Driver was a judge for the Caine Prize for African Writing, 2007 and 2008. He was a fellow of the Bogliasco Foundation in 2007. He was a fellow at the MacDowell Colony in New Hampshire, USA, in the fall of 2009, and a fellow at the Hawthornden Writers' Retreat in March/April 2011.

== Personal life and death ==
Jonty Driver was married, with three children and eight grandchildren. He died on 21 May 2023, at the age of 83.

== Selected works ==
- History of the Relations Between NUSAS, the ASB and the Afrikaans University Centres: Covering the Period 1960–1963. Supplement. National Union of South African Students. 1964. with Adrian Leftwich
- Jack Cope. D. Philip. 1979. ISBN 978-0-908396-11-5.
- Patrick Duncan: South African and Pan-African. Heinemann. 1980. ISBN 978-0-435-96200-5.
  - Patrick Duncan: South African and Pan-African (Paperback ed.). James Currey. 2000. ISBN 9780852557730.
- Elegy for a Revolutionary. David Philip. 1984. ISBN 978-0-86486-015-6.
- Hong Kong Portraits. Perpetua Press. 1986. ISBN 978-0-9511667-0-3.
- "Used to be Great Friends". Granta: 7–26. 2002.
- So Far: Selected Poems, 1960–2004. Snailpress. 2005. ISBN 978-1-904724-27-8.
- A Messiah of the Last Days. Faber & Faber. 2010. ISBN 978-0-571-27000-2.
- Death of Fathers. Faber & Faber. 2011. ISBN 978-0-571-26050-8.
- Send War in Our Time, O Lord. Faber & Faber. 2011. ISBN 978-0-571-25965-6.
- The Man with the Suitcase: The Life, Execution and Rehabilitation of John Harris, Liberal Terrorist. Cape Town: Crane River. 2015. ISBN 9780620668521.
- "Alan Paton's Hofmeyr". Race & Class. 6 (4): 269–280. 1965. doi:10.1177/030639686500600403. ISSN 0306-3968. S2CID 143844131.
- "Rhodes? The swine did some good". Rand Daily Mail. 20 March 2015.
- Some Schools. John Catt Educational. 30 November 2016. ISBN 9781909717978. (About the five schools at which Driver worked)
- Before. Crane River in association with the Africa Sun Press. August 2018. ISBN 9781874915324. (A collection of 22 poems)
