= End of the Dialogue =

End of the Dialogue (Phelandaba)
- Directed by: Antonia Caccia, Simon Louvish
- Produced by: Nana Mahomo, Vusumzi Make, Rakhetla Andrew Tsehlana
- Production company: Morena Films
- Distributed by: Contemporary Films (UK)
- Release date: 1970
- Running time: 44 minutes
- Country: South Africa
- Language: English

End of the Dialogue (Phelandaba) , also known as A Black View of South Africa, is a 1970 documentary film made by five black South African expatriate members of the Pan-Africanist Congress and London film students who wanted to document Apartheid in South Africa. Because of South Africa's restrictive laws governing what could be photographed, the film had to be shot clandestinely and smuggled out of the country. It was edited and released in England.
The film caused an uproar when it was originally released in 1970. It was released worldwide and also screened on television in many countries, including the U.S. (as a CBS special), U.K. (on Man Alive), and New Zealand. The film is valuable as not only a record of history, but also a record of how little the outside world understood about what was happening in apartheid South Africa. The London Observer called it, "the most successful act of clandestine subversion against apartheid for years." The same team went on to make Last Grave at Dimbaza.

== Awards ==
1970 Catholic Film Workers Prize
Golden Dove Award, 1970 Leipzig Film Festival (Germany)
Golden Squirrel Award, Netherlands Film Institute
Inter-Film Jury Prize and the Volkshoch-Schule Jury Prize, 1970 Oberhausen Film Festival (Germany)
1970 Moscow Film Festival
1971 Emmy Award, Outstanding Achievement by Individuals in Cultural Documentary Programs - Narrator (Nano Mahomo)
2003 African Studies Association Conference Film Festival
