= Peter Brown (South African politician) =

South African Liberal Party leader and activist

National Chairman of the Liberal Party
- In office 1958–1968
- Preceded by: Alan Paton

Personal details
- Born: 24 December 1924 Durban, South Africa
- Died: 8 June 2004 (aged 79) Pietermaritzburg, South Africa
- Party: Liberal Party

Peter McKenzie Brown (24 December 1924 – 2004) was a founding member of the Liberal Party of South Africa and succeeded Alan Paton as its national chairman in 1958.

== Biography ==
Brown was born in Durban on 24 December 1924 to a wealthy family of Scottish decent with a shipping fortune. When he was seven, his father was killed during a polo game. Despite this, young Peter became a keen polo player, later clandestinely playing polo outside the restriction zone of his 1960s banning order. He was educated privately at Michaelhouse, where he excelled. He joined the army at 17 and served in Egypt and then in Italy. Following World War II he began studies in agriculture at Cambridge, which he left in his first year after being inspired by South African writer Peter Abrahams to return home. Back in South Africa, he studied African languages, becoming fluent in Zulu, and Native Law and Administration at the University of Cape Town. In the 1950s the Local Health Commission in Pietermaritzburg employed Brown. Here he helped start the Edendale YMCA and KwaHlenga Bantu (Edendale Cripple Care).

The Liberal Party (LP) was established in 1953, with Brown playing an important role. He was the founder of the party in Natal, and became LP Natal Provincial Secretary in 1954. The Liberal Party was politically significant, being at that time only the second South African political party to be launched by people of all races (the SACP predating this). In 1956 he became deputy to the LP National Chairperson, Alan Paton. In his role as National Chairman in 1958, Brown stood for Parliament. Following Paton’s writing of ‘The Long View’ in the liberal journal Contact (reflecting LP and some non-racial thinking), in 1958 Brown took over writing the column. He continued to write for the publication until his banning in 1964. In the early hours of 29 March 1960, 10 days after the Sharpeville massacre, police raided the homes of leading LP members and arrested 20 people, including Brown. He was detained for 98 days but released without charge. In 1961 he became organising secretary of the Natal Convention, a multiracial conference held in Pietermaritzburg.

On 4 July 1964 police carried out a nationwide raid on more than 60 people. In Natal, attention was focused on Brown alone, and his home and the Party office were searched. This followed similar treatment of white "listed communists" in Johannesburg and Pretoria the previous day. Three weeks later on the 24th, John Harris, a member of the LP, bombed the Johannesburg Station (see links below). He was a member of a small but active sabotage group, the African Resistance Movement. The news of the station bombing was accompanied with the arrest of more party members. After attending an LP National Executive meeting in Johannesburg on 25 July 1964, Brown was served a five-year banning order in terms of the Suppression of Communism Act. This was renewed in 1969. The banning did not allow him to leave Pietermaritzburg, attend any gatherings or visit educational institutions, and he had to report weekly to the police. Practical in his liberalism, Brown’s mobilizing of opposition to the forced removal of blacks from urban areas and farms made him a target of the apartheid state.

This was a heavy blow to the LP. Two leading South African liberals, Alan Paton and Edgar Brookes, showed their appreciation of Brown in an LP internal statement at the time: "although we lack many of the gifts and advantages enjoyed by our banned National Chairman" they asked Liberals "to hold to the course we have always thought right and give us your encouragement and support" as the only way “to show our appreciation of what our National Chairman was, and is" (Vigne, 1997: 190). Shortly after this, an anonymous writer (possibly Paton or Brookes) in Contact on 18 August 1964, outlined Brown’s immense contribution.

In the mid-1970s Brown assisted families of political prisoners via the Pietermaritzburg Dependants' Conference, which he chaired. He was also linked to the Tugela Ferry area Church Agricultural Project. In 1979 the Association for Rural Advancement (Afra) was formed by him in response to apartheid forced removals and farm labour evictions, and he chaired it for 11 years. Afra continues to be very effective, focusing on land claims and farm evictions. Through his chairing of the Pietermaritzburg branch of the Five Freedoms Forum, Brown was included in discussions with the exiled ANC leadership in Lusaka. In the 1990s Brown, a successful farmer himself, actively championed the democratic government’s land restitution initiatives.

In 1997 the University of Natal awarded Brown an honorary Doctorate in Literature. A Civic Certificate of Commendation recognising his work in the community followed in 2000. Brown, a close friend of author and fellow Liberal Party founder Paton, was instrumental in establishing the Alan Paton Centre at the University of KwaZulu-Natal.

Brown died at his home in Pietermaritzburg on 28 June 2004 at the age of 79.

== See also ==
- List of people subject to banning orders under apartheid
