= Adrian Leftwich =

South African student leader

- Born: 1940
- Died: 2 April 2013 (aged 72–73)
- Education: University of Cape Town (BA); University of York (PhD)
- Occupations: Anti-apartheid, politics professor
- Children: 2, including Benjamin

Adrian Leftwich (1940 – 2 April 2013) was a South African student leader active in the early 1960s in the anti-apartheid struggle. He was arrested and turned state evidence against his comrades. He came to Britain, where he completed a D.Phil in Politics and International Relations in 1976, prior to becoming a prominent academic in the politics department at the University of York.

== Early life ==
Leftwich was born to a liberal Jewish family and raised in Cape Town, which he described as "wonderful, almost innocent". His father was a doctor, while his mother gave music lessons and worked in charity. Leftwich attended Rondebosch Boys' High School.

== Anti-apartheid activism in South Africa ==
Leftwich was educated at the University of Cape Town where he was active in student politics. For two years, 1961–1962, he was president of the National Union of South African Students (NUSAS) which opposed the government's apartheid policies. The scholar and author R.W. Johnson heard Leftwich speak at a NUSAS meeting and recalled almost sixty years later that "he spoke with a charm and a power that I have seldom seen equalled".

After leaving his NUSAS office Leftwich became involved in radical underground opposition to the regime. He became best known for turning state evidence against his comrades in a 1964 bomb plot with the African Resistance Movement (ARM). He and a small group of fellow students blew up a Cape Town suburban railway signal cable after which he was detained on 4 July 1964. He collaborated with the police under fear of his sentence if he went to trial, and other members of the movement were arrested and imprisoned. Leftwich was released after giving court evidence for the state against his former friends, and was allowed to go into permanent exile in the United Kingdom. He wrote a confessional piece about the episode that was published in the literary magazine Granta in 2002.

While some of those arrested maintained bitter resentment against Leftwich, others made efforts to reconcile with him. Stephanie Kemp, who spent time in jail for her involvement in the bombing, stated on her Facebook page that she had "gone through a painful journey of reconciliation with him over 12 or more years. He was the same person, although he could never forget his fall almost 50 years ago. I remember him for his courage in taking on the apartheid state at such a young age and his fortitude in bearing the notoriety of stumbling in the face of enormous state repression." Author Hugh Lewin, who was also jailed for his role, wrote of his path to reconciliation with Leftwich in the book Stones Against the Mirror: Friendship in the Time of the South African Struggle.

== Later life ==
In the UK, Leftwich worked on the politics of development, and was one of the foremost thinkers in the now increasingly popular political settlements approach to development, which sees deals between leading groups as crucial for effective development. He co-founded the Developmental Leadership Program, an international initiative that looks into the key roles played by leaders, elites, and coalitions in development. He noted that "development has also managed to come around in states that are run by corrupt elites – just as long as these elites are relatively less corrupt and as long as they are determined in the cause of development, independent of the special interest groups.

== Death ==
He died in 2013 of lung cancer, four months after diagnosis, leaving a daughter and a son, Benjamin Francis Leftwich, both from his third marriage. Leftwich, who was not religious, had a humanist memorial service.

== Publications ==
- Leftwich, Adrian (1974). South Africa: Economic Growth and Political Change: With Comparative Studies of Chile, Sri Lanka and Malaysia. St. Martin's Press.
- Leftwich, Adrian (1994). The Development State. University of York.
- Leftwich, Adrian (1995). Democracy and Development: Theory and Practice. Polity Press.
- Leftwich, Adrian (2000). States of Development: On the Primacy of Politics in Development. Polity Press.
- Leftwich, Adrian (2002). I Gave the Names. Granta, No. 78.
- Leftwich, Adrian (2004). What is Politics?: The Activity and its Study. Polity Press.
- Leftwich, Adrian (2009). Redefining Politics Routledge Library Editions: Political Science Volume 45. Routledge.
- Leftwich, Adrian (2014). Introducing Politics. Polity Press.

== Bibliography ==
- Lewin, Hugh (2011). Stones Against the Mirror: Friendship in the time of the South African Struggle. Penguin Random House South Africa. ISBN 978-1-4152-0207-4.
