= H. Selby Msimang =

South African political leader and activist

- Born: 13 June 1886; Edendale, Pietermaritzburg
- Died: 29 March 1982 (aged 95); Edendale
- Occupations: political leader; activist

Henry Selby Msimang (13 June 1886 - 29 March 1982) was a South African political leader and activist.

== Biography ==
After attending primary school at Edendale he qualified as a teacher at Healdtown in 1907. He became a court interpreter in 1908 and then worked as a postmaster in Krugersdorp. In 1913 became the secretary of the anti-Natives Land Act committee. He became court interpreter at Vrede in 1914 and promoted the employment of African clerks and dip inspectors in the Free State. He joined the African National Congress at its inception.

In 1919 he helped to establish the Industrial and Commercial Workers' Union in Bloemfontein, and edited a newspaper called Messenger-Morumioa. He returned to Johannesburg in 1922, and to Pietermaritzburg in 1941, where he was secretary of the Natal ANC, and then joined the Liberal Party in 1953. He was a founding member of the Liberal Party and a member of the National Committee. Due to his membership of the Liberal Party, he received a banning order from the apartheid government in 1967. He was a lay preacher in the Methodist Church. He died in 1982 aged 95.

== Publications ==
- H. Selby Msimang Looks Back: An Address to the Students of the University of Natal, Pietermaritzburg. South African Institute of Race Relations. 1971. ISBN 978-0-86982-036-0. Published as Topical talks number 25, by The South African Institute of Race Relations: Johannesburg. [Date of publication and copyright status unknown. Available at the Alan Paton Centre, University of KwaZulu-Natal, for study and research purposes.]

== Bibliography ==
- Vigne, Randolph (1997). Liberals Against Apartheid: A History of the Liberal Party of South Africa, 1953-68. Basingstoke: Macmillan. ISBN 978-0-333-71355-6.
- Verwey, E. J. (1995). New Dictionary of South African Biography. HSRC Press. p. 189. ISBN 978-0-7969-1648-8.
- Starfield, Jane (1988). "'Not quite history':The Autobiographies H. Selby Msimang and R.V. Selope Thema and the writing of South African history". Social Dynamics. 14 (2): 16–35. doi:10.1080/02533958808458449. ISSN 0253-3952.
