= Thomas Maskew Miller =

South African bookseller and publisher

Thomas Maskew Miller (1863 – 1930) was a South African bookseller and publisher. Miller founded his namesake press in 1893 as a family business after working for Darter Brothers & Walton. He opened offices in Cape Town, Pretoria, and Bulawayo. Initially, he imported books and stationery for sale, but later he began publishing books himself.

The offices in Pretoria and Bulawayo were only active from 1901 to 1914. In 1924, the firm established itself as a limited company, and the printer was named Maskew Miller Beperk. The two printers published 24 children's books in this era, although they focused mainly on school textbooks. They published children's poetry, fiction, and short stories along with a series known as Maskew Miller se Afrikaanse Leesboekies.

Maskew Miller's business merged with Longman in 1983 to form Maskew Miller Longman. Today Maskew Miller Longman belongs to Pearson Education, itself part of the conglomerate Pearson plc.

== Publications ==
- Maskew Miller's Miniature English Dictionary in the Simplified (Kollewijn) Dutch Spelling. English-Dutch and Dutch-English; 1909
- Maskew Miller's Twintig Stellen Proefopgaven Voor Het Hollands; Cape Town/Pretoria, 1912
- Maskew Millers Hollandse Taalboek voor standaards IV en V.; 1914
- My eerste Leesboekies; by H.J.M. Scheepers, 1919 (the first reader in Afrikaans)
- Maskew Miller se Korte Afrikaans-Engelse woordelysie; by H.J.M. Scheepers; 1922
- Sketse uit die Geskiedenis... Oorgesit in Afrikaans; by H.J.M. S(cheepers); 1922
- Maskew Miller se Afrikaanse Leesboekies; Saamgestel by Francis William Reitz (tweede en verbeterde uitgawe); Cape Town, 1923
- Maskew Miller se Meetkunde ... Vertaal; by J. Steph. V. D. Lingen; Cape Town, 1924
- Maskew Miller se korte geskiedenis van Suid-Afrika (met vele illustrasies) vir die gebruik in skole; by Thomas Young, George McCall Theal, and F.W. Reitz, Cape Town, 1926
- Maskew Miller's Pleasant Stories for Young Readers; 1929
- Maskew Miller se Handelsreeks; 1938
- Maskew Miller se Toetsoefeningkaarte in Rekenkunde; Cape Town, 1940
- Maskew Miller se Afrikaans sonder grense Eerste Addisionele Taal;
- The Mission that Failed!;1898
- Science in South Africa: A Handbook and Review prepared under the auspices of the South African Governments and the South African Association for the Advancement of Science; 1905
- Miller’s New Map of British South Africa ; 1905
- Pre-historic Rhodesia; 1909
- The Bulawayo Cookery Book; 1909
