= World Design Capital =

City promotion project

The World Design Capital (WDC) programme, designated every two years by the World Design Organization (WDO), recognizes cities for their effective use of design to drive economic, social, cultural, and environmental development. Through a year-long programme of events, the designated city showcases best practices in sustainable design-led urban policy and innovation that improves quality of life.

== World Design Capitals by year ==
Year	Location	Source
2008	Turin, Italy	
2010	Seoul, South Korea	
2012	Helsinki, Finland	
2014	Cape Town, South Africa	
2016	Taipei, Taiwan	
2018	Mexico City, Mexico	
2020	Métropole Européenne de Lille, France	
2022	Valencia, Spain	
2024	San Diego, United States*; Tijuana, Mexico*	
2026	Frankfurt Rhine-Main, Germany	
2028	Busan, South Korea	
*transborder collaboration
