= Liberal Party of South Africa =

1953–1968 political party in South Africa

Liberal Party of South Africa Liberale Party van Suid-Afrika (Afrikaans)
- President: Margaret Ballinger; Alan Paton
- Chairman: Dr. Oscar Wolheim; Peter Brown
- Founded: 9 May 1953
- Dissolved: 1968
- Ideology: Liberalism; Anti-apartheid

The Liberal Party of South Africa was a South African political party from 1953 to 1968.

== Founding ==
The party was founded on 9 May 1953 at a meeting of the South African Liberal Association in Cape Town. Essentially, it grew out of a belief that the United Party was unable to achieve any real liberal progress in South Africa. Its establishment occurred during the "Coloured Vote" Constitutional Crisis of the 1950s, and the division of the Torch Commando on the matter of mixed membership.

Founding members of the party included (original positions in the party given):

- Margaret Ballinger (South African MP) – President of party
- Alan Paton (novelist) – Vice-President
- Leo Marquard – Vice President
- Dr. Oscar Wolheim – Chairman
- Leslie Rubin (South African Senator) – Vice-Chairman
- Peter Brown – National Chairman
- Violaine Junod
- Hilda Kuper
- Leo Kuper
- H. Selby Msimang
- Deneys Schreiner

== History ==
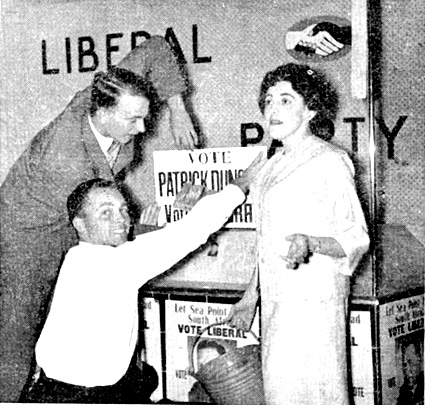
Party members put up posters in Sea Point during the 1959 provincial election campaign

For the first half of its life, the Liberal Party was comparatively conservative and saw its task primarily in terms of changing the minds of the white electorate. It leaned towards a qualified franchise.

This changed in 1959–1960. The Progressive Party, formed from a number of disgruntled United Party MPs in 1959, emerged on the political ground the Liberal Party had occupied up until then. In 1960, the Sharpeville massacre and consequent State of Emergency, during which black organisations were banned and several Liberal Party members were detained, changed the outlook of the party. Another factor was the use of simultaneous translation equipment at party congresses, which enabled black rural members to speak uninhibitedly for the first time. The party reached a peak of four MPs in the South African House of Assembly, all of them from the "Native" representatives, elected under the Cape Qualified Franchise.

In 1960, after the passing of the Promotion of Bantu Self-government Act, the Native representative MPs were abolished, and so the Liberal Party was left without parliamentary representation. The Progressive Party, following the split, had seven but lost all but one in the 1961 general election. The Progressive Party hence came to emerged as the more "relevant" political arm against apartheid, although its programme was more modest, favouring a qualified (but strictly non-racial) franchise akin to the old Cape franchise, indeed similar to that enacted in Rhodesia in 1961.

In the 1960s, therefore, the Liberal Party had evolved into the party unequivocally for a democratic nonracial South Africa, with "one man, one vote" as its franchise policy.

The Liberal Party, despite its opposition to the bantustan system of limited black self-government, also supported liberal candidates in the Transkei elections, and helped its rural members and others, especially in Natal, to resist the ethnic cleansing brought about by the forced removal of black South Africans to bantustans and, to a lesser degree, white South Africans from them. This opposition resulted in the banning of several party members and leaders. Among the black representatives of the Liberal Party Eddie Daniels, a political activist, spent fifteen years on Robben Island concurrent to Nelson Mandela's serving his life sentence there.

== Contact ==
The newspaper Contact was closely tied to the Liberal Party, although officially it was a separate publication. The link is described by Callan as follows:

"Nevertheless, Contact has become so invariably associated in the public mind with the Liberal Party that it now seems merely academic to insist on its independent status."

It may, however, be more accurate to tie the paper to Patrick Duncan than the Liberal Party.

== End ==
The party was in direct conflict with the South African government from the outset. This was due largely to the party's opposition to apartheid and criticism of the erosion of human rights by laws allowing detention without trial and arbitrary suppression of political opposition. Many of its members were placed under bans and persecuted by the South African government, which accused the party of furthering the aims of Communism.

In 1968, the South African government passed the so-called Prohibition of Improper Interference Act, which banned parties from having a multiracial membership. The Liberal Party was therefore forced to choose between disbanding or going underground, and in that same year, chose to disband. The final meeting was held in The Guildhall, Durban.

== See also ==
- African Resistance Movement
- Liberalism
- Contributions to liberal theory
- Liberalism worldwide
- List of liberal parties
- Liberal democracy
- Liberalism in South Africa

== Bibliography ==
- Paton, Alan (1968). Edward Callan (ed.). The long view. London: Pall Mall. ISBN 0-269-99289-8. OL 5718565M.
- Driver, C. J. (2000). Patrick Duncan: South African and Pan-African. James Currey Publishers. ISBN 978-0-85255-773-0.
- Vigne, Randolph (1997). Liberals Against Apartheid: A History of the Liberal Party of South Africa, 1953-68. MacMillan. ISBN 978-0-312-17738-6.
