= African Resistance Movement =

Anti-apartheid movement in South Africa

- Other name: National Committee of Liberation (1960-1964)
- Founded: 1960
- Dissolved: 1964
- Country: South Africa
- Ideology: Non-racialism; Racial color blindness Anti-apartheid
- Status: Defunct

The African Resistance Movement (ARM) was a militant anti-apartheid resistance movement, which operated in South Africa during the early and mid-1960s. It was founded in 1960, as the National Committee of Liberation (NCL), by members of South Africa's Liberal Party, which advocated for the dismantling of apartheid and the gradual transformation of South Africa into a free non-racial society. It was renamed "African Resistance Movement" in 1964.

== NLC/ARM ==
Immediately after the 1960 Sharpeville Massacre, the National Party-led government imposed a state of emergency, which allowed it to apply a broad range of sanctions against its political opponents, such as detention without trial and banning meetings, and enabled the Special Branch to secretly detain and interrogate whomever it deemed a threat to the government, without due process.

After the state of emergency was lifted, the new Minister of Justice, B.J. Vorster, introduced legislation that made many parts of the emergency regulations permanent (the Sabotage Act of 1962, and the 90-day Detention Act of 1963). Much of the Liberal Party's leadership was banned, detained or forced underground, rendering it impotent.

A number of young Liberals became increasingly frustrated and formed the National Liberation Committee (NLC) in 1960. Initially focused on helping hunted people escape the country, the NLC progressed to sabotage government installations and services, explicitly eschewing violence against people. It launched its first operation in September 1963. From then until July 1964, the NLC/ARM bombed power lines, railroad tracks and rolling stock, roads, bridges, and other vulnerable infrastructure, without any civilian casualties. It aimed to turn the white population against the government by creating a situation that would result in capital flight and collapse of confidence in the country and its economy. It launched four attacks in 1961, three in 1962, eight in 1963, and ten in 1964.

In May 1964, the NLC was renamed the African Resistance Movement. The name change coincided with a change in policy following the effective neutralization of MK by security forces after their successful raid on MK's HQ at Rivonia. This development generated internal debates whether its use of arms should strictly adhere to sabotage, or whether to adopt more aggressive guerrilla tactics, despite risk of causing casualties.

This was when Lionel Schwartz, one of the few senior African National Congress (ANC) operatives not to have his cover blown following the raid, joined the NLC. He pushed for a more aggressive guerrilla policy, hoping that civilian casualties would generate public pressure on the security forces to concentrate on this new threat, easing pressure on the remnants of MK not apprehended at Rivonia. Following the name change, ARM in effect operated as an MK proxy.

=== Discovery, arrests and convictions ===
On 4 July 1964, the security police carried out a series of raids, including one on the flat of Adrian Leftwich in Cape Town. Leftwich, a former president of the South African Union of Students and one of the organizers of ARM, possessed a collection of documents in his possession which described virtually the entire history of the NLC, and included a notebook containing the names of and dues paid by each member. During interrogation by the security forces, Leftwich informed on his colleagues. In July, the security police arrested 29 ARM members. After brutal interrogation, several pleaded guilty. Leftwich turned state witness in the trial of five members of the Cape Town group, and in the Johannesburg trial of four members of the Johannesburg group. Of the 29 arrested, 14 were charged and 10 were convicted, receiving jail sentences of between 5 and 15 years.

=== Railway Station Bombing ===
On 24 July, one of the few ARM members still at large, John Harris, placed a phosphorus incendiary device in the whites-only waiting room of Johannesburg Park Station. He telephoned a bomb warning to the police, who did not respond before it exploded, killing a woman and severely burning 23 others. Harris was arrested, following a confession by one of his colleagues, John Lloyd. Like Leftwich, Lloyd turned state witness against his colleague. Harris was convicted of murder and hanged on 1 April 1965, singing "We Shall Overcome" on his way to the gallows. The operation was planned by Lionel Schwartz, who was ARM's most militarily experienced operative, having served as an officer in WW2 in the British army, and in the IDF in Israel's 1948-49 Independence War. He served as a senior (Brig. General) in the IDF until he returned to SA in 1953 or 54.
