= Zeerust Solar Power Station =

Solar farm in South Africa

- Country: South Africa
- Location: Zeerust, Ramotshere Moiloa Local Municipality, North West Province of South Africa
- Coordinates: 25°34′16″S 26°04′20″E
- Status: Operational
- Construction began: 1 January 2019
- Commission date: 1 January 2021
- Owner: Zeerust Solar Company

Solar farm
- Type: Flat-panel PV
- Site area: 179 hectares (440 acres)
- Thermal capacity: 180 GWh

Power generation
- Units operational: 250,080
- Nameplate capacity: 75 MW (101,000 hp)

The Zeerust Solar Power Station is a 75 MW (101,000 hp) solar power plant in South Africa. It is a grid-connected, privately owned and privately funded solar power station.

== Location ==
The power station is located near the town of Zeerust, in Ramotshere Moiloa Local Municipality, in the North West Province of South Africa. This is approximately 68 kilometres (42 mi), by road, northeast of Mahikeng, where the provincial headquarters are located. This is approximately 242 kilometres (150 mi), by road, northwest of Johannesburg, the country's business capital. The geographical coordinates of Zeerust Solar Power Station are: 25°34'16.0"S, 26°04'20.0"E (Latitude:-25.571111; Longitude:26.072222).

== Overview ==
The power station sits on 179 hectares (440 acres) of land and comprises 250,080 solar panels, capable of collectively generating 180 GWh, enough to supply 84,000 South African homes. The power is evacuated via a substation at Kameeldoorn and is sold to the national electricity utility, Eskom, under a long-term power purchase agreement.

== Developers ==
The power station was developed by a consortium, which owns the station and goes under he name: Zeerust Power Company. The consortium comprises the corporate entities listed in the table below.

Zeerust Power Company Ownership
Rank	Name of Owner	Notes
1	African Infrastructure Investment Managers	
2	Reatile Solar Power	
3	Phakwe Solar	
4	African Rainbow Energy and Power	
5	Cicada Community Trust	

== Construction and commissioning ==
The power station was constructed by Cobra Energia, a company based in Madrid, Spain. Construction began in January 2019. The completed power station began commercial production on 1 January 2021.

== Other considerations ==
This power station was licensed under the Renewable Energy Independent Power Purchasing Programme (REIPPP). This program was designed by the Government of South Africa, with the objective of attracting "private investment in the renewable energy sector". The same consortium that developed and owns this solar farm, also developed and owns Boikanyo Solar Power Station, in Douglas, in Siyancuma Local Municipality, in the Pixley ka Seme District Municipality, in the Northern Cape Province of South Africa.

== See also ==
- List of power stations in South Africa
- Eskom
