= Boikanyo Solar Power Station =

South African solar farm

- Country: South Africa
- Location: Douglas, Siyancuma, Pixley ka Seme District, Northern Cape Province
- Coordinates: 29°00′26″S 23°48′21″E
- Status: Operational
- Construction began: April 2020
- Commission date: 9 April 2021
- Owner: Boikanyo Solar Company

Solar farm
- Type: Flat-panel PV
- Site area: 168 hectares (420 acres)
- Thermal capacity: 152 GWh

Power generation
- Units operational: 184,000
- Nameplate capacity: 50 MW (67,000 hp)

The Boikanyo Solar Power Station is a 50 MW (67,000 hp) solar power plant in South Africa. It is a grid-connected, privately owned and privately funded solar power station. The power station, which took about one year to construct, reached "grid code compliance" on 9 April 2021 and provided 450 construction jobs.

== Location ==
The power station is located near the town of Douglas, in Siyancuma Local Municipality, in the Pixley ka Seme District Municipality, in the Northern Cape Province of South Africa. This is approximately 116 kilometres (72 mi), by road, southwest of Kimberly, the provincial headquarters of Northern Cape Province. Douglas is located approximately 595 kilometres (370 mi), by road, southwest of Johannesburg, the country's business capital.

== Overview ==
The power station sits on 168 hectares (420 acres) of "low vale farmland". It comprises 184,000 solar panels, capable of collectively generating 152 GWh annually, enough to supply 62,000 South African homes. The power is evacuated via a 132kV high voltage transmission line to the Siyancuma substation, where the energy is integrated into the national grid. Eskom, the national electricity utility company of South Africa buys the generated electricity, under a twenty-year power purchase agreement.

== Developers ==
The power station was developed by a consortium, which owns the station and has formed a special purpose vehicle company by the name: Boikanyo Power Company. The consortium comprises the corporate entities listed in the table below.

Boikanyo Power Company Ownership
Rank	Name of Owner	Notes
1	Reatile Solar Power	
2	Phakwe Solar	
3	African Rainbow Energy and Power	
4	Cicada Community Trust	
5	African Infrastructure Investment Managers	

== Other considerations ==
This power station was licensed under the Renewable Energy Independent Power Purchasing Programme (REIPPP). This program was designed by the Government of South Africa, with the objective of attracting "private investment in the renewable energy sector".

The same consortium of all South African-based IPPs was granted concessions to develop renewables as illustrated in the table below.

List of Renewables Developed and Owned by the Same Consortium
Rank	Power Station	Location	Energy	Capacity	Status
1	De Wildt Solar Power Station	Brits	Solar	50 MW	Operational
2	Waterloo Solar Power Station	Vryburg	Solar	75 MW	Operational
3	Bokamoso Solar Power Station	Bokamoso	Solar	68 MW	Operational
4	Zeerust Solar Power Station	Zeerust	Solar	75 MW	Operational
5	Boikanyo Solar Power Station	Douglas	Solar	50 MW	Operational

== See also ==
- List of power stations in South Africa
- Greefspan II Solar Power Station
- Zeerust Solar Power Station
