= Norvalspont =

- Location within Northern Cape Location within South Africa
- Coordinates: 30.63°S 25.45°E
- Country: South Africa
- Province: Northern Cape
- District: Pixley ka Seme
- Municipality: Umsobomvu
- Established: 1848

Area
  - Total: 0.9 km^{2} (0.35 sq mi)

Population (2011)
  - Total: 1,198
  - Density: 1,300/km^{2} (3,400/sq mi)

Racial makeup (2011)
  - Black African: 91.7%
  - Coloured: 7.8%
  - Indian/Asian: 0.3%
  - White: 0.0%
  - Other: 0.1%

First languages (2011)
  - Xhosa: 86.3%
  - Afrikaans: 8.7%
  - Sotho: 3.2%
  - Other: 1.8%
- Time zone: UTC+2 (SAST)
- PO box: 9797
- Area code: 051

Norvalspont is a small town in Pixley ka Seme District Municipality in the Northern Cape province of South Africa. The name is Afrikaans for Norval’s ferry, and named after an enterprising Scot who constructed a ferry here in 1848. The settlement lies some 40 km east-north-east of Colesberg and 43 km west-north-west of Venterstad, on the southern bank of the Orange River, just below the Gariep Dam.

At the end of the 19th Century Norvalspont became a strategic station on the Noupoort – Bloemfontein railway line. The first bridge across the Orange River was built in 1889 and allowed British soldiers and their horses to cross the Orange River on their first campaign against the Voortrekkers. People and goods had to be ferried across until the bridge was built. It later sunk and was destroyed during a flood.

There was also a large concentration camp for Afrikaner women and children at Norvalspont during the Second Boer War.

== Anglo-Boer War ==
Boer commandos occupied the Rail transport bridge on 1 November 1899 and successfully invaded the Cape Colony soon after. As the British people military pushed back, the Boers blasted the railway bridge with explosives, destroying three of its central columns on 5 March 1900.

A few days later, a British engineer had started constructing a pontoon bridge which would allow several soldiers on foot and horseback across the river into the Orange Free State. By the end of March, a temporary railway bridge had been constructed. After the war, the original railway bridge was transformed into a road bridge.

Remnants of the Anglo-Boer War, commonly referred to as the Second Boer War like British sangars and a blockhouse along the riverbank, near the pump station can still be found in Norvalspont . The blockhouse has been converted into a homestead with a garden that extends down to the river.

== Norvalspont concentration camp ==
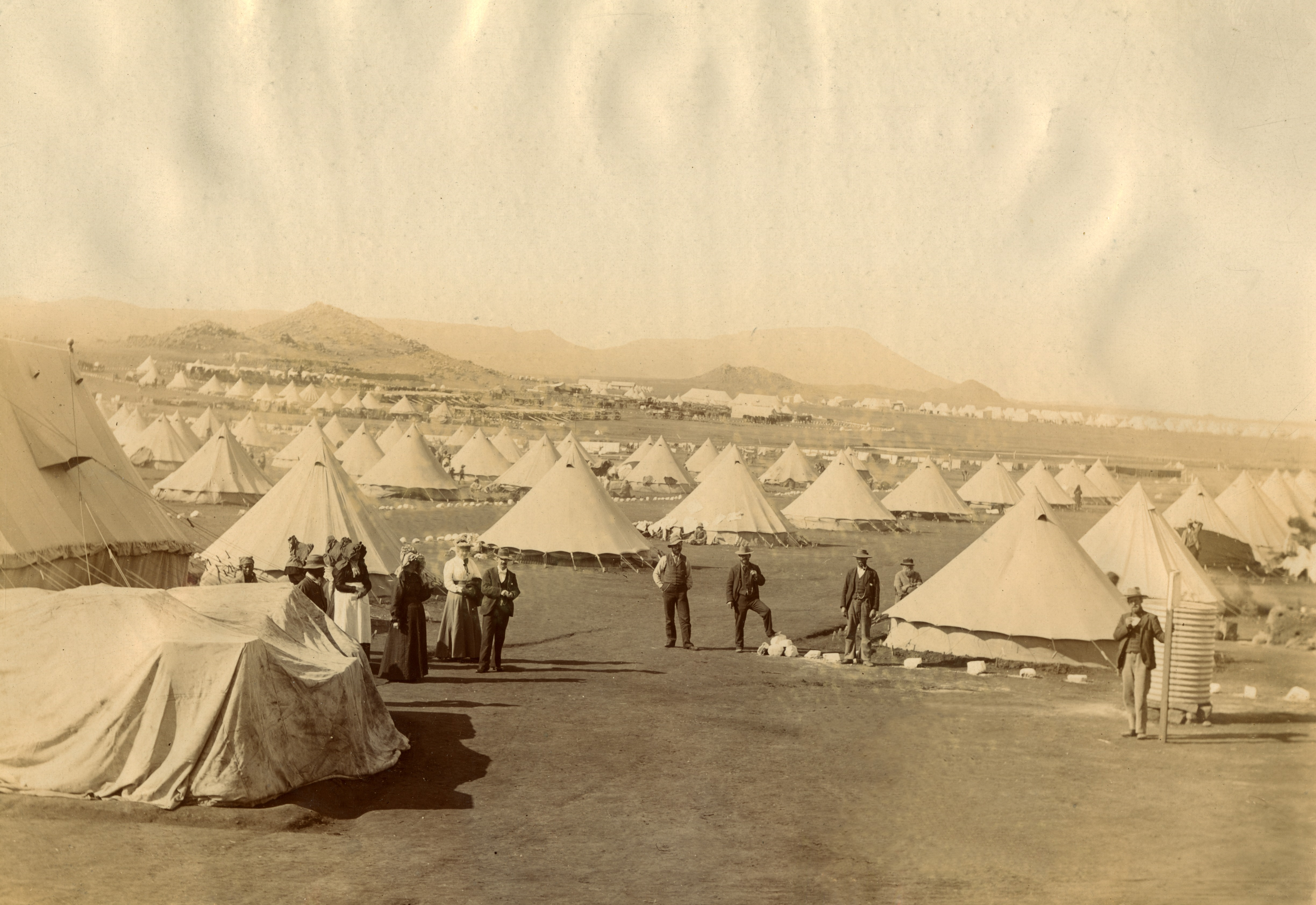
The British concentration camp of Norvalpont, for Boers, c.1901

The Norvalspont concentration camp was established in November 1900 to relieve the Bloemfontein concentration camp after it experienced a water shortage. This Anglo-Boer War concentration camp was first headed by Lieutenant St John Cole Bowen who later held the office of Resident Magistrate in the Orange River Colony.

The camp, initially housing Afrikaner women and children, was situated in the Cape Colony but formed part of the concentration camp complex of the Orange River Colony. About 400 prisoners of war were jailed here by February 1901. In June 1901, hundreds of Bantu peoples were introduced to the camp. In February 1902, the camp had 3 479 residents. This figure grew from about 3000 in June 1901. A school opened on the premises by the end of July 1901 and accommodated 500 children.

Since it was situated on the banks of the Orange River, it had an ample water supply and initially, plenty of wood from the river bush. Residents were housed in white tents with initially only five people per tent. Later, tents would house as many people as possible. Initially, fresh meat, milk, fruit and vegetables were supplied to residents until January 1901 when overpopulation led to only meat and flour being provided.

While conditions were still better, the camp's shoe shop provided a pair of shoes for all the residents. Clothes were also supplied to those who arrived without any.

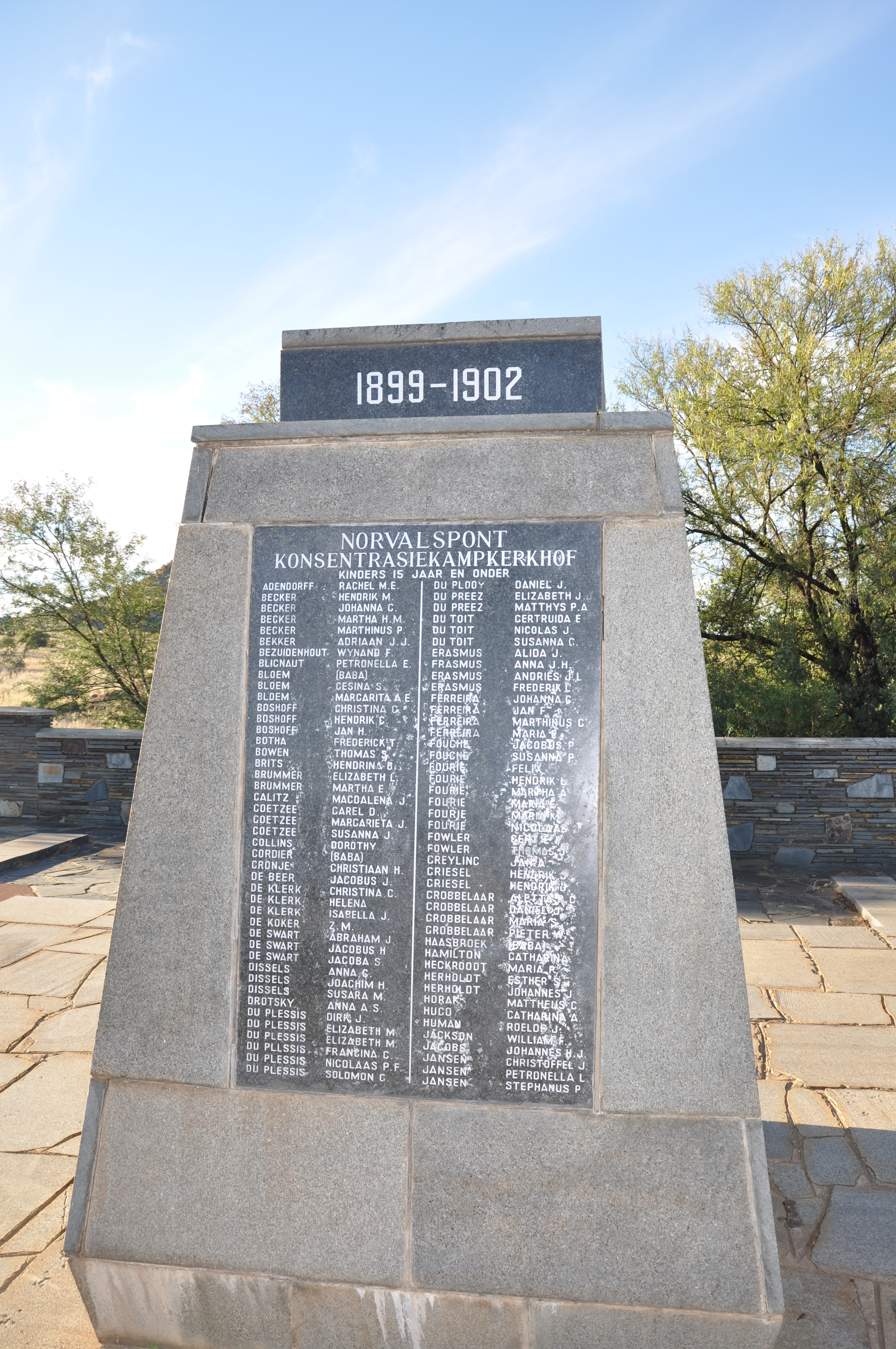
Norvalspunt Concentration Camp Memorial

Soon after the camp was established, a measles epidemic broke out then many inhabitants were infected with scarlet fever and diphtheria. A record of the camp's death figures was only made from January 1901. By July of that year, 412 people are believed to have died in the camp. Reports on the conditions of the camps (including Norvalspont) by British camp doctors attributed the deteriorating health of children to a general lack of hygiene among the Boers and maternal neglect from Boer women. Historians have noted that the suggestions by these doctors were frequently done to absolve their own responsibility for the deteriorating hygienic conditions in the camps.

Even a hundred years after the camp existed, where the tents were positioned is still visible because of the original paving made using empty food and milk tins. A memorial was erected in the local cemetery in honour of those who died in the camp.
