= Castle Wind Farm =

South African wind farm

- Country: South Africa
- Location: De Aar, Emthanjeni, Pixley ka Seme District, Northern Cape
- Coordinates: 30°43′36″S 24°03′06″E
- Status: Under construction
- Construction began: June 2023
- Commission date: 2025 (Expected)
- Owner: Castle Wind Farm Project Company
- Operator: Castle Wind Farm Project Company

Wind farm
- Type: Onshore

Power generation
- Make and model: Goldwind: 6 x 16 MW
- Nameplate capacity: 89 MW

The Castle Wind Farm is a privately owned 89 megawatt wind farm under construction in South Africa. The renewable energy infrastructure development project is owned and under development by a consortium comprising two South African businesses; (a) African Clean Energy Developments (Pty) Limited (“ACED”), a renewable energy development company headquartered in Cape Town and (b) Reatile Group, a Johannesburg-headquartered, 100 percent black-owned investment company which focuses on energy, petrochemicals and industry. The power generated at this wind farm is intended for sale to Sibanye-Stillwater, a Johannesburg-based multinational mining conglomerate. The power is intended for use by Sibanye-Stillwater in its mining operations in South Africa.

== Location ==
The farm and power station are located near the town of De Aar, in Emthanjeni Municipality, Pixley ka Seme District, in the Northern Cape Province of South Africa. De Aar is located approximately 250 kilometres (155 mi) south of the city of Kimberley, the provincial capital. This is approximately 333 kilometres (207 mi) southwest of the city of Bloemfontein in neighboring Free State Province.

== Overview ==
The design calls for 16 tower-mounted Goldwind turbines, each rated at 6 megawatts. Total generation capacity is intended to be 89 MW. The power generated here will be transmitted via overhead high voltage lines, to the Hydra Substation, owned and operated by Eskom, where the power will enter the national grid. Hydra Substation is located approximately 9.3 kilometres (6 mi) southeast of downtown De Aar.

In June 2023, Sibanye-Stillwater, the off-taker, Eskom the transmitter and Castle Wind Farm Project Company, the independent power producer (IPP), signed a 15-year power purchase agreement (PPA) governing their relationships regarding this farm and the power generated here.

== Funding and timeline ==
Rand Merchant Bank, a subsidiary of FirstRand Bank of South Africa, arranged the financing of this wind farm. Construction started in June 2023 and commercial commissioning is expected in 2025.

== Other considerations ==
Expected benefits from this project include (a) energy cost savings (b) increased energy security and (c) mitigation of C02 emissions, all accruing to Sibanye-Stillwater. The additional wattage in generation capacity to the national grid is of benefit to Eskom and the country in decreasing the power deficit currently being experienced in South Africa, as June 2023.

== See also ==
- Eskom
