= De Aar 1 Solar Power Station =

Solar farm in South Africa

- Country: South Africa
- Location: De Aar, Emthanjeni Municipality, Pixley ka Seme District, Northern Cape Province
- Coordinates: 30°35′46″S 24°05′36″E
- Status: Operational
- Commission date: August 2014; 12 years ago
- Owner: Solar Capital
- Operator: Juwi Holding AG

Solar farm
- Type: PV
- Site area: 282 hectares (697 acres)

Power generation
- Nameplate capacity: 85.26 MW (114,340 hp)
- Annual net output: ~150GWh

The De Aar 1 Solar Power Station is an 85.26 MW solar power plant in South Africa. The facility is owned by South African independent power producer (IPP) Solar Capital, a subsidiary of Cape Town-based Phelan Green Group. The project's off-taker, under a 20-year power purchase agreement (PPA), is South African state-owned energy company Eskom.

== Location ==
The power station is located approximately 21 kilometres (13 mi) by road north-east of the town of De Aar, in Emthanjeni Municipality, Pixley ka Seme District, in the Northern Cape Province of South Africa. This solar farm is approximately 243 kilometres (151 mi), south of the city of Kimberley, the provincial headquarters. The geographical coordinates of De Aar 1 Solar Power Station are: 30°35'46.0"S, 24°05'36.0"E (Latitude:-30.596111; Longitude:24.093333).

== Overview ==
The power station sits on an area that measures about 282 hectares (697 acres). The design calls for a ground-mounted solar panel power station with generation capacity of 85.26 MW. The power generated is directed to a 132kV Eskom substation, on the solar farm. From there, the power is evacuated by an overhead 132kV Eskom transmission line that traverses the solar farm. Eskom buys all the power generated here, under a long-term PPA for integration into the South African national grid. The power station reached commercial commissioning in August 2014, as part of Round 1 of the South African government's Renewable Energy Independent Power Producer Procurement Programme (REIPPPP).

== Developers ==
De Aar 1 Solar Power Station is owned and was funded, developed and constructed by Solar Capital (Pty) Limited of South Africa. It was commissioned in August 2014, as the largest solar project of the first round of the REIPPPP arrangement.

== Other considerations ==
In September 2022, online media reported that Juwi Holding AG, a German renewable energy company had been awarded the operations and maintenance (O&M) contract for this power station. The work has been delegated to Juwi's South African subsidiary, based in Cape Town.

== See also ==
- List of power stations in South Africa
