= Noupoort Wind Farm =

Wind farm in South Africa

Noupoort Wind Energy Facility
- Country: South Africa
- Location: Umsobomvu Local Municipality, Pixley ka Seme District Municipality
- Coordinates: 31.180°S 25.045°E
- Status: Commissioned
- Construction began: 2015
- Commission date: 2016
- Owner: Infinity Power
- Operator: Mainstream Renewable Power

Wind farm
- Type: Onshore

Power generation
- Units operational: 35
- Make and model: Siemens turbines of 2.3 MW each
- Nameplate capacity: 80MW
- Main Sub-Contractors: Siemens (Turbines), Concor and Consolidated Power Projects (Construction), Gestamp Wind Turbine Tower Factory

The Noupoort Wind Energy Facility is a wind farm in the Umsobomvu Local Municipality, built 10 km east of Noupoort in the Northern Cape province of South Africa.

Construction commenced May 2015. Delivery of turbines commenced April 2016. Construction was completed mid-2016. It has the capacity to provide power for 91 835 South African homes.
