= Greefspan II Solar Power Station =

Solar farm in South Africa

- Country: South Africa
- Location: Higgs' Hope, Pixley ka Seme District, Northern Cape Province
- Coordinates: 29°23′08″S 23°18′54″E
- Status: Operational
- Construction began: 2018
- Commission date: September 2021
- Owner: Greefspan II Solar Consortium
- Operator: GRS Energy

Solar farm
- Type: Flat-panel PV
- Thermal capacity: 150 GWh

Power generation
- Units operational: 188,822
- Nameplate capacity: 63.2 MW (84,800 hp)

The Greefspan II Solar Power Station, also Greefspan 2 Solar Power Station, is a 63.2 MW (84,800 hp) solar power plant in South Africa. It is a grid-connected, privately owned and privately funded solar power station. The solar farm began commercial operations in September 2021. The power station, whose construction started in 2018, was completed in December 2020. The nine months between completion and commercial commissioning were spent performing "grid connection tests" and other calibrations.

== Location ==
The power station is located near the village of Higgs' Hope, in the Pixley ka Seme District Municipality, in the Northern Cape Province of South Africa. This is approximately half-way between the towns of Prieska and Douglas.

The solar farm is located on the side of Highway R357, approximately 72 kilometres (45 mi) northeast of Prieska. This is about 56 kilometres (35 mi) southwest of the town of Douglas, along the same road.

The geographical coordinates of Greefspan II Solar Power Station are 29°23'08.0"S, 23°18'54.0"E (Latitude:-29.385556; Longitude:23.315000).

== Overview ==
The power station comprises 188,822 solar panels, capable of collectively generating 150 GWh annually, enough to supply 20,000 South African homes. The power is evacuated via a high voltage transmission line to a location where Eskom, the national electricity utility company of South Africa integrates it into the national grid. This renewable energy infrastructure prioject is expected to save South Africa an estimated 130 000 tonnes of carbon dioxide emissions every year.

== Developers ==
The power station was developed by a consortium, which owns the station. For descriptive purposes we will call that consortium: Greefspan II Solar Consortium. The consortium comprises the corporate entities listed in the table below.

Greefspan II Solar Consortium Ownership
Rank	Name of Owner	Notes
1	African Infrastructure Investment Managers (AIIM)	
2	TSK of Spain	
3	Umbono Energy Partners	

== Other considerations ==
This power station was licensed under the fourth round of the Renewable Energy Independent Power Purchasing Programme (REIPPP). This program was designed by the Government of South Africa, with the objective of attracting "private investment in the renewable energy sector".

== Construction ==
The engineering, procurement and construction (EPC) contract was awarded to the Spanish company GRS Energy, a subsidiary of the Gransolar Group. Construction began in 2018 and concluded in December 2020. GRS Energy employed 700 workers at the height of construction, and will continue to operate and manage the power station, with a smaller number of local employees.

== See also ==
- List of power stations in South Africa
- Boikanyo Solar Power Station
