= De Aar Wind Farm =

Wind farm in South Africa

De Aar Wind Energy Facility
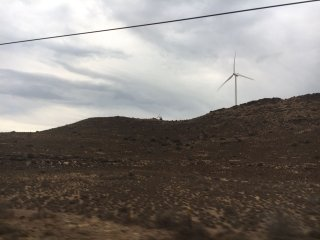
- Country: South Africa
- Location: Emthanjeni Local Municipality, Pixley ka Seme District Municipality
- Coordinates: 30.751°S 23.862°E
- Status: Commissioned
- Construction began: 2016
- Commission date: 2017
- Owners: Longyuan Power Group, Mulilo Renewable Energy, DLO Energy Resources, Sula Energy and a local community trust
- Operator: Longyuan Engineering

Wind farm
- Type: Onshore

Power generation
- Units operational: 96
- Make and model: Goldwing Permanent Magnet Generator with Gearless Direct Drive Rotor 1,5 MW
- Nameplate capacity: 144MW
- Main Sub-Contractors: Goldwing (Turbines), Concor (Construction), United Power Company, Titan Towers (Generator hubs and towers)

The De Aar Wind Energy Facility is a wind farm in the Emthanjeni Local Municipality, built on the Maanhaarberg near De Aar in the Northern Cape province of South Africa. The facility became operational in November 2017.
