= Carnarvon Airport =

Carnarvon Airport may refer to:

- Carnarvon Airport (Australia), in Carnarvon, Western Australia
- Carnarvon Airport (South Africa), in Carnarvon, Northern Cape
