= R384 (South Africa) =

Regional route in South Africa

Regional route R384
- R384 route map

Route information
- Length: 146 km (91 mi)

Major junctions
- West end: R386 in Carnarvon
- R403 in Vosburg
- East end: N12 in Britstown

Location
- Country: South Africa

Highway system
- Numbered routes of South Africa
| ← R383 | → R385 |

The R384 is a Regional Route in Northern Cape, South Africa that connects Carnarvon with Britstown.

== Route ==
Its western origin is a junction with the R386 in Carnarvon. It heads east-north-east, through the Kareeberge via the Kareebospoort and Volstruispoort passes to reach Vosburg, where it crosses the R403. From Vosburg, it heads east to its eastern terminus at a junction with the N12 at Britstown.
