= R403 road =

R403 road may refer to:

- R403 road (Ireland)
- R403 road (South Africa)
