= Merriman, South Africa =

Merriman
- Location within Northern Cape Location within South Africa
- Coordinates: 31°13′S 23°37′E
- Country: South Africa
- Province: Northern Cape
- District: Pixley ka Seme
- Municipality: Ubuntu

Area
  - Total: 0.52 km^{2} (0.20 sq mi)

Population (2011)
  - Total: 78
  - Density: 150/km^{2} (390/sq mi)

Racial makeup (2011)
  - Black African: 7.7%
  - Coloured: 82.1%
  - White: 10.3%

First languages (2011)
  - Afrikaans: 91.0%
  - English: 6.4%
  - Xhosa: 2.6%
- Time zone: UTC+2 (SAST)
- Area code: 0536912

Merriman is a village on the R398 road in the central Karoo region of South Africa.
