= Umsobomvu Local Municipality elections =

The Umsobomvu Local Municipality council consists of thirteen members elected by mixed-member proportional representation. Seven councillors are elected by first-past-the-post voting in seven wards, while the remaining six are chosen from party lists so that the total number of party representatives is proportional to the number of votes received. In the election of 1 November 2021 the African National Congress (ANC) won a majority of seven seats.

== Results ==
The following table shows the composition of the council after past elections.

Event	ANC	DA	Other	Total
2000 election	7	3	0	10
2006 election	8	1	1	10
2011 election	7	1	2	10
2016 election	7	3	1	11
2021 election	7	2	4	13

== December 2000 election ==
The following table shows the results of the 2000 election.

Party	Ward			List			Total seats
Party	Votes	%	Seats	Votes	%	Seats	Total seats
African National Congress	4,343	63.68	4	4,506	69.47	3	7
Democratic Alliance	1,747	25.62	1	1,777	27.40	2	3
Independent candidates	595	8.72	0				0
Inkatha Freedom Party	135	1.98	0	203	3.13	0	0
Total	6,820	100.00	5	6,486	100.00	5	10
Valid votes	6,820	97.01		6,486	92.47		
Invalid/blank votes	210	2.99		528	7.53		
Total votes	7,030	100.00		7,014	100.00		
Registered voters/turnout	11,749	59.83		11,749	59.70		

== March 2006 election ==
The following table shows the results of the 2006 election.

Party	Ward			List			Total seats
Party	Votes	%	Seats	Votes	%	Seats	Total seats
African National Congress	6,051	77.81	5	6,036	77.64	3	8
Democratic Alliance	813	10.45	0	838	10.78	1	1
Independent Democrats	783	10.07	0	769	9.89	1	1
African Christian Democratic Party	97	1.25	0	74	0.95	0	0
United Independent Front	33	0.42	0	57	0.73	0	0
Total	7,777	100.00	5	7,774	100.00	5	10
Valid votes	7,777	97.62		7,774	97.66		
Invalid/blank votes	190	2.38		186	2.34		
Total votes	7,967	100.00		7,960	100.00		
Registered voters/turnout	13,584	58.65		13,584	58.60		

== May 2011 election ==
The following table shows the results of the 2011 election.

Party	Ward			List			Total seats
Party	Votes	%	Seats	Votes	%	Seats	Total seats
African National Congress	6,515	68.35	5	6,562	69.04	2	7
Congress of the People	1,719	18.03	0	1,732	18.22	2	2
Democratic Alliance	1,298	13.62	0	1,210	12.73	1	1
Total	9,532	100.00	5	9,504	100.00	5	10
Valid votes	9,532	97.65		9,504	97.64		
Invalid/blank votes	229	2.35		230	2.36		
Total votes	9,761	100.00		9,734	100.00		
Registered voters/turnout	13,954	69.95		13,954	69.76		

== August 2016 election ==
The following table shows the results of the 2016 election.

Party	Ward			List			Total seats
Party	Votes	%	Seats	Votes	%	Seats	Total seats
African National Congress	6,643	68.08	6	6,685	68.31	1	7
Democratic Alliance	2,385	24.44	0	2,335	23.86	3	3
Economic Freedom Fighters	585	6.00	0	577	5.90	1	1
Congress of the People	65	0.67	0	121	1.24	0	0
Freedom Front Plus	79	0.81	0	68	0.69	0	0
Total	9,757	100.00	6	9,786	100.00	5	11
Valid votes	9,757	98.20		9,786	98.37		
Invalid/blank votes	179	1.80		162	1.63		
Total votes	9,936	100.00		9,948	100.00		
Registered voters/turnout	14,710	67.55		14,710	67.63		

== November 2021 election ==
The following table shows the results of the 2021 election.

Party	Ward			List			Total seats
Party	Votes	%	Seats	Votes	%	Seats	Total seats
African National Congress	4,857	51.78	5	4,859	51.87	2	7
Umsobomvu Residents Association	2,738	29.19	2	2,753	29.39	2	4
Democratic Alliance	1,163	12.40	0	1,149	12.27	2	2
Freedom Front Plus	343	3.66	0	335	3.58	0	0
Economic Freedom Fighters	177	1.89	0	163	1.74	0	0
Patriotic Alliance	101	1.08	0	108	1.15	0	0
Independent candidates	1	0.01	0				0
Total	9,380	100.00	7	9,367	100.00	6	13
Valid votes	9,380	98.37		9,367	98.31		
Invalid/blank votes	155	1.63		161	1.69		
Total votes	9,535	100.00		9,528	100.00		
Registered voters/turnout	14,874	64.11		14,874	64.06		
