= Siyancuma Local Municipality elections =

The Siyancuma Local Municipality council consists of thirteen members elected by mixed-member proportional representation. Seven councillors are elected by first-past-the-post voting in seven wards, while the remaining six are chosen from party lists so that the total number of party representatives is proportional to the number of votes received. In the election of 1 November 2021 the African National Congress (ANC) lost its majority, but remains the largest party on the council, with six seats.

== Results ==
The following table shows the composition of the council after past elections.

Event	ANC	DA	EFF	Other	Total
2000 election	6	3	—	—	9
2006 election	6	3	—	0	9
2011 election	7	2	—	2	11
2016 election	8	3	2	0	13
2021 election	6	3	1	3	13

== December 2000 election ==
The following table shows the results of the 2000 election.

Party	Ward			List			Total seats
Party	Votes	%	Seats	Votes	%	Seats	Total seats
African National Congress	5,577	69.21	5	5,645	70.10	1	6
Democratic Alliance	2,481	30.79	0	2,408	29.90	3	3
Total	8,058	100.00	5	8,053	100.00	4	9
Valid votes	8,058	96.96		8,053	96.90		
Invalid/blank votes	253	3.04		258	3.10		
Total votes	8,311	100.00		8,311	100.00		
Registered voters/turnout	15,279	54.39		15,279	54.39		

== March 2006 election ==
The following table shows the results of the 2006 election.

Party	Ward			List			Total seats
Party	Votes	%	Seats	Votes	%	Seats	Total seats
African National Congress	5,397	65.56	4	5,440	66.14	2	6
Democratic Alliance	2,406	29.23	1	2,511	30.53	2	3
African Christian Democratic Party	174	2.11	0	274	3.33	0	0
Independent candidates	255	3.10	0				0
Total	8,232	100.00	5	8,225	100.00	4	9
Valid votes	8,232	97.05		8,225	96.83		
Invalid/blank votes	250	2.95		269	3.17		
Total votes	8,482	100.00		8,494	100.00		
Registered voters/turnout	16,329	51.94		16,329	52.02		

== May 2011 election ==
The following table shows the results of the 2011 election.

Party	Ward			List			Total seats
Party	Votes	%	Seats	Votes	%	Seats	Total seats
African National Congress	6,757	63.40	6	6,808	63.82	1	7
Congress of the People	1,968	18.47	0	1,987	18.63	2	2
Democratic Alliance	1,824	17.11	0	1,785	16.73	2	2
African Christian Democratic Party	109	1.02	0	88	0.82	0	0
Total	10,658	100.00	6	10,668	100.00	5	11
Valid votes	10,658	97.98		10,668	98.26		
Invalid/blank votes	220	2.02		189	1.74		
Total votes	10,878	100.00		10,857	100.00		
Registered voters/turnout	18,445	58.98		18,445	58.86		

== August 2016 election ==
The following table shows the results of the 2016 election.

Party	Ward			List			Total seats
Party	Votes	%	Seats	Votes	%	Seats	Total seats
African National Congress	7,182	58.14	6	7,145	58.06	2	8
Democratic Alliance	2,398	19.41	1	2,449	19.90	2	3
Economic Freedom Fighters	2,230	18.05	0	2,203	17.90	2	2
Freedom Front Plus	349	2.83	0	294	2.39	0	0
Congress of the People	162	1.31	0	216	1.76	0	0
Independent candidates	31	0.25	0				0
Total	12,352	100.00	7	12,307	100.00	6	13
Valid votes	12,352	98.62		12,307	98.46		
Invalid/blank votes	173	1.38		192	1.54		
Total votes	12,525	100.00		12,499	100.00		
Registered voters/turnout	19,719	63.52		19,719	63.39		

== November 2021 election ==
The following table shows the results of the 2021 election.

Party	Ward			List			Total seats
Party	Votes	%	Seats	Votes	%	Seats	Total seats
African National Congress	5,032	49.44	5	5,340	54.93	1	6
Democratic Alliance	2,040	20.04	0	2,954	30.39	3	3
Independent candidates	2,227	21.88	2				2
Freedom Front Plus	458	4.50	0	787	8.10	1	1
Economic Freedom Fighters	422	4.15	0	640	6.58	1	1
Total	10,179	100.00	7	9,721	100.00	6	13
Valid votes	10,179	97.94		9,721	93.61		
Invalid/blank votes	214	2.06		664	6.39		
Total votes	10,393	100.00		10,385	100.00		
Registered voters/turnout	19,436	53.47		19,436	53.43		

Following the election, the African National Congress (ANC) lost its majority, with the Democratic Alliance (DA), the two independents, Freedom Front Plus (FF+) and the Economic Freedom Fighters (EFF) co-operating to oust the (ANC), electing Wim van Bergen as mayor.

The coalition did not last, with the ANC and EFF forming a coalition shortly after.

=== By-elections from November 2021 ===
The following by-elections were held to fill vacant ward seats in the period since November 2021.

Date	Ward	Party of the previous councillor	Party of the newly elected councillor
11 Oct 2023	6	African National Congress	African National Congress
3 Sep 2025	4	Independent politician	Democratic Alliance
26 Nov 2025	5	African National Congress	Independent politician

After the November 2025 by-election, the council was reconfigured as below:

Party	Seats		
Party	Ward	List	Total
African National Congress	4	1	5
Democratic Alliance	1	3	4
Independent candidate	2	0	2
Freedom Front Plus	0	1	1
Economic Freedom Fighters	0	1	1
Total	7	6	13
