= Ubuntu Local Municipality elections =

Municipal elections in South Africa

The Ubuntu Local Municipality council consists of eleven members elected by mixed-member proportional representation. Six councillors are elected by first-past-the-post voting in six wards, while the remaining five are chosen from party lists so that the total number of party representatives is proportional to the number of votes received. In the election of 1 November 2021 the African National Congress (ANC) won a majority of seven seats.

== Results ==
The following table shows the composition of the council after past elections.

Event	ANC	DA	Other	Total
2000 election	4	4	—	8
2006 election	5	3	0	8
2011 election	4	3	1	8
2016 election	3	2	2	7
2021 election	7	3	1	11

== December 2000 election ==
The following table shows the results of the 2000 election.

Party	Ward			List			Total seats
Party	Votes	%	Seats	Votes	%	Seats	Total seats
Democratic Alliance	2,703	51.36	2	2,640	50.22	2	4
African National Congress	2,560	48.64	2	2,617	49.78	2	4
Total	5,263	100.00	4	5,257	100.00	4	8
Valid votes	5,263	98.08		5,257	98.35		
Invalid/blank votes	103	1.92		88	1.65		
Total votes	5,366	100.00		5,345	100.00		
Registered voters/turnout	7,892	67.99		7,892	67.73		

== March 2006 election ==
The following table shows the results of the 2006 election.

Party	Ward			List			Total seats
Party	Votes	%	Seats	Votes	%	Seats	Total seats
African National Congress	3,051	60.31	4	3,172	61.45	1	5
Democratic Alliance	1,689	33.39	0	1,648	31.93	3	3
Independent Civic Organisation of South Africa	171	3.38	0	223	4.32	0	0
African Christian Democratic Party	87	1.72	0	66	1.28	0	0
United Independent Front	61	1.21	0	53	1.03	0	0
Total	5,059	100.00	4	5,162	100.00	4	8
Valid votes	5,059	98.23		5,162	98.46		
Invalid/blank votes	91	1.77		81	1.54		
Total votes	5,150	100.00		5,243	100.00		
Registered voters/turnout	8,640	59.61		8,640	60.68		

== May 2011 election ==
The following table shows the results of the 2011 election.

Party	Ward			List			Total seats
Party	Votes	%	Seats	Votes	%	Seats	Total seats
African National Congress	3,325	53.06	4	3,379	54.05	0	4
Democratic Alliance	1,994	31.82	0	2,008	32.12	3	3
Congress of the People	854	13.63	0	865	13.84	1	1
Independent candidates	93	1.48	0				0
Total	6,266	100.00	4	6,252	100.00	4	8
Valid votes	6,266	98.03		6,252	97.87		
Invalid/blank votes	126	1.97		136	2.13		
Total votes	6,392	100.00		6,388	100.00		
Registered voters/turnout	9,169	69.71		9,169	69.67		

== August 2016 election ==
The following table shows the results of the 2016 election.

Party	Ward			List			Total seats
Party	Votes	%	Seats	Votes	%	Seats	Total seats
African National Congress	2,547	40.10	1	2,758	44.00	2	3
Democratic Alliance	1,717	27.03	1	2,222	35.45	1	2
Independent candidates	1,736	27.33	2				2
Congress of the People	78	1.23	0	825	13.16	0	0
Economic Freedom Fighters	205	3.23	0	329	5.25	0	0
Freedom Front Plus	69	1.09	0	134	2.14	0	0
Total	6,352	100.00	4	6,268	100.00	3	7
Valid votes	6,352	97.60		6,268	96.27		
Invalid/blank votes	156	2.40		243	3.73		
Total votes	6,508	100.00		6,511	100.00		
Registered voters/turnout	9,707	67.04		9,707	67.08		

== November 2021 election ==
The following table shows the results of the 2021 election.

Party	Ward			List			Total seats
Party	Votes	%	Seats	Votes	%	Seats	Total seats
African National Congress	3,515	60.89	6	3,545	62.13	1	7
Democratic Alliance	1,584	27.44	0	1,756	30.77	3	3
Freedom Front Plus	218	3.78	0	221	3.87	1	1
Economic Freedom Fighters	170	2.94	0	184	3.22	0	0
Independent candidates	286	4.95	0				0
Total	5,773	100.00	6	5,706	100.00	5	11
Valid votes	5,773	98.40		5,706	97.26		
Invalid/blank votes	94	1.60		161	2.74		
Total votes	5,867	100.00		5,867	100.00		
Registered voters/turnout	9,678	60.62		9,678	60.62		
