= FACN =

FACN may refer to:

- Fellow of the American College of Nutrition
- FACN, the ICAO code for Carnarvon Airport (South Africa)
