= Hutchinson, South Africa =

Hutchinson
- Location within Northern Cape Location within South Africa
- Coordinates: 31°29′51″S 23°11′21″E
- Country: South Africa
- Province: Northern Cape
- District: Pixley ka Seme
- Municipality: Ubuntu

Area
  - Total: 1.98 km^{2} (0.76 sq mi)

Population (2011)
  - Total: 367
  - Density: 185/km^{2} (480/sq mi)

Racial makeup (2011)
  - Black African: 13.4%
  - Coloured: 84.2%
  - Indian/Asian: 1.4%
  - White: 1.1%

First languages (2011)
  - Afrikaans: 89.1%
  - Xhosa: 7.4%
  - English: 1.9%
  - Sotho: 1.1%
  - Other: 0.5%
- Time zone: UTC+2 (SAST)
- Area code: 053612

Hutchinson is a village and former railway junction in the Northern Cape province of South Africa. It is located 12 kilometres (7 mi) south-east of Victoria West, on the Cape Town–Kimberley railway line. According to the 2011 census it has 367 residents.

Hutchinson was founded on the arrival of the railway line from Cape Town in 1883, as a station named Victoria West Road. In 1901 it was renamed after Sir Walter Hely-Hutchinson, then Governor of the Cape Colony. In 1905 Hutchinson became a junction when a branch line to Victoria West and Carnarvon was opened. This line was extended in 1915 to Williston and in 1918 to Calvinia. It was closed in 2001, but passenger trains on the main line still stop at Hutchinson to serve Victoria West.

Hutchinson is located in the Ubuntu Local Municipality, which is part of the Pixley ka Seme District Municipality. It is situated just off the R63 regional route.
