= Emthanjeni Local Municipality elections =

The Emthanjeni Local Municipality council consists of fifteen members elected by mixed-member proportional representation. Eight councillors are elected by first-past-the-post voting in eight wards, while the remaining seven are chosen from party lists so that the total number of party representatives is proportional to the number of votes received. In the election of 1 November 2021 the African National Congress (ANC) won a majority of nine seats.

== Results ==
The following table shows the composition of the council after past elections.

| Event | ANC | DA | EFF | Other | Total |
|---|---|---|---|---|---|
| 2000 election | 8 | 6 | — | 0 | 14 |
| 2006 election | 9 | 2 | — | 3 | 14 |
| 2011 election | 7 | 5 | — | 2 | 14 |
| 2016 election | 9 | 5 | 1 | 0 | 15 |
| 2021 election | 9 | 4 | 1 | 1 | 15 |

== December 2000 election ==
The following table shows the results of the 2000 election.

| Party | Ward | | | List | | | Total seats |
| Party | Votes | % | Seats | Votes | % | Seats | Total seats |
|---|---|---|---|---|---|---|---|
| African National Congress | 6,102 | 55.10 | 4 | 6,144 | 55.78 | 4 | 8 |
| Democratic Alliance | 4,737 | 42.78 | 3 | 4,721 | 42.86 | 3 | 6 |
| United Democratic Movement | 132 | 1.19 | 0 | 150 | 1.36 | 0 | 0 |
| Independent candidates | 103 | 0.93 | 0 | | | | 0 |
| Total | 11,074 | 100.00 | 7 | 11,015 | 100.00 | 7 | 14 |
| Valid votes | 11,074 | 97.70 | | 11,015 | 97.66 | | |
| Invalid/blank votes | 261 | 2.30 | | 264 | 2.34 | | |
| Total votes | 11,335 | 100.00 | | 11,279 | 100.00 | | |
| Registered voters/turnout | 18,669 | 60.72 | | 18,669 | 60.42 | | |

== March 2006 election ==
The following table shows the results of the 2006 election.

| Party | Ward | | | List | | | Total seats |
| Party | Votes | % | Seats | Votes | % | Seats | Total seats |
|---|---|---|---|---|---|---|---|
| African National Congress | 7,358 | 65.10 | 6 | 7,327 | 64.85 | 3 | 9 |
| Independent Democrats | 2,002 | 17.71 | 0 | 2,100 | 18.59 | 3 | 3 |
| Democratic Alliance | 1,575 | 13.94 | 1 | 1,628 | 14.41 | 1 | 2 |
| United Independent Front | 107 | 0.95 | 0 | 131 | 1.16 | 0 | 0 |
| African Christian Democratic Party | 121 | 1.07 | 0 | 113 | 1.00 | 0 | 0 |
| Independent candidates | 139 | 1.23 | 0 | | | | 0 |
| Total | 11,302 | 100.00 | 7 | 11,299 | 100.00 | 7 | 14 |
| Valid votes | 11,302 | 98.44 | | 11,299 | 98.32 | | |
| Invalid/blank votes | 179 | 1.56 | | 193 | 1.68 | | |
| Total votes | 11,481 | 100.00 | | 11,492 | 100.00 | | |
| Registered voters/turnout | 21,157 | 54.27 | | 21,157 | 54.32 | | |

== May 2011 election ==
The following table shows the results of the 2011 election.

| Party | Ward | | | List | | | Total seats |
| Party | Votes | % | Seats | Votes | % | Seats | Total seats |
|---|---|---|---|---|---|---|---|
| African National Congress | 6,869 | 51.20 | 5 | 7,233 | 53.22 | 2 | 7 |
| Democratic Alliance | 4,440 | 33.10 | 1 | 4,569 | 33.62 | 4 | 5 |
| Congress of the People | 808 | 6.02 | 0 | 1,789 | 13.16 | 1 | 1 |
| Independent candidates | 1,298 | 9.68 | 1 | | | | 1 |
| Total | 13,415 | 100.00 | 7 | 13,591 | 100.00 | 7 | 14 |
| Valid votes | 13,415 | 96.71 | | 13,591 | 97.71 | | |
| Invalid/blank votes | 457 | 3.29 | | 318 | 2.29 | | |
| Total votes | 13,872 | 100.00 | | 13,909 | 100.00 | | |
| Registered voters/turnout | 22,239 | 62.38 | | 22,239 | 62.54 | | |

== August 2016 election ==
The following table shows the results of the 2016 election.

| Party | Ward | | | List | | | Total seats |
| Party | Votes | % | Seats | Votes | % | Seats | Total seats |
|---|---|---|---|---|---|---|---|
| African National Congress | 8,393 | 58.22 | 7 | 8,264 | 57.42 | 2 | 9 |
| Democratic Alliance | 4,950 | 34.33 | 1 | 5,004 | 34.77 | 4 | 5 |
| Economic Freedom Fighters | 830 | 5.76 | 0 | 832 | 5.78 | 1 | 1 |
| Freedom Front Plus | 142 | 0.98 | 0 | 144 | 1.00 | 0 | 0 |
| Congress of the People | 102 | 0.71 | 0 | 149 | 1.04 | 0 | 0 |
| Total | 14,417 | 100.00 | 8 | 14,393 | 100.00 | 7 | 15 |
| Valid votes | 14,417 | 98.88 | | 14,393 | 98.71 | | |
| Invalid/blank votes | 163 | 1.12 | | 188 | 1.29 | | |
| Total votes | 14,580 | 100.00 | | 14,581 | 100.00 | | |
| Registered voters/turnout | 23,073 | 63.19 | | 23,073 | 63.20 | | |

== November 2021 election ==
The following table shows the results of the 2021 election.

| Party | Ward | | | List | | | Total seats |
| Party | Votes | % | Seats | Votes | % | Seats | Total seats |
|---|---|---|---|---|---|---|---|
| African National Congress | 6,784 | 60.43 | 7 | 6,809 | 60.18 | 2 | 9 |
| Democratic Alliance | 2,932 | 26.12 | 1 | 3,055 | 27.00 | 3 | 4 |
| Economic Freedom Fighters | 484 | 4.31 | 0 | 548 | 4.84 | 1 | 1 |
| Patriotic Alliance | 380 | 3.38 | 0 | 608 | 5.37 | 1 | 1 |
| Freedom Front Plus | 260 | 2.32 | 0 | 294 | 2.60 | 0 | 0 |
| Independent candidates | 386 | 3.44 | 0 | | | | 0 |
| Total | 11,226 | 100.00 | 8 | 11,314 | 100.00 | 7 | 15 |
| Valid votes | 11,226 | 98.44 | | 11,314 | 98.63 | | |
| Invalid/blank votes | 178 | 1.56 | | 157 | 1.37 | | |
| Total votes | 11,404 | 100.00 | | 11,471 | 100.00 | | |
| Registered voters/turnout | 22,544 | 50.59 | | 22,544 | 50.88 | | |

=== By-elections from November 2021 ===
The following by-elections were held to fill vacant ward seats in the period since November 2021.

| Date | Ward | Party of the previous councillor | Party of the newly elected councillor |
|---|---|---|---|
| 24 Apr 2024 | 3 | African National Congress | African National Congress |
