= R386 (South Africa) =

Regional route in South Africa

Regional route R386
- R386 route map

Route information
- Length: 156 km (97 mi)

Major junctions
- South end: R63 in Carnarvon
- R384 in Carnarvon; R361 near Carnarvon
- North end: R357 near Prieska

Location
- Country: South Africa

Highway system
- Numbered routes of South Africa
← R385	→ R387

The R386 is a Regional Route in Northern Cape, South Africa that connects Carnarvon with Prieska.

== Route ==
The R386 begins in Carnarvon at a junction with the R63 route. It heads eastwards as Van Riebeeck Street before turning north as Daniel Street to meet the western terminus of the R384 route. It heads northwards for 8 kilometres to meet the southern terminus of the R361 route. It continues north-north-east for 146 kilometres to meet the northern terminus of the R403 route before reaching its end at a junction with the R357 route approximately 13 kilometres south-west of Prieska, just south-west of the R357's junction with the N10 national route.
