= R403 (South Africa) =

Regional route in South Africa

Regional route R403

Route information
- Length: 182 km (113 mi)

Major junctions
- South end: N12 near Victoria West
- R384 near Vosburg
- North end: R386 near Prieska

Location
- Country: South Africa

Highway system
- Numbered routes of South Africa
← R402	→ R404

The R403 is a Regional Route in South Africa that connects the N12 near Victoria West with Prieska via Vosburg.

== Route ==
The R403 begins approximately 5 kilometres north of Victoria West at a junction with the N12 national route. It heads northwards for 94 kilometres to reach a junction with the R384 route south of Vosburg. It continues northwards through Vosburg and for another 86 kilometres to reach its end at a junction with the R386 route approximately 20 kilometres south of Prieska.
