= Cyffylliog =

Village in Denbighshire, Wales

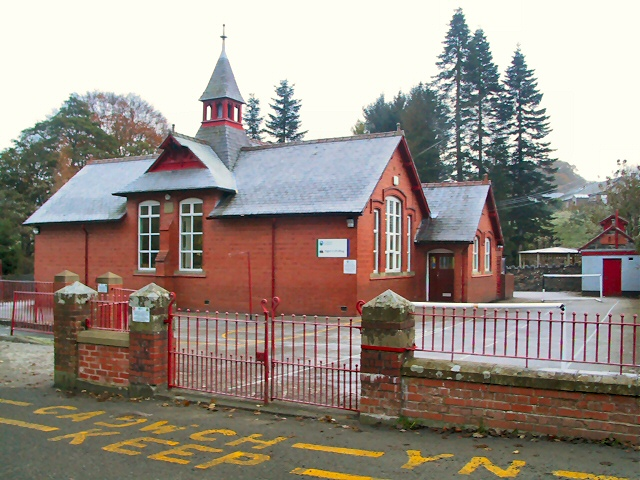
- Cyffylliog village school

- Location within Denbighshire
- OS grid reference: SJ058577
- Community: Cyffylliog
- Principal area: Denbighshire
- Country: Wales
- Sovereign state: United Kingdom
- Post town: RUTHIN
- Postcode district: LL15
- Dialling code: 01824
- Police: North Wales
- Fire: North Wales
- Ambulance: Welsh
- UK Parliament: Clwyd East
- Senedd Cymru – Welsh Parliament: Clwyd West
- List of places UK Wales Denbighshire 53.108°N 3.406°W Map of the community

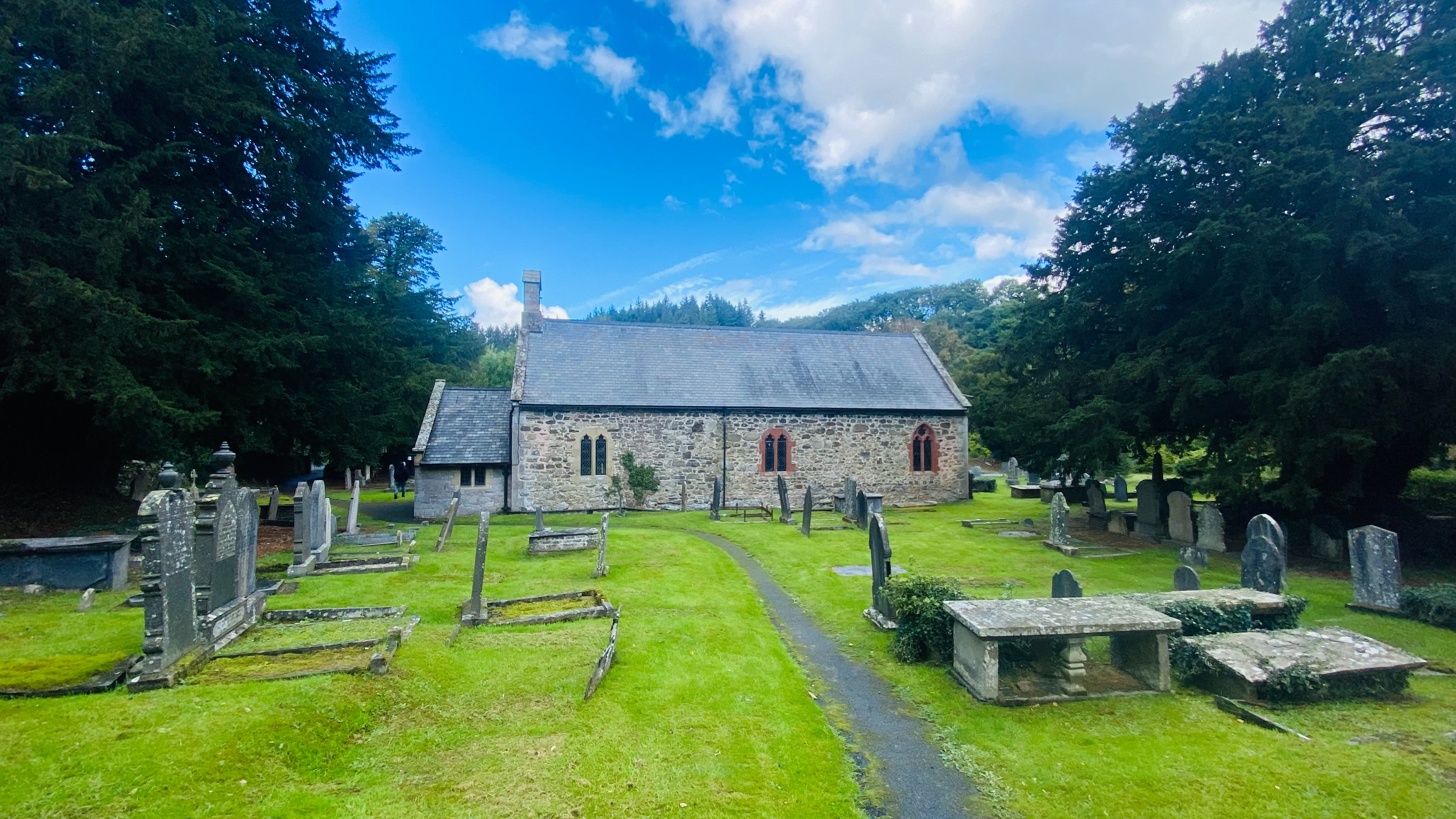
St. Mary's Church

Cyffylliog (sometimes Welsh: Y Gyffylliog) is a village and community in Denbighshire, Wales. It is situated to the west of Ruthin on the banks of the River Clywedog. The community covers an area of 12.20 square miles (31.59 km^{2}) and includes the hamlet of Bontuchel and a section of Clocaenog Forest. It has a population of 495 at the time of the 2011 census, a slight increase from 484 during the 2001 census. The name of the village means "place of pollard trees/stumps" and comes from the Welsh word cyffyll meaning stumps.

The village has a small, bilingual primary school, Ysgol Cyffylliog, which had 25 pupils in 2011.

== Church of St Mary ==
The village church, St. Mary's, dates from the late 12th century but has been extensively renewed since that time including an almost complete rebuilding in 1876. Although the church has been arduously restored, it retains its late medieval ceiling and an unusual Georgian ‘hearse house’. The church is open for private prayer at all times.

The village also has a Presbyterian chapel, Salem Chapel.
