= Vosburg =

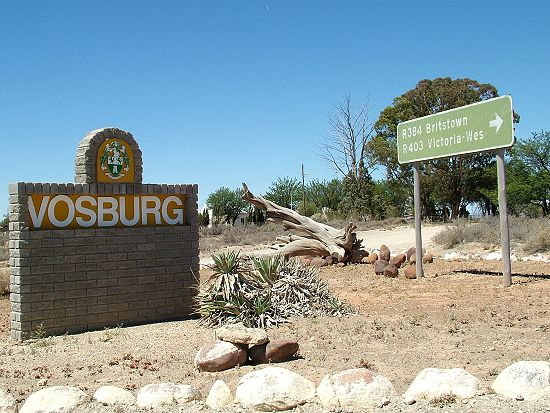
- Vosburg

- Location within Northern Cape Location within South Africa
- Coordinates: 30°34′S 22°53′E
- Country: South Africa
- Province: Northern Cape
- District: Pixley ka Seme
- Municipality: Kareeberg

Area
  - Total: 65.50 km^{2} (25.29 sq mi)

Population (2011)
  - Total: 1,259
  - Density: 19.22/km^{2} (49.78/sq mi)

Racial makeup (2011)
  - Coloured: 79.6%
  - Black African: 11.8%
  - White: 7.2%
  - Indian/Asian: 1.1%
  - Other: 0.2%

First languages (2011)
  - Afrikaans: 89.2%
  - Xhosa: 4.5%
  - English: 2.0%
  - Tswana: 1.1%
  - Other: 3.2%
- Time zone: UTC+2 (SAST)
- PO box: 8780
- Area code: 053

Vosburg is a town 61 km west of Britstown, in the Northern Cape province of South Africa. The town has relatively low crime rate and features many 19th-century buildings.

Town 100 km north-north-west of Victoria West, 70 km west of Britstown and 94 km north-east of Carnarvon. It was founded in 1895 and became a municipality in 1897. Named after the Vos family, who owned the farm on which it was laid out.

== History ==
The town was established on the farm Processfontein in 1895 and was named after Mr J Vos and the Van Rensburg family.
