= R398 (South Africa) =

Regional route in South Africa

Regional route R398
- R398 route map

Route information
- Length: 211 km (131 mi)

Major junctions
- South-east end: R56 / N9 / N10 in Middelburg
- N1 in Richmond
- North-west end: N12 near Britstown

Location
- Country: South Africa

Highway system
- Numbered routes of South Africa
| ← R397 | → R399 |

The R398 is a Regional Route in South Africa that connects Middelburg with Britstown via Richmond.

== Route ==
The R398 begins in the town centre of Middelburg, Eastern Cape, at a junction with Meintjies Street. East of this junction, it is the R56 road. The R398 begins by heading westwards as Loop Street before making a right and left turn to become Richmond Road.

It heads westwards from Middelburg for 107 kilometres, crossing into the Northern Cape, to reach a junction with the N1 national route just east of Richmond. The R398 joins the N1 and they are one road westwards into the town before the R398 becomes its own road northwards just north of the town centre.

The R398 heads north-west for 105 kilometres, through Merriman, to reach its end at a junction with the N12 national route approximately 16 kilometres south of Britstown.
