= Noupoort =

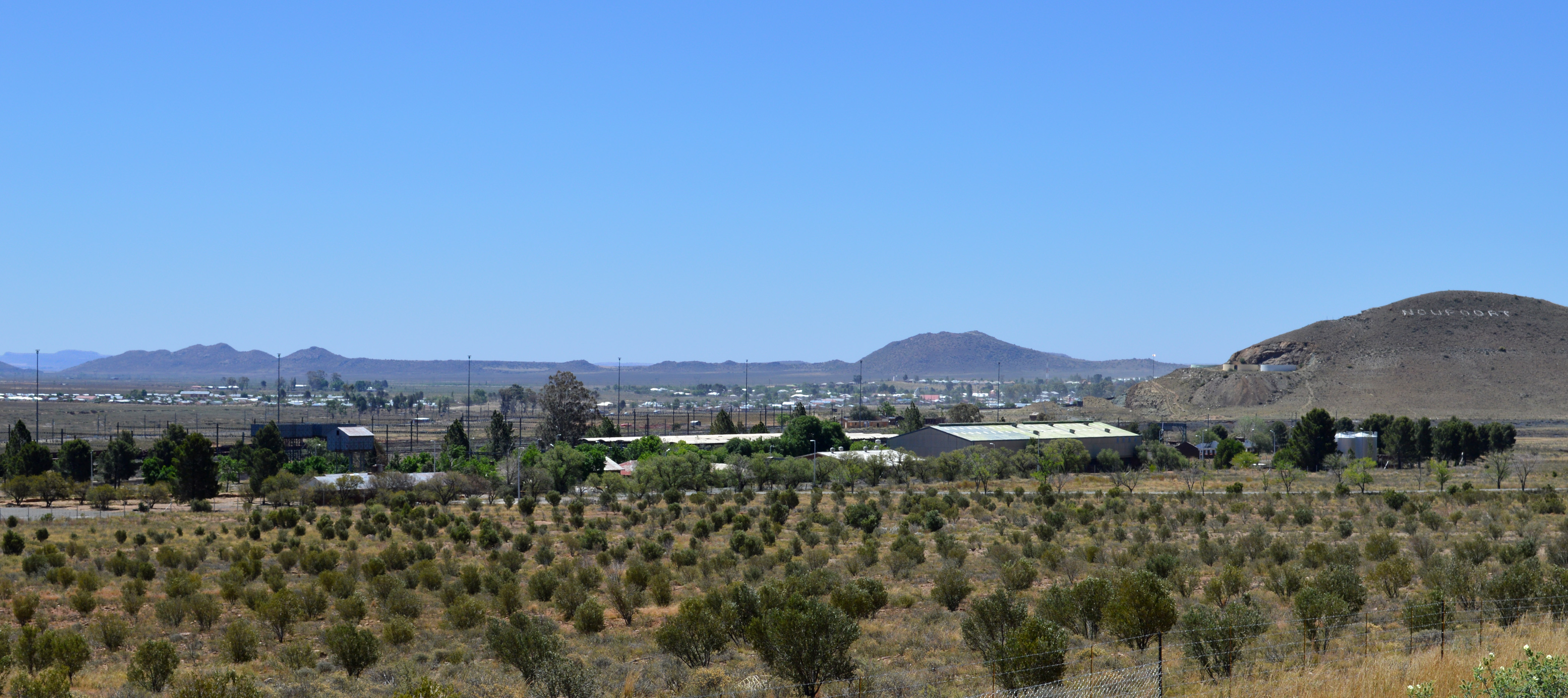
- View over Noupoort

- Location within Northern Cape Location within South Africa
- Coordinates: 31°11′S 24°57′E
- Country: South Africa
- Province: Northern Cape
- District: Pixley ka Seme
- Municipality: Umsobomvu

Area
  - Total: 10.2 km^{2} (3.9 sq mi)
- Elevation: 1,494 m (4,902 ft)

Population (2011)
  - Total: 7,848
  - Density: 769/km^{2} (1,990/sq mi)

Racial makeup (2011)
  - Black African: 54.0%
  - Coloured: 41.5%
  - Indian/Asian: 0.5%
  - White: 3.7%
  - Other: 0.2%

First languages (2011)
  - Xhosa: 48.2%
  - Afrikaans: 47.7%
  - English: 1.5%
  - Other: 2.6%
- Time zone: UTC+2 (SAST)
- Postal code (street): 5950
- PO box: 5950
- Area code: 049843

Noupoort is a small town in the eastern Karoo region of South Africa.

The town lies 54 km south of Colesberg and 45 km north of Rosmead Junction on the N9 National Route. It was laid out on a portion of the farm Caroluspoort, was administered by a village management board from 1937 and attained municipal status in 1942. Afrikaans for ‘narrow pass’, the name refers to a gap in the Carlton Hills 27 km to the north-west.

== Economy ==
The town revolved principally around the railways and is still used as traction change-over facility from diesel to electric locomotives on the Noupoort-Bloemfontein line. It was serviced by Midlandia, a locomotive complex a few kilometres to the south of town, especially during the diesel era up to the late 1900s. Nowadays it links up with the electrified line to De Aar, part of the main artery for iron ore and manganese exports from the Northern Cape through Port Elizabeth harbour on the south coast.

Commercial activity in Noupoort is heavily dependent on railway activity. After a long period of increasingly less demand on the rail network, the town suffered from a drastic decline in local business leading to increasingly dire socioeconomic conditions for the local population. Poverty increased concomitantly with the decline in rail activity.

=== Wind farms ===
The Noupoort area is considered a good location for constructing wind farms. This is because of its excellent wind resource, proximity to national roads for transportation wind turbines, favourable construction conditions, straightforward electrical connection into the Eskom grid, and low environmental impact of the construction.

10km east of Noupoort is the Noupoort Wind Farm. It has been fully operational since 2016.

Currently in development near Middelburg and Noupoortis the "Koruson 1" cluster of three wind farms (Phezukomoya, San Kraal and Coleskop), each with installed capacities of 140 MW, totalling 420 MW. The project is expected to be commercially operational by the first quarter of 2025.

== Christian Care Centre ==
In 1992, the Noupoort Christian Care Centre was established with the purpose of drug and alcohol rehabilitation in the area. The Centre took advantage of run down existing infrastructure to build a large centre. The remoteness of Noupoort soon promoted the centre as the last resort for rehabilitation.

The town's reaction was initially negative to hosting such a rehabilitation program and the program was received with much suspicion, which proved to be true after multiple abuse cases and deaths which occurred due to negligence.

== Climate ==
Climate data for Noupoort, elevation 1,496 m (4,908 ft), (1991–2020 normals)
| Month | Jan | Feb | Mar | Apr | May | Jun | Jul | Aug | Sep | Oct | Nov | Dec | Year |
|---|---|---|---|---|---|---|---|---|---|---|---|---|---|
| Mean daily maximum °C (°F) | 31.5 (88.7) | 30.1 (86.2) | 27.8 (82.0) | 23.5 (74.3) | 19.7 (67.5) | 16.5 (61.7) | 16.6 (61.9) | 19.2 (66.6) | 23.7 (74.7) | 26.6 (79.9) | 28.6 (83.5) | 30.7 (87.3) | 24.5 (76.2) |
| Daily mean °C (°F) | 22.9 (73.2) | 22.2 (72.0) | 19.8 (67.6) | 15.8 (60.4) | 12.0 (53.6) | 8.6 (47.5) | 8.4 (47.1) | 10.5 (50.9) | 14.3 (57.7) | 17.5 (63.5) | 19.7 (67.5) | 21.9 (71.4) | 16.1 (61.0) |
| Mean daily minimum °C (°F) | 14.4 (57.9) | 14.3 (57.7) | 11.8 (53.2) | 8.2 (46.8) | 4.3 (39.7) | 0.7 (33.3) | 0.3 (32.5) | 1.7 (35.1) | 5.0 (41.0) | 8.5 (47.3) | 10.8 (51.4) | 13.1 (55.6) | 7.8 (46.0) |
| Average precipitation mm (inches) | 38.7 (1.52) | 59.0 (2.32) | 65.9 (2.59) | 36.3 (1.43) | 19.9 (0.78) | 9.6 (0.38) | 10.2 (0.40) | 13.1 (0.52) | 15.6 (0.61) | 25.5 (1.00) | 32.6 (1.28) | 33.8 (1.33) | 360.2 (14.16) |
| Average precipitation days (≥ 1.0 mm) | 4.1 | 5.9 | 6.2 | 4.3 | 2.6 | 1.6 | 1.3 | 1.5 | 1.9 | 3.2 | 3.5 | 3.6 | 39.7 |
Source: Starlings Roost Weather (precipitation 1884–2023)
