= R399 (South Africa) =

Regional route in South Africa

Regional route R399
- R399 route map

Route information
- Length: 86 km (53 mi)

Major junctions
- East end: N7 near De Hoek and Piketberg
- R27 in Velddrif
- West end: R45 in Vredenburg

Location
- Country: South Africa
- Towns: De Hoek; Velddrif; Vredenburg

Highway system
- Numbered routes of South Africa
← R398	→ R400

The R399 is a Regional Route in South Africa that connects Vredenburg with the N7 between Piketberg and De Hoek.

== Route ==
An east–west route, its western terminus is a four-way intersection with the R45 in Vredenburg. The R45 enters from the south (from Saldanha) and turns right, heading east towards Hopefield. Meanwhile, the northern road becomes the R399. It exits Vredenburg heading northeast for 20 kilometres where it meets the R27. These two roads are co-signed heading north for two kilometres, crossing the Berg River and entering Velddrif. At a four-way intersection in Velddrif, the R399 leaves heading east. It continues for 59 kilometres until a T-junction near De Hoek. The northern route is unsigned and continues to Piketberg while the south route is signed as the R399 ending at the N7.
