= Isaac Hughes (missionary) =

Welsh Calvinist missionary (1798–1870)

Isaac Hughes (1798 – 23 June 1870) was a British Calvinist missionary and preacher. He was born to Welsh parents Edward and Mary Hughes in Manchester. His father came from Bontuchel in Denbighshire and his mother came from Brynsiencyn in Anglesey. After some time in Sheffield and Rotherham, he married Elizabeth Jones from Llangollen on 18 August 1823 and departed Britain a month later on 24 September on a ship from Gravesend, arriving in Cape Town, South Africa on 30 December. He initially worked as a blacksmith, reaching Kuruman in August 1824 and Griquatown in late 1827, also working in Lattakoo and Graham's Town. In 1839 he became a missionary. In 1845 he worked along the Vaal River and opened a new station in Backhouse, which later developed into the town Douglas. After his wife died he remarried a missionary's daughter, Anne Magdalena Vogelgezang, in 1850. He died on 23 June 1870 after a 47-year career.
