= Bontuchel =

Hamlet in Denbighshire, Wales

Coordinates: 53.109°N 3.368°W

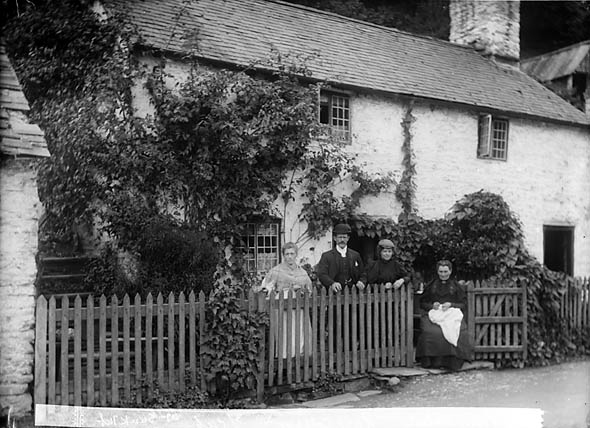
- Rose Cottage, Bontuchel

- Location within Denbighshire
- OS grid reference: SJ084577
- Community: Cyffylliog
- Principal area: Denbighshire
- Country: Wales
- Sovereign state: United Kingdom
- Post town: RUTHIN
- Postcode district: LL15
- Dialling code: 01824
- Police: North Wales
- Fire: North Wales
- Ambulance: Welsh
- UK Parliament: Bangor Aberconwy
- Senedd Cymru – Welsh Parliament: Clwyd West

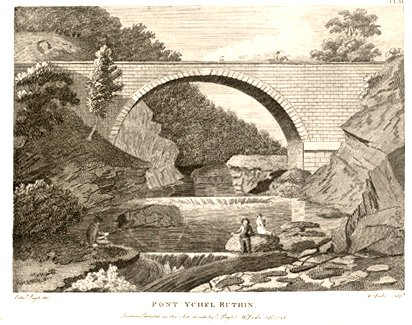
The bridge which gives its name to the village; 1796.

Bontuchel is a hamlet in Denbighshire, Wales, located 2.8 miles (4.5 km) by road west of Ruthin. The father of Calvinist Isaac Hughes hailed from Bontuchel.
