= Phelan Green Group =

South African independent power producer

- Type: Private
- Industry: Energy; Renewable energy Fuel
- Founded: 2005; 21 years ago
- Founder: Paschal Phelan
- Headquarters: Cape Town, South Africa
- Area served: South Africa
- Key people: Paschal Phelan (Chairman)
- Products: Electricity; Clean fuels
- Divisions: Phelan gEPC
- Subsidiaries: Solar Capital; Phelan eFuels
- Website: phelangreen.com

Phelan Green Group (PGG), sometimes referred to simply as Phelan Green, is a South African renewable energy company and independent power producer (IPP). It develops energy solutions in the solar PV, battery storage (BESS), wind, and eFuels sectors.

Headquartered in Cape Town, Phelan has over 500MW of renewable energy generation capacity, with a further 5,000MW of active pipeline projects, as of 2026.

== History ==
Phelan Green Group was established in 2005, following founder Paschal Phelan's interest in solar energy solutions.

In December 2011, PGG subsidiary Solar Capital won the bid to build the De Aar 1 Solar Power Station in the Northern Cape, and output 75MW into the Eskom grid. The bid was awarded as part of Bid Window 1 of the South African Government's Renewable Energy Independent Power Producer Procurement Program (REIPPPP). The initial development and contracted capacity ended being 94MW, over a 20-year contract term.

In 2016, Solar Capital completed Phase III of the De Aar solar farm project, which added 90 MW to the overall project, bringing its total capacity up to 175MW. This translated to enough power to supply up to 100,000 homes.

At the 2nd South African Green Hydrogen Summit, in October 2023, Phelan announced the Saldanha Green Hydrogen Project, which it would be constructing at a cost of R47 billion. The plant is expected to use solar and wind power, and generate 85,000 tons of green hydrogen per year. The project aimed to create 2,500 jobs during construction, and 500 specialized permanent jobs post development. Planning was anticipated to complete by Q3 2024, and the project had a target operation date of early 2026. The timeline has since shifted, and in mid-2026, construction was expected to complete by the end of the year.

In November 2023, the SA Government granted the Phelan Green Hydrogen Project a Strategic Investment Project (SIP) status. Under SIP legislation, projects considered strategically important are given priority treatment, and access to mechanisms intended to get their infrastructure built faster. The project will contribute towards the Western Cape's Green Hydrogen Strategy, approved in 2024, which has the goal of producing between 300,000 and 420,000 tons of green hydrogen per year for export.

By April 2026, Phelan had developed the downstream concept of its Green Hydrogen Project to integrate an electro sustainable aviation fuel (eSAF) component, which now forms a core part of the overall hydrogen project. Through the use of American manufacturer Honeywell's Universal Oil Products Fischer Tropsch (FT) Unicracking process technology, Phelan's plant will produce eSAF that complies with aviation industry standards. Once operational, the project will be one of the world's first commercial-scale eSAF production facilities, supplying more than 140,000 tons per year of eSAF to the EU and the UK.

== Operations ==
The group operates South African subsidiary Solar Capital for solar PV projects, clean fuels subsidiary Phelan eFuels, as well as gEPC, an engineering, procurement and construction division. Phelan Group maintains an HQ in Cape Town, and regional offices in Dubai, Dublin, New Delhi, and Afghanistan.

== See also ==
- Renewable energy in South Africa
- Electricity sector in South Africa
