= Kareeberg Local Municipality =

Kareeberg
- Local municipality
- Location in the Northern Cape
- Coordinates: 30°40′S 22°10′E
- Country: South Africa
- Province: Northern Cape
- District: Pixley ka Seme
- Seat: Carnarvon
- Wards: 6

Government
  - Type: Municipal council
  - Mayor: Monray Julian Maczali (KCM)

Area
  - Total: 17,702 km^{2} (6,835 sq mi)

Population (2011)
  - Total: 11,673
  - Density: 0.65942/km^{2} (1.7079/sq mi)

Racial makeup (2011)
  - Black African: 4.8%
  - Coloured: 85.1%
  - Indian/Asian: 0.5%
  - White: 9.1%

First languages (2011)
  - Afrikaans: 95.9%
  - English: 1.3%
  - Other: 2.8%
- Time zone: UTC+2 (SAST)
- Municipal code: NC074

Kareeberg Municipality (Afrikaans: Kareeberg Munisipaliteit) is a local municipality within the Pixley ka Seme District Municipality, in the Northern Cape province of South Africa. The name originates from a mountain range in the region, the Karee Mountains.

== Main places ==
The 2001 census divided the municipality into the following main places:

Place	Code	Area (km^{2})	Population	Most spoken language
Carnarvon	31001	8.07	5,235	Afrikaans
Van Wyksvlei	31003	8.54	1,418	Afrikaans
Vosburg	31004	0.99	1,125	Afrikaans
Remainder of the municipality	31002	17,681.08	1,702	Afrikaans

== Demographics ==
According to the 2022 South African census, the municipality had a population of 10,961 people, a slight decrease from the 2011 population of 11,673. 86.4% of residents identified as "Coloured," 9.2% as "White," and 3.6% as "Black African."

== Politics ==
The municipal council consists of eleven members elected by mixed-member proportional representation. Six councillors are elected by first-past-the-post voting in six wards, while the remaining five are chosen from party lists so that the total number of party representatives is proportional to the number of votes received. In the election of 1 November 2021 no party obtained a majority of seats on the council. The following table shows the results of the election.

Kareeberg local election, 1 November 2021
Party	Votes				Seats		
Party	Ward	List	Total	%	Ward	List	Total
African National Congress	2,166	2,173	4,339	44.2%	5	0	5
Economic Freedom Fighters	926	912	1,838	18.7%	1	1	2
Kareeberg Civic Movement	825	871	1,696	17.3%	0	2	2
Democratic Alliance	815	793	1,608	16.4%	0	2	2
Freedom Front Plus	165	162	327	3.3%	0	0	0
Independent candidates	16	–	16	0.2%	0	–	0
Total	4,913	4,911	9,824		6	5	11
Valid votes	4,913	4,911	9,824	99.3%			
Spoilt votes	34	31	65	0.7%			
Total votes cast	4,947	4,942	9,889				
Voter turnout	4,951						
Registered voters	7,536						
Turnout percentage	65.7%						

=== By-elections from November 2021 ===
The following by-elections were held to fill vacant ward seats in the period from the election in November 2021.

Date	Ward	Party of the previous councillor	Party of the newly elected councillor
31 May 2022	4	African National Congress	Democratic Alliance
