= Carnarvon Airport (South Africa) =

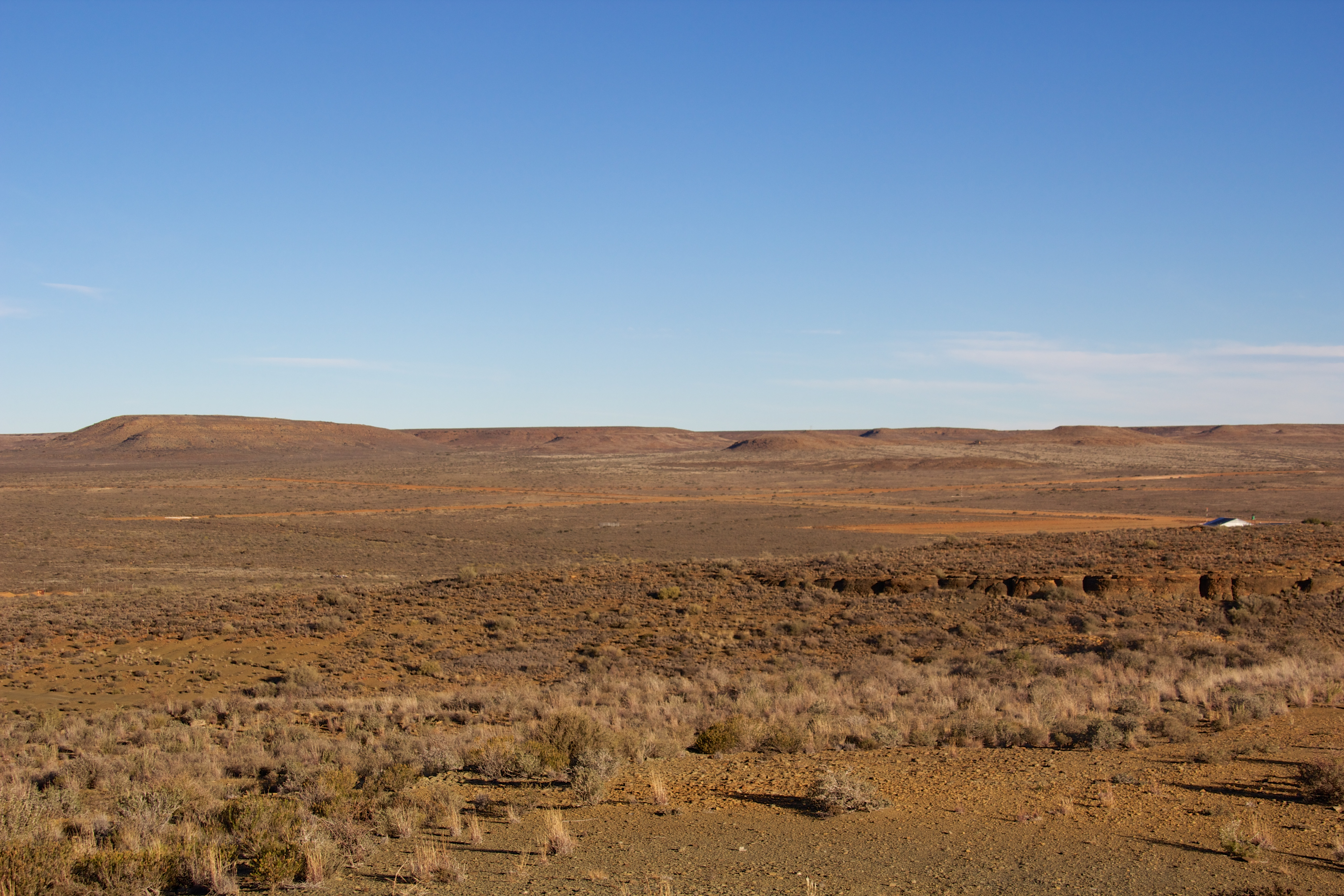
- IATA: none; ICAO: FACN

Summary
- Airport type: Small Airport
- Serves: Carnarvon
- Location: Carnarvon, South Africa
- Elevation AMSL: 4,150 ft / 1,265 m
- Coordinates: 30°59′15″S 22°07′50″E

Map
- Location in Northern Cape FACN (South Africa)

Runways
Direction	Length		Surface
Direction	m	ft	Surface
16/34	1,285	4,216	Gravel
12/30	1,097	3,599	Gravel
05/23	1,280	4,199	Gravel

Carnarvon Airport (IATA: FACN) is a small South African airport located in Carnarvon (Pixley ka Seme District Municipality), Northern Cape. The airport is managed by the Carnarvon Flying Club. It mainly accommodates light and ultra-light aircraft.

The Carnarvon Flying Club hosts an annual Fly-In to raise funds to maintain and improve the airport. The last major upgrade was adding runway edge lights along runway 16/34.

== Airfield information ==
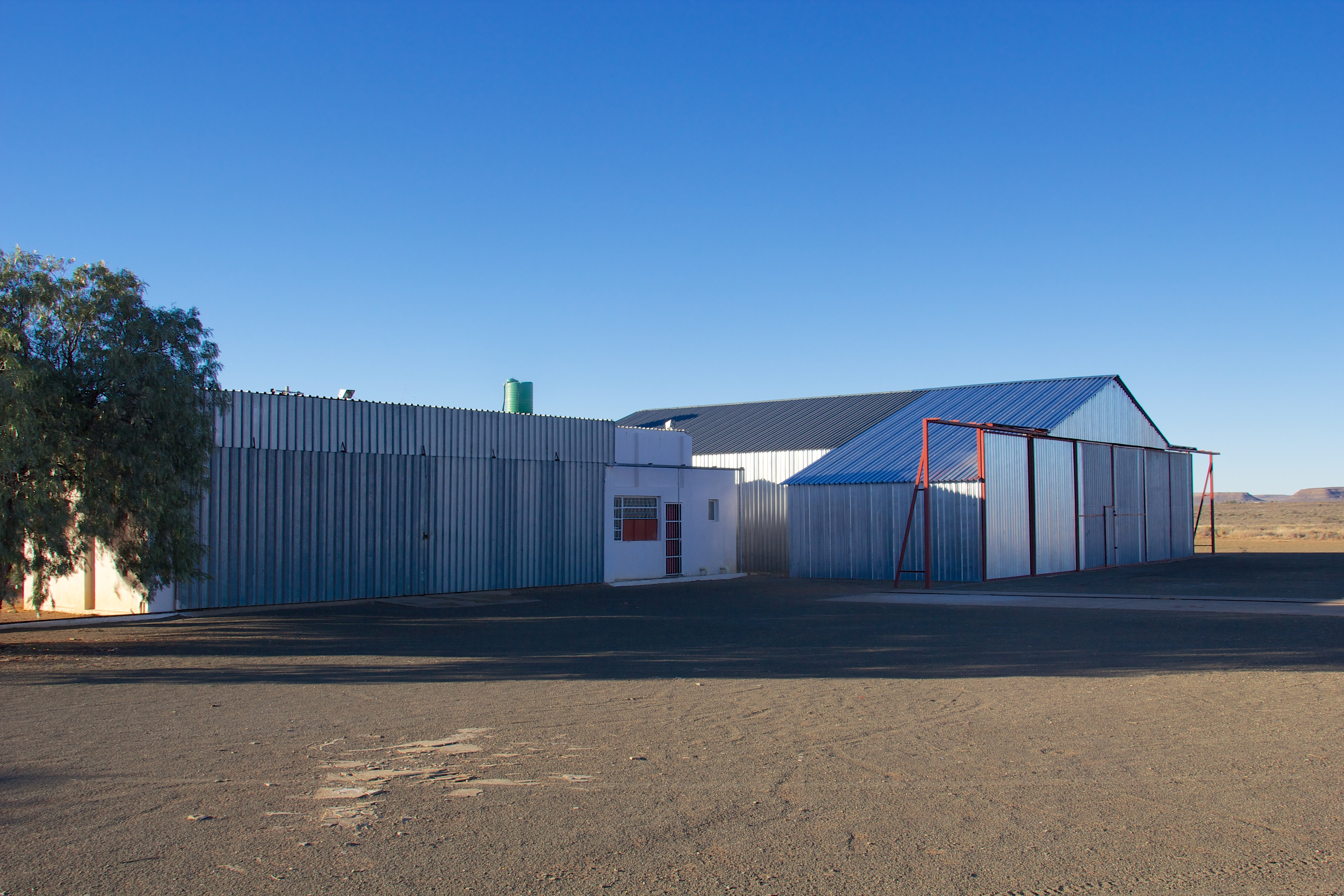
Carnarvan Airport hangars

- Communication Frequencies
  - Carnarvon Ground 124.80 MHz (Only during Fly-In)
- Runway lights only on runway 16/34.
