= Carnarvon, South Africa =

Carnarvon
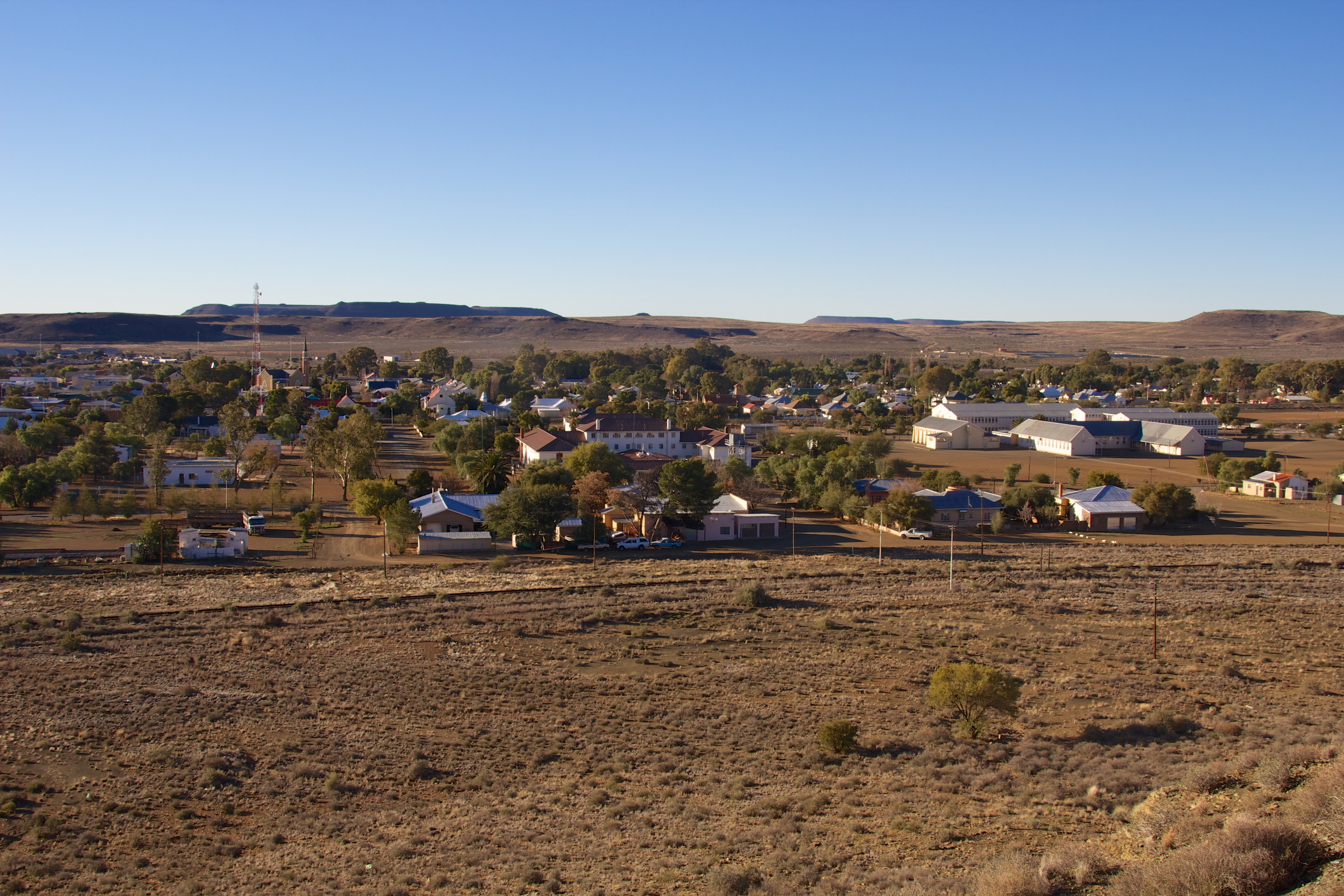
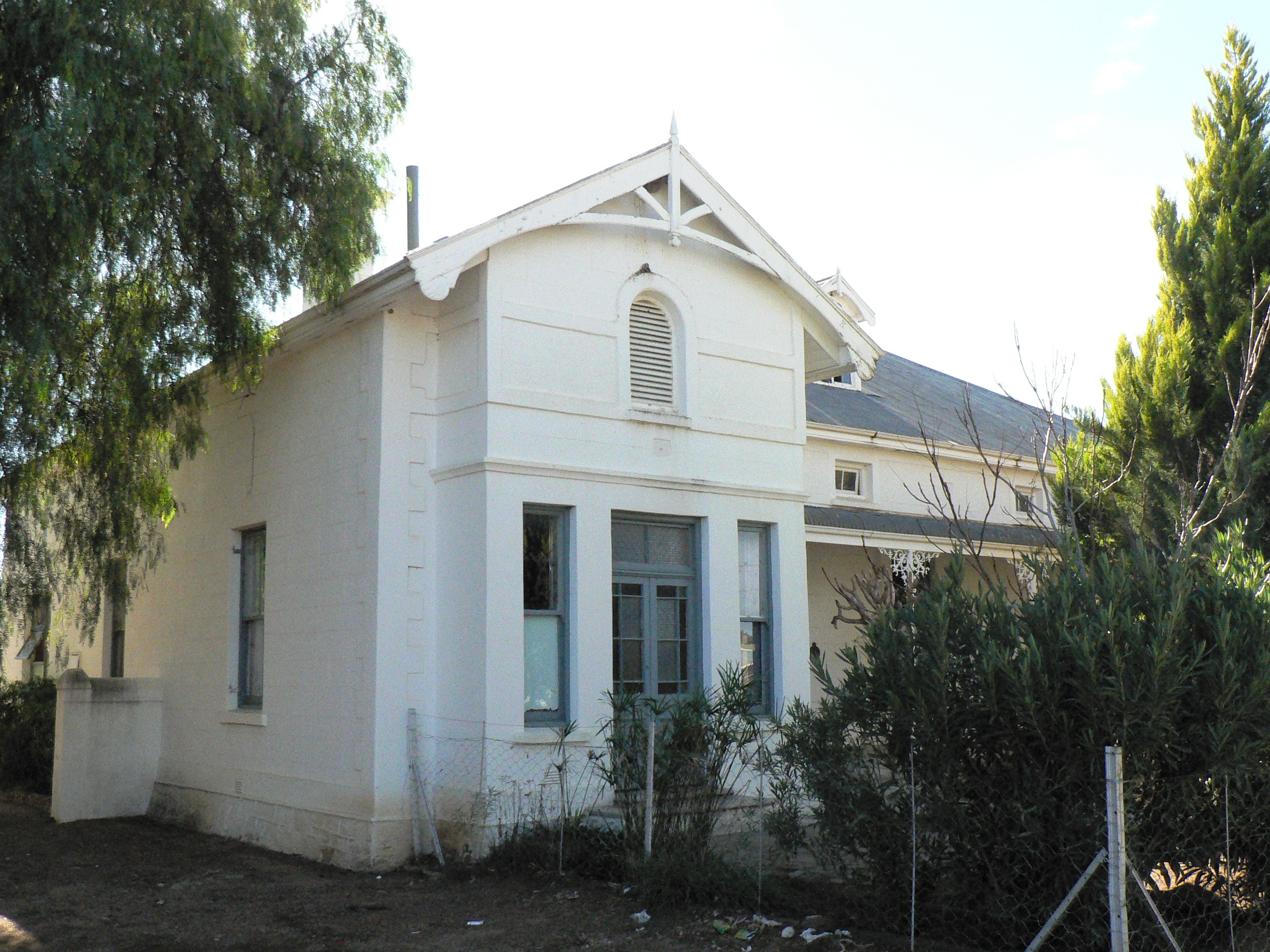
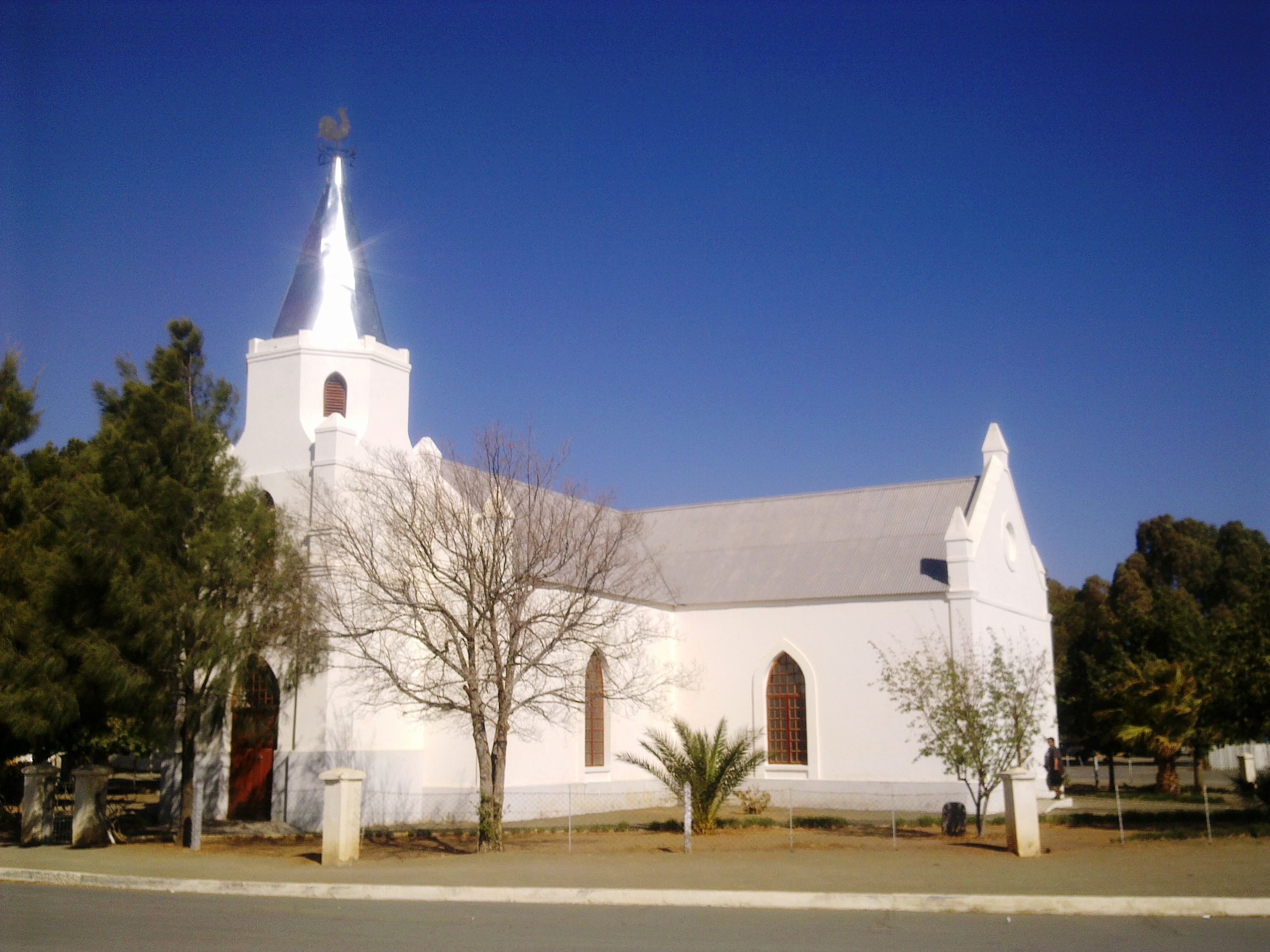
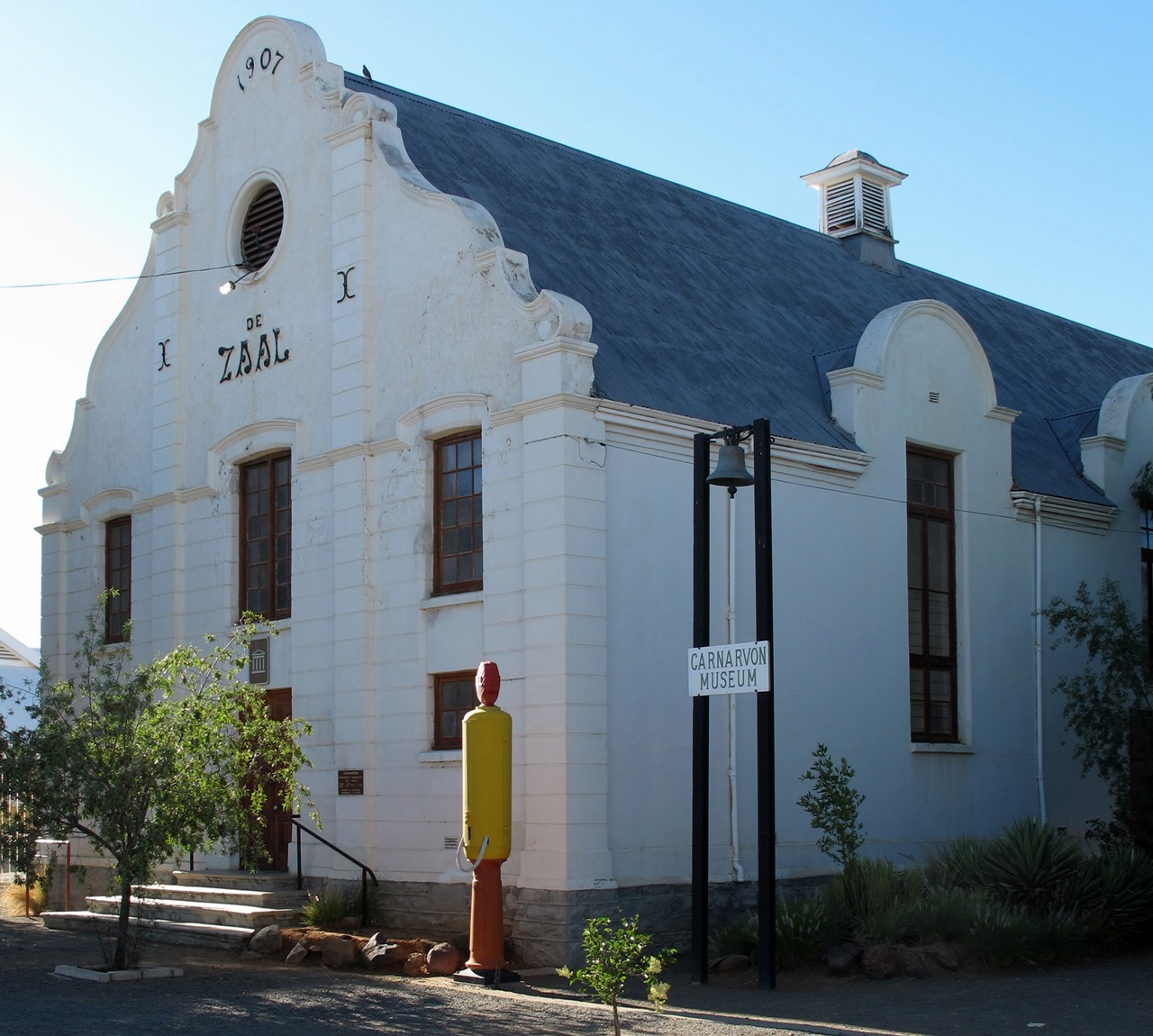
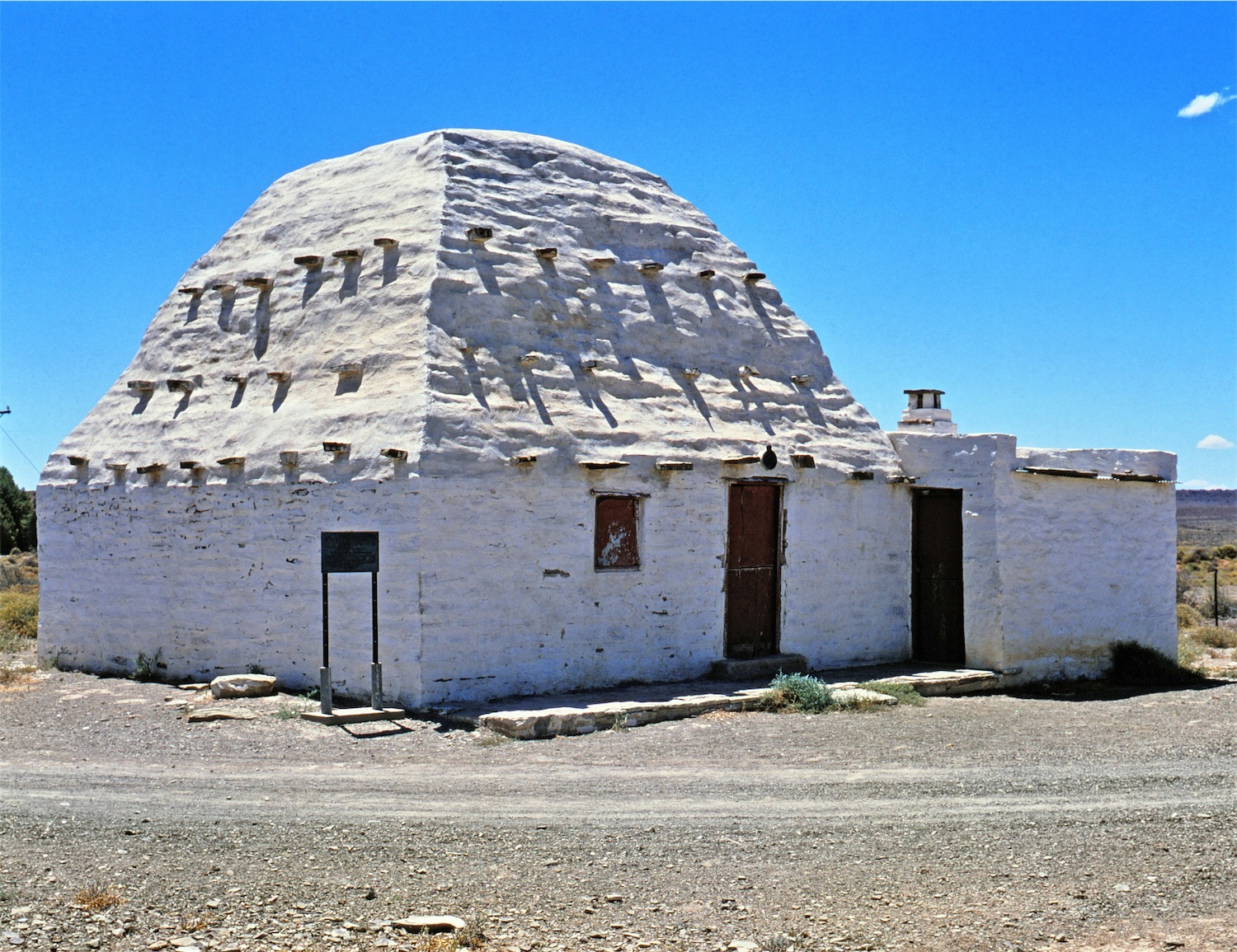
- Top: View of Carnarvon, middle left: Dutch Reformed Misson House, right: Dutch Reformed Church, bottom left: Carnarvon Museum, right: Corbelled House.

- Location within Northern Cape Location within South Africa
- Coordinates: 30°58′S 22°08′E
- Country: South Africa
- Province: Northern Cape
- District: Pixley ka Seme
- Municipality: Kareeberg
- Established: 1853

Area
  - Total: 108.75 km^{2} (41.99 sq mi)
- Elevation: 1,309 m (4,295 ft)

Population (2011)
  - Total: 6,612
  - Density: 60.80/km^{2} (157.5/sq mi)

Racial makeup (2011)
  - Coloured: 86.8%
  - White: 7.6%
  - Black African: 4.8%
  - Indian/Asian: 0.3%
  - Other: 0.5%

First languages (2011)
  - Afrikaans: 96.2%
  - English: 1.6%
  - Other: 2.3%
- Time zone: UTC+2 (SAST)
- Postal code (street): 8925
- PO box: 8925
- Area code: +2753
- Website: http://www.carnarvon.co.za/

Carnarvon is a small town in Pixley ka Seme district of Northern Cape Province in South Africa.

== History ==
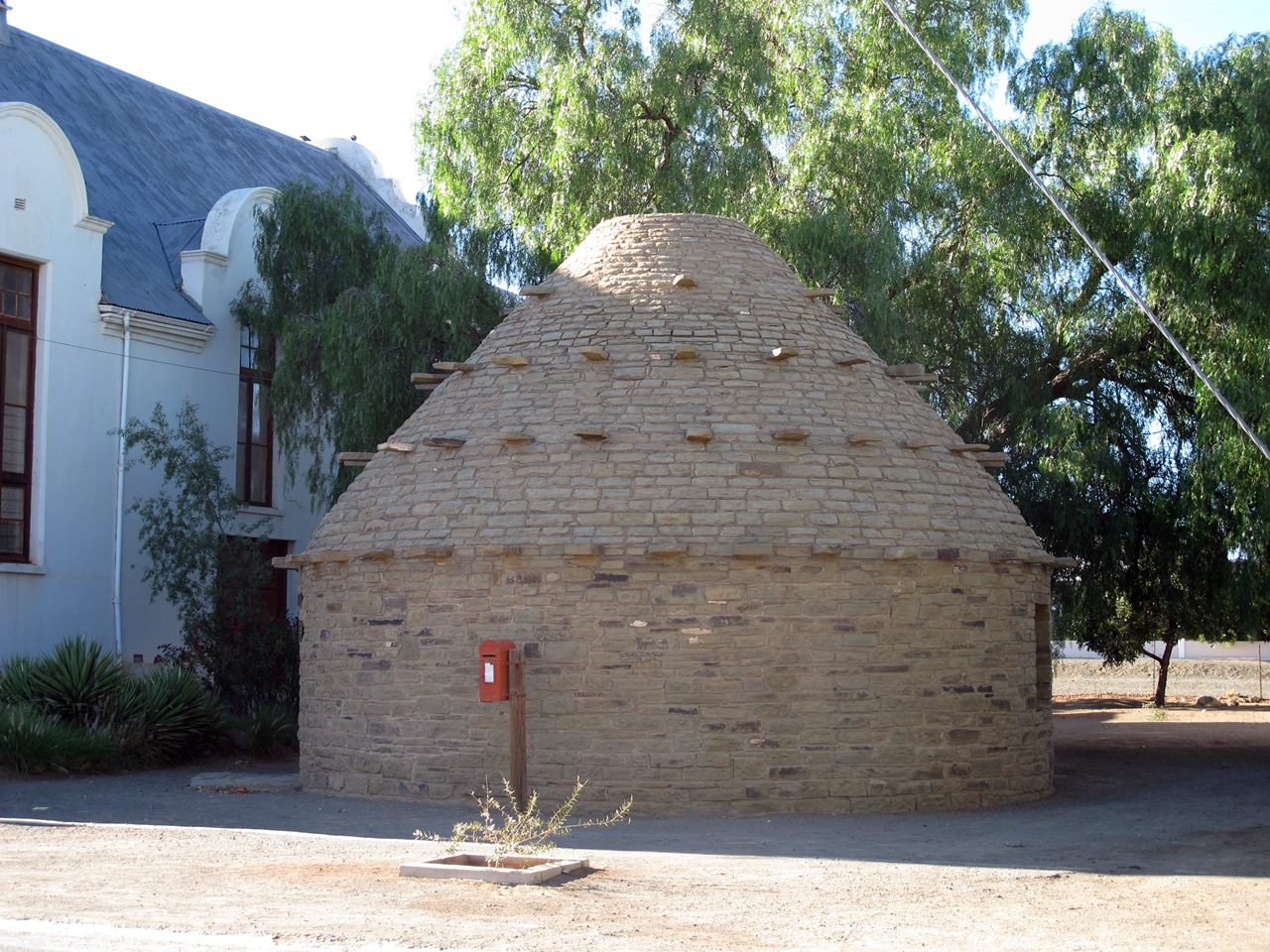
A reconstructed corbelled house in Carnarvon.

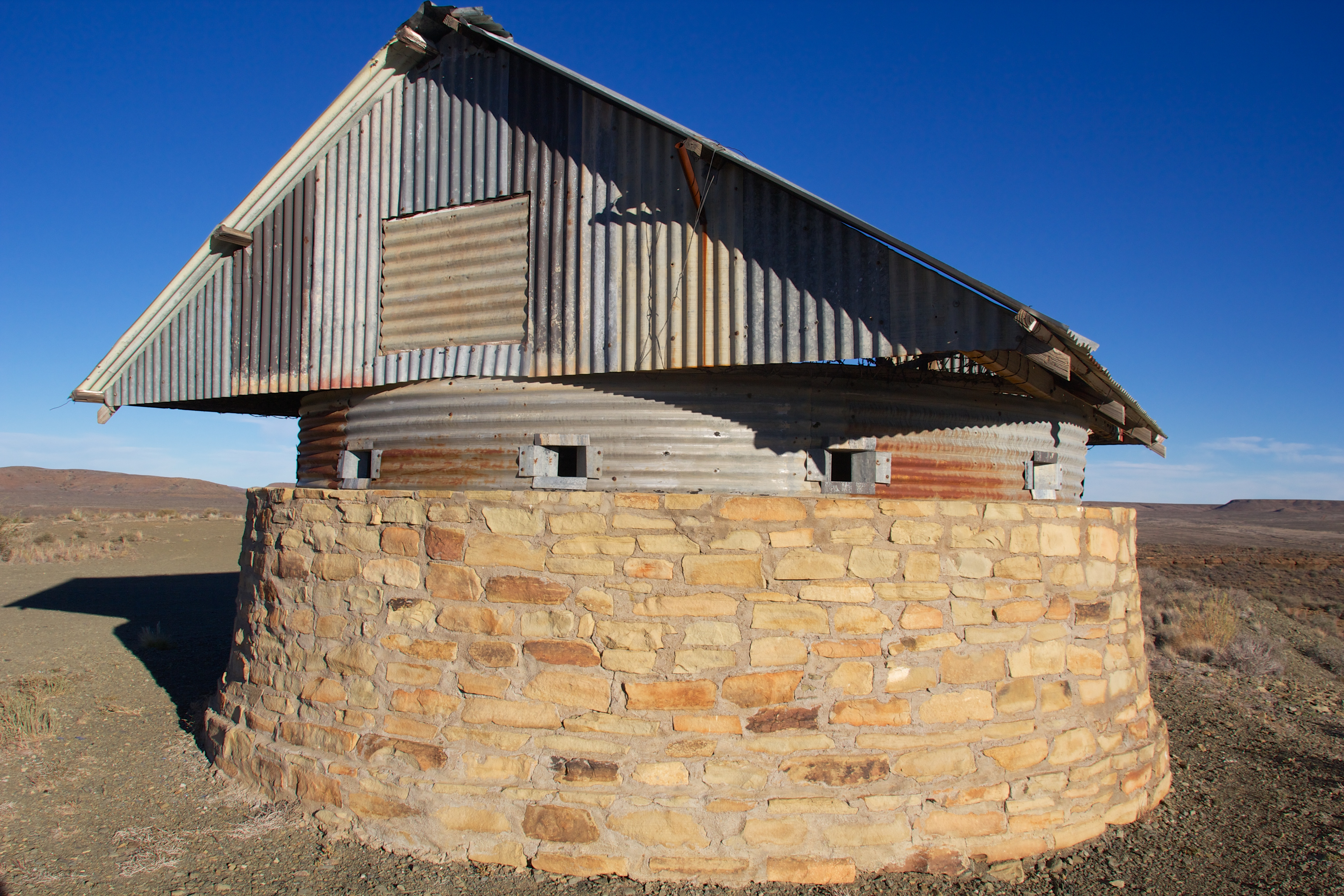
Reconstructed fort overlooking Carnarvon

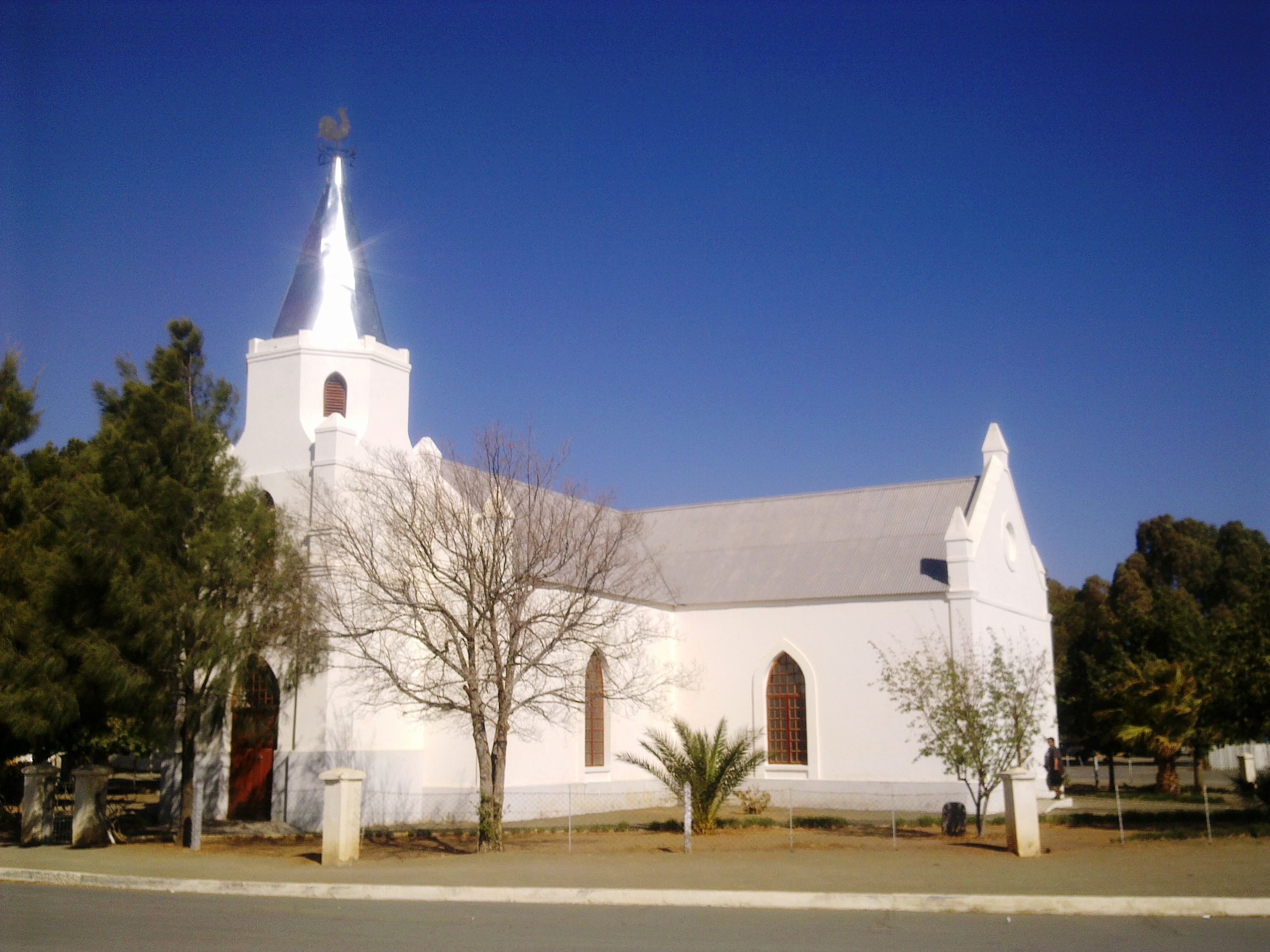
Dutch Reformed Mission Church

Carnarvon was established in 1853 on a route between Cape Town and Botswana that was followed by early explorers and traders. It was originally established as a mission station of the Rhenish Missionary Society and named Harmsfontein. The Rhenish missionaries also established Schietfontein to the west, which later developed into a village. In 1874 Harmsfontein was renamed Carnarvon in honour of the British Colonial Secretary, Lord Carnarvon (1831–1890).

The town is known for its corbelled houses - domed-roof houses constructed from flat stones - which were built between 1811 and 1815.

The Afrikaans poet A.G. Visser had strong associations with Carnarvon, and the house where he lived in the town still stands.

Carnarvon Museum contains exhibits on the region's cultural history. The building was constructed in 1907, and was originally the community hall for the Dutch Reformed Church before being donated to the municipality when a new community centre was constructed in 1973. The museum holds a number of antiques related to the area, including an old hearse previously used by the Dutch Reformed Church. A corbelled house is preserved outside the museum, which was relocated from a nearby farm.

A fort was constructed by the Cape administration on top of the hill that overlooks Carnarvon during the Second Boer War. The hill, now named Koeëlkop (after the Afrikaans word for bullet, koeël), is now used for a water reservoir; the remains of the fort were later rebuilt.

== Population ==
Year	Population	Reference
2001	5235	South African National Census of 2001
2011	6612	South African National Census of 2011

== Economy ==
Carnarvon is a busy farming centre. Its main agricultural activity is [dorper] sheep farming.

The town centre has a Spar and USave store.

=== Square Kilometre Array ===
The MeerKAT radio telescope array is under construction in the Meerkat National Park around 90 km from Carnarvon. The core of the Square Kilometre Array will also be constructed on the same site.

=== Activities ===
- Carnarvon Nature Reserve is home to 11 species of game.
- Carnarvon also has a private tortoise reserve, containing 60 leopard tortoises.

== Transport ==
There are three tarred roads out of Carnarvon. The road west to the picturesque Williston and Calvinia and the road south and then east to Victoria West are numbered as part of the R63 provincial route, while the road east to Britstown is numbered as the R384 regional route.

Carnarvon Airport accommodates light and ultra-light aircraft.

Carnarvon was also served by a station on the branch railway line from Hutchinson to Calvinia, which was closed in 2001.

== Education ==
The modern public library meets the needs of all readers and the local high school is capable of preparing pupils to virtually follow any career path. With a hostel, the school offers accommodation to pupils whose families do not live close to town.

== Religion ==
In 1875, the NG Church was established and the first pastor was Rev. WP de Villiers, pastor of NG Beaufort West. For 30 Years Rev. de Villiers was head of the NG Church. As there were no schools, the pastor, when his duties allowed, and his wife started a teaching school. The first church was built using stone. At a total cost of £12,000 equivalent to £1,197,000 in 2025 the first church was inaugurated in February 1882. But the cornerstone reads: "Deze steen werd gelegd in de naam van die Vader, Zoon en Heilige Geest. 23 September 1880.", stating 23 September 1880 as the inaugurated date. The adult professing NG Church membership was 830 in 1979, 660 in 1999, 468 in 2000, 406 in 2007 and 375 in 2012.
