= Ubuntu Local Municipality =

Ubuntu Oeboentoe, in Afrikaans orthography
- Local municipality
- Location in the Northern Cape
- Coordinates: 31°20′S 23°00′E
- Country: South Africa
- Province: Northern Cape
- District: Pixley ka Seme
- Seat: Victoria West
- Wards: 6

Government
  - Type: Municipal council
  - Mayor: Amelia Kweleta (ANC)

Area
  - Total: 20,389 km^{2} (7,872 sq mi)

Population (2022)
  - Total: 15,836
  - Density: 0.77669/km^{2} (2.0116/sq mi)

Racial makeup (2022)
  - Black African: 20.5%
  - Coloured: 70.0%
  - Indian/Asian: 0.9%
  - White: 8.5%

First languages (2011)
  - Afrikaans: 82.7%
  - Xhosa: 12.5%
  - English: 1.8%
  - Other: 3%
- Time zone: UTC+2 (SAST)
- Municipal code: NC071

Ubuntu Municipality (Afrikaans: Ubuntu Munisipaliteit; Xhosa: uMasipala wase Ubuntu) is a local municipality within the Pixley ka Seme District Municipality, in the Northern Cape province of South Africa. Its seat is Victoria West. Other towns in the municipality are Richmond, Loxton and two small railway villages Hutchinson and Merriman.

== Main places ==
The 2011 census divided the municipality into the following main places:

Place	Code	Area (km^{2})	Population	Most spoken language
Hutchinson	369007	2.0	367	Afrikaans
Loxton	369006	77.6	1,053	Afrikaans
Merriman	369001	0.5	78	Afrikaans
Richmond	369003	82.7	3,793	Afrikaans
Sabelo	369004	0.4	1,329	Xhosa
Victoria West	369005	78.9	8,254	Afrikaans
Remainder	369002	20,147.1	3,727	Afrikaans
Total		20,389.2	18,601	Afrikaans

== Criticism ==
The Ubuntu Municipality has been criticised for illegal traffic fines and harassing motorists.

== Politics ==
The municipal council consists of eleven members elected by mixed-member proportional representation. Six councillors are elected by first-past-the-post voting in six wards, while the remaining five are chosen from party lists so that the total number of party representatives is proportional to the number of votes received. In the election of 1 November 2021 the African National Congress (ANC) won a majority of seven seats.

The following table shows the results of the 2021 election.

Ubuntu local election, 1 November 2021
Party	Votes				Seats		
Party	Ward	List	Total	%	Ward	List	Total
African National Congress	3,515	3,545	7,060	61.5%	6	1	7
Democratic Alliance	1,584	1,756	3,340	29.1%	0	3	3
Freedom Front Plus	218	221	439	3.8%	0	1	1
Economic Freedom Fighters	170	184	354	3.1%	0	0	0
Independent candidates	286	–	286	2.5%	0	–	0
Total	5,773	5,706	11,479		6	5	11
Valid votes	5,773	5,706	11,479	97.8%			
Spoilt votes	94	161	255	2.2%			
Total votes cast	5,867	5,867	11,734				
Voter turnout	5,870						
Registered voters	9,678						
Turnout percentage	60.7%						
