= Umsobomvu Local Municipality =

Umsobomvu
- Local municipality
- Seal

- Location in the Northern Cape
- Coordinates: 30°50′S 25°10′E
- Country: South Africa
- Province: Northern Cape
- District: Pixley ka Seme
- Seat: Colesberg
- Wards: 7

Government
  - Type: Municipal council
  - Mayor: Mzwandile Simon Toto

Area
  - Total: 6,819 km^{2} (2,633 sq mi)

Population (2022)
  - Total: 29,555
  - Density: 4.334/km^{2} (11.23/sq mi)

Racial makeup (2022)
  - Black African: 62.8%
  - Coloured: 31.5%
  - Indian/Asian: 0.5%
  - White: 5.2%

First languages (2011)
  - Xhosa: 55.2%
  - Afrikaans: 38.6%
  - Sotho: 1.9%
  - English: 1.8%
  - Other: 2.5%
- Time zone: UTC+2 (SAST)
- Municipal code: NC072

Umsobomvu Municipality (Xhosa: uMasipala wase Umsobomvu; Afrikaans: Umsobomvu Munisipaliteit) is a local municipality within the Pixley ka Seme District Municipality, in the Northern Cape province of South Africa.

== Main places ==
The 2011 census divided the municipality into the following main places:

Place	Code	Area (km^{2})	Population	Most spoken language
Colesberg	370004	174.8	16,869	Xhosa
Kwazamuxolo	370006	0.7	3,334	Xhosa
Masizakhe	370002	0.1	1,101	Xhosa
Norvalspont	370001	0.8	97	Afrikaans
Noupoort	370005	9.4	4,514	Afrikaans
Remainder	370003	6,632.6	2,461	Afrikaans
Total		6,818.5	28,376	Xhosa

== Politics ==
The municipal council consists of thirteen members elected by mixed-member proportional representation. Seven councillors are elected by first-past-the-post voting in seven wards, while the remaining six are chosen from party lists so that the total number of party representatives is proportional to the number of votes received. In the election of 1 November 2021 the African National Congress (ANC) won a majority of seven seats on the council. The following table shows the results of the election.

Umsobomvu local election, 1 November 2021
Party	Votes				Seats		
Party	Ward	List	Total	%	Ward	List	Total
African National Congress	4,857	4,859	9,716	51.8%	5	2	7
Umsobomvu Residents Association	2,738	2,753	5,491	29.3%	2	2	4
Democratic Alliance	1,163	1,149	2,312	12.3%	0	2	2
Freedom Front Plus	343	335	678	3.6%	0	0	0
Economic Freedom Fighters	177	163	340	1.8%	0	0	0
Patriotic Alliance	101	108	209	1.1%	0	0	0
Independent candidates	1	–	1	0.0%	0	–	0
Total	9,380	9,367	18,747		7	6	13
Valid votes	9,380	9,367	18,747	98.3%			
Spoilt votes	155	161	316	1.7%			
Total votes cast	9,535	9,528	19,063				
Voter turnout	9,543						
Registered voters	14,874						
Turnout percentage	64.2%						
