= Douglas, South Africa =

Douglas
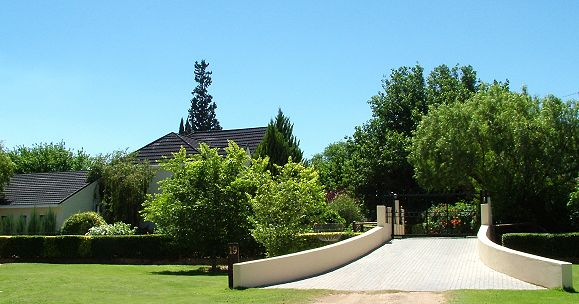
- Douglas suburbia

- Location within Northern Cape Location within South Africa
- Coordinates: 29°03′S 23°46′E
- Country: South Africa
- Province: Northern Cape
- District: Pixley ka Seme
- Municipality: Siyancuma

Area
  - Total: 86.42 km^{2} (33.37 sq mi)
- Elevation: 990 m (3,250 ft)

Population (2011)
  - Total: 20,083
  - Density: 232.4/km^{2} (601.9/sq mi)

Racial makeup (2011)
  - Black African: 32.1%
  - Coloured: 58.3%
  - Indian/Asian: 0.8%
  - White: 8.0%
  - Other: 0.9%

First languages (2011)
  - Afrikaans: 93.1%
  - Tswana: 2.3%
  - English: 1.5%
  - Other: 3.1%
- Time zone: UTC+2 (SAST)
- Postal code (street): 8730
- PO box: 8730
- Area code: 053

Douglas is an agricultural and stock farming town situated near the confluence of the Orange and Vaal rivers in the Northern Cape province of South Africa. Notably the rural town has a diverse population, with mostly state institutions and the anchor private employer, GWK, an agricultural company.

== History ==
The town was founded in 1848 as a mission station on the farm Backhouse by the Reverend Isaac Hughes, who had been working along the Vaal River since 1845. In 1867, a group of Europeans from Griquatown signed an agreement giving them the right to establish a town. The town was named after General Sir Percy Douglas, Lieutenant Governor of the Cape Colony.

== Geography ==
Douglas lies about 100 km southwest of Kimberley, the capital of the Northern Cape. These two are connected by the R357 road.

=== Climate ===
Douglas has a record of its elevation above sea level of 1030.22 meters (3379.99 feet). Comparing Douglas district's yearly temperature to South Africa's averages, the records show that it is 4.01% higher with a temperature 25.23 °C (77.41 °F). Douglas is known for its Subtropical desert climate with 38.78 rainy days (10.62% of the time) and precipitation of about 19.31 millimeters (0.76 inches) annually.

== Notable people from Douglas ==
- Ingrid Jonker, poet
- Dirk de Villiers, filmmaker
