= Siyancuma Local Municipality =

Siyancuma
- Local municipality
- Red mountains north of N8

- Seal

- Location in the Northern Cape
- Coordinates: 29°0′S 23°30′E
- Country: South Africa
- Province: Northern Cape
- District: Pixley ka Seme
- Seat: Douglas
- Wards: 7

Government
  - Type: Municipal council
  - Mayor: Patrick McKlein (ANC)

Area
  - Total: 16,753 km^{2} (6,468 sq mi)

Population (2022)
  - Total: 53,165
  - Density: 3.1735/km^{2} (8.2192/sq mi)

Racial makeup (2022)
  - Black African: 30.4%
  - Coloured: 58.2%
  - Indian/Asian: 0.7%
  - White: 10.5%

First languages (2011)
  - Afrikaans: 88.9%
  - Tswana: 5.1%
  - English: 1.3%
  - Other: 3.7%
- Time zone: UTC+2 (SAST)
- Municipal code: NC078

Siyancuma Municipality (Afrikaans: Siyancuma Munisipaliteit) is a local municipality within the Pixley ka Seme District Municipality, in the Northern Cape province of South Africa.

== Main places ==
The 2001 census divided the municipality into the following main places:

Place	Code	Area (km^{2})	Population	Most spoken language
Breipaal	31401	1.40	8,533	Afrikaans
Campbell	31402	78.42	1,763	Afrikaans
Douglas	31403	73.29	6,946	Afrikaans
Griekwastad	31404	77.09	3,952	Afrikaans
Mathlomola	31405	0.18	1,265	Afrikaans
Ritchie	31406	140.31	953	Afrikaans
Schmidtsdrift	31407	22.75	3,243	
Remainder of the municipality	31408	9,634.35	9,152	Afrikaans

== Politics ==
The municipal council consists of thirteen members elected by mixed-member proportional representation. Seven councillors are elected by first-past-the-post voting in seven wards, while the remaining six are chosen from party lists so that the total number of party representatives is proportional to the number of votes received. In the election of 1 November 2021 no party obtained a majority of seats on the council. The following table shows the results of the election.

Siyancuma local election, 1 November 2021
Party	Votes				Seats		
Party	Ward	List	Total	%	Ward	List	Total
African National Congress	5,032	5,340	10,372	52.1%	5	1	6
Democratic Alliance	2,040	2,954	4,994	25.1%	0	3	3
Independent candidates	2,227	–	2,227	11.2%	2	–	2
Freedom Front Plus	458	787	1,245	6.3%	0	1	1
Economic Freedom Fighters	422	640	1,062	5.3%	0	1	1
Total	10,179	9,721	19,900		7	6	13
Valid votes	10,179	9,721	19,900	95.8%			
Spoilt votes	214	664	878	4.2%			
Total votes cast	10,393	10,385	20,778				
Voter turnout	10,443						
Registered voters	19,436						
Turnout percentage	53.7%						
