= Emthanjeni Local Municipality =

Emthanjeni
- Local municipality
- Seal

- Location in the Northern Cape
- Coordinates: 30°40′S 24°0′E
- Country: South Africa
- Province: Northern Cape
- District: Pixley ka Seme
- Seat: De Aar
- Wards: 8

Government
  - Type: Municipal council
  - Mayor: Boy Kenneth Markman

Area
  - Total: 13,472 km^{2} (5,202 sq mi)

Population (2022)
  - Total: 46,587
  - Density: 3.4581/km^{2} (8.9563/sq mi)

Racial makeup (2022)
  - Black African: 32.0%
  - Coloured: 59.9%
  - Indian/Asian: 0.8%
  - White: 7.3%

First languages (2011)
  - Afrikaans: 70.3%
  - Xhosa: 23.8%
  - English: 2.3%
  - Other: 3.6%
- Time zone: UTC+2 (SAST)
- Municipal code: NC073
- Website: emthanjeni.co.za

Emthanjeni Municipality (Afrikaans: Emthanjeni Munisipaliteit; Xhosa: uMasipala wase Emthanjeni) is a local municipality within the Pixley ka Seme District Municipality, in the Northern Cape province of South Africa. Emthanjeni is a Xhosa word meaning "vein", symbolising the importance of an underground water supply system to the area. It is also a translation of the name of the municipality's seat, De Aar.

== Main places ==
The 2011 census divided the municipality into the following main places:

Place	Code	Area (km^{2})	Population	Most spoken language
Britstown	371002	61.47	3,843	Afrikaans
De Aar	371004	84.23	23,760	Afrikaans
Hanover	371006	80.77	4,594	Afrikaans
Mziwabantu	371001	1,08	1,302	Xhosa/Afrikaans
Nonzwakazi	371005	1.27	6,230	Xhosa
Remainder of the municipality	371003	13,243.48	2,626	Afrikaans

== Demographics ==
According to the 2022 South African census, the population of the municipality was 46,587 people. Of these, 59.9% identified as "Coloured," 32.0% as "Black African," and 7.3% as "White."

== Politics ==
The municipal council consists of fifteen members elected by mixed-member proportional representation. Eight councillors are elected by first-past-the-post voting in eight wards, while the remaining seven are chosen from party lists so that the total number of party representatives is proportional to the number of votes received. In the election of 1 November 2021 the African National Congress (ANC) won a majority of nine seats on the council.

The following table shows the results of the election.

Emthanjeni local election, 1 November 2021
Party	Votes				Seats		
Party	Ward	List	Total	%	Ward	List	Total
African National Congress	6,784	6,809	13,593	60.3%	7	2	9
Democratic Alliance	2,932	3,055	5,987	26.6%	1	3	4
Economic Freedom Fighters	484	548	1,032	4.6%	0	1	1
Patriotic Alliance	380	608	988	4.4%	0	1	1
Freedom Front Plus	260	294	554	2.5%	0	0	0
Independent candidates	386	–	386	1.7%	0	–	0
Total	11,226	11,314	22,540		8	7	15
Valid votes	11,226	11,314	22,540	98.5%			
Spoilt votes	178	157	335	1.5%			
Total votes cast	11,404	11,471	22,875				
Voter turnout	11,566						
Registered voters	22,544						
Turnout percentage	51.3%						
