= Pixley ka Seme District Municipality =

District of Northern Cape, South Africa

Pixley ka Seme
- District municipality
- Seal

- Location in South Africa
- Coordinates: 30°30′S 23°30′E
- Country: South Africa
- Province: Northern Cape
- Seat: De Aar
- Local municipalities: List: Ubuntu; Umsobomvu; Emthanjeni; Kareeberg; Renosterberg; Thembelihle; Siyathemba; Siyancuma

Government
  - Type: Municipal council
  - Mayor: Rhoode Itumeleng

Area
  - Total: 103,410 km^{2} (39,930 sq mi)

Population (2022)
  - Total: 216,589
  - Density: 2.0945/km^{2} (5.4246/sq mi)

Racial makeup (2022)
  - Black African: 29.8%
  - Coloured: 59.5%
  - Indian/Asian: 0.8%
  - White: 9.9%

First languages (2011)
  - Afrikaans: 76.8%
  - Xhosa: 17.5%
  - English: 1.6%
  - Tswana: 1.6%
  - Other: 2.5%
- Time zone: UTC+2 (SAST)
- Municipal code: DC7

The Pixley ka Seme District Municipality (Afrikaans: Pixley ka Seme-distriksmunisipaliteit; Xhosa: uMasipala weSithili sase Pixley ka Seme) is one of the five districts of the Northern Cape province of South Africa. The seat of Pixley ka Seme is De Aar. As of 2011, a majority (77%) of its 186,351 residents speak Afrikaans as a first language. The district code is DC7. It is named after Pixley ka Isaka Seme, one of the founders of the African National Congress.

== Geography ==
=== Neighbours ===
Pixley ka Seme is surrounded by other districts as follows:

=== Local municipalities ===
The district contains the following local municipalities:

Local municipality	Population (2022)	%	Dominant language
Emthanjeni	46,587	21,5	Afrikaans
Siyancuma	54,165	25.1	Afrikaans
Umsobomvu	29,555	13.6	Xhosa
Siyathemba	27,105	12.5	Afrikaans
Ubuntu	15,836	7.3	Afrikaans
Thembelihle	22,542	10.4	Afrikaans
Kareeberg	10,961	5.0	Afrikaans
Renosterberg	10,843	5.0	Afrikaans

== Demographics ==
The following statistics are from the 2011 and 2022 census.

Language	Population (2011)	%
Afrikaans	140,641	76.79%
IsiXhosa	32,017	17.48%
English	2,991	1.63%
Tswana	2,922	1.60%
Sesotho	1,483	0.81%
Other	941	0.51%
Sign language	745	0.41%
IsiZulu	446	0.24%
IsiNdebele	298	0.16%
Sepedi	286	0.16%
Tshivenda	171	0.09%
Xitsonga	108	0.06%
SiSwati	104	0.06%

=== Gender ===
Gender	Population (2011)	%	Population (2022)	%
Female	94,284	50.59	112 051	51.7
Male	92,068	49.41	104 538	48.3

=== Ethnic group ===
Ethnic group	Population (2011)	%	Population (2022)	%
Coloured	110,257	59.17	128,789	59.5
Black African	58,614	31.45	64,461	29.8
White	15,064	8.08	21,436	9.9
Indian/Asian	1,046	0.56	1,696	0.8
Other	1,371	0.74	185	0.1

=== Age ===
Age	Population (2011)	%	Population (2022)	%
000–004	17 114	10.40	20 952	9.6
005–009	17 869	10.86	20 150	9.3
010–014	18 744	11.39	20 753	9.5
015–019	17 638	10.72	20 513	9.5
020–024	12 796	7.77	18 367	8.5
025–029	11 970	7.27	17 053	7.9
030–034	11 858	7.20	16 184	7.5
035–039	10 997	6.68	15 138	7.0
040–044	9 664	5.87	12 942	6.0
045–049	8 761	5.32	11 261	5.2
050–054	7 090	4.31	11 066	5.2
055–059	5 581	3.39	9 733	4.5
060–064	4 720	2.87	7 933	3.7
065–069	3 733	2.27	6 148	2.8
070–074	2 488	1.51	3 948	1.8
075–079	1 692	1.03	2 329	1.1
080–084	1 123	0.68	1 205	0.6
085–089	489	0.30	845 (85+)	0.4
090–094	217	0.13	-	-
095–099	51	0.03	-	-
100 plus	13	0.01	-	-

== Politics ==
=== Election results ===
Election results for Pixley ka Seme in the South African general election, 2004.

- Population 18 and over: 99 868 [60.67% of total population]
- Total votes: 66 585 [40.45% of total population]
- Voting % estimate: 66.67% votes as a % of population 18 and over

Party	Votes	%
African National Congress	43 618	65.51%
New National Party	8 730	13.11%
Democratic Alliance	7 067	10.61%
Independent Democrats	3 298	4.95%
Freedom Front Plus	1 225	1.84%
African Christian Democratic Party	1 154	1.73%
Pan Africanist Congress	305	0.46%
United Democratic Movement	240	0.36%
Inkatha Freedom Party	136	0.20%
NA	110	0.17%
PJC	105	0.16%
United Christian Democratic Party	104	0.16%
Azanian People's Organisation	97	0.15%
EMSA	71	0.11%
TOP	63	0.09%
NLP	60	0.09%
KISS	50	0.08%
SOPA	50	0.08%
CDP	43	0.06%
UF	43	0.06%
Minority Front	16	0.02%
Total	66 585	100.00%

== See also ==
- Karoo a general geographical area in South Africa
