= List of power stations in South Africa =

South Africa produced around 245,000 GWh of electricity in 2021. Most of this electricity is produced using coal and is consumed domestically. In 2022, 12,300 GWh were exported to Eswatini, Botswana, Mozambique, Lesotho, Namibia, Zambia, Zimbabwe and other countries participating in the Southern African Power Pool. In 2022, South Africa imported 10,800 GWh from the Cahora Bassa Hydroelectric Power Station in Mozambique via the 1,920 MW Cahora Bassa (HDVC) Power Transmission System.

Most power stations in South Africa are owned and operated by the state owned enterprise Eskom. These plants account for 86% of the total electricity produced in South Africa and ~20% of all electricity produced on the African continent. In terms of share of GDP in 2012, South Africa was the 4th largest investor in renewable power in the world after Uruguay, Mauritius and Costa Rica.

The following is a list of electricity-generating facilities in South Africa larger than 1 MW in capacity. It includes operational facilities and facilities under constructinon only. The net power output in megawatts is listed, indicating the maximum power that the power station can deliver to the grid.

For notable facilities that are not operating, or have been decommissioned, see List of decommissioned power stations in South Africa.

South African energy grid capacity
Type	Capacity (MW)
Coal	45,618
OCGT	3,449
Wind	3,562
Hydro	2,290
Nuclear	1,860
Solar PV	1,717
Solar CSP	400
Biomass	71
Landfill gas	26.5
Total capacity	58,753

South Africa's power generation by type of energy (2025)
1. Coal (58.0%)
2. Rooftop Solar (10.0%)
3. Grid-connected Solar (10.0%)
4. Wind (8.00%)
5. Diesel (4.50%)
6. Hydro (4.00%)
7. Nuclear (2.50%)
8. Other (4.00%)

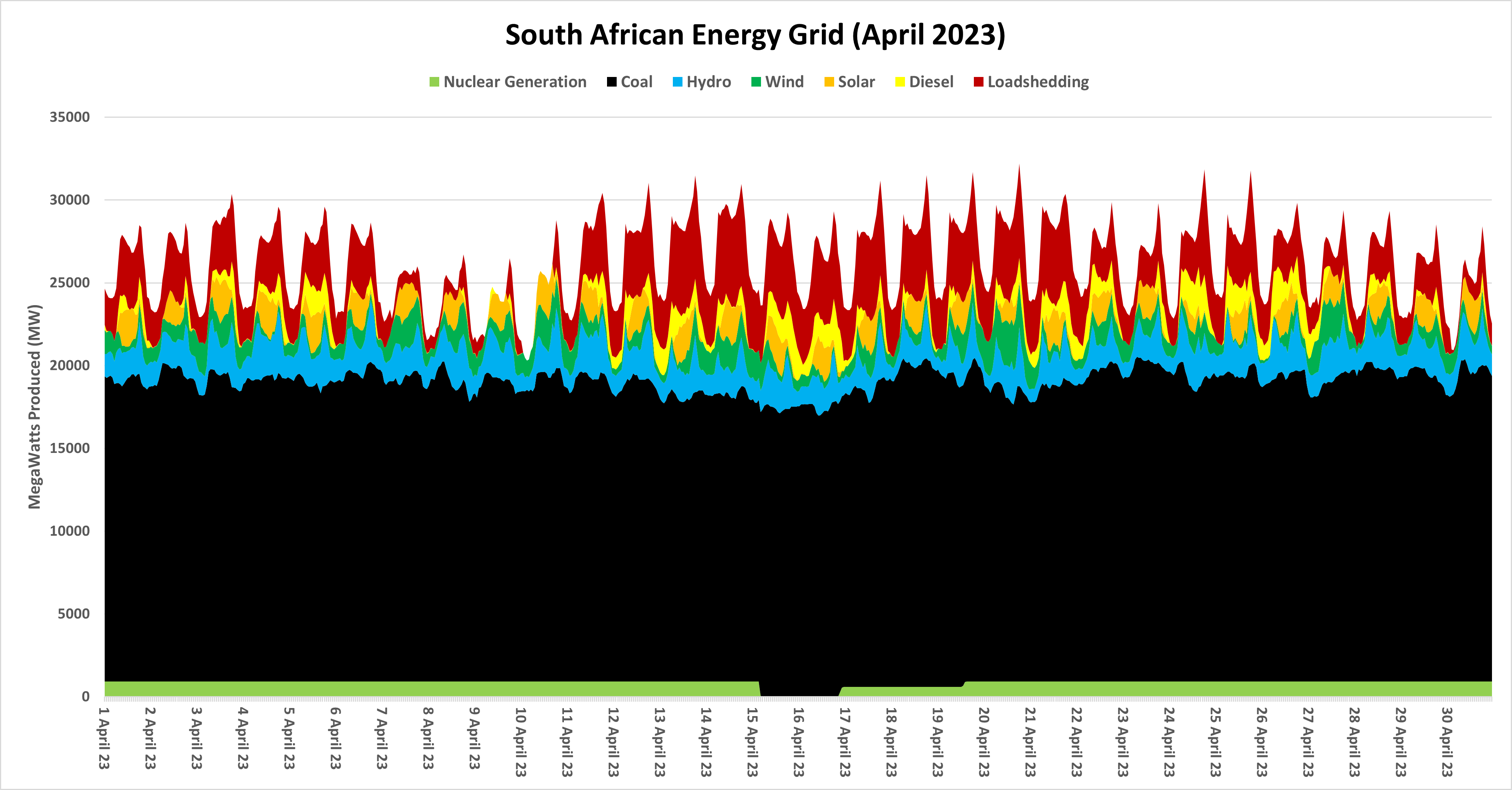
Eskom nation grid production by source in April 2023

== Coal ==
South Africa is the world's seventh biggest coal producer and has rich coal deposits concentrated in the north-east of the country. As such, the majority of South Africa's coal-fired plants are located in the Mpumalanga province. Around 81% of South Africa's energy needs are directly derived from coal and 81% of all coal consumed domestically goes towards electricity production. Historically this has given South Africa access to cheap electricity, but it is also one of the leading reasons that the country is in the top 20 list of carbon dioxide emitting countries.

Power plant	Province	Coordinates	Total capacity MW	Date commissioned (planned)	Planned date of decommissionning	Operator	Notes
Arnot Power Station	MP	25°56′38″S 29°47′22″E	2,352	1971–1975	2025–2029	Eskom	
Camden Power Station	MP	26°37′13″S 30°05′38″E	1,561	1967–1969; 2005–2008	2020–2023	Eskom	
Duvha Power Station	MP	25°57′50″S 29°20′14″E	3,600	1980–1984	2030–2034	Eskom	
Grootvlei Power Station	MP	26°46′S 28°30′E	1,180	1969–1977; 2008–2011	2025–2028	Eskom	Units 5 and 6 were the first test facilities for dry cooling in South Africa.
Hendrina Power Station	MP	26°01′59″S 29°36′00″E	1,893	1970–1976	2021–2027	Eskom	
Kelvin Power Station	GP	26°06′58″S 28°11′38″E	420	1957	2026	Aldwych International	Nameplate capacity: 420 MW
Kendal Power Station	MP	26°05′24″S 28°58′17″E	4,116	1988–1992	2038–2043	Eskom	Dry cooled; the largest dry-cooled power station in the world.
Komati Power Station	MP	26°05′24″S 29°28′19″E	1,000	1961–1966; 2009–2013	2022 (currently decommissioned)	Eskom	
Kriel Power Station	MP	26°15′15″S 29°10′46″E	3,000	1976–1979	2026–2029	Eskom	
Kusile Power Station	MP	25°54′59″S 28°55′02″E	4,800	(2022–2024)		Eskom	Under construction; 4/6 units operational. Dry cooled (planned: 4,800 MW).
Lethabo Power Station	FS	26°44′31″S 27°58′39″E	3,708	1985–1990	2035–2040	Eskom	
Majuba Power Station	MP	27°06′02″S 29°46′17″E	4,110	1996–2001	2046–2050	Eskom	3 units dry cooled (0.2 l/kWh), 3 units wet cooled (2.0 l/kWh)
Matimba Power Station	LP	23°40′06″S 27°36′38″E	3,990	1987–1991	2037–2041	Eskom	Dry-cooled
Matla Power Station	MP	26°16′57″S 29°08′27″E	3,600	1979–1983	2029–2033	Eskom	
Medupi Power Station	LP	23°42′S 27°33′E	4,800	2021		Eskom	Constructed; 5/6 units operational due to unit 4 explosion. Dry cooled (planned: 4,764 MW).
Pretoria West Power Station	GP	25°45′28″S 28°08′49″E	180	1952	2016	City of Tshwane	Nameplate capacity: 190 MW
Rooiwal Power Station	GP	25°33′21″S 28°14′18″E	300	1963	2025	City of Tshwane	Nameplate capacity: 600 MW
Tutuka Power Station	MP	26°46′43″S 29°21′07″E	3,654	1985–1990	2035–2040	Eskom	
		Total:	48,264				

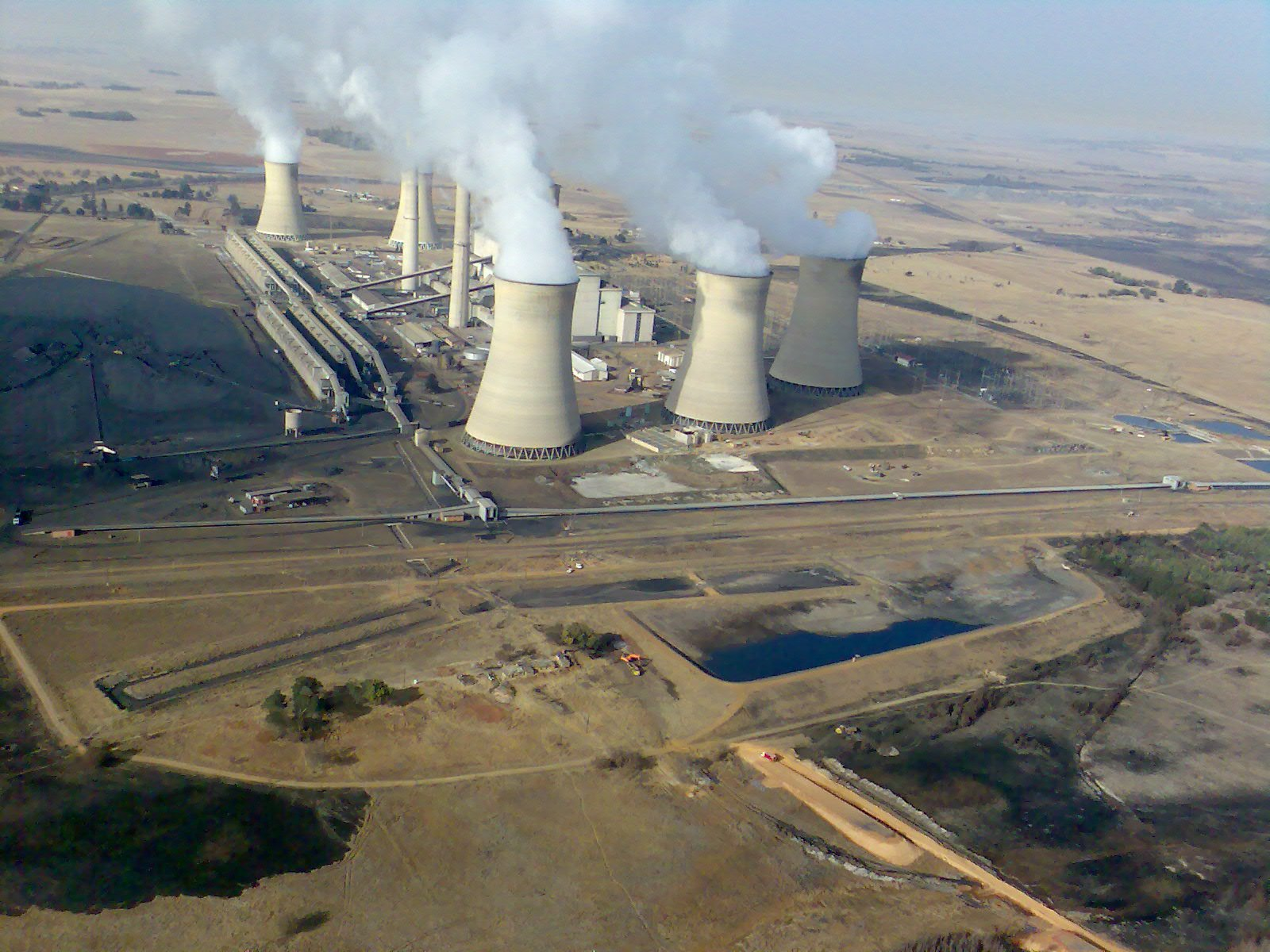
Arnot Power Station

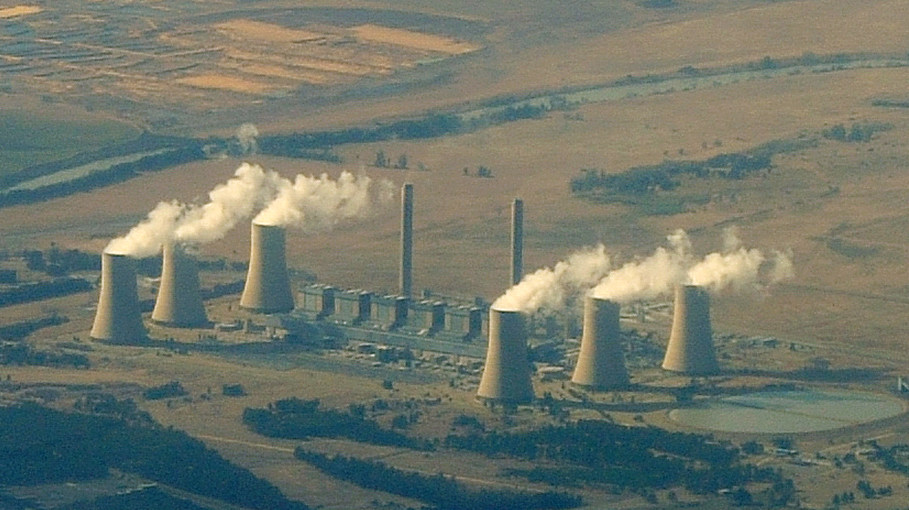
Lethabo Power Station

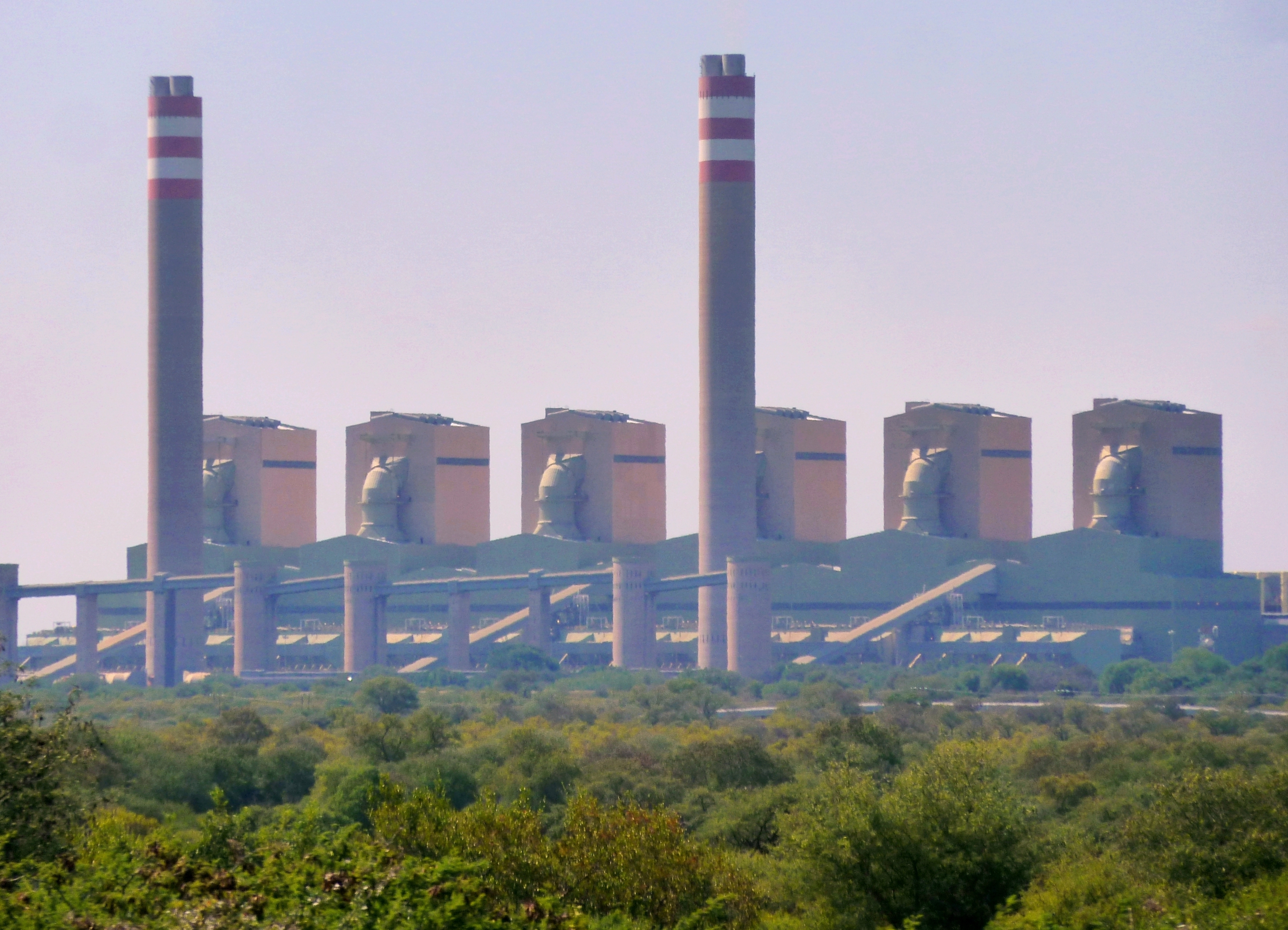
Matimba Power Station

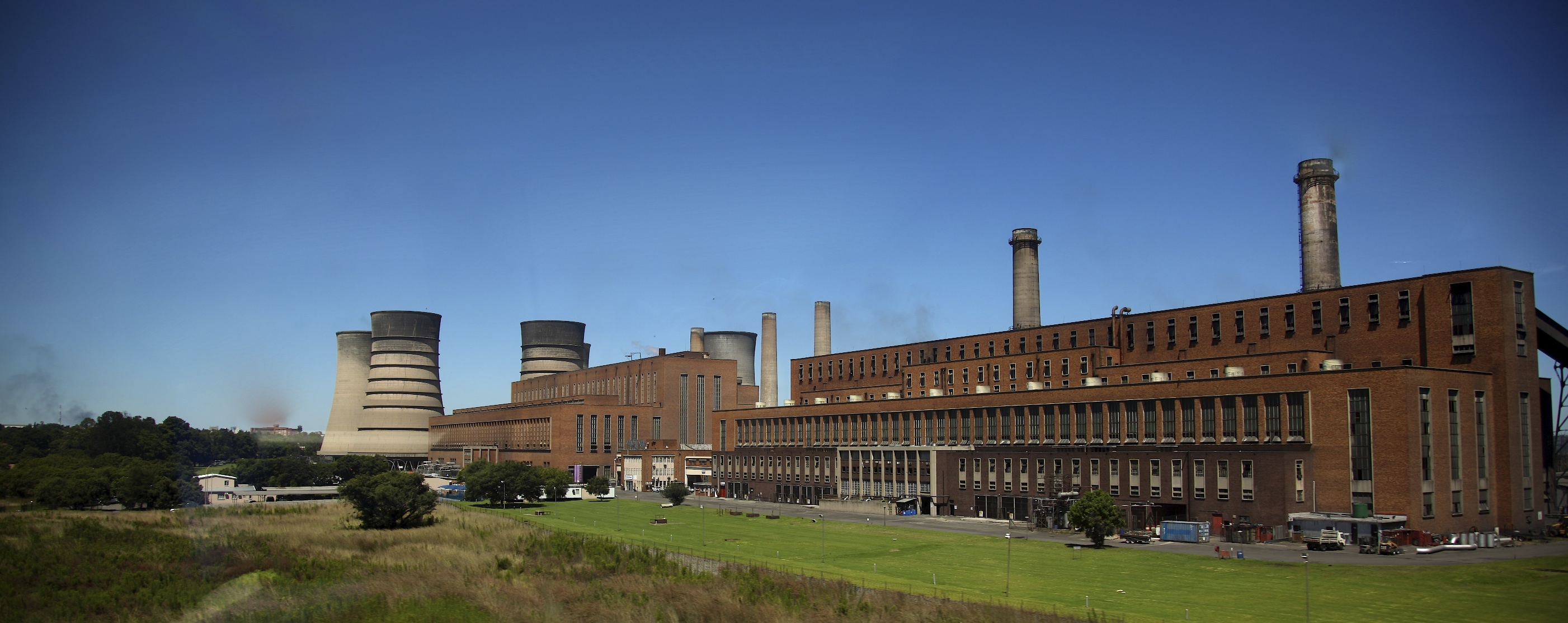
Kelvin Power Station

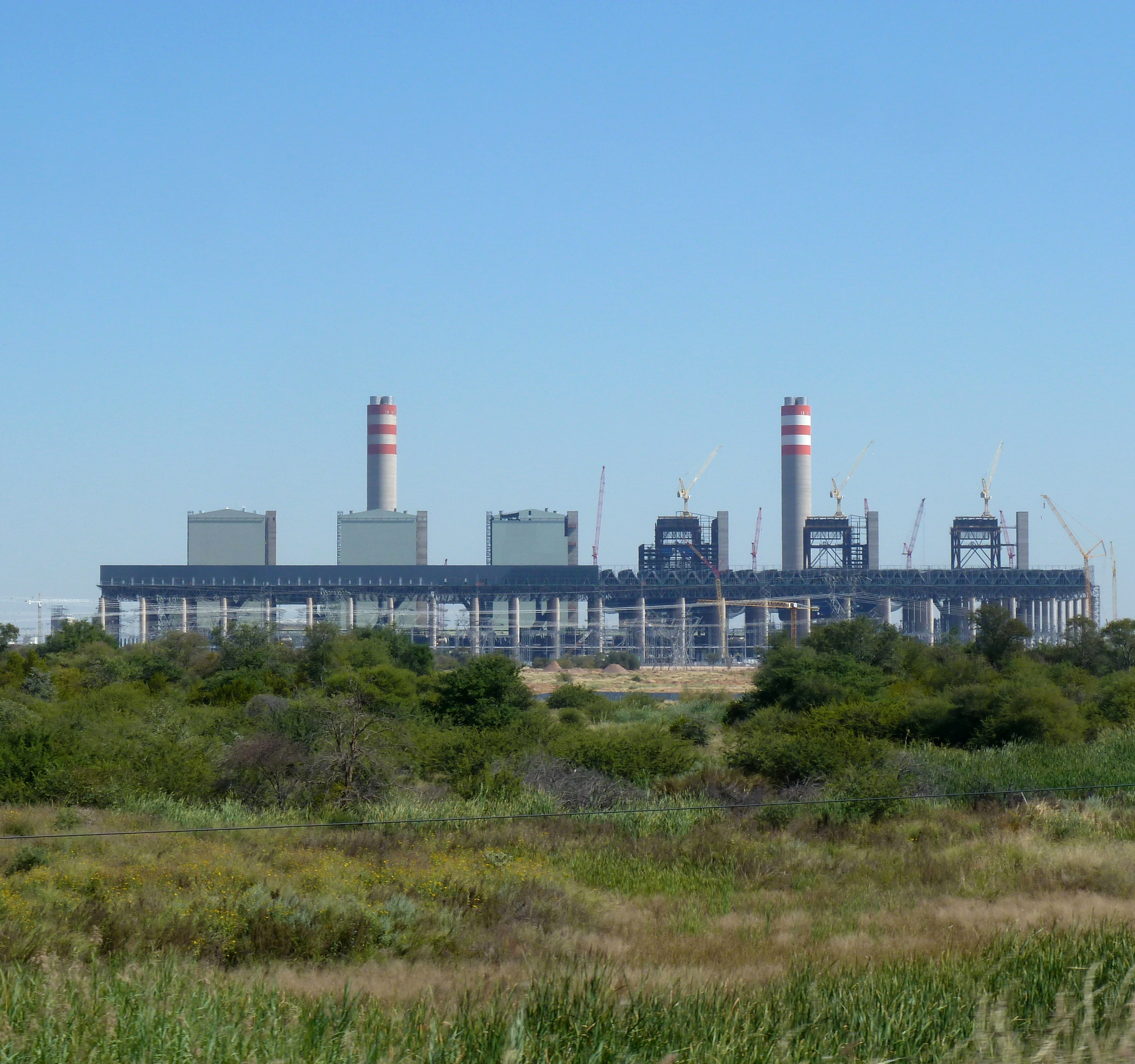
Medupi Power Station

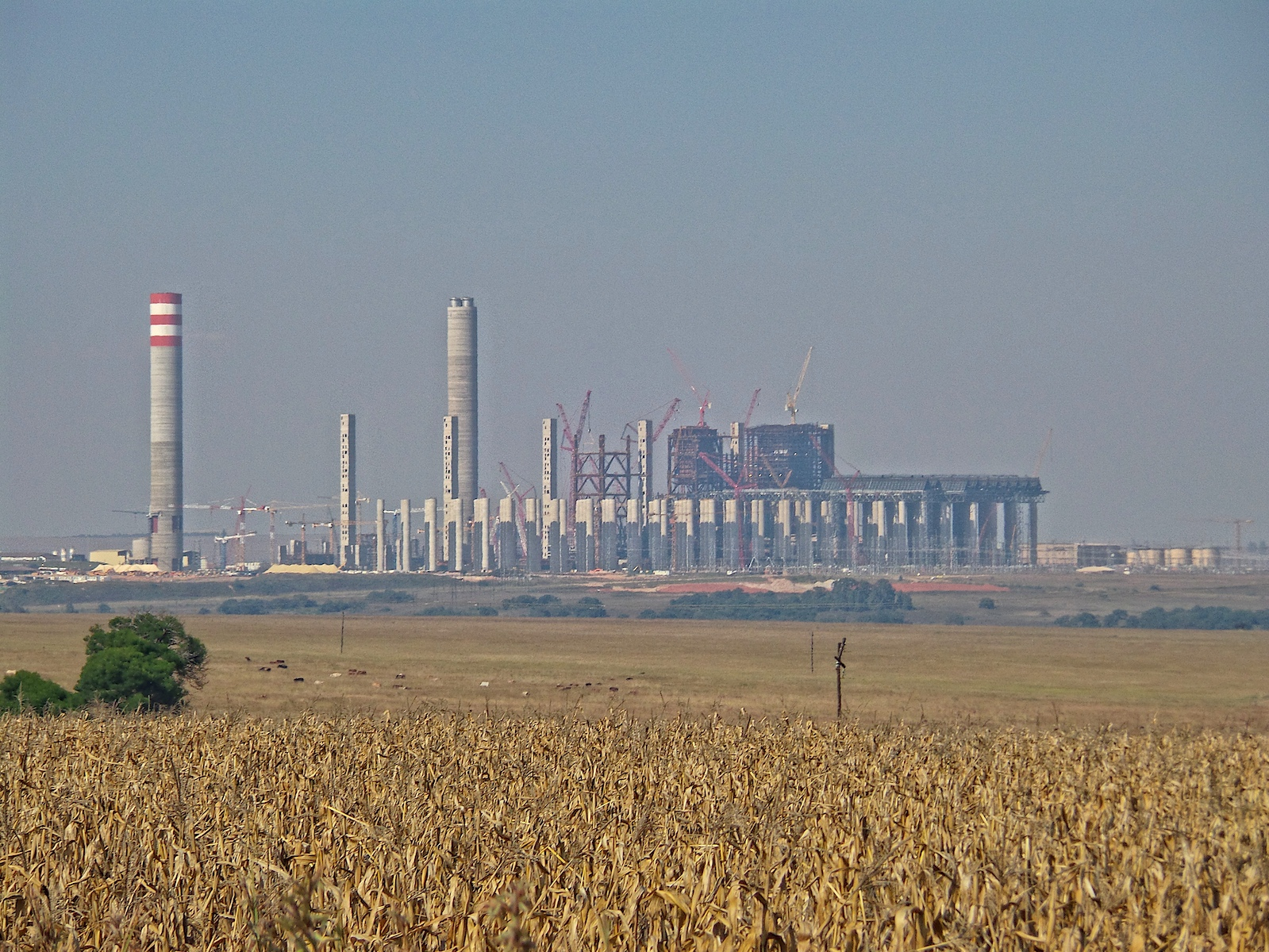
Kusile Power Station

== Open cycle gas turbine (OCGT) ==
Power plant	Province	Coordinates	Installed capacity (MW)	Date commissioned	Operator	Notes
Acacia Power Station	WC	33°53′00″S 18°32′08″E	171	1976	Eskom	3× 57 MW
Ankerlig Power Station	WC	33°35′32″S 18°27′37″E	1,327	2007	Eskom	4× 148 MW 5× 147 MW
Gourikwa Power Station	WC	34°10′00″S 21°57′38″E	740	2007	Eskom	5× 148 MW
Newcastle Cogeneration Plant	KZN	27°47′08″S 29°58′11″E	18	2007	IPSA Group	1× 18 MW
Port Rex Power Station	EC	33°01′43″S 27°52′52″E	171	1976	Eskom	3× 57 MW
Avon Peaking Power	KZN	29°25′10″S 31°09′41″E	670	2016	Engie Energy	4× 167.5 MW
Dedisa Peaking Power	EC	33°44′33″S 25°40′22″E	335	2015	Engie Energy	R3.5 billion (2015) 2× 167.5 MW
		Total:	3,432			27 OCGT units

== Natural gas ==
Power plant	Province	Installed capacity (MW)	Commissioned
Richards Bay Gas Power Plant	KZN	3000	2030
	Total	3000	

== Pumped storage ==
For a more complete list of hydro power stations from large to pico size, see the African hydropower database.

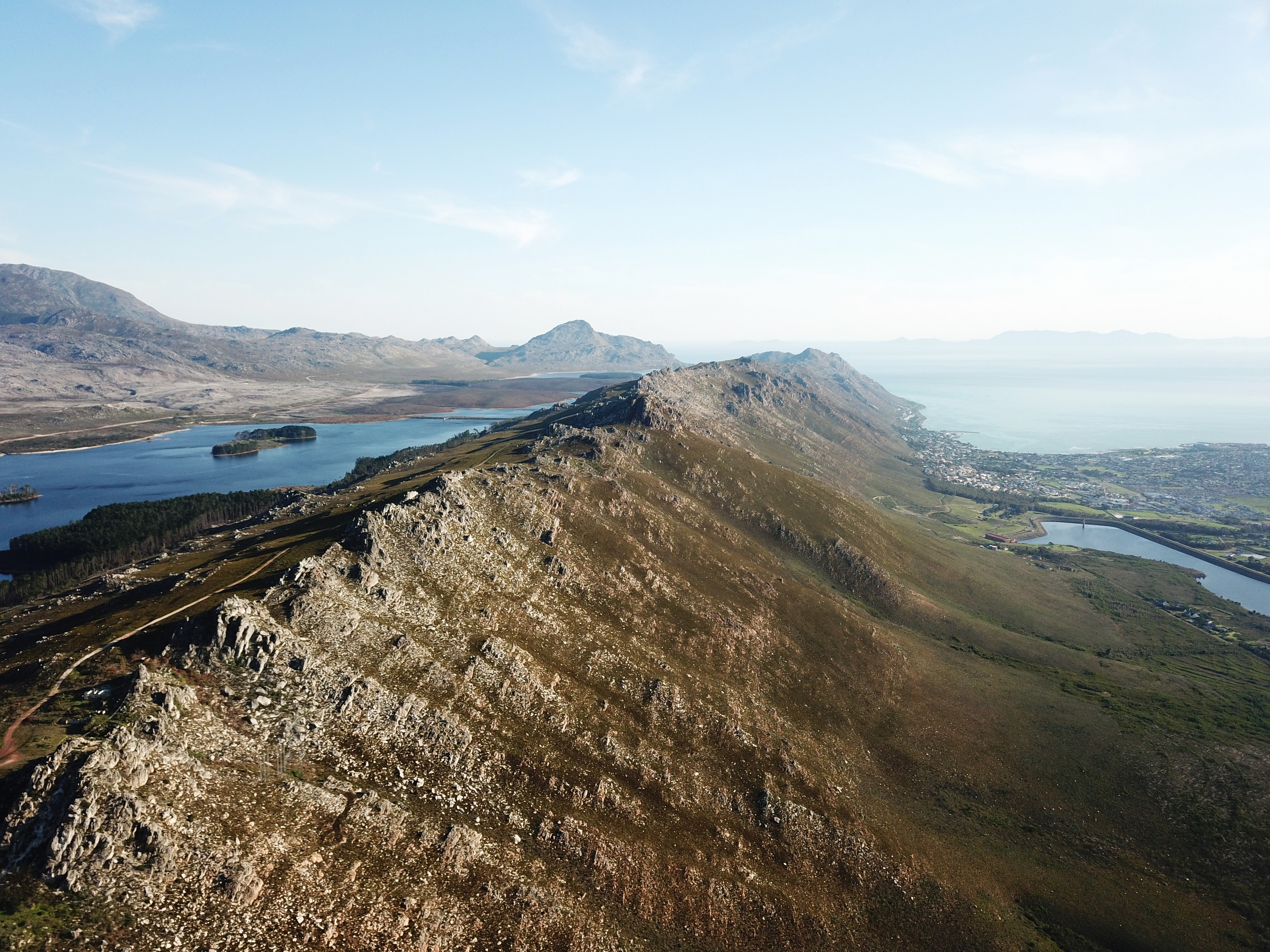
Streenbras pumped storage scheme dams

Power plant	Province	Coordinates	Installed capacity (MW)	Date commissioned (planned)	Operator	Notes
Ingula Pumped Storage	KZN	25°07′51″S 29°49′24″E	1,332	2017	Eskom	
Drakensberg Pumped Storage	FS	28°16′50″S 29°35′12″E	1,000	1981	Eskom	
Palmiet Pumped Storage	WC		400	1988	Eskom	
Steenbras Pumped Storage	WC	34°9′9.07″S 18°53′56.64″E	180	1979	City of Cape Town	
Total:			2,912			

== Hydroelectricity ==
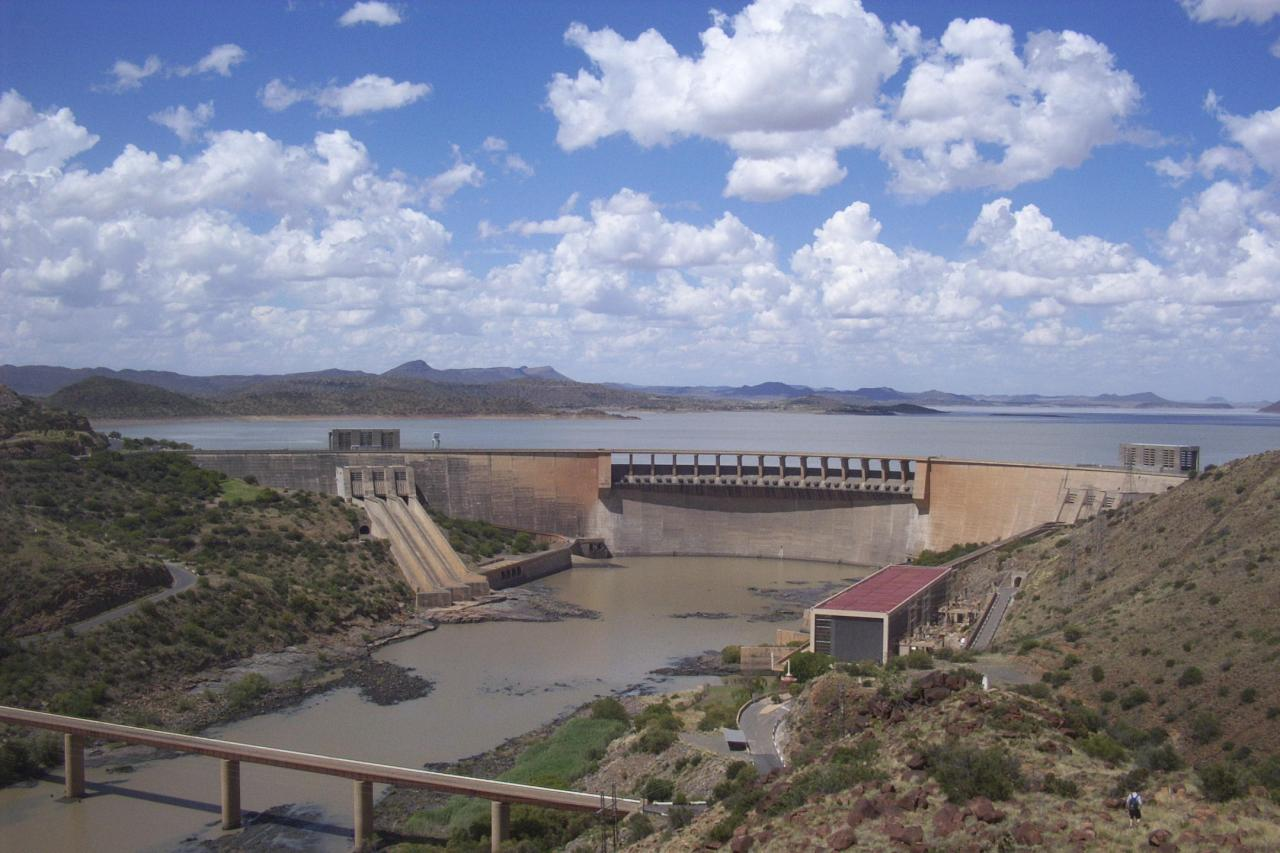
Gariep Dam

For a more complete list of hydro power stations from large to pico size, see the African hydropower database.

Power plant	Province	Coordinates	Installed capacity (MW)	Date commissioned (planned)	Operator	Notes
Cahora Bassa Dam	Tete, Mozambique	15°35′09″S 32°42′17″E	1,500	1974	Government of Mozambique	Imported through SAPP
Gariep	FS/EC	30°37′25″S 25°30′23″E	360	1971	Eskom	
Van der Kloof	NC	29°59′32″S 24°43′54″E	240	1977	Eskom	
Collywobbles / Mbashe	EC	32°00′41″S 28°34′44″E	42		Eskom	
Neusberg	NC	32°00′02″S 28°34′59″E	10		Kakamas Hydro Electric Power	
Second Falls	EC	31°41′10″S 28°53′00″E	11		Eskom	
First Falls	EC	31°35′58″S 28°49′07″E	6		Eskom	
Deelkraal I	GP		5.04		Private	
Western Deep Level 45	GP		4.79		Private	
Saaiplaas	MP		4.59		Private	
Kloof 1	GP		4.52		Private	
East Driefontein	GP		4.48		Private	
Stortemelk	FS		4.47		Private	
Vaal Reef 3	NW/FS		4.33		Private	
President Steyn	GP		4.15		Private	
Kruisvallei Hydro	FS		4		Private	
Merino Power Station	FS	28°21′49.47″S 28°21′42.21″E	4	2010	Bethlehem Hydro	
Bethlehem hydro Merino plant	FS		4		Private	
Elandsrand	GP		3.83		Private	
Western Deep Level 55	GP		3.78		Private	
Vaal Reefs 9	NW/FS		3.46		Private	
Bethlehem hydro Sol Plaatje plant	GP		3		Private	
Sol Plaatje Power Station	FS	28°12′58.78″S 28°21′49.00″E	3	2009	Bethlehem Hydro	
Western Area 1	GP		2.97		Private	
Western Deep Level 70	GP		2.67		Private	
Lydenburg	WC		2.6		Private	
Friedenheim Hydroelectric Power Station	MP	25°27′05″S 30°58′54″E	2.5	1987	Freidenheim Irrigation Board	
Ncora	WC		2.4		Private	
Elandsrand Level 53	GP		2.39		Private	
Geduld 2	WC		2.39		Private	
Kloof 4	WC		2.28		Private	
Ncora Dam Ncora Power Station	EC	31°47′15″S 27°40′1″E	2.1		Eskom	
Lydenburg Hydroelectric Power Station	MP	24°59′52″S 30°26′21″E	2.1	2014	Thaba Chweu Local Municipality	
Elandsrand Level 71	GP		2.01		Private	
Friedenheim	WC		2		Private	
L Ormarins upper	WC		2		Private	
Geduld 1	GP		1.98		Private	
Vaal Reefs 1	NW/FS		1.86		Private	
Western Deep	GP		1.72		Private	
Vaal Reefs 2	NW/FS		1.67		Private	
President Brand	GP		1.62		Private	
Vaal Reef 4	NW/FS		1.62		Private	
Kinross	WC		1.61		Private	
Faure Water Treatment Plant	GP		1.48		Private	
Elandsrand	GP		1.47		Private	
Western Area 2	GP		1.34		Private	
Winkelhaak	WC		1.32		Private	
Bakenkop Hydroelectric Power Station	MP	27°5′7.8″S 30°56′44.7″E	1	1950	Piet Retief	
Total:			2,283			

== Nuclear ==
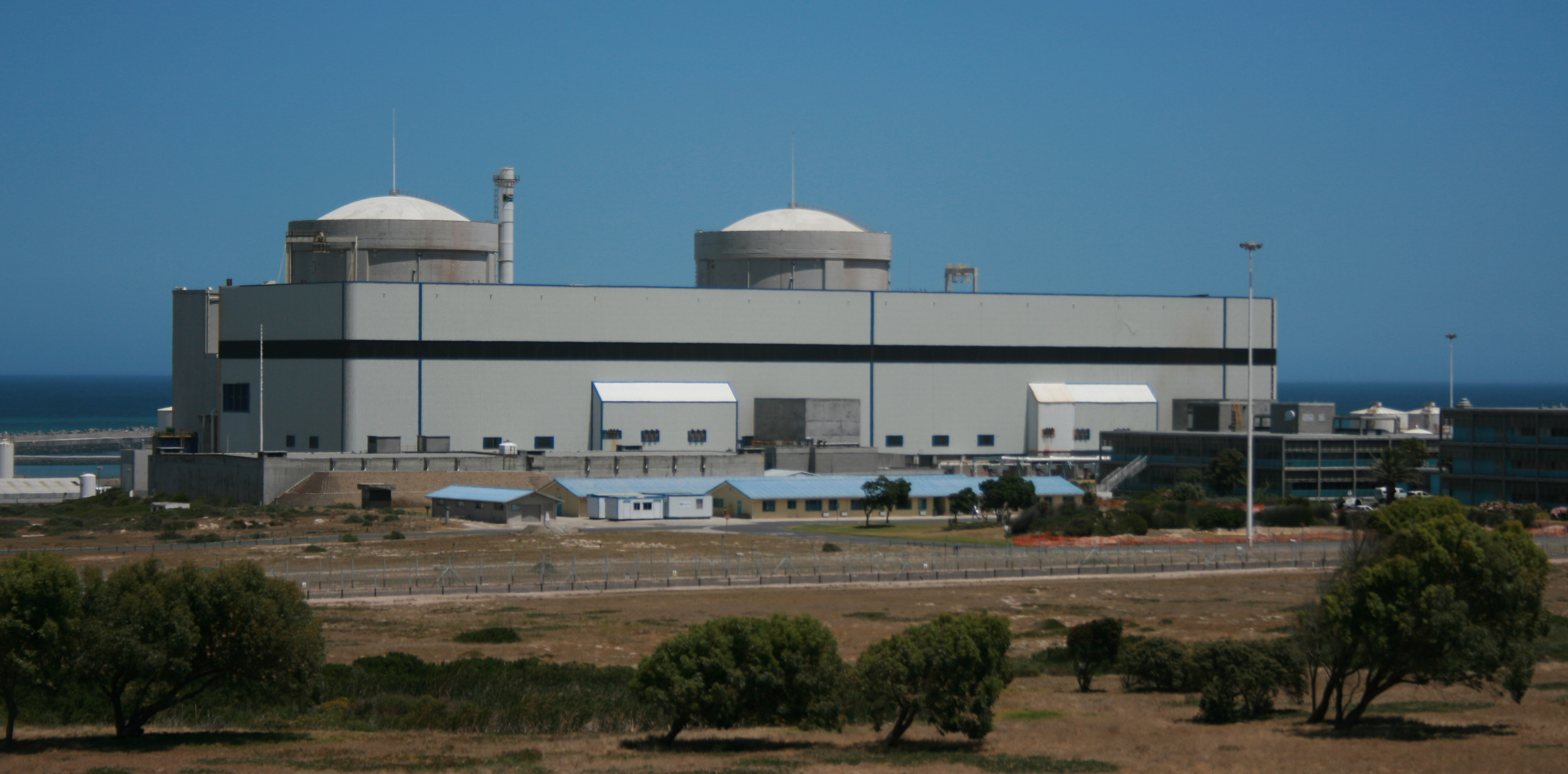
Koeberg

The two reactors at Koeberg are (as of 2017) the only commercial nuclear power plants on the African continent, and account for around 5% of South Africa's electricity production. Low and intermediate waste is disposed of at Vaalputs Radioactive Waste Disposal Facility in the Northern Cape.

Power plant	Province	Coordinates	Capacity (MW)	Annual output (GWh)	Capacity factor %	Date commissioned	Notes
Koeberg Nuclear Power Station	WC	33°40′35.2″S 18°25′55.37″E	1,860	13,668	84	1984	

== Wind power ==
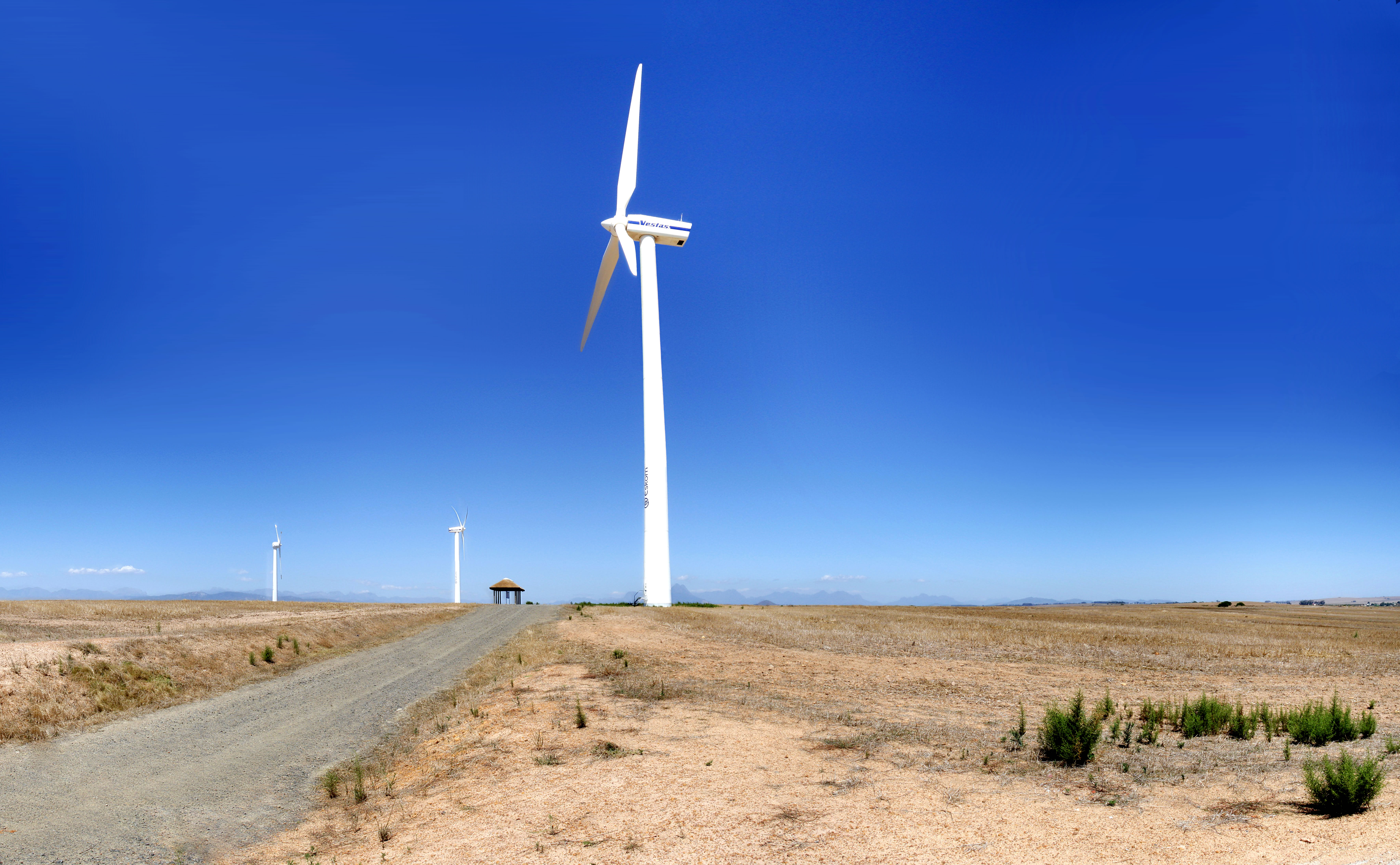
Klipheuwel Wind Farm, Western Cape

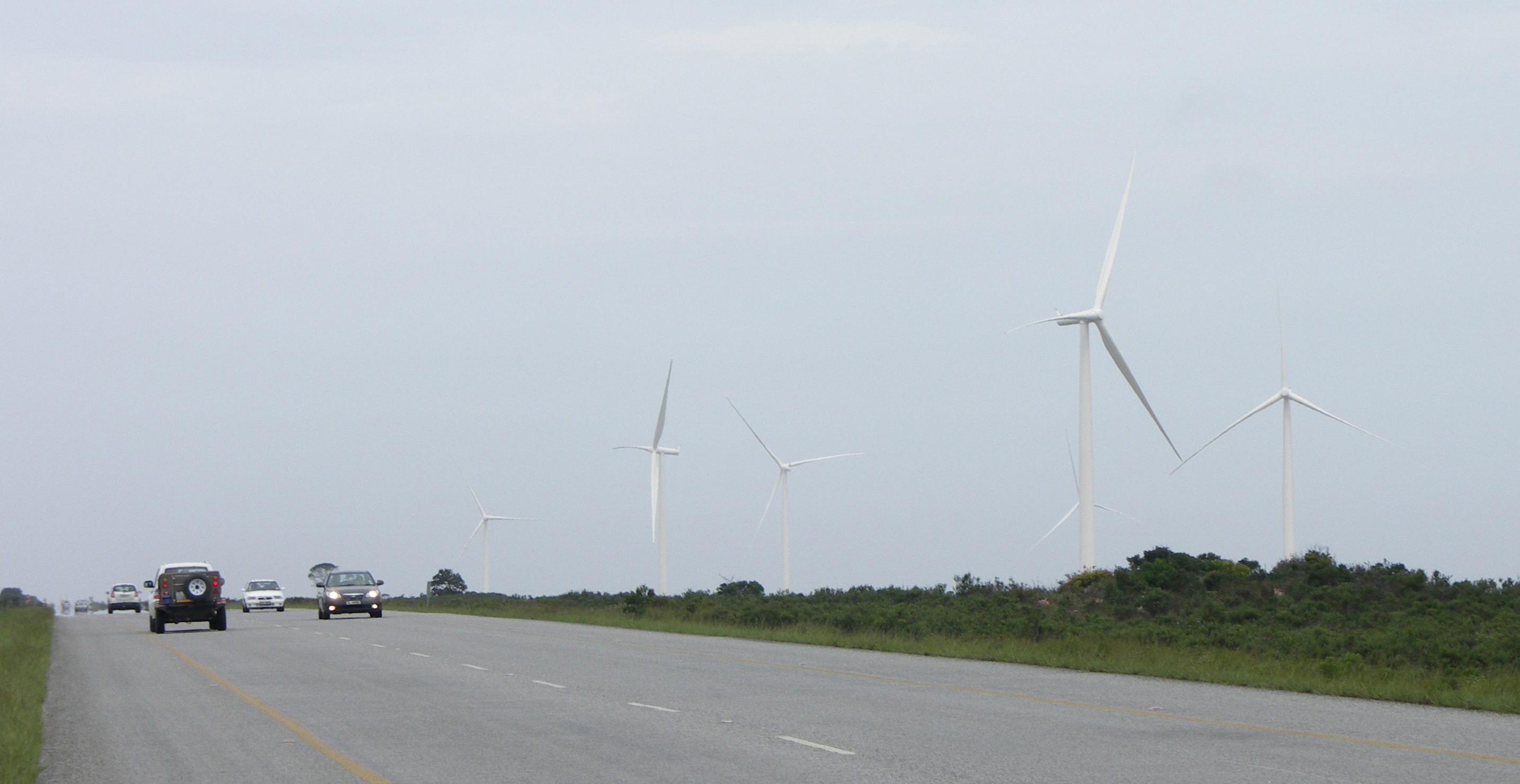
Turbines at the Jeffrey's Bay Wind Farm next to the N2

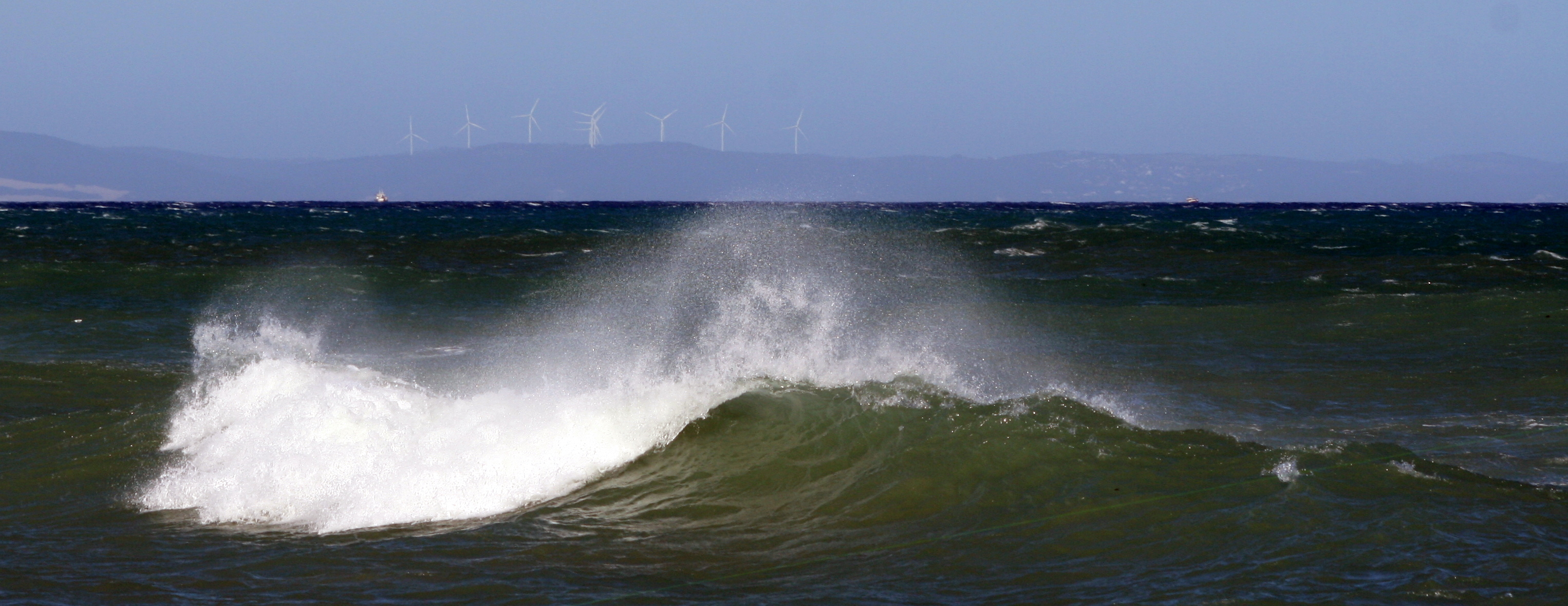
Van Stadens Wind Farm, Eastern Cape, seen from Aston Bay

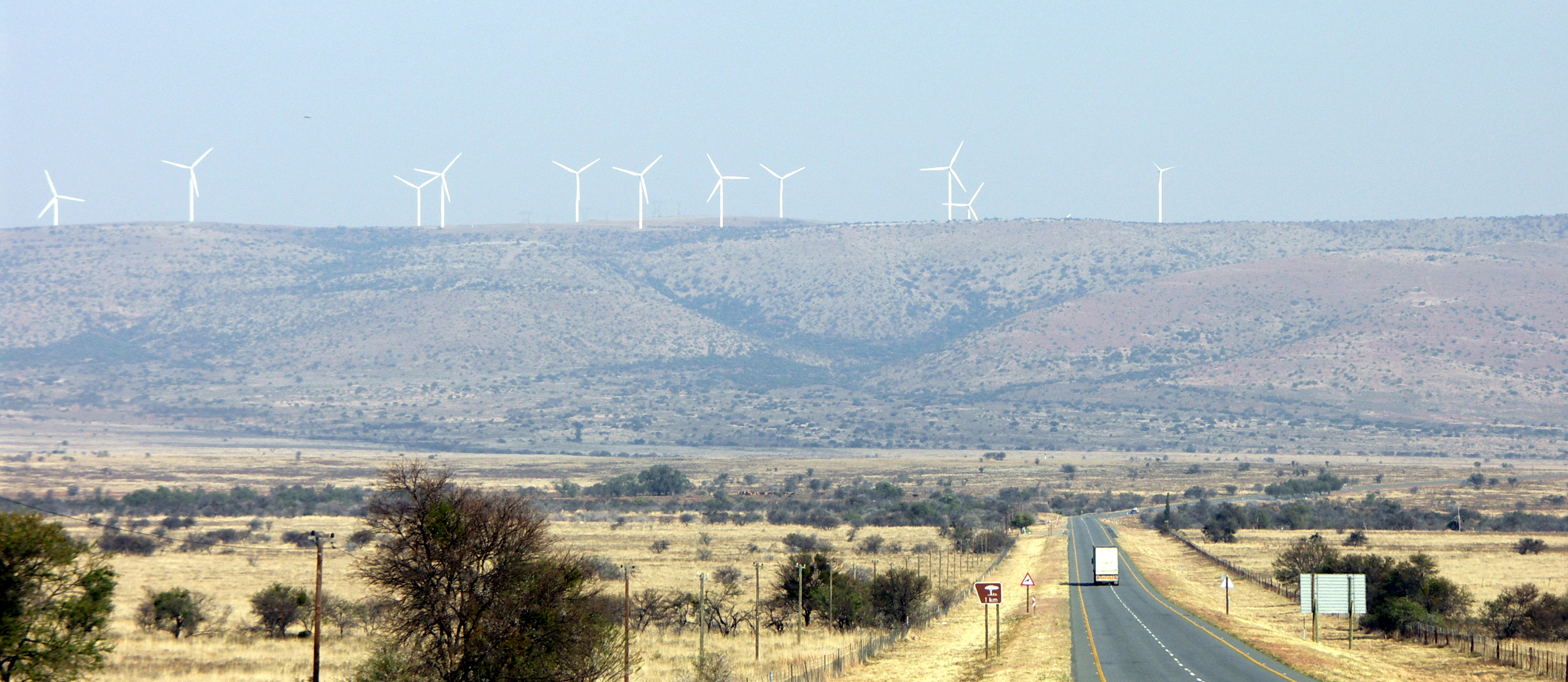
Part of the Cookhouse Wind Farms (Eastern Cape) seen from the N10

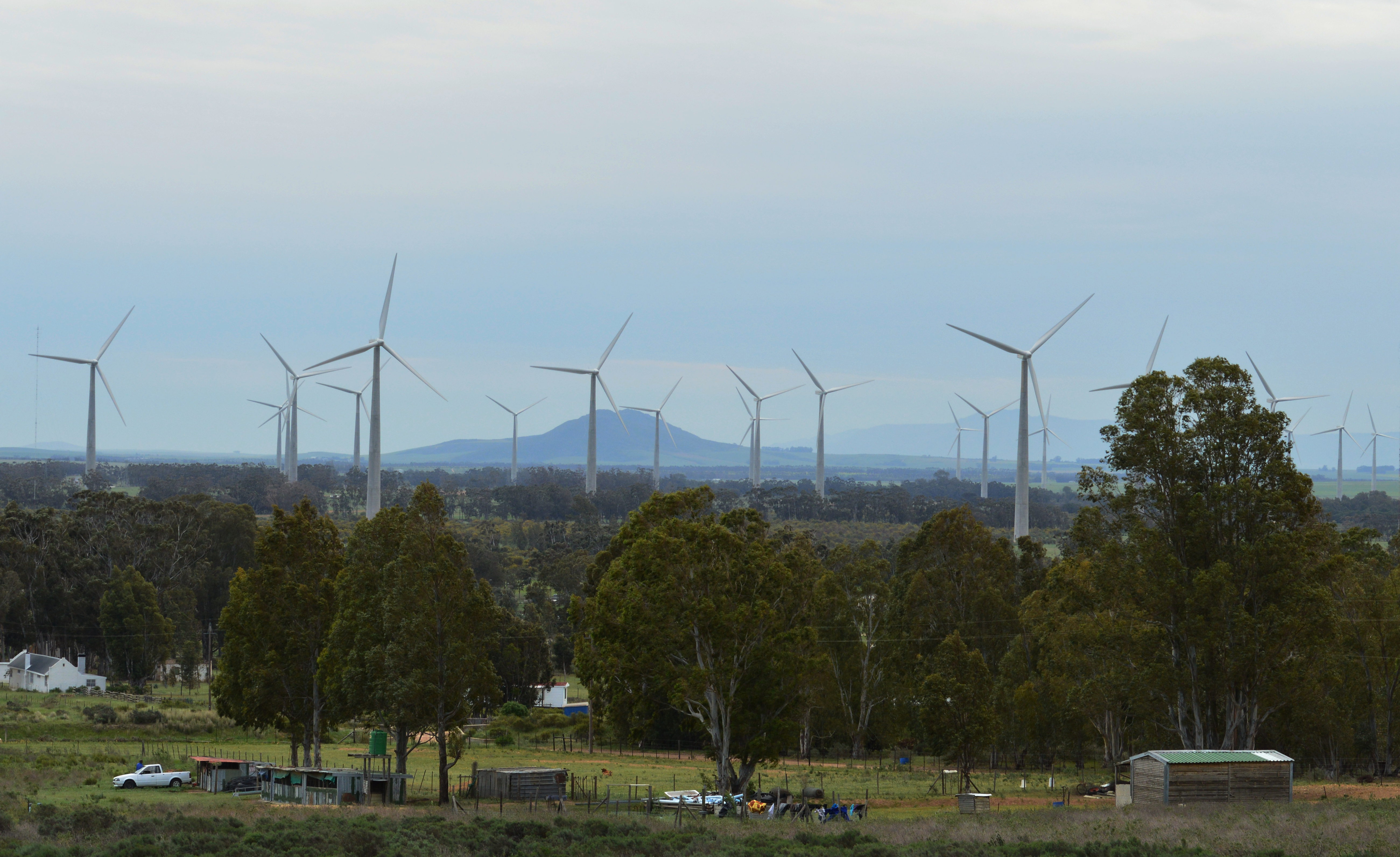
Gouda Wind Farm just outside the town of Gouda, Western Cape

As of 2025, South Africa has 30 operating wind farms, located in the Eastern, Northern, and Western Cape, with a combined capacity of about 5,000 MW.

The Department of Energy (DOE) implemented the Renewable Energy Independent Power Producer Procurement Programme (REIPPPP). This is a tender process consisting of "rounds" where the cheapest tariff and most competitive Economic Development score is awarded a 20-year Power Purchase Agreement (PPA) with Eskom (the state-owned utility) as the Off-taker. The National Treasury has fully underwritten the PPAs. The South African Department of Energy allocated 634 MW of wind capacity in bid window 1.

In bid window 2, 562.5 MW capacity was allocated. In bid window 3, 787 MW were allocated. In bid window 4, 676 MW was awarded. In bid window 4 (additional), 687 MW was added.

Wind farm	Province	Coordinates	Turbine model	Power per turbine (MW)	No. of turbines	Total nameplate capacity (MW)	Commission date	Developer	Operator	Owner	Website
Amakhala Emoyeni	Eastern Cape	32°10′41″S 25°57′31.4″E	Nordex N117	2.4	56	134.4	2016/05	Watt Energy Tata Power		Cennergi/ND	
Chaba	Eastern Cape	32°35′13.34″S 27°57′32.85″E	Vestas V112	3	7	21.5	2015/09	EDF Renewables	EDF	EDF	
Coega	Eastern Cape	33°45′16″S 25°40′30″E	Vestas V90	1.8	1	1.8	2010	Avianto Energy	Electrawinds		
Cookhouse	Eastern Cape	32°44′31.94″S 25°54′33.94″E	Suzlon S88	2.1	66	138.6	2014	Wind Prospect	ACED / Suzlon	Old Mutual	
Copperton	Northern Cape	29°58′37″S 22°21′23″E	Acciona	3.15	34	107.1	2021	Elawan	Elawan	Elawan	
Darling	Western Cape	33°19′55″S 18°14′38″E	Fuhrländer FL62 Fuhrländer FL30 Fuhrländer	1.25 0.25	11	13.25	2008		Darling Independent Power Producer		
Dassiesklip	Western Cape	34°08′16″S 19°13′42″E	Sinovel SL90	3	9	27	2014/07	BioTherm Energy	GLOBELEQ	GLOBELEQ	
Dorper	Eastern Cape	31°26′S 26°24′E	Nordex N100	2.5	40	100	2014/08	Rainmaker Energy	Dorper Wind Farm	Sumitomo Corporation and Dorper Wind Development (A Rainmaker Energy Company)	
Excelsior	Western Cape	34°14′20″S 20°14′05″E	Goldwind GW121	2.5	13	32.5	2020				
Garob	Northern Cape	29°55′44″S 22°24′06″E	Acciona	3.15	46	144.9	2021				
Gibson Bay	Eastern Cape	34°8′59.62″S 24°30′45.90″E	Nordex N90	3	37	111	2017/05	Enel Green Power	Enel Green Power		
Golden Valley	Eastern Cape	32°50′11″S 25°54′04″E	Goldwind	2.5	48	120		BioTherm Energy			
Gouda	Western Cape	33°18′00″S 19°02′00″E	Acciona	3	46	138	2015/09	Acciona Energia	Acciona Energia	Acciona	
Grassridge	Eastern Cape	33°39′24″S 25°35′05″E	Vestas V112	3	20	60	2015	EDF Renewables	EDF Renewables	EDF	
Hopefield	Western Cape	33°5′54.80″S 18°22′52.14″E	Vestas V100	1.8	37	66.6	2014	Umoya Energy		RMB	
Jeffrey's Bay	Eastern Cape	34°0′8.5″S 24°51′1.4″E	Siemens 2.3 MW 101	2.3	60	138	2014	Mainstream Renewable Power	Globeleq South Africa Management Services	Globeleq	
Kangnas	Northern Cape	29°32′41″S 18°14′18″E	Siemens 2.3 MW 108	2.3	61	140.3	2020	Mainstream Renewable Power	Infinity Power	Infinity Power	
Karusa	Northern Cape	32°53′59″S 20°37′43″E	Vestas V136	4.2	35	147	2022	Enel Green Power	Enel Green Power		
Khobab	Northern Cape	30°26′3.9″S 19°33′14.2″E	Siemens	2.3	61	140.3	2018	Mainstream Renewable Power		Infinity Power	
Msenge Emoyeni Wind Power Station	Eastern Cape	32°52′30″S 25°59′55″E	Goldwind	4.5	16	69	2024	ACED-IDEAS-Reatile Consortium	ACED-IDEAS-Reatile Consortium	ACED	
Klipheuwel (dismantled)	Western Cape	33°41′43″S 18°43′30″E	Vestas V47 Vestas V66 Jeumont J48	0.66 1.75 0.75	3	3.16	2002		Eskom Generating Division	Eskom	
Loeriesfontein 2	Northern Cape	30°24′12.1″S 19°35′20.4″E	Siemens	2.3	61	140.3	2017/07	Mainstream Renewable Power		Infinity Power	
Longyuan Mulilo De Aar 1	Northern Cape	30°43′00″S 23°55′14″E	UPC 86	1.5	63	94.5	2013	Longyuan Mulilo Consortium	Longyuan	Longyuan	
Longyuan Mulilo De Aar 2	Northern Cape	30°32′32″S 24°19′11″E	UPC 86	1.5	96	144	2013	Longyuan Mulilo Consortium	Longyuan	Longyuan	
MetroWind Van Stadens	Eastern Cape	33°57′41.4″S 25°14′47.4″E	Sinovel	3	9	27	2014			Metrowind	
Noblesfontein	Northern Cape	31°45′03″S 23°10′24″E	Vestas V100	1.8	41	73.8	2014	Iberdrola Renewables	Elawan	Gestamp Wind	
Nojoli	Eastern Cape	32°45′35.62″S 25°55′7.76″E	Vestas V100	2	44	88	2016/12	Enel Green Power	Enel Green Power	Enel Green Power	
Noupoort	Northern Cape	31°10′41.67″S 25°1′49.51″E	Siemens 2.3 MW 108	2.3	35	80.5	2016/02	Mainstream Renewable Power		Infinity Power	
Nxuba	Eastern Cape	32°44′41.27″S 25°56′28.98″E	Acciona	3.15	47	148		Enel Green Power	Enel Green Power		
Oyster Bay	Eastern Cape	34°07′27″S 24°38′08″E	Vestas V117	3.45	41	147.6		Enel Green Power	Enel Green Power		
Perdekraal	Western Cape	33°03′16″S 20°06′01″E	Siemens SWT-108	2.3	48	110.4	2021	Mainstream Renewable Power		Infinity Power	
Red Cap Kouga	Eastern Cape	34°08′49″S 24°42′40″E	Nordex N90	2.5	32	80		Red Cap Kouga	Red Cap Kouga	Red Cap Kouga	
Roggeveld	Western Cape	32°55′2.04″S 20°30′32.72″E	Acciona AW-125	3	47	147	2022	G7 Renewable Energies		Building Energy	
Sere	Western Cape	31°32′S 18°17′E	Siemens SWT-108	2.3	46	105.8	2014	Eskom	Eskom	Eskom	
Seriti	Mpumalanga	26°59′08″S 29°18′27″E				155	2025 Expected	Seriti Resources	Seriti Green Energy	Seriti Green Energy	
Soetwater	Northern Cape	32°44′52.06″S 20°38′42.99″E	Vestas V117	3.3	43	141.9	2022	Enel Green Power/Pele Green Energy	Enel Green Power Pele Green Energy	Enel Green Power/Pele Green Energy/Soetwater Wind Farm Community Trust	
Tsitsikamma Community	Eastern Cape	34°4′31.62″S 24°30′16.57″E	Vestas V112	3	31	95	2016/03	Cennergi, Watt Energy, Tsitsikamma Development Trust	Vestas Southern Africa (Pty) Ltd		
Waainek	Eastern Cape	33°57′41.4″S 25°14′47.4″E	Vestas V112	3	8	24.6	2015/12	EDF Renewables	EDF Renewables	EDF Renewables	
Wesley–Ciskei	Eastern Cape	33°18′9″S 27°22′14″E	Vestas V126	3.45	10	34.5	2021			EDF Renewables	
Impofu Wind Power Farms Complex	Eastern Cape	34°06′04″S 24°31′48″E		5.8	57	330	2026	Enel Green Power		Enel Green Power	
West Coast One	Western Cape	32°50′3.3″S 17°59′44.2″E	Vestas V90	2	47	94	2015/06	Engie/Windlab		Engie/Investec	
					Total	3562.31					

== Solar photovoltaic ==
The South African Department of Energy allocated 631.53 MW of solar photovoltaic (PV) capacity in the Renewable Energy Independent Power Producer Procurement Programme – bid window 1. In the Renewable Energy IPP Procurement Programme bid window 2, a capacity of 417.1 MW was allocated. In bid window 3, 435 MW was awarded. In bid window 4, 415 MW was awarded. In bid window 4(+), 398 MW was added.

Power plant	Province	Coordinates	Installed capacity MW (planned)	Annual output GWh (expected)	Capacity factor % (expected)	Status	Date commissioned (expected)	Operator	Notes
Kalkbult	NC	30°9′34.09″S 24°7′50.02″E	75	146.5	(21)	Operational	Sep 2013	Scatec Solar	
SlimSun Swartland Solar Park	WC	33°21′00″S 18°31′46″E	5	(8.7)	(20)	Operational	(2013)	Slimsun	
RustMo1 Solar Farm	NW	25°44′13.8″S 27°25′10.49″E	6.93			Operational	Nov 2013 (2014)	RustMo1	
Konkoonsies Solar	NC	28°53′13.56″S 19°33′13.57″E	9.65	(18.6)	(22)	Operational	Mar 2014	Globeleq	
Aries Solar PV Energy Facility	NC	29°29′40.094″S 20°46′58.741″E	9.65	(18.6)	(22)	Operational	Mar 2014 (Jul 2013)	Globeleq	
Greefspan PV Power Plant	NC	29°23′9.24″S 23°18′53.75″E	10			Operational	April 2014	AE-AMD Independent Power Producer 1	
Greefspan II Solar Power Station	NC	29°23′08″S 23°18′54″E	63.2			Operational	September 2021	Greefspan II Solar Consortium	
Herbert PV Power Plant	NC	29°0′9.45″S 23°48′7.55″E	19.9			Operational	April 2014	AE-AMD Independent Power Producer 1	
Mulilo Renewable Energy Solar PV Prieska	NC	29°57′56.4″S 22°18′53.2″E	19.93			Operational	1 October 2014	Gestamp Solar	
Soutpan Solar Park	LP	22°59.5′S 29°15.1′E	28	(50)	(20)	Operational	July 2014	Globeleq	R1.4bn (2012)
Witkop Solar Park	LP	24°2.5′S 29°21.7′E	29.7	(60)	(23)	Operational	Sep 2014 (Aug 2013)	Core Energy (SunEdison)	
Touwsrivier CPV Solar Project	WC	33°24′51.67″S 19°55′0.86″E	36	75	24	Operational	Dec 2014	Soitec	CPV-type
Kenhardt Solar Power Complex Station	NC	29°19′09″S 21°09′33″E	540			Operational	Dec 2023	Scatec	1.1 GWh battery
De Aar 1 Solar Power Station	NC	30°34′45.28″S 24°3′57.86″E	75	(166.4)	(25)	Operational	Aug 2014	Solar Capital	
Mulilo Renewable Energy Solar PV De Aar	NC	30°37′43″S 24°00′24″E	9.7			Operational	Aug 2014	Gestamp Solar	
De Aar 3 Solar Power Station	NC	30°34′45.28″S 24°3′57.86″E	75	(150)	(22)	Operational	March 2016	Solar Capital	
SA Mainstream Renewable Power Droogfontein	NC	28°36′57.58″S 24°45′18.37″E	45.4	(89.4)	(20.4)	Operational	Apr 2014 (Oct 2013)	Mainstream Renewable Power South Africa	
Letsatsi Solar Park	FS	28°54′31.57″S 25°55′31.57″E	64	(150)	(26)	Operational	May 2014	SolarReserve	Investment: about $293M; Add cost R2bn over 20 years 75 MW_{DC}→64 MW_{AC}
Lesedi Solar Park	NC	28°19′04″S 23°21′26″E	64	(150)	(26)	Operational	May 2014	SolarReserve	Investment: about $293M; Add cost R2bn over 20 years 75 MW_{DC}→64 MW_{AC}
Kathu Solar Energy Facility 1	NC	27°36′05″S 22°55′21″E	75	(179)	(27)	Operational	Aug 2014	Building Energy	incorporating tracking system technology
Sishen Solar Facility	NC	27°35′12″S 22°56′09″E	74	(216)	(24)	Operational	Dec 2014	Building Energy	Using horizontal trackers. Corresponds to 74 MW_{AC}.
Aurora Solar Project	WC	32°38′28.84″S 18°29′50.24″E	(9.00)	(18.7)	(20)		(2014)	Aurora-Rietvlei Solar Power	
Vredendal Solar Power Park	WC	31°38′7.36″S 18°30′18.34″E	8.80	(19.0)	(20)	Operational	Jul 2014	Solairedirect	
Linde Solar Project	NC	31°00′10″S 24°39′32″E	36.8	(87)	(25)	Operational	June 2014	Scatec Solar	
Dreunberg Solar Project	EC	30°49′39.5″S 26°12′38″E	32.3 (69.60)	(147.2)	(24)	Operational	Dec 2014	Scatec Solar	
Jasper Solar Energy Project	NC	28°17′53″S 23°21′56″E	75	175.8	(21.4)	Operational	Nov 2014	SolarReserve	Project cost: $260M; 96 MW_{DC}→75 MW_{AC} net generation
Boshoff Solar Park	FS	28°27.9′S 25°11.6′E	57 (66)	(142)	(24)	Operational	Oct 2014	Globeleq	Cost: $247M/R2.4bn (2013)
Upington Solar PV	NC		8.90			Operational	Jul 2014		
Adams Solar PV 2	NC	27°22′10.14″S 23°0′45.18″E	(75)	(167)	(25)	Operational	(Aug 2016)	Enel Green Power	
Tom Burke Solar Park	LP	23°4′24.67″S 27°59′21.48″E	(60)	(119)	(23)	Operational	(Mar 2016)	Enel Green Power	Area: 148 hectares
Mulilo Sonnedix Prieska PV	NC	30°1′27.86″S 22°21′44.02″E	75			Operational	July 2016 (Dec 2015)	Mulilo Renewable Energy	86 MW_{DC}→ 75 MW_{AC} Cost: R1.3bn
Paleisheuwel Solar Park	WC	32°25′23″S 18°44′08″E	75	(143)		Operational	27 April 2016	Enel Green Power	82.5 MW_{DC}→75 MW_{AC} net generation
Pulida Solar Park	FS	29°02′40″S 24°55′30″E	(75)	(153)		Operational	(Aug 2016)	Enel Green Power	Area: 220 hectares (2.2 km^{2})
Mulilo Prieska PV	NC	30°2′2.96″S 22°19′10.93″E	75			Operational	(Nov 2015)	Mulilo Renewable Energy	Area: 205 hectares (2.05 km^{2})
Kathu Solar Energy Facility 2	NC	27°36′05″S 22°55′21″E	(28)	(61.6)		Under development	(201?)	Building Energy	
Sirius 1 Solar Power Station	NC	28°32′45″S 21°06′16″E	86	212		Operational	2020	Scatec Solar	
Droogfontein 2 Solar	NC	28°34′16″S 24°41′52″E	75			Operational	September 2020	ACED	Solar PV with single-axis tracker. Owned by Old Mutual IDEAS Managed Fund, African Rainbow Energy and Power, Reatile Group, Phakwe Solar.
Bolobedu Solar Power Station	LP	23°36′58″S 30°20′32″E	148	300		Under development	(2023)	Voltalia Consortium	
Dyason's Klip 1	NC	28°34′20″S 21°04′36″E	86	212		Operational	2020	Scatec Solar	
Dyason's Klip 2	NC	28°33′58″S 21°03′46″E	(75)			Contracting		Scatec Solar	
Doornhoek Solar Power Station	NW	26°53′42″S 26°41′30″E	(120)	(325)		Under development	(December 2025)	AMEA Power	
Konkoonsies II Solar Facility	NC	28°53′30″S 19°33′44″E	(75)	(208)	(27.8)	Operational	September 2020 (Feb 2017)	BioTherm Energy	Solar PV with single-axis tracker
Aggeneys Solar Project	NC	29°14′09″S 18°53′52″E	(40)	(111)	(28.4)	Operational	July 2020 (Aug 2016)	BioTherm Energy	Solar PV with single-axis tracker
Solar Capital Orange	NC	30°30′31″S 19°36′23″E	(75)			Contracting	(March 2018)	Solar Capital	Solar PV with single-axis tracker
De Wildt Solar Power Station	NW	25°38′28″S 27°56′14″E	50			Operational	January 2021	De Wildt Solar Limited	Solar PV with single-axis tracker
Bokamoso Solar	NW	27°09′24″S 26°24′01″E	(68)	(130)		Under development	(Nov 2017)	ACED	Solar PV with single-axis tracker. Under construction, scheduled commercial operation date June 2020.
Zeerust Solar Power Station	NW	25°34′43″S 26°04′51″E	75	180		Operational	January 2021	Zeerust Solar Company	Solar PV with single-axis tracker
Sedibeng Solar Power Station	GP	26°25′48″S 28°03′48″E	6.5			Operational	May 2022	SOLA Group	Solar PV with single-axis tracker
Waterloo Solar Park	NW	27°01′15″S 24°46′32″E	(75)			Under development		ACED	Solar PV with single-axis tracker. Under construction, scheduled commercial operation date September 2020.
Adams Solar PV Project	NC	-27.38803 23.00172	5			Operational			
Aurora-Rietvlei Solar Power	WC	-32.64134 18.49729	9			Operational		Aurora Rietvlei Solar Power	
Bellatrix Solar PV Project	NC	-31.53302 23.18094	5			Operational			
Capella Solar PV Project	NW	-26.26704 24.56716	5			Operational			
Castor Solar PV Project	FS	-28.56623 25.29376	5			Operational			
Danielskuil Solar Facility	NC	-28.2105 23.5556	5			Operational			
Disselfontein Solar Facility	NC	-29.4731 23.9098	5			Operational			
Du Plessis Solar PV4	NC	-30.64328 24.01085	5			Operational			
Electra Capital	WC	-32.42097 18.73458	75			Operational		Electra Capital	
Greefspan PV Power Plant No. 2	NC	-29.38486 23.31147	55			Operational		Greefspan PV No. 2	
Heuningspruit PV1	FS	-27.45278 27.41222	5			Operational			
Kakamas Solar Facility	NC	-28.78056 20.60556	5			Operational			
Keimoes Solar Facility	NC	-28.69028 20.98	5			Operational			
Mount Roper Solar Facility	NC	-27.34611 23.19167	5			Operational			
Mulilo Solar PV De Aar	NC	-30.6279 24.00545	10			Operational		Mulilo Renewable Energy Solar PV De Aar	
Mulilo Solar PV Prieska	NC	-29.96766 22.31968	19.12			Operational		Mulilo Prieska PV	
Skuitdrift 1	NC	-28.61421 19.78111	5			Operational			
Skuitdrift 2	NC	-28.60533 19.77175	5			Operational			
South African Mainstream Renewable Power De Aar	NC	-30.619 24.03389	45.6			Operational		De Aar Solar Power	
South African Mainstream Renewable Power	NC	-28.612 24.758	45.6			Operational		Droogfontein Solar Power	
Steynsrus PV1	FS	-27.90472 27.53167	5			Operational			
Steynsrus PV2	FS	-27.90556 27.54139	5			Operational			
Upington Airport	NC	-28.4 21.268	8.9			Operational		Sublunary Trading	
Naos-1	FS	26°57′59″S 26°54′13″E	TBC	TBC	TBC	Under development	TBC	SOLA Group	Upon completion, it will be the largest private utility‑scale solar and battery storage project in South Africa.
		Total:	1,717 (1,045)						

== Concentrated solar power ==
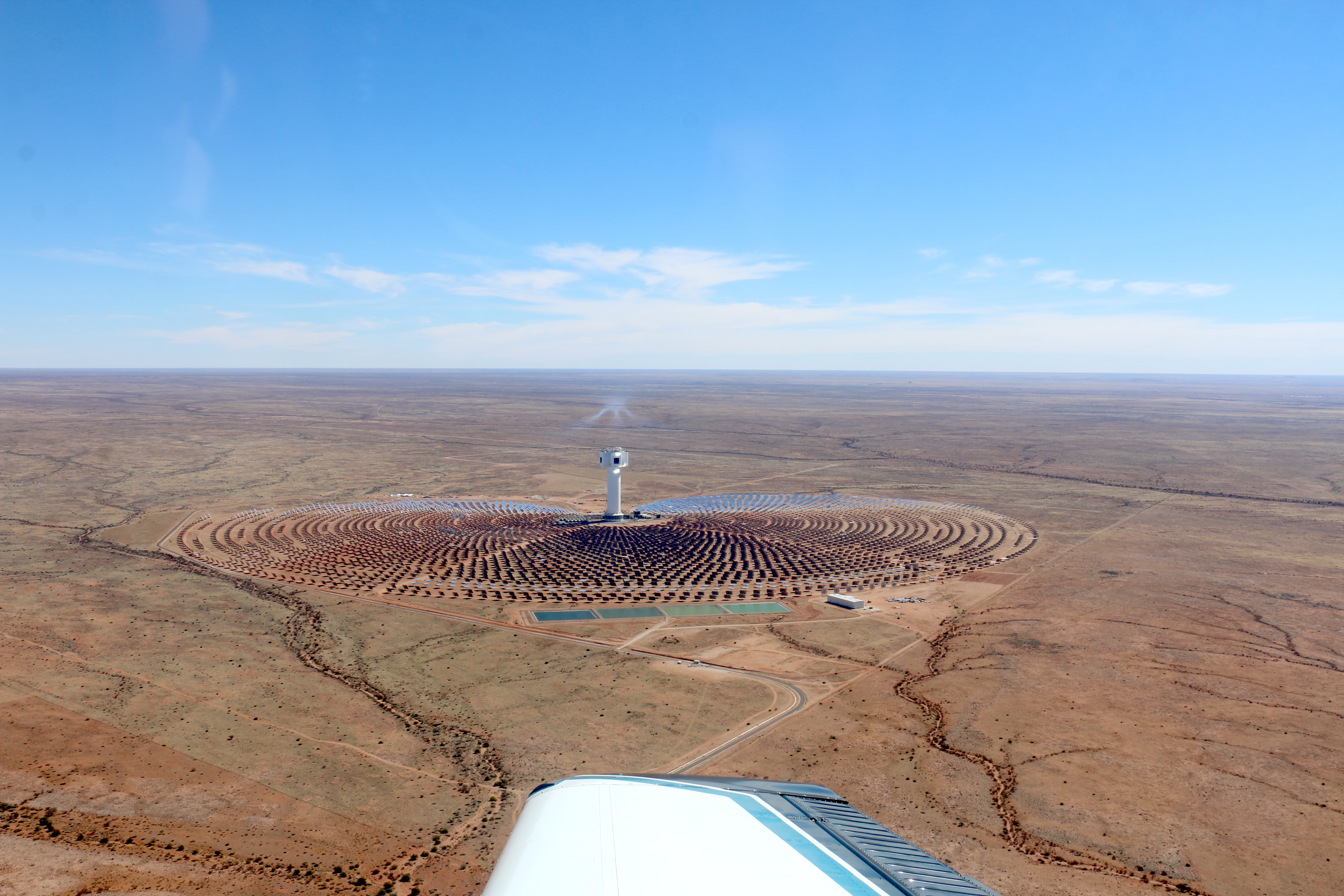
Bird's eye view of Khi Solar One (October 2016)

Concentrated solar power uses molten salt energy storage in a tower or trough configuration.

The South African Department of Energy allocated 150 MW of concentrated solar power (CSP) capacity in the Renewable Energy Independent Power Producer Procurement Programme – bid window 1. In the Renewable Energy IPP Procurement Programme: window 2, a capacity of 50 MW was allocated In the Renewable Energy IPP Procurement Programme: window 3, a capacity of 200 MW was allocated. In an additional bid allocation, bid window 3.5, a further 200 MW was allocated.

Power plant	Province	Coordinates	Installed capacity (MW) (planned)	Annual output (GWh) (expected)	Capacity factor % (expected)	Energy storage (hours)	Date commissioned (expected)	Operator	Notes
Khi Solar One	NC	28°32′08″S 21°04′41″E	50	(190)	(43)	2	Feb 2016	Abengoa	Area: 6 km^{2}
KaXu Solar One	NC	28°52′46″S 19°35′34″E	100	(320)	(36)	2.5	March 2015	Abengoa	Total investment: US$891M
Bokpoort CSP	NC	28°43′26.96″S 21°59′34.88″E	50	(200)	(45)	9.3	Dec 2015	ACWA Power	$328M
Xina CSP South Africa	NC	28°53′40.56″S 19°35′53.52″E	100	380	44	5	Aug 2017	Abengoa	$880M total investment
Kathu Solar Park	NC	27°36′42″S 23°01′40″E	100	383		4.5	Feb 2018	Engie	Parabolic trough R12bn (2016)
Ilanga 1	NC	28°29′25.79″S 21°32′27.13″E	100			4.5	2018	Karoshoek Consortium	
Redstone Solar Thermal Power	NC	28°17′53″S 23°21′56″E	(100)	(480)	(54)	12	(Q1 2024)	ACWA Power	Tower configuration, dry cooling. Area: 6.07 km^{2}. R8bn capital cost, R150M yearly running costs (2015)
Rooipunt CSP	NC	28°28′58″S 21°01′20″E	(150)	(730)		12	(2021)		
Total:			500 (750)						

== Hybrid power ==
Hybrid power station	Community	Coordinates	Capacity	Completed	Owner	Notes
Oya Hybrid Power Station	Breede Valley, Western Cape	32°49′23″S 20°17′57″E	155 MW (solar); 242 MWh (BESS); 86 MW (wind)	2026 expected	Oya Energy	

== Landfill gas power ==
Power plant	Province	Installed capacity (MW) (planned)	Coordinates		Date commissioned (expected)	Operator	Notes
Joburg Landfill Gas to Electricity - Marie Louise	GP	4.76	-26.19172	27.88122	2014–2016	ENER-G Systems Joburg (Pty) Ltd	
Joburg Landfill Gas to Electricity - Goudkoppies	GP	4.04	-26.28223	27.92717	2014–2016	ENER-G Systems Joburg (Pty) Ltd	
Joburg Landfill Gas to Electricity - Linbro Park	GP	3.17	-26.09375	28.12133	2014–2016	ENER-G Systems Joburg (Pty) Ltd	
Joburg Landfill Gas to Electricity - Ennerdale	GP	1.03	-26.36947	27.83272	2014–2016	ENER-G Systems Joburg (Pty) Ltd	
Joburg Landfill Gas to Electricity - Robinson Deep	GP	5	-26.23335	28.04073	2014–2016	ENER-G Systems Joburg (Pty) Ltd	
Mariannhill Landfill Gas to Electricity	KZN	1	29°50.707′S 30°50.180′E		2006	eThekwini Metropolitan Municipality	
Bisasar Road Landfill Gas to Electricity	KZN	6.5			2009	eThekwini Metropolitan Municipality	
Total:		25.5					

== Biomass power ==
Power plant	Province	Installed capacity MW (planned)	Annual output GWh (expected)	Date commissioned (expected)	Operator	Latitude	Longitude	Notes
PetroSA Biogas Project		4,2	(32)	2007	PetroSA	34.173811°S 21.984621°E		
Ngodwana Energy Project		25	(198)	Q3 2018	Sappi	25°34′41″S 30°39′32″E		
Mkuze		(17.5)	(130)	2023–2024				
Umfolozi Sugar Mill	KZN	4.5			Umfolozi Sugar Mill Pty (Ltd)	-28.442732	32.184034	
Tongaat Felixton	KZN	9			Tongaat Hulett Sugar SA Ltd	-28.834445	31.890996	
Komati Mill	MP	8			TSB Sugar International	-25.5544	31.866333	
Busby Renewables Biomass Project	MP	5				-26.81201	30.44063	
George Biomass to Energy Project	WC	5				-33.99493	22.45337	
Tongaat Amatikulu	KZN	5			Tongaat Hulett Sugar SA Ltd	-29.045193	31.525656	
Malelane Mill	MP	4			TSB Sugar International	-25.275112	31.333889	
Illovo Eston	KZN	2			Illovo Sugar (South Africa) Ltd	-26.224674	28.187927	
Total:		71.7						

== See also ==
- List of decommissioned power stations in South Africa
- Department of Energy (South Africa)
- Fossil-fuel power plant
- Renewable energy in Africa
- Energy in South Africa
