= List of decommissioned power stations in South Africa =

The following is a list of electricity generating facilities within South Africa that are not operating. have been decommissioned or were notable power stations in the past.

Power plant	Province	Date commissioned	Installed capacity (megawatts)	Status	Coordinates	Notes
Athlone Power Station	Western Cape	1961	180	Decommissioned (2003)	33°56′54″S 18°30′45″E	
Bloemfontein Power Station	Free State		102	Not operating	29°07′27″S 26°13′30″E	
Colenso Power Station	KwaZulu-Natal	1926	160	Decommissioned (1984)	28°43′51″S 29°49′36″E	
Dock Road Power Station	Western Cape	1905		Decommissioned (1962?)	33°55′02″S 18°25′26″E	
Driehoek Power Station	Gauteng	1898	2 (June 1906)	Decommissioned (1911)	26°13′00″S 28°09′25″E	
Ingagane Power Station	KwaZulu-Natal	1963	500	Decommissioned (1990)	27°50′45″S 29°59′11″E	
Jeppe Street Power Station	Gauteng	1927		Decommissioned (1961)	26°12′11″S 28°02′04″E	
Komati Power Station	Mpumalanga	1961	1000	Decommissioned (2022)	26°05′24″S 29°28′19″E	
Kroonstad Power Station	Free State		30	Decommissioned	27°40′04″S 27°12′07″E	
Mount Road Power Station	Eastern Cape	1906		Decommissioned (1986)	33°56′48″S 25°36′13″E	
Orlando Power Station	Gauteng	1942	300	Decommissioned (1998)	26°15′14″S 27°55′30″E	
President Street Power Station, Johannesburg	Gauteng	1906	10	Decommissioned (1907)		
Swartkops Power Station	Eastern Cape	1954		Decommissioned	33°52′16″S 25°35′51″E	
Umgeni Power Station	KwaZulu-Natal	1954	240	Decommissioned (1989)	29°48′28″S 30°52′51″E	
West Bank Power Station	Eastern Cape	1905		Decommissioned (1989)		
Brakpan power plant	Gauteng	1908	6	Decommissioned (unknown date)	26°13′09″S 28°22′09″E	
Simmerpan power plant	Gauteng	1909/10	18	Decommissioned (unknown date)	26°13′34″S 28°09′21″E	
Roshervilledam power plant	Gauteng	1911	68	Decommissioned (unknown date)	26°13′31″S 28°06′36″E	
Vereeniging power plant	Gauteng	1912	44	Decommissioned (unknown date)	26°41′34″S 27°55′36″E	

== See also ==
- List of power stations in South Africa
