= President Street Power Station, Johannesburg =

Retired power plant in South Africa

President Street Power Station, Johannesburg was an early 20th-century power station in Johannesburg, South Africa.

When the President Street Power Station was constructed, supply tenders were invited. Although the cheapest was for a steam driven plant, consultants recommended a gas engine scheme which promised sufficient savings in fuel consumption to recover the increased capital cost within a few years.

The estimated power needed by Johannesburg, almost 10 MW, required gas engines bigger than any previously built. Mordey & Dawbarn, the consulting engineers, recommended the following supplies, which were adopted by the municipality:

1. 500/600 volts DC (negative earthed) for the Johannesburg tramways.
2. 460/520 volts DC for a 230+230 volt 3 wire distribution with earthed centre to provide power and light for the city centre.
3. 3,000 volt 2-phase 50 Hz AC for transmitting power to outlying districts and to supply motor converters for distant DC tramway feeds.

Stewart and Company, the Scottish contractors, supplied untested and experimental engines. There had been a history of costly failure of gas engines in the UK linked to the problem of breakdowns caused by the impurities in bituminous coal. Apparently no one had checked before starting on the scheme whether the bituminous coal to be used in the gas producers was suitable for the installation. Within months the engines ran into serious problems. New engines and producer plant proved unreliable and expensive to operate and there were heavy maintenance costs.

An explosion in the boiler house in March 1907 led to the entire installation being shut down in May 1907. By mid-1907 the city council rejected the whole scheme and instituted legal proceedings against the suppliers to recover their losses.

== See also ==
- List of power stations in South Africa
