= Ngodwana Biomass Power Station =

Biomass power station in South Africa

- Ngodwana Biomass Power Station
- Country: South Africa
- Location: Ngodwana (Mbombela), Ehlanzeni District, Mpumalanga Province
- Coordinates: 25°34′32″S 30°39′53″E
- Status: Under construction
- Commission date: To be determined
- Construction cost: US$89 million
- Owner: Ngodwana Energy Limited

Thermal power station
- Primary fuel: Biomass

Power generation
- Nameplate capacity: 25 MW (34,000 hp)

Ngodwana Biomass Power Station, also Sappi Ngodwana Biomass Power Station, is a 25 MW (34,000 hp) biomass-fired thermal power plant under development in South Africa. Ngodwana Energy Limited, a South African independent power producer was awarded the concession to design, finance, construct, operate and maintain the power station.

== Location ==
The power plant is under construction in the town of Ngodwana, in Ehlanzeni District, in Mpumalanga Province. Ngodwana is located approximately 44 kilometres (27 mi), by road, southwest of Mbombela, the provincial capital. This is approximately 298 kilometres (185 mi) northeast of Johannesburg, the commercial and financial capital of South Africa. The power station is located adjacent to the Sappi Ngodwana Paper Mill in Mpumalanga, South Africa, about 50 kilometres (31 mi), west of Mbombela.

== Overview ==
In April 2018, the engineering, procurement and construction (EPC) contract was awarded to a consortium comprising (a) ELB Engineering Services (Pty) Limited (b) KC Cottrell Company Limited and (c) ELB Educational Trust.

The power station will use bio-waste from the adjacent wood and paper mill to boil water and produce steam. The steam will drive turbines of generate electricity. The waste gases from burning wood will be treated to remove pollutants, contaminants and carcinogens, before release into the atmosphere.

The power generated will be evacuated along a high voltage transmission line to a substation where the power will be integrated into the national power grid. The South African state-owned utility company Eskom, will purchase the power under a long-term power purchase agreement. A biomass storage unit will be constructed as part of this project.

== Ownership ==
The table below illustrates the shareholding in Ngodwana Solar Power Station.

Ownership of Ngodwana Solar Power Station
Rank	Shareholder	Percentage	Notes
1	Ngodwana Energy Limited		
2	Fusion Energy Limited		
3	KC Africa		
4	Ngodwana Energy Employees Trust	5.0	
5	Ngodwana Energy Community Trust	5.0	
	Total	100.00	

== Construction costs and timeline ==
The total cost for the power plant is estimated at US$89 million. Of that, US$66.75 million (75 percent) will be borrowed from Absa Bank Limited and Nedbank Limited. The remaining US$22.25 million (25 percent) will be raised by the power station owners.

In April 2018, it was estimated that construction would take 27 months from start to commercial commissioning.

The start up of the power plant was in March 2022.

== See also ==
- List of power stations in South Africa
