= Bolobedu Solar Power Station =

Solar park in South Africa

- Country: South Africa
- Location: Bolobedu, Greater Letaba Municipality, Mopani District, Limpopo
- Coordinates: 23°36′58″S 30°20′32″E
- Status: Proposed
- Construction began: 2023 (expected)
- Commission date: 2024 (expected)
- Owner: Bolobedu Solar Consortium
- Operator: Voltalia of France

Solar farm
- Type: Flat-panel PV

Power generation
- Nameplate capacity: 149 MW (200,000 hp)
- Annual net output: 300 GWh

The Bolobedu Solar Power Station is an 148 MW solar power plant planned in South Africa. The solar farm is owned and under development by a consortium led by Voltalia, the French multinational independent power producer (IPP) and Black South African shareholders, including a community trust. The off-taker of the power generated here is Richards Bay Minerals (RBM), a South African mining company owned by the Anglo-Australian mining conglomerate, Rio Tinto. The power will be conveyed from the solar farm to the customer's mine using the transmission lines of Eskom, the national electricity parastatal company, as is permissible under South African law.

== Location ==
The power station would be located in the community of Bolobedu, in Greater Letaba Municipality, Mopani District, in the Limpopo Province of South Africa. Bolobedu is located approximately 120 kilometres (75 mi) north-east of Polokwane, the capital city of Limpopo Province.

== Overview ==
The design calls for a ground-mounted photovoltaic solar panel power station with generation capacity of 148 MW. It is calculated that the solar farm will generate 300 GWh of electricity on an annual basis. Voltalia has committed in writing to supply that energy to RBM for use in its mines and related facilities in Limpopo Province. A long-term power purchase agreement (PPA), was signed to that effect in October 2022. Eskom's electricity transmission network will be used to deliver the power from the solar farm to the customer premises.

== Developers ==
The table below illustrates the composition of the consortium that owns and is developing this renewable energy infrastructure development. For descriptive purposes, the SPV will be called "Bolobedu Solar Consortium".

Bolobedu Solar Consortium shareholding
Rank	Shareholder	Domicile	Percentage	Notes
1	Voltalia	France	44.0	
2	Black Women Enterprise(s)	South Africa	10.0	
3	Black Enterprise(s)	South Africa	41.0	
3	Bolobedu Community Trust	South Africa	5.0	
	Total		100.00	

== Construction ==
Construction began in January 2023, with commercial commissioning expected in 2024.

== Other considerations ==
This development is expected to generate approximately 700 construction jobs and 53 permanent positions during the operations phase. Construction is expected to start in 2023, with commercial commissioning expected in 2024.

== See also ==
- List of power stations in South Africa
