= Letsatsi Solar Park =

Photovoltaic power station in South Africa

- Country: South Africa
- Coordinates: 28°56′27″S 25°56′59″E
- Status: Operational
- Commission date: May 2014
- Construction cost: US$487 million
- Owner: Letsatsi Solar Energy Ltd.

Solar farm
- Type: Flat-panel PV
- Site area: ~100 ha (247 acres)

Power generation
- Units operational: 277,632
- Nameplate capacity: 75 MW_{p} (64 MW_{AC})
- Annual net output: 150 GWh

External links
- Website: lesedipv.com/letsatsi/

The Letsatsi Solar Park is a 75-megawatt (MW) solar photovoltaic power station in Bloemfontein, Free State, South Africa. The solar park uses 277,632 conventional, multicrystalline silicon PV solar panels and went fully on line in May 2014. Its annual generation will be about 150 gigawatt-hours, enough to supply electricity for about 50,000 to 60,000 homes, while reducing the use of pollution-generating fossil fuels. The Letsatsi Solar Park cost $487 million and is operated by the Letsatsi Solar Energy Ltd., which plans to operate the solar park for at least 20 years.

== See also ==
- Photovoltaic power stations
- Solar power in South Africa
- List of power stations in South Africa § Solar PV power
