= Ankerlig Power Station =

Gas-fired power station in Western Cape, South Africa

- Country: South Africa
- Location: Atlantis, Western Cape (City of Cape Town Metropolitan Municipality)
- Coordinates: 33°35′32″S 18°27′37″E
- Status: Operational
- Commission date: 2007
- Owner: Eskom
- Operator: Eskom

Thermal power station
- Primary fuel: Diesel

Power generation
- Units operational: 9
- Nameplate capacity: 1338 MW

Ankerlig Power Station (previously known as the Atlantis OCGT power station) is one of five gas turbine power plants in South Africa and has the capacity to produce 1338 megawatts.

The plant name is derived from the Afrikaans form of the expression "raise the anchor" (Afrikaans "lig die anker"); it is intended to connote a community that 'raises the anchor and sails away from poverty towards prosperity'. The Ankerlig plant was built at the same time as the Gourikwa Power Station at a combined cost of R3.5 billion and was opened on 1 October 2007 by Deputy President Mlambo-Ngcuka. The plant is located close to the R27 just north of Atlantis in the Western Cape.

== Design ==
To cope with the increasing power demands of the Western Cape during periods of peak power demands, a gas turbine design that can be powered by either natural gas or liquid fuel, kerosene or diesel was chosen. The plant has nine cycle gas turbines each approximately 60 metres (200 ft) tall and eight fuel storage tanks with a combined storage capacity of 43 million litres (1.5 million cubic feet). The plant was built by Siemens.

== Conversion to natural gas ==
Due to the high cost of diesel and the discovery of natural gas, the Ibhubesi gas project, 400km north west offshore, Ankerlig is to be converted to gas.

== Crime ==
Diesel theft from Ankerlig had allegedly been continuing for some time when an employee was arrested in December 2022 for allegedly stealing R500,000 worth of diesel at the plant. Diesel theft is part of a wider problem which affects Eskom’s ability to operate gas turbines, and alleviate power shortages during high demand.

== See also ==
- List of power stations in South Africa
