= De Wildt Solar Power Station =

Solar power station in South Africa

- Country: South Africa
- Location: Brits, Madibeng Municipality, Bojanala Platinum District, North West Province, South Africa
- Coordinates: 25°36′35″S 27°43′49″E
- Status: Operational
- Construction began: March 2019
- Commission date: January 2021
- Construction cost: US$92.8 million
- Owner: De Wildt Solar
- Operator: Ingwepath Pty Limited

Solar farm
- Type: Flat-panel PV
- Site area: 185 hectares (460 acres)

Power generation
- Units operational: 169,140
- Nameplate capacity: 50 MW (67,000 hp)
- Annual net output: 123 GWh

External links
- Website: Homepage

The De Wildt Solar Power Station, is a 50 MW solar power station in South Africa. The power station was developed as is owned by a consortium of five South African independent power producers (IPPs) and investment firms. The energy generated here is sold directly to Eskom, the national electricity utility parastatal company, for integration into the South African grid. A 20-year power purchase agreement (PPA) between the solar farm owners and Eskom governs the sale and purchase of electricity between the two.

== Location ==
The power station is located near the town of Brits, in Madibeng Municipality, in Bojanala District, in the North West Province, of South Africa. Brits is located about 261 kilometres (162 mi) east of the city of Mahikeng, the provincial capital. This is approximately 70 kilometres (43 mi), northwest of the city of Pretoria, the capital of South Africa.

== Overview ==
The solar farm sits on 185 hectares (460 acres). It is made up of 169,140 photo-voltaic solar panels, capable of generating 50 MW of electricity at maximum capacity. The concession for this project was awarded during the 4th round of the Renewable Energy Independent Power Producer Procurement Programme (REIPPP) of the South African government.

== Ownership ==
The owners of this power station, formed an ad hoc special vehicle (SPV) company called De Wildt Solar (Pty) Limited, to own, design, build, operate and maintain the solar farm. The table below illustrates the shareholding in the SPV company.

Shareholding in De Wildt Solar (Pty) Limited
Rank	Shareholder	Domicile	Notes
1	Zolograph Investments	South Africa	
2	African Infrastructure Investment Managers	South Africa	
3	African Rainbow Energy and Power	South Africa	
4	Reatile Group	South Africa	
5	Phakwe Solar	South Africa	

== Construction ==
The engineering, procurement and construction (EPC) contract was awarded to Cobra Energia, a company based in Spain. The cost of construction is reported as US$92.8 million.

== Timeline ==
Construction started in March 2019. Commercial commissioning was achieved in January 2021.

== See also ==
- List of power stations in South Africa
