= Doornhoek Solar Power Station =

Solar farm in South Africa

- Country: South Africa
- Location: Klerksdorp, Dr Kenneth Kaunda District, North West Province, South Africa
- Coordinates: 26°53′42″S 26°41′30″E
- Status: Proposed
- Construction began: 2024 Expected
- Commission date: H1 2026 Expected
- Construction cost: US$120 million
- Owner: AMEA Power
- Operator: AMEA Power Doornhoek Solar Power Station (South Africa)

Solar farm
- Type: Flat-panel PV

Power generation
- Nameplate capacity: 120 MW
- Annual net output: 325 GWh

The Doornhoek Solar Power Station, is a 120 MW (160,000 hp) solar power station, under development in South Africa. The solar farm is owned and is being developed by AMEA Power LLC, headquartered in the United Arab Emirates. The off-taker is Eskom, the South African national electricity parastatal, under a 20-year power purchase agreement. AMEA Power was awarded the concession to build this solar farm under the sixth round of the South African government's Renewable Energy Independent Power Producer Procurement Programme (REIPPP).

== Location ==
The power station would be located near the town of Klerksdorp, in the Dr Kenneth Kaunda District, in the North West Province of South Africa. Klerksdorp, is located about 172 kilometres (107 mi), southeast of Mahikeng, the provincial capital. The land area hosting the solar farm is reported as 200 hectares (490 acres).

== Overview ==
AMEA Power is a Middle Eastern independent power producer (IPP) active on the African continent focusing on solar generation. This power station is the first for AMEA in South Africa. The design calls for a ground mounted photovoltaic panel layout with generation capacity of 120 megawatts.

== Developers ==
AMEA Power is the lead developer. AMEA has teamed up with two minority shareholders to form the ad hoc joint special purpose vehicle (SPV) company that will own, design, construct, operate and maintain this solar farm. For descriptive purposes we will refer to the SPV company as Doornhoek Solar Consortium, whose composition is as illustrated in the table below.

Ownership of Doornhoek Solar Consortium
Rank	Development Partner	Domicile	Percentage	Notes
1	AMEA Power LLC	United Arab Emirates	51.00	
2	Ziyanda Energy Pty Limited	South Africa	23.25	
3	Dzimuzwo Consulting Pty Limited	South Africa	23.25	
4	Local Community Trust	South Africa	2.50	
			100.00	

== Construction timetable and funding ==
Construction is expected to start in H1 of 2024 and conclude in May 2026. The construction budget is reported to be US$120 million. The development has received financial support in form of loans from Standard Bank of South Africa and from the Industrial Development Corporation of South Africa (IDC).

Financial close was achieved in June 2024. Standard Bank of South Africa loaned US$100 million. The IDC lent US$8 million. AMEA Power is expected to raise US$12 million to bring the total funding to the budgeted $120 million.

== Other considerations ==
This power station is expected to deliver 120 MW of clean renewable electricity, equivalent to 325 GWh on an annual basis, enough to power 97,000 South African homes and to offset 300,000 tonnes of carbon dioxide emissions annually.

== See also ==
- List of power stations in South Africa
