= Dorper Wind Farm =

Wind farm in South Africa

Dorper Wind Power Station
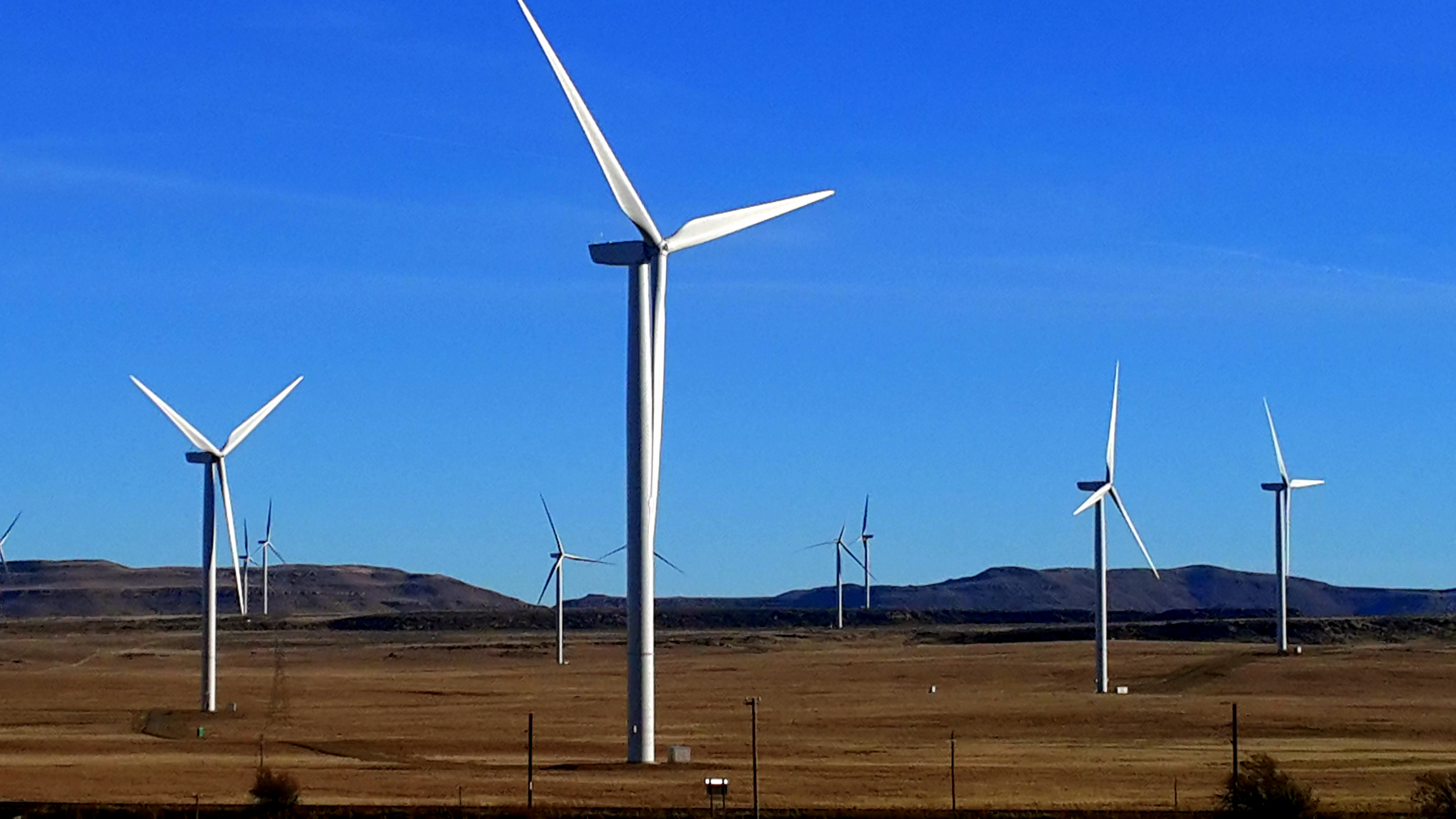
- Dorper Wind Farm in 2014
- Country: South Africa
- Location: Molteno, Eastern Cape; Enoch Mgijima Local Municipality
- Coordinates: 31°28′49″S 26°26′26″E
- Status: Operational
- Construction began: 2018
- Commission date: 2020

Wind farm
- Type: Onshore

Power generation
- Units operational: 40
- Make and model: Nordex N100 2.5MW wind turbines
- Nameplate capacity: 100 MW
- Annual net output: 513 GWh

External links
- Website: dorperwindfarm.co.za

The Dorper Wind Power Station is an operational 100 MW (130,000 hp) wind power plant located in the Eastern Cape province in South Africa.

Commercial operations of the power station has started in 2014, and the energy generated is sold to the South African national electricity utility company Eskom, under a 20-year power purchase agreement (PPA).

== Location ==
The power station is located near Molteno, in the Enoch Mgijima Local Municipality, in the Eastern Cape Province.

== Overview ==
The power station is made of 40 wind turbines of the Nordex N100 variety, each rated at 2.5 megawatts for total capacity of 100 MW.

== Developers ==
The power station was developed and is owned by a consortium of international IPPs and financiers. The power station was built, funded and is operated by a consortium referred made of Sumitomo Corporation and Rainmaker Energy.

== See also ==
- List of power stations in South Africa
