= Seriti Wind Power Station =

Wind farm in South Africa

- Country: South Africa
- Location: New Denmark, Lekwa Local Municipality, Gert Sibande District, Mpumalanga Province
- Coordinates: 26°59′08″S 29°18′27″E
- Status: Under construction
- Construction began: February 2024
- Commission date: Q4 2025 Expected
- Construction cost: US$234 million
- Owner: Seriti Green Energy
- Operator: Seriti Green Energy

Wind farm
- Type: Onshore

Power generation
- Nameplate capacity: 155 MW

The Seriti Wind Power Station is a 155 MW (208,000 hp) wind power plant under construction in South Africa. The power station is under development and is owned by Seriti Green Energy, the renewable energy subsidiary of the South African coal mining conglomerate, Seriti Resources. The power generated at this wind farm is intended for use by Seriti Resources in its coal mining operations in South Africa. The power will be transmitted from the wind farm to its destinations by Eskom, the South African electric utility company, under a "wheeling agreement". When completed in 2025 as planned, this will be the largest grid-ready wind power station in South Africa to date.

== Location ==
The power station is located approximately 20 kilometres (12 mi), south of the Seriti Coal Mine in New Denmark, Lekwa Local Municipality, Gert Sibande District, Mpumalanga Province. New Denmark is located approximately 162 kilometres (101 mi) southeast of Johannesburg, the financial capital of South Africa and the largest city in that country.

== Overview ==
The power station has a maximum generation capacity of 155 megawatts. The wind farm is owned by Seriti Green Energy a renewable energy subsidiary of the off-taker, Seriti Resources, a mining conglomerate active in mining coal, which is primarily sold to Eskom, for fueling its coal electricity plants. This power station represents the first phase of a 900 MW pipeline by Seriti Green Energy, of renewable energy power stations under development.

== Construction costs and funding ==
The construction budget is reported as US$234 million (ZAR: 4.44 billion as of 10 February 2024). Financing is provided by Standard Bank and Rand Merchant Bank.

== Other considerations ==
It is expected that the wind farm will provide 800 jobs during the construction phase.

== See also ==
- List of power stations in South Africa
- Wesley–Ciskei Wind Power Station
- Kangnas Wind Power Station
