= Oya Hybrid Power Station =

Hybrid power station in South Africa

- Official name: Oya Energy Hybrid Facility
- Country: South Africa
- Location: Breede Valley, Cape Winelands, Western Cape
- Coordinates: 32°49′23″S 20°17′57″E
- Status: Proposed
- Construction began: H2 2024 expected
- Commission date: H2 2026 expected
- Owner: Oya Energy
- Operator: Oya Energy

Solar farm
- Type: Flat-panel PV

Power generation
- Nameplate capacity: 333 megawatts (447,000 hp)

Oya Hybrid Power Station, also Oya Energy Hybrid Facility, is a hybrid power plant under development in South Africa. The power station comprises a 155 MW (208,000 hp) solar power plant, a 92 MW/242 MWh battery energy storage system (BESS), and an 86 MW wind power plant. The power station is owned and under development by a consortium of four independent energy companies. Under a 20-year power purchase agreement (PPA), the power generated here will be sold to Eskom, the national electricity utility company, for integration into the national grid.

== Location ==
The power station would be located in the Western Cape Province of South Africa, straddling the border with Northern Cape Province, "between the towns of Ceres and Sutherland".

== Overview ==
In 2015, Renewable Energies began planning a stand-alone wind power station. Then a BESS was added. Later, as more equity partners were recruited, a solar power station was also added. Through a synchronized mechanism, the hybrid power station is expected to provide a steady 128 MW of dispatchable power from 5am until 9.30pm every day. The single-point synchronization system is reported to employ AI and machine learning.

== Developers ==
The table below outlines the shareholding in the Oya Energy Hybrid Project. The special purpose vehicle company is Oya Energy.

Oya Energy shareholding
Rank	Shareholder	Domicile	Percentage	Notes
1	Engie	France	35.0	
2	G7 Renewable Energies	South Africa	20.0	
3	Meadows Energy	South Africa	22.5	
4	Perpetua Investment Holdings	South Africa	22.5	
	Total		100.00	

== Timeline ==
The hybrid power station project reached financial close in February 2024. It was expected that construction will begin later that same year.

== See also ==
- List of power stations in South Africa
