= Kelvin Power Station =

Power station in Guateng, South Africa

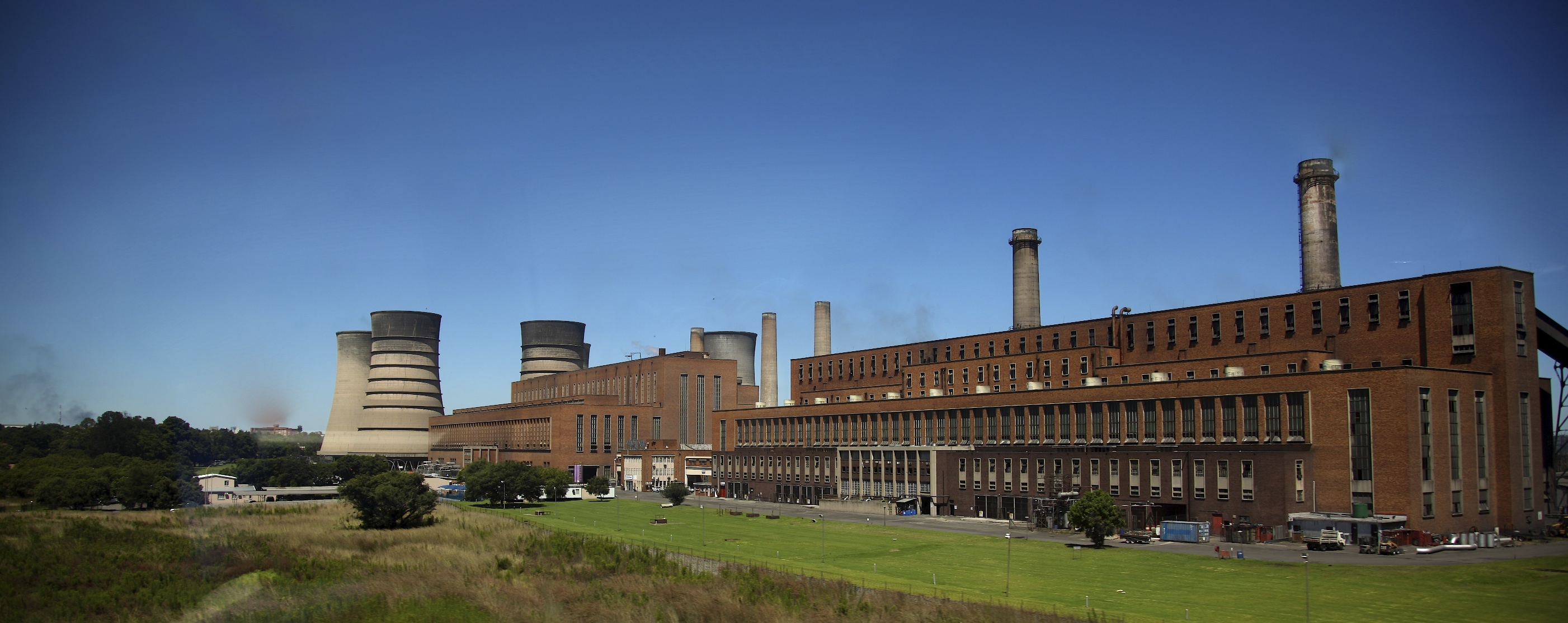
- Kelvin Power Station as seen from the Gautrain
- Location of Kelvin Power Station in South Africa
- Country: South Africa
- Location: Gauteng
- Coordinates: 26°6′58″S 28°11′38″E
- Status: Operational, but not at full output
- Owners: Aldwych International Ltd; Aldwych International Ltd; Public Investment Corporation
- Operator: Aldwych International Ltd

Thermal power station
- Primary fuel: Coal

Power generation
- Nameplate capacity: 420 Megawatt

External links
- Commons: Related media on Commons

Kelvin Power Station is a coal-fired power station, located in Gauteng near OR Tambo International Airport.

Kelvin is one of only a few power stations in South Africa not owned by Eskom. Until 2001 the power station was the property of the City of Johannesburg, but it has since been privatised, resold a number of times, and is currently owned by Investec and Nedbank Capital. Kelvin consist of two independent stations. The A station (shut down in 2012) has six 30 MW generators and 11 chain grate boilers. The newer B station has seven 60 MW generators and seven PF type boilers.

== See also ==
- List of power stations in South Africa
