= Sedibeng Solar Power Station =

Solar farm in South Africa

- Country: South Africa
- Location: Midvaal, Sedibeng, Gauteng
- Coordinates: 26°25′48″S 28°03′48″E
- Status: Operational
- Construction began: October 2021
- Commission date: May 2022
- Owner: SOLA Group
- Operator: SOLA Group

Solar farm
- Type: Flat-panel PV
- Site area: 19 ha (47 acres)

Power generation
- Units operational: 14000
- Nameplate capacity: 6.5 MW (8,700 hp)
- Annual net output: 17.5 GWh

The Sedibeng Solar Power Station is an 6.5 MW solar power plant in South Africa. The solar farm is owned by South African independent power producer (IPP), SOLA Group, which is headquartered in Cape Town. The off-taker of the power generated here is Heineken South Africa, a subsidiary of Heineken N.V., the Dutch beverage conglomerate. The power is used to power manufacturing processes in the Sedibeng Heineken Brewery. A 25-year power purchase agreement (PPA), governs the sale and purchase of electricity between the parties (buyer and seller).

== Location ==
The solar farm sits on 19 hectares (47 acres) of grassland, adjacent to the Heineken Sedibeng Brewery, in Midvaal Local Municipality, in Sedibeng District Municipality, in the Gauteng Province of South Africa. This is approximately 32 kilometres (20 mi) south of Johannesburg, the financial capital of South Africa. The geographical coordinates of the solar farm are: 26°25′48″S, 28°03′48″E (Latitude:-26.430000; Longitude:28.063333).

== Overview ==
The design calls for a ground-mounted solar panel power station with 14,000 solar modules mounted on trackers which follow the movement of the sun to maximize power generation. The transmission network of Eskom Holdings is used to convey the power from the power station to the brewery, as is permissible under South African law.

== Developers ==
Sedibeng Solar Power Station is owned and was developed by Solar Group of South Africa. It was commissioned in May 2022, and is operated and maintained by the Sola Group. It has a projected lifespan of 25 years from commercial commissioning.

== Other considerations ==
During the seven months it took to construct the power station, about 127 jobs were created, of which about 100 were filled by local workers.

== See also ==
- List of power stations in South Africa
