= Loeriesfontein Wind Farm =

Wind farm in South Africa

Loeriesfontein Wind Energy Facility
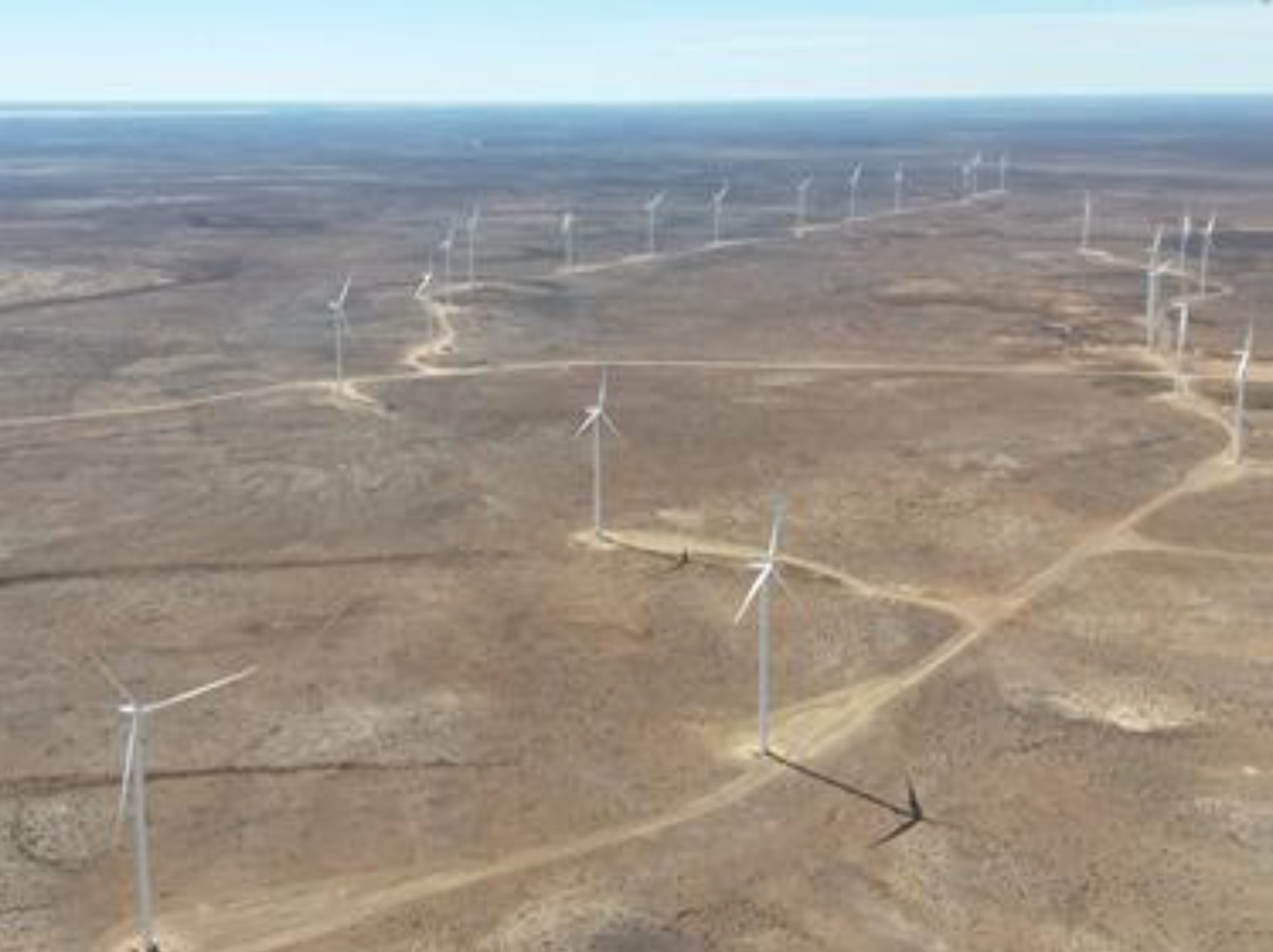
- Country: South Africa
- Location: Hantam Municipality
- Coordinates: 30.404°S 19.589°E
- Status: Commissioned
- Construction began: November 2015
- Commission date: 2017
- Owner: Infinity Power
- Operator: Mainstream Renewable Power

Wind farm
- Type: Onshore

Power generation
- Units operational: 61
- Make and model: Siemens: Permanent Magnet Generator with Gearless Direct Drive Rotor 2.5 MW
- Nameplate capacity: 120MW
- Main Sub-Contractors: Siemens Wind Power (Turbines), Concor & Consolidated Power (Construction)

The Loeriesfontein Wind Energy Facility is a wind farm in the Hantam Municipality, located near Loeriesfontein, in the Northern Cape province of South Africa. Construction began in September 2015 and all the turbines were in place by 28 February 2017. The 140MW Loeriesfontein Wind Farm has a capacity of 535,354 MWh/year.
