= Jeffreys Bay Wind Farm =

Wind farm in South Africa

Jeffrey’s Bay Wind Energy Facility
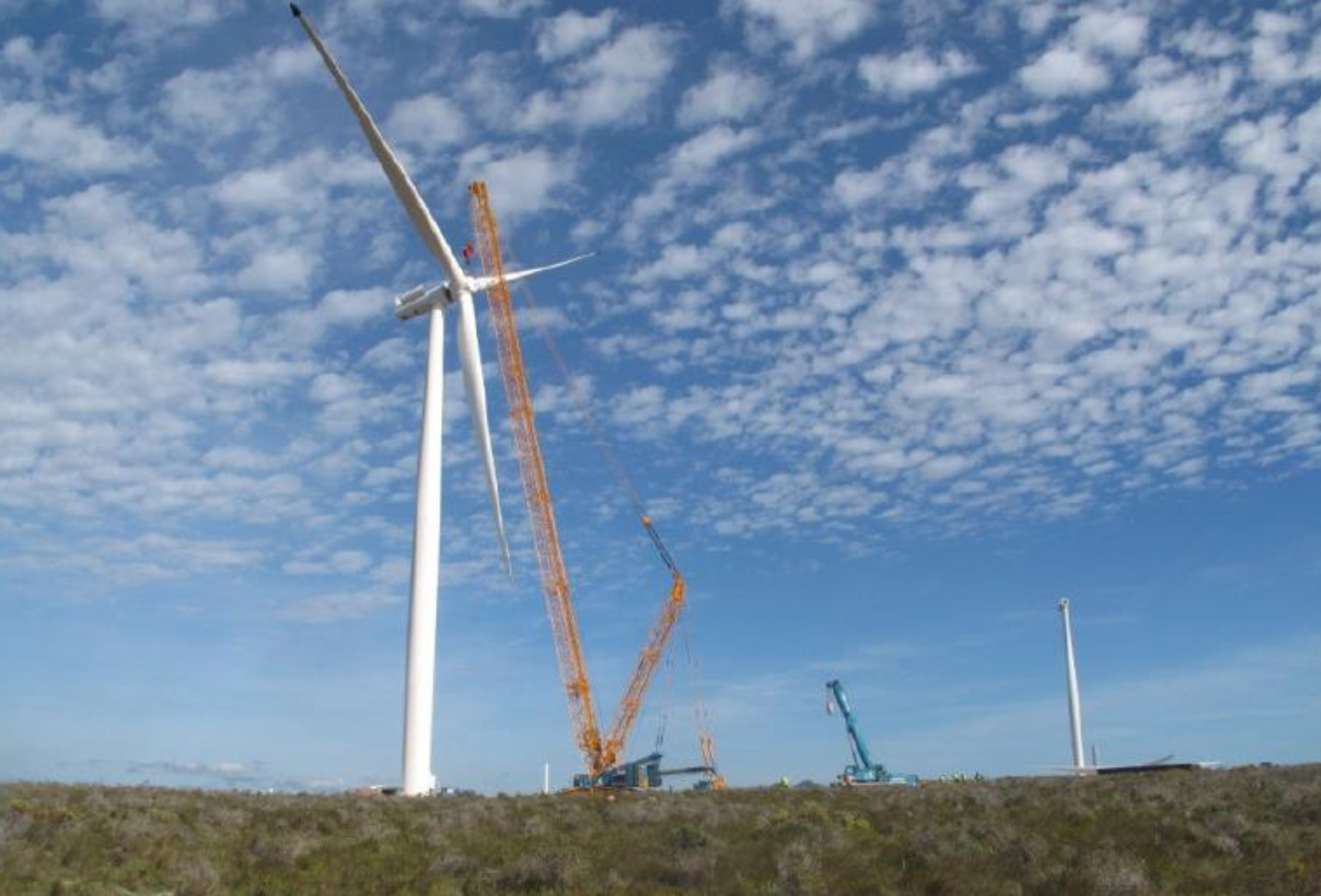
- Country: South Africa
- Location: Kouga Local Municipality
- Coordinates: 34.00°S 24.84°E
- Status: Commissioned
- Construction began: 2012
- Commission date: 2014
- Owners: Globeleq, Mainstream Renewable Power
- Operators: Globeleq, Mainstream Renewable Power

Wind farm
- Type: Onshore

Power generation
- Units operational: 60
- Make and model: Siemens: SWT 2.3MW wind turbines, 80m tall with blades measuring 49m long.
- Nameplate capacity: 138MW
- Main Sub-Contractors: Siemens (Turbines), Concor and Conco (Construction), Actom MV (Switchgear) and Deugro (Transportation)

The Jeffrey’s Bay Wind Energy Facility is a wind farm in the Kouga Local Municipality, built between Jeffrey’s Bay and Humansdorp, in the Eastern Cape province of South Africa.

== History ==
The 3,700-hectare (14 sq mi) site was chosen for its onshore wind conditions, flat topography and proximity to an existing 132 kV grid. A 20-year power purchase agreement was signed with Eskom as well as an implementation agreement with the Department of Energy. The project was authorized by the Department of Environmental Affairs in 2011. Placement of turbines began in September 2013, and was completed by March 2014.

Initial operations started in April 2014. In 2014, it was the largest, and one of the first wind farms to reach commercial operation as part of Bid Window 1 of the South African government’s Renewable Energy Power Procurement Programme. wind farm supplies 460,000 MWh annually.
