= Rooiwal Power Station =

Coal-fired power plant near Pretoria, South Africa

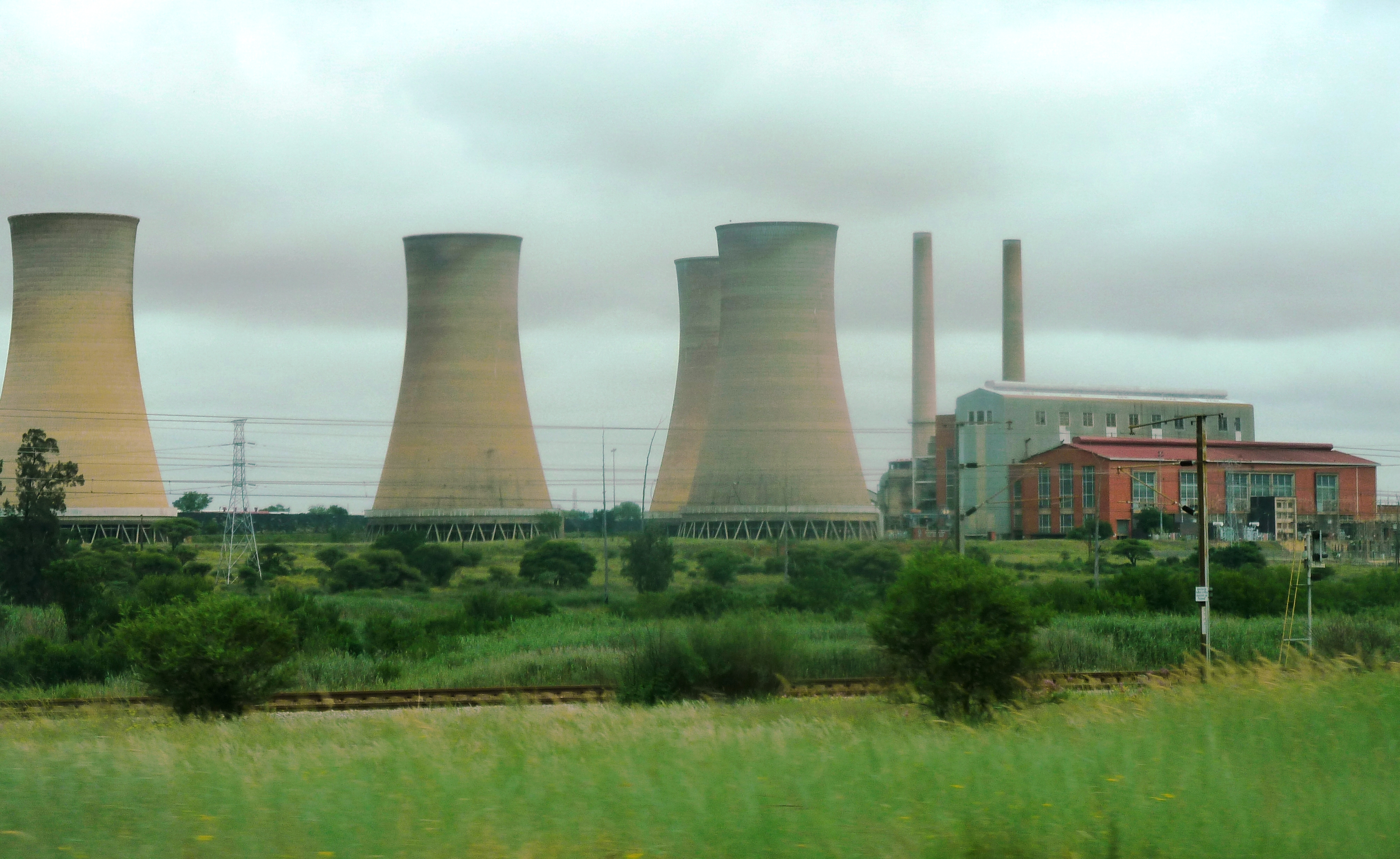
- The power station seen from the R101 route
- Country: South Africa
- Location: Gauteng
- Coordinates: 25.55501°S 28.23757°E
- Status: Not operational since 2012
- Construction began: 1962; 63 years ago
- Owner: City of Tshwane Metropolitan Municipality

Thermal power station
- Primary fuel: Coal

Power generation
- Units operational: 5 x 60 MW
- Nameplate capacity: 300 Megawatt

External links
- Commons: Related media on Commons

Rooiwal Power Station is a 300-megawatt (MW) coal-fired power plant near Pretoria in Gauteng, South Africa.

== History ==
Rooiwal Power Station is a five-unit coal-fired power plant with a total capacity of 300 MW. The plant was completed between 1962 and 1970, and is owned by Tshwane Electricity Division.

In April 2015 the City of Tshwane said it was seeking proposals to renovate two coal-fired power plants to their original design capacity: Pretoria West Power Station and Rooiwal Power Station. Both are operating considerably below their capacity partly because they have been designed to use anthracite, a grade of coal that is more profitable to export.

In 2023, it along with the Pretoria West Power Station were not operational for the past 11 years (despite having a staff of 200 at Rooiwal). R 300 million is spent annually at both power stations for staff and keeping the stations maintained. The City of Tshwane plans to lease out the stations to independent power producers in a 40-year lease.
