= Van Stadens Wind Farm =

Wind farm in South Africa

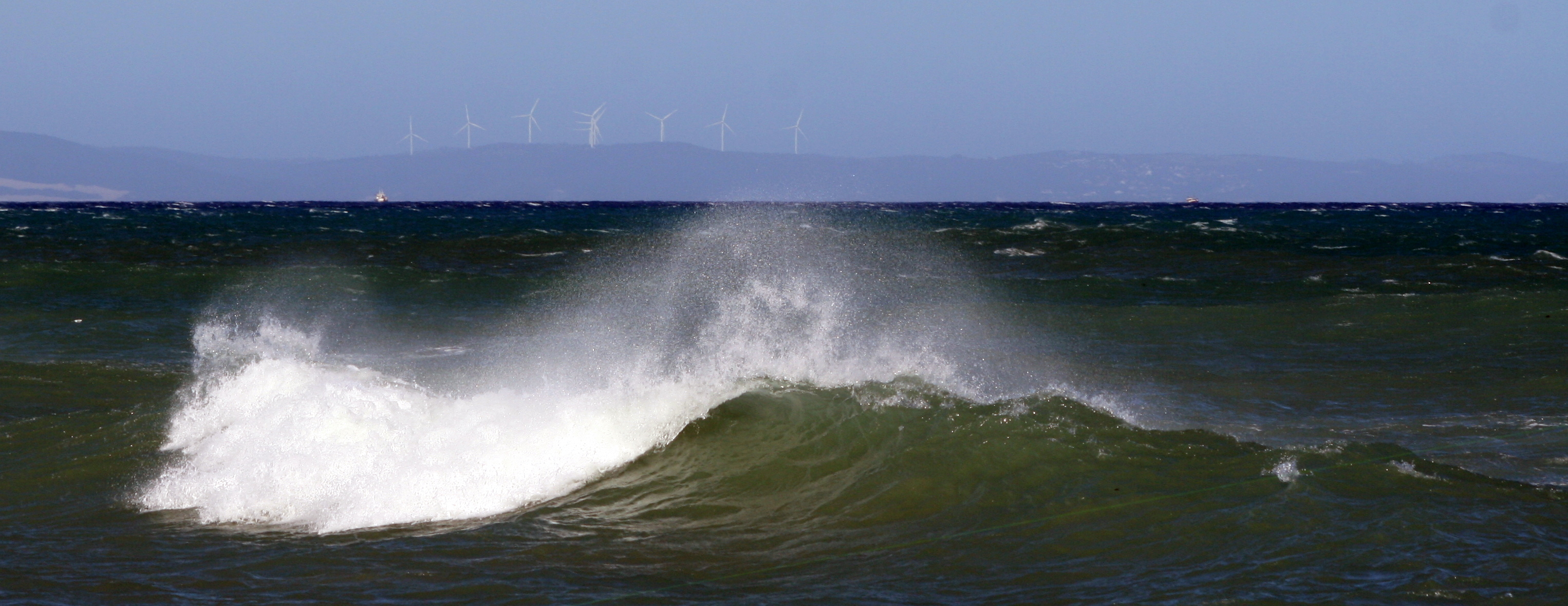
- Van Stadens Wind Farm seen from Aston Bay
- Location of Van Stadens Wind Farm
- Country: South Africa
- Location: Eastern Cape, South Africa
- Coordinates: 33.9615°S 25.2465°E
- Commission date: 2014
- Owner: MetroWind

Wind farm
- Type: Onshore

Power generation
- Units operational: 9
- Nameplate capacity: 27 Megawatt

Construction on Van Stadens Wind Farm outside Port Elizabeth in the Eastern Cape, was started in September 2012. This project was part of Bid Window 1 of the South African government’s Renewable Energy Independent Power Producer Procurement Programme (REIPPPP).

The South African renewable energy company, MetroWind, is proceeding with the R550-million project which will provide power to the Nelson Mandela Bay municipality. The company will construct nine 3-megawatt wind turbines, boosting the local electricity grid, accounting for nearly half the 10 percent renewable energy target planned for Nelson Mandela Bay, and providing power for around 5 000 homes.

In March 2012 South Africa released The Wind Atlas for South Africa, helping to identify other suitable wind energy sites in the Eastern, Western and Northern Cape provinces, and collating some 30 years' of wind data. A website displays wind speed, frequency, direction and estimated power output, and will be regularly updated as new measurements become available. South Africa has excellent wind energy sites located along its coast and in several inland areas. The country plans to produce 42% of all new electricity generation over the next 20 years from renewable sources. At the moment 90% of its energy is from coal, leaving an enormous carbon footprint.

Also participating in the project are the South African Weather Service, the University of Cape Town's Climate System Analysis Group, and the Council for Scientific and Industrial Research. The Technical University of Denmark's wind energy department is also assisting with expertise, while funding is provided by South Africa's Department of Energy, the Danish Embassy in SA, and the UN Development Programme's Global Environment Facility.

== See also ==
- Environmental impact of wind power
