= Excelsior Wind Farm =

Wind farm in South Africa

Excelsior Wind Energy Facility
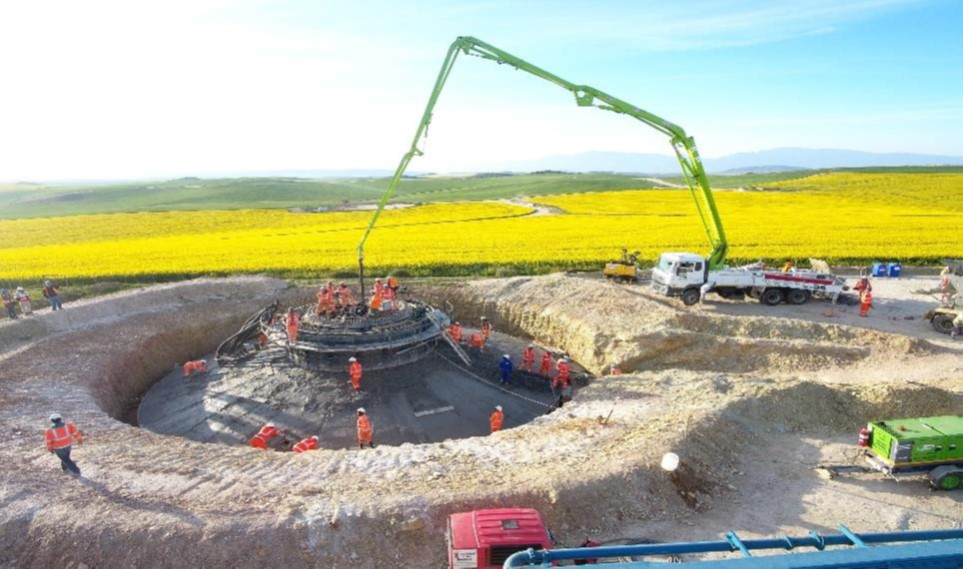
- Country: South Africa
- Location: Swellendam Local Municipality
- Coordinates: 34.242°S 20.231°E
- Status: Commissioned
- Construction began: 2018
- Commission date: 2020
- Owner: BioTherm Energy
- Operator: Goldwind

Wind farm
- Type: Onshore

Power generation
- Units operational: 13
- Make and model: Goldwind: Goldwind Permanent Magnet Generator with Gearless Direct Drive Rotor 2.5 MW
- Nameplate capacity: 32,5MW
- Main Sub-Contractors: Concor (Construction)

The Excelsior Wind Energy Facility is a wind farm in the Swellendam Local Municipality, built 30km southwest of the town of Swellendam, in the Western Cape province of South Africa.

== Planning and approval ==
The project was awarded under the South African Renewable Energy Independent Power Producers Programme (REIPPPP) bid window 4 in 2015 and reached financial close in 2018.

The project comprises 13 Gold Wind 2.5MW permanent magnetic direct drive turbines. The project covers an area of 2,300ha. Excelsior reached commercial operation in December 2020. It can generate 132GWh annually.
