= Perdekraal Wind Farm =

Wind farm in South Africa

- Country: South Africa
- Location: Witzenberg Municipality (Cape Winelands District Municipality)
- Coordinates: 33.056°S 20.109°E
- Status: Commissioned
- Construction began: November 2018
- Commission date: 2021
- Owner: Infinity Power
- Operator: Mainstream

Wind farm
- Type: Onshore

Power generation
- Units operational: 48
- Make and model: Siemens: Permanent Magnet Generator with Gearless Direct Drive Rotor 2.5 MW
- Nameplate capacity: 107.76 MW
- Main Sub-Contractors: Siemens Gamesa (Turbines), Concor & Conco (Construction)

The Perdekraal Wind Farm is a wind farm in the Witzenberg Municipality, built in the Western Cape province of South Africa.

== Planning and approval ==
The wind farm covers an area of 3055 hectares and was chosen because of its good wind conditions and proximity to national roads for wind turbine transportation. The wind farm formed part of the South Africa Renewable Energy Independent Power Producer Programme (REIPPP), and was awarded within the REIPPP bid window round 4.

== Funding and construction ==
The construction of the plant began in November 2018, and the wind farm achieved its first connection to the South African electrical grid in January 2021.

== Activation ==
When operating at full capacity, Perdekraal Wind Farm will generate around 368.8 GWh/year of clean renewable energy per year and is expected to supply electricity to power up to 111 118 South African homes.
