= Khobab Wind Farm =

Wind farm in South Africa

- Country: South Africa
- Location: Hantam Municipality, Namakwa District Municipality
- Coordinates: 30.437°S 19.531°E
- Status: Commissioned
- Construction began: November 2018
- Commission date: 2017
- Owner: Infinity Power
- Operator: Mainstream

Wind farm
- Type: Onshore

Power generation
- Units operational: 61
- Make and model: Siemens: Permanent Magnet Generator with Gearless Direct Drive Rotor 2.5 MW
- Nameplate capacity: 140MW
- Main Sub-Contractors: Siemens Gamesa (Turbines), Concor & Conco (Construction)

The Khobab Wind Farm is a wind farm in the Hantam Municipality, built in the Northern Cape province of South Africa.

== Planning and approval ==
The Khobab Wind Farm was contracted under the South African Government’s Round 3 Renewable Energy Independent Power Producer Procurement Programme. Situated in the Hantam Municipal Area, 60km north of Loeriesfontein in the Northern Cape, Khobab Wind Farm spans 3,453 hectares of agricultural land and comprises sixty-one 99m-high wind turbines. The site was chosen because of its excellent wind resource, its proximity to national roads for wind turbine transportation, the favourable construction conditions, municipality and local stakeholder support, the straightforward electrical connection into the Eskom grid, and studies showed that there would be little environmental impact.

== Funding and construction ==
The construction of the plant began in November 2015, and the wind farm achieved its first connection to the South African electrical grid in 2017.

== Activation ==
The 140MW Khobab Wind Farm generates around 563,500 MWh/year of clean renewable energy per year and supply electricity to power up to 170 000 South African homes. The facility achieved commercial operation in December 2017.
