= Devenish =

Devenish may refer to:

== Places ==
- Devenish, Victoria, a town in Australia
- Devenish Island, an island in Northern Ireland
- A civil parish in Magheraboy, County Fermanagh, Northern Ireland

== People ==
- Charlie Devenish (1874–1922), South African rugby union player
- Cristian Devenish (born 2001), Colombian footballer
- Desmond Devenish, English-American filmmaker
- Myrtle Devenish (1913–2007), British film actress
- Olivia Mariamne Devenish (1771–1814), British socialite
- Robert Devenish (disambiguation), several people
- Ross Devenish (born 1939), South African film director
- Tiger Devenish (1867–1928), South African rugby union player
- Tony Devenish, English politician

== Sport ==
- Devenish Chase, a horse race in Ireland
- Devenish Football Club, an Australian Rules football club that competed in the Benalla & District Football League

== Others ==
- Devenish Brewery, a brewery in Weymouth, Dorset, England
- Devenish College, a secondary school located in Enniskillen, County Fermanagh, Northern Ireland

== See also ==
- Devonish (disambiguation)
