= Nicolls =

Nicolls is a surname. Notable people with the surname include:

- Augustine Nicolls (1559–1616), English judge
- Edward Nicolls (c. 1779–1865), Anglo-Irish officer of the Royal Marines
- Edward Hugh Dyneley Nicolls, British colonial official and engineer
- George Nicolls (1884–1942), Irish politician and solicitor
- Gerald Nicolls (1862–1937), British clergyman
- Jasper Nicolls (1778–1849), British general
- Jasper Hume Nicolls (1818–1877), Canadian Anglican priest
- Francis Nicolls (1586–1642), English politician
- Oliver Nicolls (c. 1740–1829), British Army officer
- Richard Nicolls (c. 1624–1672), English military officer and colonial administrator
- Thomas Nicolls, English politician
- Victoria Nicolls, (born 1954), Australian actress and television personality
