= Nicolls baronets =

Extinct baronetcy in the Baronetage of England

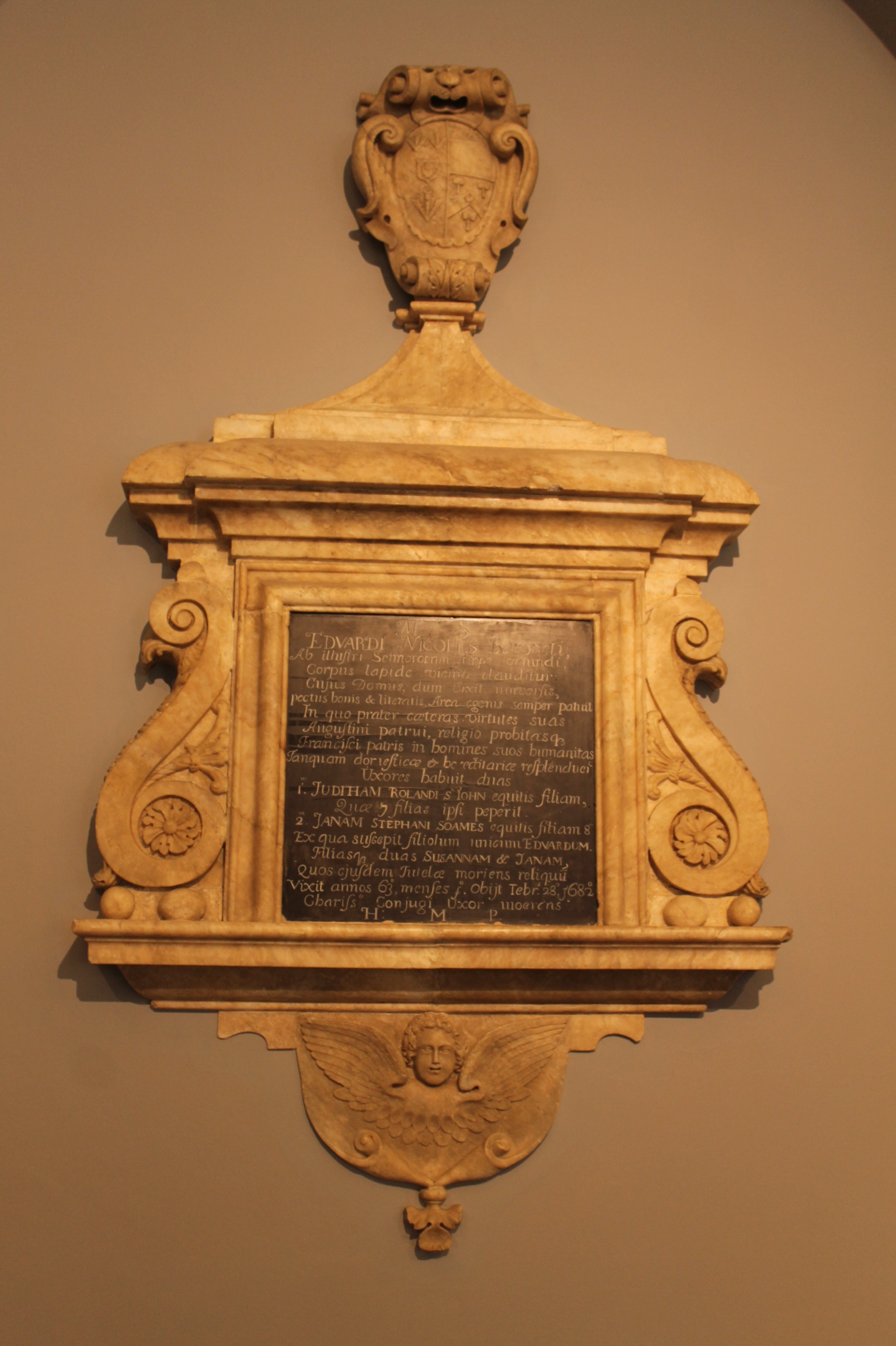
Tomb of Sir Edward Nicolls (d.1682) from Faxton church; now in the Victoria and Albert Museum

The Nicolls Baronetcy, of Hardwick in the County of Northampton, was a title in the Baronetage of England. It was created on 28 July 1641 for Francis Nicolls, previously Member of Parliament for Bishop's Castle and Northamptonshire. The title became extinct on the death of the third Baronet in 1717.

Sir Augustine Nicolls, a Judge of the Court of Common Pleas, was the uncle of the first Baronet.

== Nicolls baronets, of Hardwick (1641) ==
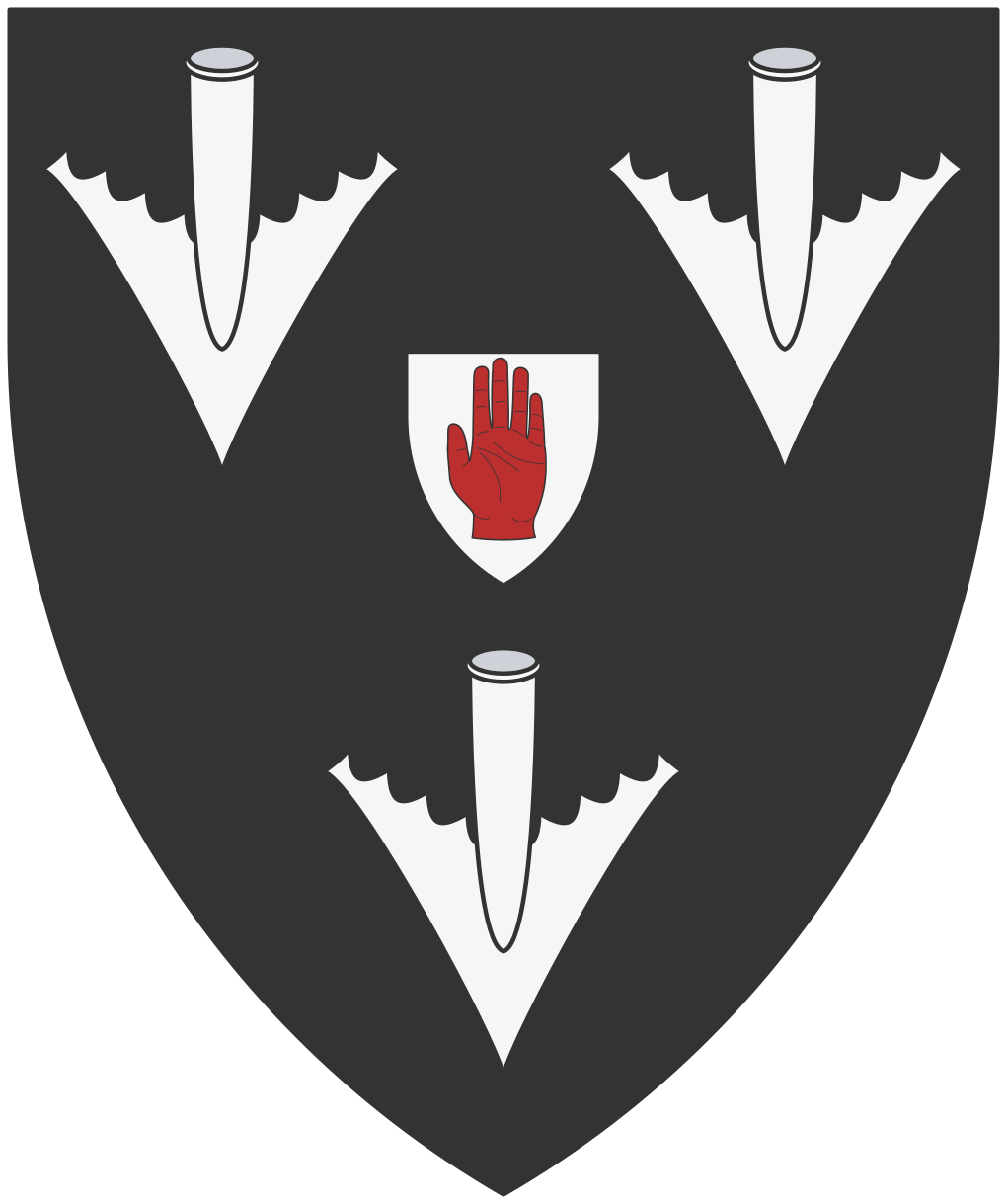
The coat of arms of Nicolls of Hardwick, Baronets.

(sometimes spelt Nichols)

- Sir Francis Nicolls, 1st Baronet (c. 1587–1642)
- Sir Edward Nicolls, 2nd Baronet (1619 – 1682)
- Sir Edward Nicolls, 3rd Baronet (died 1717)
