= List of heritage sites in Victoria West =

This is a list of the heritage sites in Victoria West (Pixley ka Seme District Municipality) as recognised by the South African Heritage Resources Agency.

SAHRA identifier	Site name	Description	Town	District	NHRA status	Coordinates	Image
9/2/100/0002-002	91 Church Street, Victoria West	Semi-detached three-bay Karoo-type cottage with moulded parapet. Verandah with a straight roof on square pillars and dipped walls. Modern, two-panelled glazed door and steel windows. This cottage has been spoilt but is part of a pair and is of environmental value. Intrinsic architectural merit. Type of site: House. Current use: Residential house	Victoria West	Victoria West	Register	31°24′08″S 23°06′21″E	Upload Photo
9/2/100/0002-003	2 Daniel Hugo Street, Victoria West	Three-bay house with high hipped roof with ridge crest. Verandah with ogee roof on face brick pillars and wall with tiles on top. House wall has ashlar imitation. Edwardian-type door and three-unit windows. On sides are 2x2 sash windows with louvered shutters. Intrinsic architectural merit. Type of site: House. Current use: Residential house	Victoria West	Victoria West	Register	31°24′08″S 23°06′52″E	Upload Photo
9/2/100/0002-010	11 Voortrekker Street, Victoria West	Edwardian-type corner house with low-pitched hipped roof and gabled wing in Voortrekker St. Concavo-convex Cape Dutch Revival gable with half-round bay window. Set-back verandah under the main roof on two sides, concrete pillars with arched openings. Intrinsic architectural merit. Type of site: House; Current use: Residential house	Victoria West	Victoria West	Register	31°24′15″S 23°07′02″E	Upload Photo
9/2/100/0002-019	19 Maeder Street, Victoria West	3+1 bay extended cottage with saddle-roof and stoop. Extension on left has large steel window and modern door. The original part has four-panelled door with two-paned fanlight, 2x2-paned sash windows with louvered shutters. Surrounded door and windows. Intrinsic architectural merit. Type of site: House; Current use: Residential house	Victoria West	Victoria West	Register	31°24′11″S 23°07′14″E	Upload Photo
9/2/100/0002-021	83 Church Street, Victoria West	Long four-bay house with saddle-roof and two covered front gables with loft doors. Front verandah with concave roof on precast pillars and high stoop. Right part of verandah has probably been removed and a new door and steps added. Central half-glazed door. Intrinsic architectural merit. Type of site: House; Current use: Residential house	Victoria West	Victoria West	Register	31°24′10″S 23°06′24″E	Upload Photo
9/2/100/0002-022	87 Church Street, Victoria West	Three-bay long saddle-roofed house with straight verandah on precast pillars and straight front wall with inset balusters. Loft door on left end-gable but no stairs. 2x2-panelled (upper ones arched) double door with fanlight. 6x6-paned sash windows. Type of site: House. Current use: Residential: House. Intrinsic architectural merit	Victoria West	Victoria West	Register	31°24′09″S 23°06′23″E	Upload Photo
9/2/100/0002-023	109 Church Street, Victoria West	Karoo-type three bay house with pedimented parapet with edge-moulding and cornice. Verandah has ogee roof on square pillars and step-dipped walls. 2x2-panelled double door with upper panels arched and three-paned fanlight. Windows have louvred shutters. Type of site: House. Current use: Residential: House. Intrinsic architectural merit	Victoria West	Victoria West	Register	31°24′08″S 23°06′21″E	Upload Photo
9/2/100/0002-024	89 Church Street, Victoria West	Karoostyle house with parapeted clay roof. Three-bay type cottage with stepped parapet with fine edge-moulding and heavy cornice. Pilasters at corners as well as around the door, eyebrow mouldings over door and windows. 3x3-panelled (top panels small) double door. Photo by Christo Vosloo.	Victoria West	Victoria West	Register	31°24′09″S 23°06′22″E	Karoostyle house with parapeted clay roof. Three-bay type cottage with stepped parapet with fine edge-moulding and heavy cornice. Pilasters at corners as well as around the door, eyebrow mouldings over door and windows. 3x3-panelled (top panels small) double door. Photo by Christo Vosloo.
9/2/100/0002-026	28 Church Street, Victoria West	Corner house with hipped roof and verandah on both streets. Verandah has straight roof on square pillars and dipped walls. Four-panelled (top ones arched) door and plain fanlight. Also a side entrance with French door. 2x2-paned sash windows. Type of site: House. Current use: Residential: House. Intrinsic architectural merit	Victoria West	Victoria West	Register	31°24′14″S 23°07′01″E	Upload Photo
9/2/100/0002-027	5 Maeder Street, Victoria West	Long three-bay house with saddle-roof covering the end-gables. Finial at one end of the roof and a small, later dormer window to the right. Full verandah under ogee roof on precast pillars with straight front wall, drip fretwork under the roof and trellis. Type of site: House. Previous use: Residential: House. Current use: Residential: House. Intrinsic architectural merit	Victoria West	Victoria West	Register	31°24′16″S 23°06′36″E	Upload Photo
9/2/100/0002-028	15 Maeder Street, Victoria West	Long three-bay house with saddle-roof covering end-gables. Concave verandah roof continuing the main roof rests on square rusticated pillars and straight front walls tiled on top. Edwardian-type glazed double door with two-paned fanlight. Type of site: House. Current use: Residential: House. Intrinsic architectural merit	Victoria West	Victoria West	Register	31°24′16″S 23°06′35″E	Upload Photo
9/2/100/0002-029	Brinkman Street, Victoria West	Isolated on the slope of the hill. Has been renovated but is unoccupied. Three-bay house on a very high foundation with high saddle-roof covering end-gables. Verandah on two sides with ogee roof on precast pillars and straight front walls. Type of site: House. Current use: Residential: House. Intrinsic architectural merit	Victoria West	Victoria West	Register	31°24′09″S 23°06′15″E	Upload Photo
9/2/100/0002-030	93 Church Street, Victoria West	Long five-bay saddle-roofed house with shouldered and edge-moulded end-gables. Loft door on right gable but no stairs. Verandah with ogee roof on square pillars and dipped walls with inset balusters. Right end of verandah enclosed with a window. Type of site: House. Current use: Residential: House. Intrinsic architectural merit	Victoria West	Victoria West	Register	31°24′08″S 23°06′21″E	Upload Photo
9/2/100/0002-031	95 Church Street, Victoria West	Five-bay saddle-roofed house with roof that covers the end-gables. Verandah with straight roof on square pillars and straight front walls. Four-panelled central door with eight-paned fanlight and a French door on the left with louvred shutters (closed). Type of site: House. Current use: Residential: House. Intrinsic architectural merit	Victoria West	Victoria West	Register	31°24′07″S 23°06′20″E	Upload Photo
9/2/100/0002-032	22 Malan Street, Victoria West	Three-bay Karoo type cottage with stepped parapet. Fine verandah with ogee roof on trellis supports with railing of trelliswork and drip-fretwork above. 2x2-panelled double door (upper panels arched) with plain fanlight. Front windows of steel. Type of site: House. Current use: Residential: House. Intrinsic architectural merit	Victoria West	Victoria West	Register	31°24′11″S 23°07′14″E	Upload Photo
9/2/100/0002-033	4 Hoek Street, Victoria West	Three-bay hipped-roofed cottage. Verandah with striped (blue and grey) ogee roof on trelliswork friezes and supports with dipped verandah wall possibly more recent. Four-panelled door (upper ones arched) with two-paned fanlight. 2x2-paned sash windows. Type of site: House. Current use: Residential: House. Intrinsic architectural merit	Victoria West	Victoria West	Register	31°24′11″S 23°07′14″E	Upload Photo
9/2/100/0002-034	2 Kempen Street, Victoria West	Karoo-type three-bay cottage with an extension, formerly a garage. Pedimented parapet with moulded cornice. Four-panelled door with upper panels arched and four-paned fanlight. 2x2-paned sash windows with louvred shutters. Type of site: House. Current use: Residential: House. Intrinsic architectural merit	Victoria West	Victoria West	Register	31°24′09″S 23°06′22″E	Upload Photo
9/2/100/0002-035	7 De Wet Street, Victoria West	Edwardian house built in 1903 with two wings and hipped roofs. The main roof has finials and gable vents. Verandah on two sides between the wings has straight roof of square pillars and straight front walls. Gables of the wings have barge-boarding. Type of site: House. Current use: Residential: House. Intrinsic architectural merit	Victoria West	Victoria West	Register	31°24′23″S 23°07′14″E	Upload Photo
9/2/100/0002-037	13 Maeder Street, Victoria West	Four-bay house (probably an extended three-bay cottage) with saddle-roof covering end-gables. Verandah with concave roof on facebrick pillars and straight facebrick walls. Six-panelled door and a fanlight with small and large rectangular panes. Type of site: House. Current use: Residential: House. Intrinsic architectural merit	Victoria West	Victoria West	Register	31°24′16″S 23°06′36″E	Upload Photo
9/2/100/0002-038	Municipal offices, 84B Church Street, Victoria West	Late Victorian/Edwardian-style commercial building with hipped roof with central lantern. Two wings with plain gables with some mouldings and circular vents. Verandah with central arch with rusticated square pillars. Arched entrance with glazed door unit. Type of site: Commercial. Current use: Commercial: Bank. Intrinsic architectural merit	Victoria West	Victoria West	Register	31°24′13″S 23°06′35″E	Upload Photo
9/2/100/0002-044	Old Victoria West Primary School, Auret Street, Victoria West	Earlier a school, now a private house. A long building with two side wings and a central wing. The saddle-roof has a central vent lantern. The gables are covered. Central gable has a pointed vent and covered porch with a two-panelled door. Type of site: School. Current use: Residential. A simple but fine building which could be investigated for proclamation.	Victoria West	Victoria West	Register	31°24′17″S 23°06′38″E	Upload Photo
9/2/100/0002-049	72 Church Street, Victoria West	Four-bay shop building, Karoo-type with straight parapet. Striped ogee verandah roof over stoep. Left half has a shop facade, right half has a door with small-paned fanlight and window with solid shutters (closed). A good example of a small Karoo-type. Type of site: Commercial. Current use: Commercial: Shop. Intrinsic architectural merit	Victoria West	Victoria West	Register	31°24′13″S 23°06′39″E	Upload Photo
9/2/100/0002-050	96, 98 and 100 Church Street, Victoria West	Long saddle-roofed corner building. Two short wings in front with covered end-gables with finials. Main end-gable on the side street is covered and has a five-sided bay window with three 1x1-paned sash windows, plaster decor and roof. Type of site: Commercial. Current use: Commercial: Shop. Intrinsic architectural merit	Victoria West	Victoria West	Register	31°24′12″S 23°06′30″E	Upload Photo
9/2/100/0002-051	Town Hall, 65 Church Street, Victoria West	Hall building with concave-convex end-gables of Cape Dutch Revival type. Street facade is set back with a water feature and consists of two wings with concave-convex gables with semi-circular vents and fine edge-mouldings, two high narrow windows. W. G. Fagg of Cape Town was the architect. Type of site: Town Hall. Current use: Civic – Town Hall. Of architectural and cultural value	Victoria West	Victoria West	Register	31°24′14″S 23°06′34″E	Upload Photo
9/2/100/0002-052	Prison, Prison Street, Victoria West	The prison stands on the opposite side of the river and was built in 1897 in local stone (Ashlarwork). Front centre has a three-bay Karoo-type building with stepped and moulded parapet with cornice. Two corners have plastered quoins and the door and window Prison built in 1897 in local stone (Ashlarwork). Type of site: Gaol. Current use: Civic: Prison. Intrinsic architectural merit	Victoria West	Victoria West	Register	31°24′08″S 23°06′42″E	Upload Photo
9/2/100/0002-054	Powder Magazine, Helpmekaar Street, Victoria West	A simple barrel-vault structure with an iron-clad door. Of local architectural and cultural value. Type of site: Powder magazine. Previous use: Powder magazine. Current use: Vacant. Intrinsic architectural merit	Victoria West	Victoria West	Register	31°24′18″S 23°07′07″E	Upload Photo
9/2/100/0002-055	19 Parkes Street, Victoria West	Double storeyed, flat-roofed warehouse with short end towards street. Stepped and edge-moulded parapet. Cornice on long facade. Street front has large warehouse door with window with louvred shutters above it. Two crossed stress-irons on the street side. Type of site: Commercial. Current use: Commercial: Warehouse. Intrinsic architectural merit	Victoria West	Victoria West	Register	31°24′12″S 23°06′42″E	Upload Photo
9/2/100/0002-058	4 Cypress Street, Victoria West	Three-bay saddle-roofed house with covered end-gables. Ogee verandah roof runs off main roof and rests on precast pillars on plinths and low straight front walls. Verandah has diamond end-windows. Four-panel door with eight-paned fanlight. Type of site: House. Current use: Residential: House. Intrinsic architectural merit	Victoria West	Victoria West	Register	31°24′12″S 23°06′22″E	Upload Photo
9/2/100/0002-065	4 Parkes Street, Victoria West	Four-bay Karoo-type building with fine moulded parapet and drip-moulding over the four French doors, each with three-paned fanlights. This pleasant building is in disrepair but must originally have been of some importance and it should be restored. Type of site: Building. Current use: Commercial. Intrinsic architectural merit	Victoria West	Victoria West	Register	31°24′12″S 23°06′44″E	Upload Photo
9/2/100/0002-070	79 Church Street, Victoria West	The hall on the corner of the large property has half-hipped roof with ventilation gablets. Gable end in Church Street has wooden porch with triangular roof, 3x3-panel double door with pointed arch and pointed window on each side. Current use: Religious: Parsonage and Community Hall. Intrinsic architectural merit	Victoria West	Victoria West	Register	31°24′12″S 23°06′26″E	The hall on the corner of the large property has half-hipped roof with ventilation gablets. Gable end in Church Street has wooden porch with triangular roof, 3x3-panel double door with pointed arch and pointed window on each side. Current use: Religious: Parsonage and Community Hall. Intrinsic architectural merit
9/2/100/0002-074	Methodist Church, 1 Brinkman Street, Victoria West	Three-bay saddle-roofed Victorian-type building. Verandah has a straight roof on plastered brick pillars and arches. 2x2-panelled double door (top panels arched), with arched four-paned fanlight. Arched side-hung windows with small panes. Type of site: Church. Current use: Religious. A very striking building of local architectural and cultural value.	Victoria West	Victoria West	Register	31°24′18″S 23°06′29″E	Upload Photo
9/2/100/0002-076	89B Church Street, Victoria West	Semi-detached three-bay Karoo-type cottage with stepped, edge-moulded parapet. Verandah with ogee roof on square pillars and straight front walls. French door with two-paned fanlight. 2x2-paned sash windows. A neat cottage of local architectural value. Type of site: House. Current use: Residential: House. Intrinsic architectural merit	Victoria West	Victoria West	Register	31°24′08″S 23°06′22″E	Upload Photo
9/2/100/0002-077	10 Fraser Street, Victoria West	Simple three-bay Karoo-type cottage with heavy cornice and stone stoep. Plaster mouldings at corners. Four-panelled door with three-paned fanlight and old 6x6-paned sash windows. Broad plaster surround at door, narrower surrounds at windows. Type of site: House. Current use: Residential: House. Intrinsic architectural merit	Victoria West	Victoria West	Register	31°24′12″S 23°06′57″E	Upload Photo
9/2/100/0002-078	111 Church Street, Victoria West	Large five-bay house with high saddle roof, gables covered. Loft door on right gable, no stairs. Verandah with ogee roof on precast pillars and straight front walls with tiled tops. 2x2-panelled front double door with five-paned fanlight. Type of site: House. Current use: Residential: House. Intrinsic architectural merit	Victoria West	Victoria West	Register	31°24′03″S 23°06′13″E	Upload Photo
9/2/100/0002-079	5 Fraser Street, Victoria West	Three-bay cottage with hipped roof, of same type as 97 above. Verandah with straight roof on precast pillars and dipped stepped front walls. 2x2-panelled (upper ones arched) double door with three-paned fanlight. 6x6-paned sash windows. Not in good condition. Type of site: House. Current use: Residential: House. Intrinsic architectural merit	Victoria West	Victoria West	Register	31°24′13″S 23°06′57″E	Upload Photo
9/2/100/0002-080	12 New Street, Victoria West	Three-bay Karoo-type cottage with edge-moulded stepped and pedimented parapet and cornice. Verandah with a bullnose roof (rare for the town) on square pillars and slightly dipped walls. Modern door and modern steel windows. Type of site: House. Current use: Residential: House. Intrinsic architectural merit	Victoria West	Victoria West	Register	31°24′10″S 23°06′55″E	Upload Photo
9/2/100/0002-081	10 Daniel Hugo Street, Victoria West	Small three-bay cottage with saddle-roof between shouldered end-gables with mock chimneys and edge-mouldings. Loft door on right gable. Plain door and window surrounds. Edwardian-type half-glazed door with four-paned fanlight. Louvered shutters (closed). Type of site: House. Current use: Residential: House. Intrinsic architectural merit	Victoria West	Victoria West	Register	31°24′11″S 23°06′52″E	Upload Photo
9/2/100/0002-082	3 Hugo Street, Victoria West	Four-bay Karoo-type house with stepped edge-moulded parapet and cornice. Verandah with ogee roof on wooden posts and straight front walls. Drip fretwork under verandah edge. Half-glazed door with three-paned fanlight and 6x6-paned sash windows. Type of site: House. Current use: Residential: House. Intrinsic architectural merit	Victoria West	Victoria West	Register	31°24′10″S 23°06′53″E	Upload Photo
9/2/100/0002-083	12 Daniel Hugo Street, Victoria West	Three-bay Karoo-type cottage where the parapet has been covered by the flat corrugated-iron roof – possibly a later alteration. Quoins on the corners and plain door surround. 2x2-panelled double door with five-paned fanlight. Type of site: House. Current use: Residential. Cottage is in disrepair and could be restored	Victoria West	Victoria West	Register	31°24′07″S 23°06′52″E	Upload Photo
9/2/100/0002-084	14 Cypress Street, Victoria West	Three-bay saddle-roofed cottage with covered end-gables, finials and loft door. Verandah with hipped low front walls. Front wall of house has imitation ashlar work. Modern glazed door with two-paned fanlight and steel windows. Although spoilt it can be repaired. Type of site: House. Current use: Residential: House. Intrinsic architectural merit	Victoria West	Victoria West	Register	31°24′11″S 23°06′21″E	Upload Photo
9/2/100/0002-085	103 Church Street, Victoria West	Three-bay house with hipped roof with gablet vents and ridge crest. Verandah with ogee roof on square pillars and straight front walls. 2x2-panelled (upper ones arched) double door with two-paned fanlight. Windows have louvred shutters (closed). Type of site: House. Current use: Residential: House. Intrinsic architectural merit	Victoria West	Victoria West	Register	31°24′05″S 23°06′16″E	Upload Photo
9/2/100/0002-087	8 New Street, Victoria West	Three-bay house with hipped roof. Verandah with ogee roof on wooden poles on plinths and very low front walls. Wide 2x2-panelled (upper ones arched) door with plain fanlight. Louvered shutters (closed). Side windows are sashes. Plain surrounds at door. Type of site: House. Current use: Residential: House. Intrinsic architectural merit	Victoria West	Victoria West	Register	31°24′11″S 23°06′55″E	Upload Photo
9/2/100/0002-088	9 Market Street, Victoria West	Well-preserved three-bay house with hipped roof, high walls with corner quoins and rustic plaster. Verandah with hipped ogee roof (red and metal stripes) and trelliswork arched friezes, supports and railings. 3x3-panelled double door. According to a 1909 photo (Rosenthal 1959 p. 53) the house originally had a Karoo type flat roof. Type of site: House. Current use: Residential. This is a very interesting house from and architectural and local cultural point of view.	Victoria West	Victoria West	Register	31°24′11″S 23°06′49″E	Upload Photo
9/2/100/0002-089	1 Victoria Street, Victoria West	Edwardian-type four-bay house with hipped roof and porch with two precast pillars on low walls with razor-blade pattern. Recessed two-panelled door with two-paned fanlight. Side-hung windows with small panes. Splayed steps with low walls lead to the porch. Type of site: House. Current use: Residential: House. Intrinsic architectural merit	Victoria West	Victoria West	Register	31°24′16″S 23°06′38″E	Upload Photo
9/2/100/0002-090	5 Victoria Street, Victoria West	Three-bay saddle-roofed cottage with shouldered and edge-moulded gables, with a loft door. Verandah with concave roof on facebrick pillars and straight walls with wooden gate. Modern door with twelve-paned fanlight. Windows with louvred shutters (closed). Type of site: House. Current use: Residential: House. Intrinsic architectural merit	Victoria West	Victoria West	Register	31°24′15″S 23°06′38″E	Upload Photo
9/2/100/0002-091	2 Fraser Street, Victoria West	Edwardian-type house (built in 1939) with hipped roof and two short wings with Cape Dutch Revival gables. Gables have half-round bay windows and circular vents. Between the wings is a verandah on precast pillars. Two Edwardian-type half-glazed doors. Type of site: House. Current use: Residential: House. Intrinsic architectural merit	Victoria West	Victoria West	Register	31°24′13″S 23°06′58″E	Upload Photo
9/2/100/0002-092	7 Fraser Street, Victoria West	Three-bay cottage with hipped roof. Verandah with straight roof extended from the main roof and resting on two precast pillars and straight front walls; side walls (with diamond windows) extended round front of verandah. Type of site: House. Current use: Residential: House. Intrinsic architectural merit	Victoria West	Victoria West	Register	31°24′12″S 23°06′57″E	Upload Photo
9/2/100/0002-094	97 Church Street, Victoria West	Old three-bay house with shouldered and edge-moulded end-gables. High foundations. Verandah with straight roof on precast pillars and dipped walls with inset balusters. Steps to verandah at left end. 12x12 paned sash windows (small panes). Double door. Type of site: House. Current use: Residential: House. Intrinsic architectural merit	Victoria West	Victoria West	Register	31°24′07″S 23°06′19″E	Upload Photo
9/2/100/0002-103	7 Daniel Hugo Street, Victoria West	A large three-bay house with high saddle-roof (as for thatch) covering the gable ends which may have been adapted to accommodate a corrugated-iron roof. Plaster scalloped pattern below the eaves and drip mouldings over door and windows. Type of site: House. Current use: Residential: House. Outstanding architectural merit	Victoria West	Victoria West	Register	31°24′12″S 23°06′52″E	Upload Photo
9/2/100/0002-105	1 New Street, Victoria West	Three-bay corner cottage with pointed hipped roof with gablet vent. Verandah with ogee roof on trelliswork supports, arched trelliswork friezes and railings. Six-panelled door with three-paned fanlight and 2x2-paned sash windows with louvred shutters. Type of site: House. Current use: Religious. A fine unspoilt cottage of architectural value	Victoria West	Victoria West	Register	31°24′14″S 23°06′54″E	Upload Photo
9/2/100/0002-114	12 Malan Street, Victoria West	Four-bay Karoo-type cottage with stepped parapet, quoins around doors and windows and plain corner surrounds. Four-panelled door with two-paned fanlight and another four-panelled (upper ones arched) door with two-paned fanlight. Two sash windows with louvres. Type of site: House. Current use: Residential: House. Intrinsic architectural merit	Victoria West	Victoria West	Register	31°24′11″S 23°07′14″E	Upload Photo
9/2/100/0002-115	4 Fraser Street, Victoria West	Three-bay cottage with hipped roof similar in style to others in the street (see 97–99). Verandah with ogee roof on square pillars and straight front walls. Glazed 2x2-panelled double door with three-paned fanlight. Windows have louvred shutters (closed). Type of site: House. Current use: Residential: House. Intrinsic architectural merit	Victoria West	Victoria West	Register	31°24′10″S 23°06′57″E	Upload Photo
9/2/100/0002-116	15 Auret Street, Victoria West	3+1-bay extended house, part hipped roof, part saddle-roof. The left end has a simple end-gable. Verandah with ogee roof on pre-cast pillars and straight front walls with razor-blade pattern. Four-panelled door, upper panels arched, and two-paned fanlight. Type of site: House. Current use: Residential: House. Intrinsic architectural merit	Victoria West	Victoria West	Register	31°24′17″S 23°06′49″E	Upload Photo
9/2/100/0002-117	57 Church Street, Victoria West	Fine Victorian house with saddle-roof and two wings with covered end-gables with circular vents and three-sided bays also with circular vents. Another three-sided bay in the set-back part between the gables. No visible entrance in front. High sash windows. Type of site: House. Current use: Residential: House. Intrinsic architectural merit	Victoria West	Victoria West	Register	31°24′15″S 23°06′41″E	Upload Photo
9/2/100/0002-118	3 Brinkman Street, Victoria West	Four-bay house with hipped roof and verandah under the extended roof, with precast pillars on straight walls. Semi-circular bay windows under the verandah with Edwardian-type side-hung windows. French door and fanlight. The house is situated high up above. Type of site: House. Current use: Residential: House. Intrinsic architectural merit	Victoria West	Victoria West	Register	31°24′12″S 23°06′19″E	Upload Photo
9/2/100/0002-119	1 Commercial Street, Victoria West	Three-bay hipped-roofed house with verandah with ogee roof on precast pillars and dipped walls with lozenge-shaped pattern. Half-glazed double door with fanlight. 12x12-paned sash windows with louvred shutters. A well-kept house of local architectural value. Type of site: House. Current use: Residential: House. Intrinsic architectural merit	Victoria West	Victoria West	Register	31°24′16″S 23°06′29″E	Upload Photo
9/2/100/0002-120	5A Parkes Street, Victoria West	Three-bay semi-detached (see 88b) Karoo-type cottage with straight parapet with heavy edge-moulding and heavy drip-moulding over door and windows. Four-panel door with two-paned fanlight. Windows have been removed and the openings boarded up. Type of site: House. Current use: Residential: House. Intrinsic architectural merit	Victoria West	Victoria West	Register	31°24′12″S 23°06′43″E	Upload Photo
9/2/100/0002-121	4 Parsonage Street, Victoria West	Three-bay cottage with pointed hipped roof. Verandah on square pillars and straight front walls. Incorrect half-glazed door with two-paned fanlight. Windows have louvred shutters (closed). According to the owner the cottage is over 100 years old. Type of site: House. Current use: Residential: House. Intrinsic architectural merit	Victoria West	Victoria West	Register	31°24′11″S 23°07′14″E	Upload Photo
9/2/100/0002-122	130 Church Street, Victoria West	Three-bay Karoo-type cottage with pedimented parapet and corner plinths. Verandah has ogee roof, trellis-work supports and railings with drip fretwork above. Four-panelled door with three-paned fanlight and 6x6-paned sash windows with louvred shutters. Type of site: House. Current use: Residential: House. Intrinsic architectural merit	Victoria West	Victoria West	Register	31°24′04″S 23°06′16″E	Upload Photo
9/2/100/0002-123	19 Malan Street, Victoria West	Three-bay cottage with pointed hipped roof. Verandah with straight roof on precast pillars and straight walls with razor-blade decor and wooden gate. Edwardian-type half-glazed door with plain fanlight. Steel windows. A pleasant cottage of a local architect. Type of site: House. Current use: Residential: House. Intrinsic architectural merit	Victoria West	Victoria West	Register	31°24′11″S 23°07′14″E	Upload Photo
9/2/100/0002-124	54 Church Street, Victoria West	Three-bay cottage with hipped roof. Verandah with ogee roof on square pillars with dipped front walls and gate. Six-panelled door with eight-paned fanlight. 6x6-paned sash windows. Heavy frip moulding over door and windows. The cottage is said to have belonged to the Anglican Church. Type of site: House. Current use: Residential: House. Intrinsic architectural merit	Victoria West	Victoria West	Register	31°24′13″S 23°06′46″E	Upload Photo
9/2/100/0002-125	1 Kempen Street, Victoria West	Large three-bay house with hipped roof and wing on left side. Verandah with ogee roof on precast pillars and plinths. Modern door. End of verandah is glazed in. Edwardian-type three-unit windows. Large pleasant garden with palm and wrought-iron fence. Type of site: House. Current use: Residential: House. Intrinsic architectural merit	Victoria West	Victoria West	Register	31°24′10″S 23°06′21″E	Upload Photo
9/2/100/0002-126	3 Fraser Street, Victoria West	Three-bay cottage with low-pitched hipped roof. Verandah with straight roof on square pillars and dipped front walls. On the wall the verandah roof rests on bracketed drip-mouldings. Modern door with two-paned fanlight and windows with louvred shutters. Type of site: House. Current use: Residential: House. Intrinsic architectural merit	Victoria West	Victoria West	Register	31°24′13″S 23°06′57″E	Upload Photo
9/2/100/0002-127	5 Brinkman Street, Victoria West	A fine Edwardian-type house with low-pitched hipped roof and central verandah with straight roof on precast pillars and straight walls with razor-blade decoration painted blue. Glazed door unit. Steel windows with small panes. Type of site: House. Current use: Residential: House. Intrinsic architectural merit	Victoria West	Victoria West	Register	31°24′17″S 23°06′27″E	Upload Photo
9/2/100/0002-128	9 Brinkman Street, Victoria West	Late-Victorian-type mansion with two front gables and high saddle-roof. Gables are covered and have finials and circular vents. Each has a bay window with three 2x2-paned sash windows and a small concave roof. Verandah between the wings with straight roof. Type of site: House. Current use: Residential. A very fine house of architectural value and a good example of its style.	Victoria West	Victoria West	Register	31°24′17″S 23°06′24″E	Upload Photo
9/2/100/0002-129	11 Brinkman Street, Victoria West	Late-Victorian-type mansion with one front gable. The saddle-roof has two triangular gablet vents. A bay window on the gable with 2x2-paned sash windows. Verandah with ogee roof on square pillars which continue down past the high stone foundation. Type of site: House. Current use: Residential: House. Intrinsic architectural merit	Victoria West	Victoria West	Register	31°24′12″S 23°06′18″E	Upload Photo
9/2/100/0002-130	17 Brinkman Street, Victoria West	Late-Victorian or Edwardian-style house on high stone foundations. Roof is low-pitched and hipped. Verandah on two sides with ogee roof on pipes and plinths and a railing. Two bay windows under verandah with 2x2-paned sash windows. Four-panel door. Type of site: House. Current use: Residential: House. Intrinsic architectural merit	Victoria West	Victoria West	Register	31°24′12″S 23°06′18″E	Upload Photo
9/2/100/0002-132	8A, 8B, 8C Parkes Street, Victoria West	A long attached terrace building with three three-bay units and a hipped roof. 8A has been altered with steel windows. 8B and 8C have 6x6-paned sash windows and four-panelled narrow doors with nine-paned fanlights. Plain plaster door and window surrounds. Type of site: House. Current use: Residential: House. Intrinsic architectural merit	Victoria West	Victoria West	Register	31°24′12″S 23°06′44″E	Upload Photo
9/2/100/0002-133	136 Church Street, Victoria West	Three-bay cottage with pointed hipped roof and rather high walls. Verandah has ogee roof with wooden twin supports and trellis railing. 3x3-panelled double door with upper panels arched and three-paned fanlight. 2x2-paned sash windows with louvred shutters. Type of site: House. Current use: Residential: House. Intrinsic architectural merit	Victoria West	Victoria West	Register	31°24′03″S 23°06′14″E	Upload Photo
9/2/100/0002-134	6 Parkes Street, Victoria West	Three-bay semi-detached (see 89 below) Karoo-type cottage with a straight parapet with heavy edge-moulding and very heavy drip-mouldings over the door and windows. Modern door and steel windows. Should be restored. Type of site: House. Current use: Residential: House. Intrinsic architectural merit	Victoria West	Victoria West	Register	31°24′11″S 23°06′46″E	Upload Photo
9/2/100/0002-135	11 New Street, Victoria West	Large two-unit six-bay building with high saddle-roof and two covered front gables with barge boarding, finials and round vents. Long verandah with hipped ogee roof on square pillars and straight front walls. There are four bay windows with 2x2 and 1x1 panes. Type of site: House. Current use: Residential: House. Intrinsic architectural merit	Victoria West	Victoria West	Register	31°24′10″S 23°06′55″E	Upload Photo
9/2/100/0002-136	6 Hugo Street, Victoria West	3+1-bay house with hipped roof with gablet vents. Verandah with straight roof on precast twin pillars on straight front walls. Left end of verandah is glazed in. Edwardian-type glazed door unit and steel windows. This house is of local architectural value. Type of site: House. Current use: Residential: House. Intrinsic architectural merit	Victoria West	Victoria West	Register	31°24′12″S 23°06′52″E	Upload Photo
9/2/100/0002-137	20 Richmond Street, Victoria West	Simple three-bay Karoo-type cottage with stepped parapet and edge-moulding and cornice. Narrow stoep with low end-walls. Four-panelled door with two-paned fanlight and boarded-up windows. This vacant cottage could be restored as it is a good example of its type. Type of site: House. Current use: Residential: House. Intrinsic architectural merit	Victoria West	Victoria West	Register	31°24′09″S 23°07′06″E	Upload Photo
9/2/100/0002-138	6 New Street, Victoria West	Three-bay Karoo-type cottage with stepped and pedimented parapet. Verandah with ogee roof on precast pillars and dipped walls. Four-panelled (upper ones arched) door with two-paned fanlight and louvred shutters (closed). Of some local architectural value. Type of site: House. Current use: Residential: House. Intrinsic architectural merit	Victoria West	Victoria West	Register	31°24′09″S 23°06′55″E	Upload Photo
9/2/100/0002-139	3A Cypress Street, Victoria West	Three-bay saddle-roofed cottage with covered end-gables. Verandah with ogee roof on square rusticated pillars and low front walls; square end-windows. Modern glazed door. Windows with louvred shutters (closed). Loft door on right gable. Type of site: House. Current use: Residential: House. Intrinsic architectural merit	Victoria West	Victoria West	Register	31°24′12″S 23°06′22″E	Upload Photo
9/2/100/0002-141	25 Helpmekaar Street, Victoria West	Three-bay corrugated-iron cottage with high saddle-roof and lean-to part at back with chimney. Crude door with two-paned fanlight. 6x6-paned sash windows. To the right is an old stone wall to the corner of End Street. Type of site: House. Current use: Residential. Of local architectural and cultural value and an interesting example of corrugated iron architecture	Victoria West	Victoria West	Register	31°24′17″S 23°07′15″E	Upload Photo
9/2/100/0002-142	112 Church Street, Victoria West	Extended Karoo-type house with 3+2 bays. Stepped parapet with fine edge-moulding and cornice. Narrow verandah divided with wooden wall; ogee roof on wooden supports with ornamental drip fretwork, wooden railing and gates; one square end-window. French windows. Type of site: House. Current use: Residential: House. Intrinsic architectural merit	Victoria West	Victoria West	Register	31°24′14″S 23°07′11″E	Upload Photo
9/2/100/0002-144	19 Helpmekaar Street, Victoria West	Large Edwardian mansion with hipped roofs, high chimneys, two rounded wings and verandah on two sides supported by twin precast pillars on straight walls with edge-moulding. Edwardian-type entrance with glazed door and side-lights and fanlights. Type of site: House. Current use: Residential: House. Intrinsic architectural merit	Victoria West	Victoria West	Register	31°24′17″S 23°07′15″E	Upload Photo
9/2/100/0002-145	1 Cypress Street, Victoria West	Seven-bay hipped-roof house with a short flat-roofed wing at either end. Verandah between the wings with ogee roof on facebrick pillars and front walls. Probably French doors behind the closed louvred shutters. In the middle is a 3x3-panel double door. Type of site: House. Current use: Residential: House. Intrinsic architectural merit	Victoria West	Victoria West	Register	31°24′12″S 23°06′22″E	Upload Photo
9/2/100/0002-146	3 Goldman Street, Victoria West	Three-bay low-pitched saddle-roofed house with gable end facing the street. Verandah has ogee roof on twin wooden posts with decorative cross connections. Between the posts is a later wrought-iron fence. Door has a twelve-paned fanlight. 6x6-paned sash windows. Type of site: House. Current use: Residential: House. Intrinsic architectural merit	Victoria West	Victoria West	Register	31°24′11″S 23°07′14″E	Upload Photo
9/2/100/0002-147	114 Church Street, Victoria West	Extended four-bay Karoo-type cottage with stepped and slightly pedimented parapet. Verandah has straight roof on square pillars and straight front walls tiled on top. Verandah end-walls have diamond windows. Two plain doors with fanlights. 6x6-paned sash. Type of site: House. Current use: Residential: House. Intrinsic architectural merit	Victoria West	Victoria West	Register	31°24′14″S 23°07′11″E	Upload Photo
9/2/100/0002-148	118 Church Street, Victoria West	Karoo-type semi-detached (to no. 120) cottage with three bays. Stepped parapet with corner plinths. Verandah with ogee roof and trellis-work supports, railing and gates; ornamental drip fretwork above. 2x2-panel double door with twelve-paned fanlight. Type of site: House. Current use: Residential: House. Intrinsic architectural merit	Victoria West	Victoria West	Register	31°24′14″S 23°07′11″E	Upload Photo
9/2/100/0002-149	120 Church Street, Victoria West	Semi-detached (to no. 118) Karoo-type three-bay cottage with stepped and slightly pedimented parapet with edge-mouldings and corner quoins. Verandah has straight roof, square rusticated pillars and straight front walls with tiles on top and razorblade decoration. Type of site: House. Current use: Residential: House. Intrinsic architectural merit	Victoria West	Victoria West	Register	31°24′14″S 23°07′11″E	Upload Photo
9/2/100/0002-150	122 Church Street, Victoria West	Three-bay Karoo-type cottage with pedimented parapet with edge-moulding. Verandah has ogee roof on precast pillars and dipped front walls. 3x3-panelled double door with large and small rectangular panes in fanlight. Left window has louvred shutters. Type of site: House. Current use: Residential: House. Intrinsic architectural merit	Victoria West	Victoria West	Register	31°24′14″S 23°07′11″E	Upload Photo
9/2/100/0002-151	1 Auret Street, Victoria West	Edwardian-type house with pointed hipped roof. Built-in verandah with square pillars and dipped walls tiled on top. On left side is a bay window with Edwardian side-hung windows. A set-back porch with half-glazed door. 6x6-paned sash windows on side. Type of site: House. Current use: Residential: House. Intrinsic architectural merit	Victoria West	Victoria West	Register	31°24′17″S 23°06′49″E	Upload Photo
9/2/100/0003-034	Erf 132, Church Street, Vosburg	Small single storeyed Karoo building of rectangular form with outbuilding and werf walls in front. Type of site: House. Current use: Uninhabited. A fine example of a small Karoo dwelling and outbuilding. It has aesthetic merit.	Vosburg	Victoria West	Pending	30°34′30″S 22°52′49″E	Upload Photo
9/2/100/0005	Dutch Reformed Church, Church Street, Vosburg	This neo-Gothic church building was designed by the architect W. H. Ford and erected by the builders Keating and Co. The foundation stone was laid on 27 November 1909 and the church inaugurated on 17 September 1910. Type of site: Church. Current use: Religious: Church. The church is an outstanding example of its type, of considerable aesthetic merit.	Vosburg	Victoria West	Provincial Heritage Site	30°34′36″S 22°52′46″E	This neo-Gothic church building was designed by the architect W. H. Ford and erected by the builders Keating and Co. The foundation stone was laid on 27 November 1909 and the church inaugurated on 17 September 1910. Type of site: Church. Current use: Religious: Church. The church is an outstanding example of its type, of considerable aesthetic merit.
9/2/100/0007	Dutch Reformed Church, 67 Church Street, Victoria West	Building is a neo-Gothic hall church with moulded plain end-gables and a tower with a high spire (originally a castle-type tower). Planned in 1844 but was only partly completed when inaugurated in 1850. Enlarged in 1922. Type of site: Church. The church in Victoria West is one of the first constructed in the Northern Cape. It is largely unaltered.	Victoria West	Victoria West	Provincial Heritage Site	31°24′14″S 23°06′31″E	Upload Photo
9/2/100/0009	Municipal Cemetery, Richmond Street, Victoria West	Founded in 1847. Surrounded by stone wall plastered on top. Of local cultural and historical value. Founded in 1847. Type of site: Municipal Cemetery. Current use: Religious: Cemetery. Intrinsic architectural merit	Victoria West	Victoria West	Register	31°24′07″S 23°06′58″E	Upload Photo
9/2/100/0010-001	Conservation Area No. 1, Victoria West	Type of site: Conservation area.	Victoria West	Victoria West	Heritage Area	31°24′11″S 23°07′14″E	Upload Photo
9/2/100/0010-002	Conservation Area No. 2, Victoria West	Type of site: Conservation area.	Victoria West	Victoria West	Heritage Area	31°24′11″S 23°07′14″E	Upload Photo
9/2/100/0010-003	Conservation Area No. 3, Victoria West	Type of site: Conservation area. Victoria West is one of the few Karoo towns whose architectural integrity has not been excessively affected by insensitive development. The areas identified are the most fully preserved areas of the town, each with pivotal buildings.	Victoria West	Victoria West	Heritage Area	31°24′11″S 23°07′14″E	Upload Photo
9/2/100/0014-001	Plein Street, Vosburg	Interesting example of a single-storeyed vernacular Karoo building. Square form. Type of site: House. Current use: Residential: House. An excellent example of vernacular Karoo architecture.	Vosburg	Victoria West	Register	30°34′37″S 22°52′46″E	Upload Photo
9/2/100/0014-007	Erf 50, Market Street, Vosburg	Largely intact Victorian dwelling. Single storey with complex roof and two forward-projecting gables. Type of site: House. Current use: Residential: House. It contributes significantly.	Vosburg	Victoria West	Register	30°34′32″S 22°52′54″E	Upload Photo
9/2/100/0014-011	Erf 161, Church Street, Vosburg	Single storeyed rectangular Karoo dwelling with flat corrugated iron roof, stepped parapet. Type of site: House. Current use: Residential: House. A Karoo dwelling with an irregular configuration of openings – largely intact.	Vosburg	Victoria West	Register	30°34′30″S 22°52′49″E	Upload Photo
9/2/100/0014-013	Dutch Reformed Church Parsonage, Church Street, Vosburg	A fine single-storeyed Edwardian residence with wrap-around ogee veranda and hipped corrugated iron. Type of site: Parsonage. Current use: Residential: House. This fine Edwardian building has been restored and is one of the more significant residences.	Vosburg	Victoria West	Register	30°34′30″S 22°52′49″E	Upload Photo
9/2/100/0014-014	Old Parsonage, Market Street, Vosburg	Single-storeyed square form Victorian house with complex corrugated iron roof. Twin front gables. Type of site: Parsonage. Current use: Religious: Parsonage. An excellent example of an early Victorian residence which is intact in architectural detail.	Vosburg	Victoria West	Register	30°34′32″S 22°52′54″E	Upload Photo
9/2/100/0014-019	Hunters Home Hotel, Market Street, Vosburg	Double-storeyed L-shaped building with corrugated iron roof. Plastered brick. Type of site: Hotel. Current use: Commercial: Hotel. Other than the Dutch Reformed Church, this building is pivotal in the town.	Vosburg	Victoria West	Register	30°34′29″S 22°52′54″E	Upload Photo
9/2/100/0014-020	Garage, Market Street, Vosburg	Garage with corrugated iron roof and Cape end gables. Original wooden loft door. Type of site: Commercial. Current use: Commercial: Garage. An intact early outbuilding, probably originally a stable. Interesting Cape end gables.	Vosburg	Victoria West	Register	30°34′32″S 22°52′54″E	Upload Photo
9/2/100/0014-022	Outbuilding, Victoria Street, Vosburg	Flat-roofed Karoo house with stepped parapet. Original windows intact behind metal screens. Type of site: Outbuilding. Current use: Outbuilding. This unusual Karoo building with an asymmetrical arrangement of openings and an intact werf.	Vosburg	Victoria West	Register	30°34′32″S 22°52′41″E	Upload Photo
9/2/100/0014-027	Erf 256, Victoria Street, Vosburg	Single-storeyed Karoo building of square form with flat corrugated iron roof and stepped parapet. Type of site: House. Current use: Residential: House. A fine example of the Karoo style building in Vosburg. Detailing on the front facade is noteworthy.	Vosburg	Victoria West	Register	30°34′31″S 22°52′41″E	Upload Photo
9/2/100/0014-028	Shop, Cilliers Street, Vosburg	Single-storeyed shop with outbuildings all of rectangular form with flat corrugated roofs. Type of site: House. Current use: Uninhabited. The shop and outbuildings are a rare surviving example of their type.	Vosburg	Victoria West	Register	30°34′26″S 22°52′50″E	Upload Photo
9/2/100/0014-029	Erf 20, Market Street, Vosburg	Single-storeyed Karoo complex comprising two dwellings joined by a white-washed plastered werf wall. Type of site: House. Current use: Residential: House. This Karoo complex is of outstanding aesthetic merit and has much architectural significance.	Vosburg	Victoria West	Register	30°34′32″S 22°52′54″E	Upload Photo
9/2/100/0014-030	Van Heerden Street, Vosburg	Single-storeyed Karoo building of square form with flat corrugated iron roof and stepped parapet. Type of site: House. Current use: Residential: House. Virtually unaltered Karoo house with aesthetic appeal in sensitive precinct.	Vosburg	Victoria West	Register	30°34′33″S 22°52′44″E	Upload Photo
9/2/100/0014-032	Erf 139, Church Street, Vosburg	Single-storeyed Victorian building of square form with steeply pitched corrugated iron pyramidal roof. Type of site: House. Current use: Residential: House. With the exception of one insensitive alteration, this building has aesthetic appeal.	Vosburg	Victoria West	Register	30°34′30″S 22°52′49″E	Upload Photo
9/2/100/0014-033	Erf 254, Maeder Street, Vosburg	Single-storeyed vernacular Karoo building of aesthetic merit. Simple stepped parapet. Type of site: House. Current use: Residential: House. An excellent example of Karoo vernacular architecture.	Vosburg	Victoria West	Register	30°35′30″S 22°51′10″E	Upload Photo
9/2/100/0014-035	Erf 165, Van Rensburg Street, Vosburg	Vitorian single-storeyed cottage with loft. Corrugated iron saddle roof. Ogee verandah. Type of site: House. Current use: Residential: House. A well-kept Victorian cottage which has been sensitively modernised.	Vosburg	Victoria West	Register	30°34′29″S 22°52′44″E	Upload Photo
9/2/100/0014-036	Erf 153, Church Street, Vosburg	Single-storeyed Karoo house with vernacular decorative cornice. Square form. Type of site: House. Current use: Residential: House. A fine example of a Karoo vernacular building. Located on a corner. Largely intact.	Vosburg	Victoria West	Register	30°34′31″S 22°52′49″E	Upload Photo
9/2/100/0014-037	Erf 33, Market Street, Vosburg	Small Karoo-style single-storeyed dwelling with elaborate cornice detailing and flat roof. Type of site: House. Current use: Residential: House. An excellent example of a small Karoo dwelling in a largely intact condition.	Vosburg	Victoria West	Register	30°34′32″S 22°52′54″E	Upload Photo
9/2/100/0014-039	Erf 111, Church Street, Vosburg	Single-storeyed Karoo house with flat corrugated iron roof with stepped parapet. Simple pediment. Type of site: House. Current use: Uninhabited. Good example of a Karoo dwelling, unaltered and in an isolated location.	Vosburg	Victoria West	Register	30°34′30″S 22°52′49″E	Upload Photo
9/2/100/0014-040	Erf 151, Human Street, Vosburg	Single-storeyed rectangular house with corrugated iron saddle roof. Fine wooden trellised Victorian. Type of site: House. Current use: Residential: House. The building is largely intact and has a very fine, if ill-kept, street elevation.	Vosburg	Victoria West	Register	30°35′40″S 22°50′47″E	Upload Photo
9/2/100/0017	Apollo Theatre, 88 Church Street, Victoria West	The Appollo theatre on Church st is an art deco style building constructed in 1956, and designed by architect Andrew Bassil, replacing a demolished cafe designed by the same architect in 1928. The building was bricked up in the 1970s and reopened in the 1990s. Photo by Christo Vosloo.	Victoria West	Victoria West	Register	31°24′13″S 23°06′34″E	The Appollo theatre on Church st is an art deco style building constructed in 1956, and designed by architect Andrew Bassil, replacing a demolished cafe designed by the same architect in 1928. The building was bricked up in the 1970s and reopened in the 1990s. Photo by Christo Vosloo.
