= Robert Devenish =

Robert Devenish may refer to:

- Robert Devenish (herald) (c. 1637–1704), English herald: Norroy and Ulster King of Arms, 1700–1704
- Robert Devenish (Dean of Cashel) (died 1916), Irish Anglican priest and father of the below
- Robert Devenish (Archdeacon of Lahore) (1888–1973), Irish Anglican priest in England and the colonies
