= James Syme (priest) =

The Ven James Greensill Skottowe Syme was Archdeacon of Lahore from 1916 to 1919.

Syme was educated at the University of Glasgow and Edinburgh Theological College; and ordained Deacon in 1888 and Priest in 1889. He was Curate at Hamilton, South Lanarkshire and then went out to the North Western Frontier Province. He was at Calcutta, Dum Dum, Quetta, Abbottabad, Multan, Karachi and Shimla before his time as Archdeacon; and at Ampthill and Alstead afterwards.

He died at Farnham on 18 April 1948.

== Notes ==
Church of England titles
Preceded by Edward John Warlow	Archdeacon of Lahore; 1916–1919	Succeeded by Hugh Trevor Wheeler
