= Sieberhagen =

Sieberhagen is a surname. Notable people with the surname include:

- Jacobus Johannes Sieberhagen (born 1961), South African sculptor
- Melt Sieberhagen, South African actor and comic
