= Mary Russell, Duchess of Bedford =

British aviator and ornithologist

Her Grace The Duchess of Bedford DBE ARRC DStJ FLS
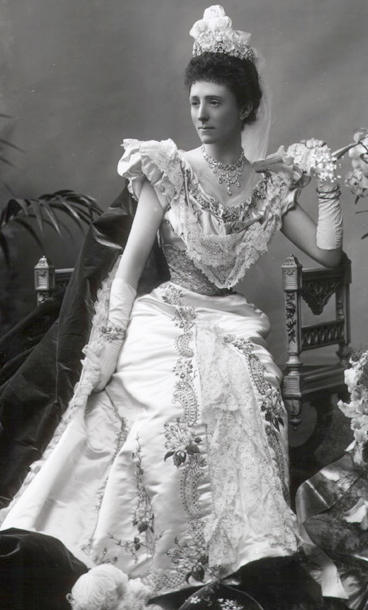
- The Duchess of Bedford in 1898
- Born: Mary Du Caurroy Tribe; 26 September 1865; Stockbridge, Hampshire, England
- Died: 22 March 1937 (aged 71); North Sea, off Great Yarmouth, Norfolk, England
- Occupations: Aviator, ornithologist
- Spouse: Herbrand Russell, 11th Duke of Bedford (m. 1888)
- Children: Hastings Russell, 12th Duke of Bedford
- Parent(s): Walter Harry Tribe and Sophy Lander

Mary Du Caurroy Russell, Duchess of Bedford, DBE, ARRC, DStJ, FLS (née Tribe; 26 September 1865 – ca. 22 March 1937) was a British aviator and ornithologist. She was honoured for her work in founding hospitals and working in them during the First World War. She later financed and took part in record breaking flights to Karachi and Cape Town.

== Early and personal life ==
Born at Stockbridge, Hampshire, she was the daughter of Walter Harry Tribe, Anglican Archdeacon of Lahore, and his wife, Sophy Lander. On 30/31 January 1888, she married Lord Herbrand Russell at Barrackpore, British Raj. When Lord Herbrand inherited his childless brother's titles in 1893, she was styled as the Duchess of Bedford. Her only child, Hastings, was born on 21 December 1888.

During the early 1900s she became one of the first Western women to study the Japanese martial art of jujutsu, and she was featured in a series of instructional photographs for the book "The Fine Art of Jujutsu" (1905), written by Emily Diana Watts.

== Work and activism ==
A major area of organisation and work for the Duchess was in founding four hospitals in Woburn and in the grounds of Woburn Abbey. The principal establishment was the Abbey Hospital that she financed and built in 1914, and where she worked as a nurse and radiographer through to the 1930s.

She chartered the yacht Sapphire (Note: Not to be confused with the later yacht Sapphire, commissioned by her husband as a replacement in 1912.) from a Mr. A. L. Barbour and later bought it from him, using it in ornithological voyages to the North of Scotland and Scandinavia.

The Duchess was a collector and watcher of birds, and took an interest in bird migration. Between 1909 and 1914 she spent much time on Fair Isle, often in the company of William Eagle Clarke. Her journal, A Bird-watcher's Diary, was privately published in 1938 after her death.

She was a member of the Women's Tax Resistance League, a group associated with the Women's Social and Political Union that used tax resistance to protest the disenfranchisement of women during the British women's suffrage movement.

== Aviation ==
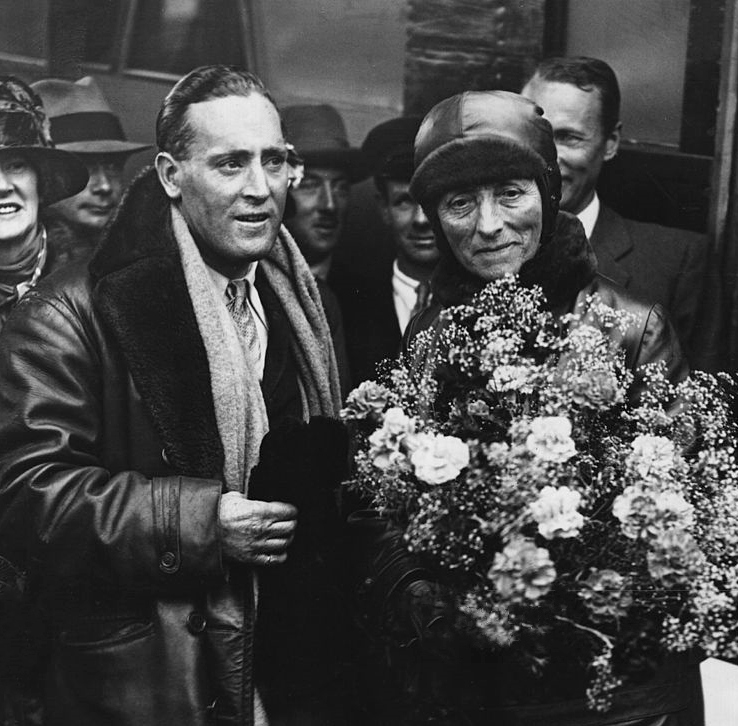
Barnard and the Duchess returning from their India flight on 9 August 1929

Late in life at age 63, the Duchess became interested in aviation, that she claimed gave her some relief from her constant tinnitus, although she eventually became totally deaf. In 1928 a large country house, Wispers, near Midhurst in West Sussex, and its estate were bought by the Bedford Estate for Russell. She used Wispers as a weekend retreat: she was a keen aviator and flew her plane from the family seat at Woburn Abbey to Wispers, where she had a hangar constructed in the 1930s at the same time as the large eastern wing was being added to the house. She used a nearby field as a landing strip.

On 2 August 1929, she departed on a record-breaking flight of 10,000 miles from Lympne Airport to Karachi (then in India) and return to Croydon Airport in eight days. She was accompanied in her single-engined Fokker F.VII (G-EBTS, Princess Xenia, which she renamed "The Spider" for its tenacity) by her personal pilot Captain C. D. Barnard and mechanic Robert (Bob) Little. On 8 April 1930 she made her first solo flight, in her DH.60G Moth (G-AAAO). On 10 April 1930 she embarked on a record-breaking flight from Lympne Airport to Cape Town, in "The Spider", flying 9,000 miles in 91 hours and twenty minutes over 10 days, again with Barnard and Little.

In 1934 and again in 1935, with co-pilot F/Lt R. C. Preston in de Havilland Puss Moth G-ABOC, the Duchess made extensive flights from Britain to the Western Sahara and Northern Nigeria.

== Honours ==
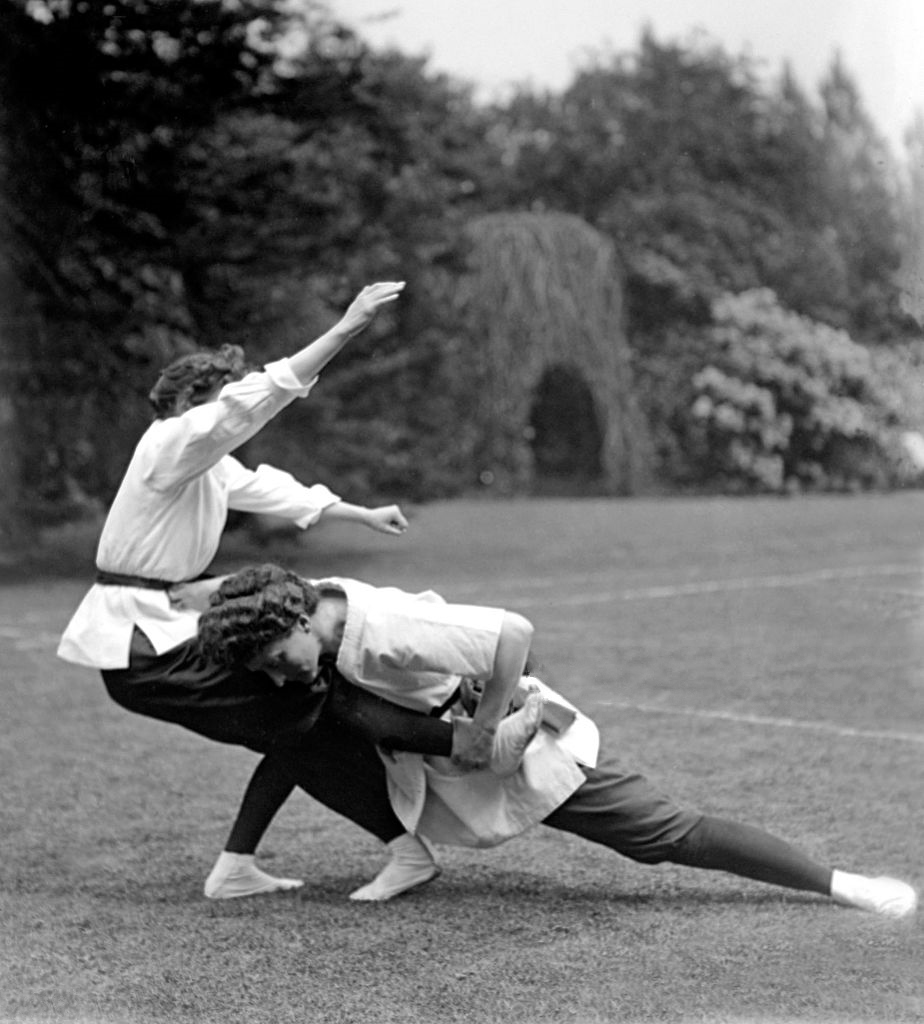
The Duchess (right) practising jujutsu with Emily Diana Watts c. 1905

In January 1918, the duchess was awarded the Royal Red Cross in the second Associate grade, for her services to wartime nursing at Woburn Auxiliary Hospital. She was appointed a Dame Commander of the Order of the British Empire in 1928. She was also Dame of Grace of the Order of Saint John (DGStJ) and a Fellow of the Linnean Society of the Imperial College (FLS).

== Eponym ==
The Lesser Striped Shrew Sorex bedfordiae is named after her. It is found in Asia, from central China to Nepal, Assam and Myanmar. A moose from Siberia, Alces bedfordiae, was named after her in 1902, but the species is not currently considered valid.

== Death ==
The duchess died aged 71, in March 1937, three months before Amelia Earhart's death, after leaving Woburn Abbey in a DH.60GIII Moth Major (G-ACUR), that crashed into the North Sea off Great Yarmouth; her body was never recovered.

== See also ==
- List of people who disappeared at sea
- List of suffragists and suffragettes
