= Mervyn Evers =

The Ven Mervyn Saxelbye Evers, MC was archdeacon of Lahore from 1940 to 1944.

He was educated at Clare College, Cambridge and ordained in 1914. His first post was as a curate at St Matthew, Hull after which he was a chaplain to the British Armed Forces from 1914 to 1919. He was curate of All Saints, Northampton from 1919 to 1920 and Boys’ School secretary for the Church Mission Society from 1920 to 1923 then curate of St Matthew, West Ham from 1923 to 1924. He served the church in the North Western Frontier Province from 1924 to 1944: he was at Peshawar, Rawalpindi, Quetta, Waziristan, Ambala and Shimla before his years as Archdeacon; and at Boroughbridge, Guestling and Rye afterwards.

== Notes ==
Church of England titles
Preceded by Robert Cecil Sylvester Devenish	Archdeacon of Lahore; 1940–1944	Succeeded by George Laurence
