= Walter Tribe =

Walter Harry Tribe (Fittleworth, Sussex, 4 September 1832 – 1909) was Archdeacon of Lahore from 1885 to 1892.

== Biography ==
Son of John Tribe and wife Harriet Hews, Tribe was educated at Wadham College, Oxford, Oxfordshire, and ordained in 1857. After a curacy at Broughton, Hampshire, he was Rector of Stockbridge, Hampshire, from 1860 to 1867. Following this he served in the North West Frontier. He was at, successively, Bareilly, Agra, Delhi, Allahabad, Sealkote, Rawalpindi and Simla before his time as Archdeacon of Lahore between 1885 and 1892, all in the British Raj. Afterwards he was the Chaplain at Algiers from 1894 to 1895 when he became Vicar of Awliscombe.

In Portsea in July / September 1861 he married Sophy Lauder and they had five children: Zoe (1862–1960) John Campbell (1870–1945), his twin William Foulkes (1870–1892), Charles Walter (1868–1915) and Mary Russell, Duchess of Bedford (1865–1937), a notable aviator and ornithologist.

== Notes ==
Church of England titles
Preceded by Inaugural appointment	Archdeacon of Lahore; 1885–1892	Succeeded by Andrew Spens
