= Tiger Devenish =

South African rugby union player

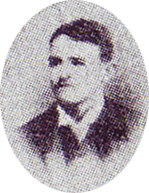
- Born: Mynardus Jeremias Devenish; 27 May 1867 Victoria West, Cape Colony
- Died: 10 September 1928 (aged 61) Croydon, England
- School: SACS
- Notable relative: Charlie Devenish (brother)

Rugby union career
- Position: Forward
Provincial / State sides
Years	Team	Apps	(Points)
- Transvaal
- Correct as of 19 July 2010
International career
Years	Team	Apps	(Points)
1891	South Africa	1	(0)
- Correct as of 19 July 2010

Mynardus Jeremias "Tiger" Devenish (27 May 1867 – 10 September 1928) was a South African international rugby union player.

== Biography ==
Born in Victoria West, he attended SACS before playing provincial rugby for Transvaal (now known as the Golden Lions). In July 1891 he was selected to represent South Africa, as a forward, in their first ever Test—against Great Britain at the Crusader's Ground, Port Elizabeth. The match, which was won by Great Britain, was his only appearance for South Africa. Devenish died in 1928 at the age of 61.

=== Test history ===
No.	Opponents	Results(SA 1st)	Position	Tries	Date	Venue
1.	(United Kingdom) British Isles	0–4	Forward		30 Jul 1891	Crusaders Ground, Port Elizabeth

== See also ==
- List of South Africa national rugby union players – Springbok no. 10
