= Roy Beynon =

English Anglican priest

- Born: James Royston Beynon; 16 September 1907
- Died: 2 December 1991 (aged 84)
- Citizenship: English
- Education: St Augustine's College, Canterbury
- Occupation: priest
- Spouse: Mildred née Fromings (m. 1933)
- Children: 4 daughters
- Religion: Anglican
- Ordained: 1933; 93 years ago
- Congregations served: North West Frontier
- Offices held: Archdeacon of Lahore; Vicar of Twyford; Rural Dean of Winchester; Archdeacon of Winchester

The Ven James Royston (Roy) Beynon (16 September 1907 – 2 December 1991) was an English Anglican priest.

He was educated at St Augustine's College, Canterbury and ordained in 1933. His early posts were in the North West Frontier: he served in Peshawar, Quetta and as Archdeacon of Lahore from 1947 to 1948. He was Vicar of Twyford from 1948 to 1973; Rural Dean of Winchester from 1958 to 1962; and Archdeacon of Winchester from 1962 to 1973.

He married Mildred née Fromings in 1933 : they had four daughters. They retired to London, Ontario. She pre-deceased him in 1986.

== Notes ==
Church of England titles
Preceded by George Laurence	Archdeacon of Lahore; 1947–1948	Succeeded by Laurence Henry Woolmer
Preceded by Leslie Hamilton Lang	Archdeacon of Winchester; 1962–1973	Succeeded by Edward David Cartwright
