= Devonish =

Devonish is a surname. Notable people with the surname include:

- Asnoldo Devonish (1932–1997), Venezuelan long jumper and triple jumper
- Marlon Devonish (born 1976), English sprinter
- Nicole Devonish (born 1973), Canadian long jumper

== See also ==
- Devenish (disambiguation)
