= Edmund Warlow =

The Ven Edmund John Warlow was Archdeacon of Lahore from 1912 to 1916.

== Career ==
Warlow was educated at Corpus Christi College, Cambridge and ordained Deacon in 1886 and Priest in 1887. He was Curate at Stratton St Margaret and then St Saviour, Paddington. He went out to the North Western Frontier Province in 1889. He was at Dagshai, Ambala, Jullundur, Quetta, Murree, Umballa and Shimla before his time as Archdeacon; and at Brampford Speke and Venice afterwards.

== Notes ==
Church of England titles
Preceded by Gerald Nicolls	Archdeacon of Lahore; 1912–1916	Succeeded by Hugh Trevor Wheeler
