= Andrew Spens =

Archdeacon of Lahore

The Ven Andrew N. W. Spens of Craigsanquhar
- Born: 25 April 1844
- Died: 13 April 1932 (aged 87)
- Education: Loretto School
- Alma mater: Durham University
- Occupation: Archdeacon of Lahore
- Spouses: Sarah Middleton (m. 1870–1874) Emma Burgoyne Condon (m. 1882–1892) Martha Ella James (m. 1902–1932)
- Children: Andrew William Spens
- Parents: Andrew Spens (father); Diana Diggle (mother)

The Ven Andrew Nathaniel Wadham Spens of Craigsanquhar (25 April 1844 – 13 April 1932) was a Church of England priest. He served as Archdeacon of Lahore from 1892 to 1900.

== Early life ==
Spens was the son of Major-General Andrew Spens (1801–1859).His early education was at Loretto in Edinburgh. This was followed by Durham University, where he studied for his licentiate in Theology as a member of Hatfield Hall, earning a Barry Scholarship. Following University, Spens joined the East India Company Navy as a Midshipman under Richard Green.

== Career ==
He was ordained in 1868. He held Curacies in Trowbridge, Tamworth, and Millbrook. He was Colonial Chaplain to British Guiana in 1870 before further curacies at St Paul's, Covent Garden and Mildenhall. In 1874 he went to India as a chaplain, firstly to Bengal. In 1875, he was the chaplain of Calcutta Cathedral. His service on the North West Frontier included stints at Sialkot, Karachi, Amritsar, Ferozepore, Multan and Simla before his years as archdeacon.

== Family ==
Spens was married twice, with his first wife, Sarah Middleton (m. 25 April 1871 in St. George's Cathedral, Georgetown), he had one son, Andrew William Spens (1872–1917), a Trinity College, Cambridge graduate who died of wounds sustained during the Great War. His second wife was Emma Burgoyne Condon, daughter of James Condon (m. 14 May 1880 in Karachi). His third wife was Martha Ella James, daughter of Philip James, who he (m. 14 May 1902 in Kensington). Through his third wife, Martha, Spens became the brother-in-law of Rev. Canon Mark James.

He was recognised by the Lord Lyon King of Arms and, as Spens of Craigsanquhar, matriculated his arms at the Court of the Lord Lyon in 1897.

Church of England titles
Preceded by Walter Harry Tribe	Archdeacon of Lahore; 1892–1900	Succeeded by Henry Wager Griffith
