= Robert Bolton (clergyman, born 1572) =

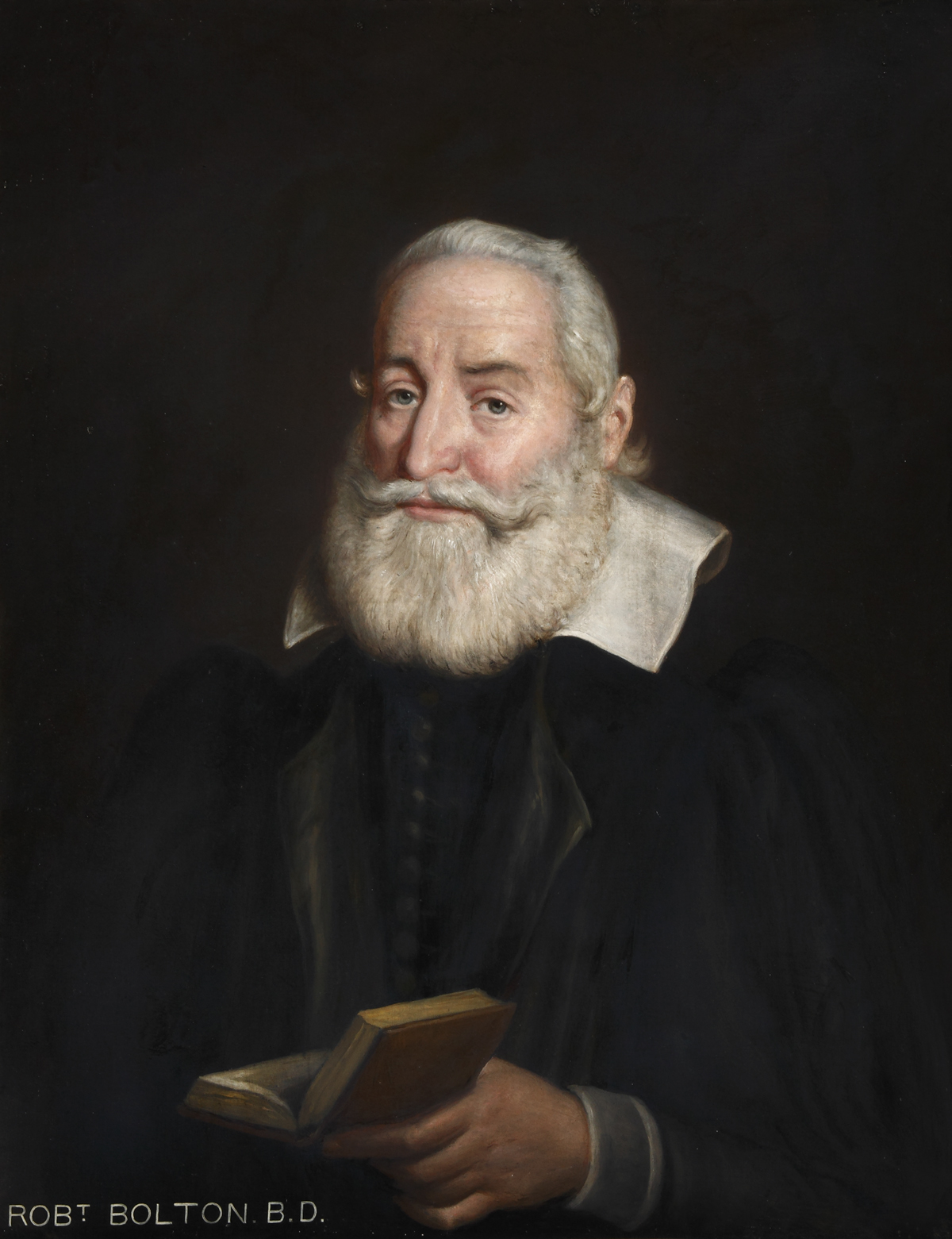

Robert Bolton (1572 – 16 December 1631) was an English clergyman and academic, noted as a preacher.

== Life ==
He was born on Whit Sunday in Blackburn, Lancashire, the sixth son of Adam Bolton of Backhouse. He attended what is now Queen Elizabeth's Grammar School, Blackburn, where his father was a founding governor, and was described as 'the best scholler in the schoole'. At age 18, he was admitted in 1592 to Lincoln College, Oxford, where John Randall was. He was a gifted student, but the next year his father's death caused him financial problems. Richard Brett supported him. He transferred to Brasenose College where there was a Lancashire fellowship available, and proceeded B.A. there on 2 December 1596; and was chosen in 1602 as a fellow of the college, taking his M.A. on 30 July. He was not particularly religious at this period, and was unimpressed with the preaching of William Perkins; Bolton said he thought Perkins was "a barren empty fellow".

On James I's visit to the university in 1605, he was appointed to hold a disputation in the royal presence on natural philosophy, and his majesty was loud and frank in laudation of Bolton. He was also appointed lecturer in logic and moral and natural philosophy. A school friend named Anderton made a plan with Bolton to travel to a Catholic seminary in Flanders, but this fell through. Under the influence of Thomas Peacock of Brasenose he then proceeded B.D. in 1609, having decided to become a clergyman in the church of England. In 1610, now aged 37, he was presented by Sir Augustine Nicolls, a judge and occasional preacher, to the rectory of Broughton, Northamptonshire. Bolton died, after a lingering sickness of a quartan ague, on Saturday, 17 December 1631, being then in his sixtieth year. He was buried 19 December in the chancel of his own church St. Andrew's, Broughton, where there is a monument. His funeral sermon was preached by Nicholas Estwick, B.D., and was published. Edward Bagshawe wrote his life.

== Writings ==
Anthony Wood commented that he could write and dispute in Greek as in English or Latin. Some describe him as the greatest classical scholar of his time. James Darling, founder of the Metropolitan Library in London, England in 1840, wrote:

He was one of the best scholars of his time, a zealous and successful preacher, and particularly skilled in resolving the doubts of timid Christians. His style is florid and often truly magnificent."

In his well-known book, General directions for a Comfortable Walking with God, Bolton discusses subjects like Idleness, Government of the Tongue, Recreations, Visitations, Sleep, and Marriage.

In The Saints Sure and Perpetual Guide, Bolton argued against separation.

== Selected publications ==
- The Saints Sure and Perpetual Guide, Robert Bolton, 1634
- The Carnal Professor: Discovering the Woeful Slavery of a Man Guided By the Flesh – Sermons & Christ Set Forth, Robert Bolton and Thomas Goodwin, originally published 1634, reprinted by Soli Deo Gloria Pubns Morgan, PA, (1997) ISBN 1-877611-47-6
- The carnall professor. Discovering the wofull slavery of a man guided by the flesh. Distinguishing a true spirituall Christian that walkes close with God, from all formalists in religion, rotten hearted hypocrites, and empty powerlesse professors whatsoever. By that faithfull servant of Christ, Robert Bolton B.D. late preacher in Northampton Shire., Robert Bolton, London : Printed [by Miles Flesher] for R. Dawlman, at the Brazen Serpent in Pauls Church-yard, 1634.
- General Directions for a Comfortable Walking with God, Robert Bolton, Soli Deo Gloria Publications, Morgan, PA, 1991 (1995 printing) ISBN 1-877611-26-3
- A Discourse About the State of True Happinesse. Delivered in Certaine Sermons in Oxford, and at Pauls Crosse., Robert Bolton, Batchelour in Divinitie, and Minister of Gods Word at Broughton in Northampton Shire. The sixth Edition, corrected and amended, with a Table thereunto annexed. At London, Imprinted by Iohn Legatt, for Edmund Weaver, and are to be sold at his Shop at the great North doore of Pauls Church. 1636.
- The Saints Self-Enriching Examination, Robert Bolton
- The Foure Last Things: Death, Judgment, Hell, Heaven, Robert Bolton, 1633, Soli Deo Gloria Pubns Morgan, PA, (1997) ISBN 1-877611-89-1
- A Treatise on Comforting Afflicted Consciences, Robert Bolton, Soli Deo Gloria Ministries, Morgan, PA (1991) ISBN 1-877611-25-5
- A cordial for Christians in the time of affliction, Robert Bolton, London, 1640
- Heart Surgery, Robert Bolton, Zoar Publications, ISBN 0-904435-02-4

== Family ==
He married Anne Boyse, and they had five children, a son Samuel Bolton and four daughters.
