= Robert Devenish (Dean of Cashel) =

Irish Anglican priest

Robert Jones Sylvester Devenish (6 December 1850 – 16 September 1916) was an Irish Anglican priest in the late 19th and early 20th centuries.

He was educated at Trinity College, Dublin and ordained in 1874. After a curacy at St Patrick, Waterford he was Vicar of Cahir from 1874 to 1881. He married Rosamond Price on 5 February 1877: they had a daughter and three sons, one of whom was Robert Cecil Sylvester Devenish, Archdeacon of Lahore. He was Prebendary of Rossduff in Waterford Cathedral from 1883 to 1886; Archdeacon of Waterford from 1886 to 1913; and Dean of Cashel from 1913 until his death.
