= Victoria West =

Victoria West Victoria-Wes
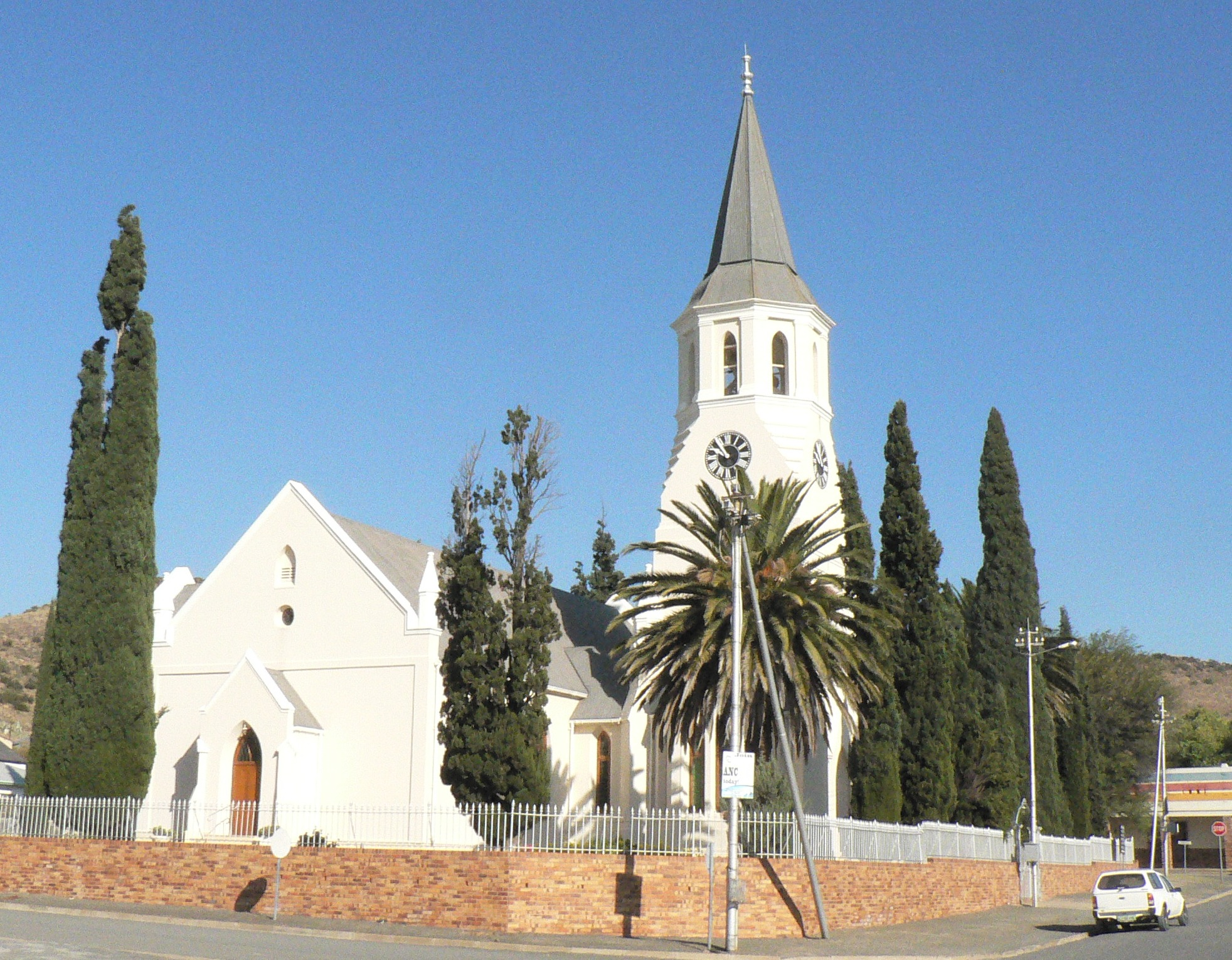
- Dutch Reformed Church, Victoria West

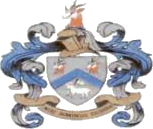
- Seal

- Location within Northern Cape Location within South Africa
- Coordinates: 31°24′11″S 23°07′14″E
- Country: South Africa
- Province: Northern Cape
- District: Pixley ka Seme
- Municipality: Ubuntu
- Established: 1844

Area
  - Total: 78.95 km^{2} (30.48 sq mi)

Population (2011)
  - Total: 8,254
  - Density: 104.5/km^{2} (270.8/sq mi)

Racial makeup (2011)
  - Black African: 23.7%
  - Coloured: 69.3%
  - Indian/Asian: 0.4%
  - White: 5.6%
  - Other: 0.9%

First languages (2011)
  - Afrikaans: 82.1%
  - Xhosa: 13.8%
  - English: 1.1%
  - Other: 3.0%
- Time zone: UTC+2 (SAST)
- Postal code (street): 7070
- PO box: 7070
- Area code: 053

Victoria West is a town in the central Karoo region of South Africa's Northern Cape province. It is situated on the N12 road, at an elevation of 1,300 metres (4,300 ft). It is the seat of the Ubuntu Local Municipality within the Pixley ka Seme District Municipality.

== History ==
The town was laid out on the bank of the Brakrivier watercourse in 1843, when the Dutch Reformed Church bought the farm Zeekoegat from the estate of J.H. Classens. It was named Victoria in 1844, after Queen Victoria, though amended to Victoria West in 1855 to distinguish it from an Eastern Cape district. In 1859 the town acquired municipal status.

=== Dutch Reformed Church ===
The first services of the Dutch Reformed Church were led by Rev. Colin Fraser of Beaufort West in the “Kerkhuis” on the farm Kapoksfontein. The congregation in Victoria West separated from that in Beaufort West during October 1843 when the first local preacher, Rev. W.E. Krige was ordained. For various practical reasons, they decided not to establish the town on the farm Kapoksfontein but rather Zeekoegat. Church services were temporarily held in a house on Zeekoegat. There was a need for a comfortable church building and fund raising was started.

- 10 March 1850 - Consecration of the unfinished church took place.
- 8 October 1922 - The restored and improved building was reconstructed.
- 29–30 April 1967 - The restored building was consecrated.

The history of the Dutch Reformed Church is set out in a display at the Victoria West Regional Museum, consisting of documents, photographs, maps, Bibles, items of the first Communion Service and the church's first organ. The church was declared a National Monument in 1992.

=== Wool auctions ===
With the pastoral industry growing, the setting up of a wool market was proposed. The Victoria West Wool Auctions began in 1884 and were well enough supported to justify their being held twice a month. As the market slumped, the activities came to an end. In 1892 an unsuccessful effort was made to revive them.

=== Floods ===
A severe flood struck the town during the night of 27 February 1871 after a cloudburst in the mountains 15 km to the south-west. A wave 4 metres high swept down the dry bed of the Zeekoegat River that runs through the village, overflowed its banks and flooded the houses, causing many to collapse. Many people were swept down the river in total darkness, others saving themselves by climbing into trees and other stationary objects. More than sixty bodies were later recovered and a number buried in the same grave. The number of deaths was never established with certainty.

Another storm occurred at the beginning of December 1897, with the Cape Argus reporting that the downpour had been so heavy that "no rain equal to it had been witnessed since the great flood of 1871. Many dams in the district were washed away".

In 1909 the river broke loose again, flooding the town, with extensive damage to property.

=== Municipal Dam ===
In April 1921, the Municipal Dam, which was approved at a public meeting in 1913 but delayed through cement shortages, was at last completed. A picnic for the benefit for all the children was followed in the evening by a dance. Boats were introduced for the convenience of the public, and a great debate arose as to the bathing facilities. “Proper shelter and protection must be sought and provided by the bathers while dressing and undressing. Bathers must be dressed in a costume sufficient to cover the body decently from shoulder to halfway between the hip and knee”. The Municipal Dam is still in use, but the rules regarding swimwear are more relaxed.

== Transport ==
=== Railway ===
The Cape Government Railways oversaw a massive expansion in the Cape Colony's railway system in the 1870s, though the route to Victoria West was only completed in 1881. The railway connection spurred economic development and the town's demographic growth over the following decades.

The railway line from Cape Town was under construction to Kimberley and as it had already reached Beaufort West, fervent hopes were expressed that Victoria West would be the next major halt. The line was carried about 130 kilometres (80 mi) away, so as to traverse farms belonging to several members of the government. As a result, the line reached the newly built station at Victoria West Road in 1883. It was not until 1904 that the railway line reached Victoria West.

=== Motor cars ===
In the early twentieth century the increased use of motor cars meant the Karoo was no longer isolated. A census in 1924 showed Victoria West had up to 320 motor cars, including 2 busses and 30 motorbikes.

=== Air travel ===
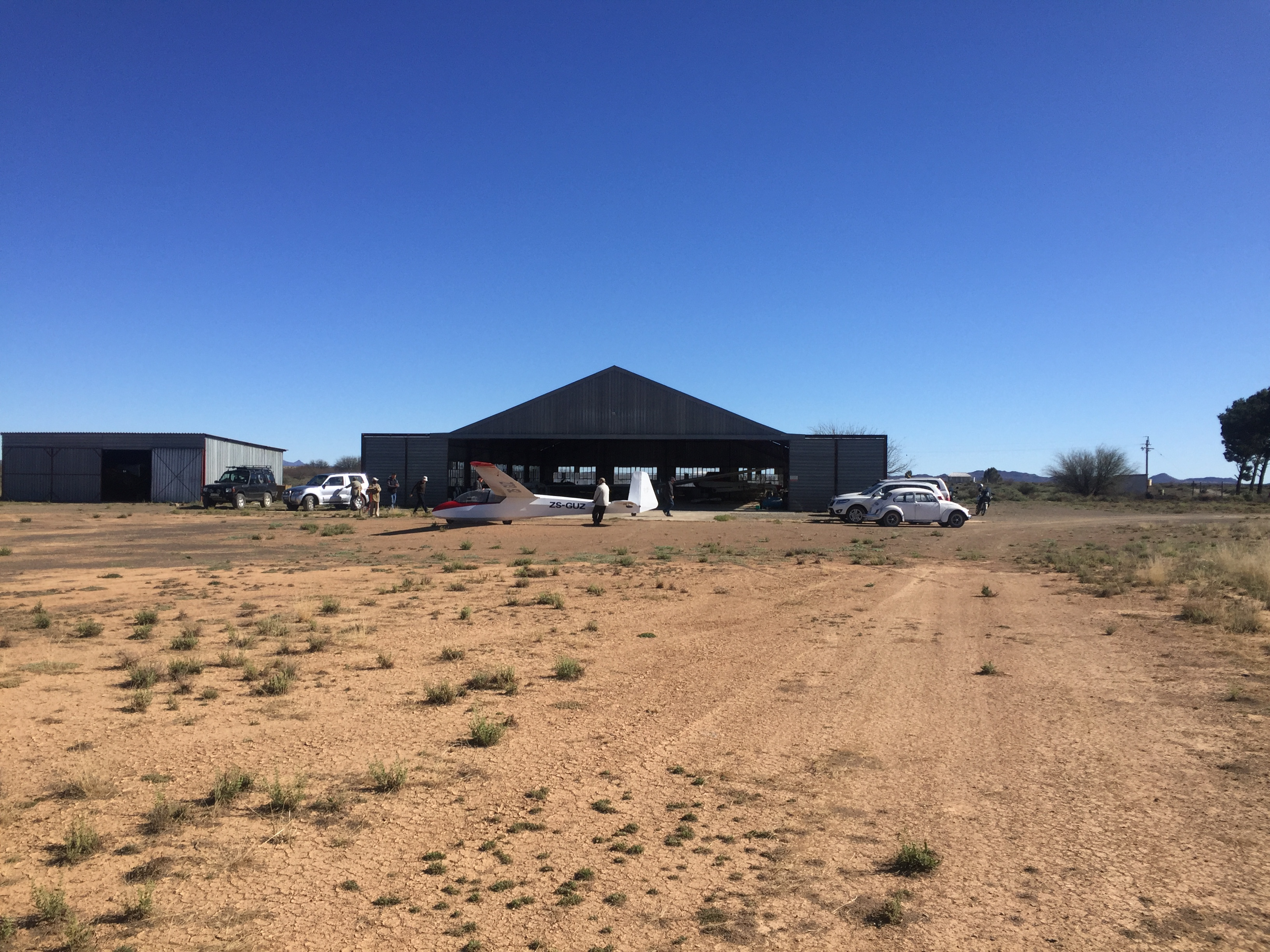
Victoria West Airport in 2016

The town has a small airport (ICAO: FAVW), used only by light aircraft. Until the 1970s when they stopped operating piston engined airliners such as the Douglas DC-3, it was a refueling stop for South African Airways between Cape Town and destinations to the north. By 1931, the Victoria West Airport was already established and was used by Imperial Airways as a stopover to Cape Town. This led to the first of three of the modern air control towers built here; the other two were built in George and Cape Town. Shortly afterwards, a waiting room was built for passengers, and a new building was built in 1953. Large planes no longer land here, but small and private planes are still used. In February 1985, the agreement of 66 years between the municipality and the Shell Oil Company to supply avgas came to an end.

== Architecture ==
The town has prominent examples of South African art deco architecture and Karoostyle architecture.

Karoostyle architecture on Church Street

The Art deco style Radio House

== Library ==
During the 1860s a number of local institutions came into existence, among them the Victoria West Public Library. In 1874 a catalogue of books contained in the library was printed by the well-known firm of Saul Solomon & Co of Cape Town. The building for the Victoria West Public Library was sold on 10 January 1929 to the Victoria West Hebrew Congregation, who used it as a synagogue. Andries P. Olivier from Ysterkoppe died in 1955 and left R8 000 in his will for the establishment of a new library. The new library was built in Church Street and is contiguous with the museum. The new building was opened on 26 October 1959. Presently there are two libraries still in use in the town.

== Banking ==
The Standard Bank of British South Africa opened one of its first branches in Victoria West, after its foundation in 1862. It is now one of the oldest branches of Standard Bank in South Africa, having been established in 1865. It had a considerable turnover, which, indicated by a balance sheet for the local office from 1865, showed assets of over £30 000. The signatures of the shareholders of 1856 may be seen on a parchment roll several meters in length.

== Schools ==
The Victoria West Public School was established by 1891 and can still be seen at the south end of Victoria Street. Between 1890 and 1900, a special branch was opened for the “poor students” of Victoria West. Students at this school paid three pennies per week for schooling.

On 15 April 1910, the cornerstone for a new school building was laid, and the school was formed through the Education Department of the Cape Colonies. It was done by John X. Merriman. In 1952, the school received high school status. The original school burned down on 9 June 1967, but on 14 June 1969, the new building opened. Since then multiple new schools have been built.

== Victoria West Regional Museum ==
The Victoria West Regional Museum was established in 1969. It is a component of Museums Northern Cape.

A marine fossil was discovered in 1960. The Atherstonia seeleyi is the most complete of its kind in the world and was found on the Blourug farm in the district. The specimens can be found in the Karoo area of the museum.

== Communication ==
=== Victoria West Messenger ===
The Victoria West Messenger, one of the oldest weekly newspapers in the country, celebrated its centenary in 1975. It was established on 11 July 1875 by Christiaan W. Zinn. His son, Christiaan Zinn, took over the running of the paper in 1890 and managed it successfully until 1902. D M Olleman joined the publishing company as manager shortly after his arrival from the Netherlands in 1901. He later became the managing director of the Karoo Drukpers Maatskappy. He moved to Bloemfontein in 1908 where he took over the management of the Friend, and started Farmers Weekly, Motor Weekly, Outspan and Personality, and became the driving force behind the Argus Printing and Publishing Company.

=== Telephone ===
The first telephone line in Victoria West was set up in 1912.

== Notable people ==
- Deon Davids
- Charlie Devenish
- Tiger Devenish
- Sandile Dikeni
- Petrus Hugo
- Mannetjies Roux
- Jacobus Johannes Sieberhagen

== See also ==
- List of heritage sites in Victoria West
