= Henry Carden =

The Ven Henry Craven Carden (23 December 1882 – 30 October 1964) was Archdeacon of Lahore from 1929 to 1934.

Born into an aristocratic family, he was educated at Hatfield College, Durham and ordained in 1907. He was Curate at St Peter with St Owen, Hereford then St Mary, Ross-on-Wye. He was Chaplain at Lahore Cathedral until war broke out when he became a Chaplain with the Mesopotamian Expeditionary Force. When peace returned he served the church in the North Western Frontier Province at Peshawar, Abbottabad and Hazara before his appointment as Archdeacon; and at Kilmeston in Hampshire afterwards.

== Notes ==
Church of England titles
Preceded by Hugh Trevor Wheeler	Archdeacon of Lahore; 1929–1934	Succeeded by Robert Cecil Sylvester Devenish
