= George Laurence (priest) =

British Anglican cleric

The Ven George Laurence was Archdeacon of Lahore from 1944 to 1947.

He was educated at St Chad's College and ordained in 1917. His first post was as a missionary in Kanghwa. After this he was Priest in charge at Seoul. He returned to England in 1921 and held curacies in Cradley and West Ham. He served the church in the North Western Frontier Province from 1925 to 1947: he was at Nowshera, Sialkot, Dalhousie, Razmak, New Delhi, Rawalpindi, Risalpur, Peshawar and Quetta before his years as Archdeacon; and at Nailstone and Barton-in-the-Beans afterwards.

== Notes ==
Church of England titles
Preceded by Mervyn Evers	Archdeacon of Lahore; 1940–1944	Succeeded by Roy Beynon
