= Charles Gillmore =

The Ven Charles Albert Gillmore (1854 – 2 November 1939) was Archdeacon of Lahore from 1906 to 1908.

He was educated at the London College of Divinity and ordained in 1881. After a curacy at Holy Trinity, Aldershot he was the Chaplain at Smithills Chapel, Bolton le Moors. Following this he served in the North West Frontier. He served in Amritsar, Peshawar, Murree, Karachi and Sind before his time as officiating Archdeacon. Afterwards he was the Chaplain at Saint-Jean-de-Luz from 1909 to 1915 when he became a Chaplain to the Forces. When peace returned he was Chaplain at Viareggio, Gibraltar and Algeciras before retiring to Westminster in 1927.

He died at Southborough, Kent on 2 November 1939.

== Notes ==
Church of England titles
Preceded by Henry Wager Griffith	Archdeacon of Lahore; 1906–1908	Succeeded by Gerald Edward Nicolls
