= Henry Griffith (priest) =

British priest (1850–1932)

Henry Wager Griffith
- Born: 23 July 1850
- Died: 3 May 1932 (aged 81)
- Education: The Queen's College, Oxford
- Ordained: 1877

The Ven Henry Wager Griffith (23 July 1850 – 3 May 1932) was Archdeacon of Lahore from 1900 to 1905.

== Biography ==
Born 23 July 1850, he was educated at The Queen's College, Oxford, and ordained in 1877. He held Curacies in Ramsgate, and Kennington. In 1881, he went to India as a Chaplain, serving at Umballa, Delhi, Karachi, Rawalpindi, Peshawar, Murree and Amritsar before his years as Archdeacon. On his return from Lahore, he was appointed Vicar of All Saints, Thorp Arch, West Yorkshire. He died on 3 May 1932, aged 81.

== Notes ==
Church of England titles
| Preceded by Andrew Spens | Archdeacon of Lahore; 1900–1905 | Succeeded by Charles Gillmore |
