= Hugh Wheeler (priest) =

The Ven Hugh Trevor Wheeler was Archdeacon of Lahore from 1919 to 1929

Wheeler was born in Belfast, in 1874, to Walter James Wheeler & Elizabeth (nee) Coburn. He was educated at Trinity College, Dublin and ordained Deacon in 1897 and Priest in 1898. He was Curate at Tullylish and then went out to the North Western Frontier Province. He was at Sialkot, Multan, Murree, Rawalpindi, Ambala, Shimla and Karachi before his time as Archdeacon and at Broughton Astley afterwards.

Wheeler married Kathleen Russell Gunning, daughter of Daniel Russell Gunning, on 4 January, 1905 in Dehli, Bengal, India and had one son, George Trevor Wheeler, born 4 April, 1906, Bengal, India who was killed in Eritrea in 1941 leaving a wife and young son.

Hugh Wheeler, known to the family as "Trevor" died in Midhurst, Sussex, on 11 February 1949.

== Notes ==
Church of England titles
Preceded by James Greensill Skottowe Syme	Archdeacon of Lahore; 1919–1929	Succeeded by Henry Craven Carden
