= Jacobus Sieberhagen =

South African sculptor (born 1961)

Jaco Sieberhagen
- Born: 25 January 1961 (age 65); Victoria West, South Africa
- Known for: Sculpture
- Website: jacosieberhagen.com

Jaco Johannes Sieberhagen (born 25 January 1961) is a South African sculptor. He usually creates sculptures of people and animals using wood, metal, and glass. His metal figures are almost always depicted in a silhouette style, using laser-cutting techniques. The wood in his sculptures is usually found and collected driftwood. He describes the scenes he creates as "landscapes of the mind".

== Education ==
Sieberhagen received his BA from the University of Port Elizabeth in 1981, a BTh from Stellenbosch University in 1984, his Licentiate in Theology from Stellenbosch University in 1985 and a Diploma in Fundraising Management from UNISA in 1994. He also studied sculpture at Rhodes University from 1987 to 1990.
