= Dutch Reformed Church, Victoria West =

Church in Victoria West, South Africa

Dutch Reformed Church
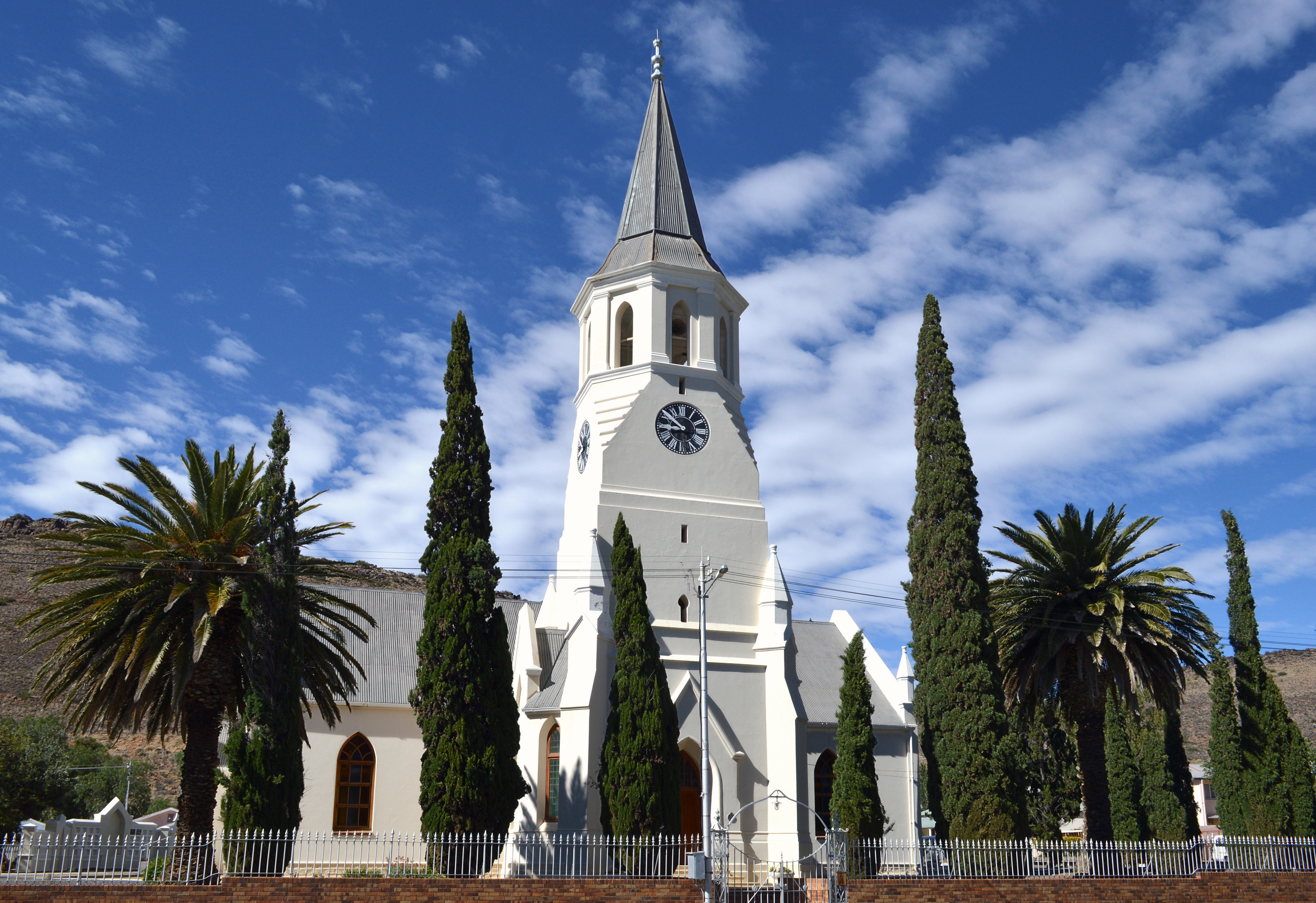
- Location: Victoria West
- Country: South Africa
- Denomination: Nederduits Gereformeerde Kerk

History
- Founded: 1843

Architecture
- Functional status: Church

The Dutch Reformed Church in Victoria West is a congregation of the Dutch Reformed Church in the Northern Cape province. It is the 31st oldest congregation in the Church.

== Foundation ==
In 1843 the extensive wards of Nieuwveld and Uitvlucht belonged to the large congregation of Beaufort West. The zealous Rev. Colin Fraser visited the farm Kapoksfontein from time to time and held outdoor church there. Following a memorandum submitted to the church council to declare Zeekoegat a separate congregation, the Presbytery Commission of Graaff-Reinet purchased this farm on 17 August 1844 for 23 000 rixdaalders and converted the house into an emergency church. On 24 August 1844 the parish was named Victoria in honour of the then young British queen. Erven were sold to the town and 9 000 morgen of land was transferred in 1845 in the name of the church council.

== Ministers ==
- W.A. Krige, 1844–1859
- Hendrik Carel Vos Leibbrandt, 1860–1877 (resigned as minister)
- Jacobus Johannes Petrus Jordaan, 1878 – 2 July 1883 (died in office)
- Gustave Adolph Maeder, 1884–1907 (accepted his emeritus position)
- Jan Gabriel Perold, 1908–1913
- Marthinus Smuts Daneel, 1914–1934
- Dr. Daniël Johannes Louw, 1934–1938
- Jan Thomas Martens, 1938–1943
- Louwrens Hubert Badenhorst, 1961–1964
- Gert Johannes van der Merwe, 1959–1961
- Dirk Johannes de Vries, 1970–2001
