= Faxton =

Abandoned village in Northamptonshire, England

Coordinates: 52°22′09″N 0°51′00″W

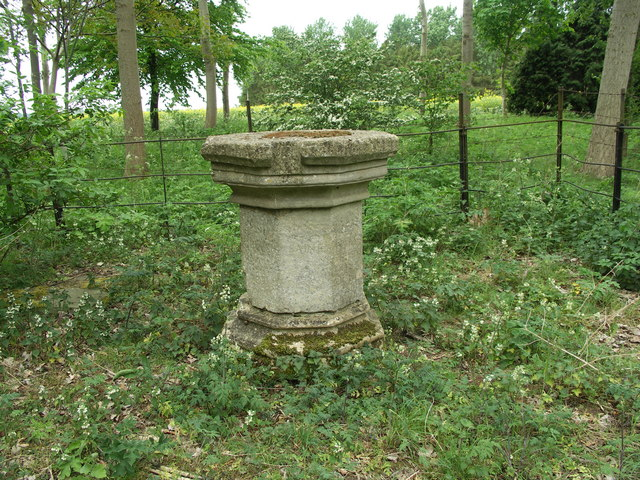
- Remnant of the Church of St Denis, Faxton

- Location within Northamptonshire
- Civil parish: Lamport
- Unitary authority: West Northamptonshire
- Ceremonial county: Northamptonshire
- Region: East Midlands
- Country: England
- Sovereign state: United Kingdom
- Police: Northamptonshire
- Fire: Northamptonshire
- Ambulance: East Midlands

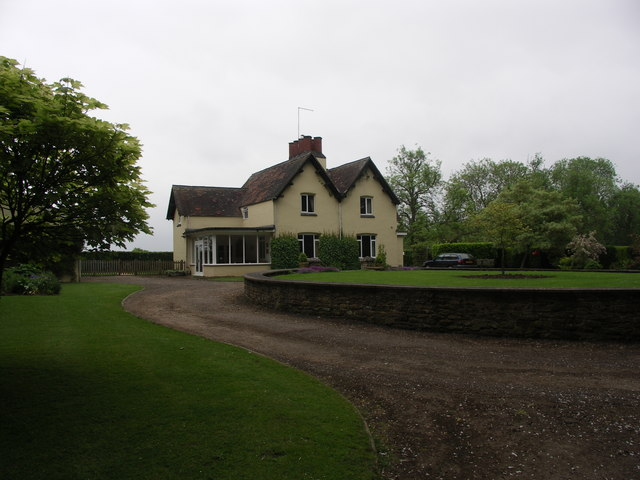
The last inhabited house on the remote hilltop

Faxton is an abandoned village in the civil parish of Lamport, in the West Northamptonshire district, in the ceremonial county of Northamptonshire in England. The site is a scheduled monument. Nearby are the villages of Old, Lamport and Mawsley and the Northampton and Lamport Railway.

There is now just one house standing on this remote hilltop location, overlooking rolling farmland.

== History ==
It is believed that the name Faxton comes from a Scandinavian personal name Fakr and the Anglo-Saxon tun, meaning Fakr's Farm. This would indicate that Faxton grew from a Viking or Norse settler's farmstead and that the name would date from approximately the 9th century.

The Domesday Book of 1086 names Faxton as the Manor of Fextone, noting that the population was of approximately 60 to 80 people. Archaeological evidence has been found of settlement at Faxton as early as around 1200. The village is documented as having consisted of a church, a rectory, a hall, an aviary, almshouse and a number of ponds. In 1730 Lady Danvers founded the parish's almshouses for four persons and, six years later, her sister Jane Kemsey bequeathed £100 to it.

It has been said that in an attempt to escape the plague in London in 1665, a family relocated to Faxton with their servants, one of whom carried the fatal disease which spread and almost wiped out the village. However, this tale is disproved by comparing the number of householders recorded in the hearth tax lists for Faxton in years before and after that date. 30 householders were listed in 1662, but 34 were recorded for the year ending 25 March 1674.

Former residents have recalled that Faxton could only be reached by horse-drawn vehicles, as none of the roads leading to it were made up to accommodate motor vehicles; they considered that to be a major factor in the decline of the village.

The Northamptonshire Record Office in Wootton holds the christening, marriage and burial registers for the parish.

== Church ==
The Church of England parish church was dedicated to St Denis (or St Denys). The church stood in an isolated position and consisted of chancel and clerestoried nave with a south aisle. Over the west gable was a bell-cote containing two bells.

The church ceased to be used for public worship in 1939. In ca 1940 the church (interior and exterior) was painted by John Piper for the wartime Recording Britain project. It was demolished in 1959.

Wall monuments were removed to the stables of Lamport rectory; in 1965, the Victoria and Albert Museum in London accepted four monuments as a gift and another (the monument to Hester Raynsford, died 1763) was installed in the Church of All Saints, Lamport. The silver cup and paten of 1670 are in All Saints', Lamport. The baptismal font is now in All Saints' Church, Kettering. A treble bell ('St Denys') for the Church of St Laurence, Stanwick, was cast using the metal of two bells from Faxton in 1957.

The Faxton Group is a Church of England benefice of nine parishes: Arthingworth, Draughton, East Farndon, Great Oxendon, Harrington, Lamport with Faxton and Hanging Houghton, and Maidwell.

== Governance ==
Faxton was formerly a chapelry in the parish of Lamport, in 1866 Faxton became a separate civil parish, on 1 April 1935 the parish was abolished and merged with Lamport. In 1931 the parish had a population of 31.

== Augustine Nicolls (1559-1616) ==
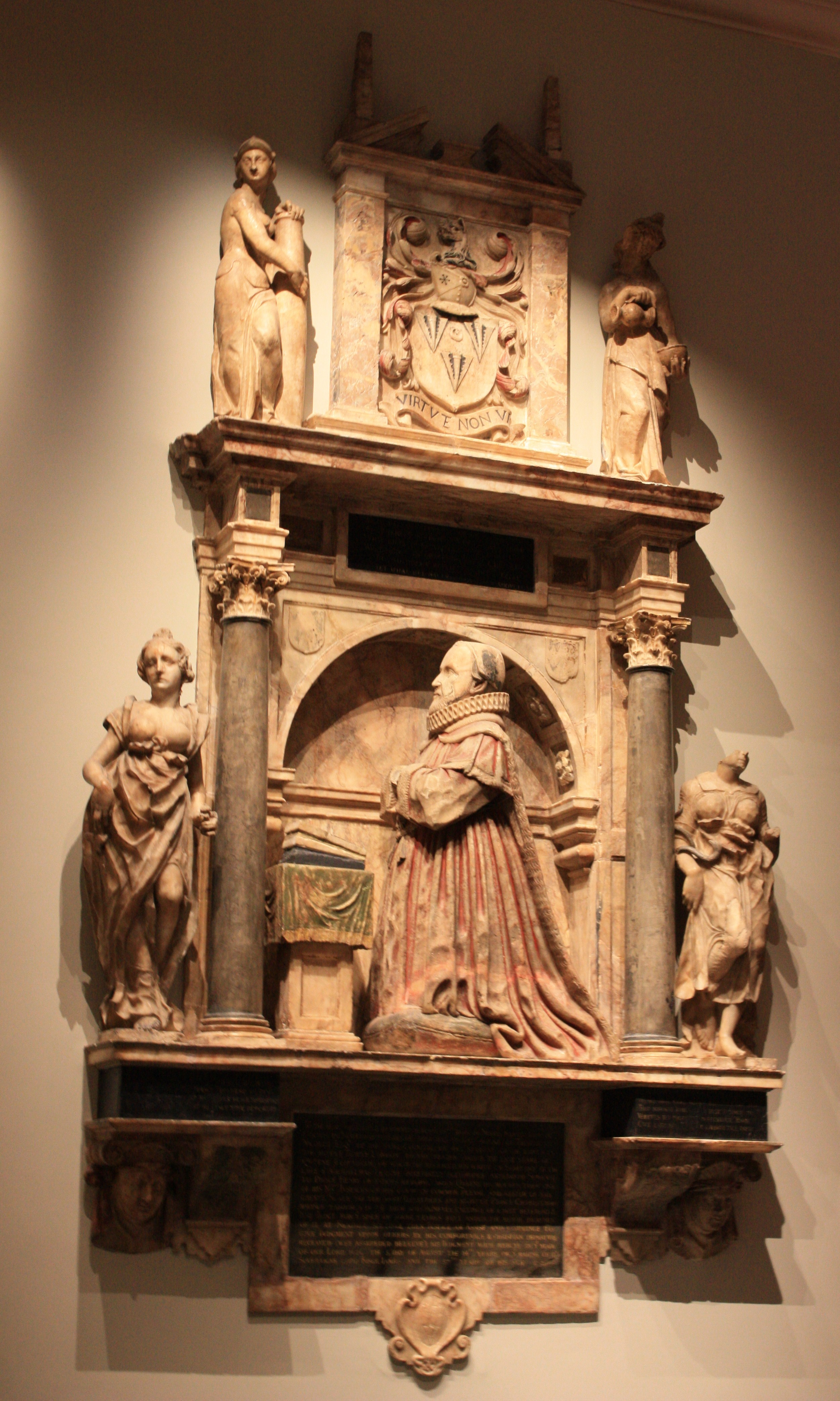
Monument to Augustine Nicolls, now in the Victoria and Albert Museum

Faxton's most famous resident was Sir Augustine Nicolls, a judge of the Court of Common Pleas under James I of England. He was a Knight of the Bath, born in Faxton in 1559; he died in 1616. The manor of Faxton passed to his nephew Sir Francis Nicolls, 1st Baronet. A memorial to Augustine Nicolls, in black marble and alabaster, was removed from the parish church before the church was demolished in 1959. The Victoria and Albert Museum accepted the monument in 1965 and spent three years restoring it. The museum attributes the monument to the sculptor Nicholas Stone.
