= Sir Francis Nicolls, 1st Baronet =

Sir Francis Nicolls, 1st Baronet (sometimes spelt Nichols) (1586 – 4 March 1642) was an English Member of Parliament. He was also the first of the Nicolls baronets.

He was born the eldest son of Francis Nichols of Hardwick, Northamptonshire and was educated at Brasenose College, Oxford. He also entered the Middle Temple in the same year (1602) to study law but was never called to the bar. He succeeded his father in 1604 and inherited land at Faxton in 1616 on the death of his uncle, the judge Sir Augustine Nicholls.

He served as a justice of the peace for Northamptonshire in 1620-26 and from 1628 to his death. He was made a commissioner for oyer and terminer on the Midlands circuit in 1626. In 1628 he was elected MP for Northamptonshire, sitting until Parliament was suspended the following year by King Charles I. He was pricked High Sheriff of Northamptonshire for 1630–31.

Nicolls was created a baronet on 28 July 1641.

He died in 1642. He had married Mary, the daughter of Edward Bagshawe, vintner, of London and the stepdaughter of his uncle Augustine, with whom he had a son and a daughter. His son Edward was an active parliamentarian.

Parliament of England
| Preceded by Sir William Spencer; Richard Knightley | Member of Parliament for Northamptonshire; 1628–1629; With: Richard Knightley | Parliament suspended until 1640 |
Baronetage of England
| New creation | Baronet (of Hardwick); 1641–1642 | Succeeded by Edward Nicolls |
