= Gerald Nicolls =

The Ven Gerald Edward Nicolls (1862 – 28 February 1937) was Archdeacon of Lahore from 1909 to 1912.

He was born in Allahabad into a military family and educated at Wellington College, Berkshire and Pembroke College, Cambridge. He was ordained deacon in 1885; and priest in 1886. The following year he married Eleanor, 2nd daughter of Colonel J. B. Hardy, RA: they had four sons and one daughter. He served the Diocese of Lahore at Peshawar, Karachi and Shimla before his time as Archdeacon. Afterwards he was Vicar of Skirbeck from 1912 to 1915, Winterbourne Down from 1915 to 1923; Bedminster from 1923 to 1927; and Bishopsworth from 1927 until his death on 28 February 1937.

== Notes ==
Church of England titles
Preceded by Charles Albert Gillmore	Archdeacon of Lahore; 1909–1912	Succeeded by Edmund John Warlow
