= Robert Devenish (Archdeacon of Lahore) =

The Venerable Robert Cecil Sylvester Devenish (22 November 1888 – 23 August 1973) was Archdeacon of Lahore from 1934 to 1940.

He was educated at Trinity College, Dublin and ordained in 1913. He was a Chaplain to the Forces from 1915 to 1919 and then a Chaplain with the Indian Ecclesiastical Establishment. He was Rector of St Paul's Naval and Garrison Church, Esquimalt from 1941 to 1946; Chaplain of Upper Chine School from 1946 to 1951 and Assistant Priest of St Mary Abbots, Kensington from 1951 to 1959.

== Notes ==
Church of England titles
Preceded by Henry Craven Carden	Archdeacon of Lahore; 1934–1940	Succeeded by Mervyn Saxelbye Evers
