= Charlie Devenish =

South African rugby union player

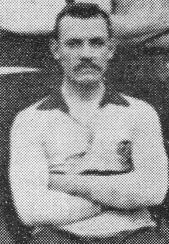
- Born: Charles Edwin Devenish; 13 January 1874 Victoria West, Cape Colony
- Died: 11 January 1922 (aged 47) Kimberley, South Africa

Rugby union career
- Position: Forward
Provincial / State sides
Years	Team	Apps	(Points)
- Griqualand West
- Correct as of 19 July 2010
International career
Years	Team	Apps	(Points)
1896	South Africa	1	(0)
- Correct as of 19 July 2010

Charles Edwin Devenish (13 January 1874 – 11 January 1922) was a South African international rugby union player. Born in Victoria West, he first played provincial rugby for Griqualand West (now known as the Griquas). He made his only Test appearance for South Africa during Great Britain's 1896 tour. He played as a forward in the 2nd Test of the series, a 17–8 loss at the Wanderers. Devenish died in 1922, in Kimberley, at the age of 47.
