= Augustine Nicolls =

English judge

Sir Augustine Nicolls or Nicholls (1559–1616) was an English judge.

== Life ==
Nicolls was born at Ecton, Northamptonshire, in April 1559. He was the second son of Thomas Nicholls, serjeant-at-law, by Anne, daughter of John Pell of Ellington, Huntingdonshire. The Wardour Abbey manor in Ecton had been in the family for three generations, having been purchased by Augustine's grandfather, William Nicolls or Nicoll, of Hardwicke, Northamptonshire, who died in 1575.

Nicolls trained in the common law, and became reader at the Middle Temple in the autumn of 1602. On 11 February 1603 Elizabeth I summoned him to become serjeant-at-law by taking the degree of the coif; but she died before the writ was returnable, and it had to be renewed by James I. Nicolls was sworn on 17 May following. On 14 December 1603 Nicolls was made recorder of Leicester.

In 1610 Nicolls was attached as serjeant to the household of Henry Frederick, Prince of Wales. On 11 June 1610 he, in addition to the Northamptonshire manors of Broughton and Faxton which he had purchased, received a grant in fee simple of the manor of Kibworth-Beauchamp, Leicestershire. On 26 November 1612 he was appointed justice of common pleas, and was knighted at the same time. Three years later his patent was renewed on his appointment as chancellor to Charles, Prince of Wales.

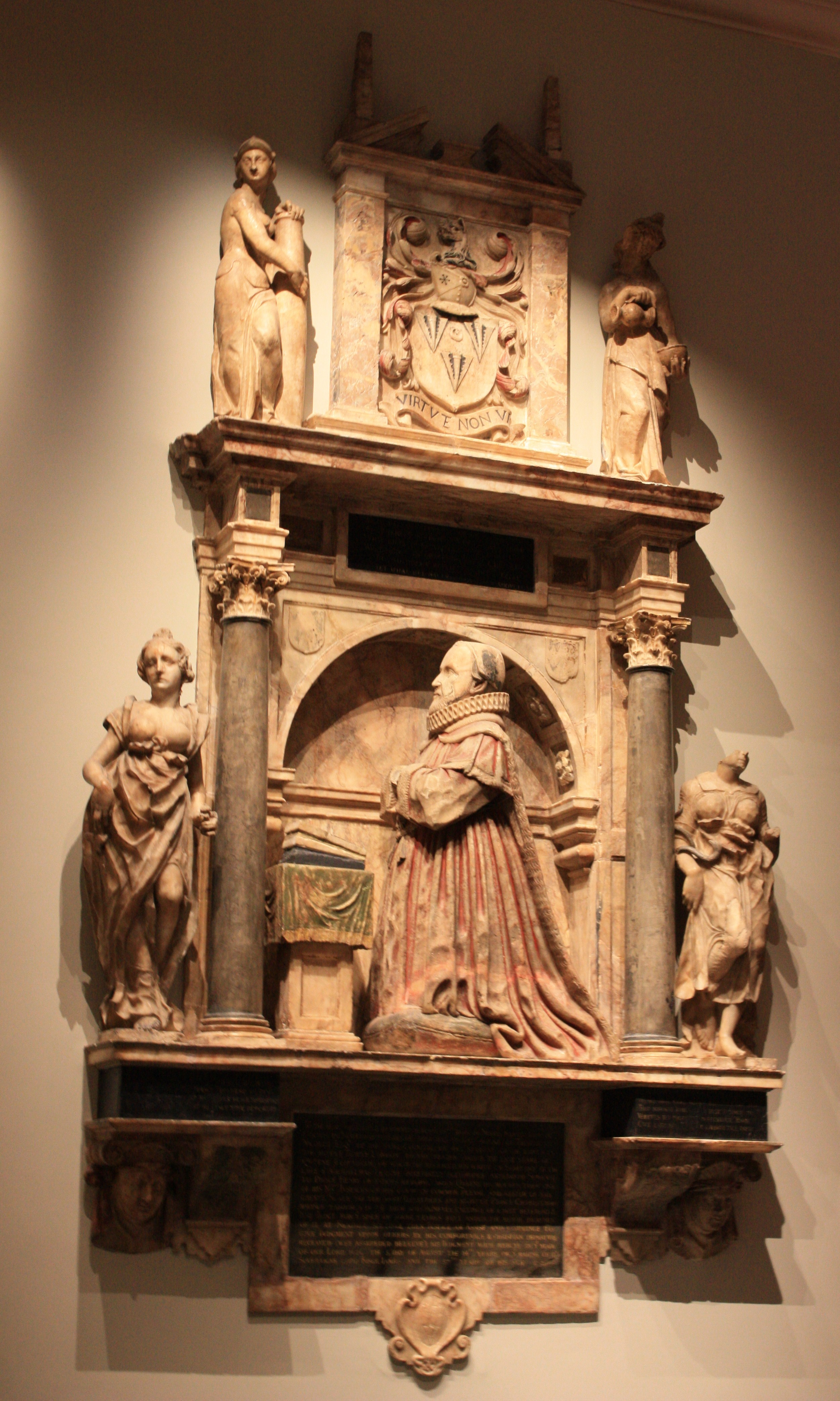
Monument to Sir Augustine Nicolls from Faxton Church, Northamptonshire, now in the Victoria and Albert Museum

Nicolls died unexpectedly on 3 August 1616 while on circuit; the cause has been given as a "surfeit", or the "new ague". He died in Kendal, and there is a monument to his memory in Kendal Parish Church. His tomb, in black marble and alabaster, was in St Denys' Church in Faxton, Northamptonshire. In 1959 Faxton church was demolished; the Victoria and Albert Museum accepted the monument in 1965. The museum attributes the monument to the sculptor Nicholas Stone.

Robert Bolton, whom Nicolls had presented to the living of Broughton, testified to his not accepting bribes.

== Family ==
Nicolls married Mary Hemings of London, widow of Edward Bagshawe; they had no children together. The manor of Faxton passed to his nephew Sir Francis Nicolls, 1st Baronet, son of Francis Nicholls, his elder brother and governor of Tilbury in 1588, by Anne, daughter of David Seymour. Sir Francis had married his stepdaughter, Mary Bagshawe.

Judge Nicholls had a clerk working for him, Thomas Dudley, a relation of the Nicholls family. In 1627 Dudley, with his wife, daughter Anne, and her husband Simon Bradstreet, sailed for America. Dudley became Governor of the Massachusetts Bay Colony as did Bradstreet later. Anne Bradstreet became America's first female poet.

== Notes ==
Attribution

This article incorporates text from a publication now in the public domain: Lee, Sidney, ed. (1895). "Nicolls, Augustine". Dictionary of National Biography. Vol. 41. London: Smith, Elder & Co.
