= Msenge Emoyeni Wind Power Station =

Wind farm in South Africa

- Country: South Africa
- Location: Bedford; Raymond Mhlaba Municipality; Amathole District; Eastern Cape
- Coordinates: 32°52′30″S 25°59′55″E
- Status: Operational
- Construction began: April 2023
- Commission date: October 2024
- Owner: ACED-IDEAS-Reatile Consortium

Wind farm
- Type: Onshore

Power generation
- Units operational: 16
- Make and model: Goldwind Science & Technology
- Nameplate capacity: 69 MW
- Annual net output: 552 GWh
- Main Sub-Contractors

The Msenge Emoyeni Wind Power Station is an operational 69 MW (93,000 hp) wind power plant in South Africa. The power station was developed by a consortium of international IPPs and financiers. Commercial operations started in October 2024. The energy generated at this wind farm is sold to Sasol, the South African energy conglomerate, under a long-term power purchase agreement (PPA). The power is transmitted ("wheeled") through the transmission network of Eskom, to Sasol's premises in Sasolburg, Free State.

== Location ==
The power station is located outside of the town of Bedford, in Raymond Mhlaba Municipality, Amathole District, Eastern Cape. Bedford is located approximately 200 kilometres (124 mi) north of Gqeberha, the nearest large city.

== Overview ==
The power station was built, funded and is operated by a consortium referred to as the ACED-IDEAS-Reatile Consortium. This wind farm comprises 16 wind towers, each supporting a 4.5 megawatts generator, manufactured by Goldwind Science and Technology. The generation capacity of the power station is 72 MW, however the contracted supply capacity is 69 MW.

== Developers ==
The table below illustrates the ownership of ACED-IDEAS-Reatile Consortium.

Ownership of ACED-IDEAS-Reatile Consortium
Rank	Shareholder	Domicile	Percentage	Notes
1	African Clean Energy Developments (ACED)	South Africa	62.0	
2	AIIM IDEAS Fund	South Africa	In conjunction with ACED	
3	Reatile Renewables Limited (Reatile)	South Africa	38.0	

== Construction and timeframe ==
The Cape Town-based civil engineering company, Rumdel Construction (Cape) Limited handled the engineering, procurement and construction contract for this wind farm. Construction began in Q2 2023 and concluded in October 2024. Rand Merchant Bank was the lead arranger of the construction loan package.

== See also ==
- List of power stations in South Africa
- Wesley–Ciskei Wind Power Station
- Oyster Bay Wind Power Station
- Garob Wind Power Station
