= Karusa Wind Power Station =

Power station in South Africa

- Country: South Africa
- Location: Laingsburg, Laingsburg Municipality, Central Karoo District, Western Cape
- Coordinates: 32°53′09″S 20°39′23″E
- Status: Operational
- Construction began: January 2019
- Commission date: June 2022
- Construction cost: €200 million
- Owner: Enel Green Power
- Operator: Karusa Wind Energy

Wind farm
- Type: Onshore

Power generation
- Units operational: 35
- Make and model: 4.2 MW
- Nameplate capacity: 147 MW
- Annual net output: ~500 GWh

The Karusa Wind Power Station, is a 147 MW wind-power plant in South Africa. The wind farm which achieved commercial commissioning in June 2022 was developed by Enel Green Power, a subsidiary of Enel, the Italian energy conglomerate. Under a 20-year power purchase agreement, the power station sells the energy generated here to Eskom Holdings, the national electricity utility parastatal company.

== Location ==
The wind farm is located approximately 62.5 kilometres (39 mi), north west of the town of Laingsburg, in the Western Cape Province of South Africa. This is approximately 282 kilometres (175 mi) northeast of Cape Town, the nearest large city.

== Overview ==
The power station comprises 35 turbines manufactured by Vestas, based in Denmark, each rated at 4.2 MW, capable of generating 147 MW at peak production. Enel Green Power won the concession to build this power station in 2016 as part of the 4th window of the Renewable Energy Independent Power Producer Procurement Programme (REIPPP), of the South African government.

== Ownership ==
In 2021, Qatar Investment Authority, the sovereign wealth fund of Qatar, signed a joint venture agreement with Enel Green Power, thereby becoming a co-owner in this power station. The table below illustrates the ownership of Karusa Wind Power Station.

Ownership in Karusa Wind Power Station
Rank	Shareholder	Domicile	Notes
1	Enel Green Power	Italy	
2	Qatar Investment Authority	Qatar	

== Construction ==
The engineering, procurement and construction contract was awarded to Vestas Wind Systems, based in Denmark. Construction began in 2019 and commercial commissioning occurred in June 2022.

== Cost and funding ==
The cost of construction is reported as €200 million. This project received loan support from Absa Group Limited and Nedbank Group, both large South African financial houses.

== Other considerations ==
Karusa Wind Power Station is one of five wind park concessions awarded to Enel Green Power, under the South African government's Renewable Energy Supply Programme (REIPPP). The other four wind farms are Oyster Bay Wind Power Station, Garob Wind Power Station, Nxuba Wind Power Station and Soetwater Wind Power Station. As of July 2022, Enel Green Power had a generation portfolio of 1,257 MW in South Africa, which included wind and solar power stations.

== See also ==
- List of power stations in South Africa
