= Soetwater Wind Power Station =

Wind power station in South Africa

- Country: South Africa
- Location: Sutherland; Karoo Hoogland Municipality; Namakwa District; Northern Cape Province
- Coordinates: 32°45′14″S 20°38′43″E
- Status: Operational
- Construction began: November 2019
- Commission date: July 2022
- Construction cost: US$208 million
- Owner: Enel Green Power
- Operator: EGP

Wind farm
- Type: Onshore

Power generation
- Units operational: 35
- Make and model: Vestas
- Nameplate capacity: 147 MW
- Annual net output: 585 GWh

The Soetwater Wind Power Station is an operational 147 MW (197,000 hp) wind power plant in South Africa. The power station was developed and is owned by Enel Green Power, an IPP and subsidiary of the Italian multinational, ENEL. The energy generated at this wind farm is sold to the South African national electricity utility company Eskom Holdings, under a 20-year power purchase agreement (PPA).

== Location ==
The power station is located outside of the town of Sutherland, in Karoo Hoogland Municipality, in Namakwa District, in Northern Cape Province. Soetwater Wind Farm is located approximately 61 kilometres (38 mi), south of Sutherland. The power station is located about 600 kilometres (373 mi) southeast of Springbok, the headquarters of Namakwa District.

== Overview ==
The power station comprises 35 turbines manufactured by Vestas Wind Systems, based in Denmark, rated at 4.2 MW each, capable of capacity generation of 147 MW. Enel Green Power won the concession to build this power station in 2016 as part of the 4th window of the Renewable Energy Independent Power Producer Procurement Programme (REIPPP), of the South African government.

Soetwater Wind Power Station is one of five wind park concessions awarded to Enel Green Power, under the South African government's Renewable Energy Supply Programme (REIPPP). The other four wind farms are (a) Oyster Bay Wind Power Station (b) Garob Wind Power Station (c) Karusa Wind Power Station and (d) Nxuba Wind Power Station. Each wind farm has installed capacity of between 140 MW and 147 MW.

== Developers ==
The Soetwater Wind Power Station was developed and is owned and currently operated by Enel Green Power, headquartered in Johannesburg, South Africa. Enel Green Power is a subsidiary of ENEL, the Italian energy conglomerate, based in Rome, Italy.

== Funding ==
The construction of this wind farm cost in excess of US$208 million. Funding was partially sources in form of loans, from Absa Group and Nedbank Group, two South African financial houses.

== Other considerations ==
Soetwater wind farm brings Enel Green Power's portfolio in South Africa to seven wind farms, with generation capacity in excess of 800 MW. It is calculated that the wind farm adds 585 GWh to the South African national grid every year. This enables the country avoid the emission of 600,000 tonnes of carbon dioxide annually.

== See also ==
- List of power stations in South Africa
