= Roggeveld Wind Farm =

Wind farm in South Africa

Roggeveld Wind Power Station
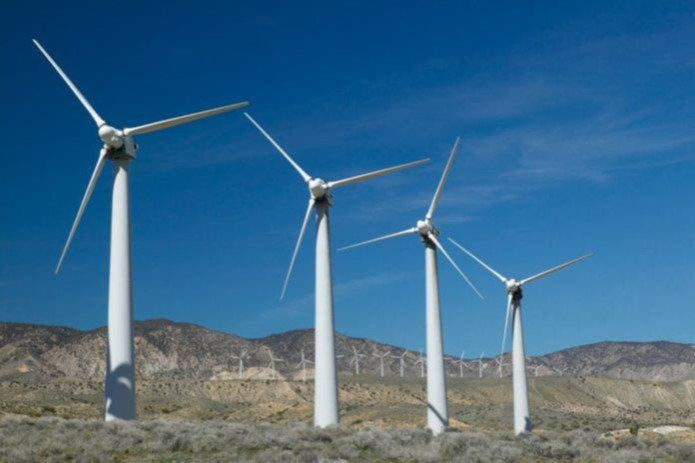
- Country: South Africa
- Location: Matjiesfontein, Central Karoo District Municipality, Western Cape Province
- Coordinates: 32°57′05″S 20°32′55″E
- Status: Operational
- Commission date: March 2022
- Construction cost: US$284 million
- Owner: Building Energy
- Operator: Red Rocket South Africa (Pty) Limited

Wind farm
- Type: Onshore

Power generation
- Units operational: 47
- Make and model: Nordex
- Nameplate capacity: 147 MW
- Annual net output: 613 GWh

External links
- Website: roggeveldwindfarm.energy

The Roggeveld Wind Power Station is an operational 147 MW (197,000 hp) wind power plant in South Africa. The power station, which began commercial operations in March 2022, was originally developed by G7 Renewable Energies between 2009 and 2015 and thereafter by Red Rocket (formerly known as Building Energy) who owns and operates the project. The energy generated at this wind farm is sold to the South African national electricity utility company Eskom, under a 20-year power purchase agreement (PPA).

== Location ==
The power station is located about 35 kilometres (22 mi) north of the town of Matjiesfontein, in Central Karoo District Municipality, Western Cape Province. The wind farm straddles the border between Northern Cape Province and Western Cape Province, approximately 269 kilometres (167 mi), northeast of the coastal city of Cape Town.

The geographical coordinates of Roggeveld Wind Power Station are 32°57'05.0"S, 20°32'55.0"E (Latitude:-32.951389; Longitude:20.548611).

== Overview ==
The concession for this wind farm was awarded to G7 Renewable Energies of South Africa in 2015, as part of the fourth round of the Renewable Energy Independent Power Producer Procurement Programme (REIPPPP), of the Republic of South Africa. G7 signed a 20-year power purchase agreement with Eskom. Building Energy, a subsidiary of Red Rocket, took over the concession, in or after 2018. The design called for the installation of 44 Nordex turbines, rated at 3.15MW and 3 turbines rated at 3MW, for a total installed capacity of 147MW.

== Construction ==
The engineering, procurement and construction (EPC) contract was awarded to Nordex, a German manufacturer of electric wind turbines. Concor, a South African construction company was a sub-contractor on the civil works. Nordex was also awarded a 15-year service contract for the wind farm, by the owners.

== Funding ==
Total construction costs for this wind farm are reported to amount to US$284 million. The list of funders for this energy infrastructure project includes:

- Development Bank of Southern Africa
- Rand Merchant Bank
- Old Mutual

== See also ==
- List of power stations in South Africa
- Garob Wind Power Station
- Oyster Bay Wind Power Station
- Kangnas Wind Power Station
