= Nxuba Wind Power Station =

South African wind farm

- Country: South Africa
- Location: Bedford; Amathole District; Eastern Cape Province
- Coordinates: 32°44′30″S 25°56′47″E
- Status: Operational
- Construction began: 2018
- Commission date: 27 October 2020
- Construction cost: €240 million
- Owner: Enel Green Power
- Operator: EGP

Wind farm
- Type: Onshore

Power generation
- Nameplate capacity: 140 MW
- Annual net output: 460 GWh

The Nxuba Wind Power Station is an operational 140 MW (190,000 hp) wind power plant in South Africa. The power station was developed and is owned by Enel Green Power, an IPP and subsidiary of the Italian multinational, ENEL. The energy generated at this wind farm is sold to the South African national electricity utility company Eskom, under a 20-year power purchase agreement (PPA).

== Location ==
The power station is located near the town of Bedford, in Raymond Mhlaba Municipality, in Amathole District, in Eastern Cape Province. Nxuba Wind farm is located approximately 19 kilometres (12 mi), southwest of Bedford. The power station is located about 76.5 kilometres (48 mi) west of Fort Beaufort, the headquarters of Raymond Mhlaba Local Municipality. This is approximately 268 kilometres (167 mi), west of the city of East London, the district headquarters. The geographical coordinates of Nxuba Wind Farm are 32°44'30.0"S, 25°56'47.0"E (Latitude:-32.741667; Longitude:25.946389).

== Overview ==
Nxuba Wind Power Station is one of five wind park concessions awarded to Enel Green Power, under the South African government's Renewable Energy Supply Programme (REIPPP). The other four wind farms are (a) Oyster Bay Wind Power Station (b) Garob Wind Power Station (c) Karusa Wind Power Station and (d) Soetwater Wind Power Station. Each wind farm has installed capacity of between 140 MW and 147 MW.

== Developers ==
The Nxuba Wind Power Station was developed and is owned and currently operated by Enel Green Power, headquartered in Rome, Italy.

== Funding ==
The construction of the five wind farms listed above was budgeted at €1.2 billion. Two South African financial houses, Absa Group and Nedbank Group jointly lent €950 million (79.17 percent) towards the five power stations. Enel Green Power contributed €250 million (20.83 percent) as equity.

== Other considerations ==
It is calculated that the wind farm adds 460 GWh to the South African national grid every year. This enables the country avoid the emission of 500,000 tonnes of carbon dioxide annually.

== See also ==
- List of power stations in South Africa
