= Golden Valley Wind Energy Facility =

Wind farm in South Africa

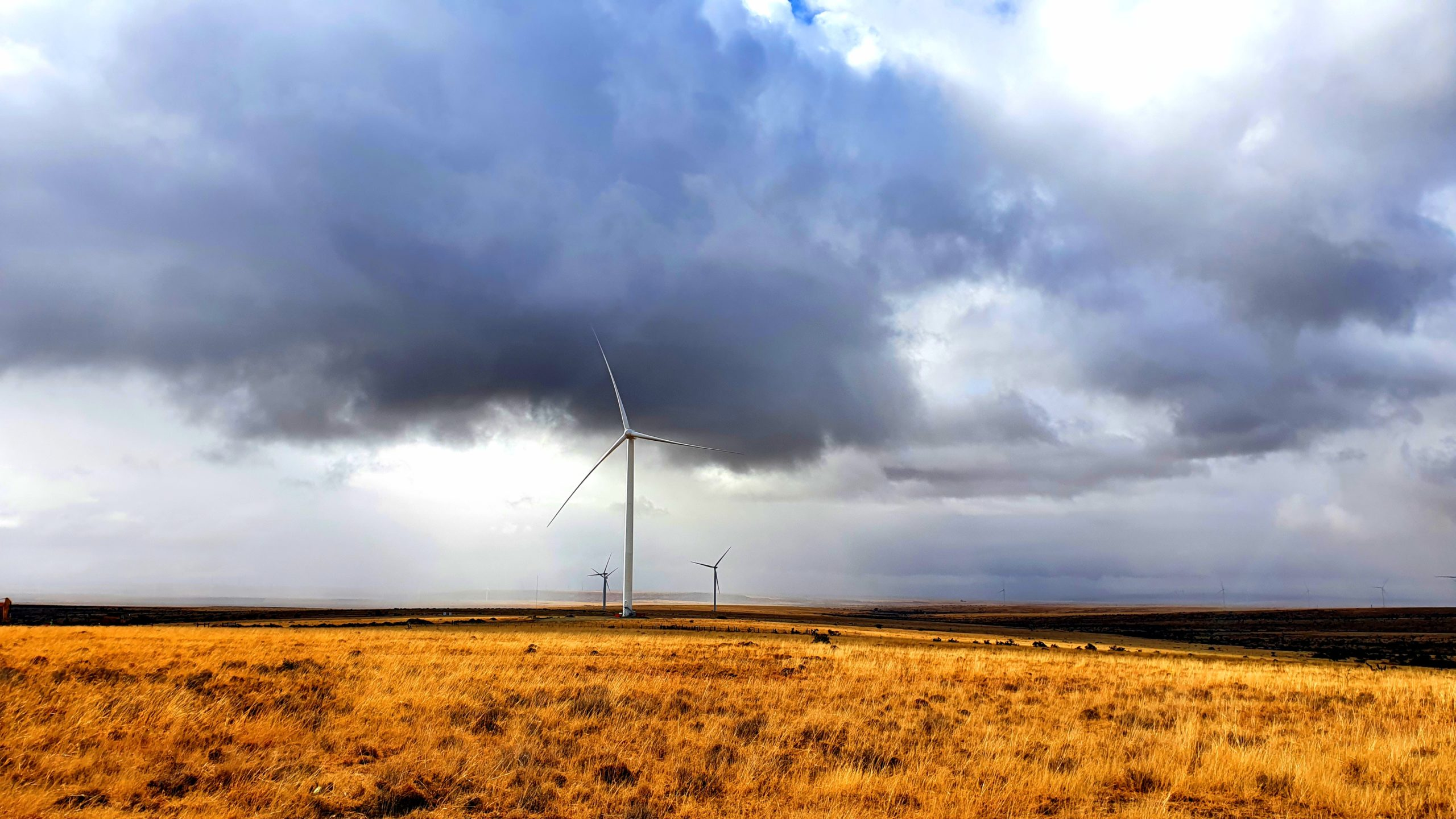
- Wind turbine developed by Goldwind of China
- Country: South Africa
- Location: Amathole District Municipality
- Coordinates: 32.88740999351805°S 25.941866022893215°E
- Status: Commissioned
- Construction began: November 2018
- Commission date: 2021
- Owners: BioTherm Energy, Letsatsi Trust, The Golden Valley Wind Facility Community Trust
- Operator: Goldwind

Wind farm
- Type: Onshore

Power generation
- Units operational: 48
- Make and model: Goldwind: Goldwind Permanent Magnet Generator with Gearless Direct Drive Rotor 2.5 MW
- Nameplate capacity: 120MW
- Main Sub-Contractors: Concor (Construction), OptiPower, A Division of Murray & Roberts (Electrical & Fibre Optics), Vanguard (Specialized Lifting)

The Golden Valley Wind Energy Facility (or "Golden Valley Wind Farm") is a wind farm in the Amathole District Municipality, built within the wind energy generation zone located in the centre of Bedford, Cookhouse and Somerset East, in the Eastern Cape province of South Africa.

The Golden Valley Wind Energy Facility forms part of a cluster of wind generating plants within the wind energy generation zone, and is neighbored by the Nxuba Wind Power Station, Cookhouse Wind Farm and Amathole Wind Farm. The wind farm is owned by BioTherm Energy (wholly owned by Actis), Letsatsi Trust and the Golden Valley Wind Facility Community Trust - jointly Amstilite (Pty) Ltd - who appointed Goldwind as the EPC contractor for the project. In turn, the EPC contractor appointed Concor to build the civil balance of plant, OptiPower, a division of Murray & Roberts for the electrical balance of plant, and Vanguard for specialized lifting.

== Planning and approval ==
The wind farm forms part of the South Africa Renewable Energy Independent Power Producer Programme (REIPPP), and was awarded within the REIPPP bid window round 4. The initial Environmental & Heritage Impact Assessments were concluded in October 2010; however, this initial assessment encompassed the total project scope of 126 turbines, which later saw the construction of the plant split into two portions, with 48 wind turbine generators being constructed in phase 1 of the Golden Valley Wind Energy Facility project, and the remainder in phase 2.

== Funding and construction ==
Due to the decision to construct the wind energy facility in phases, the name of the plant constructed under Phase 1 was henceforth known as Golden Valley Wind Energy Facility, and the plant which is planned for construction under Phase 2 will be known as Golden Valley II Wind Energy Facility. The construction of the plant began in November 2018, and the wind farm achieved its first connection to the South African electrical grid on 17 December 2020. The expected date for commercial operation is in February 2021.

Goldwind was appointed as the EPC contractor for the project. In turn, the EPC contractor appointed Concor to build the civil balance of plant, OptiPower, a division of Murray & Roberts for the electrical balance of plant, and Vanguard for specialized lifting.

== Technology ==
The Golden Valley Wind Energy Facility includes in its scope of build the erection of 48 wind turbine generators, developed by Goldwind. The wind turbine generators are permanent magnet generators with gearless direct drive rotors.
