= Impofu Wind Power Farms Complex =

Wind farm complex in South Africa

- Country: South Africa
- Location: Impofu, Kouga; Sarah Baartman District; Eastern Cape Province
- Coordinates: 34°06′04″S 24°31′48″E
- Status: Under construction
- Construction began: March 2024
- Commission date: 2026 Expected
- Construction cost: ZAR:9 billion (US$480 million)
- Owner: Enel Green Power
- Operator: Enel Green Power

Wind farm
- Type: Onshore

Power generation
- Units operational: 57 x 5.8 MW = 330.6 MW
- Nameplate capacity: 3 x 110 MW = 330 MW

The Impofu Wind Power Farms Complex (IWPFC), is a cluster of three wind power plants under construction in South Africa. The power stations together with the associated high-voltage substations and 120 kilometres (75 mi) of 132 kV overhead power lines are expected to generate 330 MW of power. The power is then expected to be transmitted to Secunda in Mpumalanga, where the French industrial group Air Liquide, will use the power in the largest oxygen-production plant in the world, that is located there. The power will be transmitted from the wind farms to the off-taker by Eskom, the national electricity utility company under a long-term "wheeling agreement".

== Location ==
The three power stations, "Impofu East Wind Power Station", "Impofu West Wind Power Station" and "Impofu North Wind Power Station" are located in Impofu, in Kouga Municipality, Sarah Baartman District, in the Eastern Cape Province of South Africa.

Humansdorp, the nearest large town is located approximately 90 kilometres (56 mi), by road, west of Gqeberha, the nearest large city. This is about 664 kilometres (413 mi), by road, east of Cape Town, the second largest city in South Africa.

== Overview ==
The power stations complex is owned and is under development by Enel Green Power, the 100 percent subsidiary of the Italian energy conglomerate Enel. The design calls for three adjacent wind farms, with a total of 57 wind turbines. Each turbine is rated at 5.8 MW. A total of eight high-voltage substations and approximately 120 kilometres (75 mi) of 132kV high voltage overhead transmission line will deliver the 330 MW of power generated here, to a location where it will enter the Eskom grid. The power stations occupy 12 pieces of land and the power line sits on 87 separate pieces of real estate, all leased from local farmers. In Secunda, the power supplied is expected to power the 16 "air separation units" (ASUs) operated by the French industrial group Air Liquide, to produce oxygen.

== Development ==
Red Cap Energy (Pty) Limited (RCEPL), a South African renewable energy development company based in Cape Town, has been working on this project for at least 10 years before construction began. In 2017, RCEPL hired Zutari, a South African consulting engineering firm to carry out environmental impact assessments (EIAs) for the three Impofu wind farms, and for a 120 km-long 132 kV overhead high-voltage power line to Gqeberha.

== Construction costs ==
The construction budget is estimated at ZAR:9 billion (approx. US$480 million).

== See also ==
- List of power stations in South Africa
- Wesley–Ciskei Wind Power Station
- Kangnas Wind Power Station
