= Umburanas, Bahia =

Umburanas Município de Umburanas
- Municipality
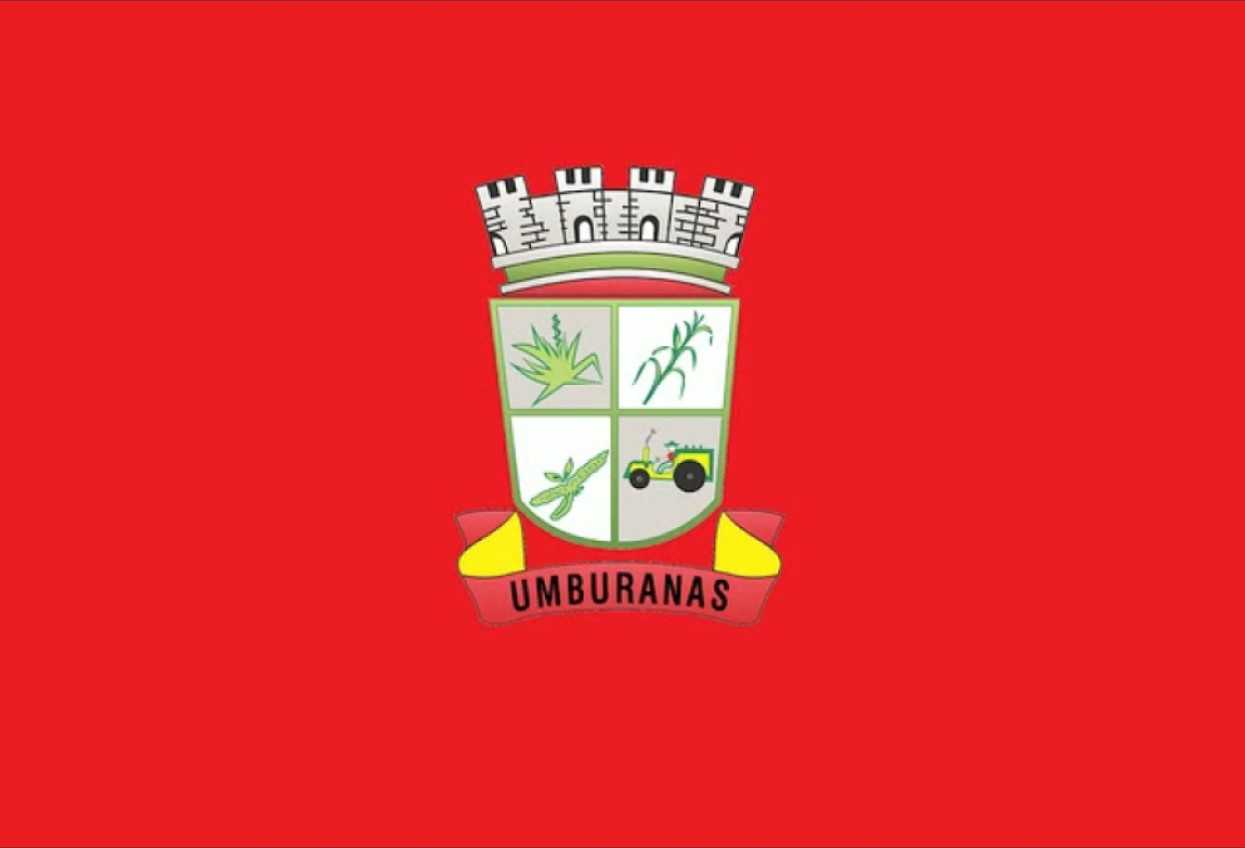
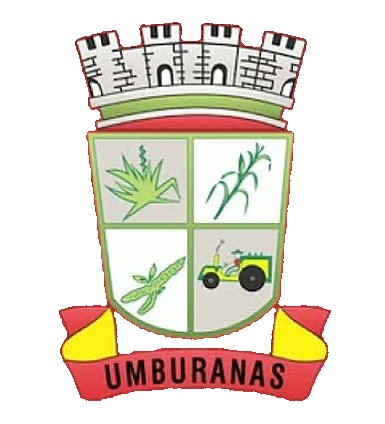
- Flag Coat of arms

- Location of Umburanas in Bahia

- Location of Umburanas in the Brazil
- Coordinates: 10°43′58″S 41°19′33″W
- Country: Brazil
- Region: Northeast
- State: Bahia

Government
  - Mayor: Raimundo Nonato da Silva (PSDB, 2009–2012)

Area
  - Total: 1,775.63 km^{2} (685.57 sq mi)

Population (2020)
  - Total: 19,402
  - Density: 10.927/km^{2} (28.300/sq mi)
- Demonym: umburanense
- Time zone: UTC−3 (BRT)
- Website: www.umburanas.ba.io.org.br

Umburanas is a municipality in the state of Bahia in the North-East region of Brazil. Umburanas covers 1,775.633 km^{2} (685.576 mi^{2}), and has a population of 19,402 with a population density of 10.2 inhabitants per square kilometer. The municipality is located within the caatinga ecoregion. Umburanas borders on five municipalities: Ourolândia, Mirangaba, Campo Formoso, Morro do Chapéu, and Sento Sé, all in the state of Bahia.

== See also ==
- List of municipalities in Bahia
