= Campo Moro dams =

Pair of dams in Lanzada, Italy

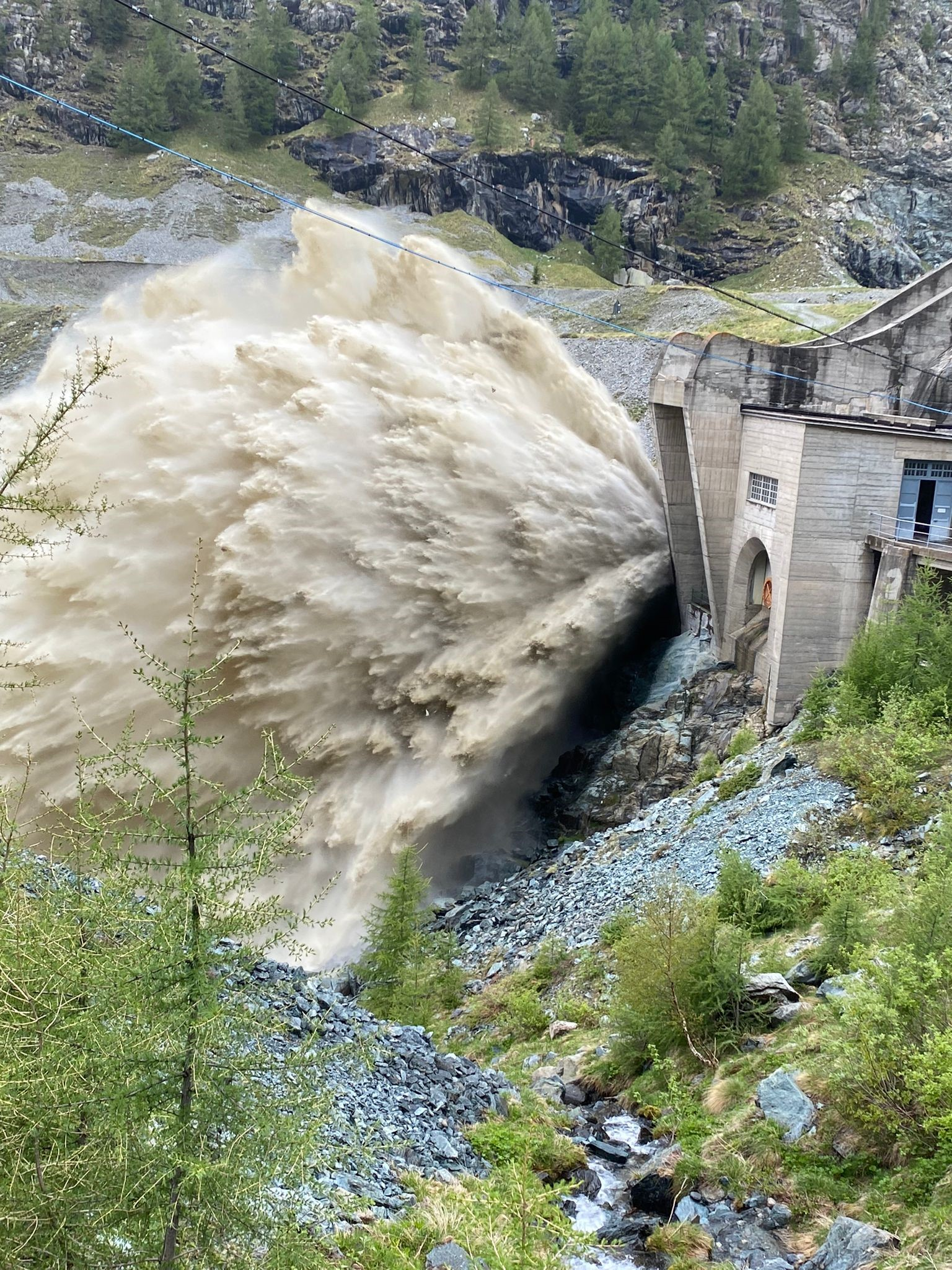

- Location within Italy
- Official name: Dighe di Campo Moro
- Country: Italy
- Location: Lanzada (SO)
- Coordinates: 46°18′24″N 9°55′36″E
- Purpose: Hydroelectric power
- Status: in use
- Construction began: 1956
- Opening date: 1958
- Owner: Enel
- Operator: Enel

Upper dam and spillways
- Type of dam: Gravity dam
- Impounds: Cormor, Val Confinale Creek, Campo Moro Creek
- Height: 174 m (571 ft)
- Length: 530 m (1,740 ft)
- Width (crest): 528 m (1,732 ft)
- Width (base): 180 m (590 ft)
- Dam volume: 1,700,000 m^{3} (60,000,000 cu ft)
- Spillways: 2
- Spillway type: Howell-Bunger
- Spillway length: 620 m (2,030 ft)
- S pillway volumetric flow rate: 100 m^{3}/s (3,500 cu ft/s)

Upper reservoir
- Total capacity: 68,000,000 m^{3} (2.4×10^{9} cu ft)

Lower dam and spillways
- Type of dam: Gravity dam
- Height: 96 m (315 ft)
- Length: 180 m (590 ft)
- Spillway length: 133 m (436 ft)

Lower reservoir
- Total capacity: 11,000,000 m^{3} (390,000,000 cu ft)

Campo Moro power station
- Commission date: 1965
- Type: Conventional
- Annual generation: 33'000'000 KwH

The Campo Moro dams are a pair of hydroelectric-gravity dams situated in Lanzada, in the province of Sondrio, Lombardy (Northern Italy). The two dams are called Alpe Gera dam and Campo Moro dam. Alpe Gera, the largest of the pair, was constructed with approximately 1,800,000 m^{3} of concrete to create the Alpe Gera reservoir (in Italian: Bacino di Alpe Gera). The lower dam, Campo Moro, was created to form the Campo Moro reservoir (in Italian: Bacino di Campo Moro).

== Location ==
The dams of Campo Moro are located in Valmalenco, which is a valley in the Bernina range, a subrange of the Rhaetian Alps, approximately 150 kilometres (93 mi) north of Milan. The closest municipality to the dams is Lanzada (SO), although Chiesa in Valmalenco is the largest and best known nearby. The Campo Moro dams are accessible by car.

== Features ==
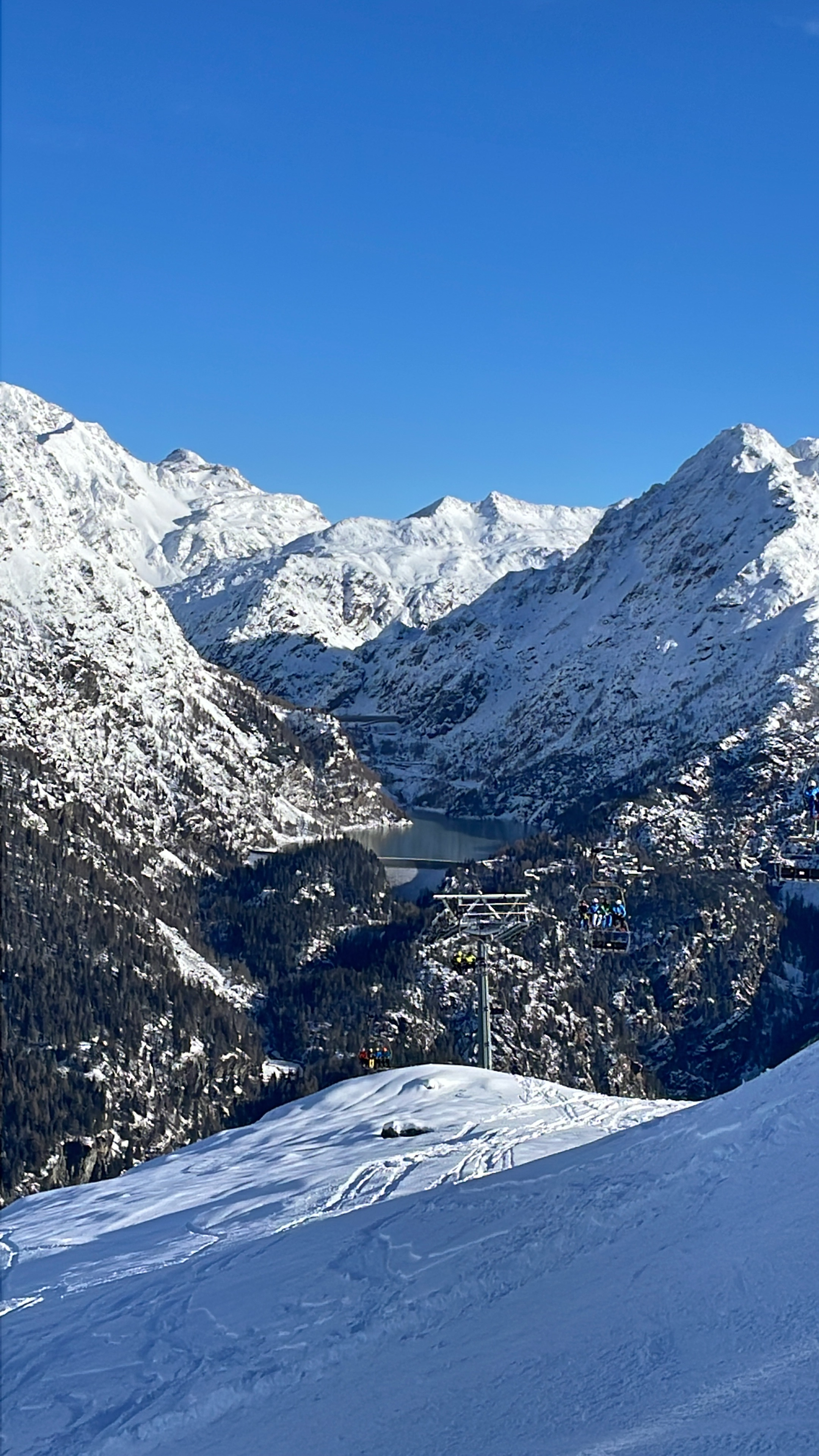
Campo Moro dams, viewed from the Valmalenco ski resort

=== Campo Moro dam ===
The Campo Moro dam is a huge structure composed of two distinct gravity dams, split by a rocky spur. The western side has a stone-built dam, reaching 32 metres (105 ft) in height and spanning 150 metres (490 ft) in length. In contrast, the eastern dam is made of concrete, with a height of 96 metres (315 ft) and extending across 180 metres (590 ft) . The reservoir formed by Campo Moro holds a maximum capacity of 11 million m^{3} of water. It is fed by the waters collected in the Alpe Gera basin, at an altitude of 2,125 metres (6,972 ft). As this water makes its way towards the Campo Moro power plant, it goes down an average descent of approximately 133 metres (436 ft).

=== Alpe Gera dam ===
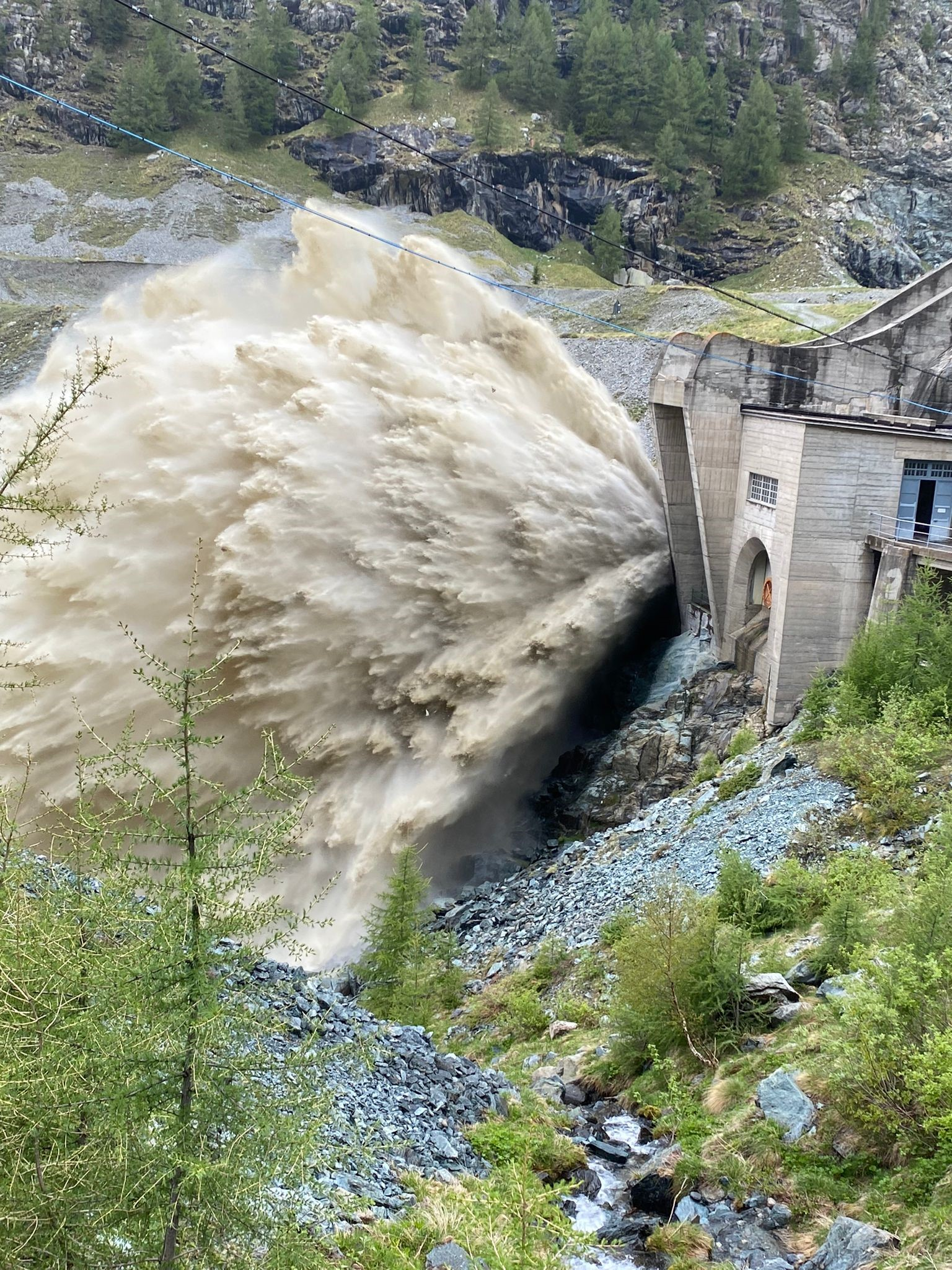
Alpe Gera dam

The Alpe Gera dam is an imposing concrete gravity structure with a rectilinear shape that extends for 530 metres (1,740 ft) and reaches a height of 174 metres (571 ft), containing a total volume of 1,700,000 m^{3}. The body of the dam is divided by contraction joints equally separated by 12 metres (39 ft).

On the upstream side of the dam, walls are covered with a coating of sheet metal panels 2 metres (6.6 ft) wide, 1.4 metres (4.6 ft) high and 3 millimetres (0.12 in) thick. Behind them, drainage pipes have been arranged to prevent infiltration, thus completing the drainage system, which also includes a series of holes in the rock. Inside the dam, seventy-two instruments constantly monitor temperatures, while many other devices keep structural stresses under control. Movements on the plane and in height are verified through specific triangulations. The dam is crossed by ten tunnels connected to each other longitudinally. At its highest point, the dam is equipped with one of the highest systems of elevators in Europe, which move vertically for 140 metres (460 ft).

== History ==
Prior to the construction of the dams the Lanzada power station was built in 1955. The Campo Moro dam, the first and lower of the two dams, was built between 1956 and 1958. It consists of two parts, the east dam and the smaller west dam, separated by a single rocky spur. Following the construction of the Sondrio power station in 1960, the upper dam, Alpe Gera, was erected between 1961 and 1964 at an altitude of 2,000 metres (6,600 ft) a.s.l. Just a year later, in 1965, the central Campo Moro power station was built within an artificial cave and represents the highest in the series built in the Valmalenco and Sondrio area.

Later projects utilized “micro-stations” to assist with the conversion of energy in areas such as Chiareggio in 1995, and on the Lanterna stream in Tornadri in 2001. In 2002 a further three power stations were constructed on: the Basci stream, Giummellini; the San Giuseppe Entovascos stream; and, near the Franscia on the Scerscen stream.

To this day, Valmalenco, 'the valley of water', provides fresh water and energy to its region, representing 17% of the regional supply.

== Electricity ==
The Campo Moro lake is one of two artificial sources of hydroelectricity produced in Valmalenco, and the Campo Moro power station is one of three local power stations. The other two are at Lanzada (1000 meters a.s.l) and Sondrio (altitude 300 meters a.s.l).

=== Catchment Area ===
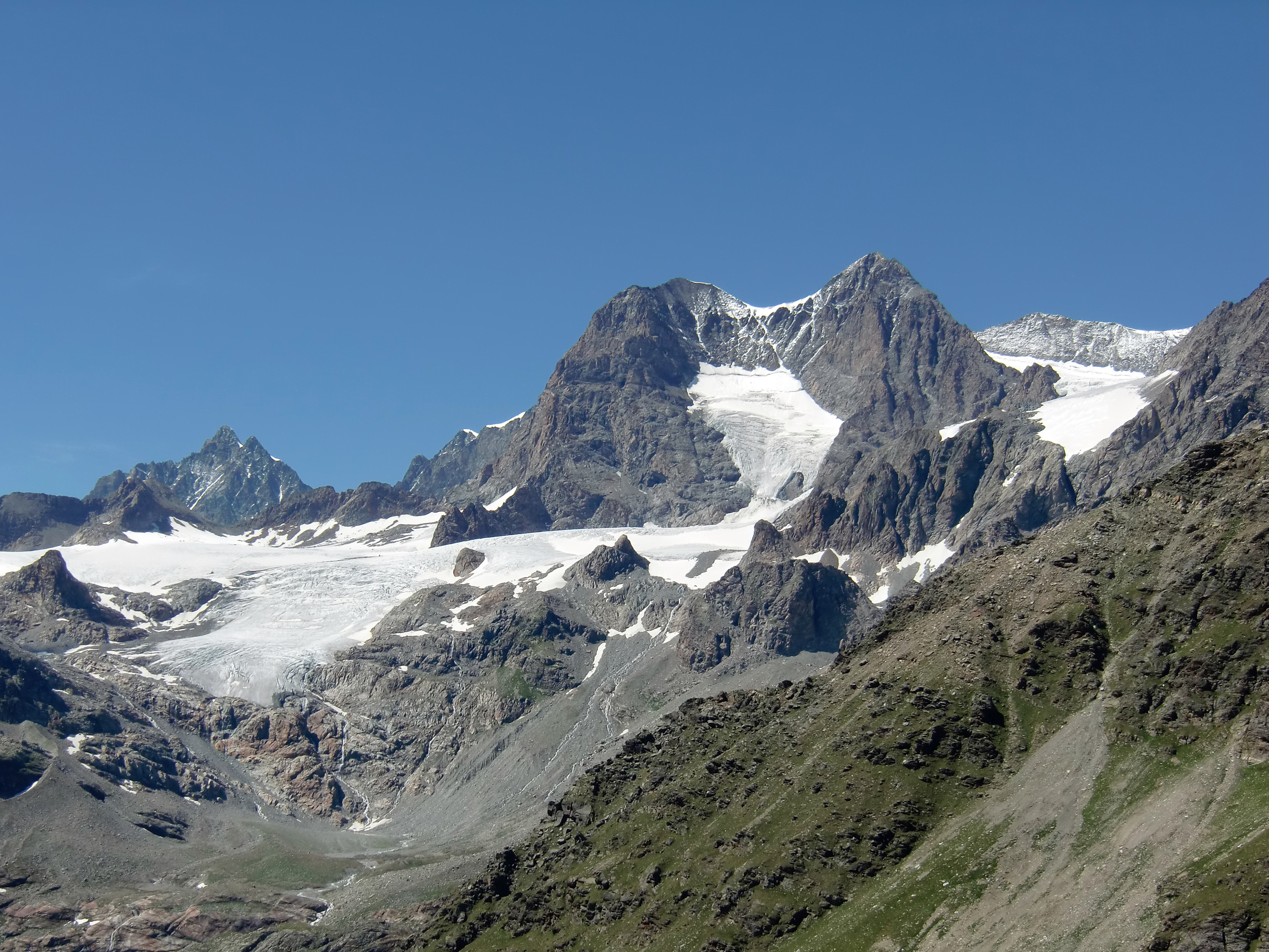
The Fellaria Glacier, one of the water resources of the dams

The water catchment area of the Campo Moro dams comes from the Fellaria and Scersen glaciers in the Bernina range, the largest glacial mountain range in Italy, located east of the Gotthard Pass (Switzerland). The range includes summits such as Mount Cevedale (3779 meters a.s.l.), Mount Adamello (3539 meters a.s.l.), and Piz Bernina (4049 meters a.s.l.). The Piz Bernina is the source of the Fellaria glacier in the upper reached of Valmalenco on the plateau of Fellaria, with a maximum altitude of 3,500 metres (11,500 ft) a.s.l. This glacier's ice melts into Lake Gera and provides the water used by the power stations.

The Scerscen Glacier, located on the border between Switzerland and Italy, is another water resource of the Alpe Gera basin.

=== Campo Moro power station ===
The Campo Moro power station is situated at 2,000 metres (6,600 ft) a.s.l. and was constructed in 1965. It was built inside an artificial cave that is linked to the outside by a 570-metre-long (1,870 ft) gallery. It produces approximately 33 million Kilowatt-hours (kWh) of energy a year, which provides for the needs of 14,000 households. The water used in the electricity generation unit is returned to the Campo Moro reservoir and redirected towards the Lazanda power station by an 8,000-metre (26,000 ft) tunnel. The energy production of the two artificial reservoirs makes Valmalenco and the Sondrio region Italy’s largest producers of hydroelectric energy, with 12% of the national supply, and provides energy to Milan and its province.

=== Lanzada power station ===
The 'Alfredo Pizzoli' hydroelectric plant, also called Lanzada power station, is situated in Lanzada at 1,000 metres (3,300 ft) altitude a.s.l. It is the second component of the Valmalenco hydroelectric system, which derives its energy from the Alpe Gera and Campo Moro dams. The Lanzada power station is owned by Enel and has a capacity of 190.7 megawatts (MW) and can produce on average around 300 gigawatt-hours (GWh) per year, which can supply 111,000 families. The power station was constructed between 1957 and 1962 and is still active today. The power station has three turbines. It uses the two reservoirs and the water coming from the Compo Moro power station to produce electricity.

=== Sondrio Power station ===
The Sondrio power station was designed by the architect Giovanni Muzio and constructed between 1959 and 1960. It was commissioned by the Società Edison and is now used by Enel Energy. The hydroelectric power station was designed by Muzio to combine functionality and aesthetics, to integrate the structure into the surrounding mountainous landscape. The building emerges as a grand glass portal, serving as the terminus for the entire system connected to the Campo Moro reservoir, linked to the Lanzada power station.

=== Alpe Gera Lake ===
Alpe Gera Lake seen from above (1954)

The lake of Alpe Gera supplies the Valmalenco power stations with water. It is located in Italy's upper Valmalenco region, is one of the country's largest man-made reservoirs, and is placed at an altitude of over 2,051 metres (6,729 ft) a.s.l. with a surface area of 1.15 square kilometres (0.44 sq mi).

== Mountain huts ==
=== Rifugio Zoia ===
Constructed in 1929 and renovated in 2007, Rifugio Zoia stands at 2,021 metres (6,631 ft) a.s.l. in the Bernina Range. The Refuge is accessible by a 5-minute walk from the parking area near the lower Campo Moro dam. It is a starting point for climbers and walkers, and connects to trails of varying difficulty in Valmalenco.

=== Rifugio Bignami ===
Rifugio Bignami is located above Lake Gera and overlooks the eastern Fellaria glacier. It is frequented by mountain walkers, mountaineers and alpine skiers.

=== Rifugio Poschiavino ===
Rifugio Poschiavino is located in Campo Moro and it is a starting point for mountain excursions in the Bernina group.

== Recreational activities ==
=== Cycling ===
- In 2018 Campo Moro was included in 'Cycling the Dams', a collaborative sustainability project by Il Sole 24 Ore and Enel.
- A cycle route to the dams starts in Chiesa in Valmalenco, goes through Lanzada and Campo Franscia to reach the Campo Moro car park after a 16 km (10 mi) ride. From the dams, there are a number of rougher mountain bike trails.

=== Power Station tours ===
- The Lanzada power station is open to the public for tours to see how water power functions. It is a collaboration with Enel and the Sondrio and Valmalenco tourist consortium.

=== Mountain Walking & Climbing ===
Campo Moro is the starting point for a large number of mountain excursions:

- The Italian Normal route on the Piz Bernina (4049 meters a.s.l.). starts at 1900 meters from the Compo Moro dams and is a grade III mountaineering route.
- A gradual uphill walking route to Campo Franscia starts from the Campo Moro dam, traversing the two dams, passing under the second one.
- The itinerary from Campo Moro to Chiareggio (1612 m) starts from the Zoia hut (2021 meters a.s.l) in Campo Moro and takes approximately six hours and thirty minutes. The route has a vertical descent of 400 metres (1,300 ft) and is accessible to all levels of walker. Chiareggio is the starting point for mountaineering itineraries in the Ventina-Disgrazia Group.

== See also ==
- List of dams and reservoirs
- Hydroelectricity in Italy
