= Enel Green Power =

Italian renewable energy corporation

Enel Green Power S.p.A.
- Type: Società per azioni
- Traded as: BIT: ENEL
- Industry: Energy
- Founded: December 2008; 17 years ago
- Headquarters: Rome, Italy
- Key people: Paolo Scaroni (Chairman); Salvatore Bernabei
- Products: Wind power, solar energy, geothermal energy, hydroelectricity
- Number of employees: 9,000 (2024)
- Parent: Enel
- Website: www.enelgreenpower.com

Enel Green Power S.p.A. is an Italian multinational renewable energy corporation, headquartered in Rome. The company was formed as a subsidiary of the power generation firm Enel in December 2008. It has operations in five continents generating energy from solar, geothermal, wind and hydropower sources. As of 2026, it manages a capacity of 67 GW (3,5 GW Storage) and has over 1,400 plants worldwide.

== History ==
Enel Green Power was founded on 1 December 2008 to concentrate all of Enel's activities in the production of renewable energy. At the time of its establishment, Enel was the largest European company in the field of renewable energy, both in terms of installed capacity and international presence. Following its foundation, the activities of the renewable energy branch were gradually transferred to Enel Green Power; these included activities conducted via Enel Produzione SpA in Italy and assets within the possession of Enel Investment Holding abroad, including Enel Latin America BV, Erelis Enel and Endesa.

Between 2011 and 2012, Enel Green Power expanded with wind power throughout the American continents. The wind-powered installation commenced operations in the state of Bahia in Brazil, which generated approximately 30 MW managed by Cristal; this was followed by installations in the United States in Oklahoma (Rocky Ridge with 150 MW) and Kansas (Caney River with 200 MW). In 2012, the 85 MW Palo Viejo hydroelectric power plant was inaugurated in Guatemala.

In 2014, the company was presented with a European Solar Prize by Eurosolar.

From 2010 to 2016, the company was listed on the FTSE MIB index of the Milan Stock Exchange, as well as on the Madrid Stock Exchange and the Barcelona, Bilbao, and Valencia regional Stock Exchanges.

After the launching of the 17 Sustainable Development Goals (SDGs) by the United Nations Assembly in 2016, Enel Green Power integrated the SDGs objectives into its industrial strategy, in particular those relating to quality of education (SDG 4), clean and economically accessible energy (SDG 7), dignity of work and economic growth (SDG 8), fight against climate change (SDG 13). Following that, power plants were constructed in various locations, including South Africa, Ethiopia (100 MW Metehara), Australia (Bungala Solar), and South America, notably in Peru (Wayra I wind farm and Rubì solar plant), in Guatemala (El Canadà hydroelectric power station), in Mexico (Cielito Lindo, with a capacity of over 1 GW of photovoltaic power connected to the grid, Amistad (220 MW), Amistad II (100 MW) and Salitrillos (103 MW) wind farms.

In 2017, the company partnered with Anheuser-Busch to provide enough renewable energy from Enel's Oklahoma wind farm to meet Budweiser's needs for 15 years.

On October 25, 2023, Enel Green Power announced the sale of its stakes in Romania to the Greek company Public Power Corporation S.A., as outlined in the sales agreement signed on March 9, 2023. This transaction aligns with the Group’s Strategic Priorities, involving Enel’s repositioning in countries with a more integrated presence, including Italy, Spain, the United States, Brazil, Chile, and Colombia.

In May 2024, Enel announced that its subsidiary Enel Perú has sold all its equity stakes in Enel Generacion Perú and Compania Energética Veracruz to Niagara Energy. This sale was planned in the 2024-2026 Strategic Plan.

== Operations ==
Enel Green Power generates electricity from renewable sources. It operates in five continents with more than 1,400 operative plants. The production mix includes geothermal energy, hydropower, solar energy, and wind power. It manages 67 GW of total renewable capacity.

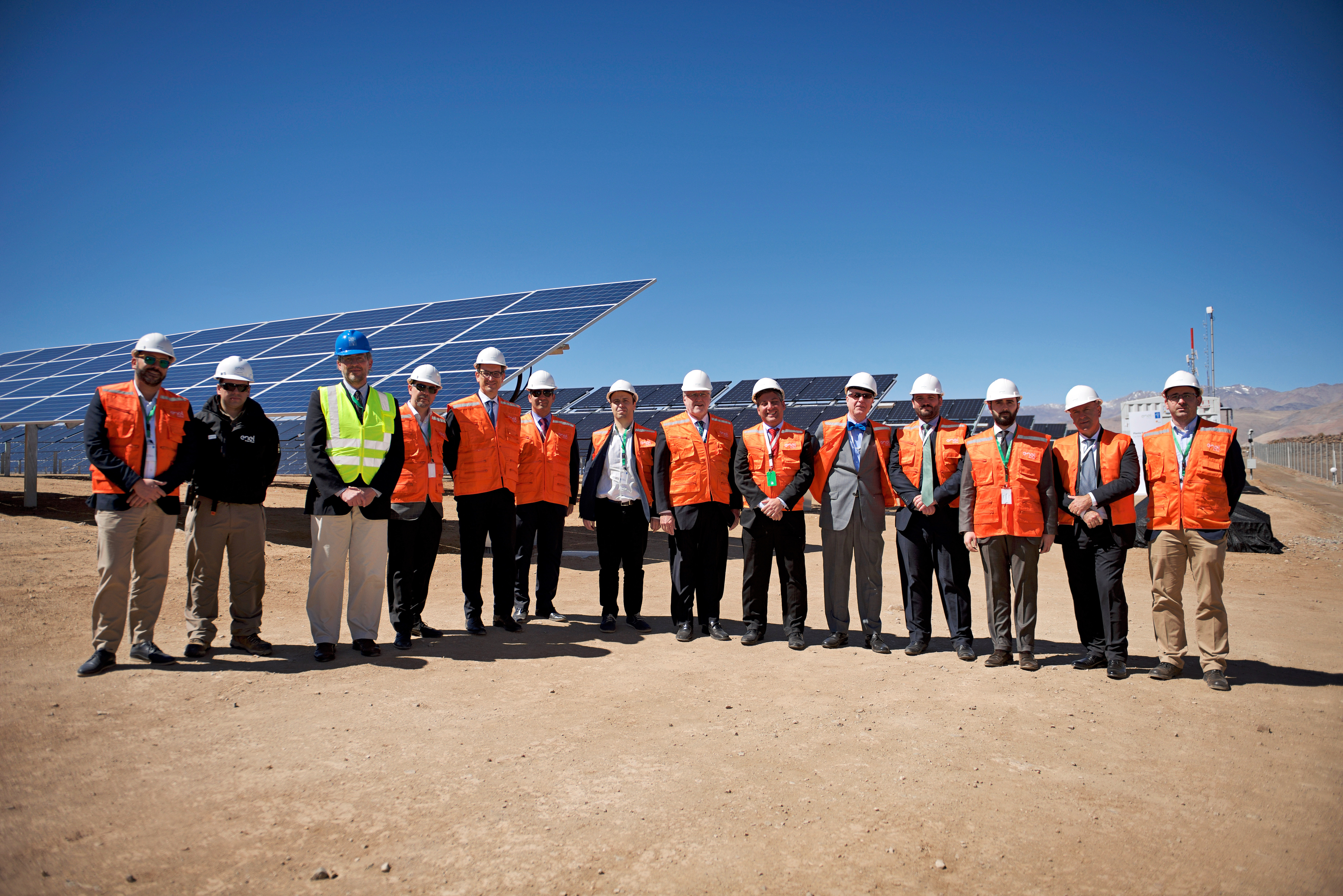
European Southern Observatory (ESO) and Enel Green Power officials at the entry into service of the La Silla Observatory photovoltaic power station in northern Chile.

Between 2020 and 2021, Enel Green Power initiated projects to develop green hydrogen, including an agreement with Eni to develop hydrogen production technology from renewable sources. In December 2020, Enel Green Power and Nextchem signed a memorandum of understanding to support the production of green hydrogen in the United States.

In 2023, Enel Green Power presented the construction site of 3Sun Gigafactory in Catania, Sicily. In January 2024, it secured a total of €560 million from the European Investment Bank, InvestEU, and other Italian banks like UniCredit, Banco BPM, and BPER Banca. The factory is intended to host five 600 MW module assembly lines and to have a full capacity utilization of 3 GW.

In line with the 2040 Vision, Enel Group presented the 2026-2028 Strategic Plan in February 2026, allocating approximately 20 billion euros to renewable energy, increasing capacity by around 15 GW. The technological mix includes over 75% onshore wind and dispatchable technologies, reaching more than 80 GW of total capacity by 2028.

Summary table of Enel electric generation capacity in GW as of 30 June 2026
Continent	Solar power	Wind power	Hydropower	Geothermal	Biomass	Storage	Total
Europe	3,69	4,45	18,35	0,78	0,06	1,82	29,14
America	10,66	12,72	8,62	0,08		1,67	33,77
Africa	0,36	2,08					2,44
Oceania	0,58	0,29				0,02	0,89
Asia	0,42	0,34					0,76
Total Enel Green Power	15,71	19,88	26,98	0,86	0,06	3,51	67

=== Solar-geothermal hybrid ===
Enel Green Power designed the Stillwater site, which is located in Fallon, Nevada (USA), and has received $40 million in tax relief under the American Recovery and Reinvestment Act.

In the first half of 2014 work began to integrate a solar thermal power plant to the structure.

In the second half of 2014, Enel Green Power partnered with the National Renewable Energy Laboratory (NREL) and the Idaho National Laboratory (INL), under the supervision of the US Department of Geothermal Technologies Office (GTO), via a cooperative research and development agreement, in order to use the data of the Stillwater plant to further develop the technology.

=== Solar thermal and concentrated solar power ===
The company also operates in the solar thermal and concentrated solar power (CSP), participating in research and development activities along with ENEA. Based on the studies of Nobel laureate Carlo Rubbia, in 2010 Enel Green Power built the Archimede combined cycle power plant in Priolo Gargallo in Sicily, with a total capacity of 5 MW. In the plant, parabolic mirrors focus the sun's heat on a fluid of molten salts that reaches temperatures of over 500 °C/932 °F and is able to retain heat for several hours, turning water into steam that then activates the traditional steam turbines system to produce electricity. The objective is to increase the efficiency.

== International presence ==
=== Europe ===
More than half of Enel Green Power's 1200 plants are located in Italy. The production mix includes hydropower, wind power, solar power, and geothermal power. One of the most considerable hydroelectricity plant installations is situated in Valmalenco at Campo Moro dams. It makes the Sondrio province Italy’s largest producer of hydroelectric energy due to its large production.

Enel Green Power has facilities in the Iberian Peninsula with 300 plants (hydropower, wind, and solar). This presence is the result of the integration of renewable energy activities of Enel and Endesa, as well as the construction and activation of new plants, including the Totana solar park (Fonte 2) and the Sierra Costera (Fonte 3) wind farm, which have been connected to the grid at the end of 2019.

Enel Green Power is present in Greece with 60 power plants. It manages the Kafireas wind farm (7 wind parks), which was connected to the grid at the end of 2019. In March 2024, Principia was established by its shareholders, Enel SpA and by a fund managed by Macquarie Asset Management, having previously begun operations in 2008 as part of Enel Green Power in Greece. Principia is a producer and developer of renewable energy projects in Greece. The business manages a diversified portfolio of wind, solar, hydropower and integrated battery storage technologies to help accelerate Greece’s transition to a cleaner and more sustainable future. As of March 2024, its portfolio consists of 59 plants under operation with a total installed capacity of 482MW, and an additional 7 solar parks under development with a total capacity of 95MW.

In December 2023, Enel completed the sale of 50% of Enel Green Power Hellas to Macquarie Asset Management. Following the agreement, the two companies have established a joint venture to co-manage Enel Green Power Hellas’ current renewable generation portfolio, while continuing to develop its projects. In April 2024, the joint venture was renamed to Principia Energy.

In March 2024, Enel Green Power Spain announced that it would construct a solar energy plant, the El Matorral photovoltaic plant, in the Canary Islands within the Barranco de Tirajana power plant. The plant is planned to begin operations in 2026 with a total capacity of 9.3 MW and costs of about €11.5 million. Also in March, the largest vanadium redox flow battery located in Europe was switched on at the Enel Green Power solar PV plant Son Orlandis in Mallorca. Enel Green Power began operations in June 2024 at a new photovoltaic plant with a capacity of 87 MW in Trino, Italy. In February 2025, through its subsidiary Endesa Generación, Enel completed the acquisition of Corporación Acciona Hidráulica, a company of the Acciona Group, comprising 34 hydroelectric plants located in northeastern Spain with a total installed capacity of 626 MW. In October 2025, the sale of a minority stake of 49.99% in Enel Green Power Espana to Masdar, based in Abu Dhabi, for €184 million was completed.

=== North America ===
Enel Green Power operates in North America with operational and under-construction facilities in the United States (solar and wind) and in Canada (wind).

On January 4, 2024, Enel Green Power announced the completion of the sale of a portfolio of approximately 150 MW to ORMAT Technologies Inc., which includes operational geothermal and solar facilities in the United States.

In February 2026, Enel Green Power North America acquired an 830MW portfolio of wind and solar operations from Excelsior Energy Capital. The $1 billion acquisition is intended to close in the third quarter of 2026 after approval from the Federal Energy Regulatory Commission.

=== Latin America ===
In Latin America, Enel Green Power has operations in Mexico, Panama, Guatemala, Costa Rica, Argentina, Brazil, Chile and Colombia, where it is present with all the main renewable production technologies, including wind, solar, hydroelectric and geothermal.

Enel Green Power began operations at a €456 million wind complex located in Morro do Chapéu, Ourolândia and Umburanas in April 2024. The complex has 81 turbines and a total capacity of 348 MW. In August 2024, a Enel Green Power wind complex with 43 turbines began operations in Ourolândia and Umburanas. The complex costs amounted to €297 million and it is capable of generating 894 GWh per year.

=== Africa ===
Enel Green Power is present in Africa with plants in operation and under construction in South Africa (solar and wind technology), Morocco (wind technology) and Zambia (solar technology).

In South Africa, the construction of the Impofu Wind Power Farms Complex with 57 onshore wind turbines began in March 2024. The farms are to be operational by 2026 and will have a total capacity of 330 MW.

=== Asia ===
In 2015 Enel Green Power acquired a majority stake in Indian renewable energy company BLP Energy – for 30 million euros. In Asia, Enel Green generates energy from wind and solar sources. It currently holds 100% of BLP Energy.

In India, Enel Green Power has established offices in Gurgaon and Bangalore and manages three wind farms.

The company has also won two tenders for the “Tunga” Wind Project in Karnataka and for the “Thar” Solar Photovoltaic Project in Rajasthan.

Since 2021, Enel Green Power has expanded its presence to Vietnam with several renewable energy projects. The first plant is set to begin operations in 2024.

In January 2025, Enel Green Power India was acquired by Waaree Energies for about $92 million and at the time of the acquisition it was operating at a net capacity of 760MWDC.

By August 2025, Waaree was uncertain of continuing the acquisition due to no completion of terms.

=== Oceania ===
Since 2017, Enel Green Power has operated in Oceania with 4 solar parks located in South Australia and Victoria, with a capacity of 310 MW, along with a 75 MW wind farm in Western Australia. Additionally, a 93 MW solar park is under commissioning in Victoria. In September 2023, 50% of Enel Green Power Australia was sold to INPEX, resulting in a jointly managed ownership structure.

In January 2024, Enel Green Power Australia signed a deal with QEM for the purchase of a 1GW wind and solar project. The deal also included solar and wind monitoring equipment as well as 18 months of floodplain, environmental, engineering and geotechnical data and research.

In December 2024, Potentia Energy was established as a new entity co-owned by Enel Green Power and INPEX for the development of renewable energy projects. The new company has over 7 GW of projects included in its development pipeline, focusing on wind, solar, energy storage systems, and hybrid projects.

== Incidents and lawsuits ==
=== Turbine failure ===
On 3 February 2015, a turbine at the hydropower plant at Barber Dam, Boise, Idaho, turned off. A regional operations manager for Enel said it was not clear what caused the shut down, and that an alert system also failed. Boise River water normally flows through at 240 cubic feet per second (6.8 m^{3}/s), but that night it dipped to less than 60 cubic feet per second (1.7 m^{3}/s). The low water level stretched 10 to 15 miles (16 to 24 km) downstream, and brought the Boise River to its driest point in decades. Idaho Fish and Game said they did find some dead fish, and although they believed adult fish weren't impacted, younger ones could have been.

=== 2024 Lake Suviana explosion ===
On 9 April 2024, at around 15:00 CEST, an explosion occurred at the Bargi power plant in Lake Suviana, an artificial lake in the Apennine Mountains near Bologna. The explosion occurred 30 metres (98 ft) below the lake's surface, reportedly when a fire caused a turbine to explode on the eighth floor, flooding the floor below and collapsing two levels. The fire began during maintenance work, according to the mayor of the nearby town of Camugnano. Italian authorities said that it was impossible to determine the cause of the explosion. Seven people were killed, and five people suffered severe burns and were airlifted via helicopter to a nearby hospital, including two whom were taken to an intensive care unit. Enel Green Power said that no damage was caused to the dam which formed the lake.

=== Lawsuits ===
On 11 November 2014, the United States Attorney for the Northern District of Oklahoma filed suit against Enel's subsidiary Osage Wind LLC, an 84-turbine industrial wind project in Osage County, Okla. In the suit, the United States alleges that Enel and Osage Wind are illegally converting minerals owned by the Osage Nation, a Native American tribe that has owned all mineral rights in the county since 1871. Osage Wind has insisted that it is not mining and needs no permit. The company says that it has already spent nearly $300 million on the project, which is being built on privately owned fee land, not land held in trust for American Indians. In 2015, the 10th U.S. Circuit Court of Appeals rules that construction of the turbines deprived the tribe of its property rights. In 2019, The U.S. Supreme Court declined to consider an appeal of this decision.

Osage Wind LLC and a second and adjacent Enel wind project, Mustang Run, were also embroiled in cases before the Oklahoma Supreme Court in which the Osage Nation and Osage County, Oklahoma, challenged the constitutional legitimacy of permits for both projects. In 2016, Court found in Osage Wind LLC's favor.

In December 2023, a federal court ruled that Enel subsidiaries Osage Wind, Enel Kansas, and EGPNA must remove the wind turbines installed at the Osage Wind project in northern Oklahoma for failing to obtain proper mineral rights from the Osage Nation. Following a removal order issued in December 2024, Enel appealed the decision to the U.S. Court of Appeals for the Tenth Circuit. In March 2025, the court granted a temporary stay of enforcement on the removal order pending the resolution of the appeal.
