= 3Sun =

Energy company in Italy

- Industry: Energy
- Founded: January 4, 2010
- Headquarters: Catania, Italy
- Products: Photovoltaic panels
- Number of employees: 220 (2022)
- Website: 3sun.com

3Sun is a photovoltaic panel factory established in 2010 in Catania, Sicily, Italy. In 2015, Enel Green Power became the company's sole shareholder. 3Sun was established as a joint venture by Enel Green Power, Sharp Corporation, and STMicroelectronics, each owning 33% of 3Sun.

== History ==
Between 2011 and 2014, 3Sun built a photovoltaic cell and module plant in Catania that employed thin-layer technology. Sharp contributes the amorphous silicon multi-junction thin-film technology, Enel Green Power manages the commercial distribution, and STMicroelectronics provides personnel specialized in processes and research and development. On March 6, 2015, Enel Green Power became the sole owner of 3Sun.

In August 2018, the manufacturing of Heterojunction Technology (HJT) bifacial panels began, making 3Sun the world's most automated plant in the sector, with the ability to operate continuously. The first HJT cells were produced in February 2019 and mass production began in August 2019.

In April 2022, Enel Green Power signed a grant agreement with the European Commission for subsidized financing, as part of the EU's first Innovation Fund call for large-scale projects, contributing to the development of the TANGO (iTaliAN pv Giga factOry) project. This involves the construction of an industrial-scale production facility for the manufacturing of innovative, sustainable and high-performance photovoltaic (PV) modules at the 3Sun solar panel factory in Catania.

== Gallery ==
Aerial view

Production line

Heterojunction photovoltaic modules

== See also ==
- Renewable energy in the European Union
- Energy policy of the European Union
- Energy in Italy
