= Wesley, South Africa =

Wesley
- Location within Eastern Cape Location within South Africa
- Coordinates: 33.321°S 27.345°E
- Country: South Africa
- Province: Eastern Cape
- District: Amathole
- Municipality: Ngqushwa

Area
  - Total: 2.21 km^{2} (0.85 sq mi)

Population (2011)
  - Total: 1,634
  - Density: 739/km^{2} (1,910/sq mi)

Racial makeup (2011)
  - Black African: 99.9%
  - Coloured: 0.1%

First languages (2011)
  - Xhosa: 97.6%
  - Other: 2.4%
- Time zone: UTC+2 (SAST)
- PO box: 5612
- Area code: 040

Wesley is a town in Amathole District Municipality in the Eastern Cape province of South Africa.

Village on the Twecu, a tributary of the Chalumna River, 69 km south of King William's Town. Founded by William Shaw of the Wesleyan Missionary Society in 1823, it was probably named after the founder of the Wesleyan Methodist Church, John Wesley.
