= Monte Cevedale =

Mountain in Italy

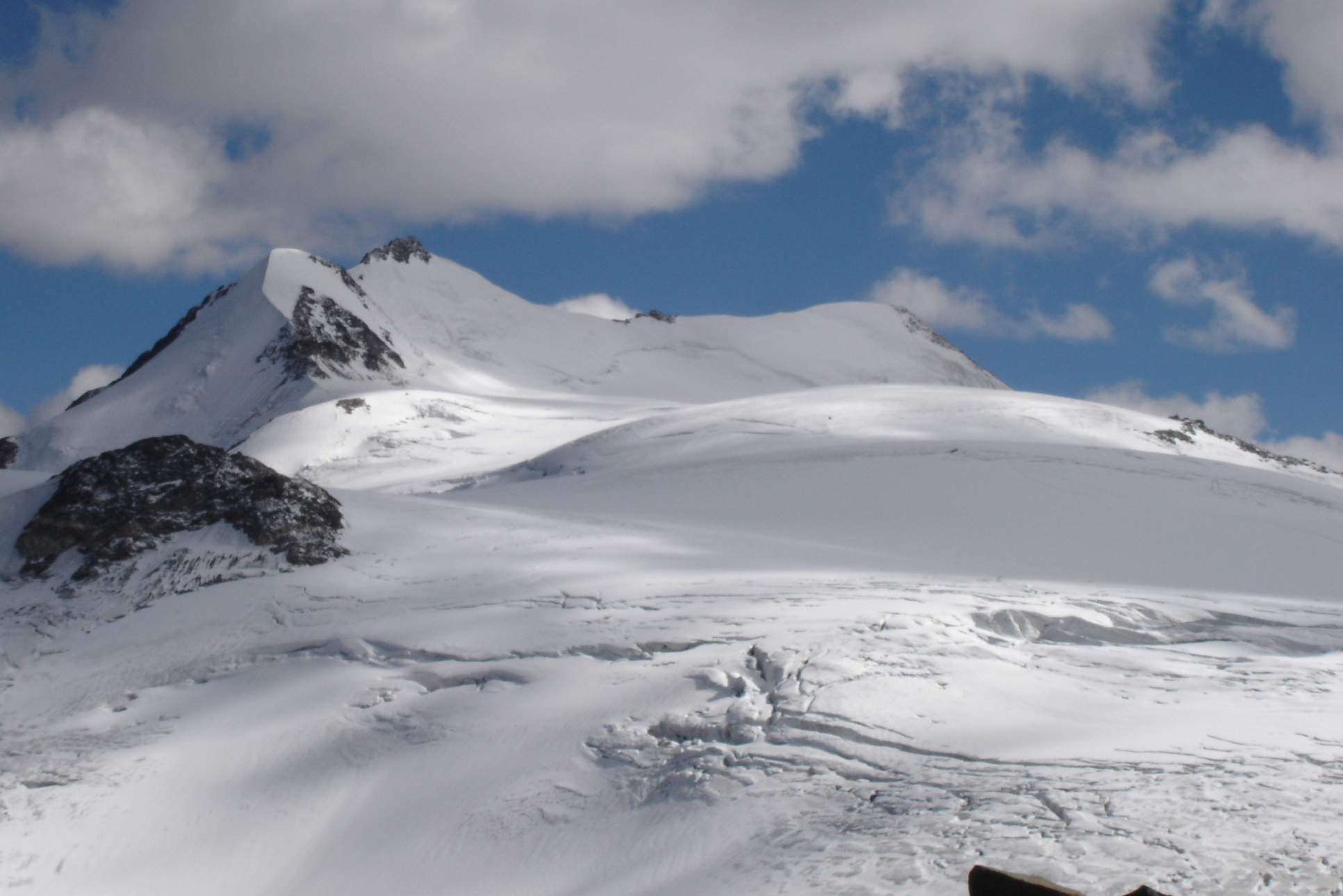
- The Zufallspitzen / Cima Cevedale (3700 & 3757m, left) and Monte Cevedale (3769m, right) as seen from the west from Rifugio Casati.

Highest point
- Elevation: 3,769 m (12,365 ft)
- Listing: Alpine mountains above 3000 m
- Coordinates: 46°26′53″N 10°37′15″E

Geography
- Location within Alps
- Location: Lombardy and Trentino, Italy

Monte Cevedale is a mountain at the border of the Lombardy and Trentino-Alto Adige/Südtirol regions in Italy. The southern summit (3769 m) is the highest mountain of Trentino province, while three provinces, Sondrio, South Tyrol, and Trentino meet on the northern summit (3757 m), known as Cima Cevedale or Zufallspitze.
