= Balance of plant =

Power engineering term

Balance of plant (BOP) is a term generally used in the context of power engineering to refer to all the supporting components and auxiliary systems of a power plant needed to deliver the energy, other than the generating unit itself. These may include transformers, inverters, switching and control equipment, protection equipment, power conditioners, supporting structures etc., depending on the type of plant.

== See also ==
- Balance of system
