= Ourolândia =

Municipality of Bahia, Brazil

Coordinates: 10°58′12″S 41°04′58″W

- Municipality
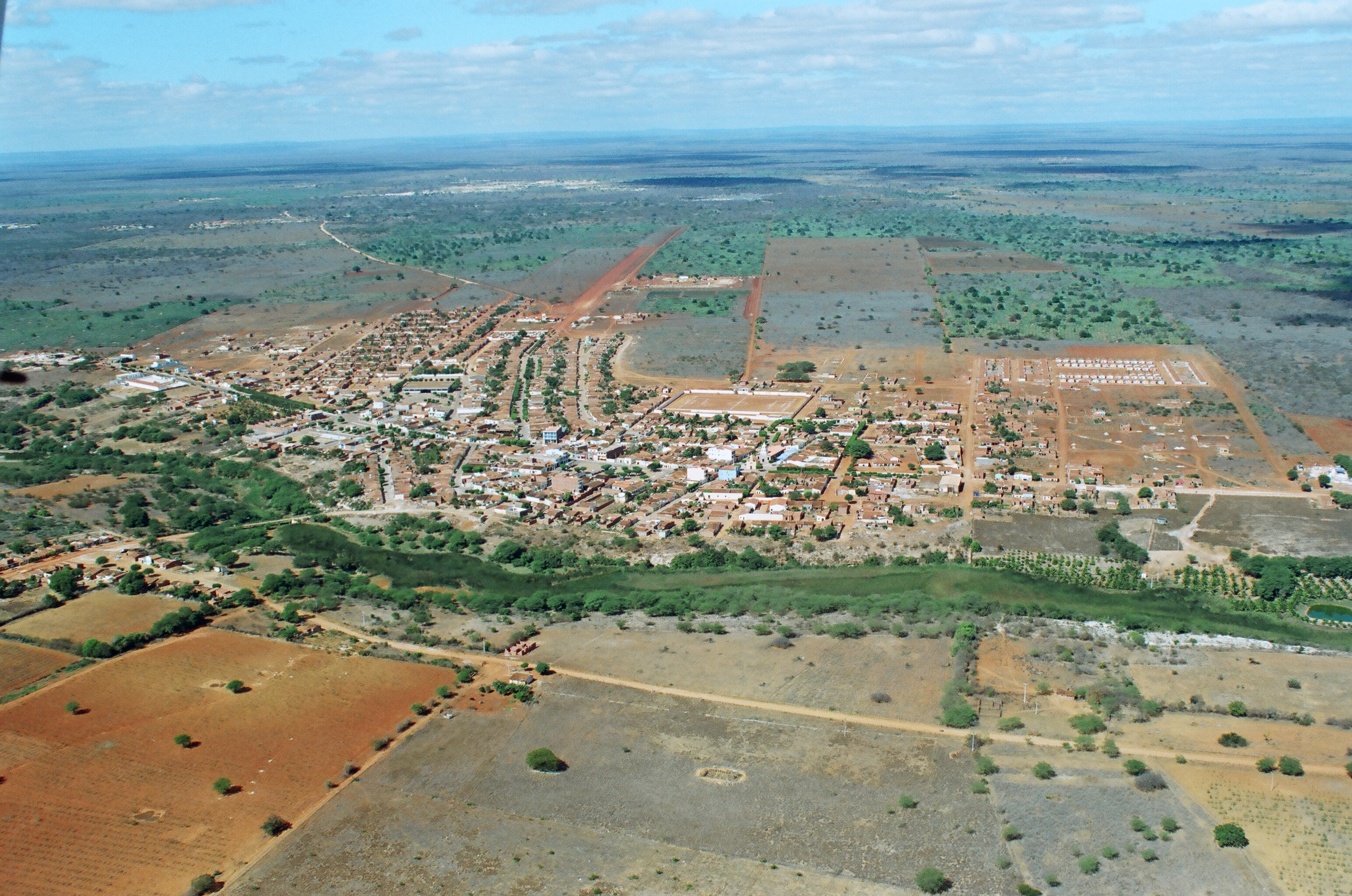

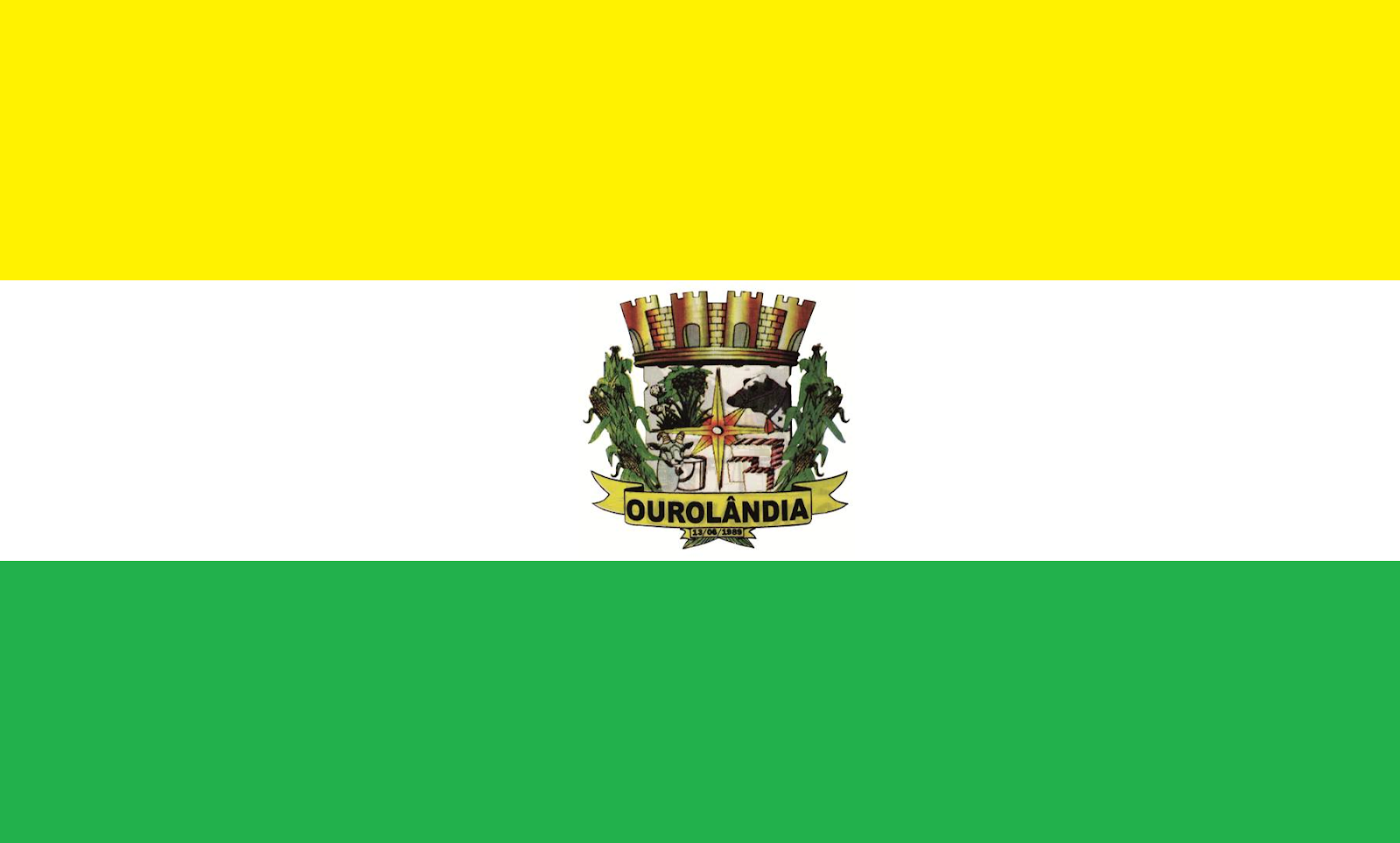
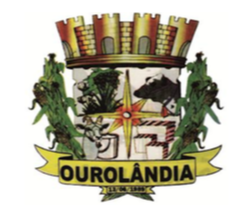
- Flag Coat of arms
- Interactive map of Ourolândia
- Country: Brazil
- Region: Nordeste
- State: Bahia

Population (2020)
  - Total: 17,511
- Time zone: UTC−3 (BRT)

Ourolândia is a municipality in the state of Bahia in the North-East region of Brazil.

== See also ==
- List of municipalities in Bahia
