= Kangnas Wind Power Station =

Wind farm in South Africa

- Country: South Africa
- Location: Nama Khoi; Namakwa District; Northern Cape Province
- Coordinates: 29°29′02″S 18°26′05″E
- Status: Operational
- Construction began: 2018
- Commission date: November 2020
- Owner: Infinity Power
- Operator: Mainstream Renewable Power

Wind farm
- Type: Onshore

Power generation
- Units operational: 61
- Make and model: Siemens Gamesa Renewable Energy
- Nameplate capacity: 140 MW
- Annual net output: 513 GWh

External links
- Website: Homepage
- Main Sub-Contractors: Siemens Gamesa Renewable Energy (Turbines), Concor & Conco (Construction)

The Kangnas Wind Power Station is an operational 140 MW (190,000 hp) wind power plant in South Africa. The power station was developed and is owned by a consortium of international IPPs and financiers. Commercial operations started in November 2020. The energy generated at this wind farm is sold to the South African national electricity utility company Eskom, under a 20-year power purchase agreement (PPA).

== Location ==
The power station is located in Nama Khoi, in Namakwa District, in Northern Cape Province, approximately 52 kilometres (32 mi) east of the town of Springbok, the administrative capital of both Nama Khoi and Namakwa District. Springbok is located about 775 kilometres (482 mi), by road, west of Kimberley, the capital city of Northern Cape Province.

== Overview ==
The power station was built, funded and is operated by a consortium referred to as the Lekela Power Consortium, as part of the South African government's Renewable Energy Independent Power Producer Procurement Program (REIPPP). This wind farm, together with four other operational wind power stations in South Africa, comprise a source of 600 megawatts of clean renewable energy owned and operated by the Lekela Consortium.

The power station is made of 61 wind turbines of the Siemens SWT-2.3-108 variety, each rated at 2.3 megawatts for total capacity of 140.3 MW. Each turbine consists of three rotors, reach measuring 108 metres (354 ft), mounted on a metal pole measuring 115 metres (377 ft), in height.

All the turbines are connected centrally to an onsite electric substation, by an array of medium voltage wires. At the onsite substation, the energy is stepped up to "high voltage" and evacuated to enter the Eskom national grid. In addition to the electric infrastructure, a network of roads has been developed within the wind farm. Also, a series of "crane hardstands" have been constructed to facilitate future maintenance of the wind turbines and related equipment.

== Developers ==
The table below illustrates the ownership of Lekela Power Consortium.

Ownership of Red Sea Power Limited SAS
Rank	Shareholder	Domicile	Notes
1	Lekela Power	United Kingdom	
2	Mainstream Renewable Power	Sweden	
3	African Rainbow Energy and Power	South Africa	
4	Kangnas Renewable Energy Community Trust	South Africa	
5	Old Mutual Life Assurance Company	South Africa	
6	HI Holdings	Cyprus	

== Construction and timeframe ==
The Spanish-German conglomerate, Siemens Gamesa Renewable Energy S.A., handled the engineering, procurement and construction contract for this wind farm. Construction began in 2018 and concluded in late 2020.

== Other considerations ==
It is calculated that the wind farm adds 513.2GWh to the South African national grid every year. This power is sufficient to supply an estimated 154,625 South African homes. At the peak of construction an estimated 550 people were employed at the site. The Kangnas Renewable Energy Community Trust, was established at financial close, and was gifted 15 percent shareholding in the power station.

== See also ==
- List of power stations in South Africa
- Wesley–Ciskei Wind Power Station
- Oyster Bay Wind Power Station
- Garob Wind Power Station
