= Wesley–Ciskei Wind Power Station =

Wind farm in South Africa

- Country: South Africa
- Location: Wesley, Amathole District, Eastern Cape, South Africa
- Coordinates: 33°18′09″S 27°22′14″E
- Status: Under construction
- Commission date: August 2021
- Owner: EDF Renewables

Wind farm
- Type: Onshore

Power generation
- Units operational: 10
- Nameplate capacity: 34.5 MW

The Wesley–Ciskei Wind Power Station is a 34.5 megawatts wind power energy project in South Africa. The power station is owned by EDF Renewables, a subsidiary of the French energy conglomerate Électricité de France (EDF). EDF won the concession for this project in June 2015, during the 4th round of the South African government's Renewable Energy Independent Power Producer Procurement Programme of South Africa (REIPPP).

== Location ==
The wind farm is located outside the settlement of Wesley, in Amathole District, in the Eastern Cape Province of South Africa. Wesley is located approximately 77 kilometres (48 mi) southwest of East London, where the district headquarters are located. This is approximately 207 kilometres (129 mi) northeast of the city of Gqeberha. The geographical coordinates of Wesley-Ciskei Wind Farm are 33°18'09.0"S, 27°22'14.0"E (Latitude:-33.302500; Longitude:27.370556).

== Overview ==
South Africa's Renewable Energy Supply Programme (REIPPP), is a public-procurement program of the South African government conceived in the 2000s and implemented in the 2010s and thereafter. It aims at attracting independent power producers (IPPs) to invest in renewable power generation in the country. As of April 2019, four rounds of bidding have resulted in the award of 102 power projects, with more expected in future. The target is 7,000 megawatts in renewable generation in the short term and 17,800 in the medium term.

EDF won the bid to design, fund, build and operate this wind farm. The energy generated will be sold to Eskom, the South African electric utility company under a 20-year power purchase agreement. EDF assigned its subsidiary EDF Renewables RSA to carry out the development. The farm comprises ten turbines of the Vestas V126-3.45 variety, capable of generating 3.45 megawatts each.

== Construction and timeline ==
The engineering, procurement and construction (EPC) contract was awarded to Vestas, the international manufacturer of wind turbines headquartered in Denmark, with manufacturing plants in nearly 20 countries. Vestas supplied the equipment, installed the equipment on site, installed the "VestasOnline Business SCADA" system, which allows remote monitoring and some adjustment of each individual turbine.

Construction began in September 2019 and commercial commissioning was expected in September 2021.

The wind farm's operator EDF Renewables reported in August 2021 that the facility had been connected to the grid, commercial operations began later the same month.

== See also ==
- List of power stations in South Africa
- Oyster Bay Wind Power Station
- Kangnas Wind Power Station
