= Morro do Chapéu =

Municipality of Bahia State, Brazil

- Municipality of Bahia, Brazil
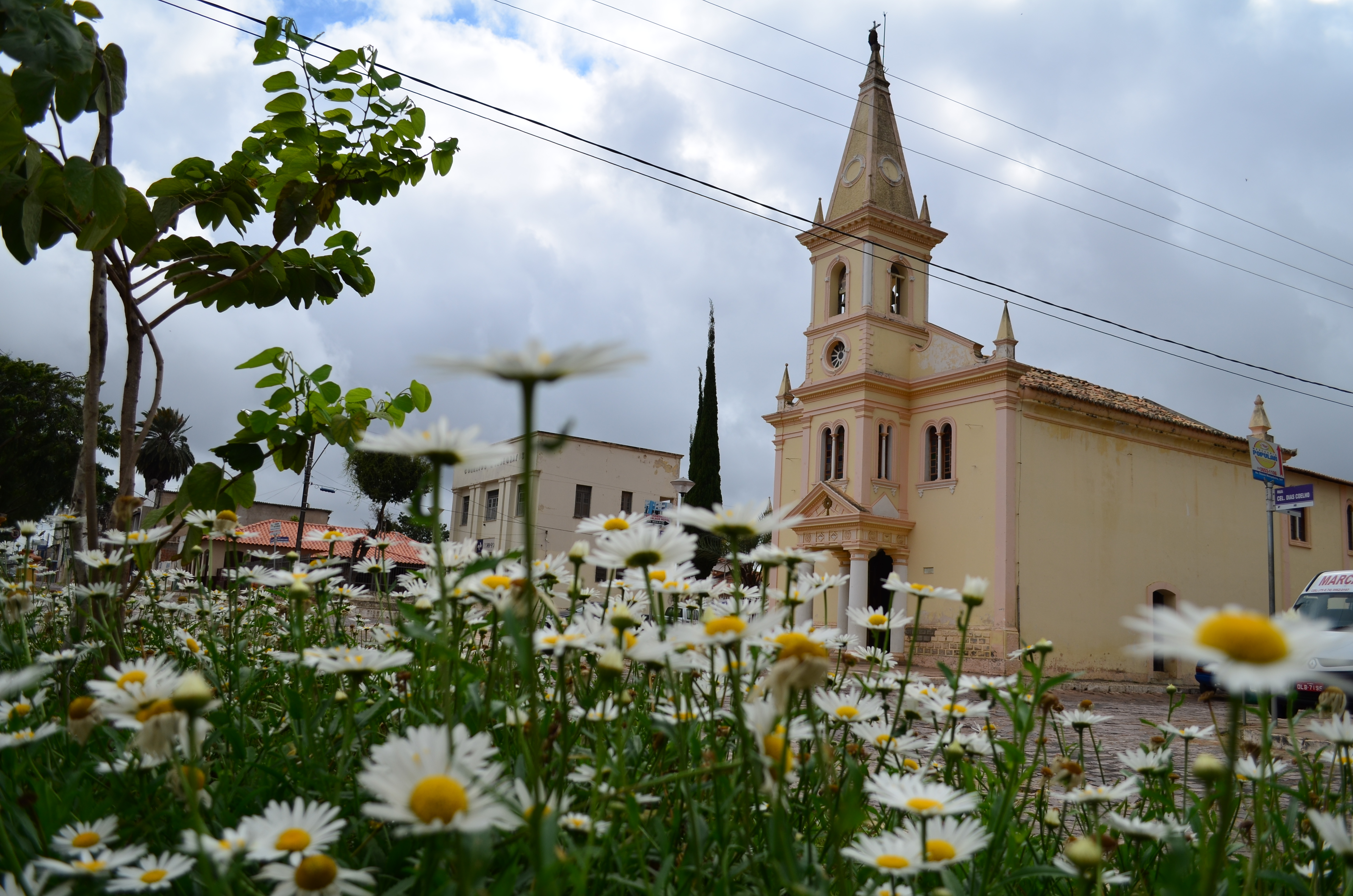
- Nossa Senhora da Graça church

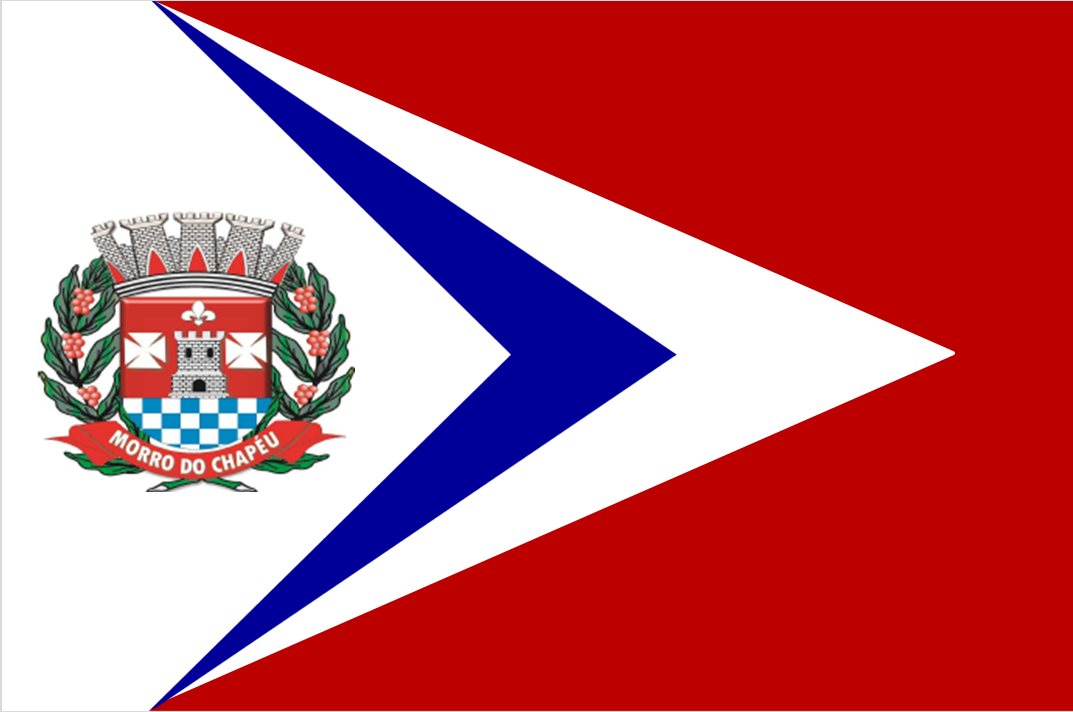
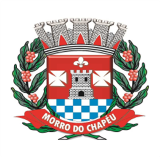
- Flag Coat of arms

- Location of Morro do Chapéu in Bahia

- Location within Brazil Location within South America
- Coordinates: 11°33′00″S 41°09′21″W
- Country: Brazil
- Region: Northeast
- State: Bahia
- Founded: 8 August 1909

Government
  - Mayor: Juliana Pereira Araujo Leal (PDT) (2025-2028)
  - Vice Mayor: Vitor Araujo Azevedo (UNIÃO) (2025-2028)

Area
  - Total: 5,744.969 km^{2} (2,218.145 sq mi)
- Elevation: 1,011 m (3,317 ft)

Population (2022)
  - Total: 33,594
  - Density: 5.85/km^{2} (15.2/sq mi)
- Demonym: Morrense (Brazilian Portuguese)
- Time zone: UTC-03:00 (Brasília Time)
- Postal code: 44850-000, 44852-000, 44860-000, 44862-000, 44865-000, 44875-000, 44855-000
- HDI (2010): 0.588 – medium
- Website: morrodochapeu.ba.gov.br

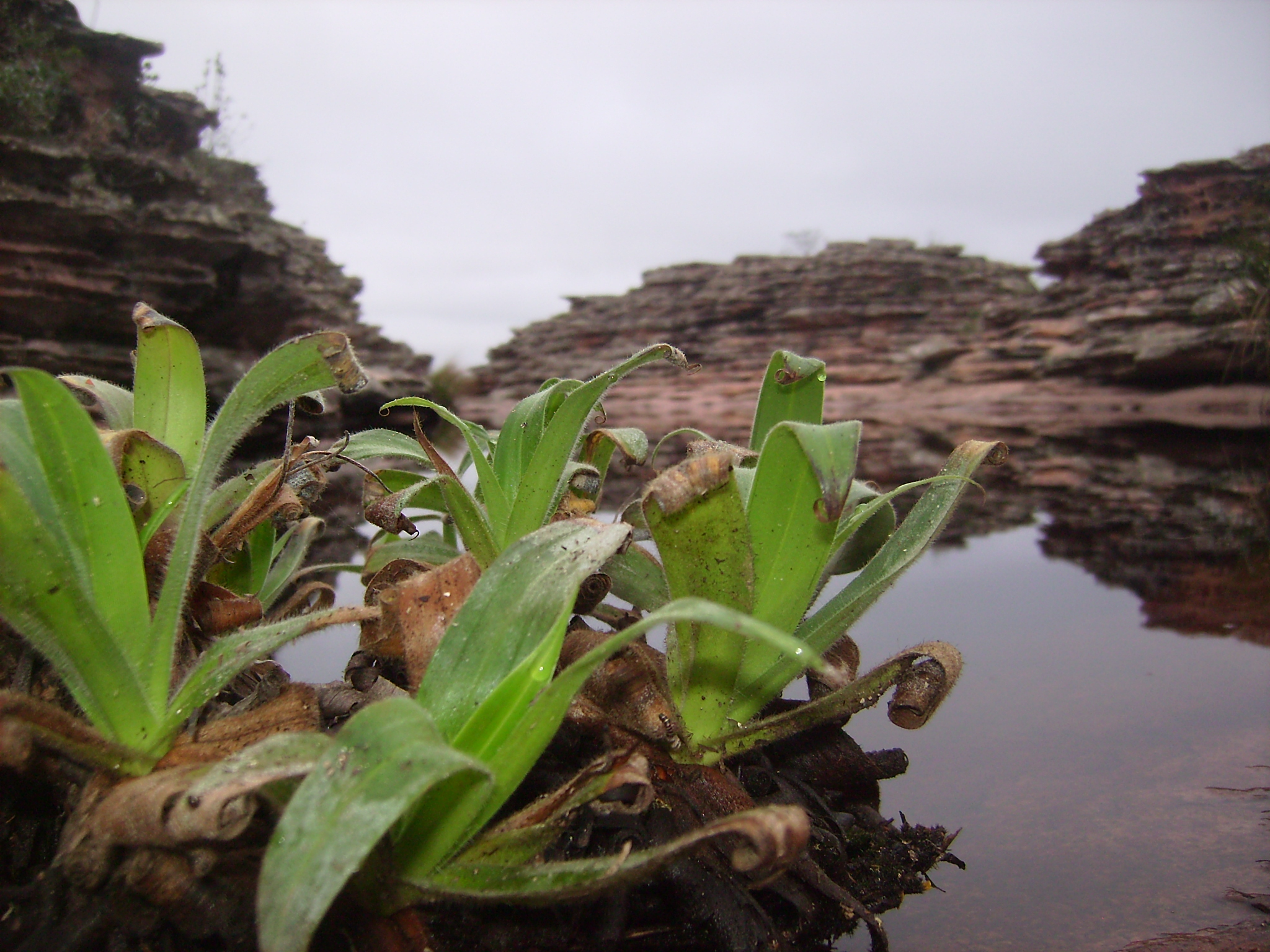

Morro do Chapéu is a municipality in the Brazilian state of Bahia, 386 km northwest of its capital, Salvador, 1012 meters above the sea level, because of which it is one of the coolest towns in Bahia, with temperatures occasionally falling below 10 °C in the winter. Its estimated population in 2020 is 35,440.

== Overview ==
The municipality contains the 46,000 hectares (110,000 acres) Morro do Chapéu State Park, created in 1998. Standing at Chapada Diamantina region, its main attractions are Ferro Doido waterfall and Brejões cave, both among the most beautiful natural monuments in Bahia, but are almost unexplored by tourists given to the city's lack of infrastructure. There are several other waterfalls and caves around the town.

== Climate ==
Morro do Chapéu has a tropical savanna climate with warm summers and mild to warm, dry winters.

Climate data for Morro do Chapéu (1991–2020)
Month	Jan	Feb	Mar	Apr	May	Jun	Jul	Aug	Sep	Oct	Nov	Dec	Year
Mean daily maximum °C (°F)	28.1 (82.6)	28.3 (82.9)	28.1 (82.6)	26.7 (80.1)	25.0 (77.0)	23.4 (74.1)	22.9 (73.2)	23.8 (74.8)	25.9 (78.6)	27.8 (82.0)	27.6 (81.7)	27.9 (82.2)	26.3 (79.3)
Daily mean °C (°F)	22.3 (72.1)	22.5 (72.5)	22.5 (72.5)	21.6 (70.9)	20.2 (68.4)	18.7 (65.7)	18.0 (64.4)	18.3 (64.9)	19.7 (67.5)	21.4 (70.5)	21.8 (71.2)	22.2 (72.0)	20.8 (69.4)
Mean daily minimum °C (°F)	18.2 (64.8)	18.4 (65.1)	18.6 (65.5)	18.2 (64.8)	17.1 (62.8)	15.8 (60.4)	14.9 (58.8)	14.8 (58.6)	15.7 (60.3)	17.0 (62.6)	17.7 (63.9)	18.0 (64.4)	17.0 (62.6)
Average precipitation mm (inches)	82.1 (3.23)	71.2 (2.80)	80.7 (3.18)	57.9 (2.28)	28.2 (1.11)	34.8 (1.37)	29.9 (1.18)	24.6 (0.97)	18.0 (0.71)	33.8 (1.33)	93.1 (3.67)	71.4 (2.81)	625.7 (24.63)
Average precipitation days (≥ 1.0 mm)	6.1	5.6	6.2	7.2	7.8	9.4	8.6	6.8	4.9	3.5	6.5	5.9	78.5
Average relative humidity (%)	69.5	70.4	72.3	77.2	80.2	82.5	80.8	75.7	70.6	65.8	69.2	69.6	73.7
Average dew point °C (°F)	17.1 (62.8)	17.4 (63.3)	17.7 (63.9)	17.8 (64.0)	17.0 (62.6)	16.0 (60.8)	14.9 (58.8)	14.5 (58.1)	14.8 (58.6)	15.5 (59.9)	16.5 (61.7)	17.0 (62.6)	16.4 (61.5)
Mean monthly sunshine hours	225.7	201.4	217.3	193.0	173.8	162.3	186.3	215.7	215.9	230.6	193.2	213.2	2,428.4
Source: NOAA

== See also ==
- List of municipalities in Bahia
