= Garob Wind Power Station =

Wind farm in South Africa

- Country: South Africa
- Location: Copperton, Siyathemba Local Municipality, Karoo Region; Northern Cape Province
- Coordinates: 29°57′43″S 22°24′44″E
- Status: Operational
- Construction began: April 2019
- Commission date: December 2022
- Construction cost: €200+ million (US$225.7 million)
- Owner: Enel SpA
- Operator: Nordex

Wind farm
- Type: Onshore

Power generation
- Units operational: 46
- Make and model: Nordex
- Nameplate capacity: 145 MW
- Annual net output: 573 GWh

External links
- Website: Homepage

The Garob Wind Power Station is an operational 145 MW (194,000 hp) wind power plant in South Africa. The power station was developed and is owned by Enel, the Italian manufacturer and distributor of electricity and gas infrastructure, through its subsidiary Enel Green Power of South Africa (EGPRSA). Construction of this wind farm started in April 2019 and achieved commercial operation in December 2021. The energy generated at this wind farm is sold to the South African national electricity utility company Eskom, under a 20-year power purchase agreement (PPA).

== Location ==
The power station is located near the former mining town of Copperton, in Siyathemba Local Municipality, in the Karoo Region, in Northern Cape Province. This is approximately 233 kilometres (145 mi), by road, northwest of De Aar, the district headquarters of Pixley ka Seme District Municipality, where the power station is located. Copperton is located about 288 kilometres (179 mi), by road, southwest of Kimberley, the capital city of Northern Cape Province.

== Overview ==
The concession for this wind farm was awarded to Enel in 2015, as part of the fourth round of the Renewable Energy Independent Power Producer Procurement Programme (REIPPPP), of the Republic of South Africa. Enel signed a 20-year power purchase agreement with Eskom.

During construction, the pylons that support the wind turbines were manufactured on-site, out of concrete and cement, instead of metal as is the usual method. This provided business for local suppliers and contractors. Nordex, the European supplier of the wind turbines, operates and maintains the power station on behalf of the owners.

== Funding ==
Funding for this renewable energy infrastructure was sourced from two South African financial houses, namely Absa Group and Nedbank. The total cost of construction is reported to be in excess of €200 million (approx. US$225.7 million).

== Other considerations ==
It is calculated that the wind farm adds 573GWh to the South African national grid every year. This power station saves the country the emission of 600,000 tons of CO_{2} annually. At the peak of construction an estimated 511 people were employed at the site. This is the 10th renewable power station developed by Enel, under the South African REIPPP program. The list of those power stations, with installed capacity exceeding 800 megawatts, is listed in references 1 and 2 below.

== See also ==
- List of power stations in South Africa
- Wesley–Ciskei Wind Power Station
- Oyster Bay Wind Power Station
- Kangnas Wind Power Station
