= Oyster Bay Wind Power Station =

Wind farm in South Africa

- Country: South Africa
- Location: Oyster Bay, Kouga; Sarah Baartman District; Eastern Cape Province
- Coordinates: 34°06′40″S 24°37′47″E
- Status: Operational
- Construction began: May 2019
- Commission date: July 2021
- Construction cost: €180 million (US$212 million)
- Owner: Enel Green Power
- Operator: Enel Green Power

Wind farm
- Type: Onshore

Power generation
- Units operational: 41
- Make and model: Vestas
- Nameplate capacity: 140 MW
- Annual net output: 568 GWh

The Oyster Bay Wind Power Station is an operational 140 MW (190,000 hp) wind power plant in South Africa. The power station was developed and is owned by Enel Green Power, a subsidiary of the Italian energy conglomerate, Enel, headquartered in Rome. The energy generated at this wind farm is sold to the South African national electricity utility company Eskom, under a 20-year power purchase agreement (PPA).

== Location ==
The power station is located in Oyster Bay, in Kouga Municipality, Sarah Baartman District, in the Eastern Cape Province of South Africa.

Oyster Bay Wind Farm is located approximately 110 kilometres (68 mi), by road, west of Gqeberha, the nearest large city. This is about 661 kilometres (411 mi), by road, east of Cape Town, the second largest city in South Africa. The geographical coordinates of the power station are 34°06'40.0"S, 24°37'47.0"E (Latitude:-34.111111; Longitude:24.629722).

== Overview ==
The power station has a maximum generation capacity of 140 megawatts. The power station was built, funded and is operated by the South African unit of Enel Green Power, referred to as Enel Green Power RSA (EGP-RSA). This power station is one of nine wind and solar installations in South Arica, that Enel Green Power RSA has in operation in the country, as part of the South African government's Renewable Energy Independent Power Producer Procurement Program (REIPPP). Together, the nine renewable energy installations installed and managed by (EGP-RSA), add in excess of 800 megawatts of the South Arica national grid, as of July 2021.

== Construction costs ==
Enel, Enel Green Power and EGP-RSA spent approximately €180 million (US$212 million) to develop and build this power station.

== Other considerations ==
It is expected that the wind farm will add 568GWh to the South African national grid every year. This will aid the country in avoiding the emission of 590,000 tons of carbon dioxide annually.

== See also ==
- List of power stations in South Africa
- Wesley–Ciskei Wind Power Station
- Kangnas Wind Power Station
