= List of social movements in South Africa =

There are several high-profile independent social movements in South Africa. The majority have a particular focus on the housing crisis in the urban areas but others range from focusing on HIV/AIDS, working conditions, unemployment, access to service delivery and issues of democracy, transparency and accountability, corruption, poverty, crime, xenophobia, economy, drought, racism, sexism, health conditions etc...

This is a partial list of social movements in South Africa:

- Abahlali baseMjondolo, the shackdwellers movement based in KwaZulu-Natal and the Western Cape
- Equal Education based in the Western Cape and Gauteng
- InkuluFreeHeid, based in Gauteng with chapters elsewhere in the country.
- The Landless People's Movement, based in Gauteng
- The Mandela Park Backyarders based in the Western Cape
- The Poor People's Alliance, a national alliance of grassroots movements
- SANARA, the South African National Resistance Army, a 'defend democracy' organization
- Reclaim The City, a social movement fighting for land and housing in Cape Town's inner-city and wealthy suburbs
- Sikhula Sonke women's farmworkers union based in the Western Cape
- The Social Justice Coalition based in the Western Cape
- The South African Unemployed Peoples' Movement is based in Durban, KZN, and in Grahamstown in the Eastern Cape
- The Treatment Action Campaign, based in the Western Cape but with branches elsewhere in the country
- The Western Cape Anti-Eviction Campaign, based in the Western Cape
