= Pau D'Arco massacre =

2017 killing of landless activists by police in Brazil

The Pau D'Arco Massacre was the police killing of 10 landless activists associated with the Brazilian Landless Workers' Movement, on the Santa Lúcia farm in Pau d'Arco, Pará. The massacre occurred on May 24, 2017, and was ostensibly carried out as the enforcement of an eviction order.

== Confrontation ==
State officials initially reported the killings as having been performed in self-defense, while eyewitnesses and survivors claimed that the victims of the massacre had neither attacked nor received warning from the police.

In an independent investigation, the magazine piauí found that the injuries inflicted on the victims were more consistent with what would be expected from one-sided executions, than what would be expected from a firefight. Specifically, more than half of the victims had been shot multiple times, shot in the back, or shot with precision at close range. Additionally, there were no traces of gunpowder found on any of the victims' hands, prompting the local prosecutor to conclude that none of them had fired a gun over the course of the confrontation.

Under questioning, two of the policemen present for the massacre confirmed that they had effectively performed it as an extrajudicial mass execution. At a press conference, the highest ranking law-enforcement official in the region stated, "There are strong indications this was an execution".

== Legality of the eviction order ==
At the time of the killing, the activists alleged that the ownership deeds of the land they occupied had been forged, which would have meant that it was public land. If this was true, the Brazilian constitution would have required for ownership of the land to be transferred to workers without land.

== Aftermath ==
Two years after the killings, the area of the massacre was still occupied and worked by 200 rural families. Of the 17 civilian and military policemen responsible for carrying out the massacre, 13 had been charged and arrested within the first two months, 15 had been charged within the first two years, and one was later cleared of charges. Most of them were allowed to remain on the police force.

A lawyer who had advised the activists before the killings has consistently been the target of threats since the massacre. These have included persistent visits by vehicles of unknown ownership and the delivery of unsolicited packages outside his places of work and residence, including a device that appeared to be a bomb.

The officials who ordered the massacre have not yet been publicly identified.

== See also ==
- 1989 Santa Elmira massacre
- Eldorado do Carajás massacre
- List of massacres in Brazil
