= Mandela Park Backyarders =

South African social movement

The Mandela Park Backyarders or just Backyarders is an unfunded Khayelitsha-based South African social movement made up of poor and marginalised residents of Mandela Park that is working for housing rights and against evictions.

The focus of the movement is on providing legal support for residents on housing issues, fighting for the rights of its members in relation to government housing policies, as well as conducting workshops and democratic discussions about housing issues.

The movement claims to be a socialist movement that believes in direct democracy through open mass meetings with all members invited.

== Campaign against housing corruption ==
Mandela Park Backyarders have alleged widespread corruption in government housing allocation in Mandela Park. They have been successful in compelling the Provincial Housing Department towards organising a probe into the illegal buying and selling of RDP houses in the area. Backyarder protests have also forced provincial government to fire corrupt contractors from Mandela Park developments.

== Protests and arrests of members ==
In September 2009, Mandela Park Backyarders protested against what they called a false promise of 23 houses from MEC for Human Settlements Bonginkosi Madikizela. Twenty three backyarders were then arrested for allegedly vandalising government property. However, Backyarders claim that the 23 members were not involved and that police arrested anyone they could find connected to the Backyarder movement. The case was dismissed due to lack of evidence.

== Philosophy of the movement ==
The Backyarders have become increasingly critical of voting whose purpose they see as providing legitimacy to corrupt politicians despite little change in their condition. They have become fed-up with the voting process which they see as an undemocratic ritual and have threatened not to vote in the upcoming elections.

== See also ==
- Abahlali baseMjondolo in South Africa

The Bhumi Uchhed Pratirodh Committee in India

- The EZLN in Mexico
- Fanmi Lavalas in Haiti
- The Homeless Workers' Movement in Brazil
- The Landless Workers' Movement in Brazil
- Movement for Justice in el Barrio in the United States of America
- Narmada Bachao Andolan in India
- Take Back the Land in the United States of America
