= Sikhula Sonke =

Sikhula Sonke farmworkers union is a women-led Western Cape based independent trade union.

Its focus includes issues such as labour rights, domestic violence, food insecurity and alcohol abuse. The union has over 4000 employed and unemployed members including those living on farms in Stellenbosch, Grabouw, Villiersdorp, Franschhoek, Ceres, Rawsonville, Paarl and Wellington.

Its members resolved to boycott the April 2009 elections as part of the No Land! No House! No Vote! Campaign.

In 2011 it had around 5 000 members on over 200 farms in ten different districts of the Western Cape.

== See also ==
- Bhumi Uchhed Pratirodh Committee in India
- EZLN in Mexico
- Fanmi Lavalas in Haiti
- Homeless Workers' Movement in Brazil
- Landless Workers' Movement in Brazil
- Movement for Justice en el Barrio in the United States of America (USA)
- Narmada Bachao Andolan in India
- Take Back the Land in the USA
