= Tent city =

Temporary housing facility

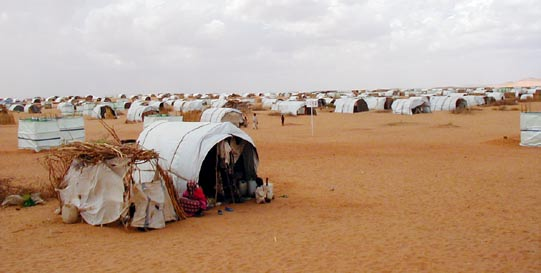
Tent city of 40,000 in Darfur

A tent city is a temporary housing facility made using tents or other temporary structures.

State governments or military organizations set up tent cities to house evacuees, refugees, or soldiers. UNICEF's Supply Division supplies expandable tents for millions of displaced people.

Informal tent cities may be set up without authorization by homeless people or protesters.

Tent cities set up by homeless people may be similar to shanty towns, which are informal settlements in which the buildings are made from scrap building materials.

Shoddy and lower-condition tent cities may be considered skid rows or a facet of them.

== Military ==
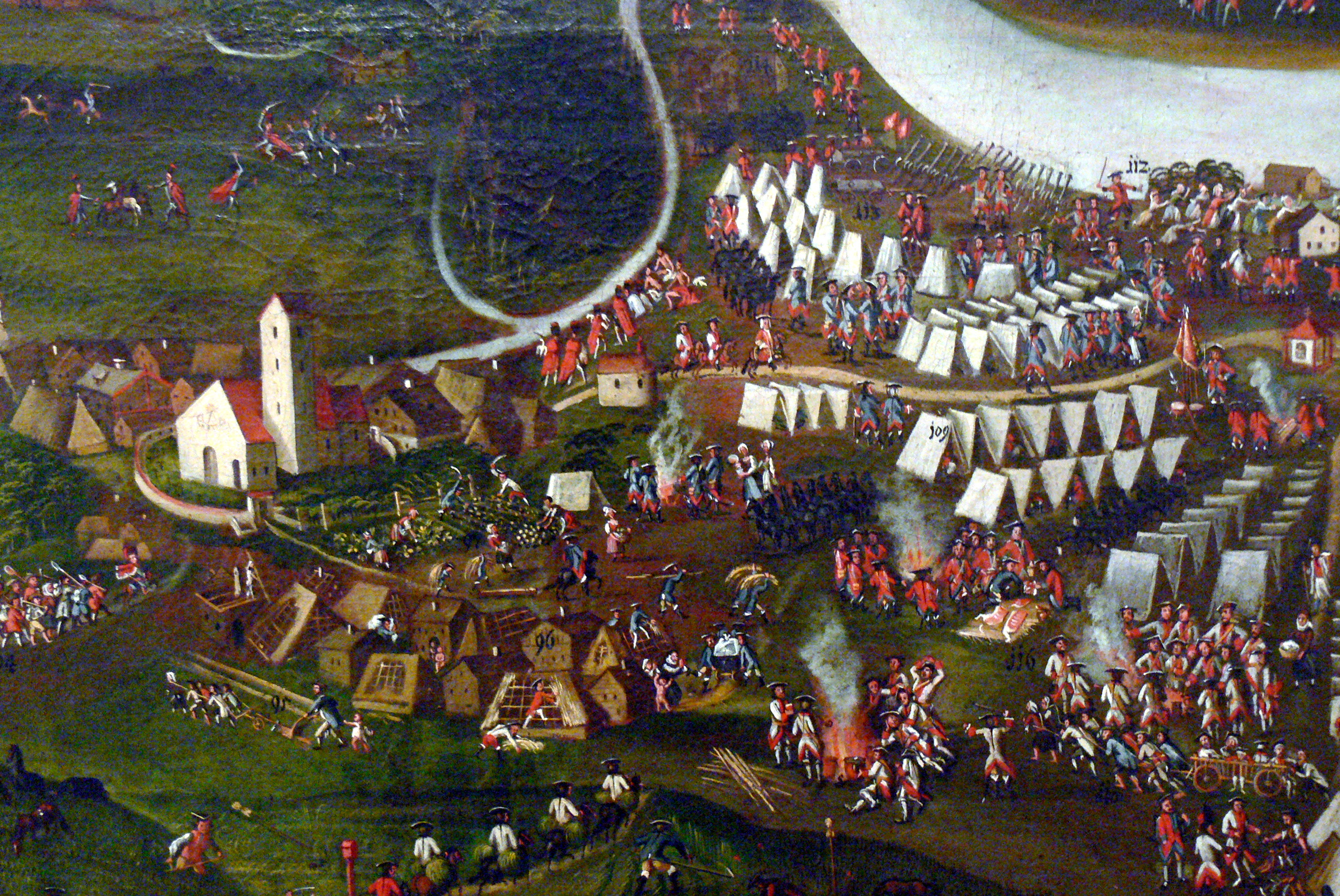
Military camp in the 18th century

In the military, the term "tent city" usually refers to temporary living quarters erected on deployed military bases, such as those found in Bosnia and Herzegovina or Iraq. Depending on the branch of service and the length of time the tent city has been in place, the living space may be equipped with most modern amenities. For sanitary reasons, military tent cities place toilet, shower, and laundry facilities at least 50 feet (15 m) from living quarters. Also, tents are typically divided into clusters of 8–10 to prevent the rapid spread of fire, which is of utmost concern because of the tent and bedding materials.

== Environmental disasters ==
Since Hurricane Katrina made landfall in August 2005, the term has been used to describe temporary housing sites set up for Gulf Coast residents who were left homeless by the storm. Some of the tents that were built by Seabees and funded by the U.S. Federal Emergency Management Agency (FEMA) are wooden structures covered by tents. With the exception of indoor plumbing, most of the tents have heat, air, and lights. The tent city can hold as many as 250 occupants. Displaced residents are only expected to stay for three to six months.

== Homeless people ==
=== Canada ===
==== Toronto, Ontario ====
Toronto, Ontario, Canada's largest city, was also home to its own "Tent City" until September 2002, when the residents of Tent City were evicted by the owner of the property, Home Depot. It was situated in the downtown core of Toronto, near the waterfront, and was home to hundreds of people who were homeless. Toronto introduced rent supplement programs in the following year (2002–2004), by which 115 residents were given access to mainstream apartment units. Journalist Shaughnessy Bishop-Stall voluntarily abandoned his middle-class lifestyle to live in Tent City for a year. He detailed his experiences in his 2005 book, Down to This: Squalor and Splendour in a Big-city Shantytown.

During the COVID-19 pandemic, the city also witnessed a revival of tent cities in its public parks.

=== United States ===
Full-time tent living can be a way to save money, but it has some challenges. One of the main ones is finding an appropriate location and community. An alternative to tents that has gained popularity in the 21st century is tiny or mobile tiny homes. These homes were utilized for disaster relief housing following Hurricane Katrina in 2006, showcasing the advantages of tiny homes over traditional tents. In the 21st century, while the estimated absolute number of homeless people has decreased, tent cities have increased in large cities. Tent cities have also formed from mass protests and are not always related to homelessness.

Some cities have sponsored tent cities publicly to cut down on homelessness, while in other cases, informally formed tent cities have been torn down by cities.

==== Philadelphia, Pennsylvania ====
Tent cities have long been a part of Philadelphia's history. The steadily growing number of encampments has been passed down by multiple civil administrations—from Wilson Goode (1984–1992) to the present-day's Cherelle Parker (2024–present). The collection of encampments developed for multiple reasons. Some started as contained protests for affordable housing; others were attempts to establish secure living through a developed community.

When assessing the number of homeless people in Philadelphia, the Office of Homeless Services counted 958 people on the streets. Non-profit organizations like Project H.O.M.E. have made efforts to help by "providing housing, opportunities for employment, medical care, and education to homeless and low-income persons".

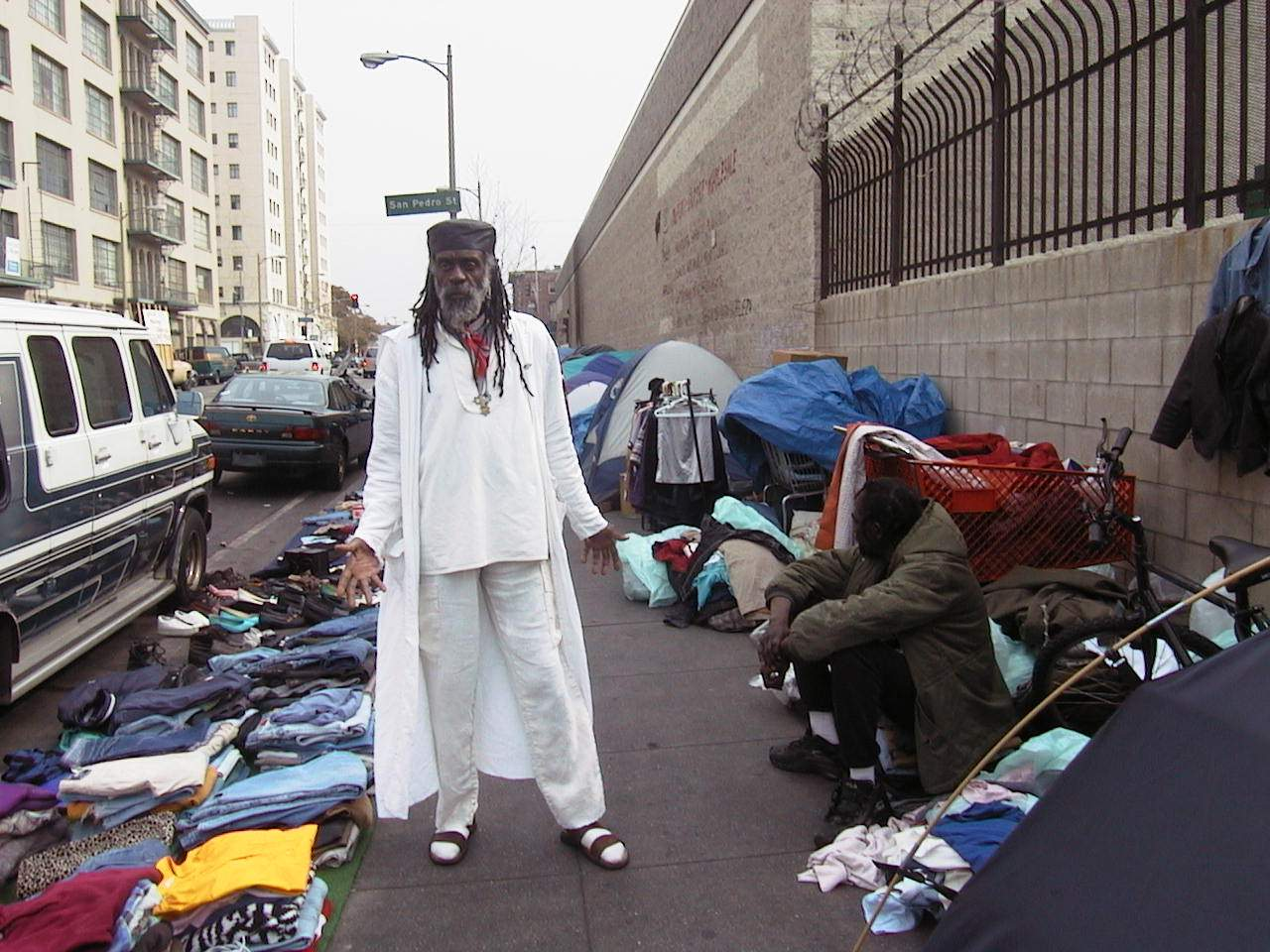
Skid Row, Los Angeles contains one of the largest stable populations, between 5,000 and 8,000, of homeless people in the United States.

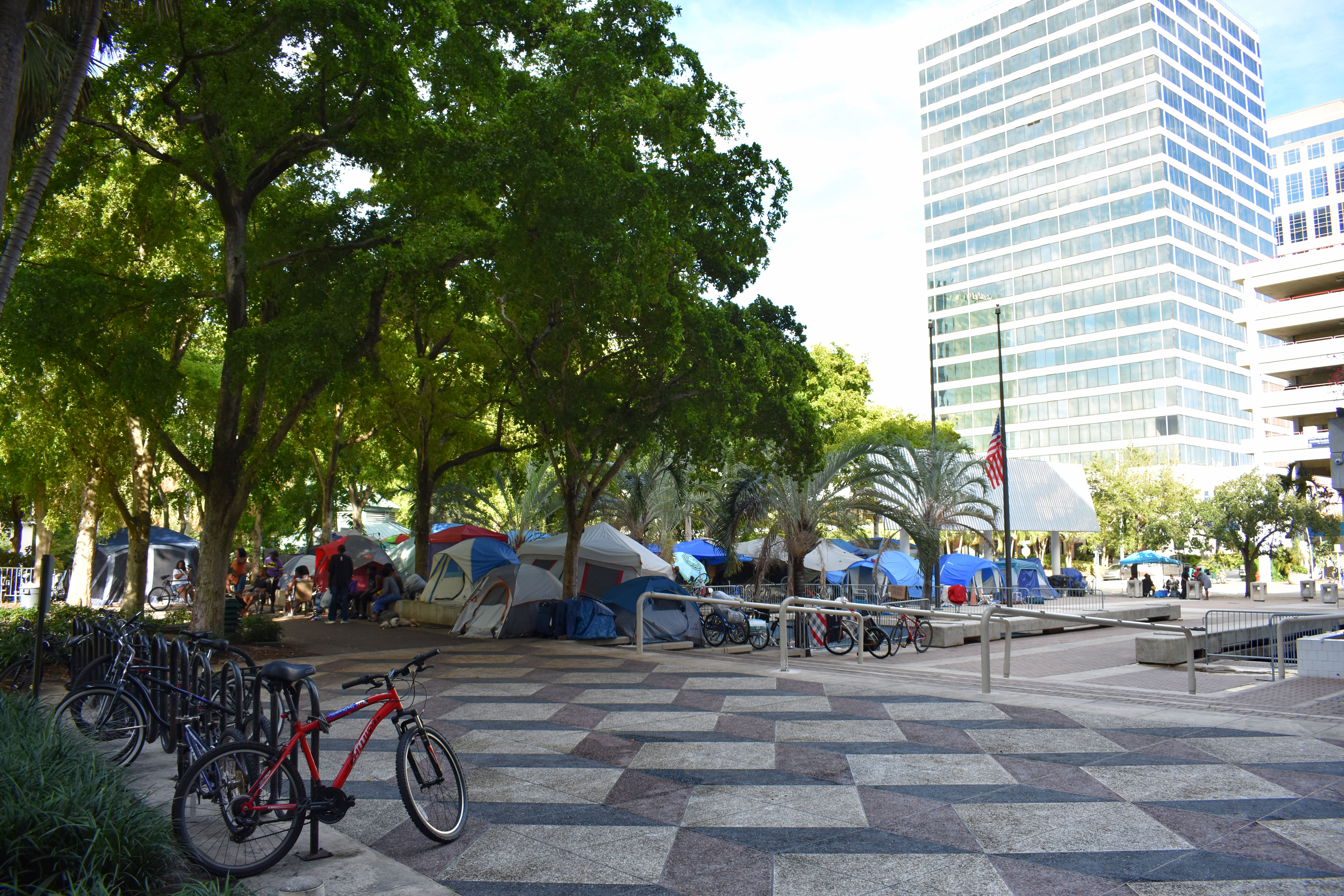
A homeless camp in Fort Lauderdale, Florida

==== Camp Hope: Las Cruces, New Mexico ====
Camp Hope is an alternative transitional living project for people experiencing homelessness through camping. It is located on the Mesilla Valley Community of Hope (MVCH) campus and is an alliance of agencies that address homelessness in Las Cruces, New Mexico. The tent city can house 50 people who would otherwise be on the streets, providing them with a safe place to seek direct services, healthcare, jobs, and housing. Camp Hope has allowed people without housing to be right next to all the services the agencies on the MVCH campus provide. The camp was founded in November 2011 with temporary permission from Las Cruces. It was supposed to disband in March 2012, but no funding was available to build another shelter and the City Council stated that the tent city benefited the city.

In 2013, with help from engineering students from New Mexico State University, the site was rezoned as a planned unit development that sanctioned a permanent campground along with a number of other uses on the non-profit's campus.

==== Second Chance Village: Akron, Ohio ====
This service club, made up of homeless and formerly homeless members, was founded by Ryan Scanlon and operated its tent city operations in the rear of private property owned by Sage Lewis LLC in the Middlebury area of Akron, Ohio from January 2017 until January 2019. It was known as Second Chance Village and remains a nonprofit service club organization in secret locations, splintered amongst the cityscape.

Writing for The New York Times in 2018, Mitch Smith wrote about the village, describing a homeless-run culture wherein people experiencing homelessness created a drug-free, alcohol-free community with security officers and a democratically elected tri-council. All services were run by people experiencing homelessness, including a laundry, showers, a computer lab, a clothing room, and a food pantry.

Akron City Council rejected Mr. Lewis's request for a zoning exception on an 8-to-4 vote in September 2018.

All tents were forced to be removed by January 5, 2019.

==== California ====
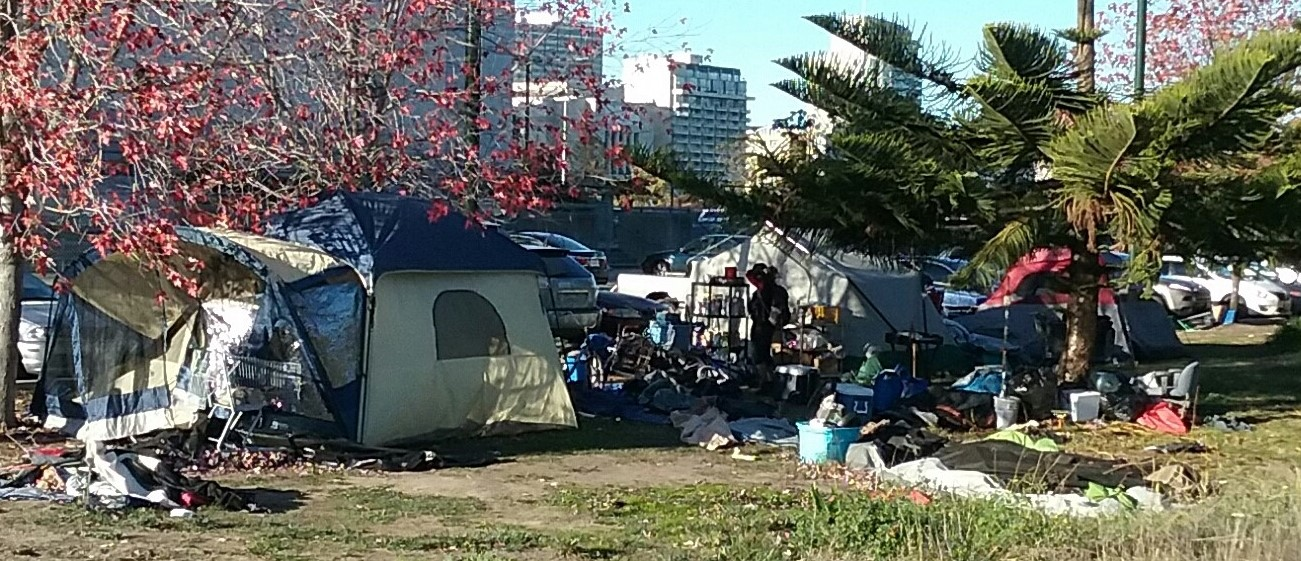
A homeless camp in Oakland, California, near Laney College campus

Homelessness in California is a serious issue, if going by the per capita rate in 2020 of homelessness, which ranks third in the US behind New York and Hawaii. 0.4% or more of Californians are homeless, and most major cities have homeless populations hovering around 0.5–1% of the city's population. This includes both sheltered and unsheltered homeless. Tent cities are prevalent in Tenderloin, San Francisco, and Skid Row, Los Angeles.

The BBC ran a news story in 2008 about the then-crisis in the US economy that forced many Americans, who used to own their own homes, to live in tents.

AlterNet published a story in 2009 about the mainstream media finally "discovering" the homeless situation in Sacramento.

==== Minneapolis, Minnesota ====
Minneapolis experienced the emergence and growth of homeless encampments in the aftermath of the murder of George Floyd and resulting unrest in mid-2020. The Minneapolis Park and Recreation Board had an experimental process to permit homeless encampments on city park property. Homeless encampments appeared at 44 park sites during the summer months. The park board closed all camps on January 7, 2021, and discontinued permits.

==== St. Petersburg, Florida ====
In late December 2006, homeless people formed an impromptu tent city on the St. Vincent de Paul property in the 1400 block of Fourth Avenue N in Saint Petersburg, Florida, when dozens of homeless moved off of public land across the street. In early January 2007, city officials noted city codes that prohibit living in tents and gave the owners one week to evict the occupants of the tent city.

==== Olympia, Washington ====
Camp Quixote, a homeless encampment, began as a protest movement of homeless people and homeless advocates against criminalizing "anti-social" legislation that was passed by the city in January 2007, specifically referring to the ordinance restricting people from sitting on sidewalks. City officials ordered the camp to disband. The Olympia Unitarian Universalist Congregation offered the encampment sanctuary on its property, being familiar with the Seattle faith-based network of homeless encampments. What began as a protest surrounding homelessness quickly became a faith community protest. The religious community protested the city's insistence on dismantling the homeless encampment because churches maintain a specific land use right that allows them to offer sanctuary to the poor (Religious Land Use and Institutionalized Persons Act). Eventually, the adversarial protest turned to negotiation with local municipalities, with new ordinances condoning Camp Quixote with specific regulations and a 90-day limit and an option to move to other faith communities' property.

==== Seattle, Washington ====
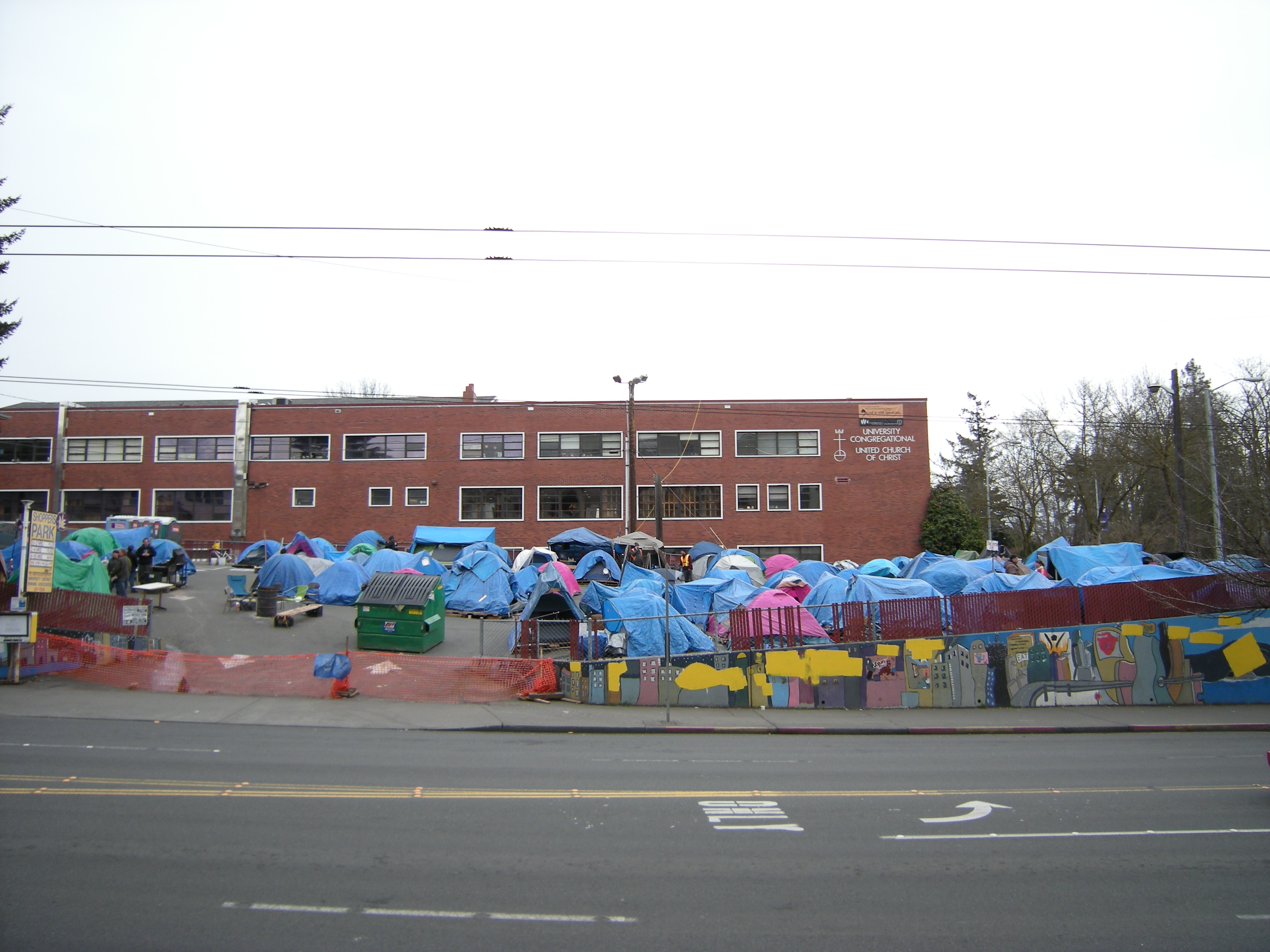
Nickelsville toward the end of its stay in Seattle's University District

Homeless people have long resorted to seeking shelter in tents, but such communities are one of the first known to be organized by a sponsoring organization (a partnership between the Seattle Housing and Resource Effort and Women's Housing Equality and Enhancement League (SHARE/WHEEL)) and are one of the first in a major U.S. city to be largely accepted by local governments. Contrary to some stereotypes regarding the homeless, many residents of Tent City are employed, mostly in temporary or day labor jobs, but have insufficient income to obtain more permanent housing.

The original Tent City and Tent City 2, created in the late 1990s, were created illegally and opposed by the City of Seattle. After being tolerated for some time, they were eventually forced to shut down. In March 2002, as a result of a legal battle, city attorney Tom Carr and SHARE/WHEEL attorney Ted Hunter signed a court-ordered consent decree with SHARE, allowing Tent City only on private land (by invitation) and setting standards for its operation.

Based on the consent decree, Tent City 3 was created and rotates around the Metro Seattle Core. Tent City 4 was created in May 2004 as an attempt to expand beyond the consent decree and use public land and resources, something the consent decree does not allow. This attempt was unsuccessful, and Tent City 4 has since been relocated to eastern King County, where it is church sponsored. Tent City rules do not allow drug or alcohol use and evicts anyone caught stealing or committing other crimes within the camp. Tent City 3 stayed an average of three weeks at each encampment before 2004, while Tent City 4 stayed in place for as long as 100 days. Since then, Tent City 3's stays have averaged between 60 and 90 days, with 90 days or so being a common length of stay. Cities have been adopting code amendments that limit stays to 60–90 days.

Another homeless encampment, unaffiliated with Tent City 3 and 4, lived in donated, mainly fuchsia, tents at the University Congregational United Church of Christ in Seattle's University District for several months ending March 5, 2009. At that time, it moved to the suburb of Bryn Mawr south of Seattle. According to homeless advocates, residents criticized Seattle Mayor Greg Nickels for continuously clearing out homeless encampments, and named their encampment "Nickelsville". Out of respect for Mayor Nickels's recent efforts, the church did not use the "Nickelsville" name in referring to the encampment.

While on the road in Seattle, Washington, on March 30, 2009, Democracy Now! covered a story about Seattle's Nickelsville. They also covered a story about the police raid on Nickelsville the previous day, March 29, where 24 people were arrested.

==== King County, Washington ====
Tent City 4 (TC4) is a homeless encampment of up to 100 people created in May 2004 in eastern King County outside of Seattle. Residents are adult men and women, although there is a provision for quartering minor dependents in emergencies.

==== Transition Park, Camden, New Jersey ====
A community of 50 to 150 people had taken up residence in Camden, New Jersey, nestled on the right side of the I676 West exit 5A ramp. Although attempts have been made to find housing for the population, no one has been placed. Transition Park's Mayor and City Council continued to protect their community and seek medical attention for those in need. In May 2010, residents were forced out of the city and into local missions.

Under the leadership of Amir Khan, the pastor of Solid Rock Worship Center in Clementon, NJ, and founder of the Nehemiah Group, a faith-based nonprofit organization that Khan and his son Micah run, 54 residents of Tent City were moved to the Wingate by Wyndham Hotel in Mount Laurel in May 2010 with the help of volunteers. Pastor Khan asked his congregation and local business members for help and raised $250,000 to provide some homeless people of Camden's Tent City with housing and human services for at least one year.

Although these homeless men and women were initially moved to a hotel and received a spa treatment upon arrival, months later, drugs and alcohol are taking a toll on their adjustment to life in their new environments. On the positive side, Lorenzo Banks, the ex-self-appointed Mayor of Tent City, and James Boggs, another Tent City leader, got jobs providing homeless outreach for Volunteers of America-Delaware Valley in Collingswood, NJ. Although several people also enrolled in community college, mental illness, addiction issues, and a lack of affordable housing illustrates the roadblocks to a healthy life for Tent City residents over the long term.

By September 13, 2010, 19 of the original 54 were removed from the "hotel program" and many former Tent City residents continue to move from one street corner or overpass to another, continuing the homelessness issue in Camden.

==== Potomac Mills, Woodbridge, Virginia ====
Since c. 2003, there exists a 10 acres (4.0 ha) tent city at Potomac Mills in Woodbridge, Virginia, adjacent to the Potomac Mills mall. The private landlord tolerates it. In 2018, some of the residents were directed to leave.

==== Other locations ====
Tent cities are also found in the following locations: Ann Arbor, Michigan; Chattanooga, Tennessee; Columbus, Ohio; Athens, Georgia; Atlanta, Georgia; Reno, Nevada; Sierra Vista, Arizona; Providence, Rhode Island: Sacramento, California; San Diego, California; Santa Rosa, California; San Francisco; San Jose, California; Oakland, California; Berkeley, California Lakewood, New Jersey; Lowell, Massachusetts; Huntsville, Alabama; Nashville, Tennessee; St. Louis, Missouri; Ft. Worth, Texas; and Buffalo, New York; Umoja Village, built by Take Back the Land, was a shantytown in Miami created to protest gentrification and a lack of low-income housing in Miami. Another tent city, Tent City, was a temporary refugee center constructed of bedsheets aboard Carnival Triumph during the infamous Carnival Triumph Fire of 2013 when power to the vessel was gone.

== Events ==
=== 1913 Gettysburg reunion ===
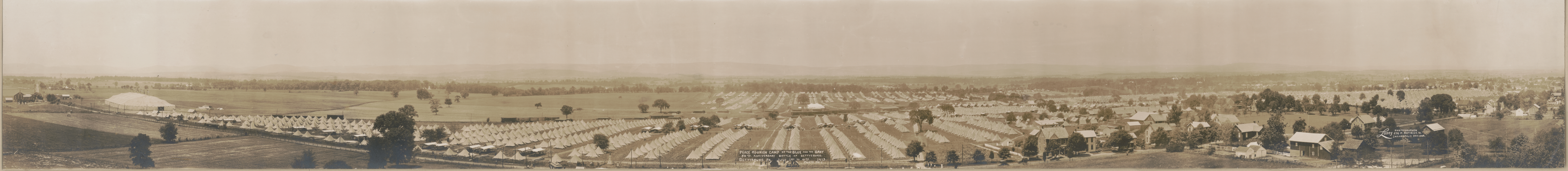
Panorama of the Great Camp on the Gettysburg Battlefield

At the 1913 Gettysburg reunion, the United States Department of War set up a tent city that housed over 50,000 Civil War veterans.

=== Hajj ===
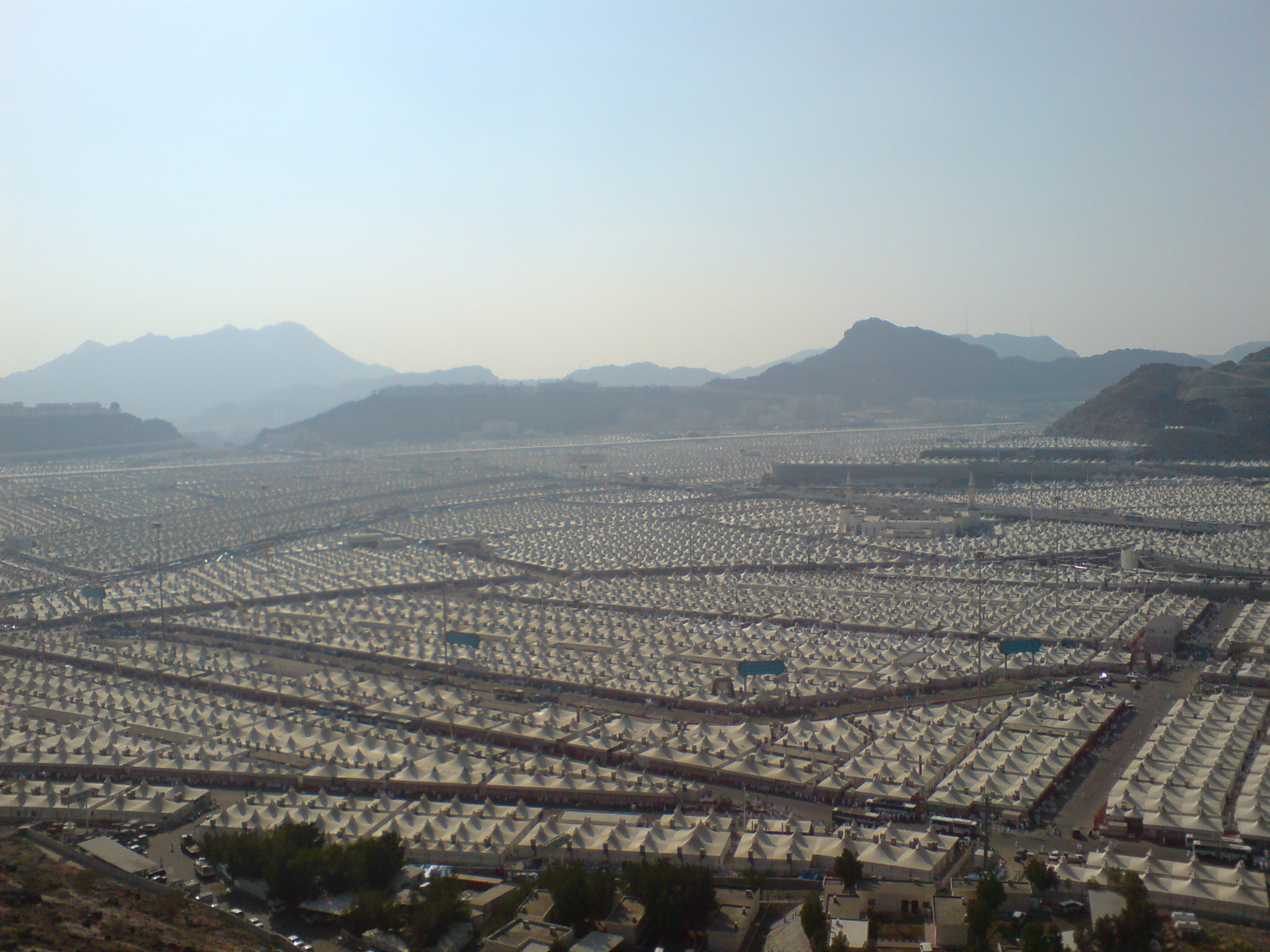
Mina, tent city

The Saudi Arabian government's Ministry of Hajj has set up a permanent tent city to house Muslim pilgrims in Mina, where the ritual Stoning of the Devil takes place as part of the overall Hajj pilgrimage to Mecca. A tent city is also set up at Mount Arafat, another essential stop during the Hajj. Because up to four million pilgrims may be performing the Hajj annually, the tent cities are densely inhabited with 20–40 people per tent. As such, fire and disease outbreaks were constant concerns. Since the late 1990s, Saudi authorities have started using fireproof tents to reduce the risks of a major fire.

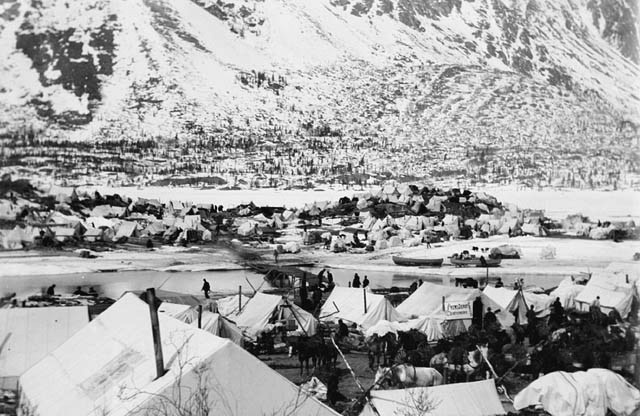
Klondikers tent camp at lake Bennett, Canada, May 1898

=== Klondike and Nome Gold Rushes ===
During the Klondike Gold Rush in Alaska and Canada 1896–1899, several tent camps were built along the routes to the gold fields, especially on the popular Dyea/Skagway route, where it met Lake Bennett and Lake Lindeman, the head of the Yukon River. At the Nome Gold Rush, between 1899 and 1909, a tent city sprang up that was 30 miles long, on the beaches and on the treeless coast of Nome, Alaska between Cape Rodney and Cape Nome.

=== Great Depression ===
During the Great Depression a number of tent cities and shanty towns named Hoovervilles emerged in the United States and some other countries on the outskirts of towns, newspapers used as covers were referred to as “Hoover blankets.”

=== Persepolis ===
For the festivities of the 2,500 year celebration of Iran's monarchy, the Shah of Iran, Mohammad Reza Pahlavi, built a luxurious tent city in the desert next to the ruins of Persepolis to accommodate his international guests. The event took place October 12–16, 1971. The tent city was inspired by the tent city of the Field of the Cloth of Gold meeting between Francis I of France and Henry VIII of England that took place in 1520.

== Other applications ==
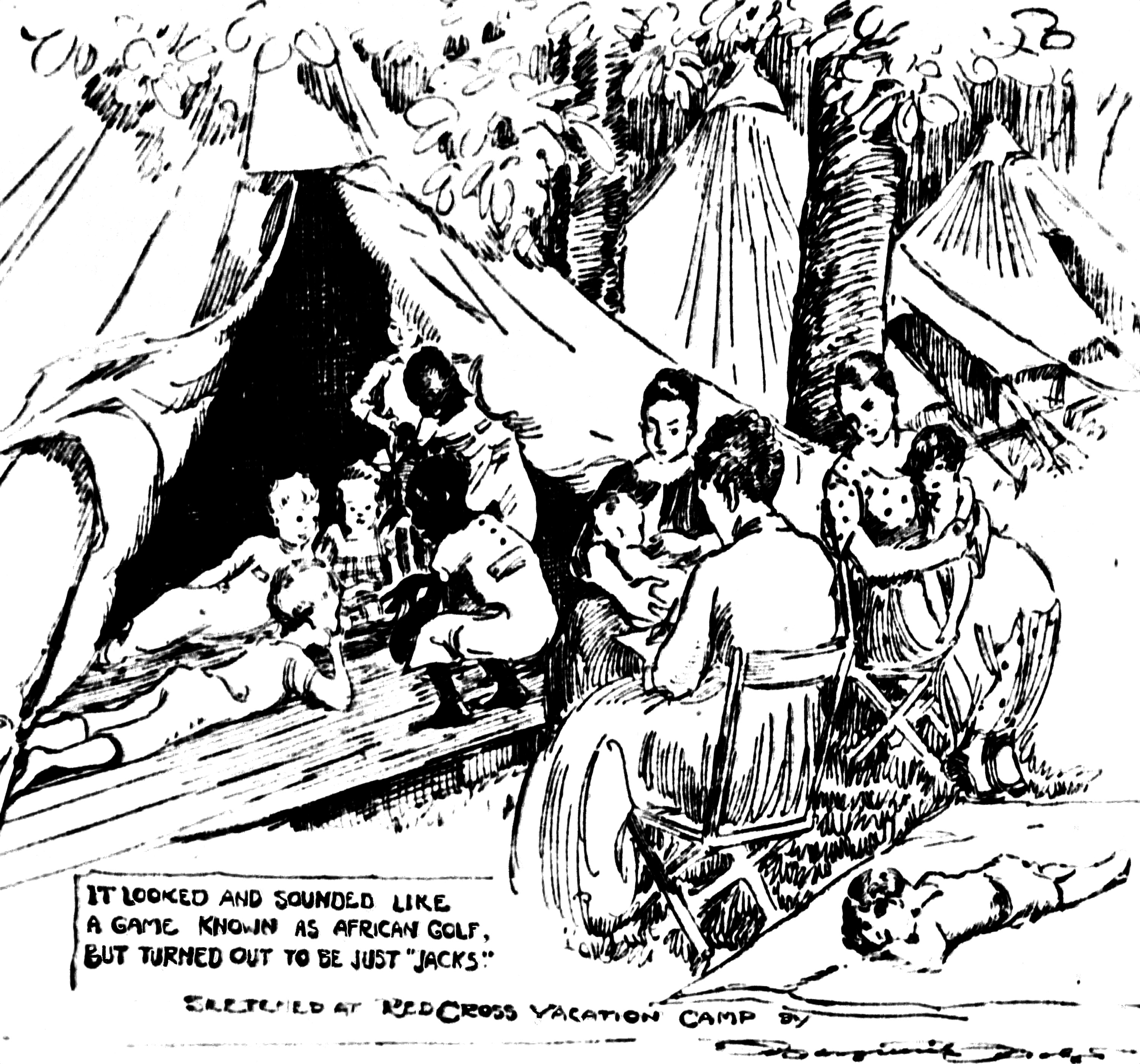
A tent city was erected in 1920 by the Red Cross in Forest Park, St. Louis, so city families could get away from the August heat. (Drawing by Marguerite Martyn of the St. Louis Post-Dispatch.)

=== Fayette County, Tennessee ===
Tent City in Fayette County, Tennessee, United States, was an encampment for displaced blacks who were removed from their homes and blacklisted from buying amenities as retaliation for registering to vote in the early days of the Civil Rights Movement.

=== West Virginia University ===
Throughout the week of October 26 to November 1, 2014, hundreds of West Virginia University students camped out in "Tent City" prior to ESPN's College GameDay.

=== Kent State University ===
On May 12, 1977, a tent city was erected and maintained for a period of more than 60 days by a group of several dozen protesters on the campus of Kent State University in Kent, Ohio, United States. The protesters, led by the May 4 Coalition but also including community members and local clergy, were attempting to prevent the university from erecting a gymnasium annex on part of the site where the Kent State shootings occurred in May 1970, which they believed would alter and obscure that historical event. Law enforcement finally brought the tent city to an end on July 12, 1977, after the forced removal and arrest of 193 people. The event gained national press coverage and the issue was taken to the U.S. Supreme Court.

=== Music ===
Chicago band Patience Gloria's second album Consequences David has a song titled "Tent City Nation" that addresses the subject.

- Bolton Hall, activist who established a tent city in New York city in 1908

The area at music festivals for attendees to set up their tents for overnight stays is often called "Tent City".

=== Protests ===
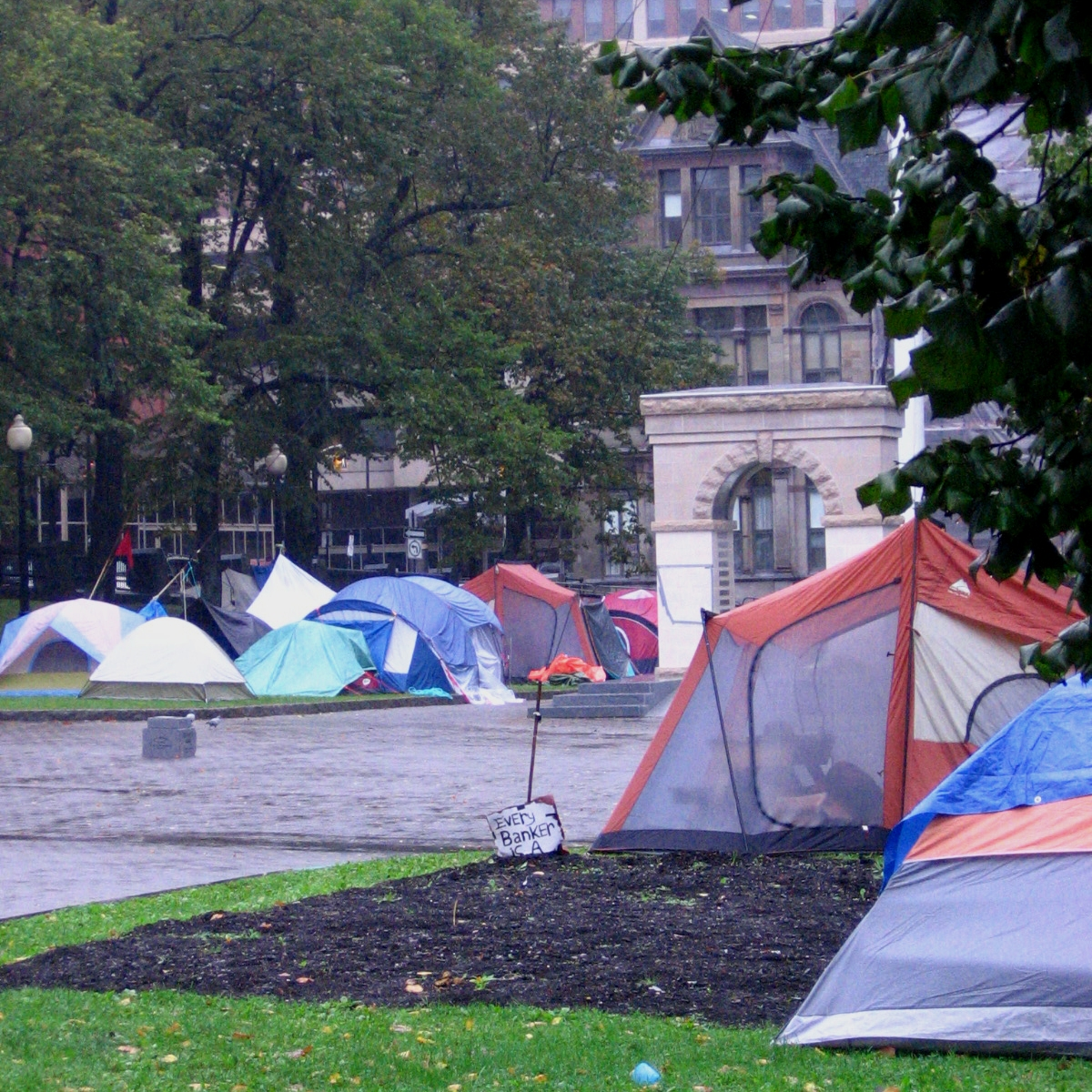
Occupy tent city in Halifax, Nova Scotia (2011)

- Occupy movement was an international protest movement that featured tent cities set up in parks in some cities.

=== Maricopa County Jail modification ===
Prior to the election of Sheriff Joe Arpaio in 1993, the prisoner population in Maricopa County Jail, Arizona, the fourth largest jail system in the world, exceeded the maximum number of inmates allowed in its facilities. Prisoners were routinely released from custody prior to completing their sentence due to the overcrowding. In a study conducted in 1993 it was estimated that construction of a new facility would cost approximately $70,000,000. Sheriff Arpaio, concerned about the cost of a new facility and reasoning that military tents were good enough for the men and women of the U.S. armed forces who fought in the Gulf War, ordered that tent jails be constructed using inmate labor. It consisted of Korean War–era tents donated by the United States armed forces, and a 50 feet (15 m) observation tower with a vacancy sign mounted on the front. The final cost of the project was approximately $100,000 and it was capable of housing over 2,400 inmates. Tent City was closed in October 2017.

== See also ==
- List of tent cities in the United States
- Protest camp
- Squatting
- Shanty town
