= Landless People's Movement =

Social movement in South Africa

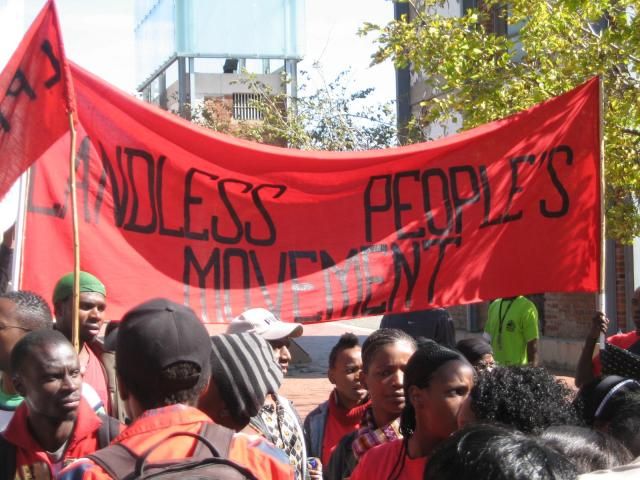
The Landless People's Movement outside the Constitutional Court, 14 May 2009

The Landless People's Movement was an independent social movement in South Africa. It consisted of rural people and people living in shack settlements in cities. The Landless People's Movement boycotted parliamentary elections and had a history of conflict with the African National Congress. The Landless People's Movement was affiliated to Via Campesina internationally and its Johannesburg branches to the Poor People's Alliance in South Africa.

== History ==
On 24 July 2001 provincial representatives of local landless formations met with regional organisations to unite their grievances and collectively seek change to relieve their struggles. The Landless People's Movement was formed out of this meeting

Its stated aims were:

- to strengthen the capacity of the rural landless to organise effectively and advocate for themselves
- to speed up land reform and hold the government to account on their promises
- to draw on a wider South/South network to support initiatives of landless people in South Africa
- to develop public awareness nationally and internationally about the needs of rural landless communities in South Africa

The movement was initially formed and support by an NGO, the National Land Committee (NLC), but in 2003 it broke with the NLC after which it operated autonomously.

On 13 November 2003 the movement issued a Memorandum to then President Thabo Mbeki asking "why is development brought to us through guns and the terror" and demanding an immediate halt to all evictions on farms and from urban squatter camps.

In 2008 the Protea South branch in Johannesburg won a landmark court order against the city of Johannesburg.

The Landless People's Movement has been described as being successful in linking the commonalities between both rural and urban land dispossession.

== Branches in Johannesburg ==
The Johannesburg Landless Peoples' Movement had branches in the following shack settlements:

- Protea South
- Harry Gwala
- Freedom Park
- Thembelihle
- Precast
- Lawley
- Protea Glen

== State repression ==
In April 2004 57 members of the movement were arrested on election day for marching under the banner of 'No Land! No Vote!'. Some of the arrested activists were subject to torture and this was later taken up in court action against the police.

In September 2007 the Freedom of Expression Institute reported that at a peaceful protest by the Landless People's Movement:

SAPS members fired at random towards the protesters, leaving the pavement covered with the blue casings of rubber bullets. Police also deployed a helicopter and water cannon, and we saw at least two officers using live ammunition. One Protea South resident, Mandisa Msewu, was shot in the mouth by a rubber bullet, and several other residents were attended to by paramedics due to police violence.

In February 2009 the movement reported that eight Landless People's Movement activists from Protea South were arrested following a peaceful protest.

The movement claims to have been subject to severe repression in Johannesburg in 2010, including arrest, arson and murder. Also in 2010 one of the movement's activists, Terrance Mbuleo (33), was murdered by middle class vigilantes in Soweto.

== Poor People's Alliance ==
In September 2008 the Western Cape Anti-Eviction Campaign, together with Abahlali baseMjondolo, the Johannesburg branches of the Landless People's Movement and the Rural Network (Abahlali basePlasini) in KwaZulu-Natal formed the Poor People's Alliance. The poor people's alliance refused electoral politics under the banner 'No Land! No House! No Vote!'.

== See also ==
- Abahlali baseMjondolo in South Africa
- Homeless Workers' Movement in Brazil
- Landless Workers' Movement in Brazil
- Landless People's Movement (Namibia)
- Movement for Justice in el Barrio in the United States
- Narmada Bachao Andolan in India
- Take Back the Land in the US
- Zapatista Army of National Liberation in Mexico
- Via Campesina
