= No Land! No House! No Vote! =

Voter abstention campaign slogan in South Africa

No Land! No House! No Vote! is a campaign by a number of poor people's movements in South Africa that calls for the boycotting of the vote and a general rejection of party politics and vote banking. The name is meant to imply that if government does not deliver on issues important to affected communities (such as land and housing) these movements will not vote.

== History ==
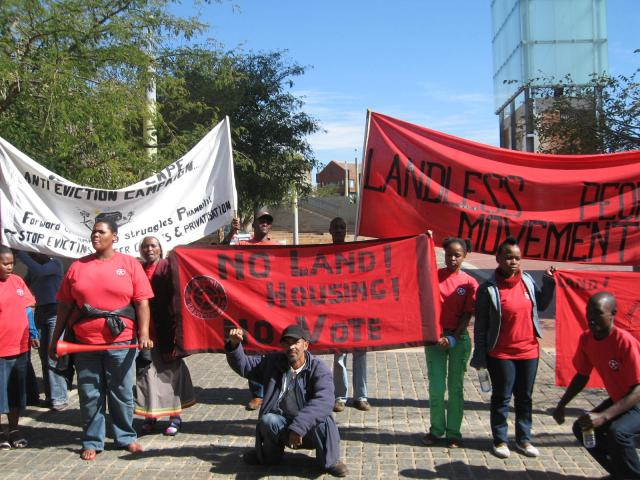
Protesters outside the Constitutional Court in 2009

The No Land! No House! No Vote! campaign began as a national campaign by the South African Landless Peoples Movement (LPM) in 2004. Originally called the No Land! No Vote! campaign, the Landless People's Movement and the National Land Committee argued that voters have to be registered in their home ward to vote and that it would be impossible to vote if families were under threat of eviction or had no secure tenure. Amnesty International has reported that LPM activists were tortured during the 2004 national government elections after taking on a 'No Land! No Vote' position.

In 2006, the Western Cape Anti-Eviction Campaign and Abahlali baseMjondolo movements boycotted the municipal elections under the banner of this campaign. The AEC held an election day march in Cape Town saying they would abstain from voting. A march by Abahlali baseMjondolo under the banner of the No Land! No House! No Vote! campaign was illegally banned by the Durban Municipality and was met with police repression.

In 2008, the Landless Peoples Movement, the Western Cape Anti-Eviction Campaign and Abahlali baseMjondolo and the Rural Network joined to form the Poor People's Alliance. In 2009, the Alliance voted to boycott the national elections under the No Land! No House! No Vote! banner.

During the 2009 national election campaign, the No Vote! campaign suffered severe repression by political parties and police. On 8 February 2009, the South African Police allegedly beat and tear-gassed Gugulethu residents who were holding a meeting about housing because the ANC provincial chairperson Mcebisi Skwatsha claimed they were disrupting voters registration. Eight members of the Landless Peoples Movement were also arrested in March 2009 and some claim that this is related to the No Vote! campaign by the Poor Peoples Alliance.

In the 2009 elections 39% of potential voters supported the ANC.

Abahlali baseMjondolo called for a boycott of the 2011 local government elections. They were joined by a range of other social movements including the Western Cape Anti-Eviction Campaign, the Mandela Park Backyarders, Sikhula Sonke, the South African Unemployed Peoples' Movement and the Landless People's Movement. Local community organisations also organised vote strikes in a number of towns around the country including, for instance, King William's Town, Ficksburg, Grahamstown and Cato Ridge. A total of 42% of registered voters did not vote in the elections. It has been reported that "Nearly 75% of South Africans aged 20–29 did not vote in the 2011 [local government] elections" and that "South Africans in that age group were more likely to have taken part in violent (sic) street protests against the local ANC than to have voted for the ruling party".

== Reasoning behind the campaign ==
Proponents of the No Land! No House! No Vote! campaign have explained the reasons behind their campaign. There are a variety of reasons for boycotting elections but most people who take this position say that they have been voting since 1994 but have seen no positive result from voting. They also often claim that politicians are all corrupt and that there are no political parties that represent the poor. Proponents also make the structural argument that the electoral process itself is undemocratic, that poor people must speak for themselves, and that the movements should be unaligned and pressure whichever political party comes into power.

== Variations on the campaign ==
Proponents of the No Land! No House! No Vote! Campaign have come up with similar slogans which have included the statements 'No Jobs!', 'No Electricity!', 'No Water!', 'No Respect!', 'No Freedom!' as part of the 'No Vote!' boycott campaign.

== International connections ==
The Chicago Anti-Eviction Campaign has used the slogan 'No House No Vote'.

== Criticisms of the campaign ==
According to South African President Jacob Zuma "If you do not vote, you are depriving yourself of a freedom we have fought for and given you. You are deciding to oppress yourself...you are failing yourself and the nation.

== See also ==
- Abahlali baseMjondolo
- Abstention
- The Landless Peoples Movement
- The Poor People's Alliance
- The Mandela Park Backyarders
- Sikhula Sonke
- The Western Cape Anti-Eviction Campaign
- The Zabalaza Anarchist Communist Front
