= Western Cape Anti-Eviction Campaign =

Movement in Cape Town, South Africa

Official logo of the Western Cape Anti-Eviction Campaign

The Western Cape Anti-Eviction Campaign was a non-racial popular movement made up of poor and oppressed communities in Cape Town, South Africa. It was formed in November 2000 with the aim of fighting evictions, water cut-offs and poor health services, obtaining free electricity, securing decent housing, and opposing police brutality.

The movement was the first of the first generation of so-called 'new social movements' to spring up after the end of apartheid and was known for its direct action style militancy, its refusal of all forms of vanguardism, including NGO (Non-Governmental Organisations) authoritarianism. The movement sought to retain its autonomy from NGOs and publicly refused to work with some local NGOs and insisted that the middle class left respect the autonomy of grassroots movements.

The AEC was a founding member of the Poor People's Alliance and, along with the other members of the alliance, refused all electoral politics and encouraged the development of popular power rather than voting for political parties.

The AEC mobilised against the 2008 xenophobic attacks in the areas where it was strong.

The AEC opposed evictions related to the FIFA 2010 World Cup.

== Communities ==
The AEC is currently an umbrella body for over 10 community organisations, crisis committees, and concerned residents movements who have come together to organise and demand their rights to basic services. The organisations that make up the AEC include but are not limited to:

- Tafelsig Mitchell's Plain
- Blikkiesdorp Informal Committee (Delft)
- The Crossroads Anti-Eviction Campaign (Nyanga)
- The Delft Integrated Network (Delft)
- The Eastridge Anti-Eviction Campaign (Mitchell's Plain)
- The Gugulethu Anti-Eviction Campaign (Gugulethu)
- The Hanover Park Anti-Eviction Campaign (Hanover Park)
- The Mandela Park Backyarders (Khayelitsha)
- Newfields Village Community Representative Committee (Hanover Park)
- Nyanga East Anti-Eviction Campaign (Nyanga)
- The Symphony Way Anti-Eviction Campaign (Delft)
- The Woodridge Anti-Eviction Campaign (Mitchell's Plain)
- Zille-Raine Heights (Parkwood)

Affiliated movements and committees in the Western Cape:

- QQ Section Concerned Residents (Khayelitsha)
- Abahlali baseMjondolo of the Western Cape
- Sikhula Sonke Women Farmworkers Union
- Joe Slovo Liberative Residents (Langa)
- Hangberg Solution Seekers Association (Hout Bay)
- KTC Concerned Residents Movement (Nyanga)
- Mitchell’s Plain Concerned Hawkers and Traders Association (Mitchell's Plain)
- Gugulethu Informal Traders (Gugulethu)
- Gatesville Informal Traders Association (Athlone)

== Coordinators ==
The Western Cape Anti-Eviction Campaign had an umbrella structure with an executive committee of a chairperson, a vice chairperson, a secretary, a vice secretary, a treasurer, and five regional coordinators.

== Activities ==
The AEC opposes evictions and water and electricity cut-offs on many different levels. Activities range from legal actions that challenge the constitutionality of evictions, to mass mobilisation and popular education initiatives, to organisation and capacity building programs. The movement has also confronted local gangs and in July 2012 one of its leading activists, Soraya Nordien, was murdered following threats from gang members.

== Campaigns ==
Since its inception, the Anti-Eviction Campaign (AEC) has called for an end to all evictions and cut-offs of basic services in the Western Cape. In 2001, the AEC achieved a 6-month moratorium on all evictions in the Cape Town Unicity. Even though the DA had declared the moratorium, illegal evictions continued.

The movement strongly supported the struggle for the Symphony Way Pavement Dwellers to resist forced removal to the notorious Blikkiesdorp transit camp and to demand access to decent housing.

No Land! No House! No Vote! is the name of a campaign by autonomous grassroots movements to boycott elections and reject party politics and vote banking in South Africa. In 2009, the Poor People's Alliance voted to boycott the national elections under the No Land! No House! No Vote! Banner.

The 2010 FIFA World Cup was connected to a large number of evictions in South Africa which many claimed were meant to 'beautify the city'. The WC-AEC campaigned against all evictions caused by the event. The campaign's hotspots included the anti-gentrification issues in Gympie Street and other parts of Woodstock, the national N2 Gateway housing project and its evictions in Joe Slovo and Delft, Sea Point evictions, and evictions in Q-Town next to Athlone Stadium.

The movement is committed to opposing xenophobia and has been particularly active in this regard in Gugulethu where it has set up a forum for these issues to be discussed. According to both the media and the local police the forum has had considerable success in reducing xenophobic hostility. However the movement's anti-xenophobic work has cost it some popular support and resulted in an arson attack on one of the movement's leaders.

The movement produces its own media.

== Poor People's Alliance ==
In September 2008 the Western Cape Anti-Eviction Campaign, together with Abahlali baseMjondolo, the Landless People's Movement and the Rural Network (Abahlali baseplasini) formed the Poor People's Alliance. The poor people's alliance refused electoral politics under the banner 'No Land! No House! No Vote!'. It has been reported that "Nearly 75% of South Africans aged 20-29 did not vote in the 2011 [local government] elections" and that "South Africans in that age group were more likely to have taken part in (sic) violent street protests against the local ANC than to have voted for the ruling party".

== Influence ==
Take Back the Land in Miami and the Chicago Anti-Eviction Campaign have both stated that their work is inspired by that of the Western Cape Anti-Eviction Campaign. The Chicago Anti-Eviction Campaign has used the slogan 'No House No Vote'.

== See also ==
- Abahlali baseMjondolo in South Africa
- Bhumi Uchhed Pratirodh Committee in India
- EZLN in Mexico
- Fanmi Lavalas in Haiti
- Homeless Workers' Movement in Brazil
- Movement for Justice en el Barrio in the United States of America (USA)
- Narmada Bachao Andolan in India
- Take Back the Land in the USA

== Films and Books ==
- Kleider, Alexander (Director) and Michel, Daniela (Director). (2009). When the Mountain Meets its Shadow [Documentary]. Germany: DOK-WERK film cooperative.
- No Land! No House! No Vote! Voices from Symphony Way, by the Symphony Way Pavement Dwellers (2011)
- Tin Town – Documentary
