= Poor People's World Cup =

South African community football league

The Poor People's World Cup was an event organised by a South African social movement in response to the 2010 FIFA World Cup in South Africa.

The event was created by the Western Cape Anti-Eviction Campaign who believed that the World Cup has had a negative impact on poor communities in Cape Town, via evictions, relocations, and not being allowed to trade near the new football stadiums.

The event consisted of 36 teams from poor South African communities, and each represents an official World Cup country. The first game was on 13 June 2010.
