= Landlessness =

Economic concept

Landlessness is the quality or state of being without land, without access to land, or without having private ownership of land. Although overlapping considerably, landlessness is not a necessary condition of poverty. In modern capitalist societies, individuals may not necessarily privately own land yet still possess the capital to obtain an excess of what is necessary to sustain themselves, such as wealthy individuals who rent expensive high-rise apartments in major urban centers. As such, landlessness may not exist as an immediate threat to their survival or quality of life. This minority of landless individuals as sometimes been referred to as the "landless rich." However, for the majority of landless people, including the urban poor and those displaced into conditions of rural-to-urban migration, their condition of landlessness is also one of impoverishment, being without the capital to meet their basic necessities nor the land to grow their own food, keep animals, or sustain themselves. During times of economic prosperity in modern capitalist societies, the liabilities of landlessness may not be noticeable, especially to the wealthy, but during times of economic failure and rising unemployment, the liabilities of landlessness become more visible.

Landlessness is often address by redistributive land reforms which transfer agricultural land ownership from large private landowners to small farmers and people without any landholdings. This also involves the redistribution of wealth and political power that comes from owning large swathes of land.

== Landlessness in rural economies ==
=== Characteristics of landlessness in rural economies ===
Landlessness can be defined as the lack of access to or absence of adequate land to provide basic needs and fulfillment of human rights. A rural household is generally categorized as landless if it does not have land outside of residential or rented land. Landlessness is usually also a manifestation of other societal problems such as poverty, food insecurity, powerlessness, and inequality.

In agrarian economies, land is the primary source of income and employment for rural populations. As such, ownership of and access to land is a major determinant of "economic solvency, social power structure, and hierarchy" and it is considered to be the most important contributor to poverty for rural households. The rural landless are separated from means of production and become dependent on non-agricultural sources of labor which are often inconsistent and offer insufficiently low wages. As a result, they continue to be unable to access adequate land due to the lack of social and fiscal power and are confined to the poorest segments of society.

=== Causes of landlessness in rural economies ===
There are two main assumptions associated with the rapid rise of landlessness in rural economies over the past few decades. The first assumption stipulates that certain socio-economic circumstances such as low agricultural productivity, inequality, and colonialism would exacerbate peasant class differentiation. Therefore, poverty and landlessness increase in tandem. Low agricultural productivity is a concern especially in areas with land scarcity such as in certain parts of Asia, where the lower the productivity of land, the more land is required to provide an adequate level of living. Inequitable social structures often characterize rural landscapes in underdeveloped countries. Corporate and commercial actors control large tracts of productive land, increasing the severity of landlessness and near-landlessness. This polarization continues to increase, exacerbating inequality and conflict. Colonialism has direct consequences on landlessness, where it undermines existing social and organizational structures and generally enables exploitative land management practices. The second assumption stipulates that rising landlessness signifies a divergence from farming and the emergence of non-agricultural economic opportunities. In this scenario, farming households can choose to sell their land to explore new opportunities, in which case rising landlessness can be associated with falling poverty.

=== Grassroots activism ===
Various grassroots movements have emerged in response to escalating corruption, discrimination, and exploitative labor conditions. Notable movements and organizations include the Landless People's Movement in South Africa, the Landless Workers' Movement in Brazil, the 2020–2021 Indian farmers' protest, and the Asian Peasant Coalition.

==== Day of the Landless ====
The Day of the Landless on March 29 is inaugurated by the Asian Peasant Coalition to raise awareness and advocate for land rights for rural workers across Asia.

== Indigenous landlessness ==
Landlessness has since been identified as "one of the main causes of poverty amongst Indigenous peoples, particularly Indigenous women, making land rights critical to the alleviation of Indigenous poverty." Indigenous people throughout the world have been displaced from their traditional lands as a result of settler colonialism, corporate imperialism, war, logging and mining, and even land conservation efforts, which has increased their social marginalization, lack of access to basic social services, and chronic poverty. According to colonial logics, Indigenous people were not able to exercise their territorial sovereignty. Indigenous peoples in the United States without a territory or a reservation, such as the Oklahoma Choctaws and the Winnemem Wintu, are nations without a land base, which affects their ability to assert sovereignty and self-determination while also leading directly to the loss of language, culture, and traditions. Māori in New Zealand have recognized how Indigenous homelessness is inextricably connected with landlessness as a result of the colonial acquisition of Indigenous resources to support European settlement.
