= Umoja Village =

Shantytown in Miami, Florida

Coordinates: 25.8320°N 80.2246°W

The Umoja Village shantytown was founded on October 23, 2006, in the Liberty City section of Miami, Florida, in response to gentrification and a lack of low-income housing in Miami. The name Umoja is Swahili for "unity", hence "Unity Village".

After months of planning, a group calling itself Take Back the Land seized control of a vacant lot on the corner of 62nd St. and NW 17th Ave. The lot had been vacant for about eight years after low-income housing there was demolished by the City of Miami. Take Back the Land erected several tents and then built wood-frame shanties in order to provide housing for otherwise homeless people in the area.

Police, City of Miami and Miami-Dade County officials were unable to evict the residents or organizers due to the landmark 1996 Pottinger Settlement. After years of arresting homeless people, the city of Miami was sued by the Miami ACLU; they eventually settled. In the settlement, the city agreed that homeless people could not be arrested if they met the following criteria:

1. The individual is homeless;
2. the individual is situated on public land;
3. there are no beds available at homeless shelters in the city; and
4. the individual is engaged in "life sustaining conduct," such as eating, sleeping, bathing, "responding to calls of nature," congregating and building "temporary structures" to protect oneself from the elements.

Take Back the Land used the legal settlement to build a shantytown in Miami. By the end of December, the Village housed approximately 50 otherwise homeless people, and made the news in The Miami Herald, the Sun-Sentinel, the Los Angeles Times, Time.com and The New York Times, as well as a number of documentaries and blogs.

Residents ran the Village, voting to build, distribute donations, move in new residents and evict others. Umoja Village enjoyed broad support in the community, and, therefore, was able to successfully repel numerous attempts by government officials to evict them.

== Land struggle ==
Take Back the Land organizer Max Rameau, of the Center for Pan-African Development, argued that the Umoja Village was not just about gentrification, but was a full "land struggle," in the mold of Brazil's MST (the Landless Workers' Movement) and similar movements in South Africa. As an advocate of Pan-Africanism, Rameau asserted black people should control the land in the black community, as manifested by Umoja Village.

The village itself was built with the help of local white and Latino anarchists, operating under the black political leadership of Take Back the Land.

== The fire ==
On April 23, 2007, Umoja Village celebrated six months since its founding by announcing several building campaigns, including demanding legal rights to the land from the City of Miami, and other plans to acquire land and build low-income housing. However on the day the first new construction was to start, Umoja Village burned to the ground. There were no casualties or injuries. Miami police arrested 11 residents and activists for attempting to remain on the land, and the City erected a barbed wire fence around the property that same day.

To avoid protests, the City offered Take Back the Land the property, in order to build low-income housing before reneging on the offer under pressure from local power brokers and lobbyists. On October 23, 2007, Take Back the Land announced it had identified vacant public and private foreclosed homes and had moved families into some of those homes, in a move it calls "liberating" housing. As of February 2008, Take Back the Land had a waiting list of 14 families waiting to move into one of those homes.

In February 2008, Max Rameau released a book detailing the experience, entitled Take Back the Land: Land, Gentrification and the Umoja Village Shantytown.
