= Movement for Justice in el Barrio =

Community organization in New York City

Movement for Justice in El Barrio is a community organization based in East Harlem, New York City that is a reaction to, and organizes against, gentrification in the neighborhood.

== Organisational profile ==
The Movement defines itself as follows:

We are Movement for Justice in El Barrio. We are part of the simple and humble community that lives in El Barrio. We fight for dignity and against displacement. We fight for the liberation of women, immigrants, gays, lesbians, the transgender community, people of color, and indigenous communities.

Movement for Justice in El Barrio was founded by immigrants and low-income people living in East Harlem, New York City. It is part of the fight against the effects of neoliberalism and discrimination in all of its forms and operates on a commitment to the ideals of self-determination, autonomy and participatory democracy. It has protested, marched, gone to court and fought back against the actions of multinational corporations such as the Dawnay Day Group, landlords that they perceive to be 'abusive and greedy', and the city institutions that are agents of the gentrification of their neighborhood. The group operates outside political parties and party politics. They have taken a particularly strong stance against council member Melissa Mark-Viverito for her support of gentrification in the area.

Movement for Justice in El Barrio operates on a commitment to self-determination, autonomy, and participatory democracy.

== Accomplishments ==
- Named "Best Power to the People Movement in NYC" by the Village Voice.
- Prevented gentrification of 47 apartment buildings in East Harlem by the UK-based Dawnay Day Group

== See also ==
- Abahlali baseMjondolo in South Africa
- The Bhumi Uchhed Pratirodh Committee in India
- The EZLN in Mexico
- Fanmi Lavalas in Haiti
- The Homeless Workers' Movement in Brazil
- The Landless Peoples Movement in South Africa
- The Landless Workers' Movement in Brazil
- Narmada Bachao Andolan in India
- The Western Cape Anti-Eviction Campaign in South Africa
- The New York Foundation
