= Eldorado do Carajás massacre =

Killing of landless farmers by police in Brazil in 1996

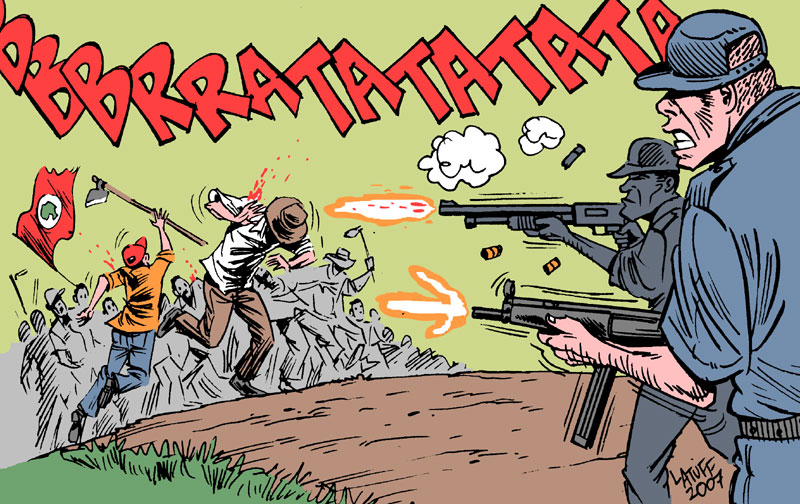
- Drawing by political cartoonist Carlos Latuff depicting the massacre
- Native name: Massacre de Eldorado do Carajás
- English name: Eldorado do Carajás massacre
- Date: April 17, 1996
- Location: Highway PA-150, Eldorado do Carajás, Pará, Brazil
- Type: Massacre
- Cause: Police brutality
- Target: Peaceful protesters of the Movimento dos Trabalhadores Rurais Sem Terra (MST)
- Perpetrator: Brazilian military police
- Deaths: 21
- Injuries: 69
- Sentence: May 7, 2012, two commanders jailed

The Eldorado do Carajás massacre (Portuguese pronunciation: [mɐˈsakɾi dʒi ɛwdoˈɾadu du kɐɾɐˈʒas]) was the mass killing of 21 landless farmers who were taking part in a peaceful protest. They were shot by military police on April 17, 1996, in the southern region of the Pará state, Brazil.

== Background ==
During the 1970s, the military dictatorship in Brazil allowed for greater extraction in the Amazon rainforest, attracting tens of thousands of landless workers to migrate to Pará to work in mines and plantations. The Movimento dos Trabalhadores Rurais Sem Terra (Landless Workers Movement, or MST) began to organize in Pará in 1989. The organization frequently held large land occupations to call for land reform.

== Massacre ==
In April 1996, 3,500 landless families affiliated with the MST occupied the Macaxeira fazenda, calling for land reform. 1,500 farmers began to march towards Belém on highway PA-150 in the Eldorado do Carajás municipality. Pará governor Almir Gabriel ordered the Military Police to clear the highway "no matter what" and Secretary of Public Security Paulo Sette Câmara ordered police to "clear the people [..] at any cost". Around 4:00 p.m. on April 17, 1996, 155 military police arrived at the MST blockade and began kettling the crowd. Officers fired tear gas into the crowd and shot machine guns into the air. The crowd responded by throwing sticks and stones before the police opened fire onto the crowd.

19 members of the MST were shot dead, and 69 more injured. Two more later died from their injuries. Twelve of the killed were found to be hacked by sickles and machetes. Following the killings, police patrolled nearby hospitals in search of injured protestors and shot one wounded person. Police also looted corpses and the encampment for valuables.

== Aftermath ==
The massacre was filmed by a local TV crew and quickly made international news. President Fernando Henrique Cardoso called the killing "an embarrassment for the country." It drew formal condemnation from Portugal, France, Germany, and the Vatican.

=== Conviction ===
In June 2002, 127 military police and 19 higher ranking officers went on trial for the killing. Colonel Mario Pantoja and Major José Maria Oliveira were convicted, but the rest of the officers were absolved following a trial "riddled with irregularities". Amnesty International stated that the case was "emblematic of the culture of impunity in Pará", citing "inept police investigation, woefully inadequate forensic research, and the failure to offer protection to witnesses who received threats".

On May 7, 2012, sixteen years after the event, the two commanders of the Eldorado do Carajas massacre, in which 19 people were killed, were finally jailed.

== Legacy ==
Mass killings of protestors in Brazil continued to occur after the massacre, with 51 mass killings and 1,501 killed from 1985 to 2020.

The President of the Brazilian Chamber of Deputies, Arlindo Chinaglia, gave a speech to remember the horror of the Massacre de Eldorado de Carajás in Brasília on 17 April 2008, to mark the 12th year after the massacre. In 2018, presidential candidate Jair Bolsonaro gave a speech at the site of the massacre calling the MST "scoundrels and vagabonds" and stating that the police acted in self defense. On April 17, 2026, 2,000 landless workers led a march along the BR-324 highway in Salvador in remembrance of the 30th anniversary of the massacre.

=== In the arts ===
Swiss theatre director and political activist Milo Rau, then artistic director of NTGent in Belgium, travelled with his team to Pará, In collaboration with the MST, they created a performance called Antigone in the Amazon, an allegorical play about the impact of the modern state and impact on traditional land rights, which causes huge displacements of people and devastation of culture. Scenes were filmed in Brazil, and the performance combines storytelling, music, film, and theatre, to illustrate its themes of political protest, state brutality, and heroism, based on Sophocles' play Antigone; a Greek tragedy transposed to a modern village in the Amazon. There is filmed re-enactment of the Eldorado do Carajás massacre. The play premiered in May 2023, before going on tour in Europe. The play is performed in several languages, with English subtitles for its 2024 run at the Adelaide Festival in Adelaide, South Australia, in March 2024.

== See also ==
- 1989 Santa Elmira massacre
- Pau D'Arco Massacre (2017)
- List of massacres in Brazil
