= Poor People's Alliance =

South African movement network

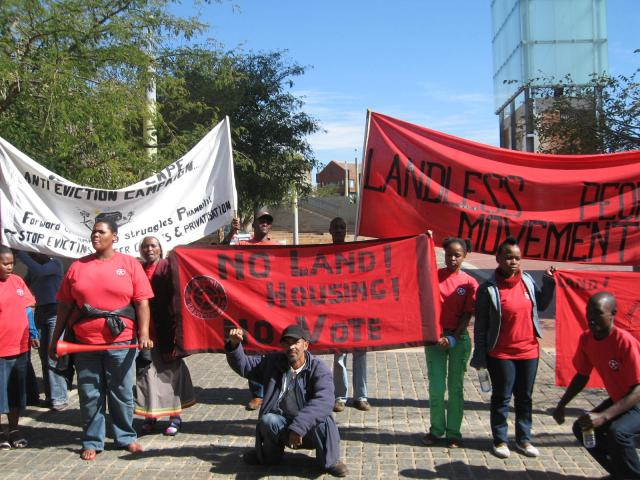
Members of the Poor People's Alliance Outside the Constitutional Court, 14 May 2009

The Poor People's Alliance was a network of radical grassroots movements in South Africa. It was formed in 2008 after the Action Alliance, formed in December 2006, was expanded to include two more organisations. It become defunct following the collapse of two of its affiliated movements, the Western Cape Anti-Eviction Campaign and the Landless People's Movement.

The following organisations were members of the alliance:

1. Abahlali baseMjondolo in the province of KwaZulu-Natal.
2. Abahlali baseMjondolo in the province of the Western Cape.
3. The Landless People's Movement in the province of Gauteng.
4. The Western Cape Anti-Eviction Campaign in the province of the Western Cape.
5. The Rural Network of KwaZulu-Natal.
6. Sikhula Sonke

The Poor People's Alliance refused electoral politics and resolved to boycott the 2009 national elections under the slogan "No Land! No House! No Vote!".

The Poor People's Alliance supported the struggle of the eMacambini Community against mass eviction by Ruwaad Holdings and KwaZulu-Natal Premier S'bu Ndebele and the African National Congress Provincial Government of KwaZulu-Natal.

== International links ==
The Chicago Anti-Eviction Campaign stated that it has been influenced by the Western Cape Anti-Eviction Campaign and the Poor People's Alliance.
