= Eldorado do Carajás =

Coordinates: 6.10389°S 49.355°W

- Municipality
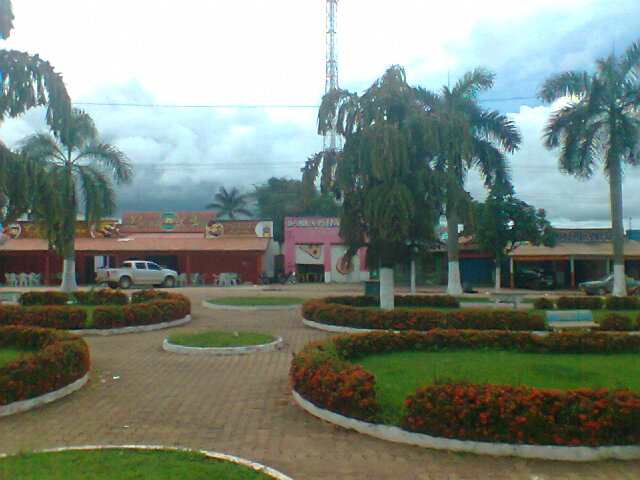

- Flag
- Interactive map of Eldorado do Carajás
- Country: Brazil
- Region: Northern
- State: Pará
- Mesoregion: Sudeste Paraense
- Microregion: Parauapebas

Population (2020)
  - Total: 33,940
- Time zone: UTC−3 (BRT)

Eldorado do Carajás is a municipality in the state of Pará in the Northern region of Brazil, known for the massacre that occurred there, in 1996, when 19 landless peasants were killed by police troops.

== See also ==
- Eldorado do Carajás massacre
- List of municipalities in Pará
