= João Pedro Stédile =

Brazilian political activist and economist

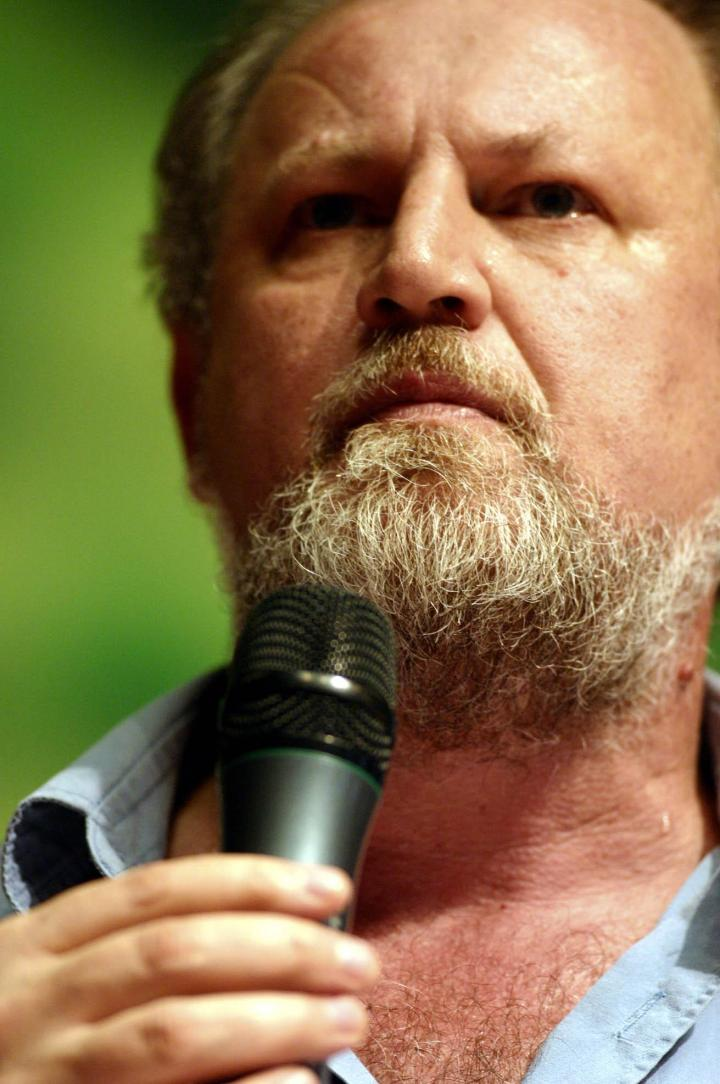
- Born: December 25, 1953 (age 72); Lagoa Vermelha
- Education: Economy at PUCRS with a postgraduate at UNAM
- Occupations: Activist and economist
- Organization: MST
- Known for: Activism for land reform in Brazil

João Pedro Stédile (Brazilian Portuguese: [ʒuˈɐ̃w ˈpedɾu (i)ˈstɛdʒili]; born 25 December 1953) is a Brazilian political Activist and Economist, advocating for land reform in Brazil, being a member of the collective for coordination of the Landless Workers' Movement or MST. MST is a political movement for redistribution of land to end the high concentration of land ownership in Brazil derived from the prevalence of latifundia in the colonial period and the rural flight during the dictatorship period.

Stédile participated in the formation of the MST during the redemocratization period, joining the first National Meeting of the Rural Workers in Paraná in January 1984, being a part of its coordination committee ever since.
