= 1989 Santa Elmira massacre =

Massacre of activists in Brazil

Coordinates: 32.033197°S 52.098614°W

The Santa Elmira massacre was a massacre on activists of the Brazilean Landless Workers' Movement (MST) in Rio Grande do Sul in 1989. In early 1989 a group of the MST that had been resettled in Salto do Jacuí occupied the Santa Elmira ranch. An order to dislodge them was issued, but the MST refused to leave the land. They were forcefully evicted from the land by military forces and small farming aircraft of the União Democrática Ruralista (that dropped tear gas bombs). 19 MST activists were killed by gunfire, 400 were injured and 22 were taken prisoner.

== See also ==
- List of massacres in Brazil
- Eldorado do Carajás massacre
- 2017 Santa Lúcia massacre

== Bibliography ==
- Görgen, Frei Sérgio Antônio. O massacre da fazenda Santa Elmira. Porto Alegre: Novak Multimedia, 2002.
