= Take Back the Land =

Florida based housing movement

Take Back the Land is an American organization based in Miami, Florida, devoted to blocking evictions, and rehousing homeless people in foreclosed houses. Take Back the Land was formed in October 2006 to build the Umoja Village shantytown on a plot of unoccupied land to protest gentrification and a lack of low-income housing in Miami. The group began opening houses in October 2007 and moved six homeless families into vacant homes in 2008. By April 2009, the group had moved 20 families into foreclosed houses. As of November 2008, the group had ten volunteers. Take Back the Land volunteers break into the houses, clean, paint, and make repairs, change the locks, and help move the homeless families in. They provide supplies and furniture and help residents turn on electricity and water. Though the occupations are of contested legality, as of December 2008 local police officers were not intervening, judging it to be the responsibility of house owners to protect their property or request assistance.

== Advocacy ==
The group advocates for changes in governmental housing policy. Max Rameau, the homeless advocate running the program, called it "morally indefensible to have vacant homes sitting there, potentially for years, while you have human beings on the street". Rameau says that the group only moves families into government- or bank-owned properties, and argues that it is not fair for the banks to be receiving government bailouts while keeping these assets.

== Tactics ==
Rameau states that having people occupy the buildings helps the owners by preventing looting and property destruction that he says would likely happen to unoccupied buildings. He also says that the group requires that tenants get electricity and provides solar panels if the electricity does not work. Take Back the Land activists help maintain and clean the yards of the squatted houses, and they give the families cleaning supplies and furniture. The group gains access to unoccupied houses, paints and cleans them, changes the locks, and connects electricity and water. Rameau says each occupation costs the group $200. Take Back the Land instructs tenants of the houses to occupy the houses openly; they enter and leave through the front door, pay for utilities in their own names, and are honest with neighbors. The families live in the houses they occupy until they either save up enough money to afford to pay for housing or are forcibly evicted by police.

The group maintains a waiting list of families who would like to move into foreclosed homes. Rameau says tenants are carefully chosen in order to avoid creating crack houses; drug addicts are rejected, and participants are assessed for their "urgency of need".

According to Rameau, he had approached banks in 2008 with the idea of buying them for a discount price and renting them to homeless people; they seemed interested at first but he says they stopped calling him back after the 2008 federal bailout was announced.

Take Back the Land uses illegal tactics. The group commits trespassing and tenants could be charged with crimes such as vandalism. Rameau says, "there's a disconnect between the need and the law. Being arrested is just one of the potential factors in doing this." The tenants are told that they may be arrested if caught. Take Back the Land has a pro-bono lawyer on standby. Kelly Penton, a spokesperson for the city of Miami, said that the city was not taking action to stop Take Back the Land's activities stating that "it is up to the property owner". As of December 2008, police had not gotten involved.

== Background ==
Take Back the Land was originally formed in 2006 as an anti-gentrification organization inspired by the Landless Workers' Movement in Brazil and the Western Cape Anti-Eviction Campaign in South Africa. The group built the Umoja Village in Miami in 2006, a shantytown on an undeveloped lot in support of the "black community's right to own land". Fifty homeless people lived in the village. After the village burned down in April 2007, the group moved 14 of the ex-residents into a warehouse. Max Rameau released a book detailing the experience entitled Take Back the Land: Land, Gentrification and the Umoja Village Shantytown.

Partly due to overbuilding and speculation, Florida, and particularly Miami, have been affected by the housing crisis in the late 2000s recession. In September 2008, Florida had the second highest rate of foreclosures in the country.

Take Back the Land moved the first family into an unoccupied house on October 22, 2007. By November 2008, it had opened up six houses, and by April 2009, the group had moved 20 families into foreclosed homes.
