= Homeless Workers' Movement =

Workers Movement in Brazil

MTST poster for the Quilombo das Guerreiras Occupation

The Homeless Workers Movement (Portuguese: Movimento dos Trabalhadores Sem Teto, MTST) is a social movement in Brazil. It originated from the Movimento dos Trabalhadores Rurais Sem Terra (English: Landless Rural Workers' Movement). Although the MTST can trace its first urban activism efforts to the occupation of Campinas in São Paulo during the 1997 National People's March, this intervention was organized within the Landless Rural Worker's Rural Movement (MST) structure. The first proper occupation as a new sociopolitical actor, distinct from the MST, took place in Guarulhos in 2002. It was named after Anita Garibaldi, considered to be a radical social reformer during her lifetime.

== Struggle for housing ==
Through direct confrontation and negotiation with the local, state or the federal government, MTST attempts to reduce Brazil's housing deficit by staging squatters' occupations in unoccupied plots marked as Special Social Interest Zones (Zonas Especiais de Interesse Social) that owe property taxes. Determining an exact number on the housing shortage in Brazil is a difficult task to achieve, but several estimates have been provided. In 2019, The Guardian reported 7.7 million while Habitat for Humanity places the number between 6–8 million. By resisting attempts by local governments to evict the poor and negotiating for their conversion into low-income housing, MTST has challenged the neoliberal model. In fact, at the national level, previous governments have undermined affordable housing projects, including the emblematic Minha Casa, Minha Vida, but have failed at doing so due to MTST interventions.

According to MTST, there are over 5 million housing units available in abandoned buildings in Brazil. São Paulo, for example, was short of housing units in the 500,000 – 700,000 range as of 2017. As noted before, MTST originally emerged as a faction within MST and focuses on urban reform. Although fully autonomous, the organization has a strategic alliance with MST and also works closely with other Brazilian urban social movements such as the União Nacional de Moradia Popular (English: National Low-income Housing Union) and the Centro dos Movimentos Populares (English: Center of Popular Social Movements).

== Political affiliation ==
While the movement is politically heterogeneous, in 2017, MTST's leader Guilherme Boulos ran as a presidential candidate representing the Socialism and Liberty Party (PSOL), which signals an ideological cohesion with socialist principles and proposals. On one side, there are branches which resemble a Leninist political party in terms of structure and hierarchy, and on the other side, branches which are clearly committed to goals such as self-management, a characteristic within squatting communities. Squatting is a key practice within MTST and, as such, does not solely have political repercussions, but ecological ones as well. In this regard, the occupation of abandoned buildings and homes, overlaps with decroissance or degrowth. Over time, MTST has developed a more nuanced and multi-dimensional counter-hegemonic stance on class struggle within the Brazilian government's embrace of neoliberalism. For example, MTST's State Collective of Ceará pivots on the concept of “dignified housing” to advocate for other related issues, such as infrastructure for social wellbeing, education, health care, and transportation.

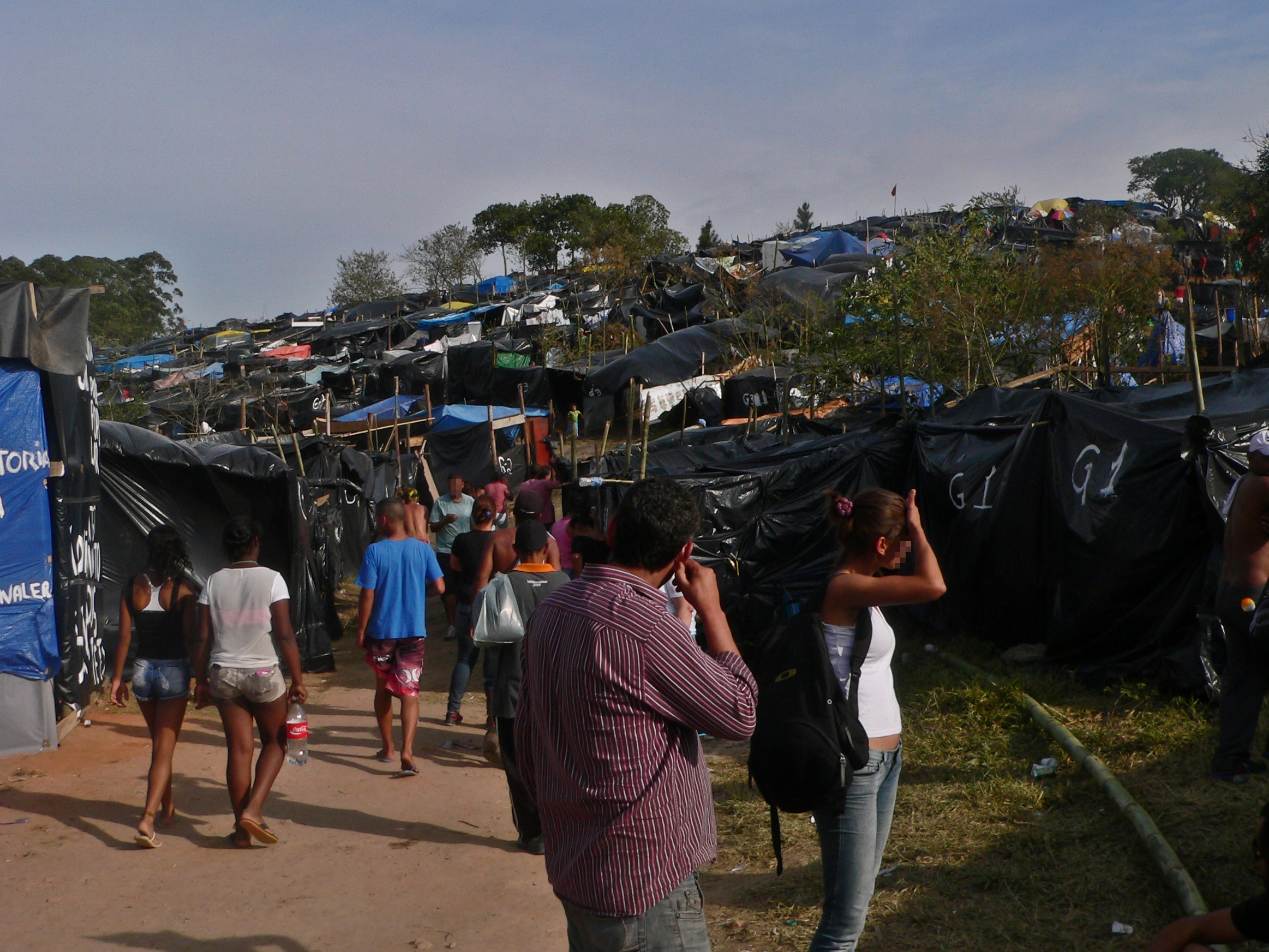
An occupation by MTST in Carapicuíba, São Paulo

== History ==
MTST was created within the MST in order to ensure representation of land reform advocacy in the urban sphere. According to the João Pinto foundation and the Ministry of Cities, there are six million Brazilian families that are living in undignified conditions. The MTST justifies its activities based on the 1988 constitution, which guarantees property and dignified social living conditions as social rights. Brazilian cities are often segregated geographically between the wealthy area and the "periferia" which translates to periphery. Urban planning and increasing rents has contributed to this segregation, forcing people in difficult economic circumstances to move to the outskirts of the town.

== See also ==
- Abahlali baseMjondolo in South Africa
- The Landless Workers' Movement in Brazil
- The Western Cape Anti-Eviction Campaign in South Africa
