= Bhumi Uchhed Pratirodh Committee =

Organization

Bhumi Uchhed Pratirodh Committee ('Committee against Land Evictions') was an organisation in West Bengal, India, formed to oppose the establishment of a proposed Special Economic Zone (SEZ) in the rural area of Nandigram.

== History ==
It formed an important role in resisting land-acquisitions in the following Nandigram violence. BUPC was set up on January 5, 2007, through the merger of three existing anti-SEZ initiatives; Krishak Uchchhed Birodhi O Jonoswartho Roksha Committee (Committee Against Eviction of Peasants and to Save People's Interest', was formed in August 2006 by Socialist Unity Centre of India (SUCI) and Indian National Congress), supported by groups of Naxalites, Bharatiya Janata Party, Krisi Jami Raksha Committee ('Committee to Save Farmland', founded by Trinamool Congress) and Gana Unnoyon O Jana Odhikar Sangram Samity ('Association for the Struggle of Mass 'Development and People's Right', founded by Jamiat Ulema-e-Hind and Provisional Central Committee, Communist Party of India (Marxist–Leninist)). Sisir Adhikary, a Trinamool Congress MLA, was the convenor of BUPC. The Joint Secretary of the organization was Nanda Patra, a Socialist Unity Centre of India (SUCI) leader.
