= Landless Workers' Movement =

Social movement for land reform in Brazil

- Movimento dos Trabalhadores Rurais Sem Terra
- Formation: January 1984
- Legal status: Social movement
- Purpose: Agrarian land reform
- Services: Land reform movement, squatting (primary); basic healthcare and education (secondary)
- Members: 1,500,000
- Leader: João Pedro Stédile
- Main organ: Núcleo de Base
- Parent organization: National Coordination Body
- Website: https://mst.org.br

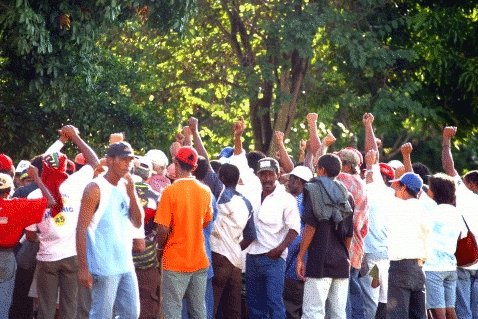
MST supporters in Brazil.

The Landless Workers' Movement (Portuguese: Movimento dos Trabalhadores Rurais Sem Terra, MST) is a social movement in Brazil aimed at land reform. Inspired by Marxism, it is the largest such movement in Latin America, with an estimated informal membership of 1.5 million across 23 of Brazil's 26 states.

MST defines its goals as access to the land for poor workers through land reform in Brazil, and activism around social issues that make land ownership more difficult to achieve, such as unequal income distribution, racism, sexism, and media monopolies. MST strives to achieve a self-sustainable way of life for the rural poor.

The MST differs from previous land reform movements in its single-issue focus; land reform for them is a self-justifying cause. The organization maintains that it is legally justified in occupying unproductive land, pointing to the most recent Constitution of Brazil (1988), which contains a passage saying that land must fulfill a social function (Article 5, XXIII). The MST also notes, based on 1996 census statistics, that a mere 3% of the population owns two-thirds of all arable land in Brazil.

In 1991, MST received the Right Livelihood Award "for winning land for landless families, and helping them to farm it sustainably."

== Land reform before the 1988 Constitution ==
Land reform has a long history in Brazil, and the concept predates the MST. In the mid-20th century, Brazilian leftists reached a consensus that the democratization and widespread actual exercise of political rights would require land reform. Brazilian political elites actively opposed land reform initiatives, which they felt threatened their social and political status. Political leaders of the rural poor then attempted to achieve land reform from below, through grassroots action. MST broke new ground by tackling land reform itself, by "breaking...dependent relations with parties, governments, and other institutions," and framing the issue in purely political terms, rather than social, ethical, or religious ones.

The first statute to regulate land ownership in Brazil after its independence, Law 601 or Lei de Terras (Landed Property Act), took effect 18 September 1850. A colonial administration, based on Portuguese feudal law, had previously considered property ownership to stem from royal grants (sesmarias), and were passed through primogeniture (morgadio). In the independent Brazilian state, the default means of acquiring land was through purchase, from either the state or a previous private owner. This law strongly limited squatter's rights, and favoured the historic concentration of land ownership, which became a hallmark of modern Brazilian social history. The Lei de Terras left in place the colonial practice of favoring of large landholdings created by mammoth land grants to well-placed people, which were usually worked by enslaved people.

Continuing the policy favored economies of scale, given the limited number of landowners, but simultaneously made it difficult for small planters and peasants to obtain the land needed to practice subsistence agriculture and small-scale farming.

The consolidation of land ownership into just a few hands had ties to the advent of capitalism in Brazil, and opposition and insurrection in the 19th and early 20th century (for example, the Canudos War in the 1890s, and the Contestado War in the 1910s) idealized older forms of property, and revitalized ideologies centered on a fabled millenarian return to an earlier, pre-bourgeois social order. Advocated by groups led by rogue messianic religious leaders outside the established Catholic hierarchy, these ideologies seemed heretical and revolutionary. Some leftist historians, following the tracks of the groundbreaking 1963 work by journalist Rui Facó (Cangaceiros e Fanáticos), tend to conflate early 20th-century banditry in northeastern Brazil (cangaço) with messianism as a kind of social banditry, a protest against such social inequalities as the uneven distribution of land assets. This theory developed independently in English-speaking academia around Eric Hobsbawn's 1959 work Primitive Rebels. It was criticized for its unspecific definition of "social movement," but also praised for melding political and religious movements, previously separately examined. This blend was later the basis for the MST's emergence.

Both messianism and cangaço disappeared in the late 1930s, but in the 1940s and '50s, additional peasant resistance broke out to evictions and land grabbing by powerful ranchers:

- Teófilo Otoni, Minas Gerais, in 1948
- Porecatu, Paraná, in 1951
- Southwest Paraná, in 1957
- Trombas and Goiás, 1952–1958

These local affairs, however, were repressed or settled locally, and did not give rise to an ideology. Policy makers and scholars across the political spectrum believed that it was an objective economic necessity to permit the end of Brazilian rural society through mechanized agrobusiness and forced urbanization. The left, in particular, felt that the technologically backward, feudal latifundia impeded both economic modernization and democratization.

During the 1960s, various groups attempted land reform through the legal system, beginning with the peasant leagues (Ligas Camponesas) in northeastern Brazil, which opposed the evictions of tenant farmers land, and the transformation of plantations into cattle ranches. These groups questioned the existing distribution of land ownership through a rational appeal to the social function of property.

Despite the efforts of these groups, land ownership continued to concentrate, and Brazil to this day has had a highly dynamic and robust agricultural business sector at the price of extensive dislocation of the rural poor. MST questioned the scope of the benefits from the alleged efficiency of the change, given that since 1850, Brazilian land development had been concerned with the interests of a single class—the rural bourgeoisie. While the MST frames its policies in socio-economic terms, it still points to Canudos and its alleged millenarism to legitimize its existence, and to develop a powerful mystique of its own.

A great deal of the early organizing in the MST came from Catholic communities. Much of MST ideology and practice come from a social doctrine of the Catholic Church: that private property should serve a social function. This principle developed during the 19th century, and became Catholic doctrine with Pope Leo XIII's Rerum novarum encyclical, promulgated on the eve of the 1964 military coup (golpe militar). This doctrine was evoked by President João Goulart at a rally in Rio de Janeiro, at which he offered a blueprint for political and social reforms, and proposed expropriation of estates larger than 600 hectares in areas near federal facilities, such as roads, railroads, reservoirs, and sanitation works; these ideas triggered a strong conservative backlash, and led to Goulart's loss of power. Nevertheless, the Brazilian Catholic hierarchy formally acknowledged the principle in 1980.

In Brazilian constitutional history, land reform—understood in terms of public management of natural resources—was first explicitly mentioned as a guiding principle of government in the 1967 constitution, which sought to institutionalize an authoritarian consensus after the 1964 coup. The military dictatorship intended to use land reform policy to develop a buffer of conservative small farmers between latifundia owners and the rural proletariat. In 1969, at the most repressive point of the dictatorship, the 1967 constitution was amended via a decree (ato institucional) by a junta that held interim power during the final illness of president Arthur da Costa e Silva, and authorized government compensation for property expropriated for land reform. This compensation would be made in government bonds rather than cash, previously the only legal practice (Art. 157, §1, as amended by Institutional Act No. 9, 1969).

== Land reform and the 1988 Constitution ==
The Constitution passed in 1988 required that "property shall serve its social function" and that the government should "expropriate for the purpose of agrarian reform, rural property that is not performing its social function."

Under Article 186 of the Constitution, a social function is performed when rural property simultaneously meets the following requirements:

- Rational and adequate use.
- Adequate use of available natural resources, and preservation of the environment.
- Compliance with the provisions which regulate labor relations.
- Development uses which favor the well-being of owners and workers.

Since the criteria are vague and not objectively defined, the social interest principle was seen as a mixed blessing, but accepted in general. Landowners have lobbied against the principle since 1985 through the landowners' organization, União Democrática Ruralista (Democratic Union of Rural People, or UDR), whose rise and organization parallels that of the MST. Although it avowedly dissolved itself in the early 1990s, some believe it persists in informal regional ties between landowners. UDR lobbying over the constitutional text is believed to have watered down concrete enforcement of the "social interest" principle.

One Brazilian law handbook argues that land reform, as understood in the 1988 Constitution, is a concept made up of various "compromises" on which constitutional law has consistently evaded taking a clear stance, and so one could argue either for or against the MST without leaving the framework of the Constitution. The lack of clear government commitment to land reform precludes the MST engaging in public-interest litigation, so concrete proceedings for land reform are left to the initiative of the groups concerned, through onerous and time-consuming legal proceedings. Given "the highly problematic and ideologically driven nature of the Brazilian justice system," all parties have an incentive to resort to more informal methods: "while the large landowners try to evacuate squatters from their land, squatters might use violence to force institutional intervention favoring them with the land expropriation afterwards ... violence is mandatory for both sides to achieve their goals." These tactics raise controversy about the legality of the MST's actions, since it tries to ensure social justice unilaterally.

The MST identifies rural land it believes to be unproductive and that does not meet its social function, then occupies the land, only afterwards moving to ascertain the legality of the occupation. The MST is represented in these activities by public interest legal counsel, including their own lawyers, sons and daughters of MST families, and organizations, such as Terra de Direitos, a human rights organization co-founded by Darci Frigo, the 2001 Robert F. Kennedy Memorial Human Rights Award Laureate. The courts might eventually issue a warrant for eviction, requiring the occupier families to leave, or they might deny the landowner's petition, and allow the families to stay provisionally, and engage in subsistence farming until the federal agency responsible for agrarian reform, Brazil's National Institute for Colonization and Agrarian Reform (INCRA), determines whether occupied property had indeed been unproductive. The MST's legal activity bases itself on the idea that property rights are in a continuous process of social construction, so litigation and seeking to strike sympathy among the judiciary is essential to MST's legitimacy.

Traditionally, Brazilian courts side with landowners, and file charges against MST members some call "frivolous and bizarre." For instance, in a 2004 land occupation in Pernambuco, a judge issued arrest warrants for MST members, and described them as highly dangerous criminals. Nevertheless, many individual judges have shown themselves sympathetic. Brazilian higher courts have usually regarded the MST with reserve: in February 2009, for instance, the then-president of the Brazilian Supreme Court (STF), Gilmar Mendes, declared the MST engaged in "illicit" activities, opposed granting it public monies, and supported an "adequate" judicial response towards land occupation. The MST leadership has, in turn on various occasions, charged that the STF as a whole is consistently hostile to the movement. In late 2013, it described the court as "lackeying to the ruling class," and "working for years against the working class and social movements." This fraught relationship came to a head on 12 February 2014, when a court session was suspended after an attempted invasion of the court building in Brasília by MST activists, who were met by police firing rubber bullets and tear gas.

== History ==
=== Foundation ===
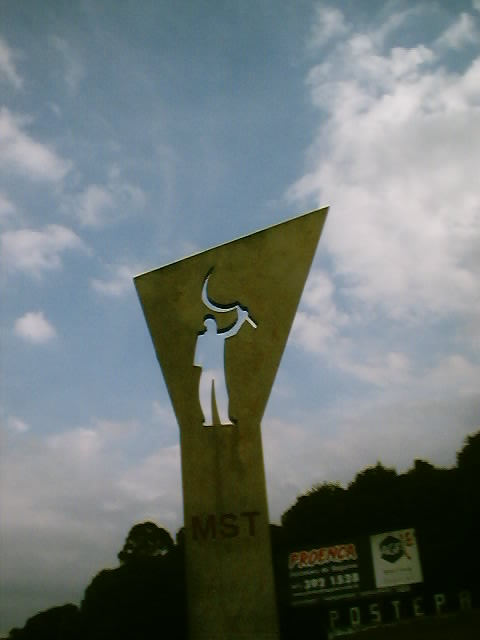
Monument by Oscar Niemeyer dedicated to the MST.

The smashing of the peasant leagues following the 1964 coup opened the way for commercialized agriculture and concentration of land ownership throughout the period of the military dictatorship, and an absolute decline in the rural population during the 1970s. In the mid-1980s, out of 370 million hectares of total farm land, 285 million hectares (77%) were held by latifundia. The re-democratization process in the 1980s, however, allowed grassroots movements to pursue their own interests, rather than those of the state and the ruling classes. The emergence of the MST fits into this framework.

Between late 1980 and early 1981, over 6,000 landless families established an encampment on land located between three unproductive estates in Brazil's southernmost state of Rio Grande do Sul. These families included 600 households expropriated and dislocated in 1974 from nearby Passo Real to make way for construction of a hydroelectric dam. Local mobilization of the Passo Real and Nonoai people had already achieved some land distribution on non-Indian land, followed by demobilization. Those who had not received land under these claims, joined by others, and led by leaders from the existing regional movement, MASTER (Rio Grande do Sul landless farmers' movement), made up the 1980/1981 encampment. The location became known as the Encruzilhada Natalino. With the support of civil society, including the progressive branch of the Catholic Church, the families resisted a blockade imposed by military force. Enforcement of the blockade was entrusted by the government to Army colonel Sebastião Curió, already notorious for his past counter-insurgency efforts against the Araguaia guerrillas.

Curió enforced the blockade ruthlessly; most of the landless refused his offer of resettlement on the Amazonian frontier, and eventually pressured the military government into expropriating nearby lands for agrarian reform. The Encruzilhada Natalino episode set a pattern. Most of subsequent early development of the MST concerned exactly the areas of southern Brazil where, in the absence of an open frontier, an ideological appeal at an alternate foundation for access to the land—other than formal private property—was developed in response to the growing difficulties agribusiness posed for family farming. The MST also developed what became its chief modus operandi: local organizing around the concrete struggles of a specific demographic group.

The MST was officially founded in January 1984, during a National Encounter of landless workers in Cascavel, Paraná, as Brazil's military dictatorship drew to a close. Its founding was strongly connected to Catholic-based organizations, such as the Pastoral Land Commission, which provided support and infrastructure.

During much of the 1980s, the MST faced political competition from the National Confederacy of Agrarian Workers' (CONTAG), heir to the peasant leagues of the 1960s, who sought land reform strictly through legal means, by favoring trade unionism, and striving to wrestle concessions from bosses for rural workers. But the more aggressive tactics of the MST in striving for access to land gave a political legitimacy that soon outshone CONTAG, which limited itself to trade-unionism in the strictest sense, acting until today as a rural branch of the Central Única dos Trabalhadores (CUT). MST eventually all but monopolized political attention as a spokesman for rural workers.

From the 1980s on, the MST has not maintained a monopoly of land occupations, many of which are carried out by a host of grassroots organizations (dissidents from the MST, trade unions, informal coalitions of land workers). However, the MST is by far the most organized group dealing in occupations, and has enough political leverage to turn occupations into formal expropriations for public purposes. In 1995, only 89 of 198 occupations (45%) were organized by the MST, but these included 20,500 (65%) out of the grand total of 31,400 families involved.

=== 1995–2005 Cardoso government ===
Brazil has long history of violent land conflict. During the 1990s, the MST emerged as the most prominent land reform movement in Brazil, and in 1995–1999, led a first wave of occupations which resulted in violence. The MST, landowners, and the government accused each other of the killings, maimings, and property damage.

In the notorious Eldorado de Carajás massacre in 1996, nineteen MST members were gunned down, and another 69 were wounded by police as they blocked a state road in Pará. In 1997 alone, similar confrontations with police and landowners' security details accounted for two dozen internationally acknowledged deaths.

In 2002, the MST occupied the family farm of then-president Fernando Henrique Cardoso in Minas Gerais, a move publicly condemned by Lula, then-leader of the leftist opposition, and other prominent members of the PT. The farm was damaged and looted in the occupation, and a combine harvester, tractor, and several pieces of furniture were destroyed. MST members also drank all the alcohol at the farm. Later, 16 MST leaders were charged with theft, vandalism, trespassing, kidnapping, and resisting arrest.

In 2005, two undercover police officers investigating cargo truck robberies near an MST homestead in Pernambuco were attacked. One was shot dead, and the other tortured; MST was suspected to be involved.

Throughout the early 2000s, the MST occupied functioning facilities owned by large corporations, whose activities it considered at odds with the social function of property. On 8 March 2005, the MST invaded a nursery and a research center in Barra do Ribeiro, 56 km (34.8 mi) from Porto Alegre, both owned by Aracruz Celulose. The MST members held local guards captive while they ripped plants from the ground. MST president João Pedro Stédile commented that MST should oppose not only landowners, but also agrobusinesses that partook in "the project of organization of agriculture by transnational capital allied to capitalist farming"—a model he deemed socially backwards and environmentally harmful. In the words of an anonymous activist: "our struggle is not only to win the land ... we are building a new way of life." The shift had been developing since the movement's 2000 national congress, which focused mainly on the perceived threat of transnational corporations, whether Brazilian or foreign, to both small property in general, and to Brazilian national food sovereignty, especially in the area of intellectual property. In July 2000, this principle was the impetus for MST to mobilize and lead farmers in an attack against a ship loaded with GM maize from Argentina that was docked in Recife. Since 2000, much of the movement's activism consisted in symbolic acts in opposition of multinational corporations, as "a symbol of the intervention politics of the big monopolies operating in Brazil."

A possible reason contributing to the change in strategy might have been the perceived shift in government stances in the late 1990s and early 2000s. The Cardoso government declared that Brazil "had no need" for land reform, that small farms were not competitive, and were unlikely to increase personal incomes in rural areas. He believed that it would be better to create skilled jobs, which would cause the land reform issue to recede into the background. Cardoso denounced the MST's actions as aiming for a return to an archaic, agrarian past, and therefore, in conflict with "modernity"—"one of the enabling myths of the neoliberal discourse."

Cardoso offered lip service to agrarian reform in general, but also described the movement as "a threat to democracy." He compared the MST's demands for subsidized credit, which led to the 1998 occupation of various banks in Paraná, to bank robbery. In a memoir written after he left office, Cardoso expressed sympathy for land reform, stating, "were I not President, I would probably be out marching with them," but also countering, "the image of mobs taking over privately-owned farms would chase away investment, both local and foreign." Although Cardoso himself never branded the MST as terrorists, his Minister of Agricultural Development did, and even hypothesized that the MST invaded Argentina from the north in order to blackmail the Brazilian government into action. In July 1997, Senior General Alberto Cardoso, Cardoso's Chief of Military Household (Chefe da Casa Militar, among other things, a general comptroller over all issues regarding the military and police forces as armed civil servants), expressed concern about participation of MST activists in the then-ongoing police officers' strikes, as a plot to "destabilize" the military.

In terms of concrete measures, Cardoso's government's approach to land reform was divided: while the administration simultaneously acquired land for settlement and increased taxes on unused land, it also forbade public inspection of invaded land—thereby precluding future expropriation, and the disbursement of public funds to people involved in such invasions. Cardoso's main land reform project, supported by a World Bank US$90 million loan, was addressed to individuals who had experience in farming, and a yearly income of up to US$15,000; they were granted a loan of up to US$40,000 if they could associate with other rural producers in order to buy land from a willing landholder. Thus, this programme catered primarily to substantial small farmers, not to the MST's traditional constituency—the rural poor. Cardoso's project, Cédula da Terra ("landcard"), did offer previously landless people the opportunity to buy land from landowners, but in a negotiated process.

In the words of an American scholar, despite its efforts in resettlement, the Cardoso government did not confront the prevailing mode of agricultural production: concentrated, mechanized, latifundia-friendly commodity production—and the resulting injustices. In his own words, what Cardoso could not accept about the MST was what he saw not as a struggle for land reform, but a wider struggle against the capitalist system. Therefore, Cardoso's administration tried to initiate tamer social movements for land reform on purely negotiated terms, such as the Movement of Landless Producers (Movimento dos Agricultores Sem Terra, or MAST), organized on a local basis in the São Paulo State, around the trade union central Syndical Social Democracy (SDS).

By contrast, MST leaders emphasized that their practical activity was a response to the poverty of so many people who had little prospects of productive, continuous work in conventional labor markets. This reality was admitted by President Cardoso in a 1996 interview: "I'm not going to say that my government will be of the excluded, for that it cannot be ... I don't know how many excluded there will be." In 2002, João Pedro Stedile admitted that in plotting the movement's politics, one had to keep in mind "that there are a great many lumpens in the country areas." In Stedile's view, the existence of the large underclass should not be held against the working class character of the movement, because many rural working class had been "absorbed" into the periphery of the urban proletariat. Such a view is shared by some academic authors, who argue that, behind its avowedly "peasant" character, the MST, as far as class politics is concerned, is mostly a semi proletarian movement, consisting of congregations of people trying to eke out a living in the absence of formal wage employment, out of a range of activities across a whole section of the social divisions of labour.

MST somewhat filled the void left by the decline of the organized labor movement in the wake of Cardoso's neoliberal policies. Therefore, the movement took steps to ally with urban struggles, especially those connected to housing. João Pedro Stedile stated that the struggle for land reform would unfold in the countryside, but would be decided in the city, where "political power for structural change" resided.

=== 2005–2010 Lula government and March for Agrarian Reform ===
The Lula government was seen by the MST as a leftist and therefore friendly government, so MST decided to shun occupations of public buildings in favor of actions against private landed states, in a second wave of occupations starting in 2003. However, the Lula government's increasingly conservative positions, including its low profile on land reform, (actually somewhat less than achieved by Cardoso in his first term) impelled the movement to change its stance as early as early 2004, when it again began to occupy public buildings and Banco do Brasil agencies.

In June 2003, the MST occupied the R&D farm of the Monsanto Company in the state of Goiás. On 7 March 2008, a similar action by women activists at another Monsanto facility in Santa Cruz das Palmeiras, São Paulo, destroyed a nursery and an experimental patch of genetically modified maize, slowing ongoing scientific research. MST said they destroyed the facility to protest government support for the extensive use of GMOs supplied by transnational corporations in agriculture. In 2003, Lula authorized the sale and use of GM soybeans, which led MST's Stedile to call him a "transgenic politician." The dominance of transnationals over Brazilian seed production was summed by the fact that the Brazilian hybrid seed industry in the early 2000s was already 82% Monsanto-owned, which the MST saw as detrimental to the development of organic agriculture in spite of the economic benefits, and enabling possible future health hazards similar to intensive use of pesticides. Stedile later called Monsanto one of the ten transnational companies that controlled virtually all international agrarian production and commodity trading. Similarly, in 2006, the MST occupied a research station in Paraná owned by Swiss corporation Syngenta, which had produced GMO contamination near the Iguaçu National Park. After a bitter confrontation over the existence of the station (which included easing of previous restrictions by the Lula government to allow Syngenta to continue GMO research), the premises were transferred to the Paraná state government, and converted into an agroecology research center.

After an exchange of barbs between Lula and Stedile over what Lula saw as an unnecessary radicalization of the movement's demands, the MST decided to call a huge national demonstration. In May 2005, after a two-week, 200-odd kilometer march from the city of Goiânia, nearly 13,000 landless workers arrived in their nation's capital, Brasília. The MST march targeted the U.S. embassy and Brazilian Finance Ministry, rather than President Lula. While thousands of landless carried banners and scythes through the streets, a delegation of 50 held a three-hour meeting with Lula, who donned an MST cap for the cameras. During this session, Lula recommitted to settling 430,000 families by the end of 2006, and to allocating the human and financial resources to accomplish this. He also committed to a range of related reforms, including an increase in the pool of land available for redistribution [Ramos, 2005]. Later, the Lula government would claim to have resettled 381,419 families between 2002 and 2006—a claim disputed by the MST. The movement argued the numbers had been doctored by the inclusion of people already living in areas (national forests and other managed areas of environmental protection, as well as other already existing settlements) where their presence had only been legally acknowledged by the government. The MST also criticised Lula's administration to call mere land redistribution by means of handing out of small plots land as "reform," when it was simply a form of welfarism (assistencialismo) that was unable to change the productive system.

The march was held to demand, among other things, that President Lula implement his own limited agrarian reform plan, rather than spend the project's budget on servicing the national debt [Ramos, 2005]. Several MST leaders met with President Lula da Silva on 18 May 2005—a meeting that had been resisted by Lula since his taking of office. The leaders presented Lula with 16 demands, including economic reform, greater public spending, and public housing. In interviews with Reuters, many of the leaders said they still regarded Lula as an ally, but demanded that he accelerate his promised land reforms. However, in September of that year, João Pedro Stedile declared that, in terms of land reform, Lula's government was "finished." By the end of Lula's first term, it was clear that the MST had decided to act again as a separate movement, irrespective of the government's agenda. As far as the MST was concerned, the greatest gain it received from the Lula government was the non-criminalization of the movement itself; the tough, anti-occupation measures taken by the Cardoso government were left in abeyance, and not enforced. Attempts to officially define the MST as a "terrorist organization" were also opposed by Workers' Party congresspersons. Nevertheless, the Lula government never acted in tandem with the MST, according to a general pattern of keeping organized social movements outside the fostering of the government's agenda.

However, as stated by a German author, the Lula government year after year proposed a blueprint for land reform that was regularly blocked by regional agrarian elites.

Lula's election to the presidency raised the possibility of active government support for land reform, so conservative media increased their efforts to brand the MST's actions as felonies. In May 2005, Veja accused the MST of helping the Primeiro Comando da Capital (PCC), the most powerful prison-gang criminal organization in São Paulo. A police phone tap recording of a conversation between PCC leaders mentioned the MST; one of them said he had "just talked with the leaders of the MST," who would "give instructions" to the gang about the best ways to stage what became the largest protest by prisoners' relatives in Brazilian history. On 18 April 2005, some 3,000 relatives protested prevailing conditions in São Paulo's correctional facilities. The MST "leaders" were not named. No MST activist, real or alleged, took part in the taped conversations. The MST denied any link in a formal written statement, calling the supposed evidence hearsay, and an attempt to criminalize the movement. In the wake of 9/11, Brazilian media tended to describe the MST as "terrorists," lumping it together loosely with various historical and mediatic happenings in keeping with an international post-9/11 trends of relegating any political movement against existing globalization to beyond the pale, and outside the boundaries of permissible political discourse.

The MST assumes its activities are continuously surveilled by military intelligence. Various intelligence organs, Brazilian and foreign, assume a relationship between the MST and various terrorist groups. The MST is regarded as a source of "civil unrest."

In late 2005, a parliamentary inquiry commission, where landowner-friendly congressmen held a majority, classified the MST's activities as terrorism, and the MST itself as a criminal organization. However, its report met no support from the PT members of the commission, and a senator ripped it up before TV cameras, saying that those who voted for it were "accomplices of murder, people who use slave labor, [and] who embezzle land illegally." Nevertheless, based on this report, a bill presented to the Chamber of Deputies in 2006 by Congressman Abelardo Lupion (Democrats- Paraná), proposed making "invading others' property with the end of pressuring the government" a terrorist action, and therefore, a heinous crime. A "heinous" crime in Brazilian law is a felony, designated as such in a 1990 Brazilian law, and those accused of committing them are ineligible for pretrial release.

In April 2006, the MST took over the farm of Suzano Papel e Celulose, a large maker of paper products, in the state of Bahia, because it had more than six square kilometres devoted to eucalyptus growth. Eucalyptus, a non-native plant, has been blamed for environmental degradation in northeastern Brazil, as well as reducing the availability of land for small agricultural production, called by some as "cornering" producers (encurralados pelo eucalipto). In 2011, Veja described such activities as plain theft of eucalyptus wood, quoting an estimate from the state's military police that 3,000 people earned a living in Southern Bahia from theft of wood.

In 2008, a group of public attorneys from Rio Grande do Sul who were working with the state's military police issued a report, charging the MST with collusion with international terrorist groups. The report was used in state courts, according to Amnesty International, to justify eviction orders carried out by the police with "excessive use of force." The group of attorneys made public a previously classified report by the Council of Public Attorneys of Rio Grande do Sul, and asked the state to ban the MST by declaring it an illegal organization.

The report declared further investigation pointless, "as it was public knowledge that the movement and its leadership were guilty of engaging in organized criminality." The report also proposed that where MST activists could "cause electoral disequilibrium," the activists' right to vote be withdrawn by striking them from the voter registry. Declarations issued at the same time by the State Association of Military Policy Commissioned Officers, in an open Red Scare vein, declared the MST "an organized movement, striving at instituting a totalitarian state in our country."

Between 27 September – 7 October 2009, the MST occupied an orange plantation in Borebi, State of São Paulo, owned by orange juice multinational Cutrale. The corporation claimed to have lost R$1.2 million (roughly US$603,000) in damaged equipment, missing pesticide, destroyed crops, and trees cut by MST activists. In response, the MST declared the farm to be government property that was illegally embezzled by Cutrale, and that the occupation was intended to protest this, while the destruction was done by provocateurs. Such questioning of the legality of existing private property by denouncing landowners as holding land in adverse possession was one of the movement's main political tools. The Cutrale plantation, Fazenda S. Henrique, was occupied by the MST four more times until 2013, and the multinational's property rights over it are being contested in court by the Federal Government, who alleges that the farm lands were set aside as part of a 1910 settlement projects for foreign immigrants, rights over it going afterward astray during the following century.

During the same period, the MST also repeatedly blocked highways and railroads, to create calls for public attention to the plight of landless workers.

=== 2010–2018 ===
The MST wholeheartedly declared support for Dilma Rousseff's candidacy, and once elected, she offered the movement very qualified support. In a national broadcast in November 2010, she declared land reform a question "of human rights," that is, a purely humanitarian one. As Lula's chief of staff, she supported economic growth over ecological and land reform concerns. In a radio interview during the campaign, she repeated the old conservative trope that economic growth could make Brazilian land issues recede: "What we are doing is doing away with the real basis for the instabilities of the landless. They are losing reasons to fight." Thus, one author described the MST's endorsement of Rousseff as a choice of the "lesser evil."

State agencies and private individuals continued to violently oppose the movement's activities. On 16 February 2012, eighty families were evicted from an occupation in Alagoas of a farm rented to a sugar mill awash in unpaid debts. According to MST activist Janaina Stronzake, MST assumes that landowners have a hit list of MST leaders. Many have in fact been killed, although some murders were doctored to make them look like accidents. In April 2014, a Global Witness report called Brazil "the most dangerous place to defend rights to land and the environment," with at least 448 people killed between 2002 and 2013 in disputes over environmental rights and access to land. A report for the Catholic Pastoral Land Commission, Land Conflicts in Brazil 2013, estimated that land struggles were involved in 34 murders in Brazil in 2013, and 36 in 2012.

On 16 April 2012, a group of MST activists occupied the headquarters of the Ministry of Agrarian Development in Brasília, as part of the movement's regular "Red April" campaign, a yearly nationwide occupation initiative in honor of the April 1996 Eldorado dos Carajás massacre. Minister Pepe Vargas declared ongoing talks between the government and the MST suspended for the duration of the occupation.

Land activists were dissatisfied with the slowing pace of official land reform projects under the Rousseff government. Fewer families were officially settled in 2011 than in the previous 16 years. Government reaction to the occupation sparked widespread accusations from the PT base that Rousseff had sold out. In a 2012 interview, Stedile admitted that the movement had not benefited from the policies of the PT administrations, since the coalition governments of the PT could not act politically on behalf of land reform.

Both political pundits and activists thought Rousseff's first term was a lean period for land reform, and mainstream media called the MST "tamed" by the two consecutive PT administrations, and drained of mass support by steady economic growth and expanding employment—denying the movement its chief raison d'être. In 2013, MST attempted only 110 occupations. The same year saw another low, with only 159 families resettled. MST National Coordinator João Paulo Rodrigues said that the federal government's reliance on agribusiness exports for procuring hard currency was the main reason the Rousseff administration did not advance land reform, and even went backwards in some cases. The only recent advances in land reform policies had come in programs, such as the National Program for School Meals (PNAE) and Food Catering Plan (PAA), which purchased food from land reform farmers for use at public schools and other government facilities. However, Rodrigues disputed that such programs were "entirely disproportionate to what [was] being offered [in terms of public money, subsidized credits, etc.] to agribusiness." He concluded that the only chance for land reform in Brazil would be a kind of joint venture between small producers and urban working class consumers, as simple land redistribution would be fated to fail, as it had in Venezuela, "where Hugo Chávez stockedpiled seven million hectares of nationalized land property which remained unused for want of proper peasants."

The PT government's base generally felt that the vested interest of agribusiness in setting development policies during the Lula and Rousseff administrations hampered aggressive policies of expropriation and land reform.

In November 2014, amid the radicalization surrounding Rousseff's reelection, an unannounced visit to Brazil by Venezuelan Minister for Communities and Social Movements Elias Jaua led to an information exchange agreement in agro-ecology between the MST and the Venezuelan government. The visit and agreement created tension among the conservatives in the Brazilian Congress; Senator and landowner Ronaldo Caiado described it as "an arrangement between a high-placed representative of a foreign government and an unlawful entity, aimed at building a socialist society," and argued for a clearly more conservative stance on land reform, and therefore, less maneuvering room for the MST. The movement described Caiado's reaction as evidence that "conservative sectors are hostile to any form of grassroots participation [in the political process]."

In an even clearer sign of limited room, Rousseff chose Kátia Abreu, the notorious female landowner, to be a member of her second-term cabinet. However, some have suggested that the ongoing tension between the MST and the PT, far from signaling an impending end, on the contrary, suggested a reconfiguration of the MST, from a single-issue movement to one with a wider focus on political and social emancipation. Since the 1990s, such a tendency has been expressed in the integration of MST with various other grassroots organizations in a network sponsored by progressive Catholics, the CMP (Central de Movimentos Populares, or Union of Popular Movements), through which the MST developed its collaboration with its urban "sister" organization, the MTST.

=== 2018–present ===
MST helped organize the Lula Livre Vigil advocating for the release of Luiz Inácio Lula da Silva from prison.

During the Jair Bolsonaro presidency, MST shifted focus from land occupations to agricultural production and built alliances with urban progressives. MST participated in the 2021 Brazilian protests against the Bolsonaro administration's handling of the COVID-19 pandemic.

Following the re-election of Lula, MST resumed its unused land occupations. In 2023, a parliamentary commission was established to investigate alleged crimes committed by the MST. According to João Pedro Stédile, the commission was an attempt by right-wing forces to destabilize Lula's government. The commission never produced a final report.

== Land ownership ==
Consolidation of land ownership continued unabated. In 2006, according to the property census, the Gini index of land concentration stood at 0.854, while at the beginning of military regime in 1967, it was at 0.836. In other words, concentration of land ownership into just a few hands actually increased. As of 2009, Brazilian economic policy, especially in foreign exchange, relied upon trade surpluses generated by the agricultural exports, so "the correlation of forces moves against agrarian reform." The resumption of sustained general economic growth in the Lula years might have greatly diminished social demand for land reform, especially among the informally and/or under-employed urban workers, who formed most of the movements' later membership. In a 2012 interview, a member of the MST national caucus, Joaquim Pinheiro, declared that the recent increase in welfare spending and employment levels had had a "sobering" influence on Brazilian agrarian activism, but he declared himself in favor of government spending on social programs, adding that the MST feared, however, that people would become "hostages" to such programs. But as of 2006, according to the MST, 150,000 families lived in its encampments, compared to 12,805 families in 1990.

== Organizational structure ==
The MST is organized entirely, from the grassroots level up to the state and national coordinating bodies, into collective units that make decisions through discussion, reflection, and consensus. This non-hierarchical pattern of organization, reflecting liberation theology and Freirean pedagogy, also avoids distinct leadership that can be bought off or assassinated. The basic organizational unit, 10 to 15 families living in an MST encampment settlement, is known as a nucleo de base. A nucleo de base addresses the issues faced by member families, and members elect two representatives, one woman and one man, to represent them at settlement/encampment meetings. These representatives attend regional meetings, and elect regional representatives, who then elect the members of the state coordinating body of the MST, a total of 400 members of state bodies—around 20 per state—and 60 members of the national coordinating body, around 2 per state. Every MST family participates in a nucleo de base, roughly 475,000 families, or 1.5 million people. João Pedro Stédile, economist and author of texts on land reform in Brazil, is a member of the MST's national coordinating body.

The MST is not a political party, and has no formal leadership, other than a dispersed group of some 15 leaders, whose public appearances are scarce. This secrecy minimizes the risk of arrest, and also preserves a grassroots, decentralized organizational model. This is regarded as an important strategy by the MST, in that it allows the movement to maintain an ongoing and direct flow of communication between member-families and their representatives. Coordinators are aware of the realities faced by member-families, and are encouraged to discuss important issues with said families. This organizational blueprint seeks, in a way, to empower people politically by having them acting "in the way they see fit, true to local context." To assist with communication between Coordinators and member-families, and as an attempt to democratize the media, the MST produces the Jornal Sem Terra and the MST Informa.

The structure and goals of the MST has led some authors to consider it a large libertarian socialist, anarchist, or autonomist Marxist organization.

== Ideology ==
The MST is an ideologically eclectic rural movement of hundreds of thousands of landless peasants (and some who live in small cities), striving for land reform in Brazil. Since its inception, the MST has been inspired by liberation theology, Marxism, the Cuban Revolution, and other leftist ideologies. The flexible mix of discourse that includes "marxist concepts, popular religion, communal practices, citizenship principles, and radical democracy" has increased the movement's popular appeal. The radical democratic and anti-hierarchical structure and goals of the MST have led some authors to consider it a large libertarian socialist, anarchist, or autonomist Marxist organization.

The landless say they have found institutional support in the Catholic Church's teachings of social justice and equality, as embodied in the activities of Catholic Base Committees (Comissões Eclesiais de Base, or CEBs), which generally advocate liberation theology and anti-hierarchical social relations. This theology, a radicalized re-reading of the existing social doctrine of the Church, became the basis of the MST's ideology and organizational structure. But during the 1980s, the loss of influence of progressives in the later Catholic Church reduced the closeness of the relationship between the MST and the Church.

MST's anti-hierarchical stance stems from the influence of Paulo Freire. After working with poor communities in the rural Brazilian state of Pernambuco, Freire observed that aspects of traditional classrooms, such as teachers with more power than students, hindered the potential for success of adults in adult literacy programs. He determined that the students' individual abilities to learn and absorb information were severely impeded by their passive role in the classroom. His teachings encouraged activists to break their passive dependence on oppressive social conditions, and become engaged in active modes of behaving and living. In the mid-1980s, the MST created a new infrastructure for the movement, directly guided by liberation theology and Freirian pedagogy. They did not elect leaders, so as to not create hierarchies, and to prevent corrupt leadership from developing.

The MST has widened the scope of their movement. They have invaded the headquarters of public and multinational institutions, and begun to resist the appearance of fields of genetically modified crops, carrying out marches, hunger strikes, and other political actions. The MST cooperates with a number of urban and rural worker movements in other areas of Brazil. The MST also remains in touch with broader international organizations and movements that support and embrace the same cause. The MST includes not only landless workers stricto sensu, or rural workers recently evicted from the land, but also the urban jobless and homeless people who want to make a living by working on the land; thus, its affinity with housing reform and other urban movements. The squatters' movement MTST (Movimento dos Trabalhadores Sem teto – Homeless Workers' Movement) is commonly seen as an offshoot of the MST.

=== Liberation theology and mística ===
As mentioned above, the MST draws ideological inspiration from many conceptual frameworks, both religious and political, with one aspect of this inspiration being the practice of mística. Mística refers to performance or dance conducted in ceremony-like conditions, often with nonverbal components, and carried out with the intention of affirming confidence in desired goals or action. With this in mind, mística can be considered a form of mysticism that exists within a distinctly Latin American context. With regards to the MST, this form of mística underwent a series of changes prior to becoming fully adopted by the organisation as part of its methods and practices. Christian mysticism is often an individual experience, rather than collective and communal, and consequently, the form of mística practiced by the MST differs chiefly in this regard. It is a communal experience (often linked keenly with the emergence of CEBs) that often sees participation from the assembled group, rather than an individual, and this change was brought about by the influence of liberation theology on the MST in the late sixties.

Additionally, as historian Daniela Issa notes, mística is a process by which communities associated with the MST can narrate their own history by reviving a collective memory of the oppressed, often in contexts where censorship and state violence are commonplace. The form of mística associated with the MST also draws on a variety of cultures and origins, with roots in Catholic ritualism, as well as Afro-Brazilian religious practices that had first been introduced after the migration of slavery into Brazil in the 16th century. Not only this, but some contemporary historians have also identified aspects of the MST mística as having originated from Indigenous practices and belief systems. One example of recent demonstrations of mística within the MST is found in the practices of the ceremony at the ten year anniversary of the Eldorado do Carajás massacre. Members engaging in mística carried effigies of the bodies, while singing and chanting, as they converged on a location that symbolised the site of the event.

The MST highly value education, and the organisation is committed to the teachings of Freirian pedagogy, which espouses the process of conscientisation. This commitment to community education forms another aspect of the group's mixture of influences. Popular education and liberation theology are closely linked with the practice of mística within the MST, as CEB's, and the sense of community generated by popular education often form the site of mística—with many members having overlapping interests and participation in each aspect. Such settlements and communities produced by the encampments of the MST actively encourage and sponsor the practice of mística within CEB's present, as a method of reaffirming commitment and dedication to the goals of the group, these goals often being exclusively linked to the political ambitions and campaigns at the time of practice.

=== Ideological foundations of MST's later activism ===
The supposed opposition to capitalist modernity on the part of the movement has led authors to ascertain that the MST activities express, in a way, the decline of a traditional peasantry, and its desire of restoring traditional communal rights. This is what differentiates between the MST and a movement for the preservation of communal rights, such as the Zapatista Army of National Liberation.

However, there are others who assert that instead of expressing the "decline" of the peasantry, the MST, developing as it was in Brazil, a country where agriculture has been tied to commodity production since colonial times, expresses the absence of a proper peasantry, and has, as its social basis, a rural working class that strives to gain a foothold in the field of capitalist production. As remarked by non-specialist foreign onlookers, the MST's tagging of the landless as "rural workers"—i.e. proletarians, in the Marxist sense—appears sometimes more as a purely ideological branding than anything else.

According even to a Leftist scholar like James Petras, the MST is undoubtedly a modernizing social movement, in that its main goal is to convert fallow states into viable units that are able to produce a marketable surplus—"to occupy, resist, and produce", as the movement's own motto goes. It is also not a movement with a clear-cut anti-capitalist stance, as what it seeks is to "create a land reform based on small individual property-owners." As far as its steads are concerned, the movement has adopted a mostly private enterprise-friendly stance: with the monies it has procured, it has financed mechanization, processing enterprises, livestock breeding, as well as granting access to additional credit sources. Some even see the movement's aims as "quite limited," as in practice, it tends to merely provide a chance for some people "to interact with the [ruling] capitalist economy" by means of a kind of "guerrilla capitalism," aimed at ensuring that smaller producers' associations carve a share of the market for agrarian produce against the competition of mammoth agribusiness trusts.

In the view of Marxist authors, like Petras and Veltmeyer, such a stance would reflect the incapacity of a heterogeneous coalition of rural people to engage in a broad, anti-systemic coalition, which would include the urban working classes. Shunning this Marxist paradigm, other authors see in the rhetoric of the MST the reflection of an ideological struggle, not for taking power, but for recognizance, for "reconstituting the diversity of rural Brazil". This struggle for recognizance – despite its being couched in fiery radical rhetoric – is seen by some as "indeed relevant for the democratization of 'rural society', but [it does] not entail political motivations destined to promote ruptures". In even more blunt terms, a recent academic paper asserts that the ideology of the MST, connected as it is in practice with the landless' concrete needs for making out a living in the countryside, is above all an edible ideology. A recent German handbook describes the MST as a mere pressure group, unable to exert actual political power. Other authors, however, maintain that the interest of the MST in maximize its members' everyday participation in the running of their own affairs is enough to describe the movement as "socialist" in a broad sense.

== Education ==
According to the MST, it taught over 50,000 landless workers to read and write between 2002 and 2005. It also runs the Popular University of Social Movements (PUSM) at a campus in Guararema, São Paulo. Also called Florestan Fernandes School (FFS), after Marxist scholar Florestan Fernandes, the school offers secondary school classes in a variety of fields; its first graduating class (2005) of 53 students received degrees in Specialized Rural Education and Development. With the University of Brasília, the government of Venezuela and the NGO Via Campesina, as well as agreements with federal, state and community colleges, it offers classes in pedagogy, history, and agronomy, and technical subjects at different skill levels. The building was constructed with by brigades of volunteers using soil cement bricks made onsite at the school. The late Oscar Niemeyer designed an auditorium and, as of 2014, further sustainable, low environmental impact expansion of the school complex was pending.

The MST formed its education sector in Rio Grande do Sul in 1986, a year after its first national convention. By 2001, about 150,000 children attended 1,200 primary and secondary schools in its settlements and camps. The schools employ 3,800 teachers, many of them MST-trained. The movement has trained 1,200 educators, who run classes for 25,000 young people and adults. It trains primary-school teachers in most states of Brazil, and partners with international agencies such as UNESCO, UNICEF and the Catholic Church. Seven institutions of higher education in different regions provide degree courses in education for MST teachers. Some call MST communal schools markedly better than their conventional counterparts in rural communities, in both quantitative and qualitative terms.

== Media coverage ==
The role of the MST as a grassroots organization running charter schools activity has attracted considerable attention from the Brazilian press, much of it accusatory. Veja, Brazil's largest magazine, known for unrestrained hostility to social movements in general published a profile of two MST schools in Rio Grande do Sul and said the MST was "indoctrinating" children between 7 and 14. Children were also shown what the article called propaganda films, which taught that genetically modified (GMO) products contain "poison", and were advised not to eat margarine that might contain GMO soybean. The Brazilian authorities allegedly had no control over MST schools, and according to the profile they did not follow the mandatory national curriculum set out by the Ministry of Education, which calls for "pluralism of ideas" and "tolerance". "Preaching" "Marxism" in MST schools was analogous to preaching radical Islam tenets in madrassas, the article said.

This was just one episode in a long history of mutual very bitter animosity between Veja and the MST. In 1993, the magazine described the MST as "a peasant organization of Leninist character" and charged its leaders and activists with pretending to be homeless. In February 2009 the magazine opposed public support for the "criminal" activities of the movement and the MST charged the magazine a year later with "vandalizing" both journalism and the truth itself. In 2011, a mention of the MST in Veja called it "a criminal mob". In early 2014, after MST tried to invade the STF building, a Veja columnist described said it was "playing leader to a non-existing cause". This journalistic mud-slinging has justified at least two academic monographs wholly dedicated to it alone.

Overall the relationship of the mainstream media with the MST has been ambiguous: in the 1990s they tended to support land reform as a goal in general, and presented MST in a sympathetic light. For example, between 1996 and 1997 TV Globo broadcast a telenovela O Rei do Gado (The Cattle Baron), in which a beautiful female sem terra played by actress Patricia Pillar falls in love with a male landowner. In the same telenovela, a wake for the fictitious Senator Caxias, killed while defending an MST occupation, offered the opportunity for two real-life senators from the PT, Eduardo Suplicy and Benedita da Silva, to make cameo appearances as themselves praising their fictive colleague's agenda.

The media however tend to disavow what they see as violent methods, especially as the movement gathered strength. It does not outright disavow the movement's struggle for land reform, but Brazilian media moralize: "to deplore the invasion of productive land, the MST's irrationality and lack of responsibility, the ill-using of distributed land parcels and to argue for the existence of alternate peaceful solutions".

== Sustainable agriculture ==
The increased importance of the technicians and experts within the MST has led some sections of the movement to strive to develop and diffuse technology suitable for a model of sustainable agriculture on the land the families farm. Such self-developed technology is seen as a way to turn small producers from consumers into producers of technologies, – and therefore as a hedge against small producers' dependence on chemical inputs and single-crop price fluctuations and a way to preserving natural resources. These efforts are gaining in importance as more movement families gain access to the land. For example, the Chico Mendes Center for Agroecology, founded 15 May 2004 in Ponta Grossa, Paraná, Brazil on land formerly used by the Monsanto Company to grow genetically modified crops, intends to produce organic, native seed to distribute through MST. Various other experiments in reforestation, taming of native species and medicinal uses of plans have been carried out in MST settlements. The MST is the largest producer of organic rice in Latin America.

== See also ==
- Abahlali baseMjondolo in South Africa
- The Bhumi Uchhed Pratirodh Committee in India
- The EZLN in Mexico
- Fanmi Lavalas in Haiti
- The Homeless Workers' Movement in Brazil
- Movement for Justice in el Barrio in the United States of America
- Narmada Bachao Andolan in India
- La Via Campesina
- League of Poor Peasants, an MST splinter group in Brazil
