= Land invasion in South Africa =

Land Occupation

Land invasion in South Africa is the illegal occupation of land with the intention of erecting dwellings or establishing a settlement on it and is an issue that is affecting various municipalities in South Africa especially in the face of increased urbanisation in bigger metropolitans like The City of Cape Town, eThekwini Metropolitan Municipality and the City of Johannesburg Metropolitan Municipality.

== Causes of Land Invasion in South Africa ==
Land invasion is sometimes coordinated acts that have been associated with lawlessness and criminal activity and in some instances, it is said to be politically driven.

According to the Western Cape Department of Human Settlements (previously the Department of Housing), 2003, some of the catalysts for land invasions include;

- Poverty and unemployment
- Past policies that prevented people from obtaining housing in urban areas
- Shortage of legally obtainable housing alternatives
- Faster urbanisation and natural growth than the development of housing in urban areas
- “Jumping the queue”, hoping to be helped to housing sooner
- Shortage of developed land in the vicinity of job opportunities
- Intra-urban migration to better-located land
- Encouragement of unlawful land occupations for political and financial gain
- The perception of unfair housing allocation
- The unlawful sub-letting and vacating of dwellings, leaving subtenants in occupation
- The illegal selling of land before the expiry of the applicable sales restrictions

During the Covid-19 pandemic in South Africa, there was an observed increase in land invasions, whereby people illegally occupied land after experiencing job losses and salary cuts, and were unable to afford rent in formal accommodation but still needed to live close to work.

=== The City of Cape Town ===
The City of Cape Town alone had seen 300 land invasions between January 2020 and September 2020.

In 2009, the city established the Anti-Land Invasion Unit (Cape Town) in an effort to stop people from illegally attempting to occupy land . In 2011 the city stated that the unit demolished about 300 illegally shacks each month. Between July and September 2020, the City of Cape Town alone had demolished over 60 000 informal structures as part of its anti-land invasion operations.

Unlawful occupations had led to the establishment of 54 new settlements of various sizes across the city since the start of the Covid-19 lockdowns from March 2020. In May 2021 an additional allocation of R170.8 million for added security was approved by the City of Cape Town's council to protect its land against unlawful occupiers.

This brought the total budget allocated for protecting city land to prevent the negative fall outs of unlawful occupation to approximately R252 million in the new financial year according to the City of Cape Town.

As a whole the Western Cape Department of Human Settlements, said it had already spent more than R355 million to prevent illegal land invasions and the illegal occupation of completed units. Between July 2020 and 28 February 2021, there were 1 078 attempts of illegal land invasions across the province, with the majority being in the Cape Metro. The province said this means, with the exclusion of the bulk services, approximately 2 150 Breaking New Ground (BNG)/free housing units could’ve been built.

=== City of Johannesburg - Rabie Ridge Land Invasion ===
In April 2020, over 2 000 people attempted a land invasion in Rabie Ridge, assuming it was government owned land which had not been developed for a number of years.

However, it was later clarified that the land was under private ownership, with the majority shareholder being a private company called the South African Housing and Infrastructure Fund (SAHIF). Chief Executive Officer of SAHIF, Rali Mampeule, engaged with disgruntled community leaders and protestors to resolve the situation. The South African Police Service and the Johannesburg metro police deployed officers to patrol area, and ensure the safety of other residents and passers-by outside the property while the protests were underway.

The usual approach to land invasion remains evictions or relocation, but this is a challenging process for landowners (private or government), local authorities as well as policy makers.

== Legislation that relates to Land Invasion ==
There are laws in place that are intended to assist landowners, law enforcement officers and other authorities with land invasion and eviction. Depending on the situation, the following laws are applicable:

- The Trespass Act (Act No. 6 of 1959)
- The Land Reform (Labour Tenants) Act (Act No. 3 of 1996)
- The Extension of Security of Tenure Act, 1997 (Act No. 62 of 1997) (ESTA)
- Prevention of Illegal Eviction from and Unlawful Occupation of Land Act, 1998 (Act No. 19 of 1998) (PIE)

== See also ==
- South African property law
- List of land occupations in South Africa
- informal housing in South Africa
