= List of assassinated human rights activists =

This is a list of murdered political dissidents and human rights activists. The list is chronological.

| Intended victims | Year | Date | Title at the time | Place | Country | Assassin(s) |
|---|---|---|---|---|---|---|
| Olympe de Gouges | 1793 | 3 November | French playwright and political activist whose writings on women's rights and abolitionism brought her execution by guillotine | Paris | France | Executioner |
| Elijah Parish Lovejoy | 1837 | 7 November | American journalist, newspaper editor and abolitionist | Alton, Illinois | United States | mob |
| Anthony Bewley | 1860 | 13 September | Reverend of Methodist Episcopal Church and abolitionist | Fort Worth, Texas | United States | mob |
| Abraham Lincoln | 1865 | 15 April | President of the U.S. and anti-slavery activist | Washington, D.C. | United States | John Wilkes Booth |
| John W. Stephens | 1870 | 22 February | American state senator who assisted freed slaves | Yanceyville, North Carolina | United States | Ku Klux Klan |
| Francisco I. Madero | 1913 | 22 February | President of Mexico | Mexico City | Mexico | Victoriano Huerta |
| Song Jiaoren | 1913 | 22 March | Chinese republican leader of Kuomintang | Shanghai | China | Wu Shiying |
| Jean Jaurès | 1914 | 31 July | French Marxist anti-war activist | Paris | France | Raoul Villain |
| John Chilembwe | 1915 | 3 February | Malawian philosopher and educator | Shire Highlands | Nyasaland | British colonial officers |
| Karl Liebknecht | 1919 | 15 January | German revolutionary | Berlin | Germany | Freikorps |
| Rosa Luxemburg | 1919 | 15 January | Polish-German revolutionary | Berlin | Germany | Freikorps |
| Leo Jogiches | 1919 | 10 March | German Marxist revolutionary | Berlin | Germany | Freikorps |
| Emiliano Zapata | 1919 | 10 April | Mexican peasant leader | Chinameca | Mexico | Jesús Guajardo |
| Charlemagne Péralte | 1919 | 1 November | Haitian nationalist leader | Port-au-Prince | Haiti | U.S. Marines |
| Mustafa Suphi | 1921 | 28 January | Turkish communist leader | Black Sea | Turkey | Turkish agents |
| Michael Collins | 1922 | 22 August | Irish independence leader | Béal na Bláth | Ireland | Irish Civil War |
| Avni Rustemi | 1924 | 22 April | Albanian teacher and activist | Tirana | Albania | Jusuf Reçi |
| Giacomo Matteotti | 1924 | 10 June | Italian anti-fascist | Rome | Italy | Blackshirts |
| Takiji Kobayashi | 1933 | 20 February | Japanese author | Tokyo | Japan | police |
| Augusto César Sandino | 1934 | 21 February | Nicaraguan revolutionary | Managua | Nicaragua | United States Marine Corps |
| Antonio Guiteras | 1935 | 8 May | Cuban politician | Matanzas | Cuba | Cuban government |
| Walter W. Liggett | 1935 | 9 December | American journalist | Minneapolis, Minnesota | United States | Blumenfeld |
| Abdul Rahman Shahbandar | 1940 | June | Syrian nationalist | Damascus | Syria | National Bloc members |
| Leon Trotsky | 1940 | 21 August | Soviet dissident | Coyoacán, Mexico City | Mexico | Ramón Mercader |
| Marx Dormoy | 1941 | 26 July | French socialist politician | Montélimar | France | Comité secret d'action révolutionnaire |
| Carlo Tresca | 1943 | 11 January | American newspaper editor | New York City | United States | NKVD |
| Mahatma Gandhi | 1948 | 30 January | Indian independence movement leader | New Delhi | India | Nathuram Godse |
| Jorge Eliécer Gaitán | 1948 | 9 April | Mayor of Bogotá | Bogotá | Colombia | El Bogotazo |
| Julien Lahaut | 1950 | 18 August | Belgian Republican politician | Seraing | Belgium | François Goossens |
| Leonardo Ruiz Pineda | 1952 | 21 October | Venezuelan lawyer | Caracas | Venezuela | police |
| Albert Patterson | 1954 | 18 June | American attorney | Phenix City, Alabama | United States | Sheriff Albert Fuller |
| George W. Lee | 1955 | 7 May | American civil rights leader and minister | Midnight, Mississippi | United States | Unidentified shooter |
| Lamar Smith | 1955 | 13 August | American civil rights leader, farmer, and veteran | Brookhaven, Mississippi | United States | Unidentified shooter |
| Dr. Thomas Hency Brewer | 1956 | 18 February | American co-founder of an NAACP chapter | Columbus, Georgia | United States | Luico Flowers |
| Ali Boumendjel | 1957 | 23 March | Algerian militant and lawyer | El Biar | (France) French Algeria | Paul Aussaresses |
| Maurice Audin | 1957 | 11 June | Algerian student | Algiers | (France) French Algeria | André Charbonnier |
| Ruben Um Nyobé | 1958 | 13 September | Cameroonian anti-colonialist | Boumnyébel | Cameroon | French army |
| Patrice Lumumba | 1961 | 17 January | First Prime Minister of the Democratic Republic of the Congo and anti-colonial activist | near Élisabethville | Democratic Republic of the Congo | Congolese coup leaders with Belgian and U.S. involvement |
| Salah Ben Youssef | 1961 | 12 August | Tunisian lawyer and politician | Frankfurt | West Germany | Tunisian agents |
| Herbert Lee | 1961 | 25 September | American civil rights and voting rights activist | Liberty, Mississippi | United States | E. H. Hurst |
| Mouloud Feraoun | 1962 | 15 March | Algerian journalist and translator | Algiers | Algeria | OAS |
| William Lewis Moore | 1963 | 23 April | American protesting racial segregation | Attalla, Alabama | United States | Unidentified/disputed shooter |
| Grigoris Lambrakis | 1963 | 27 May | Greek anti-war activist | Thessaloniki | Greece | Emannouel Emannouilides and Spyros Gotzamanis |
| Medgar Evers | 1963 | 12 June | American civil rights activist | Jackson, Mississippi | United States | Byron De La Beckwith |
| Louis Allen | 1964 | 31 January | American voting rights activist | Amite County, Mississippi | United States | Disputed |
| James Chaney | 1964 | 21 June | American civil rights activist | Philadelphia, Mississippi | United States | Ku Klux Klan |
| Andrew Goodman | 1964 | 21 June | American civil rights activist | Philadelphia, Mississippi | United States | Ku Klux Klan |
| Michael Schwerner | 1964 | 21 June | American civil rights activist | Philadelphia, Mississippi | United States | Ku Klux Klan |
| Humberto Delgado | 1965 | 13 February | Portuguese anti-fascist | Olivenza | Spain | PIDE |
| Malcolm X | 1965 | 21 February | American human rights activist | New York City | United States | members of the Nation of Islam |
| Pio Gama Pinto | 1965 | 24 February | Kenyan journalist | Nairobi | Kenya | police |
| James Reeb | 1965 | 11 March | American minister and civil rights activist | Alabama | United States | mob |
| Viola Liuzzo | 1965 | 25 March | American civil rights activist | Selma, Alabama | United States | Ku Klux Klan |
| Jonathan Daniels | 1965 | 20 August | American civil rights activist | Hayneville, Alabama | United States | Tom Coleman |
| Mehdi Ben Barka | 1965 | 29 October | Moroccan revolutionary fighter and politician | Paris | France | French intelligence agents |
| Sammy Younge Jr. | 1966 | 3 January | American civil rights and voting rights activist | Tuskegee, Alabama | United States | Marvin Segrest |
| Vernon Dahmer | 1966 | 10 January | American civil rights and voting rights activist | Hattiesburg, Mississippi | United States | Ku Klux Klan |
| Osende Afana | 1966 | 15 March | Cameroonian economist | Ndélélé | Cameroon | Cameroonian Armed Forces |
| Chit Phumisak | 1966 | 5 May | Thai Marxist historian | Waritchaphum | Thailand | local villagers |
| Robert W. Spike | 1966 | 17 October | American civil rights activist | Columbus, Ohio | United States | unknown |
| Wharlest Jackson | 1967 | 27 February | American NAACP chapter treasurer | Natchez, Mississippi | United States | unknown |
| Benno Ohnesorg | 1967 | 2 June | German anti-war activist | West Berlin | West Germany | Karl-Heinz Kurras |
| Che Guevara | 1967 | 9 October | Argentine revolutionary | La Higuera | Bolivia | CIA-assisted Bolivian forces |
| Martin Luther King Jr. | 1968 | 4 April | American civil rights activist | Memphis, Tennessee | United States | James Earl Ray |
| Robert F. Kennedy | 1968 | 6 June | U.S. presidential candidate | Los Angeles, California | United States | Sirhan Bishara Sirhan |
| Tom Mboya | 1969 | 5 July | Kenyan Cabinet Minister | Nairobi | Kenya | Nahashon Isaac Njenga Njoroge |
| Fred Hampton | 1969 | 4 December | American civil rights activist | Chicago, Illinois | United States | members of the Chicago Police Department |
| Krim Belkacem | 1970 | 18 October | Algerian revolutionary fighter and politician | Frankfurt | West Germany | unknown |
| Dhirendranath Datta | 1971 | 29 March | East Pakistani lawyer | Moynamoti | East Pakistan | Pakistani Army |
| Maximiliano Gómez | 1971 | 23 May | Dominican Republic politician | | Dominican Republic | orders of Joaquin Balaguer |
| Ghassan Kanafani | 1972 | 8 July | Palestinian writer | Beirut | Lebanon | Mossad |
| Outel Bono | 1973 | 26 August | Chadian medical doctor and politician | Paris | France | French secret service and Chadian Government |
| Amílcar Cabral | 1973 | 20 January | Guinea-Bissauan and Cape Verdean intellectual, poet, theoretician, and revolutionary | Conakry | Guinea | Portuguese intelligence agents |
| Víctor Jara | 1973 | 16 September | Chilean teacher and theater director | Santiago | Chile | Pedro Barrientos |
| José Tohá | 1974 | 15 March | Chilean journalist | Santiago | Chile | military |
| Carlos Mugica | 1974 | 11 May | Argentine Roman Catholic priest and activist | Villa Luro | Argentina | Rodolfo Almirón |
| Silvio Frondizi | 1974 | 27 September | Argentine intellectual and lawyer | Buenos Aires | Argentina | Argentine Anticommunist Alliance |
| Josiah Mwangi Kariuki | 1975 | 2 March | Kenyan socialist politician | Nairobi | Kenya | Kenyan police |
| Herbert Chitepo | 1975 | 18 March | Rhodesian ZANU-activist | Lusaka | Zambia | Rhodesian Security Forces |
| Roque Dalton | 1975 | 10 May | Salvadoran poet, essayist, journalist, political activist, and intellectual | San Salvador | El Salvador | People's Revolutionary Army |
| Omar Benjelloun | 1975 | 18 December | Moroccan journalist and trade union activist | Casablanca | Morocco | Chabiba islamia |
| Boonsanong Punyodyana | 1976 | 28 February | Thai socialist politician | Bangkok | Thailand | unknown |
| Enrique Angelelli | 1976 | 4 August | Bishop of La Rioja | Sañogasta | Argentina | Argentinian military |
| Orlando Letelier | 1976 | 21 September | Chilean economist, ex-ambassador | Washington, DC | United States | Dirección de Inteligencia Nacional |
| Janani Luwum | 1977 | 17 February | Ugandan archbishop | Kampala | Uganda | Idi Amin regime |
| Rutilio Grande | 1977 | 12 March | Salvadoran priest | Aguilares | El Salvador | mob |
| Shewalul Mengistu | 1977 | 26 May | Ethiopian writer and political activist | Addis Ababa | Ethiopia | Unknown |
| Bantu Stephen Biko | 1977 | 12 September | South African anti-apartheid activist | Pretoria | South Africa | South African Police Forces |
| Mir Akbar Khyber | 1978 | 17 April | Afghan intellectual and editor | Kabul | Afghanistan | Unknown, Possibly Hekmatyar's Hezbi Islami, Khalq Faction of PDPA or Babrak Karmal |
| Henri Curiel | 1978 | 4 May | Egyptian left-wing political activist | Paris | France | OAS and Charles Martel Group |
| Georgi Markov | 1978 | 11 September | Bulgarian dissident | London | United Kingdom | Bulgarian secret service |
| Harvey Milk | 1978 | 27 November | American LGBT human rights activist | San Francisco, California | United States | Dan White |
| George R. Moscone | 1978 | 27 November | Mayor of San Francisco | San Francisco, California | United States | Dan White |
| José Miguel Beñaran Ordeñana | 1978 | 21 December | Spanish Basque activist | Anglet | France | car bomb |
| Allard K. Lowenstein | 1980 | 14 March | American civil rights activist | New York City | United States | Dennis Sweeney |
| Óscar Romero | 1980 | 24 March | Archbishop of San Salvador | San Salvador | El Salvador | mob |
| Walter Rodney | 1980 | 13 June | Guyanese historian, political activist and scholar | Georgetown | Guyana | unknown |
| Marcelo Quiroga Santa Cruz | 1980 | 17 July | Bolivian writer, dramatist, and journalist | La Paz | Bolivia | Luis Garcia Meza |
| Enrique Álvarez Córdova | 1980 | 27 November | Salvadoran politician | San Salvador | El Salvador | Brígada Anticomunista Maximiliano Hernández Martínez |
| John Lennon | 1980 | 8 December | British anti-war activist and ex-Beatle | New York City | United States | Mark David Chapman |
| Pierre Declercq | 1981 | 19 September | French New Caledonian politician | Nouméa | New Caledonia | unknown |
| Anwar Sadat | 1981 | 6 October | President of Egypt and peace activist | Cairo, Egypt | Egypt | Egyptian Islamic Jihad |
| Attati Mpakati | 1983 | 24 March | Malawian dissident | Harare | Zimbabwe | Malawian agents |
| Benigno Aquino Jr. | 1983 | 21 August | Filipino opposition leader | Manila | Philippines | Filipino agents |
| Alan Berg | 1984 | 1 January | American attorney and talk radio show host | Denver, Colorado | United States | Silent Brotherhood |
| Henry Liu | 1984 | 15 October | Taiwanese writer and journalist | Daly City, California | United States | Bamboo Union |
| Jerzy Popiełuszko | 1984 | 19 October | Polish Roman Catholic priest | Włocławek | Poland | Polish Security Service |
| Éloi Machoro | 1985 | 12 January | New Caledonian Kanak politician | Canala | New Caledonia | French gendarme |
| Fort Calata | 1985 | 27 June | South African anti-apartheid activist | Port Elizabeth | South Africa | South African Police Forces |
| Matthew Goniwe | 1985 | 27 June | South African anti-apartheid activist | Port Elizabeth | South Africa | South African Police Forces |
| Sicelo Mhlauli | 1985 | 27 June | South African anti-apartheid activist | Port Elizabeth | South Africa | South African Police Forces |
| Sparrow Mkhonto | 1985 | 27 June | South African anti-apartheid activist | Port Elizabeth | South Africa | South African Police Forces |
| Shahnawaz Bhutto | 1985 | 18 July | Pakistani democracy activist | Nice | France | Zia ul-Haq regime |
| Hugo Spadafora | 1985 | 13 September | Panamanian activist | La Concepción | Panama | Panamanian government |
| Murtaza Bhutto | 1985 | 20 September | Pakistani democracy activist | Karachi | Pakistan | police |
| Gérard Hoarau | 1985 | 29 November | Seychellois politician | London | United Kingdom | France-Albert René regime |
| Olof Palme | 1986 | 28 February | Prime Minister of Sweden | Stockholm | Sweden | |
| Peter Tosh | 1987 | 11 September | Jamaican reggae musician and activist for Black liberation | Kingston | Jamaica | Dennis "Leppo" Lobban |
| Jaime Pardo Leal | 1987 | 11 October | Colombian lawyer and union leader | La Mesa | Colombia | Colombian mafia |
| Dulcie September | 1988 | 29 March | South African anti-apartheid political activist | Paris | France | South African agents |
| Chico Mendes | 1988 | 22 December | Brazilian trade unionist and environmentalist | Xapuri | Brazil | Darci and Darly Alves da Silva, Jerdeir Pereira |
| Pat Finucane | 1989 | 12 February | Irish lawyer | Belfast | United Kingdom | Ken Barrett |
| David Webster | 1989 | 1 May | South African anthropologist | Troyeville | South Africa | South African Civil Cooperation Bureau |
| Jean-Marie Tjibaou | 1989 | 4 May | New Caledonian Kanak politician | Ouvéa | New Caledonia | Djubelly Wéa |
| Abdul Rahman Ghassemlou | 1989 | 13 July | Head of the Democratic Party of Iranian Kurdistan | Vienna | Austria | Iranian agents |
| Luis Carlos Galán | 1989 | 18 August | Colombian journalist | Bogotá | Colombia | Colombian mafia |
| Anton Lubowski | 1989 | 12 September | Namibian anti-apartheid activist | Windhoek | Namibia | South African Civil Cooperation Bureau |
| Segundo Montes | 1989 | 16 November | Salvadoran priest | San Salvador | El Salvador | Salvadoran army |
| Ignacio Ellacuría | 1989 | 16 November | Salvadoran philosopher and theologian | San Salvador | El Salvador | Salvadoran army |
| Richard de Zoysa | 1990 | 18 February | Sri Lankan journalist and actor | Rajagiriya | Sri Lanka | Sri Lanka-linked death squad |
| Farag Foda | 1992 | 9 June | Egyptian professor | Heliopolis | Egypt | Al-Gama'a al-Islamiyya |
| Marsha P. Johnson | 1992 | 4 July | Gay liberation and AIDS activist | New York City | United States | Unknown (described by witnesses as a "group of thugs") |
| Tavio Amorin | 1992 | 29 July | Togolese politician | Lomé | Togo | police |
| Tahar Djaout | 1993 | 26 May | Algerian journalist and poet | Algiers | Algeria | Armed Islamic Group |
| Chris Hani | 1993 | 10 April | South African Anti-apartheid activist | Boksburg | South Africa | Janusz Waluś |
| Jorge Carpio Nicolle | 1993 | 3 July | Guatemalan newspaper publisher | Chichicastenango | Guatemala | mob |
| Melchior Ndadaye | 1993 | 21 October | Burundian intellectual and politician | Bujumbura | Burundi | Burundi Army |
| Cheb Hasni | 1994 | 29 September | Algerian musician | Oran | Algeria | Armed Islamic Group |
| Johan Heyns | 1994 | 5 November | South African Anti-apartheid activist | Pretoria | South Africa | White South African extremists |
| Iqbal Masih | 1995 | 16 April | Pakistani child activist | Muridke | Pakistan | Carpet Mafia |
| Jaswant Singh Khalra | 1995 | 6 September | Indian human rights activist | Jhabal | India | Kanwar Pal Singh Gill |
| Yitzhak Rabin | 1995 | 4 November | Prime Minister of Israel and peace activist | Tel Aviv, Israel | Israel | Yigal Amir |
| Kudirat Abiola | 1996 | 9 June | spouse of Nigerian presidential candidate Moshood Abiola | Lagos | Nigeria | team of six men |
| Abdelhak Benhamouda | 1997 | 28 January | Algerian trade unionist | Algiers | Algeria | unknown |
| Bishop Juan José Gerardi | 1998 | 26 April | Guatemalan Roman Catholic bishop | San Sebastian Church | Guatemala | Guatemalan military personnels |
| Larisa Yudina | 1998 | 8 June | Russian journalist | Elista | Russia | unknown |
| Lounès Matoub | 1998 | 25 June | Algerian musician | Beni Aïssi | Algeria | police |
| Azem Hajdari | 1998 | 12 September | Albanian anti-communists | Tirana | Albania | Fatmir Haklaj, Jaho Mulosmani, and Naim Cangu |
| Sanjaasürengiyn Zorig | 1998 | 2 October | Mongolian activist | Ulaanbaatar | Mongolia | unknown |
| Galina Starovoytova | 1998 | 20 November | Russian dissident | St Petersburg | Russia | Russian state security service |
| Norbert Zongo | 1998 | 13 December | Burkinabé publisher | Sapouy | Burkina Faso | Burkinabé agents |
| Jaime Hurtado | 1999 | 17 February | Ecuadorian politician | Quito | Ecuador | Christian Steven Ponce |
| Jean Dominique | 2000 | 3 April | Haitian journalist | Port-au-Prince | Haiti | unknown |
| Carlos Cardoso | 2000 | 22 November | Mozambican journalist | Maputo | Mozambique | Nyimpine Chissano and Aníbal dos Santos |
| Filemon Lagman | 2001 | 6 February | Filipino workers' leader | Quezon City | Philippines | unknown |
| Phoolan Devi | 2001 | 25 July | Indian activist | New Delhi | India | Sher Singh Rana |
| Pim Fortuyn | 2002 | 6 May | Dutch politician and LGBT human rights activist | Hilversum, Netherlands | Netherlands | Volkert van der Graaf |
| Jarallah Omar | 2002 | 28 December | Yemeni politician, intellectual | Sana'a | Yemen | Ali Ahmad al-Jarallah |
| Zelimkhan Yandarbiyev | 2004 | 13 February | Chechen exiled separatist writer | Doha | Qatar | FSB agents |
| Brian Williamson | 2004 | 5 June | Jamaican LGBT+ rights activist | Kingston | Jamaica | Dwight Hayden |
| Munir Said Thalib | 2004 | 7 September | Indonesian human rights activist | Schiphol | Netherlands | Pollycarpus Budihari Priyanto |
| FannyAnn Eddy | 2004 | 28 September | LGBT rights activist | Freetown | Sierra Leone | Unknown |
| Deyda Hydara | 2004 | 16 December | Gambian newspaper reporter | Banjul | Gambia | Yahya Jammeh regime |
| Elmar Hüseynov | 2005 | 2 March | Azerbaijani journalist | Baku | Azerbaijan | Azerbaijani regime |
| Dorothy Stang | 2005 | 15 March | Brazilian-American missionary | Anapu | Brazil | Clodoaldo Carlos Batista and Raifran das Neves Sales |
| Filiberto Ojeda Ríos | 2005 | 23 September | Puerto Rican independence activist | Hormigueros | Puerto Rico | FBI |
| Anna Politkovskaya | 2006 | 7 October | Russian journalist | Moscow | Russia | three Chechen men |
| Aleksandr Litvinenko | 2006 | 23 November | Russian dissident | London | United Kingdom | FSB agents |
| Hrant Dink | 2007 | 19 January | Turkish-Armenian editor, journalist and columnist | Istanbul | Turkey | Ogün Samast |
| Gabriel Mkhumane | 2008 | 1 April | Swazi opposition leader | Nelspruit | South Africa | Swaziland government agents |
| Tonderai Ndira | 2008 | 13–22 May | Zimbabwean political dissident | Harare | Zimbabwe | Zimbabwean agents |
| Natalya Estemirova | 2009 | 15 July | Russian human rights activist | Ingushetia | Russia | unknown |
| David Kato | 2011 | 27 January | Gay rights activist and teacher | Mukono Town | Uganda | Sidney Nsubuga Enoch |
| Raymond Taavel | 2012 | 17 April | LGBT rights activist | Halifax | Canada | Andre Noel Denny |
| Sakine Cansız | 2013 | 9 January | Turkish Kurdish women's rights activist | Paris | France | Turkish agents |
| Chokri Belaïd | 2013 | 6 February | Tunisian lawyer | El Menzah | Tunisia | Kamel Gaghgadhi |
| Nkululeko Gwala | 2013 | 26 June | Activist and leader of shack dwellers' movement Abahlali baseMjondolo | Durban | South Africa | Hitmen linked to African National Congress |
| Nqobile Nzuza | 2013 | 30 September | Member of shack dwellers' movement Abahlali baseMjondolo | Durban | South Africa | Police Officer |
| Thuli Ndlovu | 2014 | 29 September | Activist and leader of shack dwellers' movement Abahlali baseMjondolo | Durban | South Africa | Hitmen linked to African National Congress |
| Avijit Roy | 2015 | 26 February | Bangladeshi online activist | Dhaka | Bangladesh | Ansarullah Bangla Team |
| Boris Nemtsov | 2015 | 27 February | Russian political activist | Moscow | Russia | two Chechen men |
| Diana Sacayán | 2015 | 13 October | Argentinian transgender rights activist | Buenos Aires | Argentina | Gabriel David Marino |
| Berta Cáceres | 2016 | 3 March | Honduran environmental activist, indigenous leader | La Esperanza | Honduras | employees of DESA |
| Xulhaz Mannan | 2016 | 25 April | Bangladeshi LGBT rights activist | Dhaka | Bangladesh | Ansar-al-Islam, an Al-Qaida affiliate |
| Marielle Franco | 2018 | 14 March | Brazilian politician, feminist, and human rights activist | Rio de Janeiro | Brazil | the Brazilian Government, allegedly |
| Arman Loni | 2019 | 2 February | Pashtun civil rights activist | Balochistan | Pakistan | Pakistani Police |
| Esther Mwikali | 2019 | August | Kenyan land rights activist | Murang’a County | Kenya | Unknown |
| Marc Angelucci | 2020 | 11 July | US Men's Rights Activist and Attorney | California | US | Roy Den Hollander |
| Ayanda Ngila | 2022 | 8 March | Activist and leader of shack dwellers' movement Abahlali baseMjondolo and the eKhenana Commune | Durban | South Africa | Hitmen linked to African National Congress |
| Nokuthula Mabaso | 2022 | 5 May | Activist and leader of shack dwellers' movement Abahlali baseMjondolo and the eKhenana Commune | Durban | South Africa | Hitmen linked to African National Congress |
| Lindokuhle Mnguni | 2022 | 20 August | Activist and leader of shack dwellers' movement Abahlali baseMjondolo and the eKhenana Commune | Durban | South Africa | Hitmen linked to African National Congress |
