= List of land occupations in South Africa =

South Africa is a deeply unequal society, with high unemployment and homelessness. One response to this on the part of social movements of the poor has been the occupation of land. This article lists some prior and ongoing land occupations in South Africa.

== 2001 ==
- Bredell land occupation

== 2009 ==
- Macassar Village land occupation

== 2011 ==
- Mitchell's Plain land occupation

== 2013 ==
- Marikana land occupation (Cape Town)
- Marikana land occupation (Durban)

== See also ==
- Anti-Land Invasion Unit (Cape Town)
- Abahlali baseMjondolo
- Western Cape Anti-Eviction Campaign
