= Political assassinations in post-apartheid South Africa =

There have been many political assassinations in post-apartheid South Africa. In 2013 it was reported that there had been more than 450 political assassinations in the province of KwaZulu-Natal since the end of apartheid in 1994. In July 2013 the Daily Maverick reported that there had been "59 political murders in the last five years". In August 2016 it was reported that there had been at least twenty political assassinations in the run up to the local government elections on the 3rd of August that year, most of them in KwaZulu-Natal.

Political assassinations have often been ascribed to battles around patronage within the ruling African National Congress. However, not all assassinations are a result of conflict within the ruling party. The National Freedom Party led by Zanele Magwaza-Msibi, with its base largely in KwaZulu-Natal, claims that 21 of its members have been killed since the party was founded in early 2011. The Inkatha Freedom Party claims that ten of its elected representatives have been murdered. In June 2013 Abahlali baseMjondolo, an autonomous shack dwellers' movement in Durban, claimed that the murder of Nkululeko Gwala, a local leader in the organisation, was a political assassination. In May 2016 two ANC councillors were convicted of murder following the assassination of Thuli Ndlovu, also a local leader in Abahlali baseMjondolo . In September 2020 it was reported that "Since 2016, there have been at least 38 assassinations and 14 attempted assassinations in mining localities in KwaZulu-Natal."

According to Raymond Suttner "assassinations have become a regularised way of deciding on leadership and access to wealth within the ANC and its allies". In 2016 the ANC Secretary General, Gwede Mantashe said: "The reality is that selection of candidates for council is always a life-and-death issue." Assassinations is only part of violence that surrounds South African elections. David Bruce published an extensive report on the 2014 election pointing to the subtle and complex ways in which the ANC intimidates its political rivals. In the run up to the 2014 election the Independent Electoral Commission did little to intervene to prevent violence, the abuse of government resources and the use of the state run media (the SABC) to favour the ruling party.

Mark Shaw and Kim Thomas have recorded just over 1,000 individual cases of assassination or attempted assassination.

The high prevalence of political assassinations in South Africa was discussed at the United Nations Human Rights Council in 2022.

Former Minister of Police, Senzo Mchunu, was accused of interfering in police investigations into politically motivated murders. He has since been suspended as Minister of Police and replaced by Firoz Cachalia.

== Location of assassinations ==
It has been argued that the situation is particularly bad in the provinces of Mpumalanga and KwaZulu-Natal with KwaZulu-Natal being, by far, the worst. KwaZulu-Natal has been described as the "epicenter of political violence" while Mpumalanga has been described as "notorious for political assassinations" Fourteen assassinations have been documented in Mpumalanga and 450 in KwaZulu-Natal. It has been reported that "Since the beginning of 2011, the murder of people with high political profiles has been confined almost exclusively to KwaZulu-Natal, with 27 in the province since February 2011. According to the ANC 38 of its members have been assassinated in KwaZulu-Natal since the beginning of 2011. It has been suggested that support for murders in the taxi industry in KwaZulu-Natal by leading figures in the ruling party legitimated the use of violence in the democratic era which then spilled over into the political sphere.

== Conviction rates and a possible 'licence to kill' ==
There has been one conviction in response to the fourteen assassinations in Mpumalanga and four in KwaZulu-Natal for forty two assassinations leading one researcher to conclude that some people are starting to believe there may be a "general licence for political killings" but that "this may only be available to people in certain political positions".

== List of politicians assassinated in post-Apartheid South Africa ==
- Thomas Shabalala, IFP MP (and former warlord), Durban, KwaZulu-Natal, 2005
- Thandi Mtsweni, Deputy Mayor, Secunda, Mpumalanga, 2007
- Rajah Naidoo, Independent councillor, Durban, KwaZulu-Natal, 2007
- Moss Phakoe, ANC councillor, Rustenburg, North West Province, 2009
- Caswell Maluleke, ANC Mayor Bushbuckridge, Mpumalanga, 2000
- Jimmy Mtolo, local ANC leader, Durban, KwaZulu-Natal, 2009
- Sthembiso Cele, chairperson of the ANC Youth League in Umgababa, KwaZulu-Natal, 2009
- Bongani Ngcobo, ANC leader, Nongoma, KwaZulu-Natal, 2009
- Jabulani Khumalo, ANC leader, Nongoma, KwaZulu-Natal, 2009
- Jimmy Mohlala, ANC leader, Mbombela, Mpumalanga, 2010
- James Nkambule, Congress of the People Mpumalanga provincial leader, 2010
- Sammy Mpatlanyane, senior ANC politician, Mpumalanga, 2010
- John Ndlovu, ANC politician, Thulamasha, Mpumalanga, 2011
- S'bu Sibiya, ANC regional secretary, Durban, KwaZulu-Natal, 2011
- Wiseman Mshibe, ANC councillor, Durban, KwaZulu-Natal, 2011
- Wandile Mkhize, ANC chief whip, South Coast, KwaZulu-Natal, 2012
- Nhlakanipho Shabane, ANC member, South Coast, KwaZulu-Natal, 2012
- Dumisani Malunga, ANC member, South Coast, KwaZulu-Natal, 2012
- Bheki Chiliza, ANC member, South Coast, KwaZulu-Natal, 2012
- Mthembeni Shezi, ANC Councillor, Durban, KwaZulu-Natal 2012
- David Mosiane Chika, ANC Leader, North West 2012
- S'bu Majola, ANC branch chairperson, Wembezi, Estcourt, KwaZulu-Natal, 2013
- Makhosonke Msibi, ANC Councillor, Nongoma, KwaZulu-Natal, 2013
- Siphumelelo Buthelezi, NFP Councillor, Ulundi, 3 November 2013
- Buyisile Mkavu, ANC Councillor, KwaLanga, Uitenhage, 4 August 2014
- Charles Thembisile Kanku, ANC ward councillor, Cape Town, 20 October 2014

== List of other political assassinations in post-Apartheid South Africa ==
- Sinethemba Myeni, 12 April 2006, Umlazi, Durban, KwaZulu-Natal (former SACP member supporting independent candidate in local government elections)
- Mazwi 'Komi' Zulu, 3 May 2006, Umlazi, Durban, KwaZulu-Natal (former SACP member supporting independent candidate in local government elections)
- Scorpion Dimane, anti-mining activist, Mbizana, 2008
- Mbongeleni Zondi, traditional leader with close ties to Jacob Zuma and the ANC, Durban, 2009
- Mthunzi Nkonki, MV veteran, Port Elizabeth, Eastern Cape, 2010
- Bomber 'Radioman' Ntshangase, SACP leader, Mpumalanga, 2012
- Kevin Kunene, environmental rights activist, KwaMbonambi, 2012
- Dalivuyo Bongo, National Union of Mineworkers, Rustenburg, North West, 2012
- Thembinkosi Qumbelo, Local activist and ANC leader, Durban, KwaZulu-Natal, 2013
- Two unnamed members of Abahlali baseMjondolo, KwaNdengezi, Durban, KwaZulu-Natal, 2013
- Steve Khululekile, AMCU regional organiser, Rustenburg, North West, 2013
- Nkululeko Gwala, Abahlali baseMjondolo activist, Durban, KwaZulu-Natal, 2013
- Sthembiso Biyela & Buyisile Malusi, (Biyela was reported to have left the IFP to join the ANC) Durban, 2014
- Njabulo Ndebele, Sibonelo “John-John” Ntuli and Ntobeko Maphumulo, NUMSA leaders, Isithebe, KwaZulu-Natal, August 2014
- Thuli Ndlovu, Abahlali baseMjondolo leader, KwaNdengezi, Durban, 2014
- Charles Khanku, SANCO leader, Cape Town
- Mobeni Khwela, Local SACP activist, KwaNdengezi, Durban, 2014
- Mbuyiselo Phajana Mnguni, Free State regional chairperson of the Chemical, Energy, Paper, Printing, Wood and Allied Workers Union, 2014
- Chris Nkosi, Gauteng secretary of the South African Transport and Allied Workers Union, Germiston, 2015
- Philip Dlamini & another unnamed man, SACP members, Durban, 2015
- Sikhosiphi 'Bazooka Rhadebe', Chairperson of the chairman of the Amadiba Crisis Committee, Mbizana, Eastern Cape, 2016
- Nontsikelelo Blose, SACP activist, KwaZulu-Natal, 2016
- Mthunzi ‘Ras’ Zuma, Cape Town, 2017
- S'bonelo Mpeku, Chairperson of an Abahlali baseMjondolo branch in Lamontville, Durban, November 2017
- Soyiso Nkqayini, Youth League organiser for Abahlali baseMjondolo in Cato Manor, Durban, December 2017
- S'fiso Ngcobo, Chairperson of an Abahlali baseMjondolo branch in Marianhill, Durban, May 2018
- Bongani Cola, Democratic Municipal and Allied Workers Union of SA, Port Elizabeth, 2019
- Fikile Ntshangase, Anti-mining activists, Northern KwaZulu-Natal, 22 October 2020
- Malibongwe Mdazo, National Union of Metalworkers of South Africa, Rustenburg, North West Province, 18 August 2021
- Ayanda Ngila, Abahlali baseMjondolo leader, Durban, 8 March 2022
- Nokuthula Mabaso, Abahlali baseMjondolo leader, Durban, 5 May 2022
- Lindokuhle Mnguni, Abahlali baseMjondolo leader, Durban, 20 August 2022
- Loyiso Nkohla, Former Ses’khona People’s Rights Movement leader, Cape Town, 17 April 2023

== List of assassinations of government officials in post-Apartheid South Africa ==
- Noby Ngombane, Head of the Free State government's policy monitoring and evaluation unit, Bloemfontein, Free State, 2005
- Sammy Mpatlanyane, spokesman for the Mpumalanga department of culture, sport and recreation, Nelspruit, 2010
- Oupa Matlaba, City Power, Johannesburg, 2011
- Andile Matshaya, Internal Auditor, Department of Transport, Pietermaritzburg, KwaZulu-Natal, 2012
- Lawrence Moepi, Forensic Auditor at a private firm contracted to the Public Protector's Office, Johannesburg, 2013
- Moses Tshake, Head Auditor, Department of Agriculture and Rural Development in the Free State, 2013
- Babita Deokaran, Gauteng Department of Health, 23 August 2021
- Fundile ‘Jeff’ Budaza, Makhanda, 2022
- Benedict Sithole, City of Johannesburg fraud investigator, Johannesburg, 2024
- Mpho Mafole, Ekurhuleni audit chief, Kempton Park, 2025

== See also ==
- Political repression in post-Apartheid South Africa
