= Marikana land occupation =

Marikana Land Occupation may refer to:

- Marikana land occupation (Cape Town), in the township of Philippi East
- Marikana land occupation (Durban) in the township of Cato Crest
- Marikana miners' strike and their occupation of the koppie during the strike
