= Marikana (disambiguation) =

Marikana is a town near Rustenburg, North West Province, South Africa.

Marikana may also refer to:

- Marikana massacre during 2012 miners' strike at Lonmin platinum mines
- Marikana land occupation (Cape Town), in the township of Philippi East, South Africa
- Marikana land occupation (Durban) in the township of Cato Crest, South Africa
