= Political repression in post-apartheid South Africa =

The Constitution of South Africa protects all basic political freedoms. However, there have been many incidents of political repression, dating back to at least 2002, as well as threats of future repression in violation of this constitution leading some analysts, civil society organisations and popular movements to conclude that there is a new climate of political repression or a decline in political tolerance.

It has been argued that repression peaked during the period of the Jacob Zuma presidency, with some analysts linking the increase in repression to the influence of the 'security cluster' under the Jacob Zuma presidency. It has been argued that Zuma "enhanced the coercive capacity of the state" and that he focused on "building a state based on fear". It has also been argued that repression has affected poor people's organisations most seriously but that repression directed against poor people has been systemically under-reported in the media.

Serious concern has been expressed about police brutality in South Africa. Sipho Hlongwane, writing in Business Day, has argued that "South Africa is a brutal police state." According to Greg Marinovich "The police are acting with impunity. Their political masters are acting with impunity. In the South Africa of 2012, if you are poor and without political clout, you are on your own." Amnesty International has expressed serious concerns about brutality, including torture and extrajudicial killings, at the hands of the police in South Africa. Ronnie Kasrils has argued that there has been a "descent into police state depravity" under Jacob Zuma. It has been observed that "Torture is routine practice in South Africa's police stations and prisons".

The country also has a serious problem with political assassinations.

It has been claimed that senior ANC politicians are responsible for the repression of grassroots activists. In 2012 Bishop Rubin Phillip said that "a dark night is settling over our country as the light of our democratic dawn dims".

== Threats to media freedom ==
Under Jacob Zuma the ANC expressed open opposition to media freedom. Serious concern was expressed about the proposed Media Appeals Tribunal and Protection of Information Bill which, if passed, would significantly reduce press freedom.

There have been a number of reports of serious intimidation of journalists. In 2007 the Freedom of Expression Institute and The Mercury newspaper reported a death threat against a journalist in Durban by controversial local businessman Ricky Govender who claims close links with Jacob Zuma. In Durban in 2009 the editor of The Mercury, Philani Makhanya, laid a charge of intimidation against S'bu Mpisani, a politically connected contractor for the housing department in that city who had allegedly threatened the newspaper for its investigations into his activities. In Port Elizabeth the branch chairperson of the ruling African National Congress (ANC), Nceba Faku, called for party supporters to burn down the offices of the local newspaper the Daily Dispatch in 2011. In 2012 Piet Rampedi and Adriaan Bassoon, journalists at the City Press, were subject to various threats and forms of intimidation while covering a story on corruption by Julius Malema. Also in 2012 ANC supporters publicly burnt copies of the City Press newspaper in Durban.

== Threats to artistic freedom ==
Poet Mbongeni Khumalo has claimed "that his no-holds barred lyricism attracted the attention of state security".

In 2012 leading figures in the ruling party called for a painting, The Spear, to be destroyed and publicly endorsed the defacement of the painting.

== Unlawful state bans on protests ==
There have been a number of independently documented cases where the constitutionally protected right to protest has not been honoured by the state. One particularly well documented instance occurred in Durban in 2006 and another in Cape Town in 2012. It has also been claimed that the right to protest has been summarily denied to shack dwellers on the East Rand. It has been argued that not just ANC controlled municipalities, but also opposition Democratic Alliance (DA) ones, engage in unlawful bans on the right to protest. It has also been suggested that recent judicial interventions amount to a de facto curtailment of the right to protest. It has been argued that there was an increase in the unlawful banning of protests after the 2012 Marikana massacre and that this has taken the form of a de facto "state of emergency".

== Police repression ==
=== Militarisation of the police ===
The police, which were demilitarised after apartheid have been remilitarised and some politicians have encouraged the police to 'shoot to kill'. In the view of some analysts this has contributed to escalating repression. Concern has also been expressed at use of tactical response teams to contain popular protest and at the idea that the army should support the police in containing popular protest.

=== Police harassment of journalists ===
In 2010 journalists Mzilikazi waAfrika was arrested at the offices of the Sunday Times. Charges against him were later dropped. waAfrika's phone was also unlawfully tapped by the police. In July 2012 Nic Dawes, Sam Sole and Stefaans Brummer, journalists at the Mail & Guardian, were questioned by the police following the publication of a story alleging corruption by senior ANC leader Mac Maharaj.

=== Police harassment of activists ===
There have been numerous incidents of repression against grassroots social movements and activists have alleged arrests on trumped up charges and assaults at the hands of the police. For instance it was reported that Ashraf Cassiem from the Western Cape Anti-Eviction Campaign was assaulted by the police in 2000 while resisting an eviction and that S'bu Zikode and Philani Zungu from Abahlali baseMjondolo were arrested and assaulted while on the way to a radio interview in 2006. In September 2010 four residents of Hangberg, in Hout Bay, near Cape Town were shot in the face at close range by police with rubber bullets leading to the loss of their eyes. In February 2011 two protesters were killed by the police and a number subject to torture in Ermelo. In January 2012 it was reported that Ayanda Kota was assaulted in the Grahamstown police station. In August and September 2012 strikers and community activists in Marikana were subject to sustained police harassment, including a large number of fatalities. In October 2012 activists in Makause, on the East Rand, reported death threats from the police. In December 2012 it was reported that in Wesselton, Mpumalanga, police were engaged in sustained collective harassment, some of it violent, of a local community.

=== Police torture of activists ===
There has been general concern about police torture in South Africa, which has been described as "occurring en masse" and "spiralling out of control". In 1996 Kevin Kunene, founding chairman of the KwaMbonambi Environmental Group, was tortured by the police. Organisations such as the Landless People's Movement have documented cases in which activists and protesters have been tortured. There were media reports of police torture of activists in Wessleton, Ermelo, in 2011 and in Marikana in 2012.

People Killed by the Police During Protests

The worst instance of lethal police violence in response to protest since the end of the apartheid era in South Africa is the shootings of 34 striking miners at Marikanan near Rustenburg, which have come to be known as 'The Marikana Massacre', during the Marikana miner strike on 16 August 2012.

The ICD has reported a rise in police violence against protesters since 2010 and a number of unarmed protesters have been killed by the South African Police Service since 2000. Four people were killed by the police during protests between 2000 and 2004, two in 2006, one in 2008, two in 2009, three in 2010 and eleven in 2011. In 2016, Human Rights Watch documented at least 27 police killings of protesters and bystanders at 62 different protest locations around the country.

=== People killed by police during protests ===
- Yusuf Jacobs (22) Cape Town, 8 January 1999
- Michael Makhabane (23) Durban, 16 May 2000
- Abel Phetla (17) Alexandria, Johannesburg, 30 May 2000
- Dennis Mathibithi (17) and Nhlanhla Masuku (15), Kathlehong, 16 February 2004
- Tebogo Mkhonza (17), Harrismith, 30 August 2004
- Monica Ngcobo, (19) Durban, 2 March 2006
- Jan Matshobe, (27) Sebokeng, Johannesburg, 1 May 2008
- Mthokozisi Nkwanyana, (24) Durban, 2008
- Unnamed girl, KwaZakhele, KwaZulu-Natal, 1 July 2009
- Unnamed person, Mashishing, Mpumalanga, 5 June 2009
- Priscilla Sukai (46) eTwatwa, Daveyton, 2010
- Unnamed man, Siyazenzela, Mpumalanga, 5 April 2010
- Anna Nokele (19), Welkom, September 2010
- Two unnamed children, Boipelo, Gauteng, 15 February 2011
- Solomon Madonsela and Bongani Mathebula, 19 February 2011
- Dimakatso Kgaswane and unnamed person, Tlokweng, North West, 31 May 2011
- Andries Tatane (33), Ficksburg, 13 April 2011
- Nhlanhla Ngcobo (19) and two unnamed people in KwaDukuza, KwaZulu-Natal, 6 June 2011
- Mxolisi Buthelezi (14), Folweni Reserve, Durban, KwaZulu Natal, 2 July 2012
- Unnamed person (27), Mahikeng, North West, 4 July 2012
- Paulina Masuhlo, Marikana, North West, 19 September 2012
- Michael Daniels (28), Wolsely, Western Cape, 14 November 2012
- Service Nkadimeng (33), Primrose, Germiston, Gauteng, 18 November 2012
- Letsekang Tokhwane (25), De Doorns, 14 January 2013 (Note: Some media reports indicate that a third, unnamed protestor was also killed in the Western Cape Farm Workers' Strike)
- Six unnamed people, Sasolburg, Free State, 22 January 2013 (Note: One report indicates that one, also unnamed man, was reported to have been shot dead by a passing motorist)
- Nkosiyethu Wele Mgoq (15), Sterksrpuit, Eastern Cape, 15 February 2013
- Nqobile Nzuza (17), Durban, 30 September 2013
- Themba Khumalo (20), Bekkersdal, Gauteng, 23 October 2013
- Jan Rivombo, Pretoria, 8 January 2014
- Mike Tshele, Osia Rahube, Lerato Seema and Enock Seimela, Brits, 13 January 2014
- Tshepo Mabuseng (28), Roodepoort, Gauteng 23 January 2014
- Mozere Molele and Mohale "Lighty" Selo, Tzaneen, 29 January 2014
- Unnamed man, Soweto, 19 February 2014
- Unnamed three-month-old baby, Majakaneng, North West, March 2014
- Unnamed school child and 47-year-old man, Thembelihle, 25/26 February 2015
- Lucas Lebyane (15), Bushbuckridge, Mpumalanga, 27 February 2015
- Unnamed, Mopani, Limpopo 8 May 2015
- Unnamed male (23), Bedford, Eastern Cape 12 May 2015
- Unnamed, Burgersfort, Limpopo 13 May 2015
- Karabo Khumalo (11), Bela Bela, Limpopo, 7 February 2017,
- Unnamed 16-year-old boy, Standerton, Mpumalanga, May 2017
- Jayden Khoza, 2-week-old baby boy, Durban, May 2017
- Songezo Ndude (30), Imizamo Yethu, Hout Bay, July 2017.
- Steven Kau (23), East Rand, Johannesburg, January 2018
- Two unnamed people, Caledon, Western Cape, April 2019
- Two unnamed people, a seven-year-old girl and a 33-year-old man, Philippi East, Cape Town, 16 June 2020
- Leo Williams (9), Laingville, August 2020
- Zamekile Shangase (32), Lamontville, Durban
- Karabo Chaka (16), Johannesburg, 31 July 2023

=== People killed by private security guards during protests ===
- Christopher Jele (21), Piet Retief, 2009
- Ntombiyenkosi Mabika (24), Shaka's Kraal, June 2011
- Bongile Ndleni (40), Ceres, 18 November 2012
- Alfred Mzikayifani Mdiyako and Sanele Mthethwa, at the Magdalena and Aviemore mines in Dannhauser near Dundee, on 31 October 2012
- Malizo Fakaza and Nhlanhla Mkhize, Reservoir Hills, Durban, 19 October 2013 (Seven others were shot and injured)
- Unnamed person, Newclare, 6 October 2014
- Samuel Hloele (29), Durban, 13 June 2017
- Mlungisi Madonsela, Durban, 5 February 2019
- Boshelo Petja, Limpopo, 18 July 2019

=== Activists killed by vigilantes ===
- Terrance Mbuleo (33), Soweto, 2010
- Lerato Victor Rabolila (26), Sebokeng, 2014

=== People killed during protests by attackers whose details have not been clearly reported ===
- Unnamed Man, Bekkersdal, 2013

== Repression from forces other than the police ==
=== Harassment of activists by intelligence structures ===
The Right2Know Campaign has documented several instances in which activists have been harassed by intelligence structures.

=== Party political violence against activists ===
Organisations such as the Landless People's Movement, Abahlali baseMjondolo and the Unemployed People's Movement have been subject to armed political violence by groups claiming to represent the ruling ANC. The Makause Community Development Forum have also claimed to have been subject to state sanctioned violence by an ANC aligned 'mob'. There have also been cases where ANC supporters have disrupted protests organised by independent groups. One example of this was the attempt to disrupt a protest by the Moretele Concerned Communities Association in May 2012. It has been argued that the violence associated with the Marikana miners' strike in August 2012 began after officials of the National Union of Mineworkers murdered two strikers.

=== Death threats against activists ===
Grassroots activists have been reporting fears that they may be killed since at least 2002. There have been reports of death threats against activists in Ermelo (2011), in Grahamstown (2011), in eTwatwa on the East Rand (2010), and in Durban (2006, 2009, 2012).

=== Unsolved murders of activists claimed to be political assassinations ===
- Sinethemba Myeni, 12 April 2006, Umlazi, Durban, KwaZulu-Natal (former SACP member supporting independent candidate in local government elections)
- Mazwi 'Komi' Zulu, 3 May 2006, Umlazi, Durban, KwaZulu-Natal (former SACP member supporting independent candidate in local government elections)
- Scorpion Dimane, anti-mining activist, Mbizana, 2008
- Mbongeleni Zondi, traditional leader with close ties to Jacob Zuma and the ANC, Durban, 2009
- Mthunzi Nkonki, MV veteran, Port Elizabeth, Eastern Cape, 2010
- Bomber 'Radioman' Ntshangase, SACP leader, Mpumalanga, 2012
- Kevin Kunene, environmental rights activist, KwaMbonambi, 2012
- Dalivuyo Bongo, National Union of Mineworkers, Rustenburg, North West, 2012
- Thembinkosi Qumbelo, Local activist and ANC leader, Durban, KwaZulu-Natal, 2013
- Two unnamed members of Abahlali baseMjondolo, KwaNdengezi, Durban, KwaZulu-Natal, 2013
- Steve Khululekile, AMCU regional organiser, Rustenburg, North West, 2013
- Nkululeko Gwala, Abahlali baseMjondolo activist, Durban, KwaZulu-Natal, 2013
- Thuli Ndlovu, Abahlali baseMjondolo leader, KwaNdengezi, Durban, 2014
- Sthembiso Biyela & Buyisile Malusi, (Biyela was reported to have left the IFP to join the ANC) Durban, 2014
- Njabulo Ndebele, Sibonelo "John-John" Ntuli and Ntobeko Maphumulo, NUMSA leaders, Isithebe, KwaZulu-Natal, August 2014
- Charles Khanku, SANCO leader, Cape Town
- Mobeni Khwela, Local SACP activist, KwaNdengezi, Durban, 2014
- Mbuyiselo Phajana Mnguni, Free State regional chairperson of the Chemical, Energy, Paper, Printing, Wood and Allied Workers Union, 2014
- Chris Nkosi, Gauteng secretary of the South African Transport and Allied Workers Union, Germiston, 2015
- Philip Dlamini & another unnamed man, SACP members, Durban, 2015
- Sikhosiphi Bazooka Rhadebe, chairperson of the chairman of the Amadiba Crisis Committee, Mbizana, Eastern Cape, 2016
- Nontsikelelo Blose, SACP activist, KwaZulu-Natal, 2016
- Mthunzi 'Ras' Zuma, Cape Town, 2017
- S'bonelo Mpeku, Chairperson of an Abahlali baseMjondolo branch in Lamontville, Durban, November 2017
- Soyiso Nkqayini, Youth League organisers for Abahlali baseMjondolo in Cato Manor, Durban, December 2017
- S'fiso Ngcobo, Chairperson of an Abahlali baseMjondolo branch in Marianhill, Durban, May 2018
- Bongani Cola, Democratic Municipal and Allied Workers Union of SA, Port Elizabeth, 2019
- Malibongwe Mdazo, National Union of Metalworkers of South Africa, in Rustenburg, North West Province, 18 August 2021
- Ayanda Ngila, Abahlali baseMjondolo leader, Durban, 8 March 2022
- Nokuthula Mabaso, Abahlali baseMjondolo leader, Durban, 7 May 2022
- Lindokuhle Mnguni, Abahlali baseMjondolo leader, Durban, 20 August 2022

=== Convictions for political assassinations ===
- In May 2016 two ANC councillors were convicted of murder following the assassination of Thuli Ndlovu, a local leader in Abahlali baseMjondolo, an autonomous shack dwellers' movement in Durban.

=== Political violence & intimidation by MK veterans ===
In July 2012 Alpheus Moseri (68) collapsed and died following an assault by MK Veterans at a lecture given by Jacob Zuma. In October 2012 COSATU President Sidumo Dlamini called for MK veterans to use "their guerrilla military skills to work with us on the ground to defend this movement and our revolution as a whole" In November 2012 it was reported that MK veterans had made threats against Deputy President Kgalema Motlanthe. In November 2012 it was reported that armed men claiming to be MK veterans stormed into an ANC branch meeting on the East Rand and threatened to shoot members of the branch if they did not nominate Zuma for re-election.

According to Barney Pityana "we are beginning to see the emergence of party (or presidential) militia in the guise of the Umkhonto weSizwe Veterans, who are the new Gestapo with a fascist agenda."

== Breakdown in the rule of law ==
In Durban in 2013 the shack dwellers' movement Abahlali baseMjondolo secured five High Court injunctions against evictions which were "systemically ignored by state actors who have repeatedly torn down the shacks of local residents".

== Ruling party attitudes to independent organisations ==
According to Zwelinzima Vavi, COSATU Secretary General, "The [ruling] party unfortunately has adopted in our view an unnecessarily hostile posture to some progressive civil organisations and coalitions, painted a number of organisations with the same brush and has tended to take the view that they are the product of external agendas."

== See also ==
- Political Assassinations in Post-Apartheid South Africa
- Protest in South Africa
