= Bandile =

Bandile is a masculine given name, derived from the Nguni word ukwanda/kwandile, meaning "to increase/multiply/to grow/expand.". Notable people with the name include:

- Bandile Masuku (fl. 1994), South African physician and politician
- Bandile Mdlalose (fl. 2012), South African activist
- Bandile Shandu (born 1995), South African footballer
