= Gwala =

Gwala may refer to:

- Gowala (caste), an Indian caste of cattle herdsmen
- Gwala (wasp), a wasp genus in the subfamily Encyrtinae
- Harry Gwala (1920–1995), revolutionary leader in the African National Congress
  - Harry Gwala District Municipality
- Mafika Gwala (1946–2010), South African poet and editor
- Nkululeko Gwala (died 2013), supporter of the Marikana Land Occupation, in Durban, South Africa

== See also ==
- Gwale, a Local Government Area in Kano State, Nigeria
- Gwalvanshi, a sub division of Ahir
