= Dumela =

"Dumela" means "hello" in Sotho language. It may also refer to:

== Places ==
- Dumela, village in Chicualacuala District
- Dumela Industrial Complex Francistown
- NTWA Dumela Investments Marikana land occupation

== Music ==
- Dumela (album), album of South African hip hop artist Hip Hop Pantsula 2010

=== Songs ===
- "Dumela", by Mahlathini & the Mahotella Queens Composed by David Masondo
- "Dumela", song by Carolyn Malachi Ben Carver / Carolyn Malachi / Reagan Carver from soundtrack album of My Last Day Without You
