= D'Sa =

Surname list

D'Sa is a surname. Notable people with the surname include:

- Desmond D'Sa (1956–2026), South African environmentalist
- Ian D'Sa (born 1975), Canadian guitarist
- Leroy D'Sa (born 1953), Indian badminton player and coach
- Lisa Barros D'Sa (born 1974), British film director, writer, and producer
- Wilfred D'sa (born 1967), Indian politician

== See also ==
- De Sa
