= Gnowit =

Media monitoring software tool and company

- Type: Private company
- Industry: Government relations, Media monitoring, Public policy, Legislative monitoring and regulatory monitoring
- Founded: 2010; 16 years ago
- Founders: Shahzad Khan and Mohammad Al-Azzouni
- Headquarters: Ottawa, Canada
- Key people: Shahzad Khan (CEO)
- Products: Legislative and regulatory monitoring software, Parliamentary monitoring tools, Municipal monitoring, Media monitoring software, Government intelligence, Policy monitoring
- Website: www.gnowit.com

Gnowit (pronounced "know it") is a Canadian software company that provides automated, near-real-time monitoring of legislative, regulatory, and political activity across Canada. Its platform aggregates and analyzes information from government publications, parliamentary debates, committee, and proceedings to provide searchable alerts and reports for organizations monitoring public policy and regulatory developments. The system uses natural-language processing and machine learning techniques to organize and filter large volumes of public information.; the company reports that new publication documents are captured and millions of items are added to its repository daily.

== History, Founders and Leadership ==
Gnowit was co-founded in Ottawa in 2010 by Shahzad Khan and Mohammad Al-Azzouni; Khan serves as chief executive officer. Khan holds a PhD in Computer Science from the University of Cambridge, has more than two decades of experience in AI/ML and computational linguistics, and has authored or co-authored 37 peer-reviewed publications and five patents.

Traditionally, companies performed this analysis manually; Gnowit has delivered efficiencies achieved through AI innovations. The company has participated in several Canadian startup and accelerator programs, including Carleton University's Lead To Win initiative, the University of Ottawa's Startup Garage, the Invest Ottawa incubator, and the League of Innovators' BOOST program.

=== Kubernetes validation (2019–2020) ===
As part of a Canada's Centre of Excellence in Next Generation Networks (CENGN) project, Gnowit validated a containerized version of its web-intelligence software on Kubernetes. Between 2019 and 2020, Gnowit participated in a project with Canada’s Centre of Excellence in Next Generation Networks (CENGN) to test and scale its platform using containerized infrastructure based on Kubernetes. The initiative focused on improving scalability and supporting the company’s transition from a monolithic software architecture to a cloud-native deployment model.

== Products and services ==
Gnowit markets several modules for public-affairs, compliance, and market-intelligence teams.

1. Legislative & Regulatory Monitoring (vAnalyst). vAnalyst is a monitoring platform that tracks legislative and regulatory activity across Canadian federal, provincial, and territorial jurisdictions. The system aggregates parliamentary debates, bills, committee proceedings, and regulatory publications and provides searchable alerts and reporting tools. The product monitors more than two million web sources to surface relevant items quickly.
2. Parliamentary Live (vAnalyst). Monitors live video feeds from parliamentary sessions and committees with same-day transcripts, AI-generated summaries, witness summaries, and motion detection; municipal coverage is offered as an option. Gnowit can avail transcripts up to two weeks before official releases. These transcripts enable users to navigate and review lengthy parliamentary sittings and committee discussions through searchable text.
3. Municipal Monitoring (vAnalyst). The platform also tracks council meetings, agendas, bylaws, and other municipal government publications from hundreds of Canadian municipalities. The platform aggregates these sources into a single searchable interface for reviewing local government decisions.
4. Curation Edge (analyst service). Curation Edge is an add-on service in which expert analysts work and collaborate with clients to develop a tailored curation guide and deliver daily newsletters or briefs on legislation and media. These reports provide concise summaries, relevant links, and optional metadata, prioritizing key updates with additional context and analysis. The service is customizable, including branding and formatting for executive audiences, and is intended to reduce information overload, support decision-making, and streamline the synthesis and distribution of information.

=== Coverage and sources ===
Gnowit monitors sources span Canadian government materials across federal, provincial, and territorial jurisdictions Hansard transcripts (All Jurisdictions, including committees), order papers, committee transcripts, gazettes, bills, acts and regulations, consultations, regulatory-agency publications, and global news media as well as press releases and council-meeting materials from hundreds of municipalities.

== Partnerships and support ==
Gnowit reports collaborations with Canadian academic and ecosystem partners, including:

- Algonquin College
- Carleton University
- McGill University
- University of Ottawa
- Université du Québec en Outaouais (UQO)
- Queen's University

The company also participated in the accelerator program at Invest Ottawa and has received support from Canadian research and innovation programs, including:

- NRC Industrial Research Assistance Program (NRC-IRAP)
- Mitacs
- Ontario Centre of Innovation (OCI) (formerly OCE)

Gnowit has also referenced membership in the Southern Ontario Smart Computing Innovation Platform (Government of Canada profile: FedDev Ontario – SOSCIP overview).

== Technology ==
Gnowit develops technology intended to support timely decision-making by delivering updates from monitored web sources as they are published. The platform applies artificial intelligence (AI) and machine learning (ML) techniques to monitor, capture, clean, analyze, filter, and organize text, and to generate concise briefs. Its technical approach combines Boolean queries, shallow language processing techniques, and machine learning classifiers within a self-service interface. The company has described its longer-term development framework in relation to a belief–desire–intention (BDI) model of intelligent agents on the web.

Gnowit and its founder are listed as inventors/assignees on patents concerning multi-document clustering, salient-content extraction, and sentiment analysis methods that are consistent with these features:

- US 9,600,470 – Method and system relating to re-labelling multi-document clusters (assignee: Whyz Technologies Ltd.).
- US 9,336,202 – Method and system relating to salient content extraction for information retrieval (assignee: Whyz Technologies Ltd.).
- CA 2,865,184 C – Method and system relating to re-labelling multi-document clusters.
- CA 2,865,186 C – Procédé et système concernant l'analyse de sentiment d'un contenu (sentiment analysis; French record).
- CA 2,865,187 C – Method and system relating to salient content extraction for information retrieval.

== Research and community ==
In January 2025, Gnowit personnel contributed to regulatory NLP by co-authoring a peer-reviewed paper at the 1st Regulatory NLP Workshop (RegNLP 2025), co-located with COLING in Abu Dhabi. Titled Unifying Large Language Models and Knowledge Graphs for Efficient Regulatory Information Retrieval and Answer Generation, the work introduces PolicyInsight, a framework that joins a dynamic policy data model and knowledge graph with LLMs to monitor policy texts, detect changes, and support retrieval and answer generation; the author list includes Shahzad Khan (CEO, Gnowit Inc.). (ACL Anthology, aclweb.org). Similar information-retrieval technologies are widely used for competitive intelligence, policy monitoring, and media analysis.

== White paper ==
Gnowit has published a practical guide, Automated Government Information Monitoring, which outlines how GR and regulatory teams can design a monitoring and briefing workflow and describes Gnowit's automation features and export options (PDF, email, dashboards, CSV/JSON/XML/API).

== See also ==
- Parliamentary informatics
