= Dynamique Citoyenne =

Cameroonian civil society monitoring network

- Formation: 2005; 21 years ago
- Founded at: Yaoundé, Cameroon
- Type: Civil society network
- Purpose: Independent monitoring of public policies
- Headquarters: Yaoundé, Cameroon
- Region served: Cameroon
- National focal point: Jean Marc Bikoko

Dynamique Citoyenne is a Cameroonian civil society network that conducts independent monitoring of public policies and cooperation strategies. Founded in 2005, it brings together non-governmental organisations from across Cameroon's ten regions and is known for its scrutiny of the state's public investment budget and its advocacy for greater transparency and accountability in public management.

== History ==
The network emerged from a seminar held in Ombé, South-West Region, Cameroon, in July 2005 that brought together more than 120 organisations from Cameroon's ten regions. Its founding text, the Ombé Declaration, was formally adopted in December 2005 in Yaoundé during a mobilisation against impunity organised to mark international human rights and anti-corruption days. From 2006 the network carried out recurring analyses of the state budget and positioned itself as a leading actor in citizen-led monitoring of public policies, cooperation strategies and budget execution.

== Activities ==
Dynamique Citoyenne describes itself as a network promoting active citizenship and participatory governance. Present in each region of the country, it advocates for transparency and accountability in the local management of state-allocated budgets and monitors the decentralisation process relaunched by Cameroon's 2019 general code of local authorities. Its methods have included producing alternative reports, declarations and memoranda, holding press conferences, taking part in consultative frameworks with the public authorities, and monitoring the physical execution of the public investment budget.

The network has also engaged in electoral governance, observing elections and calling for reform of the electoral code; in reporting on a study by the network, Cameroonian media noted its proposal to make Elections Cameroon a joint body composed of representatives of political parties and civil society. It is associated with the international "Tournons la Page" campaign for democratic transitions in Africa.

== 2015 arrests and judicial proceedings ==
On 15 September 2015, six members of Dynamique Citoyenne, including its national focal point Jean Marc Bikoko, were arrested in Yaoundé while the network held a seminar at the Palais des Sports marking the International Day of Democracy on the theme of electoral governance and democratic alternation, during which it launched the "Tournons la Page" campaign. They were accused of holding an undeclared demonstration. The Observatory for the Protection of Human Rights Defenders, a joint programme of the FIDH and the World Organisation Against Torture, characterised the prolonged prosecution as judicial harassment intended to penalise the defenders' human rights activities, noting that they faced up to five years' imprisonment.
