= Ayanda Ngila =

South African land activist (1992–2022)

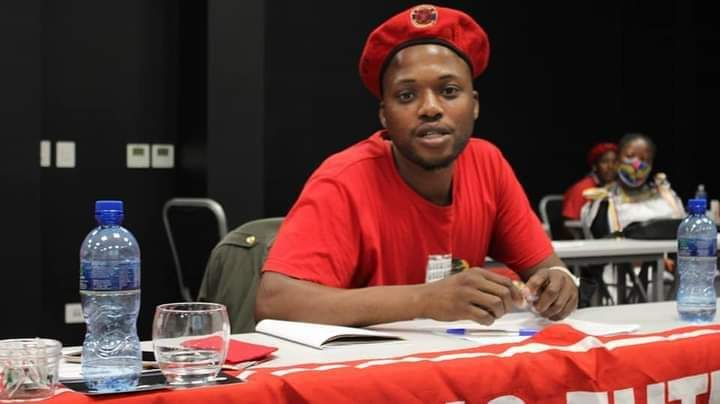
Ngila speaking at a meeting

Ayanda Ngila (1992–2022), was a land activist, a prominent leader in the shack dweller's movement Abahlali baseMjondolo and deputy chairperson of its eKhenana Commune. He was assassinated on 8 March 2022.

== Arrest ==
The eKhenana Commune, a well known branch of the social movement Abahlali baseMjondolo, has been the target of repression for many years. In March 2021, Ngila along with three other leaders of the movement, Lindokuhle Mnguni, Landu Shazi and Maphiwe Gasela, were arrested and charged with murder. They were held without bail for six months. While in prison Ngila participated in a reading group that read work by thinkers like Paulo Freire and Frantz Fanon.

The state withdrew charges against all four leaders on 1 October 2021 after admitting that it had no evidence against any of them. The arrests were part of a string of arrests of other Abahlali baseMjondolo leaders including Nokuthula Mabaso and Mqapheli Bonono, which have widely been referred to as politically motivated.

Retired Anglican bishop for KwaZulu-Natal, Rubin Phillip, reacted with concern at what he deemed to be another instance of false arrest of Abahlali baseMjondolo members. The Socio-Economic Rights Institute criticised the National Prosecuting Authority for not ensuring that Ngila and his co-accused received their constitutional right to a speedy bail application process. University of Johannesburg professor Jane Duncan noted the way the criminal justice system was being abused to break the community.

== Assassination ==
Ngila was assassinated on 8 March 2022 by four attackers, while on his way to fix a water pipe at the eKhenana Commune, in Cato Manor, Durban, South Africa. His murder, which also targeted the settlement's chairperson, Lindokuhle Mnguni, is said to have been carried out by hit-men linked to the local taxi industry and local political leaders in the African National Congress.

Khaya Ngubane, the son of a local ANC politician, was later arrested for Ngila's murder. Nokuthula Mabaso, a state witness in Ngila's assassination was herself shot and killed on 5 May 2022. After Mabaso was killed, Ngubane was denied bail. On 20 August 2022 the second key witness in Ngila's murder, Lindokuhle Mnguni was also assassinated.

== Reaction ==
The assassination was widely condemned by South African and internationally including in a widely publicised letter from over 130 civil society organisations. Prominent public interest law firm, the Socio-Economic Rights Institute of South Africa (SERI), called on the Minister of Police and the South African Human Rights Commission to investigate his assassination.

The international human rights organisations that issued statements of concern included the Kairos Center in New York, the Habitat International Coalition, the International Network for Economic, Social and Cultural Rights and Frontline Defenders.

The assassination of Abahlali baseMjondolo activists, including Ngila, was discussed at the 51st session of the United Nations Human Rights Council in 2022.

The assassination was also condemned by a host of popular organisations across Africa including the eSwatini republican movement PUDEMO whose leader attended Ngila's funeral, the Socialist Movement of Ghana, the South African Federation of Trade Unions as well as the largest trade union in the country, the National Union of Metalworkers of South Africa.

== Conviction of the assassin ==
On 17 July 2023, Khayalihle Gwabuzela (known as Khaya Ngubane), was found guilty of the murder of Ngila in the Durban High Court. He was handed down a sentence of fifteen years imprisonment. Ngubane is the son of an ANC politician.

== See also ==
- Abahlali baseMjondolo
- Lindokuhle Mnguni
- List of assassinated human rights activists
- List of unsolved murders (2000–present)
- Nokuthula Mabaso
- Political assassinations in post-apartheid South Africa
- Political repression in post-apartheid South Africa
