= Nokuthula Mabaso =

Assassinated resident of Cato Manor, South Africa

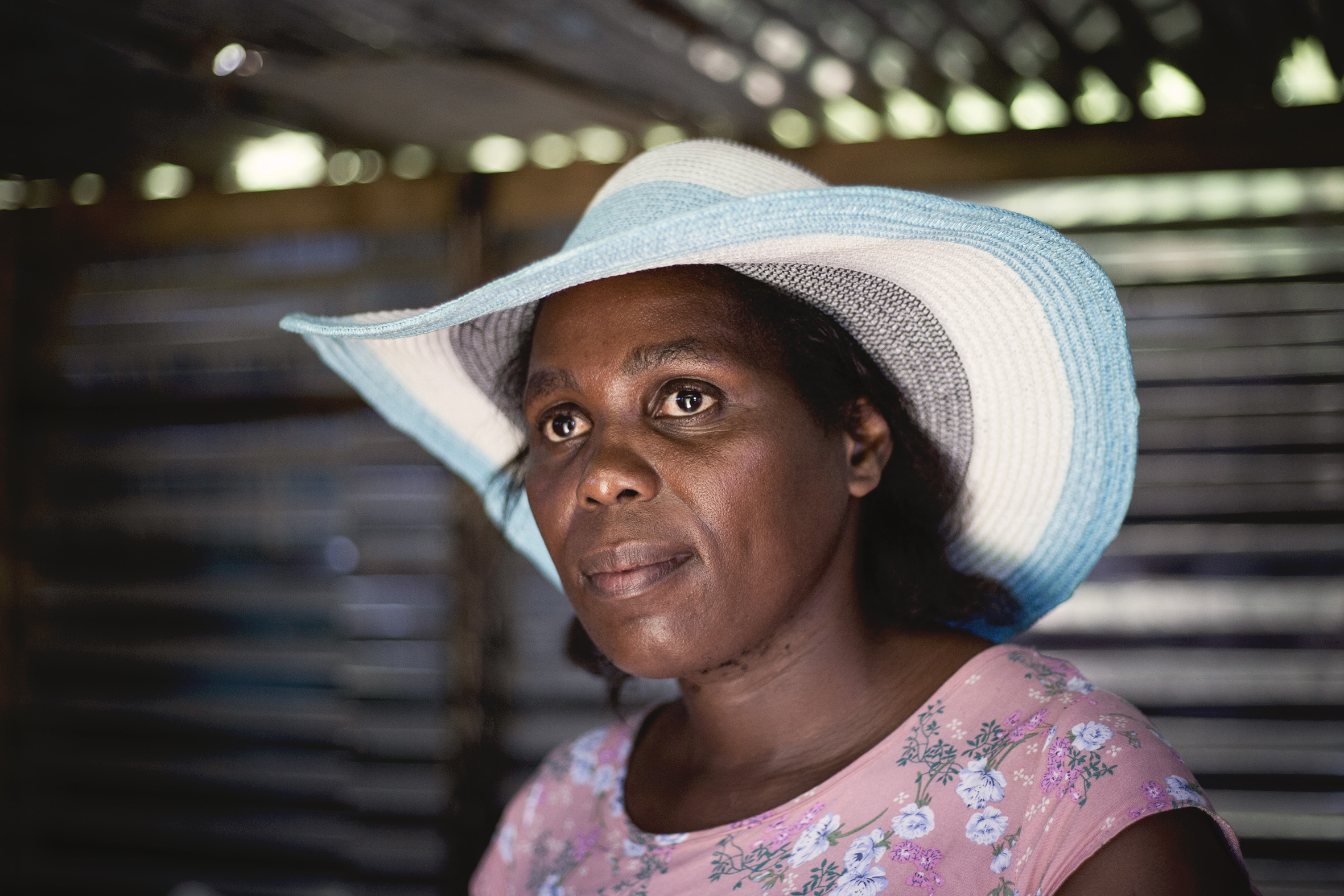

Nokuthula Mabaso (1981/1982 – 5 May 2022) was a prominent leader in Abahlali baseMjondolo and one of the leaders of its women's league. She was a leader in the eKhenana Commune. She was assassinated on 5 May 2022.

== Activism ==
She was instrumental in developing the Commune's food sovereignty project.

In April 2020 she successfully interdicted the eThekwini Municipality against carrying out illegal evictions against the residents of eKhenana.

Mabaso opposed the commodification of land and explained that in eKhenana "We made a collective decision that we would not sell or lease any piece of land here in eKhenana."

== Arrest ==
On 8 October 2021 she was arrested along with Thozama Mazwi and Sindiswa Ngcobo, all members of the eKhenana branch of Abahlali baseMjondolo. The arrests were part of a spate of arrests of about a dozen movement members and were widely seen as politically motivated. All charges were later dropped.

== Assassination ==
Mabaso was assassinated in the presence of her children in her home at the eKhenana Commune, in Cato Manor, Durban, South Africa on 5 May 2022 . She left behind a husband and four children. She was shot seven times.

Two months before she was murdered she had witnessed the assassination by five gunmen of Ayanda Ngila, also a leader in the eKhenana Commune. The movement Abahlali baseMjondolo claims that she was murdered because of her activism and specifically after she decided to become a state witness fingering Khaya Ngubane as one of the perpetrators. She was laid to rest at her family home at Esidumbini near Tongaat. After Mabaso was killed, Khaya Ngubane was denied bail in the Ngila case.

On the 26 July 2022, a pastor named Samson Ngubane (who leads a Zionist church in Mayville) as well as his brother Mhlanganyelwa Ngubane, who are also the father and uncle of Khaya Ngubane, were arrested for their involvement in Mabaso's assassination. On 6 September 2022, both accused were denied bail.

== Responses to the assassination ==
Following the assassination of Mabaso and two other activists in eKhenana - Ayanda Ngila and Lindokuhle Mnguni - the killings were condemned in a letter from over 130 civil society organisations. The assassination of Abahlali baseMjondolo activists was also discussed at the 51st sessions of the United Nations Human Rights Council in 2022.

== See also ==
- Abahlali baseMjondolo
- Ayanda Ngila
- Lindokuhle Mnguni
- List of unsolved murders (2000–present)
- List of assassinated human rights activists
- Political assassinations in post-apartheid South Africa
- Political repression in post-apartheid South Africa
