= Bandile Mdlalose =

Community activist in South Africa against landlessness

Bandile Mdlalose - Deputy Secretary General of Civil Society Unmuted Coalition S.A, elected on the National Conference of CSUCSA in 2024 at Birtchwood Hotel Bandile Mdlalose is a former general secretary of the South African shackdwellers' movement Abahlali baseMjondolo. She is now the President of the Community Justice Movement which operates in some informal settlements of Gauteng and KwaZulu Natal.

She was the National Working Committee member of the United Front, elected in December 2014. She was listed in the Mail & Guardian Book of Women for 2012 and was labeled one of South Africa's top 20 youth in 2013.

== Arrest in 2013 ==
In October 2013, Bandile Mdlalose was arrested on a charge of public violence at the Marikana land occupation in Durban. Abahlali baseMjondolo and commentators labeled the arrest as politically motivated and without merit.

She was arrested when she went to show solidarity with the family of 17-year-old Nqobile Nzuza, who was killed in the protests. She was held at Cato Manor police station; groups such as Amnesty International and War on Want petitioned for her release.

She had difficulty getting bail set but eventually was granted bail of R5,000 on the condition that she not return to Cato Crest.

== Philosophy ==
Bandile Mdlalose wrote that South Africans "live in a Democratic Prison" because democracy sends police and private security to evict poor people and "smash" their struggles. She also wrote an article after her arrest called "Seven days in Prison".

Normally, it is seen that the poor are poor in mind and that everything needs to be thought for us. But poverty is not stupidity, it is a lack of money. And we always remind people that the same system that made the rich rich has made the poor poor. We are still fighting to insist that there should be nothing for us without us. No one has a right to make decisions for us while we still have a mouth and mind to use.

She is also critical of electoral politics and has argued that: "Once you become a political party or when you contest the elections, you then become like them (the politicians)."
