= Mitchell's Plain land occupation =

On 14 May 2011 the Mitchells Plain Backyarders' Association occupied two pieces of land in Kapteinsklip and Swartklip in Mitchells Plain. About 5,000 people participated in the occupation.

== Outcomes ==
There was a violent clash between occupiers and the police. Fourteen people were arrested. Following the occupation there were a number of protest in defense of the occupation. An eviction order was served on the occupiers and they were denied leave to appeal. One of the occupiers Faiza Meyer was quoted as saying "I have been living on [this] land for four months, so what if we have this beautiful Constitution, it means nothing." The anti-land invasion unit destroyed the occupation. It was reported that the Anti-Land Invasion Unit acted with considerable violence that resulted in breaking Christen De Jager's leg.

== Video ==
- Mitchells Plain land invasion and police response, Bush Radio News Clip on the Occupation and the Police Response,
