= EKhenana Commune =

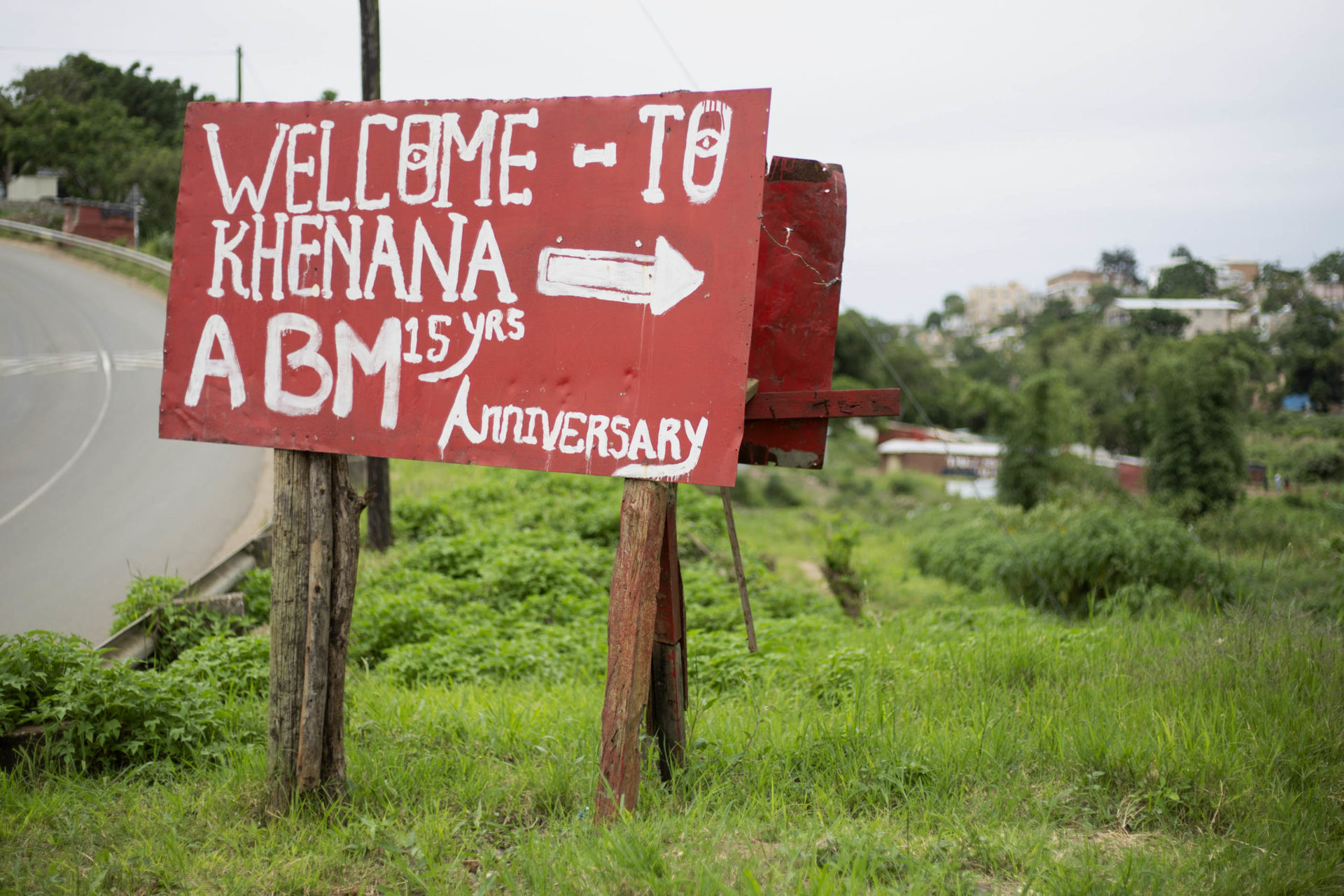
A sign points towards the eKhenana land occupation in Cato Manor, Durban.

The eKhenana Commune (English: Canaan Commune) is a prominent land occupation in the historic working-class area of Cato Manor in Durban, South Africa. According to the Socio-Economic Rights Institute "The eKhenana settlement is organised as a cooperative in which residents collectively run a communal kitchen and tuck shop, theatre, poetry and music projects, and care for a vegetable garden named after the late Nkululeko Gwala [assassinated in 2013] as well as a poultry farm named in honour of the late S’fiso Ngcobo [assassinated in 2018]. The Commune has solar power and is also home to a political school that residents named the Frantz Fanon School, as well as the Thuli Ndlovu Community Hall [Ndlovu was assassinated in 2014]. The Commune has suffered sustained political repression, including multiple arrests and three assassinations in 2022.

== Background ==
The land on which the settlement is located is in a small valley between formal houses with a stream running through the middle. The land was first cleared and then settled in 2018. It is one of many land occupations in the Cato Manor and Cato Crest area which lay vacant for many years after apartheid-era forced removals. The forced removals from Cato Manor are considered the Durban equivalent of the internationally better known forced removals from District Six in Cape Town and Sofiatown in Johannesburg. Like many occupations in Durban, eKhenana has been subject to a number of attempted evictions by municipal Law Enforcement as well as government-hired private security services. This continued despite an interdict being secured against the demolitions.

== Political Affiliation ==
In April 2019, residents of the settlement became members of Abahlali baseMjondolo, the largest independent social movement in South Africa, and set up a branch of the movement at the occupation.

== Commune ==
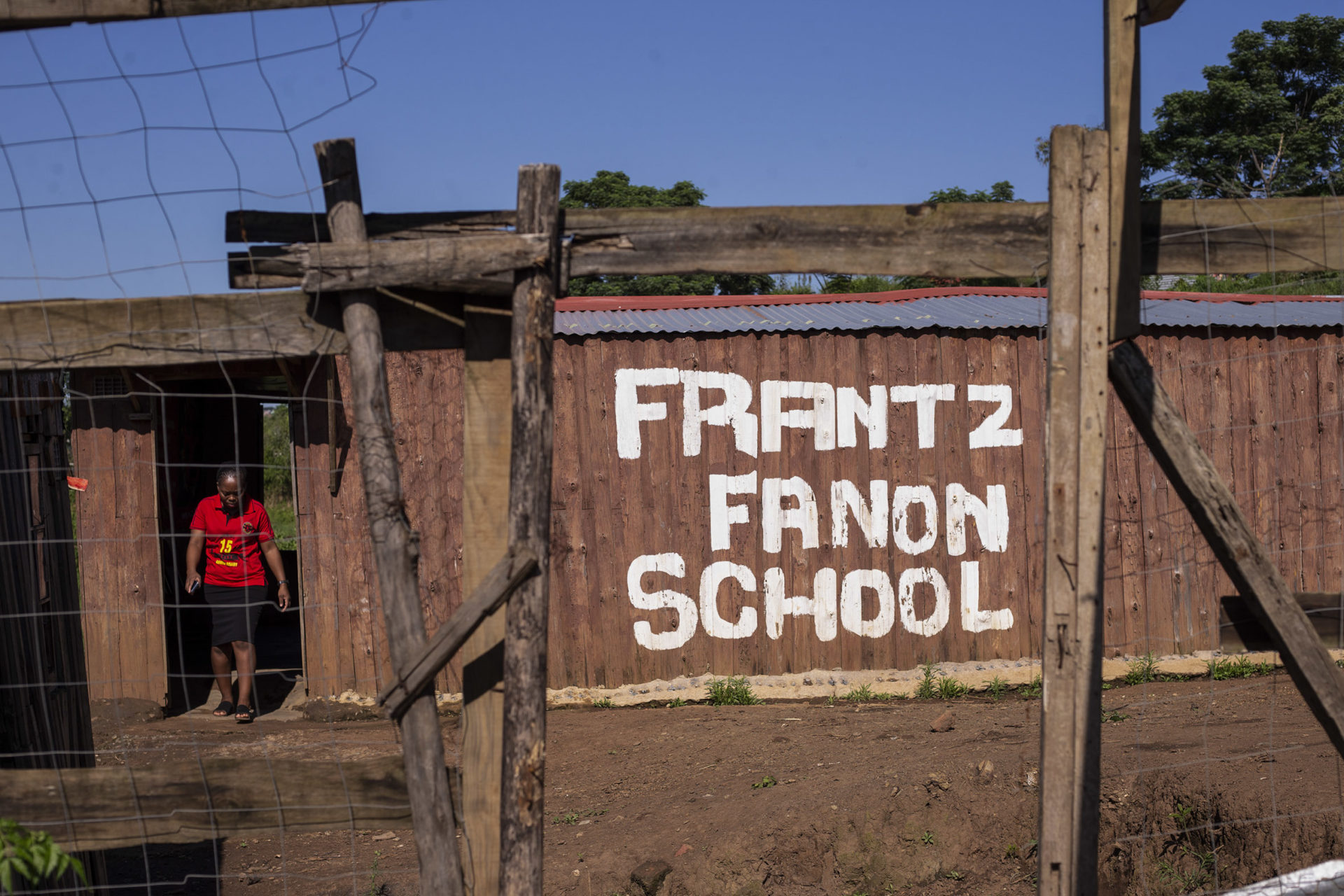
The Frantz Fanon School at eKhenana, Durban.

Inspired by a visit by Brazil's Movimento dos Trabalhadores Rurais Sem Terra (Landless Workers Movement), the community decided to turn the settlement into a productive commune where they collectively produce and share food. They began a communal vegetable garden, a collectively run chicken farm and build a community hall and communal kitchen. They also set up a collectively run spaza shop where they sold basic items for everyday use as well as produce from the garden.

The Frantz Fanon School, a political school, was founded in 2019.

The commune and its communal garden was hard hit by the 2022 KwaZulu-Natal floods and many homes were washed away.

== Repression and assassinations ==
Since its founding, eKhenana has been subject to recurrent bouts of repression, including evictions, arrests and assassinations. This occurred even during the Covid-19 lockdown when there was a national ban on evictions. In April 2020 there were multiple evictions carried about the eThekwini municipality's Anti-Land Invasions Unit (ALIU) as well as a private security company called Calvin Family Security Services. Dozens of homes were demolished during the various operations and a least one resident sustained serious wounds after allegedly being shot by ALIU officers. This occurred despite a court order whereby the municipality agreed to refrain from further operations.

In 2021, about a dozen members of Abahlali baseMjondolo were subject to a variety of arrests related to eKhenana settlement. The settlement's chairperson, Lindokuhle Mnguni, along with two other leaders, Ayanda Ngila and Landu Shazi were arrested for murder. They were held in prison for over six months after which all charges were withdrawn after a key state witness recanted her testimony. After these arrests, Mqapheli Bonono, the deputy president of Abahlali baseMjondolo, along with eKhenana residents Maphiwe Gasela and Siniko Miya were also arrested and charged with conspiracy to murder the witness in the first case. The former two were also held for two weeks and the later was denied bail for more than six months. Their cases were also eventually dropped as well. Three more eKhenana residents and Abahlali leaders, Nokuthula Mabaso, Thozama Mazwi and Sindiswa Ngcobo, were also arrested, charged with assault and denied bail for a few weeks All these charges were later dropped as well.

Activists claim these arrests were charges trumped up as part of state-sanctioned repression against the movement. They called for an investigation into police complicity and have also, with the help of the Socio-Economic Rights Institute begun a lawsuit to claim damages from the state. Abahlali activists in eKhenana claim to be constantly under threat and under state surveillance.

On 8 March 2022, Ayanda Ngila was shot and killed by a group of men that entered the settlement. Then on 5 May 2022 Nokuthula Mabaso was shot and killed in front of her home. On 20 August in the early morning, chairperson of the commune and leader of Abahlali baseMjondolo's youth league, Lindokuhle Mnguni was also killed when two gunmen entered the settlement.

There were further arrests in November 2022.

== Responses to the assassinations ==
The assassinations have been widely condemned. They have provoked significant international responses including a collective letter from over 130 South African and international human rights organisations, and were discussed at the United Nations Human Rights Council in November 2022, where the South African government was called to account for the killings of AbM members at the Universal Periodic Review (UPR) by the UN Human Rights Council. Prior to this the UN Special Rapporteur on the Situation of Human Rights Defenders, Mary Lawlor had issued several statements of concern.

In 2022 the eKhenana Commune was collectively awarded the 'Human Rights Defender of the Year' award.
