= Informal housing =

Housing outside of official government control, regulation, or protection

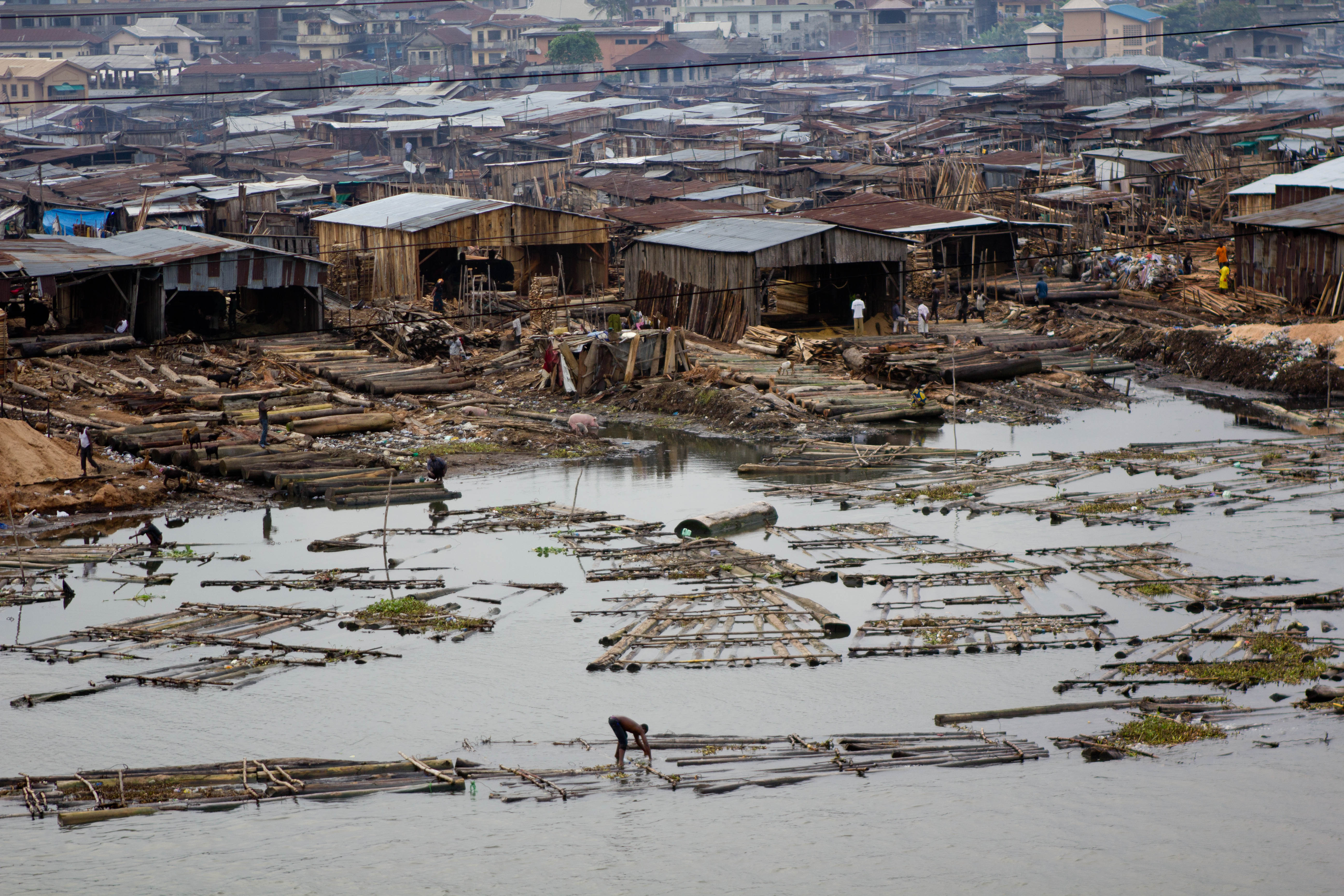
Informal housing settlement in Lagos, Nigeria

Informal housing or informal settlement can include any form of housing, shelter, or settlement (or lack thereof) which is illegal, falls outside of government control or regulation, or is not afforded protection by the state. As such, the informal housing industry is part of the informal sector.

To have informal housing status is to exist in "a state of deregulation, one where the ownership, use, and purpose of land cannot be fixed and mapped according to any prescribed set of regulations or the law". While there is no global unified law of property-ownership, the informal occupant or community will typically lack security of tenure and, with this, ready or reliable access to civic amenities (potable water, electricity and gas supply, road creation and maintenance, emergency services, sanitation and waste collection). Due to the informal nature of occupancy, the state will typically be unable to extract rent or land taxes.

The term "informal housing" is useful in capturing the informal population other than those living in slum settlements or shanty towns. UN-Habitat more narrowly defines slum housing as lacking at least one of the following criteria: durability, sufficient living space, safe and accessible water, adequate sanitation, and security of tenure.

Common categories or terms associated with informal housing include: slums, shanty towns, squats, homelessness, backyard housing and pavement dwellers.

== In developing countries ==
People all around the world face issues of homelessness and insecurity of tenure. However, particularly pernicious circumstances may obtain in developing countries, leading to a large proportion of the population resorting to informal housing. According to Saskia Sassen, in the race to become a "global city" with the requisite state-of-the-art economic and regulatory platforms for handling the operations of international firms and markets, radical physical interventions in the fabric of the city are often called for, displacing "modest, low-profit firms and households". Persistent conflict and insecurity can also weaken the institutions that would record and formalize housing transactions. For instance, until 1991, municipal officials possessed a registry of land in Mogadishu, Somalia. But these records are now held by a diasporic Somali living in Sweden, who charges a fee to verify land deeds.

If households lack the economic resilience to repurchase in the same area or to relocate to a place that offers similar economic opportunity, they are prime candidates for informal housing. For example, in Mumbai, India, fast-paced economic growth, coupled with inadequate infrastructure, endemic corruption and the legacy of restrictive tenancy laws have left the city unable to house the estimated 54% who now live informally. Informal housing is often built incrementally, as householders acquire the resources, time and security to build additions and enhancements.

Many cities in the developing world are experiencing a rapid increase in informal housing, driven by mass migration to cities in search of employment or fleeing from war or environmental disaster. According to Robert Neuwirth, there are over 1 billion (one in seven) squatters worldwide. If current trends continue, this will increase to 2 billion by 2030 (one in four), and 3 billion by 2050 (one in three). In African cities, between half and three-quarters of new housing is developed on informally acquired land. Informal homes, and the often informal livelihoods that accompany them, are set to be defining features of the cities of the future.

== In developed countries ==
Informal housing can also be found in developed countries like the United States. Unpermitted secondary units are seen as informal housing. In 2012, among the total stock of approximately 462,000 single-family homes in Los Angeles, California, there were estimated to be close to 50,000 unpermitted secondary units.

== See also ==
- Affordable housing
- Informal economy
- Right to housing
- Subsidized housing
