= Rali Mampeule =

South African entrepreneur

- Born: Ralebala Matome Mampeule; 22 December 1979 (age 46); Mokwasele village, Modjadji, South Africa
- Education: Harvard University
- Occupation: Entrepreneur
- Known for: Real estate investor, founder and CEO of the African Housing and Infrastructure Fund (AHIF) and a member of Forbes Real Estate Council
- Board member of: African Housing and Infrastructure Fund, MetroFibre Networx (MFN), Global Surgery Foundation (GSF): Transitional High-Level Council, Mampeule Foundation, University of Johannesburg Research Centre
- Spouse: Makentse Mampeule
- Children: 2

Rali Mampeule is a South African entrepreneur and philanthropist. He is the founder of the African Housing and Infrastructure Fund (AHIF) and the founding donor of the Global Surgery Foundation (GSF).

Rali Mampeule was the first black South African to own a real estate agency in South Africa. He is also a member of Forbes Real Estate Council.

== Early life ==
Rali Mampeule was born on 22 December 1979 in Mokwasele village, Modjadji and grew up in Daveyton township in Benoni, South Africa . He attended his secondary education at Rand Park High School then attained a Bachelor of Commerce degree from the University of South Africa then an Advanced Management Development Program (AMPD) in real estate from Harvard University .

== Career ==
Rali started his career in 2001 as a street hawker selling boerewors rolls while studying a Bachelor of Commerce degree through UNISA. He then met estate agent Paul Everitt, son of Charles Everitt, the founder of Chas Everitt International property group, who then assisted him to start his career as a real estate agent assistant at Chas Everitt International Property Group in Brynston, Johannesburg later that year. In 2004, he acquired a Chas Everitt franchise in Midrand, making him the first black real estate top executive in South African history. Rali was a contributor to the South African Property Transformation Charter in 2006.

Rali Mampeule founded South African Housing and Infrastructure Fund in 2019 to assist the South African government in addressing the country's housing deficit. The fund is currently valued at $1 Billion. He has sat at the Real Estate Industry Regulator the Estate Agents Affairs Board (EAAB). In 2019, Rali became the first South African to join the Forbes Real Estate Council. He was appointed chairman of the University of Johannesburg Research Center (SMaCT) in April 2022.

== Recognition ==
In 2005 Nedbank awarded Rali Mampeule with the Young Lion Award, and in 2006/2007 he was also awarded the Property Professional of the Year Award . In 2008 he was awarded the African Heritage Society (AHS) Emerging Entrepreneur of the Year.

In 2019 Rali was awarded the Socio-Economic Impact Award by the South African Institute of Black Property Practitioners (SAIBPP). In 2023, he was also recognized as a Business Leader in the Top 100 Property Leaders by the SAIBPP, then in the same year he was also awarded BBQ South African Community Builder of the Year Award.

Rali Mampeule is known for contributing to the real estate industry in South Africa through various initiatives, including his partnering with the University of Johannesburg to introduce the first earthquake resilient 3D-printed concrete homes in South Africa in 2023.

== Philanthropy ==
Rali Mampeule together with Makentse Mampeule established The Mampeule Foundation in 2019. The organisation is a non-profit organisation in South Africa known to offer assistance in property education, global health, local community development, and bursaries for tertiary education.
