= Informal housing in South Africa =

An informal settlement is defined as an unplanned settlement on land that has not been surveyed or proclaimed for residential use, consisting mainly of informal dwellings. Statistics South Africa figures put roughly 12 to 14% of the population, or about one in seven South Africans, living in such dwellings, concentrated mainly around the country's major cities. The Department of Human Settlements counted 4,075 informal settlements nationally in the 2024/25 financial year, up from 3,583 since 2021/22, with Gauteng (886 settlements), the Western Cape (802), and KwaZulu-Natal (621) recording the highest numbers.

== Historical origins ==
Many of South Africa's informal settlements have their origins in apartheid-era laws that restricted where Black South Africans could live and work. The Natives' Land Act of 1913 reserved close to 87% of the country's land for the white minority. Successive pass laws required every African over the age of 16 to carry a document authorising their presence outside their designated rural area. These documents ranged from the 19th century passbook to the 1952 "reference book," which were called the dompas. Failure to produce the document on demand could result in arrest. By the time the system was formally abolished in 1986, more than 17 million arrests had been made under it. The 1951 Prevention of Illegal Squatting Act gave the state power to demolish settlements and forcibly relocate residents to government-designated resettlement camps.The Group Areas Act of 1950 was used to raze racially mixed neighbourhoods including Sophiatown in Johannesburg, which was demolished and rebuilt as a whites-only suburb renamed Triomf; District Six in Cape Town, where more than 60,000 people were forcibly removed and their houses flattened by bulldozers; and South End in Port Elizabeth, where by 1965 apartheid bulldozers had demolished most of the suburb and residents were dispatched to separate areas according to their racial classification.

Despite these legal barriers, rural South Africans continued moving toward the cities in search of work, and informal settlements continued to grow under apartheid. By the early 1980s, as the government pursued mass forced removals less aggressively, squatter camps expanded rapidly on the outskirts of cities as migrants sought work with no legal way to access formal housing nearby. When influx control was lifted in 1986, urbanisation accelerated sharply. Even as the newly elected ANC government rolled out what is described as one of the largest state housing programmes in the world, the number of informal settlements is reported to have grown more than ninefold over the following two decades. One academic account of the period noted that shack-dwellers who moved to the cities "had been forcibly kept out... since at least the 1930s," and that their rapid urbanisation after 1994 was viewed by the new ANC government as a threat to its own legitimacy.

== Reasons people live in informal settlements ==
Cost is the explanation most often given in reporting and research for why people remain in informal settlements rather than move into the formal rental or ownership market. Living in an informal settlement is cheap, a shack can cost less than R2,000 to build, and apart from building materials, the only ongoing cost may be for water. By contrast, backyard-shack tenants pay rent to the owner of the main house, and face additional economic pressure, research shows that any economic decline will typically push backyard tenants out of rental and into informal settlements entirely. An estimate found only around 15% of South African households earn enough to qualify for a mortgage. Proximity to jobs is cited just as often. Imraan Baccus, interviewed on Durban's settlements, described cities as representing "hope for a large portion of the impoverished and unemployed population," even as the resulting overcrowding overwhelms local authorities.

== Living conditions and health risks ==
Residents describe daily conditions in informal settlements in stark terms. In the SST informal settlement in Cape Town's Town Two, residents told a local paper in mid-2026 that raw sewage floods their homes "almost daily," turning the community into what many described as "a living hell," forcing families to abandon belongings and shelter with relatives while the sewage "flows directly into many homes." In Khayelitsha, community leader Nosakhele Zenzile said the Harry Gwala settlement had more than 1,000 shacks served by 120 flush toilets installed by the city, of which only ten worked. "I know the number because we counted them a few days ago," she said. Resident Pumeza Naka, who lives in a one-room shack with her daughter in the BM section, said she uses a bucket at home because the toilets are blocked or vandalised.

Flooding causes similar problems. In the Themba Khoza settlement near Tembisa, a BuaNews reporter described roosters, dogs digging through mud and garbage, and "raw sewage trickling past the doorsteps of many dishevelled houses" after heavy rains. Resident Andiswa Mbangatha, who had lost her two-year-old daughter to flooding the previous October, said, "Since last year, these floods have been really terrible. They have no mercy but I guess we can't predict or question God." In Cape Town's Dunoon settlement, resident Busiswa Ntisana described a flooded shack, saying, "It's very bad. We can't go anywhere. The children are coughing. We haven't been able to sleep. We're getting sick. The water smells, it smells like sewage. We have no toilets." In Khayelitsha's Lansdown Road settlement, after a sewage pipe collapsed in December 2025, resident Zelda Makeleni said, "We left our shacks and stood on the pavement as the water flowed into our shacks throughout the night... Even if the water subsides, we can't stay in our shacks because of the unbearable stench." Another resident, Nosiviwe Matomela, who sells food from a stand to support her three children, said her shack had already burned down once in 2023, destroying everything she owned. "Now it breaks my heart that they are damaged," she said. The City of Cape Town's mayco member for water and sanitation, Zahid Badroodien, said the pipe collapse was linked to 40 shacks in the neighbouring SST settlement having been built directly on top of the sewer line, which needed to be moved before the pipe could be maintained.

Winter brings additional risks. In July 2025, South Africa's Cooperative Governance and Traditional Affairs MEC for KwaZulu-Natal, Reverend Thulasizwe Buthelezi, said nine people had died over a single weekend from winter-related incidents, including seven men suspected to have died of smoke inhalation in Pietermaritzburg after lighting an imbawula (brazier) for warmth. Johannesburg inner-city resident Mzungeni Ngcobo, describing life in the Mangolongolo settlement in Denver, said, "We try to make fires to keep warm in winter. It's not healthy to breathe in smoke in our shack but blankets are not enough. Every year fires get out of control, shacks are destroyed and people die... I see people die here every year. It's normal." A 2007 cold snap was reported to have killed at least 17 people nationally through exposure, with officials at the time noting the Centre on Housing Rights and Evictions estimate that 7.5 million South Africans lacked access to adequate housing.

Sanitation-linked illness is documented in academic research. Studies of water sources near informal settlements in Gauteng have found E. coli concentrations as high as 1,800 CFU/100mL, far exceeding national water-quality standards, attributed to raw sewage discharged directly into water bodies. A Cape Town-area study found that 93% of informal-settlement households used shared toilets, compared to 98.3% of formal-settlement households using private toilets, and found that water storage exceeding twelve hours in the home was associated with significantly higher rates of diarrhoea in children under five.

== Electricity and illegal connection ==
Access to mains electricity in informal dwellings rose from 52.3% in 2002 to 58.3% by 2023, according to Statistics South Africa, still far below the 94.6% rate in formal housing. Where legal connections are unavailable, residents frequently run illegal lines from shack to shack, often installed and profited from by others within the settlement, using wiring unsuited to building-to-building connections. In Soweto's Motsoaledi settlement, a shack owner named Themba Mabunda described losing his home and belongings, including important documents, after cables overloaded when power was restored following load reduction. "Luckily there were no kids or any person in the shack when everything started burning down," he said, calling for safer connections.

== Fire incidents ==
Fire is the danger residents describe most often. Professor Richard Walls, head of the Fire Engineering Research Unit at Stellenbosch University, said 190 people died in informal settlement fires in Cape Town in 2022. The Western Cape's Provincial Minister of Infrastructure, Tertuis Simmers, said the province registers an annual average of 1,260 fire occurrences in informal settlements. Nationally, Human Settlements Minister Thembi Simelane told Parliament that 2,860 informal structures burned down between September 2024 and February 2025 alone, 73% of them in the Western Cape, at a government relief cost of more than R99.5 million in building materials distributed to 5,454 households.

=== Incidents ===
In March 2004, a fire in Joe Slovo, Langa, Cape Town, killed at least six people and burned roughly 1,000 shacks, leaving about 4,000 people homeless, in what fire officials called the city's largest blaze since 2000.

On 1 January 2013, a wind-driven fire tore through the BM Section of Khayelitsha, killing at least five people and destroying more than 1,000 shacks, leaving over 4,000 people homeless. Fifteen-year-old resident Bongolweth Mpakama said he had "never seen anything like the ferocity of the blaze that destroyed his family home within minutes."

In September 2018, a fire in eziNkomeni, Lwandle, Strand, killed an 8-month-old baby, a 13-year-old boy, and a man and woman from the same family. 28 shacks were destroyed and 44 people were left

In August 2023, five children burned to death overnight near Laudium, Pretoria, after being left alone while their mothers were reportedly at a tavern.

In September 2024, a fire in Cemetery View, Pretoria, destroyed more than 800 homes and affected about 2,600 residents, killing one person and critically injuring two others. The same settlement had already lost around 400 shacks in March 2022 and 300 in August 2023.

In May 2025, six members of one family, including two toddlers aged 18 months and four years, burned to death in their sleep in the Marikana informal settlement, KwaThema, Boksburg. Only a seven-year-old girl survived, with critical burns. Her grandfather, Peter Phahla, said, "I never imagined that one day I would have to bury my own daughter... It's painful to lose six people at one go." Minister Simelane called the deaths "a clear sign that we should accelerate and invest in the upgrading of informal settlements."

In December 2025, a mother, Asavela Seti, and her three children burned to death in Siyahlala, Langa, Cape Town. Neighbours said they heard the family's screams but could not reach them in time. Resident Siyabonga Ntshangase said, "My cousin woke me up to say that the house was burning. We could not save anything." Another resident, Mthuthuzeli Vika, said he still hears "the sounds of the children and their mother screaming for help." A second fire the same day destroyed ten more shacks in the nearby Joe Slovo settlement.

In May 2025, two young children died in a winter fire in Bishop Lavis, Cape Town, that left more than 120 people across multiple settlements homeless.

In July 2026, one person died and about 60 shacks were destroyed in a fire in the Malacca Road informal settlement, Red Hill, Durban. It was the second deadly fire in the settlement in three years, after a woman was electrocuted on an illegal connection during a March 2023 blaze.

== Government and legal response ==
=== Housing delivery ===
The Reconstruction and Development Programme (RDP), launched in July 1994, promised a million houses within five years and became, by some official accounts, the largest state-subsidised housing programme in the world. By various government figures, somewhere between roughly 3 million and nearly 5 million subsidised houses had been delivered by the mid-2020s, benefiting an estimated 20 million people. The housing backlog has not closed. It was put at around 1.3 to 1.5 million units in 1994 and estimated at 2.1 to 2.4 million units in more recent years, with annual delivery reported to have fallen from about 75,000 units in 2019 to around 25,000 in 2023. Nomnikelo Sigenu, secretary of the shack-dwellers' movement Abahlali baseMjondolo, described a Gauteng housing project left unfinished 30 years after it was promised. "Empty promises are what the government is good at. We can protest, march or do anything but all they will do is just give empty promises — especially now because elections are coming," she said. A separate backlog of unissued title deeds, more than 900,000 nationally, leaves many RDP homeowners without secure legal ownership.

=== Evictions and demolitions ===
The Prevention of Illegal Eviction from and Unlawful Occupation of Land Act of 1998 (PIE Act) requires a court order before anyone can be lawfully evicted, replacing the apartheid-era Prevention of Illegal Squatting Act. In practice many cities including Cape Town, Johannesburg and eThekwini run "Anti-Land Invasion Units" that remove newly erected shacks, in some cases without a court order, on the argument that they are pre-empting occupation rather than evicting settled residents. The practice drew national attention in July 2020 when Bulelani Qolani was filmed being dragged naked from his home in Cape Town's Ethembeni settlement by the city's Anti-Land Invasion Unit and metro police, without a court order. The footage was widely described at the time as reminiscent of apartheid-era forced removals. Sheldon Magardie of Lawyers for Human Rights said at the time that the practice was unlawful. "The city is acting unlawfully, because if someone occupies property... one still has to get a court order or legal authority such as a by-law to do so," he said. The Anti-Land Invasion Unit's director, Hayward, disputed this. "The law is very clear on this and we will continue to abide strictly to the Prevention of Illegal Evictions from and Unlawful Occupation of Land Act, as well as the provisions of the Constitution," he said.

=== Response to disaster ===
Following the deaths in the Marikana settlement, Minister Simelane called for accelerated "upgrading of informal settlements" and completion of stalled projects under the department's 2024 to 2029 Medium-Term Development Plan, which targets upgrades to more than 4,000 settlements. After earlier fires in Cape Town's Du Noon area over the 2024 festive season, her ministry distributed more than 290 "fire kits" to affected households as part of what it described as the Housing Code of 2009's mandate to assist communities left homeless by disaster.
