= Desmond D'Sa =

South African environmentalist (1956–2026)

- Born: 13 June 1956; Cato Manor, Durban, South Africa
- Died: 29 October 2026 (aged 70); KZN South Coast, South Africa
- Awards: Goldman Prize

Desmond D'Sa (13 June 1956 – 29 October 2026) was a South African environmentalist who received the 2014 Goldman Prize.

D'Sa was known for protesting Environmental justice issues in Durban, South Africa related to access to greenspace and pollution. The region of the city where he lived is known as a "Cancer Alley" because of the 300+ industrial facilities in the area. To address this he founded the South Durban Community Environmental Alliance. That network has been successful in opposing other polluting sites, and is advocated to prevent expansion of the Port of Durban.

In 2011 his house was firebombed for his advocacy. Raised in the Apartheid era, he was inspired to integrate environmental and social justice issues in his activism.

For his work he received an honorary doctorate from the Durban University of Technology.

D'Sa died following a traffic collision on 29 October 2026, alongside two relatives. He was 70.
