= Lindokuhle Mnguni =

Land activist and leader

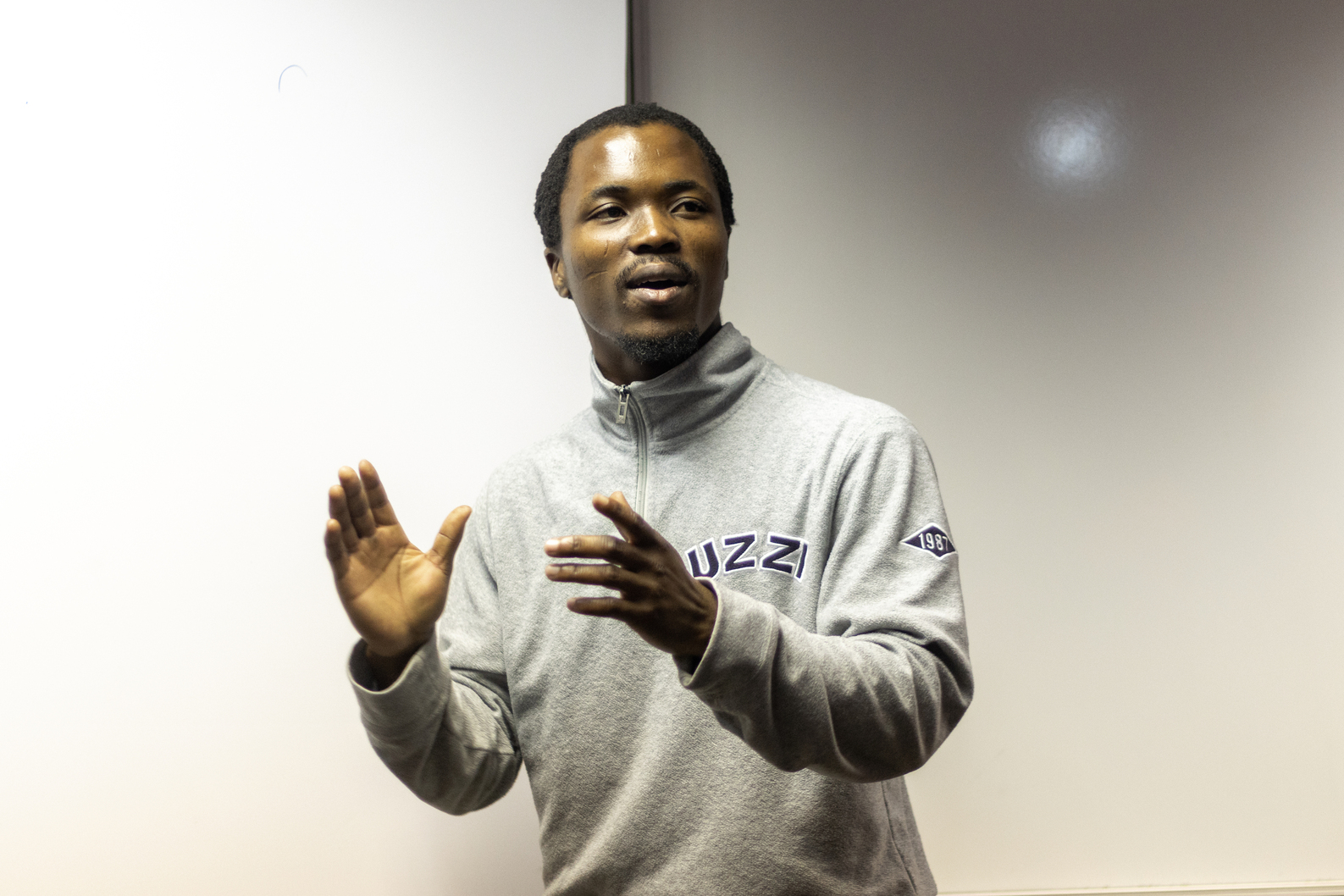
Lindokuhle Mnguni speaking at an Abahlali baseMjondolo event

Lindokuhle Mnguni (b. 1994 - August 20, 2022) was a land activist and a prominent leader in the shack dwellers' movement Abahlali baseMjondolo. He was chairperson of the movement's youth league as well as the chairperson of the eKhenana Commune. He was a leader of eKhenana's food sovereignty project which sought to make the commune more self-sustaining and independent. He was assassinated on 20 August 2022.

== Politics ==
Mnguni self-identified as a communist, a pan-Africanist and a feminist. He opposed xenophobia. Inspired by the Landless Workers' Movement (MST) in Brazil, Mnguni sought to develop an educational programme for the commune that centred around food sovereignty, sustainable development and a model of democratic self-organisation of the poor.

== Arrests and repression against eKhenana ==
The eKhenana Commune has been the target of repression since its founding in 2018. In March 2021, Lindokuhle Mnguni was arrested and charged with murder along with three other leaders of the movement, Ayanda Ngila, Landu Shazi and Maphiwe Gasela. They were held without bail for over six months. However charges were eventually withdrawn on 27 September 2021, when the sole witness, Mabongi Luthuli, recanted her accusations and admitted to lying under oath.

Along with these arrest, a number of other leaders in Abahlali baseMjondolo were arrested, including Maphiwe Gasela, Siniko Miya, Nokuthula Mabaso, Thozama Mazwi and Sindiswa Ngcobo and, most notably, the deputy president of the movement, Mqapheli Bonono. The cases have been referred to as "bogus" and politically motivated. All cases against AbM members were eventually dropped for lack of evidence. A number of further attacks on movement members in eKhenana, including assault and arson, were said to have occurred later that year including attacks on movement leaders, including Mnguni.

As a result, the Socio-Economic Rights Institute (SERI) began litigation to sue the state for damages in relation to the unlawful arrest and malicious prosecution of Mnguni and other movement leaders.

Speaking at a public event in June 2022, two months before he was assassinated, Mnguni said "their strategy to keep us behind bars is not working and the only choice they will be left with is to kill us, but we won’t stop...They will kill us. We even said, ‘it is socialism or death!’ because we want it. No matter what it takes, even if it means death, because we can’t continue living in these inhumane conditions.”

== Assassination ==
On 8 March 2022, while on his way to fix a water piple, four attackers entered the eKhenana Commune and attempted to assassinate Lindokuhle Mnguni. He escaped unharmed. However the deputy chairperson of the Commune, Ayanda Ngila, was killed by the hitmen who are said to be linked to the local taxi industry and local political leaders in the African National Congress. Mnguni was a state witness to Ngila's murder.

On 20 August 2022, in the early morning, Lindokuhle Mnguni was killed when two gunmen entered the settlement. The gunmen searched for Mnguni at the community hall and communal kitchen before eventually finding him and his partner asleep inside his home. They fired 13 shots, killing Mnguni and critically injuring his partner who eventually survived. The search and assassination were caught on CCTV cameras that had been installed after the death of Ngila and Nokuthula Mabaso.

== Reaction ==
The assassination was widely condemned, including by the largest trade union in South Africa, the National Union of Metalworkers of South Africa who described Mnguni as "a brilliant thinker, proud communist and internationalist", the South African Human Rights Commission, as well as over 130 other civil society organisations. It was discussed at the 51st session of the United Nations Human Rights Council in 2022.

== See also ==
- List of unsolved murders (2000–present)
- Political assassinations in post-apartheid South Africa
- Political repression in post-apartheid South Africa
- List of assassinated human rights activists
