= Death of Nqobile Nzuza =

Shack dweller shot by a police officer at age 17

Nqobile Nzuza was a resident in the Marikana Land Occupation in Cato Crest, which is part of Cato Manor in Durban, South Africa. She was a member of the shack dwellers' movement Abahlali baseMjondolo.

== Death ==
On 30 September 2013, at the age of 17 years, Nzuza died when a police officer shot her in the back of her head during an anti-eviction protest organised by Marikana residents. She was the third member of Abahlali baseMjondolo killed that year. The Independent Police Investigative Directorate (IPID) later opened a case of murder against the Cato Manor police.

Police admitted to shooting Nzuza besides another resident who was wounded, but claimed they were acting in self-defense. Representatives of Abahlali baseMjondolo said it was the fault of the police.

== Aftermath ==
The death caused significant controversy. When Bandile Mdlalose, then General Secretary of Abahlali baseMjondolo, visited Nzuza's family, she was arrested. There were a range of letters and statements on the matter by well-known US based academics such as Noam Chomsky and Anglican Bishop Rubin Phillip.

Chomsky wrote a letter to the Mail & Guardian newspaper in Johannesburg along with other signatories, which included Slavoj Zizek, Judith Butler and John Holloway. They urged Jacob Zuma, President of South Africa and James Nxumalo, the local Mayor to put an end to the violent attacks on activists and their homes.

== Conviction ==
In 2018 a Cato Manor police officer, Phumlani Ndlovu, was convicted of murder and was sentenced to ten years in prison. The trial lasted 5 years. Nzuza's family declared themselves unhappy with the verdict.

== See also ==
- Nkululeko Gwala
- Political repression in post-apartheid South Africa
- Protests in South Africa
