= Cato Manor =

- Location within KwaZulu-Natal Location within South Africa
- Coordinates: 29°52′S 30°57′E
- Country: South Africa
- Province: KwaZulu-Natal
- Municipality: eThekwini

Area
  - Total: 0.30 km^{2} (0.12 sq mi)

Population (2001)
  - Total: 5,996
  - Density: 20,000/km^{2} (52,000/sq mi)
- Time zone: UTC+2 (SAST)
- Postal code (street): 4091

Cato Manor is a settlement located 7 kilometres (4.3 mi) from the city centre of Durban, South Africa.

It was formed when Indian market gardeners came to settle in the area some time after it was given to George Christopher Cato in 1865, who was the first mayor of Durban in 1854. The area attracted attention during the Apartheid era.

== History ==
Cato Manor became recognised when Black Africans came to settle in during the 1920s, and rented land from Indian landlords who were there since the early 20th century. To earn a living, people started brewing beer and selling it in the streets of Durban to the workers. The local authorities welcomed people in town for labour but had fears of being overwhelmed by their population.

=== The Durban System ===
Local authorities then started the so-called Durban system which required permits from people who were in town to restrict the influx of population. The authorities then instituted the Native Beer Act of 1908, which allowed the municipality to brew and sell beer for self-finance. That became a success and the municipality reaped huge profits which meant that anyone brewing illegally was arrested. That started a dispute between the authorities and the people, culminating in riots.

=== Riots and Forced Removals ===
Towards the end of World War II, about 30,000 squatters had built their shacks in the place, which started even bigger riots between 1949 and 1950 when the Group Areas Act was passed by the government. The apartheid government decided to forcibly remove residents from the area. People were forced to move to townships like KwaMashu and the Indians moved to places like Chatsworth and Phoenix. The forced removals from Cato Manor are considered the Durban equivalent of what took place at District Six in Cape Town and Sofiatown in Johannesburg.

On 23 January 1960, a mob attacked 4 white and 5 black policemen at the Cato Manor Police station; they killed the men and mutilated their bodies. An excerpt from An Ordinary Atrocity by Philip Frankel: "The small police force had been obliged to barricade itself in two adjacent huts which were eventually stormed by more than a thousand rioters. The more fortunate of the nine police who had died had simply been stoned to death, but there were cases of disembowelment flowing from the 'naked aggression and bloodlust of the rioters'."

== Cato Manor today ==
The area began to come to life again in the early 1980s when the Cato Manor Development Association (CMDA) was formed and delivered much-needed infrastructure. The area then was funded by private donors and the Cato Manor Area Based Management was instituted by the eThekwini Municipality to overseeing the development of the area. Cato Manor today has primary schools, a clinic, a market, and a multi-purpose center, and talks for new development are underway.

=== Housing corruption and violence ===
Cato Manor has been a site of intense contestation over housing and service delivery. This has led to a number of struggles for housing and against corruption in the area. The struggles have led to a high number of assassinations of activists and political figures in the area. In 2013, three members of the shack dweller's movement Abahlali baseMjondolo were killed including Cato Crest branch chairperson Nkululeko Gwala by unnamed gunmen and Nqobile Nzuza by a Cato Manor police officer. On 1 November 2021, Ward 101 candidate Siyabonga Mkhize was killed along with his bodyguard. His predecessor and successor, Mkhipheni Mzimuni Ngiba was later arrested for his murder. In 2022, three more prominent leaders of Abahlali baseMjondolo were killed in the eKhenana Commune. These were Ayanda Ngila, Nokuthula Mabaso and branch chairperson Lindokuhle Mnguni. A local pastor and prominent ANC members, as well as other members of his family, were arrested for these assassinations. The killings were widely condemned, including in a widely publicised letter from over 130 local and international human rights organisations.

== Notable people ==
- Desmond D'Sa, Environmentalist
- Madala Kunene, Musician
- Ronnie Govender, playwright and theatre director
- Sipho Gumede, jazz musician and composer
