= Marikana land occupation (Durban) =

Land occupation group in South Africa

Marikana Land Occupation (Durban)
- Date: 12 March 2013—present
- Location: Cato Crest area, in Durban, South Africa
- Participants: Abahlali baseMjondolo movement African National Congress eThekwini Municipality; South African Police Service
- Deaths: 15 March 2013: 1 Thembinkosi Qumbelo; 25 June 2013: 1 Nkululeko Gwala; 30 September 2013: 1 Nqobile Nzuza

Marikana Land Occupation (Durban) (South Africa)

In March 2013 around a thousand people occupied a piece of land in Cato Crest, Durban and named it Marikana after the Marikana miners' strike. Mayor James Nxumalo blamed the occupation on migrants from the Eastern Cape. He was strongly criticised for this by the shack dwellers' movement Abahlali baseMjondolo who said that "The City Hall is red with blood".

== Conflict ==
The land occupation resulted in considerable conflict. On 13 March the occupiers chased ANC councillor Mzimuni Ngiba out of his house and the general area. Later on a community leader, Thembinkosi Qumbelo, was assassinated. His murder was believed to be linked to the land occupation. A second man, unnamed in media reports, was killed in the same attack. On 25 June 2013 another activist involved in the occupation, Nkululeko Gwala, a member of the social movement Abahlali baseMjondolo was assassinated. On 30 September 2013 Nqobile Nzuza, a seventeen-year-old girl, also linked to Abahlali baseMjondolo, was shot dead (two shots in the back) by the police during a protest.

== Evictions ==
The municipality illegally evicted the occupiers on a number of occasions despite repeated court orders interdicting them from evicting. The evictions by eThekwini's Land Invasion Unit backed up by police have been violent with police shooting residents with rubber bullets. One resident of Marikana named Mngomezulu was shot in the stomach with live ammunition by the Land Invasion Unit and remained in ICU for weeks. Friends of Mngomezulu reported that they feared that he would poisoned by supporters of the local ANC councillor while in hospital.

The illegal evictions have been condemned by the South African General Council of the Bar. It has been reported that as a result of defying the courts, eThekwini municipal officials, including municipal manager Sibusiso Sithole, could face imprisonment. The Socio-Economic Rights Institute called the actions of the eThekwini municipality "criminal" saying that it "tears the fabric of our constitutional democracy."

The occupation was destroyed by the city for the 9th time on 23 December 2013.

== Arrests ==
There were a number of arrests of Abahlali baseMjondolo members during the conflict. The most prominent arrest was that of the movement's then General Secretary Bandile Mdlalose on the charge of public violence. The arrest caused a lot of controversy with commentators labeling the arrest "politically motivated" and being based on "trumped up charges".

== Response ==
Abahlali baseMjondolo organised a response to the evictions and marched in the thousands on the Durban City Hall on 15 September 2013. One of the main demands of the march was for the evictions in Cato Crest to cease.

After receiving no response to their memorandum, the movement began blocking roads and burning tyres in Cato Crest and adjacent to other shack settlements across the city of Durban claiming to be demanding "answers to all our unanswered memoranda." During one of these road blockades an unarmed 17-year-old girl, Nqobile Nzuza, was shot dead by the police.

== Court Cases ==
Abahlali baseMjondolo won cases against the provincial Minister for Human Settlements, Ravi Pillay, and the eThekwini Municipality, in both the Constitutional Court and the Durban High Court. These judgments showed the repeated evictions of the occupation to have been unlawful. Following the Constitutional Court judgment the evictions ceased.

== Online News Reports ==
- Shack dwellers claim land, ENCA, 2013 (Television)
- Rights Group Wins Major Victory Limiting Evictions, ENCA, 2015 (Television)

== See also ==
- Marikana Land Occupation (Cape Town)
- Abahlali baseMjondolo
- Political assassinations in post-apartheid South Africa
