= Mbongeleni Zondi =

Inkosi (Zulu Chief) Mbongeleni Zondi (1969 – January 22, 2009) was a Zulu chief, regent and great-grandson of Inkosi Bambatha kaMancinza, who led a Zulu rebellion against British rule in 1906. He was also a close ally of African National Congress President Jacob Zuma and a cultural patron of the ANC leadership in KwaZulu-Natal.

At 7:00 AM on January 22, 2009, Zondi was shot dead on Stimela Avenue in Durban’s Umlazi township. At the time, he lived in Msinga in the Midlands, and was visiting his sister in Umlazi. Four men arrived in an SUV; two of them opened fire on Zondi using AK-47s. At least 50 cartridges were found by eThekwini police. Three men suspected of the shooting were killed by police in separate incidents in September 2009. The fourth was arrested and went on trial in March 2010.

In his address at Zondi's funeral, held at Engome near Greytown, KwaZulu-Natal Premier Sibusiso Ndebele said:

(W)e have lost a transformational leader, an Inkosi who put his people first, and saw government as a strategic partner in the development of his area. We say farewell to this friend of peace, democracy and development.
