= Anti-Land Invasion Unit (Cape Town) =

In 2009, the Anti-Land Invasion Unit was created by the City of Cape Town in an effort to stop people from illegally attempting to occupy land. In 2011 the City stated that the unit demolished about 300 shacks each month. The Anti-Land Invasions Unit is the biggest unit in the City's law enforcement operation.

== Unlawful actions by the Unit ==
When the unit was founded its director, stated that:

Most importantly, the City will follow the letter of the law in obtaining interdicts and eviction orders. The law is very clear on this and we will continue to abide strictly to the Prevention of Illegal Evictions from and Unlawful Occupation of Land Act, as well as the provisions of the Constitution

— Hayward, Director of the Anti-Land Invasion Unit,

However, according to Sheldon Magardie of Lawyers for Human Rights the unit "is acting unlawfully". According to Magardie:

The city is acting unlawfully, because if someone occupies property, whether it is (an) illegal (occupation), or not, one still has to get a court order or legal authority such as a by-law to do so. And if there is such a by-law which allows them to demolish property without notice or fair procedure, that by-law is unconstitutional.

— Sheldon Magardie,

In May 2013 an article in The Daily Maverick claimed that the unit had acting illegally by evicting people from the Marikana Land Occupation without a court order and that City officials were justifying this in terms of a non-exist law and by lying about shacks that the unit had demolished being unoccupied. Constitutional law expert Pierre de Vos later wrote that these evictions were "Brutal, inhumane, and totally unlawful"

== Public criticism ==
Allegations of both violence and theft have been made against the unit by grassroots activists and in the media. It May 2013 it was reported that the unit demolished a pre-school in Langa under questionable circumstances. The People's Assembly has called for the unit to be disbanded.

== See also ==
- Homelessness in South Africa
- Department of Human Settlements
- Informal housing
- Public housing
- Economy of South Africa
