= Policy monitoring =

Policy monitoring comes a range of activities describing and analyzing the development and implementation of policies, identifying potential gaps in the process, outlining areas for improvement, and holding policy implementers accountable for their activities.

== Definition ==
Monitoring policy development and implementation is an integral component of the policy cycle and can be applied in sectors including agriculture, health, education, and finance. Policy monitoring can improve policy information among stakeholders, and the use of evaluation techniques to provide feedback to reframe and revise policies. Waterman and Wood derived policy monitoring from agency theory, describing a process where policymakers monitor the actions of their bureaucratic agents who implement and enforce policies. This monitoring allows policymakers to compensate for their agents’ greater knowledge of the policy process, and enables them to be well-informed decision makers. Thus policy monitoring allows policymakers and interested actors to systematically examine the process of creating a policy, implementing it, and evaluating its effects. Policy monitoring activities can be used to collect and analyze data related to the development and implementation of specific policies. It can also help link policies to specific outcomes and help identify and evaluate policy impacts. Policy impacts can include specific changes in behavior (e.g., increased number of people wearing seatbelts), finances (e.g., increased tax revenue), health status or epidemiology (e.g., reduced number of new HIV infections) or other social indicators (e.g., reduced crime rates, reduced levels of pollution). Data from policy monitoring can be used to support advocacy efforts and guide the development of new, timely, and relevant policies. Policy monitoring should also include the identification of operational policy barriers that can be addressed through policy and program reform, and findings can support improved implementation of existing policies.

== Challenges ==
Numerous actors and stakeholders can influence the movement of policy from inception to implementation. Well-maintained documentation and review of all key stakeholders involved in a policy can help advocates for a given policy—such as military reform, water rights, or disability legislation—prepare to address different ideologies, capacities, or interests of key actors. Limiting stakeholder analysis only to government and official policymakers may ignore major groups that can support policy development. Policy monitoring coalitions should agree on what they are monitoring and be succinct in their recommendations to policymakers. Policy initiatives themselves are often controversial, and policy monitoring can be contentious because it shows how well policy implementers and enforcers are doing their jobs. Those conducting policy monitoring should be thorough in their data collection and unbiased in their presentation of facts. Robust trainings on policy monitoring work can help organizations be systematic and effective in their policy monitoring efforts.

== Existing Models and Frameworks for Policy and Advocacy Monitoring ==
=== PEPFAR ===
The United States President's Emergency Plan for AIDS Relief (PEPFAR)’s Monitoring Policy Reform tool outlines the progression of policy development related to HIV from problem identification to monitoring and evaluation. The tool supports a relatively simple and uniform monitoring process which can be applied to any policy area. This tool can guide policy monitoring efforts throughout the policy reform process.

PEPFAR's six stages of the policy reform process:

Stage 1: Identify baseline policy issues by conducting situation assessment

Stage 2: Engagement of stakeholders in developing common policy agenda

Stage 3: Develop policy

Stage 4: Official government endorsement of policy

Stage 5: Implementation of policy

Stage 6: Evaluation of policy implementation (PEPFAR)

=== Food and Agriculture Organization Working Cycle for Country Approach ===
The FAO's Food and Agriculture Policy Decision Analysis (FAPDA) is a policy monitoring tool that provides a working cycle technique to identify policy problems and improve analysis of policy issues. By incorporating FAPDA outputs, such as a web-based tool, country policy review, and policy analysis report, policy dialogue can be more systematic and encompass different actors interested in FAPDA data.

The cycle includes:

Phase 1: Preparatory Phase
Phase 2: Focal Point Training
Phase 3: Policy Identification
Phase 4: Quality Control and Validation
Phase 5: 1st Discussion Focus of Analysis
Phase 6: Analysis
Phase 7: 2nd Discussion on Findings (FAO)

=== World Health Organization ===
The World Health Organization has started to develop dedicated monitoring systems for policy interventions on the social determinants of health that improve health equity, such as social protection and gender equity policies.

=== Gender ===
Policy monitoring can be performed through different issue-driven lenses, such as gender sensitivity or gender equality. Gender-sensitive policy monitoring analyzes any gender aspects of a policy or policy issue, and considers the impact of the policy on both men and women, as well as its impact on gender relations. For example, a policy that is shown to have improved the welfare of a household may not necessarily affect all household members positively or equally, and may have even exacerbated gender inequity. Gender-sensitive policy monitoring can help advance gender equity and improve policy implementation. Civil society and other stakeholders can use policy monitoring techniques to systematically gather data on the gender aspects of policies and use these data to influence policymakers to favor gender-equitable health policies¬¬¬—these processes are essential to facilitating gender mainstreaming.

== Application ==
A 2012 study analyzed planned policy interventions across the 22 publicly accessible PEPFAR Partnership Frameworks to understand how the interventions are related to PEPFAR and country or regional priorities. The study found that “policy monitoring by donors, partner country governments, and civil society stakeholders can help measure whether policy interventions are occurring as planned in order to further HIV prevention, care, and treatment and health system goals and, if not, can point to needed changes."
