= Nkululeko Gwala =

Assassinated resident of Cato Crest, South Africa

Nkululeko Gwala (died 2013) originally from Inchanga in KwaZulu Natal, was a resident of Cato Crest, which is part of Cato Manor in Durban, and a supporter of the Marikana Land Occupation (Durban). He was also a prominent member of the shackdwellers' movement Abahlali baseMjondolo and chairperson of their Cato Crest Branch. He was assassinated on 26 June 2013.

== Activism ==
In the wake of the assassination of Thembinkosi Qumbelo, a prominent ANC housing activist in Cato Crest, Nkululeko Gwala came to the forefront as the primary leader of that community. He, along with Cato Crest community members then decided to leave the ANC and join the shack-dweller's movement Abahlali baseMjondolo. He then became a leading figure in the struggle against housing corruption in the area which resulted in him being targeted by the ANC.

== Death ==
Gwala was assassinated on 26 June 2013 after unnamed gunmen opened fire and he was shot 12 times. This was following a controversial community meeting with eThekwini Mayor James Nxumalo and ANC regional chairperson Sibongeseni Dhlomo in which Mr Gwala was singled out as a trouble maker. Abahlali baseMjondolo claims that Dhlomo also announced at the meeting that Mr Gwala would be "sorted out".

The movement says Nkululeko Gwala was assassinated for exposing corruption in Cato Crest and that the community knows the identity of the gunman who they say also killed housing activist Thembinkosi Qumbelo. They claim the gunmen are associated with a local ANC councillor named Ngiba. No one was ever arrested for Gwala's assassination. However, nine years later, Councillor for Ward 101, Mkhipheni Mzimuni Ngiba, was arrested for the murder of Siyabonga Mkhize who had won the ward, displacing Ngiba from that position.

Gwala was buried in his home town of Inchanga in a politically charged funeral.

No one has been arrested for the murder of Gwala.

== See also ==
- List of unsolved murders (2000–present)

== See also ==
- Abahlali baseMjondolo
- Marikana Land Occupation (Durban)
- Nqobile Nzuza
- Political assassinations in post-apartheid South Africa
- Political repression in post-apartheid South Africa
