= Marikana land occupation (Cape Town) =

2013 activist occupation

On 27 April 2013, the national public holiday of Freedom Day in South Africa which some grassroots social movements have termed UnFreedom Day, members of Abahlali baseMjondolo occupied a piece of land in Philippi, Cape Town. They named the occupation Marikana after the Marikana miners' strike. The occupation was repeatedly destroyed by the city's anti-land invasion unit. According to the Daily Maverick the occupiers were evicted on six separate occasions. Two months after the eviction 90 people were still sleeping on the site under a tent.

Cindy Ketani was quoted in Red Pepper as saying that "When they come to destroy these shacks, they show us no court orders or papers. They just pull these people out like dogs".

In 2017, the Western Cape High Court dismissed applications by the land owners to evict the residents of the Marikana occupation. The court ordered the City of Cape Town to negotiate with the landowners to purchase the land in order to meet the housing needs of the occupants.

== Unlawful Evictions ==
Abahlali baseMjondolo alleged that the evictions were violent, that their members' property was broken and stolen and that they were also unlawful as the City did not have a court order. This view was later endorsed by legal experts and an article in the Daily Maverick suggested that the City of Cape Town was making reference to a fictitious law to justify the evictions and, also, lying about the fact that the shacks had all been unoccupied before they were demolished. Constitutional law expert Pierre de Vos later wrote that these evictions were "Brutal, inhumane, and totally unlawful".

== Western Cape High Court Judgement ==
On 30 August 2017, the Western Cape High Court delivered a judgement which found that the City of Cape Town had infringed on both the landowners' constitutional right to property and the occupiers' constitutional right to housing. The court dismissed applications by the landowners to evict the occupiers ordered the City to negotiate to purchase the land. Should the negotiations fail, the City was instructed to consider expropriating the land.

Judge Chantal Fortuin wrote that the ruling was based on several considerations. These included the impossibility of enforcing evictions, and the fact that the occupants would be rendered homeless if evicted. Fortuin wrote in her judgement "it is undisputed that the City cannot provide alternative accommodation for the occupiers".

As of 2022, the City told media, "Legal processes are taking place for the transfer of property." The land was finally purchased in July of 2024, seven years after the original judgement was handed down. At that time, the City said that it would begin providing services to the Marikana settlement "after all feasibility studies have been concluded, as well as a public participation process to discuss development options".

== Ownership of the Land ==
The City of Cape Town had argued that the 2013 evictions by its ALIU were legal and did not require a court-order in part because the land was city-owned. However, this land was actually owned by two private owners. One was an individual, Iris Fischer, and the other was NTWA Dumela Investments. The land that was occupied is part of a larger parcel of 200h of land bought by NTWA Dumela Investments in 2007.

The 2017 Western Cape High Court judgement on the matter included three groups of land owners. The first was Iris Fischer, who had been living on the property since 1969, though herself and her two sons were estimated to occupy only around 5% of the land they owned at the time of the occupation. The second was a group that included Manfred Stock and NTWA Dumela Investments. The land owned by this group had been acquired in parts over approximately 40 years. The third was Copper Moon Trading, which acquired an erf in 2007.

== Online News Reports ==
- Shack dwellers ready to die for 'Marikana' land in Cape Town, ENCA, 2013 (Television)
- Paramilitary 'anti-land invasion units' celebrate South Africa's UnFreedom Day by destroying Marikana Township, KPFA.94, 2013 (Radio)
- City shows zero tolerance for 'Marikana' settlement, ENCA, 2014 (Television)

== Additional video ==
- Marikana Land Occupation, Pablo Pinedo Boveda, 1 May 2013.

== See also ==
- Marikana Land Occupation (Durban)
- Abahlali baseMjondolo
