= Attack on Kennedy Road =

Violent 2009 incident in South Africa

Kennedy Road informal settlement on map of KwaZulu-Natal

The attack on Kennedy Road in Durban, South Africa, occurred on 26 September 2009. A mob of men armed with bush knives, guns and bottles entered the Kennedy Road informal settlement searching for leaders of the shackdwellers movement Abahlali baseMjondolo (AbM). They looted shacks and threatened residents, before attacking a hall where a youth meeting was happening. Two people were killed and around a thousand were displaced. In the aftermath, AbM representatives such as S'bu Zikode went into hiding and thirteen AbM members were arrested.

The attack was immediately condemned by academics and church leaders, and Human Rights Watch and Amnesty International later expressed concerns. The trial of the Kennedy 12 experienced delays, leading the Centre for Constitutional Rights and Amnesty to raise questions about the process. In 2011, all the charges were dropped; AbM then sued the local police and the eThekwini Metropolitan Municipality. The incident is regarded as an attack by the police and the local branch of the African National Congress (ANC) against the AbM movement.

== Attack ==
In 2009, an estimated 10,000 people were living at Kennedy Road, one of many informal settlements in Durban. The shackdwellers movement Abahlali baseMjondolo (AbM) had been founded at Kennedy Road and campaigned on issues such as better sanitation, which brought it into conflict with the ruling African National Congress (ANC). On Saturday 26 September 2009, a weekend of Heritage Day events began at Kennedy Road, with an AbM youth camp. At around 22:30, a mob armed with pangas, sjamboks, guns and bottles entered the settlement. The men woke residents up by banging on their doors and made threats whilst searching for AbM leaders such as Lindela Figlan and S'bu Zikode. Figlan had received warnings that his life was in danger and was forced to hide in his shack with his wife and 3-year-old daughter. He was saved by locking his door from the outside, so it appeared that he was not at home. The mob shouted that Mpondo people were taking over the settlement from Zulu people. The police were called by residents, but did not come. At around 01:00, about fifty armed men approached the hall where the youth camp was taking place. The police came and by 03:00 the mob had dispersed. The attack was witnessed by the makers of the film Dear Mandela.

At around 03:30, the mob returned to the hall, smashing its windows and entering inside. Two people were killed in the ensuing disorder. Later, shacks belonging to members of the Kennedy Road Development Committee (KRDC) were demolished and others were looted by men shouting "Down with Abahlali! Down with the KRDC!". An estimated one thousand inhabitants fled after being threatened with violence and rape, as the violence continued into the next day. Both Figlan and Zikode (who was not present) went into hiding.

In the aftermath, nobody from the mob was arrested but thirteen members of AbM were arrested and charged with murder. Eight were granted bail and five were remanded.

== Reactions ==
On Monday 28 September, a letter from South African academics was published which condemned the attack and raised concerns that local police and ANC members had colluded with the mob. Signatories included the academics John Dugard, Steven Friedman, Marie Huchzermeyer, Martin Legassick, Michael Neocosmos and Peter Vale. Jacob Zuma, President of South Africa, was heckled when making speeches and Edwin Ronald Makue, representing the South African Council of Churches (SACC), called it "an attack on democracy".

The Congress of the People (COPE) party claimed that the two murdered men were members of their group and that they had been killed by people from the ANC. COPE was an offshoot from the ANC and there were tensions between the groups; the slogans shouted by the mob about supporting Zulu people were taken to be a coded message for supporting the ANC. The local authorities blamed vigilantes connected to Abahlali baseMjondolo for the violence. A representative of KwaZulu-Natal province said to the Mail & Guardian newspaper that the "underlying cause for the violence was criminal". The KwaZulu-Natal Department of Safety and Security held meetings at Kennedy Road for stakeholders which were condemned as unrepresentative by church leaders, AbM and the Mail & Guardian, the latter describing them as "a sham" and an "exercise in speaking with forked tongues". Internationally, intellectuals such as Noam Chomsky, Naomi Klein and Slavoj Zizek released a statement supporting AbM and groups such as Human Rights Watch and Amnesty International expressed concern about the killings.

== Court case ==
The trial of the Kennedy 12 began on 12 July 2010 at Durban High Court. Bishop Rubin Phillip of the Diocese of Natal wrote a statement of support in which he hoped for a fair judicial process. All twelve were charged with public violence and five also faced the charge of murder, with the rest accused of attempted murder. There were also other lesser charges.

The court case was delayed several times, leading to concerns that it was becoming a politicised trial. Amnesty wrote a report questioning the impartiality of the process, and the New York-based Centre for Constitutional Rights sent an urgent appeal to the United Nations Special Rapporteur on the Situation of Human Rights Defenders to ask her to investigate the attacks on Abahlali baseMjondolo and the subsequent legal process. Journalist and former political prisoner Paul Trewhela commented that the trial had lasted longer than any case under apartheid excepting the 1956 Treason Trial, saying that "the AbM trial in Durban/eThekwini is now the most graphic faultline in the struggle to preserve democratic freedoms in South Africa".

On 18 July 2011, the entire case against the Kennedy 12 was thrown out. The Durban Regional Court magistrate stated that the prosecution witnesses "contradicted their prior statements to the police during the trial. As if that was not enough, they contradicted one another" and further described them as "belligerent", "unreliable" and "dishonest". Amnesty noted that the court had found that "police had directed some witnesses to point out members of Abahlali-linked organizations at the identification parade" and that the people whose shacks had been demolished had been unable to return to Kennedy Road.

== Legacy ==
The attack on Kennedy Road posed a challenge to the ability of Abahlali baseMjondolo to organise, since its leaders were forced to go underground and it was unable to hold public meetings for several months, but the group survived. The attack is seen by the Socio-Economic Rights Institute of South Africa as having been planned by local ANC members with the help of the local police. The institute launched a court case in tandem with AbM, suing the police and the municipality for their failure to intervene in the attacks. Paul Trewhela wrote:

The scandal is that this political prosecution was ever instituted in the first place, and that it was dragged on, month after month, by magistrates, prosecution and police without a shred of reliable evidence – with plentiful evidence, rather, of manipulation and intimidation of witnesses by the police and local ANC structures.
