= Zodwa Nsibande =

South African activist

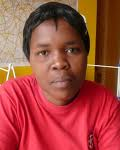
- Nsibande in 2010
- Born: 1984 (age 41–42); Enhlalakahle
- Known for: General Secretary of the Abahlali baseMjondolo youth league

Zodwa Nsibande is a South African housing activist and former General Secretary of the Abahlali baseMjondolo youth league.

== Early life ==
Zodwa Nsibande was born in 1984, in Enhlalakahle, KwaZulu Natal, then her family moved to Durban. At age 18, she started living at the Kennedy Road informal settlement. She and her mother were part of the founding members of Abahlali baseMjondolo. She studied information technology for two years at Durban Commercial College but had to stop after the stove in her shack exploded. She was hospitalised for six months.

== Career ==
Nsibande became General Secretary of the Abahlali baseMjondolo youth league in 2008 and was re-elected the following year. She was critical of the impact of the FIFA 2010 World Cup on shack dwellers in Durban. She published the article "Serving our Life Sentence in the Shacks" in 2010, having written it with AbM leader S'bu Zikode.

She has appeared in documentaries such as Dear Mandela and participated in a screening tour of US universities. She was present at the 2009 attack on Kennedy Road in which the informal settlement was attacked by a mob. After she commented on television about the KZN Slums Act she received death threats. As of 2026, Nsibande was working for the Church Land Programme.
