= South African Council of Churches =

Interdenominational forum in South Africa

The South African Council of Churches (SACC) is an interdenominational forum in South Africa. It was a prominent anti-apartheid organisation during the years of apartheid in South Africa. Its leaders have included Desmond Tutu, Beyers Naudé and Frank Chikane. It is a member of the Fellowship of Christian Councils in Southern Africa.

== Values ==
“The South African Council of Churches exists to lead common Christian action that works for moral witness in South Africa, addressing issues of justice, national reconciliation, integrity or creation, eradication of poverty, and contributing towards the empowerment of all those who are spiritually, socially and economically marginalised.”

== Leadership ==
The SACC is governed by a national conference that meets once every three years. The resolutions of the conference are implemented by a central committee that meets annually. The committee is chaired by either the president or a vice-president of the Council. An executive committee is elected by the central committee and meets at least four times a year. The officers of the Council include a president, vice-presidents, and a general secretary who acts as executive officer.

=== General Secretaries ===
[dates need verification]

- Rev. Mzwandile Molo (Methodist Church of Southern Africa), 2024 - current
- Bishop Malusi Mpumlwana (Ethiopian Episcopal Church), 2015 – 2024
- Rev Mautji Pataki (Uniting Presbyterian Church in Southern Africa), 2011– 2014
- Mr Edwin Makue (Uniting Reformed Church in Southern Africa), 2006-2011
- Dr Molefe Tsele (Evangelical Lutheran Church in Southern Africa), 2001–2006
- Rev Charity Majiza (Presbyterian Church), 1998–2000
- Ms Brigalia Bam (Anglican Church of Southern Africa), 1994–1998
- Rev Frank Chikane (Apostolic Faith Mission), 1987–1994
- Rev Dr CF Beyers Naudé (Reformed Church in Africa), 1984–1986?
- Archbishop Desmond Mpilo Tutu (Anglican Church of Southern Africa), 1978–1984
- Rev John Thorne (United Congregational Church), 1977 (3 months)
- Mr John Rees (Methodist Church of Southern Africa), 1970–1977
- Archbishop Bill Burnett (Church of the Province of South Africa), 1967–1969

=== Presidents ===
[dates need verification]

- Bishop Sithembele Sipuka (Roman Catholic Church) 2024 - current
- Archbishop Thabo Makgoba Anglican Church of Southern Africa) 2021 - 2024
- Presiding Bishop Ziphozihle Siwa (Methodist Church of Southern Africa) 2014 - 2021
- Bishop Jo Seoka (Anglican Church of Southern Africa), 2010–2014
- Prof. Tinyiko Sam Maluleke (Evangelical Presbyterian Church in South Africa), 2007-2010
- Prof. Russel Botman (Uniting Reformed Church in Southern Africa), 2003–2007
- Presiding Bishop Mvume Dandala (Methodist Church of Southern Africa), 1998–2003
- Bishop Sigqibo Dwane (Order of Ethiopia), 1995–1998
- Dr Khoza Mgojo (Methodist Church of Southern Africa), 1990–1995
- Dr Manas Buthulezi (Evangelical Lutheran Church in Southern Africa), 1983–1990
- Bishop Peter Storey (Methodist Church of Southern Africa), 1981–1983
- Rev SPE Sam Buti (Reformed Church in Africa), ca. 1979
- Rev John Thorne (United Congregational Church), ca. 1975–1976
- Rev A.W. Habelgaarn (Moravian Church), 1971–?
- Archbishop Robert Selby Taylor (Church of the Province of South Africa), 1968

== History of the SACC ==
=== 1988 bombing of Khotso House ===
The SACC headquarters at Khotso House in Johannesburg were destroyed by a bomb on August 31, 1988. The Truth and Reconciliation Commission later found that State President P. W. Botha had personally ordered the bombing. Former Minister of Law and Order Adriaan Vlok and several senior policemen applied for and were granted amnesty for the bombing. The bombing party was directed by Eugene de Kock, then commander at Vlakplaas, a secret facility of the security branch of the South African Police force.

=== Alliance with the ANC ===
During the anti-apartheid struggle, the SACC was in alliance with liberation movements such as the African National Congress (ANC). In recent times, there have been claims that the ANC has marginalised the Council in favour of Pastor Ray McCauley's National Interfaith Leadership Council which the SACC was excluded from and that there are also tensions between the two organisations. The SACC has also been extremely critical of the ANC for its role in the September 2009 militia attacks on Kennedy Road informal settlement calling for an independent investigation into police inaction and the release of community leaders associated with Abahlali baseMjondolo and the Kennedy Road Development Committee.
