= Dear Mandela =

2012 documentary about Abahlali baseMjondolo

- Directed by: Dara Kell & Christopher Nizza
- Written by: Dara Kell & Christopher Nizza
- Produced by: Dara Kell & Christopher Nizza
- Starring: Mnikelo Ndabankulu, Zama Ndlovu, Mazwi Nzimande, S'bu Zikode
- Release date: June 2012 (Brooklyn)
- Running time: 94 minutes
- Countries: South Africa; United States
- Languages: Zulu, Xhosa, English

Dear Mandela is a 2012 South-African/American documentary focusing on three friends who are members of the shackdwellers movement Abahlali baseMjondolo. They fight eviction by making a legal challenge against the KwaZulu-Natal Elimination and Prevention of Re-emergence of Slums Act of 2007 which ends up going to the final court of appeal, the Constitutional Court. The challenge is successful but swiftly results in a violent attack on the Kennedy Road informal settlement in 2009. The film-makers were themselves caught up in the attack.

With the events of the film happening long after Nelson Mandela stepped down as President of South Africa, his promise to house all citizens is still a central question.

The film was written, produced and directed by Dara Kell and Christopher Nizza. It premiered at the 2012 Brooklyn International Film Festival.

== Awards ==
- Winner - Grand Chameleon Award (Best Film) and Best Documentary, Brooklyn Film Festival.
- Winner - Best South African Documentary, Durban International Film Festival.
- Nominated - Africa Movie Academy Award for Best Documentary at the 8th Africa Movie Academy Awards.
