= Martin Legassick =

Martin Legassick (1940 – 1 March 2016) was a Scottish-born South African historian and activist. He died after a battle with cancer. He was one of the central figures in the "revisionist" school of South African historiography that, drawing on Marxism, revolutionised the study of the social formation of Apartheid by highlighting the importance of political economy, class contradictions and imperialism. He was also a key figure in the independent left in South Africa from the 1970s, and a critic, from the left, of many of the analytical and strategic positions taken by the African National Congress and the South African Communist Party, as well as their understanding of South African history. The author of numerous books, mainly on the history of colonialism and capitalism, he collected many of his key political writings in his 2007 book Towards Socialist Democracy.

== Early life ==
Legassick was born in Edinburgh, Scotland. In 1947 he and his parents emigrated to South Africa. He attended the Diocesan College in Cape Town. In 1960 he became a Rhodes Scholar at Balliol College, Oxford. He later completed his PhD at the University of California. He then worked at universities in the United Kingdom and Tanzania, where he became active in the ANC and the South African Congress of Trade Unions (SACTU) in exile. Together with Giovanni Arrighi, John S. Saul and others he developed an influential politico-economic analysis focusing on the contradictions engendered by the proletarianisation and dispossession of the Southern African peasantry. According to Arrighi, "Martin Legassick and Harold Wolpe...maintained that South African Apartheid was primarily because the regime had to become more repressive of the African labour force because it was fully proletarianized, and could no longer subsidize capital accumulation as it had done in the past."

== Student activism ==
In the 1970s, Legassick became involved in the independent left. In 1979, together with Paula Ensor, Dave Hemson and Rob Petersen, he was suspended from the African National Congress for allegedly forming a faction. They were involved in the exiled African National Congress. They regarded their suspension as undemocratic and launched the Marxist Workers Tendency of the ANC. Legassick left academia in 1981 to become a full-time anti-apartheid activist, arguing for the transformation of the African National Congress into a revolutionary working class movement, and a socialist solution to South Africa's national and social questions. He was on the editorial committee of the MWT journal, Inqaba yaBasebenzi, and the MWT newspaper, Congress Militant. He was expelled by the ANC in 1985.

== Academia ==
After the unbanning of the ANC in 1990 he was able to return home to Cape Town where he returned to academia. However, he continued to play a leading role in the MWT of the ANC and was active in working class struggles in the Western Cape. The Marxist Workers' Tendency was affiliated to the Committee for a Workers' International, an international organisation of Trotskyist parties and the newspaper, The Militant. Legassick was expelled from the ANC in 1985.

Legassick later became a prominent activist working with a variety of groups in Cape Town including the Western Cape Anti-Eviction Campaign in the 2000s, with Abahlali baseMjondolo, with the Mandela Park Backyarders and, more recently, in the Democratic Left Front. In 2007, he was involved in an exchange of open letters with the then National Minister of Housing in South Africa, Lindiwe Sisulu. In May 2009, he was arrested while supporting the Macassar Village Land Occupation near Cape Town.

A dominant and consistent theme in Legassick's political work is the building of "a mass workers' party". The Workers and Socialist Party is a South African political party from the MWT tradition, that takes Legassick's work as an important reference point.

== Publications ==
- Legassick, Martin (1969). The Griqua, the Sotho-Tswana, and the Missionaries, 1780-1840: The Politics of a Frontier Zone. Los Angeles: University of California.
- — (1973), "Class and Nationalism in South African Protest: The South African Communist Party and the 'Native Republic', 1928-34", Eastern African Studies, vol. 15, Syracuse University, Program of Eastern African Studies, Maxwell School of Citizenship and Public Affairs
- —; Hemson, David (1976). Foreign investment and the reproduction of racial capitalism in South Africa. Anti-Apartheid Movement. ISBN 9780900065019.
- — (1993). All My Powers Have Been Swallowed by Upington: The Life and Times of Alfred Gubula, President of the UDF in the Northern Cape, 1989-1991 as Told to and Edited by Martin Legassick.
- —; Rassool, Ciraj (2000). Skeletons in the Cupboard : South African Museums and the Trade in Human Remains, 1907–1917. Kimberly: McGregor Museum.
- — (2003). "Housing battles in post-Apartheid South Africa: The Case of Mandela Park, Khayelitsha". South African Labour Bulletin. Archived from the original on 24 May 2012.
- — (2004), Armed Struggle and Democracy: The Case of South Africa, Nordic Africa Institute
- — (2007). Towards Socialist Democracy. Pietermaritzburg: University of KwaZulu-Natal Press. ISBN 978-1-86914-094-6.
- — (2008a), Western Cape Housing Crisis: Writings on Joe Slovo and Delft (PDF)
- — (November 2008). "Debating the revival of the workers' movement in the 1970s: the South African democracy education trust and post-apartheid patriotic history". Kronos. 34 (1). Bellville, Western Cape.
- — (2010). The Politics of a South African Frontier: The Griqua, the Sotho-Tswana and the Missionaries, 1780-1840. Basler Afrika Bibliographien. ISBN 978-3-905758-14-6.
- — (2010). The Struggle for the Eastern Cape 1800-1854: Subjugation and the Roots of South African Democracy. KMM Review Pub. ISBN 978-0-620-36610-6.
- — (2016). Hidden Histories of Gordonia: Land Dispossession And Resistance In The Northern Cape, 1800-1990. Wits University Press. ISBN 978-1-86814-955-1.
