= UnFreedom Day =

Unofficial annual event in South Africa

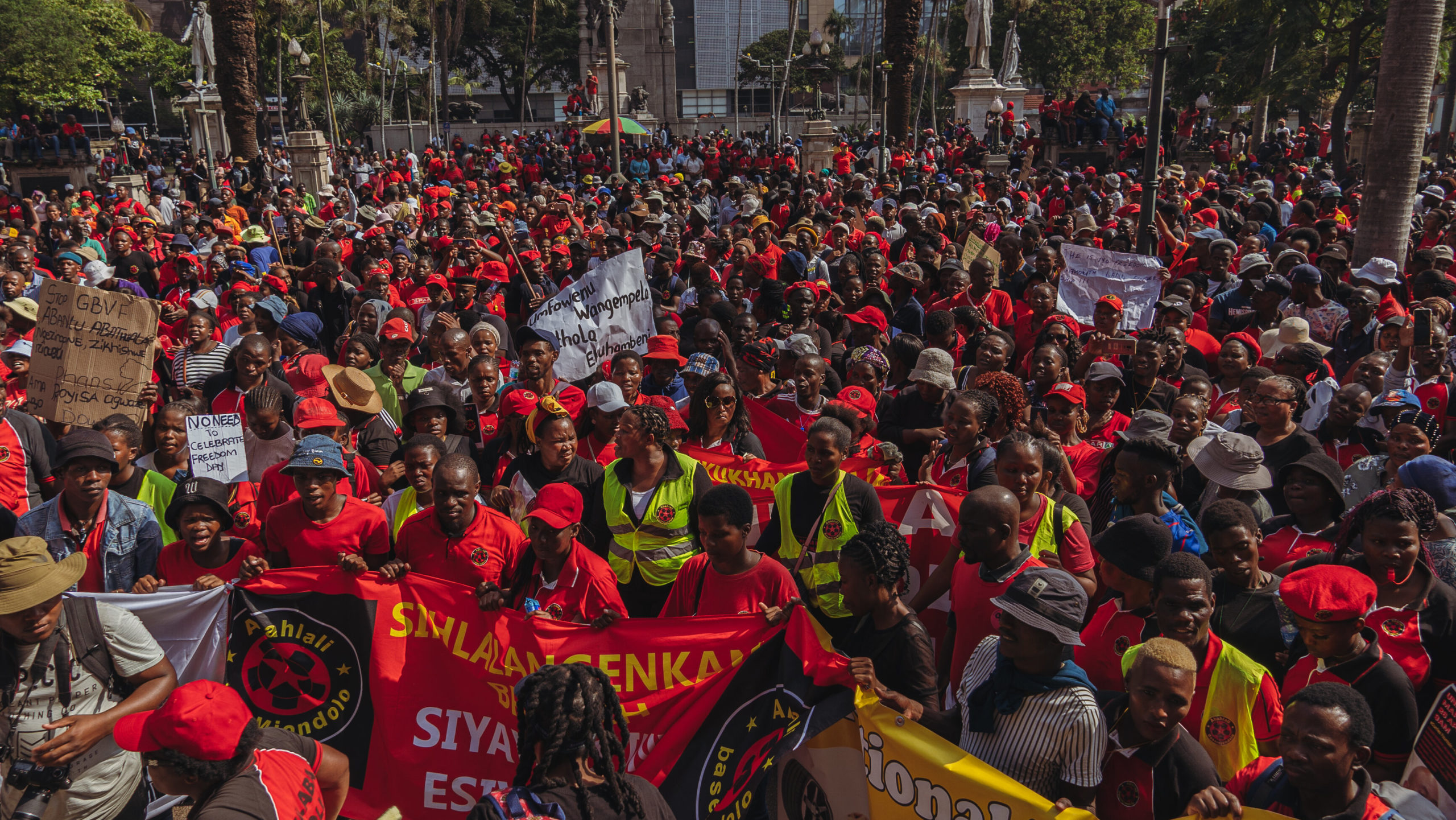

UnFreedom Day is an unofficial annual event that is marked every year on or around 27 April. UnFreedom Day is organised to counter the official South African holiday called Freedom Day, an annual celebration of South Africa's first democratic elections in 1994.

UnFreedom Day was started by Abahlali baseMjondolo in Durban in 2006. It has become a day of education in which films, discussions, speeches and performances play a major role along with marches and rallies, attracting thousands of participants. The point of the day is to contest the claim that the poor are free in South Africa have attracted crowds of thousands.

The day is now marked in different parts of the country and by various organisations. In 2023 Abahlali held UnFreedom events in the KwaZulu-Natal, Mpumalanga and Gauteng provinces.

== Attempt to ban UnFreedom Day ==
In 2009 the South African police initially tried to ban the UnFreedom Day event held by Abahlali baseMjondolo, together with the Anti-Eviction Campaign, the Landless People's Movement, the Rural Network and the eMacambini Anti-Removal Committee (all of these movements supported the No Land! No House! No Vote! campaign) in the Kennedy Road settlement in Durban. However the police ban was seen off, those who had been arrested were released and the event went ahead with a police helicopter circling low above the assembly. A number of popular musical groups performed at the event including the Dlamini King Brothers.
