= Occupy South Africa =

Mass action against issues in South Africa

Occupy South Africa was a South African initiative primarily aimed at protesting and inciting mass action against the racial, economic and social inequality in South Africa. It is part of the globally Occupy Wall Street movement. It consists of a loose informal affiliation of on the ground groups and individuals across South Africa as well as internet based groups. Groups such as Taking Back South Africa!, Occupy South Africa are involved in South Africa and online. The movement is also involved with the Marikana miners' strike.

== Broad objectives ==
Like the occupy movement elsewhere the South African movement is a heterogeneous campaign. Some aspects of it deal with the governments failure to render equitable distribution of wealth, while other aspects of it deal with White minority dominance and other forms of ongoing out crops of apartheid such as economic apartheid. Others focus on White media domination and inequity in representation.

== Anonymous' message ==
The logo of the initiative.

On 18 March 2011 a video purportedly by the hacktivist group 'Anonymous' was released by Winds of Change Media calling on the South African people to rise up against the government and the capitalist system. This video expressed support for the 'Taking Back South Africa!' campaign. James Lorimer, spokesperson for the Democratic Alliance, the second biggest political party in South Africa, said in response to the call that because nobody knew who was behind the call, the uprising call lacked credibility.

== Occupy South Africa by region ==
After months of networking with individuals and social groups in South Africa a call was made by Taking Back South Africa! to hold countrywide occupations in various cities in South Africa on 15 October 2011 following the same successful tactic used by Occupy Wall Street. The call went viral over the week preceding 15 October and many social groups and individual activists started preparing for the occupation of symbolic locations in their cities. Saturday, 15 October witnessed South Africa's first coordinated occupation which took place in five cities simultaneously, namely Johannesburg, Cape Town, Durban, Grahamstown and East London. Joe Hani, one of the admins of 'Taking Back South Africa!' said when questioned by the Mail&Guardian newspaper as to the motivation behind Occupy South Africa that "no country was more worthy of an uprising against capitalism than South Africa". Ayanda Kota, the chairperson of the Unemployed People's Movement said: ""We, the poor, suffer whenever companies fix the price of bread or when there are more job losses while chief executives get rich. But our protest is also localised, in the sense that we are protesting about the R19-million that is unaccounted for by the Makana municipality, the R240 000 spent by local government on bogus soccer development clinics and the privatisation of our struggle by the ANC." Richard Pithouse, a Rhodes University political scientist, said the Grahamstown occupation protest could stand out as an example to other cities. It had been preceded by months of careful political work involving the Unemployed Peoples' Movement and the Students for Social Justice. This had culminated in "a negotiated solidarity based on equality" between disillusioned middle-class youth and grassroots communities, which had "explosive political potential".

=== Occupy Johannesburg ===
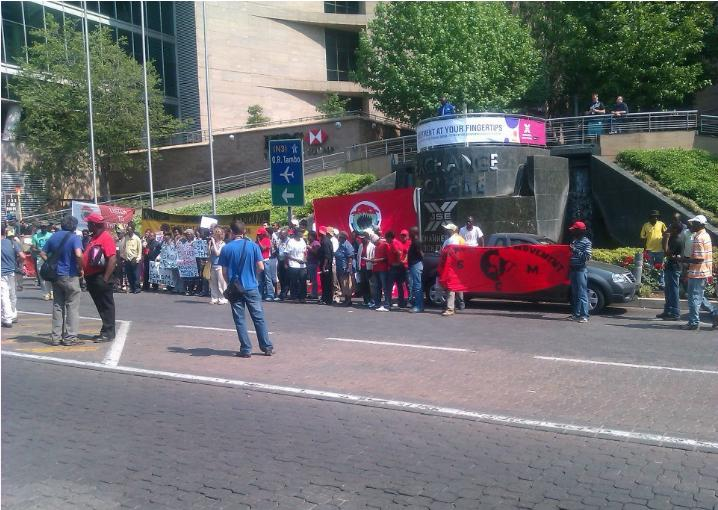
Demonstrators at Occupy Johannesburg.

Around two hundred occupiers gathered outside the Johannesburg Stock Exchange and gave speeches over a microphone claiming to be of the 99% and they were very angry with the corporates and the politicians. Police later told the protesters they had to disperse or face arrest. There were problems related to the retreat point also at which point the occupiers decided to disperse and return another day. In attendance were activists from Soweto and Thembelihle, the Democratic Left Front had a prominent presence and members of Zeitgeist and September National Imbizo/Blackwash were in attendance as well.

Andrew Bennie of the Democratic Left Front movement (DLF)noted in an interview with ABN news that South Africa's class divide was worse than many countries also Occupying.

The South African Civil Society Information Service (SACSIS) also attended.

=== Occupy Cape Town ===
Around 200 attended with people coming and going throughout the day. A hot speaker was set up and speeches were given from occupiers from various backgrounds and ideologies. Police mingled past but did not intervene. City police stopped people bringing a trailer in and tried to tell a crafter not to sell his wire beaded flowers but the occupiers insisted he be allowed to stay. At the occupation were members of community organisations from Blikkiesdorp and Manenberg, Zeitgesters, Anarchists, and Blackwash members amongst others.

Following occupations in Cape Town were held in Thibault Square.

Mario Wanza, of 'Proudly Manenberg' and one of the organizers of Occupy Cape Town stated that "People have started realising that political parties don't have the answers. They make speeches everyday but nothing happens. Our lives don't get any better, our lives get worse. What is important is that this is a growing movement of change and we have given up on the government solving our problems. We have given up on the rich solving our problems. We are the only ones that can change things in this country."

=== Occupy Durban ===
Activist Sarah Dawson reported that Durban had a steady flow of occupiers through the day, and had some really interesting discussions, and the occupiers had the opportunity to inform passers by about the movement. There were some natural arguments about what the movement is directed towards, but a general consensus that diversity should accommodated, and that the movement is about acknowledging a problem. Things were peaceful and spirits were high for the most part. Between 50 and 100 people occupied. Discussions were had about the possibility of making it a weekly occurrence into the future and seeking greater cooperation with other civil society groups and grassroot movements. There were children, guitarists and a slam poet.

Sarah Dawson argued on behalf of the largely middle class attendance that "The movement is clearly not about "The Poor" with a capital P, but about a systemic problem. The 99% consists of people at every end of the spectrum, who have diverse experiences and responsibilities, but who acknowledge that their experiences share a cause."

During the Cop 17 climate talks of December 2011, the occupation seemed to become more serious in Durban.

=== Occupy Grahamstown ===
Mbali Baduza from Students for Social Justice reported that an initial group of 20 Rhodes University students gathered at the Botanical Gardens at 10 am. After having distributed T-shirts they made their way down to High Street to meet the masses (Unemployed People's Movement comrades and many others). As they walked down they chanted "Enough is Enough. We want our country back". While they walked down High Street, they distributed pamphlets which contained information about why the demonstration was happening and why it was necessary.

When they reached the crowd gathered at the cathedral (about 30–40 people) they all merged and sang protest songs for about an hour. Together they marched up and down high street and the louder they sang, the more people from the street joined. People of all races.

On their return to the cathedral, the floor was opened up to the crowd to share their grievances. People from Phaphamani, Vukani and other locations spoke mainly about their need for 3 essentials: electricity, water and housing.

They then made their way to the Makana Municipal buildings and chanted "Amandla, ngawethu! Amanga ngawabo!" Richard Pithouse and Ayanda Kota addressed the crowd and spoke about how although the government officials were not present, they would hear of the day's events. It was more of a symbolic gesture. Ayanda Kota and some UPM comrades went into the municipal buildings and threw fecal matter inside to protest the bucket system, all of which was broadcast on South African news.

After that activity, the police came and asked the crowd to leave.

Ben Fogel stated that Occupy Grahamstown offers hope to the South Africa left, as it shows that radical students and the poor can form a political alliance based upon equality and solidarity.

=== Occupy East London ===
Chloe Menteath stated that five people later to be six stood underneath the East London Steve Biko Statue and in front of the Imperialists Old Shack. The small group shouted slogans out for an hour and a half while curious passers by looked on.

== See also ==
- Occupy movement
- We are the 99%
