= Louisa Motha =

- Born: Motala Heights, Durban, South Africa
- Citizenship: South African
- Occupation: Activist
- Organization: Abahlali baseMjondolo
- Known for: Anti-eviction activism; Abahlali baseMjondolo movement

Louisa Motha is a South African activist. She was co-ordinator of the Abahlali baseMjondolo movement for a number of years beginning in 2004. She lives in the Motala Heights shack settlement in Pinetown near the city of Durban in South Africa.

Motha became friends with fellow activist Shamita Naidoo when they met washing their clothes in the river.

She is particularly well known for organising against evictions and was a strong critic of the Slums Act. She also started a women's gardening group called the Motola Diggers.

== Activism ==
She has participated in campaigns against forced evictions and has advocated for improved housing conditions for residents of informal settlements.

She has also spoken out against housing policies affecting informal settlements, including the KwaZulu-Natal Slums Act.
