= Rubin Phillip =

South African Anglican bishop (born c. 1948)

The Right Reverend Rubin Phillip
- Bishop of Natal
- Province: Southern Africa
- Diocese: Natal
- Installed: 2000
- Term ended: 2015
- Predecessor: Michael Nuttall
- Successor: Dino Gabriel

Rubin Phillip is a South African Anglican cleric and activist. He was the first person of Indian heritage in South Africa to hold the position of Bishop of Natal, in the Anglican Diocese of Natal (2000–2015).

== Early life and education ==
The great-grandchild of indentured labourers from Andhra Pradesh, Rubin Phillip grew up in Clairwood, a suburb of Durban with a large concentration of people of Indian descent, in a non-religious household, but converted to Christianity.

== Career and activism ==
=== Black Consciousness Movement ===
Phillip was involved in the Black Consciousness Movement, was a close friend to Steve Biko and was the Deputy President of the South African Students' Organisation in 1972 when Steve Biko was President.

He was a noted anti-apartheid activist and spent three years under house arrest in the 1970s and was banned in 1973. He was banned - legally excluded from public life - in 1973.

=== Bishop ===
He was enthroned as Bishop of Natal in February 2000. He is the first person of Indian South African to hold this position. His term ended in 2015.

=== Zimbabwe ===
In 2008, Phillip, working with the dockworkers' union, successfully obtained a court order preventing arms shipments destined for Zimbabwe from being transported through South Africa. He is chair of the Zimbabwe Solidarity Forum in South Africa.

=== Abahlali baseMjondolo ===
Phillip has been, and remains, a strong supporter of the shack dwellers' movement Abahlali baseMjondolo. He has attended meetings, memorials, mass ecumenical prayers, marches and UnFreedom Day rallied hosted by Abahlali baseMjondolo and supported the organisation's successful battle to have the KZN Slums Act declared unconstitutional. In September 2009, he condemned the violent expulsion of Abahlali baseMjondolo from the Kennedy Road informal settlement blaming political interference and stating that "this militia has acted with the support of the local ANC structures". He supported the movement through the case that followed the attack.

He was critical of the 2010 Football World Cup saying that: "If we can successfully host a massive event like the World Cup, spending billions, then why can't we provide water, electricity and housing for a handful of shack dwellers?"

In 2013 he expressed solidarity with Abahlali baseMjondolo after the movement was subject to assassinations, a police killing, shootings and arrests.

=== Other activism ===
Phillip was very critical of the police massacre of striking mine workers at Marikana in 2012. At the time he declared that "And so again, the truth of our country is in dead black bodies littering the ground. The truth of our time is that people asserting their rights and dignity have been brought down in a hail of bullets."

He continues to take political positions and remains connected to grassroots struggles.

He has also taken a strong stand against gender-based violence.

== Awards and recognition ==
In 2009 Phillip was given the Bremen Peace Award on the grounds of his work in the struggle against apartheid and his ongoing work "to offer solidarity to the displaced people, victims of persecutions and detainees".

In August 2010 Phillip was given the Diakonia Award by the Diakonia Council of Churches, in recognition of "his involvement with the anti apartheid movement as far back as the 1960s, through his advocacy and involvement in the Zimbabwe crisis to his solidarity with the shack dwellers movement, Abahlali baseMjondolo." He dedicated the award to "shack dwellers, especially those from Kennedy Road and all those who have stood in solidarity with them."

Anglican Church of Southern Africa titles
Preceded by Michael Nuttall	Bishop of Natal; 1999–2015	Succeeded by Dino Gabriel
