= Third Force (South Africa) =

Term used by leaders of the ANC

The "Third Force" was a term used by leaders of the ANC during the late 1980s and early 1990s to refer to a clandestine force believed to be responsible for a surge in violence in KwaZulu-Natal, and townships around and south of the Witwatersrand (or "Rand").

The Truth and Reconciliation Commission (TRC) found that:

while little evidence exists of a centrally directed, coherent or formally constituted "Third Force", a network of security and ex-security force operatives, frequently acting in conjunction with right-wing elements and/or sectors of the IFP, was involved in actions that could be construed as fomenting violence and which resulted in gross human rights violations, including random and target killings.

== Uses after 1994 ==
Today, the high rate of protest in South Africa is often attributed to a "third force", often assumed to be linked to foreign intelligence agencies, opposition political parties and white intellectuals.

However, S'bu Zikode of the shackdweller's movement Abahlali baseMjondolo has deconstructed the term by claiming the third force is the anger of the poor. Abahlali baseMjondolo has also argued that "it is clear that the third force is just another name for the organised poor".

The ANC also often refers to protestors and other critics as "counter-revolutionaries". Cosatu President Sdumo Dlamini has claimed that popular organisations active in local politics are linked to the CIA.

The Mail & Guardian has reported that: "According to grassroots activists the accusations of 'criminality' and 'third forces' are familiar: used to delegitimise and dismiss dissent and grievances - and perpetuate the notion of a society homogenously content with an ANC-led government." The newspaper also quoted activist Ayanda Kota as saying that these allegations "take the agency away from us. It's the same argument used for the mineworkers fighting for a living wage: they are being used by some 'third force' . . .Poor people…apparently can't organize. It was the same with Steve Biko and the Black Consciousness Movement - the CIA were behind them."

The xenophobic pogroms in May 2008 were also ascribed to 'the third force'. In 2015 Malusi Gigaba also ascribed xenophobic violence to a "third force". Protest at mining on communal lands, independent trade union action, student protest and the formation of new political parties has also been seen in conspiratorial terms by the ANC. Gwede Mantashe, secretary general of the ANC, has ascribed strikes on the mines to the agency of 'white foreigners'. The ANC controlled eThekwini Municipality in Durban has repeatedly claimed that 'the third force' is behind land occupations in the city. Charles van Onselen argues that the ANC uses the idea of 'the third force' as a conspiracy theory to deflect attention from its own failings.

== See also ==
- Civil Cooperation Bureau - an apartheid era military hit squad
- Inkatha - Zulu cultural and political organisation
- Outside agitator
