= Abahlali baseMjondolo =

Shack dwellers' movement in South Africa

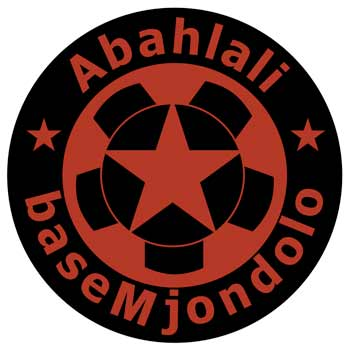
- Abahlali baseMjondolo Logo
- Nickname: iButho labampofu (The army of the poor) & Ulwandle olubomvu (The red sea)
- Pronunciation: Zulu pronunciation: [aɓaˈɬali ɓasɛm̩dʒɔˈndɔːlo]
- Formation: 2005
- Founded at: Kennedy Road, Clare Estate, Durban
- Purpose: Poor people's movement
- Location: KwaZulu-Natal, Gauteng, Mpumalanga, Eastern Cape
- Affiliations: Progressive International
- Website: abahlali.org

Abahlali baseMjondolo (AbM, Zulu pronunciation: [aɓaˈɬali ɓasɛm̩dʒɔˈndɔːlo], in English: "the residents of the shacks") is a socialist shack dwellers' movement in South Africa which primarily campaigns for land, housing and dignity, to democratise society from below and against xenophobia.

The movement grew out of a road blockade organised from the Kennedy Road shack settlement in the city of Durban in early 2005 and has since expanded to other parts of South Africa. As of October 2022 it claims to have more than 115,000 members in good standing in 81 branches in four of the nine provinces of South Africa - KwaZulu-Natal, Mpumalanga, the Eastern Cape and Gauteng.

It has links with similar social movements elsewhere in the world, such as the Landless Workers' Movement in Brazil. It has faced sustained, and at times violent, repression. More than twenty of its leaders have been assassinated, something it blames on the ruling African National Congress.

The assassinations of Abahlali baseMjondolo members and leaders has been noted by international organisations such as Amnesty International and was discussed at the United Nations Human Rights Council in 2022.

Academic work on Abahlali baseMjondolo stresses that it is non-professionalised (i.e. its leaders are non-salaried), independent of NGO control, autonomous from political organisations and party politics and democratic. Writing in 2009, SJ Cooper-Knock described the movement as "neurotically democratic, impressively diverse and steadfastly self-critical". Ercument Celik writes that "I experienced how democratically the movement ran its meetings."

A 2006 article in The Times stated that the movement "has shaken the political landscape of South Africa." Academic Peter Vale writes that Abahlali baseMjondolo is "along with the Treatment Action Campaign the most effective grouping in South African civil society." Khadija Patel has written that the movement "is at the forefront of a new wave of mass political mobilisation".

== History ==
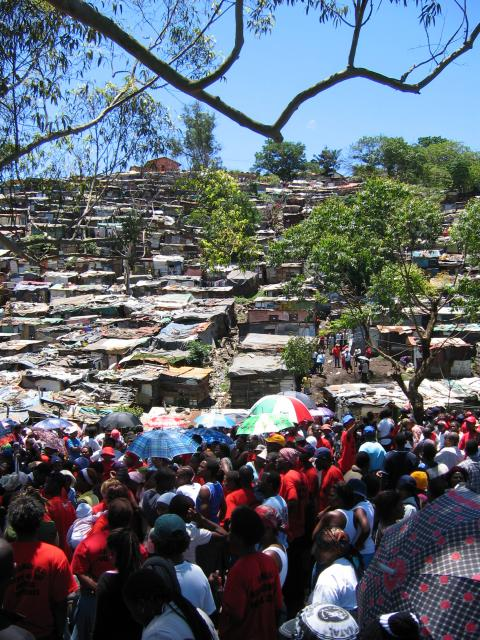
Abahlali Assembly, Foreman Road Settlement

In 2001, the eThekwini Metropolitan Municipality, which governs the city of Durban and surrounding places including Pinetown, embarked on a slum clearance program. Shack settlements were demolished and there was a refusal to provide basic services (for example electricity and sanitation) to existing settlements on the grounds that all shack settlements were now temporary. Following these demolitions, some shack dwellers were simply left homeless and others were subjected to forced removals to the rural areas outside the city.

Abahlali baseMjondolo (AbM) formed out of a series of land and housing protests in 2005. Firstly, 750 people from the Kennedy Road shack settlement in Durban blockaded the N2 freeway for four hours with a burning barricade. There were 14 arrests. The group's original work from 2005 onwards was primarily committed to opposing demolitions and forced removals and to struggling for good land and quality housing in the cities. In most instances, this involved a demand for shack settlements to be upgraded or for new houses to be built close to where the existing settlements were. AbM argued that basic services such as water, electricity and toilets should be immediately provided to shack settlements while land and housing are negotiated and also engaged in mass actions providing access to water and electricity. AbM quickly had a considerable degree of success in stopping evictions and forced removals, winning the right for new shacks to be built and gaining access to basic services.

The United Nations expressed serious concerns in early 2008 about the treatment of shack dwellers in Durban. In late 2008, the AbM President S'bu Zikode announced a deal with the eThekwini Municipality which would see services being provided to 14 settlements and tenure security and formal housing to three. The municipality confirmed this deal in February 2009. AbM has been involved in considerable conflict with the eThekwini Municipality and has undertaken numerous protests and legal actions. Its members have been beaten and its leaders arrested by the South African Police Service in Sydenham, Durban. AbM has often made claims of severe police harassment, including torture. On a number of occasions, these claims have been supported by church leaders and human rights organisations. AbM has successfully sued the police for unlawful assaults on its members. In October 2009, it won a court case on appeal which declared the KZN Slums Act unconstitutional. There was acute conflict between AbM and the Cape Town City Council in 2009. This centred on the Macassar Village Land Occupation. There was similar conflict in 2013 around the Marikana Land Occupation. There was also concern about the possibility of evictions linked to the 2010 FIFA World Cup.

Abahlali baseMjondolo is the largest shack dweller's organisation in South Africa and campaigns to improve the living conditions of poor people and to democratise society from below.

== Campaigns ==
Since 2005, the movement has carried out a series of large scale marches, engaged in direct action for various kinds, including such land occupations, arranging self organised water and electricity connections and making tactical use of the courts. The movement has often made anti-capitalist statements, has called for "a living communism", and has demanded the expropriation of private land for public housing.

Campaigning for well-situated urban land for public housing and has occupied unused government land. is central to its work, along with opposition to evictions. The movement has often used the phrase 'The Right to the City' to insist that the location of housing is critically important and it demands that shack settlements are upgraded where they are and that people are not relocated to out of town developments.

It has also organised numerous land occupations.

The movement also campaigns for the provision of basic services to shack settlements and for equal access to school education for children from poor families. Shack fires are a major problem in South Africa - between 2003 and 2008, there was an average of ten shack fires every day and someone perishing every second day - and the movement also campaigns against the living conditions that keep people at risk of fires.

It has organised a number of mutual aid projects: crèches, kitchens and vegetable gardens and runs political education projects through its 'University of Abahlali baseMjondolo, including regular seminars. It runs the Frantz Fanon School, a political school, in the eKhenana Commune.

The movement also campaigns against xenophobia. It took a strong stand against the xenophobic attacks that swept the country in May 2008 taking more than 60 lives. AbM released a statement in Afrikaans, English, isiZulu and Portuguese, declaring, "a person cannot be illegal [...] don't turn your suffering neighbours into enemies." Sociologist Michael Neocosmos saw this as the "most important statement on the xenophobic violence" and praised the fact that it was a shack-dweller group addressing the issue. There were no attacks in any Abahlali settlements and the movement was also able to stop an in-progress attack in the (non-Abahlali affiliated) Kenville settlement and to offer shelter to some people displaced in the attacks.

The movement has also organised numerous actions against police racism and brutality.

The movement has never run candidates for elections and, in its early years, it together with other grassroots movements in Johannesburg and Cape Town, called for election boycotts. It boycotted the local government elections in 2006, the national government elections in 2009 and the 2011 local government elections under the banner of No Land! No House! No Vote!. After its leaders began to be assassinated in 2013 it twice called for tactical protest votes against the ANC.

== Philosophy ==
Abahlali baseMjondolo describes itself as "a homemade politics that everyone can understand and find a home in" and stresses that it moves from the lived experience of the poor to create a politics that is both intellectual and actional. A slogan of the movement is 'Don't Talk About Us, Talk To Us'. Its key demand is that the social value of urban land should take priority over its commercial value and it campaigns for the public expropriation of large privately owned landholdings. The key organising strategy is to try "to recreate Commons" from below by trying to create a series of linked communes.

Its philosophy has been sketched out in a number of articles and interviews. The key ideas are those of a politics of the poor, a living politics and a people's politics. A politics of the poor is understood to mean a politics that is conducted by the poor and for the poor in a manner that enables the poor to be active participants in the struggles conducted in their name. Practically, it means that such a politics must be conducted where poor people live or in places that they can easily access, at the times when they are free, in the languages that they speak. It does not mean that middle-class people and organisations are excluded but that they are expected to come to these spaces and to undertake their politics there in a dialogical and democratic manner. There are two key aspects to the idea of a living politics. The first is that it is understood as a politics that begins not from external theory but from the experience of the people that shape it. It is argued that political education usually operates to create new elites who mediate relationships of patronage upwards and who impose ideas on others and to exclude ordinary people from thinking politically. This politics is not anti-theory – it just asserts the need to begin from lived experience and to move on from there rather than to begin from theory (usually imported from the Global North) and to impose theory on the lived experience of suffering and resistance in the shacks. The second key aspect, of a living politics, is that political thinking is always undertaken democratically and in common. People's politics is opposed to party politics or politicians' politics (as well as to top down undemocratic forms of NGO politics) and it is argued that the former is a popular democratic project undertaken without financial reward and with an explicit refusal of representative roles and personal power while the latter is a top down, professionalised representative project driven by personal power.

While the movement is clear that its key immediate goals are 'land and housing' it is equally clear that it sees its politics as going beyond this. S'bu Zikode has commented that: "We have seen in certain cases in South Africa where governments have handed out houses simply to silence the poor. This is not acceptable to us. Abahalali's struggle is beyond housing. We fight for respect and dignity. If houses are given to silence the poor then those houses are not acceptable to us."

'Abahlalism' has on occasion been described as anarchist or autonomist in practice. This is primarily because its praxis correlates closely with central tenets of anarchism, including decentralisation, opposition to imposed hierarchy, direct democracy and recognition of the connection between means and ends. However, the movement has never described itself as either anarchist or autonomist. Zikode has said that the movement aspires to "an ethics of living communism. and the movement frequently described itself as committing to building 'socialism from below', and sometimes describes itself as communist. It begins its large public gatherings with the Internationale. Following the late Lindokuhle Mnguni it makes frequent use of the slogan 'Socialism or death'.

== Repression ==
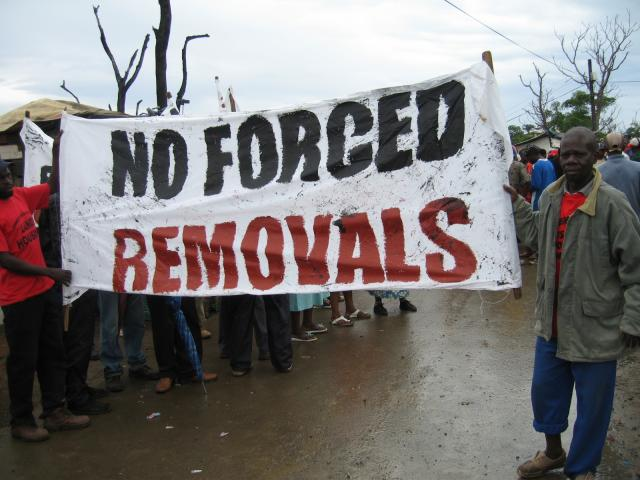
AbM protest in Durban

The movement has suffered severe repression. In its early years individuals in the ruling party often accused it of being criminals manipulated by a malevolent white man, a third force, or a foreign intelligence agency. The movement, like others in South Africa, suffered sustained illegal harassment from the state. There were more Than 200 arrests of Abahlali members in the first last three years of the movement's existence and repeated police brutality in people's homes, in the streets and in detention. On a number of occasions, the police used armoured vehicles and helicopters in their attacks on unarmed shack dwellers. In 2006 the local city manager Mike Sutcliffe unlawfully implemented a complete ban on Abahlali's right to march which was eventually overturned in court. Abahlali were violently prevented from accepting invitations to appear on television and radio debates by the local police. The Freedom of Expression Institute has issued a number of statements in strong support of Abahlali's right to speak out and to organise protests. The Centre on Housing Rights and Evictions and a group of prominent church leaders have also issued public statements against police violence, as has Bishop Rubin Philip in his individual capacity, and in support of the right of the movement to publicly express dissent. In March 2008, The Mercury newspaper reported that both Human Rights Watch and Amnesty International were investigating human rights abuses against shack dwellers by the city government.

Repression began to take a new form in 2009 when a youth meeting was attacked in the Kennedy Road settlement on 26 September 2009. A mob of 40 people entered the settlement wielding guns and knives and attacked an Abahlali baseMjondolo youth meeting. Two people were killed in the resulting conflict. following which twelve members of a dance group affiliated to the movement were arrested and charged with murder. The Mail & Guardian newspaper described the arrests as Kennedy Road as a "hatchet job". On 18 July 2011, the case against the twelve accused was eventually thrown out of court. The Socio-Economic Rights Institute of South Africa issued a statement saying that the "charges were based on evidence which now appears almost certainly to have been manufactured" and that the Magistrate had described the state witnesses as ""belligerent", "unreliable" and "dishonest". Amnesty International noted that the court had found that "police had directed some witnesses to point out members of Abahlali-linked organisations at the identification parade".

IRIN, the newsletter of the UN Office for the Coordination of Humanitarian Affairs, reported in April 2010 that "The rise of an organised poor people's movement [Abahlali baseMjondolo] in South Africa's most populous province, KwaZulu-Natal, is being met with increasing hostility by the ruling African National Congress (ANC) government" and in April 2013 the movement successfully sued the Minister of Police for violence against three of its members.

On 26 June 2013, Nkululeko Gwala, an AbM leader in Cato Crest, was the first member of the movement to be assassinated. Hours before the murder, a senior ANC politician had said he was a trouble-maker. In the same year Nqobile Nzuza was shot dead by police at the Durban Marikana land occupation in September 2013, at the age of 17. The following year Thuli Ndlovu, the chairperson of the movement's branch in KwaNdengezi, was assassinated in her home on 29 September 2014. AbM accused the councillor of having a hand in the assassination. On 27 February 2015, the local councillor, Mduduzi Ngcobo, was arrested on suspicion of being behind the murder. Ngcobo and Velile Lutsheko (another ANC councillor) were sentenced to life imprisonment for the murder. Mlungisi Ndlovu, the gunman they had hired, was handed a sentence of 12 years in jail. Following these three killings numerous murders of AbM members were reported.

After a call was made for eThekwini Mayor Zandile Gumede to step down to face charges of racketeering and fraud, the Durban offices of AbM were burgled in May 2019. No money was taken but two computer hard drives were stolen. When Zikode said he was concerned by the timing of the burglary, the mayor's representative replied: "This is an old, repeated, fabricated allegation by Abahlali ... they must approach relevant security agencies if they have evidence instead of the media".

In 2022 three leaders of the movement in the eKhenana Commune - Ayanda Ngila, Nokuthula Mabaso and Lindokuhle Mnguni - were assassinated, and as of that year the movement claimed that 24 of its members had been killed. According to Nomzamo Zondi, director of a pro-bono law firm, "From the 24 Abahlali activists who have been killed; 14 of them were assassinated by izinkabi (hired assassins), six of them were killed by security forces and one child who was two weeks old was killed while sleeping from teargas fumes during a violent eviction in Foreman Road." On July 24, 2022, Khaya Ngubane, a member of the local ANY Youth League was convicted for the assassination of Lindokuhle Mnguni and sentenced to fifteen years in prison.

The assassination of Abahlali baseMjondolo activists was discussed at the 51st sessions of the United Nations Human Rights Council in 2022.

== Church support ==
Abahlali baseMjondolo has received strong support from some key church leaders such as Bishop of Natal, Rubin Phillip. In a speech at the AbM UnFreedom Day event on 27 April 2008 Phillip said:

The courage, dignity and gentle determination of Abahlali baseMjodolo has been a light that has shone ever more brightly over the last three years. You have faced fires, sickness, evictions, arrest, beatings, slander, and still you stand bravely for what is true. Your principle that everyone matters, that every life is precious, is very simple but it is also utterly profound. Many of us who hold dear the most noble traditions of our country take hope from your courage and your dignity.

The Italian theologian Brother Filippo Mondini has attempted to develop a theology based on the political thought and practices developed in Abahlali baseMjondolo.

== Poor People's Alliance ==
In September 2008, Abahlali baseMjondolo, the Western Cape Anti-Eviction Campaign, the Landless People's Movement and the Rural Network (Abahlali baseplasini) formed the Poor People's Alliance. The Anti-Eviction Campaign's chairperson said "We are calling it the Poor People's Alliance so our people can identify with it". The coalition has repeatedly clashed with the ANC. The Poor People's Alliance refuses electoral politics under the slogan "No Land! No House! No Vote!". Abahlali baseMjondolo has also organised in solidarity with the Unemployed Peoples' Movement. Following the collapse of each of the other three organisations that made up the Poor People's Alliance the alliance itself become defunct.

== International solidarity ==
Worldwide, Abahlali baseMjondolo has solidarity links with many other groups, such as Sendika in Istanbul and the Combined Harare Residents' Association in Harare. In the US, it is connected to Domestic Workers United, The Poverty Initiative, Picture the Homeless and the Movement for Justice in el Barrio in New York. It is also supported by the Movement Alliance Project in Philadelphia and Take Back the Land in Miami.

There is an AbM Solidarity Group in England and the movement has links with the London Coalition Against Poverty and War on Want. In Italy, AbM is connected to Clandestino and the Comboni Missionaries.

== Dear Mandela ==
The award-winning documentary feature film Dear Mandela tells the story of three young activists in Abahlali baseMjondolo.

== Criticism ==
In the early years of the movement's life, the then eThekwini city manager Michael Sutcliffe, claimed that the essence of the tensions between Abahlali baseMjondolo and the city lay in the movement's "rejection of the authority of the city." When the Durban High Court ruled that his attempts to ban marches by AbM were unlawful he stated that: "We will be asking serious questions of the court because we cannot allow anarchy having anyone marching at any time and any place." According to Lennox Mabaso, the then spokesperson for the Provincial Department of Housing, the movement was "under the sway of an agent provocateur" who is "engaged in clandestine operations" and who has been "assigned to provoke unrest". City Officials continue to argue that the movement was a Third Force seeking to undermine the ruling African National Congress for nefarious purposes.

In December 2006, AbM and the Western Cape Anti-Eviction Campaign, disrupted a meeting of the Social Movements Indaba (SMI) at the University of KwaZulu Natal. A member of the SMI collective said to the Mail & Guardian "they insulted us, using abusive language and all that macho lingo" whilst S'bu Zikode asserted denied any verbal violence. Since then, AbM has refused to work with SMI. AbM has also criticised the Centre for Civil Society at the University of KwaZulu-Natal and from 2006 onwards has refused to work with it.

AbM of the Western Cape called for a month of direct action in October 2010. Mzonke Poni, the chairperson of the Cape Town structure at the time, publicly endorsed road blockades as a legitimate tactic during this strike. The Treatment Action Campaign (TAC) and the South African Communist Party, the latter a major ally of the ruling ANC, issued strong statements condemning the campaign and labelling it 'violent' and, 'anarchist' and reactionary'. AbM responded by saying that their support for road blockades was not violent and that "We have never called for violence. Violence is harm to human beings. Blockading a road is not violence." They also said that the SACP's attack was really due to the movement's insistence on organising autonomously from the African National Congress. After the strike by AbM Western Cape, there were some protests in TR section of Khayelitsha in which vehicles were damaged. AbM WC ascribed these protests to the ANC Youth League as did Helen Zille and the Youth League itself. According to Leadership Magazine "The ANC Youth League in the province has hijacked the peaceful service-delivery protests organised by the social movement Abahlali baseMjondolo in Khayelitsha in a violent, destructive and desperate attempt to mobilise support for the ANC against the province's Democratic Alliance provincial and municipal governments."

== List of notable current and former Abahlali baseMjondolo activists ==
Name	Location	Information	Reference
Nkululeko Gwala	Durban	Cato Crest, assassinated in 2013	
Nokuthula Mabaso	Durban	eKhenena, assassinated in 2022	
Louisa Motha	Durban	Former co-ordinator in Motala Heights	
Lindokuhle Mnguni	Durban	eKhenena, assassinated in 2022	
Mnikelo Ndabankulu	Durban	National spokesperson (until 2014)	
Ayanda Ngila	Durban	eKhenena, assassinated in 2022	
Zodwa Nsibande	Durban	General Secretary of youth league in 2009	
Nqobile Nzuza	Marikana Land Occupation, Durban	Murdered by the police in 2013 at anti-eviction protest	
Raj Patel	United States, South Africa, Zimbabwe	Website manager	
Mzonke Poni	Western Cape	Former chairperson (2010) of the now defunct Cape Town branch	
S'bu Zikode	Durban	Current President of AbM	

== See also ==
- Fanmi Lavalas in Haiti
- The Homeless Workers' Movement in Brazil
- The Landless Workers' Movement in Brazil
- The Landless People's Movement in South Africa
- Movement for Justice in el Barrio in the United States of America
- Take Back the Land in the United States of America
- The Western Cape Anti-Eviction Campaign in South Africa
