= Mazibuko Jara =

South African activist

Mazibuko Jara (born 1973), born in Mdantsane in the Eastern Cape, one of the province of South Africa. An activist in the democratic Marxist tradition, he was active in the South African Students Congress (SASCO) and the left-wing Young Christian Students. He was a member of the South African Communist Party (SACP) until 2005, serving as its spokesperson, including editing the party paper Umsebenzi, and strategist. He was ousted from the party after he wrote a paper in 2005 rejecting the SACP's overt support for Jacob Zuma, entitled What Colour Is Our Flag? Red or JZ? : A Critique of the SACP Approach on the JZ (Jacob Zuma) Matter, one of a number of critical figures purged in the 2000s.

In 2006, Jara co-founded Amandla (magazine) where he has been arguing for a "democratic left" and Eco-Socialism, criticizing authoritarian and socially conservative tendencies in South African society at large, including in major political parties. He has campaigned for rural democracy against tribal chiefly rule. Jara is a popular educator, researcher and trainer focusing on political economy, cooperatives, food sovereignty, land reform and participatory democracy. He has worked in a range of left coalitions and NGOs, including a leading role in the Democratic Left Front and the subsequent United Front (South Africa), and the Treatment Action Campaign and was board chair of Oxfam South Africa from its founding until November 2020.

Jara was also the co-founder of Ntinga Ntaba ka Ndoda, a community-based rural movement in the Eastern Cape. In 2015 Ntinga Ntaba ka Ndoda received the Paul K. Feyerabend Award-- a World of Solidarity is Possible.

== See also ==
- Socialism
- Eco-Socialism
