= Jan d'Oliveira =

- Born: 5 May 1946 (age 80)
- Education: University of Pretoria; Unisa
- Occupations: Advocate and former Deputy National Director of Public Prosecutions

Jan d’Oliveira is a South African lawyer and senior advocate who headed up a Special International Investigation team into so-called “Third Force” atrocities committed by security forces in apartheid South Africa. He holds the honorary position of Extraordinary Professor in Public Law at the University of Pretoria.

== Biography ==
D’Oliveira served as attorney-general of the Transvaal Provincial Division of the High Court in Pretoria prior to his appointment by President Nelson Mandela as the Deputy National Director of the National Prosecuting Authority in 1998.

In the period 1998 to 2007 he was invited by the United Nations Office for Drugs and Crime, based in Vienna, to participate in expert working groups dealing with international cooperation in criminal matters. In 1998 he was the sole negotiator on behalf of the South African Minister of Justice in drafting an extradition treaty with Hungary. D’Oliveira serves as external member of the Law Faculty of the University of Pretoria.

== Education ==
After graduating from the University of Pretoria with a B.Juris degree, d’Oliveira was awarded his LL.B. cum laude and a Doctors of Laws from the University of South Africa in 1977.

== Personal life ==
D’Oliveira is married and has four surviving children. He has completed 20 Comrades Marathon races.
