= Robert Atkins (illustrator) =

American comics artist

Robert Q. Atkins
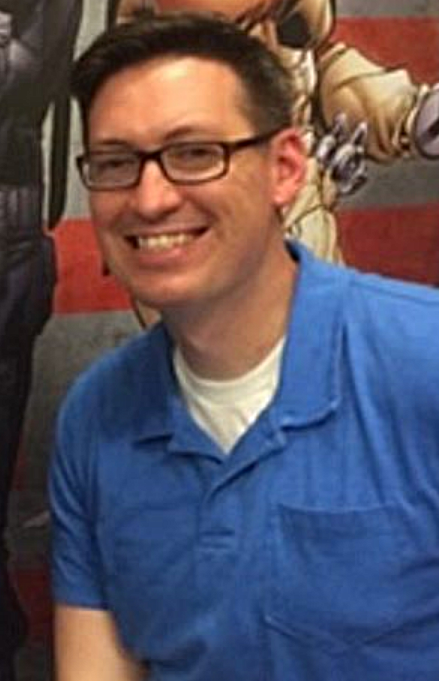
- Atkins at Killen Enterprises on May 1, 2016
- Born: Springfield, Illinois, USA
- Areas: pencils, inks, colors
- Notable works: G.I. Joe

Robert Q. Atkins, also known as "Professor Addy" or "Ratkins", is an American comics artist.

== Education and career ==
Atkins graduated from Jacksonville High School in Jacksonville, Illinois, and has attended Illinois State University, where he acquired a bachelor's degree in fine arts; attended MacMurray College, and then went on to the Savannah College of Art and Design, where he earned an MFA in Sequential Art.

Atkins' artwork has been featured in G.I. Joe comics as the main artist through 2008, Marvel comics Spider-Man, Venom, X-Men, the Fantastic Four, and he produced a series of online comics to accompany the TV show Heroes. Additionally, he was the art director for the video game Heavy Metal: F.A.K.K. 2, and did the artwork for the first issue of Hasbro Heroes Sourcebook. He has also created packaging artwork for Nerf Blaster Zombie Strike and Hot Wheels toy cars.

Atkins says he started reading comic books in high school, and he appreciates the "freedom he gets as an artist". He remarked that he is given a script, "but no one is telling me what to do." He says he decides "how the characters in the story will look", and that it is his "job to interpret the story visually."

== Bibliography ==
- The Rift #3-4 (with writer Andrew Lovoulo, Graphic Illusions Studios, 2003)
- The Amazing Spider-Man #515 (co-penciled with Stephan Roux, with writer Fred Van Lente, Marvel Comics, 2004)
- Tales of the Teenage Mutant Ninja Turtles #31 (with writer Quinn Johnson, Mirage Studios, 2004)
- Snake Eyes: Declassified #2-3 (co-penciled with Emiliano Santalucia, writer Brandon Jerwa, Devil's Due Publishing, 2005)
- G.I. Joe Special Missions: Tokyo (with writers Mike O'Sullivan and Sam Wells, Devil's Due Publishing, 2006)
- G.I. Joe Special Missions: Antarctica (with writer Mike O'Sullivan, Devil's Due Publishing, 2006)
- Triple-A Baseball Heroes (with writer Chris Eliopoulos, Marvel Comics, 2007)
- G.I. Joe: The Data Desk Handbook A-M (with writers Mike O'Sullivan and Sam Wells, Devil's Due Publishing, 2007)
- G.I. Joe: Dreadnoks Declassified #3 (with writer Josh Blaylock, Devil's Due Publishing, 2007)
- G.I. Joe: America's Elite #19-20 (inker, with writer Mike O'Sullivan, Devil's Due Publishing, 2007)
- G.I. Joe: America's Elite #17, 19-20, 33 (covers, Devil's Due Publishing, 2007, 2009)
- Legion of Super Heroes in the 31st Century #15 (with writer Jake Black, DC Comics, 2008)
- Heroes #76, 78, 84, 85 (with writers D.J. Doyle, Jeffrey T. Krul, and R.D. Hall, Wildstorm, 2008)
- G.I. Joe #1-7, 13-14 (with writer Chuck Dixon, IDW Publishing, 2008–2010)
- Transformers Spotlight: Doubledealer (inker, writer Simon Furman, IDW Publishing, 2008)
- Forgotten Realms: Starless Night #1 (cover, writers Andrew Dabb, R.A. Salvatore, Devil's Due Publishing, 2009)
- All-New Savage She-Hulk #1 (co-penciled with Peter Vale, writer Fred Van Lente, Marvel Comics, 2009)
- Ultimatum: Fantastic Four Requiem #1 (with writer Joe Pokaski, Marvel Comics, 2009)
- The Amazing Spider-Man #603 (with writer Fred van Lente, Marvel Comics, 2009)
