= Ben Mafani =

South African activist

Ben Mafani is an activist from Glenmore in the Eastern Cape province of South Africa. He is a member of the Unemployed Peoples' Movement. He has been referred to as 'the Mandela of Glenmore'.

== History ==
In 1979 Mafani was arrested while leading the resistance to a forced removal in Coega, near Port Elizabeth. People were forcibly removed to Glenmore in the former Bantustan known as the Ciskei. A number of people died soon after the forced removal, as a result of the conditions in Glenmore, including Mafani's wife and three children.

After apartheid he wrote numerous letters to officials requesting restitution for the forced removal. When these were ignored he threw three painted stones through the window of the High Court in Grahamstown in 2004 and 2007 and again in 2012. He has been found guilty of breaking windows in the High Court on three occasions.

He has spent several periods in prison.

He also attempted, thus far without success, to get restitution through the courts.

== Further reading and information ==
- 'Freedom fighter' has a question for Koornhof, Ben MacLennan Cape Town, South Africa - Nov 20 2007, Mail & Guardian
- Ghost of Glenmore holds one-man picket, Asanda Naketi, 30 October 2009, Grocott's Mail
- Glenmore, the story of the forgotten, Haily Gaunt, 20 August 2010,Grocott's Mail
- Mr. Velile Ben Mafani Will Throw Three Stones Through the Window of the High Court in Grahamstown Tomorrow, Unemployed People's Movement Press Statement, 5 January 2012
- A community betrayed, David Macgregor, 14 January 2012,The Daily Dispatch

== Short film ==
- Ben Mafani fights for development and dignity, June 2013
