= Macassar Village land occupation =

Land occupation in South Africa

Coordinates: 34.0503°S 18.7556°E

The squatter's movement Abahlali baseMjondolo occupied a piece of vacant state owned land in Macassar Village, near Somerset West outside of Cape Town on 18 May 2009. The occupation was later destroyed by the city's anti-land invasion unit.

== Background ==
Before occupying the land Abahlali baseMjondolo organised an open and public 'cleaning campaign' on the land during which the land was cleared. On the day of the occupation four people, including prominent academic Martin Legassick were arrested. The arrests, which were accompanied by shooting with rubbfollowed two attempts by the occupiers to barricade the N2 in protest at the demolition of their shacks by the police. The Cape Times quoted Clarissa Benjamin, a 47-year-old mother of three as saying "We have no place to stay. The government has millions to spend on building stadiums for 2010, but I have been waiting for a house for the past 20 years.".

Bush Radio reported that the local councillor had agreed, on 20 May, to hand the land over to the residents on 21 May and that the occupiers expected Cape Town Mayor Dan Plato to hand the land over in person. However the City of Cape Town sent in its Anti-Land Invasions Unit to demolish the shacks on 21 May. According to Abahlali baseMjondolo the City demolished the shacks on the land each day since the land was occupied and the occupiers rebuilt their shacks each day. Because the City had no court orders for any of these demolitions they were, according to an article in the Cape Argus, "in strict legal terms, criminal".

== Responses ==
Professor Martin Legassick commented that "If housing cannot be provided immediately for all, people must be allowed to find land on which to build shacks, whether that land is municipal, state, provincial or private." Mayor Dan Plato argued that "certain elements had orchestrated the land invasion through misinformation" and that 'If the group was allowed to squat there, they would "start shouting for services" such as electricity and toilets.

== Legal action ==
On 29 May Abahlali baseMjondolo secured an urgent interdict in the Cape High Court that prevented the City Council from demolishing any shacks without an order of the court. However the City ignored the interdict and continued to demolish shacks. On 1 June 2009 Mzonke Poni, chairperson of Abahlali baseMjondolo in the Western Cape, was arrested on a charge of public violence. He alleged that he was assaulted by the police while in their custody.

== Support for the occupation ==
On 9 June the Centre on Housing Rights and Evictions in Geneva issued a letter strongly condemning the actions of the Cape Town City Council. The following day the occupation received a strong statement of support from The Catholic Justice and Peace Commission. On 16 June 2009 Abahlali baseMjondolo Cape Town held an event to 'de-celebrate' the national public holiday of Youth Day. At the time the Cape Argus reported that one of the people evicted from Macassar was sharing a single roomed backyard shack with 26 other people.

== Legal Controversy ==
On 18 June the City of Cape Town terminated its working relationship with the legal firm that had represented the occupiers resulting in a 'storm' of harsh criticism from human rights advocates.

== Outcomes ==
During 2009 the land occupation continued under 24-hour surveillance from the Anti-Land Invasions Unit, which had just received R10 million in funding from the Cape Town City Council. Although people continued to live on the land they were not able to rebuild their shacks and were sleeping out in the open.
