= Dlamini King Brothers =

- Also known as: DKB
- Origin: Kennedy Road, Durban, South Africa
- Genres: Isicathamiya
- Years active: 1999—

The Dlamini King Brothers are an isicathamiya choir from the Kennedy Road shack settlement in Durban, South Africa. They were formed in 1999 and have won several awards. In January 2009 they released their début album Hlis’uMoya which contains a mixture of religious and political songs. They often perform at events organised by the squatter's movement Abahlali baseMjondolo and have written songs for the group.
