= Johannesburg Institute for Advanced Study =

Collaborative educational centre in South Africa

Johannesburg Institute for Advanced Study (JIAS)
- Founded: 14 May 2015; 11 years ago
- Headquarters: Johannesburg,
- Key people: Professor Victoria Collis-Buthelezi (director)
- Parent: University of Johannesburg
- Website: jias.joburg

The Johannesburg Institute for Advanced Study (JIAS), launched in 2015, is a collaborative initiative involving the University of Johannesburg (UJ) in South Africa and Nanyang Technological University (NTU) in Singapore.

== Overview ==
Established on 14 May 2015, JIAS deviates from conventional educational and research routines, focusing instead on promoting cooperative and concentrated scholarly pursuits within the Humanities and Natural Sciences.

JIAS also collaborates with other tertiary institutions nationwide.

JIAS operates from a residential facility situated in the outskirts of Johannesburg. The inaugural meeting of JIAS, co-chaired by UJ's Vice-Chancellor, Professor Ihron Rensburg, and NTU's President, Professor Bertil Andersson, coincided with the institute's launch day. Attendees included Professor K. K. Phua, director of the NTU Institute for Advanced Study, Professor Tshilidzi Marwala, former Deputy Vice-Chancellor (Research, Postgraduate Studies & Library) and later Vice-Chancellor and Principal of UJ, Dr Yu-Hyun Park from NTU's President's Office, and Professor Peter Vale, Director of JIAS.

Taking over from Dr Bongani Ngqulunga, Professor Victoria Collis-Buthelezi has served as the director of JIAS since September 2024.

JIAS funds Writing Fellowships, recipients of which have been drawn from different disciplines: academics, novelists, scientists, poets, playwrights, independent researchers and journalists. JIAS is host to the annual Johannesburg Festival of Women Writers, inaugurated in February 2023 by Barbara Masekela.
