= Amandla (magazine) =

Bimonthly South African magazine

Amandla! is a South African bi-monthly magazine that was launched in 2006. The founders are Mazibuko Jara and Brian Ashley. The magazine is published by the Alternative Information and Development Centre (AIDC) in Cape Town, and takes its name from the Zulu word amandla, which means power, and the masthead of the paper is 'Taking Power Seriously'.

It provides coverage and analysis of current political, economic and social processes from radical left perspectives. Articles offer perspectives on alternative strategies to deepen the process of social transformation in South Africa and on the African continent. issues have covered a wide range of issues, including climate change, food sovereignty, national healthcare and working class struggles, as well as debates around South Africa's labour unions, social movements and popular organizations.

The magazine is written by and for activists in political, labour and popular organisations, as well as progressive intellectuals at the universities, in NGOs, parliament, community-based organisations, churches, journalists, lawyers, public officials in state institutions, etc. Contributors thus far have included Noam Chomsky, Jeremy Cronin, Ronnie Kasrils, Mark Heywood and Joel Netshitenzhe. Articles offer perspectives on alternative strategies to deepen the process of social transformation in South Africa and on the African continent, and have covered, for example, the Eskom electricity crisis in South Africa, critiques of the property taxation system, and international news from Thailand and Greece.

Amandla! also runs a series of discussion forums on topical issues in Cape Town and Johannesburg.
