= National Interfaith Council of South Africa =

The National Interfaith Council of South Africa (NICSA) is a co-operative interfaith religious body in South Africa formed by the merger of the National Religious Leaders Forum (NRLF) and the National Interfaith Leadership Council (NILC).

== History ==
The National Religious Leaders Forum (NRLF) interfaith body was formed in post-apartheid South Africa. When President Jacob Zuma took office in 2009, Pastor Ray McCauley of Rhema Bible Church formed a new interfaith organization called the National Interfaith Leadership Council (NILC) which subsequently merged with the National Religious Leaders Forum (NRLF) to form NICSA in 2011.

== Membership ==
NICSA comprises members from various religious groups in South Africa including mainstream Christian groups, African indigenous churches, Jewish, Muslim, Hindu, Pentecostal, Scientology– and charismatic Christian churches.

== Leadership ==
Pastor Ray McCauley of Rhema Bible Church and Archbishop Buti Tlhagale of the Roman Catholic Archdiocese of Johannesburg were elected as interim co-chairmen of the organizing committee of NICSA which will oversee the finalization of the constitution and the organization of a plenary meeting of faith and religious leaders where a leadership structure will be elected.

== Relationship with Government ==
On 13 September 2011, the National Assembly of the Parliament of South Africa welcomed the formation of NICSA in response to President Jacob Zuma's call for the religious community to partner with the Government of South Africa "to establish a cohesive and caring society, including establishing an enabling environment for sustainable development".

Church leaders have criticized the African National Congress (ANC) ruling party for co-opting religious bodies such as NICSA to serve the party in a political sense and alienating those who do not, while NICSA and other interfaith bodies have been criticized for publicly supporting Government on matters where they have no mandate.

== See also ==
- Religion in South Africa
- South African Council of Churches
