= South African Unemployed Peoples' Movement =

Social movement in South Africa

The South African Unemployed Peoples' Movement is a social movement with branches in Durban, Grahamstown and Limpopo Province in South Africa. It is often referred to as the Unemployed People's Movement or UPM. The organisation is strongly critical of the ruling African National Congress government.

== Activities in Durban ==
On 15 July 2009, the movement announced that it would begin appropriating food from supermarkets in Durban if the state did not agree to consult with it on its demand for a basic income grant of R1,500 per month for all unemployed people.

On 22 July 2009, the movement occupied the Checkers supermarket in Dr Pixley KaSeme Street and the Pick'n'Pay supermarket at The Workshop and began to eat food off the shelves without paying. Police said they arrested 44 people at Checkers and 50 people at Pick'n'Pay. Nozipho Mteshana, then the chairwoman of the movement, said that the appropriation of food in supermarkets would continue despite the arrests. She was placed under house arrest for 18 months following the protest.

The movement has, working together with Abahlali baseMjondolo, also organised a number of protests from the Zakheleni shack settlement in Umlazi, Durban.

== Activities in Grahamstown ==
There is also a branch of the Unemployed People's Movement in Grahamstown in the Eastern Cape. It argues for a bottom up system of democracy. Along with the struggle for employment, housing and electricity women's issues, including the demand for toilets and campaigns against rape, have emerged as key issues in Grahamstown. The movement has had some success in campaigning against corruption in Grahamstown. The movement has also opposed xenophobia.

Its current chairperson is Ayanda Kota and the Grahamstown branch works closely with radical students.

According to commentator Mazibuko Jara, "it has become the most powerful force in the Makana municipality. Its formation represented a collective recognition of the appetite for self-emancipation, and without self-organisation, the unemployed in Grahamstown might as well have remained on the margins of that divided small town. In its short two years of existence, the movement has marched, written deputations, submitted memorandums of demands, held sit-ins, held meetings with the state, used the law and more. It has challenged unemployment, poor-quality housing, lack of housing, lack of water and sanitation, lack of electricity and street lighting, violence against women and problems with the social security system. The movement has humanised politics by concerning themselves with how to rebuild the social fabric of a poor community."

== Repression ==
The movement has suffered arrests in both Grahamstown and Durban. It claims that in Grahamstown the Municipality has often frustrated its right to protest.

== See also ==
- Ayanda Kota
- Ben Mafani
