= Barbara Masekela =

South African poet, educator and activist (born 1941)

- Masekela in 2005
- Born: Barbara Mosima Joyce Masekela; 18 July 1941 (age 85); Alexandra Township, Johannesburg, South Africa
- Education: University of Zambia: Ohio University
- Occupations: Poet, educator and activist
- Notable work: Poli Poli (2021)
- Children: 2
- Relatives: Hugh Masekela (brother)
- Awards: Order of Luthuli

Barbara Mosima Joyce Masekela OLS (born 18 July 1941) is a South African poet, educator, and activist who has held positions of arts leadership within the African National Congress (ANC). Nelson Mandela appointed her the first new South African Ambassador to France and UNESCO in 1995.

Her debut memoir, Poli Poli, dedicated to her brother Hugh Masekela, was published in 2021. In 2023, she inaugurated the Johannesburg Festival of Women Writers.

== Early life and education ==
Barbara Masekela was born on 18 July 1941 in the Alexandra Township of Johannesburg, South Africa, the second of four children born to Pauline and Thomas Masekela. Her father had been an artist; her older brother Hugh Masekela grew up to be an accomplished jazz musician. As an infant, she was sent to live with her grandmother in Witbank (now known as EMalahleni). At the age of 10, Barbara returned to Alexandra Township to attend Saint-Michael's Anglican School. Her parents fostered a politically conscious household; from an early age Barbara was knowledgeable about the political climate of South Africa. While attending Inanda Girls’ Seminary in Durban, she had the opportunity to meet many of South African civil rights activists, such as ANC leader Albert Luthuli, which would shape her future political and educational careers. In 1960, Masekela completed her high-school education and went on to work at the New Age newspaper.

Six months later, she enrolled in the Basutoland campus of the University of Basutoland, Bechuanaland and Swaziland. After one semester at the university, she moved to Ghana to help the newly independent country introduce Western-style methods of learning. In February 1963, Masekela contracted tuberculosis and was then sent to the United Kingdom, where she received treatment over the next year. After she was rehabilitated, she stayed in the UK for a few months, before moving in 1965 to New York City, where she enrolled in Fordham University. Her educational career at Fordham University was short-lived; in her Anthropology classes she experienced racism from her professors, who considered non-Western societies to be primitive and uncivilized. Masekela fell ill again and returned to Africa, continuing her education at the University of Zambia in 1967.

While in her third year at the University of Zambia, she was in a car accident; the resulting injuries forced her to stay with her brother in California until she recuperated. After her injuries had healed, she remained in the United States to finish her BA degree with a major in English from Ohio University in 1971. In 1972, she began teaching at Staten Island Community College. In 1973, she moved on to teaching English literature at Rutgers University until 1982. During her time at Rutgers, she only took a leave of absence to complete her master's degree in 1976.

== Political career ==
After being away from South Africa for 22 years, Masekela still kept up with and supported her country through the newspapers where African National Congress (ANC) issues were appearing in the headlines almost every day. From the media, Masekela learned about their push for the economic sanctions that would weaken the South African government, and their ever-strengthening ties with the Scandinavian countries, all of which had long been associated with human rights issues. It was noted that Zimbabwe and Mozambique gained independence and were fighting the apartheid system along with South Africa. It was then, in the early 1980s that Masekela joined the anti-apartheid movement and gave speeches and demonstrations in America, giving her the reputation of being a serious activist. In August 1982 Masekela made her trip back to Lusaka, Zambia, where she worked as administrative secretary for the ANC on a full-time basis. After only working for the ANC for a year, she was asked to head the ANC’s Department of Arts and Culture, which role she accepted.

In 1990, shortly after his release from his 27-year prison term, Nelson Mandela came to the United States and to India to thank everyone who had helped him and the ANC. Masekela was asked to accompany him, to handle arrangements and scheduling, and also to help raise funds and support from students and politicians for the organization in the multiracial, democratic elections that almost certainly lay ahead. Streamlined and efficient, she impressed Mandela so much that he asked her to become the head of staff in his office. In the same year, Masekela gave a speech that made clear the relationship she always claimed between art and the culture of any society, that art in any form expressed the long-term values of a society, whether political, legal, or social.

She served the South African government at the highest level when, after his inauguration as President, at which she presided, Mandela appointed her the first new South African Ambassador to France and UNESCO in 1995. Subsequently, on 8 September 2003, President Thabo Mbeki appointed her South Africa's ambassador to the United States. Between ambassadorial appointments, she served as an executive director for public and corporate affairs for De Beer Consolidated Mines. She served as a trustee of the Nelson Mandela Children's Fund and the Nelson Mandela Foundation. Masekela also held various executive and non-executive directorships, including director of the Standard Bank of South Africa, the South African Broadcasting Corporation and the International Marketing Council. She was latterly chair of the board of the National State Theatre.

== Writing and literary work ==
Masekela's poetry is included in such publications at Sterling Plumpp's Somehow We Survive: An Anthology of South African Writing (New York: Thunder's Mouth Press, 1982).

Her memoir, entitled Poli Poli, dedicated to her brother Hugh, was published in 2021 (Jonathan Ball Publishers, ISBN 9781776190959), to critical acclaim. As characterised by Nuruddin Farah, "Poli Poli by Barbara Masekela is an adorable book full of childhood thrills and teeming with vignettes of memory retold in brilliant prose. It reminds me of Aké by Wole Soyinka, which in and of itself is high praise indeed." The Johannesburg Review of Books concluded: "As part of the rich legacy of black women’s life writing in South Africa, Masekela's Poli Poli joins the chorus of voices that includes Noni Jabavu, Ellen Kuzwayo, Fatima Meer, Brigalia Bam, and many others. Women who wrote their own stories, and in so doing wrote the histories of their families and communities, narratives that are often undermined in mainstream history." Poli Poli was longlisted for the 2022 Sunday Times Literary Awards. A follow-up memoir by Masekela "will reportedly give more light about her colourful life in the past sixty years."

Masekela, supported by Elinor Sisulu, in February 2023 inaugurated the Johannesburg Festival of Women Writers, hosted by the Johannesburg Institute for Advanced Study (JIAS) at the Johannesburg Business School.

== Awards ==
Masekela is a recipient of the Order of Luthuli in Silver, which national honour she was awarded in 2008 for her "excellent contribution to the eradication of apartheid and contributing to the development of the new South African values".

In April 2024, Rhodes University awarded her an honorary doctorate, Doctor of Laws (LLD), "for her lifelong commitment to cultural activism, literature, and the fight for human dignity".

In March 2025, she was awarded an honorary doctorate by the University of Johannesburg for "her lifelong dedication to the arts, literature, and social change".
