= Mnikelo Ndabankulu =

Mnikelo Ndabankulu lives in Durban, South Africa. He was the spokesperson for Abahlali baseMjondolo up until May 2014 and appears in the film Dear Mandela.

== Early life ==
He was born in the town of Flagstaff on the Wild Coast and now lives in the Foreman Road shack settlement in Durban, which has 7000 inhabitants. In 2013 he appeared in the Mail & Guardian 200 Young South Africans.

== Activism ==
Ndabankulu was a founding member of Abahlali baseMjondolo. He was critical of the impact of the FIFA 2010 World Cup on shack dwellers in Durban.

== Dear Mandela ==
Ndabankulu features prominently in the award winning documentary feature film Dear Mandela which tells the story of three young activists in Abahlali baseMjondolo.

== International Human Rights Award ==
In March 2012 Amnesty International recognized his work with the 'Golden Butterfly' Human Rights Prize in a ceremony at the Hague in the Netherlands.
