= Mzonke Poni =

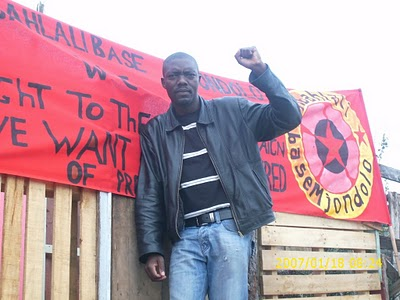
Mzonke Poni outside the Abahlali baseMjondolo office in Khayelitsha, Cape Town

Mzonke Poni is an activist in Cape Town. He is the former chairperson of Abahlali baseMjondolo of the Western Cape and was previously a leader of the Western Cape Anti-Eviction Campaign. The Sunday Times has described him as "the face of an ANC nightmare - an angry activist mobilising the township masses to protest at what he calls the government's failure to create a better life for the poor."

Poni lives in the QQ Section Informal Settlement in Khayelitsha.

== Arrest in June 2009 ==
On 1 June 2009 he was arrested on the site of the Macassar Village Land Occupation and charged with public violence. Abahlali baseMjondolo claimed that the arrest was an act of political intimidation and that Poni was assaulted while in police custody. On 29 September 2009 all charges against Poni were dropped. He represented himself in his trial.

== Call for a Week of Informal Settlement's Strike in October 2010 ==
In October 2010 Abahlali baseMjondolo in Cape Town called for a month of direct action. Poni publicly endorsed road blockades a legitimate tactic during this month of action. The Treatment Action Campaign and the South African Communist Party, both of which are affiliated to the ruling African National Congress, issued strong statements condemning the campaign with the former labelling it 'violent' and the latter labelling it 'anarchist' and reactionary'. Abahlali baseMjondolo responded by saying that their support for road blockades roads was not support for violence and that "We have never called for violence. Violence is harm to human beings. Blockading a road is not violence." They also said that in their view the attack from the SACP was really due to the movement's insistence on organising autonomously from the African National Congress.

== See also ==
- Western Cape Anti-Eviction Campaign
- Abahlali baseMjondolo
