= Slum clearance in South Africa =

Urban renewal strategy in South Africa

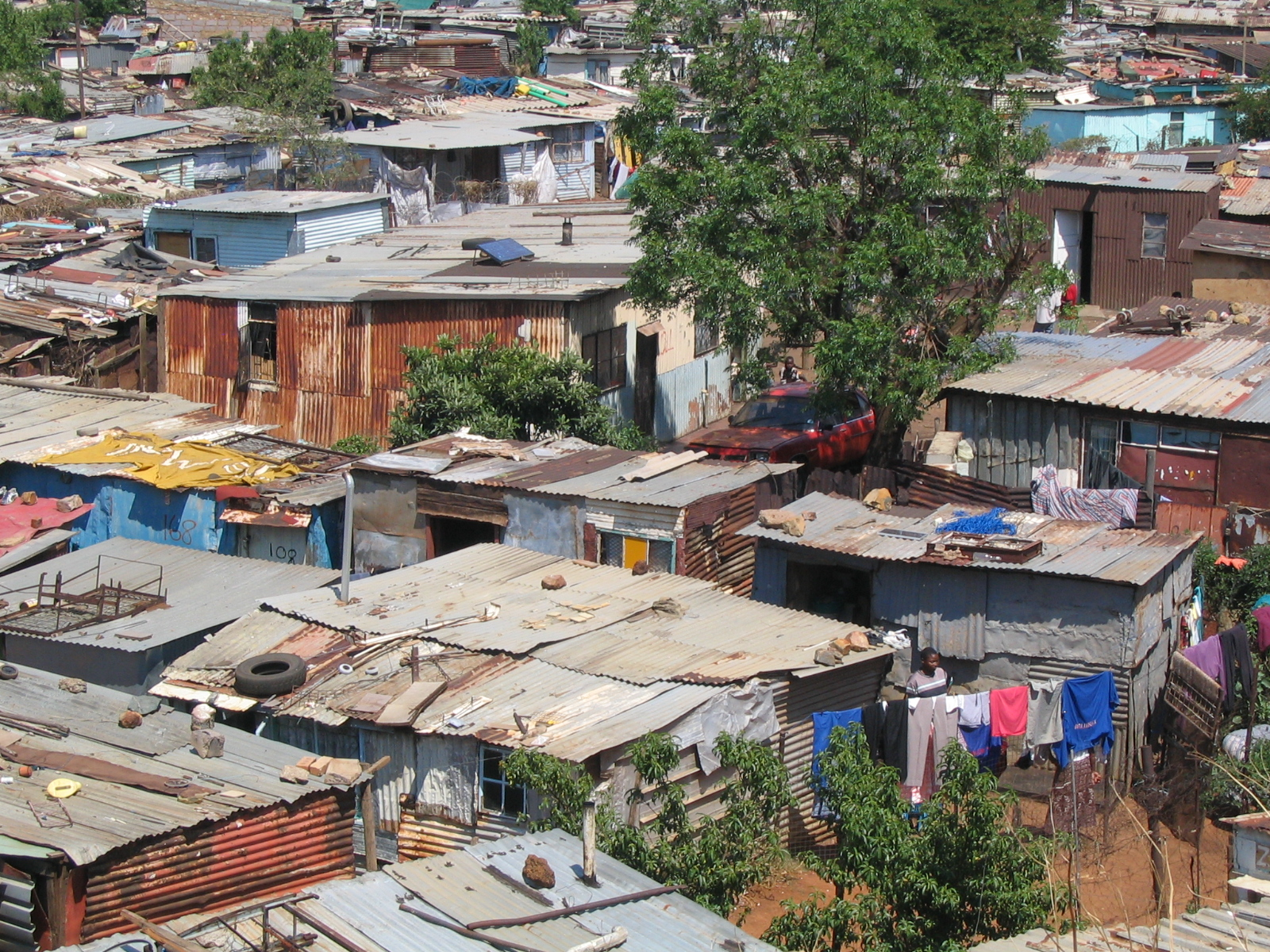
A slum in Soweto, pictured in 2005

Slum clearance in South Africa has been used as an urban renewal strategy to regenerate derelict or run-down districts, often to be replaced with alternative developments or new housing.

== Context ==
In 1938, a significant scheme was initiated in Cape Town which involved the construction of around 12,000 houses for £6,000,000 ($30,000,000). The worst slum district, District VI, was included in the first phase, which involved constructing the equivalent of a new town to house 31,000 people. The city council was permitted by the Central Housing Board to include as many four-storey blocks of flats as it desired and by 1942 was set to construct 13,000 dwellings as part of clearance projects.

=== Apartheid era ===
In the mid-1950s, the city of Johannesburg was reported to have the world's worst slums, which, once considered too "squalid", would be taken over by city planners and involuntarily removed. There were, however, ulterior motives for the targeting of Black townships; for instance, in the Western Areas of Johannesburg, removals were particularly motivated by widespread resistance within such Black communities against government authorities, indicated by four instances of popular unrest in six months from 1949 to 1950. Further, such removals were enabled and justified by the Group Areas Act. Concerning the clearance of the Western Areas, the city council agreed in 1952 to a government initiative titled "Site and Service", a slum clearance scheme whereby evicted families would be designated accommodation with a lavatory and a communal water supply. This was, however, later dropped by the government. Rather, for instance, in Sophiatown, 2,000 armed police surrounded the area and 150 families at a time were given eviction notices with just 12 hours to leave. Families were subsequently forcibly relocated 12 miles beyond the city limits to Meadowlands and their former homes were demolished immediately after they vacated. Under Apartheid, the non-White families evicted were deemed unfit to reside in the city, yet were relocated close enough that they could still commute to work. A program to deliver 30,000 homes, part of a wider slum clearance plan, got underway in 1957.

By the early 1970s, South Africa was well advanced into various major clearance projects. In Umlazi, just south of Durban, 20,000 new bungalows were laid out in a style reminiscent of California. The new properties were available for a $10 monthly rent. Similar housing projects, but on a considerably larger scale, were happening in Soweto. By this time, the country had a wide-ranging clearance program, with many remaining slums being prepared for demolition.

== Ethnic divisions ==
Reports in 1959 suggested that some slums vacated by native Africans, particularly in the city of Pretoria, were being subsequently populated by poor white families rather than being demolished. In contrast, some districts of a predominantly white population had been known to expand into a location previously reserved for natives. On some occasions, churches were a victim of this expansion, having initially been built cheaply or at no cost and therefore not being entitled to much if any compensation, yet to reconstruct it in a new location "may cost several hundred times as much as the compensation received for the old", due to municipal laws requiring formal planning on new building construction.

== See also ==
- Slum clearance in the United States
- Slum clearance in the United Kingdom
- Slum clearance in India
