= Khadija Patel =

South African investigative journalist

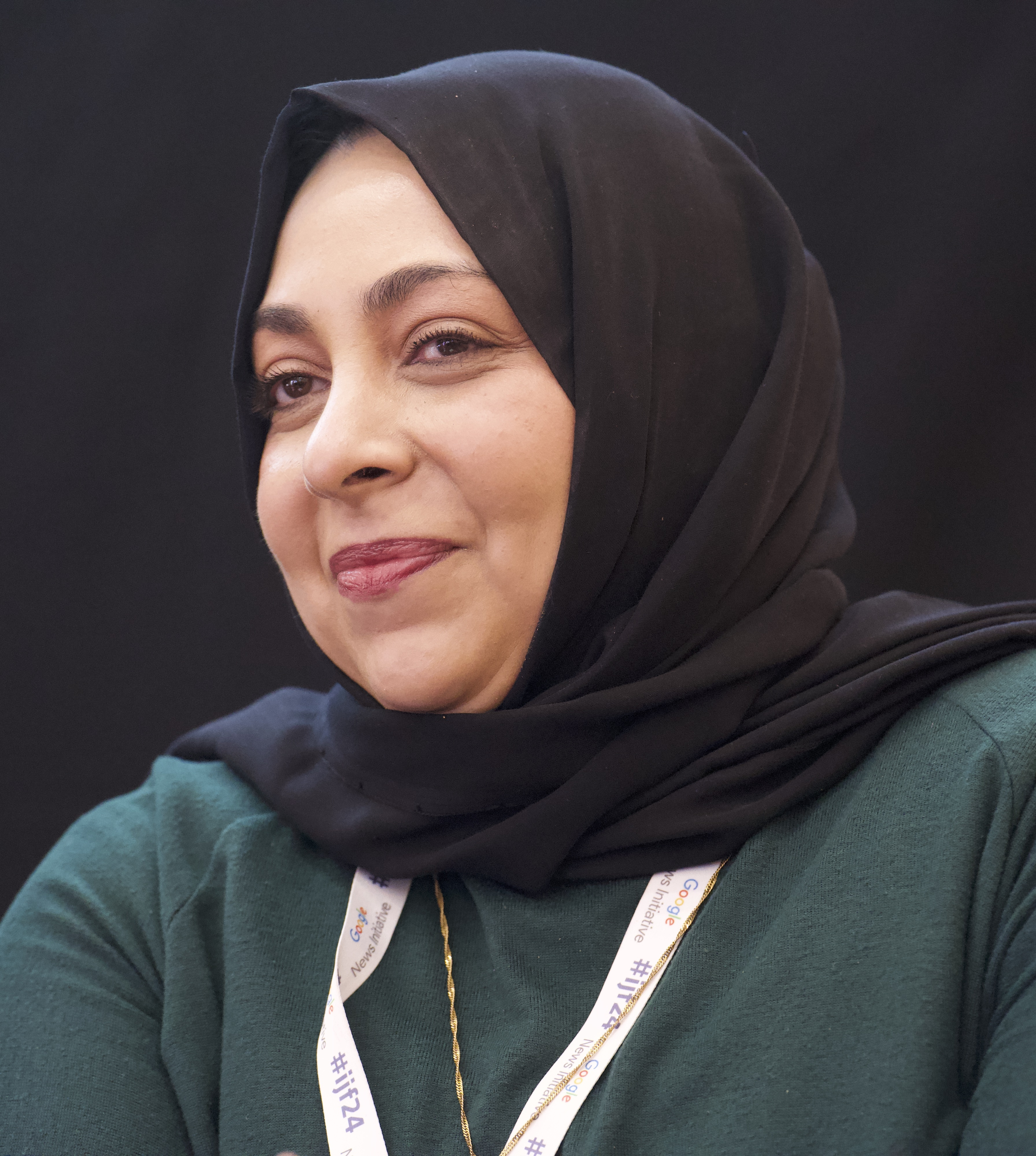
- Patel at International Journalism Festival in 2024
- Education: University of South Africa
- Occupation: Journalist
- Employer: International Fund for Public Interest Media

Khadija Patel is a South African investigative journalist with publications for international media houses Sky News, Al Jazeera, Quartz, BBC World News and The Guardian. Khadija is currently a director at the International Fund for Public Interest Media. She was previously the chairperson of the International Press Institute and the former editor-in-chief of the Mail & Guardian. She also an associate researcher at the Witwatersrand Institute for Social and Economic Research. The former president of the United States Barack Obama acknowledged Khadija in 2013 for her investigative journalism in countries such as Sudan, Mali and the Democratic Republic of Congo. She is also one of the founders of South Africa's news website The Daily Vox.

== Career ==
Khadija worked as the Editor-in-chief at the Mail & Guardian for four years. Under her leadership the Mail and Guardian grasped several awards at the 2017 South African Journalism awards during her first year. She is recognized for launching a profitable online subscription during COVID-19 to ease the effects of the pandemic on the publication.

Khadija has worked as an investigate journalist for South African news agencies the Daily Maverick and City Press. She has also worked for Sky News, BBC News, Quartz, Al Jazeera and The Guardian. In 2017 Khadija was also among the top 100 New Africa Magazine list of most influential people in Africa. She also received the Ford Foundation inaugural Africa #NoFilter fellowship.
