= Michael Sutcliffe =

Michael Sutcliffe is the former municipal manager of the eThekwini Metropolitan Municipality (population 4 million), which includes the city of Durban, South Africa. During his time in the position he was widely reported to be a controversial figure amongst Durbanites and was the target of popular protest in the city. He left as municipal manager of eThekwini after an audit implicated Sutcliffe and three officials in irregular housing contracts worth R3.5-billion over 10 years.

Deployed to the position in 2002 by the ruling African National Congress he remained in office till 2011. During his time as municipal manager, he was seen as openly politicising the city's administration to redirect contracts to ANC party members and reporting to political party structures rather than the elected city mayor. He oversaw the municipality's successful preparations for the 2010 FIFA World Cup, and was involved in controversy regarding street renamings, the loss of the city's Blue Flag beach status, illegally banning protests, banning posters, serious human rights abuses in the city's housing program, the failed privatisation of the city's bus system allegations of spin-doctoring, the unprofitable uShaka Marine World, threats to withdraw advertising from newspapers employing journalists critical of the municipality, lack of action against environmental destruction, favoritism toward ANC-aligned individuals and businesses - including S'bu and Shauwn Mpisane [now Shauwn Mkhize], the latter a convicted fraudster - unlawful and at times violent violations of the basic rights of street traders and shack dwellers and corruption.

In March 2011 the Sunday Times reported that he was under investigation for irregularities in housing contracts. Sutcliffe has denied that there has been fraud but has admitted to 'financial irregularities'. Sutcliffe was implicated in the Manase Report, a forensic investigation into financial irregularities in the municipality, and found that Sutcliffe failed to report fraudulent and corrupt activities in terms of the Prevention of Organised Crime Act and contravened the Municipal Financial Management Act for not promptly reporting irregular expenditure, which allowed corruption to continue under his management. The Manase Report concluded that Sutcliffe as municipal manager had "attempted to mislead the Municipal Public Accounts Committee" in covering up irregular expenditure. An earlier forensic report commissioned by the municipality which similarly implicated Sutcliffe was blocked from release while he was still municipal manager.

Sutcliffe formerly held the position of chairperson of the Municipal Demarcation Board and was a member of the KwaZulu-Natal Provincial Legislature.

Born in Addington Hospital, in Durban, he has a PhD in geography from Ohio State University. In 2008 he received an award from the Association of American Geographers for distinguished public service.
