= United Front (South Africa) =

The United Front was an attempt to unite the South African left outside of the ruling African National Congress. It formally launched in 2015, following preparatory activities in 2014, including a summit in November with 350 delegates representing labour unions, social movements and popular organisations, faith-based organisations, NGOs and anti-capitalist formations. It effectively supplanted the Democratic Left Front, a smaller formation which had been established in 2011, itself founded following the collapse of the Anti-Privatisation Forum.

== Formation ==
The United Front was launched with the support of the National Union of Metalworkers of South Africa (NUMSA), which severed ties with the African National Congress and South African Communist Party at its December 2013 congress to foster left-wing alternatives. NUMSA general secretary Irvin Jim stated that the United Front would not seek to revive or rescue the ANC or the SACP. He said that both organisations were “already lost”, arguing that neither championed socialism and that the ruling alliance had become “anti working-class”. Jim further stated that this trajectory had seen “a once proud people reduced to begging from the state” for social grants. Given the connection to NUMSA, both the Congress of South African Trade Unions (COSATU) which had expelled NUMSA, and the South African Communist Party, remained outside the United Front, the party proposing an alternative "left popular front" (LPF) which never materialised.

== Conflicts ==
While NUMSA defined itself as Marxist-Leninist, it envisaged the United Front as open to a range of forces, and as distinct from NUMSA itself. However, significant differences of opinion emerged in the United Front from an early stage.
