= Democratic Left Front =

Anti-capitalist front in South Africa

The Democratic Left Front was formed as a non-sectarian and non-authoritarian anti-capitalist front in South Africa. It was formed from the Conference for a Democratic Left launched in 2008, at an event held in Johannesburg in January 2011. It played a role in solidarity campaigns, most notably concerning the Marikana massacre. With the rise of the United Front, and following divisions within the DLF, the formation disappeared.

== Debates ==
The South African Unemployed Peoples' Movement welcomed the DLF as an "historic opportunity". The Zabalaza Anarchist Communist Front expressed reservations about the entirely middle class nature of the leadership of the DLF and lack of internal democracy.

== Campaigns ==
The DLF engaged in several public campaigns. These included strong support for the rights of LGTBI people against violence. The DLF was actively involved in the Occupy Johannesburg movement in coordination with Taking Back South Africa! on 15 October 2011 as part of the global Occupy movement. The DLF supported the Marikana miners' strike in 2012 and was centrally involved in the Marikana Support Committee.

== See also ==
- Socialism
- Trotskyism
- Eco-Socialism
