= Ray McCauley =

South African pastor (1949–2024)

- Born: Raynor McCauley; 1 October 1949; Johannesburg, Union of South Africa
- Died: 8 October 2024 (aged 75); Johannesburg, South Africa
- Education: Rhema Bible Training Center
- Occupations: Minister; Pastor
- Years active: 1978–2024
- Notable work: IFCC; Rhema Bible Church; NICSA
- Spouses: Lyndie McCauley; Zelda Ireland
- Children: 2

Raynor McCauley (1 October 1949 – 8 October 2024) was a South African religious leader who was Senior Pastor of Rhema Bible Church, President of the International Federation of Christian Churches (IFCC), co-chair of the National Interfaith Council of South Africa (NICSA), author and a champion bodybuilder.

== Early life ==
McCauley was born in Johannesburg on 1 October 1949. He took a keen interest in bodybuilding, was a Mr. South Africa and took part in the Mr Universe bodybuilding championships in London in 1974 where he finished in third place. He was also a nightclub bouncer for a time.

== Ministry ==
McCauley attended Bible college with his first wife Lyndie at Rhema Bible Training Center in Broken Arrow, Oklahoma during 1978/9. On their return to South Africa, the McCauleys started Rhema Bible Church under Rhema Ministries SA in the home of his parents, Jimmy and Doreen, which 13 people attended. Membership grew and the church moved into the former Constantia Cinema in Rosebank, Johannesburg. Under the leadership of Ray and Lyndie McCauley, the church outgrew its premises and moved to a warehouse in Jan Smuts Avenue in Randburg, near Johannesburg before moving to its current premises. In 1985 the church moved into the newly constructed 5,000-seat auditorium in Randburg. The new church was dedicated on 16 June 1985 by Kenneth E. Hagin, the founder of Rhema Ministries in Broken Arrow. The auditorium was later upgraded to more than 7,500 seats to accommodate the growth of the church. Today the church has a 45,000-strong congregation, which is the single largest church congregation in southern Africa.

Towards the end of the apartheid era, McCauley and his associates were involved in numerous critical events that helped with the peaceful transition to a democratic nation in 1994. During this time he interacted with leading churchmen like Archbishop Emeritus Desmond Tutu and Reverend Frank Chikane.

McCauley was a well-known speaker at church events around the world.

== Personal life and death ==
After divorcing Lyndie in 2000 despite the lack of biblical grounds, he married Zelda Ireland in 2001. He had a son, Joshua, from Lyndie, as well as three grandchildren.

McCauley died on 09 October 2024, at the age of 75.

In response to a request from Gauteng Premier Panyaza Lesufi, South African President Cyril Ramaphosa has declared Pastor Ray McCauley's funeral as a Special Provincial Official Funeral Category 2. The funeral service took place at Rhema Bible Church on Saturday, October 19, 2024.

== Controversy ==
McCauley, faced criticism for leading a lavish lifestyle and for Rhema Ministries' association with the prosperity gospel, but he consistently defended himself, claiming his income was equivalent to that of a chief executive of a medium-sized company.

McCauley's greatest controversy came with the divorce from his first wife Lyndie in 2000. According to the ministry, Lyndie McCauley instituted divorce proceedings for which the ministry believed she had no biblical grounds. The divorce caused a large portion of the then congregation to depart from the church. Shortly after the divorce, McCauley became romantically involved with a two-time divorcee, Zelda Ireland, whom he married in July 2001. In January 2010, Rhema Bible Church announced that McCauley and Ireland had separated and that divorce proceedings had been instituted by Ireland. After being divorced for over 2 years, McCauley and Ireland remarried in November 2013 at a ceremony described as "very modest and low-key" in Muldersdrift outside Johannesburg.

In 2009, McCauley caused waves politically when he invited the then unelected President of South Africa, Jacob Zuma, to speak at a Sunday morning meeting. This led to accusations of political bias. When Zuma took office in 2009, McCauley formed a new interfaith organization called the National Interfaith Leadership Council (NILC) which subsequently merged with the National Religious Leaders Forum (NRLF) to form the National Interfaith Council of South Africa (NICSA) in 2011. McCauley and the interfaith organizations he represented publicly defended Zuma and the ANC government on several highly controversial matters.

McCauley was also a strong opponent of gay rights.

== Books and television ==
McCauley authored several books including Our God Is An Awesome God (1993), Walk In Faith (1998), Making Your World Different (2000), The Secret Place (2003), Expect More (2005), Bottom Line (2005), Choose This Day (2007), Live Long, Die Young (2008), Power & Passion, Holy Ghost Fire and Purpose Powered People. His biography, Destined To Win (1986), was written by Ron Steele.

Rhema Television (RTV) broadcasts A New Day with Pastor Ray featuring teachings by McCauley.
