= Edwin Ronald Makue =

South African politician

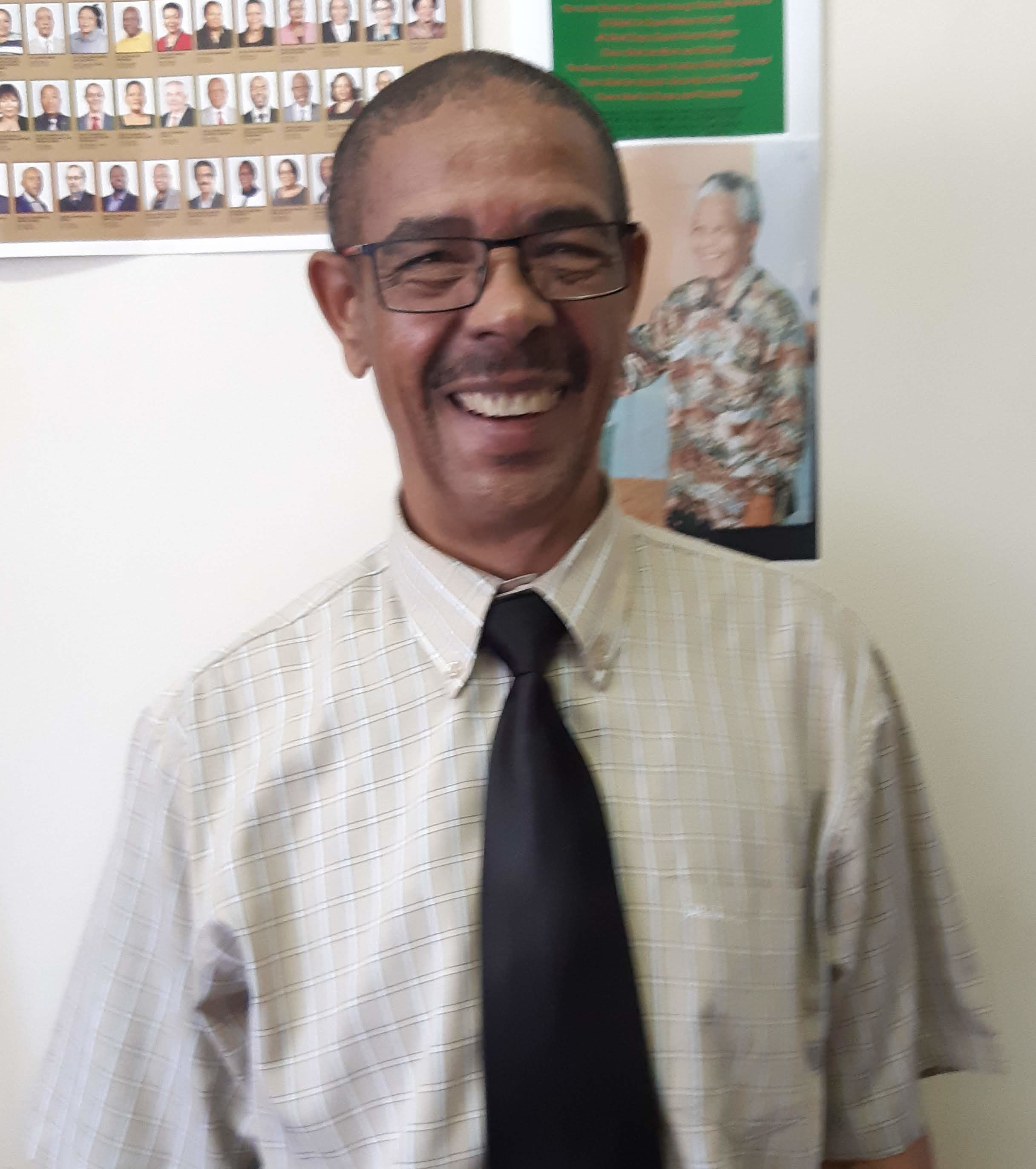

Chairperson of the Select Committee on Trade and International Relations in the National Council of Provinces
- Incumbent
- Assumed office 21 May 2014

Personal details
- Born: Johannesburg, Gauteng
- Party: African National Congress

Edwin Ronald Makue is a South African Member of Parliament (MP) representing the African National Congress in the 26th South African Parliament (2014-2019) as a member of the National Council of Provinces. Where he served as part of the provincial delegation for the province of Gauteng and was constituent representative for the Greater Sophiatown area. During the 26th Parliament he was the Chairperson of the Select Committee on Trade and International Relations and sat on the Select Committee on Economic and Business Development as well as on the Joint Committee on Ethics and the Parliamentary Group on International Relations.

== Early life ==
Makue was born in Kliptown, Johannesburg and attended Kliptown Primary School and later Kliptown High School. He obtained his bachelor's degree from the University of the Western Cape and gained a master's degree in Science from the Buckinghamshire Chilterns University College.

== South African Council of Churches ==
Prior to becoming an MP Makue was the General Secretary of the National Executive Committee of the South African Council of Churches (SACC) from 2006 to 2011. Makue began his career with the SACC when joined the organisation in 1986 as a field worker and programme facilitator during as part of the organisation's anti-apartheid activities. In 1992 he directed the SACC's Democracy Education program and went on to become the SACC's head of the Justice Ministries Unit in 1994.
