= Ayanda Kota =

Ayanda Kota (b. 1976 d. 2024) was an activist who was the founded the Unemployed Peoples' Movement in Grahamstown, South Africa in 2009 and became its first chairperson. He was also the President of the Makana Football Association. His political roots were in the black consciousness movement and he was strongly critical of the ruling African National Congress. He was the organiser for the Unemployed People's Movement.

== Arrest and assault ==
On 12 January 2012 he was arrested on a charge of theft after failing to return two books that he had borrowed from a local academic. He was subject to police assault while in custody. A number of organisations issued statements in response to the arrest. Kota later stated that he had misplaced the books in question and had repeatedly offered to replace them and that this offer had been clearly communicated to the police.

All charges against Kota were withdrawn a month after the arrest.

In October 2016 the Minister of Police admitted that the assault had taken place and agreed to pay Kota R 120 000 in compensation.

== Role during 2015 xenophobia crisis ==
In October 2015 Grahamstown was wracked by serious xenophobic violence. Kota played a key role in grassroots work to oppose xenophobia.

== Death ==
Kota died of cancer on 22 February 2024, following which tributes to his work were made by many activists.

== Publications ==
Some of his published articles are:

- SA, we cannot say we are free, Ayanda Kota, Afro-Spear, 2011
- Malema does not speak for poor youths, Ayanda Kota, Mail & Guardian, 2011
- Secrecy Bill shows ANC's historic mission is over, Ayanda Kota, Mail & Guardian, December 2011
- ANC centenary a display of elite power, Ayanda Kota, Links, January 2012
- Time for radical action on the unemployment crisis, Ayanda Kota, Pambazuka, 17 May 2012
- Apartheid petty and grand, old and new is evil, Ayanda Kota, Pambazuka, 26 April 2012
- The Marikana mine workers massacre: a massive escalation in the war on the poor, Ayanda Kota, San Francisco Bay View, 18 August 2012
- Biko’s struggle goes on, Ayanda Kota, Grocott's Mail, 12 September 2013
- Don’t vote for these messiahs, Ayanda Kota, GroundUp, 2 April 2014
- In Memory of Comrade Nkosi Molala - Honorary President of the Black Consciousness Movement, Ayanda Kota, GroundUp, 22 September 2016
