= Marie Huchzermeyer =

Marie Huchzermeyer is an academic and public intellectual at the School of Architecture and Planning at the University of the Witwatersrand in Johannesburg, South Africa.

== Books ==
- Huchzermeyer, M., (2004). Unlawful Occupation: Informal Settlements and Urban Policy in South Africa and Brazil. Africa World Press/The Red Sea Press, Trenton New Jersey.
- Huchzermeyer, M., (2011). Tenement Cities: From 19th Century Berlin to 21st Century Nairobi. Africa World Press/The Red Sea Press, Trenton New Jersey.
- Huchzermeyer, M., (2011).Cities with ‘Slums’: From Informal Settlement Eradication to a Right To The City In Africa University of Cape Town Press, Cape Town

== Co-edited books ==
- Huchzermeyer, M. and Karam, A. (eds.) (2006) Informal Settlements – A Perpetual Challenge? Juta/UCT Press, Cape Town.
- Guest Editor of South African Review of Sociology (formerly Society in Transition), 37(1) 2006 Special Issue on ‘Informal Settlements and Access to Land’ (South African and international contributors).
- Harrison, P., Huchzermeyer, M., Mayekiso, M. (eds.) (2003). Confronting Fragmentation: Housing and Urban Development in a Democratising Society. UCT Press, Cape Town.

== Newspaper articles ==
- Ruling in Abahlali case lays solid foundation to build on, Business Day, 4 November 2009
- Listen to the Shack Dwellers, Mail & Guardian, June 2009 (with Kerry Chance and Mark Hunter)
- Reply to KZN Slums Act Judgment, Witness, March 2009
- Slums Law Based on Flawed Interpretation of UN Goals, Business Day, May 2008
- Uplift slums, don't destroy them, The Mercury, July 2007
- KZN Slum Elimination Bill: A Step Back, The Mercury, March 2007
- Elimination of the poor in KwaZulu Natal, March 2007
- Intuthuko vs Ufuduko: Yini umasipala weTheku ephoqa ukuthi imijondolo ukuba ifuduke?. Izwe Labampofu, January 2007
