= Peter Vale =

South African political scientist (1947-)

Peter Vale is a senior research fellow at the Centre for the Advancement of Scholarship at the University of Pretoria, South Africa, and the Nelson Mandela Professor of Politics Emeritus at Rhodes University, South Africa. He is also an honorary professor at the Africa Earth Observatory Network (AEON), Nelson Mandela University, of which he was a founding member. Vale enjoys professorships at the University of the Free State and the Federal University of Santa Maria in Brazil. Notably, he was the founding director of the Johannesburg Institute for Advanced Study (JIAS) and acting vice-rector for academic affairs and deputy vice-chancellor of the University of the Western Cape, South Africa. He has also received an honorary doctorate in the Humanities from the University of the Free State, South Africa.

== Early life and education ==
Born in Duiwelskloof (now Modjadjiskloof), he matriculated from Capricorn High School in 1965 and went on to read for a Bachelor of Arts and thereafter an honours degree in international relations at the University of the Witwatersrand (Wits), South Africa. Vale then completed his Master of Arts in comparative politics at Leicester University, United Kingdom, and took a PhD from the same institution in 1981.

== Career ==
Vale started his career as a financial journalist in 1971; whereafter, he moved into academia and served as the assistant director of the South African Institute of International Affairs (SAIIA). He then went on to work as a research fellow at the International Institute for Strategic Studies in the United Kingdom and, later, took up a lectureship in the Department of International Relations at Wits. In 1981 Vale returned to SAIIA as the director of research. In 1983, he was appointed as the director of the Institute for Social and Economic Research at Rhodes University and, later, the Centre for Southern African Studies at the University of the Western Cape (UWC) which he founded. Vale served as the acting vice-rector for academic affairs and deputy vice-chancellor at UWC between 1999 and 2001. He, thereafter, became a senior professor in the School of Government at UWC, before returning to Rhodes University as the Nelson Mandela Chair of Politics.

Vale chaired the Academy Advisory Board of the Stellenbosch Institute for Advanced Study (STIAS) between 2011 and 2016, and the ASSAf Standing Committee on the Humanities. Between 2008 and 2011, he co-chaired (with Jonathan Jansen) the first inquiry into the "state" of the Humanities in South Africa for the Academy of Science of South Africa (ASSAf). Among visiting appointments, he has been UNESCO Professor of African Studies at Utrecht University, the Netherlands; a Fellow at the International Centre for Advanced Studies, New York University; and professor of politics, Macquarie University, Sydney, Australia. Vale has been a visiting professor at the University of Bergen, Norway, too.

Vale has been honoured with the International Medal of the University of Utrecht and Rhodes University's Distinguished Senior Research Award. His 2003 book, Security and Politics in South Africa: The Regional Dimension, received the Vice-Chancellor's Book Award at Rhodes University. He is an elected member of the Academy of Science of South Africa (MASSAf), a Fellow of the Royal Society of South Africa (FRSSAf), Lid van Die Akademie vir Wetenskap en Kuns (LAkadSA), Fellow of the World Academy for Arts and Science (FWAAS) and a Fellow of the African Academy of Science (FAAS). In 2013, Vale delivered the E.H. Carr Memorial Lecture at Aberystwyth University, Wales, which is considered to be the most distinguished lecture in the field of International Relations. He is the recipient of the Lifetime Achievement Award by the Political Science Association of South Africa.

Recently, Vale was recently awarded the prestigious Marloth Memorial Medal by the Royal Society of South Africa. The citation reads:

"In a five-decade career, Vale has significantly contributed to Political Science, International Relations, Social Theory and African Studies. He has been one of the leading scholars on peoples-centred approaches to security, especially in Southern Africa. Vale was one of the early voices calling for decolonisation of International Relations, and his works on decolonisation have engineered a significant shift in disciplinary thinking. His contribution, however, reaches beyond ideas – he is a pioneer institution builder, the most recent of which is the Johannesburg Institute for Advanced Study."

Vale's research interests included social thought, intellectual traditions, the future and politics of higher education and the history of International Relations. He has published (and co-published) extensively - 30 books, pamphlets and the like, 85 academic chapters; 76 journal pieces and over 150 in grey literature or on the www. His journal work has appeared in Foreign Affairs, International Relations, International Affairs, International Politics, Millennium, African Sociological Review, Contemporary Politics, Global Society, The Round Table, Thesis Eleven, Arts and Humanities in Higher Education amongst other places.

A co-authored book (with Dr Vineet Thakur) on the South African origins of the field on International Relations was awarded the Francesco Guicciardini Prize for Best Book in Historical International Relations Section. His most recent co-edited book is State Capture in South Africa. How and why it happened with Mbongiseni Buthelezi.

Vale has been an energetic contributor to public debate in South Africa and elsewhere.

== Family ==
Peter Vale is married to the educationalist and activist Louise Carol Vale (born Kramer). The couple live in Schoenmakerskop, Eastern Cape, South Africa, and have two children.
