= S'bu Zikode =

South African activist

- Sibusiso Innocent Zikode
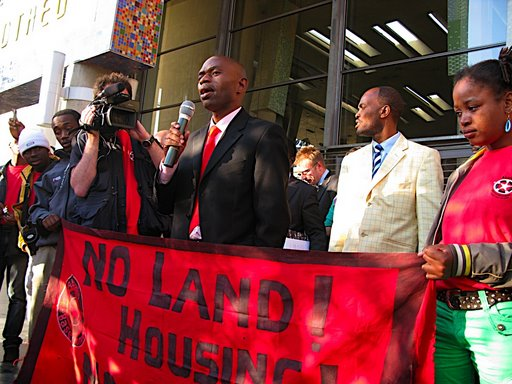
- S'bu Zikode at the Constitutional Court, Johannesburg, 14 May 2009
- Born: Sibusiso Innocent Zikode; 1975 (age 50–51); South Africa, Loskop
- Education: 1. Completed Matric at Bonokuhle High School where he joined the Boy Scouts Movement.; 2. University of Durban-Westville and is now part of the University of KwaZulu-Natal.
- Known for: Current president of the South African shack dwellers' movement Abahlali baseMjondolo.
- Notable work: On 16 December 2009 he was presented with the Order of the Holy Nativity by Bishop Rubin Phillip.

Sibusiso Innocent Zikode is the president of the South African shack dwellers' movement, which he co-founded with others in 2005. Abahlali baseMjondolo claims to have an audited paid up membership of over 115 000 across South Africa. His politics have been described as 'anti-capitalist'. According to the Mail & Guardian "Under his stewardship, ABM has made steady gains for housing rights."

== Biography ==
Zikode was born in the village of Loskop in 1975 and grew up in the town of Estcourt, in the midlands of KwaZulu Natal, South Africa. He was raised by a single mother working as a domestic worker. He completed Matric at Bonokuhle High School where he joined the Boy Scouts Movement.

A few years later he enrolled as a law student at what was formerly known as The University of Durban-Westville and is now part of the University of KwaZulu-Natal. However he was unable to pay fees or rent and in 1997 had to abandon his studies and move to the Kennedy Road shack settlement. He found work at a nearby petrol station as a pump attendant.

== Activism ==
Zikode has served a number of terms as the elected head of the South African shack dwellers' movement Abahlali baseMjondolo since October 2005. Before that he was the Chairperson of the Kennedy Road Development Committee. Although the movement campaigns for basic services, like water and electricity, as well as land and housing, Zikode is clear that its demands go beyond immediate material needs. He has said that ""The house on its own cannot solve the problem. It's not only money that creates dignity. All governments should accept that our communities are part of the greater society." He argues for an immediate assertion of equality and for meaningful engagement with the poor by saying that, "The government and academics speak about the poor all the time, but so few want to speak to the poor".

Commenting in response to Zikode's newspaper article 'We are the Third Force' veteran South African journalist Max du Preez commented that "I have never read anything as compelling, real and disturbing as the piece written in The Star last week by S'bu Zikode".

Academic Mark Hunter argues that Zikode evokes a conception of housing rooted in an idea of dignity rather than a technical, numbers driven approach to the housing crisis.

Zikode's writing has been anthologised in the Verso Book of Dissent and published in newspapers like The Guardian and Libération.

== Awards and recognition ==
On 16 December 2009, he was presented with the Order of the Holy Nativity by Bishop Rubin Phillip.

In 2012, the Mail & Guardian newspaper declared him to be one of the two hundred most important young South Africans.

In 2018, a new land occupation in Germiston in the East Rand, outside of Johannesburg, was named after Zikode.

In 2019, a new land occupation in Tembisa outside of Johannesburg was named after Zikode

On 25 March 2021, he was announced as the 2021 recipient of the Per Anger Prize, awarded by the Swedish government for humanitarian work and initiatives in the name of democracy.

== Repression ==
In February 2006, Zikode was prevented by the police from taking up an invitation to appear on a television talk show. In September 2006, Zikode, and the then Deputy Chair of the movement Philani Zungu, were arrested on trumped up charges and tortured by Superintendent Glen Nayager in the Sydenham Police Station.

In September 2009, Kennedy Road was attacked by a mob reportedly affiliated with the African National Congress. Violence continued for days. Zikode's home was destroyed during the violence and he and his family fled. Zikode, who went underground for some months because he feared for his life, considered himself a political refugee.

In its 2012, South Africa report Amnesty International reported that Zikode had been publicly threatened with violence by a senior ANC official.

In April 2013, Zikode, along with two others, successfully sued the Minister of Police for violence against his person.

In July 2018, following the assassination of a number of its members, Abahlali baseMjondolo issued a statement claiming that Zikode's life was "in grave danger". It was later reported that Zikode was living underground.

== Political commitments ==
Zikode supports building radical democracy from below and has called for 'a living communism'. He has stressed that land is fundamental to his politics. He is an advocate of land occupations. and supports the occupation of unused land. He is also an advocate of what he terms 'living politics', a form of politics that speaks directly to lived experience and is expressed in plain language.
