= KwaZulu-Natal Elimination and Prevention of Re-emergence of Slums Act, 2007 =

South African provincial law

KwaZulu-Natal Legislature
- Long title: Act to provide for the progressive elimination of slums in the Province of KwaZulu-Natal; to provide for measures for the prevention of the re-emergence of slums; to provide for the upgrading and control of existing slums; and to provide for matters connected therewith.
- Citation: Provincial Act No. 6 of 2007
- Territorial extent: KwaZulu-Natal
- Enacted by: KwaZulu-Natal Legislature
- Assented to: 18 July 2007
- Commenced: 2 August 2007

Repeals
- Section 16 invalidated in Abahlali baseMjondolo v Premier of KwaZulu-Natal
- Status: Struck down

The KwaZulu-Natal Elimination and Prevention of Re-emergence of Slums Act, 2007 (the "KZN Slums Act") was a provincial law dealing with land tenure and evictions in the province of KwaZulu-Natal in South Africa.

== The Act ==
The Slums Act was a highly controversial Act supported by the Provincial Government of KwaZulu-Natal as a response to housing conditions. Its stated purpose was to eliminate substandard housing conditions by giving the provincial Housing MEC authority to prescribe a time in which it would be compulsory for municipalities to evict unlawful occupiers of slums when landowners failed to do so. It also forced private landowners to evict shack dwellers. It was meant to be replicated in all other South African provinces.

The Act was widely criticised by civil society organisations and academics who said it was in conflict with the South African Constitution and PIE Act and who considered it to be repressive and anti-poor legislation.

== Constitutional Court of South Africa judgment ==
=== The road to the Constitutional Court ===
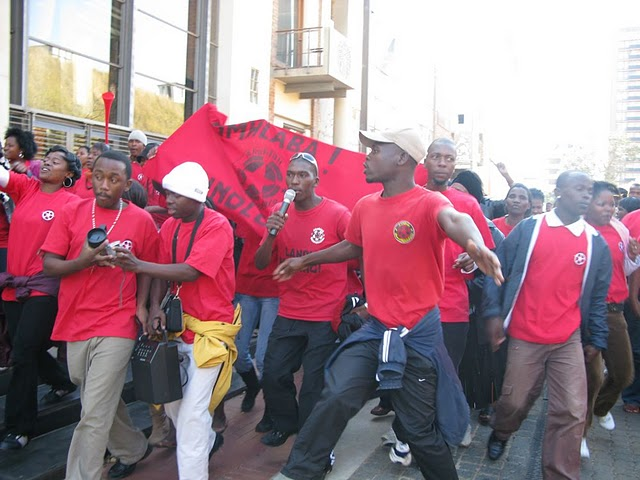
Abahlali baseMjondolo protest the Slums Act at the Constitutional Court

The squatters' movement Abahlali baseMjondolo took the government to court to have the Act declared unconstitutional. It lost in the KwaZulu-Natal High Court, Durban but then appealed directly to the Constitutional Court.

Abahlali baseMjondolo argued that the province was mandated to deal with housing rather than land tenure and that the act dealt with evictions and slum eradication rather than the provision of housing. They also argued that the act was vague and gave too much power to the provincial government that was in conflict with section 26 of the constitution that deals with housing and eviction rights.

=== The Act judged unconstitutional ===
On 14 October 2009, the South African Constitutional Court found the law to be in conflict with the Constitution and struck it down. Costs were awarded to Abahlali baseMjondolo. According to the judgement, the legislation would have allowed for the possibility of mass evictions without the possibility of suitable alternative accommodation and would have therefore violated the Prevention of Illegal Evictions Act (PIE Act) and South Africa's Constitution.

=== Intimidation and violence following the judgment ===
It was reported that following the judgment members of the movement were publicly threatened for their comments criticising the Slums Act. It has also been argued that the judgment was a key factor in the armed attack on Abahlali baseMjondolo in the Kennedy Road shack settlement in Durban in September 2009.

=== Significance of the judgment ===
The Slums Act is one of the best known judgments by the Constitutional Court in South Africa. It has been argued that after the judgment the state abandoned its plans to eradicate shack settlements by 2014.
