= Kennedy Road, Durban =

Informal settlement in KwaZulu-Natal, South Africa

Kennedy Road
- Location within KwaZulu-Natal Location within South Africa
- Coordinates: 29°48′41.37″S 30°58′46.71″E
- Country: South Africa
- Province: KwaZulu-Natal
- Municipality: eThekwini

Area
  - Total: 0.10 km^{2} (0.039 sq mi)

Population (2011)
  - Total: 5,455
  - Density: 55,000/km^{2} (140,000/sq mi)

Racial makeup of informal settlement (2011)
  - Black African: 99.76%
  - Coloured: 0.09%
  - Indian/Asian: 0.11%
  - White: 0.04%

First languages (2011)
  - Zulu: 66.23%
  - Xhosa: 26.18%
  - Sotho: 2.35%
  - English: 1.63%
  - Other: 3.60%
- Time zone: UTC+2 (SAST)

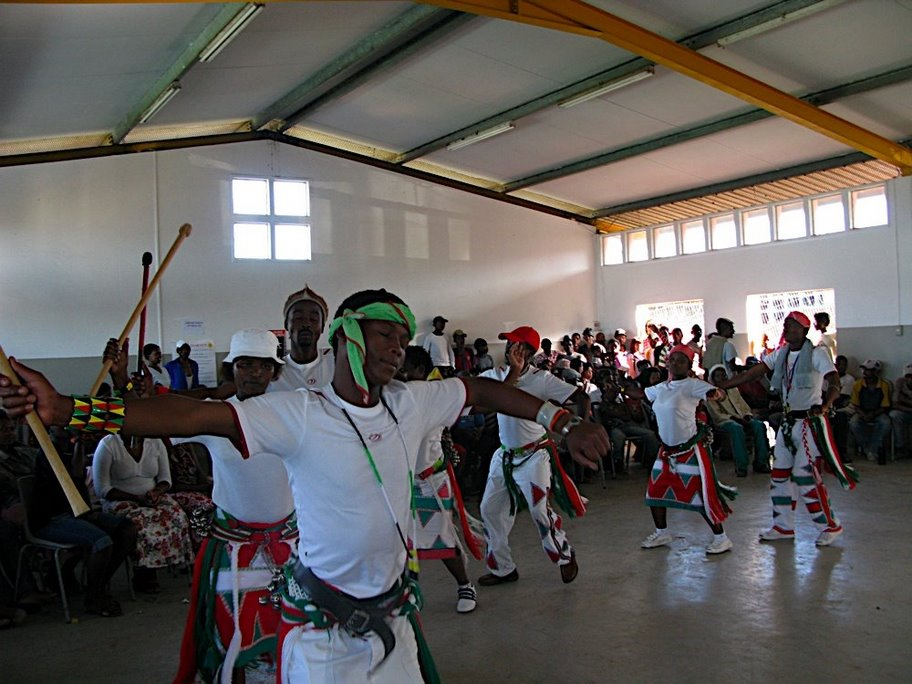
2008 dance festival at the settlement

Kennedy Road is an informal settlement in Durban (eThekwini), in the province of KwaZulu-Natal in South Africa. Formed in the late 1970s or early 1980s, the settlement was mentioned by the African National Congress (ANC) after the end of apartheid but amenities were not improved. The site is mostly not connected to sanitation or electricity. Dissatisfaction with local councillors led to 2005 protests including a road blockade, out of which the shack dwellers movement Abahlali baseMjondolo (AbM) formed. In 2009, an AbM meeting was attacked resulting in two deaths and a court case. More recently, the municipality has improved facilities and promised to relocate inhabitants.

== History ==
The Kennedy Road informal settlement is located on a steep hillside between a large rubbish dump and the Clare Estate, a suburb of Durban (eThekwini). Reports state that the site has been occupied since the late 1970s or early 1980s. Various attempts to force people off the land were met with resistance; by the late 1980s, the city had accepted the permanency of the settlement.

After the end of apartheid, the African National Congress (ANC) mentioned Kennedy Road by name as it pledged to improve informal settlements across the country. In the 1999 South African general election, inhabitants voted for the ANC. Most residents worked in the informal economy as cleaners or construction labourers. By the mid-2000s, there was a crumbling community hall and a self-managed creche, but the city had stopped emptying the latrines and only five were working on the entire site. The lack of decent roads meant that rubbish was rarely collected by the municipality and there were only five taps with running water. Around 40 percent of the site was connected to electricity, often illegally, which led to frequent shack fires.

By 2005, the Kennedy Road Development Committee (KRDC) was pressuring local councillors to improve living conditions and believed it had secured a promise from the director of housing of eThekwini Municipality of extra land. Aoibheann O'Sullivan, an Irish film-maker, produced the 16-minute documentary Kennedy Road and the Councillor that same year. It juxtaposed claims made by local councillor Yacoob Baig with responses from residents of Kennedy Road.

== 2005 road blockade ==
When Kennedy Road inhabitants saw that the land they had been promised was in fact being developed, they became angry. On 19 March 2005, around 800 people from the settlement blocked Umgeni Road and held it against the police for four hours, resulting in 14 arrests. Over a thousand people marched to the police station in Sydenham to demand the release of the "Kennedy Road 14". After 10 days, the arrestees were all released and permission was sought for a legal protest march, which occurred two weeks later on 13 May 2005. Over 3,000 people from Kennedy Road and other informal settlements marched to demand better amenities; this second march led to visits from city officials but no actual improvements. By September the latrines had been emptied but no new land was provided. Out of these protests, a city-wide movement of shack dwellers was formed known as Abahlali baseMjondolo (AbM). As of 2009, the settlement was home to approximately 7,000 people and S'bu Zikode, elected leader of AbM, lived in the settlement. The Dlamini King Brothers, an isicathamiya choir, also lived there until the 2009 attacks displaced them.

== September 2009 attack ==
On 26 September 2009, it was reported that a group of about 40 people wielding guns and knives attacked an Abahlali baseMjondolo youth meeting. The attackers demolished residents' homes and two people were killed in the resulting violence. The attacks continued through Tuesday 28 September 2009. It was reported by independent local and international academics as well as members of the AbM that the attackers were affiliated with the local branch of the ANC and that the attack was sanctioned by the local police.

The attacks garnered national and international condemnation. The Centre on Housing Rights and Evictions (COHRE) in Geneva issued a statement that expressed "grave concern about reports of organized intimidation and threats to members of advocacy group, Abahlali baseMjondolo". The police then arrested 12 members of AbM and put them on trial for offences ranging from murder to public violence, whilst Zikode and other AbM leaders went into hiding. The trial later collapsed. The Socio-Economic Rights Institute of South Africa said that the "charges were based on evidence which now appears almost certainly to have been manufactured". Sociologist Marie Huchzermeyer has argued that the attack on Abahlali baseMjondolo at the Kennedy Road settlement was linked to the movement's successful challenge to the so-called 'Slums Act' in the Constitutional Court.

== Recent events ==
In 2020, as part of its response to the COVID-19 pandemic in South Africa, eThekwini Municipality planned to relocate inhabitants of Kennedy Road to alleviate overcrowding. In 2021, the municipality claimed it had been unable to aid recent victims of shack fires because workers had been attacked. It assessed that 483 shacks had been destroyed, displacing 781 people, including 135 children. Survivors of the fire told how difficult it was for them having lost possessions such as identification papers and birth certificates.
