= Family farm =

Farm owned or operated by a family

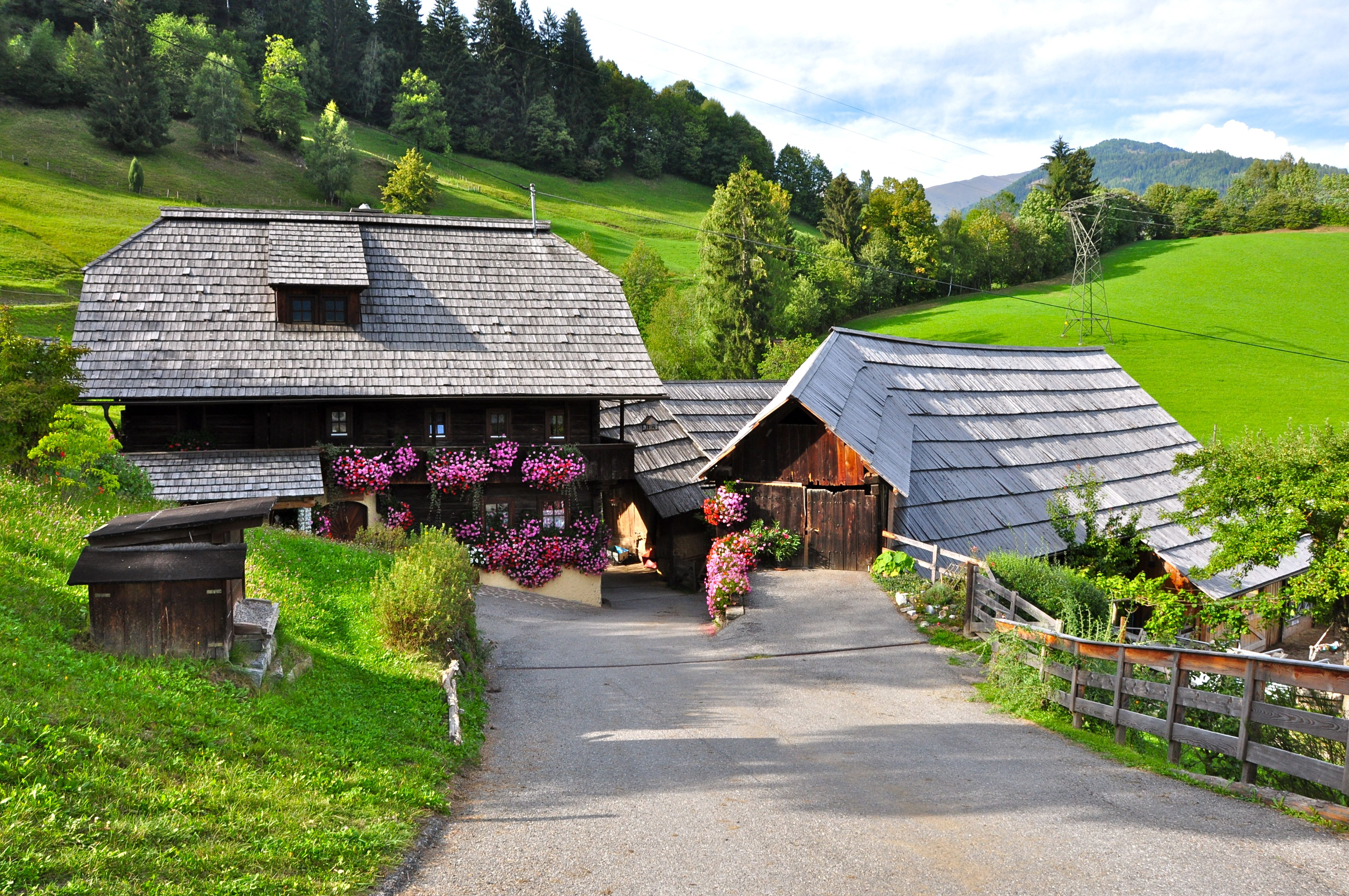
Historical farming estate Stoffl in Radenthein, Carinthia, with an 18th-century arrangement of a main building, a granary and two buildings used as stables and barns

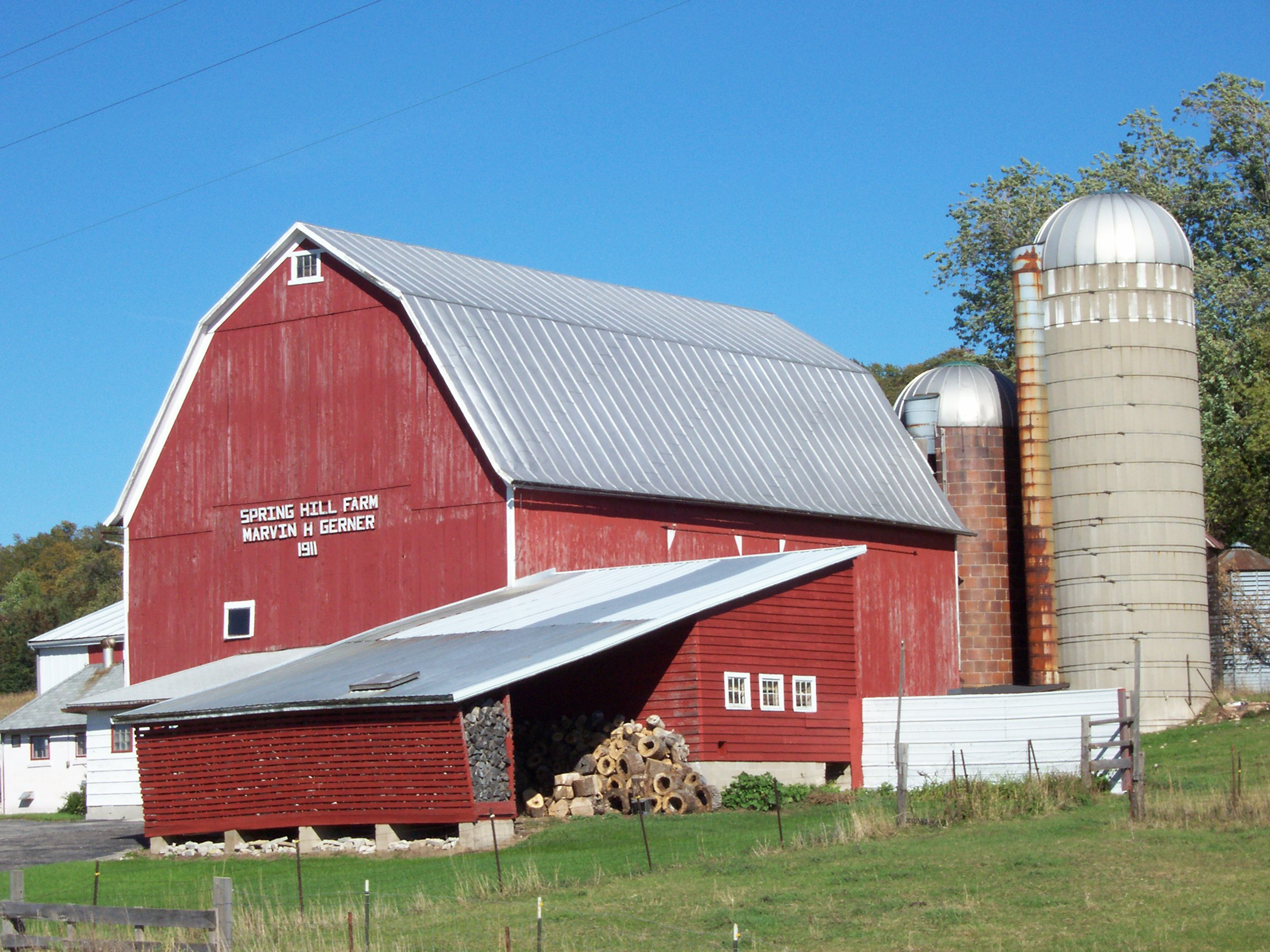
Barn of a Wisconsin family farm, inscribed with the foundational year (1911)

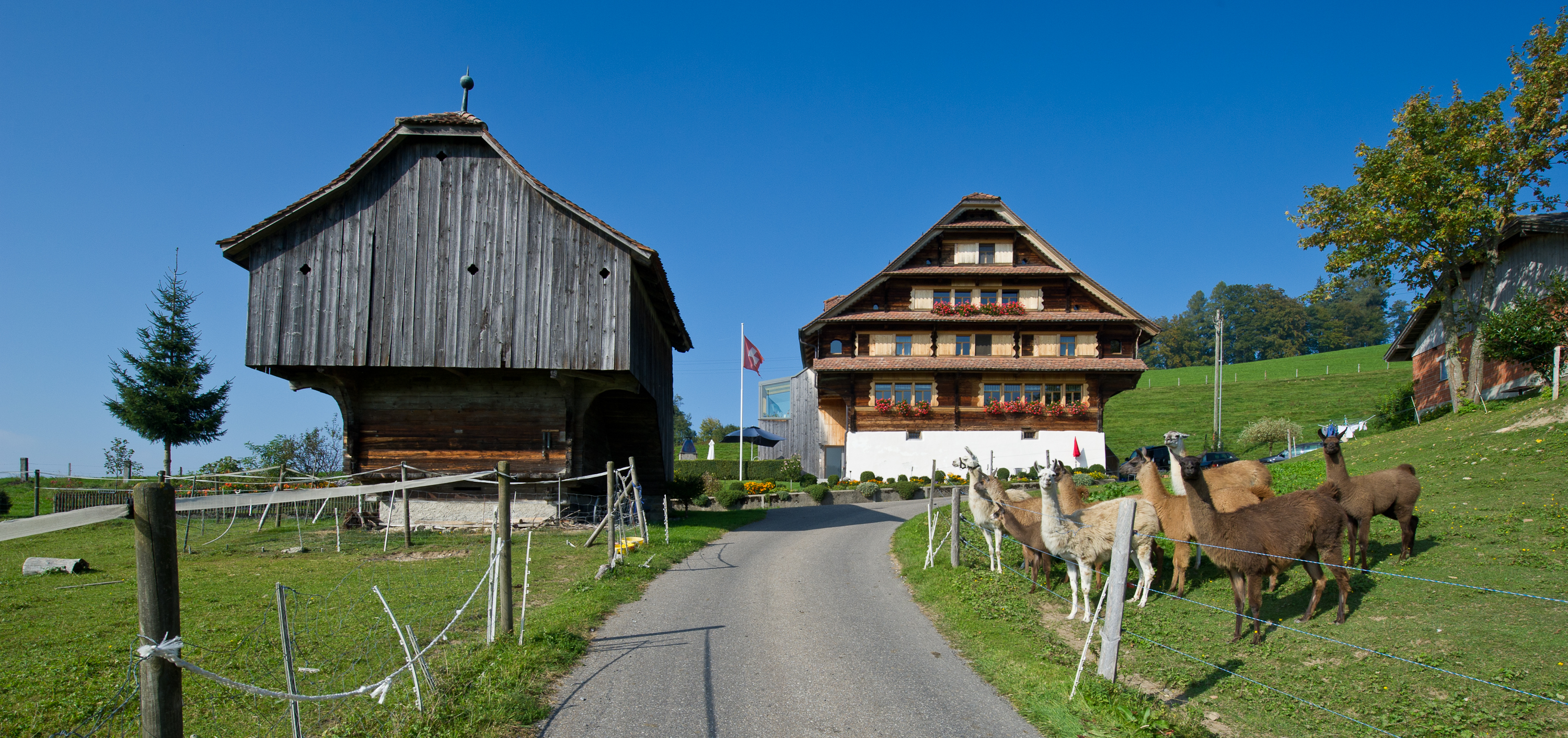
The Scharmoos estate in Schwarzenberg in the Swiss canton of Lucerne, owned by the Schofer family during c. 1670–1918

A family farm is generally understood to be a farm owned and/or operated by a family. It is sometimes considered to be an estate passed down by inheritance.

Although a recurring conceptual and archetypal distinction is that of a family farm as a smallholding versus corporate farming as large-scale agribusiness, that notion does not accurately describe the realities of farm ownership in many countries. Family farm businesses can take many forms, from smallholder farms to larger farms operated under intensive farming practices. In various countries, most farm families have structured their farm businesses as corporations (such as limited liability companies) or trusts, for liability, tax, and business purposes. Thus, the idea of a family farm as a unitary concept or definition does not easily translate across languages, cultures, or centuries, as there are substantial differences in agricultural traditions and histories between countries and between centuries within a country. For example, in U.S. agriculture, a family farm can be of any size, as long as the ownership is held within a family. A 2014 USDA report shows that family farms operate 90 percent of the nation's farmland, and account for 85 percent of the country's agricultural production value. However, that does not at all imply that corporate farming is a small presence in U.S. agriculture; rather, it simply reflects the fact that many corporations are closely held. In contrast, in Brazilian agriculture, the official definition of a family farm (agricultura familiar) is limited to small farms worked primarily by members of a single family; but again, this fact does not imply that corporate farming is a small presence in Brazilian agriculture; rather, it simply reflects the fact that large farms with many workers cannot be legally classified under the family farm label because that label is legally reserved for smallholdings in that country.

Farms that would not be considered family farms would be those operated as collectives, non-family corporations, or in other institutionalised forms. At least 500 million of the world's [estimated] 570 million farms are managed by families, making family farms predominant in global agriculture.

== Definitions ==
An "informal discussion of the concepts and definitions" in a working paper published by Food and Agriculture Organization of the United Nations in 2014 reviewed English, Spanish and French definitions of the concept of "family farm". Definitions referred to one or more of labor, management, size, provision of family livelihood, residence, family ties and generational aspects, community and social networks, subsistence orientation, patrimony, land ownership and family investment. The disparity of definitions reflects national and geographical differences in cultures, rural land tenure, and rural economies, as well as the different purposes for which definitions are coined.

The 2012 United States Census of Agriculture defines a family farm as "any farm where the majority of the business is owned by the operator and individuals related to the operator, including relatives who do not live in the operator’s household"; it defines a farm as "any place from which $1,000 or more of agricultural products were produced and sold, or normally would have been sold, during a given year."

The Food and Agriculture Organization of the United Nations defines a "family farm" as one that relies primarily on family members for labour and management.

In some usages, "family farm" implies that the farm remains within the ownership of a family over a number of generations.

Being special-purpose definitions, the definitions found in laws or regulations may differ substantially from commonly understood meanings of "family farm". For example, In the United States, under federal Farm Ownership loan regulations, the definition of a "family farm" does not specify the nature of farm ownership, and management of the farm is either by the borrower, or by members operating the farm when a loan is made to a corporation, co-operative or other entity. The complete definition can be found in the US Code of Federal Regulations 7 CFR 1943.4.

== History ==
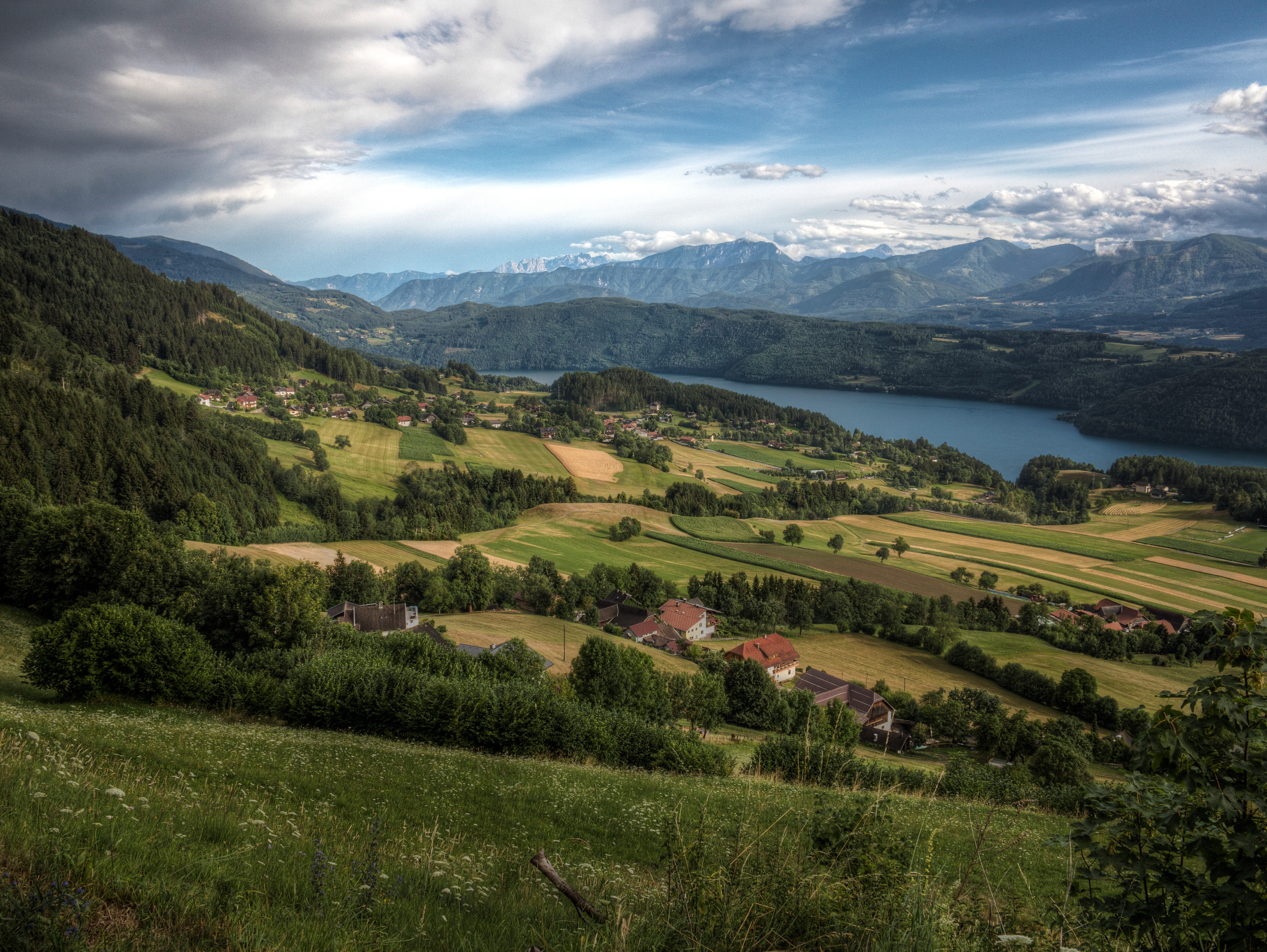
Dispersed settlement landscape in Carinthia

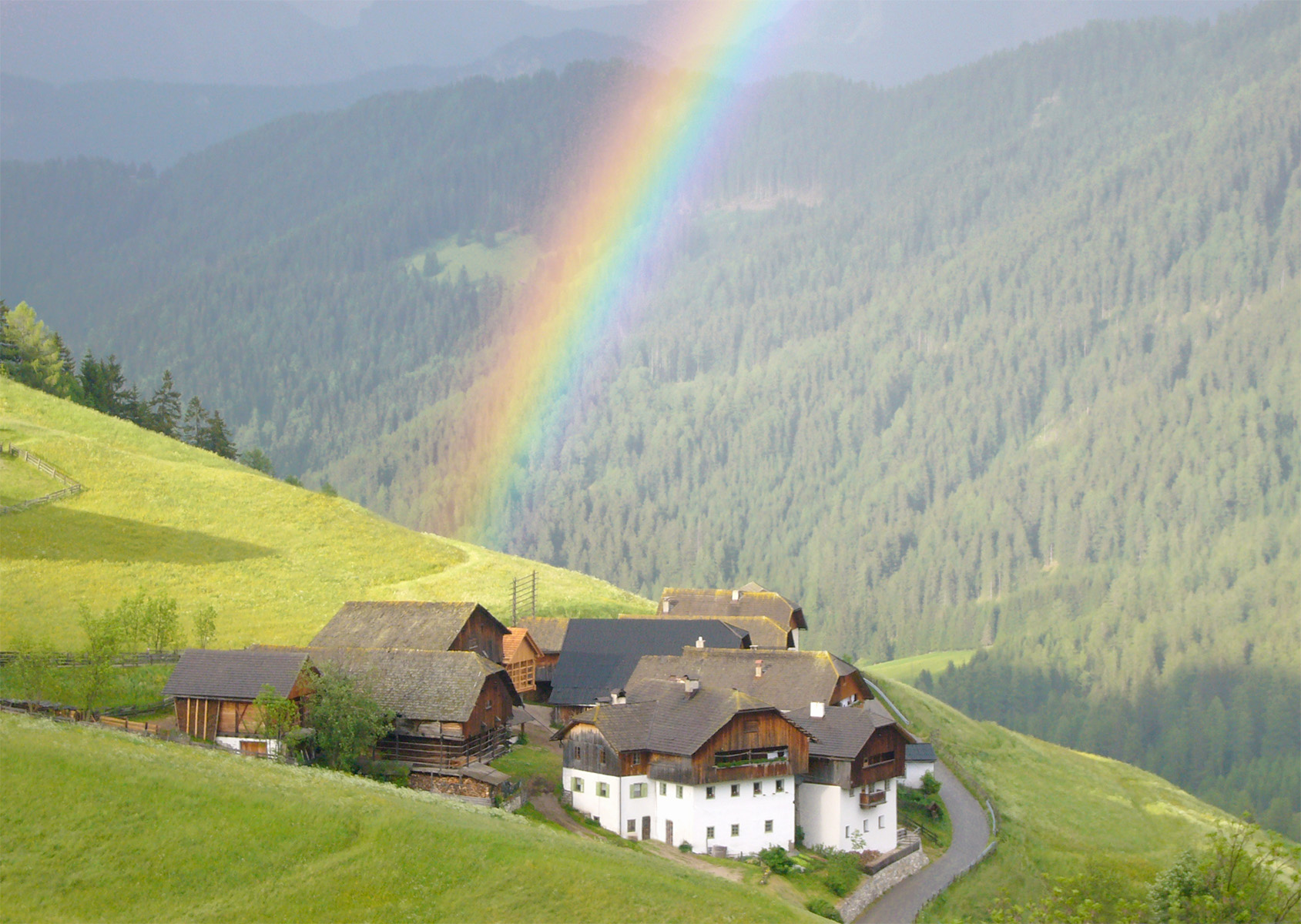
Mountain farms in South Tyrol

In the Roman Republic, latifundia, great landed estates, specialised in agriculture destined for export, producing grain, olive oil, or wine, corresponding largely to modern industrialized agriculture but depending on slave labour instead of mechanization, developed after the Second Punic War and increasingly replaced the former system of family-owned small or intermediate farms in the Roman Empire period. The basis of the latifundia in Spain and Sicily was the ager publicus that fell to the dispensation of the state through Rome's policy of war in the 1st century BC and the 1st century AD.

In the collapse of the Western Roman Empire, the largely self-sufficient villa-system of the latifundia remained among the few political-cultural centres of a fragmented Europe. These latifundia had been of great importance economically, until the long-distance shipping of wine and oil, grain and garum disintegrated, but extensive lands controlled in a single pair of hands still constituted power: it can be argued that the latifundia formed part of the economic basis of the European social feudal system, taking the form of Manorialism, the essential element of feudal society, and the organizing principle of rural economy in medieval Europe. Manorialism was characterised by the vesting of legal and economic power in a Lord of the manor, supported economically from his own direct landholding in a manor (sometimes called a fief), and from the obligatory contributions of a legally subject part of the peasant population under the jurisdiction of himself and his manorial court. Manorialism died slowly and piecemeal, along with its most vivid feature in the landscape, the open field system. It outlasted serfdom as it outlasted feudalism: "primarily an economic organization, it could maintain a warrior, but it could equally well maintain a capitalist landlord. It could be self-sufficient, yield produce for the market, or it could yield a money rent." The last feudal dues in France were abolished at the French Revolution. In parts of eastern Germany, the Rittergut manors of Junkers remained until World War II. The common law of the leasehold estate relation evolved in medieval England. That law still retains many archaic terms and principles pertinent to a feudal social order. Under the tenant system, a farm may be worked by the same family over many generations, but what is inherited is not the farm's estate itself but the lease on the estate. In much of Europe, serfdom was abolished only in the modern period, in Western Europe after the French Revolution, in Russia as late as in 1861.

In contrast to the Roman system of latifundia and the derived system of manoralism, the Germanic peoples had a system based on heritable estates owned by individual families or clans. The Germanic term for "heritable estate, allodium" was *ōþalan (Old English ēþel), which incidentally was also used as a rune name; the gnomic verse on this term in the Anglo-Saxon rune poem reads:

[Ēðel] byþ oferleof æghwylcum men, gif he mot ðær rihtes and gerysena on brucan on bolde bleadum oftast.
"[An estate] is very dear to every man, if he can enjoy there in his house whatever is right and proper in constant prosperity."

In the inheritance system known as Salic patrimony (also gavelkind in its exceptional survival in medieval Kent) refers to this clan-based possession of real estate property, particularly in Germanic context. Terra salica could not be sold or otherwise disposed; it was not alienable. Much of Germanic Europe has a history of overlap or conflict between the feudal system of manoralism, where the estate is owned by noblemen and leased to the tenants or worked by serfs, and the Germanic system of free farmers working landed estates heritable within their clan or family. Historical prevalence of the Germanic system of independent estates or Höfe resulted in dispersed settlement (Streusiedlung) structure, as opposed to the village-centered settlements of manoralism.

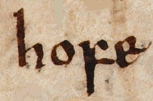
Mention of "hofe" in Beowulf

In German-speaking Europe, a farmyard is known as a Hof; in modern German this word designates the area enclosed by the farm buildings, not the fields around them, and it is also used in other everyday situations for courtyards of any type (Hinterhof = 'back yard', etc.). The recharacterized compound Bauernhof was formed in the early modern period to designate family farming estates and today is the most common word for 'farm', while the archaic Meierhof designated a manorial estate. Historically, the unmarked term Hof was increasingly used for the royal or noble court. The estate as a whole is referred to by the collective Gehöft (15th century); the corresponding Slavic concept being Khutor. Höfeordnung is the German legal term for the inheritance laws regarding family farms, deriving from inheritance under medieval Saxon law. In England, the title of yeoman was applied to such land-owning commoners from the 15th century.

In the early modern and modern period, the dissolution of manoralism went parallel to the development of intensive farming parallel to the Industrial Revolution. Mechanization enabled the cultivation of much larger areas than what was typical for the traditional estates aimed at subsistence farming, resulting in the emergence of a smaller number of large farms, with the displaced population partly contributing to the new class of industrial wage-labourers and partly emigrating to the New World or the Russian Empire (following the 1861 emancipation of the serfs). The family farms established in Imperial Russia were again collectivized under the Soviet Union, but the emigration of European farmers displaced by the Industrial Revolution contributed to the emergence of a system of family estates in the Americas (Homestead Act of 1862).

Thomas Jefferson's argument that a large number of family estates are a factor in ensuring the stability of democracy was repeatedly used in support of subsidies.

== Developed world ==
=== Perceptions of the family farm ===
In developed countries the family farm is viewed sentimentally, as a lifestyle to be preserved for tradition's sake, or as a birthright. It is in these nations very often a political rallying cry against change in agricultural policy, most commonly in Australia, Canada, Denmark, France, Germany, Ireland, Japan, New Zealand, Korea, United Kingdom, and the United States, where rural lifestyles are often regarded as desirable. In these countries, strange bedfellows can often be found arguing for similar measures despite otherwise vast differences in political ideology. For example, Pat Buchanan and Ralph Nader, both candidates for the office of President of the United States, held rural rallies together and spoke for measures to preserve the so-called family farm. On other economic matters they were seen as generally opposed, but found common ground on this one.

The social roles of family farms are much changed today. Until recently, staying in line with traditional and conservative sociology, the heads of the household were usually the oldest man followed closely by his oldest sons. The wife generally took care of the housework, child rearing, and financial matters pertaining to the farm. However, agricultural activities have taken on many forms and change over time. Agronomy, horticulture, aquaculture, silviculture, and apiculture, along with traditional plants and animals, all make up aspects of today's family farm. Farm wives often need to find work away from the farm to supplement farm income and children sometimes have no interest in farming as their chosen field of work.

Bolder promoters argue that as agriculture has become more efficient with the application of modern management and new technologies in each generation, the idealized classic family farm is now simply obsolete, or more often, unable to compete without the economies of scale available to larger and more modern farms. Advocates argue that family farms in all nations need to be protected, as the basis of rural society and social stability.

=== Viability ===
According to the United States Department of Agriculture, ninety-eight percent of all farms in the U.S. are family farms. Two percent of farms are not family farms, and those two percent make up fourteen percent of total agricultural output in the United States, although half of them have total sales of less than $50,000 per year. Overall, ninety-one percent of farms in the United States are considered "small family farms" (with sales of less than $250,000 per year), and those farms produce twenty-seven percent of U.S. agricultural output.

Depending on the type and size of independently owned operation, some limiting factors are:

- Economies of scale: Larger farms are able to bargain more competitively, purchase more competitively, profit from economic highs, and weather lows more readily through monetary inertia than smaller farms.
- Cost of inputs: fertilizer and other agrichemicals can fluctuate dramatically from season to season, partially based on oil prices, a range of 25% to 200% is common over a period of a few years.
- oil prices: Directly (for farm machinery) and somewhat less directly (long-distance transport; production cost of agrichemicals), the cost of oil significantly impacts the year-to-year viability of all mechanized conventional farms.
- commodity futures: the predicted price of agricultural crops, hogs, grain, etc., can determine ahead of a season what seems economically viable to grow.
- technology user agreements: a less publicly known factor, patented GE seed that is widely used for many crops, like cotton and soy, comes with restrictions on use, which can even include who the crop can be sold to.
- wholesale infrastructure: A farmer growing larger quantities of a crop than can be sold directly to consumers has to meet a range of criteria for sale into the wholesale market, which include harvest timing and graded quality, and may also include variety, therefore, the market channel really determines most aspects of the farm decisionmaking.
- availability of financing: Larger farms today often rely on lines of credit, typically from banks, to purchase the agrichemicals, and other supplies needed for each growing year. These lines are heavily affected by almost all of the other constraining factors.
- government economic intervention: In some countries, notably the US and EU, government subsidies to farmers, intended to mitigate the impact on domestic farmers of economic and political activities in other areas of the economy, can be a significant source of farm income. Bailouts, when crises such as drought or the "mad cow disease" problems hit agricultural sectors, are also relied on. To some large degree, this situation is a result of the large-scale global markets farms have no alternative but to participate in.
- government and industry regulation: A wide range of quotas, marketing boards and legislation governing agriculture impose complicated limits, and often require significant resources to navigate. For example, on the small farming end, in many jurisdictions, there are severe limits or prohibitions on the sale of livestock, dairy and eggs. These have arisen from pressures from all sides: food safety, environmental, industry marketing.
- real estate prices: The growth of urban centers around the world, and the resulting urban sprawl have caused the price of centrally located farmland to skyrocket, while reducing the local infrastructure necessary to support farming, putting effectively intense pressure on many farmers to sell out.

Over the 20th century, these challenges have encouraged individual farmers of developed nations to opt for successive waves of new technology, ("trading in their horses for a tractor"), increasing their debt and their production capacity. These choices can only be supported by selling at larger and more distant markets, and by shouldering heavier and more complex financing. The availability of an increasingly diverse supply of fresh produce and meat in all seasons of the year enables consumers to enjoy a healthier, fresh-ingredient diet. However, these changes in farming practices also made available an unprecedented variety of processed foods, such as corn syrup and bleached flour. For the family farm this increasingly complex marketplace has presented new and unprecedented challenges, and not all family farmers have been able to effectively cope with the changing market conditions.

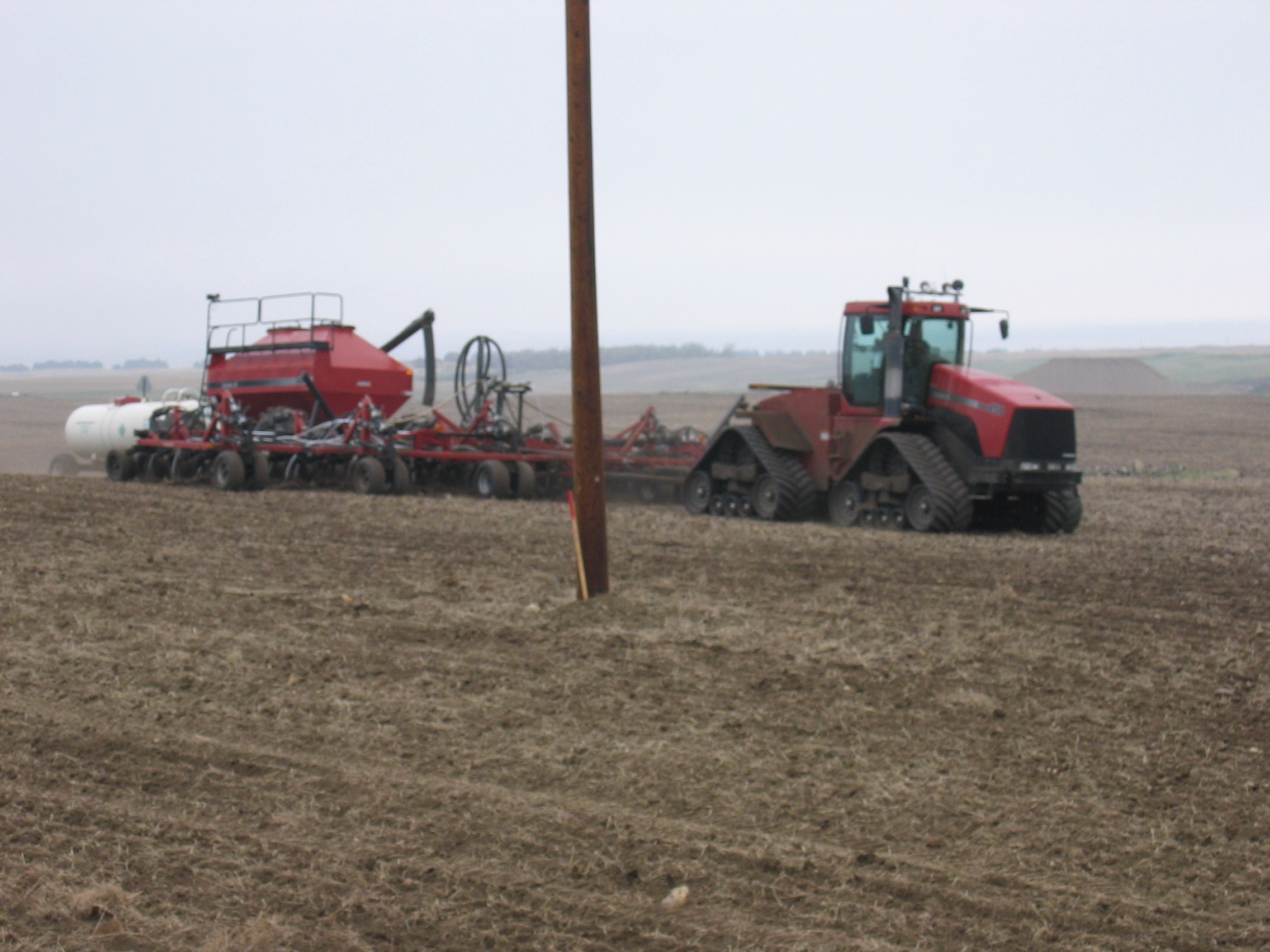
Intensive wheat farming in western North Dakota

=== Local food and the organic movement ===
In the last few decades there has been a resurgence of interest in organic and free range foods. A percentage of consumers have begun to question the viability of industrial agriculture practices and have turned to organic groceries that sell products produced on family farms including not only meat and produce but also such things as wheat germ breads and natural lye soaps (as opposed to bleached white breads and petroleum based detergent bars). Others buy these products direct from family farms. The "new family farm" provides an alternative market in some localities with an array of traditionally and naturally produced products.

Such "organic" and "free-range" farming is attainable where a significant number of affluent urban and suburban consumers willingly pay a premium for the ideals of "locally produced produce" and "humane treatment of animals". Sometimes, these farms are hobby or part-time ventures, or supported by wealth from other sources. Viable farms on a scale sufficient to support modern families at an income level commensurate with urban and suburban upper-middle-class families are often large scale operations, both in area and capital requirements. These farms, family owned and operated in a technologically and economically conventional manner, produce crops and animal products oriented to national and international markets, rather than to local markets. In assessing this complex economic situation, it is important to consider all sources of income available to these farms; for instance, the millions of dollars in farm subsidies which the United States government offers each year. As fuel prices rise, foods shipped to national and international markets are already rising in price.

=== United States ===
In 2012, the United States had 2,039,093 family farms (as defined by USDA), accounting for 97 percent of all farms and 89 percent of census farm area in the United States. In 1988 Mark Friedberger warned, "The farm family is a unique institution, perhaps the last remnant, in an increasingly complex world, of a simpler social order in which economic and domestic activities were inextricably bound together. In the past few years, however, American agriculture has suffered huge losses, and family farmers have seen their way of life threatened by economic forces beyond their control." However, by 1981 Ingolf Vogeler argued it was too late—the American family farm had been replaced by large agribusiness corporations pretending to be family operated.

A USDA survey conducted in 2011 estimated that family farms account for 85 percent of US farm production and 85 percent of US gross farm income. Mid-size and larger family farms account for 60 percent of US farm production and dominate US production of cotton, cash grain and hogs. Small family farms account for 26 percent of US farm production overall, and higher percentages of production of poultry, beef cattle, some other livestock and hay.

Several kinds of US family farms are recognized in USDA farm typology:

Small family farms are defined as those with annual gross cash farm income (GCFI) of less than $350,000; in 2011, these accounted for 90 percent of all US farms. Because low net farm incomes tend to predominate on such farms, most farm families on small family farms are extremely dependent on off-farm income. Small family farms in which the principal operator was mostly employed off-farm accounted for 42 percent of all farms and 15 percent of total US farm area; median net farm income was $788. Retirement family farms were small farms accounting for 16 percent of all farms and 7 percent of total US farm area; median net farm income was $5,002.

The other small family farm categories are those in which farming occupies at least 50 percent of the principal operator's working time. These are:

Low-sales small family farms (with GCFI less than $150,000); 26 percent of all US farms, 18 percent of total US farm area, median net farm income $3,579.

Moderate-sales small family farms (with GCFI of $150,000 to $349,999); 5.44 percent of all US farms, 13 percent of total US farm area, median net farm income $67,986.

Mid-size family farms (GCFI of $350,000 to $999,999); 6 percent of all US farms, 22 percent of total US farm area; median net farm income $154,538.

Large family farms (GCFI $1,000,000 to $4,999,999); 2 percent of all US farms, 14 percent of total US farm area; median net farm income $476,234.

Very large family farms (GCFI over $5,000,000); <1 percent of all US farms, 2 percent of total US farm area; median net farm income $1,910,454.

Family farms include not only sole proprietorships and family partnerships, but also family corporations. Family-owned corporations account for 5 percent of all farms and 89 percent of corporate farms in the United States. About 98 percent of US family corporations owning farms are small, with no more than 10 shareholders; average net farm income of family corporate farms was $189,400 in 2012. (In contrast, 90 percent of US non-family corporations owning farms are small, having no more than 10 shareholders; average net cash farm income for US non-family corporate farms was $270,670 in 2012.)

=== Canada ===
In Canada, the number of "family farms" cannot be inferred closely, because of the nature of census data, which do not distinguish family and non-family farm partnerships. In 2011, of Canada's 205,730 farms, 55 percent were sole proprietorships, 25 percent were partnerships, 17 percent were family corporations, 2 percent were non-family corporations and <1 percent were other categories. Because some but not all partnerships involve family members, these data suggest that family farms account for between about 73 and 97 percent of Canadian farms. The family farm percentage is likely to be near the high end of this range, for two reasons. The partners in a [Canadian] farm partnership are typically spouses, often forming the farm partnership for tax reasons. Also, as in the US, family farm succession planning can use a partnership as a means of apportioning family farm tenure among family members when a sole proprietor is ready to transfer some or all of ownership and operation of a farm to offspring. Conversion of a sole proprietorship family farm to a family corporation may also be influenced by legal and financial, e.g. tax, considerations. The Canadian Encyclopedia estimates that more than 90 percent of Canadian farms are family operations. In 2006, of Canadian farms with more than one million dollars in annual gross farm receipts, about 63 percent were family corporations and 13 percent were non-family corporations.

=== Europe ===
Analysis of data for 59,000 farms in the 12 member states of the European Community found that in 1989, about three-quarters of the farms were family farms, producing just over half of total agricultural output.

As of 2010, there were approximately 139,900 family farms in Ireland, with an average size of 35.7 hectares per holding. (Nearly all farms in Ireland are family farms.) In Ireland, average family farm income was 25,483 euros in 2012. Analysis by Teagasc (Ireland's Agriculture and Food Development Authority) estimates that 37 percent of Irish farms are economically viable and an additional 30 percent are sustainable due to income from off-farm sources; 33 percent meet neither criterion and are considered economically vulnerable.

== Newly industrialized countries ==
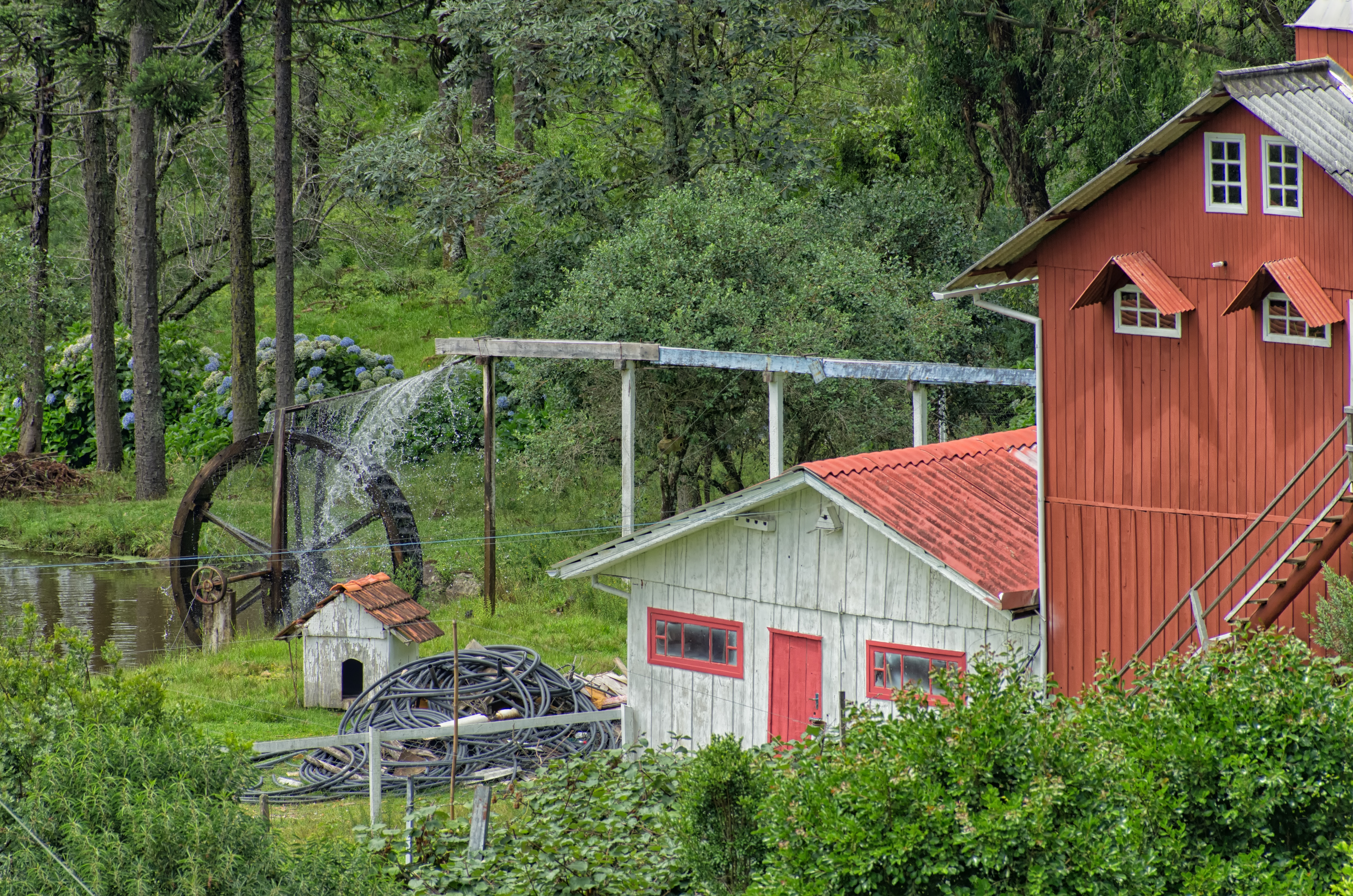
A family farm in Urubici, Santa Catarina State in Brazil

In Brazil, there are about 4.37 million family farms. These account for 84.4 percent of farms, 24.3 percent of farmland area and 37.5 percent of the value of agricultural production.

== Developing countries ==
In sub-Saharan Africa, 80% of the farms were family owned and worked by 2014.

Sub-Saharan agriculture was mostly defined by slash-and-burn subsistence farming, historically spread by the Bantu expansion. Permanent farming estates were established during colonialism, in the 19th to 20th century. After decolonisation, white farmers in some African countries have tended to be attacked, killed or evicted, notably in South Africa and Zimbabwe.

In southern Africa, "On peasant family farms ..., cash input costs are very low, non‐household labour is sourced largely from communal work groups through kinship ties, and support services needed to sustain production are minimal." On commercial family farms, "cash input costs are high, little non‐family labour is used and strong support services are necessary."

== International Year of Family Farming ==
Logo of International Year of Family Farming 2014

At the 66th session of the United Nations General Assembly, 2014 was formally declared to be the "International Year of Family Farming" (IYFF). The Food and Agriculture Organization of the United Nations was invited to facilitate its implementation, in collaboration with Governments, International Development Agencies, farmers' organizations and other relevant organizations of the United Nations system as well as relevant non-governmental organizations.

The goal of the 2014 IYFF is to reposition family farming at the centre of agricultural, environmental and social policies in the national agendas by identifying gaps and opportunities to promote a shift towards a more equal and balanced development. The 2014 IYFF will promote broad discussion and cooperation at the national, regional and global levels to increase awareness and understanding of the challenges faced by smallholders and help identify efficient ways to support family farmers.

== See also ==
- Agricola (board game)
- Agricultural policy
- Agroecological restoration
- Back-to-the-land movement
- Dairy industry in the United Kingdom
- Dairy industry in the United States
- Family farm hog pen
- Farm Aid
- Gentleman's farm
- Hobby farm
- Local food
- Peasant movement
- United Nations Decade of Family Farming
- United Nations Declaration on the Rights of Peasants
- Via Campesina
