= Guy Kastler =

French farmers and peasants rights advocate

- Occupations: Philosopher, peasant
- Years active: 1971–present
- Known for: Farmers rights, Seed movement, Organic farming

Guy Kastler is a French peasant farmer, philosopher, activist for the rights of farmers and peasants, and documentary director. He is a representative of the European chapter of la Via Campesina and at French Réseau semences paysannes.

== Background ==
Guy Kastler studied philosophy until the year 1970, when he started engaging in rural work as a farm laborer, a winemaker, and an herdsman and cheesemaker in Southern France's Hérault. He engaged in practices of organic farming, and has been advocating for organic farming, fair and equitable access and benefit sharing, farmers' rights and various peasant movements.

Guy Kastler is the representative of various social movements:

- Confederation of French Farmers (Confédération paysanne) on issues related to seeds and GMOs;
- French Farmers' Seed Network (Réseau semences paysannes), founding member, representative between 2003 and 2015;
- Via Campesina International, member of the biodiversity commission and representative for Europe;
- Nature & Progrès, member since 1971.

He has taken part in international fora, such as the UN Food and Agriculture Organization, the World Intellectual Property Organization, the UPOV Convention on New Varieties of Plants and the UN Human Rights Council. He has also taken part in several TV documentaries (Le monde en face; La guerre des graines; Severn, la voix de nos enfants).

== See also ==
- Environmental movement
- Peasant movement
- Via Campesina
- UN Declaration on the Rights of Peasants
- Elizabeth Mpofu
- José Bové
