= Elizabeth Mpofu =

Zimbabwean farmer, writer and activist

- Born: 1959 (age 66–67); Zimbabwe
- Citizenship: Zimbabwean
- Occupations: Organic farmer; activist; writer
- Employer: La Via Campesina
- Organizations: La Via Campesina; ZIMSOFF; Association of Zimbabwe Traditional Environmental Conservationists
- Known for: Peasant rights advocacy; leadership in La Via Campesina
- Title: General Coordinator of La Via Campesina
- Children: 3

Elizabeth Mpofu (born 1959) is a small-scale organic farmer, writer and activist based in Zimbabwe. She is General Coordinator of Via Campesina and in 2016 was Special Ambassador to the Food and Agriculture Organization of the United Nations (FAO) for the International Year of Pulses. She is also founder and chairperson of ZIMSOFF (Zimbabwe Smallholder Organic Farmers Forum).

== Early life ==
Elizabeth Mpofu was born in 1959. She has three children and nine grandchildren.

Mpofu is a small-scale organic farmer based in Masvingo Province in Zimbabwe. She has her 10 hectare farm as a result of a land reform programme begun in 2000. She grows maize, legumes and other beans.

== Activism ==
Mpofu became a member of the Association of Zimbabwe Traditional Environmental Conservationists in 1982. She later became a founding member and then chairperson of ZIMSOFF (Zimbabwe Smallholder Organic Farmers Forum). In 2016, she was appointed Special Ambassador to the Food and Agriculture Organization of the United Nations (FAO) for the International Year of Pulses.

Mpofu is currently (2020) General Coordinator of Via Campesina, a global organisation representing the rights of 200 million peasants. Mpofu became coordinator in 2013 and campaigns on issues such as gaining access to land and eradicating violence against women.

The United Nations Human Rights Council passed the UN Declaration on the Rights of Peasants and Other People Working in Rural Areas in 2018, following a proposal first made by Via Campesina in 2008. Mpofu commented "This has been a long tough path but as peasants, as people who have seen the worst of poverty and neglect, we are tough too and we never give up". The declaration was then approved by the United Nations General Assembly later in the year.

== Selected works ==
- Elizabeth Mpofu (2016) 'Women farm through knowledge sharing' in Farming Matters.
- Elizabeth Mpofu & Ndabezinhle Nyoni (2017) 'Role of pulses and smallholders in the transformation of Africa's agriculture' in Nature & Faune.

== See also ==
=== Internal links ===
- Via Campesina
- United Nations Declaration on the Rights of Peasants
- Guy Kastler
- José Bové
- Environmental movement
- Peasant movement
