= Land (disambiguation) =

Land is the solid surface of the Earth that is not covered by water.

Land, lands, The Land, or the Lands may also refer to:

== Entertainment and media ==
=== Film ===
- Land (1987 film), a British television film by Barry Collins
- Land (2018 film), an international drama by Babak Jalali
- Land (2021 film), a drama directed by and starring Robin Wright

=== Music ===
- Dah (band), a former Yugoslav/Belgian rock band, known as Land during 1975-1976 period
- Land (1975–2002), an album by Patti Smith
- Land (band), an American rock band
  - Land (Land album), 1995
- Land (worship band), a Scottish Christian band
- Land (The Comsat Angels album), 1983
- Land (Týr album), 2008
- "Land", 2019 song by Psapp from their album Tourists
- Lands (band), a Japanese rock band

=== Other media ===
- Land (book), a 2021 non-fiction book by Simon Winchester
- Land (magazine), a Swedish weekly magazine
- The Land (weekly newspaper)
- Land (journal), a scientific journal
- Toji (novel) "Toji" is a Korean word that means "land" and is the title of this novel by Pak Kyongni.
- Land (O'Farrell novel) is a 2026 novel written by Maggie O'Farrell.

== Places ==
- Land Glacier, a glacier in Marie Byrd Land, Antarctica
- Land, Norway, a region and historic petty kingdom in Norway
- Land Municipality, a former municipality (1838–1847) in Eastern Norway
- The Lands, the common name for Anangu Pitjantjatjara Yankunytjatjara, or APY Lands, in South Australia

=== Division of a country ===
- Province of Austria
- Länder of Germany, the states of Germany (singular: Land)
- Lands of Denmark
- Lands of Finland
- Lands of Norway
- Lands of Sweden
- Czech lands

== Other uses ==
- -land, a suffix used in the names of several countries and other regions
- LAND, a type of denial-of-service attack
- Land (economics), a factor of production comprising all naturally occurring resources
- Land (novel) a disambiguation page.
- Land (surname)
- Landing, the end of a flight
- In rifling, lands are the raised areas between grooves in gun barrels

== See also ==
- Land Instruments International, a company specialising in temperature monitoring equipment
- Land law
- The Land (disambiguation)
- 土地 (disambiguation)
