= The Land =

The Land may refer to:

== Film ==
- The Land (1969 film), 1969 Egyptian film
- The Land (1974 film), 1974 South Korean film
- The Land (2015 film), 2015 short documentary directed by Erin Davis about an adventure playground of the same name
- The Land (2016 film), coming-of-age film directed by Steven Caple Jr.

== Literature ==
- The Land (Torres novel), a novel by Brazilian writer Antonio Torres published by Readers International.
- The Land (Taylor novel), a novel by Mildred D. Taylor
- Haaretz, Israeli newspaper whose name means "The Land" (as in the Land of Israel)
- The Land (newspaper), a rural newspaper in Australia owned by Australian Community Media
- The Land (magazine), a British rural magazine
- The Land, setting of Stephen R. Donaldson novels in The Chronicles of Thomas Covenant, the Unbeliever
- The Land, setting for Robert J. Sawyer novels in Quintaglio Ascension Trilogy
- The Land (poem), narrative poem by English poet Vita Sackville-West

== Music ==
- The Land (song), British protest song

== Place ==
- The Land (Epcot), pavilion at Walt Disney World's Epcot theme park
- The Land (adventure playground), junk playground located near Wrexham in north Wales, UK
- The Land, American venue of the Michigan Women's Music Festival
- "The Land", one of the nicknames of Cleveland

== See also ==
- Land (disambiguation)
- Landworker
