= Landworkers' Alliance =

UK organization for food sovereignty and land reform

- Formation: 2012; 14 years ago
- Location: United Kingdom
- Affiliations: La Via Campesina
- Website: Official website

The Landworkers' Alliance (LWA) is an organisation in the United Kingdom representing small farmers, growers, foresters and land-based workers established in 2012 under the name Via Campesina UK, and incorporated 2015. The organisation campaigns for better food and land-use systems.

The organisation works internationally on topics such as food sovereignty through membership of the international peasants advocacy organisation, Via Campesina, which represents over 200 million peasants, farmers and land-based workers through 182 member organisations. The LWA is one of two organisations in the UK affiliated to Via Campesina, the other being the Scottish Crofting Federation.

They launched a manifesto for tackling rural inequality at the Oxford Real Farming Conference in 2016, and are twinned to US based Farm Hack to bring their model of supporting new farmers to the UK.

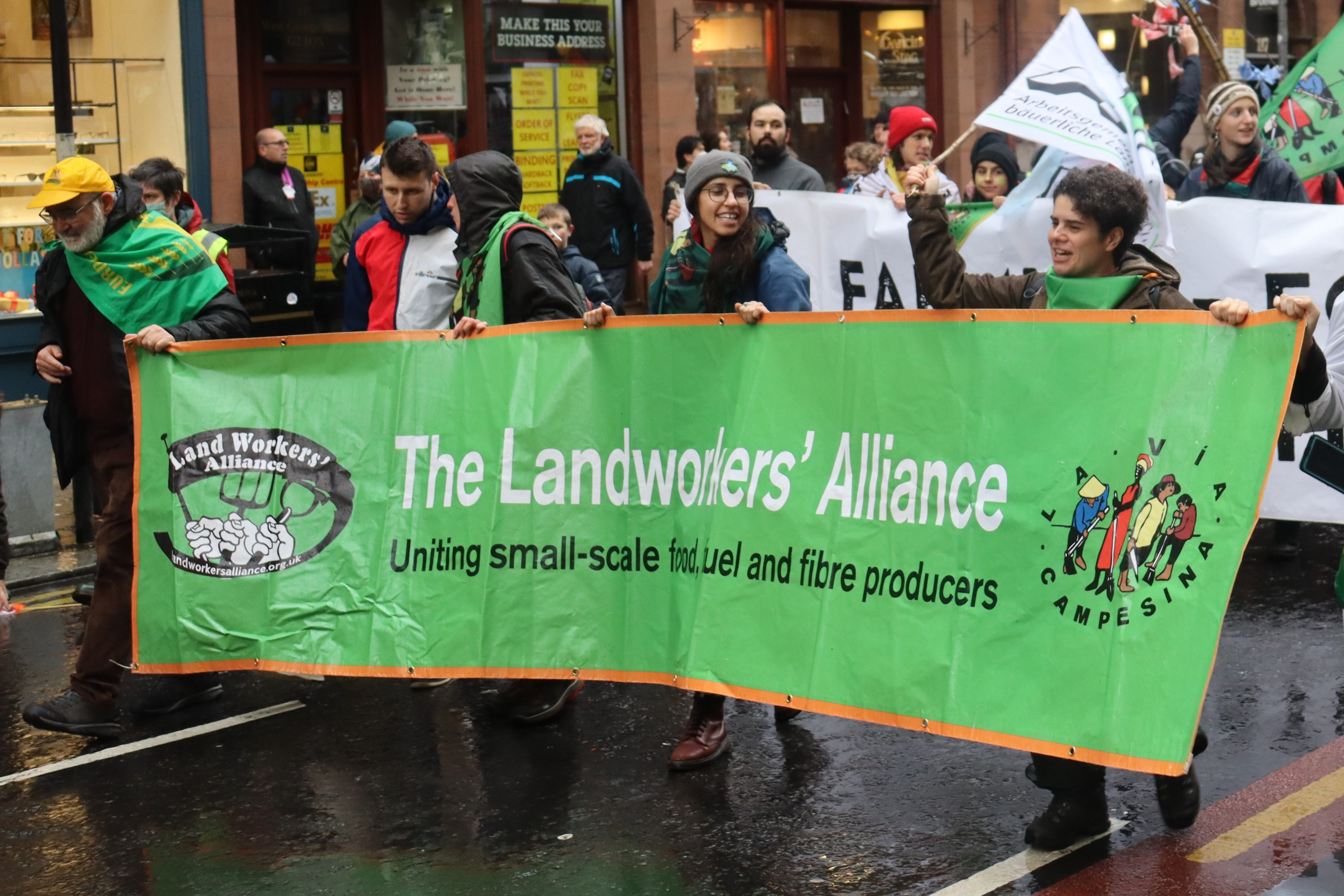
Landworkers' Alliance demonstrators at a 2021 COP26 protest in Glasgow, Scotland

The organisation has been critical of the Department for Environment, Food and Rural Affairs (Defra), saying that Defra is preferential to Corporate farming and Agribusiness. On 17 April 2014, the LWA held a protest outside the headquarters of Defra. In June, the LWA welcomed the dismissal of Owen Paterson as Environment Secretary.

In February 2014, The Economist hosted a summit regarding food insecurity in Africa. Only one farmer was permitted to attend the event and representatives of LWA were excluded as none of them could afford the high entry fee.

The LWA supports land reform to hinder and regulate large estates. In July 2024, the LWA held a protest against Discovery Land Company's purchase of the 8,000-acre Taymouth Castle estate to turn it into a luxury resort, and advocate for stronger regulations on large estates. The LWA said the Land Reform (Scotland) Bill going through the Scottish Parliament was not enough to curb large estates and protect the interest of locals against the "super rich".

== See also ==
- Agroecology
- Permaculture
- National Union of Agricultural and Allied Workers
