= Via Campesina =

International agricultural organization

La Vía Campesina
- Abbreviation: LVC
- Established: 1993 (Mons, Belgium)
- Type: Social movement, Smallholding and independent farmers advocacy
- Purpose: International Peasants Movement
- Headquarters: Bagnolet, France
- Region served: Worldwide
- Members: 182 organisations, in 81 countries
- General Coordinator: Morgan Ody
- Key people: Elizabeth Mpofu, Rajeev Patel, José Bové, Rafael Alegría, Guy Kastler, Saraiva Fernandes
- Website: viacampesina.org

La Vía Campesina (from Spanish: la vía campesina, meaning the peasant way) is an international farmers organization founded in 1993 in Mons, Belgium, formed by 182 organisations in 81 countries, and describing itself as "an international movement which coordinates peasant organizations of small and middle-scale producers, agricultural workers, rural women, and indigenous communities from Asia, Africa, America, and Europe".

La Via Campesina advocates for family farm-based sustainable agriculture, and was the group that coined the term "food sovereignty". La Vía Campesina carries out campaigns to defend farmer's right to seeds, to stop violence against women, for agrarian reform, and generally for the recognition of the rights of peasants.

== History ==
=== Background and approach ===
Map of countries with a member organization of La Vía Campesina

Starting in the 1980s governments were intervening less in the rural countryside, which weakened corporate control over peasants' organizations while making a living in agriculture more difficult. As a result, national peasant groups began to form ties with transnational organizations, starting in Latin America and then on a global scale.

The peasants' rights movement emerged from the new rights advocacy which had arisen in the 1990s; during that time, human rights and development agendas became integrated which expanded from political and civil rights to include social and economic rights. The agrarian peasants' movement moved to challenge the hegemonic ideology of neoliberalism in global economics and to find alternatives that would protect the rights of workers around the world.

In Europe, Via Campesina members participated the 2024 "tractorada" farm protests, when agricultural vehicles blocked main roads in Western Europe; it briefly allied with COPA-COGECA which they claimed represented major producers and suppliers of low-cost, widely sourced food. Such organizations may, some have said, be linked or financed by far right groups since they also advocate for less official interference in environmental and social areas such as worker-protection.

=== Relation to international entities ===
The organization was founded in 1993 by farmers organizations from Europe, Latin America, Asia, North America, Central America and Africa. The foundation followed the Uruguay Round of the General Agreement on Tariffs and Trade (GATT), where the World Trade Organization (WTO)'s Agreement on Agriculture and the Trade Related Intellectual Property Rights (TRIPS) were signed and approved. These agreements caused backlash from many people around the world for focusing on technical problems rather than the human right to access to food, especially for those living in the Global South. Globalization was under way at this time, affecting many industries including agriculture. La Vía Campesina gave small farmers a platform to have their voices heard about how these changes were impacting their lives.

The movement has grown and is now recognized as a part of the global dialogue on food and agriculture. It has presented in several international fora, such as:

- The Food and Agriculture Organization of the United Nations (FAO);
- The International Union for the Protection of New Varieties of Plants (UPOV);
- The UN Human Rights Council (HRC);
- The World Intellectual Property Organization (WIPO).

Via Campesina has been involved in the negotiations of the United Nations Declaration on the Rights of Peasants and other people living in Rural areas, adopted by the UN General Assembly in December 2018.

=== Priorities ===
According to La Via Campesina's webpage, the movement's main issues are promoting food sovereignty; demanding agrarian reform; people's control over land, water, territories; resisting free-trade; promoting popular peasant feminism; upholding human rights, rights of migrant workers; promoting agroecology; promoting peasant seeds systems; increasing the participation of youth in agriculture.

In recent years, the movement has placed greater emphasis on gender issues and women's rights, and strengthened its opposition to transnational corporations. It has also focused on gaining recognition for the discourse around food sovereignty, reclaiming the term "peasant" and recreating a shared peasant identity across national borders and cultures. La Vía Campesina also partners with other social movements and non-governmental organizations (NGOs) to strengthen its international presence.

The most systematic and comprehensive organic and living alternative to existing hegemonies comes not from the ivory towers or the factories but from the fields.

— Rajeev Patel (2006, 90) Globalize the Struggle! Globalize Hope! – La Vía Campesina

Democratic decision-making is central to the mission of La Vía Campesina, and it has been dedicated to fair representation and engagement of all participants, making structural changes when necessary. The perspectives of people around the world are needed to assess and improve global food production and sovereignty. Part of this effort for equality among movement members is creating a shared peasant identity. The reclaiming of this identity has been called "re-peasantization". According to Desmarais (2008), the term "peasant" in English has a connotation related to feudalism, but in other languages and contexts, the meaning is broader; campesino comes from the word campo, meaning "countryside", which ties the people to the land. This feudalist connotation is one reason why the organization chose not to translate its name into English.

=== Awards ===
In November 2018, La Vía Campesina received the XV Navarra International Prize for Solidarity (Premio Internacional Navarra a la Solidaridad).

In June 2018, the autonomous, pluralist and multicultural movement, which is entirely independent of any political or economic affiliation, was awarded the Lush Spring Prize Influence Award

In 2015, the organization received an award from the Latin American Scientific Society for Agroecology (SOCLA) "in recognition of its example of tireless struggle in favor of agroecology and the rights of peasants, in carrying out its mission to take care of the earth, feed the world, conserve biodiversity and cool the planet, through its constant search for food sovereignty in Latin America."

In 2004, La Vía Campesina was awarded the International Human Rights Award by Global Exchange, in San Francisco.

== Organization ==
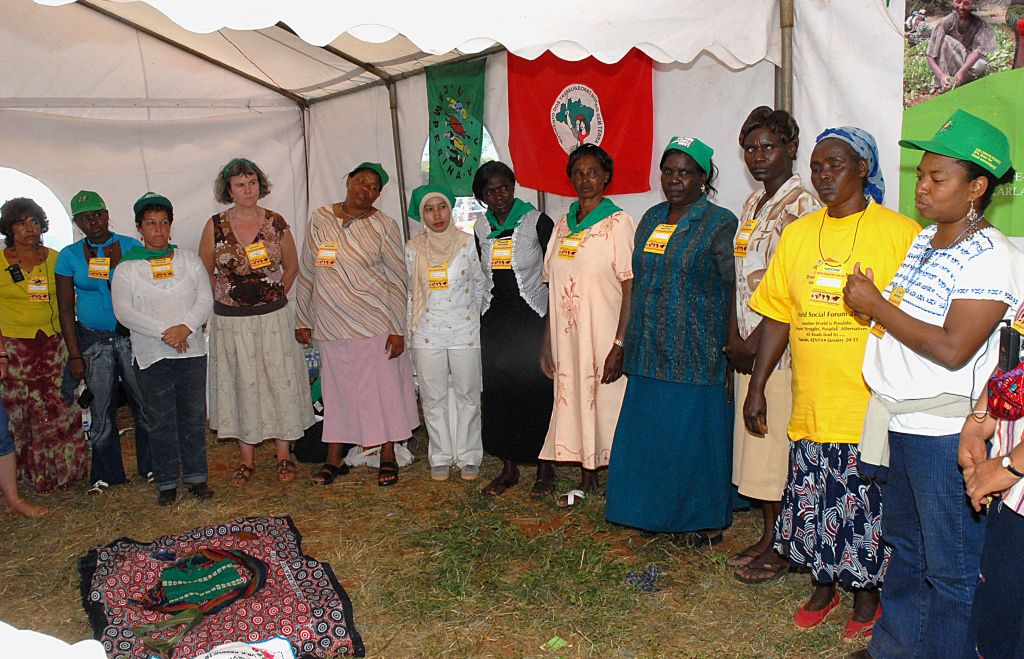
Women member of Via Campesina during the 7th World Social Forum (Nairobi, 2007)

La Vía Campesina is a grassroots movement, with activism at the local and national level. Members come from 81 countries, organised into 9 regions. The International Coordinating Committee is represented by one man and one woman per region and one youth per continent, each elected by their respective region's member organisations. With about 182 local and national organisations as part of the movement, La Via Campesina represents an estimated 200 million farmers around the world.

According to Michael Menser, La Via Campesina is an example of the success and expansion of transnational movements in regards to participatory democracy due to its organization model and adaptation to ensure fair representation.

=== Meetings ===
Representatives from each region meet at International Conferences roughly every four years. Past meetings were held in Mons in 1993, Tlaxcala City in 1996, Bangalore in 2000, São Paulo in 2004, Maputo in 2008, Jakarta in 2013, and Derio in 2017. The international secretariat changes its central location every 4 years based on the decision made at the International Conference. Past locations were Belgium (1993–1996), Honduras (1997–2004), Indonesia (2005–2013) and Harare (2013–2021).

Since November 2021, the secretariat has been in Bagnolet, France. The current General Coordinator is Morgan Ody, a vegetable producer from Bretagne, France, member of La Confédération paysanne and European Coordination Via Campesina (ECVC).

=== Women's involvement ===
Gender was ignored as a consideration at the start of the movement. At the signing of the Managua Declaration—the precursor to La Vía Campesina—all eight people present were men. Peasant women started to become more involved and pushing for women's rights at the International Conference in Tlaxcala in 1996. At this meeting, they decided to form a committee dedicated to women's rights and gender issues, which eventually became the Vía Campesina's Women's Commission. The women on the committee were also heavily involved in editing the draft of the cornerstone position on food sovereignty that was presented at the World Food Summit in 1996. They included health as a consideration for food production without agro-chemicals, as well as the importance of women's involvement in policy changes because women typically were barred from political involvement. The women of La Vía Campesina are still working for greater representation and engagement of peasant women, especially in leadership positions.

== Food sovereignty ==
La Vía Campesina introduced the right of food sovereignty at the World Food Summit in 1996 as "the right of peoples to healthy and culturally appropriate food produced through sustainable methods and their right to define their own food and agriculture systems." The phrase "culturally appropriate" signifies that the food that is available and accessible for the population should fit with the cultural background of the people consuming it. For example, subsidised and imported wheat products would not fall under this category in a country where corn-based foods were the basis of traditional meals.

Issue	Dominant model	Food sovereignty
Trade	Free trade in everything	Food and agriculture exempt from trade agreements
Production priority	Agroexports	Food for local markets
Crop prices	"What the market dictates" (leave the mechanisms that create both low crop prices and speculative food price hikes intact)	Fair prices that cover costs of production and allow farmers and farm workers a life with dignity
Market access	Access to foreign markets	Access to local markets; an end to the displacement of farmers from their own markets by agribusiness
Subsidies	While prohibited in the Third World, many subsidies are allowed in the US and Europe, but are paid only to the largest farmers	Subsidies are OK that do not damage other countries via dumping (i.e. grant subsidies only to family farmers for direct marketing, price/ income support, soil conservation, conversion to sustainable farming, research, etc.)
Food	Chiefly a commodity	A human right: specifically, should be healthy, nutritious, affordable, culturally appropriate, and locally produced
Being able to produce	An option for the economically efficient	A right of rural peoples
Hunger	Due to low productivity	Problem of access and distribution due to poverty and inequality
Food security	Achieved by importing food	Greatest when food production is in the hands of the hungry, or produced locally
Control over productive resources (land, water, forests)	Privatized	Under local community control
Access to land	Via the market	Via agrarian reform
Seeds	Patentable commodity	Common heritage of humanity, held in trust by rural communities and cultures; "no patents on life"
Rural credit and investment	From private banks and corporations	From the public sector, designed to support family agriculture
Dumping	Not an issue	Must be prohibited
Monopoly	Not an issue	The root of most problems
Overproduction	No such thing, by definition	Drives prices down and farmers into poverty; we need supply management policies in US and EU
Farming technology	Industrial, monoculture, Green Revolution, chemical-intensive; uses GMOs	Agroecology, sustainable farming, no GMOs
Farmers	Anachronism, the inefficient will disappear	Guardians of culture and crop germplasm; stewards of productive resources; repositories of knowledge; internal marker and building block of broad-based, inclusive economic development
Urban consumers	Workers to be paid as little as possible	Need living wages
Genetically modified organisms (GMOs)	The wave of the future	Bad for health and the environment; an unnecessary technology
Source: Rosset (2003)

=== Food sovereignty vs. food security ===
Food sovereignty differs from food security. Food security was defined as "physical, social, and economic access to sufficient, safe, and nutritious food... at all times to meet [the population's] dietary and food preferences for an active and healthy life" by D. Moyo at the American Society of International Law annual meeting in 2007. Food security is more focused on the provision of food for all by whatever means necessary, whether by local production or global imports. As a result, economic policies concerned with food security typically emphasize industrial farming that can produce more food cheaper.

=== Food regimes ===
Friedmann defines a food regime as a "rule governed structure of production and consumption of food on a world scale". A food regime is marked by a period of transition in food production that results in significant social, political, and economic change. The current situation of global food production can be called the "corporate food regime" due to the concentration of supplying and processing food in the private sector. For example, US corporations have control over food production by subcontracting smaller farmers, which allows them to participate and profit without taking on the risks of farming, such as weather and disease. Food regimes are the result of "political struggles among contending social groups" for control over how food production is framed and conceptualized, according to McMichael. The corporate food regime came about with the neoliberal economic theory which is motivated by efficiency and trade liberalization, and states that nations should focus their efforts and resources on producing goods and services where they have an advantage relative to other nations (that is, goods that they are best at producing), as cited by Philip McMichael. The corporate food regime has existed for only the last 100 years, as compared to the millennia prior to industrialization and the Green Revolution.

== See also ==
- Environmental movement
- Peasant movement
- UN Declaration on the Rights of Peasants
- United Nations Decade of Family Farming
- Agricultural policy
- Agroecological restoration
- Back-to-the-land movement
- Family farming
- Local food
- General Agreement on Tariffs and Trade (GATT)
- World Trade Organization (WTO)
- WTO's Agreement on Agriculture
- WTO's TRIPS agreement
- The National Farmers Union in Canada
- Abahlali baseMjondolo in South Africa
- The Bhumi Uchhed Pratirodh Committee in India
- The Sindicato Labrego Galego-Comisións Labregas in Galiza.
- The EZLN in Mexico
- Fanmi Lavalas in Haiti
- Good Food March
- Nyéléni
- The Homeless Workers' Movement in Brazil
- The Landless Peoples Movement in South Africa
- The Landless Workers' Movement in Brazil
- Movement for Justice en el Barrio in the United States of America
- Narmada Bachao Andolan in India
- Take Back the Land in the United States of America
- The Western Cape Anti-Eviction Campaign in South Africa
- The Indonesian Peasants Union in Indonesia
- Agroecology
- Elizabeth Mpofu
- Guy Kastler
- José Bové
