= José Bové =

French farmer, politician and syndicalist activist (born 1953)

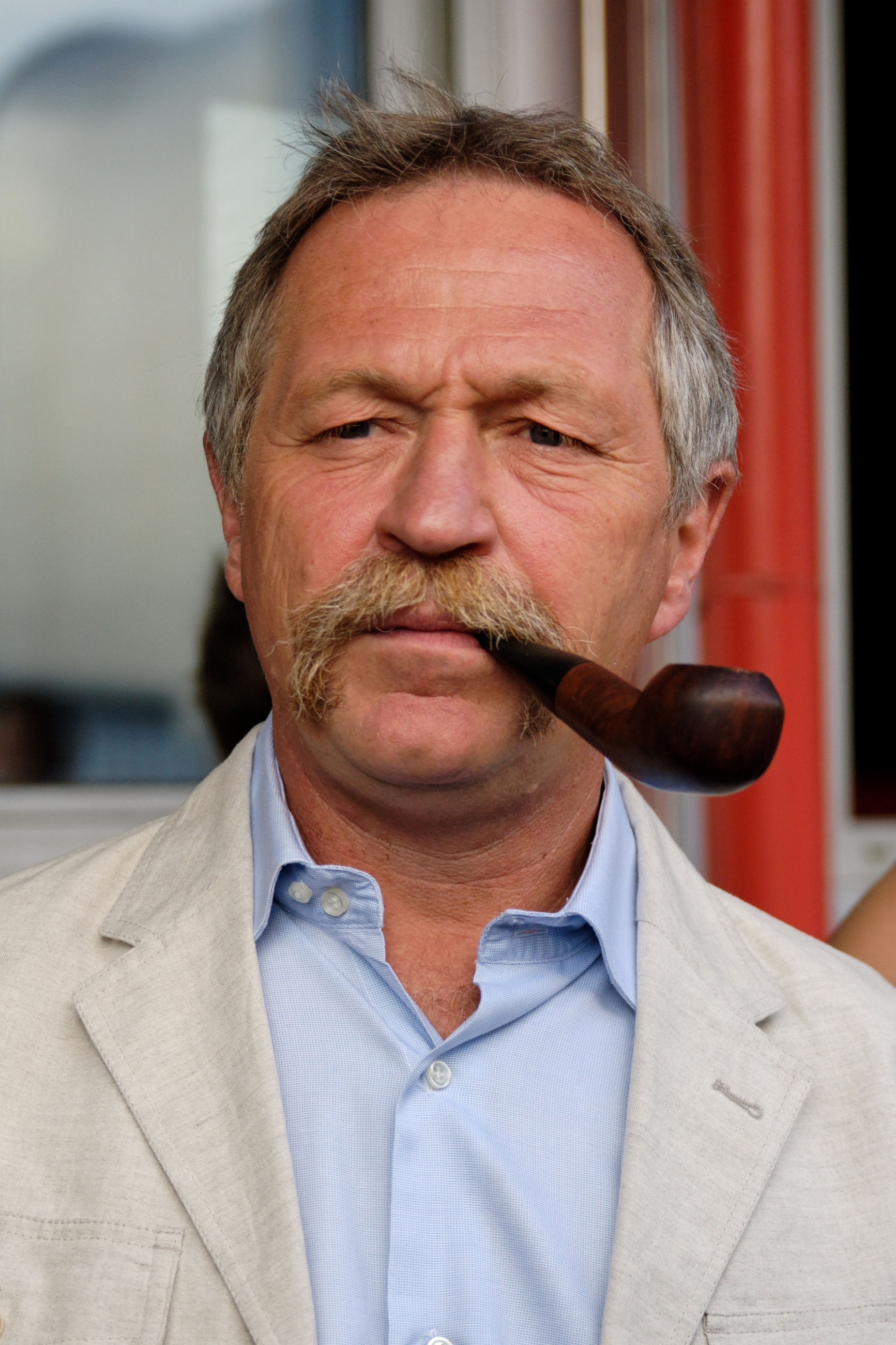
- Bové in 2009

Member of the European Parliament
- In office 20 July 2009 – 1 July 2019
- Parliamentary group: Greens/EFA
- Constituency: South-West France

Personal details
- Born: Joseph Bové; 11 June 1953 (age 73) Talence, France
- Education: Bordeaux Montaigne University
- Occupation: Farmer, politician, syndicalist

Joseph "José" Bové (French pronunciation: [ʒoze bɔve]; born 11 June 1953) is a French farmer, labor leader and alter-globalization activist, and spokesman for Via Campesina. He was one of the twelve official candidates in the 2007 French presidential election. He served in the European Parliament as a member of the European Green Party in 2009–2014 and 2014–2019.

== Early life ==
José Bové was born in Talence, near Bordeaux, but was raised in many different places. As a child he lived both inside and outside France, including the United States. Bové speaks English fluently, as his parents moved with him to Berkeley, California when he was three. They were invited to be researchers at the University of California, Berkeley.

After they returned to France, they lived in Paris. Bové attended a Jesuit secondary school near Paris (from which he was expelled for being "faithless"). While at university, he associated with anarchists and pacifists. When asked to serve in the army, he refused as a conscientious objector. While waiting for his court appeal, he went into hiding and worked as a shepherd in the mountains.

== Anti-military activist ==
In 1976, Bové joined the Fight for the Larzac, a movement protesting the proposed expansion of a military camp on the Larzac plateau. It would have displaced regional sheep farmers and changed the ecology of the area. He joined a band of peasants occupying the threatened territory and illegally building a sheep barn. The protest eventually succeeded, and the government cancelled the military plan. As a result of that experience, Bové became a sheep farmer there, producing Roquefort cheese.

== Agricultural unionist ==
Bové continued both as a farmer and an activist. In 1987, he formed the Confédération Paysanne, an agricultural union. It promotes the quality of life for humans and the environment, promoting organic farming. In opposition to many companies in the profit-oriented agro-industry, Bové is a prominent opponent of genetically modified organisms (GMO). In 1995 he joined Greenpeace on their ship, the Rainbow Warrior, in a voyage to protest nuclear weapons testing in the Pacific Ocean. He has also been part of the anarchist organization Alternative Libertaire.

Bové and the Confédération gained national and international attention in 1999 by dismantling a McDonald's franchise that was under construction in Millau (Aveyron). Considered by his supporters to be non-violent, Bové designed this protest against new US restrictions on importing Roquefort cheese and other products, which were harming the farmers who live from these products, and to raise awareness about McDonald's' use of hormone-treated beef. Bové was sentenced to three months' imprisonment for his role; he was imprisoned for 44 days and released early on 1 August 2002.

Later, the European Union imposed restrictions on importing hormone-treated beef (see Sanitary and Phytosanitary Agreement). The World Trade Organization, of which both the US and France are members, disallowed this restriction. After the EU refused to comply and remove the restrictions, the United States placed punitive tariffs on the importation of certain European goods, including Roquefort cheese, in retaliation.

== Alter-globalization activist ==
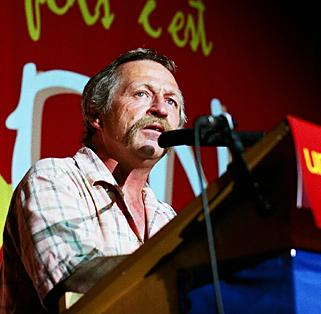
José Bové, Paris, May 2005

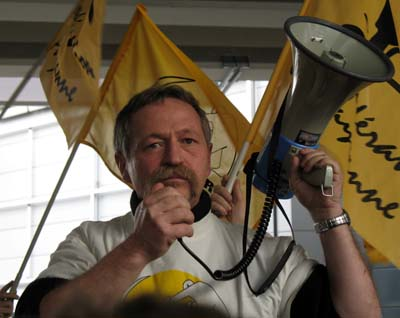
José Bové at an anti-GMO protest in March 2006

During an interview by Lynn Jeffress for Z magazine in June 2001, Bové explained why he destroyed the McDonald's, saying: "This is a fight against free trade global capitalism. It's about the logic of a certain economic system, not an American system. It can be a struggle against any country, this one or that one." Bové has participated in numerous anti-globalization movements. In June 1997 he took part in the first anti-GM mowing. The same year that he took part in destruction of the McDonald's, he attended the protests in Seattle against the World Trade Organization meeting. Bové became a figure of anti-globalization.

Since then, he has redoubled his efforts in the world peasant and anti-globalization movements. He has said that he does not oppose the WTO and global rules, and agrees there is a need for such forms. But his resistance, as stated by his followers, is directed against the lack of democracy in how these rules are developed, approved and implemented. Bové is a founding member of ATTAC.

In 2001 Bové took part in a major action destroying genetically modified crops in Brazil. In 2005 he campaigned for a "No" vote in the French referendum on the EU Constitution; the proposal was defeated.

== Controversies ==
In April 2002 Bové was at the head of an activist group arriving in the West Bank to protest the massive Israeli Army operation, Operation Defensive Shield, conducted at that time, which had caused many Palestinian casualties. The group entered Yassir Arafat's headquarters in Ramallah, at the time besieged by Israeli forces. Bové joined with members of the newly established International Solidarity Movement (ISM), who were acting as "human shields" at the Palestinian Presidential Compound so as to deter the army from breaking in.

After spending a day in the besieged headquarters, Bové came out and was promptly arrested and deported by Israeli police. Upon his return to France, he was met by dozens of pro-Israeli and pro-Palestinian demonstrators, who scuffled briefly at Paris' Orly Airport.

In an interview in 2002 with TV channel Canal Plus, Bové said he believed that the wave of attacks against French synagogues was being either arranged or fabricated by Mossad (the Israeli secret service). "Who profits from the crime?" Bové asked. "The Israeli government and its secret services have an interest in creating a certain psychosis, in making believe that there is a climate of antisemitism in France, in order to distract attention from what they are doing." Considerable outrage was expressed after his remarks, and he later apologized for the statement. His visit to Arafat was denounced in a speech by the head of France's CRIF, an umbrella group for Jewish organisations.

Bové has intervened to support the movements of the Tahitians and the Kanaks, the indigenous Melanesian people of New Caledonia. On 23 April 2004 he announced that he would join the People's Congress of Kurdistan (Kongra-Gel). This group has been classified as terrorist by both the European Union and the United States State Department.

== Civil disobedience ==
In 1976, Bové was sentenced and served three weeks of imprisonment for having destroyed documents belonging to the military, when opposing extension of Larzac military camp.

In 2002, Bové was sentenced to three months' imprisonment for his role in the 1999 destruction (he and his party dismantled the building during one night) of a McDonald's franchise in Millau, Aveyron. He served 44 days and was released on 1 August 2002.

On 22 June 2003 Bové began serving a sentence of ten months for the destruction of transgenic crops. ATTAC protested and called for him to be freed. A general pardon of prisoners issued for Bastille Day, together with an individual action in his case by President Jacques Chirac, reduced the sentence to seven months. Both supporters and opponents expressed dissatisfaction with the Presidential pardon, saying that it was entirely inadequate and wholly unjustified, respectively. On 15 November 2005, the Toulouse court of appeals sentenced Bové to 4 months in jail for having destroyed genetically engineered corn from a field. Other defendants, such as Noël Mamère, got suspended sentences.

In February 2006, Bové was stopped at entry by U.S. Customs and Border Protection agents at New York's JFK Airport. He was traveling to Cornell University's School of Industrial and Labor Relations for events sponsored by Cornell's Global Labor Institute. According to Bové, the Customs agents told him he was "ineligible" to enter the U.S. due to his past prosecutions for "moral crimes." After being detained for several hours, Bové was placed on an Air France flight to Paris.

On 11 October 2016, Bové was denied entry to Canada because of his convictions related to protests, notably against McDonald's. He was subsequently allowed to stay in the country for seven days.

== Political life ==
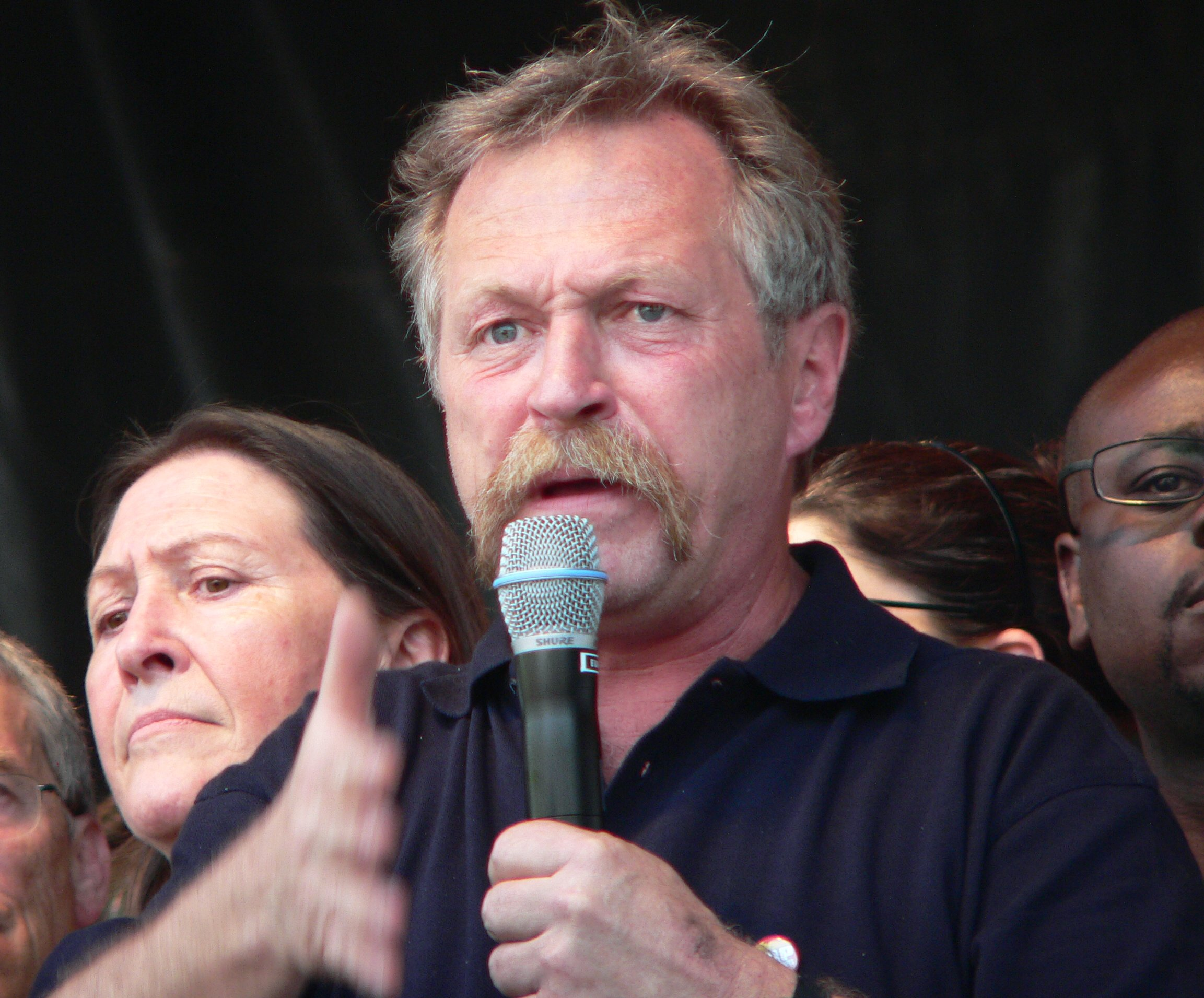
15 April 2007 electoral meeting in Paris

In January 2007, following an appeal from his supporters, who gathered 40,000 signatures, Bové announced he would run as a candidate that year in the 2007 French presidential election. He formally declared on 1 February and in six weeks gained the required 500 signatures from elected officials necessary to be a candidate. He declared he was fighting for "the people that have no voice." He was trying to promote unity on the radical left and aiming to defeat the right and the far right, which had recently gained popularity. He was endorsed by actress Juliette Binoche, who has international renown.

On 19 March Bové announced that he had secured the support necessary to reach the second stage, to be listed on the published ballot, alongside 11 other contenders. On the first round of the presidential election, Bové scored 1.32% of the popular vote (483,008 votes).

Following the French presidential elections, Bové became more closely associated with Europe Écologie, a coalition of French environmentalist political parties including the Green Party. In the 2009 European Parliament election, he headed the list of candidates for the South-West constituency. On 7 June 2009, he was elected to the European Parliament, as Europe Ecologie garnered more than 16% of the vote in a proportional electoral system. He was re-elected at the 2014 European Parliament election, and left the European Parliament at the end of his second term in 2019.

In 2022, he, along with fellow former Green MEPs Jean-Paul Besset and Daniel Cohn-Bendit, wrote an op-ed in Le Monde criticizing The Ecologist's entry into an electoral pact with La France Insoumise. The piece called LFI a party which "deliberately cultivates ambiguity regarding democratic values", particularly criticizing its ambiguous stance on the Ukraine war.

== Publications ==
In English translation

- The Food for the Future: Agriculture for a Global Age (2005), with Francois Dufour. (translated by Anna De Casparis)
- A Movement of Movements: Is Another World Really Possible? (2004), edited by Tom Mertes
- The World Is Not for Sale: Farmers Against Junk Food (2001), with Francois Dufour. (translated by Anna De Casparis)

In French

- Nous, Paysans (2000) with Gilles Luneau
- Le Monde n'est pas une marchandise; des paysans contre la malbouffe (2001) with François Dufour and Gilles Luneau
- Rural - Chronique d'une collision politique (2001) with Étienne Davodeau
- Retour de Palestine (2002)
- Paysan du Monde (2002) with Gilles Luneau
- La Confédération paysanne (2003) with Yves Manguy
- Pour la désobéissance civique (2004) with Gilles Luneau
- Hold up à Bruxelles - les lobbies au coeur de l'Europe (2014) with Gilles Luneau (La Découverte, ISBN 9782707186270)
- L'alimentation en otage (2015)

== See also ==
- List of peace activists
- Marie Bové
- Elizabeth Mpofu
- Guy Kastler
