= Landworker =

Landworker or land worker may refer to various topics regarding rural labour or those who work the land. It may also refer to:

- Farmworker, a labourer who is employed to work on a farm
- Landworkers' Alliance, a UK-based organisation
- The Landworker, a UK publication started by the NUAAW and now run by Unite the Union
