= Marie Bové =

French politician

Marie Bové is a French politician and a member of The Greens-Europe Écologie. She is also the daughter of José Bové, Member of the European Parliament.

She was The Greens-Europe Écologie's candidate in Aquitaine for the 2010 regional elections.

== Bibliography ==
- Marie Bové militante dès le berceaux in VSD
