= United Nations Decade of Family Farming =

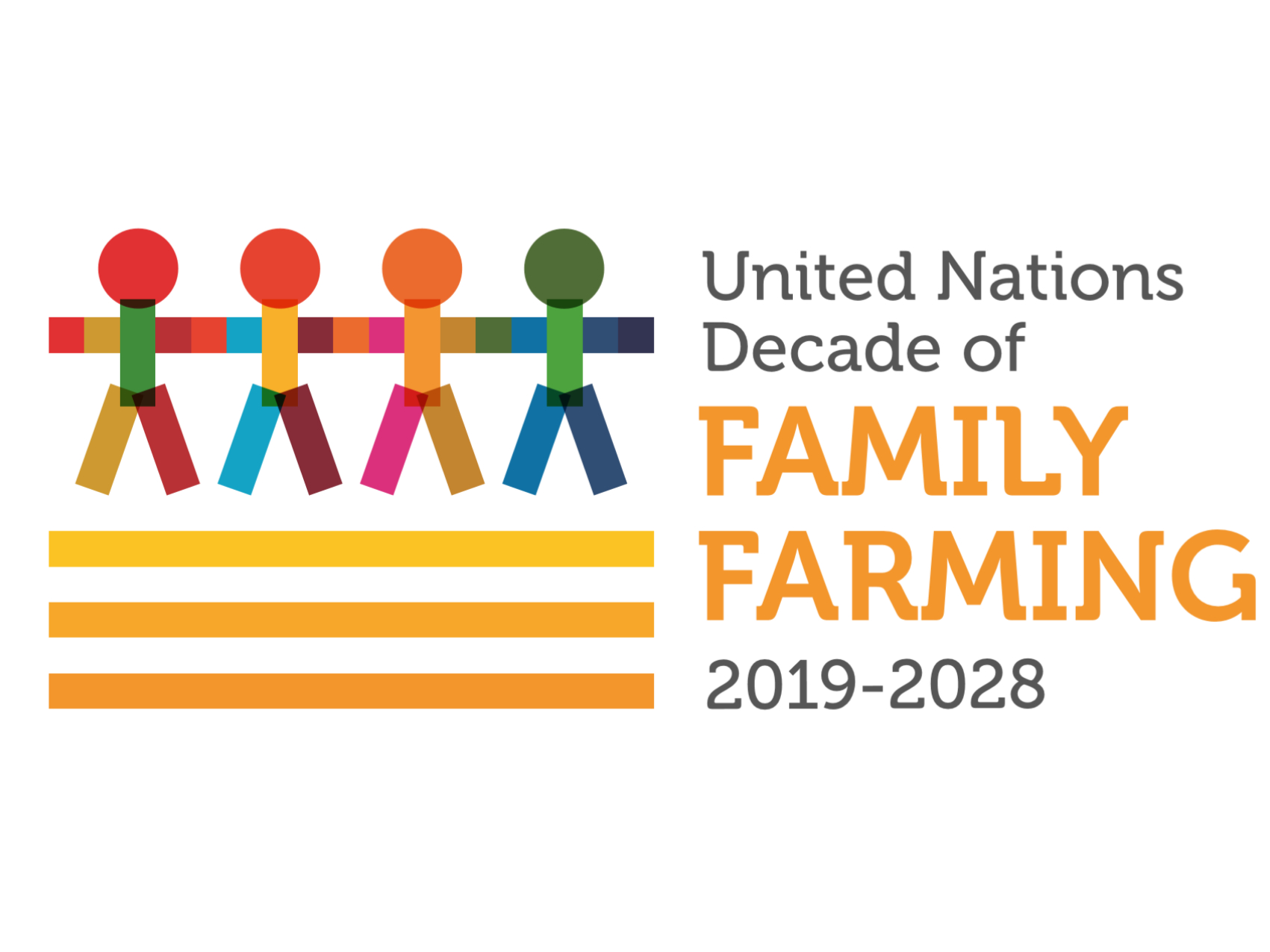
UN Decade of Family Farming 2019-2028 Logo

Endorsed in December 2017, the United Nations Decade of Family Farming 2019-2028 seeks to place family farming at the center of national public policies and investments. In declaring this decade, the United Nations General Assembly recognized the importance of family farming in reducing poverty and improving global food security (Resolution A/RES/72/239). The UN Decade of Family Farming is led by the Food and Agriculture Organization (FAO) and the International Fund for Agricultural Development (IFAD) in collaboration with governments and civil society organizations.

== Family farming ==
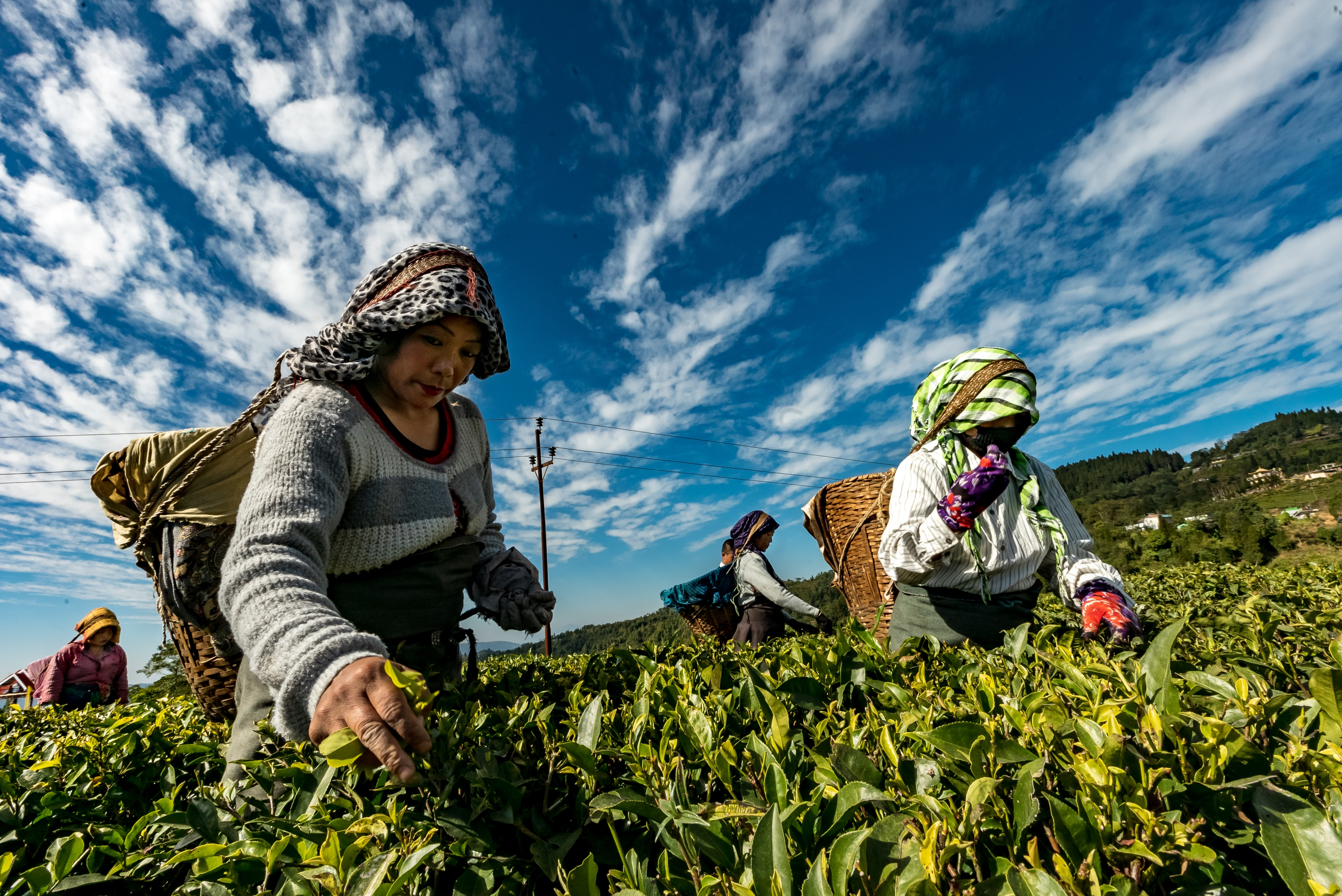

Though there is no single, universal definition of family farming, it can be defined as : “a means of organizing agricultural, forestry, fisheries, pastoral and aquaculture production which is managed and operated by a family and predominantly reliant on family labor, including both women’s and men’s. The family and the farm are linked, co-evolve and combine economic, environmental, reproductive, social, and cultural functions”.

Family Farming is the predominant form of agriculture in both developing and developed countries. In fact:

- There are an estimated 500 million family farms, representing over 90% of all farms globally
- Family farms produce more than 80% of the food in the world.
- More than 90% of farms are run by an individual or a family and rely primarily on family labor
- Most family farms are small (an estimated 84% of farms globally are below 2 hectares.

== Background ==
The United Nations declared 2014 the International Year of Family Farming (IYFF). Following the success of IYFF 2014, the United Nations General Assembly proclaimed 2019–2028, the United Nations Decade of Family Farming (UNDFF). The decade was launched on 29 May 2019.

An International Steering Committee (ISC UNDFF), composed of representatives of the Member States and family farmer organizations, oversees the implementation of the UNDFF. The ISC UNDFF is supported by the Food and Agriculture Organization (FAO) and the International Fund for Agricultural Development (IFAD) joint secretariat.

== Aims ==
A world where diverse, healthy and sustainable food and agricultural systems flourish, where resilient rural and urban communities enjoy a high quality of life in dignity, equity, free from hunger and poverty. — FAO and IFAD, Excerpt from Vision statement of the UN Decade of Family Farming

The UNDFF seeks to address the need for a global food system that provides sufficient, affordable, and nutritious food while accounting for climate change and the growing population. According to FAO, by the year 2050, the world's agricultural production will need to increase by about 50% in order to feed the growing population. The UN considers that family farming holds the key to a sustainable food system and achieving the Sustainable Development Goals (SDGs).

The UNDFF serves as a framework for countries to develop public policies and investments to support family farming from a holistic perspective, unleashing the transformative potential of family farmers to contribute to achieving the SDGs.

According to FAO and IFAD, family farmers, with adequate support, have a unique capacity to "redress the failure of a world food system that, while producing enough food for all, still wastes one-third of the food produced, fails to reduce hunger, and the different forms of malnutrition, and even generates social inequalities."

=== Sustainable development goals ===
While countries have made significant efforts to achieve the Sustainable Development Goals, there are still many challenges that impede the realization of the targets by 2030. Conflict, urbanization, resource constraints, and climate change are amongst these challenging issues. Poverty and hunger are also constant challenges, while almost 80% of the world's poor depend on agricultural production.

The UN General Assembly assessed that in family farming lies the potential to achieve the SDGs. For instance: ensuring food security and diverse and sustainable nutrition; providing sufficient food for the growing population; preserving biodiversity and finding ways of productions that withstand climate change; reducing inequalities by helping generate income and providing more opportunities to men but also women and youth.

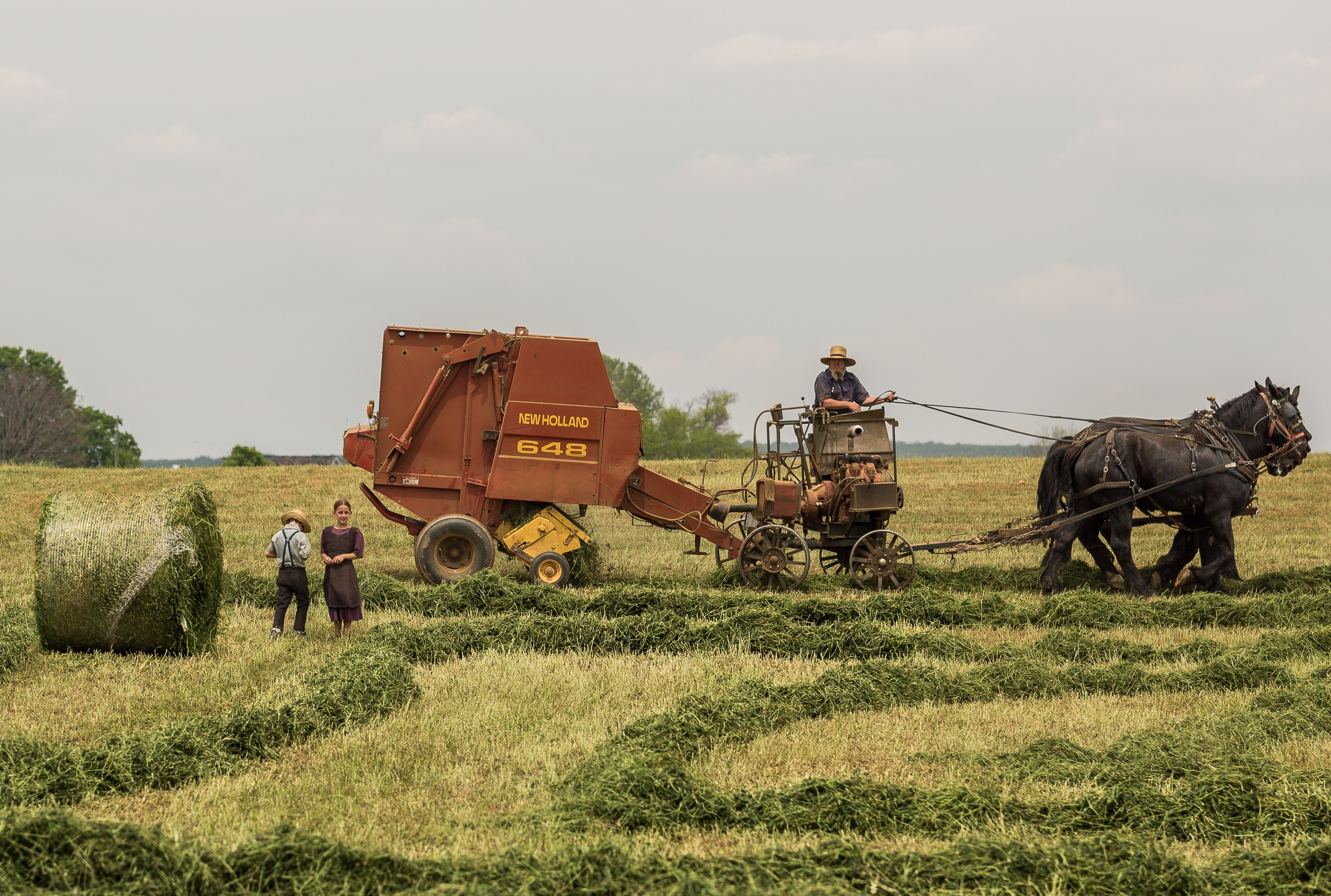

== UN Decade of Family Farming global action plan ==
The Global Action Plan of the United Nations Decade of Family Farming (2019–2028), put together by the joint secretariat of FAO and IFAD, is the result of an international consultation involving the representatives from many countries, family farmers, civil society and other relevant actors. It focuses on seven pillars:

- Pillar 1. Develop an enabling policy environment to strengthen family farming
- Pillar 2–Transversal. Support youth and ensure the generational sustainability of family farming
- Pillar 3–Transversal. Promote gender equity in family farming and the leadership role of rural women
- Pillar 4. Strengthen family farmers’ organizations and capacities to generate knowledge, represent farmers and provide inclusive services in the urban-rural continuum
- Pillar 5. Improve socio-economic inclusion, resilience, and well-being of family farmers, rural households and communities
- Pillar 6. Promote sustainability of family farming for climate-resilient food systems
- Pillar 7. Strengthen the multidimensionality of family farming to promote social innovations contributing to territorial development and food systems that safeguard biodiversity, the environment and culture

== Family Farming Knowledge Platform ==
With knowledge of national laws and regulations, practices, data, public policies, research, articles and publications, the Family Farming Knowledge Platform gathers digitized information on family farming internationally.

It centralises access to international, regional and national information related to family farming issues; it systematically integrates and organizes existing information to better inform and assist policy makers, family farming organizations, development practitioners, and the various stakeholders in the field and at the local level, by providing the knowledge they need.

== See also ==
- Family Farm / Family farming
- Sustainable Development Goals
- United Nations Declaration on the Rights of Peasants
- Food sovereignty
- Peasant movement
- United Nations Decade on Biodiversity
- UN Food and Agriculture Organization
