= Land (journal) =

- Discipline: Land management
- Language: English
- Edited by: Andrew Millington

Publication details
- History: 2012–present
- Publisher: MDPI
- Frequency: Monthly
- Open access: Yes
- License: Creative Commons Attribution

Standard abbreviations
- ISO 4: Land (Basel)

Indexing
- ISSN: 2073-445X
- OCLC no.: 844691182

Links
- Journal homepage

Land is a monthly peer-reviewed, open access, scientific journal that is published by MDPI. It was established in 2012. The journal explores land use/land change, land management, land system science, and landscape-related issues. The editor-in-chief is Andrew Millington (Flinders University).

== Abstracting and indexing ==
The journal is abstracted and indexed in:

- AGORA
- AGRICOLA
- CAB Abstracts
- Current Contents/Social & Behavioral Sciences
- Inspec
- ProQuest databases
- Scopus
- Social Sciences Citation Index
