= The Land (weekly newspaper) =

Coordinates: 44.163814°N 94.004872°W

- Type: Weekly newspaper
- Format: Tabloid
- Owner(s): Community Newspaper Holdings
- Publisher: Jim Santori
- Editor: Kevin Schulz
- Founded: 1976
- Headquarters: 418 S. 2nd Street; Mankato, MN 56001
- City: Mankato, Minnesota
- Country: United States
- Circulation: c. 20,790
- Price: Free to Minnesota farmers and agribusiness, $22/year otherwise
- Website: www.thelandonline.com

The Land is a weekly newspaper published in Mankato, Minnesota. It serves farmers, ranchers, rural residents and agribusiness across the entire state of Minnesota. Its two circulation zones, geographically covering approximately the southern one-third and northern two-thirds of the state, alternate weeks. The Land is published by The Free Press in Mankato.

== History ==
The Land was founded in 1976 by The Free Press. In 2020, the publisher was Steve Jameson. The general manager was Deb Petterson. The managing Editor was Paul Malchow. The motto of the newspaper, "Where farm and family meet", appears with its logo on each newspaper. The front page includes a large format farm-related picture. The newspaper is owned by Community Newspaper Holdings, Inc.
