= Biodiversity in agriculture =

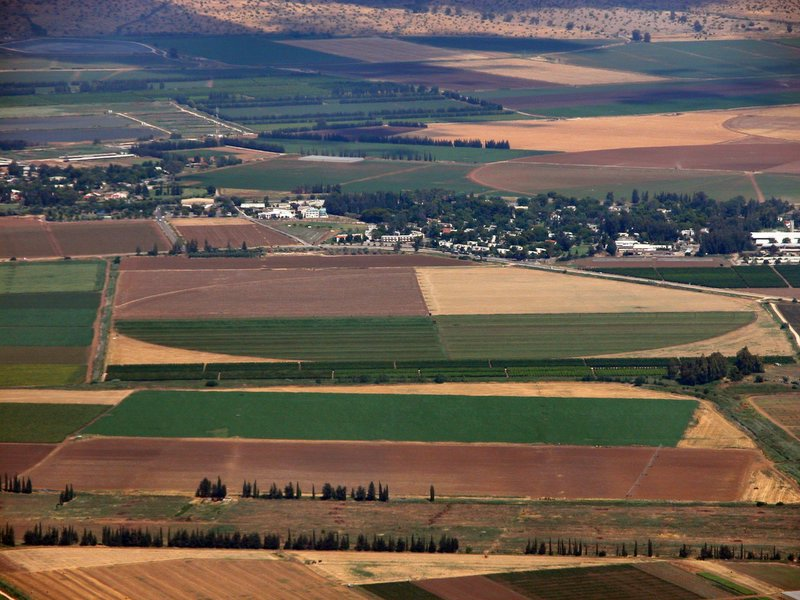
Agricultural lands with large areas of monoculture lacking heterogeneity.

Biodiversity in agriculture is the measure of biodiversity found on agricultural land. Biodiversity is the total diversity of species present in an area at all levels of biological organization. It is characterized by heterogeneous habitats that support the diverse ecological structure. In agricultural areas, biodiversity decreases as varying landscapes are lost and native plants are replaced with cultivated crops. Increasing biodiversity in agriculture can increase the sustainability of farms through the restoration of ecosystem services that aid in regulating agricultural lands. Biodiversity in agriculture can be increased through the process of agroecological restoration, as farm biodiversity is an aspect of agroecology.

Biodiversity is the measure of biotic and abiotic diversity in an ecosystem, described by heterogeneity. The loss of biodiversity in agriculture has been an increasing issue since the global increase of food demands and success of popular crops. This loss of heterogeneity declines species biodiversity on agricultural lands. Biodiversity in agriculture is essential in providing ecosystem services, which conserves biodiversity while providing agricultural services.

== Biodiversity loss ==
Agriculture creates a conflict over the use of land between wildlife and humans. Land use for agriculture has been a driving force in creating biodiversity loss An increase in the amount of pasture and crop land over the last few hundred years has led to the rapid loss of natural habitats. The Food and Agriculture Organization of the United Nations estimates that more than 40% of Earth's land surface is currently used for agriculture. Because so much land has been converted to agriculture, habitat loss is recognized as the driving force in biodiversity loss. A decline in farmland biodiversity can be traced to changes in farming practices and increased agricultural intensity. Nonetheless, according to the FAO, "biodiversity is just as important on farms and in fields as it is in deep river valleys or mountain cloud forests". In recent years, the world has acknowledged the value of biodiversity through treaties formed, such as in the 1992 Convention on Biological Diversity.

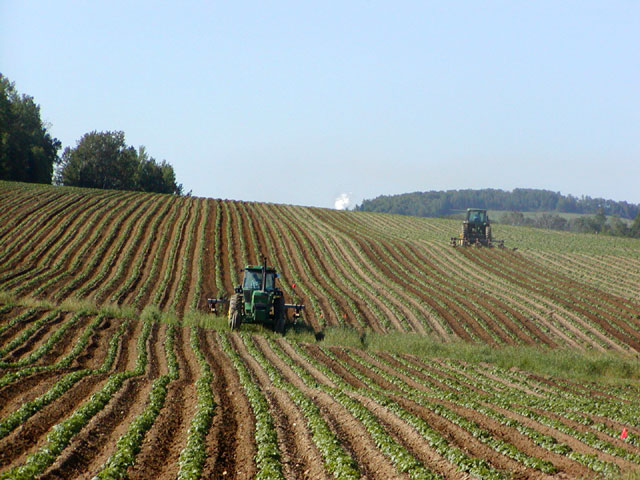
Monoculture results in the loss of biodiversity, as it prioritizes cultivated crops over native plants.

The loss of habitat connectivity caused by fragmentation in agricultural areas threatens biodiversity, as it decreases population sizes and restricts its access to external resources. Species facing habitat fragmentation can also create a genetic bottleneck The decreased gene pool threatens species through factors such as inbreeding depression, where the less advantageous populations lowers the species survival rates. Monoculture is the practice of producing a single crop on a given piece of land, including crop rotation. While monoculture produces optimum yields, it has implications for the biodiversity of farms. Heterogeneity, the diversity of the landscape, has been shown to be associated with species diversity. For example, butterfly abundance has been found to increase with heterogeneity. Land that is not cropped, such as fallow land, grass margins in the spaces between different fields, and strips of scrub along field boundaries increase heterogeneity and thus the biodiversity of a farm. Plants attract insects, which will attract certain species of birds, and those birds will attract their natural predators. The cover provided by non-cropped land allows species to move across the landscape. In Asian rice, one study showed crop diversification by growing flowering crops in strips beside rice fields could reduce pests so that insecticide spraying was reduced by 70%, yields increase by 5%, together resulting in an economic advantage of 7.5%.

== The Green Revolution ==
One of the issues facing biodiversity in areas of industrial agriculture is the loss of heterogeneity, described by the loss of a biotic and abiotic diversity. Since 1966, the Green Revolution enhanced agricultural productivity through technological, economic, and political advancements in an effort to increase food security globally. This includes the introduction of genetically modified crops, which allows for increased yield, pest resistance, and improved crop varieties. These advancements also led to increased global geographical spread of 52 agricultural crops with cereals such as wheat, rice, and maize showing the greatest increase in the past 50 years. The loss of agricultural heterogeneity decreases local food security due to a loss in crop diversity, despite its accommodation of global food demands.

== Heterogeneity ==
Heterogeneity is essential in increasing species heterogeneity, which maintain stable ecological structures essential to providing ecosystem services. Of the features associated with species diversity is land size, where a study proved a relationship between smaller agricultural fields and increased species richness. The area of an agricultural field is associated with organisms accessibility to the edges of the field, which usually allow access for fields with different biophysical and geophysical features. Increased accessibility to a diverse ecological features increases heterogeneity and reduces edge effects on populations inhabiting agricultural fields.

== Ecosystem services ==
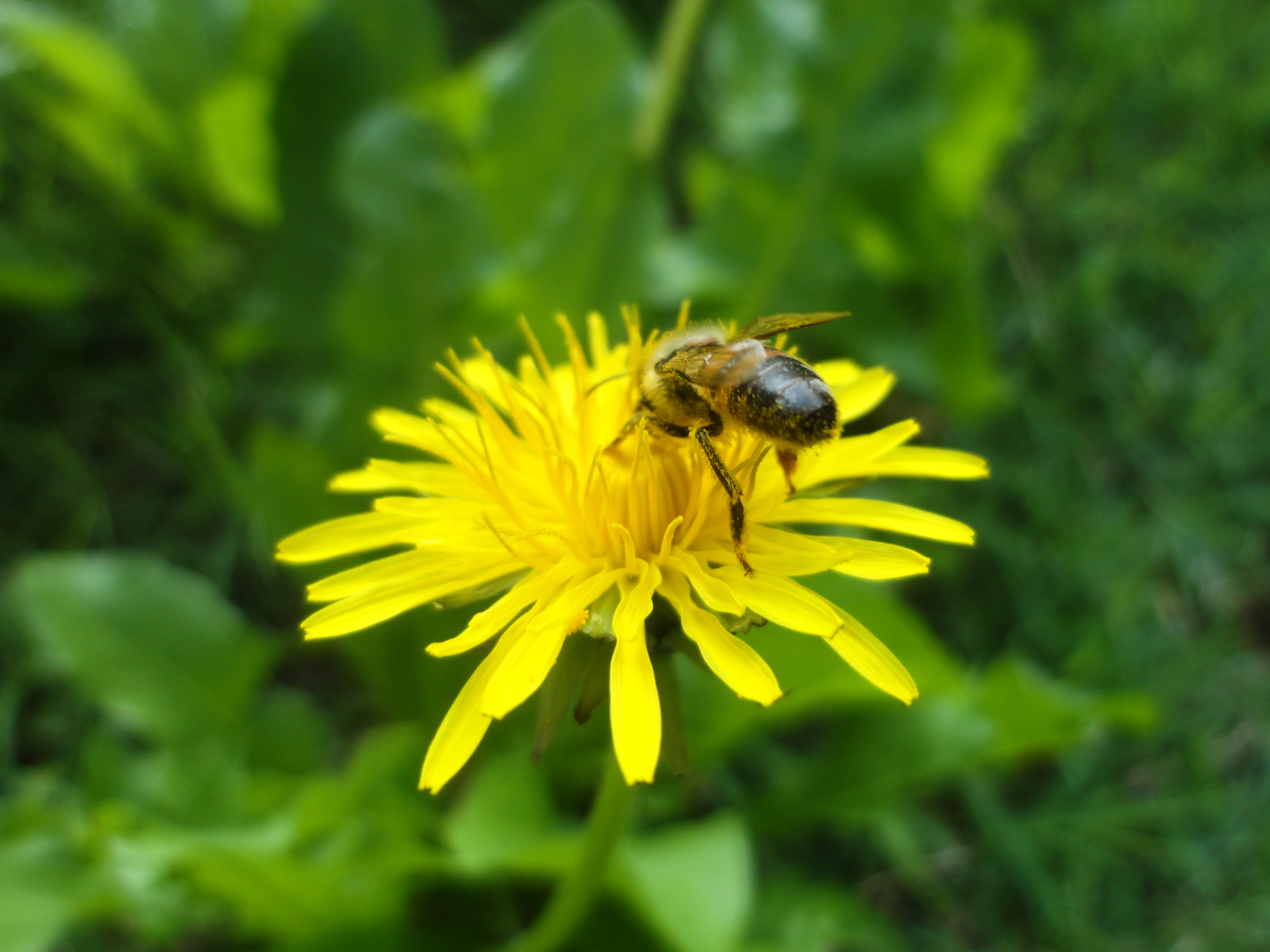
Pollinators provide essential ecosystem services.

Agriculture is a transformative process to any habitat, with a main focus on cultivating crops for human consumption. Views on ecosystem services can be presented through viewpoints that benefit humans environmentally, economically, and culturally to motivate the practices that support ecosystem services in the agricultural industry. For example, low crop diversity can increase pests and their resistance to pesticides, resulting in large ecological disturbances and economical losses. This can be mitigated with increased crop rotation, which contributes to more diverse soil microbiota and insects that provide ecosystem services. These mass flowering crops also provide pulses of resources to generalist pollinators, including honey bees. Another example is the conservation of pollinators such as honeybees that can contribute to the agricultural industry, where contributing to the increase of pollinators is reciprocated with increased crop production.

== See also ==
- Agroecology
