= United Nations Declaration on the Rights of Peasants =

Declaration adopted in 2018 by the United Nations General Assembly

UN General Assembly Resolution 73/165
- Date: 17 December 2018
- Meeting no.: 55th meeting
- Code: A/RES/73/165 (Document)
- Subject: Human rights
- Voting summary: 121 voted for; 8 voted against; 54 abstained; 10 absent
- Result: Adopted

UN GA Third Committee L.30
- Date: 19 November 2018
- Meeting no.: 53rd meeting
- Code: A/C.3/73/L.30 (Document)
- Subject: Human rights
- Voting summary: 119 voted for; 7 voted against; 49 abstained
- Result: Adopted

UN Human Rights Council HRC/39/12
- Date: 28 September 2018
- Meeting no.: 40th meeting
- Code: A/HRC/RES/39/12 (Document)
- Subject: Human rights
- Voting summary: 33 voted for; 3 voted against; 11 abstained
- Result: Adopted

The Declaration on the Rights of Peasants (UNDROP; full title: United Nations Declaration on the Rights of Peasants and Other People Working in Rural Areas) is a United Nations General Assembly resolution on human rights with "universal understanding", adopted by the United Nations in 2018. The resolution was passed by a vote of 121-8, with 54 members abstaining and 10 absent.

The declaration lays down a series of rights for peasants, and has often been seen as complementing the UN Declaration on the Rights of Indigenous Peoples.

== History ==
=== Background ===
In 2008, the Declaration of Rights of Peasants – Women and Men was launched by la Via Campesina which, with support from other civil society organizations, presented it to the United Nations' Human Rights Council.

The text was then used as a basis from 2009 to 2018 to negotiate the text of the final UNDROP Declaration. The negotiations were supported by civil society groups such as La Via Campesina, FIAN International, or the Europe–Third World Centre (CETIM), but also by academics such as the Peasants Rights group of the Geneva Academy of International Humanitarian Law and Human Rights, and several UN Special Rapporteurs.

=== Farmers' rights ===
The concept of peasants' rights build over the farmers' rights recognized, among others, in FAO's Plant Treaty and in the Convention on Biological Diversity.

=== Negotiations of the text ===
==== Launch ====
The negotiations, initially led by Bolivia, were initiated by the UN Human Rights Council and ultimately adopted by the United Nations General Assembly.

==== Human Rights Council ====
On 28 September 2018, draft resolution A/HRC/39/L.16 was presented to the United Nations Human Rights Council, supported by Algeria, Bolivia, Cuba, Ecuador, El Salvador, Egypt, Haiti, Kenya, Nicaragua, Paraguay, Philippines, South Africa, Togo, Venezuela and the State of Palestine.

It was subsequently adopted with 33 votes in favour, 11 abstentions (Belgium, Brazil, Croatia, Germany, Iceland, Japan, Republic of Korea, Slovakia, Slovenia and Spain) and 3 against (Australia, Hungary and the United Kingdom) as HRC Resolution 39/12

==== General Assembly's Third Committee ====
On 24 October, the UN General Assembly's Third Committee held an open-ended intergovernmental working group was held to discuss the draft UNDROP, where comments were made by the representatives of Bolivia, Indonesia, the European Union, Cuba and South Africa. The draft Resolution (A/C.3/73/L.30) was presented to the UN General Assembly's Third Committee on 8 November by the representative of Bolivia with co-sponsor from Cuba, Ecuador, El Salvador, Mongolia, Nicaragua, Paraguay, Portugal, South Africa and Venezuela.

On 19 November, the draft gained support from Benin, the Central African Republic, Chad, Dominican Republic, Egypt, Eritrea, Guinea, Indonesia, Iran, Kazakhstan, Kenya, Liberia, Mali, Niger, Nigeria, Pakistan, Saint Kitts and Nevis, Saint Vincent and the Grenadines, Sierra Leone, Somalia, South Sudan, Uganda, the United Republic of Tanzania, Zambia and Zimbabwe. It was subsequently submitted to vote, which result was positive: with 119 votes in favour, 7 votes against (Australia, Hungary, Israel, New Zealand, Sweden, United Kingdom, United States of America) and 49 abstentions

==== General Assembly 73rd Plenary Session ====
At its 55th plenary meeting on 17 December 2018, the Seventy-third session of the United Nations General Assembly adopted its Resolution 73/165, containing the UNDROP as an annexe, and which introduction reads:

The General Assembly,

Welcoming the adoption by the Human Rights Council, in its resolution 39/12 of 28 September 2018,1 of the United Nations Declaration on the Rights of Peasants and Other People Working in Rural Areas,

1. Adopts the United Nations Declaration on the Rights of Peasants and Other People Working in Rural Areas, as contained in the annexe to the present resolution;
2. Invites Governments, agencies and organizations of the United Nations system and intergovernmental and non-governmental organizations to disseminate the Declaration and to promote universal respect and understanding thereof;
3. Requests the Secretary-General to include the text of the Declaration in the next edition of Human Rights: A Compilation of International Instruments.

Before the adoption, the representative of Switzerland (one of the few non-developing countries that votes favourably) declared about the UNDROP that it "seeks to summarize the rights of peasants in a single document in order to better raise awareness about their situation. It is a very important political signal."

The countries that voted in favour were Afghanistan, Algeria, Angola, Antigua and Barbuda, Azerbaijan, Bahamas, Bahrain, Bangladesh, Barbados, Belarus, Belize, Benin, Bhutan, Bolivia, Botswana, Brunei, Burundi, Cape Verde, Cambodia, Central African Republic, Chad, Chile, Comoros, Congo, Costa Rica, Cuba, Democratic Republic of the Congo, Djibouti, Dominica, Dominican Republic, East Timor, Ecuador, Egypt, El Salvador, Eritrea, Gabon, Gambia, Ghana, Grenada, Guinea, Guinea-Bissau, Guyana, Haiti, India, Indonesia, Iran, Iraq, Ivory Coast, Jamaica, Jordan, Kazakhstan, Kenya, Kuwait, Kyrgyzstan, Laos, Lebanon, Liberia, Libya, Luxembourg, Madagascar, Malawi, Malaysia, Maldives, Mali, Mauritania, Mauritius, Mexico, Moldova, Monaco, Mongolia, Morocco, Mozambique, Myanmar, Namibia, Nepal, Nicaragua, Niger, Nigeria, North Korea, Oman, Pakistan, Panama, Papua New Guinea, Peru, Philippines, Portugal, Qatar, Rwanda, Saint Kitts and Nevis, Saint Lucia, Saint Vincent and the Grenadines, São Tomé and Príncipe, Saudi Arabia, Senegal, Serbia, Seychelles, Sierra Leone, Solomon Islands, Somalia, South Africa, South Sudan, Sri Lanka, Sudan, Suriname, Switzerland, Syria, Tajikistan, Thailand, Togo, Trinidad and Tobago, Tunisia, Uganda, United Arab Emirates, Tanzania, Uruguay, Uzbekistan, Venezuela, Vietnam, Yemen, Zambia and Zimbabwe.

Notably, Australia, Guatemala, Hungary, Israel, New Zealand, Sweden, the United Kingdom and the United States voted against the declaration.

The countries that abstained were Albania, Andorra, Argentina, Armenia, Austria, Belgium, Bosnia and Herzegovina, Brazil, Bulgaria, Cameroon, Canada, Colombia, Croatia, Cyprus, the Czech Republic, Denmark, Estonia, Ethiopia, Fiji, Finland, France, Georgia, Germany, Greece, Honduras, Iceland, Ireland, Italy, Japan, Kiribati, Latvia, Lesotho, Liechtenstein, Lithuania, Malta, Montenegro, the Netherlands, North Macedonia, Norway, Palau, Poland, South Korea, Romania, Russia, Samoa, San Marino, Singapore, Slovakia, Slovenia, Spain, Turkey, Tuvalu, Ukraine, and Vanuatu.

== Contents ==
=== Preamble ===
The preamble recalls a series of human rights instruments, in particular:

- the Charter of the United Nations,
- the Universal Declaration of Human Rights,
- the Convention on the Elimination of All Forms of Racial Discrimination,
- the Covenant on Economic, Social and Cultural Rights,
- the Covenant on Civil and Political Rights,
- the Convention on the Elimination of All Forms of Discrimination against Women,
- the Convention on the Rights of the Child,
- the International Convention on the Rights of Migrants,
- relevant conventions of the International Labour Organization,
- the Declaration on the Right to Development,
- the Declaration on the Rights of Indigenous Peoples,

It also mentions the 2030 Agenda for Sustainable Development, as well as relevant international law, such as:

- the Plant Treaty (ITPGRFA),
- the Convention on Biological Diversity
- and its Nagoya Protocol on Access to Genetic Resources and the Fair and Equitable Sharing of Benefits Arising from their Use,
- FAO's Voluntary Guidelines on the Responsible Governance of Tenure of Land, Fisheries and Forests in the Context of National Food Security,
- FAO's Voluntary Guidelines for Securing Sustainable Small-Scale Fisheries in the Context of Food Security and Poverty Eradication
- FAO's Voluntary Guidelines to Support the Progressive Realization of the Right to Adequate Food in the Context of National Food Security,

=== Article 1, 2, 27 and 28: general provisions ===
Article 1 defines basic concepts, Articles 2 and 28 focus on the general obligations of countries, and Article 27 lists the responsibility of the United Nations system and other intergovernmental organizations.

=== Article 3: equality ===
Article 3 introduces the concept of equality and non-discrimination among peasants and other people working in rural areas.

=== Article 4: women ===
Article 4 recalls the major role of women in rural agricultural settings, and calls for zero discrimination against women, sound gender balance, and women's participation and involvement at all levels.

=== Articles 5 and 18: right to nature ===
Article 5 focuses on the right for peasants to access natural resources, including genetic resources, and to enjoy the means for development, and in particular sustainable development. Article 18 complements it by granting the specific rights to a clean, safe, and healthy environment for all people working and living in rural areas.

=== Articles 6, 7, 8 and 9: liberties and civil and political rights ===
This part of the Declaration addresses the Right to Life, security of persons but also the Freedom of Movement, freedom of thought, opinion and expression, as well as the freedom of Association

=== Article 10, 11 and 12: justice ===
Article 10, 11 and 12 focus on the Right to Participation, the Right to Information, and the Right to Justice, including access to justice, fair treatment, as well as right to a remedy and reparation in case of violations of the peasants' rights.

=== Article 13, 14 and 16: labour rights ===
These two articles address the right to work and the right to work in a safe and healthy environment, with appropriate labour conditions. Article 16 is complementary, and focuses on the right to a decent income, on the right to choose and maintain one's livelihood, and the means of production chosen.

=== Article 15: food sovereignty ===
Article 15 explores one of the main asks of peasants movements through the years: the right to food, food security and food sovereignty.

=== Article 19: right to seeds ===
Article 19 focuses on issues related to the seed sovereignty movement.

=== Articles 22 and 23: right to health and social security ===
This article builds on the right of everyone to the enjoyment of the highest attainable standard of physical and mental health (right to health), and includes specific elements such as a reference to traditional medicine.

=== Article 26: cultural rights, traditional knowledge and traditional cultural expressions ===
This article focuses on socio-cultural aspects, in particular traditional knowledge and traditional cultural heritage.

== See also ==
=== Internal links ===
- Human rights
- United Nations Human Rights Council
- Indigenous rights
- Right to food
- FAO's Plant Treaty (ITPGRFA)
- Peasant movement
- Via Campesina
- United Nations Decade of Family Farming
