= Peasant movement =

Social movement of farm workers or small landholders

A peasant movement is a social movement involved with the agricultural policy, which claims peasants rights.

Peasant movements have a long history that can be traced to the numerous peasant uprisings that occurred in various regions of the world throughout human history. Early peasant movements were usually the feudal and semi-feudal societies, and resulted in violent uprisings. More recent movements, fitting the definitions of social movements, are usually much less violent, and their demands are centered on better prices for agricultural produce, better wages and working conditions for the agricultural laborers, and increasing the agricultural production.

In Colonial India, the economic policies of European merchants and planters during the period Company rule adversely affected the peasant class, protecting the landlords and money lenders while they exploited the peasants. The peasants rose in revolt against economic on many occasions. The peasants in Bengal formed a trade union and revolted against the compulsion of cultivating indigo.

Anthony Pereira, a political scientist, has defined a peasant movement as a "social movement made up of peasants (small landholders or farm workers on large farms), usually inspired by the goal of improving the situation of peasants in a nation or territory".

== Peasant movements by country or region ==
=== India ===
Several peasant movement in India arose during the colonial era, when economic policies by various British colonial administrations led to the decline of traditional handicraft industries. These policies lead to change of ownership in lands, land overcrowding, increased debt among the peasant classes of India. This led to peasant uprisings during the colonial period, and development of peasant movements in the post-colonial period. The Kisan (farmer) Sabha movement started in Bihar under the leadership of Swami Sahajanand Saraswati, who formed the Bihar Provincial Kisan Sabha (BPKS) in 1929 to mobilise peasant grievances against the zamindari attacks on their occupancy rights. In 1938, the crops in Eastern Khandesh were destroyed due to heavy rains. The peasants were ruined. In order to get the land revenue waived, Sane Guruji organized meetings and processions in many places and took out marches to the Collector's office. The peasants joined the revolutionary movement of 1942 in great numbers. Gradually the peasant movement intensified and spread across the rest of India. All these radical developments on the peasant front culminated in the formation of the All India Kisan Sabha (AIKS) at the Lucknow session of the Indian National Congress in April 1936 with Swami Sahajanand Saraswati elected as its first President. In the subsequent years, the movement was increasingly dominated by Socialists and Communists as it moved away from the Congress, by 1938 Haripura session of the Congress, under the presidency of Netaji Subhas Chandra Bose, the rift became evident, and by May 1942, the Communist Party of India, which was finally legalised by the then government in July 1942, had taken over AIKS, all across India including Bengal where its membership grew considerably.

D. D. Kosambi and R.S. Sharma, together with Daniel Thorner, brought peasants into the study of Indian history for the first time.

=== Poland ===
Polish peasant movement focused on improvements in the life of Polish peasants, and empowering them in politics. It was strong from mid-19th to mid-20th centuries. Despite relatively low support on national level, the Polish People's Party maintains somewhat strong position in many local parliaments.

=== United States ===
The farmers' movement was, in American political history, the general name for a movement between 1867 and 1896. In this movement, there were three periods, popularly known as the Grange, Alliance and Populist movements.

=== Zimbabwe ===
The struggle for the Liberation of Zimbabwe is a theme that has been accorded fair autobiographical attention in Zimbabwe. Scholarly attention on the war was predicated on the need to understand how the "underdog" freedom fighters managed to paralyse the state-funded Rhodesian armed forces. In this light, the widely accepted view came to be that the "guerrillas" / freedom fighters established rapport with the peasants during the course of the war. Nevertheless, there is an anti-thesis between nationalist and revisionist scholarly interpretation on the matter. The nationalist historians advance a glorious interpretation of the role of peasants by arguing that there was a correlation between the guerrillas' Maoist ideology of relying on mass support to win a war and the peasants' grievances in the white colonial state. They justify this claim by rationalizing that the peasants had long developed a spirit of resentment prior to guerrilla infiltration in their areas, thus, when the guerrillas came, their ideas fell on fertile ground. Contrary to the glorious interpretation, revisionist historians have reasoned that it is misleading to suggest that the peasants always supported the guerrillas out of will since such a position ignores other critical issues such as guerrilla indiscipline, local struggles in the communities and guerrilla coercion as a means for mobilizing the masses. It is a fact to argue that the guerrilla war thrived on the masses’ co-operation.

== See also ==
- Environmental movement
- Guangzhou Peasant Movement Institute
- Land reform
- Via Campesina
- United Nations Declaration on the Rights of Peasants
