= Musso (surname) =

Munawar Musso (1897–1948) was an Indonesian politician. Other people with the surname Musso include:

- Braulio Musso (1930–2025), Chilean footballer
- Carlo Musso, emergency physician working in the American state of Georgia
- Cornelio Musso (or Cornelius) (1511–1574), Italian Friar Minor Conventual and Bishop of Bitonto
- Franco Musso (born 1974), Argentine photographer
- George Musso (1910–2000), American football lineman
- Guillaume Musso (born 1974), French writer
- Johnny Musso (born 1950), American football player
- Juan Musso (born 1994), Argentine football player
- Luigi Musso (1924–1958), Italian racing driver
- Maria Musso (1931–2024), Italian athlete
- Mason Musso (born 1989), American singer-songwriter and musician
- Mitchel Musso (born 1991), American actor
- Nélida Mercedes Musso (1929–1999), Argentine vedette better known as "Nélida Roca"
- Niccolò Musso (active 1618), Italian painter
- Paul Musso (1931–2021), French sports shooter
- Vido Musso (1913–1982), Italian-born jazz tenor saxophonist, clarinetist and bandleader

== See also ==
- Benito Mussolini (1883–1945), fascist Italian dictator, sometimes referred to by the truncation of his last name
- Musso (disambiguation)
- Muso (disambiguation)
