= Food sovereignty =

Food system

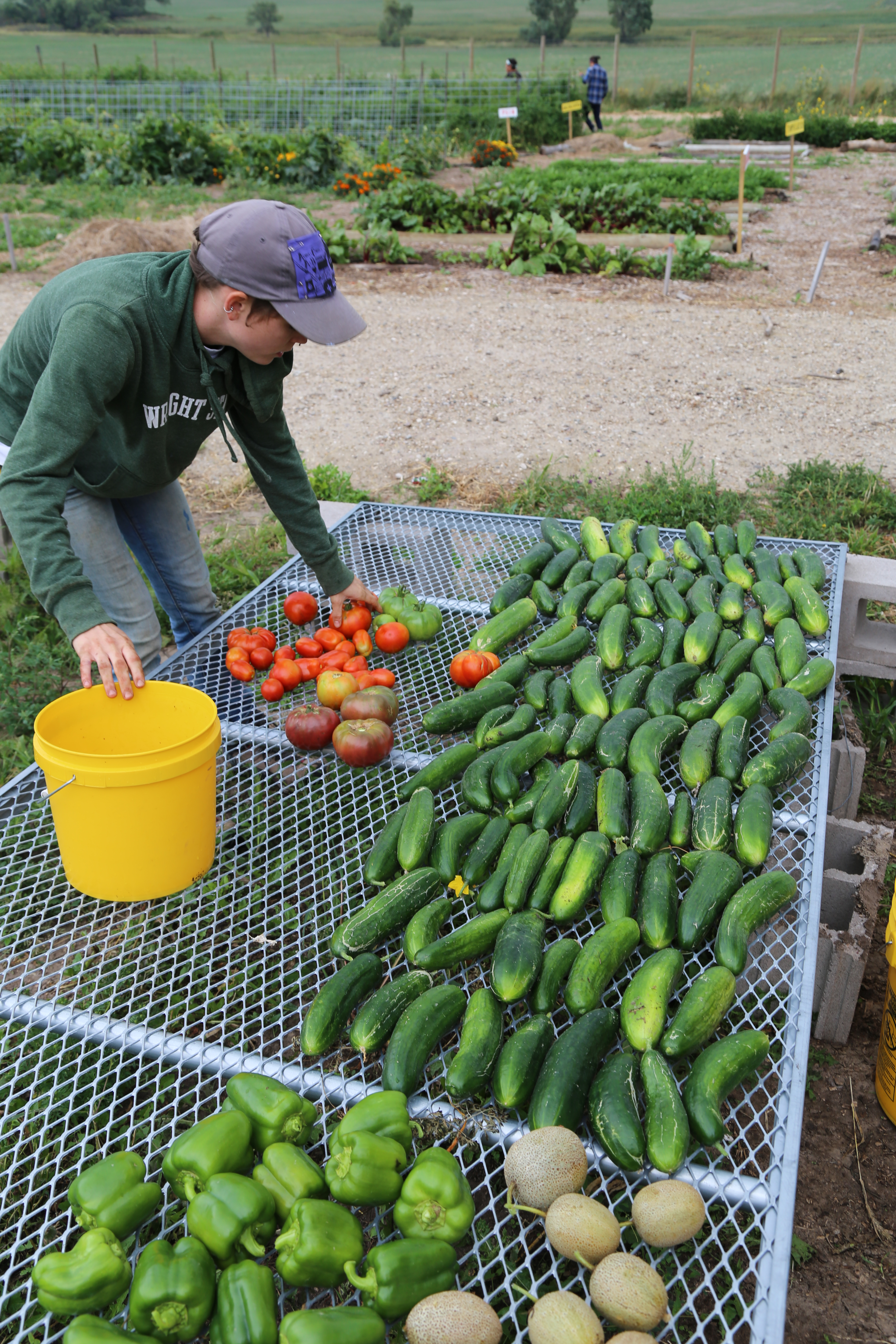
Rosebud Reservation Harvest Produce from a garden in Rosebud Indian Reservation, South Dakota in 2019.

Food sovereignty is the idea that people should have control over their own food systems, including how food is produced, distributed, and consumed. It focuses on local control, sustainability, and culturally appropriate food practices, especially for small-scale farmers and Indigenous communities. Food sovereignty is often compared to food security, but the two are different. While food security focuses on access to enough food, food sovereignty focuses on who controls the food system and how that food is produced. The concept is also closely tied to global political and economic systems, as it challenges corporate control over agriculture and promotes more equitable distribution of resources.

This also includes key areas such as Indigenous food sovereignty global policies, and criticisms of the movement. Indigenous communities are especially impacted due to historical disruptions of their food systems through colonization, which has led to long-term health and economic consequences. Food sovereignty has been adopted into policies in several countries, showing its growing influence globally.

== Definition ==
The term "food sovereignty" was first coined in 1996 by members of Via Campesina, an international farmers' organisation, and later adopted by several international organisations, including the World Bank and United Nations. In 2007, the "Declaration of Nyéléni" provided a definition which was adopted by 80 countries; in 2011 it was further refined by countries in Europe. As of 2020, at least seven countries had integrated food sovereignty into their constitutions and laws.

Unlike traditional approaches to food systems, food sovereignty emphasizes local decision-making, environmental sustainability, and cultural relevance. It also highlights the importance of farmer autonomy and equitable access to land and resources.

== History ==
Aligned somewhat with the tenets of the Slow Food organization, the history of food sovereignty as a movement is relatively young. However, the movement is gaining traction as more countries take significant steps towards implementing food systems that address inequities.

=== Global gatherings ===
At the 2007 Forum for Food Sovereignty in Sélingué, Mali, 500 delegates from more than 80 countries adopted the "Declaration of Nyéléni", which says in part:

Food sovereignty is the right of peoples to healthy and culturally appropriate food produced through ecologically sound and sustainable methods, and their right to define their own food and agriculture systems. It puts those who produce, distribute and consume food at the heart of food systems and policies rather than the demands of markets and corporations. It defends the interests and inclusion of the next generation. It offers a strategy to resist and dismantle the current corporate trade and food regime, and directions for food, farming, pastoral and fisheries systems determined by local producers. Food sovereignty prioritises local and national economies and markets and empowers peasant and family farmer-driven agriculture, artisanal fishing, pastoralist-led grazing, and food production, distribution and consumption based on environmental, social and economic sustainability.

In April 2008 the International Assessment of Agricultural Science and Technology for Development (IAASTD), an intergovernmental panel under the sponsorship of the United Nations and the World Bank, adopted the following definition: "Food sovereignty is defined as the right of peoples and sovereign states to democratically determine their own agricultural and food policies."

=== Government food sovereignty policy ===
Issues of food production, distribution and access are seldom apolitical or without criticism. For example, the adoption of the Green Revolution in countries across the globe has increased world food production but has not "solved" the problem of world hunger. Food sovereignty advocates argue this is because the movement did not address access to land or distribution of economic power. Others argue that food sovereignty is based on incorrect baseline assumptions around the role of subsistence farming in government policy. Agrarian aspects of food sovereignty put the movement in conflict with globalisation, industrialisation, and urbanisation trends.

After Hugo Chávez was elected president of Venezuela in 1998, a new constitution was approved by the people of Venezuela which included the right to food as one of its basic civil rights. The government set up missions to deliver the various constitutional rights. Several missions related to food and farming were established by Chávez' government to provide equitable food access. Among these were the Misión Alimentación, Misión Vuelvan Caras, Misión Mercal and Misión Zamora. Later the Gran Misión AgroVenezuela was created to increase domestic agricultural production. Among the strategies used to increase food sovereignty for Venezuelans were land reform, agroecology, use of traditional crops and biological pest control and the establishment of subsidised food outlets such as Arepera Socialista, Café Venezuela and Cacao Venezuela.

In September 2008, Ecuador enshrined food sovereignty in its constitution. As of late 2008, a law is in the draft stages that is expected to expand upon this constitutional provision by banning genetically modified organisms, protecting many areas of the country from extraction of non-renewable resources, and to discourage monoculture. The law as drafted will also protect biodiversity as collective intellectual property and recognize the Rights of Nature.

Since then Mali, Bolivia, Nepal, Senegal and Egypt (2014 Constitution) have integrated food sovereignty into their national constitutions or laws.

== Indigenous food sovereignty ==
=== Global Issues ===
==== Climate ====
Climate change is impacting the food security of indigenous communities as well, including Pacific Islanders and those in the Circumpolar North, due to rising sea levels or erosion.

==== Cuisine ====
Activists claim that native food sovereignty is also appropriated as a cuisine for mainstream dining because indigenous foods are framed to be culturally authentic, desired by those outside of these communities. Ingredients that are cultural staples, which are harder for these populations to find, are displaced due to a greater demand for access outside of indigenous populations.

=== Indigenous food sovereignty in the United States ===
Native Americans have been directly impacted in their ability to acquire and prepare their food and this disruption of traditional diets has resulted in health problems, including diabetes and heart disease. Indigenous food sovereignty activists in the United States assert that the systematic displacement of indigenous communities has led to mass food insecurity. Activist groups advocate for revitalization of traditional practices, development of local food economies, the right to food, and seed sovereignty.

Indigenous people's food sovereignty and food security are closely related to their geographical location. Traditional indigenous foodways in the United States are tied to the ancestral homelands of Native American populations, especially for those with strong subsistence traditions. For instance, it is taught among the Muckleshoot that "the land that provides the foods and medicines we need are a part of who we are."

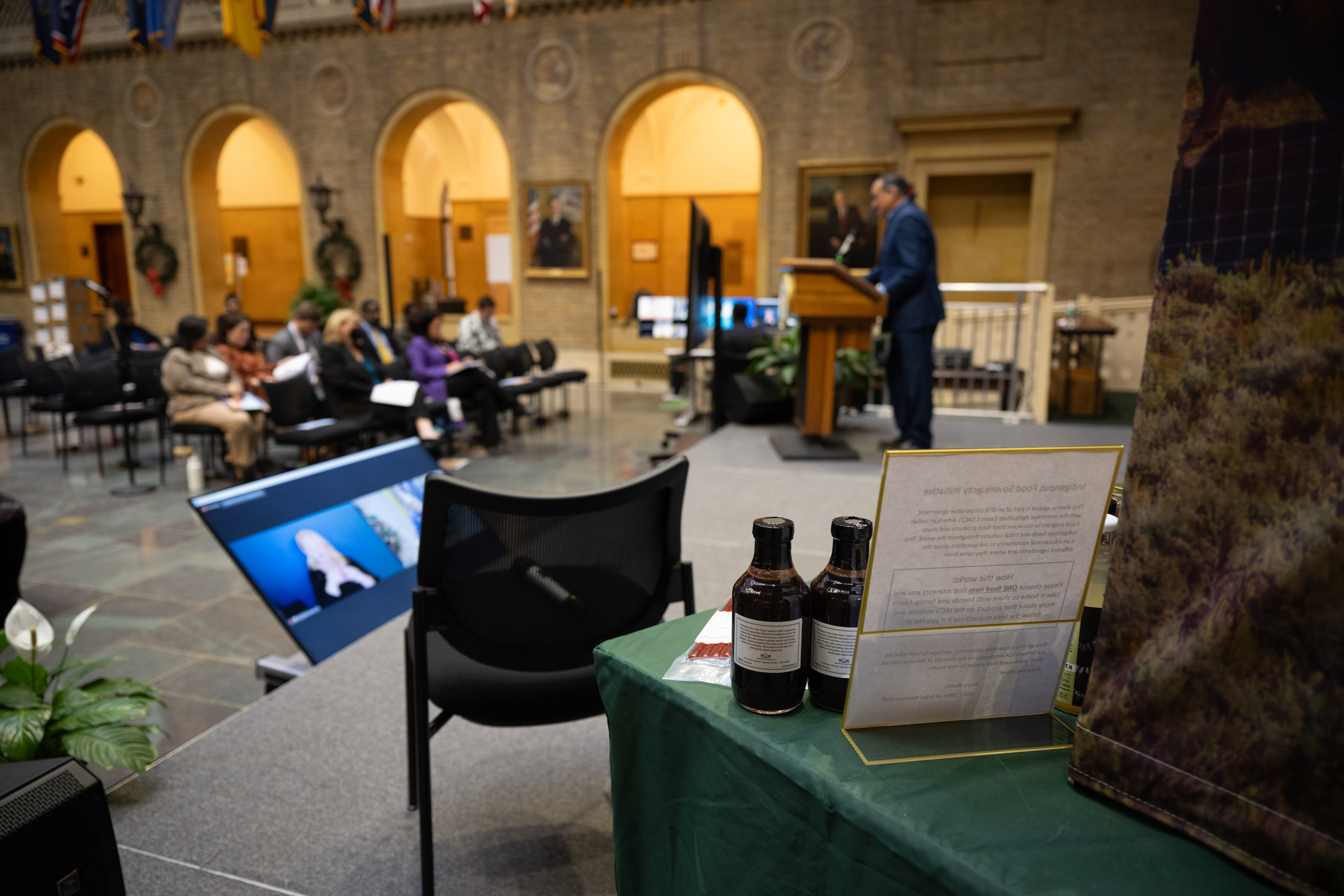
Tepary Beans and Food Sovereignty This image was taken from at the USDA Native American Heritage Month Observance event on Nov. 16, 2023. There were bags of white tepary beans (s-totoah bavī) from Romona Farms American Indian Foods were placed under each participants chairs to promote food sovereignty.

The disruption of traditional foodways is described to be tied to the disruption of the connection between traditional Native land and their people, a change Rachel V. Vernon describes as being tied to "racism, colonialism, and the loss of autonomy and power." Pre-colonial lands were expansive and thriving with traditional foods. Because of disease and war, Native peoples in the early 20th century were directly impacted in their ability to acquire and prepare their food. In addition to this, relocation away from ancestral lands further limited traditional foodways. Many indigenous people in the United States now live in food deserts. Due to inadequate or inhibited access to food, indigenous peoples suffer disproportionately from food insecurity compared to the rest of the US population. At reservations, the "'highly processed, high sugar, high fat, and processed foods,'" further contributed to health issues in Native populations, leading to indigenous peoples in the United States having the highest rates of diabetes and heart disease in the nation. In addition to this, a majority of Native peoples also live off-reservation, and so are even further removed from traditional foodways.

Because Native American nations are sovereign from the United States, they receive little help in rehabilitating traditional foodways. As defined by the National Congress of American Indians, tribal sovereignty ensures that any decisions about the tribes with regard to their property and citizens are made with their participation and consent. The United States federal government recognizes Native American tribes as separate governments, opposed to "special interest groups, individuals, or ... other type of non-governmental entity."

==== History ====
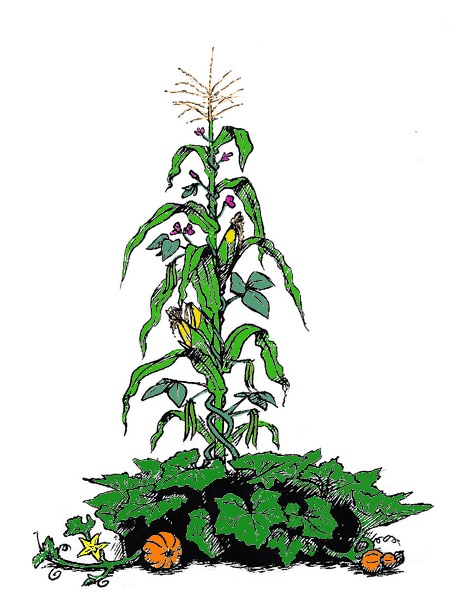
Three sisters: maize, beans, and squash planted together.

Prior to the colonization of the Americas, Native Americans had a diverse diet and food culture, procuring food in various ways across tribes. Depending on the region, Indigenous people sourced their food by hunting, fishing, gathering, and farming. Native food pathways revolved around the "three sisters," or corn, beans, and squash, as staples in their diet. Hunting, gathering, and fishing were the primary means of collecting food.

These balanced ecosystems were disrupted by European settler colonialism following Christopher Columbus reaching America in 1492. Upon European arrival, the Indigenous peoples of America were stripped of their supplies and even starved out as a tactic for colonial control over Native lands. Domesticated animals were introduced into America by European settlers, bringing with them new diseases. Colonizers targeted food stores specifically and drastically changed Native American diets, their ability to acquire resources, and produce food.

New food systems put in place by American settlers, have over time forced a dependency upon processed and mass-produced food on Indian reservations and indigenous communities at large. Native tribes have been forced into a position of food insecurity and put in a place in society where there is no ability to afford other sources of healthy or food that is organically farmed. With a loss of food sovereignty, there was also a loss of land, as Indians were relocated and forcibly assimilated. Following Congress' passing of the Indian Appropriations Act in 1851, all Indigenous people were forced onto Indian reservations, losing the ability to cultivate the earth and rely on traditional means of living.

==== Activism ====
Native Americans today fight for food sovereignty as a means to address health, returning to culturally traditional foods for healing. Returning to traditional eating is challenging, considering an extensive history of relocation and cultural genocide. Many Native American histories of traditional culture foods have been lost or are now difficult to recreate.

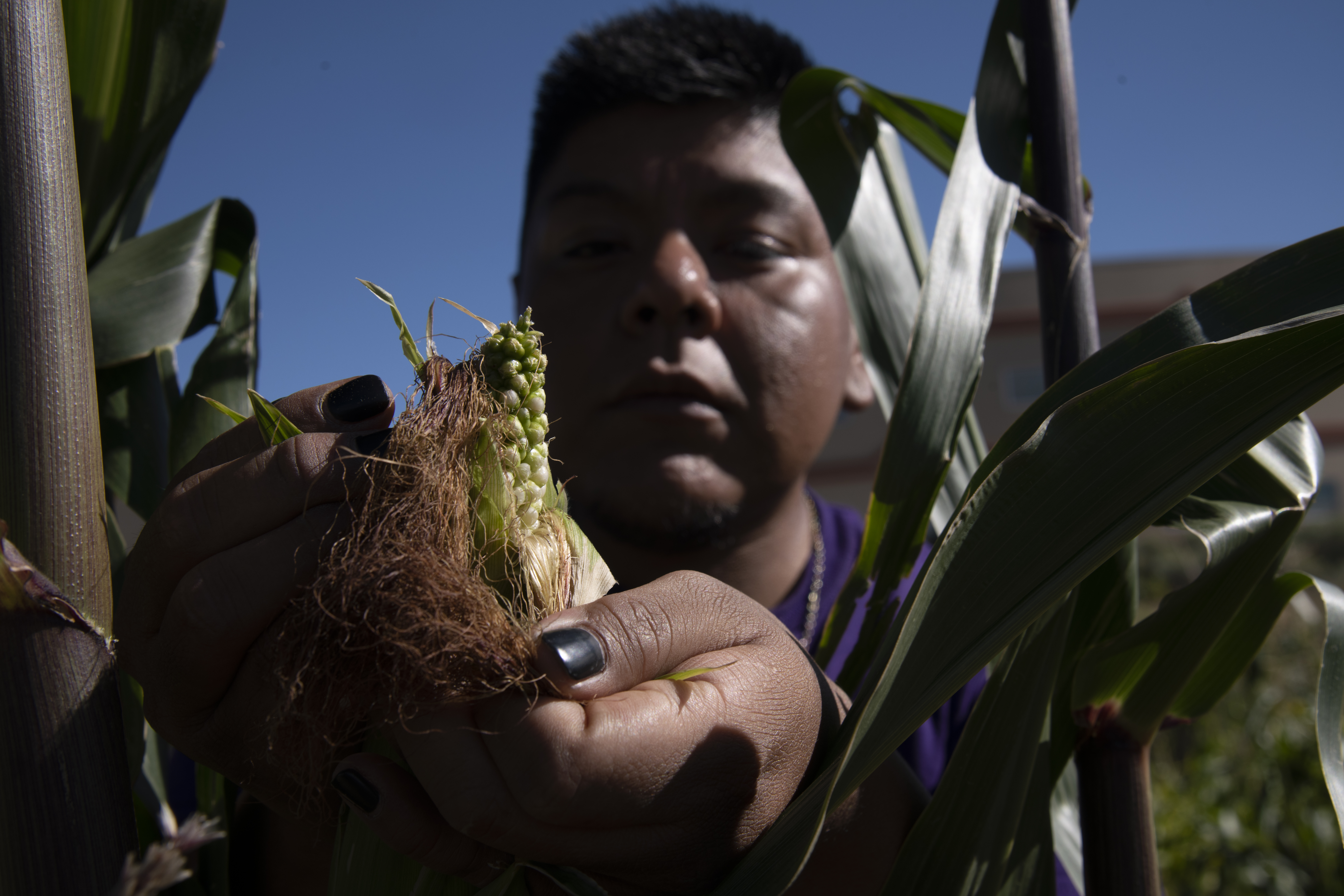
Inspecting Corn Crops in Santa Fe, New Mexico Research assistant Kyle Kootswaytewa inspecting a corn crop in Santa Fe, NM. Directly connecting and caring for land/seeds in an important aspect of food sovereignty.

Indigenous food sovereignty activists in the United States assert that indigenous communities have been systematically displaced from their traditional foodways, which has led to mass food insecurity. It is argued that the most effective way to achieve food security for indigenous groups is to increase their agency in food production. Some activists also argue for food sovereignty as a means of healing historical trauma and as a means of decolonizing their communities. In the United States the Indigenous Food Systems Network and the Native American Food Sovereignty Alliance work towards education and policy-making concerned with food and farming security. Another group focused on requiring food and energy sovereignty is the White Earth Anishnaabeg from Minnesota, who focus on a variety of foods, planting and harvesting them using traditional methods, a form of decolonization. Such groups meet to establish policies for food sovereignty and to develop their local food economies at summits such as the Diné Bich'iiya' Summit in Tsaile, Arizona, which focused on Navajo traditional foods.

Indigenous food sovereignty activists also often advocate for seed sovereignty, and more generally for plant breeders' rights. Seed saving is important to indigenous communities in the United States because it provides those communities with a stable food source and holds cultural importance. In addition, seed sovereignty advocates often argue that seed saving is an important mechanism in creating agricultural systems that can adapt to climate change.

==== Food sovereignty research and projects ====
In 2021, a comprehensive literature review of IFS (Indigenous Food Sovereignty) and the effectiveness of food sovereignty principles concluded that Indigenous people in the United States and Canada have higher rates of obesity, food insecurity, and Type 2 diabetes than the general population.

Government projects supporting indigenous food systems are new attempts to uplift indigenous communities and are in amateur stages of development. Other countries adopted Indigenous food programs years before the U.S., including Canada. The Canadian Food Guide (CFG) was created in January 2019 as a means to include multicultural diets, instead of basing food standards on one or few cultures — the guide includes Indigenous diets and involved Indigenous populations in consultation.

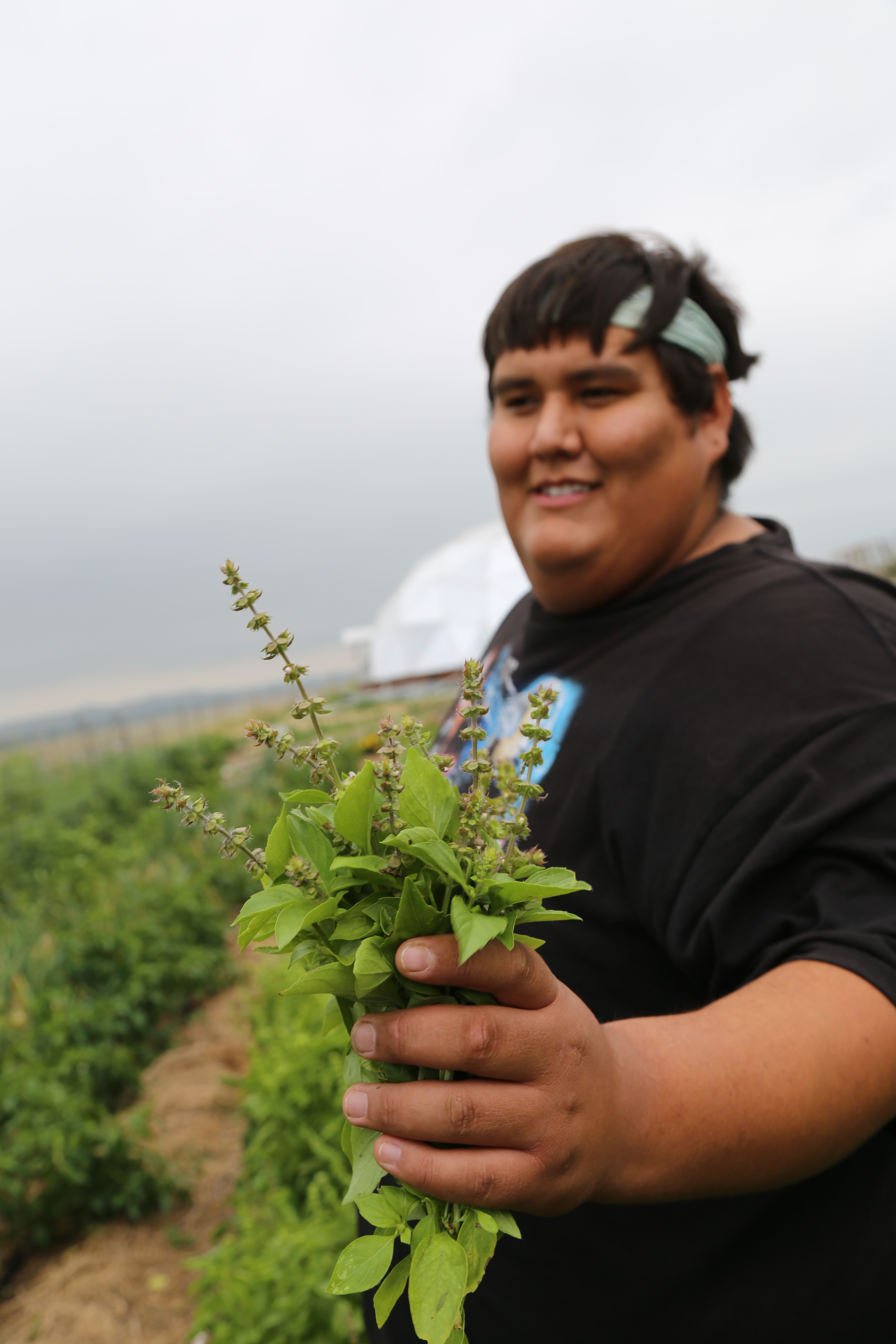
Basil Harvest on Tribal Land in South Dakota A community member harvesting basil from a one-acre self-sustaining farm on an Indian reservation in South Dakota.

In 2021, the United States' Department of Agriculture launched the Indigenous Food Sovereignty Initiative. This initiative is designed to "promote traditional food ways" as, similar to Canada, USDA programs have not historically encompassed Indigenous food pathways and diets. The USDA has partnered with organizations already serving Indigenous tribes: The Indigenous Seed Keepers Network, Linda Black Elk & Lisa Iron Cloud, InterTribal Buffalo Council, North American Traditional Indigenous Food Systems, Intertribal Agriculture Council, and the University of Arkansas - Indigenous Food and Agriculture Initiative.

Non-governmental projects, such as the "Good Life" project in Ecuador, are spearheaded by independent organizations and Indigenous community members. The "Good Life" suggests that there are alternative methods of action through Indigenous community development that do not involve governmental funding or state provisioning. In Ecuador, the Indigenous community has developed the "Good Life" project which drifts away from capitalist and western understandings of what a community needs, and rather focuses on cultivating community success through harmony with the people, nature, and defending their land — essentially working directly within an Indigenous community to reclaim food sovereignty.

Organizations in the United States have adopted similar models to Ecuador's "Good Life" project. In California, the UC Berkeley organization, CARES (the Community Assessment of Renewable Energy and Sustainability) works with the PPN (Pinoleville Pomo Nation) in Ukiah, California, to support their tribal sovereignty. This Indigenous community has been working with CARES over the years to design sustainable housing and energy that reflect its culture.

Narragansett people exercised their own food sovereignty initiative by reappropriating landscapes, seascapes, estuaries, spaces, and built places from a Rhode Island "Farm", which had, in earnest after 1690, sustained southern New England proprietorship, land banks, private libraries, and currency within a Greater Caribbean plantation complex. This carrying trade became a potential leg of the Triangular trade, although historians also argue that the self-contained carrying trade belied the triangle as a sequential circuit. By 1769, the woodlands and wetlands of the Narragansett tribal reserve near Charlestown, Rhode Island, had been reduced to less than five square miles, with multivalent consequences for resource allocation, survivance, race, and the "emotional fellowship" of religiosity. Census and missionary records appraised the reserve population at approximately 600 tribal members, on the eve of Narragansett tribal veterans' return from the Seven Years' War. But these same records did not address the seasonal fishing exodus and indicated that, for example, the Narragansett "have for ages been intermixing with Whites and Blacks...a number of others, of mixed nations, live among them, who, by their customs, are not of the tribe." One missionary later observed that less than a third of the reserve was available for tillage and sustenance, with the remainder devoted to tenancy and the maintenance of woodlands for timber (sales, etc.).

By the mid-eighteenth century, Narragansett peoples increasingly found themselves in debt to these "Farmers." Loans covered gunpowder for hunting sojourns and monetary compensation for black "seasoned slaves", often exhausted after daily field tasks or twilight gang labor, in assisting Narragansett fishermen (and women) with canoeing and navigation. Narragansett peoples increasingly relied on horticulture and agriculture for sustenance in order to stem mounting debts, with limited animal husbandry encompassing a variety of horses and additional draft animals. Historian Daniel Mandell argues that, compared to Eastern Woodland Algonquian communities in similar circumstances, "the Narragansetts had even less: in 1810, the tribe told [congregational missionary Curtis] Coe that they had no oxen to plow their fields or haul manure and held only about four cows; he had already noted that families on the reserve generally farmed only about an acre." Despite the antebellum rise of "Greater Northeast" industrial agriculture, the southern New England "Farms" and the carrying trade in Caribbean sugar, molasses, rice, coffee, indigo, mahogany, and pre-1740 "seasoned slaves", began to dissipate by the Election of 1800 and largely collapsed into agrarian ruins by the War of 1812.

The expansion of the Narragansett tribal project garnered media coverage and incited scholars to reevaluate a diminished focus on, or complete absence of, such "Farms", their proprietors, their multipurpose Pacers, seaport carriers, land banks, and Narragansett foodways in extant studies on Eastern Woodland Algonquian communities and oral history.

== Seed sovereignty ==
Seed sovereignty can be defined as the right "to breed and exchange diverse open-sourced seeds." It is closely connected to food sovereignty, as seed sovereignty activists argue for the practice of seed saving partly as a means of increasing food security. These activists argue that seed saving allows for a closed food system that can help communities gain independence from major agricultural companies. Seed sovereignty is distinct from food sovereignty in its emphasis on seed saving specifically, rather than food systems in their entirety. Seed sovereignty activists often argue for seed saving based on environmental reasoning, not just food justice ones. They argue that seed saving fills an important role of restoring biodiversity to agriculture, and producing plant varieties that are more resilient to change climatic conditions in light of climate change.

== Food sovereignty versus food security ==
=== Food sovereignty ===
Movements to reclaim sovereignty over food have existed around the world for centuries; however, the concept of "food sovereignty" itself emerged in 1996. Food sovereignty was initially defined by "small-scale producers [who] organized as the transnational social movement La Vía Campesina (LVC), and was launched globally at the 1996 United Nations World Food Summit." It is a concept that explains how the industrialization of food pathways has decreased one's freedom to choose one's own food source. "Food sovereignty movements work hard to increase local community control of the production, processing, and distribution of food, as this is seen as a necessary condition for liberating communities from oppression," which has transformed food movements toward building more overall security.

In fall 2003, Peter Rosset argues in Food First's Backgrounder that "food sovereignty goes beyond the concept of food security... [Food security] means that... [everyone] must have the certainty of having enough to eat each day[,] ... but says nothing about where that food comes from or how it is produced." Food sovereignty includes support for smallholders and for collectively owned farms, fisheries, etc., rather than industrializing these sectors in a minimally regulated global economy. In another publication, Food First describes "food sovereignty" as "a platform for rural revitalization at a global level based on equitable distribution of farmland and water, farmer control over seeds, and productive small-scale farms supplying consumers with healthy, locally grown food."

=== Food Security ===
In the 90's the Food and Agriculture Organization defined food security as "all people, at all times, hav[ing] physical, social and economic access to sufficient, safe and nutritious food that meets their dietary needs and food preferences for an active and healthy life." Despite the fact that food security has become more widely understood in the US as availability and access to nutritious foods all the time, this definition is not universally applicable. For instance, in the European Union, "the official food insecurity indicator includes the unaffordability of 'a meal with meat, chicken or fish every second day'" This definition differs greatly from food insecurity measurements of the US for instance. The existence of contradicting markers of food insecurity happening globally reflects different research and interpretations of that research.

Food security, emphasises access to adequate nutrition for all, which may be provided by food from one's own country or from global imports. In the name of efficiency and enhanced productivity, it has therefore served to promote what has been termed the "corporate food regime": large-scale, industrialised corporate farming based on specialized production, land concentration and trade liberalisation. Critics of the food security movement claim that its inattention to the political economy of the corporate food regime blinds it to the adverse effects of that regime, notably the widespread dispossession of small producers and global ecological degradation.

== Criticisms of the Green Revolution ==
The Green Revolution, which refers to developments in plant breeding between the 1960s and 1980s that improved yields from major cereal crops, is upheld by some proponents of food security as a success story in increasing crop yields and combating world hunger. The policy focused primarily in research, development and transfer of agricultural technology, such as hybrid seeds and fertilisers, through massive private and public investment that went into transforming agriculture in a number of countries, starting in Mexico and India. However, many in the food sovereignty movement are critical of the green revolution and accuse those who advocate it as following too much of a Western culture technocratic program that is out of touch with the needs of majority of small producers and peasants.

While the green revolution greatly increased food production and averted famine, world hunger continues because it did not address the problem of access. Food sovereignty advocates argue that the green revolution failed to alter the highly concentrated distribution of economic power, particularly access to land and purchasing power. Critics also argue that the green revolution's increased use of herbicides caused widespread environmental destruction and reduced biodiversity in many areas.

== Academic perspectives ==
=== Food Regime theory ===
According to Philip McMichael, a "world agriculture" under the WTO Agreement on Agriculture ("food from nowhere") represents one pole of the "central contradiction" of the present regime. He is interested in the food sovereignty movement's potential to escalate the tension between this and its opposing pole, the agroecology-based localism ("food from somewhere") advocated by various grassroots food movements. Offering slightly different conclusions, recent work by Harriet Friedmann suggests that "food from somewhere" is already being co-opted under an emergent "corporate-environmental" regime (cf. Campbell 2009).

=== Criticisms ===
==== Wrong baseline assumptions ====
Some scholars argue that the Food Sovereignty movement follows wrong baseline assumptions, citing that small-scale farming is not necessarily a freely chosen lifestyle and farmers in least developed and highly developed countries do not face the same challenges. These critics claim the Food Sovereignty movement may be right about the mistakes of neoliberal economic ideology, but it is silent about the fact that many famines actually occurred under socialist and communist regimes that pursued the goal of food self-sufficiency (cf. Aerni 2011).

There are also debates about whether food sovereignty oversimplifies complex global food issues or overlooks the benefits of technological advancements in agriculture. These critiques highlight the need for balanced discussions about the movement's strengths and limitations.

==== Political-jurisdictional model ====
There is a lack of consensus within the food sovereignty movement regarding the political or jurisdictional community at which its calls for democratisation and renewed "agrarian citizenship" are directed. In public statements, the food sovereignty movement urges strong action from both national governments and local communities (in the vein of the indigenous rights movement, Community-Based Natural Resource Management (CBNRM) . Elsewhere it has also appealed to global civil society to act as a check against abuses by national and supranational governing bodies.

Those who take a radically critical view on state sovereignty would argue against the possibility that national sovereignty can be reconciled with that of local communities (see also the debate about multiculturalism and indigenous autonomy in Mexico ).

==== Crisis of the peasantry? ====
In its strong reassertion of rural and peasant identities, the food sovereignty movement has been read as a challenge to modernist narratives of inexorable urbanisation, industrialisation of agriculture, and de-peasantisation. However, as part of ongoing debates over the contemporary relevance of agrarianism in classical Marxism, Henry Bernstein is critical of these accounts. He claims that such analyses tend to present the agrarian population as a unified, singular and world-historical social category, failing to account for:

- a population's vast internal social differentiation (North/South, gender and class positionalities);
- the conservative, cultural survivalist tendencies of a movement that has emerged as part of a backlash against the perceived homogenising forces of globalisation (Boyer discusses whether food sovereignty is a counter or anti-development narrative) Berstein claims that these accounts cannot escape a certain agrarian populism (or agrarianism). For a response to Bernstein, see McMichael (2009).

== See also ==
- 2007–2008 world food price crisis
- Land grabbing
- Food race
- Permaculture
- United Nations Decade of Family Farming
- United Nations Declaration on the Rights of Peasants

== Literature ==
- Annette Desmarais, Nettie Wiebe, and Hannah Wittman (2010). Food Sovereignty: Reconnecting Food, Nature and Community. Food First Books. ISBN 978-0-935028-37-9
- Choplin, Gérard; Strickner, Alexandra; Trouvé, Aurélie [Hg.] (2011). Food sovereignty - towards a new agricultural and food policy in Europe (Ernährungssouveränität - Für eine andere Agrar- und Lebensmittelpolitik in Europa). Mandelbaum Verlag. ISBN 978-3-85476-346-8
- Vazquez, Jennifer M. (2011). The role of indigenous knowledge and innovation in creating food sovereignty in the Oneida Nation of Wisconsin (MS thesis). Iowa State University.
- Five Acres and Independence
- William Schanbacher (2010). The Politics of Food: The Global Conflict between Food Security and Food Sovereignty
