= Ogobara Doumbo =

Malian medical researcher

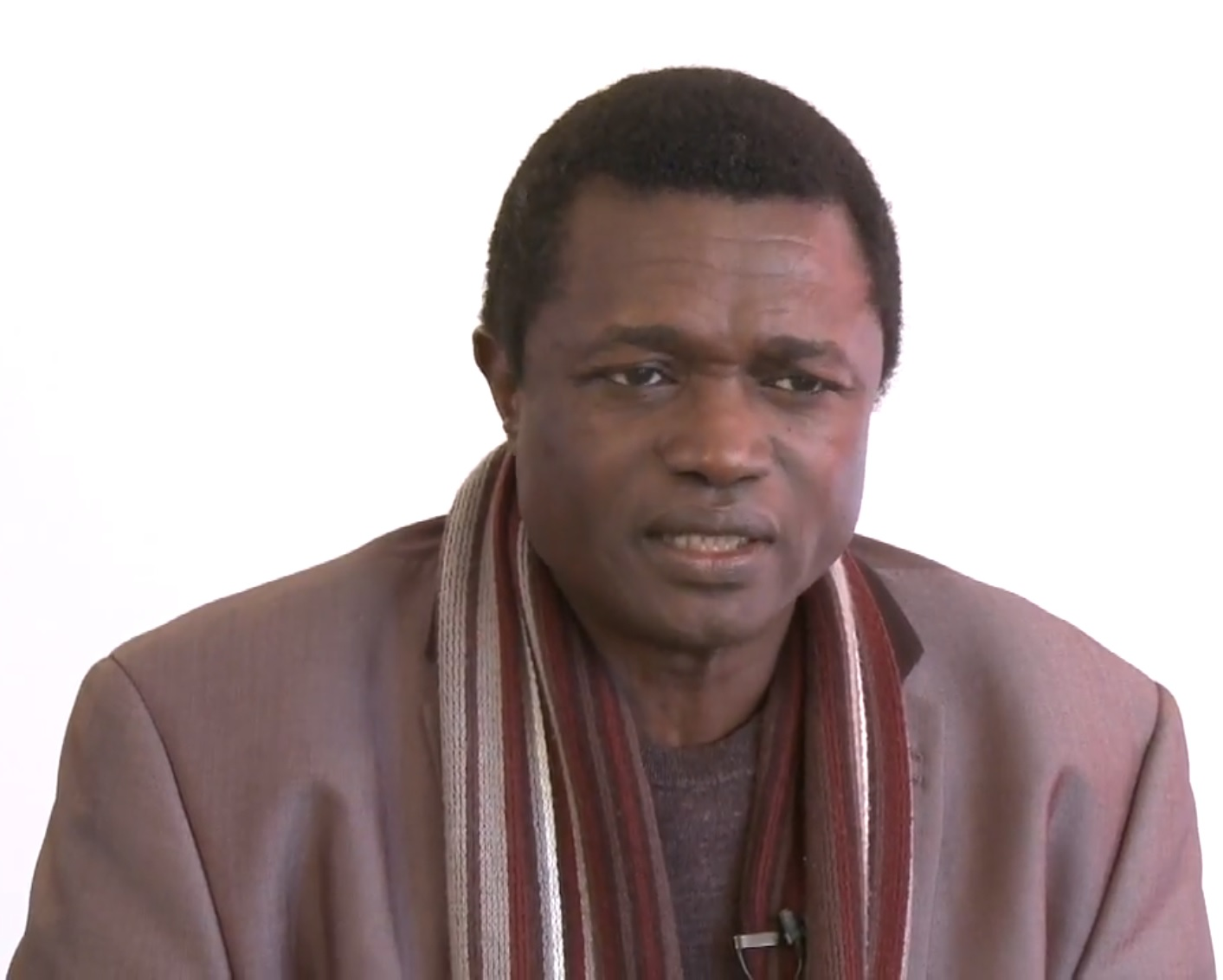
- Doumbo speaks for the GABRIEL network in 2017
- Born: 1 January 1956
- Died: 9 June 2018 (aged 62)
- Education: University of Mali Johns Hopkins University; University of Montpellier Aix-Marseille University
- Awards: Légion d’honneur Ordre National du Mali

Ogobara Doumbo (1 January 1956 – 9 June 2018) was a Malian medical researcher at the University of Mali. He was recognised as a global leader in malaria research. He was the recipient of the Chevalier de l’Ordre National du Mali, Legion d'honneur and research award on Malaria in Africa.

== Early life and education ==
Doumbo grew up in a Dogon village. His father and grandfather were traditional African healers. He first rode in a car as a teenager, travelling 1,000 km to sit his secondary-school certification exams in Bandiagara. He achieved good enough grades at school to win a scholarship for Bamako's National School of Medicine and Pharmacy, and completed an MD in the Faculty of Medicine at the University of Mali. After graduating, he worked as a bush doctor in Sélingué, specialising in surgery. Several locals rejected Western medicine, and alongside performing caesarean section deliveries Doumbo had to prove that Western methods could save lives. He went on to earn master's degrees in parasitology and immunology in the University of Montpellier. He was mentored by Philippe Ranque and Bernard Duflo, who helped him return to Mali during study breaks. He graduated with a Masters in medical anthropology at Aix-Marseille University and a qualification in biostatistics from Johns Hopkins University.

== Research and career ==
In 1992 Doumbo created the Bamako Malaria Research and Training Center with his colleague Yeya Toure. The centre was supported by the government of Mali, the National Institutes of Health, the Rockefeller Foundation and the World Health Organization. Working with Abdoulaye Djimde Doumbo mapped malaria and chloroquine resistance across Mali and ensured government control initiatives were based on evidence. He was visited by Harold E. Varmus in 1996, and travelled with him to remote villages. He supported Djimde in his scientific career, supporting him to getting a PhD at the University of Maryland, Baltimore County. Djimde went on to lead the centre's drug resistance program, and was the first West African person to receive a Howard Hughes grant. The centre works with the health system in villages, installing research units and training local nurses and midwives. It has several research groups led by Malian researchers, over 200 permanent researchers and 60 postgraduate students. He established a grant-administration program, which has attracted significant funding and supported several generations of African researchers. Their efforts demonstrated the need for malarial control tools to be deployed on the ground, which influenced World Health Organization recommendations. Between 1996 and 2001 he directed the Tropical Medical Research Center Program, which was a collaboration between the University of Mali and Tulane University. Doumbo served as Professor in the Epidemiology of Parasitic Diseases at the University of Mali.

Doumbo was the senior investigator for the drug trials of several antimalarials. He was on the health advisory board of Malaria No More and the Board of Directors of Muso Health. He was a member of the SESSTIM Unit at IRD/ Aix Marseille University.

== Honours and awards ==
Doumbo was the recipient of several awards recognising his contributions to malaria and tropical diseases.

1999 – Legion d'honneur

2000 – l’Ordre National du Mali

2007 – Prix Christophe Mérieux de l’Institut de France

2008 – Princess of Asturias Awards

2008 – Alpha Omega Alpha Award

2008 – Elected to Académie Nationale de Médecine

2013 – Inserm International Research award

2016 – International Fellow of American Society of Tropical Medicine
