= Muso =

Muso may refer to:

- Muso (InuYasha), a character in the manga and anime series InuYasha
- Muso, a Thai exonym for the Lahu people
- Muso Health, nonprofit organisation in Mali
- Sello Muso (born 1986), footballer from Lesotho

== See also ==
- Musou (disambiguation), a Japanese word meaning 'The Only One'
- Musso (disambiguation)
