= Self-sustainability =

Not requiring outside inputs to meet needs

Self-sustainability and self-sufficiency are overlapping states of being in which a person, being, or system needs little or no help from, or interaction with others. Self-sufficiency entails the self being enough (to fulfill needs), and a self-sustaining entity can maintain self-sufficiency indefinitely. These states represent types of personal or collective autonomy. A self-sufficient economy is one that requires little or no trade with the outside world and is called an autarky.

== Description ==
Self-sustainability is a type of sustainable living in which nothing is consumed other than what is produced by the self-sufficient individuals. Self-sustainability is a comprehensive approach to sustainable living that extends beyond mere environmental responsibility to encompass economic independence, reduced reliance on major corporations, and minimizing environmental impact through personal actions. Examples of attempts at self-sufficiency in North America include simple living, food storage, homesteading, off-the-grid, survivalism, DIY ethic, and the back-to-the-land movement.

Practices that enable or aid self-sustainability include autonomous building, permaculture, sustainable agriculture, and renewable energy. The term is also applied to limited forms of self-sustainability, for example growing one's own food or becoming economically independent of state subsidies. The self-sustainability of an electrical installation measures its degree of grid independence and is defined as the ratio between the amount of locally produced energy that is locally consumed, either directly or after storage, and the total consumption.

Key self-sustainability practices include:

- Going zero-waste
- Using energy-efficient appliances
- Recycling and using less water (climate dependant)
- Growing your own food
- Producing renewable energy
- Improving mental and physical health
- Practicing financial responsibility

A system is self-sustaining (or self-sufficient) if it can maintain itself by independent effort. The system self-sustainability is:

1. the degree at which the system can sustain itself without external support
2. the fraction of time in which the system is self-sustaining

Self-sustainability is considered one of the "ilities" and is closely related to sustainability and availability. In the economics literature, a system that has the quality of being self-sustaining is also referred to as an autarky.

== Examples ==
=== Mental and Physical Health ===
Self sustainability supports mental and physical well-being. When individuals are self sustaining, it creates a sense of autonomy which gives them purpose. Therefore, this kind of lifestyle can lead an individual to have more of a sense of competence and control, thus boosting both their mental and physical health. Research indicates that higher levels of depressive symptoms actually are associate with lower self sufficiency in daily life. Moreover, self-sufficiency has been linked to improve mental and physical health outcomes.

=== Political states ===
Autarky exists whenever an entity can survive or continue its activities without external assistance. Autarky is not necessarily economic. For example, a military autarky would be a state that could defend itself without help from another country.

=== Labor ===
According to the Idaho Department of Labor, an employed adult shall be considered self-sufficient if the family income exceeds 200% of the Office of Management and Budget poverty income level guidelines.

=== Peer-to-peer swarming ===
In peer-to-peer swarming systems, a swarm is self-sustaining if all the blocks of its files are available among peers (excluding seeds and publishers).

== Discussion ==
=== Self-sustainability and survivability ===
Whereas self-sustainability is a quality of one's independence, survivability applies to the future maintainability of one's self-sustainability and indeed one's existence. Many believe that more self-sustainability guarantees a higher degree of survivability. However, just as many oppose this, arguing that it is not self-sustainability that is essential for survivability, but on the contrary specialization and thus dependence.

Consider the first two examples presented above. Among countries, commercial treats are as important as self-sustainability. An autarky is usually inefficient. Among people, social ties have been shown to be correlated to happiness and success as much as self-sustainability.

=== Greenwashing ===
When making switches towards a more sustainable life, it is important to take note of marketing strategies such as Greenwashing. Companies falsely present their products or practices as environmentally friendly. As more people become conscious of sustainability, some businesses take advantage by branding themselves with misleading terms like:

- "All-natural"
- "Eco-friendly"
- "Non-toxic"
- "Earth-friendly"

== See also ==
- Autarchism
- Cottagecore
- Eating your own dog food
- Five Acres and Independence
- Food sovereignty
- Homesteading
- Individualism
- Juche
- List of system quality attributes
- Localism
- Rugged individualism
- Self-help
- Tiny house movement
- Vegetable farming
- Amish
- Nomad
- Overlanding
- Vanlife
