= Jeremy Fogel =

American judge

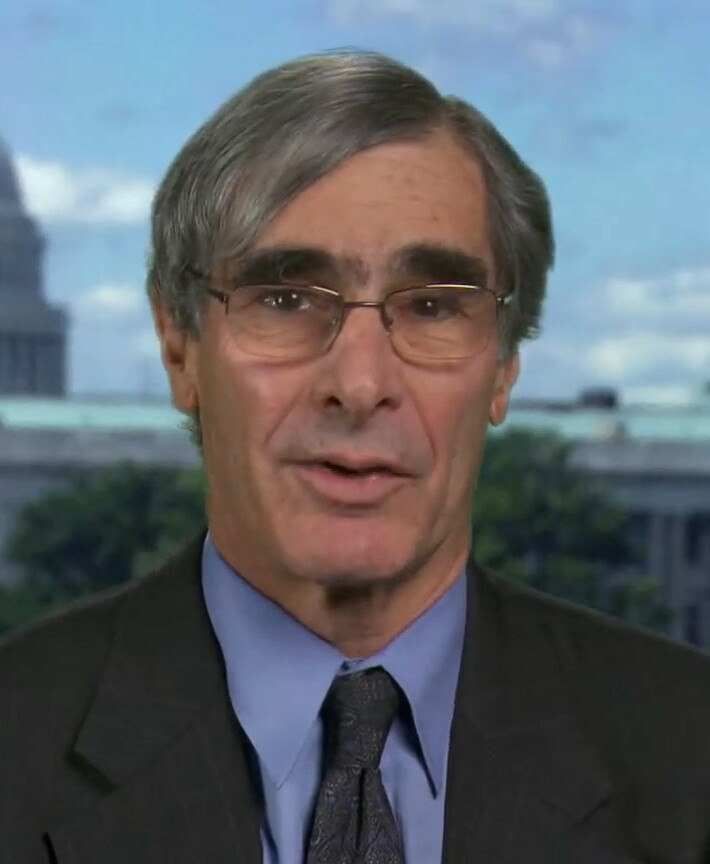
- Fogel in 2017

Senior Judge of the United States District Court for the Northern District of California
- In office December 31, 2014 – September 14, 2018

Judge of the United States District Court for the Northern District of California
- In office March 17, 1998 – December 31, 2014
- Appointed by: Bill Clinton
- Preceded by: Robert Aguilar
- Succeeded by: Seat abolished

Personal details
- Born: Jeremy Don Fogel; September 17, 1949 (age 76) San Francisco, California, U.S.
- Education: Stanford University (BA); Harvard University (JD)

Jeremy Don Fogel (born September 17, 1949) is a former United States district judge of the United States District Court for the Northern District of California. Fogel was appointed by President Bill Clinton. He was a judge for the municipal court and superior court of Santa Clara County, California from 1981 to 1998. He served as Director of the Federal Judicial Center from 2011 to 2018.

== Education and early career ==
Fogel was born in San Francisco, California, and received a Bachelor of Arts degree from Stanford University in 1971 and a Juris Doctor from Harvard Law School in 1974. He entered private practice in San Jose, California until 1978. He was a lecturer in human development at San Jose State University from 1977 to 1978 and member of the Santa Clara County Bar Association from 1978 to 1981. With the Mental Health Advocacy Project, he was a directing attorney from 1978 to 1981 and an Executive director from 1980 to 1981. Along with his judicial work, Fogel lectures at Stanford Law School; one of his courses was "Psychology of Litigation: Practical and Ethical Implications".

== Judicial career ==
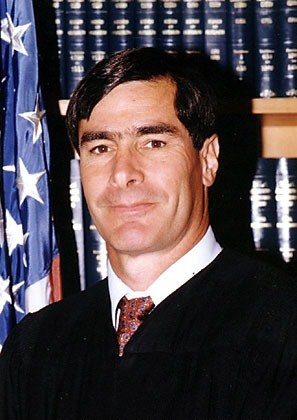
Fogel in 2003

=== State judicial service ===
He was appointed by Democratic governor Jerry Brown as a judge on the Santa Clara County Municipal Court from 1981 to 1986. Brown's successor, Republican governor George Deukmejian, appointed Fogel to a judgeship at the Superior Court of Santa Clara County in 1986; Fogel remained until 1998. As a Superior Court judge, Fogel on November 23, 1992 allowed the East Side Union High School District to screen Channel One News, whose content included commercials, in classrooms provided that students who opt out receive alternative assignments. In 1997, Fogel heard a case challenging Measure B, a ballot initiative for a public transportation sales tax passed by 52 percent of voters. Challengers argued that because Measure B was a special tax (earmarked) rather than a general tax (for the general fund), a simple majority vote was insufficient. Fogel dismissed the lawsuit on April 3, 1997, two days after it opened.

=== Federal judicial service ===
Fogel was nominated by President Bill Clinton on September 8, 1997, to the seat on the United States District Court for the Northern District of California that had been vacated by Robert Aguilar. He was confirmed by the United States Senate on March 16, 1998, and received his commission on March 17, 1998. He assumed senior status on December 31, 2014. He retired from active service on September 14, 2018.

== Notable cases ==
Fogel has presided over federal criminal cases, including trials for perjury and fraud. In 2010, he presided over the perjury case of Federal Bureau of Investigation employee Rachelle Thomas-Zuill, who pleaded guilty. On January 8, 2010, Fogel sentenced two people to federal prison for defrauding 24 Hour Fitness; one of the convicted, Susan Powell, served as a vice president of that company. Powell got 15 months, and advertising executive Michael Johnston got 5 months. On July 22, 2010, Fogel sentenced Seth Sundberg, the branch manager of a mortgage and financial business, to 71 months in prison and $2.4 million in restitution for obtaining a $5 million tax refund from the Internal Revenue Service fraudulently. Sundberg pleaded guilty in January 2010 to mail fraud.

Other cases that Fogel has presided over federally included that of serial bank robber Froilan Alix Roldan, whom he sentenced to 18 years' imprisonment on September 30, 2009. Roldan robbed $90,000 from a Bank of America branch in Santa Clara, California over three instances in three years. Judge Fogel also sentenced NASA Ames Research Center contractor Ernst John Rohde to a five-year term for possessing child pornography on his government computer; two other Ames employees had been convicted of the same offense previously.

On October 29, 2009, Fogel awarded the Palo Alto, California-based social networking website Facebook $711 million in damages in a civil suit that Facebook filed against online marketer Sanford Wallace, whom Facebook accused of using the website to send spam to and steal personal information from website users.

=== California execution moratorium ===
On December 15, 2006, in the case Morales v. Tilton, Judge Fogel ruled that California execution procedures violate the Eighth Amendment to the United States Constitution because inexperienced, untrained prison staff do executions in crowded, poorly lit settings; Fogel wrote that "implementation of lethal injection" by California "is broken, but...can be fixed." That moratorium came ten months after Fogel issued a ruling two hours prior to the scheduled February 21, 2006 execution of Michael Morales with conditions to prevent a painful execution: instead of administering it via intravenous tube, a licensed medical professional would have to inject sodium thiopental directly into Morales' vein. California then delayed the execution, as it could not comply with Fogel's order. Under the same painful death criteria, Fogel issued a stay of execution for Albert Greenwood Brown on September 28, 2010, two days before Brown was scheduled to be executed. In response to Fogel's ruling in Morales v. Tilton, The New York Times wrote in a 2011 editorial: "For legislators in state capitols considering whether to abolish the [death] penalty... this case... has documented how lethal injection can be cruel and unusual punishment when unprofessionally administered and how the culture of prisons breeds that shoddy approach. It is one more reason to reject the death penalty as a barbaric punishment."

== Subsequent career ==
On September 17, 2018, Fogel became the first Executive Director of the Berkeley Judicial Institute, a center at Berkeley Law School whose mission is to build bridges between judges and academics and to promote an ethical, resilient and independent judiciary.

== Personal life ==
Fogel married preschool teacher Kathleen Aim Wilcox and lives in Los Altos, California; their son Nate Wilcox-Fogel attended the Menlo School and Stanford University and played on the football teams of both schools.

== See also ==
- List of Jewish American jurists

Legal offices
Preceded by Robert Aguilar	Judge of the United States District Court for the Northern District of California; 1998–2014	Seat abolished
