= Albert Greenwood Brown =

American convicted rapist, child molester, and murderer on death row

Albert Greenwood Brown Jr.
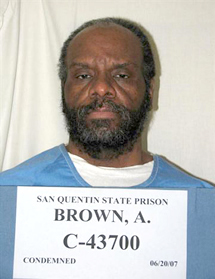
- Born: August 18, 1954 (age 72); Tulare, California, U.S.
- Other name: Albert Greenwood Tweedle
- Status: Incarcerated
- Convictions: First degree murder with special circumstances Forcible rape (2 counts)
- Penalty: Death

Albert Greenwood Brown Jr. (born August 18, 1954) is an American murderer and rapist who has been convicted of sexual molestation with force of a minor, two counts of first-degree rape with force, and the first degree murder of a teen girl in Riverside, California.

He was scheduled to die by lethal injection at 9 p.m. on September 30, 2010, in California's first use of capital punishment since the lifting of a court-ordered moratorium. The use of lethal injection had been suspended in the state since February 2006 because of objections of cruel and unusual punishment for shortcomings of the facilities and procedures previously in use at San Quentin State Prison.

Brown's lawyers appealed to block their client's execution, with the execution initially planned to be carried out in a new facility at the prison that is certified to use either a single or three-drug protocol.

The US Ninth Court of Appeals ordered US District Judge Jeremy D. Fogel to review the case. It noted that the execution date might have been influenced by the fact that the prison's inventory of sodium thiopental, one of the drugs required for lethal injection, would expire on October 1, 2010. Judge Fogel halted the execution to permit time to review whether the new injection procedures addressed previous objections. On September 29, 2010, the Supreme Court of California unanimously denied an appeal by the state to proceed by the end of the month. Brown's execution was then delayed because the prison's supply of the lethal injection drug had expired. The manufacturer of sodium thiopental stated that new supplies would not be available until 2011.

As of 2023, Brown remains on death row as a result of the continuing state-wide suspension of the death penalty in California.

== Early life ==
Albert Greenwood Brown Jr. was born in Tulare, California, on August 18, 1954, and grew up in the same city. His father's family reportedly saw to it that "every kid went to college." According to a Tulare Western High School yearbook, he was to be part of the class of 1972. However, he was expelled from school after he accidentally fired a gun that he had brought on campus and grazed another student in the head on March 13. He joined the US Marine Corps, but was brought to court-martial and discharged in 1975 for being absent without leave.

== Early criminal history ==
He moved to Riverside, California to live with his divorced mother and was soon charged with brutally raping and impregnating an 11-year-old girl. She said that Brown told her since he was a black man and she was a black girl; she was "in need of a feeding." She was forced to perform oral sex, and Brown then violently raped and choked her and sodomized her. He pleaded guilty and was sentenced to two years of probation.

On an early morning in 1976, Brown broke into a home in Riverside and hid in a closet until all of the residents had left. When a 14-year-old girl returned from a paper route to go to school, he choked her unconscious and brutally raped her in her mother's room. Brown pleaded guilty to charges of First Degree with Force on May 4, 1978, and was sentenced to state prison. He was paroled on June 14, 1980, and found work cleaning and preparing new cars for sale at Rubidoux Motors in Riverside County.

== Murder of Susan Louise Jordan ==
On the morning of October 28, 1980, Brown abducted 15-year-old Susan Louise Jordan while she was on her way to Arlington High School in Riverside. He had been posing as a jogger on the route. After dragging her to an orange grove, Brown brutally raped and sodomized her and strangled her to death with her shoelace; he also took her identification cards and school books. Susan's mother, Angelina Jordan, who had coincidentally left her car to be serviced at Brown's workplace, Rubidoux Motors, went to the school to search for Susan after her younger sister, Karen, and younger brother, James, returned home without her. After finding the family's number in a phone book, Brown called Angelina Jordan from a payphone at around 7:30 p.m. to tell her where he left her daughter's body. According to court documents, he said, "Hello, Mrs. Jordan, Susie isn't home from school yet, is she? You will never see your daughter again. You can find her body on the corner of Victoria and Gibson." Susan's body was found after Brown repeatedly made calls to the Riverside Police Department and the Jordan residence. One of Brown's subsequent calls was recorded by a police officer.

== Arrest and investigation ==
Brown was arrested on November 6, 1980, after three witnesses came forward to identify him and his Pontiac Trans Am with a Rubidoux Motors paper plate near the site of the murder. Susan's identification cards were found in a phone booth at a nearby Texaco service station. During a search of Brown's home on November 7, police found Susan's books, a newspaper article about the case, and a Riverside telephone directory in which the page opposite the listing for the Jordan family was folded. Brown was discovered to have been late to work on the day she disappeared. A jogging suit stained with blood and sperm was found in his locker at the employee coffee shop. Brown's shoes were matched to footprints from the crime scene.

== Trial and appeals ==
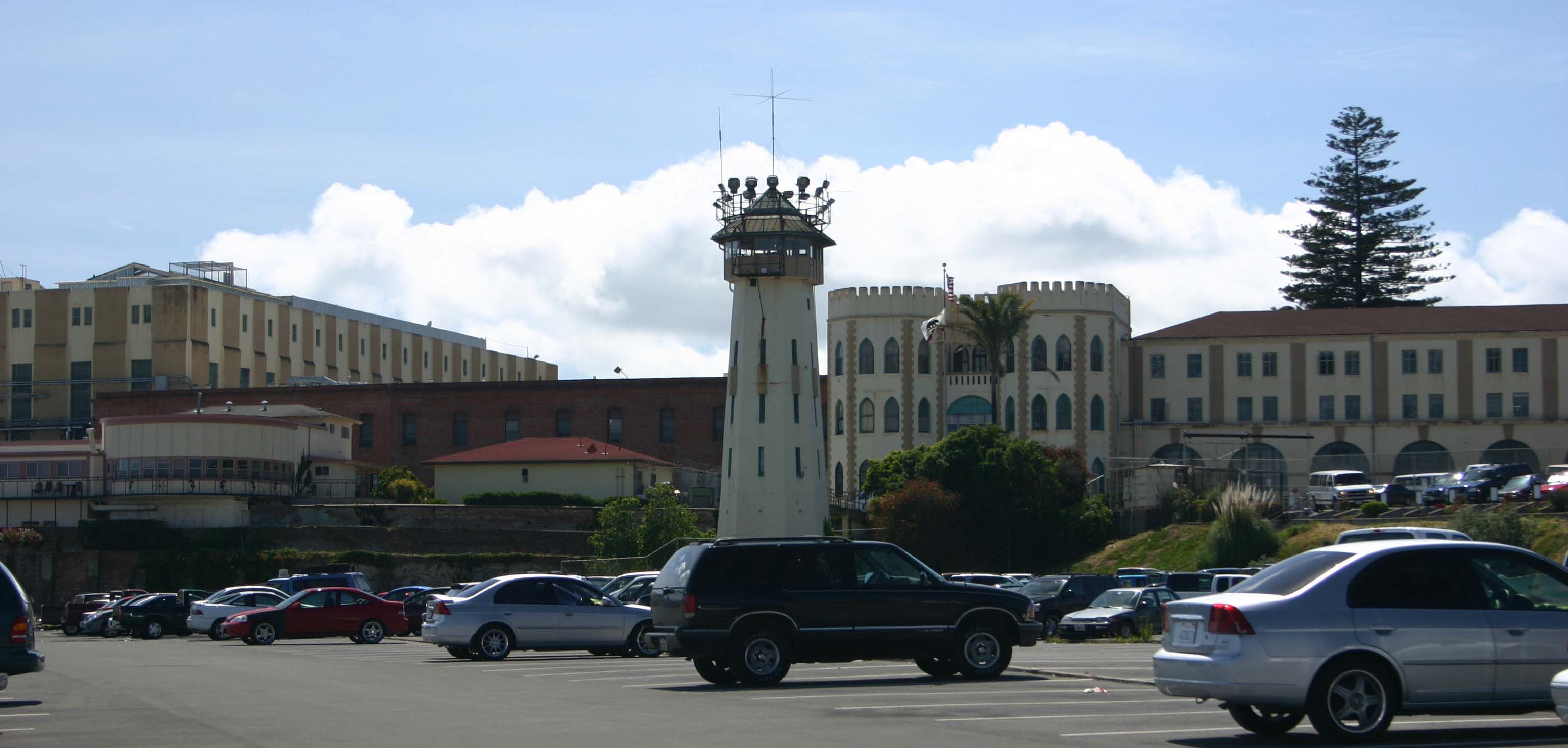
Brown was placed on death row at San Quentin State Prison.

On February 4, 1982, a Riverside County jury convicted Brown of first-degree murder with the special circumstances of first-degree kidnapping and first-degree rape, oral copulation, and first-degree sodomy. During sentencing hearings, his defense attorney argued that Brown was remorseful and presented evidence of psychiatric problems, including sexual dysfunction. Brown claimed that his aunt had physically abused him as a child and that he was spanked by his mother. His mother denied abusing Brown but claimed that her son was out buying milk at the time of the murder. The surviving victim of the 1976 rape case testified against him. The jury deliberated for less than three hours on February 19 and returned a verdict of death. On March 2, 1982, he was placed on death row at San Quentin State Prison in San Quentin, California.

In 1985, Brown's sentence was overturned by the California Supreme Court and reinstated by the US Supreme Court in 1987.

Brown's defense filed a motion of habeas corpus to the US Ninth Circuit Court of Appeals, arguing that he received ineffective counsel at his trial and that his sentence was a cruel and unusual punishment that violated the Eighth Amendment of the US Constitution. On September 19, 2007, Judge Michael Daly Hawkins denied Brown's appeal and upheld lower court rulings.

== Execution proceedings ==
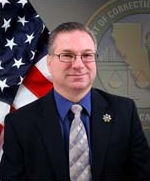
Warden Vince Cullen met with Brown to read his death warrant.

On August 29, 2010, a California court lifted a statewide injunction against capital punishment with the certification of new lethal injection procedures. On the next day, Riverside County District Attorney Rod Pacheco sought a death warrant for Brown. Riverside County Judge Roger Luebs initially set Brown's execution for 12:01 a.m. on September 29, 2010. On August 31, prison warden Vince Cullen personally walked to Brown's cell to read the death warrant to him.

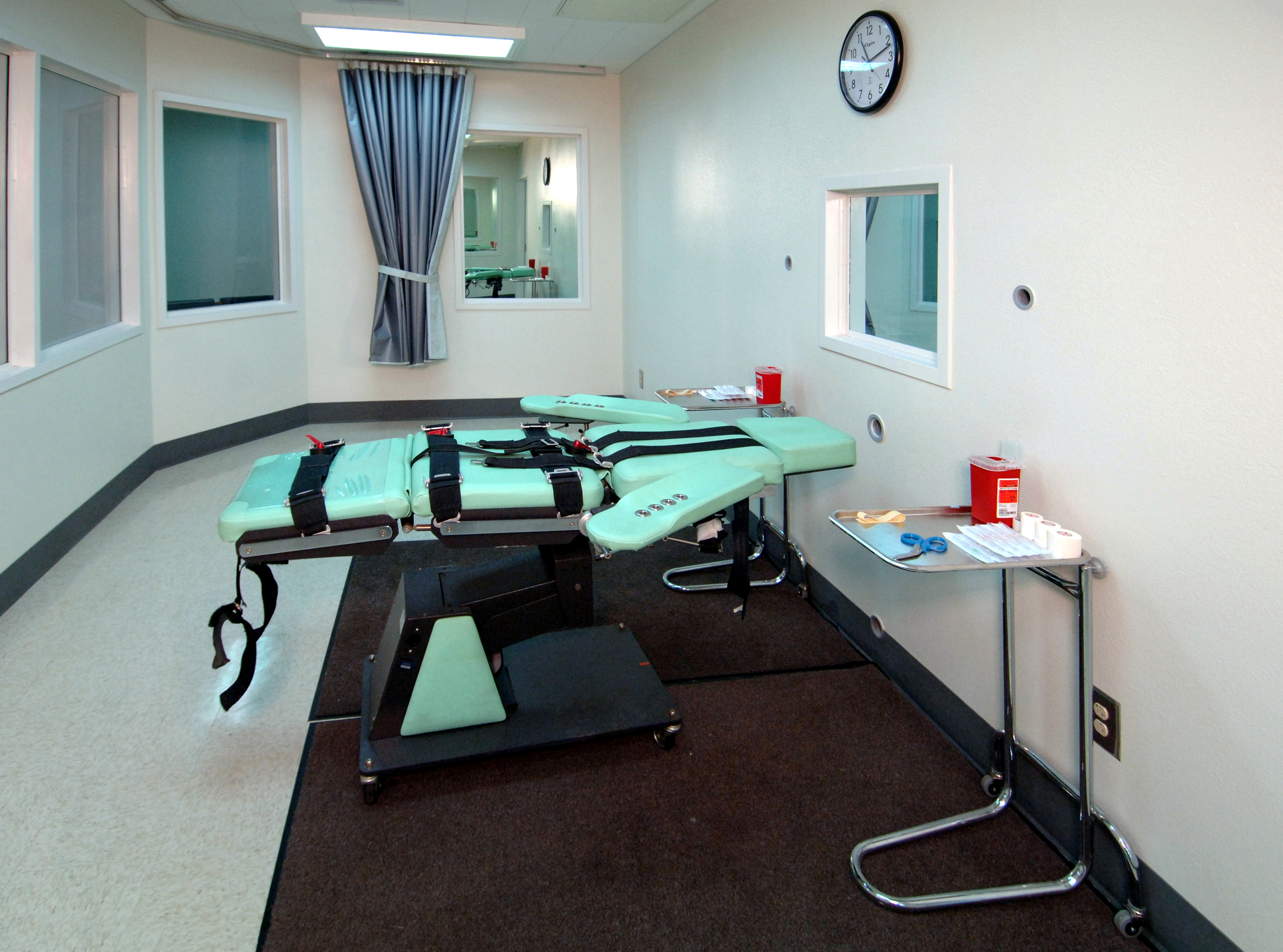
Brown's execution at San Quentin State Prison's new lethal injection facility was halted days before it was scheduled to proceed on September 30, 2010.

Brown would have been the first inmate scheduled to be executed in a newly built facility at San Quentin State Prison. It had undergone an $853,000 renovation that quadrupled its size after U.S. District Court Judge Jeremy D. Fogel blocked the February 2006 execution of convicted murderer Michael Morales because of complaints about lethal injection procedures within the previous chamber. Four different phones were installed with individual red warning lights in the event of a call from the Governor of California, the California Attorney General, the warden, or the US Supreme Court. The facility has been set up to use a protocol of a three-drug combination of sodium thiopental, pancuronium bromide and potassium chloride or a single injection of sodium thiopental in which the dose is increased from 3 to 5 g to make it lethal by itself. Brown was examined by the prison staff to check that his veins were healthy enough for the injection process. He ordered a last meal of steak and onion rings. The premises were also wired with speakers so that his last words could be broadcast.

=== Last-minute appeals ===
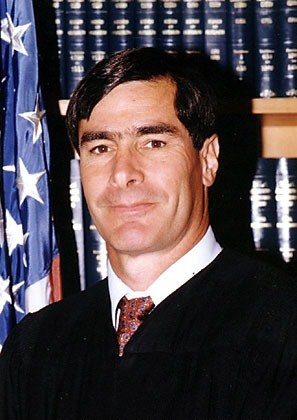
Judge Fogel's ruling halted executions in California for over four years.

Judge Fogel, whose 2006 ruling had halted executions in California, gave Brown until September 26 to decide on a method of execution, including the new lethal injection protocols. Brown refused to make a selection. Defense attorney John Grele described Brown as "a simple man with obvious neuropsychological deficits" who is unprepared to make such a decision. Arguing that forcing him to decide on the manner of his death is "unconstitutionally medieval," Brown's defense team asked the judge to reconsider allowing the execution to proceed. Fogel declined to issue a stay of execution, which he stated would have been considered if Brown had selected a single injection and the prison had refused to carry it out. In the absence of a decision, the prison defaulted to preparing the three-drug protocol.

After a four-year moratorium on executions in California, multiple proceedings in federal court, a state administrative law proceeding, and state court appeals, it is incredible to think that the deliberative process might be driven by the expiration date of the execution drug.

— U.S. 9th Circuit Court of Appeals, 2010

It is absurd that our legal system continues to prevent the state from carrying out the will of the people.

— CA Gov. Arnold Schwarzenegger, 2010

On September 27, Marin County Judge Verna Adams denied a defense request to stop the execution. An appeal for clemency was forwarded to California Governor Arnold Schwarzenegger. Prosecutor Rod Pacheco wrote to Schwarzenegger urging him not to intervene. The governor refused Brown's request to commute the sentence to life imprisonment without parole, but he delayed the execution to 9 p.m. on September 30 to provide appeals courts more time to review the case. Brown alleged that he suffered child abuse that should have been brought up at his trial. The Ninth Circuit Court of Appeals ordered Fogel to revisit the case because California law specified that the inmate had to choose between the gas chamber and lethal injection, not the drugs themselves. Fogel admitted his offer to Brown was "ill-advised" and halted the execution to permit time to determine whether the new injection procedures addressed defense arguments of cruel and unusual punishment. The appeals court also noted that the prison's supply of sodium thiopental, a drug required for lethal injection, was expiring on October 1. A state appeal to resume the execution by 7 p.m. on September 30 was unanimously denied by the California Supreme Court. California and other states had run short of the drug because the manufacturer Hospira was unable to meet demand at least until January 2011 because of raw material supply issues. State Attorney General Jerry Brown (no relation) recommended halting execution proceedings until necessary supplies were secured. His office stated that a new date would be scheduled as soon as legally possible.

On October 6, 2010, the state attorney general's office notified Judge Fogel in a court filing that the state had obtained enough sodium thiopental for up to four more executions. Scott Kernan of the California Department of Corrections and Rehabilitation called the Arizona Department of Corrections "life savers" for providing 12 grams of the drug after the Texas Department of Criminal Justice denied a similar request. The state of California spent $36,415 to acquire an additional 521 g of sodium thiopental from Archimedes Pharma of Great Britain to last until 2014. Fogel stated that he understood the state would request a new execution date no earlier than 30 days after court hearings, which were expected in 2011. Susan Louise Jordan's sister, Karen, criticized the distress to her family caused by the delays: "The appeals process in California has proven to be nothing more than a never-ending war of attrition against justice and the rights of victims and their families."

=== Politicization of execution ===
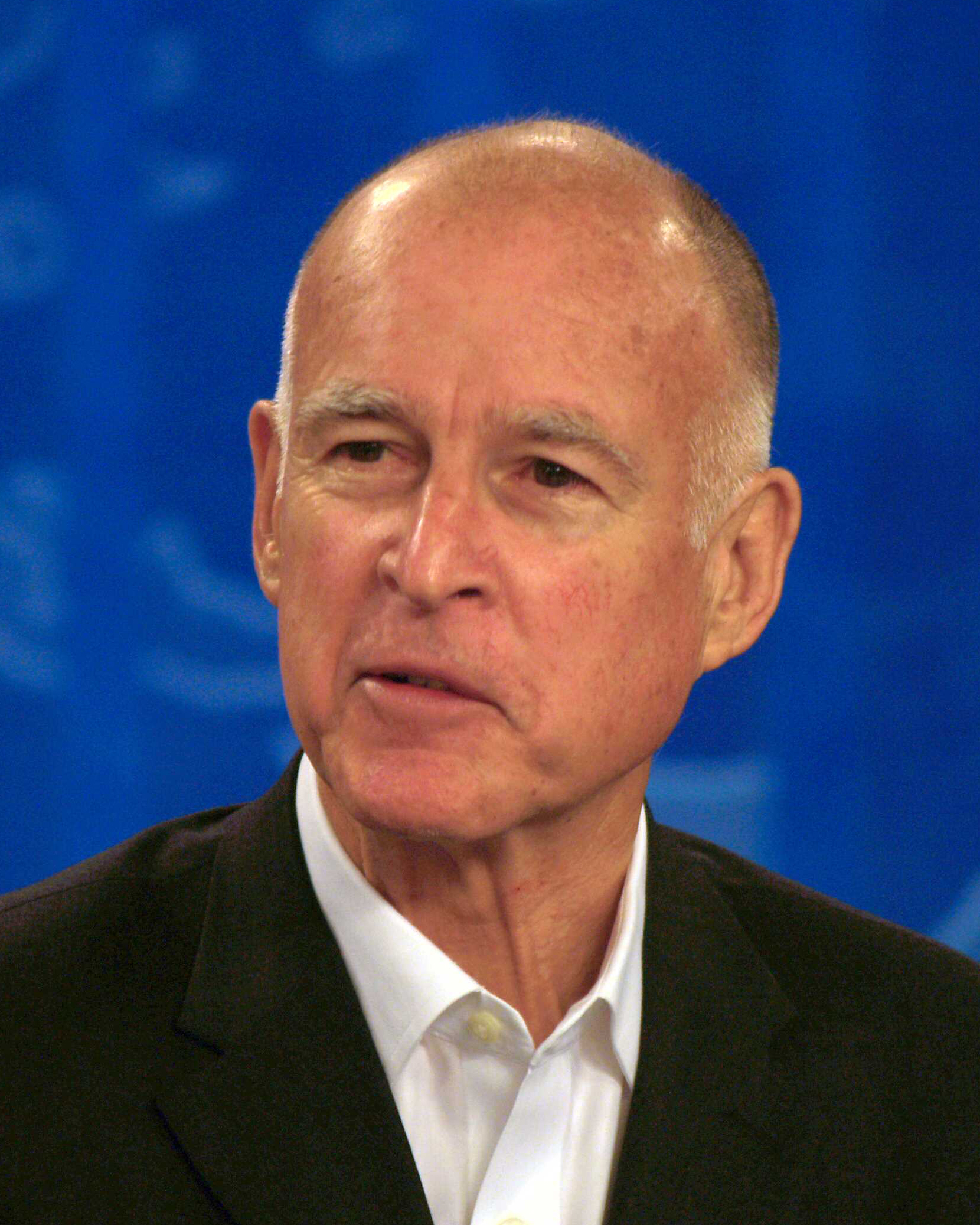
Jerry Brown

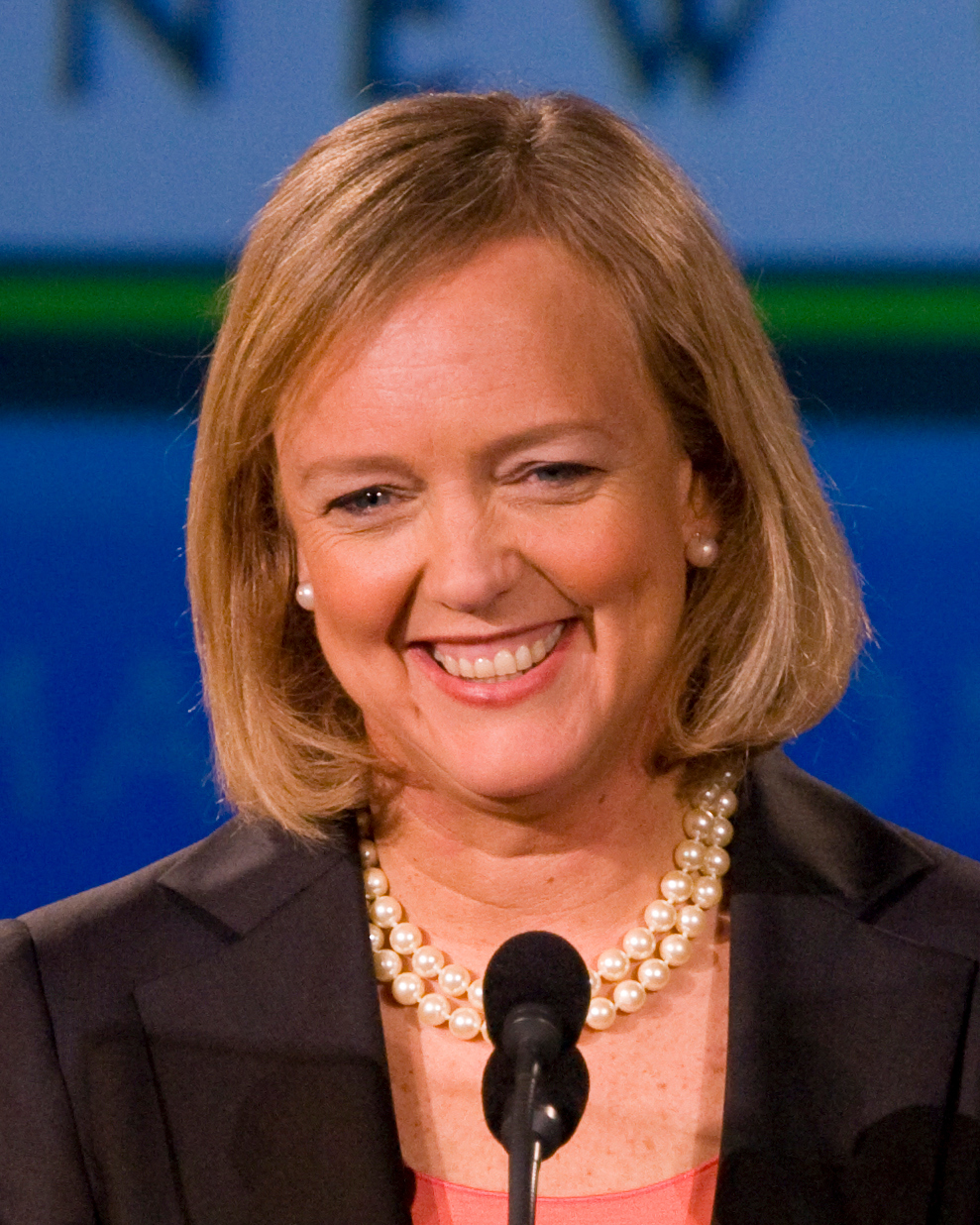
Meg Whitman

Brown's lawyers blamed the move to execute their client on the tight race between Jerry Brown and Meg Whitman for the 2010 California gubernatorial election to succeed retiring Governor Schwarzenegger. The office of State Attorney General Jerry Brown pushed to resume capital punishment after the adoption of new regulations in California. Republican nominee Whitman claimed, "None of this squares with Jerry Brown's record." The Democratic campaign of Jerry Brown, who pledged to "enforce the laws" of California, denied any connection between the case and the election. Prosecutor Rod Pacheco, who supported Whitman, said that it would be unfair to accuse Jerry Brown of using the execution for political gain, as they had never discussed the case. Jerry Brown was quoted as saying, "Albert Greenwood Brown Jr. deserves everything that he has coming to him in regards to due process. I have no doubt that his execution will be carried out fastidiously and in a timely manner." Jerry Brown won the election in November 2010.

== See also ==
- Capital punishment debate
- Capital punishment in California
- Capital punishment in the United States
- List of death row inmates in the United States § California
