= Michael Morales =

Michael Morales may refer to:

- Michael Morales (murderer) (born 1959), American convicted murderer
- Michael Morales (fighter) (born 1999), Ecuadorian mixed martial artist
- Michael Morales (musician) (born 1963), American musician
