= Robert Aguilar =

American judge (1931–2020)

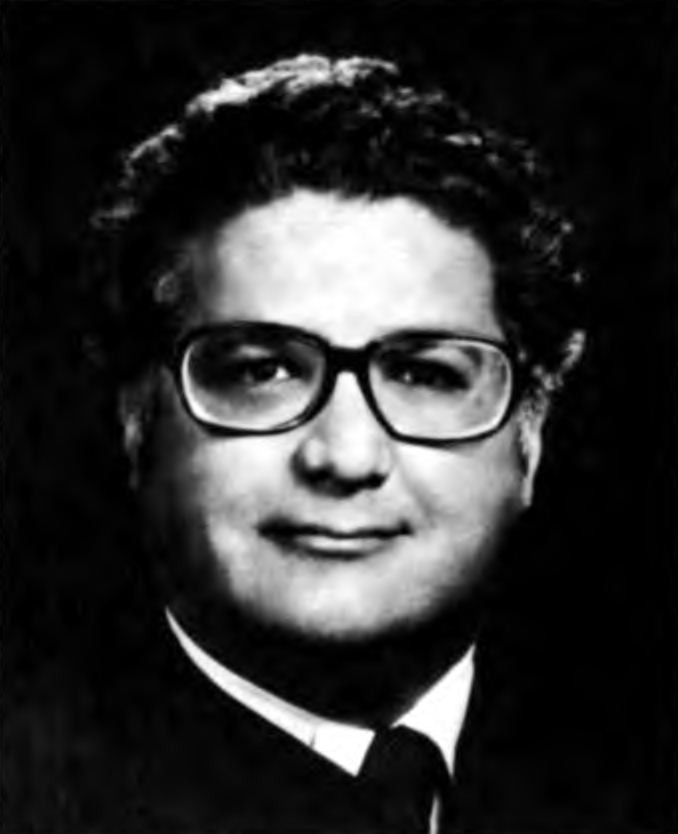

Senior Judge of the United States District Court for the Northern District of California
- In office April 15, 1996 – June 24, 1996

Judge of the United States District Court for the Northern District of California
- In office June 18, 1980 – April 15, 1996
- Appointed by: Jimmy Carter
- Preceded by: Seat established by 92 Stat. 1629
- Succeeded by: Jeremy Fogel

Judge of the Santa Clara County Superior Court
- In office 1979–1980
- Appointed by: Jerry Brown

Personal details
- Born: Robert Peter Aguilar; April 15, 1931 Madera, California, U.S.
- Died: December 2, 2020 (aged 89)
- Spouse(s): Rachel Castellanos (divorced); Elva Soper (divorced)
- Children: 4
- Education: University of California, Berkeley (BA, JD)

Robert Peter Aguilar (April 15, 1931 – December 2, 2020) was a United States district judge of the United States District Court for the Northern District of California.

== Education and career ==
Born in Madera, California, Aguilar received a Bachelor of Arts degree from the University of California, Berkeley in 1954 and pursued legal studies at the University of California, Hastings College of the Law graduating in 1959. He was in private practice in San Jose from 1960 to 1979, and was then a judge on Santa Clara County Superior Court from 1979 to 1980.

== Federal judicial service ==
On April 3, 1980, President Jimmy Carter nominated Aguilar to a new seat on the United States District Court for the Northern District of California created by 92 Stat. 1629. Aguilar was confirmed by the United States Senate on June 18, 1980, and received his commission the same day.

=== Allegations of misconduct ===
In 1989, he was indicted for racketeering and obstruction of justice. Specifically, it was alleged that Aguilar, at the request of Abe Chapman (a convicted narcotics trafficker), tried to influence another judge, Judge Stanley A. Weigel, on behalf of Michael Rudy Tham, a former Teamsters official who was appealing an embezzlement case against him. On March 19, 1990, the case ended in acquittal on Obstruction, and in a mistrial on the other counts. He was retried over the summer and convicted on five counts. and sentenced to six months in prison, 1,000 hours of community service and fined $2,000 on conviction of unlawfully disclosing a Government wiretap and obstructing justice by lying to Federal agents about it. He continued to be out on bail while his appeals took place and refused to resign. In 1993, he faced impeachment proceedings, but they were put on hold when the conviction was overturned the following year. For this reason, he was able to assume senior status on April 15, 1996, but chose to retire two months later on June 24, 1996.

== Post judicial service ==
Aguilar returned to the private practice of law in Santa Clara County, from the time of his retirement from the federal bench until 2015, when he retired from the bar. He died on December 2, 2020, aged 89.

== See also ==
- List of Hispanic and Latino American jurists

== Sources ==
- Selection and confirmation of Federal judges : hearing before the Committee on the Judiciary, United States Senate, Ninety-sixth Congress, first session ... pt.6 (1980)

Legal offices
Preceded by Seat established by 92 Stat. 1629	Judge of the United States District Court for the Northern District of California; 1980–1996	Succeeded by Jeremy Fogel
