= Musso (disambiguation) =

Munawar Musso (1897–1948) was an Indonesian politician.

Musso may also refer to:

- Musso (surname)
- Musso, Lombardy, a comune in the province of Como, Italy
- Musso & Frank Grill, a restaurant in the City of Los Angeles, California
- KGM Musso, a South Korean SUV and Pickup truck manufactured by SsangYong
- SsangYong Musso Sports, a South Korean SUT model manufactured by SsangYong 2002 to 2005

== See also ==
- Benito Mussolini (1883–1945), fascist Italian dictator, sometimes referred to by the truncation of his last name
- Muso (disambiguation)
