= Abdoulaye Djimdé =

Malian microbiologist and immunologist

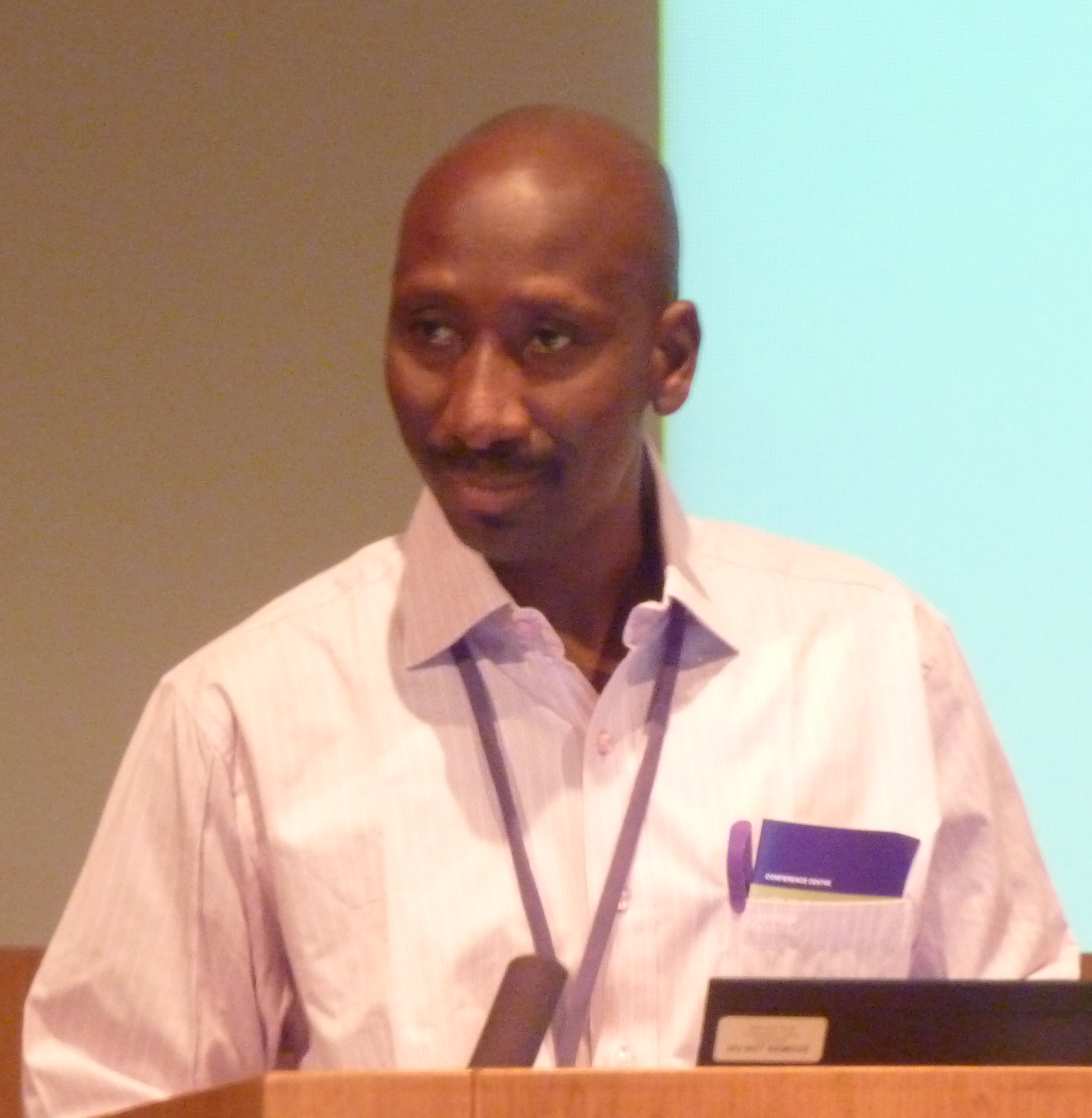
- Abdoulaye Djimdé in 2010
- Education: University of Mali; University of Maryland, Baltimore County
- Scientific career
- Workplaces: Université des Sciences, des Techniques et des Technologies de Bamako

Abdoulaye Djimdé is a Malian microbiologist and immunologist serving as a professor in Mali. He is the President of both the Pathogens Genomic Diversity Network Africa (PDNA) and the African Association for Research and Control of Anti-Microbial Resistance (AAAMR).

He is Chief of the Molecular Epidemiology and Drug Resistance Unit at the University of Bamako Malaria Research and Training Centre. He also oversees the Developing Excellence in Leadership and Genetics Training for Malaria (DELGEME) program under DELTAS Africa.

Djimdé's research focuses on the genetic epidemiology of antimalarial drug resistance, which has contributed to changes in first-line antimalarial therapy in Africa.

He is further recognized as a Wellcome Sanger Institute International Fellow and a recipient of the Calestous Juma Leadership Fellowship by the Bill and Melinda Gates Foundation. He has received multiple awards, including the Chevalier de l’Ordre National from the Government of Mali and the Fighting Malaria Prize from the Federation of the European Societies for Tropical Medicine and International Health among other honors.

== Early life and education ==
Djimdé was born in Mali. He earned a doctorate in pharmacy in 1988 at the University of Bamako. He opened his pharmacy and realised that people needed more effective methods to treat malaria. He began to volunteer with Ogobara Doumbo at the new Malaria Research and Training Centre, and moved to the University of Maryland, Baltimore County to complete a PhD. He worked with the National Institutes of Health and identified the first molecular marker of chloroquine resistant malaria. During his PhD he joined the American Society of Tropical Medicine and Hygiene.

== Research career ==
Since 2002, Djimdé has led the Malaria Research and Training Center (MRTC), focusing on genetic events in malaria and their impact on drug resistance. In 2012, he became associate professor of Parasitology and Microbiology at the University of Bamako.

In 2016, he became the Director of Developing Excellence in Leadership and Genetics Training for Malaria Elimination in sub-Saharan Africa (DELGEME). DELGEME trains graduates, postdocs and fellows in bioinformatics and genomics of malaria. He coordinates clinical trials for antimalarials in Western Africa. He led the trail of Pyramax, which he showed could be used to treat multiple episodes of malaria.

In 2017, Djimdé was appointed President of the African Association for Research and Control of Anti-Microbial Resistance (AARAM). Later, he became director of the MRTC at the University of Bamako, where he and his research group are trying to identify how variation of the genome of Plasmodium Falciparum and Anopheles Gambiae help malaria to spread.

Djimdé is President of the Plasmodium Diversity Network Africa (PDNA). PDNA's network spans 11 countries in Sub-Saharan Africa, fostering collaboration among African scientists to influence global health policy.

He is the coordinator of the West African Network for Clinical Trials of Antimalarial Drugs (WANECAM2), supported by the European and Developing Countries Clinical Trials Partnership (EDCTP) to conduct accelerate the development of the Ganaplacide/Lumefantrine combination for the treatment of uncomplicated malaria in Mali, Burkina Faso, and Guinea.

Djimdé has been recognized for his contributions with fellowships from the Howard Hughes Medical Institute Fellowship and Wellcome Sanger Institute Fellowship. Djimdé has been on the Elsevier radio show "Malaria Nexus".

=== Awards and honours ===
- 2001 Chevalier l’Ordre National du Mali
- 2002 Federation of the European Societies for Tropical Medicine and International Health and Sanofi~Synthélabo Award
- 2004 European and Developing Countries Clinical Trials Partnership Fellowship
- 2005 Howard Hughes Medical Institute International Scholar
- 2009 National Academy of Pharmacy of France Prix de la Pharmacie Francophone
- 2012 Wellcome Trust Sanger Institute Fellowship
- 2016 African Academy of Science Fellowship
- 2018 Member of the Academy of Sciences of Mali
- 2021 The World Academy of Sciences Fellowship
- 2021 Calestous Juma Research Leadership Fellow, Bill and Mellinda Gates, Foundation
- 2021 The Joseph Augustin LePrince Medal, for outstanding work in the field of malariology, American Society of Tropical Medicine, and Hygiene
- 2023 Lauréat Prix Christophe Mérieux, Institut de France
