= Participation of medical professionals in American executions =

Participation of medical professionals in American executions is a controversial topic, due to its moral and legal implications. The practice is proscribed by the American Medical Association, as defined in its Code of Medical Ethics. The American Society of Anesthesiologists endorses this position, stating that lethal injections "can never conform to the science, art and practice of anesthesiology".

In 2010, the American Board of Anesthesiologists, a member board of the American Board of Medical Specialties, voted to revoke the certification of anesthesiologists who participate in executing a prisoner by lethal injection. Board secretary Mark A. Rockoff defended the organization's policy, stating that participation in executions "puts anesthesiologists in an untenable position," and that physicians "can assuredly provide effective anesthesia, but doing so in order to cause a patient's death is a violation of their fundamental duty as physicians to do no harm."

In at least one case, the planned execution of Michael Morales, the execution warrant was stayed indefinitely due to the objection of the contacted physicians to participate.

The topic was the subject of a 1992 review by the American Medical Association, entitled Physician Participation in Capital Punishment.

Given the ethical conflicts involved, no physician, even if employed by the state, should be compelled to participate in the process of establishing a prisoner's competence to be executed if such activity is contrary to the physician's personal beliefs. Similarly, physicians who would prefer not to be involved with the treatment of an incompetent, condemned prisoner should be excused or permitted to transfer care of the prisoner to another physician.

— American Medical Association

== Moral discussion ==
A physician, as a member of the profession dedicated to preserving life when there is hope of doing so, should not be a participant in a state execution.

— American Medical Association

U.S. Supreme Court cases discussing the constitutionality of execution methods often involve testimony of medical professionals; one example of such a case being the 2008 Baze v. Rees case, which affirmed the constitutionality of the three-drug lethal injection protocol as a method of capital punishment, despite claims that the single drug used for animal euthanasia is more humane than the three-drug cocktail currently used.

One particular concern to opponents of physician participation in capital punishment is the role that health care providers have played in treating or reviving patients to render them fit for execution. In a 1995 Oklahoma case, death row inmate Robert Brecheen intentionally overdosed on sleeping pills hours before his scheduled lethal injection. He was immediately hospitalized and had his stomach pumped, before being returned to prison for his execution. In a similar 1999 case in Texas, David M. Long attempted suicide by drug overdose two days before his execution date and prison authorities flew him from an intensive care unit in Galveston, on a ventilator, accompanied by a full medical team, to the death chamber in Huntsville.

A survey of physicians was conducted concerning the ethics of engaging in eight actions considered by the American Medical Association to constitute participation in capital punishment, and therefore deemed unethical for physicians. The eight actions were (a) administration of lethal drugs, (b) starting intravenous lines for such drugs, (c) maintaining or inspecting lethal injection devices, (d) ordering lethal drugs, (e) supervising the administration of lethal drugs, (f) selecting injection sites, (g) monitoring vital signs during the execution, and (h) determining death. According to the findings, "Eighty percent indicated that at least 1 of the disallowed actions was acceptable, 53% indicated that 5 or more were acceptable, and 34% approved all 8 disallowed actions. The percentage of respondents approving of disallowed actions varied from 43% for injecting lethal drugs to 74% for determining when death occurred."

== Botched executions ==
Possibly botched executions include those of Stanley Williams, Ángel Nieves Díaz, and others. The first execution by lethal injection that failed to kill the condemned prisoner in the United States occurred on September 15, 2009, in Ohio, when executioners attempted and then aborted the execution of Romell Broom, leading to the implementation of a one-drug method. On September 30, 2026, Christa Pike’s attempted execution by lethal injection failed after two syringes of lethal drugs were administered. More than six decades earlier, on May 3, 1946, an unsuccessful attempt at the electrocution of Willie Francis, then aged 17, led to an appeal to the U.S. Supreme Court to reject a second attempt at electrocuting Francis, which failed by a 5–4 vote in Francis v. Resweber, resulting in Francis' successful electrocution just over a year later, on May 9, 1947.

In many of these executions, the result of the error has been that executions have taken many times as long as they should have – in one case, the execution of Christopher Newton, an execution took up to two hours to complete, fifteen times longer than average; ideally, executions should be completed within about eight minutes. Some have claimed that such executions may have induced excruciating pain, a possible violation of the Eighth Amendment. This has been argued in the Supreme Court case Hill v. McDonough. Errors occurring in these botched executions include the incorrect placing of IV lines, and injection of too little anaesthetic, reported in one study to have been consistent with awareness in 43% (21 executions) of the forty-nine executions in the study.

Since the reinstatement of capital punishment in 1976, there have been, according to one study, forty-one possibly botched executions. On, January 7, 2008, the U.S. Supreme Court heard oral arguments in Baze v. Rees, a case challenging the three-drug cocktail used for many executions by lethal injection. The respondent's lawyer, Roy T. Englert, Jr., referred to the Death Penalty Information Center's list of "botched" executions. He criticized it because a majority of the executions on the list, according to respondent, "did not involve the infliction of pain, but were only delayed by technical problems (e.g., difficulty in finding a suitable vein)". However, the petitioners' attorney disagreed.

== Legal implications ==
Some death penalty states allow physician participation in executions and a few even require it. To protect participating physicians from license challenges for violating ethics codes, states commonly provide legal immunity and promise anonymity. The North Carolina Supreme Court ruled 4–3 that the Medical Board cannot discipline doctors who participate in executions, stating that the statutes providing for lethal injection are superior to ethical guides.

== Proscription in the Hippocratic Oath ==
The practice is proscribed in the Hippocratic Oath, an ethical guide for the medical profession, albeit with no legal or constitutional force, which states:

I will not give a lethal drug to anyone if I am asked, nor will I advise such a plan.

== See also ==
- Carlo Musso
- Organ donation in the United States prison population
