= Prisoner rights in the United States =

All prisoners have the basic rights needed to survive and sustain a reasonable way of life. Most rights are taken away ostensibly so the prison system can maintain order, discipline, and security. Any of the following rights, given to prisoners, can be taken away for that purpose:

Prisoner may refer to one of the following:

- A person incarcerated in a prison or jail or similar facility.
- Prisoner of war, a combatant or non-combatant in wartime, held by a belligerent power
- Political prisoner, someone held in prison for their ideology.
- A person forcibly detained against his will, such as a victim of kidnapping; such prisoners may be held hostage, or held to ransom, but not necessarily in a prison or similar facility.

The right to:

- not be punished cruelly or unusually
- due processes
- administrative appeals
- access the parole process (denied to those incarcerated in the Federal System)
- practice religion freely
- equal protection (Fourteenth Amendment)
- be notified of all charges against them
- receive a written statement explaining evidence used in reaching a disposition
- file a civil suit against another person
- medical treatment (both long and short term)
- treatment that is both adequate and appropriate
- a hearing upon being relocated to the mental health facility.
- personal property such as: cigarettes, stationery, a watch, glasses, cosmetics, and snack-food
- visitation
- privacy
- food that would sustain an average person adequately.
- bathe (for sanitation and health reasons).

Many rights are taken away from prisoners often temporarily. For example, prison personnel are required to read and inspect all in-going or out-going mail, in order to prevent prisoners from obtaining contraband. The only time a prisoner has a full right to privacy is in conversations with their attorney.

== Prison Litigation Reform Act ==
In the United States, the Prison Litigation Reform Act, or PLRA, is a federal statute enacted in 1996 with the intent of limiting "frivolous lawsuits" by prisoners. Among its provisions, the PLRA requires prisoners to exhaust all possibly executive means of reform before filing for litigation, restricts the normal procedure of having the losing defendant pay legal fees (thus making fewer lawyers willing to represent a prisoner), allows for the courts to dismiss cases as "frivolous" or "malicious", and requires prisoners to pay their court fees up front if they have three previous instances of a case having been dismissed as "frivolous."

== See also ==
- Human rights in the United States #Prison system
- Decarceration in the United States
- Prisoner abuse in the United States
- Penal labor in the United States
- Prison rape in the United States
- Organ donation in the United States prison population
