= Organ donation in the United States prison population =

Aspect of criminal justice and medical care

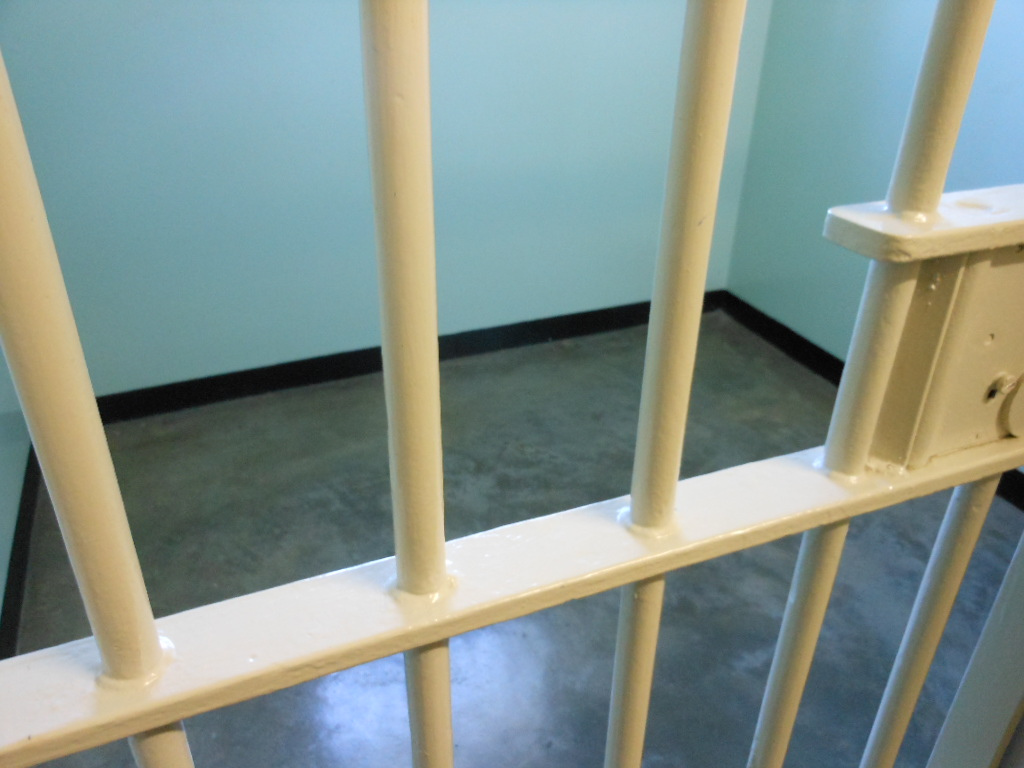
Prison Bar Cells (www.JobsForFelonsHub.com)

Organ donation in the United States prison population is the donation of biological tissues or organs from incarcerated individuals to living recipients in need of a transplantation. The topic includes debate surrounding prisoners as organ donors and recipients, such as legal needs for medical care, and debates on true consent, coercion, and equity regarding organ allocation.

== General prison population ==
=== As living donors ===
Prisons typically do not allow inmates to donate organs as living donors to anyone but immediate family members. There is no law against prisoner organ donation; however, the transplant community has discouraged use of prisoner's organs since the early 1990s due to concern over prisons' high-risk environment for infectious diseases. Physicians and ethicists criticize the idea because a prisoner is not able to consent to the procedure in a free and non-coercive environment, especially if they are given inducements to participate. Additionally, many prisoners would not be eligible donors due to age, as many on death row are in their fifties or older. However, with modern testing advances to more safely rule out infectious disease and by ensuring that there are no incentives offered to participate, some have argued that prisoners can now voluntarily consent to organ donation just as they can now consent to medical procedures in general. With careful safeguards, and with over 2 million prisoners in the U.S., they reason that prisoners can provide a solution for reducing organ shortages in the U.S.

=== As recipients ===
In the United States, prisoners are not discriminated against as organ recipients and are equally eligible for organ transplants along with the general population. In Estelle v. Gamble, decided in 1976, the United States Supreme Court ruled that withholding health care from prisoners constitutes "cruel and unusual punishment". United Network for Organ Sharing, the organization that coordinates available organs with recipients, does not factor in a patient's prison status when determining suitability for a transplant. Organ transplant and follow-up care can cost the prison system up to one million dollars. If a prisoner qualifies, a state may allow compassionate early release to avoid the high costs associated with organ transplants. However, an organ transplant may save the prison system substantial costs usually associated with dialysis and other life-extending treatments required by the prisoner with the failing organ. Living organ donation, as an alternative to deceased organ donation, has become an option given its low complication rates and more positive outcomes. For example, the estimated cost of a kidney transplant is about $111,000. A prisoner's dialysis treatments are estimated to cost a prison $120,000 per year.

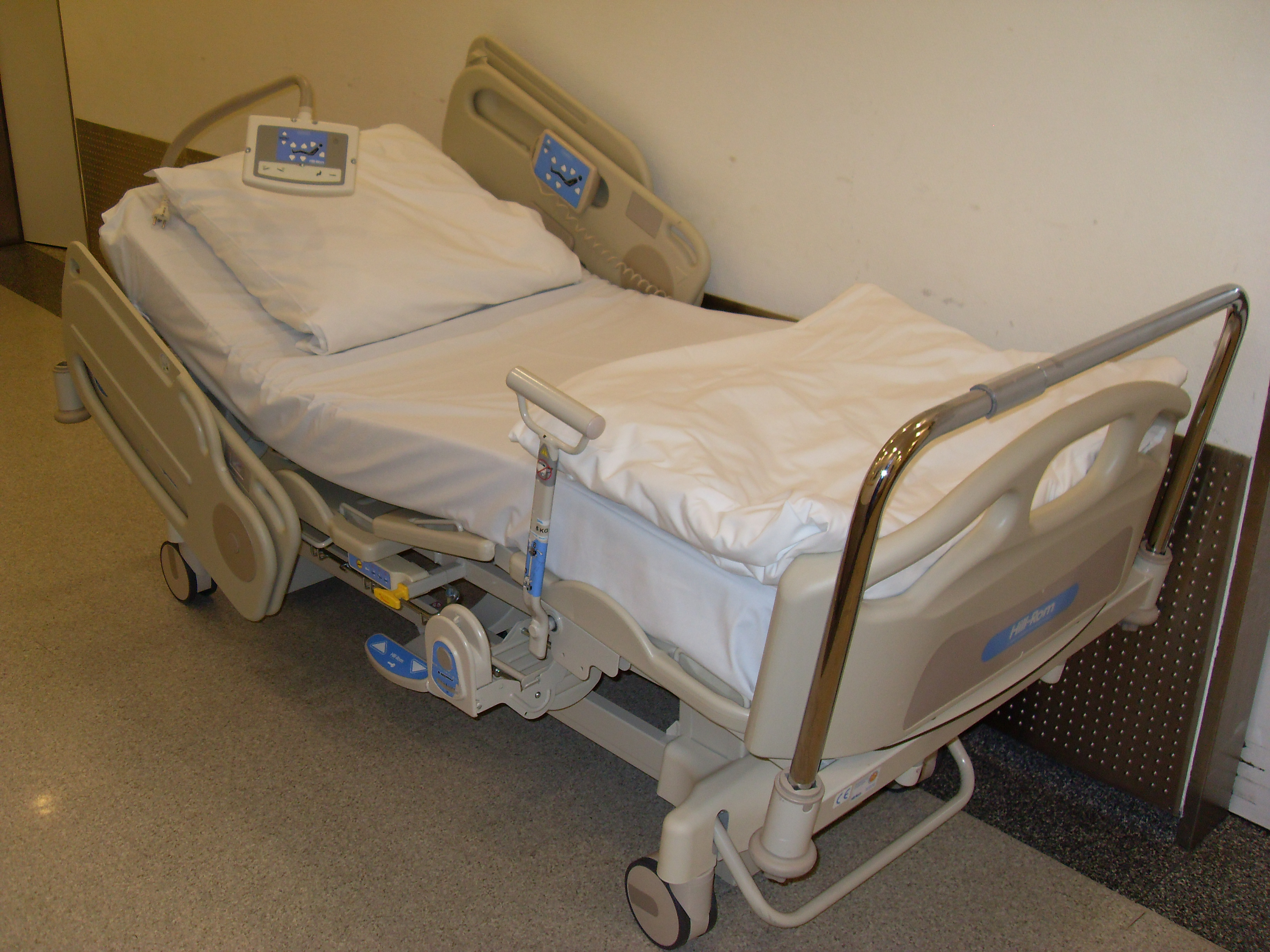
Hospital Bed During Stay

Because donor organs are in short supply, there are more people waiting for a transplant than available organs. According to national organ transplant data, over 100,000 people in the United States of waiting for an organ transplant. This highlight the extremes shortage of organs in the country and how critical improving organ transplant access is. When a prisoner receives an organ, there is a high probability that someone else will die waiting for the next available organ. A response to this ethical dilemma states that felons who have a history of violent crime, who have violated others’ basic rights, have lost the right to receive an organ transplant, though it is noted that it would be necessary "to reform our justice system to minimize the chance of an innocent person being wrongly convicted of a violent crime and thus being denied an organ transplant"

=== United States Donation Policies ===
Throughout the United States, each state has different policies regarding requirements for organ donation in prison. Currently there is no federal laws, and it is left at the state level. A 2023 study by JAMA Network identified the discrepancies in state policies. Some states allow living donation, some allow tissue and bone marrow donation, and donation after death is the most popular throughout states. The study also found a lack of transparency on organ donation policy creating an uneven access to the opportunity, giving prisoners with insider knowledge the upper hand.

== Death row inmates ==
The practice of death row inmates donating organs while alive follows closely to that of their more general inmate counterparts. Where they differ is in their inability to have their organs donated following their execution. Although no law specifically forbids death row inmates from donating organs postmortem, as of 2013 all requests by death row inmates to donate their organs after execution have been denied by states. Additionally there is debate about whether current organ donation guidelines, outlined in the National Organ Transplant Act of 1984 and the Uniform Anatomical Gift Act, implicitly prohibit death row inmates from being organ donors.

Questions regarding the benefits, practicality, morality and ethics of allowing death row inmates to donate their organs postmortem have garnered attention following two highly publicized events: an editorial by condemned prisoner Christian Longo published in The New York Times advocating for the right of fellow death row inmates to donate their organs, and the request by death row inmate Gregory Scott Johnson to have his execution stayed until he could donate a portion of his hepatitis-infected liver to his debilitated sister.

Debate over the postmortem organ donation of death row inmates has been discussed across the general public, medical organizations, and bioethicists. Several opinions polls, such as surveys of transplant candidates and the general public, have indicated support for allowing these donations, although results may vary depending on sample population. On the contrary, transplant and medical organizations including the United Network for Organ Sharing and the American Medical Association generally oppose death row inmate donation. Bioethicists, however, remain divided on the topic and its ethical implications.

=== Benefits ===
Organ donation has the potential to greatly improve quality of life as well as prevent death in patients with end-stage organ failure. There is an endemic shortage of organ donors within the United States, resulting in an immediate and persistent need for additional, suitable organ donors. Death row inmates are a possible source of additional organs. Medical professionals have expressed how beneficial these donations would be, and with appropriate screening, there is no medical reason death row inmates cannot be organ donors. As of 2023, there are 2,241 individuals on death row. Participation of these individuals in organ donations would provide hundreds to possibly thousands of organs for donation.However, the quality and number of organs that death row inmates can potentially contribute is debated. Another benefit of organ donation within inmates is striving for a higher level of racial equity in the medical donation process. In a study done between 2010 and 2014 Hispanic recipients are 50% less likely and Black recipients were 25% less likely to receive a live saving kidney from a live donor. Organs are not always matched based on ethnic background a donor, but recipients having similar racial backgrounds can lead to more compatible blood types and tissue markers and ultimately more matches. With the majority of death row inmates being either Black or Hispanic (40.66% Black and 14.7% Hispanic), allowing death row inmates to donate organs could lead to more matches. The hope being that allowing organ donation in United States prisons could acknowledge systemic racial inequities within prison systems and donation processes.

=== Practical barriers ===
Suitability

The same reasons that make the general prison population less suitable to be organ donors—poor health and increased chance of infectious disease—also apply to death row inmates. However, due to the preplanned nature of executions and lengthy time periods before they are carried out death row inmates have a greater potential to be screened thoroughly beforehand. Additionally many death row inmates are in isolation from the general population, reducing their chances of having contracted a communicable disease.

Other factors, however, variably decrease the suitability of death row inmates as organ donors. The average age of people on death row is over fifty, and chronic medical conditions such as diabetes and hypertension are common. Potentially half of the death row inmates would be unsuitable for organ donation.

Medical constraints

The primary method of execution in the United States is via lethal injection which generally involves the administration of three drugs: sodium thiopental, a sedative to induce unconsciousness, pancuronium bromide (Pavulon), a muscle relaxant to cause respiratory arrest, and potassium chloride to trigger cardiac arrest. Organ donation following this method of lethal injection is often compared to donation after circulatory death (DCD). Similar to DCD organ donation following lethal injection faces the challenge of gathering organs before they become unusable due to hypoxia. Both the American Medical Association and the American Society of Anesthesiology oppose their members from participating in executions, although their abilities to sanction members for doing so are limited. In order to avoid the transplanting physician's involvement in the death of the inmate, the cause of death must be determined to be from lethal injection, and not from the removal of the patients organs. This means that after lethal injection, the medical examiner waits 10–15 minutes to test for sign of cardiac activity before pronouncing them dead. During this time hypoxia destroying the organs becomes a serious issue, but removal of the organs any earlier risks making the removal of the inmate's organs the cause of death and not the lethal injection.

Additionally the facilities that oversee executions are not equipped to handle the organ removal surgery. Revamping these facilities to be able to handle such surgeries would be very costly. This leaves two other options, changing the location of execution to a hospital, or moving inmates to a hospital after their execution. The first option would be difficult due to hospitals not wanting to oversee executions, and the second option risks further hypoxia of the organs during the time it takes to transport the inmates.

=== Moral and ethical considerations ===
Some considerations for organ donation from those on death row mirror those of general prison population. Indirect coercion, and mental stress can possibly impair the ability of a death row inmate to make a fully informed decision. Becoming an organ donor may influence the appeals process, where sympathy or the chance of another individual benefiting from the inmate's death may come into consideration. Additionally there is fear that the possibility of organ donation could influence the judgement jurors who may weigh the possibility of someone being able to live at the expense of the accused when deciding their verdict. Thus, whether or not depriving death row inmates the ability to donate their organs is protecting their rights, or stripping them away, continues to be debated.

These ethical concerns have also been prevalent in recent years. Debates surrounding organ donation via incarcerated people have focused on changing donation policies. In 2023, a Massachusetts bill proposed permitting incarcerated individuals to donate organs or bone marrow for a reduced sentence. This bill had a lot of criticism for health care professionals and ethicists. Many argued that these sentence reductions raise concerns about if the consent is truly voluntary or not, as well as the possibility of exploitation of prisoners. On the contrary, many supported the bill as it could address organ shortages, especially for underrepresented communities. However, due to the critics and backlash, the proposal was later revised.

=== Underrepresented Groups ===
Existing racial inequality in organ donation may be exacerbated through organ donation in prison populations. U.S. National data provided by the Health Resources & Services Administration highlights a lack of access to organ donation for Hispanic and Black Americans, as well as these groups being overrepresented in prison populations. JAMA Network Open reflects the same data, and expresses concern that prison organ donation reinforces these inequalities furthering the impacts across the country.

=== Real Life Cases of Prisoner Organ Donation ===
Examples of prisoner organ donation are scarcely recorded, making it difficult to draw conclusions on the matter. One case often referenced was recorded by the American Journal of Transplantation. A death row prisoner wanted to donate his kidney to a family member. Upon request the prisoner was examined by a medical team who found him to be a viable candidate and a medical match to his family member. The record included evidence that the transplant team investigated for any sign of coercion before approving the procedure. Unfortunately, despite being medically and mentally sound, the correctional facility made it impossible for the procedure to go through. They took issue with the lack of proper security measures being available during the procedure and during the care the prisoner would need post operation. This case highlights the lack of procedure surrounding organ donation, the reason the donation was denied being for logistical and safety reasons, rather than medical or ethical.

== Current state of Organ Donation in Prisons ==
=== Massachusetts Bill for Prisoner Organ Donation ===
Recently, in 2023 two Massachusetts legislators, Carlos Gonzalez and Judith A. Garcia proposed bill HD .3822 An Act to establish the Massachusetts incarcerated individual bone marrow and organ donation program that would allow for incarcerated individuals within the Massachusetts prison system to donate bone marrow or organs in exchange for a reduced sentence. The bill immediately caused debate on the ethical considerations. Supporters of the bill noted that this bill could allow for more equity within the donation process allowing African American and Hispanic imamates to donate and raise the chances of a donor/recipient match. Others argued that the bill causes coercion offering a reduced sentence of 60 to 365 days to those who would choose to donate giving them a "no choice" situation when there is no better alternative option offered compelling one to choose an offer even if it harms them. Within historical context in the United States, fear that this could be a sort of experimentation on prisoners arose as well. The prison systems within the United States have many records showing unlawful medical experimentation or clinical trials done on prisoners who didn't know or feel as though they had any other choice then to participate undermining the voluntary consent necessary for medical bioethics. Eventually the bill was redacted and rewritten without the chance of a reduced sentence, but it is still debated between supporting and opposing parties whether or not this should be ethically permitted.

== See also ==
- Bioethics
- Medical law
- Prisoner rights in the United States
- Participation of medical professionals in American executions
