= Food sovereignty in Bolivia =

Food sovereignty is a highly influential idea in Bolivian political discourse. It is incorporated into multiple pieces of Bolivian legislation, including the 2009 constitution drafted underneath president Evo Morales. Food sovereignty fits into Morales' larger goal of the symbolic decolonization of Bolivia. First coined by indigenous and peasant worker advocacy organization Via Campesina, food sovereignty is the right for a state's people to produce and distribute culturally appropriate foods without the impingement of economic pressures created by foreign agribusiness producers. The presence of foreign agribusiness in Bolivia can be traced back to exploitative resource extraction that proliferated in South America with 19th century liberalism. Modern-day wholesale agribusiness production makes competition difficult for Bolivia's small-scale farmers, who often take out high-interest loans and consequently accumulate debt.

In Bolivia, indigenous peasant groups and government actors emphasize the value of traditional indigenous agricultural practices, the conservation of Bolivia's agricultural biodiversity, and the strengthening of internal markets as benefits of food sovereignty. The government's prioritization of strengthening Bolivia's economy through food sovereignty can contradict indigenous peasant priorities to alleviate rural poverty and restore the ability to make a living off of farmers' own home-plots.

== Food Sovereignty Legislation in Bolivia ==
The inclusion of food sovereignty into Bolivian legislation is understood by advocates as an essential step to the symbolic deconstruction of imperialist and racist histories, however the extent and ways by which the government is able to implement such policy is debated.

=== 2009 Constitution ===
Food sovereignty was incorporated into the Constitution of Bolivia in 2009 under indigenous president Evo Morales. Bolivia follows Venezuela and Ecuador in incorporating food sovereignty into its constitution. Food sovereignty is first mentioned in Article 255 in which “Food security and sovereignty for the entire population; the prohibition of importation, production, and commercialization of genetically modified organisms and toxic elements that harm health and the environment” is listed as a guiding principle for all of Bolivia's contracted international relations. In Article 309, food sovereignty is listed as an objective with which state enterprises and entities should comply.

In Article 405, the first of Title III, comprehensive, sustainable rural development is noted as a fundamental priority of the State. According to the constitution, the State should prioritize “communitarian economic undertakings and those of the group of rural actors placing emphasis on food security and sovereignty” by the means of five principles. These are as follows:

1. The sustained and sustainable increase of agricultural, livestock, manufacturing, agro-industrial, and tourist industry productivity, as well as their commercial capacity.
2. The articulation and internal complementary form of the structures of agricultural, livestock and agro-industrial production.
3. Achievement of better conditions for economic exchange of the rural productive sector in relation to the rest of the Bolivian economy.
4. The importance and respect of the rural native indigenous communities in all dimensions of their life.
5. The strengthening of the economy of the small agricultural and livestock producers and of the family and communitarian economy.

Also in Title III, which is dedicated to comprehensive, sustainable rural development, the guarantee of food sovereignty is listed as an objective of state policy aimed at rural development in coordination with “autonomous and decentralized territorial entities”. Focal to this food sovereignty objective is the production and consumption of foods produced in Bolivia.

=== Other legislation ===
Bolivian Law 3525 or "Regulation and Promotion of Ecological Agricultural and Non-timber Forest Production" states food sovereignty as a right and details international and Bolivian certification systems.

Law 144, of Productive, Communal and Agricultural Revolution, bans GMO plant varieties for crops native to Bolivia, but not for those such as cotton, rice, sugar cane, and soy that are non-native and popular for export. There is debate among both state actors and indigenous and peasants groups that the GMO ban may make producing less accessible for small farmers and drive up food costs in internal markets.

The Mother Earth Law concerns food sovereignty in that it asserts nature's rights to be free from genetic modification and have its biodiversity be maintained. It aligns with indigenous food sovereignty logic in that it addresses value in traditional indigenous conceptions of nature as having an inherent right to sustainability and restoration.

== Philosophy, Politics, and Economics of Food Sovereignty in Bolivia ==
Food sovereignty, first coined by indigenous and peasant advocacy organization Vía Campesina, is the “right to produce, distribute, and consume nutritious, culturally appropriate food in a way that is ecologically sustainable” The goals of food sovereignty are to preserve agrobiodiversity, strengthen Bolivia's internal markets, renew social value for local foods, and secure more power for indigenous and peasant groups in deciding what they eat and how it is produced. In Bolivia, food sovereignty is part of a larger post-neoliberal, decolonized agenda of the state. Pestalozzi notes traditional agricultural systems are quite fluid and incorporate modern agricultural strategies, and that the goals of food sovereignty should be to allowed indigenous groups and farmers to produce and consume food as they wish and in accordance with their values regarding nature.

The success of agribusiness wholesale production in Bolivia has meant reduced labor returns and increased production costs for rural Bolivian families attempting to maintain plots on their own. This often obliges Bolivian families to search for off-farm supplementary income and means to provide consumer goods, or to migrate away from their farms altogether.

=== Historical Legacies of Exploitation ===
In Bolivia, an increase in agricultural monocropping to fulfill foreign and domestic market demands has exacerbated historically rooted tensions over the consolidation of land ownership and deforestation between indigenous peoples and peasant farmers on one side and wholesale producing agribusinesses on the other. These businesses use agrochemicals and monocropping that contrast traditional indigenous modes of production. Food sovereignty advocates trace the current food sovereignty struggle back to liberalization of trade and international investment in export-oriented agriculture, such as sugarcane plantations from the mid-twentieth century. Nicole Fabricant equates “early colonial pillaging” to “neocolonial policies of privatization and commodization of the most basic elements”. Small-scale Bolivian farmers and indigenous groups experience difficulty competing with businesses involved in this process and paying off loans acquired from attempts to also participate as a producer. Advocates argue against the power of export-oriented industries to define food production and for the right of the country's farmers and indigenous groups to do so. New waves of imported cheap and subsidized foods also fill local markets and make it difficult for domestic producers to compete locally or regionally.

=== Food Sovereignty and Indigeneity ===
Bolivian food sovereignty advocates from varied backgrounds of campesino and indigenous identification, take advantage of the now broad and landless global conception of indigeneity and indigenous rights to advocate for food sovereignty. Some argue, however, that the use of this discourse may actually only reinforce a class system in which indigenous peoples are viewed as a lower ring, powerless group. Migration from the Andes into the Bolivian lowlands, where many agroindustrial complexes have been built, has resulted in the mixing of indigenous knowledge systems and agricultural practices that provide a broad base for the food sovereignty struggle.

=== Food Sovereignty Motivations and Agendas ===
Various indigenous, peasant, government, and non-governmental organizations claim support for food sovereignty, though these groups act on different definitions and motivations. While state-sanctioned food sovereignty may support genetically modified food and agrochemicals, indigenous and peasant groups often do not. Government activities to support food sovereignty include providing training in particular agricultural practices and conducting research on different agriculture approaches. The UN Food and Agriculture Organization has also conducted similar research. Some argue that the state's conception of food sovereignty serves the purpose of maintaining profit stability as an independent nation and does not possess the same concern for the effects of resource extraction as indigenous groups. The indigenous and peasant advocacy organization Vía Campesina is active in Bolivia's food sovereignty movement. Four Bolivian organizations are affiliated with Vía Campesina, the Unified Syndical Confederation of Rural Workers of Bolivia (CSUTCB), the National Confederation of Indigenous Campesino and Native Women of Bolivia–Bartolina Sisa, the Syndicalist Confederation of Intercultural Communities of Bolivia, and the Landless Workers' Movement of Bolivia (MST-B). They advance the idea that food is primarily a people's resource and source of nutrition and should only secondarily be an item of trade.

=== Food Sovereignty versus Food Security ===
The Bolivian concept of “food sovereignty” differs from that of “food security”. While food security places emphasis on the quantity of food production and increasing access to food, sovereignty is concerned with how, where, and by whom food is produced and how Bolivian communities are affected by an increasingly foreign-influenced market. The food sovereignty ideal has gained traction as a framework for conserving agrobiodiversity, as well as an increased global interest in sustainable and organic agriculture.

== Indigenous knowledge systems ==
Bolivian, and particularly Andean, knowledge systems emphasize sharing food, appreciating producers, diversity, environmental risk management, and food security. These knowledge systems include the existence of Pachamama, or Mother Earth, as a sacred being.

=== Ayllu ===
The ayllu is one indigenous knowledge framework that has been discussed as a possible alternative model by which food production could be practiced in a food sovereign Bolivia. The traditional values of reciprocity, communal resource management, and food access are fundamental aspects of the ayllu. The ayllu system has been preserved over time by increased autonomy due to previous condemnation and marginalization in rural lands. The ayllu organizes people into units, focuses on the human as the center of production, and incorporates care and concern for the environment, risk management, and dietary diversity. Gender complementarity is a tenet of the ayllu system, however many women facing gender inequality today have faced difficulty incorporating their voices into the public forums on food sovereignty.

=== Aynuqa System ===
The aynuqa system balances cultivated land and fallow land through crop rotation in the Bolivian altiplano. Aynuqa plots are communally owned but individually worked and inherited. The plots are put through cycles of land used for crop cultivation, grazing, regrowth, and firewood collection. Communal walls around plots help to protect crops from animals and frost. The construction and use of communal walls lessens individual workload, maintenance costs, and allows farmers to take turns shepherding over their neighbor's animals. The aynuqa is managed by the ayllu system. Categorizations such as Lullu Laq'a, Samata, and Puruma are used to describe a given field's fertility and state of vegetation regrowth based on traditional knowledge.

In recent years, ayllus and aynuqas are disappearing due to migration and the intensification of quinoa production for export.

==== Sectoral Fallow Systems ====
By the fallow system, fields are cultivated for several years with one crop before being allowed to lie fallow for several more years before a new crop is introduced. Of up to hundreds of fields divided amongst farmers, only small subsets are cultivated at a time while others lie fallow. Yields may produce up to three times that of a non-fallow system Bolivian plot. During the fallow period, the vegetation regrowth is used for animal grazing.

Typically the first crop that is planted is potatoes. Later crops may include but are not limited to other varieties of potatoes, quinoa, oats, or barley. Despite soil with low nutrient content and harsh environmental conditions in the Andes, the fallow system creates conditions to reproduce soil nutrients and eventually high yields.

The fallow system incorporates traditional knowledge about soil fertility management with strategic use of newer technologies such as mineral fertilizer at their own discretion. The system not only helps achieve high yields but also sustainably preserves the land's ability to renew and regrow. At any given time, there are local men working in roles to ensure that the cultivate and fallow rules are being followed properly. Reduced workload, reduced pests, medicinal herb and plant product regeneration, and the mineralization of nutrients for the soil have all been documented as results of the cultivate and fallow system.

== Crops relevant to Food Sovereignty ==
=== Quinoa ===
Quinoa is a grain native to the Andean region that is high in protein content and micronutrients. It is capable of growing in the harsh climatic conditions of the Bolivian altiplano despite the high levels of frost, salinity, and drought. The crop has long been known for its nutritional value, and has indigenous symbolic meaning due to its long history within the region. It historically has been associated with poorer populations due to its rural use and origin. Preparation of quinoa for consumption is labor-intensive, particularly the removal of the grain's saponin covering. In the Bolivian Andes, farmers who are compelled to work away from home in order to supplement their own farm income do not have the proper amounts of time to prepare quinoa for their own home consumption, opting instead for cheaper foreign-subsidized breads and pastas.

There are many different varieties of quinoa, which vary in what type of environment best suited for their production. With quinoa's growing global popularity, Bolivian farmers have begun to grow the varieties that are favored in the export market rather than those best suited for home consumption. This means a nutritious product is grown in large quantities for export from a country with widespread malnutrition. There have been some attempts to reintroduce quinoa to Bolivia's population through encouragement of more consumption in the middle classes.

Foreign interests have patented many varieties of quinoa, and it is sold globally. Due to emphasis on export-oriented production, Bolivian farmers are increasingly excluded from control or consultation over quinoa genetic resources. As farmers are encouraged to cultivate market-favoring varieties, native varieties are put at risk of disappearance. As quinoa grows in popularity, the risk of biopiracy and patenting indigenous Andean genetic material increases. This possibility has influenced Bolivian farmers to be reluctant to work with scientist sand groups researching to improve quinoa varieties.

==== Public Perception ====
Historically, quinoa was stigmatized as a poor person's food and replaced by non-indigenous peoples with wheat, barley, and other popular European products. Quinoa has attracted interest in recent years as a potential solution to the food security crisis due to its high protein, micronutrients, and "rustic" characterization. Quinoa's ability to improve nutritional status for those living in poverty is still debated. Projects that have attempted to reintroduce quinoa to rural and impoverished populations have faced difficulty due to the high labor costs and time associated with cultivating quinoa as well as the continued lower-class perception of quinoa in Bolivia's urban middle class.

=== Soy ===
Many industrial farmers who originally invested in sugarcane plantations switched to the production of soy. The soy market is very profitable, as it is used globally to create biofuel as an alternative energy source. This shift to soy represents a transformation of Bolivian land use in which the land is used for wholesale production aimed at a global market rather than for subsistence or domestic uses. Small-scale Bolivian farmers and indigenous groups experience difficulty competing with businesses involved in this process and paying off loans acquired from attempts to also participate as a producer.

Much of Bolivia's soy and oilseed is produced in Bolivia's tropical eastern lowlands. More than 70% the department of Santa Cruz is devoted to soy production. As a non-native crop, GMO soy seeds are not banned in Bolivia, as is the case of other non-native crops such as cotton, rice, and sugar cane.

=== Wheat Imports ===
Imports of wheat from North American countries, in the form of food aid and subsidized commercial product, dwarf the production of traditional Bolivian crops such as quinoa. These imports, as well as reduced tariffs on imports to these areas, are put in place to help feed Bolivia's poor. The low prices of these subsidized foods means traditional and native crops are not able to compete as crops for national subsistence. Traditional crops thus become targets for export rather than internal consumption. These wheat-based foods are generally less nutritionally dense but easier and cheaper to acquire and consume.

On example of food sovereignty policy is the "Enterprise for Support in Food Production" (EMAPA), established by the Bolivian government during the 2007-2009 food crisis. A rise in international food prices, particularly for grains and oilseed, left poorer nations such as Bolivia vulnerable food insecurity. To combat this and stabilize domestic consumer prices, EMAPA subsidized fertilizer, made and purchased wheat, and distributed subsidized wheat flour in larger Bolivian towns. EMAPA's ultimate purpose was to decrease Bolivia's dependence on the stability of the international food market. According to Schüttel, EMAPA was not ultimately successful in shielding Bolivia from international price shocks.
