= Nyéléni =

Nyéléni was a woman from Sirakoro in Mali, Africa. During the first International Food Sovereignty Forum, which took place in Sélingué, Mali, in February 2007, it was decided to name the network for Food Sovereignty in her honour.
