= Carlo Musso =

American physician

Carlo Musso is an emergency physician working in Georgia. He has participated in executions by lethal injection as part of a medical team assisting Georgia state prison personnel to carry out the procedure.

== Views on capital punishment ==
Musso is personally opposed to the death penalty, but says that he sees lethal injection as an "end-of-life issue, just as with any other terminal disease. It just happens that it involves a legal process instead of a medical process. When we have a patient who can no longer survive his illness, we as physicians must ensure he has comfort. [A death-penalty] patient is no different from a patient dying of cancer—except his cancer is a court order.”

== Criticism ==
In part because participation by physicians in executions is forbidden by the code of ethics of the American Medical Association, Musso has come under criticism for his actions. In June 2011, the Southern Center for Human Rights filed complaints against Musso with the Georgia Composite Medical Board, alleging that he had illegally imported sodium thiopental, one of the key substances used in executions by lethal injection. The complaints further alleged that Musso sold the sodium thiopental to the states of Kentucky and Tennessee without the requisite licenses from the DEA.

== See also ==
- Participation of medical professionals in American executions
