= Arepera Socialista =

Venezuelan fast food restaurant chain

Arepera Socialista was a chain of fast food restaurants operated by the government of Venezuela, featuring arepas (a thick, moist cousin of tortillas, filled with meat, cheese, or other ingredients).

The company was started in 2009 as a government response to the high cost of private restaurants in Caracas, Venezuela. It sold arepas at 25% of the cost of private businesses, a discount the government said was made possible by the use of government-owned suppliers.

In one of the secret diplomatic cables released as part of the United States diplomatic cables leak in 2010, a United States embassy staff member described the enterprise as one of "Socialism's Tangible -- and Tasty -- Benefits".
