= Musou =

Musou or Musō may refer to:

- The Japanese name for the Koei Tecmo Warriors franchise
  - Musou gauge, used in the Samurai Warriors series of video games
  - Musou mode, used in the Dynasty Warriors series of video games
- Muso (InuYasha), a minor character from InuYasha

People with the surname Musō include:

- Musō Soseki (1275–1351), Japanese Zen master
- Musō Gonnosuke, early 17th-century samurai
