= Five Acres and Independence =

Book about self-sustainable small-scale farming

Five Acres and Independence: A practical guide to the selection and management of the small farm
- Author: Maurice Grenville Kains
- Language: English
- Genre: Non-fiction
- Publication date: 1935
- Publication place: United States

Five Acres and Independence: A practical guide to the selection and management of the small farm is a book about self-sustainable small-scale farming, written by Maurice Grenville Kains. It was first published in 1935 during the Great Depression. It was written to provide practical information for people such as urban factory workers who had never worked on a farm. The book contains 46 chapters on all types of farming practices.
