= Sélingué =

Town in Yanfolila Cercle, Sikasso Region, Mali

Coordinates: 11.6428°N 8.1922°W

Sélingué is a town in Yanfolila Cercle, Sikasso Region, Mali. It is located on the north shore of Lake Sélingué, near the Sélingué Dam on the Sankarani River. The main economic activities in Sélingué are farming, fishing, and commerce. There are also a branch of Mali power company "Energie du Mali" and the office of (ODRS) Office pour le Developpement Rural de Selingue.

== See also ==
- Nyéléni, a nearby village
