= Muso Health =

Nonprofit organisation in Mali

Muso is a 501(c)(3) global health organization based in Mali. Created in 2005, by a group of Malian and American collaborators, including the following still active team leaders Dr. Djoumé Diakité, Moise Samaké, Dr. Jessica Beckerman, and Dr. Ari Johnson, of San Francisco General Hospital. Muso has developed a proactive Community Case Management (Pro-CCM) healthcare delivery model, intended to reduce child mortality and improve early access to care.

As a result of this model, Muso achieved a ten-fold reduction in child mortality in their site of intervention in Yirimadjo, Mali, between 2008 and 2013, as documented in a 2013 study by researchers at Harvard, the University of California San Francisco, and Mali's Ministry of Health.

== The Muso Pro-CCM Model ==
Muso developed a three-step Pro-CCM healthcare system designed to reduce child mortality.

The steps are:

1. Proactive Search: CHWs and community members search for patients through door-to-door home visits to connect them with care early.
2. Doorstep Care: CHWs provide a package of health care services in the home. These include family planning, newborn screening, and treatment for children with malaria, diarrhea, and malnutrition.
3. Rapid-Access Clinics: CHWs refer patients who need more care than Muso's CHWs are able to provide in the home to government primary care clinics. Muso removes point-of-care user fees, so that government clinics can provide universal, early access to care. User-fees to access health care were shown to negatively impact healthcare seeking behavior.

== Three-Year PLOS One Study ==
In 2013, the Muso Pro-CCM model was tested in a study by Harvard, the University of California San Francisco, and the Malian Ministry of Health. The study team conducted a randomized household cross- sectional survey in Muso communities at baseline, 12, 24, and 36 months.

Outcomes were defined as the percentage of children initiating an effective antimalarial within 24 hours of symptom onset, the percentage of children reported to be febrile within the previous two weeks, and the under-five child mortality rate. After three years of the intervention, the hazard of under-five mortality in the intervention area was one tenth that of baseline (HR 0.10, p<0.0001). The prevalence of febrile illness among children under five was significantly lower, from 38.2% at baseline to 23.3% in 2011 (PR = 0.61, p = 0.0009). The percentage of children starting an effective antimalarial within 24 hours of symptom onset was nearly twice that reported at baseline (PR = 1.89, p = 0.0195).

The study concluded that community health workers can save many lives, even with limited training. It is not clear, however, the extent to which the model can be replicated as it received funding from outside sources. In addition, basic infrastructure, like water delivery, was added, and residents received free medical care.

== Partnership with the Malian Ministry of Health ==
Muso and the Ministry of Health committed to testing this model at scale, serving 250,000 people across nine sites in Mali. Along with this scale-up, a randomized controlled trial will measure the impact of proactive care on universal health coverage and child survival.

== Supporters ==
Muso has received funding from Mulago Foundation, Jasmine Social Investments, Draper Richards Kaplan Foundation, and Child Relief International, among others.
