= Michael Morales (murderer) =

American murderer on death row

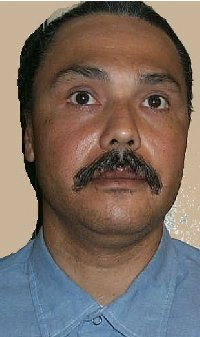
- Born: Michael Angelo Morales; October 17, 1959 (age 66); San Joaquin County, California, United States
- Status: Incarcerated
- Motive: Love triangle
- Convictions: First degree murder with special circumstances Conspiracy to commit murder Forcible rape
- Penalty: Death (de jure)

Details
- Victims: Terri Winchell, 17
- Date: January 8, 1981

Michael Angelo Morales (born October 17, 1959) is an American convicted murderer who was scheduled to be executed by the State of California on February 21, 2006. Two hours before the scheduled execution, the State of California notified the 9th Circuit Court of Appeals that they could not comply with a lower federal judge's ruling that the execution must be carried out by a medical professional due to the chemical used in the execution. Consequently, California has indefinitely suspended Morales's execution. The case subsequently led to a moratorium on capital punishment in California entirely, as the only legal method of execution must be carried out with the participation of a licensed physician, who are ethically prohibited from participating in executions.

== Murder of Terri Winchell ==
Morales was convicted of raping and murdering 17-year-old Terri Winchell on January 8, 1981. Winchell was in a love triangle with Richard Ortega- a cousin of Morales- and another man. Ortega hired Morales to kill Winchell so that Ortega could have exclusive relations with his male lover. According to prosecutors, Morales attacked Winchell from behind and tried to strangle her with his belt. Morales then hit her head with a hammer 23 times, beating her into unconsciousness and crushing her skull. Saying he couldn't "waste a piece of good ass," Morales then dragged Winchell face-down across the road and into a vineyard, where he raped her and stabbed her four times in the chest. Winchell died from both the head and chest wounds. Afterwards, Morales stole $11 from Winchell's purse and partied.

=== Trial and appeals ===
Morales has not denied that he committed the crime. His defense team argued, however, that since he was high on PCP at the time, the murder does not qualify for the "special circumstances" required by California state law for the death penalty. Morales' defense argued that the crime was not premeditated, despite the fact that he had told Ortega that he would defend him. The prosecution countered with evidence showing that Morales gathered tools before the encounter, practiced strangulation on two female acquaintances, and confessed to an informant while in jail.

Charles McGrath, the judge who originally sentenced Morales to execution, has announced that he has had a change of heart in the case. He now says he now doubts the testimony of an informant against Morales. Notably, the informant claimed that Morales confessed to him in Spanish, a language Morales does not speak. McGrath asked Gov. Arnold Schwarzenegger to grant Morales clemency under state law. In addition, Morales has claimed that he has found God in prison, and regrets the crime that he committed.

In early 2006, lead defense attorney David Senior hired former Whitewater special prosecutor Kenneth Starr to be one of Morales' attorneys on the appeals. Immediately prior to Morales' execution date, Senior filed papers claiming that five out of the 12 jurors had doubts about sentencing him to death. However, prosecutors alleged that the documents were forgeries, and accused investigator and anti-death penalty activist Kathleen Culhane of falsifying the documents in the cases of Morales and others. Senior and his team soon withdrew the documents. Ultimately, clemency was denied, but the falsified documents were not used in the rationale. Eventually, Culhane was criminally charged with forging the documents and, under a plea agreement, was sentenced to five years in prison for two counts of forgery, one count of perjury, and one count of filing false documents. At her sentencing hearing, Culhane refused to express remorse to the State of California, stating her acts were crimes of conscience against Morales' execution and the death penalty.

== Postponed execution ==
Morales' original execution date of February 21, 2006, was postponed as a result of two court-appointed anesthesiologists withdrawing from the procedure. This is the first death row inmate extant since a judge ruled that the current combination of drugs may cause severe pain, as corroborated by an April 2005 study published in The Lancet. The doctors cited ethical reasons for the decision to withdraw. They had been ordered by the court to intervene in the event Morales woke up or appeared to be in pain. Since both doctors withdrew, California planned to overdose Morales on intravenous barbiturates, the only other option allowed by the court.

The judge further ruled that the barbiturates could only be administered by a "licensed medical professional," meaning a doctor, nurse or other medical technician legally authorized to administer I.V. medications. Since all such medical personnel are bound by professional ethics against performing an execution, this ruling virtually assured that the execution could not take place. Having failed to find a medical professional willing to carry out the execution, California decided it could not comply with the judge's decision and would allow the death warrant to lapse. The death warrant will now have to be re-issued by the original trial judge, Charles McGrath, who has indicated that he no longer believes testimony from the 1982 trial and asked for clemency for Morales.

== See also ==
- List of death row inmates in the United States § California
