= Guala =

Guala may refer to:

== People ==
- Guala Bicchieri (c. 1150 – 1227), Italian diplomat and papal legate in England
- Guala de Roniis (1180–1244), Dominican bishop of Brescia
- Guala da Telgate bishop of Bergamo
- Sebastiano Guala, Italian church architect active in the years 1640–1680
- Pier Francesco Guala, also known as Pierfrancesco and Pietro Francesco (1698–1757), Italian Baroque painter

== Places ==
- Gaula River (Sør-Trøndelag)
