= Ottavi =

Ottavi is an Italian surname. Notable people with the surname include:

- Ottavio Ottavi (1849–1893), Italian oenologist
- Paolo Ottavi (born 1986), Italian artistic gymnast
