= Ottavio Ottavi =

Italian oenologist (1849–1893)

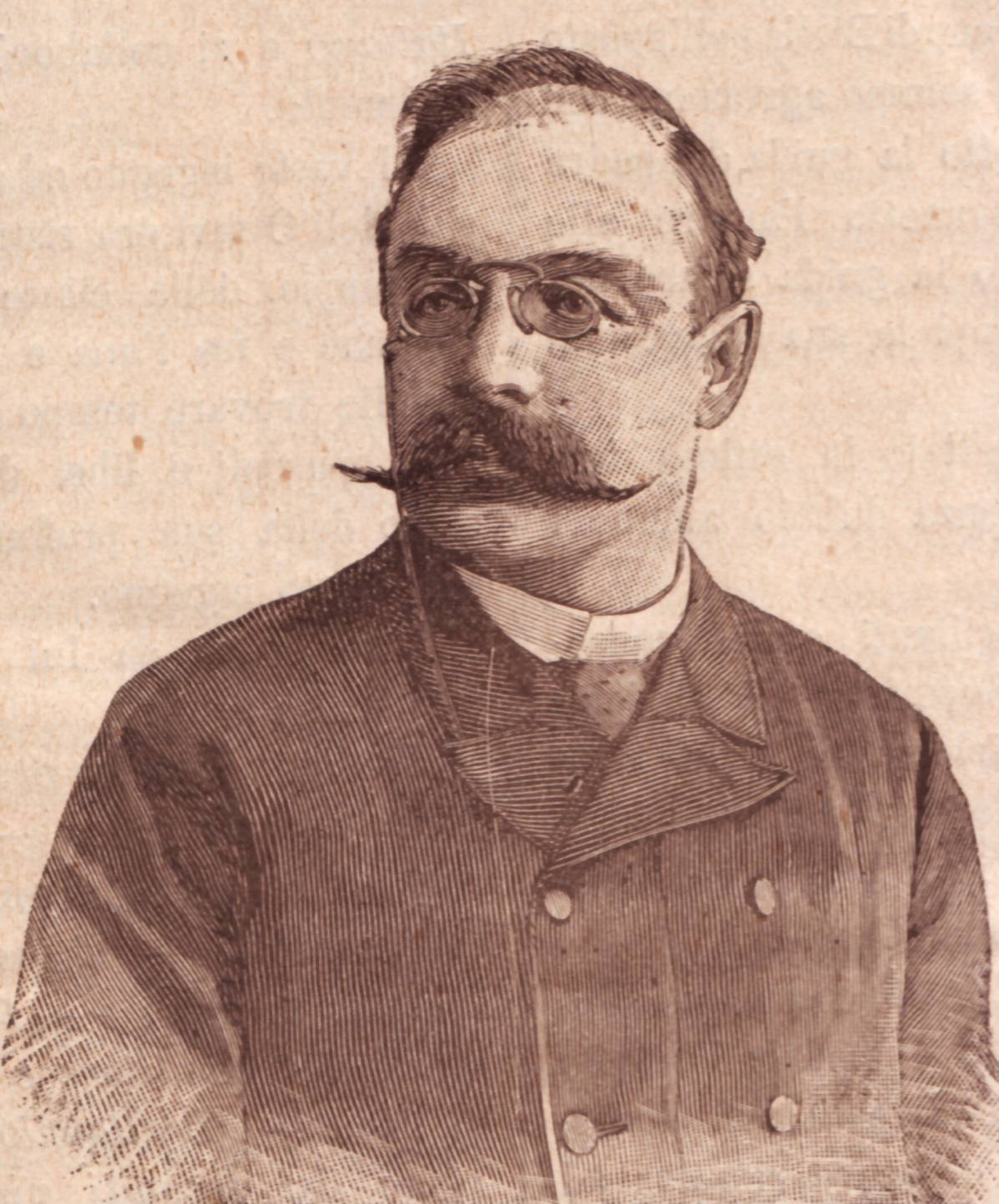
Ottavio Ottavi.

Ottavio Ottavi (15 August 1849 – 12 January 1893) was an Italian oenologist.

== Biography ==
Ottavi was born in Sandigliano. His father Giuseppe Antonio Ottavio was an agronomist, and his brother Edoardo, editor of the journal Il Coltivatore, was also seen as a significant figure in the development of nineteenth-century Italian viticulture.

He was the author of various treatises and monographs, including Enologia teorico-pratica (1898), and was the founder of the Giornale vinicolo italiano. His Inno ai Krumiri (1886) is a "hymn" to the krumiro, a type of biscuit created in Casale Monferrato, the town where he largely lived and where he died in 1893.
