= Sebastiano Guala =

Italian architect

Sebastiano Guala was an Italian church architect active between 1640 and 1680 in the area of Casale Monferrato, then capital of the Gonzaga-ruled state of Montferrat. He was born into a prominent family of Frassinello Monferrato and became a canon of the Collegiata di Santa Maria di Piazza in Casale. It has been thought probable that he belonged to the same family as the Casalese painter Pier Francesco Guala (1698–1757).

== Works ==
Churches attributed to Guala include:

At Frassinello
The chapel of San Bernardo, of unplastered brick and located in the open countryside.
The chiesa parocchiale dell’Assunta, rebuilt by Guala in 1650/60.
At Casale
San Giuseppe in Via Lanza.
Santo Stefano (1653) in Piazza Santo Stefano.
San Filippo in Via Biblioteca.
Santa Maria sulle Mura (also Madonna di Pompei and La Madonnina) in Viale Morozzo, with a secondary entrance from Via Saletta, was built in 1675 to contain a fresco of the Madonna upon which ‘miraculous’ tears had been observed. The image, which also depicts the infant Jesus and Saint Evasio, was painted in 1615 by Selvino Bolognesi.
At Pozzo Sant’Evasio
The small church of Pozzo Sant’Evasio, near Casale, was built in 1666/1670 on the site of the miraculous fountain of Saint Evasio to commemorate a 1640 victory over the Spanish forces which were besieging Casale. The patron was Giovanni Domenico Polatto, president of the senate at Casale.

== Notes and references ==
=== References ===
- Amelotti, Raffaella (28 March 2003), Inquadramento paesaggistico e storico-culturale del Parco Fluviale del Po vercellese alessandrino (PDF), ENEA
- Associazione Turistica Pro Loco (n.d.), Arte, Frassinello Monferrato
- Cattedrale di Casale Monferrato (2006-11-30), Sant'Evasio, le Reliquie, la leggenda e la storia, archived from the original on 2007-04-22
- Comune di Livorno Ferraris (n.d.), Uomini Illustri
- Cravino, Mario (2004), Frassinello, ilmonferrato.info
- Grignolio, Idro (1983), Casale Monferrato, Casale Monferrato: Media editrice
- Legambiente (n.d.), "Casale Monferrato", L'Italia del Cigno
- Liceo Scientifico Palli (n.d.), Pietro Francesco Guala, Casale Monferrato, archived from the original on 2006-05-14
- Mazza, Germana, ed. (2002), Casale città aperta, Casale Monferrato: Museo Civico
