= Niccolò Musso =

Italian painter

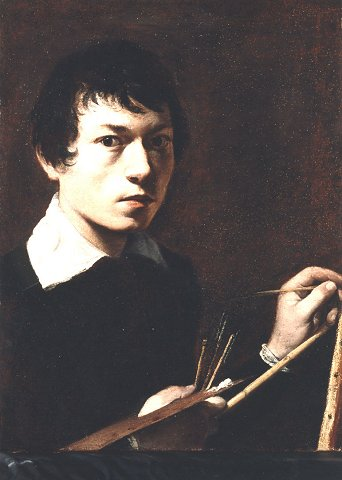
Niccolò Musso, Self-portrait. Museo Civico, Casale Monferrato.

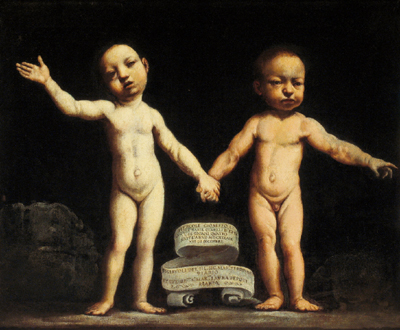
Portrait of the Twins Ercole Gioseffo and Angiola Maria Riario Sforza. Oil on canvas, 55 x 67 cm. After 1619.

Niccolò Musso (active 1618) was an Italian painter of the Baroque period.

He was mostly active in his natal city of Casale Monferrato. He is said to have trained or worked under either Caravaggio for ten years in Rome (Orlandi) or by local tradition under the Carracci in Bologna (Lanzi). He painted for the church of St. Francis in Casale Monferato, representing that saint at the feet of Christ crucified, and angels partaking in his lamentations and devotions. The painting is now in the church of Sant’Ilario. He painted a self-portrait which is in the picture gallery of the Museo Civico at Casale. He is also called Niccolo Musso.
