= Francesco Ottavio Magnocavalli =

Italian architect and writer

Francesco Ottavio Magnocavalli, also spelt Magnocavallo (1707–1789) was an Italian architect and writer.

Born in Casale Monferrato to Ippolito, count of Varengo (today part of the commune of Gabiano) and the countess Veronica Pico Pastrona, he studied at a Jesuit college in Parma. On his return to Casale, he established himself as an essayist, dramatist and poet, before adopting the career for which he is best known, as an architect. He worked on a number of palazzi in Casale and designed churches throughout Monferrato.

In 1738 he married Maria Felice, daughter of the Count of Salmour.
