= Casale Monferrato =

- Comune
- Comune di Casale Monferrato
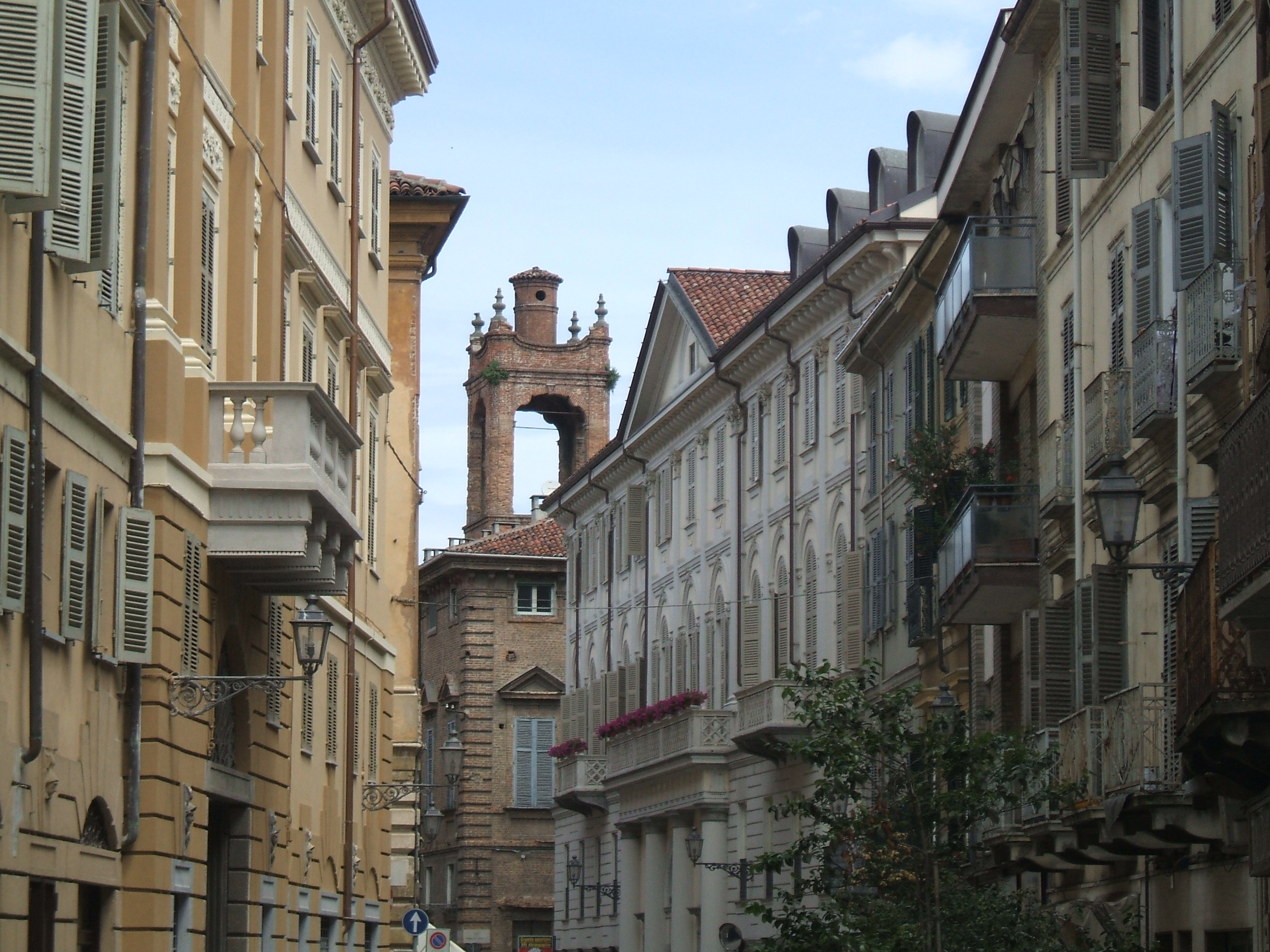
- Via Lanza

- Flag Coat of arms

- Location of Casale Monferrato in Italy Casale Monferrato (Piedmont)
- Coordinates: 45°08′N 08°27′E
- Country: Italy
- Region: Piedmont
- Province: Alessandria (AL)
- Frazioni: Popolo, Pozzo Sant'Evasio, Roncaglia, San Germano, Santa Maria Del Tempio, Terranova, Cantone Bassotti, Cantone Cerreto, Cantone Il Rondò, Cantone La Cascinetta, Cantone La Ceriella, Cantone Losa, Cantone Rossi, Cantone Vallare, Castellino, I Dossi, Rolasco, Vialarda, Villa Sordi

Government
  - Mayor: Emanuele Capra

Area
  - Total: 86.21 km^{2} (33.29 sq mi)
- Elevation: 116 m (381 ft)

Population (1 January 2021)
  - Total: 33,213
  - Density: 385.3/km^{2} (997.8/sq mi)
- Demonym: Casalesi or Casalaschi
- Time zone: UTC+1 (CET)
  - Summer (DST): UTC+2 (CEST)
- Postal code: 15033
- Dialing code: 0142
- Patron saint: St. Evasius
- Saint day: 12 November
- Website: Official website

Casale Monferrato (Italian pronunciation: [kaˈzaːle moɱferˈraːto]) is a town in the Piedmont region of northwestern Italy, in the province of Alessandria. It is situated about 60 km (37 mi) east of Turin on the right bank of the Po, where the river runs at the foot of the Montferrat hills. Beyond the river lies the vast plain of the Po valley.

An ancient Roman municipium, the town has been the most important trade and manufacturing centre of the area for centuries. After the fall of the Roman Empire, Casale became a free municipality and, in the 15th and early 16th centuries, served as the capital of the House of Palaiologos. Then in 1536, the town passed to the Gonzagas who fortified it with a large citadel. In the 17th century, Casale was heavily involved in the War of the Mantuan Succession and besieged by French and Spanish troops. During the wars of Italian unification the town was a defensive bulwark against the Austrian Empire.

In the 1900s Casale, in the middle of the Turin-Milan-Genoa industrial triangle, developed as an important industrial centre, especially known for the production of lime and cement.

Furthermore, the asbestos cement industry has also developed. A local Eternit factory has been at the centre of a massive environmental scandal, with subsequent high-profile litigation that often made international headlines.

== History ==
=== Antiquity and Middle Ages ===
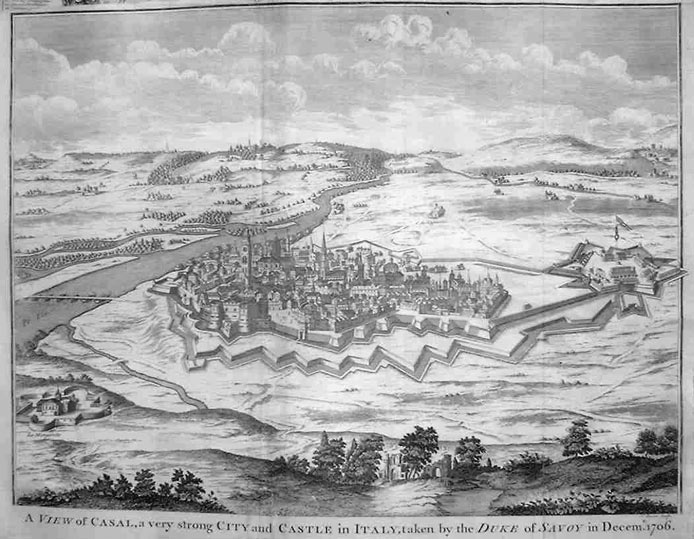
The fortified town from an engraving of 1745. On the left the river Po, and to the right the star-shaped cittadella

The origins of the town are fairly obscure. It is known that the Gaulish settlement of Vardacate (from var = "water"; ate = "populated place") existed on the Po in this area, and that it became a Roman municipium. By the beginning of the 8th century, there was a small town under Lombard rule, probably called Sedula or Sedulia. It was here (according to late and unreliable accounts) that one Saint Evasius, along with 146 followers, was decapitated on the orders of the Arian Duke Attabulo. Liutprand, King of the Lombards is said to have supported the construction of a church in honour of Evasius. Certainly, the martyr's cult flourished, and by 988 AD, the town had become known as Casale di Sant’Evasio.

At the time of Charlemagne, the town came under the temporal and religious power of the bishops of Vercelli, from which it was freed by Frederick Barbarossa, Holy Roman Emperor and King of Italy. It was sacked by the anti-imperial troops of Vercelli, Alessandria and Milan in 1215, but rebuilt and fortified in 1220. It fell under the power of the Marquess of Montferrat in 1292, (although it was conquered by the Visconti of Milan in 1370, it remained under their control until 1404) and later became the capital of the marquessate.

The condottiere Facino Cane was born in Casale Monferrato and he participated, financed by the Duke of Milan Gian Galeazzo Visconti, in the Battle of Casalecchio in 1402, but Theodore II, Marquess of Montferrat, the son of Isabella of Majorca, did not participate. Gian Galeazzo spent 300,000 golden florins attempting to turn from their courses the river Mincio from the city of Mantua, but Gian Galeazzo died.

In 1536 it passed to the Gonzagas of Mantua, who fortified it strongly. Thereafter it was of considerable importance as a fortress and was besieged during the Mantuan War of Succession.

=== Late modern and contemporary ===
In 1745, following the defeat of the Piedmontese army at the Battle of Bassignano during the War of the Austrian Succession, Casale was occupied by the victorious French and Spanish troops. Much damage was caused to the city's buildings. The subsequent renovation and rebuilding in the Baroque style made a substantial contribution to the urban texture.

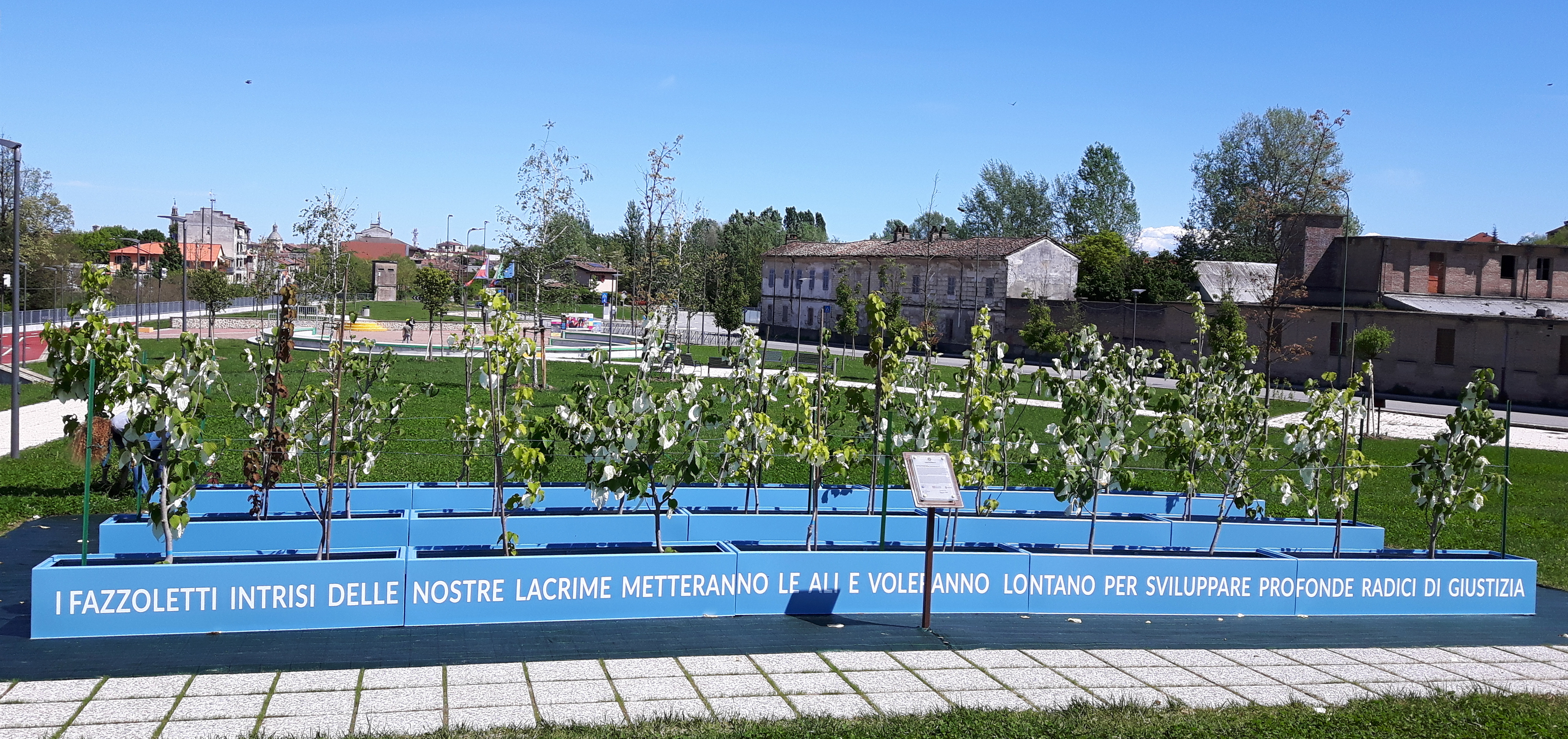
Memorial to asbestos victims on the former Eternit factory site. There is written: "The handkerchiefs soaked in our tears will put on wings and fly far to develop deep roots of justice".

During the Wars of Italian Independence, it successfully resisted the Austrians in 1849 and was strengthened in 1852.

The vast limestone deposits in the hills nearby caused, in the late 19th and early 20th centuries, several concrete factories to open up in the town. Casale became known as the "cement capital of Italy".

Indeed, the city had the merit of being the first Italian city to develop industrial cement production, thanks to the richness and quality of the Monferrato marl suitable, without the addition of correctives, for the manufacture of natural cement.

==== Newspaper ====
Lo Spettatore del Monferrato (‘The Monferrato Spectator’) was a regionally focused periodical published weekly from 1852 to 1855 in Casale Monferrato, north-west Italy, and printed by Tipografia Corrado.

==== Eternit asbestos disaster ====
From 1907 to 1986, Casale was the site of a large Eternit factory, that produced the homonymous asbestos cement, whose operations resulted in a massive environmental disaster, linked to the death of some 1,800 people from mesothelioma and other asbestos-related diseases in the area: in spite of former Eternit owner Stephan Schmidheiny and his associate, Jean-Louis de Cartie, being convicted and ordered to pay tens of millions of euros in compensation by the Turin Appeal Court in 2012, the Italian Supreme Court in 2014 declared that the statute of limitations had expired in the case.

== Main sights ==
=== Piazza Mazzini and its environs ===
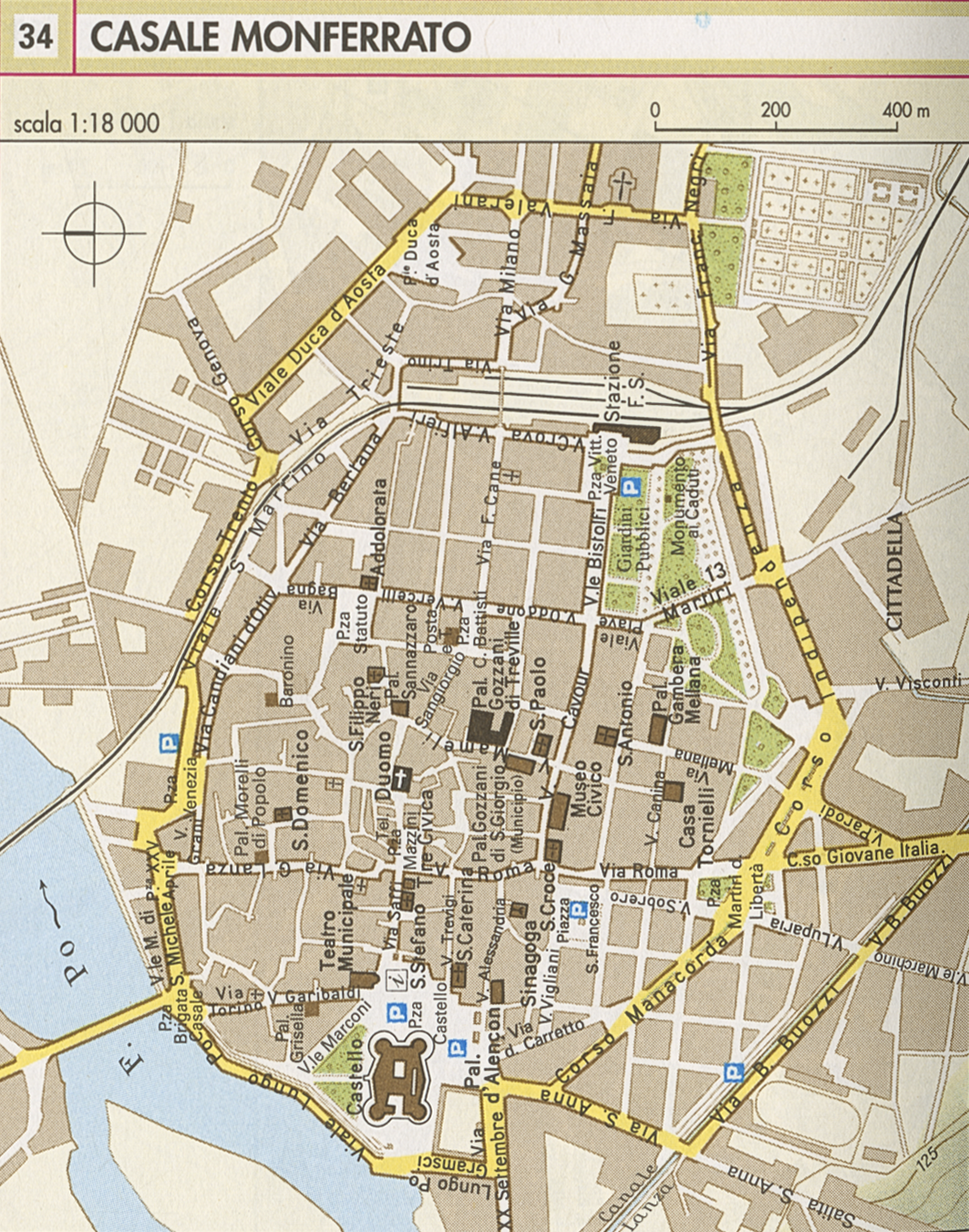
Map of city centre

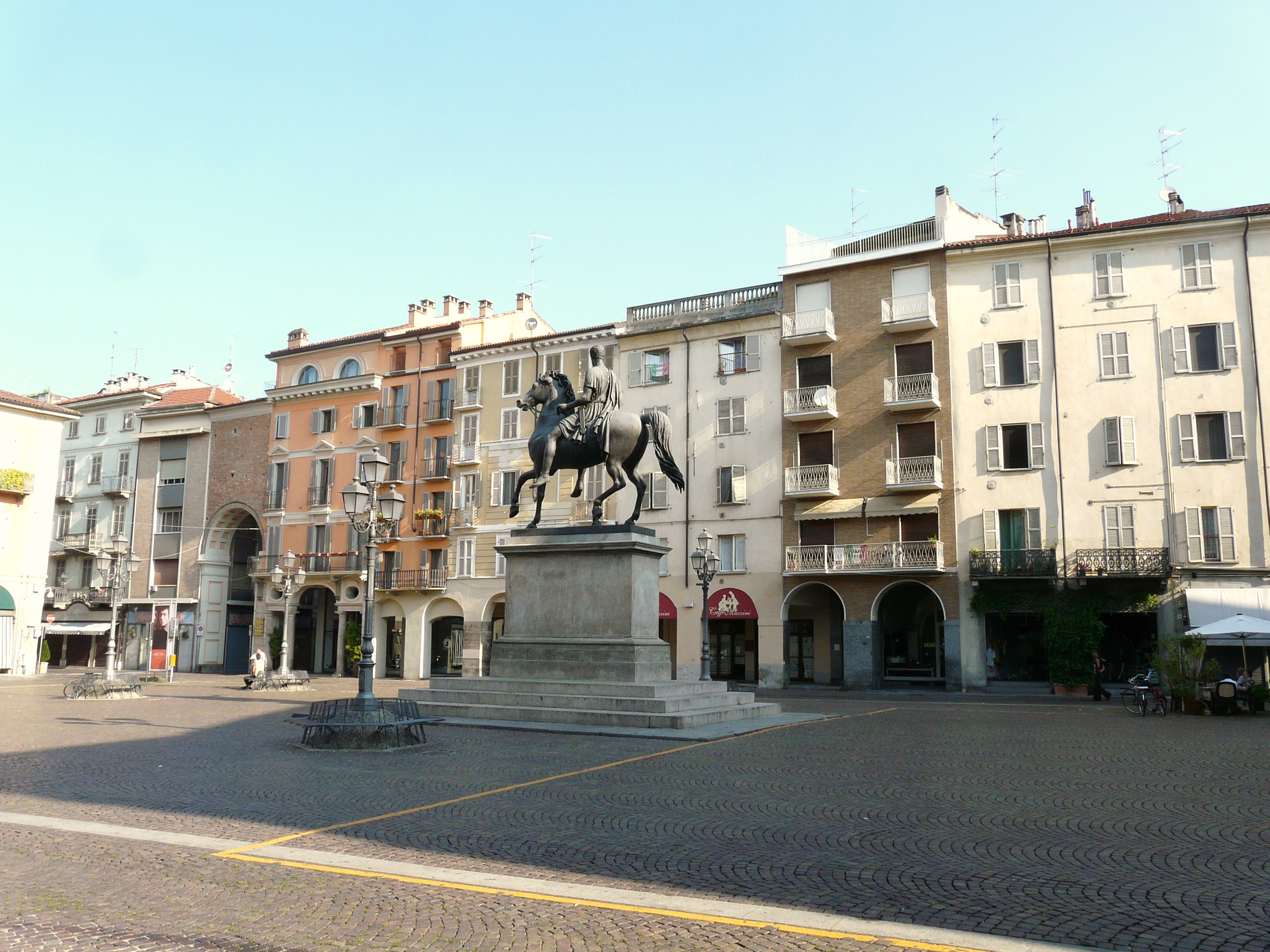
Piazza Mazzini

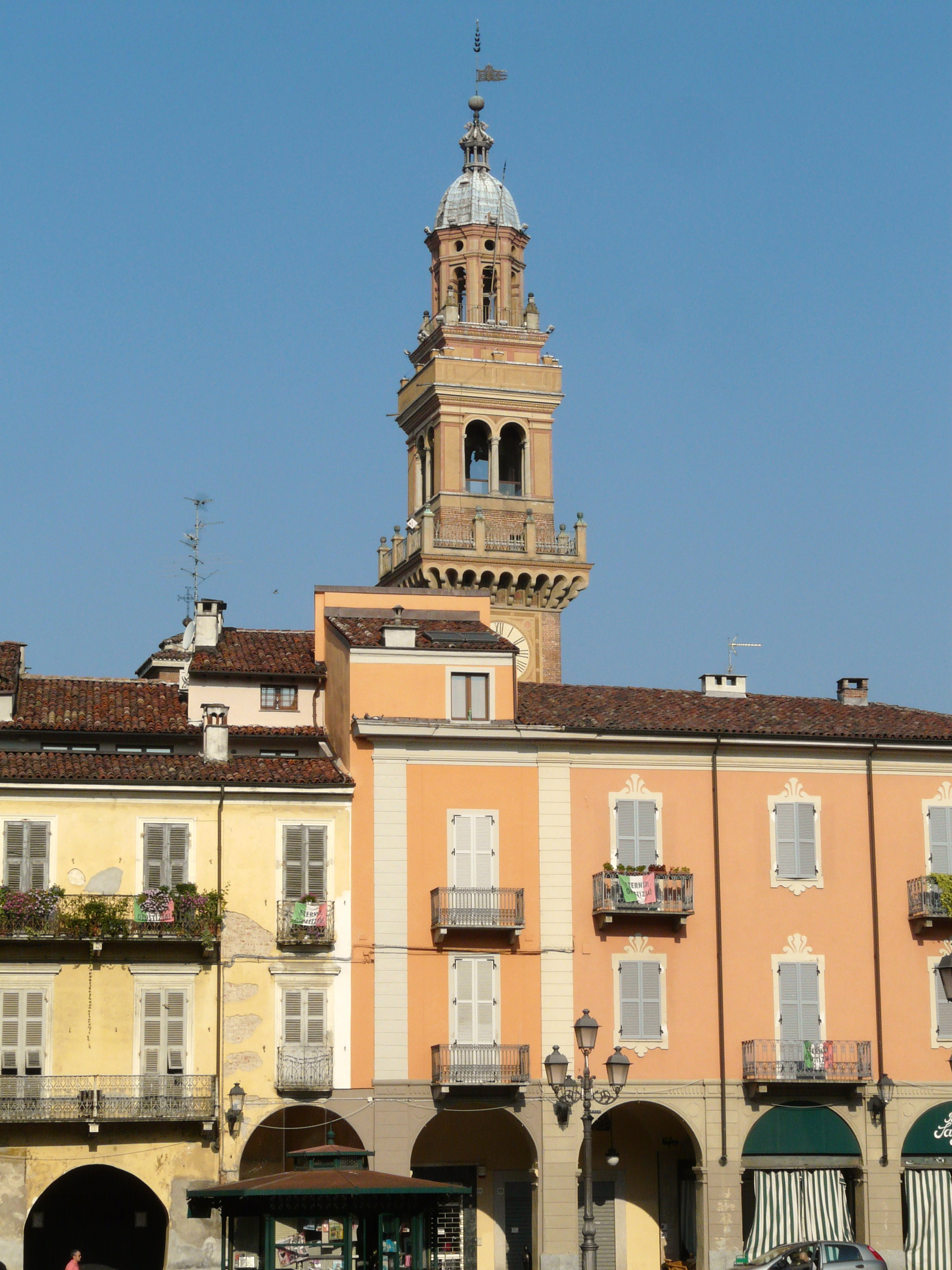
The Torre Civica

The historic centre of the town is itself centred on Piazza Mazzini, the site of the Roman forum. Named for Giuseppe Mazzini, a key republican figure of the Risorgimento, it is dominated by an 1843 equestrian statue by Abbondio Sangiorgio of King Charles Albert of Piedmont-Sardinia, dressed in Roman costume, specifically as a senator, with his knees uncovered. The statue was commissioned by the municipal authorities as a mark of gratitude to the king for having selected Casale as the seat of Piedmont's second Court of Appeal and to celebrate the construction of Casale's first permanent bridge across the Po. Locally the square is called Piazza Cavallo (wiktionary:cavallo being the Italian word for "horse").

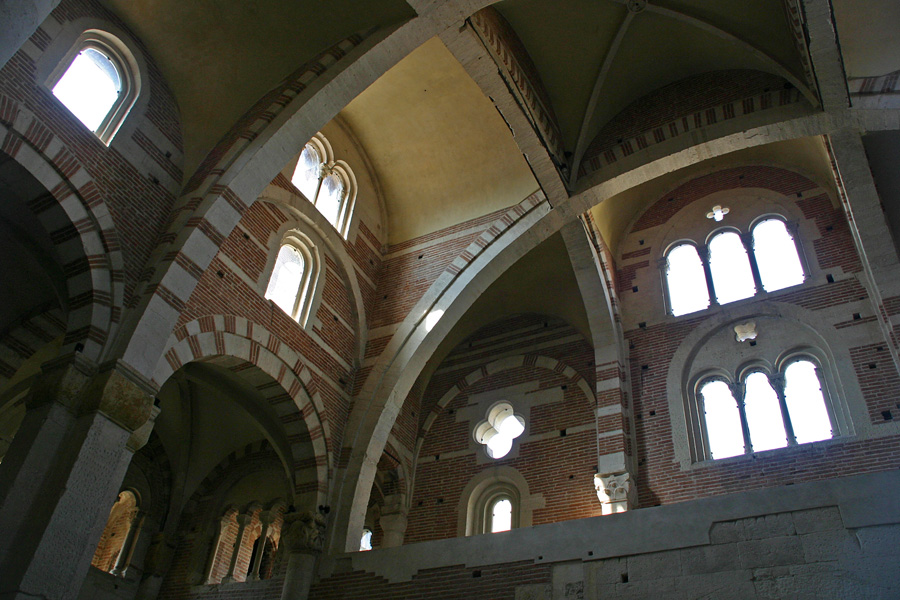
The Cathedral's narthex

==== Duomo ====
A little to the east of the square is the Lombard Romanesque cathedral of Sant'Evasio, founded in 742, rebuilt in the early 12th century and consecrated on 7 January 1107 by Pope Paschal II. It occupies a site where once was a Roman temple dedicated to Jupiter. It underwent restoration in 1706 and again in the 19th century. The cathedral has an asymmetric façade, including a complex narthex with two galleries (matronaei) connected by a tribune and closed by round arches. The interior houses the relics of Saint Evasius and, near the presbytery, fragments of 11th-century pavement mosaics with Biblical scenes (now remounted on the walls of the corridor from the apse to the sacristy).

==== San Domenico ====
In 1471, after William VIII, Marquess of Montferrat had chosen Casale as the permanent location of the marquisate court, construction began of the church of San Domenico, to the north of Piazza Mazzini. Work on the building ceased for some time, as a result of political instability; in the early 16th century a fine, if slightly incongruous, Renaissance portal was imposed on the late Gothic façade.

==== Via Lanza ====
Via Lanza, which runs northwards from the north-west corner of Piazza Mazzini, is known for the Krumiri Rossi bakery, which indeed produces Krumiri: biscuits which have been a speciality of Casale since their legendary invention in 1870 by one Domenico Rossi after an evening spent with friends in Piazza Mazzini's Caffè della Concordia (now a bank). Also in Via Lanza is the 17th-century church of San Giuseppe, probably designed by Sebastiano Guala; a painting attributed to the Ursuline nun Lucrina Fetti (c.1614–1651, brother of Domenico) shows Christ venerated by Sant’Evasio and includes a very accurate depiction of contemporary Casale with its civic tower. The church and convent of San Francesco, which housed the remains of many of the Marquises of Monferrato, was turned to other uses during the 18th century and demolished in the nineteenth. The high open tower which is a landmark of Via Lanza belongs to Palazzo Morelli di Popolo; it has been attributed to Bernardo Vittone, and also to Magnocavalli—both are believed to have had a hand in the refurbishment of the building.

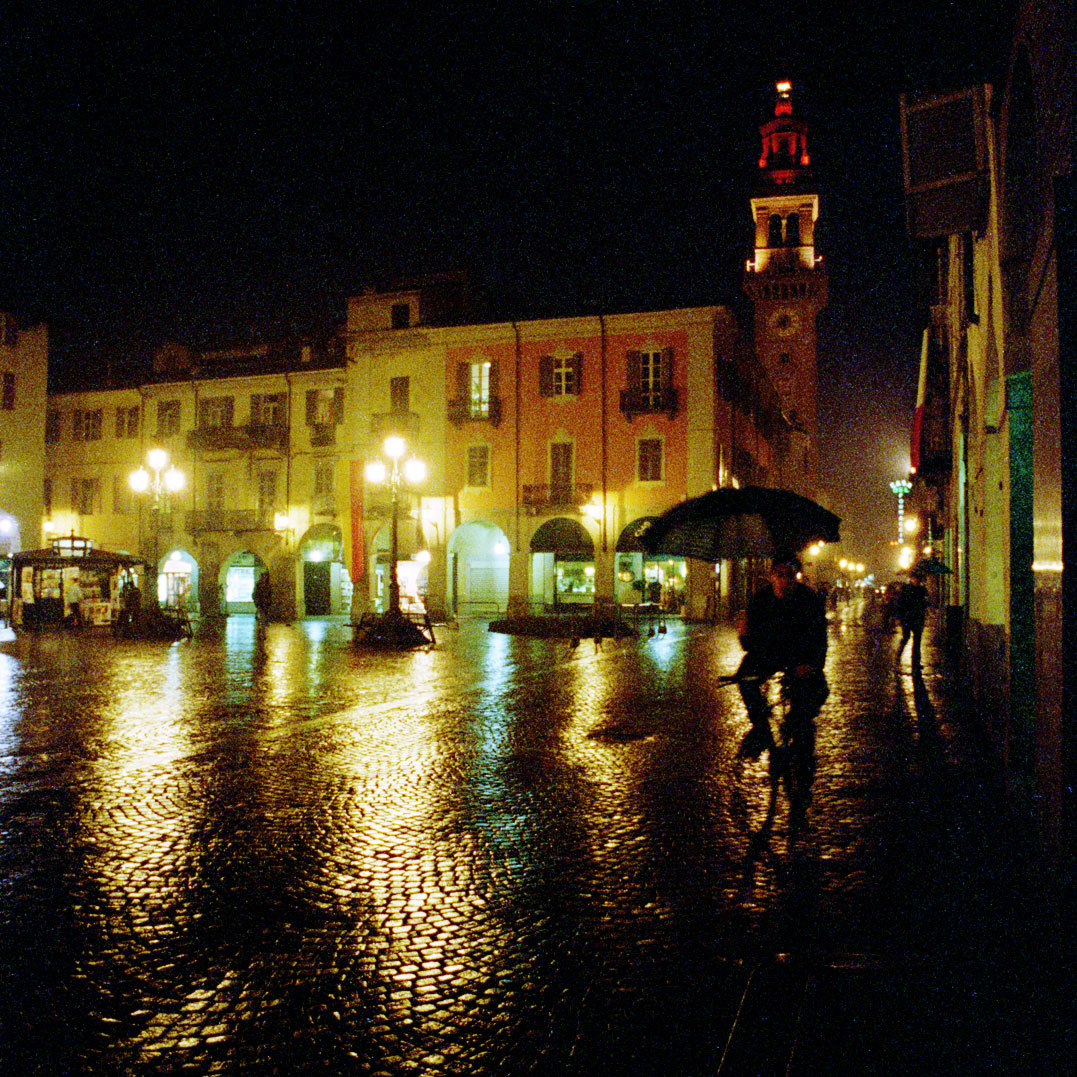
Piazza Mazzini; in the background Via Saffi leads past the civic tower towards Piazza Castello

==== Via Saffi ====
Running west from Piazza Mazzini to Piazza Castello is Via Saffi, which contains one of the town's most recognizable landmarks: the Torre Civica. This brick tower, square in plan and 60 metres high, dates from the 11th century but suffered severe fire damage in April 1504 when a festival to celebrate the peace between Holy Roman Emperor Maximillian I and King Louis XII of France got out of hand. The reconstruction, completed six years later by Matteo Sammicheli, produced a taller structure which included the current bell chamber. The balconies attached to the upper part of the tower were added during the period of Gonzaga rule. Subsequent restorations were carried out in 1779 (after a lightning strike which destroyed the 15th-century clock) and again in 1920.

Adjoining the tower is the church of Santo Stefano which stands on the east side of a small square named after it. The church's origins date to the beginning of the second millennium, but it was largely rebuilt in the mid-17th century under a project attributed to Sebastiano Guala; work on the current façade began in 1787 but was not completed until the late 19th century. Inside are paintings by Giovanni Francesco Caroto (1480–1555), Il Moncalvo (1568–1625), Giorgio Alberini (1575/6 – 1625/6), and Francesco Cairo (1607–1665). Adorning both the walls and the vault are 15 tondi depicting prophets, apostles and the Virgin painted by Pietro Francesco Guala in 1757, the last year of his life.

The south side of Piazza Santo Stefano, facing back towards Via Saffi, is formed by the neo-classical Palazzo Ricci di Cereseto. The imposing façade, marked by four massive brick columns, was built in 1806 to an earlier design by the local architect Francesco Ottavio Magnocavalli.

Also in the square, there is a marble statue of the archaeologist and architect Luigi Canina by Benedetto Cacciatore.

=== Piazza Castello ===
Piazza Castello is a large irregularly shaped open space used as a car park and as a market square; it is dominated by the castle of the Paleologi which occupies most of its western side. The square arose in 1858 through the demolition of the castle's eastern ravelin and was extended in the late nineteenth/early 20th century when the remaining ravelins were removed.

==== Castle ====
The castle itself is an imposing 15th-century military construction, with a hexagonal plan, four round towers and an encircling moat.

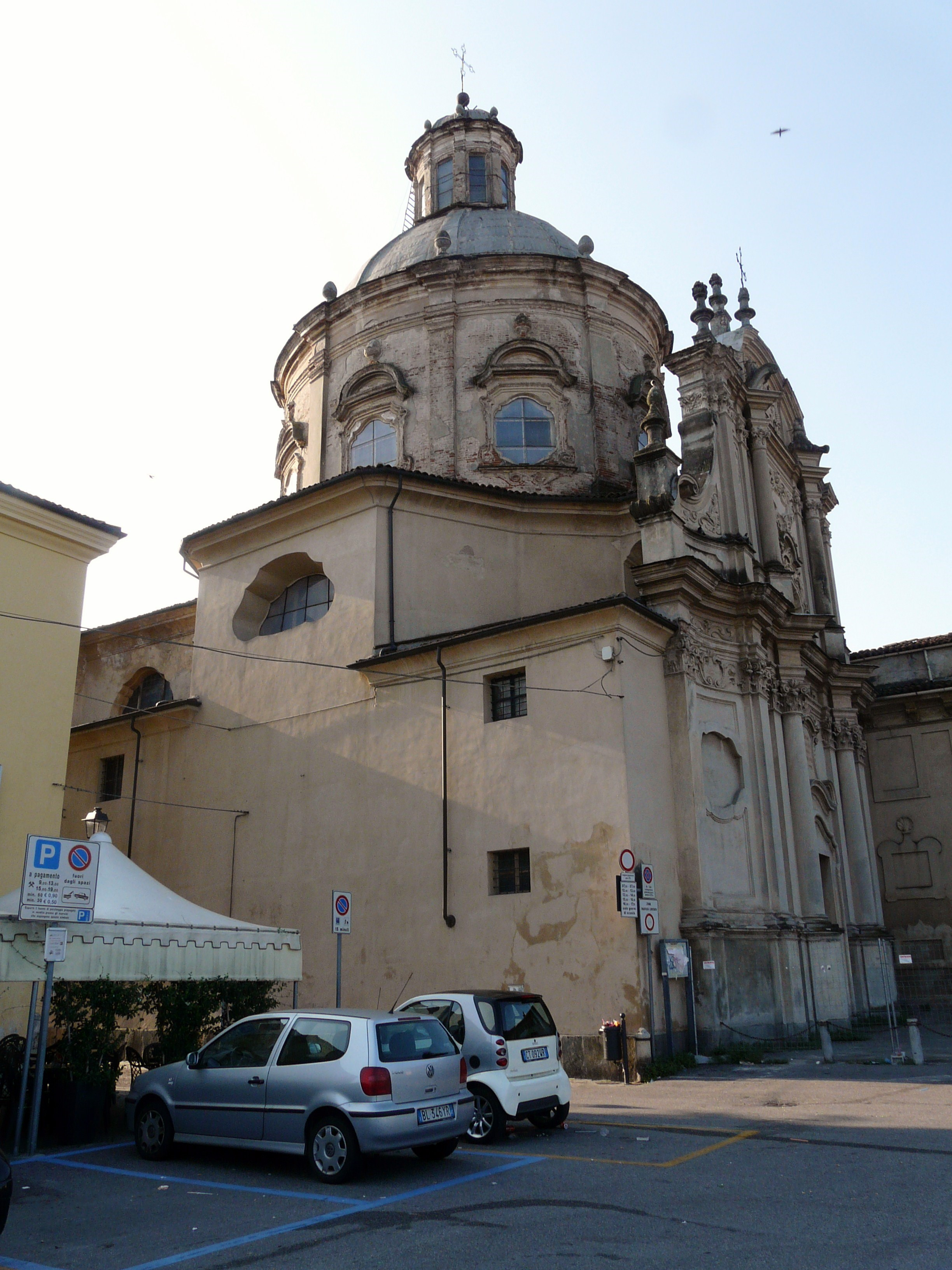
Santa Caterina. Note the elliptical drum

==== Santa Caterina ====
At the southeast corner of the piazza is the elegant Baroque church of Santa Maria delle Grazie, better known by its earlier designation of Santa Caterina. A masterwork of Giovanni Battista Scapitta, completed after his death by Giacomo Zanetti, it is marked by an elliptical cupola, and a façade curvilinear both in plan and elevation.

==== Teatro Municipale ====
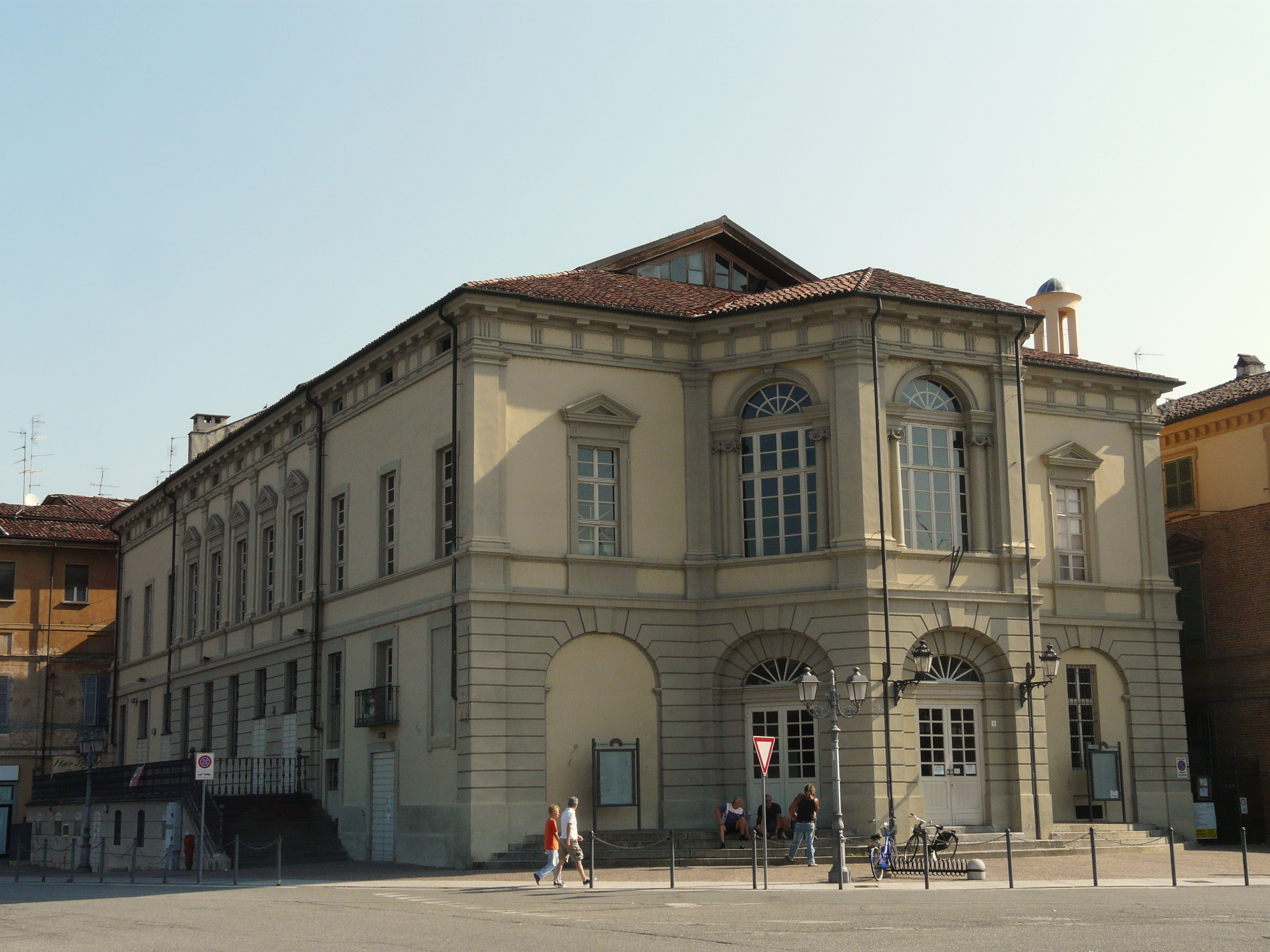
The Theatre

The theatre, which stands at the north-eastern corner of the piazza at the end of Via Saffi, opened in 1791 with a performance of the La moglie capricciosa, an opera buffa by Vincenzo Fabrizi. Its construction, to a design by Abbot Agostino Vitoli of Spoleto, had taken six years. However, it fell into disuse during the period of Napoleonic rule and remained closed for several decades. After extensive internal embellishment, the theatre reopened in 1840 with a performance of Vincenzo Bellini's Beatrice di Tenda. In 1861 the theatre was sold by the Società dei Nobili to the local authority (the comune) which made it more accessible to the general public. Nevertheless, it fell again into decline; during World War II it was used as a store. Major restoration work took place in the 1980s and the theatre finally reopened in 1990 with a performance by Vittorio Gassman. Since then it has offered a mixture of theatre, music and dance, while the foyer is used for exhibitions, usually photographic.

The horseshoe-shaped auditorium with stalls, four tiers of boxes and a gallery (or loggione, i.e. the gods) is richly decorated with frescoes, stucco, gilding and velvet. The curtains of the royal box hang from a structure supported on stucco caryatids by Abbondio Sangiorgio who also designed the equestrian statue in Piazza Mazzini.

The stage curtain, showing Apollo in His Sun Chariot, was designed by the scenographer Bernardino Galliari (1707–1794). A sketch for the curtain is preserved at the Galleria Sabauda in Turin.

==== Via Garibaldi and Sant’Ilario ====
From the side of the theatre, Via Garibaldi leads northwards to the 16th-century church of Sant'Ilario, founded in 380 in honour of Hilary of Poitiers. It was completely rebuilt in 1566 and was largely restructured towards the end of the 19th century. The church's polychrome façade is of interest and it contains two important works by Niccolò Musso: the Madonna del Carmine (‘Our Lady of Mount Carmel’) and San Francesco ai piedi del Crocefisso (‘Saint Francis at the foot of the Crucifix’) originally from the church of San Francesco.

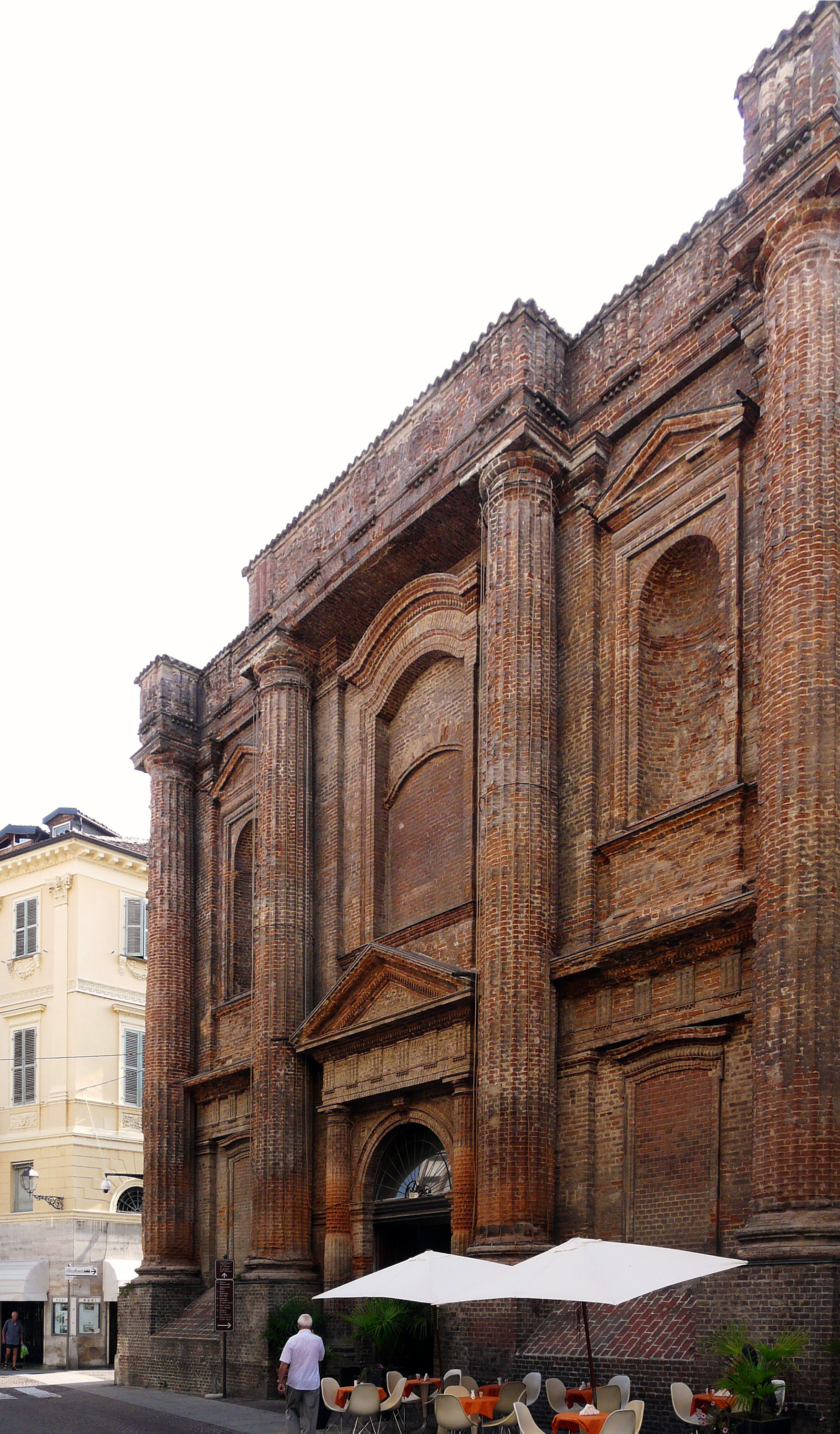
Neoclassical façade of Santa Croce by Francesco Ottavio Magnocavalli

=== Via Roma, ghetto and synagogue ===
Behind the shops on the west side of Via Roma, which runs southwards from Piazza Mazzini, lay the ghetto which persisted until the emancipation of the Jews in Piedmont following Charles Albert's concession of a constitution, the Statuto Albertino, under the revolutionary pressures of 1848. The Synagogue of Casale Monferrato is inside a building at Vicolo Olper 44 that offers no hint from its nondescript exterior that it is a synagogue, built in 1595, and recognized as one of the most beautiful in Europe. The women's galleries now host an important Jewish museum. Of particular interest are the Tablets of the Law in gilded wood, dating from the 18th century, numerous rimonim (Torah finials) and atarot (crowns for the Torah scrolls) carved and with silver filigree.

=== Giardini pubblici and public sculpture ===
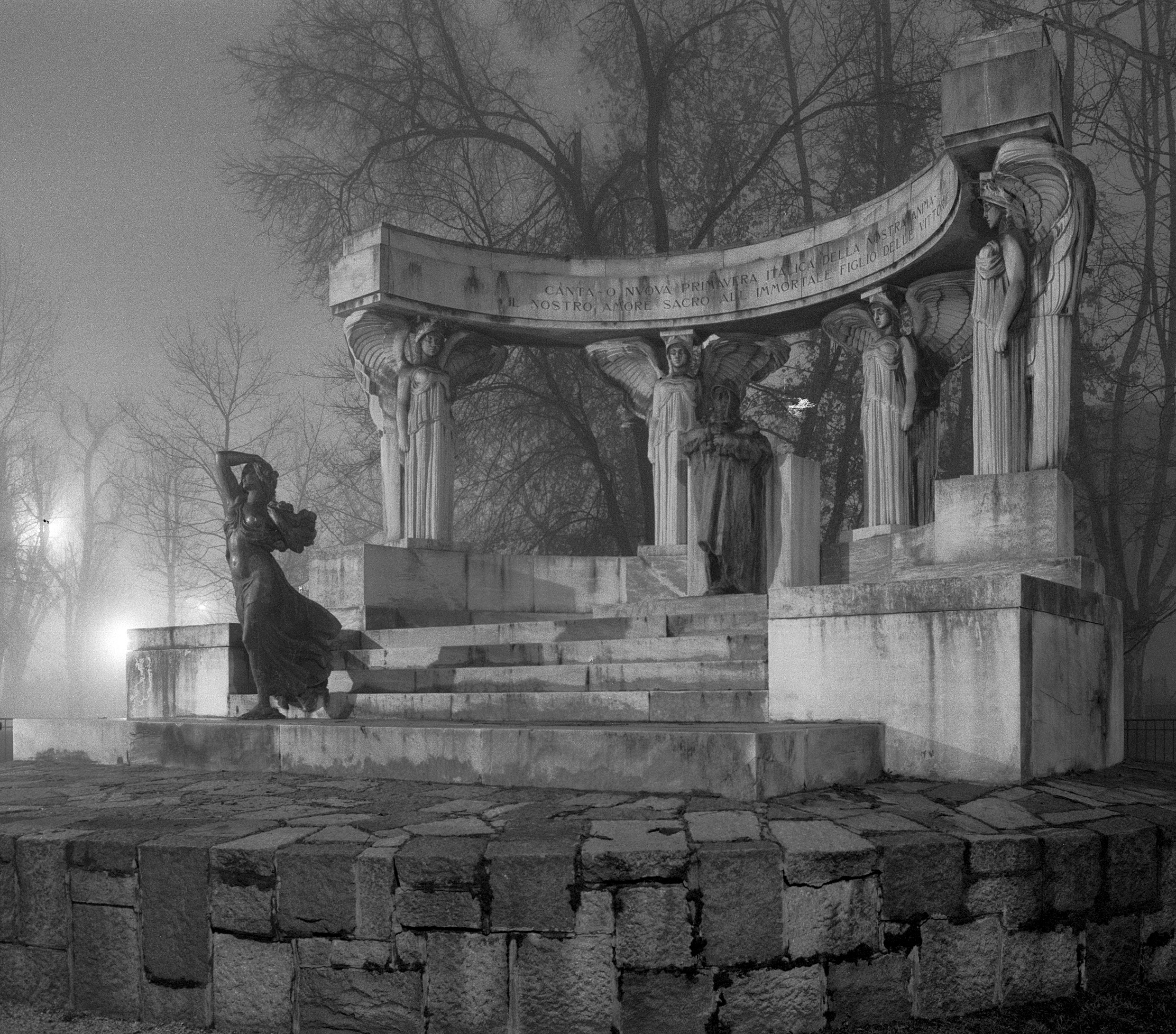
Ai caduti: the war memorial

The public gardens which front the railway station extend westwards, dissected by various streets, almost to the southern end of Via Roma. They contain a range of monuments to figures of local and national renown including Giovanni Lanza (sculpted by Odoardo Tabacchi, 1887), Giuseppe Antonio Ottavi (Leonardo Bistolfi, 1890), Filippo Mellana (Giacomo Ginotti, 1887), and Giuseppe Garibaldi (Primo Giudici, 1884).

The most important, however, is Bistolfi's war memorial of 1928 (pictured left). A marble exedra with four caryatids in the form of winged victories is raised on a dias fronted with steps. The bronze sculpture Il Fante Crociato, a foot soldier in crusader-period costume, takes centre stage; a second bronze a lightly robed Primavera Italica (Italic Spring) steps down from the platform and out of the ensemble.

Other public sculptures of note in Casale include the monument to King Charles Albert in Piazza Mazzini mentioned above, Bistolfi's 1887 monument to Urbano Rattazzi in Piazza Rattazzi, Benedetto Cacciatori's Luigi Canina in Piazza Santo Stefano. The Monumento alla difesa di Casale (Francesco Porzio 1897; pictured right), situated to the north of the castle, commemorates the vigorous action which took place during the First Italian War of Independence in 1849 to defend the city against Austrian troops who had just taken part in the defeat of the Piedmontese army. In the Priocco district, to the south of the historic centre, in Viale Ottavio Marchino, there is a monument by Virgilio Audagna to the cement industrialist Ottavio Marchino, son of the founder of Cementi Marchino, which is now part of Buzzi Unicem.

=== Palazzi ===
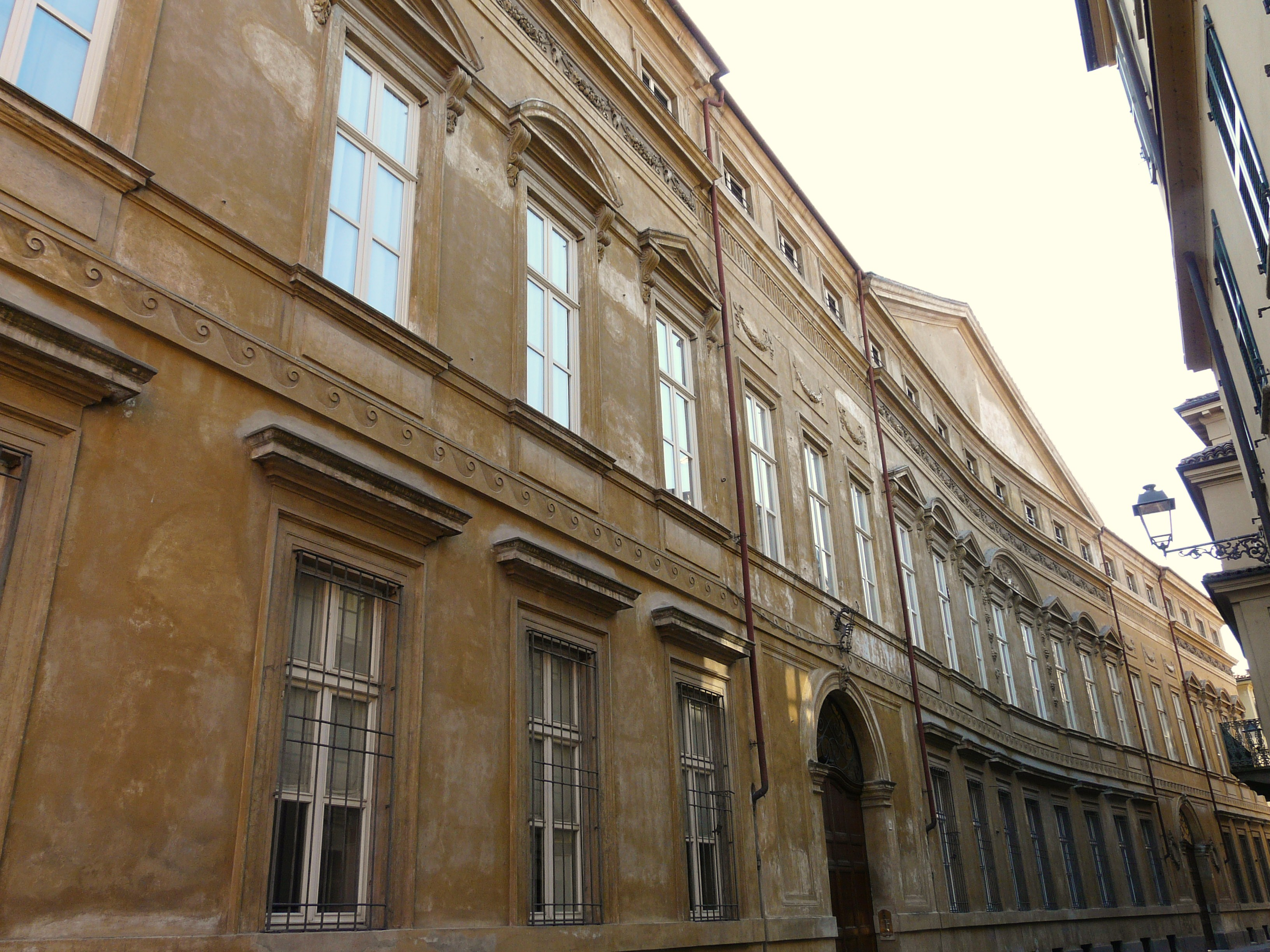
Palazzo Treville

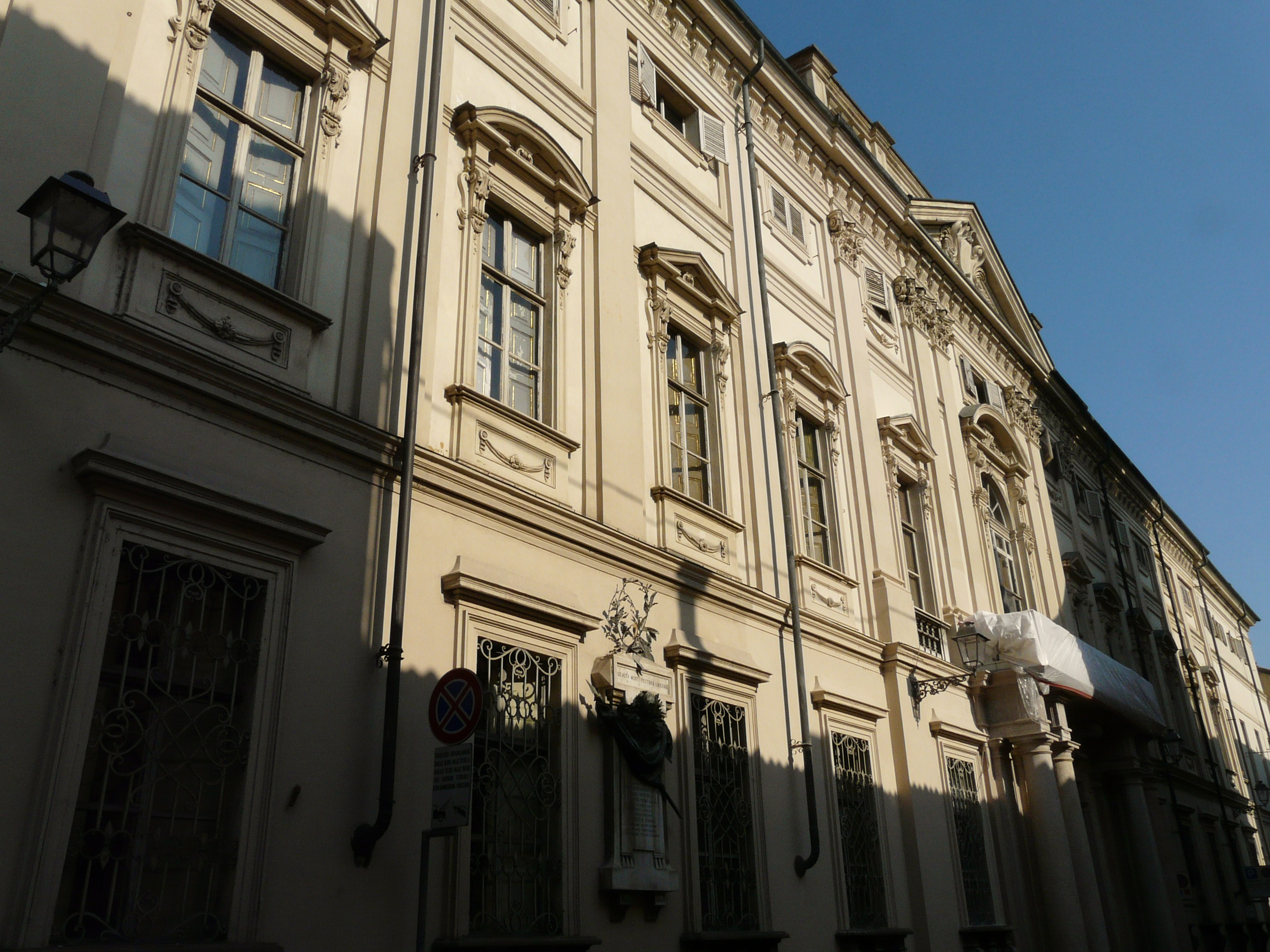
Palazzo San Giorgio, the town hall

The historic centre is marked by many palazzi which are often Baroque in appearance (though the substance is often earlier), reflecting the urban renewal which took place in the early decades of the 18th century. Among the best-known are:

- The 15th-century palazzo of the Marchesa Anna d'Alençon in Via Alessandria.
- The 15th-century Palazzo Treviso, in Via Trevigi, was restructured on behalf of Anne d'Alençon before being given to the Dominican convent. During the Napoleonic period, it was used as a lyceum and has subsequently remained in scholastic use.
- Palazzo Del Carretto, also known as the Casa Tornielli, in Via Canina, again dating from the 15th century, now housing a language school.
- The medieval Casa Biandrate, at the junction of Via Guazzo and Via Morini, has preserved its late Gothic character.
- Palazzo Sannazzaro, a gothic building in Via Mameli, remodelled in the baroque style by Giacomo Zanetti (1698–1735).
- Palazzo Gozani di Treville, regarded as the most beautiful in the town and as one of the two most important works of Giovanni Battista Scapitta, the other being the church of Santa Catarina, mentioned above. The rococò atrium and courtyard are particularly praised, as is the long and gently curved façade which follows the path of Via Mameli.
- Palazzo Gozani di San Giorgio, now the town hall, was partially rebuilt in the years 1775–8 to a design by Filippo Nicolis de Robilant. The façade is of three orders with its windows surrounded by decorations in stucco. Via Mameli.
- Palazzo Magnocavalli has a façade commissioned from Giacomo Zanetti by the architect Francesco Ottavio Magnocavalli. Inside, the monumental twisted staircase, supported by two columns, fits gracefully into a very restricted space. Via Mameli.
- Palazzo Fornara, built in 1840 in the neo-classical style by the Vercellese Pietro Bosso, forms the east side of Piazza Mazzini. The site was previously occupied by the church of Santa Maria di Piazza which was deconsecrated during the Napoleonic period. Since 1925 it has been a bank.
- Palazzo Langosco, in Via Corte d’Appello, encloses part of the main cloister of the former Augustinian convent complex of Santa Croce. Once the seat of the Senate of Montferrat, it now houses the public library.
- The neo-classical Palazzo Sacchi-Nemours, beside the Teatro Civico in Via Saffi, was built in 1750–2 by the local architect Francesco Ottavio Magnocavalli.
- Palazzo Ricci di Cereseto, in Piazzetta di S. Stefano, has an imposing neo-classical façade fronted by four massive brickwork columns, constructed in 1806 by G. Battista Formiglia, probably following a design by Magnocavalli.
- Palazzo Gaspardone-Ottavi, in Via Cavour, came into the possession of the Ottavi family during the 19th century and is noted for Bistolfi's plaque commemorating Ottavio Ottavi (an oenologist known also, in his home town, for writing the Inno ai krumiri, or ‘hymn to the krumiri biscuits’) and a memorial tablet to Saint Luigi Gonzaga.

=== Industrial Heritage ===
Casale presents numerous testimonies of the industrial past, linked above all to the cement industry and marl mines. Among the best-known are:

- Paraboloide

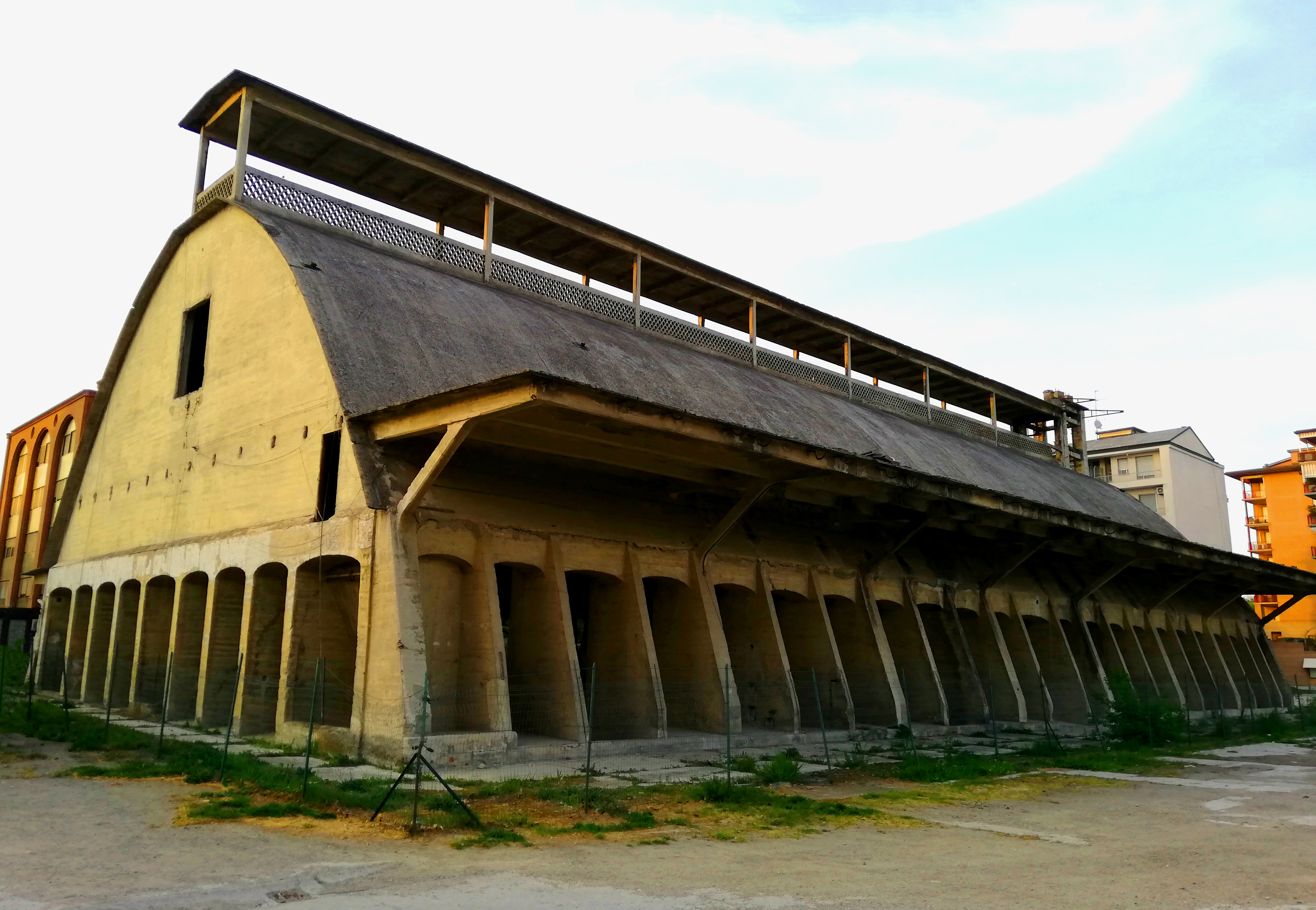
The Paraboloide

- Furnasetta

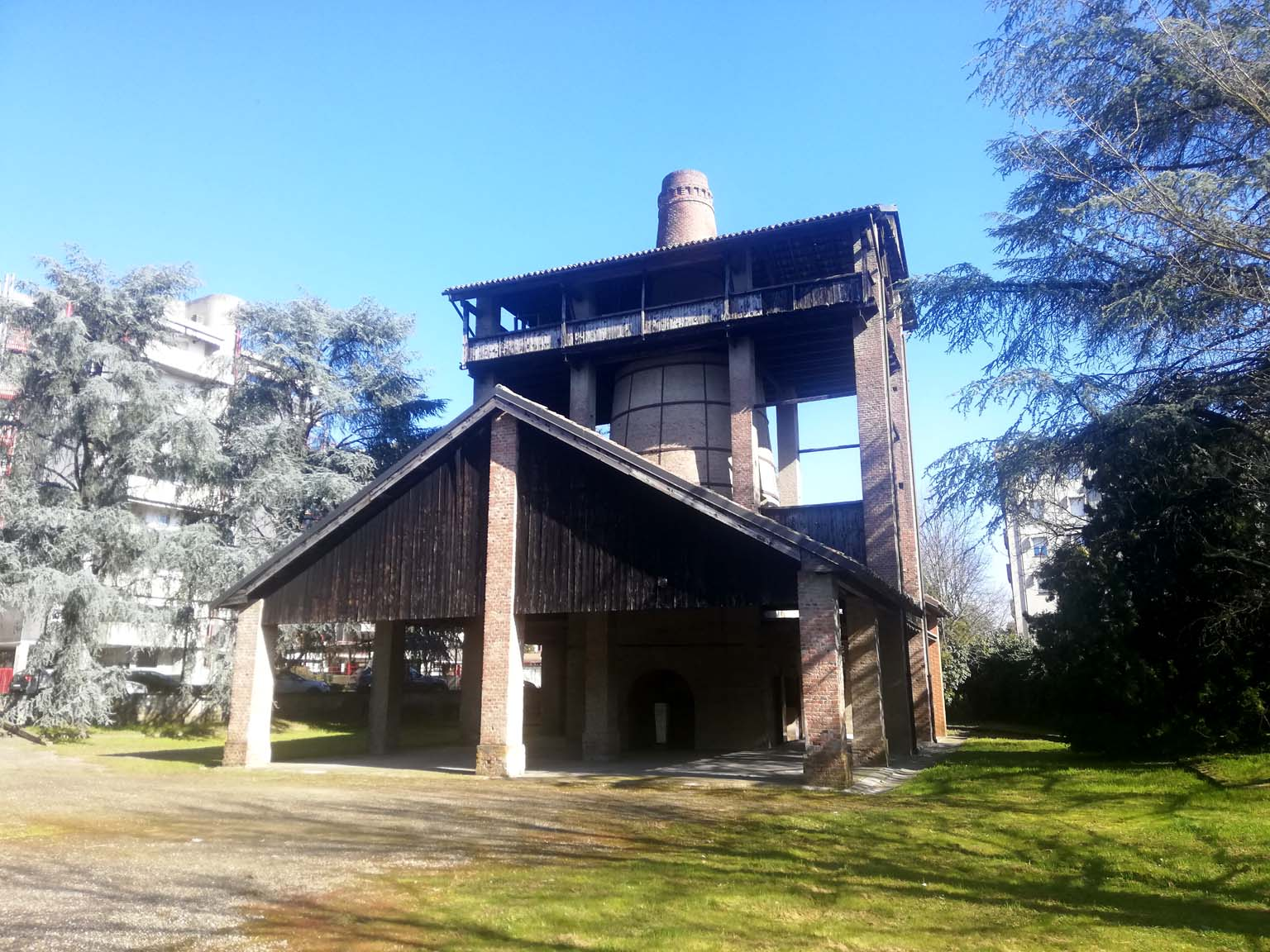
The Furnasetta

- Hydraulic lifting station of the Lanza Canal
- Former cement factory Fratelli Palli - Cementi Alta Italia

=== Museums and galleries ===
- The Civic Museum is located in the ancient convent of Santa Croce, whose cloister is decorated with frescos by il Moncalvo.
- The Dynamic Museum "Geometrie dell'Acqua" is located inside the Hydraulic lifting station of the Lanza Canal.

== Music ==
Casale was an important centre for Italian music from the 13th through the 17th centuries. During the Albigensian Crusade, Casale was a refuge for troubadours fleeing regions to the west; the music of such troubadours may have been decisive in the formation of secular Italian musical styles in the 14th century. In the 16th century, the town was incorporated into the holdings of the Gonzaga family, who were patrons of music throughout the Renaissance.

The cathedral there has in its archives polyphonic music by Jean Mouton, Andreas de Silva, and Francesco Cellavenia, as well as important prints by Giovanni Pierluigi da Palestrina and other major composers of the period. In the 17th and 18th centuries, Casale was the site for premieres of operas by Giulio Cesare Monteverdi, Pietro Guglielmi, and Pasquale Anfossi, and was the birthplace of the Swiss-Italian composer Carlo Evasio Soliva. Currently, the city's musical centre is the Teatro Municipale.

== Economy ==
=== Agriculture ===
Casale is situated in a plain where rice cultivation is predominant and in an area of cement-bearing hills and wineries. Casale is also well known for being the district of refrigeration, one of the main of Italy.

=== Manufacturing ===
Casale Monferrato was an important centre of quarries of limestone and the production of lime (since the Roman times the strength of the lime produced in the Monferrato area was well known by designers and architects). Since the XIX century Casale Monferrato became the Italian capital for binders production: Lime Putty, Hydraulic Lime and Cement. Indeed, the city had the merit of being the first Italian city to develop industrial cement production, thanks to the richness and quality of the Monferrato marl suitable, without the addition of correctives, for the manufacture of natural cement. Among the many testimonies present in the city and symbols of the history of cement production in Casale Monferrato are the Paraboloide and the Furnasetta.

Since the early 1900s Casale has been known above all for cement production; Buzzi Unicem, one of the largest cement producers in the world, is headquartered in the town.

After WW2 Casale become also an important manufacturing centre for the production of refrigerators, with the first company called Franger Frigor s.r.l. being established in the town in 1945. New companies started in 1957 Mondial Frigori s.r.l. and many more after. Only to name few Carma S.p.A., Cofi S.p.A., Framec S.p.A., all of them connected in some way with Franger Frigor. In 1965 Vendo Italy S.p.A. which sells bottle coolers and vending machines. Late '60 Cold Car started a new production in refrigerated vehicles using eutectic plates. Other companies started production in the following years: Industra Apparecchiature Refrigerate IAR, PastorFrigor, GeneralFilter, Unifrigor, IARP. "Dena" is another company working on refrigeration filters and capillary tubes. Around 13 manufacturing companies work now in this field. Most of the production in Casale is about Vending machines, Bottle Coolers, Vertical and Horizontal Cabinet, Refrigerated trucks. In this field, many are the technological innovations driven by environmental and energy efficiencies aspects which are used by those companies. Casale is also known for the training facilities in refrigeration and air conditioning organised by Centro Studi Galileo since 1975.

== Twin towns — Sister cities ==
Casale Monferrato is twinned with:

- Trnava, Slovakia, since 1967
- Weinstadt, Germany, since 2007
- Pescara, Italy, since 2009
- Gjirokastër, Albania, since 2010

== Sport ==
The town's football club, A.S. Casale Calcio, was founded in 1909. Within five years it achieved the twin peaks of its success: in 1913 it became the first Italian club to beat an English professional team (Reading F.C.), and in the 1913–14 season it won the Italian Championship. The team dropped out of Serie A in 1934, however, and since the 2006–7 season, it has been playing in Serie D/A.

During the 1970s, an annual under-21 football tournament took place in Casale Monferrato. It was named the "Caligaris" International Tournament, after Umberto Caligaris.

The local basketball team, A.S. Junior Libertas Pallacanestro Casale Monferrato, was founded in 1956 and today competes in Lega Basket Serie A, the first tier of the sport in Italy.

The PalaFerraris (officially palaEnergica Paolo Ferraris) is an indoor arena with a capacity of 3,510 people and it opened in 1996. It is the home of Monferrato Basket of the Serie B and of Junior Casale. Since 2021, it hosts the home games of Derthona Basket of the Lega Basket Serie A.

== Events ==
- Annual
  - Saint Joseph's Fair (Mostra mercato di San Giuseppe). A fair of industry, commerce, handicraft, and agriculture held since 1946. Mid-March; Cittadella.
  - Rice and Roses (Riso&Rose). A festival of concerts, pageants, markets and other events held in and around Casale since 2001. May.
  - Folkermesse (from Folk + Kermesse). The world folk music and dance festival, first staged in Casale in 1983, includes the town on its summer itinerary. July–September.
  - Magiche Figure. Exhibition of puppet theatre from Italy and abroad. September.
  - Festival of Wine and the Monferrato. A celebration of local wine and food together with related events. Mid-September.
- Monthly
  - Antiques market. Founded in 1973, this popular market is held on the second weekend of the month (except August) in the Mercato Pavia.
  - The Artemista craft market and Il Paniere market of organic produce market are held on the third Saturday of each month in Piazza Mazzini.
  - Casale Open City (Casale Città Aperta, a play on the title of the classic neorealist film Roma, città aperta). Many of the town's monuments are open, with free guided tours on Sunday afternoon. The second weekend of the month.
- Twice weekly
  - Market days. Tuesday and Friday; Piazza Castello.

== People ==
Notable people born in Casale, or with close connections to the town, include:

- Evasius (died 3rd, 4th, or 8th century, perhaps), martyr and patron saint of the town
- Ubertino of Casale (1259–1329), Franciscan preacher and theologian
- Yolande of Montferrat (1274–1317), became Eirene, Empress-Consort of Andronikos II Palaiologos, Byzantine emperor
- Facino Cane (1360–1412), condottiere
- William VIII, Marquess of Montferrat (1420–1483), who established Casale as its definitive capital
- Boniface III (1424–1494), Marquess of Montferrat
- Giovanni Martino Spanzotti (born circa 1455), painter
- William IX, Marquess of Montferrat (1486–1518)
- Anne d'Alençon (1492–1562), Marchioness of Montferrat
- John George, Marquess of Montferrat (1488–1533)
- Boniface IV, Marquess of Montferrat (1512–1530)
- Stefano Guazzo (1530–1593), founder of the Casale literary academy the Illustrati
- Francesco Hupazoli (1587–1702), supercentenarian Piedmontese merchant
- Niccolò Musso (c.1590 – c.1623), painter of the Baroque period
- Camilla Faà di Bruno (c.1599–1662), the ‘Bella Ardizzina’ who secretly married Ferdinando Gonzaga, Duke of Mantua
- Ferdinando del Cairo (1666–1748), a painter of the Italian Baroque school, was born in Casale
- Giacomo Zanetti (1698–1735), master-builder and architect who completed the baroque reconstruction of Santa Caterina, and built several palazzi in the town
- Pietro Francesco Guala (1698–1757), painter of the Piedmontese Baroque school
- Francesco Ottavio Magnocavalli (1707–89), architect
- Carlo Cozio, Count of Montiglio and Salabue (1715–1780), chess player
- Carlo Evasio Soliva (1791–1853), musician
- Luigi Canina (1795–1856), archaeologist and architect
- Joseph Rocchietti, the earliest known Italian-American novelist, was an immigrant from Casale
- Giovanni Lanza (1810–1882), politician
- Ascanio Sobrero (1812–1888), chemist
- Eleuterio Pagliano (1826–1903), painter
- Luigi Hugues (1836–1913), engineer, geographer and musician
- Francesco Negri (1841–1924), photographer
- Leonardo Bistolfi (1859–1933), sculptor
- Leandro Bisiach (1864–1946), a violin maker
- Ugo Cavallero (1880–1943), military commander
- Cesare Maria De Vecchi (1884–1959), politician
- Umberto Caligaris (1901–1940), footballer
- Egidio Ortona (1911–1996), diplomat
- Sergio Castelletti (born 1937), footballer
- Giovanni Piana (born 5 April 1940), philosopher
- Roberto Bolle (born 1975), ballet dancer, was born in Casale, although he grew up in Trino Vercellese
- Stefano Macaluso (born 1975), businessman and rally driver
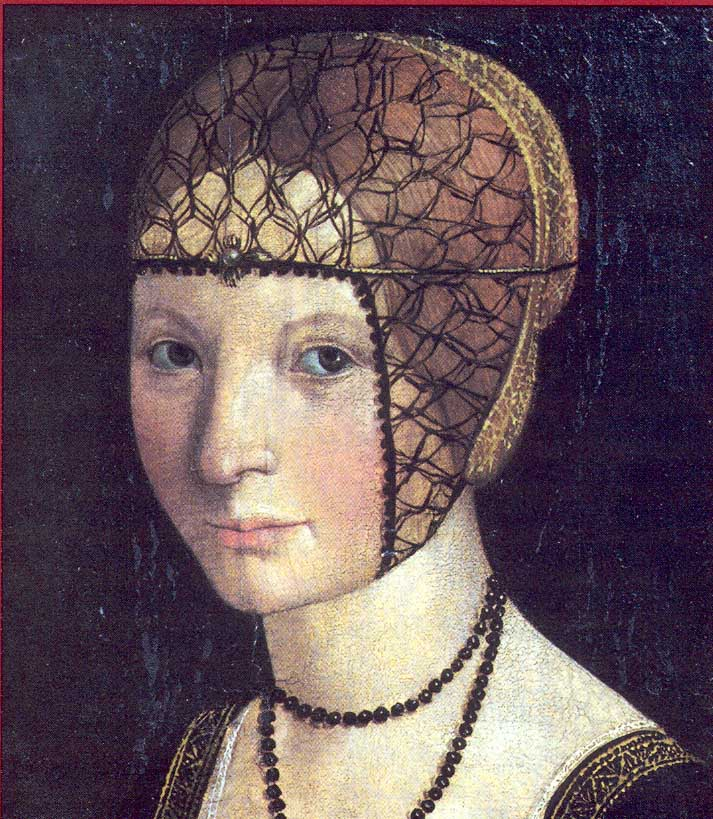
Portrait of Anna d'Alençon by Macrino d'Alba

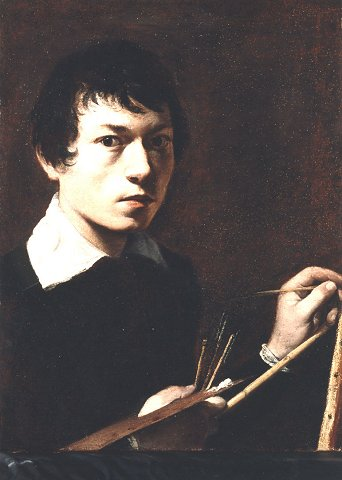
Niccolò Musso, self-portrait

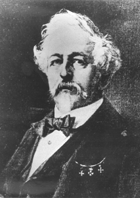
Ascanio Sobrero

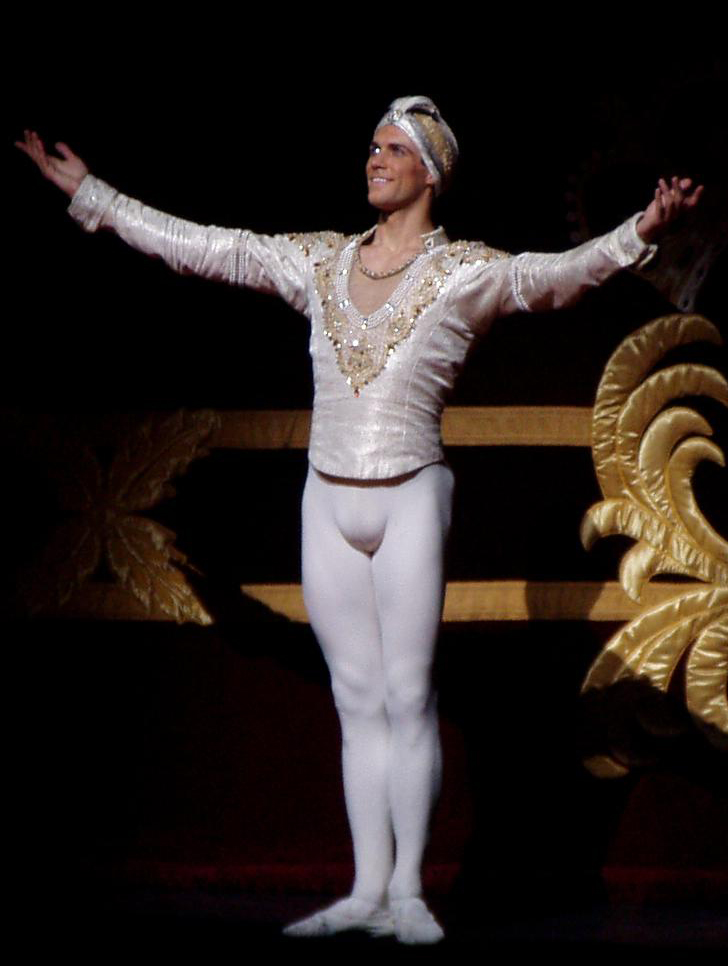
Roberto Bolle

== Fictional Casale ==
A siege of the town plays a significant off-stage role in Alessandro Manzoni's novel The Betrothed, and is the centre of Chapter 2 of the novel The Island of the Day Before by Umberto Eco, who was born in neighbouring Alessandria. Casale also appears in a best-selling historical yarn Bellarion the Fortunate by the Anglo-Italian writer Rafael Sabatini. A real 13th-century personality, Ubertino of Casale, is a character in Eco's historical novel The Name of the Rose (1980). The town features in the popular French 1960s TV serial The Flashing Blade.

== Gallery ==
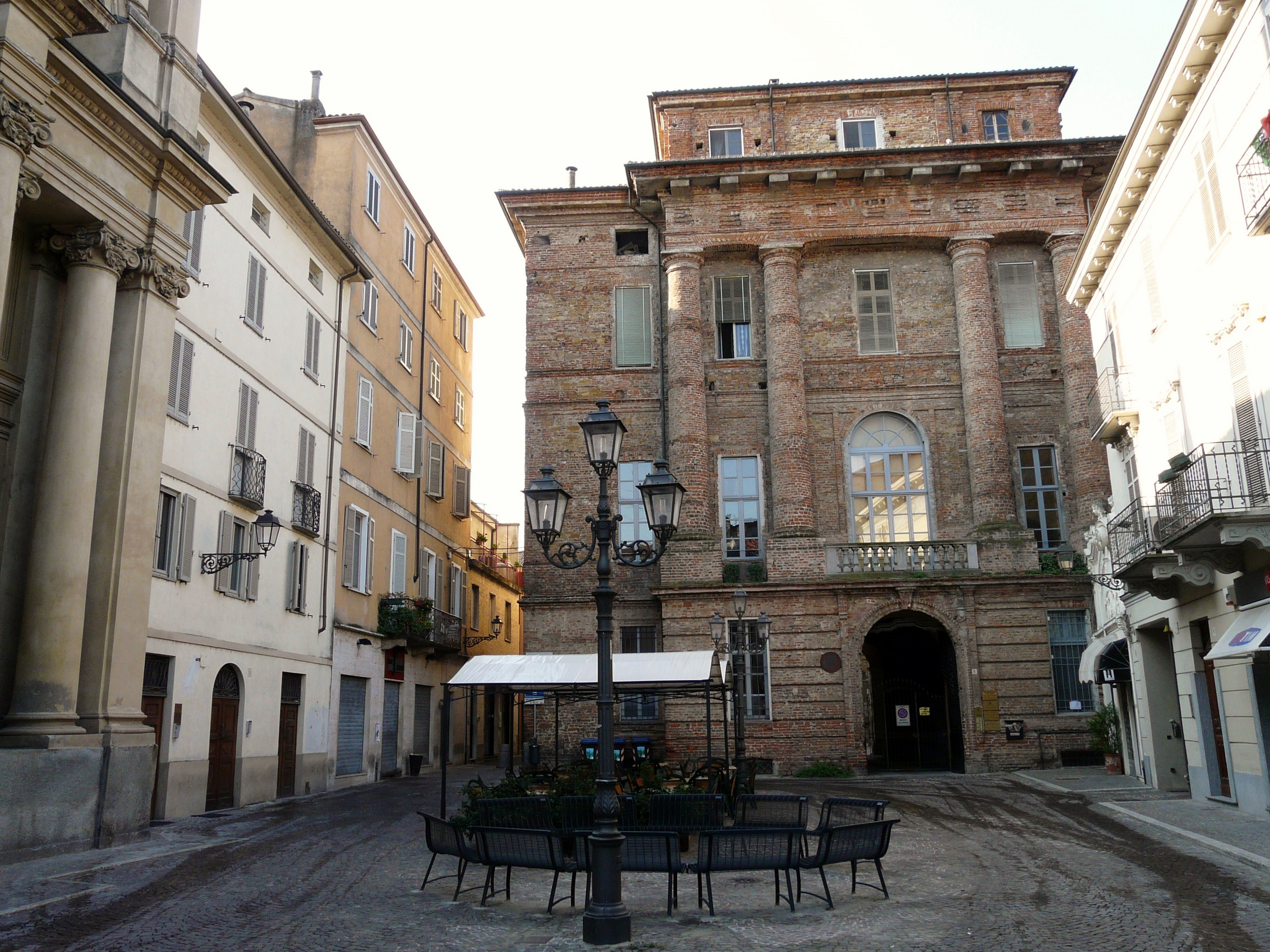
Piazza Santo Stefano

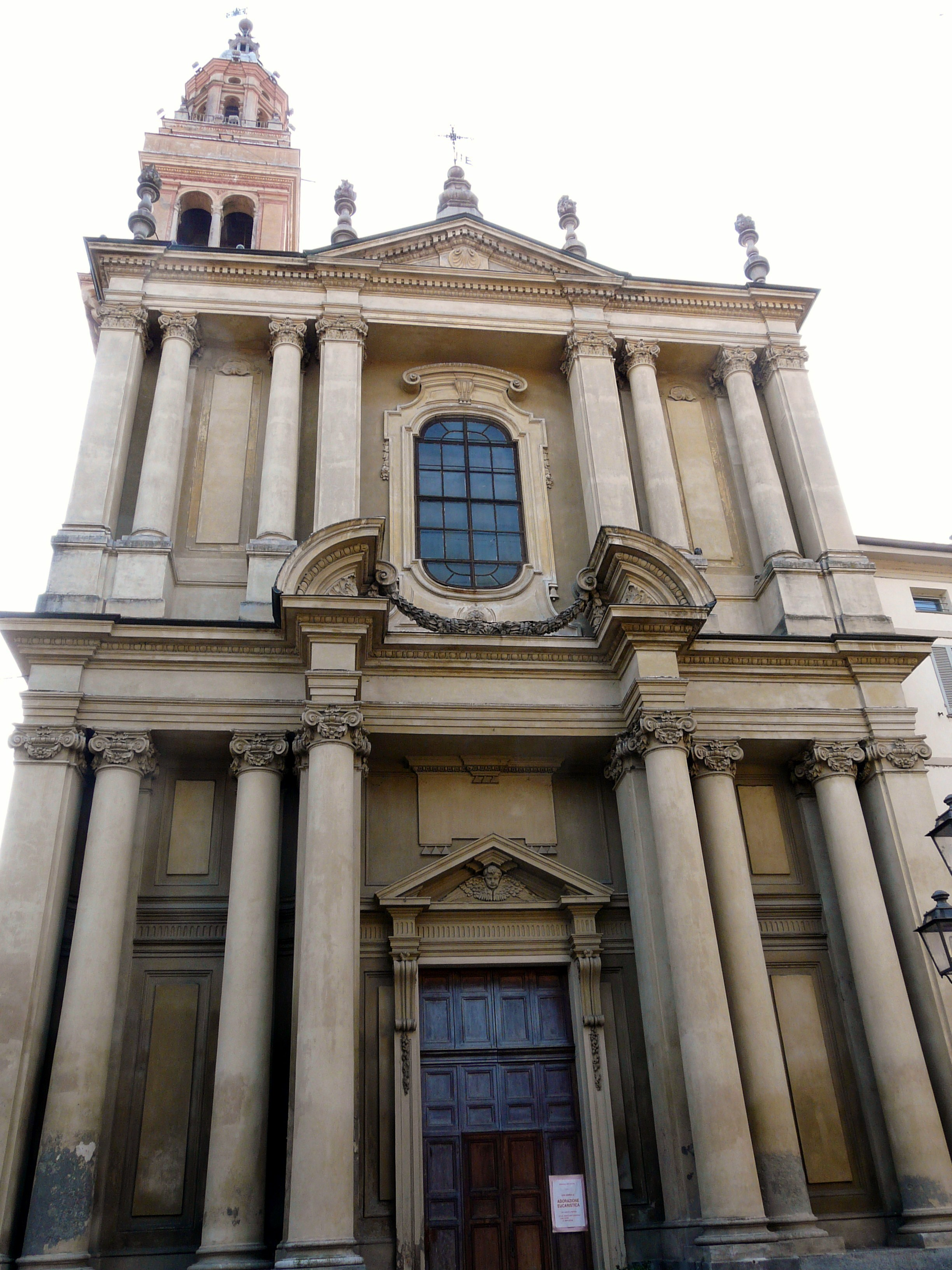
Church of Santo Stefano

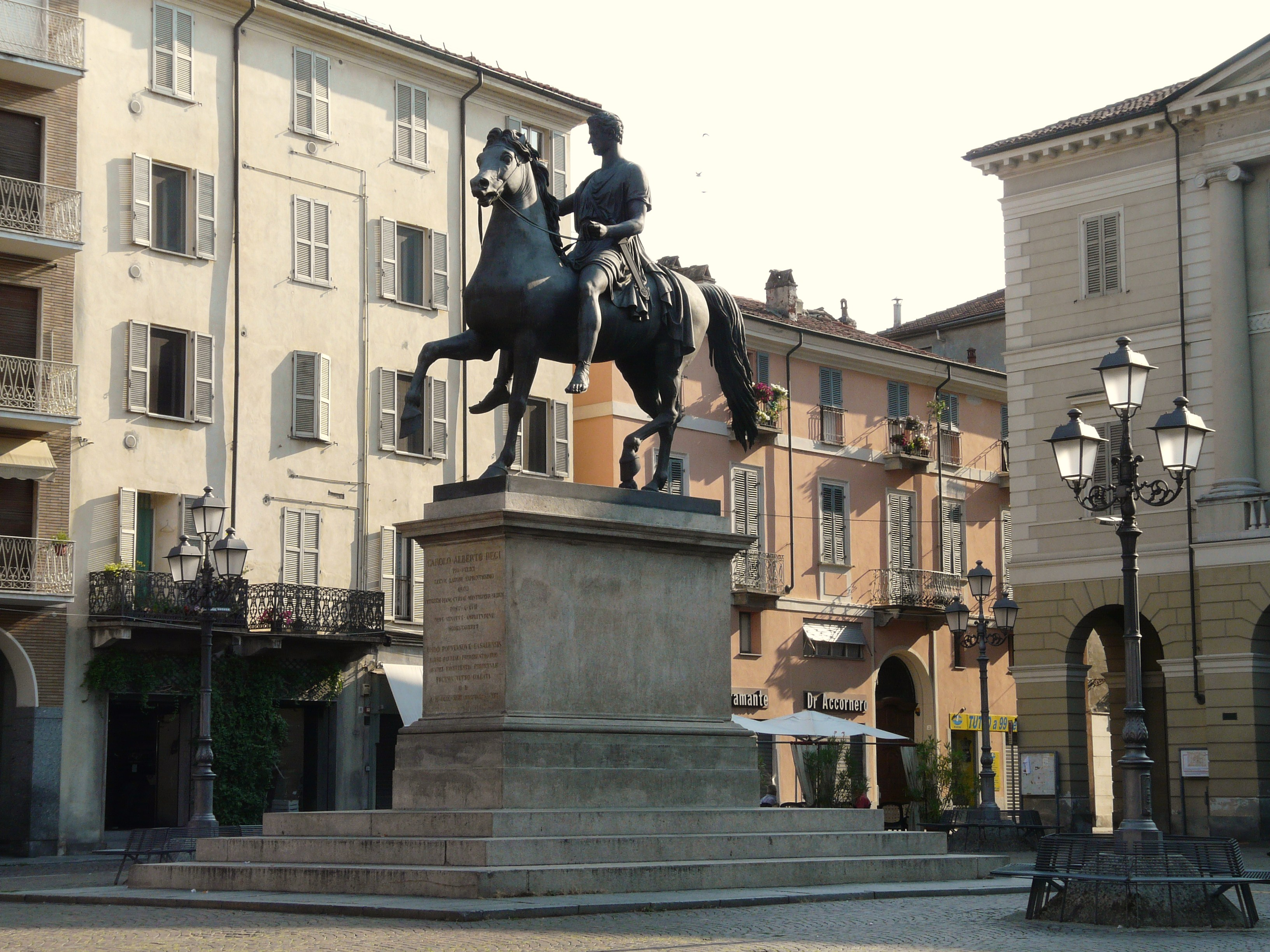
Carlo Alberto

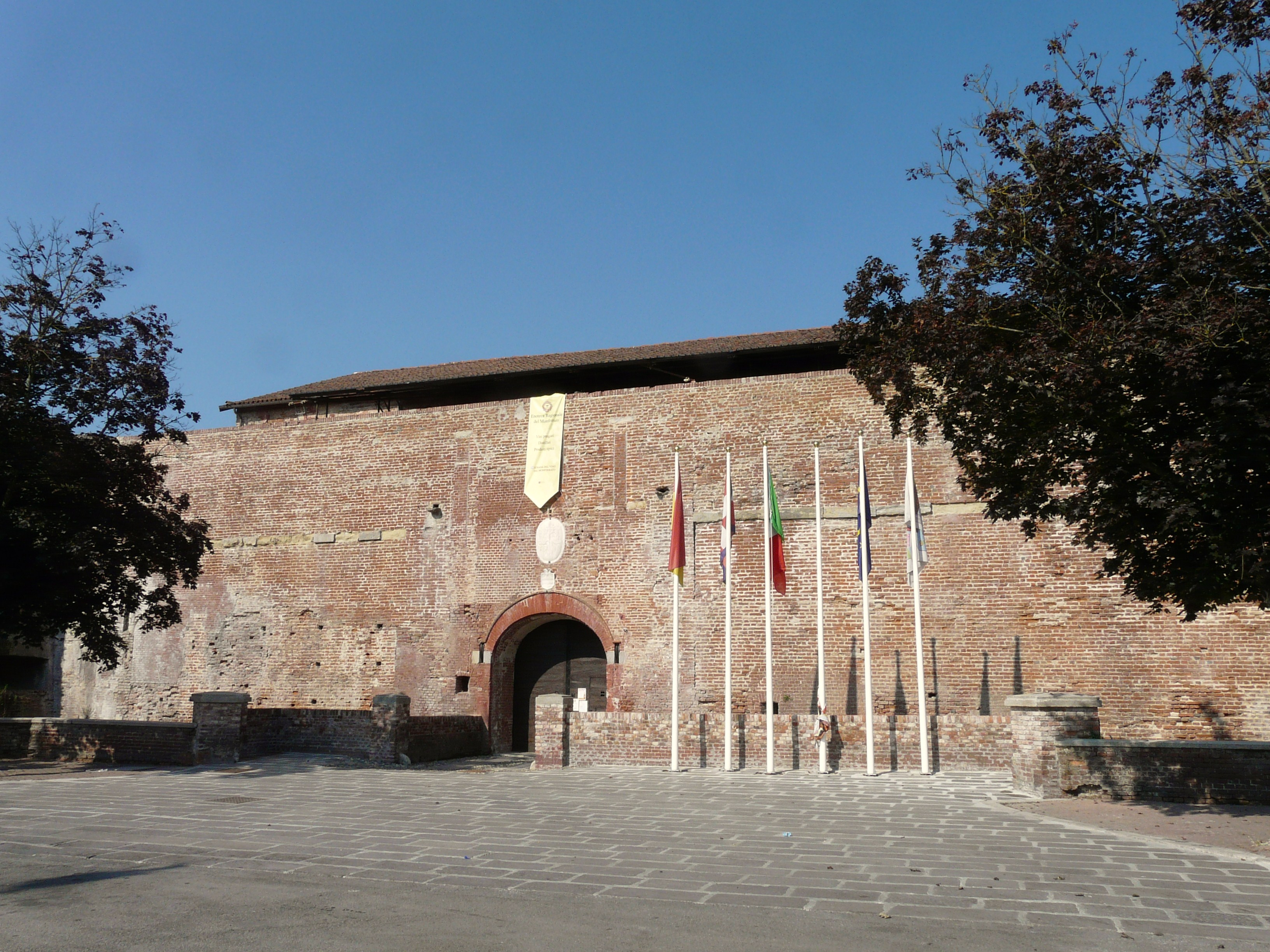
The Castle

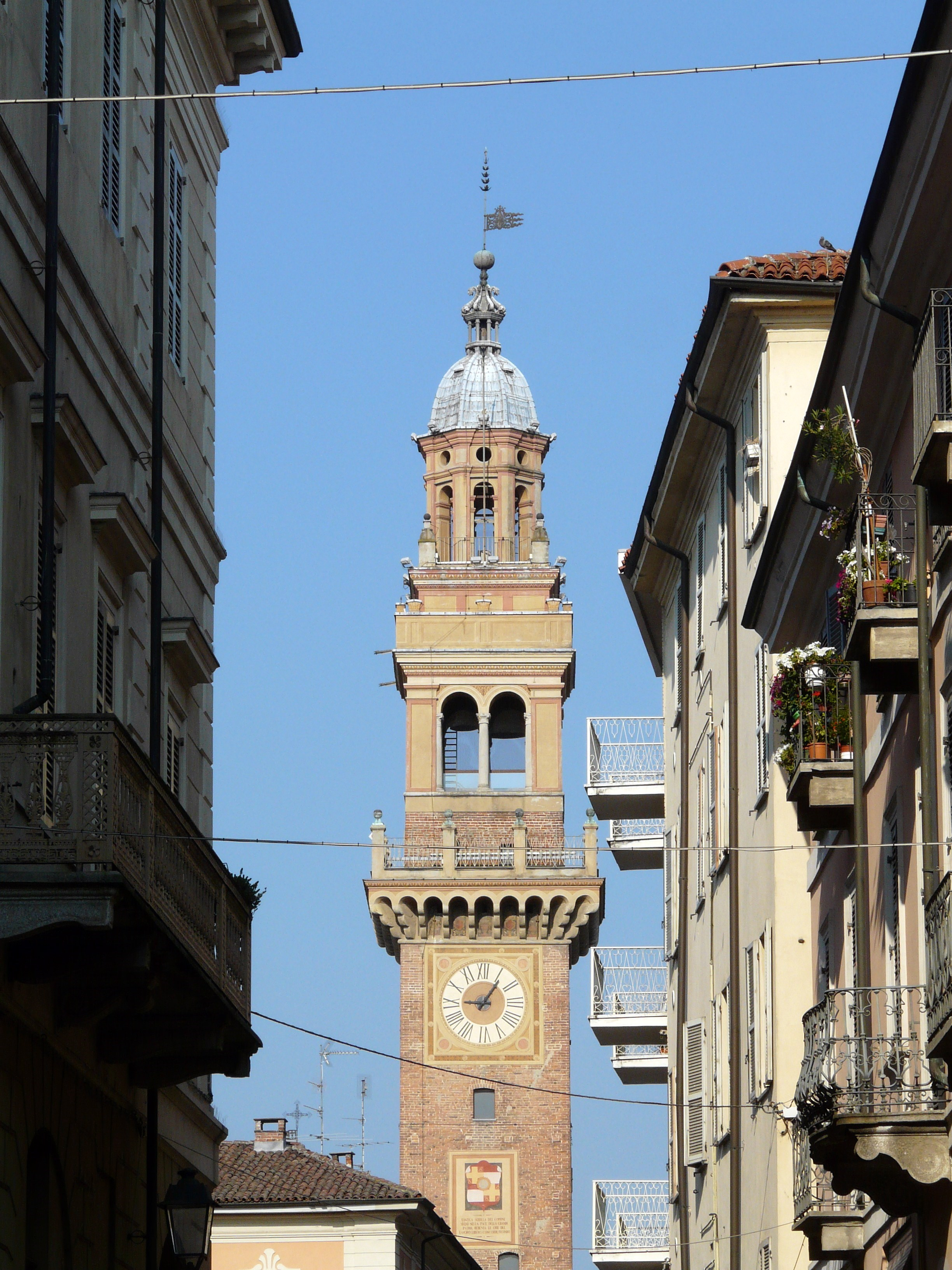
The Torre Civica

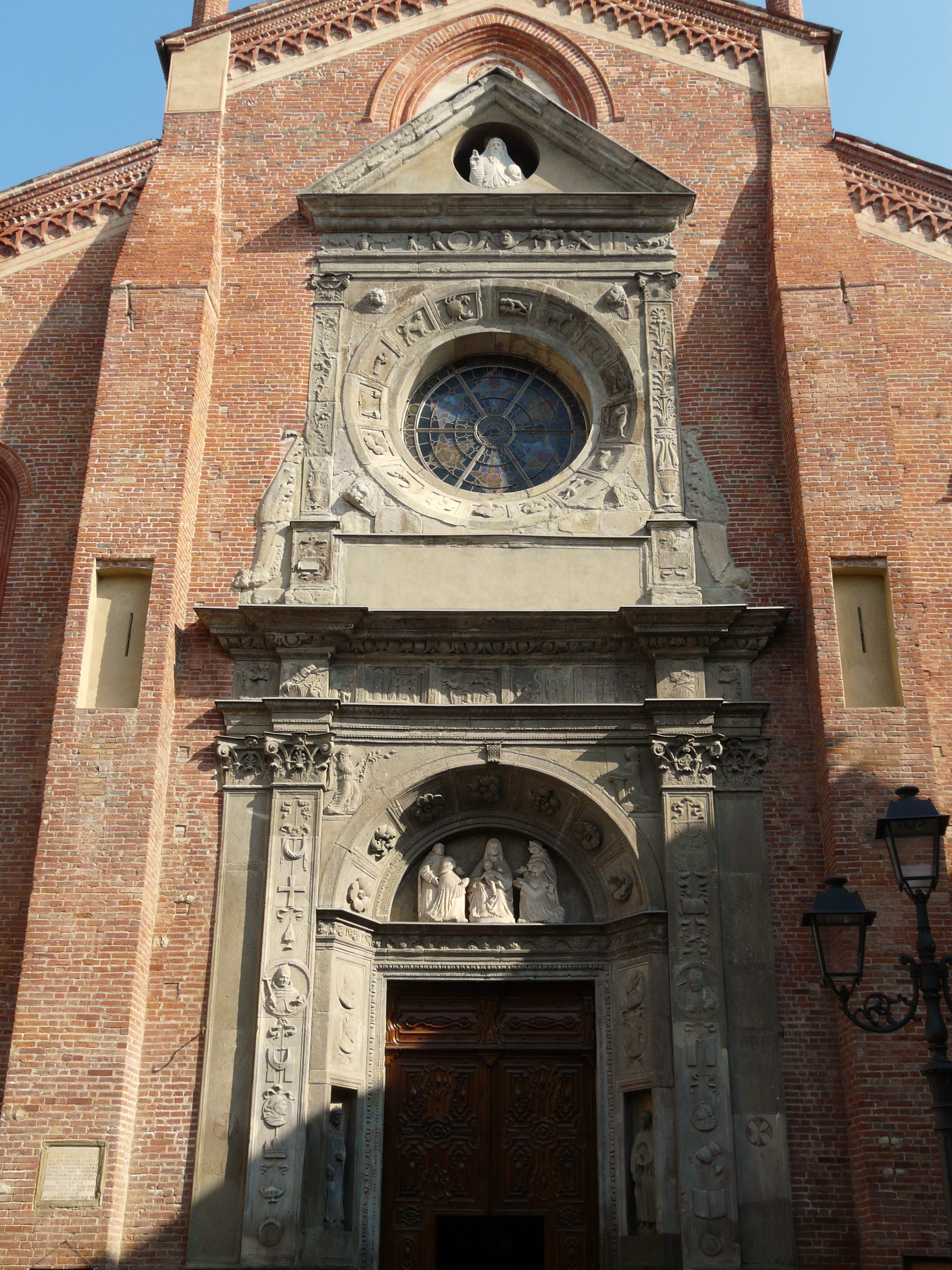
San Domenico

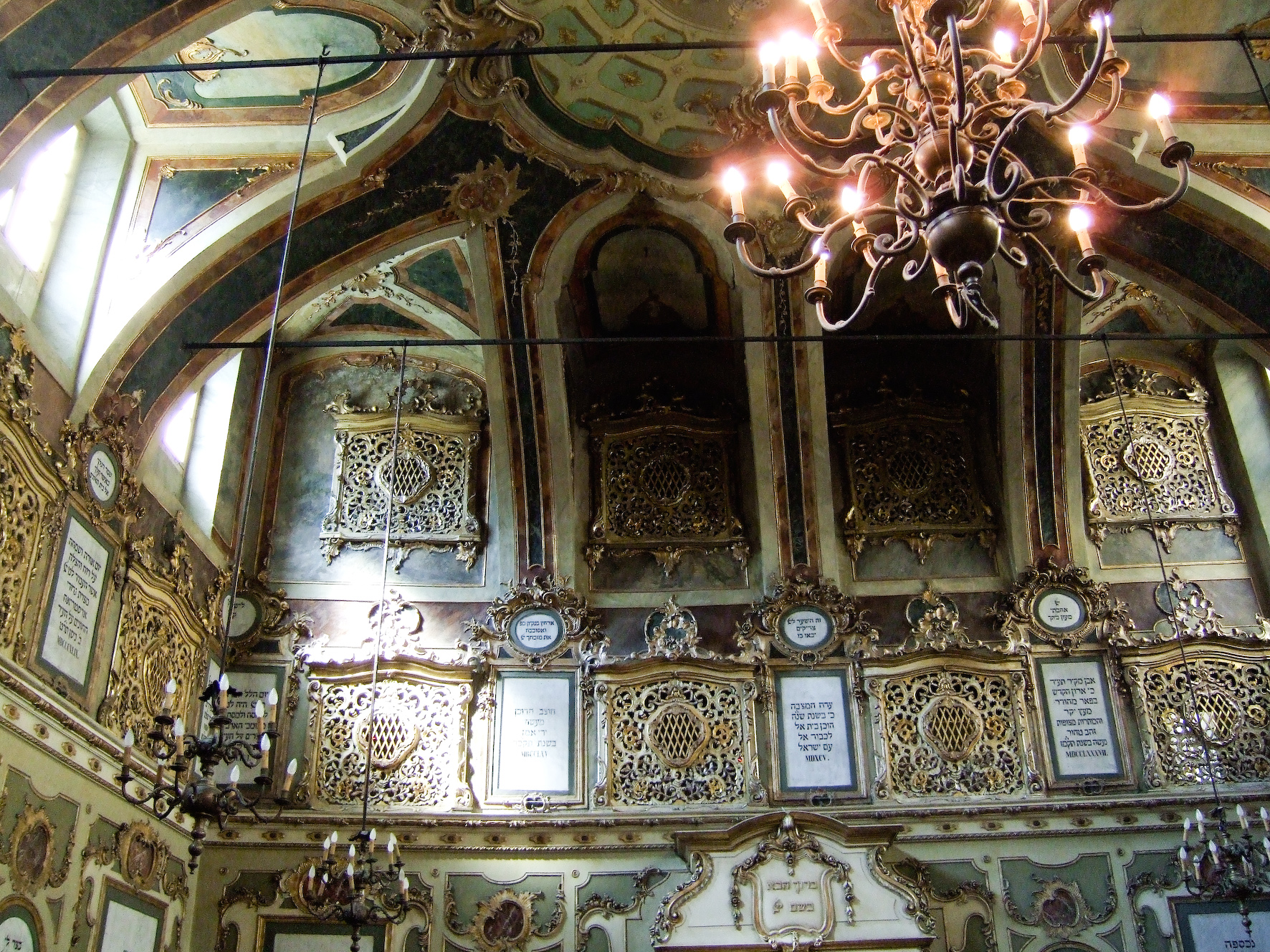
Synagogue of Casale

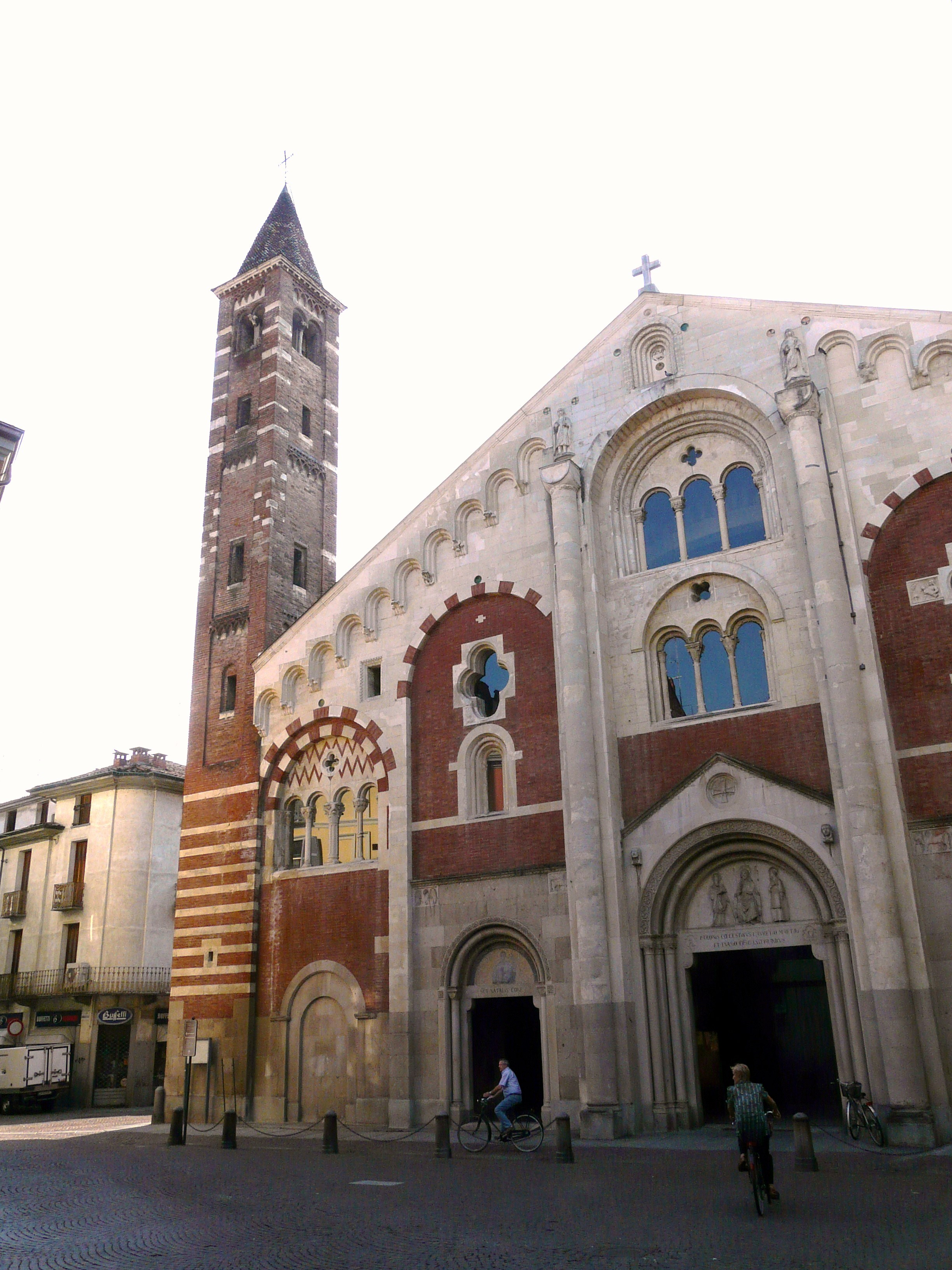
The cathedral of Sant’Evasio
