= Krumiri =

Italian kind of biscuit

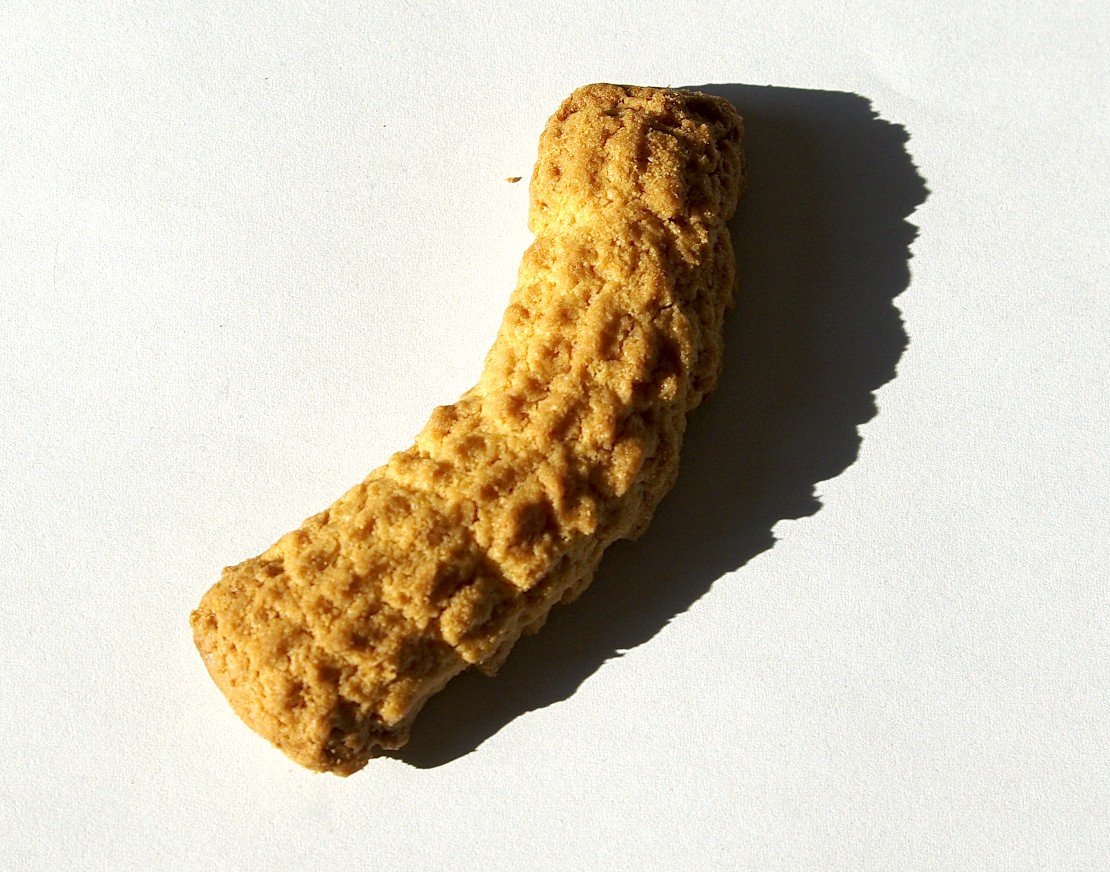
- Type: Biscuit
- Place of origin: Italy
- Region or state: Casale Monferrato
- Created by: Domenico Rossi
- Main ingredients: Wheat flour, sugar, butter, eggs, vanilla

Krumiri are a kind of biscuit which is regarded as the particular delicacy of Casale Monferrato, the city in north-west Italy where they were invented in 1878 by the confectioner Domenico Rossi. They are made without water from wheat flour, sugar, butter, eggs and vanilla, in the form of a slightly bent, rough-surfaced cylinder. This handlebar shape is said to have been chosen in honour of the extravagantly moustachioed Victor Emanuel II, the first king of united Italy.

They may be eaten with—or dunked in—tea, liqueurs, wine, zabaione, etc.

== Etymology ==
The name "krumiri" derives from the warlike Tunisian Kroumirs tribe, whose raids provided France with a pretext to invade Tunisia in 1881.

== Recognition ==
Krumiri were awarded a bronze medal at the 1884 Universal Exhibition held in Turin and the following year the manufacturers received a Royal Warrant to supply the Duke of Aosta. Warrants from the Duke of Genoa and from King Umberto I followed in 1886 and 1891. Today krumiri are among the Piedmontese specialities included in the Region’s official list of Prodotti agroalimentari tradizionali.
