= Evasius =

Christian Saint

Saint Evasius
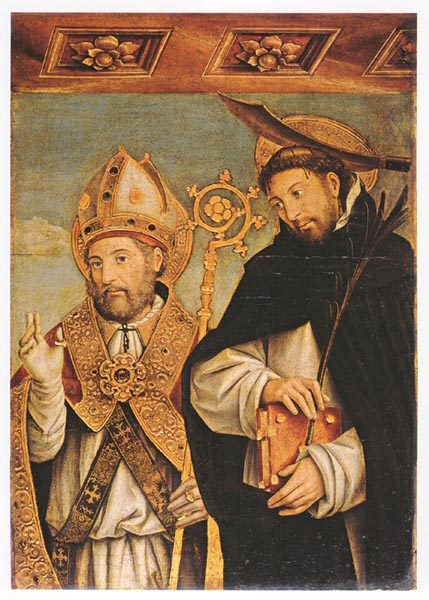
- Giovanni Martino Spanzotti, The saints Evasio (probably) and Peter Martyr. Oil on wood, c. 1595–1600. National Gallery, London.
- Born: 3rd, 4th, or 8th century AD (Note: The Catholic Encyclopedia (1907) places him in the eighth century.) in the area of Benevento, Italy
- Died: 3rd, 4th, or 8th century AD near Casale Monferrato, Italy.
- Venerated in: Roman Catholic Church; Eastern Orthodox Church
- Major shrine: Duomo of Casale Monferrato
- Feast: December 1, 12 November
- Attributes: Crozier and Mitre
- Patronage: Bizzarone (CO), Casale Monferrato (AL), Pedrengo (BG), Rocchetta Palafea (AT)

Evasius (Italian: Sant'Evasio; probably third century AD) is believed to have been a missionary and bishop of Asti, in north-west Italy. He was forced to flee to the great Padan forest known as the Selva Cornea, where he and numerous followers were beheaded by pagan, or alternatively by Arian enemies, in the area of what is now Casale Monferrato. He is venerated as a saint of the Roman Catholic Church and is the patron of a number of towns in Piedmont and Lombardy. His cult is liveliest at Casale, where his remains are conserved in the cathedral dedicated to him.

== Life ==
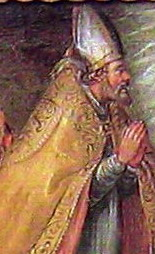
Evasius as Bishop of Asti from a 1677 ex voto in the Confraternita della Trinità

No account of Evasius's life is regarded by scholars of hagiography as reliable. According to the Historia e vita di Sant'Evasio Vescovo e Martire by the Augustinian Fulgenzio Emiglio, published in 1708, he was born in Benevento, moved to Rome in 260 and was sent as a bishop to Asti in 265. There he suffered persecution at the hands of pagan opponents of Christianity and was forced to leave the town. The earliest account of the story, the anonymous Passio Sancti Evasii, which has been variously dated to the early eleventh-century, tenth-century, and ninth-century, sets it in the times of the Lombard king Luitprand, who reigned during the years 712–744. In the versions deriving from the latter, Evasius's opponents were Lombard adherents of Arian Christianity, rather than pagans. Still, other accounts place his life during the fourth century and have him consecrated as Asti's first bishop around 330. Carbon dating of his relics (assuming that they are genuine) favours the third-century hypothesis.

It is said that following his flight from Asti, Evasius took refuge in the forest known as Selva Cornea along with two companions Proietto and Milano, and probably a third, Natale. At the site of today's Pozzo Sant’Evasio, near Casale, a miracle occurred. The bishop, tired from his journey, pushed his crozier into the ground and lay down to sleep. The pastoral staff set root and blossomed and a spring appeared at its foot.

In some accounts, he is identified as the first bishop of Casale. However, he attracted fierce opposition and was beheaded along with Proietto, Milano, and 143 companions, on the orders of the prefect (or duke or sculdascio) Atubolo. Skeletal analysis of his remains suggests that Evasius died at about the age of 60.

Erasmus continued his work of conversion in Casale (then perhaps known as Sedula, or Sedalia), founded a small church dedicated to Lawrence the Deacon and attracted numerous followers.

In the version of his life which sets it in the third century, the date of Evasius's martyrdom is given as 1 December 292, during the reign of Diocletian, whose later persecution of Christians is well known. For the version of the story which places it in the first part of the eighth century, the context is that of the struggle between those Lombards who remained attached to their Arian beliefs and the soon-to-be-victorious Trinitarian new guard, associated particularly with the Catholic Theodolinda who had been Lombard queen from 588 to 628, and to which King Luitprand belonged.

== Legacy ==
Natale is held to have escaped the massacre and to have become a priest of the church which was newly dedicated to Evasius and in which his remains were sepulchered. At the same time, the church was perhaps rebuilt on a larger scale with the support of Luitprand.

Casale, now itself named after the saint as "Casale di Sant’Evasio", grew up around the church during the Middle Ages. A new and much larger church was consecrated by Pope Paschal II in 1107.

In 1215 Ghibelline Casale was sacked by the anti-Imperial forces of Alessandria and Vercelli together with the support of Milan. Evasius's remains were removed to Alessandria along with another booty. In 1403 Casalese condottiere Facino Cane brought the relics back from Alessandria, following a military victory over that town.

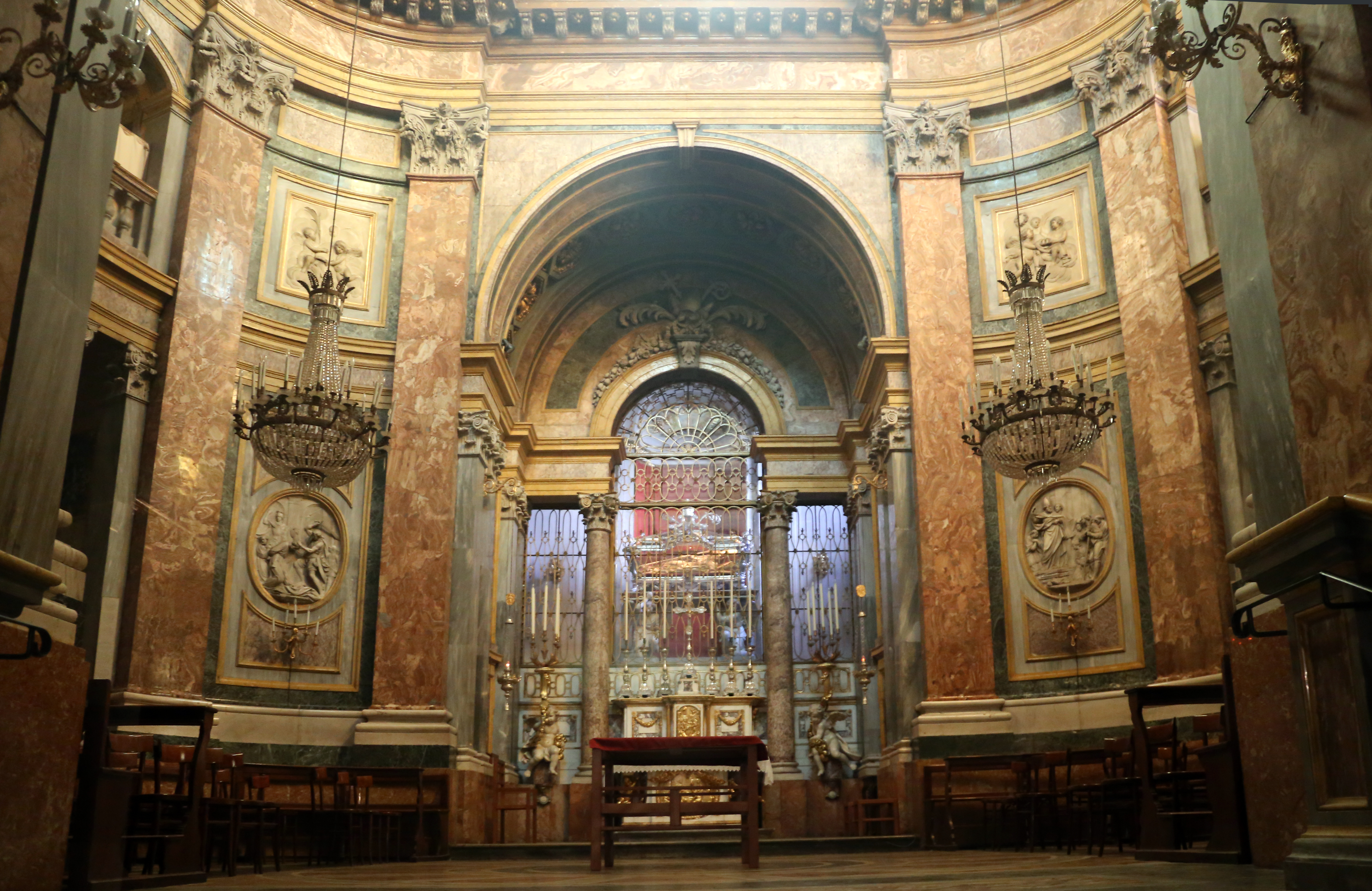
Cappella di Sant'Evasio, Casale Monferrato Duomo

The Church of Sant’Evasio became a cathedral with the establishment of the Diocese of Casale in 1474.

At Pozzo Sant’Evasio (literally "Saint Evasius’s Well") in 1670 a church was erected over the miraculous spring, which had been turned into a well whose waters were reputed to cure diseases.

== Feast days ==
Evasius's feast day was entered into the Roman Martyrology as 1 December, and it is on that day that he is celebrated in Asti. He is also the patron saint of Rocchetta Palafea in the Langhe, of Pedrengo in the Province of Bergamo (who were given some relics—part of a leg, and a bone from the foot—in 1609), and of Bizzarone in the Province of Como.

In Casale Monferrato in the Province of Alessandria, he is the patron saint both of the diocese and of the commune. Here his feast is kept on 12 November in memory of the day on which Facino Cane returned the relics to the town.

== Sources ==
- Duomo di Casale Monferrato | la storia | Sant'Evasio (in Italian)
- Pieve di S. Giovanni di Mediliano (in Italian). See the section “Evasio e Valerio: due «martiri» di età longobarda?”
- Grignolio, Idro (1983). Casale Monferrato. Casale Monferrato: Media editrice. pp. 6–7, 347.
