= Pier Francesco Guala =

Italian painter

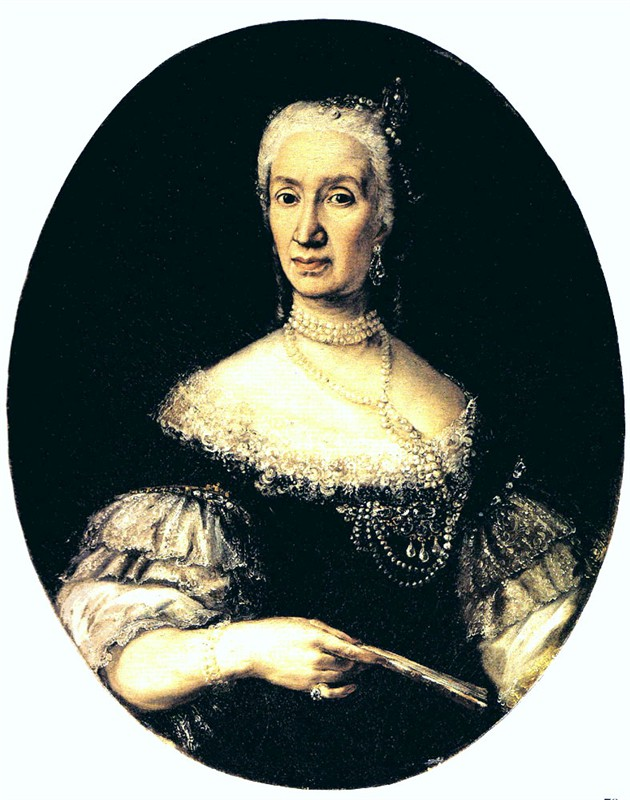
Pier Francesco Guala, Portrait of a noblewoman, oil on canvas, 88 x 70 cm.

Pier Francesco Guala (15 September 1698 – 27 February 1757), also known as Pierfrancesco and Pietro Francesco, was an eighteenth-century Italian painter active for the most part in the region of his place of birth, Casale Monferrato.

Guala was the seventh of eight siblings of whom only he and a sister survived infancy. His mother died when he was five and he was brought up by his father, Lorenzo, who himself was a painter and perhaps related to the architect Sebastiano Guala.

Pier Francesco Guala died in Milan on 27 February 1757.

== Resources ==
Media related to Pier Francesco Guala at Wikimedia Commons
