= 16th Avenue Tiled Steps =

Staircase in San Francisco, California

- Staircase
- Nickname: Moraga Steps
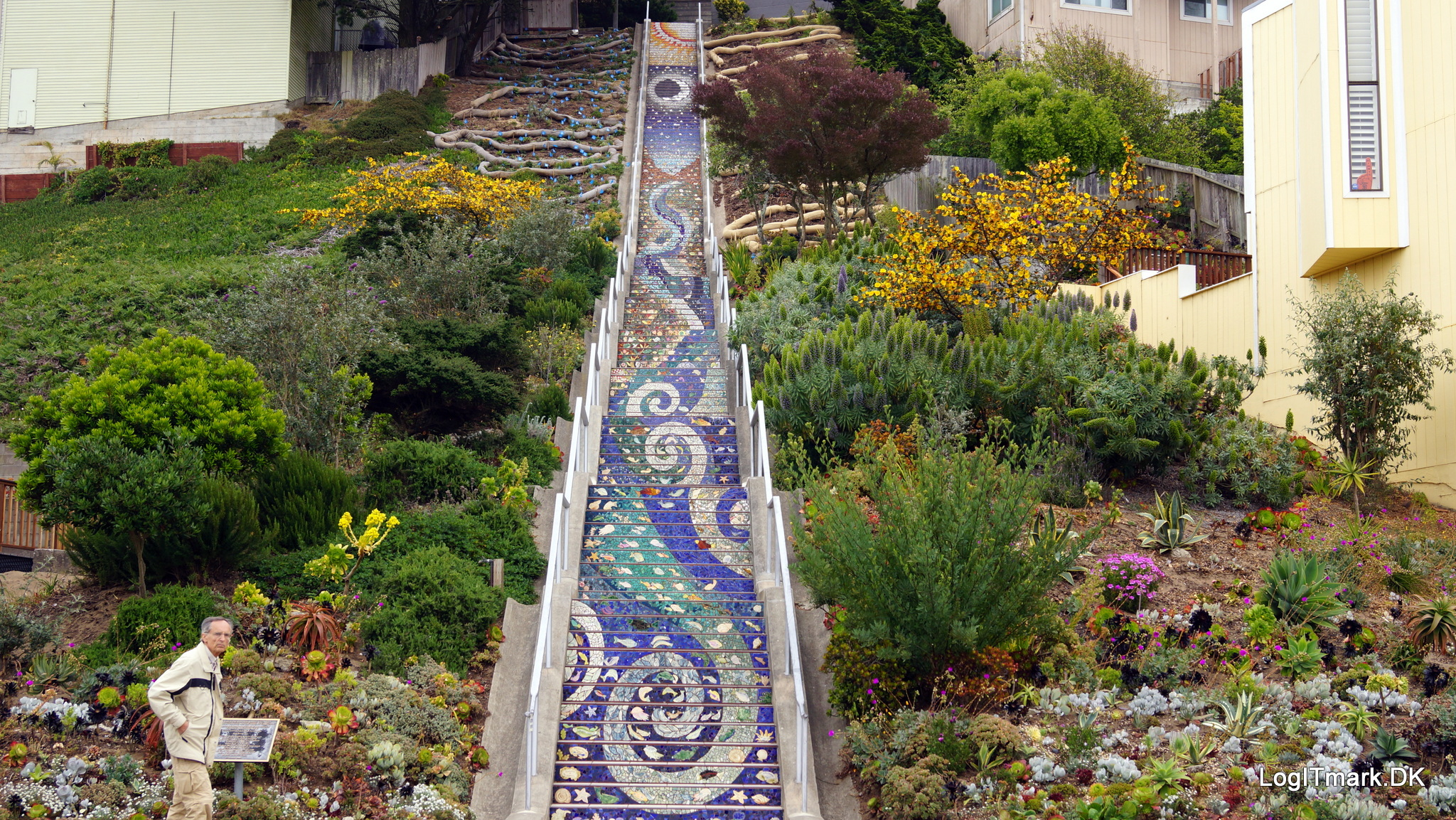
- A view of the stairs from the bottom
- Design: Aileen Barr; Colette Crutcher
- Constructed: July – August 2005
- Opened: August 27, 2005
- Steps: 163
- Surface: Mosaic
- Location: Moraga St. between 15th & 16th Ave., San Francisco, California, United States
- Location within San Francisco County Location within California Location within the United States
- Coordinates: 37°45′22.6″N 122°28′23.5″W

The 16th Avenue Tiled Steps, colloquially known as the Moraga Steps, is a stairway in the Golden Gate Heights neighborhood on the West Side of San Francisco, California. Fodor's calls it "possibly the world's largest mosaic staircase", and it leads up to Grandview Park. The flight contains 163 steps stretching 90 feet (27 m) high. These steps are also covered in over 2,000 unique tiles from over 75,000 glass fragments.

== History ==
A closer look at the stairs

Inspired by the Escadaria Selarón in Brazil, the project was first pitched by two residents of the neighborhood, Jessie Audette and Alice Yee Xavier in 2003. The duo tried to find a way to link all their neighbors together in an effort to enrich the area. Aileen Barr and Colette Crutcher, who also designed the nearby Hidden Garden Steps six years later, were chosen by residents to plan the panels of the mosaics. The project was funded by over 220 sponsored/named tiles which were also placed on the staircase. Community members all pitched in to create panels together, and three workshops were held. The Mayor's Neighborhood Beautification Fund also donated to the construction effort.

The opening ceremony was held on August 27, 2005, featuring lion dancers. Francesco Pignataro, the then-mayor of Caltagirone, Italy, also attended, as the steps' sister, Staircase of Santa Maria del Monte, was located there. Acting Mayor and member of the Board of Supervisors Sean Elsbernd declared August 27 as 16th Avenue Tiled Steps Day.

Areas nearby the steps rose in crime during 2016, as car robbers took advantage of the tourists viewing the steps to break in.

== Features ==
Both sides of the stairs contain a garden containing native California plants (which support the endangered green hairstreak) and succulents, with the south side being donated by the Xavier family, while the north side was developed in 2006, after a grant was obtained from San Francisco Beautiful. The San Francisco Succulent Society donated succulents in 2010, and Nature in the City helped with a restoration of the butterfly habitats in 2014. One Brick assists in organizing volunteering days, which occur on Earth Day weekend and fall.

The stairs themselves have a design focused on the sky and sea, with sea creatures containing names of sponsors dotted within.
