= Grand Staircase (disambiguation) =

A grand staircase is a large and often fancy set of stairs, found usually in grand buildings, palaces, mansions, parks, and cities, and serving as an architectural focal point for a large room or area. Grand staircase may also refer to:

== Particular grand staircases ==
- Grand Staircase at the White House at the Executive Mansion in Washington D.C
- Grand Staircase of the RMS Titanic on a large defunct luxury liner
- Jordan Staircase of the Winter Palace in Saint Petersburg
- Spanish Steps in Rome
- Potemkin Stairs in Odesa
- Yerevan Cascade in Yerevan
- Camondo Stairs in Istanbul
- Chkalov Stairs in Nizhny Novgorod
- Staircase of Santa Maria del Monte in Caltagirone, Sicily
- The Grand Staircase at Hogwarts, a fictional place

== Geographical features ==
- Grand Staircase, a large natural feature over 100 miles (160 km) long
  - Grand Staircase–Escalante National Monument, one of the designated areas protecting various parts of this feature
