= Villa Patti, Caltagirone =

Coordinates: 37°N 15°E

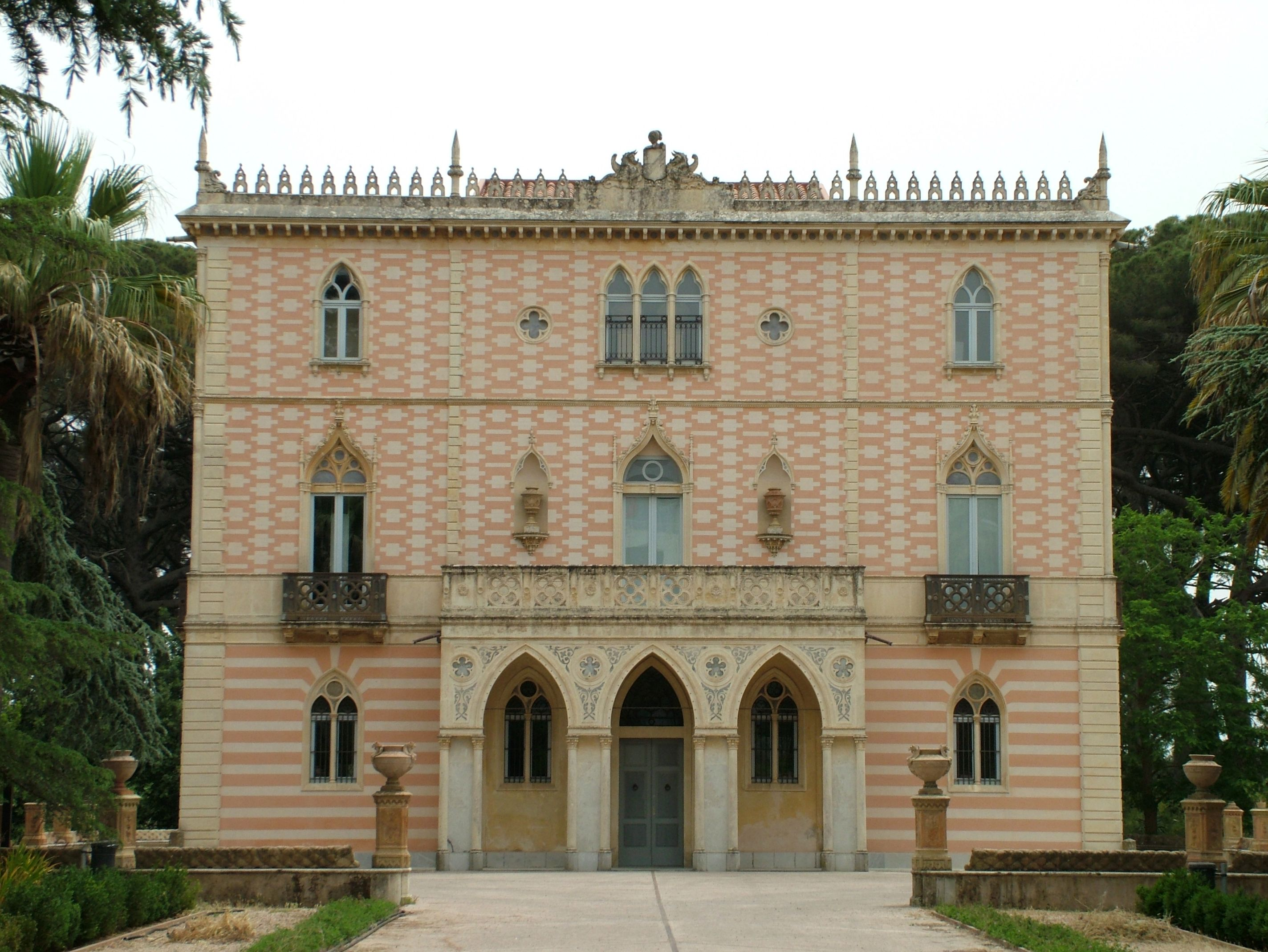
Villa facade

Villa Patti is a monumental semi-rural house on Via Santa Maria de Gesu, Caltagirone in Sicily, Italy. It now houses the Museo delle Ville Storiche Caltagironesi e Siciliane.

== History ==
A house belonging to the aristocrat Patti was present at the site by the 19th century. It was refurbished by architect Gian Battista Nicastro, who created the decorative Neo-Gothic facade. The windows and roofline merlions recall Venetian Gothic architecture. The house is surrounded by a park, once partly a farm.

== Museo delle Ville Storiche Caltagironesi e Siciliane ==
The museum houses artworks and photographs of the region's aristocratic life. It contains displays of local ceramics, including vases and maiolica tiles.
