= Grandview Park =

Park in San Francisco, California, United States

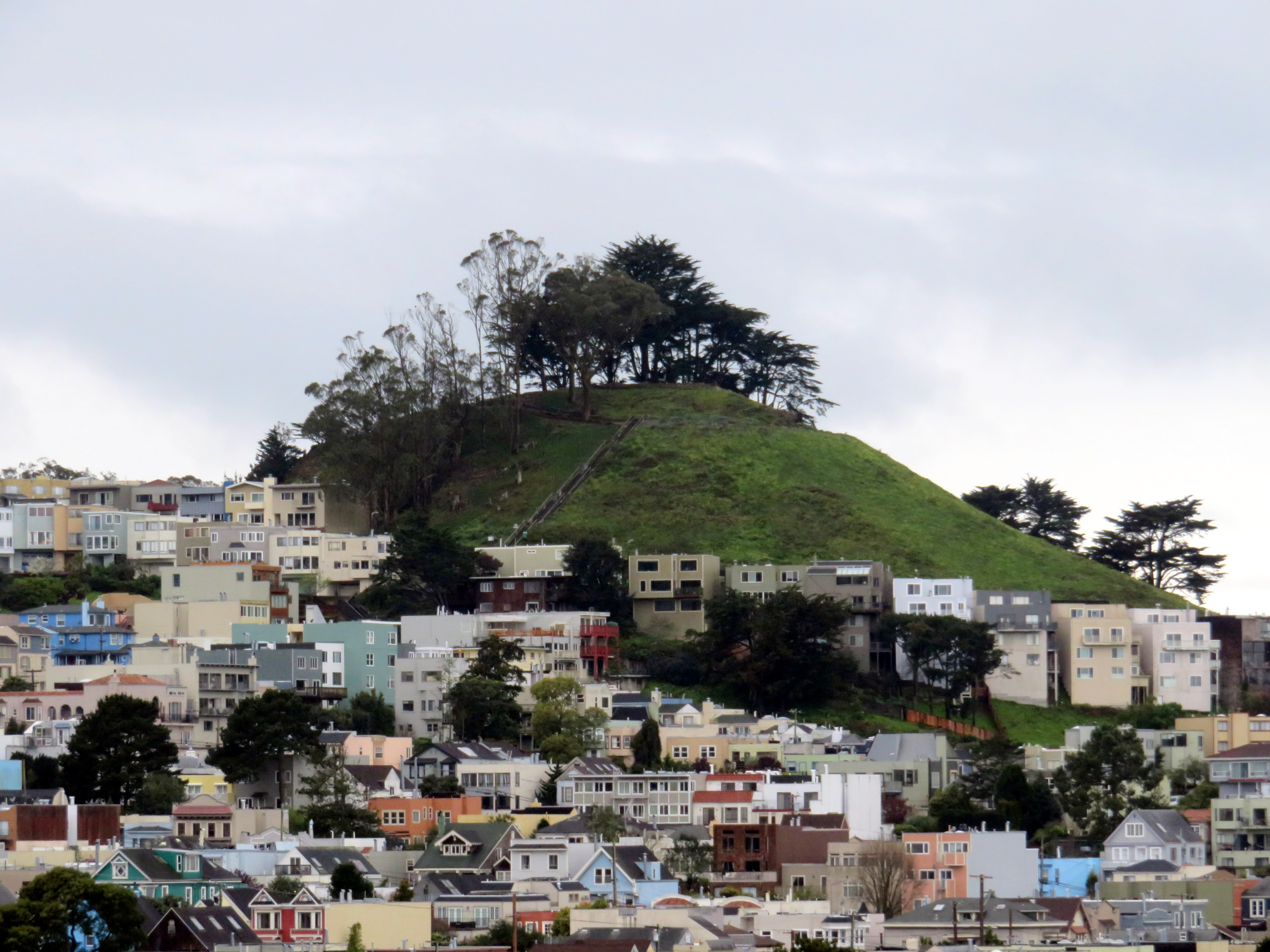
- Grandview Park viewed from Parnassus Heights in 2019
- Interactive map of Grandview Park
- Type: Municipal Park & Natural Area
- Location: Moraga & 14th Ave
- Coordinates: 37°45′23″N 122°28′18″W
- Area: 3.98 acres (1.61 ha)
- Open: 5am to Midnight

Grandview Park, also referred to as Turtle Hill by local residents, is a small, elevated park located on the West Side of San Francisco in the city's Sunset District. It is surrounded by 14th and 15th Avenues, as well as Noriega Street.

Despite its small size, 3.98 acres (1.61 ha) or about the size of a city block, the park is important geologically and botanically and offers views of downtown San Francisco, Golden Gate Park, to the Pacific Ocean, the Marin headlands, and across to the Sutro Tower.

The summit of Grandview Park rises to about 666 feet (203 m). It is an outcrop of chert, which is part of the heterogeneous assemblage known as the Franciscan Formation, or Franciscan Assemblage, the primary geologic feature on which the city of San Francisco is founded, here covered with a thin layer of sand. It provides one of the last remaining habitats within the city for a number of native plants, including the endangered Franciscan wallflower and dune tansy, and also bush lupin, beach strawberry, bush monkey flower, and coyote bush. The hill is crowned with Monterey cypress trees.

Because of the fragility of the environment, visitors to the park are asked to keep to paths.

The 16th Avenue Tiled Steps lead up to the park.
