= Giuseppe Marcinò =

Italian priest and member of the Capuchins

Venerable Giuseppe Marcinò OFMCap
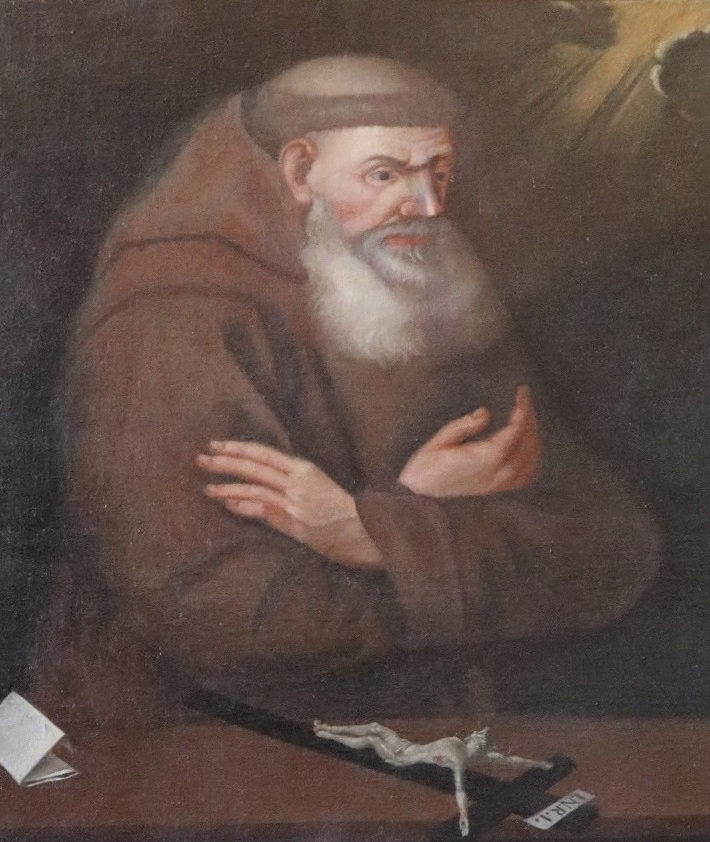
- Born: 24 October 1589; Caltagirone, Catania, Kingdom of Sicily
- Died: 16 November 1655 (aged 66); Caltagirone, Catania, Kingdom of Sicily

Giuseppe Marcinò (24 October 1589 – 16 November 1655), religious name Innocenzo of Caltagirone, was an Italian priest and a member of the Capuchins. He was well known for his frequent and often sensational predications and miracles attributed to him since 1623. Due to this he was granted the moniker of "the miracle worker of the earth".

He was declared to be Venerable in 2009 after the recognition of his life of heroic virtue. A miracle required for him to be beatified is now under investigation and must receive papal approval before beatification can take place.

== Life ==
Giuseppe Marcinò was born in Caltagirone on 24 October 1589 to Pietro Marcinò and Laura Barone. He studied in a school that the Jesuits ran and finished his studies in 1607 at the time he entered the novitiate of the Order of Friars Minor. He change his name to "Innocenzo from Caltagirone" after his formal profession as a member of the order.

He continued his studies in both philosophical and theological studies in the monasteries of places such as Malta. It was there in 1613 that he was ordained to the priesthood. He studied Hebrew in Rome after this until 1615 and returned to his home to teach Hebrew at a high school. He taught theological studies from 1619 until a decade later at Capuchin institutions. He also preached Lenten retreats.

He served as the first Minister Provincial of the Capuchin order from 1635 to 1638 in Syracuse and later in Messina from 1638 to 1640. He was then transferred in the same post in Otranto from 1642 until 1643 when he was selected as the Minister General of the order. He visited all institutions as part of his new role.

Pope Innocent X - in 1647 - dispatched him to the monarchs of Spain and France to restore peace between the two but it was something that turned out as unsuccessful. He returned home after this where he died on 16 November 1655. The place of burial soon became a pilgrimage site for those who requested his intercession with God.

== Beatification process ==
The beatification process commenced at the behest of the order on 26 September 1890 under Pope Leo XIII in a local process that ensured until 30 October 1892 and bestowed upon him the posthumous title Servant of God. The second local process saw the continuation of the assemblage of documentation and spanned from 1920 until 1922; the two processes were both ratified in 1992 in order for the cause to proceed to the next phase.

The Positio - documentation on his life of heroic virtue and an account of his life - were submitted to the Congregation for the Causes of Saints in 1995. Pope Benedict XVI approved this and declared him to be Venerable on 3 April 2009.

The miracle for his beatification was investigated and received ratification to confirm that it was a valid process on 19 December 2008.
