= Sant'Ippolito (hill) =

Archaeological site in Italy

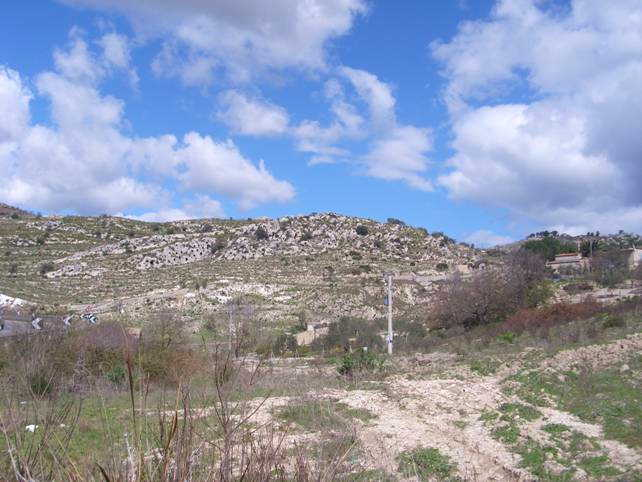

The hill of Sant'Ippolito, known by the name of “Colle del Bersaglio”, is a hill located in the Italian town of Caltagirone, in Sicily. It is made of gypsum, it is about 400 m high, and rises from the valley that is formed by the course of the river Caltagirone.

Paolo Orsi made a series of excavations here and in 1928 he gained the first important results, discovering archeological finds belonging to the Neolithic and the Copper Age.

Along the slope of the valley traces of life have been found; traces of an ancient civilization lived there until the 7th century BC. That is before the arriving of the Greeks, who founded, in that place, a reign including the current territory of Caltagirone with its archeological areas where some pointed ceramic fragments should have been found.

== Ancient village and necropolis ==
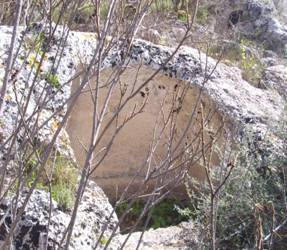

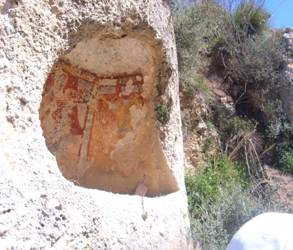

An ancient village was discovered on the lowest part of the slope, in the east side of the hill. A necropolis, with about 20 tombs called “a forno”, dug on the slope opposite the village, was also found. The necropolis was opposite the little river that flowed through the terrace where the liuts were built, and it dates back to the 13th century BC.

== The village during the “Copper Age” ==
The village of luits, dated back to “the Copper Age”, was discovered on the top of the hill, although some fragments belonged to the culture of Stentinello, proving that the area was also inhabited during the previous age. The so-called “facies” of S. Ippolito, generally indicates the type of culture of this phase, which is dated back 2000 to 1800 BC, and that is characterized by deep relationships with the Aegean-Anatolic civilizations.

== Monte San Mauro ==
=== Colli n° 1 - n° 2 ===
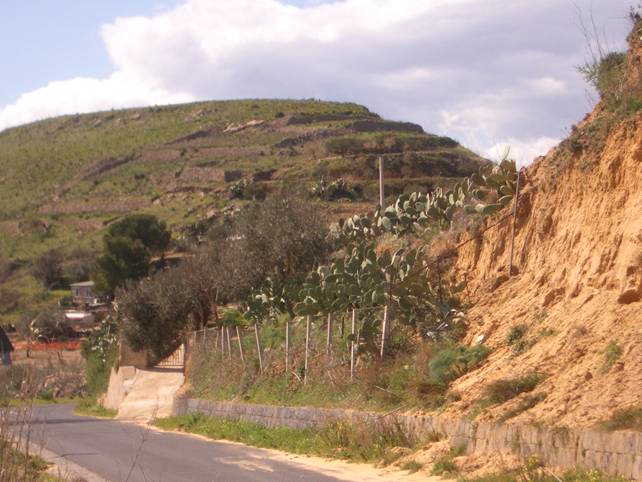

S. Mauro is an archeological place, and it is formed by three necropolis, a built-up area, some holy wells which have disappeared today. The most significant archeological find is a set of architectonic earthenware fragments that are well painted. It is possible to compare these fragments to others found in the cities of Gela, Syracuse, Selinunte and Olimpia in Greece. All these finds are dated back the end of the 16th century BC. Other fragments of “palmette” and of kalypteres egemones have been found recently. Moreover, it is important to mention that Paolo Orsi found a votive place made up of female votive statues.

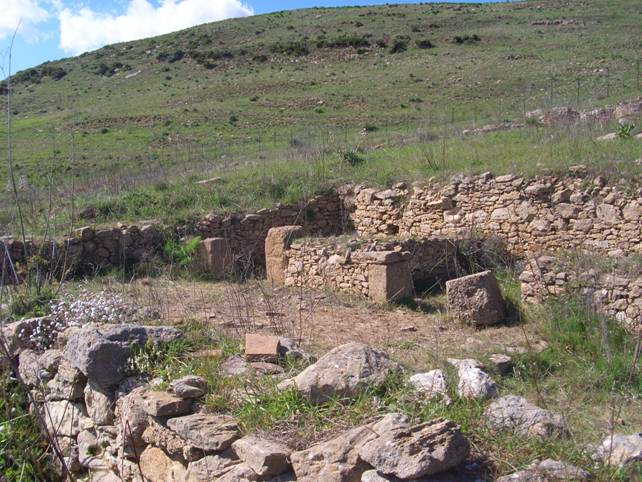

=== Colle n° 3 ===
During the first explorations, Paolo Orsi could identify a system of defensive walls spaced at intervals by projections of rock along the northwest edge of the hill.

Houses have been uncovered. Their quadrangular plan divided in a big rectangular space opened to world the outside and generally turned to the South; on this space there are other two square rooms, smaller than the rectangular one, that often have an added storey. This has been discovered thanks to the observations and research that archeologists have done.

The presence of big pithoi (see below) to store large quantities of food, is very interesting. In 1994, Paolo Orsi discovered a building with a rectangular plan, that was divided in two parts by a wall made with blocks of stone of that area which were linked together with heap of stones and soil. These digs were continued by U. Spigo in 1983 and they revealed that next to the west side of the building existed another space, and near it there also was an added storey with a long footpath. This room was characterized by the presence of many ceramic fragments of vases and plates used for food, and by fusaroles and handlooms.

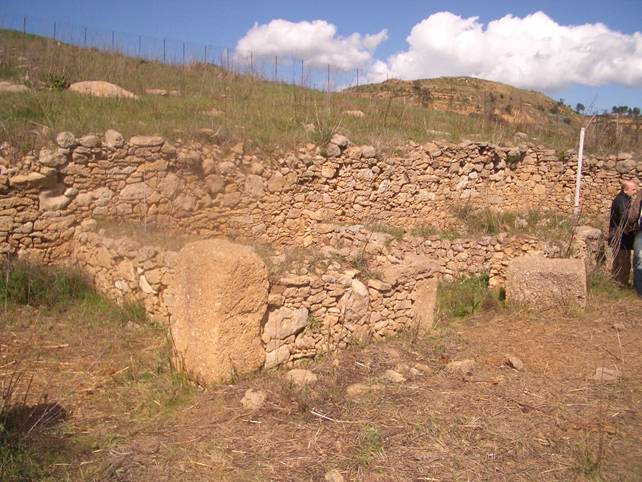

== Necropolis ==
At the foot of the hill n° 3, in 1903–1904, a necropolis of the 7th and 6th centuries BC was dug. Some 58 graves were discovered and most of them had already been plundered by the local peasants. The type of burial was that of the “Cappucina”* with the coffin covered with slabs. It was called “simple grave”.

== La Cappuccina ==
The Cappuccina was a simple way of burial without cremation or with a partial cremation and was used during the Roman Age and the Medieval period; the dead was placed in a grave dug in tophus and then he/she was covered with tiles. Sometimes the tiles were simply put to close the grave at ground level with curved tiles placed laterally put between the tiles and the ground; sometimes the tiles were placed in a pitched way in the grave (like a tent); they were placed on the shorter side, with the lateral edges up, put closer together; on the edges the bodies were placed and other tiles were used to cover the upper corner of the tiles; finally all was covered by the soil that filled the grave.

== Pithoi ==
Pithoi were very large earthenware containers used for storage in ancient times. They held liquids such as wine and oil, and also solids in granular form such as salt.
