= Granieri =

- Frazione
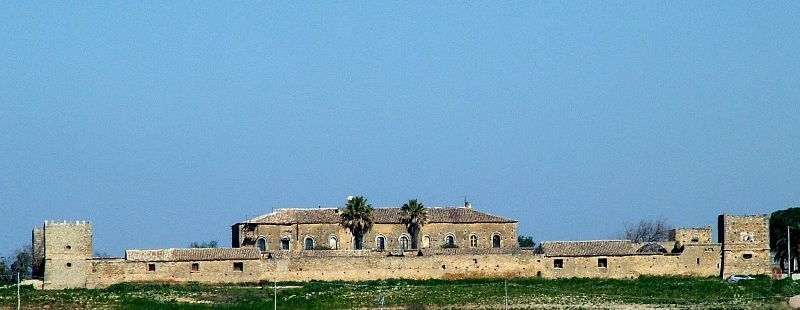

- Location of Granieri in Italy
- Coordinates: 37°7′46″N 14°34′45″E
- Country: Italy
- Region: Sicily
- Province: Catania (CT)
- Comune: Caltagirone
- Elevation: 351 m (1,152 ft)

Population (2001)
  - Total: 400
- Demonym: Granieresi
- Time zone: UTC+1 (CET)
  - Summer (DST): UTC+2 (CEST)
- Postal code: 95041
- Dialing code: (+39) 0933
- Patron saint: St. John the Baptist
- Saint day: August 29
- Website: Official website

Granieri is a southern Italian village and hamlet (frazione) of Caltagirone (18 km far), a municipality in the province of Catania, Sicily. It has an altitude of 351 metres above sea level and a population of 400.

== Cuisine ==
The village lies in an area where vineyards are cultivated and wine is produced. It is known for its Granieri Cake.

== Gallery ==
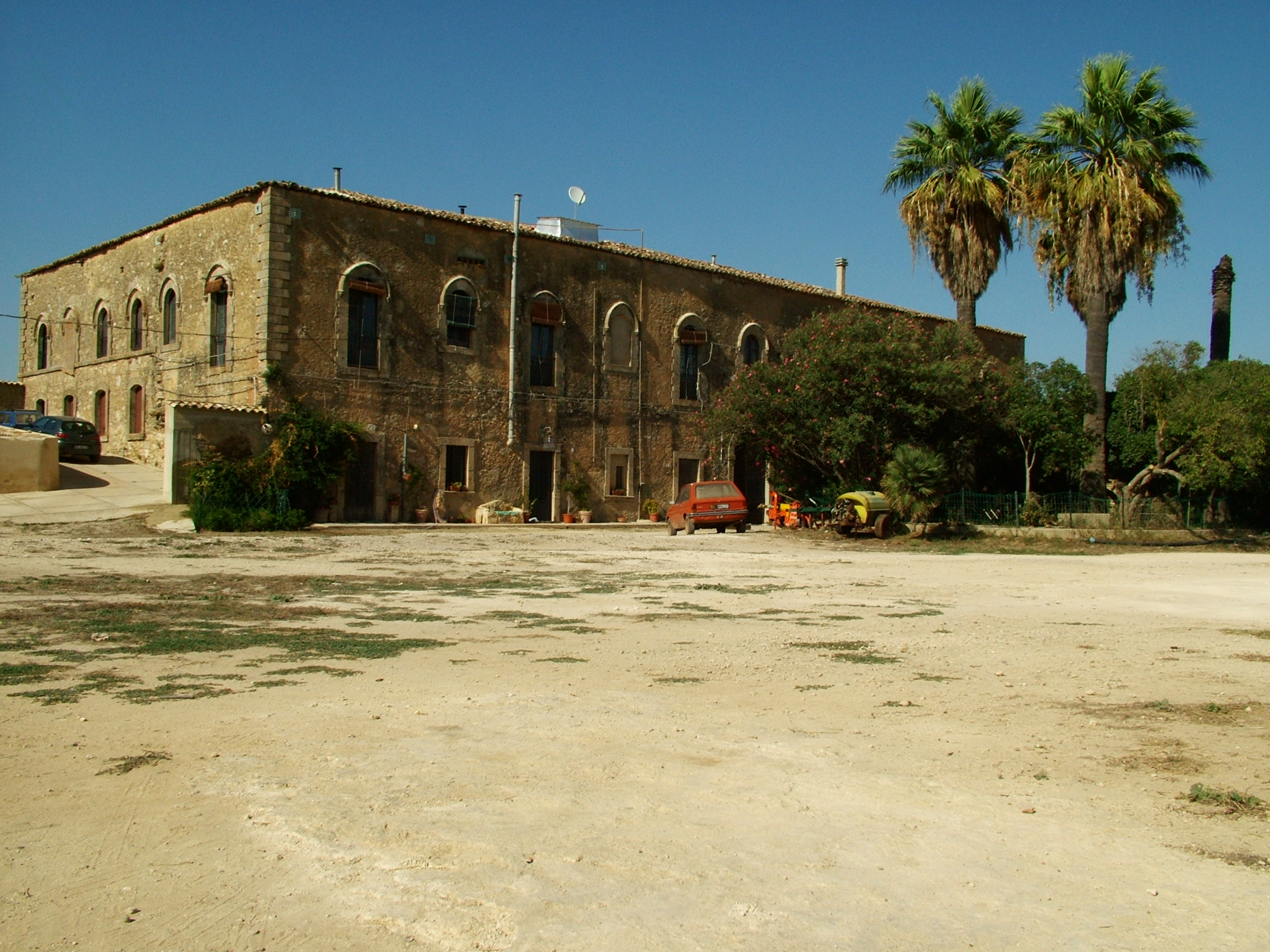

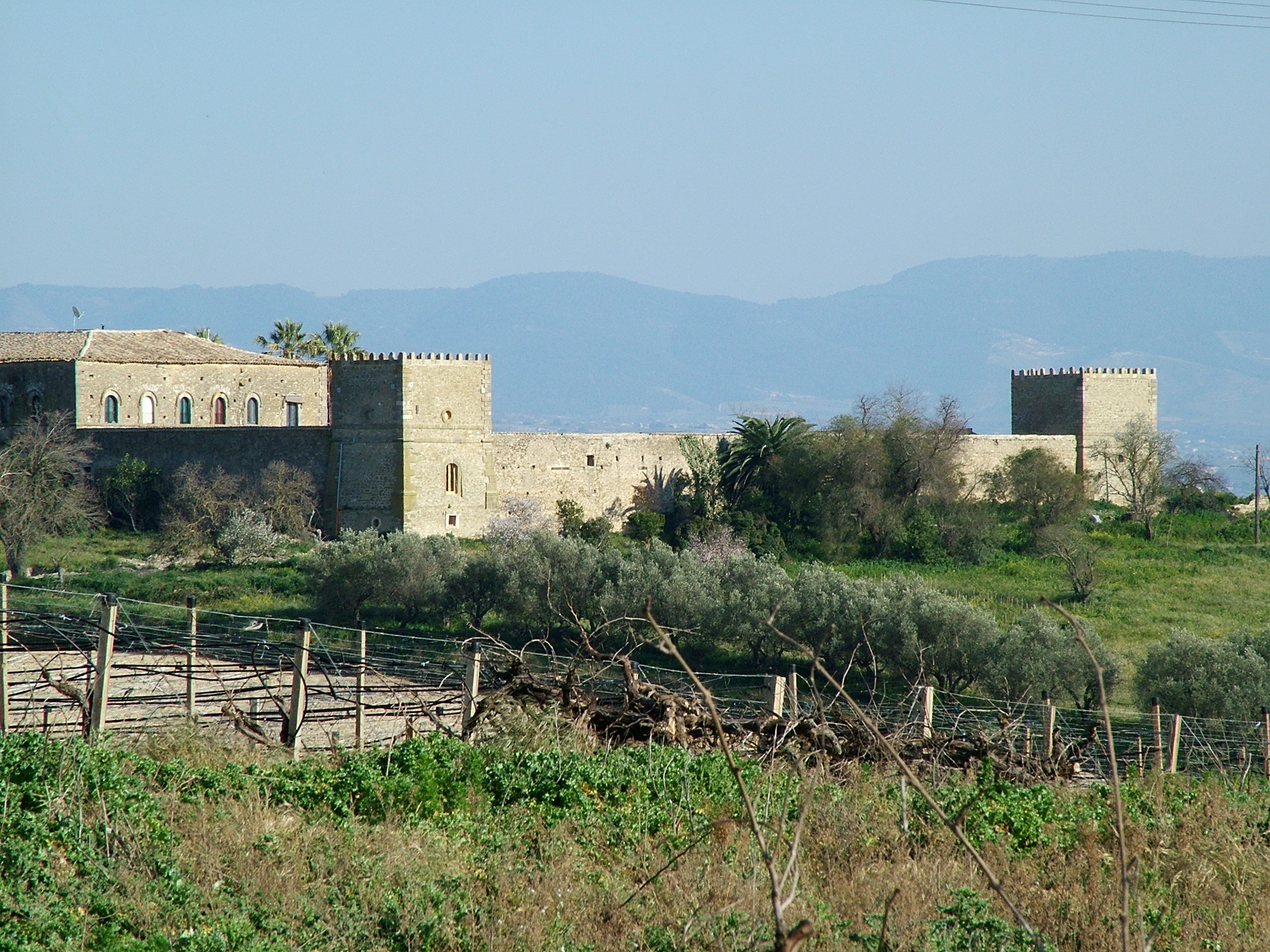

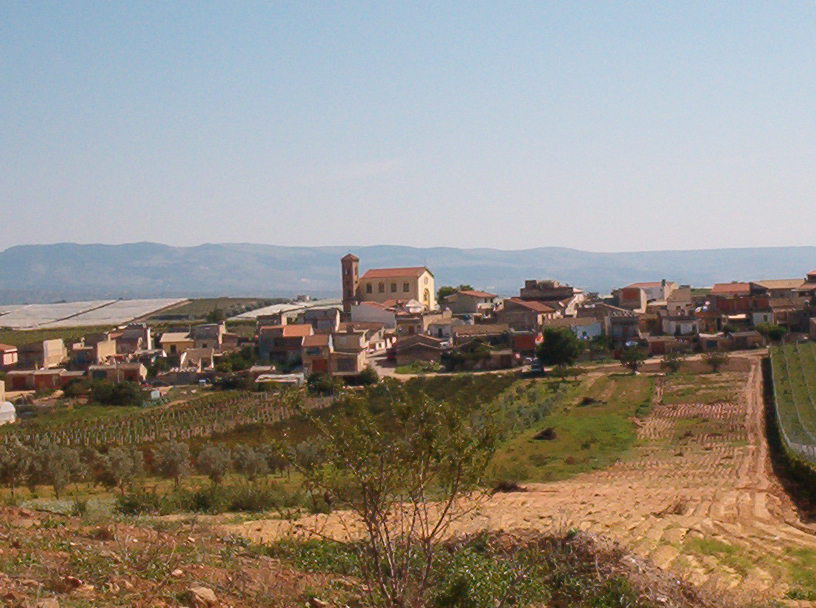
