= San Francesco di Paola, Caltagirone =

Baroque Roman Catholic church

Coordinates: 37.23393°N 14.51443°E

San Francesco di Paola is a Baroque architecture, Roman Catholic parish church located in Caltagirone in the region of Sicily, Italy.

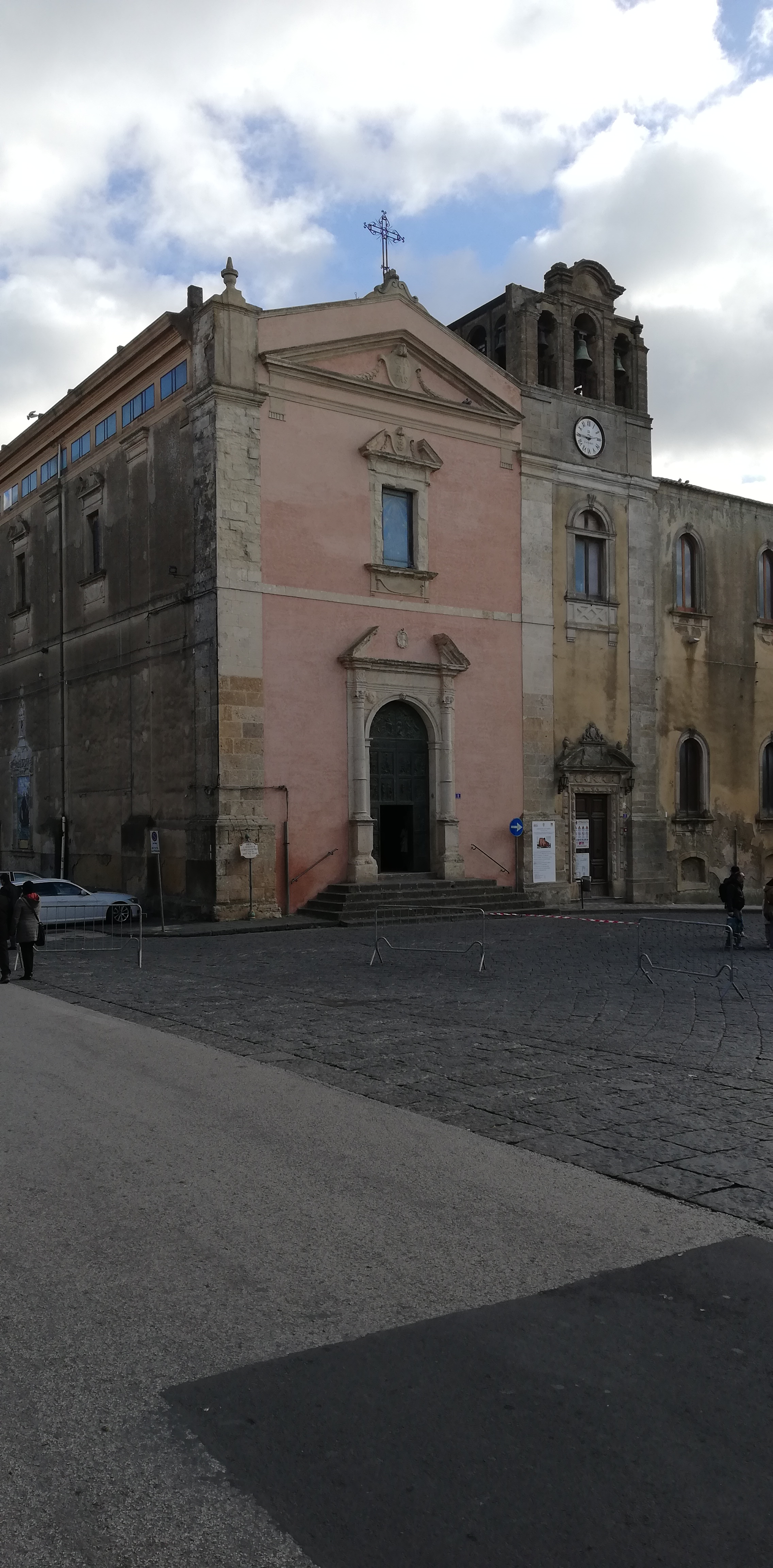

== History and description ==
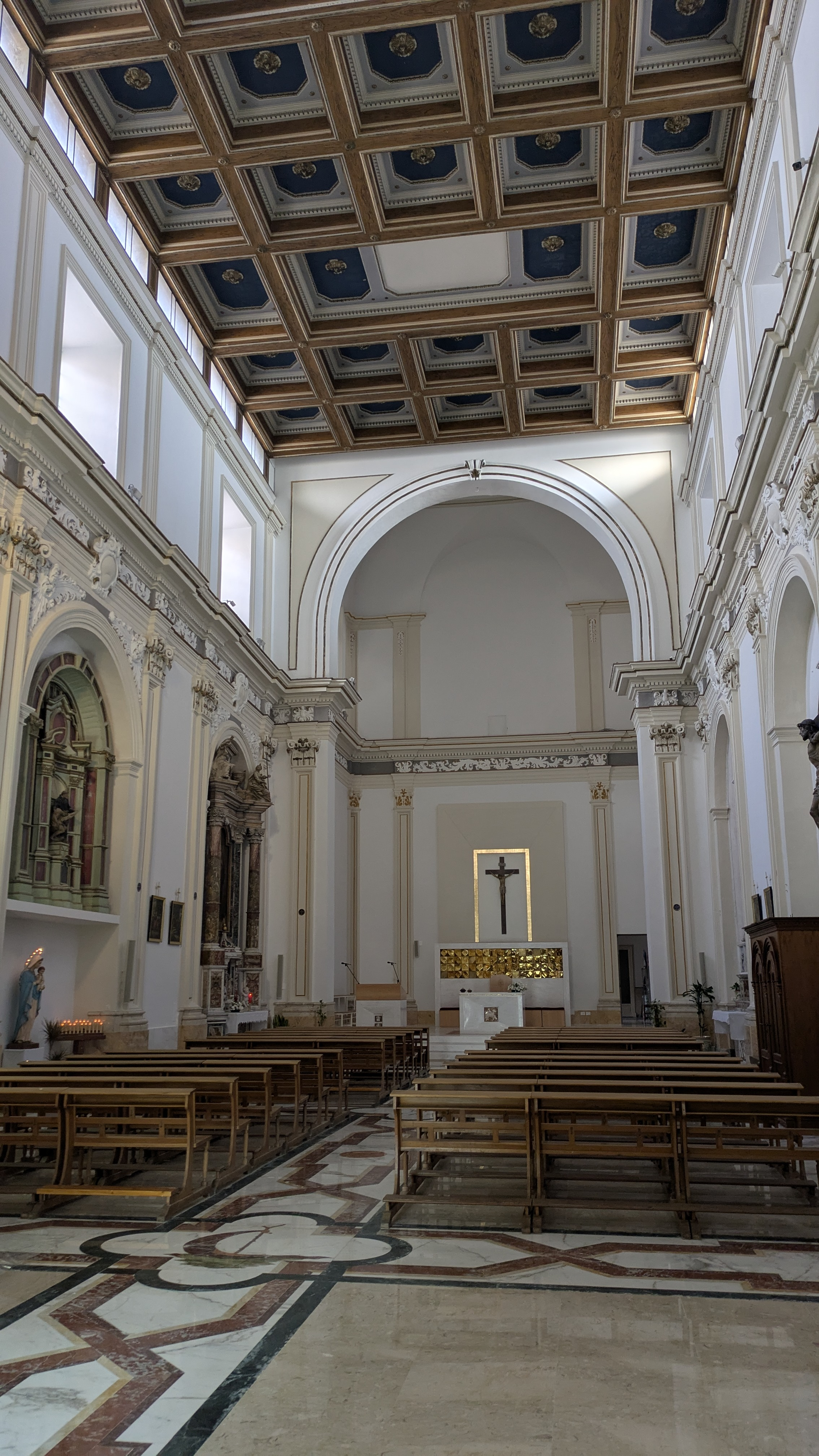
The interior

A church at the site was erected in 1593, replacing a small chapel or oratory dedicated to St Anthony the Great, belonging to an adjacent Dominican monastery. Damaged slightly by the 1693 earthquake, remaining intact were the facade and left flank and portal with a maiolica plaque depicting the travels of St Francis of Paola across the straits of Messina. The church was made a parish church in 1926, and the interior decoration derives from other churches.
