= San Giacomo, Caltagirone =

Church building in Caltagirone, Italy

Coordinates: 37.23768°N 14.50901°E

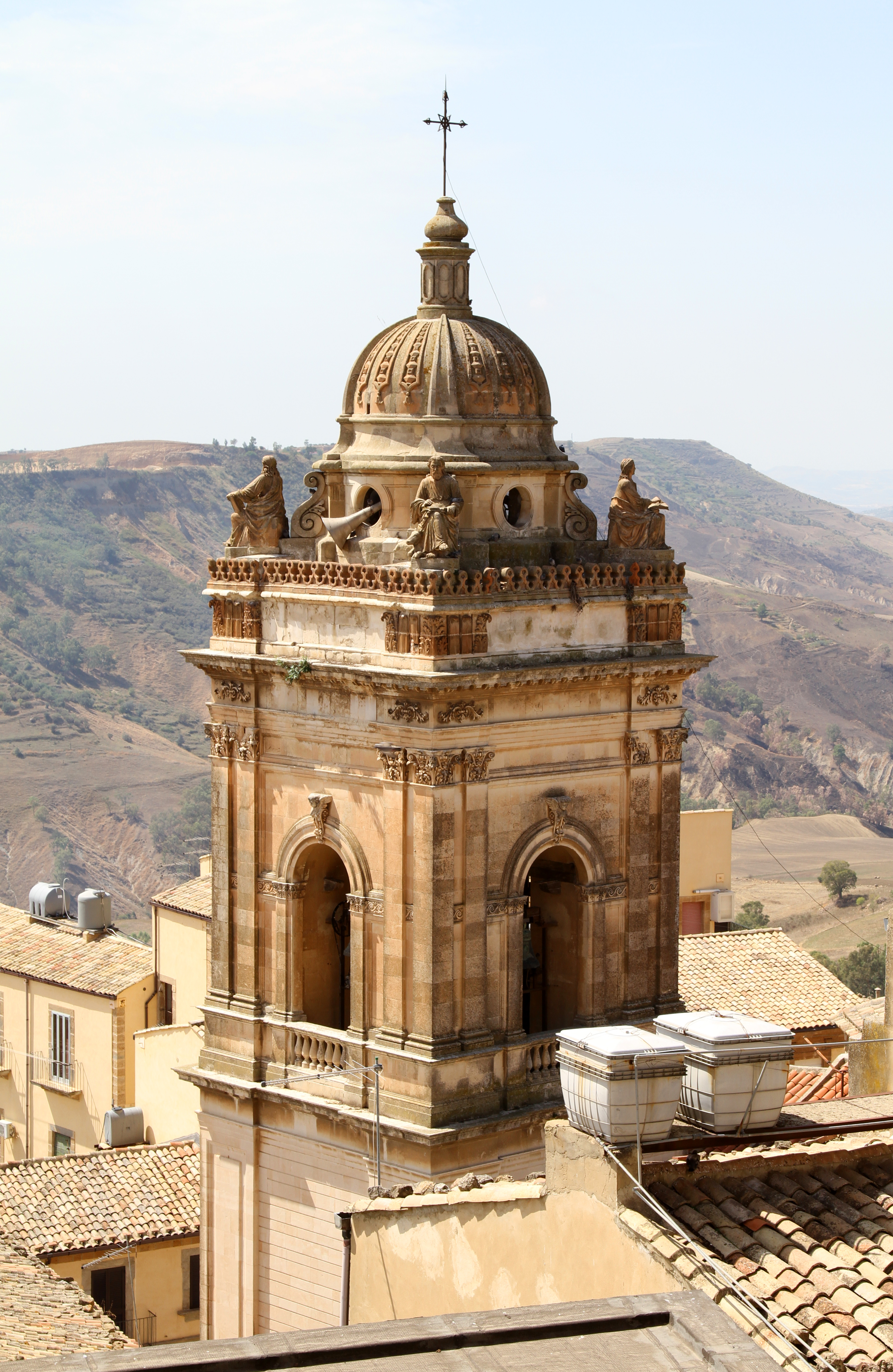
Bell-tower of San Giacomo

San Giacomo is a Baroque architecture, Roman Catholic parish church located in Caltagirone in the region of Sicily, Italy.

== History and description ==
The construction of this church was said to have followed a nearby military victory by Count Roger I of Sicily over the Saracens on July 25, 1090 (the feast day of St James the Great).

It was nearly razed by the 1693 Sicily earthquake. Apparently, much of the town was in the church at prayer when the earthquake toppled the roof, killing some 700 persons. The church was also rebuilt after World War II due to bombardment in 1943.

The bell-tower, located behind the flank of the apse, with four terracotta evangelists, was added in the 19th century. The facade has volutes connecting the center to the aisles; the window frames and cornices are highly decorated. The bronze doors are modern. The interior houses a relic, putatively the arm of St James, inside a silver box engraved with reliefs depicting the life of the saint by Nibilio and Giuseppe Gagini; the statue of St James (1517) was made by Vincenzo Archifel; There is a reliquary containing relics of the Blessed Lucia. The church also has a 14th-century reliquary containing the skull of the Polish knights templar, the blessed Gerlando. On 25 July, a procession carries the statue of St James through the town.
