= San Giorgio, Caltagirone =

Baroque Roman Catholic church

Coordinates: 37.23393°N 14.51443°E

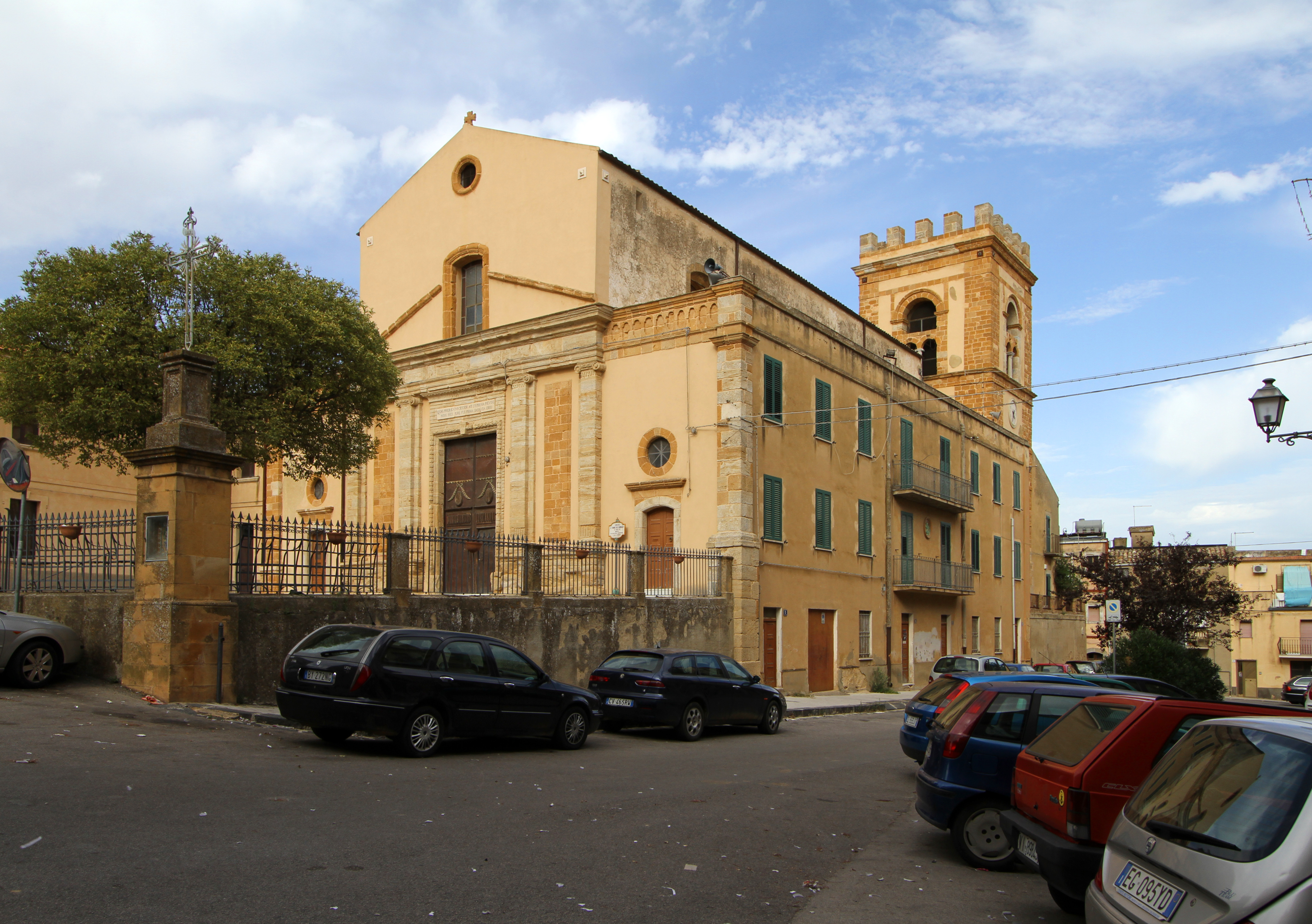
Church of San Giorgio

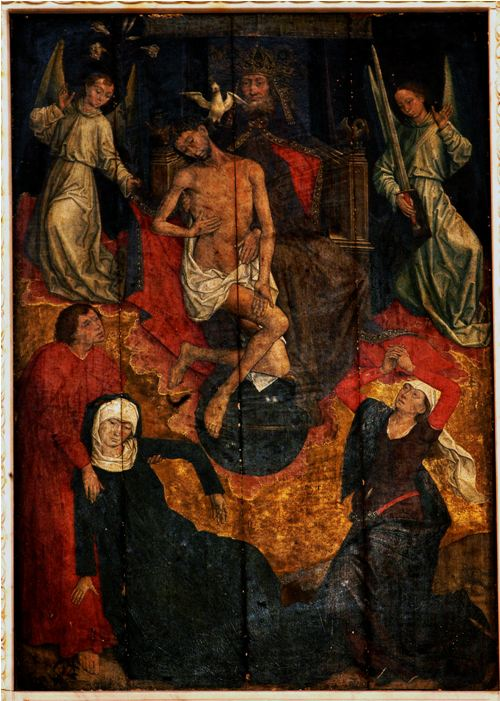
Trinity by Flemish painter

San Giorgio is a Roman Catholic parish church located in Caltagirone in the region of Sicily, Italy.

== History and description ==
A church at the site was originally erected in 1030 by Genovese mercenaries to celebrate the expulsion of the Saracens from Sicily. That church was destroyed by the 1693 Sicily earthquake, and promptly rebuilt. The bell tower is unusual due to its merlionated roofline. The interior has ceiling frescoes depicting St George, by Bernardino Bongiovanni. The church has an altarpiece depicting the Trinity attributed to the Flemish painter Rogier van der Weyden or his pupil Vrancke van der Stockt. The canvas was donated to the church by the baronessa di Favarotta Donna Agata Interlandi.
