= Caltagirone Ceramics =

Type of ceramics made in Sicily, Italy

The Ceramica di Caltagirone is a type of ceramics made in Caltagirone, in Sicily. This pottery is one of the most documented and stylistically varied, as well as one of the best known in the world.

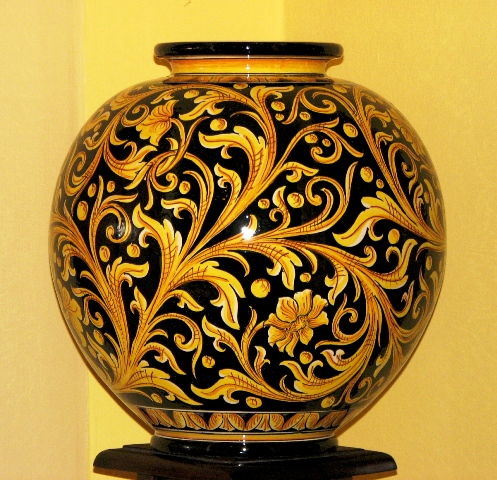
A ceramic cup of Caltagirone

His historical knowledge is based on recent research carried out in the context of the creation of the Museum of Ceramics , first at the local School of Ceramics and then at its own headquarters under the aegis of Italian Republic and Sicily Region. Caltagirone has been declared a World Heritage Site by UNESCO.

== History ==
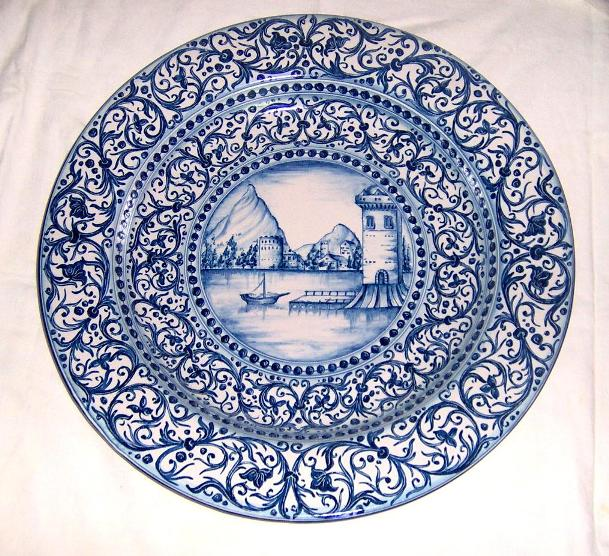
Ceramic Fangotto

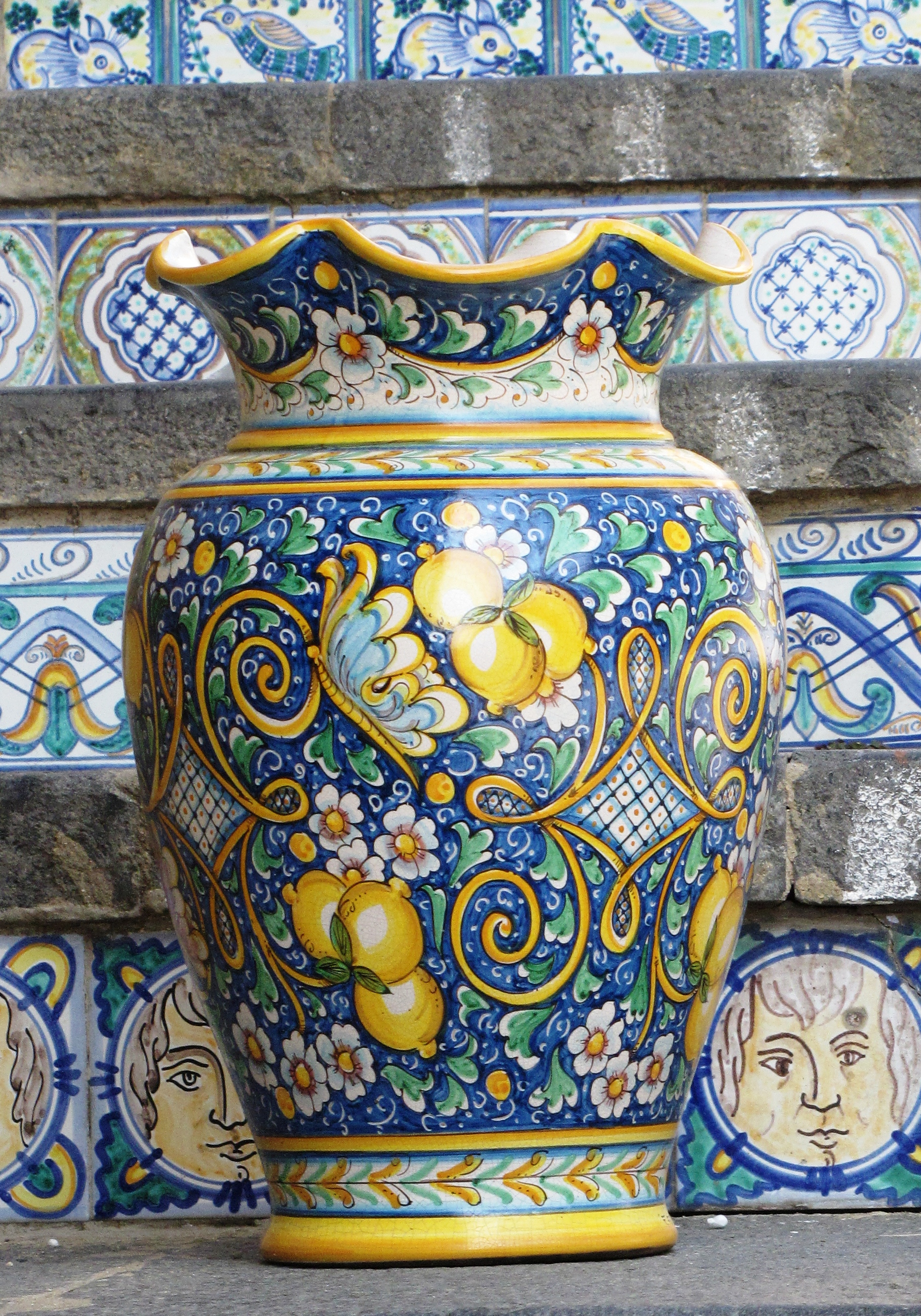
Ceramics from Caltagirone

The archaeological data obtained in the excavations carried out by Paolo Orsi in the area of Caltagirone confirm what the Jesuit Giampaolo Chiarandà wrote in passing in his history of the city of Piazza Armerina. There the art of ceramics had preceded Arab Sicily and was practiced "by many potters". The reasons why Caltagirone pottery had a significant boost in the Middle Ages are not only in the quality of clays, but also in the immense nearby woods that provided the firewood to cook the artifacts in ovens for the many potters locations. Caltagirone's "quarters" for containing honey were known everywhere, as the honey production mentioned by the Arab geographer Edrisi. They are also mentioned in inventories of donated goods, such as that of 1596 by Don Matteo Calascibetta, Barón of Costumino. In Caltagirone there are also some important educational centers dedicated to ceramics. In 1918, Don Luigi Sturzo founded the "State Institute of Art in Ceramics", where he trained artisans who could continue this local tradition.

== The whistles ==
A characteristic prehistoric object is found in the Museum of Ceramics of Caltagirone (founded in 1965) and that it had not been understood before the restoration. The bellies communicate through numerous holes. In the center, communicating externally with the two bottles, a nozzle is applied that should be used to introduce air by blowing them. With two pots full of water and the introduction of air through the beak, it must have determined a characteristic gurgle, which probably served for hunting in the forest as a call for birds and other animals.

== Cribs ==
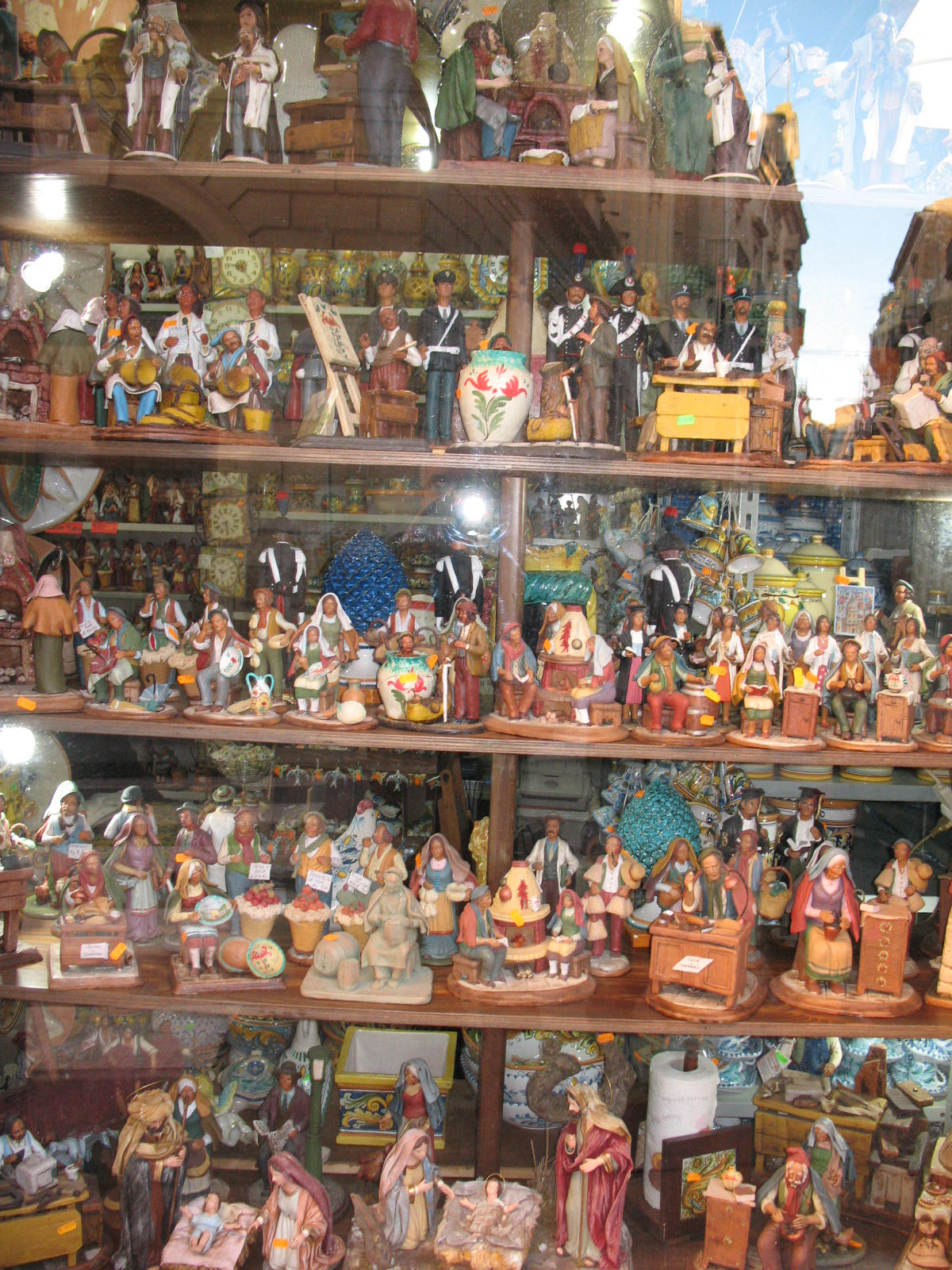
Elements for the crib

In Caltagirone, the first examples of ceramic figures for the Nativity scene, probably date in the Middle Ages. In the 18th century we had Antonio Branciforte and Antonio Margioglio among the "sanctuaries", a true category of artisans who produced statuettes of Holy Family and saints for nativity scenes. The spread of the ritual dates back to the beginning of the 18th century, when families from all social classes competed with each other to create the most beautiful scenery or the most detailed figurine in the city. In fact, it is the scenes of popular, peasant and pastoral life that inspire the master craftsmen.

At the end of the century, this tradition reached high artistic levels promoting tourism in the city of Caltagirone. In the city, there are two ceramic museums, the "civic museum" which also houses a gallery of contemporary ceramics and the "regional museum".

== See also ==
- Made in Italy
