= Santa Maria del Monte, Caltagirone =

Baroque Roman Catholic church

Coordinates: 37.23955°N 14.51170°E

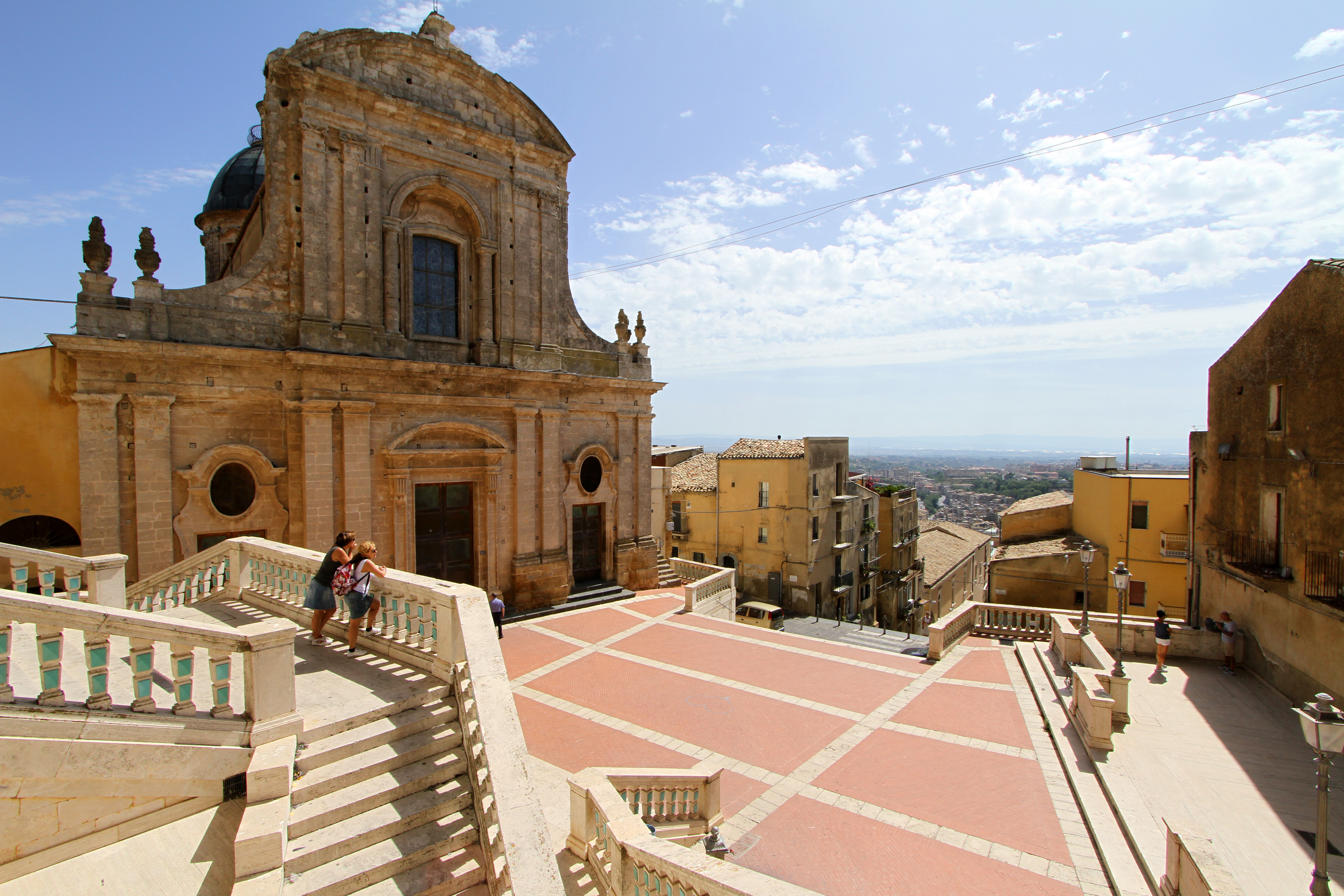
View of facade and piazza, the steps descend to the right

Santa Maria del Monte is a Roman Catholic parish church located in Caltagirone in the region of Sicily, Italy.

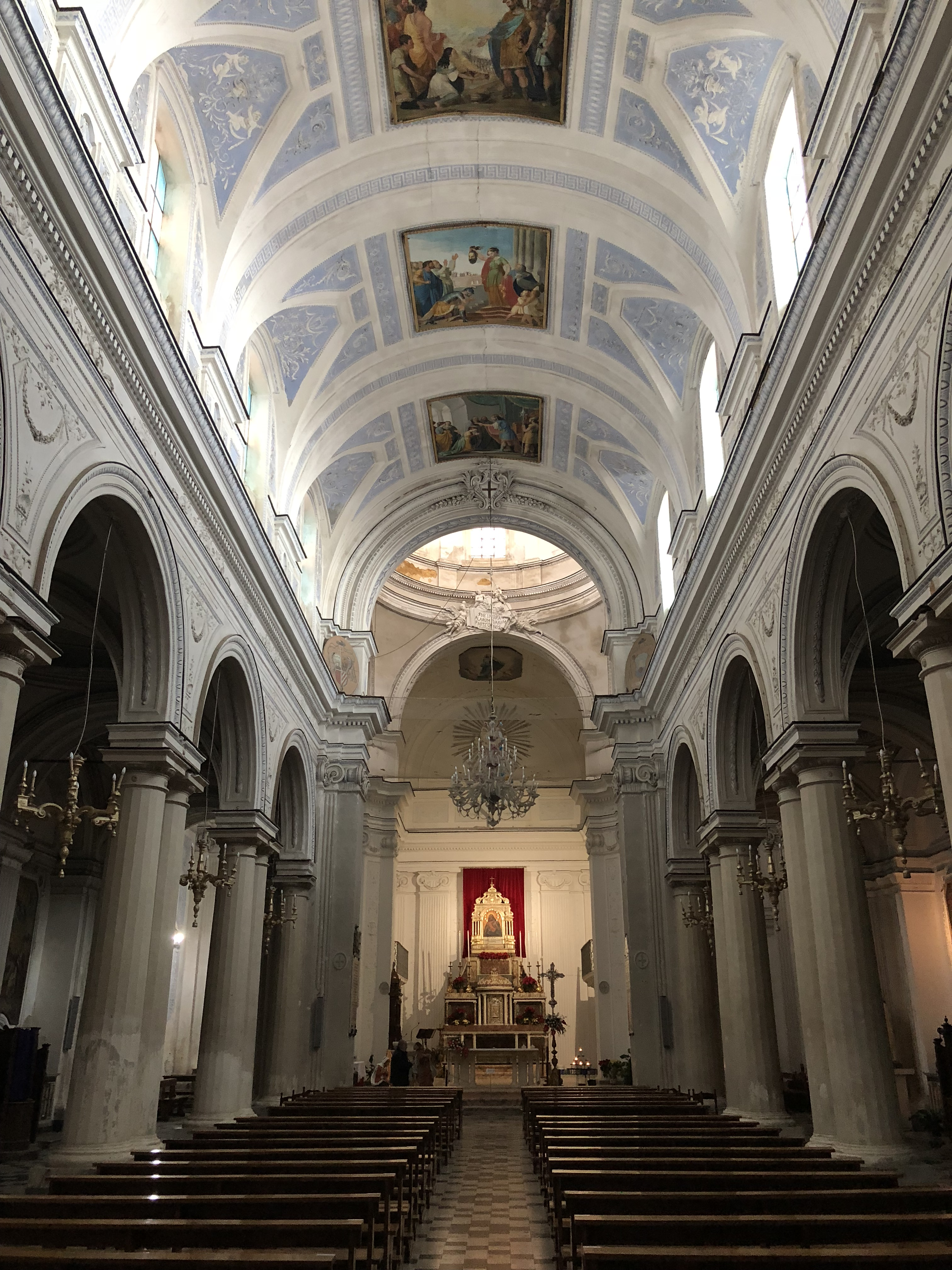
Interior view towards the apse with three frescoed ceiling panels visible.

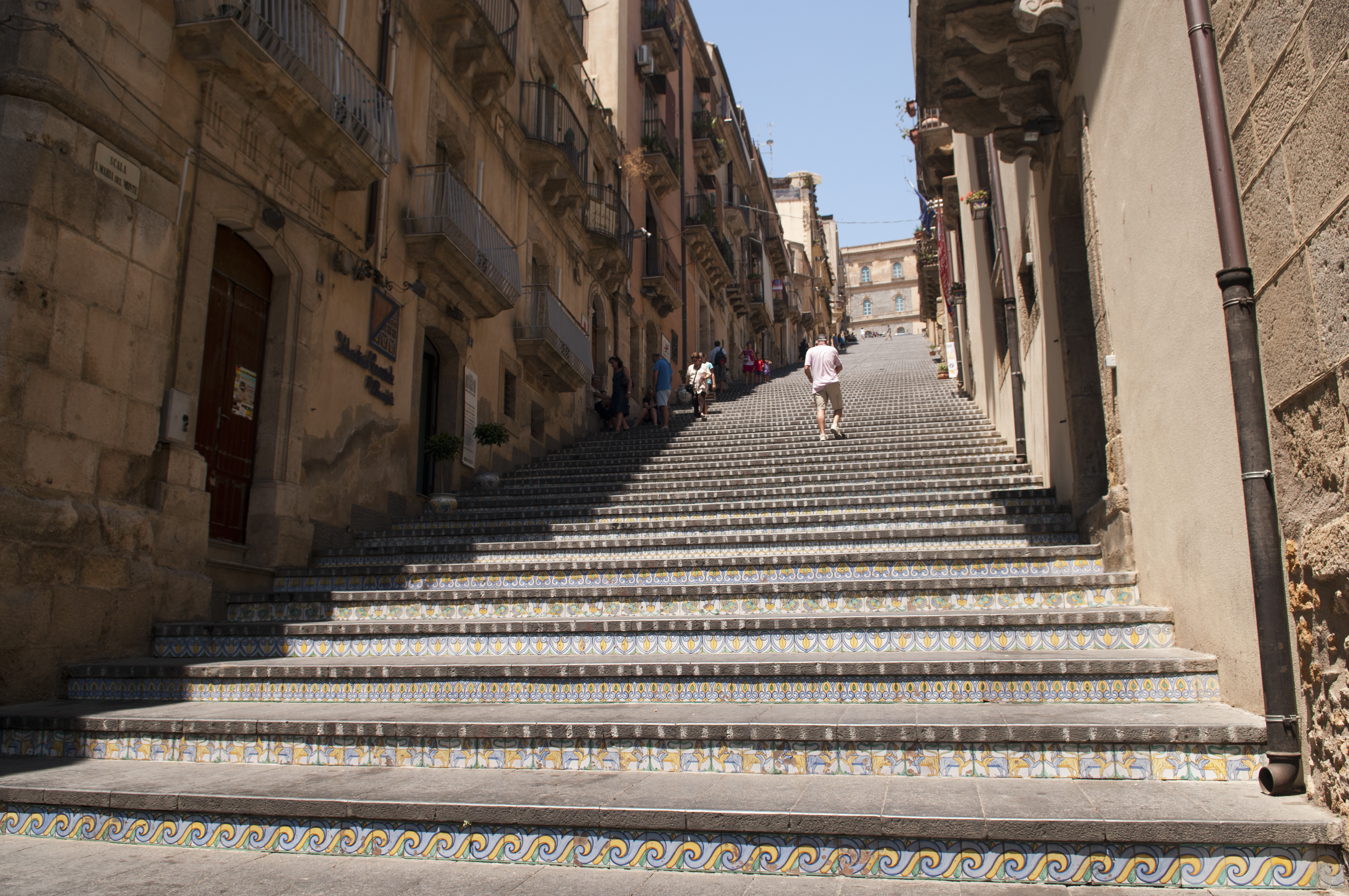
Staircase of Santa Maria del Monte from the lower town

The church is located above the town, in the oldest part of the town, and previously dedicated to the Marian devotion of the Virgin of the Assumption. Prior to the construction of the Duomo of San Giuliano, this church served as the main church in town. The church has undergone many reconstructions and refurbishments. It is best known for rising at the top of the maoilica-decorated staircase of Santa Maria del Monte in town. The facade faces west, while the stairs descend southeast from the piazza in front of the church.

The interior of the church is decorated with frescoes painted in the first half of the 19th century by the brothers Vaccaro. depicting heroines in the Old Testament such as Rebecca, Abigail, Judith and Esther, all of whom in some Christian exegeses foretell the coming of Mary. The sculpture on altar of the Madonna del Salterio is attributed to Domenico Gagini, the altarpiece depicting the Presentation of Mary at the Temple was commissioned by the Boscarelli Sturzo family. The altar with the wooden icon of Christ at the Column (1592) was sculpted by Paolo Nigro. The church also houses the venerated 13th-century icon of the Madonna di Conadomini, depicting a Maddona and child on one side and a Risen Christ on the other.

== See also ==
- 18th-century Western domes
