= Chkalov Stairs =

Staircase, a landmark of Nizhny Novgorod

- Stairs
- Russian: Чкаловская лестница
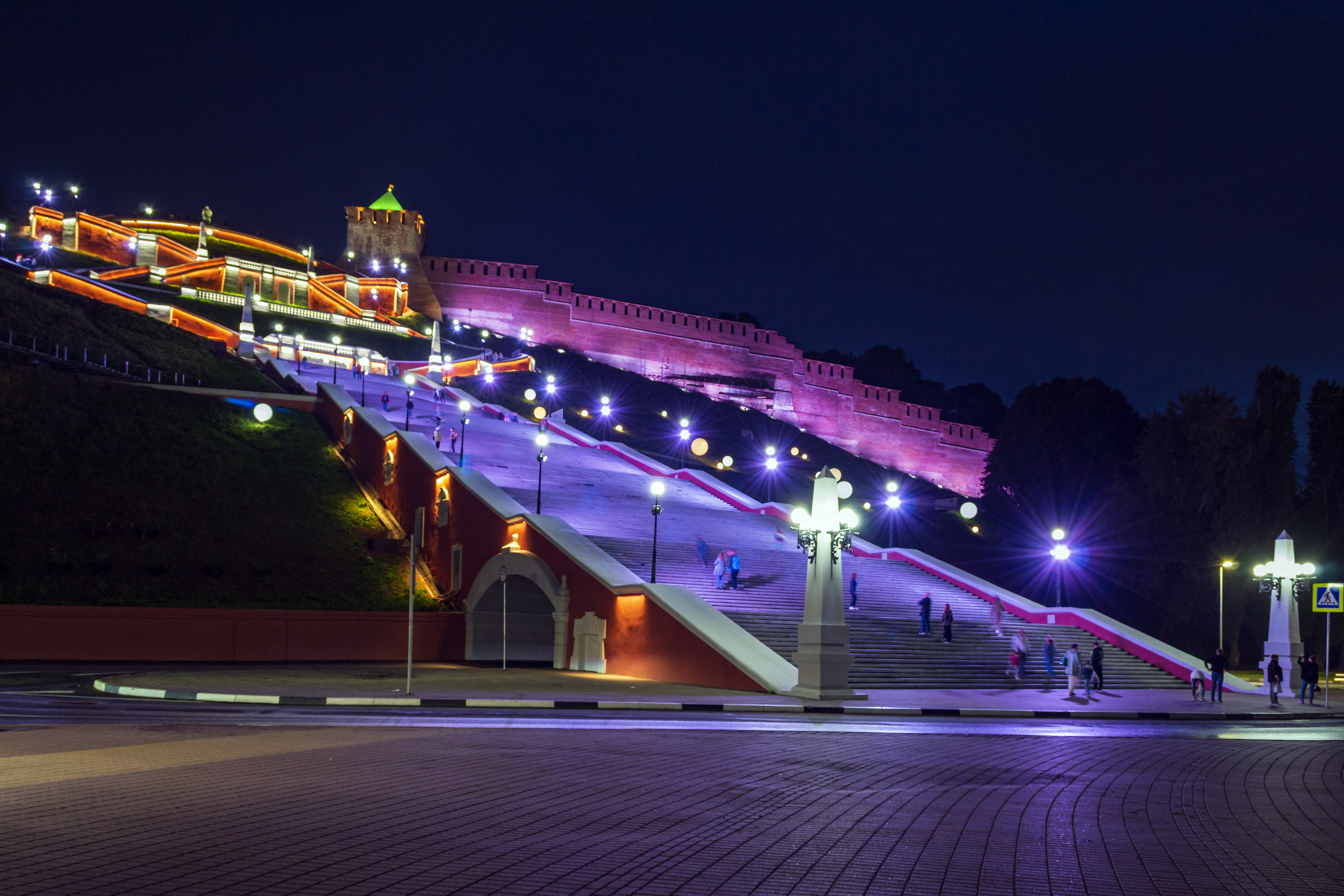
- Design: Alexander Yakovlev; Lev Rudnev; Vladimir Munts
- Constructed: 1943-1949
- Opened: 1949
- Steps: 560
- Dedicated to: Valery Chkalov
- Location: Russia, Nizhny Novgorod
- Interactive map of Chkalov Stairs
- Coordinates: 56°19′51″N 44°00′34″E

The Chkalov Stairs (Russian: Чкаловская лестница) is a monumental flight of steps in the center of Nizhny Novgorod, connecting Minin and Pozharsky Square, the Upper Volga and the Lower Volga embankments. It was built by the architects Alexander Yakovlev, Lev Rudnev and Vladimir Munts. It is the longest staircase in Russia. The staircase starts from the monument to Chkalov, near the St. George's Tower of the Kremlin. It is built in the form of a figure of eight and consists of 560 steps, if you count it both sides. The number of steps from the bottom to the top is 442 on the right. In the intersections of the side slopes there are two observation platforms. At the bottom of the stairs is a monument to the boat "Hero", which is located at the Lower-Volga embankment.

== History ==
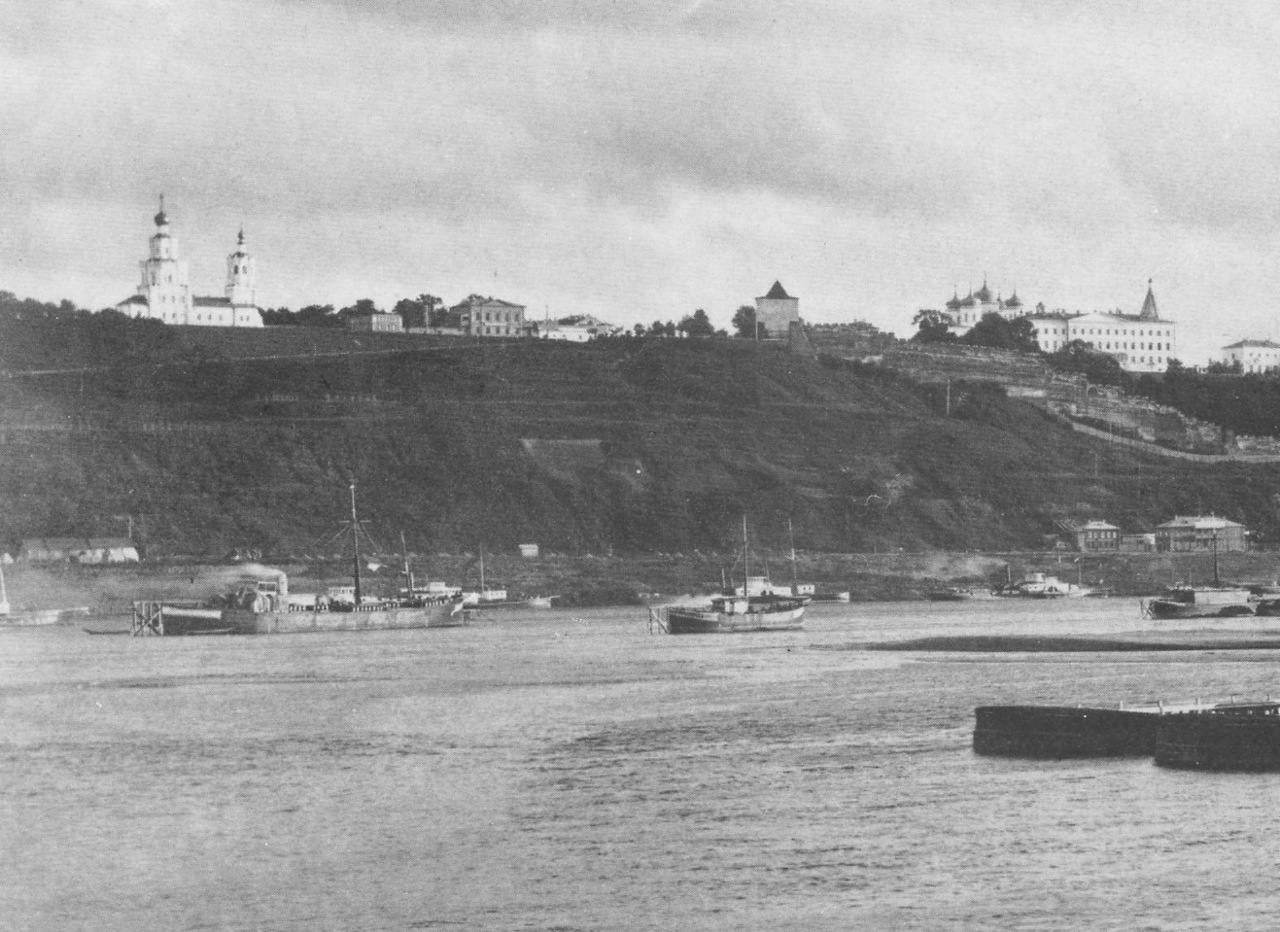
View of the Volga slope from the village of Bor. 1886

During the Russian Empire and until the mid-1940s of the 20th century, the site of the Chkalov Stairs was called the Volga slope. It was one of the most popular places among Nizhny Novgorod residents and visitors. At the top was a semicircular ledge from which a view of the floodplain of Bor. Now there is a monument to Valery Chkalov. The monument was erected in 1940.

The first ideas for the construction of the stairs on the Volga slope was put forward by Alexander Shulpin, the chairman of the Gorky City Executive Committee, in 1939. The stairs were to connect the center of the city with the Volga, and outdo the Potemkin Stairs in Odessa. But the realisation of the project was prevented by World War II (Eastern Front).

The realisation of the plans was delayed until 1943. That year, Gorky began actively rebuilding the destroyed buildings and industrial enterprises after the German bombing. Then Shulpin began to promote his idea again. In the same year he went on a business trip to Moscow and presented the project to the Leningrad architects Alexander Yakovlev, Lev Rudnev and Vladimir Munts. When the agreement was received, the Moscow government allocated money for the construction of this grandiose staircase in honor of the victory of the Battle of Stalingrad. The staircase itself was to be called the Stalingrad Stairs. Construction was started the same year, carried out by German prisoners. The staircase was inaugurated in 1949. The chairman of the city executive committee spent about 7 million rubles on its construction, and was arrested for embezzling public funds in the Leningrad affair. He was rehabilitated after Stalin's death.

== Present day ==
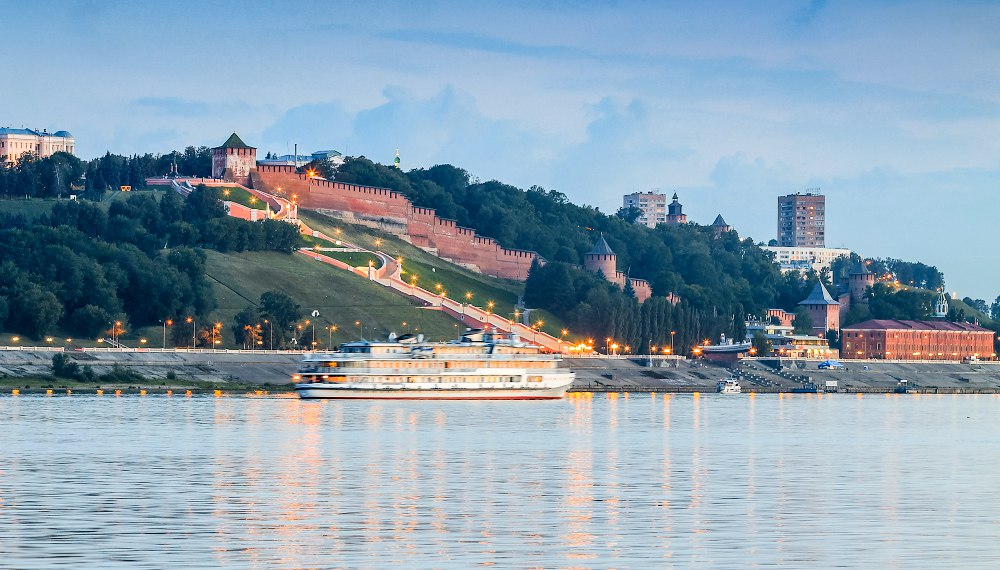
View from the Volga to the Chkalovskaya Stairs

The staircase is one of the most recognizable landmarks of the city. On the Chkalov Stairs they arrange sports races.

The last restoration of the staircase was carried out in 2012-2013.
