= One Brick =

- Formation: 2001
- Type: Service club
- Region served: World Wide
- Members: 100,000
- Key people: Clive Charlwood, Dave Shefferman, Brian Gee
- Website: http://www.onebrick.org

One Brick is a 501(c)(3) non-profit service organization organized in twelve cities in the United States.

== History ==
One Brick was founded in San Francisco in 2001. The founders were three friends, who recognized that a large number of volunteers are put off the volunteer experience by the necessity to attend orientations and make a regular commitment to a particular organization. The goal of One Brick is therefore to provide a sustainable volunteer pool to non-profit organizations by making the volunteer experience convenient and social.

With growth of the San Francisco chapter, new One Brick chapters were founded in New York (2002), Chicago (2004), Washington, DC (2006), Minneapolis (2008), Seattle (2009), Orlando (2010), Detroit (2011), Silicon Valley(2011), Philadelphia (2012), Los Angeles (2012), Boston (2012) One Brick Builds (2017) and New Orleans (2018).

Since it started, One Brick has contributed almost 630,000 volunteer hours (315 person years) to non-profit organizations in these cities. One Brick has also hosted over 25 work teams in New Orleans where they have contributed to assisting reconstruction efforts for communities affected by Hurricane Katrina. In 2017 One Brick founded the new One Brick Builds chapter to assist rebuilding in New Orleans but also in other distant communities hit by natural disaster such as Baton Rouge, Columbia SC (Hurricane Joaquin), Wall Township NJ (Hurricane Sandy).

== Structure ==
One Brick membership is open to individuals 21 or older. Volunteers join through the organization's website, and are then able to register for One Brick events, which are listed on an online calendar. Volunteers sign-up for events that interest them and fit within their schedules. As the organization is built on the premise of "commitment-free volunteering," volunteers are not required to attend a minimum number of events.

One Brick 'event managers' liaise between volunteers and representatives of partner non-profits, and organize after-event socials. The managers are volunteers who have undergone training to be able to coordinate the needs of the volunteers and non-profit partner organizations. The primary role of the manager is to ensure that the volunteers know where and when an event is taking place and to provide records of which members attended an event to chapter management.

Within an individual One Brick chapter, a management team oversees administration. These activities include reaching out to non-profit partners to set up new One Brick events, fundraising, and marketing. The management team is staffed entirely by volunteers, who are typically experienced One Brick managers. At the national level, One Brick is run by an Executive Director, who ensures collaboration between the chapters in different cities.

== Activities ==
One Brick operates by connecting volunteers with non-profit partner organizations. Over 1,600 organizations have partnered with One Brick, including Habitat for Humanity, American Heart Association, DC Central Kitchen, and the Greater Chicago Food Depository. The exact activity performed by volunteers on the day of an event depends on the mission of the non-profit partner, but typical examples include sorting charitable contributions, preparing food for disadvantaged members of the community, assisting at fund-raising galas and helping to clean up parks and green spaces. One Brick events usually last 3–4 hours. After each event, the One Brick manager organizes a get-together for the volunteers to socialize. This social aspect is considered a key feature of the One Brick volunteer experience.
