= Staircase of Santa Maria del Monte =

Steps in Caltagirone, Sicily, Italy

Santa Maria del Monte
- Stairway
- {{{other_names}}}
- Scalinata di Santa Maria del Monte (Italian)
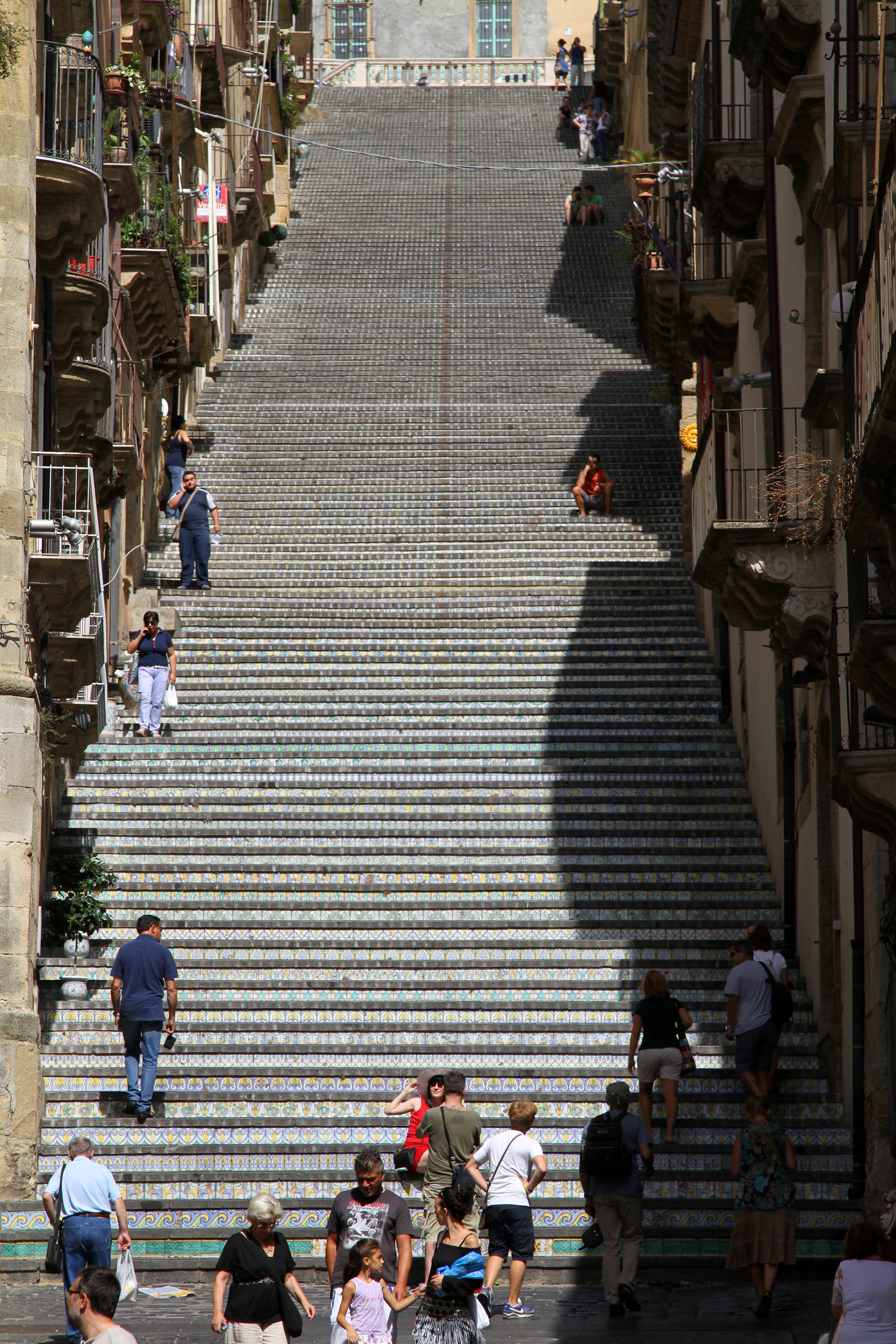
- Staircase of Santa Maria del Monte
- Constructed: 1606
- Steps: 142
- Height: between 40 metres (130 ft) and 50 metres (160 ft)
- Length: 130 metres (430 ft)
- Surface: ceramic tile
- Location: Caltagirone, Italy
- Interactive map of Santa Maria del Monte
- Coordinates: 37°14′20″N 14°30′43″E

Scalinata di Santa Maria del Monte is a set of world-famous steps in Caltagirone, Sicily, Italy. It was built in 1606 in order to connect the ancient part of Caltagirone to the new city built in the upper part. The staircase, over 130 meters (430 ft) long, is flanked by balcony buildings and is today one of the identifying monuments of the city.

The city of Caltagirone is part of Late Baroque Towns of the Val di Noto, a UNESCO World Heritage Site since 2002.

== History ==
In the middle of the 15th century, the city of Caltagirone expanded through the slopes of the mountain. The expansion of the city, on different levels, made communication between the areas of the city difficult.

In order to facilitate access to the old town, located at the top, the city authorities ordered the construction, in 1606, of a staircase along the southern slope of the hill. The work required 10 years of work and was carried out under the direction of Giuseppe Giacalone. The original staircase had rest areas and a total of 150 steps.

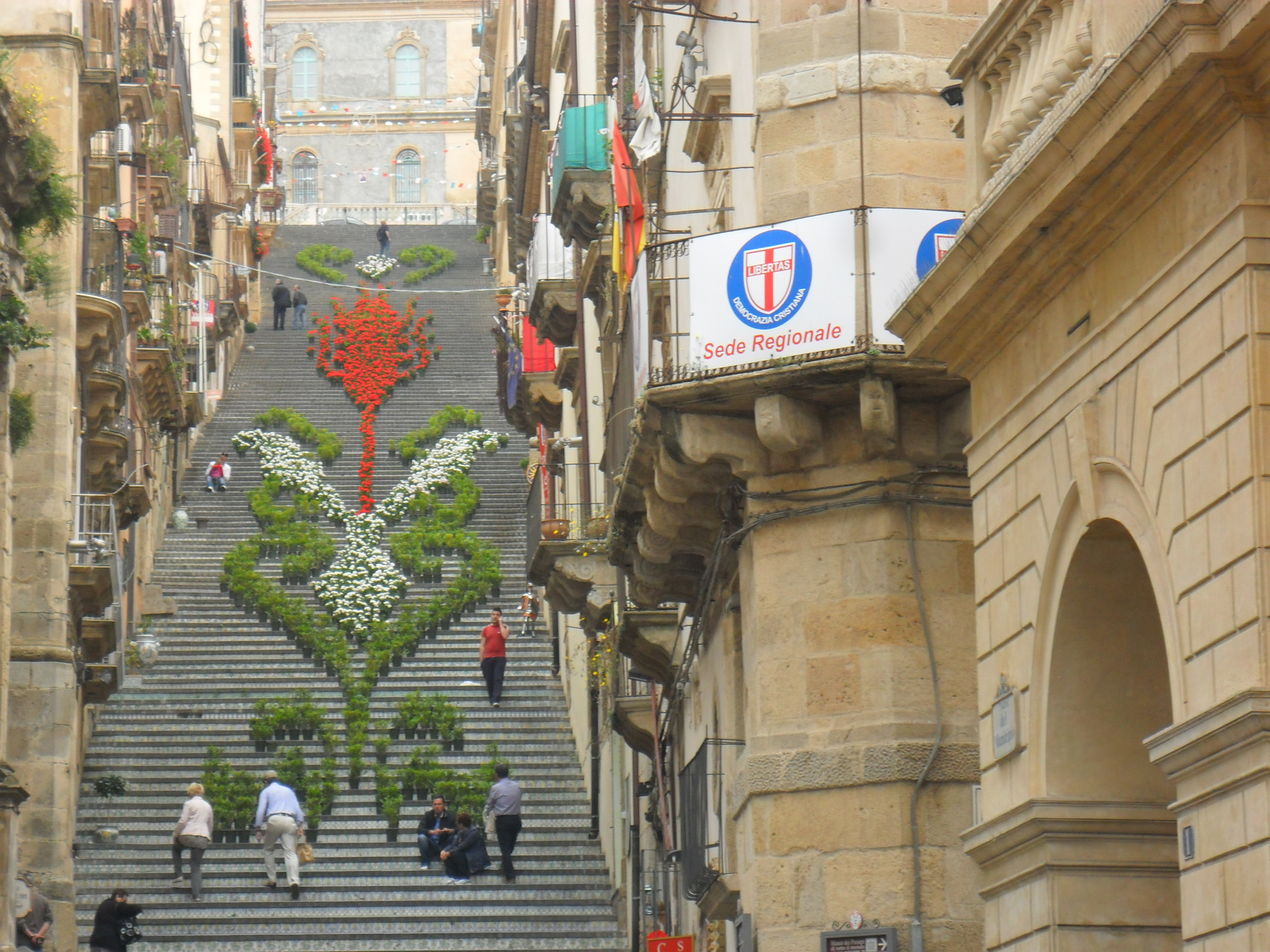
Staircase of Santa Maria del Monte, Caltagirone

In 1844, the staircase underwent modifications, among which the elimination of rest areas stands out, which results in a lower inclination.

== The steps ==
Since 1954, the steps leading to the church of Santa Maria del Monte have been entirely decorated with polychrome ceramic tiles, following the ancient local artisan tradition.

The figurative themes of the ceramics are floral or geometric, and represent the Arab, Norman, Angevin-Aragonese, Spanish, Renaissance, Baroque, eighteenth-century, nineteenth-century and contemporary styles. The designs on the tiles reflect ceramic style progressively from the 9th century to the 19th century, with the oldest style at the bottom of the stairway and the latest at the top.

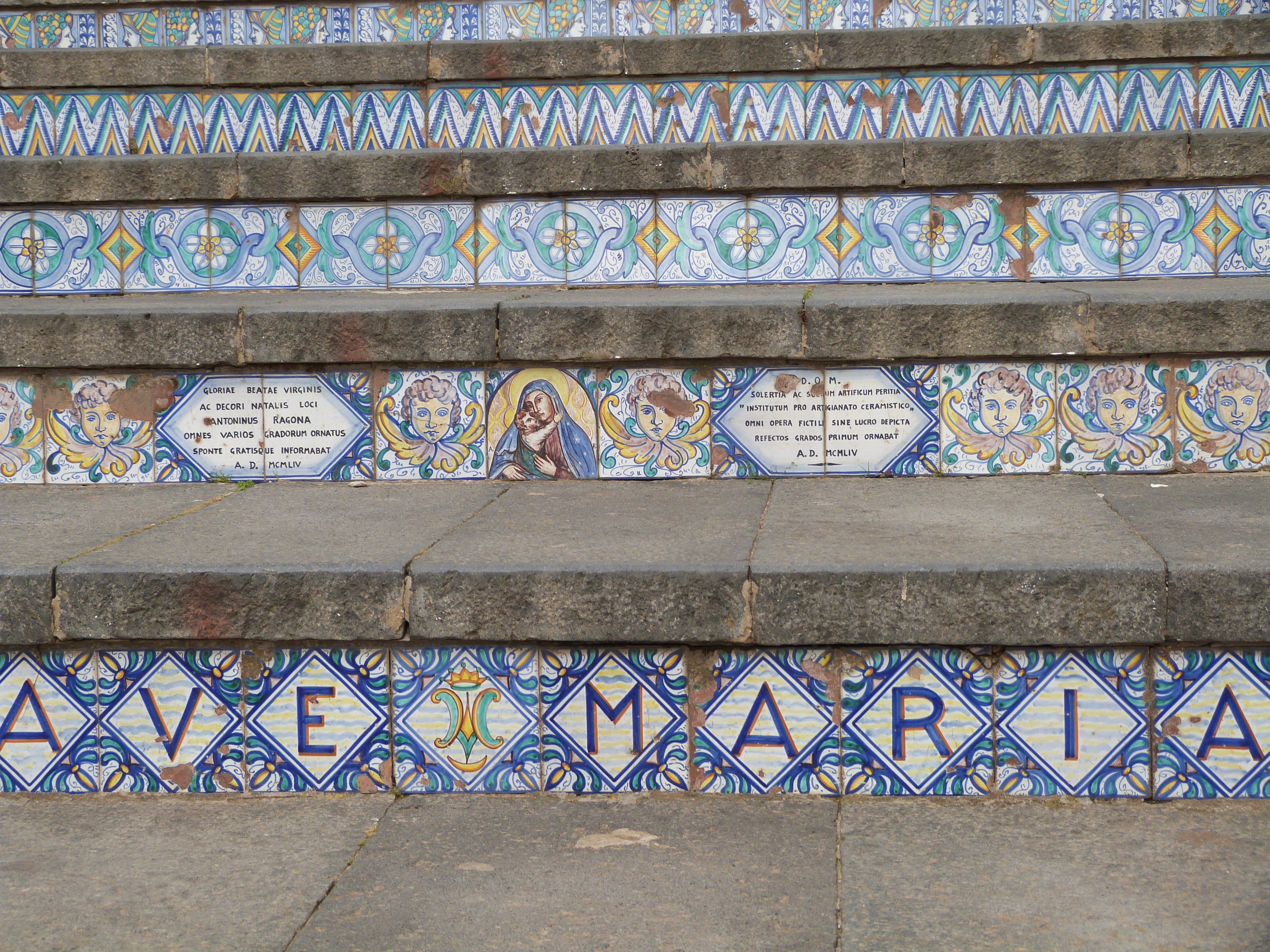
Details of the 103rd step, Santa Maria del Monte

The 103rd step is inscribed with “Ave Maria”, referencing the 103rd Psalm and its themes of benediction, forgiveness, and compassion.

== Festivities ==
=== Infiorata ===
During the month of May, the "Flower Festival" is held, dedicated to the Virgin Mary. Thousands of flowers are used as decorations, along the stairs.

=== La Scala Illuminata ===
Every year, during the days 24 and 25 of July, and 14 and 15 of August, the staircase is illuminated with 4000 oil lamps, in honor of the patron saint of Caltagirone, Saint James the Great. The celebration attracts thousands of tourists.
