= Caltagirone =

Municipality in Sicily, Italy

Caltagirone Cartaggiruni (Sicilian)
- Comune
- Città di Caltagirone
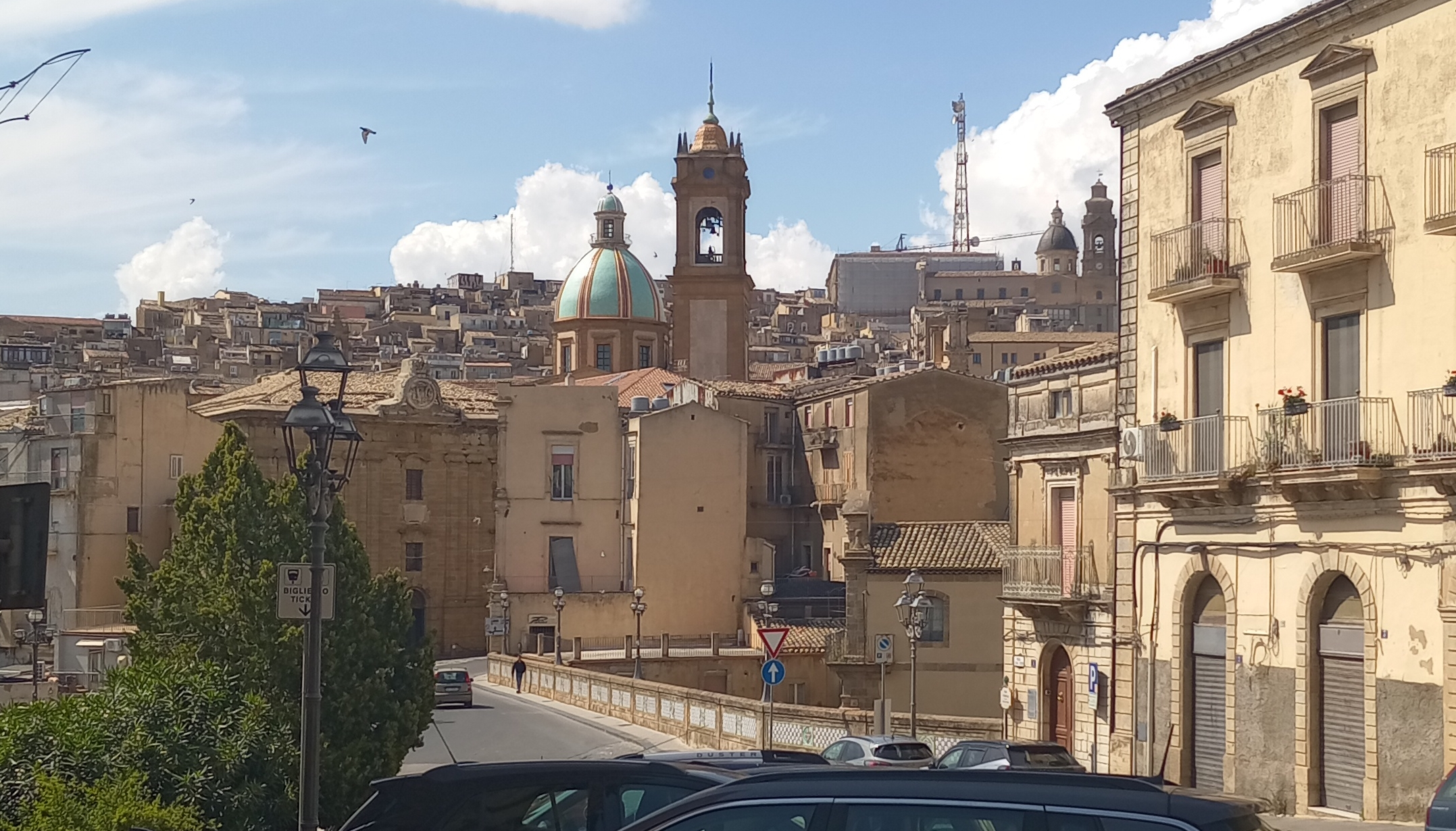

- Coat of arms

- Location within Italy Location within Sicily
- Coordinates: 37°14′15″N 14°30′45″E
- Country: Italy
- Region: Sicily
- Metropolitan city: Catania (CT)
- Frazioni: Albanazzo, Colleggiata (Collegiata), Favarella, Granieri, Mulino Buongiovanni, Piano Carbone, Piano San Paolo, Rangasia, San Basilio – Casa Prete, San Mauro, Santo Pietro, Serra Fornazzo, Signore del Soccorso, Villa Gravina, Villa Grazia

Government
  - Mayor: Fabio Roccuzzo (centre-left coalition)

Area
  - Total: 382 km^{2} (147 sq mi)
- Elevation: 608 m (1,995 ft)

Population (30 June 2017)
  - Total: 38,391
  - Density: 101/km^{2} (260/sq mi)
- Demonym: Calatini or Caltagironesi
- Time zone: UTC+1 (CET)
  - Summer (DST): UTC+2 (CEST)
- Postal code: 95041, 95040
- Dialing code: 0933
- Patron saint: St. James
- Saint day: 25 July
- Website: www.comune.caltagirone.ct.it

UNESCO World Heritage Site
- Part of: Late Baroque Towns of the Val di Noto (South-Eastern Sicily)
- Criteria: Cultural: (i)(ii)(iv)(v)
- Reference: 1024rev-001
- Inscription: 2002 (26th Session)
- Area: 22.9 ha (2,460,000 sq ft)
- Buffer zone: 47.86 ha (5,152,000 sq ft)

Caltagirone (Italian: [kaltadʒiˈroːne]; Sicilian: Cartaggiruni [kaɾtaddʒɪˈɾuːnɪ, katta-] or Caltaggiruni; Latin: Calata Hieronis) is an inland city and municipality (Italian: comune) in the Metropolitan City of Catania, on the island (and region) of Sicily, Southern Italy, about 70 kilometres (43 mi) southwest of Catania.

It is the fifth most populous municipality of the Metropolitan City, behind Catania, Acireale, Misterbianco and Paternò. Alongside Catania, it is the only town that has a tribunal seat in the former province. Since 1987, the comune has enjoyed the City title, through a presidential act. After Caltanissetta, it is the second-most populous comune in Central Sicily.

The town is a production center of pottery, particularly maiolica and terra-cotta wares. Contemporary production is more and more oriented to artistic production of ceramics and terra-cotta sculptures. Other activities are mainly related to agriculture (production of grapes, olives, peaches), third-sector activities, light industry and tourism.

== History ==
The city's name derives from the Arabic qalʿat al-jirār (قلعة الجرار, "castle of [pottery] jars") – a name that attests to the antiquity of the local pottery works and to Arab influence in the area before 1000 CE. Concerning the name etymology, there are other hypotheses, that could refer to the Greek or Genoan past of the town, or also to something concerning the land or the surrounding area.

The area has been inhabited since prehistoric times, as shown by the presence of two necropolises dating from the second millennium BCE, and by numerous other archaeological finds. It was later inhabited by the Sicels, a people who predated Roman occupation and control.

Inside the municipal area, there's the archaeological area of Monte San Mauro, dug by archaeologist Paolo Orsi during the early 20th century, where there was found an inhabited area with a cult area and a necropolis: it would be likely a Leontinoi subcolony, the Chalcidian town of Euboia, despite some scientists think it would be also the case of a Colony under Gela rule, because of the important closure between the archaeological area and the Geloan Fields.

During the Middle Age, Arabs built a castle here; in 1030 it was attacked by Ligurian troops under the Byzantine general George Maniakes. The current town's Sicilian dialect continues to have traces of Ligurian language. The city flourished under the Norman, Hohenstaufen and Aragonese domination, becoming a renowned center for production of ceramics.

The city was almost completely destroyed by the earthquake of 1693. Many public and private buildings were reconstructed in a Sicilian Late-Baroque style. The city has an array of architectural resources and, together with the surrounding territory, is protected by the UNESCO World Heritage program.

During unification struggles, on 29 May 1860, the town was looted by the Bourbon army led by general Gaetano Afan de Rivera; they were fleeing from the Garibaldini forces towards Catania.

During the first part of the 20th century, the town was a stronghold of Italian Christian democracy movement, due to the presence of renowned politician Luigi Sturzo, Italian People's Party founder. Later, the town produced such nationwide politicians as Italian Prime minister Mario Scelba, and Sicilian president Silvio Milazzo.

Before and after this period, Caltagirone saw the building of many monuments in Art Nouveau style: some examples are the Saint Julian church portal, the Officine Elettriche (it could be translated as Electrical Factories), some nobles' palaces (for example Palazzo della Magnolia) and the Vittorio Emanuele's Post office.

As part of Operation Husky (9–10 July 1943), the town was bombed by Allied air forces. The attacks resulted in hundreds of civilian casualties and led to the destruction of several buildings of historical significance.

During the World War II, the town was one of the earliest Operation Husky checkpoints, in which there were all of the three Ally contingents (US, Canada and UK). Also, it was the final theatre of the Indepentist season, specifically the area of San Mauro; there, the Royal Carabinieri and the Concetto Gallo-ruled EVIS had a battle, won by the Italian army.

The hamlet (Italian: frazione) of Santo Pietro became the site of the so-called Biscari Massacre on 14 July 1943. At Airfield 504 in Santo Pietro, soldiers of the United States Army committed a war crime by executing 74 Italians and 2 German prisoners of war.

After this period, the town experienced, during the rest of the 20th century, some oscillations concerning overall population, remaining between 36,000 and 39,000 inhabitants; meanwhile, the town dramatically sprawled, increasing its urban area, and developing its own suburban area, that has both suburban features and countryside ones.

Today, Caltagirone is a mid-tier Sicilian town. It is one of the 25 most populous towns in Sicily, and one of the 250 most populous in Italy.

== Geography ==
The municipality borders with Acate (RG), Gela (CL), Grammichele, Licodia Eubea, Mazzarino (CL), Mazzarrone, Mineo, Mirabella Imbaccari, Niscemi (CL), Piazza Armerina (EN) and San Michele di Ganzaria.

Its hamlets (frazioni) are Albanazzo, Colleggiata (or Collegiata), Favarella, Granieri, Mulino Buongiovanni, Piano Carbone, Piano San Paolo, Rangasia, San Basilio – Casa Prete, San Mauro, Santo Pietro, Serra Fornazzo, Signore del Soccorso, Villa Gravina and Villa Grazia.

== Main sights ==
A collection of ancient and modern pottery and terra-cotta, dating to the Magna Grecia period, is shown in the local Museum of Pottery. The museum was created in 1965.

The main landmark of the city is the 142-step monumental Staircase of Santa Maria del Monte, built from 1608 in the old part of the town. Each step is decorated with different hand-decorated ceramics, using styles and figures derived from the city's millennial tradition of pottery making. Once a year, on and around the day of the city's patron saint, (St. James, 25 July), the staircase is illuminated with candles of different colours. They are arranged to create an artistic display of several tens of meters.

Religious buildings include:

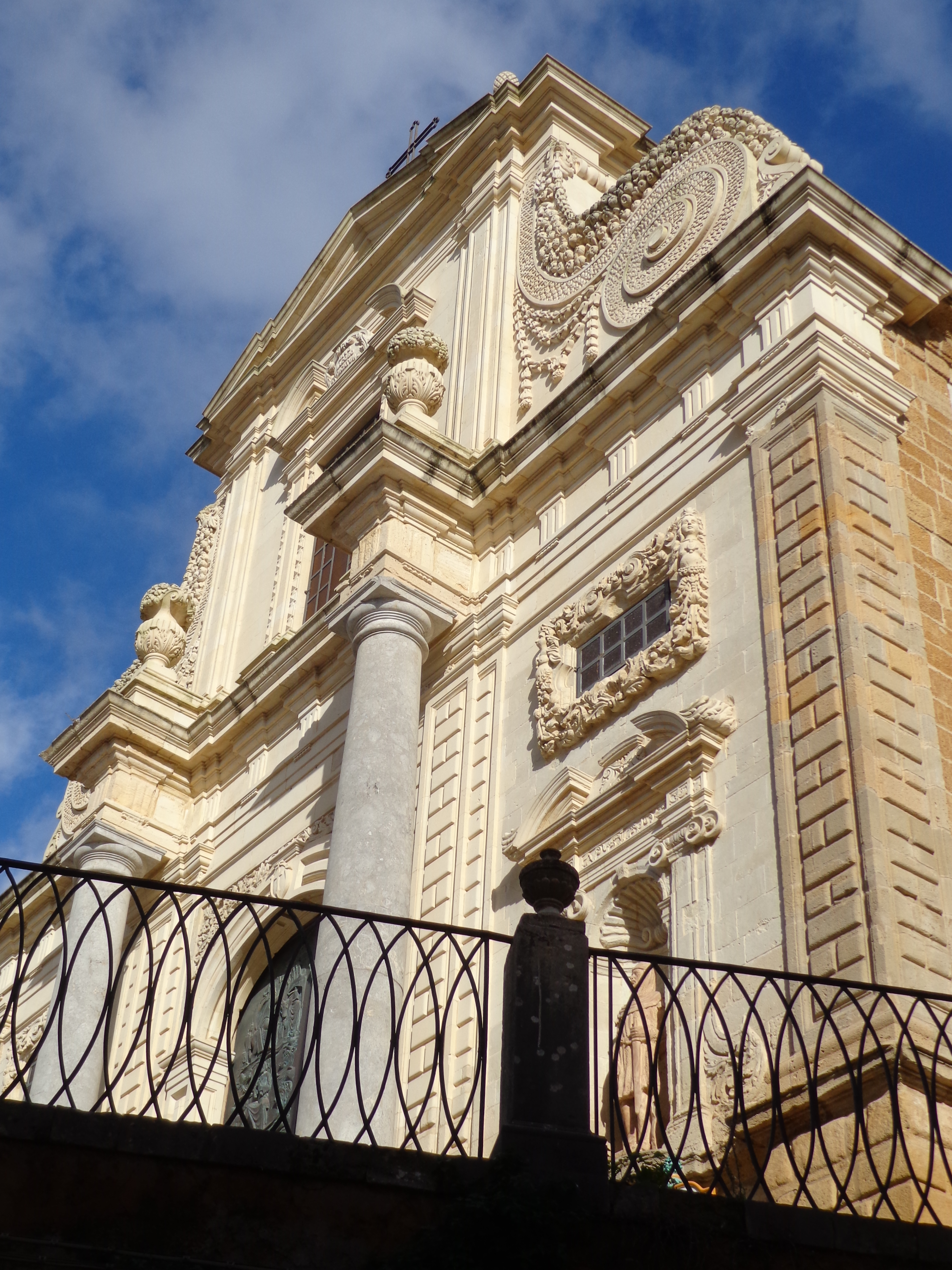
Saint James church

- San Giuliano (Saint Julian): Cathedral of Norman origin, rebuilt after the 1693 earthquake, dedicated to St Julian, with a twentieth-century Art Nouveau façade by Saverio Gulli.
- San Francesco di Paola (Saint Francis of Paola): Baroque church; the sacristy is in Gothic style, dating from before the 1693 earthquake.
- San Francesco all'Immacolata (Saint Francis to the Immaculate): Church dedicated to St Francis of Assisi, built originally in 1236 and rebuilt in Baroque style after 1693. The façade has two orders with marine symbols and a statue of the Immaculate (Virgin Mary). The dome is unfinished.
- Chiesa del Gesù (Church of Jesus): Church of Jesus, built by Jesuits. (1570). The façade has eight statues portraying saints and the Madonna with Child. The interior, one a single nave, houses a Pietà by Filippo Paladino (1607) and Christ's Nativity by painter Polidoro da Caravaggio.
- Santa Maria di Gesù (Saint Mary of Jesus): adjacent to Franciscan convent, with Madonna statue by Gagini
- Santa Maria del Monte (12th century).
- The Renaissance Church of the New Capuchins, in white stone, with a noteworthy treasure and a picture gallery.
- San Giacomo (Saint James)
- San Giorgio (Saint George) – church contains an altarpiece attributed to Rogier van der Weyden
- Also noteworthy is the Palazzo Senatorio (15th century), the former Town Hall.

== Notable people ==
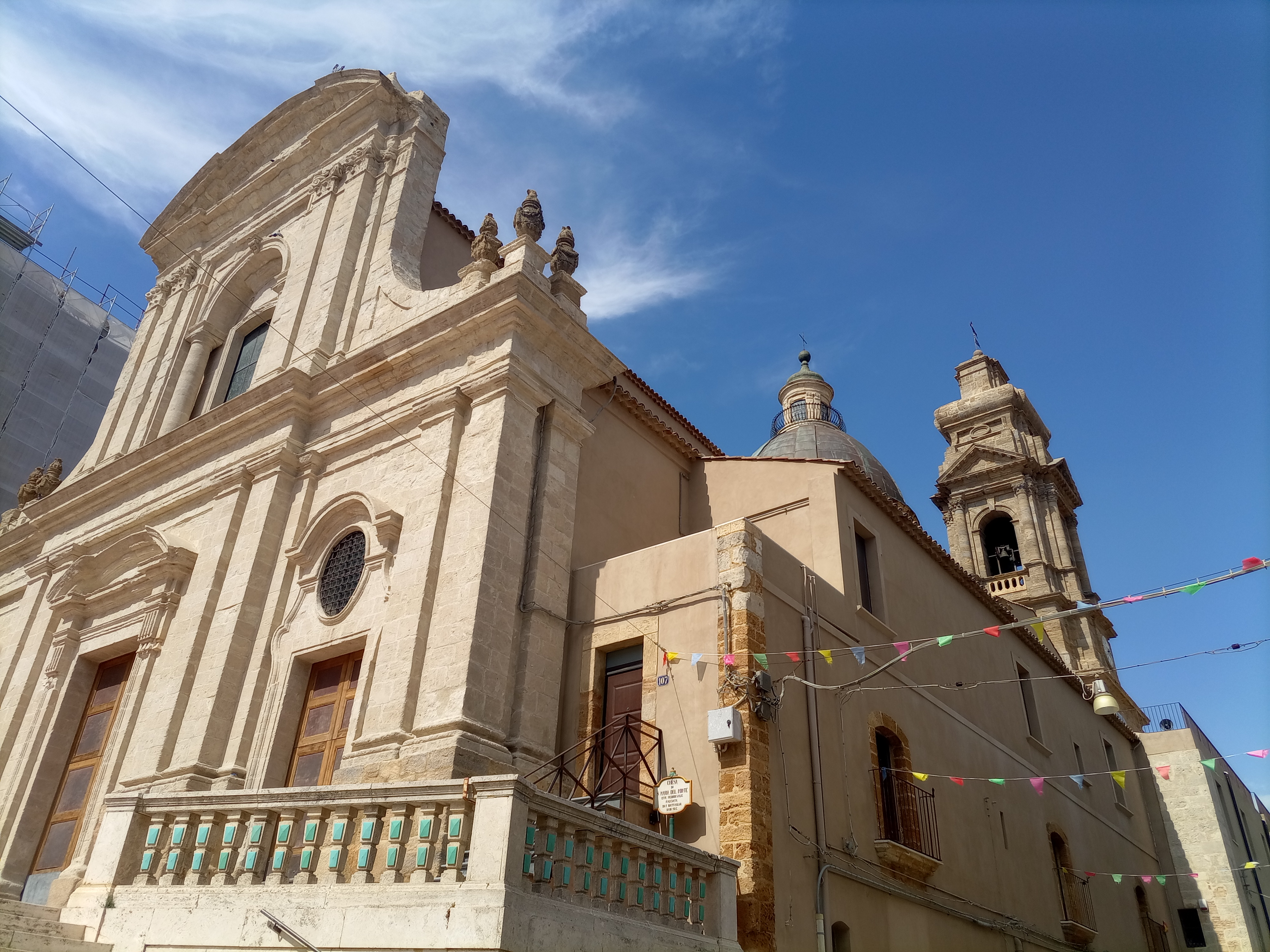
Santissima Maria del Monte Church, one of the anciest all over the town

- Don Luigi Sturzo (1871–1959), founder of the Italian People's Party (Italian: Partito Popolare Italiano, later Democrazia Cristiana). He is one of the most important Italian statesman and politician since the creation of the unitary State.
- Mario Scelba (1901–1991), Minister of the Interior and Prime Minister of Italy from February 1954 to July 1955.
- Silvio Milazzo (1903–1982), President of the Regional Government of Sicily in 1958–1960.
- Giuseppe Mascara (1979–), football player, born here in 1979. During his career, he played in Serie A, Italian national team and UEFA Champions League.
- Nicolò Longobardo (1565–1654), Jesuit, Superior General of Chinese Mission after Matteo Ricci;
- Agesilao Greco (1866–1963), fencer, theorician of the said sport.
- Paolo Ciulla (1867–1931), currency forger.
- Giuseppe Marcinò (1589–1655), priest, Capuchins leader and Venerable by the Catholic Church.

== Sister cities ==
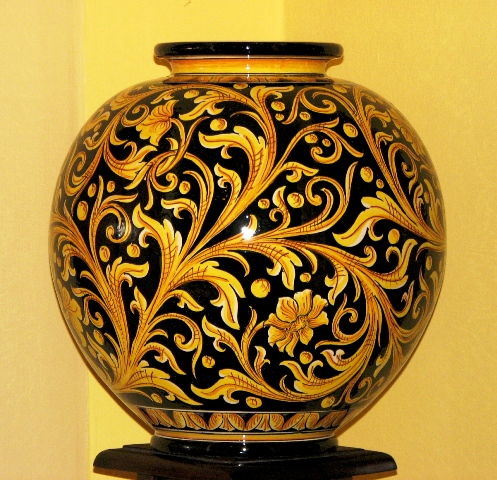
Modern Caltagirone ceramic vase, with Greek-ish color scheme

Caltagirone, during the latest decades, built some partnerships and sisterhoods with certain cities around the world, for cultural, social and historical reasons and purposes. Currently, the town has the following ones:

- Mdina, Malta
- (United States) San Francisco, USA (California)
- Arnsberg, Germany (Nordrhein-Westfalen)
- Bethlehem, Palestine
- Kallikrateia, Greece
- Abbadia Larana, Italy (Lombardy)

== See also ==
- Sant'Ippolito (hill)
- Diocese of Caltagirone
- Caltagirone Ceramics
