= 18th-century Western domes =

Aspect of architectural history

Domes built in the 18th century by the Western world, broadly defined, benefited from the newly developed mathematics of calculus and the study of statics. There were numerous studies on the catenary curve as the most stable form for arches and vaults and the ideal shape for a dome was debated in the late 18th century. Calculus allowed Guarini's experimental designs with intersections of spheres, barrel vaults, and oval domes to be proven and they would become the foundation of Rococo spatial arrangements.

In the areas of the Holy Roman Empire, rebuilding of the many palaces and churches destroyed in the Thirty Years' War had begun by the end of the seventeenth century. Ovals resolved the tension between longitudinal and centralized spaces in German Baroque architecture, but resting them on drums created problems and so the domes often rested directly on arches or pendentives. Bulbous domes were popular in central and southern Germany and in Austria in the 18th century, and influenced those in Poland and Eastern Europe in the Baroque period. However, many bulbous domes in the larger cities of Eastern Europe were replaced during the second half of the eighteenth century in favor of hemispherical or stilted cupolas in the French or Italian styles.

Domes in Mexico were single shell constructions, with few exceptions, and the domes and lanterns were commonly covered with glazed tiles. A wooden structure supporting a layer of earth fill to support the domes during construction, a technique used in Europe to build domes since the Romanesque era.

Although never very popular in domestic settings, domes were used in a number of 18th century homes built in the Neoclassical style. In the United States, small cupolas were used to distinguish public buildings from private residences. After a domed design was chosen for the national capitol, several states added prominent domes to their assembly buildings.

== Developments ==
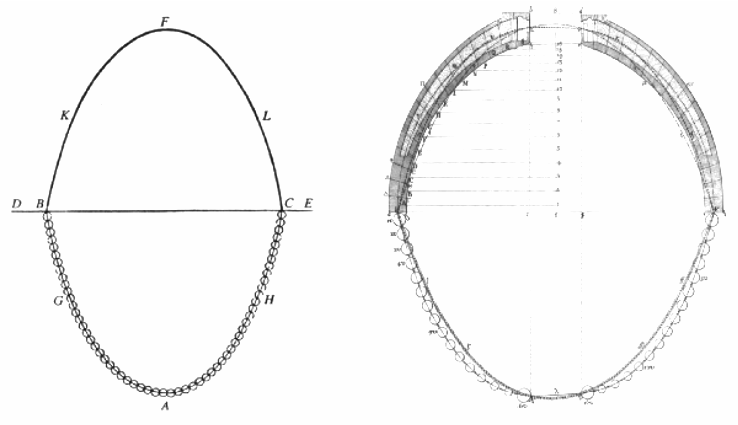
Drawing by Giovanni Poleni of catenary curves and the dome profile of St. Peter's Basilica

Over the course of the eighteenth century, developments in mathematics and the study of statics led to a more precise formalization of the ideas of the traditional constructive practices of arches and vaults, and there was a diffusion of studies on what was considered the most stable form for these structures: the catenary curve. Robert Hooke had published a Latin anagram in 1675 indicating that the perfect shape for an arch to resist a given load was the inversion of the shape a flexible cord assumes under such a load, but he was unable to define this catenary curve mathematically and the anagram was deciphered only after his death. In 1704, James Bernoulli wrote that an inverted catenary arch of any thickness will resist its own weight, which likely inspired Pierre Bouguer to conclude in his Mémoire sur le lignes courbes qui sont propres à former les voûtes en dômes (1734) that the optimal dome shape was a rotated inverted semi-catenary. Giovanni Poleni, tasked by the Pope in 1743 to study the stability of the dome of St. Peter's Basilica, built scale models to demonstrate that a catenary curve can be found to fit between the two shells of the dome and published drawings in 1748, "the very first example of conscious and documented use of catenary in Architecture".

The treatise by Guarino Guarini, published posthumously in 1737, included the way to draw various vaults, but not how to build them. Building on Fontana's work, Bernardo Antonio Vittone published Istruzioni elementari dell’architettura civile in 1760, in which he recommended using ogival or ellipsoidal profiles to increase the proportional height of domes and increasing the angle at which they intersected with their lanterns, for both structural and aesthetic reasons. To counter the negative impact this raised profile has on the interior appearance, domes with two or three layers of vaults were built, with openings in the lower levels to admit light.

Analytical approaches were also being developed and debated in the eighteenth century, particularly between French and Italian mathematicians and architects, but were considered too theoretical to be used in construction. The study of dome structures changed radically, with domes being considered as a composition of smaller elements, each subject to mathematical and mechanical laws and easier to analyze individually, rather than being considered as whole units unto themselves. In 1734, mathematician Pierre Bouguer (and later others) argued that the dome could be thought of as sliced into a series of independent wedged-shaped segments meeting as arches. Therefore, a dome as a whole was stable if each constituent arch was stable and analysis of a dome could be performed the same way as analysis of an arch. He published his Mémoire in 1736, "the first treatise on the theory of the dome", with possible stable forms for domes when ignoring friction. A. F. Frézier built on this work and used a method of analyzing the thrust of domes as made of a series of masonry arch elements that could then be compared to the known thrust behavior of barrel vaults of the same span. The arch-slices approach was applied in 1743 by the three mathematicians hired to advise on the stability of the cracking dome of St. Peter's Basilica: François Jacquier, Thomas Le Seur, and Roger Joseph Boscovich. It would subsequently become the standard approach to dome analysis. Their use of a simplified mathematical model of the dome's structure to calculate the strength an additional chain would need to ensure the safety of the dome was an unprecedented step, although they did not provide enough detail of the calculations or the assumptions of their model for their result to be independently verified. A 1773 study by Charles-Augustin de Coulomb focused on the verification of static equilibrium in masonry structures and took friction into account.

In the late eighteenth century, the ideal shape for a dome was debated by Charles Bossut, Lorenzo Mascheroni, Giuseppe Venturoli, and Leonardo Salimbeni, among others. The approach of Bossut (1776), Salimbeni (1787), and Bérard (1810) combined the frictionless model of Bouguer with the arch-slicing technique of Frézier in purely mathematical research that was never applied to the design of actual domes.

== Kingdom of France ==
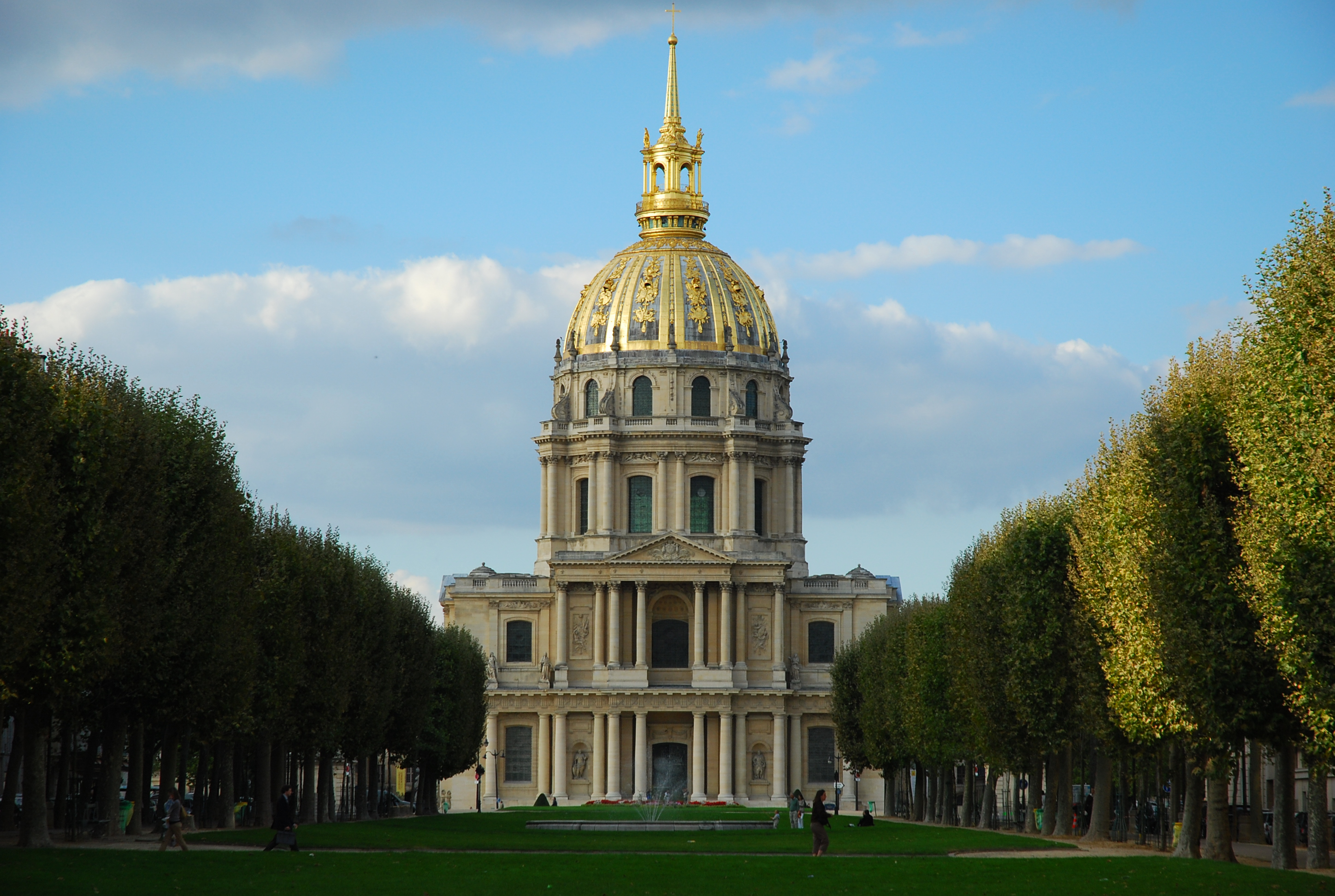
Les Invalides in Paris

Adjacent to a hospital and retirement home for injured war veterans, the royal chapel of Les Invalides in Paris, France, was begun in 1679 and completed in 1708. The dome was one of many inspired by that of St. Peter's Basilica and it is an outstanding example of French Baroque architecture. In 1861 the body of Napoleon Bonaparte was moved from St. Helena to the most prominent location under the dome.

The dome of Val-de-Grâce in Paris (1645–1710) was designed by Jacques Lemercier after having worked in Rome for seven years. It includes an inscription around the dome relating to the Bourbon kings. Inspired by St. Peter's Basilica, its dome likewise has two shells, but the outer shell is much taller in order to compensate for the foreshortening effect from viewing the exterior dome from nearby on the ground. The inner shell is made of stone and the outer shell is made of wood.

Plans for the Church of St. Genevieve, the patron saint of Paris, were approved in 1757 with a dome 84 metres (275 ft) tall over a Greek cross plan. The architect of the church, Jacques-Germain Soufflot, wanted to surpass the dome of London's St. Paul's Cathedral and, like St. Paul's, the dome consisted of three shells. Unlike St. Paul's, and due to advances in mathematics and engineering, all three shells were built of stone and made a part of a structural system that permitted support by thinner piers and walls. Finished in 1790 by Jean-Baptiste Rondelet, the outward thrust of the domes were restrained by the use of metal rings but issues with the supporting pillars required Napoleon to have Rondelet strengthen the pillars in 1806. Later named the Panthéon, the crossing dome of the building has a span of 20 metres (65 ft) and 8 inches and a height of 14 metres (47 ft). Two "pre-tensioned high resistance cables" were added to the dome in the early 21st century.

The Halle aux blés, a corn exchange in Paris, was a rotunda was built from 1763 to 1766 by Nicolas Le Camus de Mézières with a central circular courtyard 37 metres (120 ft) wide. The courtyard was covered with a laminated timber and glass dome built from 1782 to 1783 by André Jacob Roubo, to the designs of Jacques-Guillaume Legrand and Jacques Molinos. It used the structural system published by Philibert de l'Orme in his 1561 treatise, with short sections of curved wood sandwiched together with staggered joints and held together with wooden pegs to form longer curved vertical beams braced horizontally by wooden purlins, which avoided the need for centering. The building became a popular sight in Paris and was seen and admired by Thomas Jefferson, who later used the same structural system for the small dome he added to his Monticello home. The 1783 dome burned down in 1803 and was replaced from 1808 to 1813 with an iron and glass dome designed by François-Joseph Bélanger.

== Kingdom of Great Britain ==
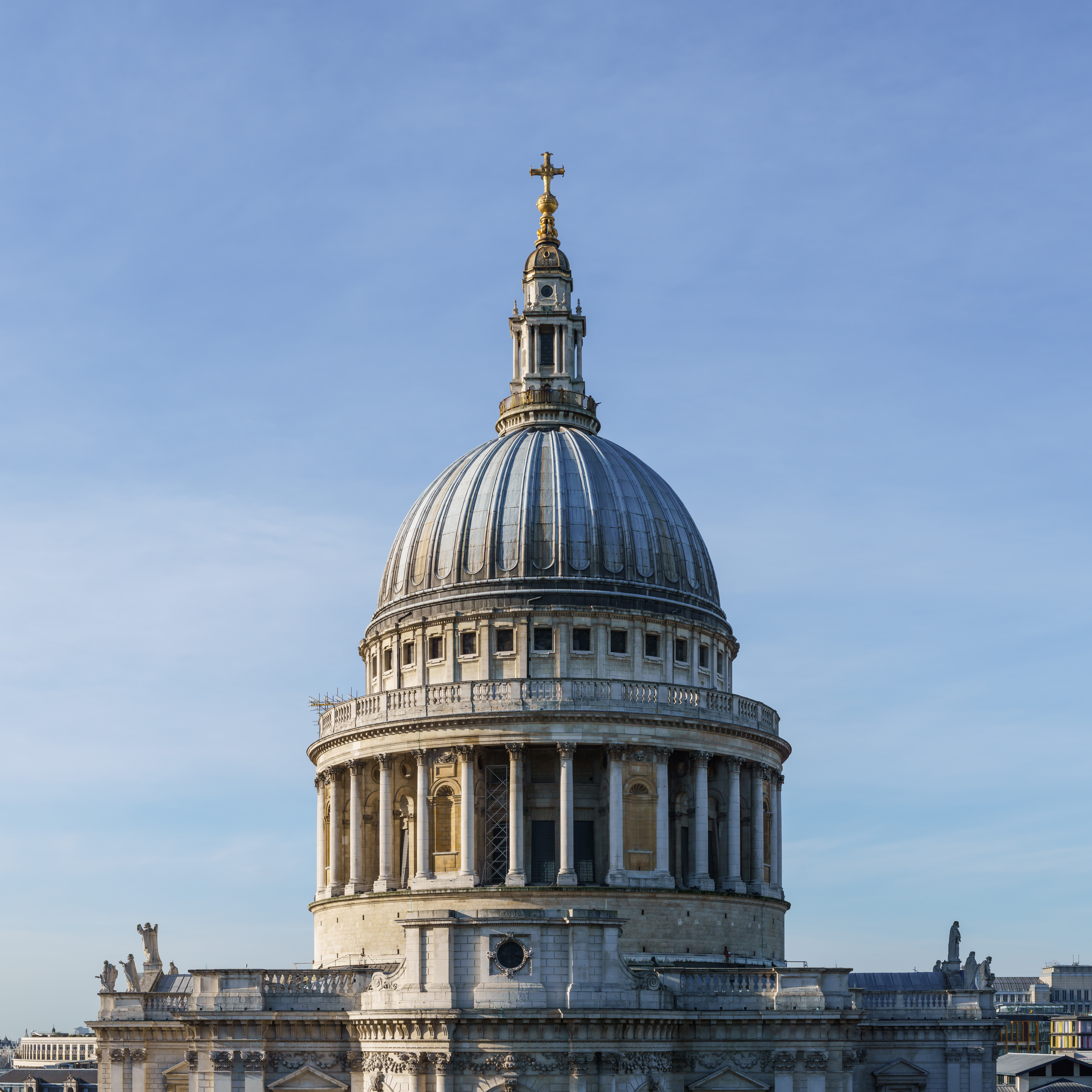
St. Paul's Cathedral in London

London's Great Fire of 1666, following a devastating outbreak of plague in the city that killed a fifth of its population, spurred the commission of Christopher Wren to rebuild St. Paul's Cathedral, which occurred over the course of 35 years. Robert Hooke, who first articulated that a thin arch was comparable to an inverted hanging chain, may have advised Wren on how to achieve the crossing dome. Wren may also have been informed of the structural problems of the dome of St. Peter's Basilica by John Evelyn, who had examined it, and did not finalize his design for a dome three-quarters its size until shortly before its construction started in 1705.

When finished, the dome had three layers: an inner dome with an oculus, a decorative outer wooden dome covered in lead roofing, and a structural brick cone in between. The brick cone ends in a small dome that supports the cupola and outer roof and the decorated underside of which can be seen through the inner dome's oculus. The structure rises 111 metres (365 ft) to the cross at its summit, but is evocative of the much smaller Tempietto by Bramante. The use of the brick cone, in addition to other innovations, allowed the piers beneath the dome to be reduced in size. The thickness of the brick cone is 450 millimeters. The inside wall of the drum supporting the inner dome slopes inwards to the base of the dome for structural reasons, a design feature seen in the 1672 model and apparently inspired by Robert Hooke's ideas on arch shape, and three encircling chains were used to resist horizontal thrust. The dome is supported by eight piers with a veneer of Portland stone over a core of rubble infill, which were damaged by the added pressure from the dome's construction and needed repairs in 1709. The dome was completed in 1710. The inner side of the dome was painted by James Thornhill from 1715 to 1717 with eight scenes of St. Paul from the Acts of the Apostles in a brown stone-like color mandated by the presiding committee. Wren's structural system became the standard for large domes well into the 19th century. The iron chains used to encircle the 34-meter-wide dome have since been replaced by stainless steel girdles. Damage to the outer timber truss dome during World War II resulted in the timber being replaced by reinforced concrete.

Although never very popular in domestic settings, domes were used in a number of 18th century homes built in the Neo-Classical style, including the 1720s Chiswick House, in West London. The Palladian mansion Penicuik House, built by Sir James Clerk, included a stable block with a domed dovecote built as a faithful imitation of the destroyed ancient monument Arthur's O'on. A chapel at Gibside by James Paine has a trefoil plan with a central dome. The domed mausoleum by Nicholas Hawksmoor at Castle Howard was built in 1742 and is similar to Bramante's Tempietto. Robert Adam referenced the Roman Pantheon dome in his 1767 design of Luton Hoo in Bedfordshire.

The Pantheon on London's Oxford Street was designed by James Wyatt in 1770, becoming a fashionable meeting-place for the aristocracy. Its dome was inspired by the dome of the Roman Pantheon but was destroyed in a fire in 1792.

Domes in English Neoclassical churches are often not visible on the exterior, but were used over octagonal, square, cruciform, and longitudinal plans. The recommendation of octagonal plans as the ideal church shape for preaching by the Methodist Conference of 1770 may explain the popularity of octagon plans, such as the domed octagons of Octagon Chapel in Bath (1767) and Surrey Chapel in Southwark (1782–1783).

St Mary's Chapel in East Lulworth (1786–1787), a Roman Catholic chapel only permitted by King George III to be built if it did not appear to be a church on the exterior, has a plain exterior but uses a quatrefoil plan with a central dome on pendentives.

Shallow domes were used over the alters of some churches, such as John Soane's remodeling of Wardour Chapel in Wiltshire (1788–1790). St Mary on Paddington Green Church (1788–1791) has a shallow interior dome on pendentives at the center of its cruciform plan.

St James' Church in Great Packington (1789–1792), a Greek Cross plan with filled corners, has domes over the corner towers.

St Mary's Church in Banbury (1790–1797) is similar to Wren's earlier St. Stephen Wolbrook design, with a dome on columns.

== Kingdom of Ireland ==
The Irish Parliament House in Dublin, designed by Edward Lovett Pearce and built from 1729 to 1739, included an octagonal dome over a central chamber for the House of Commons. The location of the space, especially relative to the barrel-vaulted House of Lords, which was off axis on the east side of the building, seemed to symbolize a political dominance by the House of Commons. The dome's outer shell was 9.4 metres (31 ft) above its inner shell and reminiscent of the Roman Pantheon and the octagonal dome over Lord Burlington's Chiswick House. The dome was the only exterior indication of the interior arrangement, but its location and height were such that it could not be easily seen. It was rebuilt after a fire in 1792 but demolished after the building was sold to the Bank of Ireland in 1803.

Thomas Cooley designed the Royal Exchange in Dublin with a central rotunda. Built from 1769 to 1779 in the Neoclassical style, the Pantheon-inspired dome is low on the exterior behind axial porticos. On the interior, the coffered dome is 14 metres (46 ft) in diameter, with twelve circular windows at its base and an oculus at the top.

Assuming responsibility from the deceased Thomas Cooley, architect James Gandon built the Custom House (beginning in 1781), and the Four Courts building (assuming responsibility in 1784) along the River Liffey in Dublin, with prominent central domes. His King's Inns building (1795–1800) was delayed due to his having to leave the country during the Irish Rebellion of 1798.

== Hapsburg Monarchy and the Holy Roman Empire ==
=== Holy Roman Empire ===
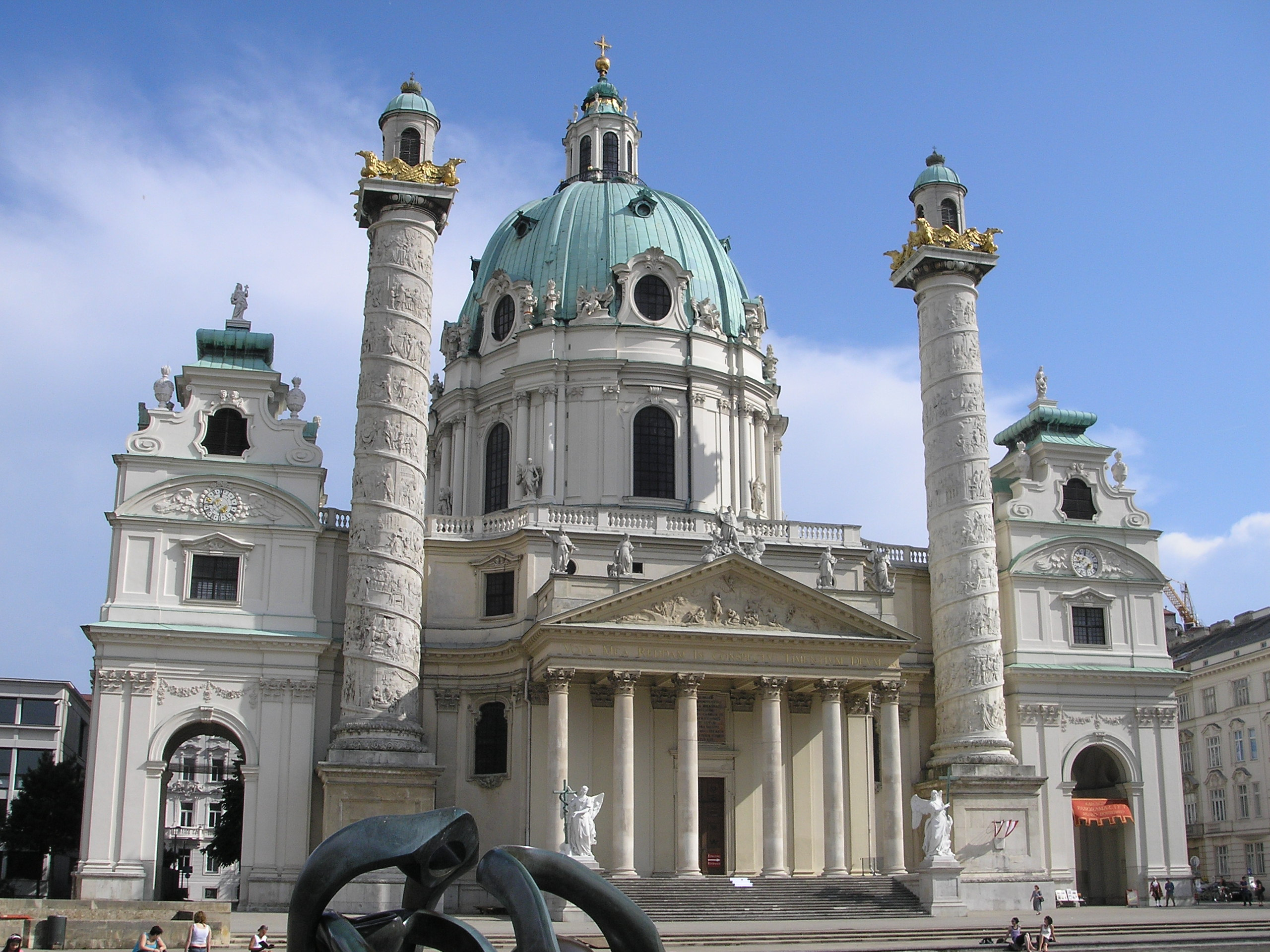
Karlskirche, Vienna

Although the Thirty Years' War delayed the onset of the Baroque style in the areas of the Holy Roman Empire, rebuilding of the many palaces and churches destroyed had begun by the end of the seventeenth century.

==== Prince-Archbishopric of Salzburg ====
Johann Bernhard Fischer von Erlach studied architecture in Rome before working in Austria. His Church of the Holy Trinity (begun 1694) in Salzburg has clear influences from Borromini in its use of the color white, accentuated windows, and the elliptical dome and oculus.

==== Kingdom of Bohemia ====
Guarini's plan for the church of S. Maria Ettinga in Prague inspired a group of buildings built in Bohemia between 1698 and 1710. An abbey church at Obořiště, Bohemia, with two transverse oval vaults in the nave intersecting a third circular dome made to look like an oval, was the first church by Christoph Dientzenhofer to show Guarini's influence. His vaulting system of two transverse oval vaults that do not overlap at the Church of Svatá Klará in Cheb was elaborated two years later in the great abbey church at Banz (1710–18).

In Bohemia and Moravia, Jan Santini Aichel blended styles in what has become known as baroque Gothic, as can be seen in his crossing dome at the Benedictine Monastery at Kladruby (1712–26) and the five-lobed dome of the Chapel of St. Jan Nepomuk (1719–22). More conventionally baroque is his dome at St. Peter and Paul Benedictine Monastery in Rajhrad (1722–24).

==== Prince-Bishopric of Bamberg ====
Banz Abbey, overseen by Johann Dientzenhofer, has a complex arrangement of overlapping and subdivided transverse oval vaults with wide ribs at their intersections that make it difficult to understand the structural system, like Guarini's earlier church of Santa Maria della Divina Providenza in Lisbon.

Neumann's more traditional longitudinal churches had domes over their crossings, such as his church at Gössweinstein (1730–39). Considered Neumann's masterpiece, the Basilica of the Fourteen Holy Helpers (1743–72) uses a system of intersecting ovals similar to that at Banz Abbey. Unlike Banz, the bands at the intersection of the vaults are modeled in stucco, rather than being structural. The stone and mortar shells of the domed vaulting are reinforced by iron bars, a technique he also used in the 18-meter-span (59 ft) domed vault covering the staircase at the Würzburg Residence. It was built in a rural area of Bavaria as a pilgrimage church, as was the Wieskirche, and both in the rococo style.

==== Electorate of Bavaria ====
Hans Georg Asam, father of the Asam brothers C.D. and E.Q. Asam, painted the fresco on the crossing domical vault of the church of Tegernsee Abbey. The crossing dome of Maria Hilf pilgrimage church in Freystadt was built free-standing, surrounded by four towers. The interior includes frescos by H. G. Asam between the four windows. The first dome painting by C.D. Asam is over its crossing of the Ensdorf Abbey church, signed 1714. The dome of Trinity Church in Munich (1711–1714) was also painted by C.D. Asam and the painting fills the whole space between the four windows.

Domes by the Asam brothers, such as that of Weltenburg Abbey (1716–21), blended fresco painting, stucco and indirect lighting to achieve their effects. At Weltenburg, the perspective painting is intended to be viewed from the entrance and also depicts a round drum supporting a higher ribbed and coffered dome.

The Rohr Monastery Church (1717–1720) has a crossing dome in the form of a frescoed handkerchief vault. The tower dome was added in 1739.

An oval resolved the tension between longitudinal and centralized spaces in the dome of Johann Michael Fischer's rotunda at Murnau (1725–27). Oval domes can also be found in the Amalienburg pavilion at Schloss Nymphenburg, Munich.

Neumann's more traditional longitudinal churches had domes over their crossings, such as his church at Münsterschwarzach Abbey (1727–43). Neumann replaced barrel vaults in basilical plan churches with series of light intersecting elliptical domes.

Johann Michael Fischer's abbey church at Rott am Inn (1759–63) has a series of three domical vaults over its nave, with the largest in the center over an octagonal space and painted with an illusionistic fresco by Matthias Günther.

==== Duchy of Württemberg ====
Domes by the Asam brothers, such as that of Weingarten Abbey (1715–20), blended fresco painting and stucco to achieve their effects. At Weingarten, the perspective painting on the east bay handkerchief vault simulates a higher dome and drum.

The Hofkappele of Ludwigsburg Palace (1715–1718), originally intended for Lutheran use, has quadratura painting by Carlo Carlone on the four pendentives and dome.

==== Prince-Bishopric of Augsburg ====
The monastery church of St. Mang's Abbey (1701–1717) by Johann Jakob Herkomer includes a thin timber dome similar to those in Venice, where the architect was trained.

Unlike the Asam brothers, the Zimmerman brothers, Johann Baptist Zimmermann and Dominikus Zimmermann of Bavaria, emphasized white stuccowork under direct lighting blended with fresco painting at Wieskirche at Weis (1745–54).

Neumann's more traditional longitudinal churches had domes over their crossings, such as his church at Neresheim Abbey (1745–92).

==== Imperial Abbey of Schussenried ====
Unlike the Asam brothers, the Zimmerman brothers, Johann Baptist Zimmermann and Dominikus Zimmermann of Bavaria, emphasized white stuccowork under direct lighting blended with fresco painting at St. Peter and Paul Church at Steinhausen (1728–31).

An oval resolved the tension between longitudinal and centralized spaces in the dome of Dominikus Zimmermann's church at Steinhausen (1727–33).

==== Duchy of Savoy ====
The church of Saint Maria delle Grazie (formerly Saint Caterina) in Casale Monferrato was built by Giovanni Battista Scapitta and Giacomo Zanetti with an oval dome 15 meters by 10 meters, on a 7-meter-tall (23 ft) drum. It was built in 8 years and finished in 1726.

Appointed by the King of Savoy as First Architect to the King in 1714, Filippo Juvarra built the Basilica of Superga at Turin between 1717 and 1731. The apparent lightness of its dome may be attributed to both even lighting and the unusual lack of pendentives, with the dome on its circular entablature above eight columns instead. Its use of bulbous domes on the lantern and side towers was also unusual in Italy, where bulbous domes remained rare. The basilica was built as the official dynastic mausoleum of the House of Savoy, which had governed Piedmont and southeast France since the 15th century. The original intended site of the mausoleum, begun in 1596, was found to have problems with uneven settlement due to the soil and this led to a halt in construction. After efforts to compensate for the settlement, and despite the mausoleum at Superga already being built, construction was resumed to complete the original building as the Sanctuary of Vicoforte.

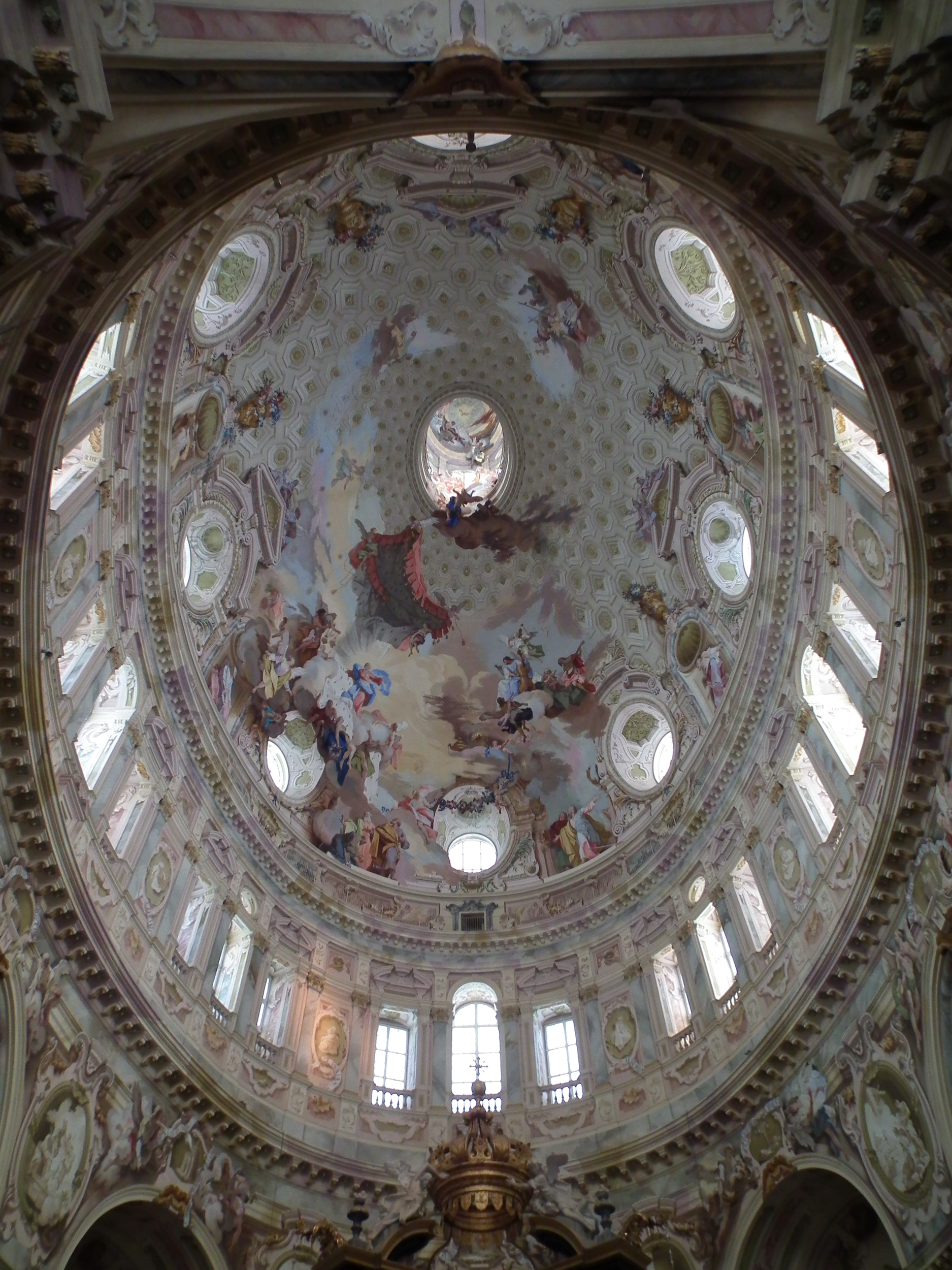
Sanctuary of Vicoforte in Vicoforte, Italy.

The Sanctuary of Vicoforte's oval dome, very close to an ellipse, was completed in 1731 and is the largest masonry dome of its kind in the world. It measures 37.15 meters by 24.8 meters at its base and is pierced by eight oval windows and a central oval oculus with a cupola. Although iron rings were used as part of the original construction at three levels to hold the dome together, cracks developed as the foundation settled further over the centuries. Additional reinforcement was added from 1985 to 1987 to halt their spread.

The style of Piedmont spread to Vienna, where Italian architects built oval-plan churches and inspired the building of others.

Many decades after Guarino Guarini's buildings used them, the crossed-arch dome was revived by Bernardo Vittone in projects such as the Sanctuary of Valinotto (1738–39) and the Chapel of San Luigi Gonzaga. Vittone was familiar with Guarini's work and his dome over the Church of San Bernardino in Chieri (1740–1744), the original of which had collapse in 1740, has been called "a lofty system of arches" due to the openings for light left in the pendentives and in the vaulting of adjacent bays.

==== Republic of Genoa ====
Oval domes are found in Liguria, such as the church of San Torpete (1730–33) in Genoa, but the use of stone in this region, rather than the brick predominant in the architecture of Piedmont, limited their size.

==== Electorate of Saxony ====
Bulbous domes gained in popularity in central and southern Germany and in Austria in the seventeenth and eighteenth centuries, particularly in the Baroque style. Dresden in particular has outstanding examples, including the lantern over the large central dome of the Frauenkirche, Dresden (1726–39).

==== Prince-Bishopric of Würzburg ====
German Baroque architecture resolved the tension between longitudinal and centralized spaces through the use of ovals. Examples include the domes of Balthasar Neumann's Hofkirche at Würzburg Residence (1733) and Hofkapelle at Werneck (1733).

Neumann's more traditional longitudinal churches had domes over their crossings, such as his churches at Etwashausen (1733–45) and Gaibach (1742–45).

==== Princely Abbey of St. Blasien ====
The two-shell dome of Saint Blaise Abbey in the Black Forest by French architect Pierre Michel d'Ixnard, with an internal span of 33.7 meters, dates from 1768 and rests on a ring of columns. It has been seen as a "landmark in the transition from Italian to French models in South German architecture" and may have been inspired by the Church of St. Genevieve, although the structural system was controversial. The 15.4-meter-wide (51 ft) center of the inner dome dates is a thin membrane structure that dates from 1910 to 1913.

=== Austrian monarchy ===
==== Kingdom of Naples ====
The Church of Saint Agostino in L'Aquila was built by Giovanni Battista Contini with an oval dome 21.5 meters by 15.5 meters after a 1703 earthquake destroyed the previous church. The oval dome was built directly on its piers, with no intervening drum. The outer octagonal timburio is non-structural but there are eight structural buttresses that support the dome through those walls. An earthquake in 2009 destroyed the lantern above the dome.

==== Archduchy of Austria ====
The Palais Schwarzenberg for Heinrich Franz von Mansfeld was designed by Johann Lukas von Hildebrandt, beginning in 1697, but the architect was replaced by Johann Bernhard Fischer von Erlach in 1720, who completed the building. It includes a domed vestibule the appears on the exterior only as a drum. The drum-without-dome motif may have been intended to refer to the "open crown" of German counts found on the House of Mansfeld heraldic crest, but may ultimately derive from engravings of the unfinished drum of St. Peter's Basilica published between 1564 and 1588.

The oval dome of St. Peter's Church in Vienna (1702–33) is almost exactly the same as Johann Bernhard Fischer von Erlach's Church of the Holy Trinity, although it was designed by Johann Lukas von Hildebrandt. The dome of von Erlach's Karlskirche (1716–24) is also very similar, but with round windows in the dome itself in addition to the windows of the drum and with dark trim at both the base of the drum and the base of the dome.

Empress Maria Theresa commissioned the Gardekirche as part of a relocated crown-sponsored hospital in Vienna and it was built between 1755 and 1763. Its oval dome was decorated in the rococo style popular among the city's elites and it would serve as a model for the church built in the Nadelburg, which was founded by the Habsburgs.

==== Kingdom of Sicily ====
Although the church of Sant'Ignazio all'Olivella in Palermo was opened in 1622, the dome was not designed until 1731. It was destroyed during World War II and replaced with a dome made of a combination or masonry and reinforced concrete.

==== Kingdom of Hungary ====
Because of the imprecision of oval domes in the Rococo period, resting them on drums created problems and the domes instead often rested directly on arches or pendentives. The oval dome of the Trinity church in Bratislava was built between 1717 and 1745. It is very similar to that of St. Peter's Church in Vienna, which the architect, Antonio Galli Bibiena, had briefly worked on, but is decorated instead by painting in the trompe-l'œil technique for which the Bibiena family is known.

==== Duchy of Mantua ====
The dome of the Basilica of Sant'Andrea, Mantua, was added to the 15th century church by Filippo Juvarra between 1733 and 1765.

The dome of Santa Maria Assumpta (c. 1770) in Sabbioneta, designed by Bibiena, employs a complex trompe-l'œil effect. A double dome, the inner dome is an open latticework through which the outer dome can be seen, which is painted to appear to be a clear sky.

== Dutch Republic ==
The Dome Church (1732–1736), or Nieuwe Hollandsche Kerk (New Dutch Church), was built by the Dutch East India Company in Batavia, Indonesia on the site of an earlier cruciform church. It was an octagonal building made of brick with granite elements, with a slate roof imported from Europe. It was built near the City Hall and contained tombs of important company officials and governors general. The dome included sixteen windows and an oculus under a lantern. Damaged by an earthquake three years after it was finished, it leaned at a slight angle. The tall distinctive building became a landmark for sailors and fishermen. It was sold in 1937 in a ruined state and a new building replaced it that houses the Wayang Museum. The church was included in numerous paintings and a model of the building has survived.

== Papal States ==
The church of Madonna di San Luca, situated on a high hill three miles from Bologna, has a Greek cross plan with a dome.

== Republic of Ragusa ==
A crossing dome on Dubrovnik Cathedral (1671–1713) had been part of the original 1671-1673 designs by Italian architect Andrea Bufalini to replace a Romanesque church that likewise had a crossing dome. Although the design was revised by architect Tommaso Napoli after 1689, the dome actually constructed by local and final architect Ilija Katičić after 1704 returned to the initial Bufalini design of a circular drum with classical features in the Roman Baroque style. The church is similar to the earlier San Giovanni dei Fiorentini, which has a 1618 dome by Carlo Maderno.

== Polish–Lithuanian Commonwealth ==
A small wooden Greek Catholic church in Równia, the Church of the Protection of the Mother of God (1700–1750) is representative of hundreds of wooden Uniate churches in Poland's eastern provinces. It is composed of three domed parts, following the traditional divisions of an Orthodox church building.

Polish churches evidently inspired by the work of Borromini and Guarino Guarini include the oval domed Cistercian Church at Ląd (1728–1735) by Pompeo Ferrari, the Dominican church in Lviv (1745–1759) by Jan de Witte, and the Church of St. Stanislaus the Bishop in Rydzyna (1746–1750) by Karol Marcin Frantz.

An example of a Polish Roman Catholic wooden dome can be found on a church in Mnichów built between 1765 and 1770.

A mosque in Dovbuchishki had an unusually large seven-sided wooden dome 11.5 meters high that covered the 7.5-meter (25 ft) width and most of the 11-meter (36 ft) length of the prayer hall. The dome was painted red with a tin crescent and dates on cemetery gravestones indicate it was built around 1767.

== Russian Empire ==
During the reign of Catherine the Great, Scottish architect Charles Cameron designed the Pavlovsk Palace (1781–1786) after Palladio's Villa Rotonda.

== Spanish Empire ==
In Granada, stuccowork was introduced by Francisco Hurtado Izquierdo and used to embellish classical forms in the dome (c. 1702) and sacristy dome (c. 1713–42) of La Cartuja, in contrast to earlier vaults such as that of San Jerónimo (1523–43), which used diagonal ribs in an idiosyncratic way and had apparent Moorish influences.

The church of Santa María Magdalena (1690–1709) in Seville has a nine-meter diameter dome built by Leonardo de Figueroa with an inner brick dome and outer wooden shell, similar to the system used for the Piedad chapel in Seville's Hermandad del Baratillo (1724).

Examples of Baroque domes in Naples include Santissima Trinità dei Pellegrini, which has neither drum nor lantern, Santa Maria della Colonna, which has a drum but no lantern, Sant'Angelo a Nilo, which is the only dome in the city to have a lantern but no drum, and Santissima Annunziata Maggiore, which has both a drum and a lantern like most domes of its era.

In the Valencian Community, thin brick domes covered in glazed tiles were built using techniques later made famous by Rafael Guastavino. The Church of Sant Roc d'Oliva (1729) in Oliva was built with an ellipsoidal dome over a low drum on a Greek cross plan and a half-dome with lantern over the retrochoir. The ribbed seven meter wide dome was made in a single shell of two layers of brick with a thickness one hundredth of the dome's span. The dome is covered by blue glazed roofing tiles in eight sections separated by lines of white tiles. Other contemporary Valencian examples include those at the Church of Saint Thomas and Saint Philip Neri and the Church of Saint Andrew the Apostle.

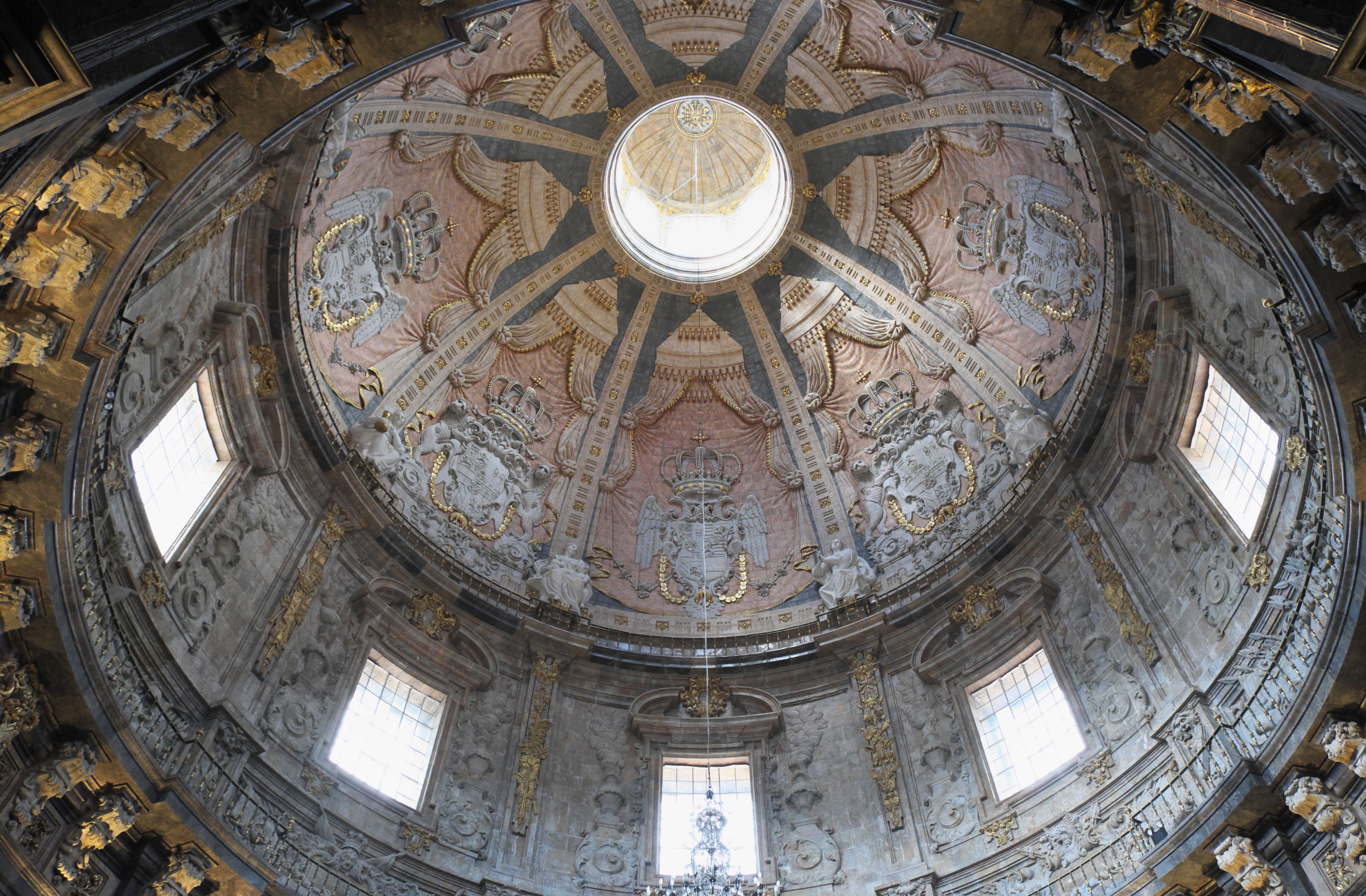
The Sanctuary of St. Ignatius of Loyola

Resolution of the War of the Spanish Succession allowed work to resume in 1717 on the Sanctuary of St. Ignatius of Loyola, begun in 1689. The dome designed by Carlo Fontana was completed in 1738 by Ignacio Ibero. The 20-meter-wide (66 ft) dome was uniquely made of two stone shells about 32 cm apart, connected by eight ribs. The outer stone dome was arched slightly steeper than the inner hemispherical shell, but structural issues required two iron bands to be added at the base for reinforcement immediately upon completion. The inner stone dome was highly decorated with relief carving by Ibero, who had been an apprentice to the Churriguera and their followers.

The Basilica of St. Juan de Dios (1734–1757) in Granada was built by José de Bada as a mausoleum church for the remains of St. John of God. The otherwise stone-vaulted church has a crossing dome composed of an inner brick shell and an outer wooden shell, following the treatise advice of Fray Lorenzo. The four supporting arches beneath the pendentives were doubled in width after 1738 due to structural concerns. The inner hemispherical shell of the dome, 11.7 meters in diameter, is connected to and supports only the thin inner brick shell of the lantern. The outer wooden shell supports the outer brick shell of the lantern and transfers its weight to the drum. The exterior of the dome is roofed with green and white glazed tiles, as occurs frequently in southeast Spain.

The Hermitage of San Marcos (1784) in Olocau del Rey was built with a 9.20-meter (30.2 ft) dome in two shells over a slender brick drum with Mudéjar influences on a Greek cross plan. The inner dome is six centimeters thick on average, using a single layer of brick between eight ribs made of two layers of brick. The higher outer shell is two bricks thick at an average of nine centimeters.

The crossing dome of the Archpriestal Church of San Jaime (1779) in Villarreal was 12 meters wide and included a wrought iron chain, discovered during restoration. The octagonal drum has eight windows that penetrate the circular dome with conical vaulting from the lunettes, creating a gothic appearance. Both the inner and outer shells are two bricks thick.

The rotunda of the Escola Pía (last third of the eighteenth century) has a diameter of 24.5 meters and can be considered the culmination of the Valencian classicist domes.

The dome of the Royal Chapel of St. Anthony of La Florida (1798) in Madrid was unusually painted by Francisco Goya to depict the actions of the saint on Earth, rather than heavenly scenes.

=== Viceroyalty of New Spain ===
The domes in Mexico are single shell constructions with few exceptions. Examples include the Convent of San Francisco, the Temple of San Fernando, and La Santísima Church. Domes and lanterns are commonly covered with glazed tiles. The Capilla Real at the San Gabriel Franciscan Convent in Cholula, Mexico, had nine barrel vaults covering its nine naves when completed in 1544 but these collapsed in 1588. A long project to replace the roofing with tiled domes was completed in 1731, giving the chapel an appearance similar to the hypostyle hall of the Mosque–Cathedral of Córdoba.

The church at the Mission San Xavier del Bac was built by 1797 in the northwestern frontier of Pimería Alta in New Spain, today Arizona. The cruciform church has a dome at the crossing and a dome over the sacristy, built with fired adobe bricks set in lime mortar. The dome is supported on an octagonal base formed by corbelled triangular panels under squinches. The twelve-inch-thick dome was built about 16 metres (53 ft) over the floor, either with an all-wooden centering or with a wooden structure supporting a layer of earth fill to support the dome during construction. The technique of using earth fill above a timber falsework had been used in Europe to build domes since the Romanesque era, and continued to be used in Mexico into the twentieth century.

=== Kingdom of Sicily ===
The dome of Trapani Cathedral was built from 1734 to 1736 by Giovanni Amico, following the Palermo earthquake of 1726. It was built with four cylindrical buttresses attached to the drum.

The oval dome of the Church of Santa Chiara in Noto, Sicily, was built by Rosario Gagliardi and completed in 1753. It is a false dome 20.5 meters long and 13.2 meters wide and made of a series of parallel wooden arches hidden with planks and stucco on the inside surface. Unlike similar work elsewhere in Italy, it is self-supporting and unconnected to the earlier truss roof above it. The oval domes of the church of the Addolorata at Niscemi was based on designs by Gagliardi and the 1755 vault over the church of San Giuseppe in Syracuse by Carmelo Bonaiuto is also related. The dome over the crossing of four ribs springing from the centers of it supporting arches and is also a self-supporting false vault made of wood covered in plaster.

After the destruction of the 1693 earthquake in the Val di Noto region of Sicily, churches were rebuilt in the Baroque style, often with tall domes. Because of the high costs involved and the priority for the churches being to reopen, the domes were completed up to a century after the start of reconstruction and used the simplified decorative style popular at that time. In Catania, the domes built included those of Badia di Sant'Agata (1759–1767), 16 meters wide on an octagonal drum, San Michele Arcangelo (1771-1787 or 1779), 11 meters wide on a circular drum with iron chains added in 1850, San Nicolò l’Arena (1778–1780), 13.75 meters wide on a circular drum and reinforced pillars, and the Cathedral (1793–1800), which had a dome completed in 1717 that was replaced with a larger dome 12.5 meters in diameter to compete with the dome of Badia di Sant'Agata. In Caltagirone, the dome of Santa Maria del Monte (1774–1780) was built 8 meters wide on a cylindrical drum. In Piazza Armerina, the dome of the Cathedral (1760–1767) was made 13.75 meters wide over a cylindrical drum.

=== Viceroyalty of Peru ===
The dome of Iglesia de El Sagrario, Quito (begun 1695), is the highest in Quito and was built both wider and higher than the dome of the earlier Church of Our Lady of Guápulo. The Chapel of the Virgin of the Rosary (1733–1750) in the Church of Santo Domingo in Quito was built with three segments. The first two are capped with high domes and lanterns. The third segment, behind the sanctuary, has a smaller dome and lantern.

Churches with timber vaults were built in Peru under the viceroyalty. St. Jerome Cathedral in Ica, representative of churches built along the Peruvian coast, was built with timber vaults over its nave and transept, small timber domes over its aisles, and a large timber crossing dome, supported on timber-framed pillars. It was severely damaged by the 2007 Peru earthquake.

Quincha domes following the 17th century model of the Church of San Francesco in Lima were built in the capital and elsewhere, such as the dome over the imperial staircase of the Mercedarian main cloister that was rebuilt between 1759 and 1762. Other 18th century examples include the dome of the church of San Francisco in Trujillo (rebuilt after 1759) and the dome of the camarín of the church of La Merced in Lima (1774).

=== Viceroyalty of New Granada ===
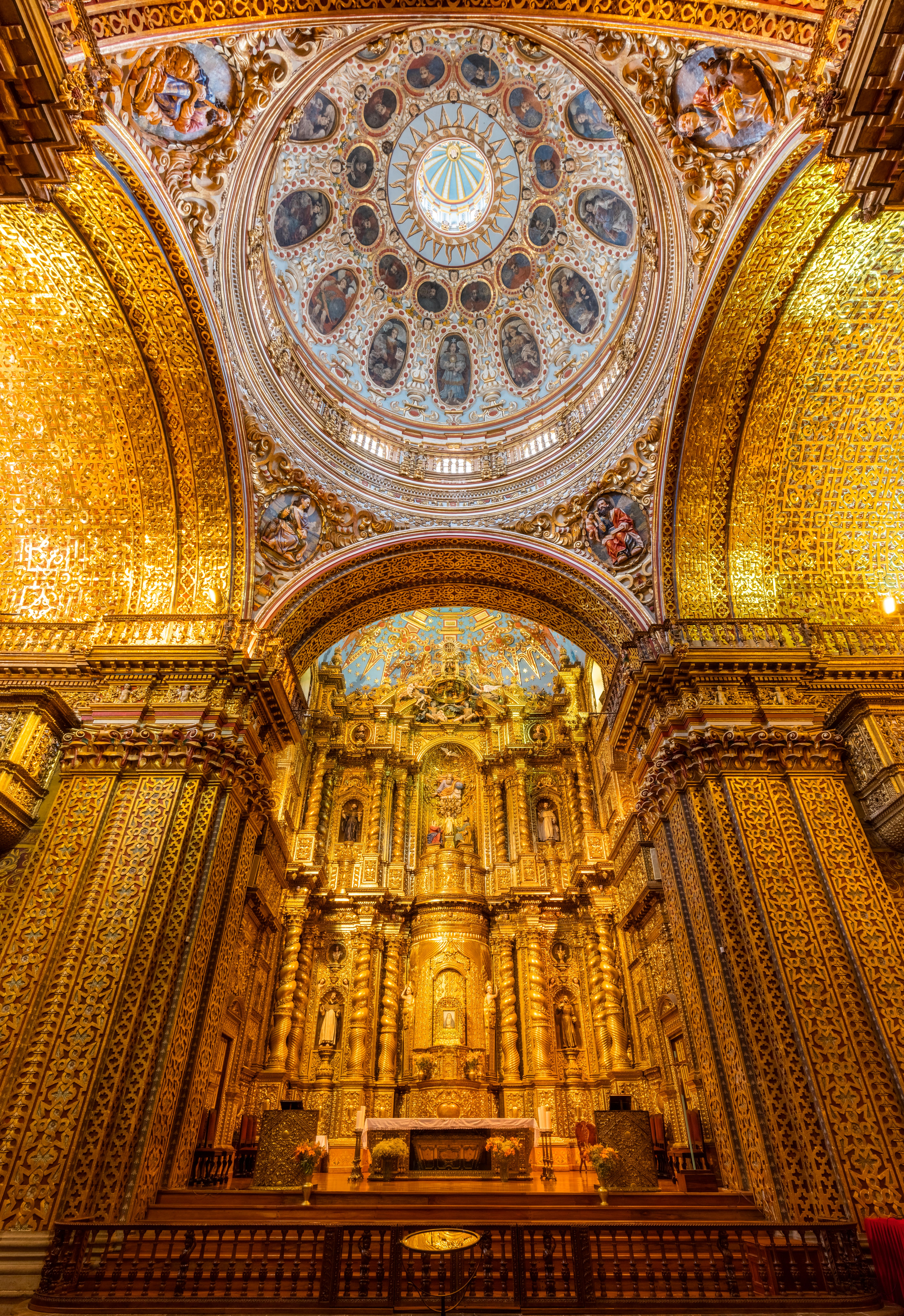
The Church of the Compañía de Jesús in Quito, Ecuador.

In Quito, Ecuador, La Iglesia de la Compañía de Jesús was built about 100 km away from an active fault line. The dome was built with adobe-concrete and tiles. Although the cruciform arrangement of the church allows it to withstand some horizontal force, the materials used were chosen for their resistance to compression only and the earthquakes it has experienced have required many repairs.

== Portuguese Empire ==
=== Kingdom of Portugal ===
Domes were rare in Portuguese architecture, but can be found in churches associated with the royal court, such as the Palace of Mafra, Igreja da Memória (started in 1760), Estrela Basilica (1779–1790), and N. S. de Ares at Viana do Alentejo (1743). The architecture of northern Portugal generally avoided masonry vaulting after the Romanesque period but used wooden ceilings to simulate it.

=== Portuguese America ===
After the middle of the seventeenth century, large churches in Minas Gerais and elsewhere included cupolas at the top of their facade towers. Wooden ceilings over oval naves in this region of Brazil imitated cloister vaults or shallow oval domes, which may be an influence of the architecture of northern Portugal. Examples include the churches of N. S. do Carmo (1774), N. S. do Rosário (c. 1785), and S. Francisco de Assis (1763–1794). Other domes include those of the Church of Saint Anne in Belém, Candelária Church in Rio de Janeiro, and the chapels of the Sanctuary of Bom Jesus de Matosinhos.

== United States ==
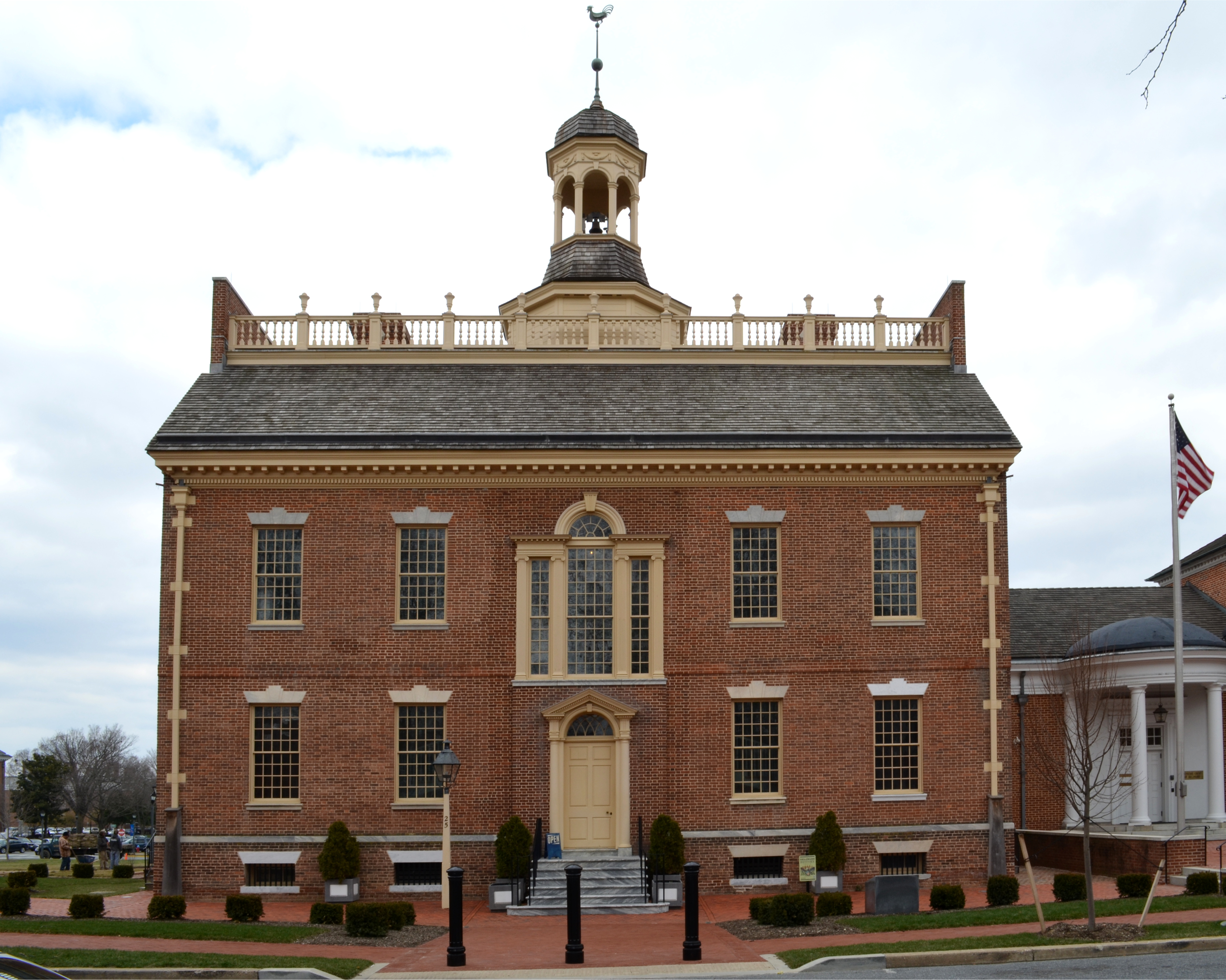
The Old State House in Dover, Delaware.

In the United States, most public buildings in the late 18th century were only distinguishable from private residences because they featured cupolas, such as that of the Maryland State House or the smaller, and more typical, example over the Old State House of Delaware. Maryland State House in Annapolis was rebuilt in the 1770s with a pointed octagonal dome designed in 1772, the first over an American state house. The dome was covered with copper sheeting. Annapolis served as the capital of the country for ten months beginning in 1783, during which time George Washington resigned his military commission and Congress formally approved the Treaty of Paris, ending the American Revolutionary War. This dome, which leaked and was criticized as "inadequate, unimpressive, and too small for the building" and constructed "contrary to the rules of architecture", was replaced with the taller present design after 1784. The present dome was made of wood held together with wooden pegs and the exterior was completed by 1788; the interior was completed by 1797. The dome is similar to that of the Schlossturm in Karlsruhe, Germany. It is topped with an original lightning rod to Benjamin Franklin's design, supported by a surrounding copper and gold acorn and pedestal. The Massachusetts State House, built in the decade after the Maryland State House dome, included a dome after it was decided that the national capitol building would have one.

The design for the national capitol building approved by George Washington included a dome modeled on the Pantheon but the design was subsequently revised and construction did not begin until 1822. Several states added prominent domes to their assembly buildings as a result of the choice for the national capitol, and completed them before the national capitol dome was finished. Architect Charles Bulfinch, following a tour of Europe from 1785 to 1787, designed and built both the Connecticut State House (1793–1796) and the Massachusetts State House (1795–1797) before the national capitol competition concluded. The Connecticut State House appears to have been a simplified version of Liverpool Town Hall (1748–1755). Although Bulfinch designed the Connecticut State House with a dome, a dome was not actually built until 1822 and used a different design possibly based upon that of New York City Hall. Bulfinch took inspiration from London's Somerset House (1776–1784) for the Massachusetts State House exterior and the domed Great Room of James Wyatt's Pantheon (1772) for the Representative's Hall. In Massachusetts, the exterior dome is not visible from the interior of the building. The wooden exterior of the dome was initially painted white, then covered in canvas painted to resemble lead roofing with a gilded pinecone finial. The entire dome was later gilded.

Thomas Jefferson's Monticello, begun in the 1770s, had the first dome to be built on an American home. The octagonal saucer dome with skylight oculus was built with curved wooden ribs made of four layers of short overlapping curved planks joined with iron nails. Wooden purlins braced the ribs in two horizontal rings. The dome was completed after 1796. The inspiration for Jefferson's dome seems to have been the similar octagonal dome at Wrotham Park designed in 1754 by Isaac Ware, which has since been removed, rather than the octagonal dome at Chiswick House. Wrotham Park's dome was also positioned directly behind a portico, used round windows, and covered a space that did not extend down to the ground floor.

== See also ==
- Early and simple domes
- History of modern period domes

== Bibliography ==
- Allen, William C. (2001), Senate Document 106-29: History of the United States Capitol: A Chronicle of Design, Construction, and Politics, U.S. Government Printing Office
- Alonso-Durá, Adolfo (2006), "The Eighteen Century Brickwork Domes in Valencia", Proceedings of the Second International Congress on Construction History: Queens' College, Cambridge University, 29th March - 2nd April 2006, vol. 3, Construction History Society, pp. 2945–2963
- Aoki, Takayoshi; Chiorino, Mario Alberto; Roccati, Roberto (January 2003). Huerta, S. (ed.). "Structural Characteristics of the Elliptical Masonry Dome of the Sanctuary of Vicoforte" (PDF). Proceedings of the First International Congress on Construction History, Madrid, 20th-24th January 2003. Madrid: I. Juan de Herrera, SEdHC, ETSAM, A. E. Benvenuto, COAM, F. Dragados: 203–212. Archived from the original (PDF) on 2015-09-09.
- Bagliani, Stefano (May 2009). "The Architecture and Mechanics of Elliptical Domes" (PDF). Proceedings of the Third International Congress on Construction History, Cottbus. Archived from the original (PDF) on 2013-10-16.
- Baxter, Sylvester (1902). Spanish-colonial Architecture in Mexico. Vol. 1 (Gómez de Mora ed.). Boston, MA: J. B. Millet. p. 236.
- Bellini, Federico (2017). "8 Vaults and Domes: Statics as an Art". In Mallgrave, Harry Francis; Payne, Alina (eds.). Companion to the History of Architecture, Volume I, Renaissance and Baroque Architecture. John Wiley & Sons, Ltd. pp. 1–33. doi:10.1002/9781118887226.wbcha009. ISBN 978-1-118-88722-6.
- Benincampi, Iacopo (2017). "Roman Baroque Models and Local Traditional Construction. The Sanctuary of St. Ignatius of Loyola and its dome" (PDF). X Congreso Nacional y II Internacional Hispanoamericano de Historia de la Construcción. Madrid: Istituto Juan De Herrera: 175–184.
- Bergdoll, Barry (September 1987). "Reviewed Work(s): Pierre Michel d'Ixnard, 1723-1795, Leben und Werk by Erich Franz; Friedrich Weinbrenner, Architect of Karlsruhe: A Catalogue of the Drawings in the Architectural Archives of the University of Pennsylvania by David Brownlee". Journal of the Society of Architectural Historians. 46 (3). University of California Press: 307–309. doi:10.2307/990247. JSTOR 990247.
- Berger, Robert W. (October 1966). "Antoine Le Pautre and the Motif of the Drum-without-Dome". Journal of the Society of Architectural Historians. 25 (3). University of California Press: 165–180. doi:10.2307/988398. JSTOR 988398.
- Blasi, Carlo; Coisson, Eva (2006). "The importance of historical documents for the study of stability in ancient buildings: The French Panthéon case study". Asian Journal of Civil Engineering (Building and Housing). 7 (4): 359–368.
- Born, Wolfgang (April 1944). "The Introduction of the Bulbous Dome into Gothic Architecture and its Subsequent Development". Speculum. 19 (2): 208–221. doi:10.2307/2849071. JSTOR 2849071. S2CID 162699497.
- Camilloni, Humberto Rodríguez (January 2003). Huerta, S. (ed.). "Quincha architecture: The development of an antiseismic structural system in seventeenth century Lima" (PDF). Proceedings of the First International Congress on Construction History, Madrid, 20th-24th January 2003. Madrid: I. Juan de Herrera, SEdHC, ETSAM, A. E. Benvenuto, COAM, F. Dragados: 1741–1752.
- Casey, Christine (2005). Dublin: The City Within the Grand and Royal Canals and the Circular Road with the Phoenix Park. Yale University Press. ISBN 978-0-300-10923-8.
- Castex, Jean (2008). Architecture of Italy. Reference Guides to National Architecture. Westport, CT: Greenwood Press. ISBN 978-0-313-32086-6.
- Cavalagli, Nicola; Gusella, Vittorio (November 2014). "Structural Investigation of 18th-Century Ogival Masonry Domes: From Carlo Fontana to Bernardo Vittone". International Journal of Architectural Heritage. 9 (3): 265–276. doi:10.1080/15583058.2013.771294. S2CID 110969076.
- Cennamo, Claudia; Cusano, Concetta (2020). "The "Baroque skyline" in Naples. Structural studies on 16th and 17th century domes in terms of form and stability". Architecture and Engineering. 5 (2): 8–16. doi:10.23968/2500-0055-2020-5-2-08-16. S2CID 225716551.
- Ceravolo, Rosario; Chiorino, Mario Alberto; Novello, Giuseppa; Abbiati, Giuseppe; Fragonara, Luca Zanotti (2015). "Reconciling geometry and dynamics: models for oval domes" (PDF). Domes and Cupolas. 2 (1): 61–73.
- Chervonnaya, Svetlana Mikhailovna (2014). "The Architecture of the Wooden Mosques of Lithuanian Tatars" (PDF). Tatarica (2). Kazan (Volga Region) Federal University: 179–194.
- Cottone, Antonio; Bertorotta, Simona (2009), "New Domes for Old Churches (Palermo 1943)", Proceedings of the Third International Congress on Construction History, vol. 1, Cottbus, Germany: NEUNPLUS1
- Cowan, Henry J. (1977). "A History of Masonry and Concrete Domes in Building Construction". Building and Environment. 12 (1). Great Britain: Pergamon Press: 1–24. Bibcode:1977BuEnv..12....1C. doi:10.1016/0360-1323(77)90002-6. hdl:2027/mdp.39015041999635.
- Cowan, Henry J. (1983). "Domes: Ancient and Modern". Journal of the Royal Society of Arts. 131 (5320). Royal Society for the Encouragement of Arts, Manufactures and Commerce: 181–198. JSTOR 41373544.
- Denny, Mark (2010). Super Structures: The Science of Bridges, Buildings, Dams, and Other Feats of Engineering. Baltimore, Maryland: Johns Hopkins University Press. ISBN 978-0-8018-9436-7.
- Earls, Michael W. (1971). "The Development of Structural Form in Franconian Rococo". In Malo, Paul (ed.). Essays to D. Kenneth Sargent. Syracuse, New York: The School of Architecture, Syracuse University. pp. 127–139.
- Escrig, F.; Cobreros, A.; Valcarcel, J.P. (1997), "The elliptical dome: a survey of constructive technique to stabilize a sophisticated structure", Structural studies, repairs and maintenance of historical buildings (STREMAH): proceedings of the 5th conference, San Sebastian, Spain, 1997, Advances in architecture series: Vol. 3, Computational Mechanics Publications
- Evans, George William David (1835). The Classic and Connoisseur in Italy and Sicily: With an Appendix Containing an Abridged Translation of Lanzi's Storia Pittorica, Volume 3. London, England: Longman, Rees, Orme, Brown, Green & Longman.
- Ferreira, Carina F.; D’Ayala, Dina (2014), "Structural analysis of timber vaulted structures with masonry walls" (PDF), in Peña, F.; Chávez, M. (eds.), Proceedings of the SAHC 2014—9th International Conference on Structural Analysis of Historical Constructions, vol. 14, Mexico City, Mexico: Instituto de Ciencias de la Construcción Eduardo Torroja, Consejo Superior de Investigaciones Científicas (IETcc-CSIC)
- Floriano, Laura; Liuzzo, Mariangela; Margani, Giuseppe (2018), "Geometry and construction techniques of late-baroque domes in central-Eastern Sicily", 4th Biennial of Architectural and Urban Restoration, BRAU4 host of the Itinerant Congress Hidden Cultural Heritage: Under Water, Under Ground And Within Buildings 15–30 April, 2018, Mexico City, Mexico: CICOP Italia, pp. 691–701, ISBN 978-88-909-1165-1
- Fuentes, P.; Huerta, S. (2010). "Islamic Domes of Crossed-arches: Origin, Geometry and Structural Behavior". In Chen, Baochun; Wei, Jiangang (eds.). ARCH'10 – 6th International Conference on Arch Bridges, October 11–13, 2010 (PDF). Fuzhou, Fujian, China: Fuzhou University. pp. 346–353. ISBN 978-953-7621-10-0. Archived from the original (PDF) on 2014-04-27.
- Giordano, Ralph G. (2012). The Architectural Ideology of Thomas Jefferson. McFarland & Company, Inc. ISBN 978-0-7864-9091-2.
- Goss, Robert C. (1972). "The Problem of Erecting the Main Dome and Roof Vaults of the Church of San Xavier del Bac". Kiva, Journal of the Arizona Archaeological and Historical Society, Inc. 37 (3). Taylor & Francis: 117–127. JSTOR 30247616.
- Grishin, Yakov Yakovlevich; Sharafutdinov, Denis Radievich; Galiullin, Marat Zufarovich (2019). "The heritage of muslim culture in the history of Lithuania and Poland" (PDF). Opción: Revista de Ciencias Humanas y Sociales. 35 (22). Universidad del Zulia: 846–858. eISSN 2477-9385. ISSN 1012-1587.
- Hanser, David A. (2006). Architecture of France. Greenwood Press. ISBN 978-0-313-31902-0.
- Harnsberger, Douglas (1981). ""In Delorme's Manner..." An X-Ray Probe of Jefferson's Dome at Monticello Reveals an Ingenious 16th-Century Timber Vault Construction Concealed within the Dome's Sheathing". Bulletin of the Association for Preservation Technology. 13 (4). Association for Preservation Technology International (APT): 2–8. doi:10.2307/1494048. JSTOR 1494048.
- Heyman, Jacques (January 1998). "Hooke's Cubico-Parabolical Conoid". Notes and Records of the Royal Society of London. 52 (1). Royal Society: 39–50. doi:10.1098/rsnr.1998.0033. JSTOR 532075.
- Higgins, Charlotte (2015). Under Another Sky: Journeys in Roman Britain. Abrams Press. ISBN 978-1-468-31236-2.
- Hitchcock, Henry-Russell (October 1965). "The Brothers Asam and the Beginnings of Bavarian Rococo Church Architecture: Part 1. Through the Early 1720s". Journal of the Society of Architectural Historians. 24 (3). University of California Press on behalf of the Society of Architectural Historians: 186–228. doi:10.2307/988343. JSTOR 988343.
- Horvat-Levaj, Katarina (February 6, 2015). "The Sicilian Architect Tommaso Maria Napoli and the Baroque Cathedral of Dubrovnik". Riha Journal 0116.
- Huerta, Santigo (2001). "Mechanics of masonry vaults: The equilibrium approach" (PDF). In Lourenço, Paulo B.; Roca, Pere (eds.). Historical Constructions 2001: possibilities of numerical and experimental techniques: proceedings of the 3rd International Seminar. Guimarães: University of Minho. pp. 47–69. ISBN 972-8692-01-3.
- Huerta, Santiago (2008). "The analysis of masonry architecture: A historical approach: To the memory of professor Henry J. Cowan" (PDF). Architectural Science Review. 51 (4). University of Sydney: 297–328. doi:10.3763/asre.2008.5136.
- Jeffery, R. Brooks (2003). "From Azulejos to Zaguanes: The Islamic Legacy in the Built Environment of Hispano-America". Journal of the Southwest. 45 (1). Southwest Center, University of Arizona: 289–327. JSTOR 40170260.
- Johns, Richard (2009). "'An Air of Grandeur & Modesty': James Thornhill's Painting in the Dome of St. Paul's Cathedral". Eighteenth-Century Studies. 42 (4). The Johns Hopkins University Press: 501–527. doi:10.1353/ecs.0.0078. JSTOR 40264233.
- King, Julia (2000), "The American Dome: Symbol of Democracy", Domes. Papers Read at the Annual Symposium of the Society of Architectural Historians of Great Britain., Society of Architectural Historians of Great Britain, pp. 83–98, archived from the original on 2021-09-04
- Krasny, Piotr (1999). "Architecture in Poland 1572-1764". In Ostrowski, Jan K. (ed.). Land of the Winged Horsemen: Art in Poland 1572-1764. New Haven, London: Art Services International. pp. 81–97. doi:10.11588/artdok.00002768.
- Kurrer, Karl-Eugen (2012). The History of the Theory of Structures: From Arch Analysis to Computational Mechanics. John Wiley & Sons. p. 848. ISBN 978-3-433-60134-1.
- Kurrer, Karl-Eugen (2018). The History of the Theory of Structures: Searching for Equilibrium. Translated by Thrift, Philip (2nd ed.). John Wiley & Sons. p. 1212. ISBN 978-3-433-60914-9.
- Mainstone, Rowland (Autumn 1999). "The Dome of St Peter's: Structural Aspects of its Design and Construction, and Inquiries into its Stability". AA Files (39). Architectural Association School of Architecture: 21–39. JSTOR 29544154.
- Marino, Bianca (2012), "Significances and image of dome in the controversy about the restoration of the Parisian Panthéon between eighteenth and nineteenth century", in Tampone, G.; Corazzi, R.; Mandelli, E. (eds.), Domes in the World. Cultural Identity and Symbolism. Geometric and Formal Genesis. Construction, Identification, Conservation, Florence, Italy: Nardini Editore, pp. 15–28, ISBN 978-884-04421-12
- Mark, Robert; Billington, David P. (1989). "Structural Imperative and the Origin of New Form". Technology and Culture. 30 (2): 300–329. doi:10.2307/3105106. JSTOR 3105106. S2CID 111941107.
- McNeil, Ian, ed. (2002). An Encyclopaedia of the History of Technology. Routledge. ISBN 978-1-134-98165-6.
- McParland, Edward (February 1989). "Edward Lovett Pearce and the Parliament House in Dublin". The Burlington Magazine. 131 (1031): 91–100. JSTOR 883752.
- Millers, Keith (2007). St. Peter's. Harvard University Press. ISBN 978-0-674-02689-6.
- Murray, Linda; Murray, Peter; Jones, Tom Devonshire, eds. (2013), The Oxford Dictionary of Christian Art and Architecture (2nd ed.), Oxford University Press, ISBN 978-0-199-68027-6
- Nobile, Marco Rosario; Bares, Maria Mercedes (2015). "The use of 'false vaults' in 18th century buildings of Sicily". Construction History. 30 (1). The Construction History Society: 53–70. JSTOR 44215897.
- Nuttgens, Patrick (1997). The Story of Architecture. Hong Kong: Phaidon Press Limited. ISBN 978-0-7148-3616-4.
- Ottoni, Federica; Blasi, Carlo (2016). "Hooping as an ancient remedy for conservation of large masonry domes". International Journal of Architectural Heritage. 10 (2–3). Taylor & Francis Group: 164–181. doi:10.1080/15583058.2015.1113335.
- Pajovic, Luka (2024). Holzer, Stefan; Langenberg, Silke; Knobling, Clemens; Kasap, Orkun (eds.). "Thin Timber Domes in Restoration England (c. 1670–1680)". Construction Matters: Proceedings of the 8th international congress on construction history - Zürich. vdf Hochschulverlag AG: 730–737. doi:10.3218/4166-8. hdl:10071/34329. ISBN 978-3-7281-4166-8.
- Palmer, Allison Lee (2009). The A to Z of Architecture. Scarecrow Press. ISBN 978-0-810-87058-1.
- Pavani, Raffaella (2020). "Chapter 28 Challenging Mathematical Insights into Masonry Domes Over the Centuries". In Abali, Bilen Emek; Giorgio, Ivan (eds.). Vol 130 Developments and Novel Approaches in Nonlinear Solid Body Mechanics. Advanced Structured Materials. Vol. 130. Springer. pp. 469–479. doi:10.1007/978-3-030-50460-1_28. ISBN 978-3-030-50460-1.
- Pavlovic, Milorad; Reccia, Emanuele; Cecchi, Antonella (2014), "Limit analysis of masonry domes: the case of Hagia Sophia and Anime Sante", Conference: MONUBASIN - 9th International Symposium on the Conservation of Monuments in the Mediterrean Basin, Ankara, Turkey: Middle East Technical University (METU)
- Place, Charles Alpheus (1925). Charles Bulfinch, Architect and Citizen. Houghton Mifflin. LCCN 25027877.
- Richardson, Albert E. (2001). Monumental Classic Architecture in Great Britain and Ireland. Dover Publications. p. 123. ISBN 978-0-486-41534-5.
- Robison, Elwin C. (December 1991). "Optics and Mathematics in the Domed Churches of Guarino Guarini". Journal of the Society of Architectural Historians. 50 (4): 384–401. doi:10.2307/990663. JSTOR 990663.
- Rodríguez, V.; Čizmar, D.; Rajčić, V. (2010). "Architectural and structural comparisment of South American and European timber frame structures". In J. da Sousa Cruz, Paulo (ed.). Structures & Architecture. CRC Press. ISBN 978-1-439-86297-1.
- Schlimme, Hermann (2006). "Construction Knowledge in Comparison: Architects, Mathematicians and Natural Philosophers Discuss the Damage to St. Peters Dome in 1743" (PDF). International Congress on Construction History. 2: 2853–2867.
- Seale, William (1975). "Symbol as Architecture". Design Quarterly (94/95). Walker Art Center: 14–15. doi:10.2307/4090872. JSTOR 4090872.
- Seale, William; Oxendorf, Eric (1994). Domes of America. Pomegranate Artbooks. ISBN 9780876540701.
- Shearman, John (1992), "IV Domes", Only Connect: Art and the Spectator in the Italian Renaissance, vol. 5579, Princeton University Press, pp. 149–191, doi:10.2307/j.ctvhhhdpb.9
- Silk, Michael; Gildenhard, Ingo; Barrow, Rosemary (2017). The Classical Tradition: Art, Literature, Thought. John Wiley & Sons. ISBN 978-1-405-15550-2.
- Sinopoli, Anna (2010). "No Tension behaviour and Best Shape of Pseudo-Vaults". Construction History. 25. The Construction History Society: 21–51. JSTOR 41613958.
- Smith Jr, Robert C. (1939). "The colonial architecture of Minas Gerais in Brazil" (PDF). The Art Bulletin. 21 (2). College Art Association: 32–54. doi:10.1080/00043079.1939.11408729.
- Stephenson, Davis; Hammond, Victoria; Davi, Keith F. (2005). Visions of Heaven: the Dome in European Architecture. Princeton Architectural Press. ISBN 978-1-56898-549-7.
- Stillman, Damie (May 1979). "Church Architecture in Neo-Classical England". Journal of the Society of Architectural Historians. 38 (2). University of California Press on behalf of the Society of Architectural Historians: 103–119. doi:10.2307/989422. JSTOR 989422.
- Suárez, Javier; Boothby, Thomas E.; González, José A. (2020). "Constructive and structural analysis of a Baroque dome in Spain. The encamonada dome". Journal of Cultural Heritage. 44. Elsevier: 229–238. doi:10.1016/j.culher.2019.12.005.
- Suratminto, Lilie (2010). "The Standing and the Collapse of the Dome Church in Batavia in the 18th Century and Early 19th Century". TAWARIKH International Journal for Historical Studies. 2 (1). Bandung, Indonesia: ASPENSI [Asosiasi Sarjana Pendidikan Sejarah Indonesia]: 23–40. ISSN 2085-0980. Archived from the original on 2018-05-01.
- Tempesta, Giacomo; Paradiso, Michele; Galassi, Stefano; Pieroni, Eva (2015). "Maurice Lévy's original contribution to the analysis of masonry domes" (PDF). Domes and Cupolas. 2 (2). Florence, Italy: Angelo Pontecorboli Editore: 85–91.
- Turek, Martin; Ventura, Carlos; Placencia, Patricio (January 2002). "Dynamic Characteristics of a 17th Century Church in Quito, Ecuador". Proceedings of the International Society of Optical Engineering. 4753: 1259–1264.
- Tyack, Geoffrey (2015). "A Pantheon for Horses: The Prince Regent's Dome and Stables at Brighton". Architectural History. 58. SAHGB Publications Limited: 141–158. doi:10.1017/S0066622X00002616. JSTOR 26406256.
- Vondráčková, Terezie; Nývlt, Vladimír; Plachý, Jan (2016). "The Significance of Baroque Gothic Architecture in the Czech Republic" (PDF). Procedia Engineering. 161: 1757–1762. doi:10.1016/j.proeng.2016.08.772.
- Wallis, Kendall (2010). "Bearing Bandmann's Meaning: A Translator's Introduction by Kendall Willis". In Bandmann, Günter (ed.). Early Medieval Architecture as Bearer of Meaning. Translated by Kendall Wallis. Columbia University Press. ISBN 978-0-231-50172-9.
- Webster, Susan Verdi (2006). "Confraternities as Patrons of Architecture in Colonial Quito, Ecuador". In Black, Christopher F.; Gravestock, Pamela (eds.). Early Modern Confraternities in Europe and the Americas: International and Interdisciplinary Perspectives. Ashgate Publishing, Ltd. ISBN 978-0-754-65174-1.
- Whiffen, Marcus; Koeper, Frederick (1983). Koeper, Frederick (ed.). American Architecture: 1607-1860, Volume 1 (reprint ed.). MIT Press. ISBN 978-0-262-73069-3.
- Wilson, Mabel O. (2019). Thomas Jefferson, Architect: Palladian Models, Democratic Principles, and the Conflict of Ideals (unabridged ed.). Yale University Press. ISBN 978-0-300-24620-9.
- Yonan, Michael (Winter 2009). "Ornament's Invitation: The Rococo of Vienna's Gardekirche". The Eighteenth Century. 50 (4): 285–308. doi:10.1353/ecy.0.0043. S2CID 145205597.
- History of the State House and Its Dome, Maryland State Archives, 2007
- The Dome and Lightning Rod, Maryland State Archives, 2007
- The Dome and Lightning Rod; The First Dome: 1769 - 1774, Maryland State Archives, 2007
- The Dome and Lightning Rod; The Second Dome: 1785-1794, Maryland State Archives, 2007
