= Santa Caterina, Casale Monferrato =

Roman Catholic church in Casale Monferrato, Italy

Coordinates: 45.13653°N 8.44835°E

Santa Caterina is a Baroque-style, Roman Catholic church located on Piazza Castello #36, in Casale Monferrato, Province of Alessandria, region of Piedmont, Italy.

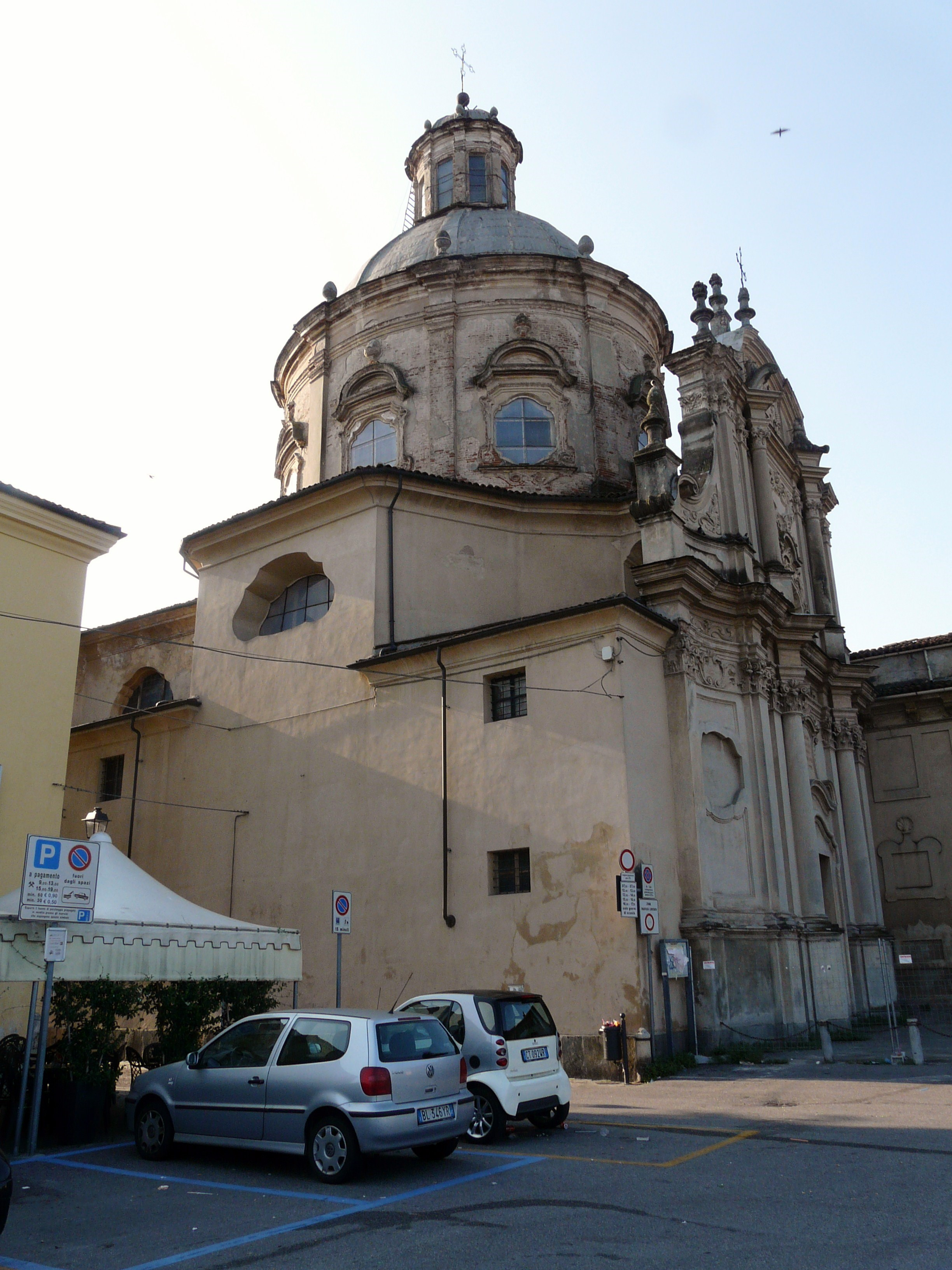
Side view of façade with dome

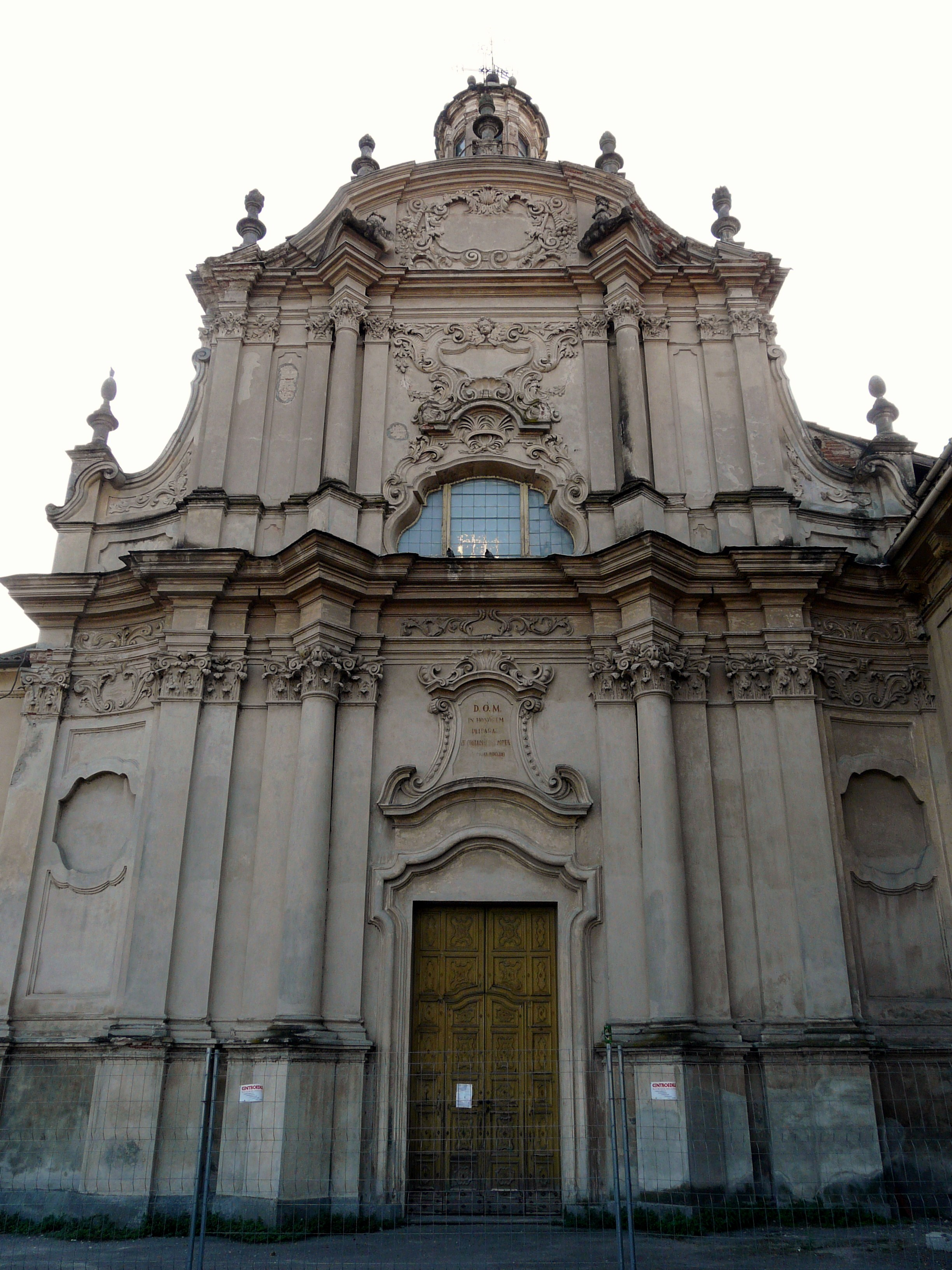
Facade from the front

== History ==
This church was erected for Dominican nuns and consecrated in 1726. The architect was Giacomo Zanetti using designs by Giovanni Battista Scapitta. The highly decorated facade is close to the elliptical dome. The interiors were frescoed by Giovanni Carlo Aliberti who painted the Saints and Allegories of the Virtues, while the dome was painted by lesser-known painters Benaschi and Vittore. The statue of the Virgin of the Assumption (1780) on the main altar was sculpted by Giovanni Battista Bernero.

An association dedicated to the restoration of the church is active in 2016.

== See also ==
- 18th-century Western domes
