= Giacomo Zanetti =

Italian master builder and architect

Giacomo Zanetti (c.1696–1735), born probably in Lugano, was an Italian master builder and architect active in Casale Monferrato.

He was responsible for some of the most interesting baroque buildings constructed in the town during the years following the House of Savoy's 1708 acquisition of the Duchy of Montferrat from the Gonzagas and the incorporation of the former capital into the state of Piedmont-Sardinia. He completed the two most successful buildings of Giovanni Battista Scapitta, following the architect's death in 1715: Palazzo Gozzani di Treville (in Via Mameli; designed in 1711) and the rebuilding of the convent church of Santa Caterina, Casale Monferrato (consecrated in 1726). He also worked on the Palazzi Sannazzaro (Via Mameli), Magnocavalli (Via Mameli), Ardizzone (Via Palestro) and Palazzo Grisella di Rosignano (Via Garibaldi).

Giacomo Zanetti died at Casale in 1735.
