= Basilica of La Merced, Quito =

Coordinates: 0.2182°S 78.5137°W

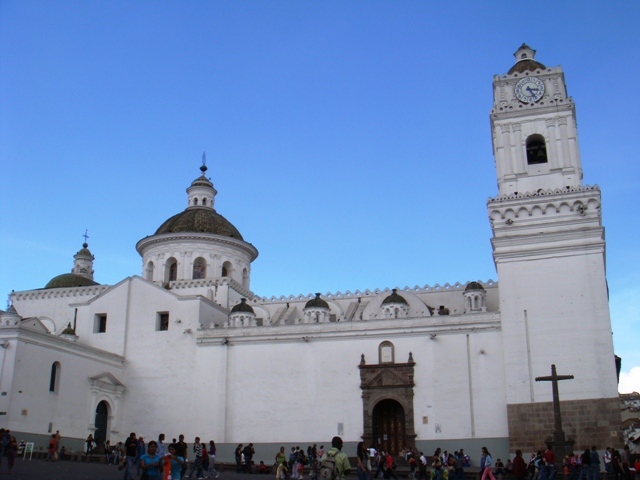
Facade of the Basilica of La Merced

The Basilica of Nuestra Señora de la Merced, is a Catholic temple located in the Historic Center of the city of Quito, capital of Ecuador. It is the first church and headquarters of the Mercedarian Order in the country, and for this reason it bears the title of Basilica.

The white building has five domes, a square tower and is decorated with Inca and Arabic inscriptions. Construction began in 1701, the tower was completed in 1736, and the basilica was consecrated in 1737. The architect was José Jaime Ortiz. The main altarpiece was carved and built by Bernardo de Legarda between 1748 and 1751. The sacristy behind the chancel is a work from the early 19th century. In its sacristy as well as inside the Church, there are several works by the artist Víctor Mideros.

It maintains one of the most important historical libraries in the city, both for its content and for its state of conservation. The library of La Merced unfolds on two floors of the north wing of the Convent and has access through the lower floor, as well as the upper one. Bookcases line the walls of both floors and are linked inside by a beautiful carved wooden spiral staircase. According to the inventory and cataloging carried out during the Library Conservation Project from 1994 to 1997, 22,000 volumes and more than 40,000 bibliographic records were counted.

The Merced Library Conservation Project was financed by the Getty Conservation Institute and managed by the Caspicara Foundation of Quito. The Director of the Project was the renowned Document and Paper Restorer Marcos Rivadeneira Silva in the conservation area and Ángel Oleas in the Cataloging area.

== People that rest in the Convent ==
In its vaults rest, among other illustrious characters, the following:

- Isabel de Santiago, outstanding painter of the 17th century.
- Juan Pío de Montúfar y Frasso, first Marquis of Selva Alegre and 22nd President of Quito.
- Rosa de Larrea-Zurbano y Santa Coloma, first marchioness consort of Selva Alegre.
- Jacinto Sánchez de Orellana, second Marquis of Villa de Orellana and mayor of the colonial Cabildo of Quito.
- Isidoro Barriga, hero of South American independence and second husband of the Marchioness of Solanda.

== Gallery ==
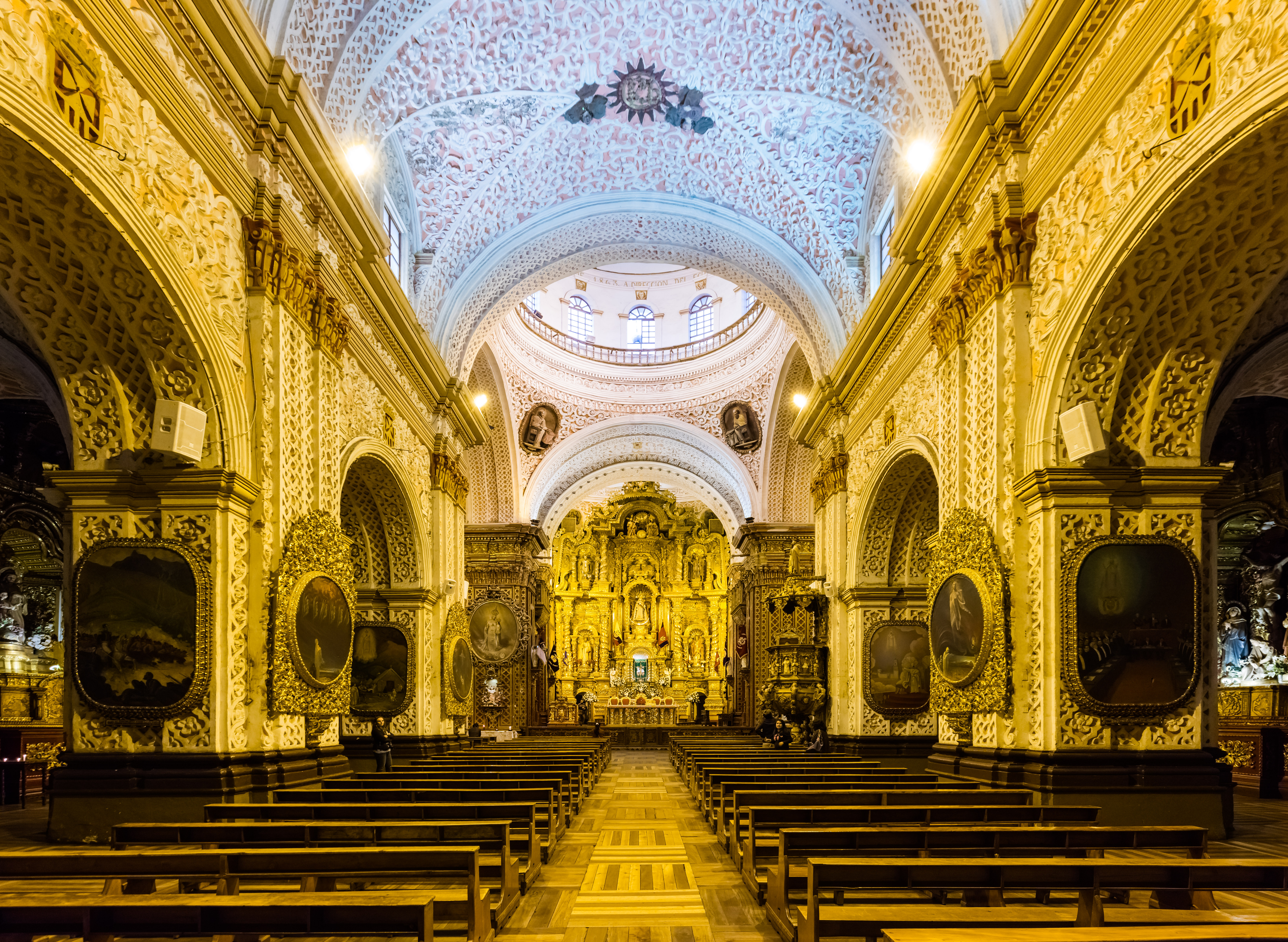
Main nave

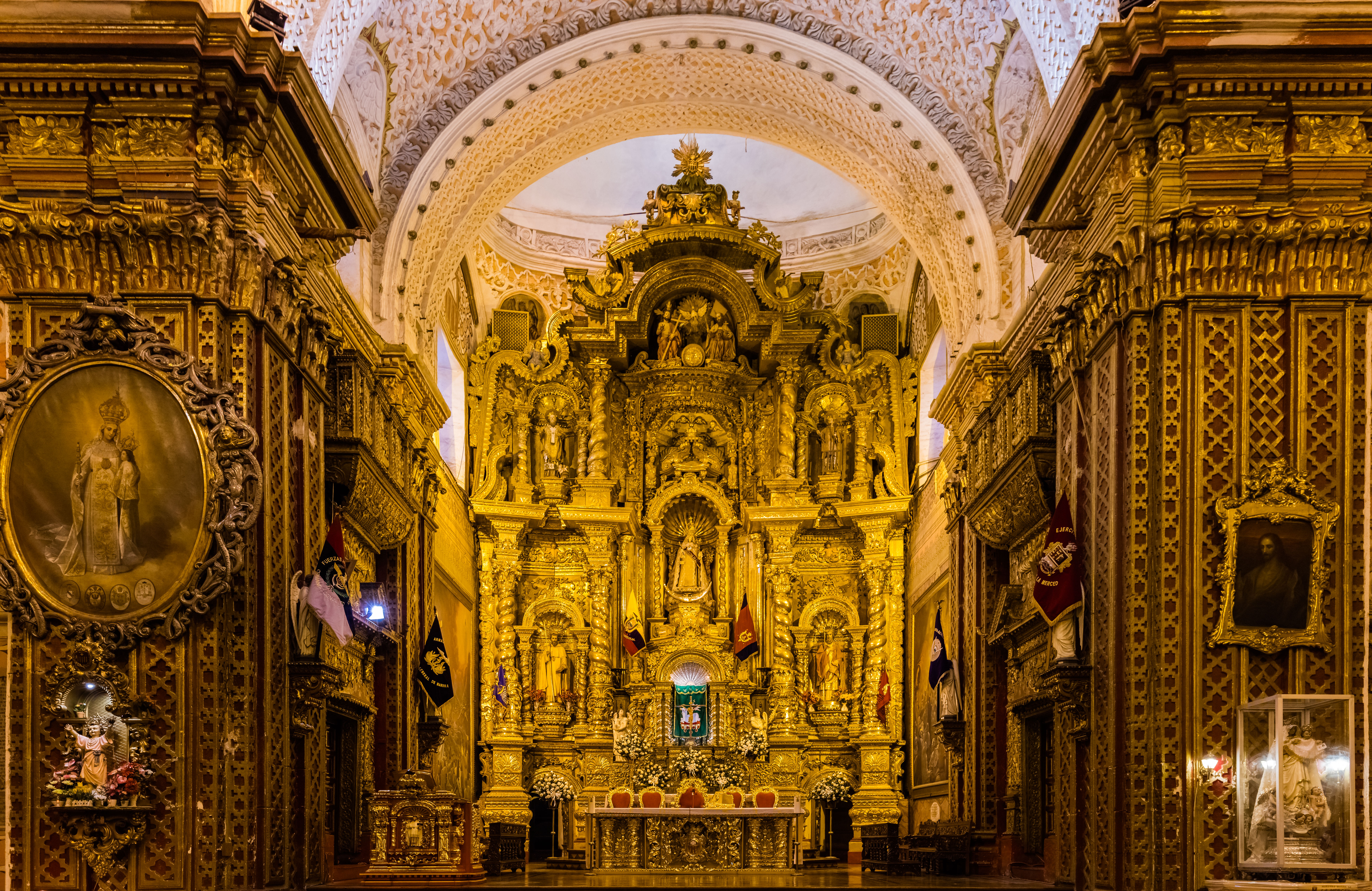
Altarpiece

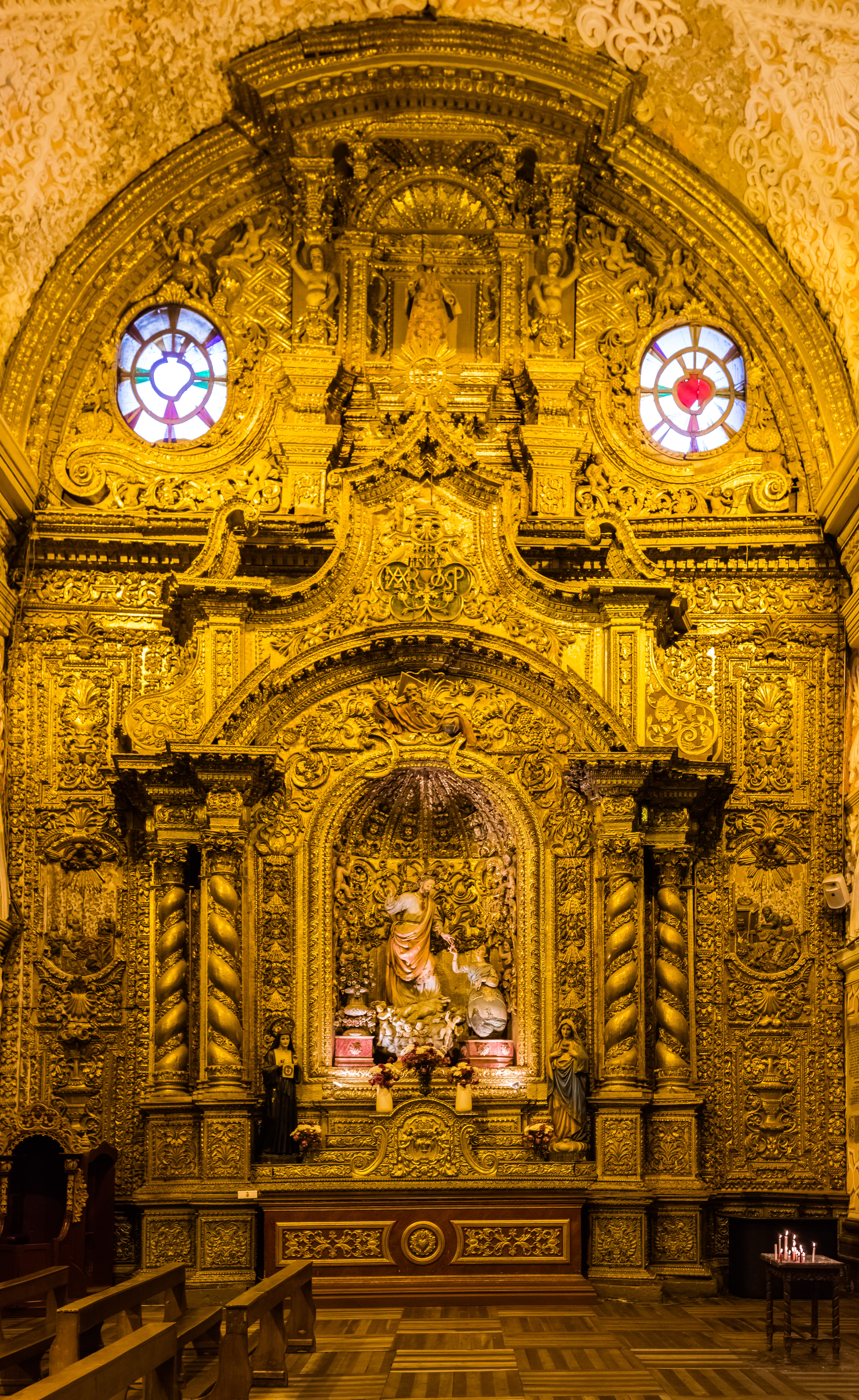
A reredos

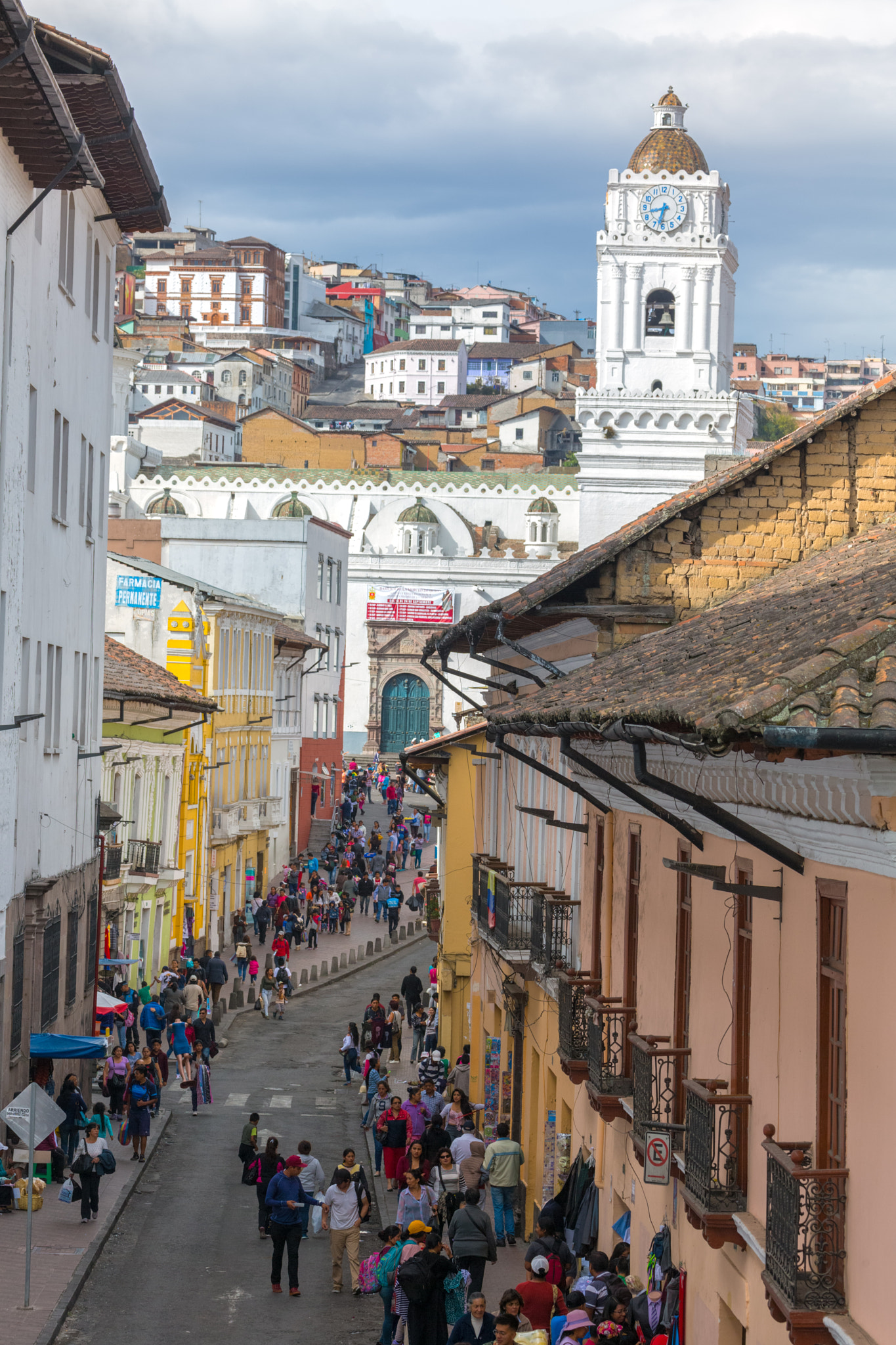
Far view of the basilica

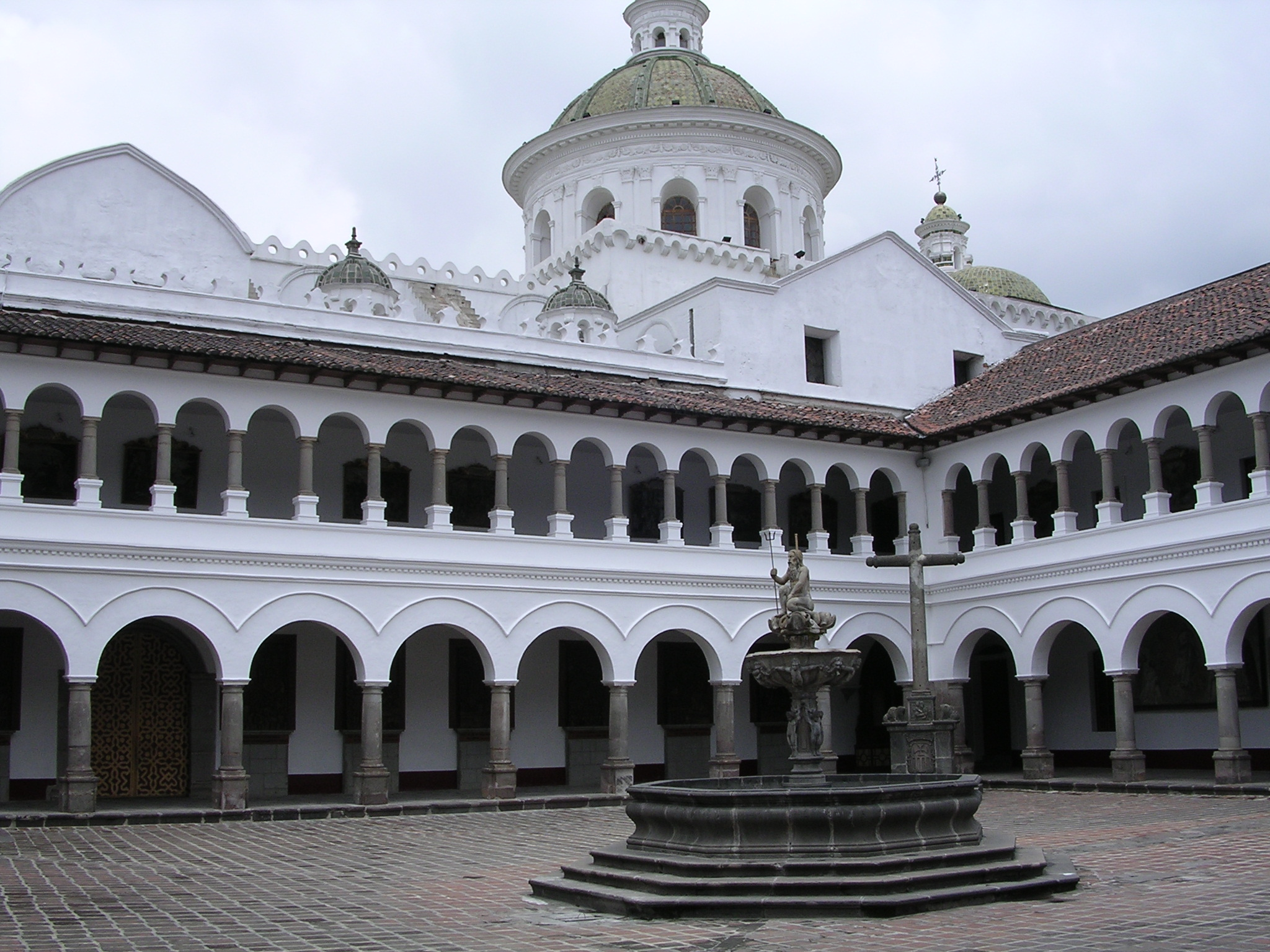
Cloister of the convent

== See also ==
- List of buildings in Quito
- 18th-century Western domes
