= Obořiště =

- Municipality
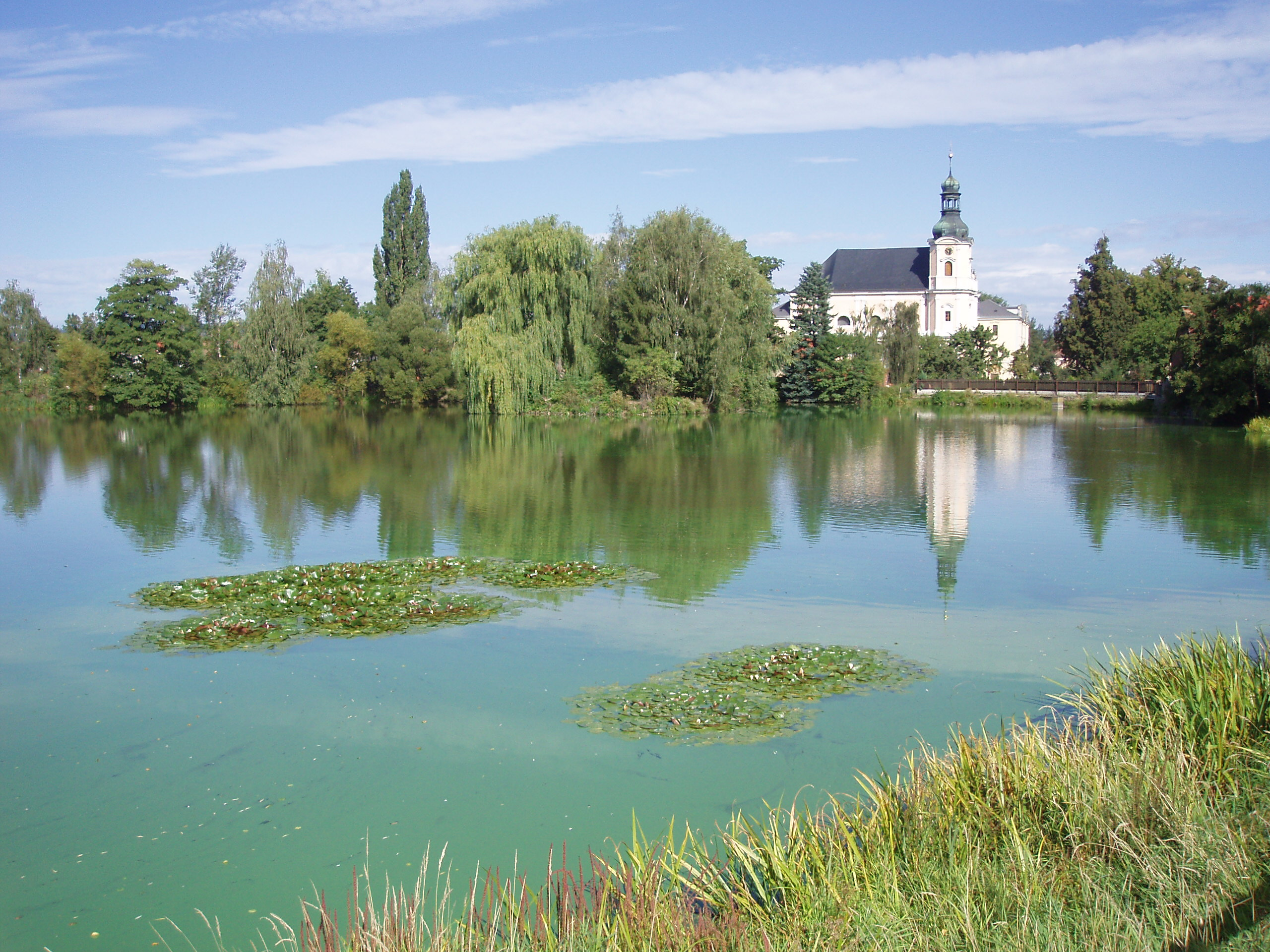
- Příkop pond and the Church of Saint Joseph

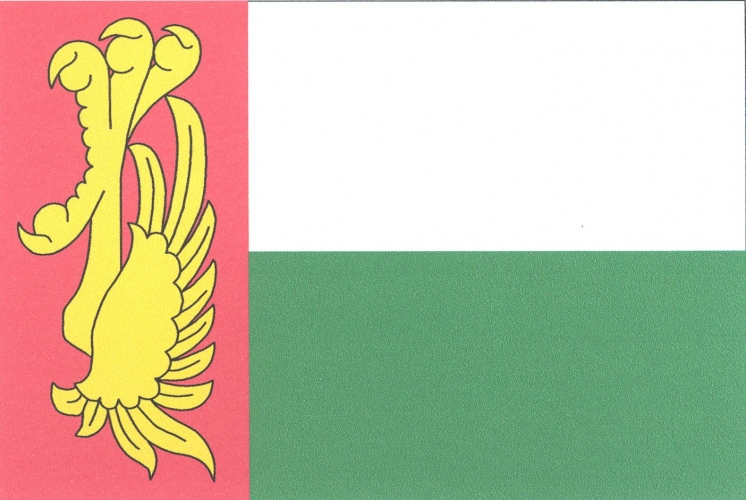
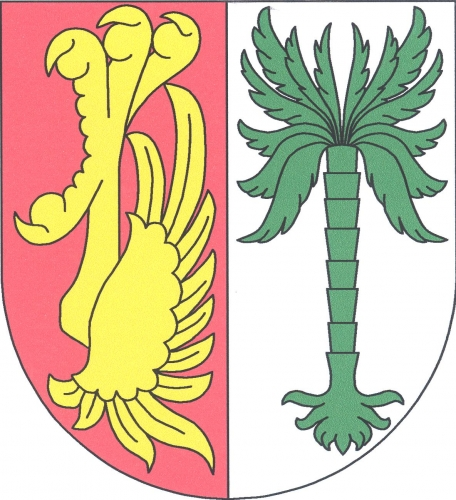
- Flag Coat of arms

- Location in the Czech Republic
- Coordinates: 49°44′32″N 14°9′7″E
- Country: Czech Republic
- Region: Central Bohemian
- District: Příbram
- First mentioned: 1333

Area
  - Total: 7.61 km^{2} (2.94 sq mi)
- Elevation: 373 m (1,224 ft)

Population (2026-01-01)
  - Total: 721
  - Density: 94.7/km^{2} (245/sq mi)
- Time zone: UTC+1 (CET)
  - Summer (DST): UTC+2 (CEST)
- Postal codes: 262 12
- Website: obecoboriste.cz

Obořiště is a municipality and village in Příbram District in the Central Bohemian Region of the Czech Republic. It has about 700 inhabitants.

== Administrative division ==
Obořiště consists of two municipal parts (in brackets population according to the 2021 census):

- Obořiště (660)
- Lhotka (53)

== Etymology ==
The name is derived from the Czech word obora ('game reserve').

== Geography ==
Obořiště is located about 11 kilometres (7 mi) northeast of Příbram and 36 km (22 mi) southwest of Prague. Most of the municipality lies in the Benešov Uplands, only a small part in the south extends into the Brdy Highlands and includes the highest point of Obořiště, the hill Na Vrších at 442 m (1,450 ft) above sea level. There are several fishponds in the municipal territory, including Příkop in the centre of the village.

== History ==
The first written mention of Obořiště is from 1333. From 1675 to 1680, the village was owned by Prague bishop Tomáš Pešina of Čechorod, who bequeathed it to the Order of Saint Paul the First Hermit. The order founded here a monastery, but it was abolished in 1786 and Obořiště was acquired by the royal chamber. The last owners before the establishment of the independent municipality in 1850 were the family of Colloredo-Mansfeld.

== Demographics ==
Historical population

Year	Pop.	±%
1869	570	—
1880	635	+11.4%
1890	685	+7.9%
1900	687	+0.3%
1910	711	+3.5%

Year	Pop.	±%
1921	711	+0.0%
1930	721	+1.4%
1950	553	−23.3%
1961	600	+8.5%
1970	564	−6.0%

Year	Pop.	±%
1980	619	+9.8%
1991	587	−5.2%
2001	567	−3.4%
2011	628	+10.8%
2021	713	+13.5%

Source: Censuses

== Transport ==
The D4 motorway from Prague to Písek runs through the municipality.

== Sights ==
The main landmark of Obořiště is the Baroque complex of the former monastery with the Church of Saint Joseph. The college was built in 1681–1688 and the church, probably according to the design by the architect Christoph Dientzenhofer, was built in 1701–1711.
