= Giovanni Battista Scapitta =

Italian architect and engineer

Giovanni Battista Scapitta (1653-1715) was an Italian architect and engineer of the late Baroque period in Northern Italy. He was born in Moncalvo. He helped design the church of Santa Caterina, Casale Monferrato.

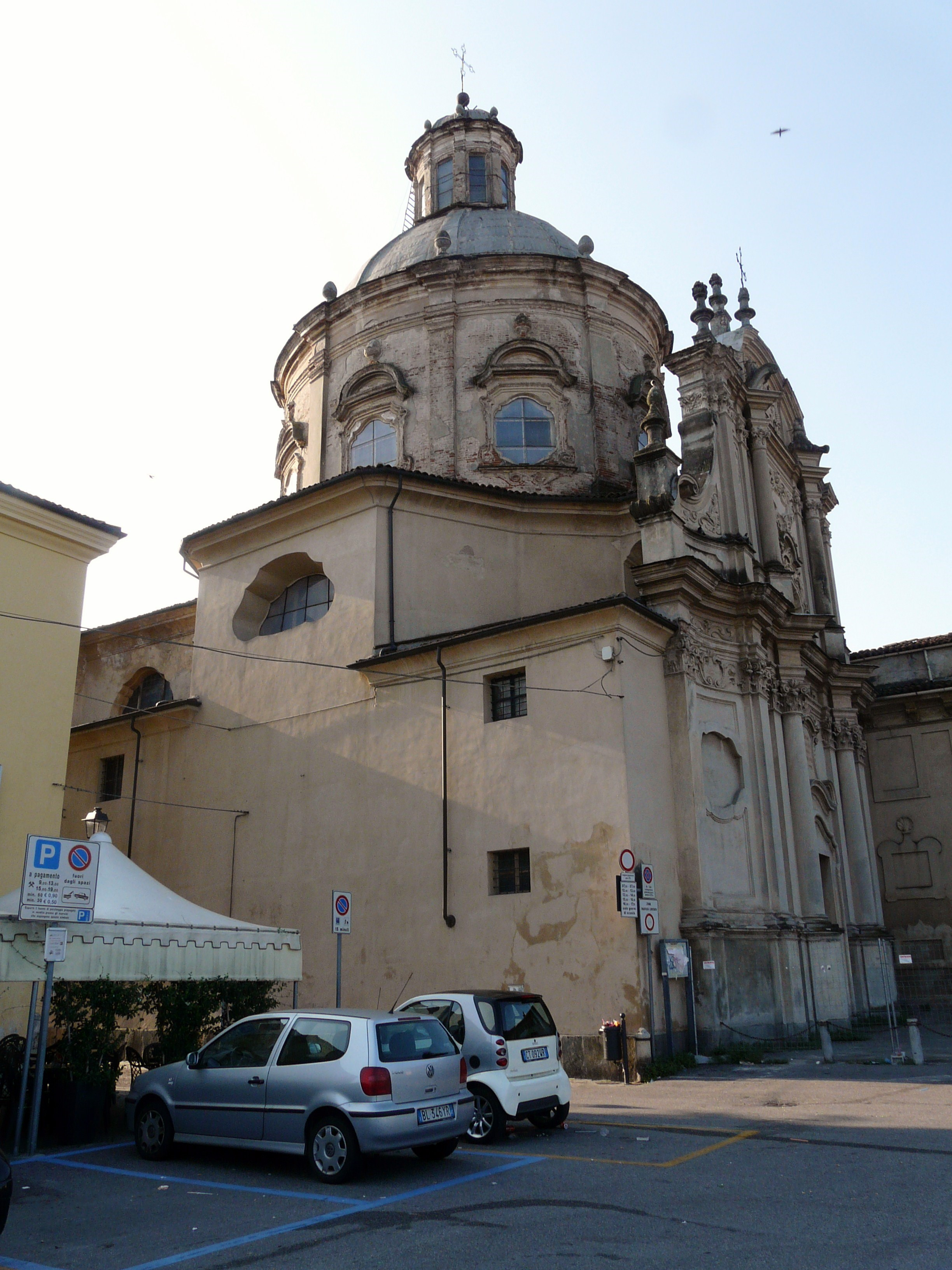
Side view of façade with dome

One of his most influential designs would turn out to be his spa design for what is now known as the Antiche Terme of Acqui Terme in the Piedmont. In 1679, a landslide damaged the medieval bath facilities in the town. The ill-fated Duke Carlo Ferdinando of Mantua commissioned Scapitta and the Regia Fabbrica to build new public baths for the thermal waters. The design resembled that of a monastery, with two cloisters around open air pools. The male cloisters had bedrooms: the first floor was reserved for military men. The cloister for women had a chapel dedicated to San Guido, patron of the town.
