= Agriculture in Malawi =

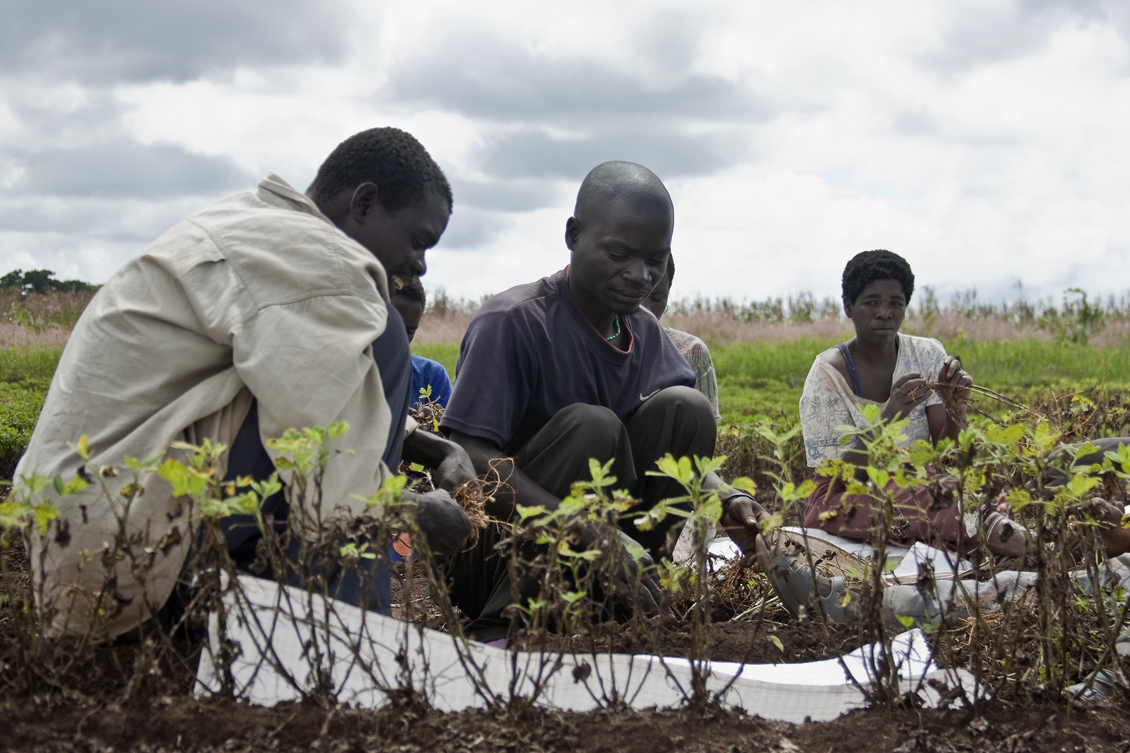
Harvesting groundnuts at an agricultural research station in Malawi

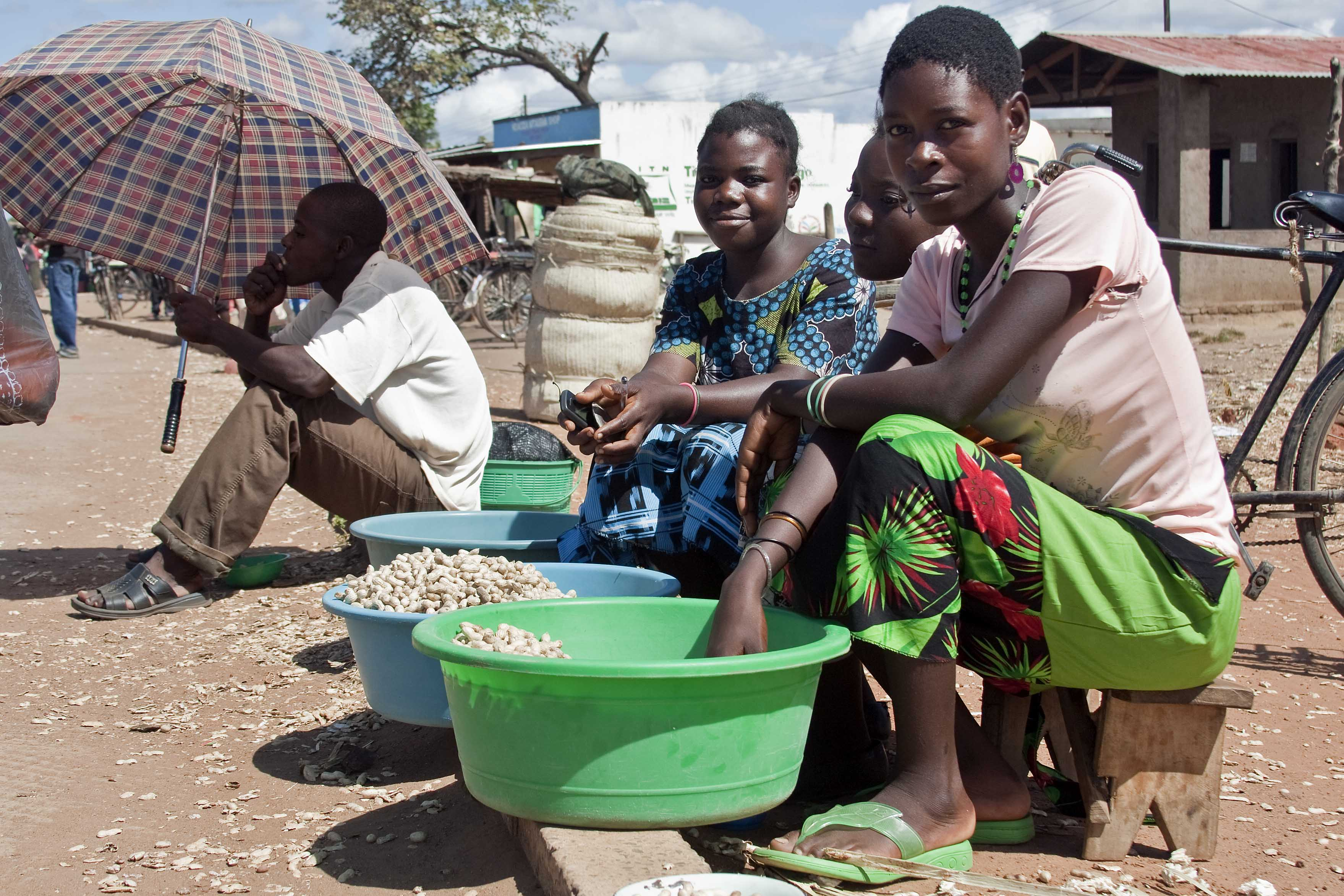
Women in Salima District, Malawi, selling groundnuts

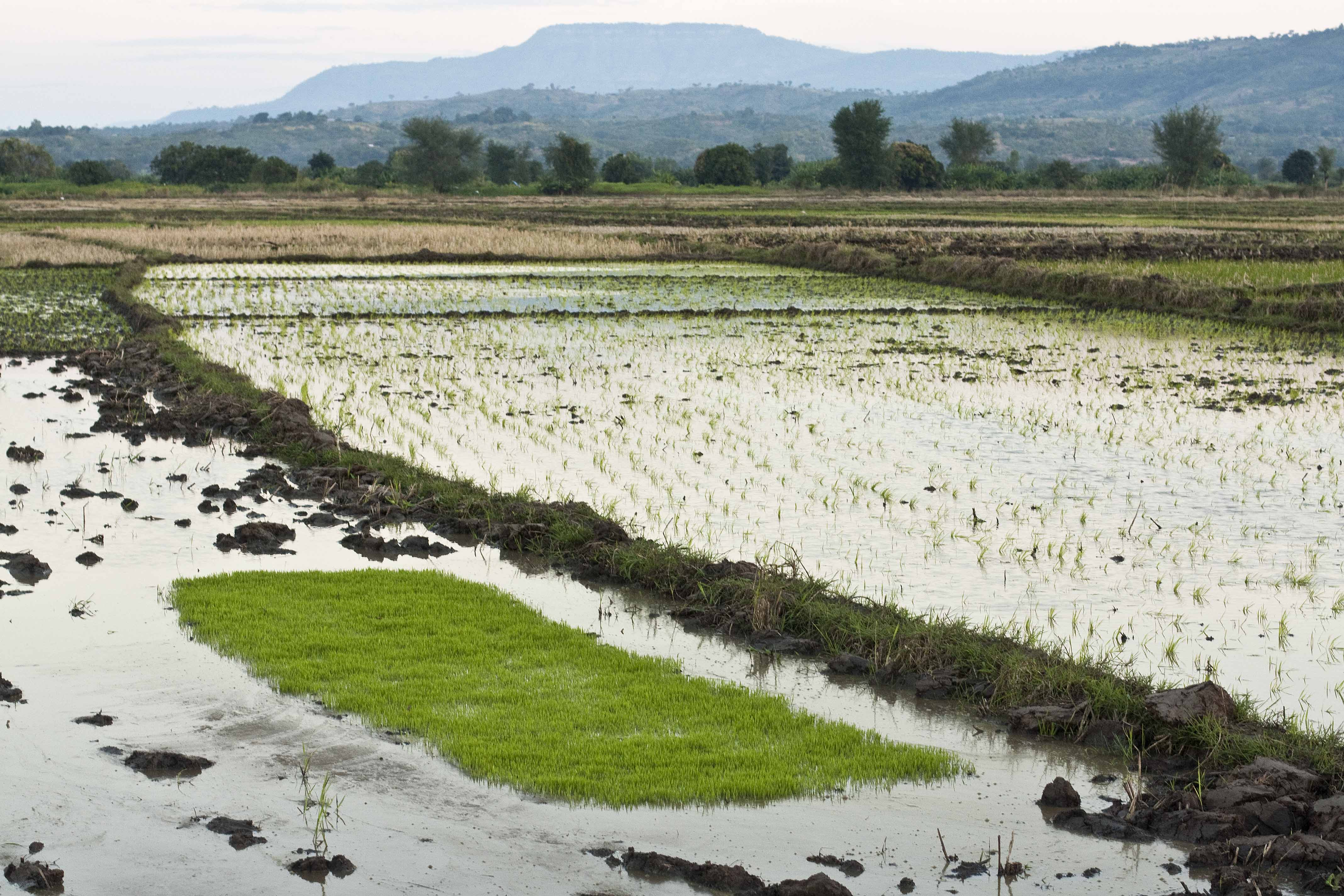
Rice fields in Karonga

The main economic products of Malawi are tobacco, tea, cotton, groundnuts, sugar and coffee. These have been among the main cash crops for the last century, but tobacco has become increasingly predominant in the last quarter-century, with a production in 2011 of 175,000 tonnes. Over the last century, tea and groundnuts have increased in relative importance while cotton has decreased. The main food crops are maize, cassava, sweet potatoes, sorghum, bananas, rice, and Irish potatoes and cattle, sheep and goats are raised. The main industries deal with agricultural processing of tobacco, tea and sugar and timber products. The industrial production growth rate is estimated at 10% (2009).

== History of agriculture in Malawi ==
=== Colonial period ===
Although Nyasaland, as the country was known before 1964, had some mineral resources, particularly coal, these were exploited in colonial times. Without economic mineral resources, the protectorate's economy had to be based on agriculture, but in 1907 most of its people were subsistence farmers. In the mid-to-late 19th century, manioc, rice, beans and millet were grown in the Shire Valley, maize, cassava, sweet potatoes and sorghum in the Shire Highlands, and cassava, millet and groundnuts along the shores of Lake Nyasa (now Lake Malawi). These crops continued to be staple foods throughout the colonial period, although with less millet and more maize. Tobacco and a local variety of cotton were grown widely.

Europeans wrongly criticised the practice of shifting cultivation in which trees on the land to be cultivated were cut down and burnt and their ashes dug into the soil to fertilize it. The land was used for a few years after another section of land was cleared. Compared to European, North American and Asian soils many sub-Saharan African soils are low in natural fertility, being poor in nutrients, low in organic matter and liable to erosion. The best cultivation technique for such soils involves 10 to 15 years of fallow between 2 or 3 years of cultivation, the system of shifting cultivation and fallowing that was common in Nyasaland as long as there was sufficient land to practice it. Throughout the protectorate, the colonial Department of Agriculture held negative attitudes towards African agriculture, which it failed to promote and favoured European planter interests. Although in the early years of the 20th century, European estates produced the bulk of exportable cash crops directly, by the 1940s, a large proportion of many of these crops (particularly tobacco) was produced by Africans, either as smallholders on Crown land or as tenants on the estates.

Most people in Nyasaland were subsistence farmers growing maize, millet and other food crops for their own consumption. Its colonial export economy had to be based on growing economic crops, but before 1907 commercial agriculture had hardly started to develop. In pre-colonial times trade was limited to the export of ivory and forest products in exchange for cloth and metals and, for the first few years of the protectorate, ivory and rubber collected from indigenous vines were the principal elements of a tiny export trade. The first estate crop was coffee, grown commercially in quantity from around 1895, but competition from Brazil which flooded the world markets by 1905 and droughts led to its decline in favour of tobacco and cotton. Both these crops had previously been grown in small quantities, but the decline of coffee prompted planters to turn to tobacco in the Shire Highlands and cotton in the Shire Valley. Tea was also first planted commercially in 1905 in the Shire Highlands, but significant development of tobacco and tea growing only took place after the opening of the Shire Highlands Railway in 1908.

In the early years of the 20th century, European estates produced the bulk of exportable cash crops directly, but by the 1930s, many of these crops, particularly tobacco and cotton, were produced by Africans, either as smallholders on Crown land or as tenants on the estates. The first estate crop was coffee, grown commercially in quantity from around 1895, but competition from Brazil after 1905 led to its decline in favour of tobacco and cotton. Both these crops had previously been grown in small quantities, but the decline of coffee prompted planters to turn to tobacco in the Shire Highlands and cotton in the Shire River Valley. Tea was also first planted commercially in 1905 in the Shire Highlands, but significant development of tobacco and tea growing only took place after the opening of the Shire Highlands Railway in 1908. During the time of the protectorate, tobacco, tea and cotton were the main export crops, but tea was the only one that remained an estate crop throughout. The main barriers to increasing exports were the high costs of transport from Nyasaland to the coast the poor quality of much of the produce and, for African farmers, the planters’ opposition to them growing cotton or tobacco in competition with the estates.

The area of flue-cured tobacco farmed by European planters in the Shire Highlands rose from 1,800 to 5,700 hectares (4,500 to 14,200 acres) between 1911 and 1920, yielding 2,500 tonnes of tobacco. Before 1920, only about 5% of the crop sold was dark-fired tobacco produced by African farmers, but this rose to 14% by 1924. The First World War boosted the production of tobacco, but post-war competition from United States Virginia adversely affected Nyasaland growers. Much of the tobacco produced by the European estates was a low-grade, and the decline in flue-cured tobacco intensified throughout the 1920s. Europeans produced 86% of Malawi's tobacco in 1924, 57% in 1927, 28% in 1933, but only 16% in 1936. Despite this decline, tobacco still accounted for 65-80% of exports in the years from 1921 to 1932. Formation of a Native Tobacco Board in 1926 stimulated production of fire-cured tobacco. By 1935, 70% of the national tobacco crop was grown in the Central Province where the board had around 30,000 registered growers. At first, these farmed Crown land (also called Native Trust Land), but later estates contracted sharecropping “Visiting Tenants”. The number of growers expanded after the Second World War, so by 1950 there were over 104,500 growers planting 53,000 hectares (132,000 acres) and growing 10,000 tons of tobacco; only 15,000 were in the Southern Province. About three-quarters were smallholders, the rest estate tenants. Numbers declined later, but there were still 70,000 in 1965, producing 12,000 tons.

Egyptian cotton was first grown commercially by African smallholders in the upper Shire valley in 1903 and spread to the lower Shire valley and the shores of Lake Nyasa. By 1905 American Upland cotton was grown on estates in the Shire Highlands. African-grown cotton was bought by The British Central Africa Company Ltd and the African Lakes Corporation until 1912 when government cotton markets were established where a fairer price for cotton was given. After reckless planting on unsuitable land, consolidation of the planted area to 4,000 hectares (10,000 acres) and improving quality increased cotton exports to a peak of 44% of total exports in 1917 when the First World Was stimulated demand. A shortage of manpower caused a post-war drop in production, with no recovery until 1924, but then reaching 2,700 tons in 1932 and a record of 4,000 tons exported in 1935. This was mainly African production in the lower Shire valley, as output from European estates became insignificant. The relative importance of cotton exports dropped from 16% of the total in 1922 to 5% in 1932, then rallied to 10% in 1941, falling to 7% in 1951. The quality of cotton produced improved from the 1950s with stricter controls on pests and, although 80% of the crop continued to be grown in the lower Shire valley, it also began to be grown in the northern shore of Lake Malawi. Production varied widely, and increasing amounts were used domestically, but at independence cotton was only the fourth most valuable export crop.

Tea was first exported from Nyasaland in 1904 after tea plantations were established in the high rainfall areas of Mlanje District, later extended into Cholo District. Exports steadily increased at first, and the importance of tea increased dramatically after 1934, from only 6% of total exports in 1932 to over 20% in 1935. It never fell below that level, rising to over 40% from 1938 to 1942, and in the three years 1955, 1957 and 1960 the value of tea exports exceeded that of tobacco and until the mid-1960s, Nyasaland had the most extensive area of tea cultivation in Africa. Despite its value to the protectorate's economy, the main problem with its tea on the international market was its low quality.

Groundnut exports were insignificant before 1951 when they amounted to 316 tons, but a government scheme to promote their cultivation and better prices led to a rapid increase in the mid-to-late 1950s. At independence, the annual exports totalled 25,000 tons and groundnuts became Nyasaland's third most valuable export. They are also widely grown for food. In the 1930s and 1940s, Nyasaland became a major producer of Tung oil and over 8,000 hectares (20,000 acres) on estates in the Shire Highlands were planted with Tung trees. However, after 1953, world prices declined and production dropped as Tung oil was replaced by cheaper petrochemical substitutes. Until the 1949 famine, maize was not exported but a government scheme then promoted it as a cash crop and 38,500 tons were exported in 1955. By independence, local demand had reduced exports to virtually nil.

The basis of estate agriculture in Nyasaland for much of the colonial period was the system of thangata which, in the early colonial period, meant that African on estates had to perform agricultural labour in lieu of the rent for a plot of land on which they could grow food. At first, estates usually required two months’ labour a year from adult men, one month for rent, the second for Hut tax. However, on some estates the obligations of labour tenants were extended. The demand for estate labour declined in the 1920s, and British Central Africa Company was the first estate owner to modify thangata. The company issued seed to African tenants so that they could grow cotton or tobacco under supervision, and then sell their crops to the company at low prices. The Natives on Private Estates Ordinance 1928 formalised this arrangement by allowing landlords to receive rents in cash, in a fixed quantity of acceptable crops or by direct labour. The term thangata applied both to rent in kind, common on tobacco and cotton estates, and to the older form of labour thangata, which persisted on the tea estates that required direct labour.

By 1946, those estate companies that had formerly relied on labour tenants for their workforce complained that thangata was virtually unenforceable, as the workers ignored their contracts with impunity and refused to pay rent. A proposed rent increase in 1953 led to further resistance, and riots in August 1953, leading to eleven dead and seventy-two injured. Following these riots, the Governor Colby urged that estate land should be acquired through voluntary purchase, and the colonial administration purchased 142,000 hectares by 1954. At independence in 1964, only 171,000 hectares of estates remained, mostly tea plantations.

=== After independence ===
At independence in 1964, the cultivable area of Malawi was estimated at 3.42 million hectares (net of the remaining estates), about 90% of which was cultivated. Most of the land in Malawi suitable for farming food crops was available at the time of independence to Malawians without an obligation to pay cash rent or provide labour services. From 1950 to the mid-1980s, Malawi exported substantial amounts of maize. Initially, this was the result of a policy change to promoting maize as a cash crop after the 1949 famine, but it continued despite later indecision on whether such surpluses should be promoted. Smallholders’ estimated average yields from local maize rose from 0.6 tonne a hectare in the 1950s to 0.8 tonne a hectare in the 1960s, then to 1.2 tonnes a hectare (1.8 tonnes with moderate fertilizer) in the 1980s. Up to the mid-1980s, Malawi was a net maize exporter; its agricultural growth rate was 6% a year between 1973 and 1982.

From approximately 1950 to 1980 Malawi enjoyed adequate and reliable rains. Food security seemed assured and consumption exceeded production only in five years in this period, none leading to serious shortages. This supported the dual agricultural policy, developed since 1961 by Hastings Banda, first as agriculture minister, later president, of securing food self-sufficiency through smallholder maize production and promoting cash crops, particularly tobacco on estates. However, this apparently successful dual policy faltered in the late 1970s. Banda retained control over agricultural policies as Prime Minister in 1964 and president from 1966 to 1994, so its successes or failures were primarily his. Banda recognised Malawi had few resources other than agriculture. He at first favoured smallholder agriculture, as few European-owned estates remained. However, the policy of growing Burley tobacco on estates was developed from 1968. Burley tobacco is a fairly inexpensive air-cured variety used as a filler for certain cigarettes im contrast to the more expensive flue-cured variety. In 1966, President Banda argued that customary land tenure was insecure and inhibited investment. The Customary Land Development Act, 1967 allowed the creation of agricultural leases of up to 99 years over Customary Land. Many in the Central Region were intended to grow Burley tobacco and controlled by Banda himself, or senior officials and politicians.

There were 229 mostly European-owned estates of 79,000 hectares in 1970, but 14,355 of 759,000 hectares in 1989 and their final area exceeded a million hectares. Only about 25% of the land was used in a four-year tobacco cultivation rotation. Many estates became insolvent, despite easy credit and were foreclosed by the parastatal banks. When estates were formed, former residents lost their Customary Land rights and left or became estate labourers or tenants. There were 51,000 agricultural workers (mostly on tea estates) in 1968, 181,000 in 1980 and 200,000 in 1990. Tenants replaced employees later and 675,000 estate tenants were registered in 1990 and 580,000 “squatters” lived on surplus land as a low-paid casual labour pool. Few grew all their food but relied on rations or purchases. This occupation of land by inefficient tobacco estates undermined food security.

With more intensive agricultural use, the amounts and duration of fallow were progressively reduced in more populous areas. A situation approaching continuous mono-cropping developed on many Malawian smallholdings, which placed soil fertility under gradually increasing pressure Maize monocropping without fallow or fertiliser leads to reduced yields, but even so, up to 1982 it was estimated that Malawi had sufficient arable land to meet the basic food needs of its population, if it were distributed equally. By 1992, cultivation had spread to hillsides and onto steep Rift Valley slopes where it was unsustainable. The area of smallholder maize increased 20% between 1968 and 2000 by using marginal land. Many rural smallholdings were less than two hectares in the 1960s: by the mid-1980s the average plot was hardly more than one hectare.

Throughout most of the 20th century Malawi's main food crop was maize and at the end of that century, 90% of its grain was maize, which provided 56% of all calories consumed. Malawi was the world's most maize-dependent country, except for Zambia. Its traditional substitutes were cassava on the Lakeshore and sweet potatoes in the Shire floodplain. The estimated area of maize cultivation increased from around 1.3 million hectares in 1980 to over 1.6 million hectares in 2000. However, maize harvests began to fluctuate widely, from highs of about 1.5 million tonnes in 1989 and about 1.3.million tonnes in 1990 to lows of about 0.6 million tonnes and about 1994 and 0.8 million tonnes in 1992. In view of the fluctuation in maize harvests, from the 1990s crops of sweet potatoes and cassava increased the result of USAID projects to promote drought-resistant foods.

The area of cassava planted is estimated to have increased from 72,000 hectares in 1990 to over 200,000 hectares in 2001, with estimated output increasing from 168,000 tonnes in 1990 to 3.4 million tonnes in 2001. The area of sweet potatoes planted is estimated to have increased from 43,000 hectares to over 192,000 hectares between 1990 and 2001, while estimated output increased from 177,000 tonnes to 3.4 million tonnes over the same period. There is some disagreement about the magnitude of this increase, but they suggest that maize is no longer the most important crop by tonnage, although it still accounts for 60% of the area of food planted.

Despite a collapse in tobacco prices in 1979, The World Bank thought growing Burley tobacco by smallholders would relieve poverty by allowing farmers to buy imported cheap maize for food. From 1987, market liberalisation allowed smallholder to grow Burley, and they could only sell it freely in 1996173. The richest 25% of smallholders earned significant amounts from Burley after liberalisation. Malawi's Burley production increased from 45,600 tonnes, all estate-grown, in 1988 to 142,200 tonnes (including 98,600 tonnes grown by smallholders) in 2000. It grew 10% of world Burley in 1992, but the market started to decline and the US dollar price of Malawian Burley halved between 1988 and 2000; its lower grades were unsaleable. Detailed surveys estimated that in 2000 10% of Malawi's rural households grew Burley tobacco using 3% of cultivable land each year. In the four-year cycle, and including the estates growing it, Burley tied-up 300,000 hectares of land that could have been used for maize, when the areas of maize plantings were some 1.6 to 1.7 million hectares. Households with sufficient land, labour, fertilizer and credit for both food and tobacco achieved only modest returns but were vulnerable to price fluctuations and bad weather. Burley was not the solution to Malawi's problems.

Malawi currently has a food gap equivalent to 500,000 to 600,000 tonnes a year of maize. Attempts have been made to close this gap with other foods, but the two most likely ways to close it are either to import large quantities of maize or grow more maize. Paying for maize imports reduces Malawi's foreign currency reserves to very low levels and creates very high level of debt, and growing more maize would require massive investment.

Some projects promoted legumes as an alternative to maize grown with purchased fertilizer, Soils, Food and Healthy Communities (SFHC), a participatory project in Ekwendeni in Mzimba District, began in 2000 with 30 farmers testing whether grain and perennial legumes such as groundnuts and soya beans could improve soil fertility, food security and nutrition. One of its founders, Esther Lupafya, was then maternal and child health coordinator at Ekwendeni Hospital had seen child malnutrition rise from 1994, as chemical fertilizer became unaffordable for poor farmers. Raj Patel who has worked with the project, reported that soil fertility and harvests improved for some of the poorest women in the project village of Bwabwa in the early 2000s, but child malnutrition remained high. Interviews with participating farmers revealed domestic violence and unequal division of labour, and the project added work on gender relations alongside its farming trials. From 2012 the Malawi Farmer-to-Farmer Agroecology project run by SFHC and Ekwendeni Hospital with Malawian, Canadian and American universities extended this farmer-to-farmer teaching to Dedza District in central Malawi.

== Agricultural marketing ==
=== Colonial period ===
The declared objectives of colonial Malawi's legislation on the production and marketing of economic crops were to increase the quantity and improve the quality of the crops, and to stabilise the income of farmers through periods of price fluctuation. However, rather than promotion, restrictions were imposed on the number of African smallholder growers and their output by registration schemes, fixing producer prices, licensing buyers and exporters and establishing commodity boards, which often had exclusive responsibility for crop production and marketing. These restrictions did not apply to the production and marketing of the crops grown on European-owned estates. The use of marketing controls allowed the Nyasaland government to increase its revenues. By offering smallholders prices that were lower than the world market prices, the colonial state indirectly taxed the smallholders, extracting large parts of their profits. Market regulations were extended food crops after the Second World War, and by the mid-1950s marketing boards controlled the trade of most African small holder produce.

Regulations introduced for tobacco in 1926 and cotton in 1934 required the registration of African peasant growers, and a Native Tobacco Board (later renamed the African Tobacco Board) was created. Settler demands for the regulation of the peasant tobacco and cotton sectors were partly motivated by fears that profitable smallholder farming could reduce the availability of cheap African labour for their estates. The formation of the Native Tobacco Board stimulated African production in the Central Region, but registered growers paid heavily for it. At first, the board charged a levy of thirty pence a hundred pounds of tobacco, 10% of the price it paid growers. In 1930, this was raised to one third of the price paid to meet increased costs. In the Second World War and after the board recovered its costs and underpaid growers, retaining between 25% and 35% of the auction prices obtained to meet costs equal to only 15% to 20% of those prices.

A Maize Control Board was formed in 1947. It was supposed to ensure that Malawi's maize supplies were maintained and to guarantee minimum prices to farmers, but it was hampered by lack of funds and its objectives were unattainable with the organisation it had. To cover the cost of a country-wide network, the board fixed a very low buying price and sold maize at double this price. These low prices discouraged farmers from growing maize commercially, and inhibited the development of grain markets. The quantities of maize available for the home market dropped significantly at a time of growing demand caused by poor harvests in the run up to the major famine in 1949. After the 1949 famine, the MCB promoted maize production, but when world prices fell in the 1950s, it abandoned the import and export trade, and the Nyasaland administration discouraged maize production in agriculturally unsuitable areas.

In 1952, an African Produce and Marketing Board (later renamed the Agricultural Production and Marketing Board) was created with control over the marketing of African produce including maize, beans, peas, wheat, groundnuts, rice, sorghum millet, cassava and cotton seed. In 1956, the activities, powers and duties of the Maize Control, African Tobacco and Cotton Control boards were transferred to the Agricultural Production and Marketing Board. It had powers to buy smallholder surpluses, but its producer prices were biased against peasant producers and did not reflect the rise in living costs: they were so unsatisfactory that even settlers on the Legislative Council called for the revision of the board's pricing policy.

When Dr Hastings Banda became agriculture minister in 1961, these policies were little changed. The Agricultural Production and Marketing Board was replaced by the Farmers Marketing Board (FMB) in 1962, and European Board members were replaced by growers’ representatives. The Farmers Marketing Board was given wide powers to buy, sell and process farm products, promote price stability and subsidise seed and fertilizer.

=== After independence ===
During the first years after independence in 1964, Banda and the governing Malawi Congress Party actively supported the smallholder farming sector, as few European-owned estates remained. Banda recognised Malawi had few resources other than agriculture. He was an interventionist, and Farmers Marketing Board became an aggressive purchaser of smallholders’ produce. However, disappointing smallholder production and the development of a policy of growing Burley tobacco on estates caused the government to transfer land to the estate sector. The activities of the FMB were widened to include participation in business ventures, and accumulate investment funds, competition in marketing African food crops was restricted and the monopoly strengthened.

In 1971, the FMB was replaced by the Agricultural Development and Marketing Corporation (ADMARC). ADMARC was given the new power to assist any public or private organization with capital, credit or other resources in any projects relating to the economic development of Malawi. Its objectives were to increase the volume of exportable economic crops and improve their quality, to promote the consumption of Malawian agricultural produce abroad and to support smallholder farmers. It took over the FMB monopolies over maize, tobacco and cotton, and its powers to fix prices, operate markets and supply credit. Smallholders supported ADMARC's high operating costs and much of its profits came from underpaying them, but it only re-invested 5% of funds in smallholder farms. Transferring resources away from smallholders to the state led to corruption and abuse of office. ADMARC subsidised tobacco estates and other businesses, and by the mid-1980s, it diverted two-thirds of its income into these estates. The main beneficiaries of this strategy were the political elite who controlled the tobacco estates food and ADMARC employees. In 1979, when tobacco prices collapsed, it was threatened by liquidity problems, and by 1985, it was insolvent.

From 1971, ADMARC subsidised fertilizer for every farmer, but tobacco estates benefited most, as tobacco needed more fertilizer than maize. Estates also had access to credit without which few smallholders could afford even subsidised fertilizer. The Malawi government agreed to partially privatise it to obtain World Bank loans, but the World Bank required a phased elimination of fertilizer subsidies. A complete withdrawal of subsidies prevented 75% of smallholders buying fertilizer in 1988–89, so temporary subsidies were provided up to 1994–95. The partial privatisation left ADMARC with limited funds to supply fertilizer and seed to smallholders, and the closure of many of its depots hindered distribution. An increase in maize producer prices in 1988 did not compensate farmers who had previously grown hybrid maize for their lost subsidies, so many reverted to growing local maize without fertilizer. ADMARC's weakness led to increased consumer prices, reduced food security and a food crisis in 1991–(93).

After the World Bank inspired partial privatisation in 1987, ADMARC was short of funds to provide services. Despite market liberalisation, few private traders emerged, and maize markets were disrupted and Malawi became increasingly dependent on imported maize. The World Bank criticised the losses it made on imported maize, and in 1996, it required the creation of an agency independent of government influence to control grain imports. ADMARC kept control over domestic grain and started selling the domestic reserves to meet its debts. ADMARC continued selling its reserves in 2000, and in 2001 despite a poor harvest. The failure to prevent food shortages caused deaths from hunger and related diseases, mainly in 2002.

The World Bank disliked ADMARC being under political control and proposed that it should only keep its core agricultural marketing operations and only provide marketing services in those outlying areas of the country with limited private sector competition: these reforms were implemented from 2006 on. The private sector lacked the capacity to provide competitive marketing services. It was unable to store enough of grain to meet food needs in the lean season, unwilling to buy maize from smallholders in remote rural areas and without the capacity to import sufficient maize during national shortfalls to maintain prices. As Malawian maize markets did not act competitively, state intervention through ADMARC was needed, and it remained as a residual buyer and seller. At the peak of liberalisation in 2002–03, there were only 180 ADMARC outlets. By 2009–10, the number of ADMARC-operated markets had grown to 788, and in 2010–11 the figure rose to 904. It remains under the control of politicians, and this has led to claims of corruption and the public perception that ADMARC does not act in the best interests of those it is meant to assist. ADMARC expanded in the decade after 2002 and still exists because of the failure of the agro-dealer programme to create an efficient private sector marketing system.

The International Monetary Fund (IMF), World Trade Organization (WTO), and Group of Eight (G8) were all actively interested and involved with the Malawi case. To create a stable economy and a government which the first world can work with the IMF employed SAPs (Structural Adjustment Policies) to restructure the country. This interjection by so many global organizations show how the period from 1990 - 2012 was one of neo-colonialism. These global institutions primarily follow the guidance and objectives of the first world. Malawi demonstrates the "economic imperialism". which these institutions created. The infrastructures employed through SAPs are modified to insure dependency on the first world and create a distinction between the levels of development. The restrictions of power put on Malawi eliminated rhea prosperity of the middle class. No real transfer of power to legitimate African authorities has ever been conducted since the end of colonialism. which consistently undermines the real interests of the state. The Colonialism Reparations movement emphasize the neo-colonist regime which is taking place in Malawi and other African states. It is a movement which is increasing in its legitimacy throughout the world.

== Food shortages ==
=== Pre-colonial and colonial periods ===
Seasonal hunger was common in pre-colonial and early colonial times, and gave rise to several coping strategies such as growing secondary crops like millet or sweet potatoes in case the maize crop failed, gathering wild food or relying on support from family or friends. In a purely peasant economy, farmers grow food primarily for their families’ needs. They normally have only small surpluses to store or for sale and little money to buy food in a time of shortage, even if it was available in any market. There were no significant markets, as any surplus grain not stored would be bartered for livestock or passed to dependents. If drought coincided with warfare, famine could be catastrophic, as in the great 1861-63 famine in southern Malawi, when 90% of the population of some villages died of starvation or disease, or through war. However, seasonal shortages occurred in most years and droughts ever six years on average. The imposition of colonial rule itself caused local food shortages, sometimes amounting to famine, where villages were burned and cattle killed. There were several significant famine in the first half of the 20th century, including one in the lower valley of the Shire River, an area which frequently experienced shortages, in 1903. Low rainfall in 1900–01, 1918 and 1920–21 and 1922 caused severe drought in the south and centre of the country, while in 1926 crops were destroyed by flooding. There was also distress in the north nearKasungu in 1924-25 and around Mzimba in 1938, and the shores of Lake Malawi suffered food shortages almost annually in the 1930s. However, for the first 50 years of colonial rule, much of the country fared better that the drier areas of southern Tanganyika, eastern Northern Rhodesia or Mozambique, where famine was endemic. The colonial authorities also provided some famine relief by moving maize from districts with surpluses to those with shortages and making free issues to children, the old and destitute, but they were reluctant to issue free relief to the able-bodied. After the great famine ended in 1863, despite regular seasonal hunger and high levels of chronic malnutrition, as well as acute episodes of food shortage and famine, there was no "famine that kills" until 1949.

Markets where food was exchangeable for cash were established during the colonial era, although, as long Malawi as was largely agricultural, its markets remained rudimentary. It is likely that introduction of a market economy eroded several pre-colonial survival strategies and eventually created an underclass of the chronically malnourished poor. However, some coping strategies were in use up to the 1950s, including growing secondary crops like millet or sweet potatoes in case the maize crop failed, gathering wild food or relying on support from family or friends. The older strategies were supplemented by the use of cash to make good food deficits, whether it was earned directly, remitted by a migrant worker relative or borrowed. Many families could grow sufficient food for normal subsistence; other rural families contained the “traditional” poor. These include the aged, disabled and widows as well as some female-headed families that were unable to cultivate sufficient land for their families’ subsistence. However, the ranks of impoverished female-headed families were swelled by families of absent migrant workers if they did not receive cash remittances, a new and non-traditional group of the poor. Insecure rent-paying tenant families or sharecroppers required to concentrate on farming economic crops might lack land for subsistence cultivation, face the economic drains of paying rent and taxes or receive an inadequate payment for their produce, leaving them vulnerable to food insecurity. It is probable that rapid social and economic changes took place in Central and East Africa in the late pre-colonial and early colonial periods. Some individuals found new opportunities to increase their wealth and status, but others (particularly women) lost a degree of their former security and became marginalised.

The 1949 famine was centered on the Shire Highlands and around the shores of Lake Malawi and, as the last major famine in this area was in 1926, it was unexpected and unprepared for. The rains failed in December and again in March: the worst affected areas had less than half their normal rain. The maize crop was only 65 to 70% of the normal harvests of 1950 and 1951 and was preceded by two quite poor harvests, which reduced smallholders’ reserves. Government and mission employees, many urban workers and some estate tenants received free or subsidised food or food on credit, but those less able to cope and those already in poverty suffered most. Traditionally, rural women in Nyasaland shared food with their neighbours and distant relatives, and this continued in the early stages of the 1949 famine. However, as it progressed, food was only shared with close family members, not remoter relatives, and the old, the young and widows, deserted wives or the wives of absent migrant workers were excluded from food sharing. The term “ganyu" originally meant the food or beer given to neighbours in appreciation of their help with agricultural tasks. However, its use as the term for the work a poor person did for food or cash for more prosperous neighbours arose in the mid-1950s, in response to the 1949-50 famine. In 1949 and 1950, 25,000 tons of food were imported to counteract the famine, although initial deliveries were delayed. The official mortality figure was 100 to 200 deaths, but the true number of may have been higher, and there was severe food shortage and hunger in 1949 and 1950. A detailed study of this famine concluded that large areas of uncultivated land on private estates in the Shire Highlands were not available to African cultivators, who lived on overcrowded Crown Land, where growing tobacco competed with food crops, creating food insecurity. The formation if a Maize Control Board, established in 1947 may also have worsened the situation. Although it was set up to guarantee minimum prices, even in years of surpluses and paying the same prices in remote areas as in accessible ones, it hoped to create a grain reserve against famine. However, when it was set up, most Malawian families grew their own food, and the few urban and plantation workers could be supplied locally. This, and the Maize Control Board's policy of keeping prices low through concerns about over-producing maize inhibited commercial grain markets developing. Its first years of operation, 1947 and 1948 coincided with poor harvests, and in those years it bought a less than half its estimated requirements in those years. Following the famine, the production of tobacco in the affected areas decreased and Maize Control Board prices for maize were increased. The Maize Control Board had purchased just over 7,000 tons if maize in 1948: its successors purchased 30,000 tons in 1964 and 128,000 tons in 1979, showing that Malawi's maize trade was under-developed in 1949.

=== After independence ===
No famines occurred for over forty years after 1949: from approximately 1950 to 1980 Malawi, like much of inter-tropical Africa, enjoyed adequate and reliable rains. Food security seemed assured: the only years when consumption exceeded production were in 1963, 1970, 1975, 1976 and 1980 and none were as serious as 1949 or later shortages. In 1961, in the approach to independence, the colonial-era marketing boards were replaced by the Farmers Marketing Board with wide powers to buy, sell and process farm products, promote price stability and subsidise seed and fertilizer prices. Before 1969, it made no profits from its purchasing monopoly, but after this the Farmers Marketing Board and its successor, the Agricultural Development and Marketing Corporation (ADMARC), created in 1971, profited significantly. Smallholders had to support the high operating costs of ADMARC, much of whose income came from underpaying them. ADMARC only re-invested 5% of funds in smallholder farms, but subsidised tobacco estates, so that by the mid-1980s, it diverted two-thirds of its income to estates. Until 1979, it had sound finances: when tobacco prices collapsed, its lack of liquidity threatened its main creditors, Malawi's two commercial banks. From 1980, Malawi's rainfall tended to decrease and fall for shorter periods. As its rural population grew, food production only exceeded consumption in 1993 and annual maize consumption fell from 240 kilos in the 1960s to 160 kilos in the 1990s: this deficiency was only remedied by large increases in the root crop harvest after 1995. There was a paradox: Malawi's maize exports indicated food sufficiency, but increasing malnutrition did not.

Smallholders were discouraged from growing tobacco in favour of maize. Growing maize as a cash crop requires reasonable sale prices, low input costs (particularly fertilizer) and farmers having some financial reserves. Farm incomes were declining by 1976 and, from 1981 to 1986, the real value of Malawi maize producer prices fell to 40% to 60% of those of other Central and East African states. Even with low fertilizer prices, maize growing was difficult. From 1971, ADMARC subsidised fertilizer prices for every farmer. Estates benefited most, as tobacco needs more fertilizer than maize, and few smallholders could buy enough fertilizer, even if subsidised. After 1985, declining world tobacco prices and supporting the estates made ADMARC insolvent. The Malawi government agreed to partially privatise it to obtain World Bank loans, which required a phased but complete elimination of fertilizer subsidies. These subsidies decreased from 30.5% in 1983–84 to nothing in 1988–89, which prevented most smallholders from buying fertilizer. Between 1989–90 and 1994–95, subsidies were twice restored and twice removed. Privatisation left ADMARC short of funds to supply fertilizer and seed to smallholders, and it was unable to give credit. All these factors increased the possibility of food shortages and lessened the ability of government or smallholders to cope with them. After its privatisation, ADMARC had to support Mozambican refugees, who numbered over 500,000 by 1988, but it could not replenish its stocks from the poor harvests of the late 1980s. Cassava pests, rare before 1987, severely depleted this main alternative to maize. It only needed a significant fall in rainfall to cause a crisis.

Malawi's rainfall in 1989-90 and 1990-91 was at best moderate and locally poor. Smallholder food reserves were depleted before the deeper crisis in 1991–92. Rainfall before planting in 1991 was low and sporadic; withdrawing fertilizer subsidies made a poor harvest poorer. Only 40% of the normal maize crop was gathered in 1992. The famines of the 1990s represent exceptional food shortfalls within longer periods of increasing shortages. Although rainfall or agricultural output data do exist for 1991 and 1992, there are few contemporary accounts of a 1992 famine. This is because President Banda suppressed discussion about food insecurity and information on malnutrition. After he was voted from office a better-documented drought occurred in 1993–94. J Milner, (2004). Agriculture and Rural Development in Malawi: the Role of Policies and Policy Processes, p 42. There are no generally available or accepted figure for famine deaths in 1992. Apart from the lack of rainfall, the main causes of famine in the 1990s include the state regulation of agriculture and the distortions caused by diverting resources to inefficient estates and failure to support smallholders growing food crops. This intensified pressure on food-growing land without providing an alternative way for poorer Malawians to earn a living' as ADMARC failed to pay reasonable prices for the crops that farmers had to grow. Although the withdrawal of fertilizer subsidies exacerbated agricultural decline, its seeds lay in government policies since 1968 or earlier. Many poorer tenants and squatters relied on food-for-work arrangements or casual paid labour on the estates to supplement the limited food they could grow, and this short-term rural casual work paid for in kind called ganyu became a way of life for an increasing number of poorer Malawians.

After erratic rainfall and poor harvests in 1997 and 1998 maize stocks were low and consumer prices: ADMARC had to release reserves and import maize to prevent famine. However, both the 1999 and 2000 harvests were excellent, at over 2 million tonnes of maize, with large sweet potato and cassava crops. However, it appeared that Southern Africa was entering a decade of subnormal rains and 1997 and 1998 were a foretaste of this. The harvests of 2001, 2002 and 2003 were disappointing, that of 2004 was severely deficient in maize and in root crops; the next satisfactory harvest was in 2005. Average rainfall was light in the 2000–01 and 2003–04 growing seasons, locally high in 2001–02 and 2002–03: it was characterised by too much or too little rain at the wrong time or place. Between 2001 and 2004, Malawi produced more food in than in 1992 or 1994, but as its population was much higher, more maize had to be imported, and difficulty obtaining imports created internal food shortages in these years. Rural poverty increased and by 2005, about 14% of Malawian adult were HIV positive. Disabilities and deaths from AIDS may have discouraged growing labour-intensive tobacco or maize in favour of cassava, reducing family incomes and coping resources.

Poor families were those with less than one hectare of land, or whose adults consumed less than 200 kilos of maize each year; they formed 55% of the population in 1989, including most smallholders. This included 20% of families with less than half a hectare or adults eating less than 133 kilos of maize (the ultra-poor). By 2003, 72% were poor, 41% ultra-poor: many were estate labourers or tenants, or in female-headed households. Many were malnourished, consuming only 1,818 daily calories (1,165 calories for the ultra-poor). Families with half a hectare or less relied on casual labouring (often food-for-work, termed "ganyu") and with those dispossessed by estate formation made up a virtually landless underclass. In congested parts of the Shire Highlands, the poorest 65% had only 0.2 hectare. As 95% of all suitable, and some marginal, land was already cultivated, land shortages could only intensify. Labour and fertilizer shortages or costs prevented poor households from growing Burley tobacco. For these, market liberalisation removed the safety net that subsidies had previously given. As fertilizer costs increased, in poor years the earnings of many smaller Burley growers did not meet the costs of production or allow purchases of extra food. Most tobacco growers reserved only 0.3 to 0.5 hectare to grow food, insufficient for family needs in some years.

After the 1992 famine, foreign aid was made conditional on re-establishing political liberalisation. The privatised ADMARC received limited state funding to create a Strategic Grain Reserve of 180,000 tonnes to stabilise prices for farmers and consumers and had to use commercial loans to import large quantities of maize each year in the 1990s. From 1997, after criticism from the World Bank that ADMARC was subsidising imports of maize, ADMARC lost responsibility for this, controlling only domestically produced grain. The Malawi government required it to buy domestic maize at a fixed minimum price to support farmers, and this forced ADMARC to sell its strategic reserve in 1997, and again in 2000 to pay off its commercial loans, creating insecurity.

Although universal fertilizer subsidies had been abolished in 1995, the Malawi government arranged for 2.86 million smallholders to receive free Starter Packs both in 1998 and 1999. Each contained enough hybrid maize seed and fertilizer to plant 0.1 hectare and produce between 125 and 175 kilos of maize, enough to feed a family for a month. Perhaps unfortunately, the 1999 and 2000 harvests were good and foreign aid donors criticised the scheme which, although it added an estimated 499,000 tonnes and 354,000 tonnes respectively to those two maize harvests, did not target only the poorest smallholders, and cost as much for each pack as the market value of the maize produced. A Targeted Inputs Programme (TIP) of maize seed and a little fertilizer was aimed at the very poor in 2001 and 2002, but 1.5 million TIP packs each year produced little maize because they were issued too late in the planting season. Although Starter Packs had been withdrawn just before these two years of poor harvests, delays and bad weather were the main causes of food shortages not reducing pack numbers or content.

Malawi was increasingly dependent on imported maize in deficit years, but ADMARC had started selling domestic reserves in 2000, the year after a good harvest, but continued in 2001: some maize was exported at low prices. Failure to prevent food shortages is shown by estimated deaths from hunger and related diseases', for which there was a credible report of over 1,000 deaths, compared to the 100 to 200 estimated for 1949. Although 1992 famine deaths were not fully reported, they were probably far less than in 2002. The IMF identified four main areas for improving food security: improving transparency by external audit, removing price distortions and reducing costs. However, the biggest threat to food security was Malawi's reliance on maize, not a drought-resistant crop.

Following a bad maize harvest in 2005, almost five million of Malawi's 13 million people needed emergency food aid during the Malawian food crisis. Bingu wa Mutharika, Malawi's newly elected president, decided to subsidize agricultural inputs such as fertilizer by reinstating and increasing fertilizer subsidies despite skepticism from the United States and Britain.

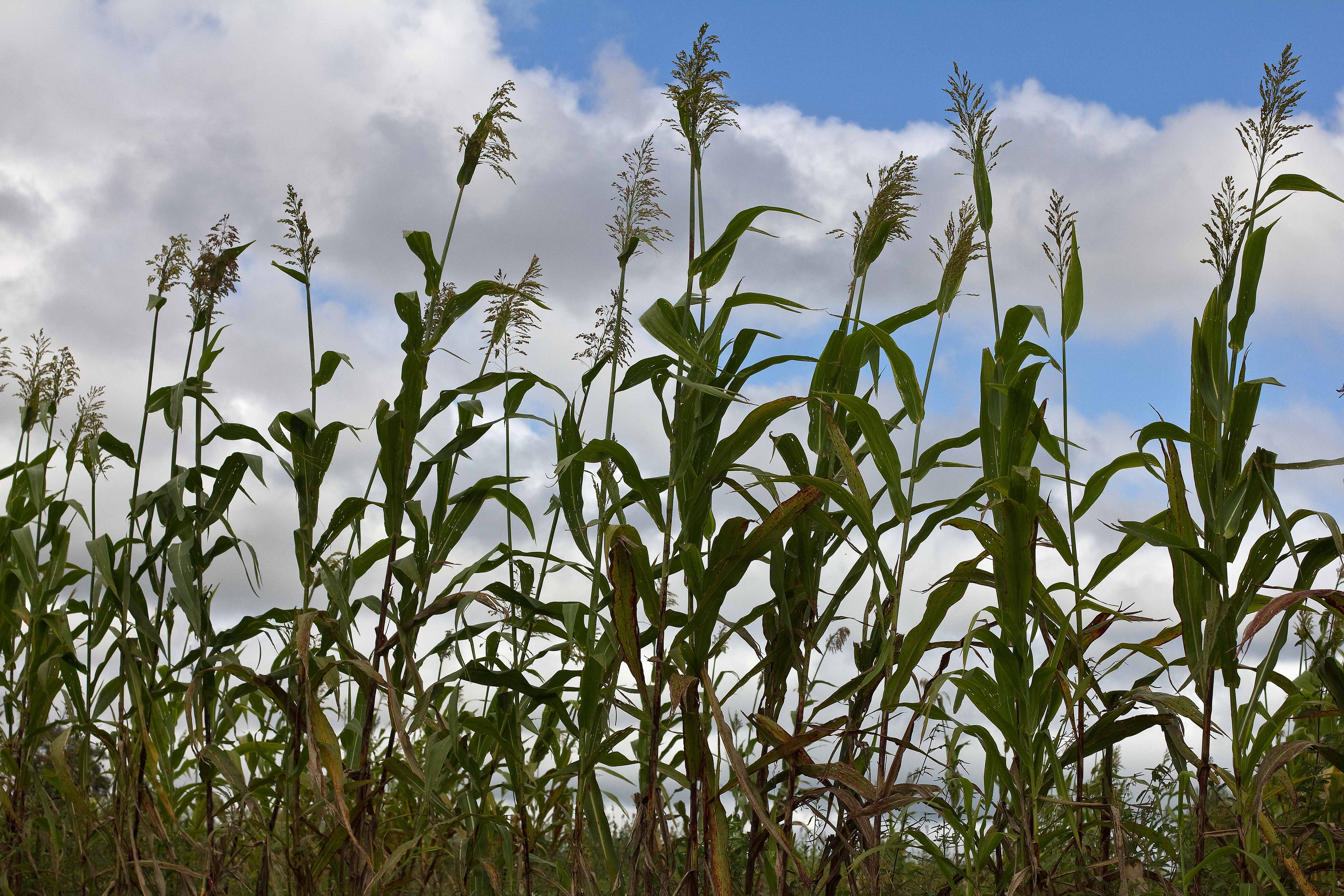
A local Malawian variety of sorghum

Malawi's soil is depleted, like that of other local countries. Many of its farmers could not afford fertilizer at the then-current market prices. Bingu wa Mutharika declared he did not get elected to rule a nation of beggars. After initially failing to persuade the World Bank and other donors to help subsidize green revolution inputs, the president decided to spend $58 million from Malawi's own reserves to provide seeds and fertilizers to the poorest farmers. The World Bank eventually endorsed a scheme to allow the poorest 1.3 million farm families to buy three kilograms of hybrid maize and two 50-kilogram bags of fertilizer at a third of the market price. Following a bumper harvest in 2007, Malawi sold more maize to the World Food Programme of the United Nations than any other southern Africa country, and exported hundreds of thousands of tons of corn to Zimbabwe. The success of these subsidies caused some re-examination of the role of agriculture in helping poor in Africa, and of government investment in basic components of farming, such as fertilizer, improved seed, farmer education, credit and agricultural research. Despite this, the UN Food and Agriculture Agency recorded that in the period 2010–12, 23.1% of the population were under-nourished, almost the same percentage was recorded for the whole period from 2004 to 2009, and only a slight fall from the 26.8% in 1999-2001

Although Malawi enjoyed ample rains in early 2011 and a good harvest, long spells of dry weather in January and February 2012 caused reduced food crop production in parts of central and southern Malawi, which resulted in food deficits in poor households in the areas affected, requiring humanitarian support from December 2012. These food deficits required the release of 47,600 tonnes of maize from the government Strategic Grain Reserve.

== See also ==
- University of Malawi, Bunda College of Agriculture
- Agricultural Development and Marketing Corporation
- Malawian cuisine
