= Native Tobacco Board =

The Native Tobacco Board, or NTB, (later renamed the African Tobacco Board) was formed in Nyasaland in 1926 as a Government-sponsored body with the primary aim of controlling the production of tobacco by African smallholders and generating revenues for the government, and the secondary aim of increasing the volume and quality of tobacco exports. At the time of its formation, much of Nyasaland's tobacco was produced on European-owned estates, whose owners demanded protection against African tobacco production that might compete with their own, and against the possibility that profitable smallholder farming would draw cheap African labour away from their estates. From around 1940, the aim of the NTB was less about restricting African tobacco production and more about generating governmental revenues, supposedly for development but still involving the diversion of resources away from smallholder farming. In 1956, the activities, powers and duties of what had by then been renamed the African Tobacco Board were transferred to the Agricultural Production and Marketing Board, which had powers to buy smallholder surpluses of tobacco, maize, cotton and other crops, but whose producer prices continued to be biased against peasant producers.

== Tobacco in Nyasaland ==
Nyasaland’s African farmers had long grown local varieties of tobacco but the cultivation of Virginia (or Brightleaf) varieties by Europeans began at the end of the 19th century, and tobacco became a favoured crop on European estates in the Shire Highlands from the second decade of the 20th century. The areas farmed rose from 4,507 acres in 1911 to 14,218 acres in 1920 and the bulk of the crop was cured by the flue-curing process, which involved curing tobacco in curing barns where it is heated but not exposed to smoke. Before 1920, only about 5% of the crop marketed was dark-fired tobacco, where curing exposed the tobacco to smoke: this was produced by African farmers, but this rose to 14% by 1923. The First World War boosted the production of European-farmed Virginia leaf, but much of Virginia tobacco produced by Nyasaland’s estates was of low grade and suffered from post-war competition from United States production. The decline in flue-cured tobacco intensified throughout the 1920s. Europeans produced 86% of Nyasaland’s tobacco in 1924, 57% in 1927, 28% in 1933, but only 16% in 1936. Total tobacco production fell from 15.5 million to just 10.3 million pounds between 1924 and 1929 and the number of white tobacco farmers fell from 229 to 82 between 1919 and 1935. Many European estate owners who had previously grown tobacco themselves moved to a system of encouraging African tenant farmers to rent estate land.

== Formation of the NTB ==
By 1930, African smallholders had become the main producers of tobacco, growing mostly fire-cured (or dark-fired) tobacco on Crown Land (also called Native Trust Land). Estate owners began to demand the regulation of peasant tobacco production. In part, this was because it competed with the dark-fired tobacco grown by tenants on their estates, which made up around a quarter of the dark-fired tobacco crop in 1936, and which was used to pay rent in kind to those owners, but also because of fears that profitable smallholder farming would limit the availability of cheap African labour on the estates. Regulations introduced for Tobacco in 1926 required the registration of African peasant growers and created a Native Tobacco Board (NTB - later renamed the African Tobacco Board). This Board operated to protect settler tobacco interests, and its members included several significant estate owners and tobacco producers, and successive Directors of Agriculture acted as its chairmen.

The declared objectives of this legislation were to increase the quantity and improve the quality of the tobacco crop and to stabilise the income of farmers through periods of price fluctuation. However, restrictions were imposed on the number of growers and their output to match production to demand. Growers were registered, producer prices fixed and exporters licensed by the Board, which had exclusive responsibility for crop production and marketing. The use of marketing controls allowed the Nyasaland government to increase its revenues. By offering smallholders prices that were lower than the world market prices, the colonial state indirectly taxed the smallholders, extracting a significant part of their profits.

The formation of the Native Tobacco Board stimulated African production in the Central Region, but registered growers paid heavily for it. At first, the Board charged a levy of thirty pence a hundred pounds of tobacco, 10% of the price it paid growers. In 1930, this was raised to a penny a pound, one third of the price it paid, to meet increased administrative costs. In the Second World War and after, the Board recovered amounts in excess of its costs by underpaying growers, and retained between 25% and 35% of the auction prices it obtained, supposedly to meet its costs, which were, however, equal to only 15% to 20% of the prices it paid.

== The Operation of the NTB ==
=== Pre 1940 ===
At first, the Native Tobacco Board legislation was unpopular with European estate owners, as it failed to protect them completely from competition and resulted in the production of much low-grade tobacco. Some also suggested that Board members were using their position to promote their own interests as landowners to the prejudice of other buyers. Estate owners, including those operating leasehold estate in the Central Region, were able to restrict the number of NTB markets. In 1928, only eight markets were established to serve the whole of Nyasaland, and in 1933 and 1934, five markets were closed as part of a process to restrict peasant cultivation and increase production by African tenants on European-owned estate (who were outside NTB control). By 1935, much of the Central Region was too far from an NTB market for smallholder tobacco production to be viable. In addition, each African grower registered with the NTB was limited to growing half an acre of tobacco. These restrictions remained until 1946.

As the amount of tobacco grown on estates by direct labour decreased in the late 1920s, the demand for labour on the estates also declined as the owners had insufficient work for their labour tenants to meet their rent obligations. The estates were saved from financial collapse when, instead of the owners themselves growing crops using direct labour, they introduced schemes for tenants to grow tobacco and to sell this to the estate owners at fixed, but low, prices. This system was formalised in legislation, the Natives on Private Estates Ordinance 1928, which allowed rents to be paid in cash, by delivering a fixed quantity of acceptable crops or by direct labour. The estates now acted largely as brokers for their tenants’ produce. Tobacco grown by African tenants on estates was outside the Native Tobacco Board scheme.

By 1935, 70% of the national tobacco crop was grown by Africans in the Central Region. In 1930-1931, the Native Tobacco Board had 29,515 registered growers in the Central Region, where it purchased 4.9 million pounds of tobacco. At first, these farmed Crown land, but later leasehold estates were formed, which gave contracts, usually for a single growing season, to sharecropping “Visiting Tenants”. The number of growers varied with demand until the Second World War when it expanded markedly. The Nyasaland administration did not encourage independent peasant tobacco production in the Southern Region where most settler estates were located. The Board had 10,708 growers in this Region in 1930-31, but only 5,767 in 1931-32 partly because of European growers’ opposition. The Board purchased around 200 pounds of tobacco a year from each registered grower, the crop from less than one acre.

=== Post 1940 ===
The Native Tobacco Board was generally disliked by African growers in the 1930s, as it provided poor advice on tobacco growing and underpaid them for their crop. However, from 1940, the growth in demand for tobacco changed the Board’s attitude from one of restricting smallholder production in favour of tobacco grown by African tenants on estates to realising that the growing market could absorb increased smallholder production. In 1946, African members were first appointed to the Board.

Demand for tobacco increased during the Second World War and the immediate post-war years and the sales price of tobacco rose dramatically. In 1944, the Native Tobacco Board paid about 5 pence a pound for tobacco, slightly more in the Central Region than in the South, and sold it for around 8 pence. In 1946, the Board paid 8 pence a pound for average grades of tobacco, which it auctioned at 12 to 18 pence a pound. The main growth in demand was for a light-coloured, mild-flavoured flue-cured leaf suitable for cigarettes, which was difficult to produce in areas of Malawi such as the Shire Highlands with high rainfall. Areas suitable for producing this leaf were in the Central Region. There were over 104,500 growers registered with the Native Tobacco Board in 1950, when they planted 132,000 acres and grew 21 million pounds of tobacco. Numbers of growers declined later, but there were still 70,000 in 1965, registered with the successor of the NTB, and they produced 24 million pounds of tobacco.

In the mid-1940s, some smallholders circumvented the NTB and sold their tobacco to estate owners for better prices than the Board offered. However, in 1948 a strict NTB purchasing monopoly was re-imposed, and the gap between the prices at which the Board bought and sold tobacco was widened to create a fund to employ more European agricultural advisers, with the aim of improving tobacco yields and quality.

== Closure of the NTB ==
In 1956, the activities, powers and duties of the Maize Control, African Tobacco and Cotton Control boards were transferred to the Agricultural Production and Marketing Board. It had powers to buy smallholder surpluses, but its producer prices were biased against peasant producers and did not reflect the rise in living costs: they were so unsatisfactory that even settlers on the Legislative Council called for the revision of the Board’s pricing policy. In 1961, the Agricultural Production and Marketing Board was replaced by the Farmers Marketing Board, which was given wide powers to buy, sell and process farm products, promote price stability and subsidise seed and fertilizer sales. Unlike its predecessors or successors, it neither attempted to restrict who grew tobacco or paid manifestly artificially low prices for their product.

In 1971, the Farmers Marketing Board was replaced by the Agricultural Development and Marketing Corporation (ADMARC), which developed a policy of growing Burley tobacco on estates formed from land taken from peasant smallholders. Smallholders supported the high operating costs of these bodies, much of whose profits came from underpaying farmers, and which re-invested little of their funds in smallholder farming.

== Published Sources ==
- C. A. Baker (1962) Nyasaland, The History of its Export Trade, The Nyasaland Journal, Vol. 15.
- W R Chilowa, (1998). The Impact of Agricultural Liberalisation on Food Security in Malawi, Food Policy Vol. 23 No. 6.
- E Green, (2007). Modern Agricultural History in Malawi: Perspectives on Policy-Choice Explanations, African Studies Review, Vol. 50, No. 3.
- J. A. K. Kandaŵire, (1977). Thangata in Pre-Colonial and Colonial Systems of Land Tenure in Southern Malaŵi, with Special Reference to Chingale, Africa: Journal of the International African Institute, Vol. 47, No. 2,
- J McCracken, (1984). Share-Cropping in Malawi: The Visiting Tenant System in the Central Province c. 1920-1968, in Malawi: An Alternative Pattern of Development, University of Edinburgh.
- J McCracken, (2012). A History of Malawi, 1859–1966 Woodbridge, James Currey. ISBN 978-1-84701-050-6.
- E C Mandala, (2005). The End of Chidyerano: A History of Food and Everyday Life in Malawi, 1860-2004, Heinemann. ISBN 978-0-32507-021-6
- Nyasaland Protectorate, (1946). Report of the Post-war Development Committee, Government Printer
- C Ng'ong'ola, (1986), Malawi's Agricultural Economy and the Evolution of Legislation on the Production and Marketing of Peasant Economic Crops, Journal of Southern African Studies, Vol. 12, No. 2.
- R Palmer, (1985). White Farmers in Malawi: Before and After the Depression, African Affairs Vol. 84 No.335.
- J G Pike, (1968) Malawi: A Political and Economic History, Pall Mall.
- F A Stinson, (1956). Tobacco Farming in Rhodesia and Nyasaland 1889-1956, The Tobacco Research Board of Rhodesia and Nyasaland.
- T Woods, (1993) ´Why not persuade them to grow Tobacco?` Planters, Tenants and the Political Economy of Central Malawi, 1920-1940, African Economic History Vol. 21.
- UK Colonial Office, (1952). An Economic Survey of the Colonial Territories, 1951 Vol. 1, HMSO.
- J K van Donge, (2002). Disordering the Market: The Liberalisation of Burley Tobacco in Malawi in the 1990s, The Journal of Southern African Studies Vol. 28 No.1.
