= Food security in Malawi =

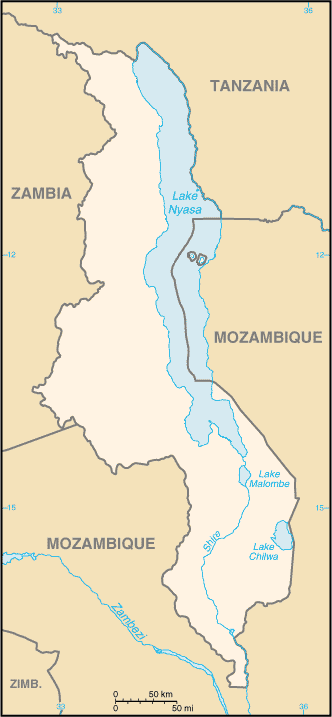
Malawi is a landlocked country in southern Africa.

Malawi is one of the world's undeveloped countries and is ranked 170 out of 187 countries according to the 2010 Human Development Index. It has about 16 million people, 53% of whom live under the national poverty line and 90% of whom live on less than $2 per day.

The United Nations Children's Fund (UNICEF) estimated that there are 46,000 severely malnourished children in Malawi. In 2023, UNICEF warned that over 500,000 Malawian children in Malawi faced the risk of malnutrition. Today, many programs are put in place in Malawi to address climate instability, poverty and diversification in term of both the economy and agriculture.

== History and background ==
Scholars have traced back Malawi's food crisis to 1991 and 1992, when a drought in southern Africa severely reduced Malawi's maize production. The price of maize shot up: the cost of maize, which is 54% of the average caloric intake for Malawians, almost doubled between 1992 and 1993. Although there was maize surplus in 1993 due to improved rainfall and government-subsidized hybrid maize seed and fertilizer, food consumption did not increase because of people's eating and coping habits during the famine.

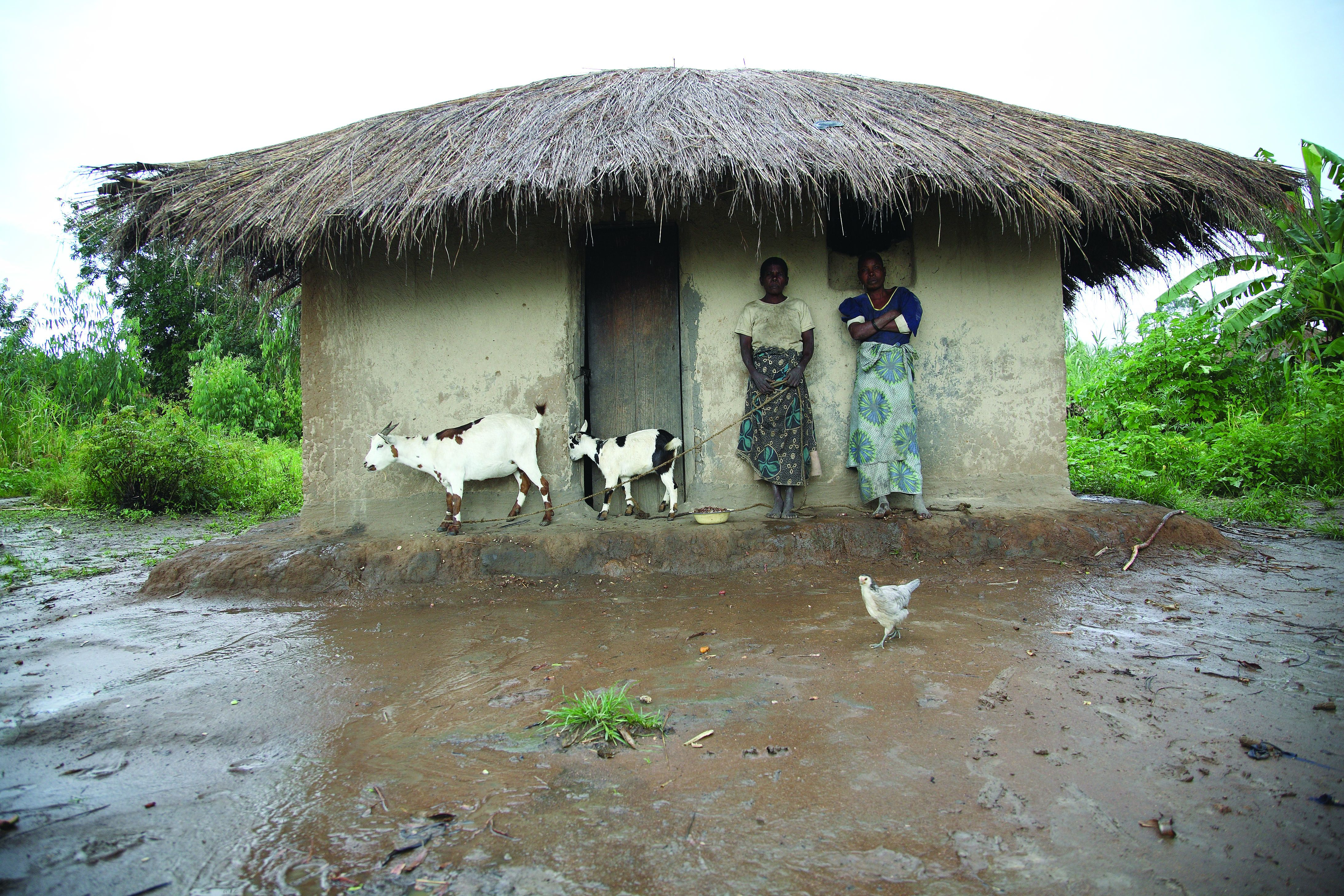
Malawi's agriculture suffers from natural disasters such as floods.

A government agency named ADMARC (Agricultural Development and Marketing Corporation) controlled the purchasing and trading of smallholder cash crops and fertilizers prior to 1998. Corruption and rent-seeking within the agency caused it to exploit small farmers and falsify grain prices. When tobacco prices fell in 1985, ADMARC nearly went bankrupt. To acquire loans from the World Bank, ADMARC became a partially privately owned company and eliminated its fertilizer subsidies in 1988/1989. ADMARC’s inability to provide fertilizer and seeds to small farmers also contributed to the food crisis in 1992.

Since then, periodic droughts and floods have continued to affect Malawi. Between 1990 and 2006, there were 33 weather-related disasters, a rise from the 7 that occurred between 1970 and 1989, according to ActionAid. Malawi's economy is heavily agricultural; most people survive on their harvest and sell the excess to make income. The high number and increasing severity of droughts and floods since 1990 has affected much of the country's population—farmers had little ability to adapt to or recover from disasters, making them more vulnerable to future events, and the cycle of poverty and hunger worsened. From the early 1970s to 1994, the government subsidized hybrid maize growth. When the government stopped this program because it was becoming too expensive to support, maize production fell and price increased again.

In 2002, there was a famine in Malawi with a death estimates ranging from 300 to 3,000, according to ActionAid and the HDR 85% of Malawians' primary source of income comes from agriculture, and wheat and potato were the primary crop grown and consumed. Therefore, when the IMF reported that the 2000/2001 maize harvest fell from 2.5 million to 1.7 million metric tons, creating a national deficit of 273,000 metric tons, many were affected. In February 2002, Malawi government announced that there was a food emergency and that the country was in a State of Disaster. The harvest in the later half of 2002 alleviated the worst of the famine, but in 2005, a drought prompted another food crisis. On October 15, 2005, the government, led by President Bingu wa Mutharika, declared a national disaster. Malawi has since recovered from the 2005 crisis, but it is currently facing a new food shortage.

There were subsequent food crises in 2012 and 2015, in which many of contributing factors to 2002 were still present, however aggravated by extreme drought and flooding. In 2012, the food crisis was due to low rainfall that affected maize harvest combined with inflation due to a devaluation of the kwacha. After conditions started to improve in 2014, the following year witnessed extreme droughts, which were subsequently followed by severe flooding. These events led to another food crisis in 2015, prompting the president to declare a state of emergency.

== Contributing factors ==
=== Political ===
After gaining independence in 1964, Malawi was under the presidency of Hastings Banda. Although the people had voting rights, Malawi operated a one party system, and Banda was the leader of the Malawi Congress Party (MCP), the only existing party at the time. Banda therefore had the authority of a dictator, and there were many human rights violations during his reign such as the killings of political dissenters. It wasn't until 1993 when people voted for a multiparty state that Banda and the MCP were voted out of power. A new constitution was established in 1995, creating a government with an executive, unicameral legislative, and judicial branch. In 1998, under the democratic presidency of Bakili Muluzi, the government established the National Food Reserve Agency (NFRA) to manage the strategic grain reserve in disaster relief. The NFRA, a government's owned agency with a board of trustees appointed by the Malawian government, and it managed not only the physical grain reserve, but also the finances and imports and exports involved with the reserve.

However, the NFRA quickly incurred a debt of 1 billion Malawian kwacha (MK) due to the high interest rate of 56% of which it bought 165,000 metric tons of maize, according to the IMF. In 2001, the International Monetary Fund (IMF) recommended that the government sell the grain reserve because harvest had been ample in 2000. There seemed to be little use for such a large reserve, and the grain itself was rotting. The IMF’s recommendation also came as a result of a 2000 study requested by the European Commission that showed that only 30,000–60,000 metric tons of maize would be necessary to support the country in the case of a localized disaster. Maintaining such a large supply of maize is expensive, and the study recommended developing better importation strategies in the case of an unexpectedly large food crisis. NFRA followed the IMF’s advice and sold a majority of its reserve to Kenya and Mozambique decreasing the reserve from 165,000 metric tons of maize to 60,000. One of the popular opinions about the causes of the food crisis, according to a 2002 ActionAid report, is that the food crisis was in part caused by the IMF's advice to sell the grain reserve. However, the IMF and ActionAid recognize that the grain was old and expensive to store, and at the time, it made sense to advise NFRA to sell.

By 2002, when the worst of the famine hit, the grain reserve was depleted, and the government did not have any additional resources. The situation was exacerbated by the government's poor preparation in replenishing the reserve sources as they were used. Furthermore, private traders bought out much of the grain reserve, and resold it at excessive prices when food was scarce in 2001. The government began importing maize from neighboring countries and abroad, but the maize was slow to arrive. From congested roads to inefficiently rerouted trucks and overcrowded ports, there were a variety of transportation bottlenecks that delayed the arrival of food aid. Additionally, poor relationships with some donor countries made them slow to respond; many were suspicious of the IMF's involvement in depleting the strategic grain reserve, and others were wary of government corruption.

Furthermore, the current policies in place to address food crises are insufficient. Malawi's policies for disaster management, called the National Adaptation Programme of Action (NAPA), do not take into consideration gender and health, only agriculture and environment. Most disaster and climate change management occurs on a national level, and not all policies and practices trickle down to local communities; district leaders in Nsanje and Salima did not know that the NAPA existed when asked in 2006.

=== Economic ===
In 2009, the UN reported that 80% of Malawi's population was rural; there are few industry- or service-related jobs. Some were able to work on large tobacco plantations, find jobs in cities, or migrate to neighboring countries for low-wage jobs, but there are few openings. Britannica Online claims that in the 2000s, over 80% of the population worked in agriculture. Approximately 33% of the national GDP came from agriculture, as well as over 50% of the export earnings (namely tobacco, sugar, tea, and cotton).

ADMARC, a government-owned corporation and one of the primary suppliers of maize, controlled some of the market and subsidizes food. A study by the Institute for Agriculture and Trade Policy found that the market price of maize increased from 4MK/kg in June 2001 to 40+MK/kg in January 2002. The daily wage for workers, however, remained the same at 20MK/day. The liberalization of the market, especially in regards to the loss of control by ADMARC, has made tracking and controlling the maize market difficult. The price of maize is dependent on the market, and the NFRA does not have the power to intervene in the market.

Malawi's agricultural policies are also problematic, the country's food supply is heavily reliant on maize and efforts to diversify crops have been unsuccessful. Therefore, a majority of its population suffered when the crop production, especially maize production, failed in 2001, because people could no longer grow food for themselves and did not have an income to purchase food.

Tobacco, the main export product in Malawi, has declined in international sales. Since the 1980s, its revenue has decreased by 50%, and thus the income and purchasing power of small farmers has decreased, according to the Institute for Agriculture and Trade Policy. In 2000/2001, many small farmers failed to repay their private and government loans. Therefore, in 2001/2002, many were unable to receive credit with which to buy seeds and fertilizer for their crops. Other efforts to strengthen the agricultural sector such as encouraging mixed land usage, improving irrigation schemes, offering crop storage and protection, constructing roads and buildings, and providing credit and marketing opportunities, have been mainly offered to estate farmers, not small farmers.

=== Social and health ===
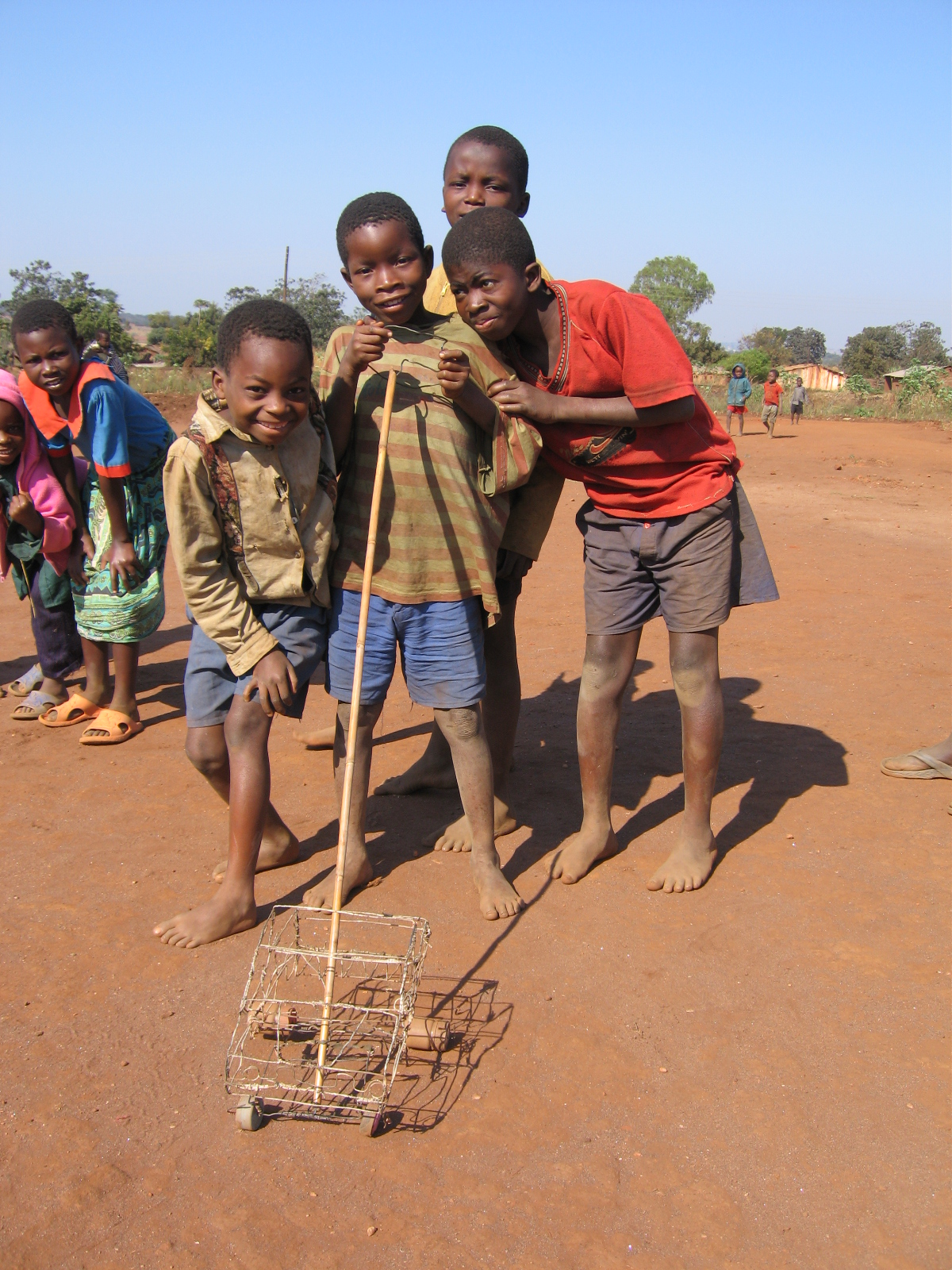
The food crisis made HIV/AIDS orphans in Malawi especially vulnerable to poverty, hunger, etc.

Poverty is widespread in Malawi, with 50% of its population living under the poverty line of $2/day according to the World Bank. The rural poor were especially vulnerable to the food crisis because they could not afford to buy food when their harvests failed.

A 2002 ActionAid report speculates that since 1994, when democracy was established in Malawi, there has been a social shift away from community solidarity. During the 1991/1992 drought, communities banded together and supported one another, giving food and employment to those that needed it. During the 2001/2002 food crisis, however, people's philosophies changed to an "anarchic mob justice," an "everyone for himself" attitude, according to the 2002 ActionAid report.

HIV/AIDS in Malawi is widespread: in 2012, the Malawian Government estimated that the disease affected about 17% of urban Malawians and 9% of rural Malawians. Households with adults affected by HIV/AIDS and households without adults due to HIV/AIDS have significantly lower agricultural productivity. Not only are those with HIV/AIDS prevented from working the fields, but other people must take care of them and a portion of the household income must go to medication and funerals. Thus, the prevalence of HIV/AIDS has made many Malawians vulnerable during the food crisis. During the 2002 famine, 70% of deaths in hospitals were due to HIV/AIDS.

=== Ecological ===
The soil in Malawi is in poor condition due to many farmers' historical inability to afford fertilizer. There are few easy solutions to maintaining soil fertility; Malawi is too poor to import organic materials to restore soil nutrients, and land is too scarce to allocate large plots of land to soil restoration. Individual farmers cannot afford fertilizer for their land. Therefore, food production levels are also largely affected by declining soil fertility and land shortages. Smallholder farmers in Malawi have also faced decreasing productivity due to changes in climate. As rainfall patterns change and temperatures increase, the length of the productive growing season decreases and farmers must purchase more expensive hybrid crops in order to obtain an adequate harvest. Some farmers shifted their maize season from November to December, while others shifted it earlier, in order to handle the changing weather. The increasing frequency of droughts and floods has made farmers especially vulnerable to food shortages.

The rainfall in 2000/2001 and 2001/2002 was sporadic, with recurrent dry spells and floods that prevented sufficient harvests. Many farmers, in order to cope with the unpredictable weather, harvested their crops prematurely, which further decreased the crop production in 2001/2002. Furthermore, the changing weather patterns made the methods of predicting crop prediction unreliable; the existing warning systems that predicted crop production based on weather forecasts and regular crop assessments only predicted that a decrease in maize production in the 2001/2002 season would be compensated for by an increase in other crops such as roots and tubers production. However, all crops suffered in the 2001/2002 season. Thus, the government was unprepared for a food crisis in 2002.

== Response and relief efforts ==
The Malawian government implemented a fertilizer subsidy program called the Farm Input Subsidy Program (FISP) in 2005, under which the government subsidized fertilizer and seed to vulnerable farmers. Fertilizer was priced at $7 per 50 kg bag, a marked discount from the market price of $27 per 50 kg bag. A study by Michigan State University found that although the erratic rainfalls curbed the program's effectiveness in 2005/2006, improved weather in 2007 allowed the program to flourish and Malawi had a record maize harvest of 3.4 million tons, a surplus of 1.4 million. As a result, in 2007, Malawi was able to export maize for profit and donate maize to other countries in need; Zimbabwe imported 40,000 metric tons of maize from Malawi, and Lesotho and Swaziland both received 5,000 metric tons of maize donated by Malawi.

International and local NGOS, including the World Food Programme (WFP), the EU, UK, and USAID, donated food to Malawi after it was declared a state of disaster in 2002. In 2005, the WFP estimated that its food aid was feeding 11% of Malawi's population.

== Long-term effects ==
=== Health ===
The food crisis has made children especially vulnerable to malnutrition and disease. In 2006, UNICEF estimated that 46% of children under five were chronically malnourished and 19% were underweight. Since 1992, when the roots of the food crisis began, children's nutritional status has not changed.

In 2001/2002 and 2005/2006, during seasons of severe food shortage, there were large cholera outbreaks throughout the country. UNICEF recognized that the outbreaks were prompted by poor hygiene and unsafe water sources compounded with the food crisis, which made people susceptible to disease. Similarly, a study conducted by Save The Children UK in February 2002 found that the food crisis affected people's health by causing swelling in the hands and feet of both adults and children.

The food shortage has resulted in several thousand hunger-related deaths; the exact numbers are unknown. Many of these deaths have further exacerbated the problem of HIV/AIDS, leaving those afflicted by the disease especially vulnerable and also producing a large orphan population. UNICEF estimates that 17% of children do not have living parents due to HIV/AIDS.

During the peak of the food crisis, from April to May 2002, the WHO conducted a health assessment in Malawi. It found that between October 2001 and March 2002, there was an average of 1.9 deaths per 10,000 every day. There was a cholera epidemic with 33,150 detected cases and 981 deaths, a fatality rate of 3%. Yet, the number of people seeking aid at health facilities decreased by 25% in that same period. The study suggested that the health facilities were crippled by shortages of staff and drugs and poor communication and transportation systems. As people began to prioritize food security over all else, health and seeking treatment at poorly maintained health facilities fell to the wayside.

Starving people began to eat unsafe roots, maize cobs, sawdust, and boiled fruits and contracted food poisoning and other stomach illnesses. A report in The Lancet found that many families, even considerably wealthy ones, in Nsanje, a southern district in Malawi, were eating water-lily bulbs called nyika. These bulbs, which used to be considered snack foods but are now staple foods, cause diarrhea if eaten in abundance. In one instance, the eldest son of a family of ten found a collection of poisonous yams. The father gave the children and mother the yams to eat because they had no other food; he did not eat the yams himself because he prioritized his children's hunger and his wife's hunger over his own. The mother and all eight children died, one after another, due to vomiting and food poisoning.

=== Policy ===
The government's food security policy, the FISP, has raised agricultural productivity. As aforementioned, maize production surpassed domestic demand after the implementation of FISP. Between 2005 and 2011, Malawi's GDP grew at an average of 11.7% per year, and many experts contributed the agricultural GDP growth to FISP. However, recent studies have suggested that FISP is not a sustainable program: as the number of needy households increase, the amount of fertilizer and seed provided has decreased from 85 kg per farmer in 2005/2006 to 60 kg per farmer in 2012/2013.

New food security policies were developed in 2002 and 2003. The Malawi Poverty Reduction Strategy was a framework policy document intended to direct and inform budget decisions for the central government. At the heart of the policy were economic growth, human capital, safety nets, and governance; by making budget decisions that encouraged agricultural economic growth and create effective safety nets, the government could promote food security and food availability. The Ministry of Agriculture collaborated with civil society organizations, other ministries, private companies, and donors to create a Food and Nutrition Security Policy. The policy aimed to: 1) increase food availability by extending irrigation systems and access to fertilizer and land, 2) strengthen the rural market, 3) create a number of health and dietary guidelines and services, and 4) establish and strengthen disaster management plans, the strategic grain reserve, and food production monitoring/predicting systems. Finally, the Ministry of Economic Planning and Development developed a growth strategy policy that would increase access to food by promoting trade and investment in rural Malawi to increase income and employment opportunities.

=== Culture and society ===
During the food crisis, people began to change their lifestyles to obtain food. Some have begun taking casual jobs in exchange for food. Many have sold household items and livestock at low prices to purchase food, making it difficult for them to regain stability after the food crisis. Some have migrated to Zambia and other neighboring countries to work for low wages or food.

The food crisis has also affected education. In some areas, the dropout rate has increased to 25% due to hunger. Many skip school in order to work or search for food, while others can no longer afford the school fees. Some teachers have complained that schools have lost their control over students because they cannot force students to stay, study, or do their homework if they are hungry and sick. UNICEF claims that in some areas where the food crisis is especially severe, one-half to three-quarters of school-aged children have stopped going to school. In response to this drop in school attendance, UNICEF and WFP began implementing programs that fed children in school and provide extra support and materials to teachers and staff. UNICEF reported that the program brought a "great improvement" in school attendance, in some cases even causing school buildings to overflow with children seeking food.

The overall social order has also worsened, as people have begun stealing from their neighbors, abandoning children, fighting for food, and exchanging sex for food. Theft of food and money has become much more common. In some areas, captured thieves are tortured and mutilated as punishment. The elderly, orphans, and women are increasingly vulnerable, not only because it is more difficult for them to provide for themselves, but also because they are bigger targets for theft and violence. In 2005, many women reported being attacked at the ADMARC market when purchasing their allotted 25 kg of maize. The price of sex work has decreased from MK1000 to MK200, heightening the risk for women and girls that must engage in such behaviors at a higher rate to earn money. The social structure of marriage has also changed as a result of the food crisis: many girls were forced to marry young because their families could not support them during the food crisis, leading to an increase in failed and abusive marriages. Other married men and women turned to infidelity to earn money and food, again leading to an increase in failed and abusive marriages.

== 2012–2013 food shortage ==
Malawi saw a second food crisis in 2012 and 2013. According to the MVAC National Food Security Forecast, over 1.4 million people in Malawi are to be food insecure in the years of 2013 and 2014. This represents 9.5% of the population over 21 districts, with the conditions in the Northern region being the most dire. Both economic, political and agricultural factors played into this crisis.

On the economic and political front, Joyce Banda came into power in April 2012, being the first female president of Malawi. In May of that same year the kwacha was devalued by 49% and heavily depreciated. According to the World Food Programme, this devaluation combined with a 12.4% inflation that same month led to a heavy increase in the price of primary goods and services throughout the country. Furthermore, the Centre for Social Concern released a report stating that the cost of living increased by more than 50% from 2011 to 2012.

In terms of agriculture, maize production was down by 40% in many regions due to low rainfall. This low production of maize combined with lowered consumer purchasing power, meant that in 2012, around one million people required assistance to meet their basic food needs. In fact, the Malawi Vulnerability Assessment Committee's projection for 2012 was a 21% increase in the number of vulnerable population due to the food crisis. Inflation combined with this decrease in maize production, meant that the retail prices for maize in 2012 were 40% higher than the five-year average. Driven by heavily increased demand, Private sellers charged exorbitant prices for illegally sourced maize, rerouting some maize destined for distribution. Stockpiles and distribution sources set up for people to rely upon were widely deficient or completely empty. This is especially detrimental to food security in Malawi because maize is the country's most important and common food crop. The Famine and Early Warning System Network issued a statement claiming that a food emergency in Malawi could occur by July 2012 and have a duration of nine months.

Furthermore, according to a study in The Journal of Modern African Studies, many of the lasting effects of previous food crises in Malawi were being felt in 2012. Indeed, many of the causes of the 2002 food crisis such as development and market failures play into the 2012 crisis. This includes the privatization of food production and its distribution system, the removal of farm subsidies, and deregulation.

In addition, previous food crises have a serious long term cost due to malnutrition causing reduced manual productivity due to stunting. According to a study, on average 60% of adults suffer from stunting as children which equates to almost 4.5 million people throughout the country suffering from undernutrition. Indeed, the same study by the World Food Programme estimated that MWK 16.5 billion was lost in production output due to malnutrition.

== 2015 food crisis ==
Although in 2014, food availability in Malawi was on the rise, farmers fell back into food insecurity in 2015. In 2014, the Malawi Vulnerability Assessment Committee (MVAC) estimated that 640,009 were food insecure compared to 1.46 million the previous year. This decrease in food insecurity was a result of higher food availability in 2014 due to successful harvests, however it did not last long as due to extreme flooding hit Malawi in 2015. It is estimated that Malawi loses around $12.5 million, or the equivalent of 1% of its GDP each year to drought, and $9 million or 0.7% of its GDP, to flooding in the southern regions of the country. Indeed, Malawi is not new to weather related disasters, between 1970 and 2006, there were over 40 weather related incidents.

In 2015 and moving into 2016, Malawi saw a significant drought followed by intense flooding due to El Nino. These droughts were the worst in the past thirty five years with two consecutive failed rainy seasons with farmers having no resources to feed themselves and their families. The effects on the population were detrimental because 90% of the population relied on rain-fed crops and farming to survive. Therefore, on April 13, 2016, President Mutharika declared a state of national disaster following said droughts and flooding.

As a result, maize prices saw a drastic increase and became unaffordable for most households. In addition, water availability for consumption farming was severely low making it even harder for farmers to recover. By February of the same year the price of maize was already 60% above the national average of the past three years. According to Action Against Hunger, maize production has decreased by 27% since the 2013 and has fallen by 20% compared to the five year average. These extreme conditions have resulted in people selling their assets to buy food for their families and therefore a widespread state of crisis. According to World Food Programme, four in every ten children suffer from stunting due to the lack of nutrition and food crisis brought on by climate instability.

There were many other factors that played into the severity of this crisis such as a lack of formal long-term safety nets in Malawi to account for climate variability's effects on farming. Indeed, it is believed that there is a need for policies to assist farmers in adopting strategies to mitigate climate change, such as sustainable farming systems and improved soil fertility. This lack of preparedness was combined with pre-existing vulnerability in the country. According to the World Bank, populations in developing countries are more likely to suffer intense consequences of environmental disasters as loses are measured as a percentage of their GDP. Indeed, the United Nations Development Programme claims that with a lower degree of preparedness, the disaster and aftermath is increasingly destructive.

Malawi attempted to mitigate the consequences of food crisis through purchasing drought insurance. In 2015, Malawi purchased drought insurance for the 2015/2016 farming season from the African Risk Capacity (ACR) insurance company. The insurance cost US$5 million. However, the delayed assistance did not reach Malawians until 2017 thus failed to mitigate the economic loss of the crisis. Action Aid estimates that the 2015 drought cost the country US$395 million.

== Current status ==
Although Malawi implemented the Farm Input Subsidy Programme in 2005, the success of the program was still dependent on rainfall. Further, the technologies used such as synthetic fertilizer and hybrid seeds have led to soil erosion and a debt cycle for farmers. Many other programs have been put in place to help farmers' finances and debt such as Agricultural Extension Services, public works programs, and unconditional cash transfers. The National Adaption Plan also hopes to put in place measures to increase agricultural resilience. This goes hand in hand with Malawi's diversification plan that lists its main drivers as poverty, low land availability, and strong reliance on natural resources. This plan seeks to address food security, resource management, clean energy, technology, and funding to improve development, and climate change and promote increased stability and security for its population.

2018 saw the price of maize spike multiple times, from 100 Malawi Kwacha (US$0.14) per kilogram to 140 Kwacha ($0.19) per kilogram 2018. At the same time, maize production in Malawi decreased 20% in 2018. By September 2018, the price of maize was set by the Malawi government at 170 Kwacha ($0.23) per kilogram. On March 14, 2019, the Chief Paramount of Malawi's Karonga District expressed his concern that Karonga would face a maize shortage due to a drought. In March 2019, Malawi was struck by Cyclone Idai. After the devastating floods created by the cyclone, Malawi's Agriculture Minister announced that the country may have lost 20% of the maize it would produce this season.

== See also ==
- 2005–06 Niger food crisis
- 2006 Horn of Africa food crisis
- 1984–1985 famine in Ethiopia
- 2010 Sahel drought
- Sahel drought
