= Agricultural Development and Marketing Corporation =

Company in Malawi

The Agricultural Development and Marketing Corporation, usually known as ADMARC, was formed in Malawi in 1978 as a government-owned corporation or parastatal to promote the Malawian economy by increasing the volume and quality of its agricultural exports, to develop new foreign markets for the consumption of Malawian agricultural produce and to support Malawi's farmers. It was the successor of a number of separate marketing boards of the colonial-era and early post-colonial times, whose functions were as much about controlling African smallholders or generating government revenues as promoting agricultural development. At its foundation, ADMARC was given the power to finance the economic development of any public or private organisation, agricultural or not.

In its first decade of operation, ADMARC was considered to be more business-like and less bureaucratic than similar parastatal bodies in other African nations, but from its formation it was involved in the diversion of resources from smallholder farming to tobacco estates, often owned by members of the ruling elite. This led to corruption, abuse of office and inefficiency in ADMARC and, as the result of declining world tobacco prices, it had become insolvent by 1985. To obtain World Bank loans, ADMARC had to be partially privatised, but the neo-liberal economic policies imposed on it by the World Bank forced it to cut fertilizer subsidies, which contributed to severe food shortages in Malawi in 1992. Following the 1992 shortages, international aid donors demanded a return to multi-party politics by 1994, and President Banda, who had ruled since 1964, was peacefully removed from office during this transition.

In the aftermath of these imposed changes, ADMARC's role was reduced to that of a buyer of last resort and to promoting food security by maintaining a strategic reserve of maize, to be created through domestic and foreign purchases. In 1996, the World Bank again intervened, criticising ADMARC's import of maize as an unjustified subsidy, and requiring it to give up control of grain imports. ADMARC's record of promoting food security and maintaining a strategic reserve from domestic purchases after 1996 was patchy: its intervention prevented a famine in 1998, but financial pressures in 2000 and 2001 forced it to sell much of its maize reserves just before a poor harvest in 2002, resulting in food shortages and famine. A third round of World Bank intervention in 2002 forced ADMARC to reduce its financial losses by reducing its trading operations and to allow private sector competition. This market liberalisation had mixed results: ADMARC survived in a changed form, and by 2009 it was growing again. In 2003, ADMARC's legal form ceased to be that of a parastatal corporation following the repeal of the legislation that created it as such, becoming a limited liability company, and it still exists because it has not been possible to create a comprehensive private-sector marketing system. However, ADMARC is criticised by donors as inefficient, wasteful and not sufficiently independent of government control.

== Forerunners of ADMARC ==
=== From the 1920s to 1951 ===
The two forms of colonial-era produce marketing boards had different aims. Some, as in the Rhodesias, supported white commercial farmers; others as in Nyasaland and Tanganyika controlled African smallholders and restricted competition between them and white settlers. The declared objectives of Nyasaland's colonial legislation on the production, control and marketing of economic crops were to increase the quantity and improve the quality of these crops, and to stabilise the income of farmers through periods of price fluctuation. Restrictions were imposed on the number of growers and their output to improve produce quality, and to match production to market demand. This was done by registering growers and refusing to register those deemed unsuitable, fixing producer prices, licensing buyers and exporters and establishing commodity boards, which often had exclusive responsibility for controlling the production and marketing, initially of individual crops. For most of the colonial period, statutory interference in the production and marketing of the crops grown on European-owned estate was kept to a minimum, and controls in the estate production if tea and tobacco were introduced at the request, or with the consent, of the settler associations responsible for these crops. The use of marketing controls allowed the Nyasaland government to increase its revenues by offering smallholders prices that were lower than prevailing world market prices. The colonial state also indirectly taxed the smallholders by retaining a significant part of the profits of sale from their produce. Market regulations were extended to food crops after the Second World War and, by the mid-1950s, marketing boards controlled the buying and sale of most African smallholder produce.

Regulations introduced for Tobacco in 1926 and Cotton in 1934 required the registration of African peasant growers on Native Trust Land; the first also created the Native Tobacco Board (NTB). Settler demands for the regulation of the peasant tobacco and cotton sectors were partly motivated by fears that profitable smallholder farming could reduce the availability of cheap African labour for their estates. The Nyasaland administration did not encourage independent peasant tobacco production in the Southern Province, where most settler estates were located, and it allowed the Native Tobacco Board to operate in a way that preserved and promoted settler tobacco interests there. The formation of the Native Tobacco Board did stimulate African production in the Central Region, but registered growers paid heavily for its operations. At first, the Board charged African growers a levy of thirty pence a hundred pounds of tobacco, 10% of the price it paid them. In 1930, this was raised to one third of the price paid to meet increased administrative costs. In the Second World War and after the Board more than recovered its costs while it underpaid growers, retaining between 25% and 35% of the auction prices it obtained to meet costs equal to only 15% to 20% of those prices. In 1930-1931, the Native Tobacco Board had 29,515 registered growers in the Central Region, where it purchased 4.9 million pounds of tobacco. The number of growers varied with demand until the Second World War when it expanded markedly. The Board had fewer growers in the Southern Province, partly because of European growers’ opposition, although the climate in that province was also less suitable. The Native Tobacco Board (later renamed the African Tobacco Board) limited tobacco growing by smallholders by imposing heavy dues until demand and prices rose after the war, when these levies became proportionately lower.

Compared with the Rhodesias, Nyasaland in the 1940s lacked a developed system for producing and distributing food surpluses. Its estates did not grow food commercially for local consumption, as towns were few and small, and transport was limited and expensive. It was left to the African smallholders to supply the domestic markets locally. Commercial maize growing in Malawi was not feasible without government support, but its Maize Control Board did little to promote smallholder maize growing and it aimed to create a market of less than 5% of the estimated annual crop.

The Maize Control Board (MCB) formed in 1947 was supposed to ensure that Malawi's maize supplies were maintained and to guarantee minimum prices to farmers. It was given wide powers of control over maize marketing, but as maize could be grown or almost anywhere, its objectives were unattainable with the limited organisation it had. The MCB was hampered by lack of funds; it was reluctant to promote higher maize production for the local market on grounds of cost, and up to 1949 it also discouraged growing for export. To cover the cost of a country-wide network, the Board fixed a very low buying price and sold maize at double this price. The low prices that the MCB paid in the period 1945-1951 discouraged farmers from growing maize in excess of their own requirements, and inhibited the development of commercial grain markets. By paying the same price in remote areas as in accessible ones and by maintaining price floors in years of surplus, the MCB hoped to create grain reserves. However, as it paid only a penny for two to three pounds of maize against a market price of at least a penny a pound, growers lacked any incentive to produce for it and withheld their surpluses from the board's markets. The quantities of maize available for the home market dropped significantly at a time of growing demand caused by poor harvests in the run up to the major famine in 1949.

After the 1949 famine, the MCB promoted maize production and exports, but when world prices fell in the 1950s, it abandoned the import and export trade, and the Nyasaland administration discouraged maize production in agriculturally unsuitable areas. By 1960, government intervention in maize marketing was limited to purchasing sufficient maize for the government's own use and for a small food reserve. The deregulation of maize marketing was later extended to other types of food produce in 1959.

=== The late Colonial and post-Colonial periods ===
In 1952, an African Produce and Marketing Board (later renamed the Agricultural Production and Marketing Board) was created, initially with control over the marketing of African produce including maize, beans, peas, wheat, groundnuts, rice, sorghum millet, cassava and cotton seed. In 1956, the activities, powers and duties of the Maize Control, African Tobacco and Cotton Control boards were transferred to the renamed Agricultural Production and Marketing Board. This had powers to buy smallholder surpluses, but its producer prices were biased against peasant producers and did not reflect the rise in farmers' living costs: the prices were so unsatisfactory that even settlers on the Legislative Council called for the revision of the Board's pricing policy. The first General Manager of the newly formed Agricultural Production and Marketing Board was Lionel R. Osborne, who served in this capacity until August 1962.

When Dr Hastings Banda became Agriculture Minister in 1961, these policies were not greatly changed. The Agricultural Production and Marketing Board was replaced by the Farmers Marketing Board (FMB) in 1962, and European Board members were replaced by growers’ representatives. The Farmers Marketing Board was given wide powers to buy, sell and process farm products, promote price stability and subsidise seed and fertilizer. Banda recognised Malawi had few resources other than agriculture. He was an interventionist, and FMB became an aggressive purchaser of smallholders’ produce, but before 1969, its purchasing monopoly operated on a not-for-profit basis. This monopoly was partly offset by allowing co-operative societies to market crops, and African businessmen to act as carriers of produce, but little was done to raise producer prices. From 1963, the activities of the FMB included participation in business ventures through the provision of capital or loans. To accumulate investment funds, competition in marketing African produce was restricted and the FMB's monopoly was strengthened. The late colonial era administration's policy of limiting food controls to a few crops in selected areas was abandoned by the post-independence government in favour of greater intervention. The Agriculture Minister was empowered to impose regulations affecting virtually every major food crop produced for sale or consumption by Africans in any district of the country. p. 255.

During the first years after independence in 1964, Banda and the governing Malawi Congress Party actively supported the smallholder farming sector, as few European-owned estates remained. Disappointing smallholder production and the development of a policy of growing Burley tobacco on estates persuaded the government that it should to transfer land and resources to a revived estate sector where the land was frequently leased by members of the government or party. In 1966, Banda argued that customary land tenure was insecure and inhibited investment. A Customary Land Development Act in 1967 allowed the creation of agricultural leases of up to 99 years over Customary Land. Many estates in the Central Region growing Burley tobacco were created, most controlled by Banda and senior officials and politicians of the Malawi Congress Party. Land alienation became more rapid in the 1970s; however the process differed from that of the early colonial period as most new estates were medium-sized farms and not in the scale of former European-owned estates. This still represented the transfer of land from smallholders to a new elite.

== ADMARC under Banda ==
=== The formation of ADMARC ===
In 1971, a Farmers Marketing (Amendment) Act changed the name of the FMB to the Agricultural Development and Marketing Corporation (ADMARC). It also changed the corporate structure: instead of the FMB's non-executive chairman, ADMARC was given an executive chairman and a Board comprising him and between four and eight directors, all appointed by the Agriculture Minister. It was given the new power to assist any public or private organisation with capital, credit or other resources in any projects it considered would promote the economic development of Malawi. ADMARC had three mandates: to promote the Malawian economy by increasing the volume of exportable economic crops and improving their quality, to develop new agricultural markets by promoting the consumption of Malawian agricultural produce abroad and to support farmers on Customary Land. To achieve its mandates, it was divided into three sections dealing with internal marketing, the export trade and the management of development projects. It took over the FMB monopolies over maize, tobacco and cotton, and its powers to fix prices, operate markets and supply credit. ADMARC produce prices were uniform across Malawi: these rarely changed, so reducing price fluctuations. It was also a major seller of maize, having 47% of the market in 1982. Smallholders had to support ADMARC's high operating costs, and much of its profits came from underpaying them. Despite its mandate, it only re-invested 5% of funds in smallholder farms but subsidised estate farms and other, non-farming. businesses. By the mid-1980s, ADMARC was diverting two-thirds of its annual income into the estate sector. Until 1979, it had sound finances, but when tobacco prices collapsed in that year, its liquidity problems threatened its main creditors, Malawi's two commercial banks.

State intervention in marketing peasant produce was justified in colonial times as protecting farmers against commodity price fluctuations. However, in ADMARC, development and profit-making were given priority of over price stabilisation. At first, ADMARC accumulated substantial profits and re-invested them in a range of private companies and statutory corporations. Compared to those its neighbours Tanzania, Zambia, and later Mozambique and Zimbabwe, Malawi's parastatal bodies were less bureaucratic and aimed to be business-like and profitable. In particular, ADMARC was considered by outside agencies to be efficient until 1980. With an economic decline at the start of the 1980s, the flaws in its strategy became apparent, as profit accumulation had reduced the economic well-being of the peasant producers. The main beneficiaries of this strategy were the political elite who controlled those organisations sponsored by ADMARC, the urban population who obtained subsidised food and the paid employees of ADMARC and other state bodies. Transferring resources away from smallholders to the state led to corruption and abuse of office. In 1977, a long serving ADMARC chairman was convicted for misusing corporation property in his private businesses and of making large unauthorised loans to a private company in which he and family were involved. Corruption and general inefficiency in statutory corporations including ADMARC resulted in a 1980 law limiting their directors to holding office for a two-year period, although this could be, and often was, renewed. This reform was not followed by any change in ADMARC's business activities or its conflicting roles as a marketing organisation and provider of development finance.

=== Failure to provide food security ===
Before the 1980s, smallholders grew local, open-pollinated types of maize, using seed reserved from previous crops. With adequate rain, this needed 80 to 120 days to develop fully. The hybrid maize introduced in the 1980s, ripened after as little as 75 days in similar conditions, provided it was given sufficient fertilizer. Local maize also benefited from the application of fertilizer, but hybrid maize only yielded its target crip if up to 4 tonnes per hectare if sufficient fertilizer was used, and to maintain this level, new seed had to be purchased every year. Growing hybrid maize therefore required reasonable sale prices and low fertilizer costs for farmers. However, farm incomes started to decline after 1976, and from 1981 to 1986 the real value of Malawi maize producer prices fell to 40% to 60% compared to those of other Central and East African states. Even with low fertilizer prices, hybrid maize growing was difficult for smallholders to sustain.

From 1971, ADMARC subsidised fertilizer for every farmer. Estates benefited most, as tobacco needed more fertilizer than maize. Estates also had access to credit and, without this, few smallholders could buy enough fertilizer, even when it was subsidised. After 1985, declining world tobacco prices and its role in supporting the estates made ADMARC insolvent. The Malawi government agreed to partially privatise it to obtain World Bank loans. ADMARC also lost the power to invest in new development projects, but remained under the influence of the government. The World Bank required a phased elimination of fertilizer subsidies, which decreased from 30.5% in 1983/84 to 19.8% in 1987/88. A complete withdrawal of these subsidies prevented 75% of smallholders buying any fertilizer in 1988/89: a 25% subsidy was restored for 1989/90 and 1990/91 but removed in 1991/92. A temporary 11% subsidy was provided from 1992/93 to 1994/95 only.

The partial privatisation left ADMARC with limited funds to supply fertilizer and seed to smallholders, and the closure of many of its depots hindered their distribution. Credit was also tightened and, from 1988 until 1992 (when donors funded alternatives), smallholders had little access to credit. An increase in maize producer prices in 1988 did not compensate those farmers that had previously grown hybrid maize for their lost subsidies, so many reverted to growing local maize. After privatisation had increased competition, ADMARC reduced its maize sales, but by 1988 it had to support over 500,000 Mozambican refugees, and could not replenish its stocks from the poor harvests of the late 1980s. Its weakness led to increased consumer prices and reduced food security.

It only needed a significant fall in rainfall to cause a crisis, and in 1989-90 and 1990-91 Malawi's rainfall was at best moderate and locally poor. The poor harvests of these years depleted smallholder food reserves before the deeper crisis in 1991-92. Rainfall before the 1991 planting season was low and sporadic, and the withdrawal of fertilizer subsidies made what would have been a poor harvest in any event even poorer: only 40% of the normal maize crop was gathered in 1992. After better rainfall and a good crop in 1992-93, the 1993-94 growing season was dry, and its harvest was below 50% of normal levels. Maize prices were very high, as household and ADMARC reserves were low, and alternative foods were scarce. The crisis was caused by state regulation of agriculture, the diversion of resources to inefficient estates and failure to support smallholders growing food crops: all these were policies executed through ADMARC. Fertilizer subsidies and Malawi-wide ADMARC pricing and market coverage were no substitute for paying reasonable prices for the crops that farmers grew. Although withdrawal of subsidies exacerbated the agricultural decline, that decline had originated in the policies the government had followed since ADMARC was formed.

== ADMARC after Banda ==
=== Liberalisation and intervention ===
After the 1992 famine, international donors made their aid conditional on the re-establishment of political pluralism by 1994. One party formed by Malawian exiles opposed to Banda returned to Malawi in 1993, and others were formed within the country. The United Democratic Front (UDF) won most votes in 1994 and 1999, but not a majority. Its governments were weak and only retained power in alliance with the support of smaller parties. These governments were accused of corruption, clientism and the uncritical acceptance of World Bank policies.

Smallholders had relied on the dense network of ADMARC markets before 1987 to obtain fertilizer or seed and to buy or sell crops at standard prices. The 1987 partial privatisation inspired by the World Bank left ADMARC short of funds to provide these services. Despite liberalisation, few private traders emerged to fill the gap left by ADMARC's downsizing, and maize markets were disrupted. Malawi was increasingly dependent on imported maize in deficit years, but limited state funding forced ADMARC to use commercial loans to import 312,000 tonnes of maize a year in the 1990s. It also had to create, with inadequate funds, a 180,000 tonne Strategic Grain Reserve from whichever was cheaper of domestic or imported maize to stabilise prices for farmers and consumers. The World Bank criticised the losses ADMARC incurred on its sales of imported maize as an untargeted subsidy: in 1996, it required the creation of a National Food Reserve Agency (NFRA) independent of government influence to control grain imports. NFRA was not responsible for price stability, and was poorly funded. ADMARC kept control over domestic grain and remained under political control. It also started selling the domestic reserves it controlled after the NFRA was formed.

In 1997, ADMARC had needed to sell the strategic reserve to repay its loans, and after a poor harvest later in 1997, maize stocks were low and consumer prices high. Rainfall in 1997/98 was erratic and the 1998 crop was also poor: ADMARC released reserves and imported maize to prevent famine. The 1999 and 2000 maize harvests were good, supported by large sweet potato and cassava crops, grown as the result of USAID projects to promote drought-resistant foods. ADMARC undertook a partial sale of its reserves in 2000, as it could not pay the interest its commercial loans. Sales, including some exports at low prices continued in 2001 despite a poor harvest. The harvest of 2002 was also disappointing, and failure to prevent food shortages caused deaths from hunger and related diseases, mainly in 2002. Estimates of the death toll ranged from a semi-official figure of 500 to 1,000 to credible reports by NGO over 1,000. The harvest of 2003 was also poor and that of 2004 was deficient in maize and in root crops; the next satisfactory harvest was in 2005. Rural poverty increased and by 2005, about 14% of Malawian adult were HIV positive.

=== After the 2002 famine ===
After 2002, ADMARC was under pressure to reduce its financial losses by curtailing its trading operations. The World Bank disliked ADMARC being under political control, proposing that it should only keep its core agricultural marketing operations and only provide marketing services in those outlying areas of the country where private sector competition was limited. ADMARC was also to give up excess warehouse space in and near towns to a new company, the Malawi Agricultural Warehousing and Trading Company (MAWTCO), which would then lease warehouse space to the private sector. These reforms were implemented from 2006 on, with World Bank support. However, the private sector lacked the capacity to provide competitive marketing services. It was unable to store enough of grain to meet food needs in the lean season each year, unwilling to buy maize from smallholders in remote rural areas and without the capacity to import sufficient maize during national shortfalls to maintain prices. As Malawian maize markets did not act competitively, direct state intervention was needed. ADMARC therefore remained as a residual buyer and seller, operating designated floor and ceiling prices. ADMARC's role allowed some long-distance maize trading between surplus and deficit areas, and created some competition in areas which lacked competing buyers.

When Malawi's agricultural sector was liberalised, it was expected that the role of the parastatal ADMARC would be taken over by private traders, and that the private sector would create an efficient marketing system that would stimulate the use of fertilizer and hybrid maize, which would lead in turn to expanded distribution networks. Liberalisation, it was hoped, would create an efficient and responsive private sector marketing system that would stimulate agricultural production. On the contrary, the withdrawal of ADMARC from most areas contributed to widespread food insecurity among smallholder farmers in Malawi, especially those in remote areas. To fill up the vacuum created following the withdrawal of ADMARC, the Ministry of Agriculture launched a development programme to train agro-dealers preferably rural shop owners. This started in 2001 with financial support from the USAID, but the programme had limited success as the majority of those trained ceased to be active agro-dealers within a few years of training, and most continuing agro-dealers were not rural based small-businessmen, as to start a successful dealing business required more capital than these possessed.

In 2003, the legislation that created ADMARC with the legal form of a parastatal corporation was repealed as the result of World Bank pressure. However, it was immediately reconstituted as a limited liability company, in which the Malawi government held, and still holds 99% of its shares and appoints its directors, so it remains effectively government owned and controlled. It still exists because it has not been possible to create a comprehensive private-sector marketing system, but ADMARC is criticised as inefficient, wasteful and not sufficiently independent of government control. However, the company's website later

At the peak of liberalisation in 2002/03, there were only 180 ADMARC outlets. By 2009/10, the number of ADMARC-operated markets had grown to 788, and in 2010/11 the figure rose further to 904. It remains under the control of politicians, and this has led to claims of corruption and the public perception that ADMARC does not act in the best interests of those it is meant to assist. ADMARC expanded in the decade after 2002 and still exists because of the failure of the agro-dealer programme to create an efficient private sector marketing system. This does not mean that ADMARC is efficient: it was heavily criticised in early 2013 for allowing stored grain to rot in its silos at the same time as many went hungry for lack of maize in ADMARC markets. Had that maize been released on the market before it spoiled, it was claimed, it would have helped to lower prices and prevented many having to queue for scarce maize.

In 2017 the Malawi government was accused of providing money so that ADMARC could settle loans that it had obtained from local private banks to buy 98,000 metric tonnes maize needed because of the poor local harvest earlier in that year. However, the company's website later stated that this was necessary to enable it to be able to restart maize purchases and that, in the 2017/18 season, it had purchased 69,246 metric tons of this grain.

Further food shortages arose in the 2019-20 growing season and the Ministry of Finance, Economic Planning and Development estimated that 1,06 million out of an estimated rural population of 14.75 would have insufficient food to meet their annual requirement during that period. However, ADMARC lacked sufficient grain reserves or cash to be able to sell food at affordable prices.

== Published Sources ==
- D Banik and B Chinsinga, (2016). Political Transition and Inclusive Development in Malawi: The democratic dividend, Routledge. ISBN 978-1-13892-521-2.
- M J Blackie and A C Conroy, (2006) The Collapse of Agriculture, in A C Conroy, M J Blackie and others, Poverty, AIDS and Hunger: Breaking the Poverty Trap in Malawi, Palgrave. ISBN 978-1-40399-833-0.
- W R Chilowa, (1998). The Impact of Agricultural Liberalisation on Food Security in Malawi, Food Policy Vol. 23 No. 6.
- B Chinsinga, (2011). Agro-dealers, Subsidies and Rural Market Development in Malawi: A Political Economy Enquiry, Future Agricultures Working Paper 031.
- R E Christiansen and L A Stackhouse, (1989). The Privatisation of Agricultural Trading in Malawi, World Development Vol. 17 No. 5.
- A C Conroy, (2006) Malawi and the Poverty Trap, in A C Conroy, M J Blackie and others, Poverty, AIDS and Hunger: Breaking the Poverty Trap in Malawi, Palgrave. ISBN 978-1-40399-833-0.
- A Dorward and J Kydd, (2004). The Malawi 2002 Food Crisis: The Rural Development Challenge, The Journal of Modern African Studies Vol. 42 No, 3.
- E Green, (2002) Kudzitetza ku Njala: Liberalisation of the Agricultural Markets and its Impact on Smallholder Farmers: The Case of Malawi, Economic History Department of Lund University.
- E Green, (2007). Modern Agricultural History in Malawi: Perspectives on Policy-Choice Explanations, African Studies Review, Vol. 50, No. 3.
- J Harrigan, (2001). From Dictatorship to Democracy: Economic Policy in Malawi 1964-2000, Ashgate. ISBN 978-0-75461-252-0.
- C Hiebesch, (1986). Cereal Grain Crops, in A Hansen and D E McMillan (editors), Food in Sub-Saharan Africa, Lynne Rienner.
- T S Jayne, S Jones and Others, (1997). Maize Marketing and Pricing Policy in Eastern and Southern Africa in D Byerlee and C K Eicher (editors), Africa's Emerging Maize Revolution, Lynne Rienner.
- G S Kamchedzera, (1992) Land Tenure Relations in Law and Development in Malawi, in G C Mhone (editor), Malawi at the Crossroads: The Post-colonial Political Economy, Sapes Books.
- J Kydd, A Dorward and M Vaughan, (2002). The Humanitarian Crisis in Southern Africa: Malawi. A Submission to the International Development Committee, 2002.
- U Lele, (1988) Structural Adjustment, Agricultural Development and the Poor: Lessons from the Malawian Experience, International Bank for Reconstruction and Development.
- J G Liebenow, (1987). Food Self-sufficiency in Malawi: are Successes transferable? in M H Glanz (editor), Drought and Hunger in Africa: Denying Famine a Future, Cambridge University Press.
- J McCracken, (1984). Share-Cropping in Malawi: The Visiting Tenant System in the Central Province c. 1920-1968, in Malawi: An Alternative Pattern of Development, University of Edinburgh.
- E C Mandala, (2005). The End of Chidyerano: A History of Food and Everyday Life in Malawi, 1860-2004, Heinemann. ISBN 978-0-32507-021-6
- E C Mandala, (2006) Feeding and Fleecing the Native: How the Nyasaland Transport System distorted a New Food Market, 1890s to 1920s, The Journal of Southern African Studies Vol. 32 No. 3
- J Milner, (2004). Agricultural and Rural Development in Malawi, in T Takane (editor) Agricultural and Rural Development in Malawi: Macro and Micro Perspectives, Chiba Institute of Developing Economies.
- R M Mkandawire, (1992). The Land Question and Agrarian Change, in G C Mhone (editor), Malawi at the Crossroads: The Post-colonial Political Economy, Sapes Books.
- T Mkandawire, (1999). Agricultural Employment and Poverty in Malawi, The International Labour Organisation.
- C Ng'ong'ola, (1986), Malawi's Agricultural Economy and the Evolution of Legislation on the Production and Marketing of Peasant Economic Crops, Journal of Southern African Studies, Vol. 12, No. 2.
- M Smale and P W Heisey, (1997), Maize Technology and Productivity in Malawi, in D Byerlee and C K Eicher (editors), Africa's Emerging Maize Revolution, Lynne Rienner.
- L D Smith, (1995). Malawi: Reforming the State's Role in Agricultural Markets, Food Policy Vol. 20 No. 6.
- J K van Donge, (1995). Kamuzu's Legacy: The Democratization of Malawi, African Affairs Vol. 94 No.375.
- J K van Donge, (2002). Disordering the Market: The Liberalisation of Burley Tobacco in Malawi in the 1990s, The Journal of Southern African Studies Vol. 28 No.1.
- M Vaughan, (1987). The Story of an African Famine: Gender and Famine in Twentieth-Century Malawi, Cambridge University Press.
