= Tobacco industry in Malawi =

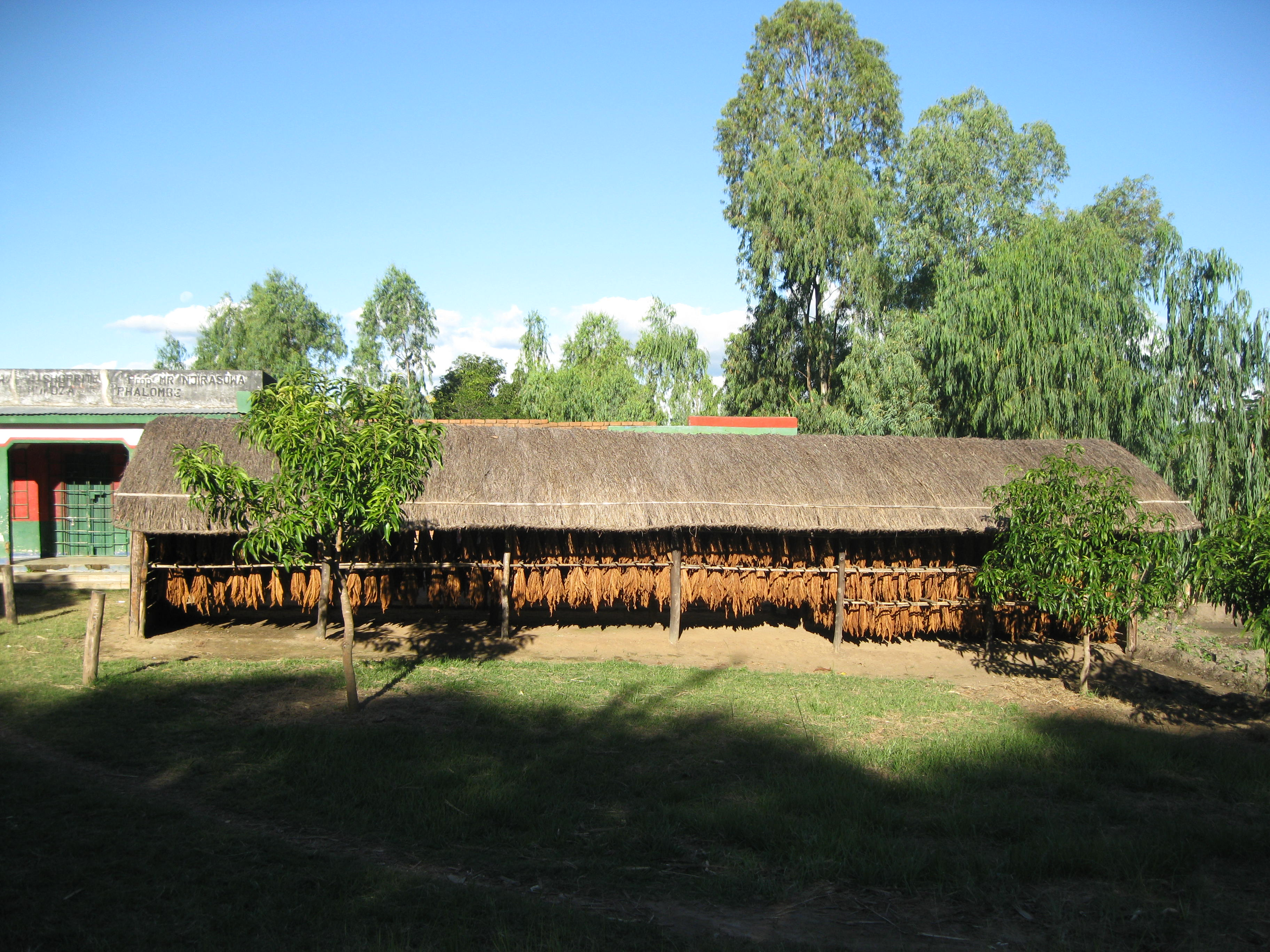
Drying tobacco leaves in Malawi

Tobacco production in Malawi is one of the nation's largest sources of income. As of 2005, Malawi was the twelfth-largest producer of tobacco leaves and the 7th largest global supporter of tobacco leaves. As of 2010, Malawi was the world's leading producer of burley leaf tobacco. With the decline of tobacco farms in the West, interest in Malawi's low-grade, high-nicotine tobacco has increased. Today, Malawian tobacco is found in blends of nearly every cigarette smoked in industrialized nations including the popular and ubiquitous Camel and Marlboro brands. It is the world's most tobacco dependent economy. In 2013 Malawi produced about 133,000 tonnes of tobacco leaf, a reduction from a maximum of 208,000 tonnes in 2009 and although annual production was maintained at similar levels in 2014 and 2015, prices fell steadily from 2013 to 2017, in part because of weakening world demand but also because of declining quality.

== History ==
Malawi began exporting tobacco in 1893, just two years after the British set up a colonial government in the landlocked territory known then as Nyasaland. Malawi gained independence in 1964 and Hastings Banda took control of the nation as president in 1966 and President for Life in 1970 until international pressures lead to the 1994 election that Banda lost. Banda was directly responsible for the creation of the Agricultural Development and Marketing Corporation (ADMARC) in 1971 with the new power to assist any public or private organization with capital, credit or other resources in any projects relating to the economic development of Malawi. ADMARC gave priority to a policy of the development of estates growing Burley tobacco, many controlled by Banda and senior officials and politicians. Smallholders had to support ADMARC's high operating costs and much of its profits came from underpaying them. It only re-invested 5% of funds in smallholder farms but subsidised estates: by the mid-1980s, ADMARC diverted two-thirds of its income into estates.

During Banda's presidency, Malawi was one of the poorest nations in Africa. During the 1970s, tobacco production shifted globally from the developed world to the developing world. The volatile economic state in Malawi made the government look favorably to the intensification of tobacco production. In Malawi, tobacco cultivation garnered 15,000 tons in 1961–1963. By the early 1970s, this number was up 90 percent to 29,000 tons.

The 1970s marked several changes for the tobacco industry in Malawi that would have a lasting effect on the industry today. International tobacco manufacturing companies identified Malawi in the 1970s as possible ally for fighting against tobacco control. In 1972, the government enacted the Special Crops Act that limited the production of tobacco, tea, and sugarcane to estate owners with no exceptions for small landholders. This restriction remained in effect until 1990.

Starting in 1989, labor and human rights activists began calling attention to the use of children in Malawian tobacco production. The Malawian Constitution, adopted in 1994, has provisions protecting children from interference with their education and economic exploitation. Malawi's Employment Act of 2000 states that the minimum age of employment is 14 years of age. British American Tobacco and Philip Morris, two of the largest purchasers of Malawian tobacco, issued labor policy statements in the early 2000s which stated their position against child labor. However, violations still occur in the country due to the lack of infrastructure and ability to enforce these regulations in the rural areas.

In 2002, Malawi experienced heavy flooding, causing President Bakili Muluzi to declare a state of national emergency. The agricultural sector was devastated including cash crops and food crops. Since a large amount of Malawi's agricultural sector is devoted to producing tobacco, the country experienced extreme food shortages resulting in famine and starvation. In 2010, the rainfall patterns were not favorable to tobacco growing. While the quality of tobacco leaves improved, the quantity of Malawian crop dropped 6.5 percent in 2010. However, the quality improvement was not sustained into the second decade of the century, as the costs of tobacco production went up after the government reduced then ended subsidies for fertilizer.

== Economic impact ==
Malawi had at one point relied heavily on tobacco production and sales to support its economy. Its reliance contributed to Malawi's vulnerable economic position on the global level. Though presently when looking at BOP the earnings from Tobacco stands at about 20% of the country earnings and about 50% of export earnings for the country. In the first decade of the century, Malawi was one of seven countries that derived at least one percent of export earnings from tobacco. Burley leaf from Malawi made up 6.6 percent of the world's tobacco exports and accounts for over 70 percent of Malawi's foreign earnings in 2005, but this had reduced to below 60% in 2010. Tobacco sales generated 165 million dollars per year for Malawi, with tobacco making up 53 percent of Malawi's exports. As the world demand for tobacco has decreased in the current decade, reducing producer and government revenues, the national economy has suffered since 2012.

=== Liberalization of tobacco ===
The liberalization of tobacco farming in Malawi in the early 1990s reversed the laws that had restricted growing burley tobacco to estates and prohibited small landowners from growing. After liberalization in 1990, Malawi reverted to a pre-liberalization allowance system that limited tobacco farmers' production to a certain productivity quota. The allowance system was abolished in 1996. In 1997, 22 percent of households produced burley leaf. By 2004, however, only 13 percent of growers did. The costs of owning land and having the labor to work the land are restrictive to small landowners.

== Growing and selling tobacco ==
Tobacco is produced in both large estates, concentrated in the central plateaus of the country, and in small landholdings throughout the country. These smaller farms average about one hectare (2 1/2 acres), about a third of the size of small tobacco-producing farms in the United States. For small farms with less than 0.40 hectares (1 acre) in tobacco cultivation, four out of five farms have a negative income. The other farms average an agricultural income of MK 3,000 or about 20 US dollars. It is estimated that about 60% of Malawi's burley tobacco farmers are smallholders who own their own land and 30% are estate or tenant farmers who work on land that they do not own, often on large tobacco estates. These are often trapped in a cycle of poverty as they are required to pay significant rents in cash or kind, may be required to sell their tobacco to the estate owners at low prices and buy fertilizer, tools and other essentials from them at inflated rates.

The sale of Malawi's tobacco is dominated by two global leaf-buying companies: Alliance One International and Universal Corporation, which are represented Lalawi by their subsidiaries, Alliance One Malawi and Limbe Leaf respectively. These two Malawi-based companies sell tobacco leaf to British American Tobacco, Imperial Tobacco, Japan Tobacco and Philip Morris International. Tobacco growers in Malawi have three options to sell their product. Tobacco growers can sell their product on auction floors through tobacco clubs. The unit price is high when sold at auction, but producers must have at least 100 kilogram. Growers can also sell directly to ADMARC, the Agricultural Development and Marketing Corporation. This practice fell out of favor after liberalization in the early 1990s.

== Labor sources ==
Given the importance of tobacco to the Malawian economy, a large number of Malawians are involved with production. Approximately 75 percent of the population depends on tobacco farming although only a small proportion of Malawians are smokers. Five million workers are indirectly employed in related industries or are family members of tobacco workers. Most tobacco farming in Malawi is small-scale, tenant farming. The landowner hires the farmer, but preference is for farmers with families that can supplement his labor.

=== Child labor ===
Malawi has been heavily criticized globally for the use of children in the labor force. Malawi has the highest occurrence of child labor in southern Africa. Approximately 89 percent of 5 to 14 year olds work in the agricultural sector. An estimated 78,000 children work on tobacco estates, often for long hours, low pay, and without protective clothing. Working with tobacco can lead to GTS or Green Tobacco Sickness. For children, the symptoms of nicotine poisoning, severe headaches, abdominal pain, muscle weakness, coughing and breathlessness are more pronounced because of their size. Child laborers absorb up to 54 milligrams of dissolved nicotine, which is comparable to smoking 50 cigarettes per day.

One concern for the developing nation is that eliminating child labor and replacing it with paid adult labor will increase the cost of production by 10 million dollars per year. While anti-child labor laws do exist, Malawi does not enforce these regulations effectively.

In December 2014, the updated version of the U.S. Department of Labor's List of Goods Produced by Child Labor or Forced Labor indicated that tobacco is a good still produced in such working conditions using both child labor and forced labor.

== Myths of the tobacco industry ==
The perception of the tobacco industry is more positive in Malawi than in many parts of the world because of the belief that the tobacco industries presence has a positive impact on Malawi's finances. The industry has supported and encouraged these beliefs. Compared to other industries, tobacco has one of the more developed infrastructures in Malawi with established market systems, research, and processing companies. The tobacco industry promotes the idea that tobacco brings wealth to the small landowners and Malawians, when in actuality it captures these farmers in a cycle of debts.

One of the major myths is that tobacco reduction is not a problem for developing nations. Tobacco reduction or increased regulation of the industry would result in loss of jobs. While this may be true, the extent to which it is so is contestable. The perception is also that higher taxes would result to smuggling and ultimately hurt the poor.

As of 2014, newly elected President Peter Mutharika was supporting diversification of Malawi's agriculture into other crops besides tobacco.

== Regulation ==
Although Malawi is badly affected by the negative consequences of smoking it has few policies on tobacco regulation and very little formal regulation of the tobacco industry and advertisement of tobacco in the country. There are no regulations on smoking in government buildings, educational facilities, health care facilities, transportation, restaurants and bars. While Malawi has one of the lowest incidences of smoking worldwide, annual cigarette consumption has increased steadily since the 1970s and more rapidly since the 1990s. The higher incidences of youth smoking than adults indicate that attempts, if any, to regulate youth smoking have not been successful.

Before the current decade there were few if any health warnings on cigarette packages, and if these were available, the warnings were often written in a language that the smoker could not understand, and in many cases, smokers bought loose cigarettes without seeing the package, as such sales are often a venture undertaken by young children. Although today cigarette packages may be labelled with warnings in both English and Chichewa (Kusuta kukhoza kuwononga Moyo) which in English translates to "Smoking is hazardous to health", these warnings are not mandatory, and (as of 2019) there are no legal restrictions on smoking in public places or on public transport and no restrictions on tobacco advertising or sponsorship. Notwithstanding any health warnings, there is still a huge increase on smoking in Malawi, which has not signed onto the World Health Organization Framework Convention on Tobacco Control despite pressure from tobacco control and anti-child labour advocates.

== Environmental impact ==
The tobacco industry has contributed to rapid deforestation of land—approximately 26% of deforestation in Malawi is attributed to tobacco production, one of the highest rates in the world. For each pound of tobacco produced, the farmer needs 20 pounds (9.1 kg) of wood. About 15% of Malawian tobacco is flue cured, a process that uses an intensive amount of wood. Crop diversification has stalled because of the impact of the tobacco industry on the Malawian government.

== The future ==
Malawi like other low-income tobacco-growing countries, particularly in Africa, has experienced far-reaching negative impacts from its past reliance on tobacco production, and the global decline in tobacco consumption is creating serious strains on its already weak economy. Internationally recognised Sustainable Development Goals advocate reducing a country's economic dependence on tobacco, reducing the number of families trapped in cycles of poverty and improving food security by supporting alternative sustainable livelihoods for tobacco growers. However, without external assistance, Malawi has only a limited capacity to develop economically effective alternatives to tobacco production. A start has been made, as the Malawi Development report for 2011–2016 stated: "... the objective will be to increase the country’s market share in traditional agricultural products such as sugar, cotton, coffee and tea as well as diversifying away from tobacco into wheat, cassava, macadamia nuts, fruits, pulses and vegetable commodities among others", although this required significant donor assistance.
