= Native Trust Land =

Category of land in Nyasaland Protectorate

Native Trust Land in colonial Nyasaland was a category of land held in trust by the Secretary of State for the Colonies and administered by the colonial governor for the benefit of African communities. In pre-colonial times, land belonged to the African communities that occupied it, and their members were free to use it in accordance with local customary law. In the late 19th century, large areas of fertile land were acquired by European settlers, and the remainder became Crown land, which the colonial government could alienate without the consent of the resident communities. To give a measure of protection to those communities, in 1916 land in Native Reserves, which then amounted to about a quarter of the land in the protectorate, was designated as Native Trust Land, to be held in trust for the benefit of African communities. Later, in 1936, all Crown Land except game or forest reserves or that used for public purposes became Native Trust Land, and Native Authorities were authorised to allocate Trust Land to their communities in accordance with customary law. After 1936, Native Trust Land constituted over 80% of the land in Nyasaland and most African farmers farmed Native Trust Land (renamed African Trust Land in 1950) from then until Nyasaland gained independence as Malawi in 1964 and after.

== Pre-colonial land ownership ==
In much of Malawi, the right of land ownership in pre-colonial times belonged under customary law to the African communities that occupied it. Community leaders could allocate the use of communal land to be used by its members, but in general they did so in accordance with custom, which generally prevented it being granted to outsiders. Neither the leaders nor the current members of a community could alienate its land, which they held in trust for future generations. In 1902, the Parliament of the United Kingdom enacted the British Central Africa Order, which provided that English Law (including land law) would apply generally in the British Central Africa Protectorate, and that the Crown had sovereignty over all the land in the protectorate, which was held by others as its tenants. Customary law had little or no legal status in the early colonial period and little recognition or protection was given to customary land or the communities that used it.

After 1860, the area that is now southern Malawi suffered insecurity through warfare and slave raiding: this led to the widespread abandonment fertile land. Local chiefs tried to gain protection from European companies and settlers who had entered the area from the 1860s by granting them the right to cultivate this abandoned, insecure land. The African Lakes Company, formed in 1877 to cooperate with the missions established in central Africa by combating the slave trade and introducing legitimate trade, claimed to have made treaties or agreements with several chiefs. Some of these treaties claimed to have transferred sovereignty to the company, which may have had the ambition to become a Chartered company. Three others individuals also claimed to have purchased large areas of land. Eugene Sharrer claimed to have acquired 363,034 acres, and he had attempted to induce chiefs to give up their sovereign rights: he also possibly intended to form his own Chartered company. Alexander Low Bruce, the son-in-law of David Livingstone and a director of the African Lakes Company, claimed 176,000 acres, and John Buchanan and his brothers claimed a further 167,823 acres. These lands were purchased for trivial quantities of goods under agreements signed by chiefs with no understanding of English concepts of land tenure.

== The Colonial Land Settlement ==
The British government appointed Harry Johnston, later Sir Harry, as commissioner and consul-general of the British Central Africa Protectorate from 1891. Johnston rejected the suggestion that any agreements made before the protectorate was established could transfer sovereignty to individuals or companies. However, he did accept that these agreements might be evidence of land sales. The prevailing legal theory in the 1880s was that the Crown's authority in any British protectorate was limited to the management of its external relations and the affairs of British subjects. Protected Africans retained their internal sovereignty, and were only subject to Crown control if, and to the extent, agreed on in treaties and concessions. The mere proclamation of a protectorate did not give the Crown property in its land or minerals, unless the agreements with African rulers so provided.

Before the British Central Africa Protectorate was proclaimed in June 1891, Johnston had only made treaties of friendship with local chiefs; these did not surrender sovereignty to the Crown, and he did not consider that the Crown had a general claim to sovereign ownership of any land unless this had been expressly transferred by cession. Without sovereignty, the Crown had no right to alienate that land. The treaties that he made from July 1891 did cede sovereignty over land in the areas concerned, but they granted the chiefs and people involved the right to retain the land that they actually occupied, leaving all the unoccupied land free for the Crown to dispose of. The treaties that included the cessation of land rights covered less than half of the Protectorate. Although the protectorate had been proclaimed on the understanding that British South Africa Company would contribute to the costs of its administration, Johnson, resisted the company's demand that Crown lands where sovereignty had been ceded, which formed over 20% of the land of the protectorate, should be transferred to its control and that Johnson should also facilitate the transfer of lands remaining in African hands, amounting to over 40% of total land, to it (the remaining 15% was already in European ownership). This would have created a situation on the South African model, with African confined to limited reserves.

Although Johnston accepted that the land belonged to its African communities, so their chiefs had no right to alienate it to anyone, he put forward the legal fiction that each chief's people had tacitly accepted he could assume such a right. Under this interpretation chiefs could cede land to the Crown or sell or grant land not currently being used by the community to Europeans. Johnston also claimed that the Crown had two rights as the Protecting Power. Firstly, that any "waste" land (if not currently in use or occupied) was Crown Land and freehold or leasehold titles over it could be granted to Europeans. This, however disregarded African practices of cultivation, in which only a part of a family's land would be cultivated at any time, with the greater part left fallow to be used in the future. Secondly, that the Crown was entitled to investigate whether any earlier sales or transfers were valid and, if they were, to issue a Certificate of Claim (in effect a registration of freehold title) in the land to the new owners. The land comprised in the Certificates of Claim amounted to some 1.4 million Hectares, including a claim in North Nyasa district of just over 1 million Hectares; the rest was mainly in the Shire Highlands. Johnston had no legal training and the protectorate had no law officers until 1896. However, when the legality of the Certificates of Claim system was challenged in 1903 on the basis that the agreements made by the chiefs breached the rights of their community members, the Appeals Court upheld the validity of the certificates, ruling that that title arose from a grant by the Crown's representative, not from any agreements made by the chiefs. The court did however judge that many aspects of the agreements were unfair and one-sided.

Johnston recorded that his review of land claims begun in late 1892 was necessary because the proclamation of the protectorate had been followed by a wholesale land grab, with huge areas of land bought for trivial sums and many claims overlapping or requiring adjustment. He regarded long occupation and improvement of the land as the best way to justify a claim, but it only rarely happened. Failing this, he or an assistant sought confirmation that the chiefs named in agreements had agreed to sell the land and had received a fair return for the sale. However, his estimates of land value were very low, from a halfpenny an acre for indifferent land up to a maximum of threepence an acre in the most favoured districts. The existing African villages and farms were exempted from these sales, and the villagers were told that their homes and fields were not being alienated. In addition, most Certificates of Claim included a non-disturbance clause providing that existing African villages and planted areas were not to be disturbed without consent from the protectorate government.

== African Land Rights ==
The non-disturbance clauses were largely ineffective, firstly because the landowners routinely ignored them with impunity, secondly because the land occupied by Africans at the date of the certificate was not recorded and thirdly, the practice of shifting cultivation meant that much of what Johnston thought was unoccupied or waste land near villages was temporarily out of use and resting under local variants of the Chitemene system that is still employed in parts of Zambia. No protection was offered to Africans living outside the area of Certificates of Claim, but subsistence cultivators on Crown land were allowed to continue on their holdings unless and until the land was sold or leased to settlers. As all Crown lands were potentially available for settler expansion, villagers living on as yet unalienated land felt insecure.

In the early years of the protectorate, owners usually did not object to Africans resident on their estates practising shifting cultivation and moving their fields every few years, as they wanted to retain existing residents and attract new ones as a workforce. However, any new residents were obliged to provide unpaid labour in lieu of rent for the land they occupied under the system of thangata. Although original residents were, at least in theory, exempt from this form of labour rent, once cotton started to be grown commercially after 1901, followed by widespread planting of tobacco from 1905, this exemption came under attack. Both crops needed a great deal of labour during their growing seasons, and owners attempted to reduce all residents to the status of insecure labour tenants, who could be evicted at will. This situation was not finally resolved until the colonial administration's Natives on Private Estates Ordinance 1928 removed the distinction between descendants of original residents and others by abolishing non-disturbance clauses.

After 1900, the view which gained prominence among Foreign Office lawyers was that the former theory of protectorate only applied to those declared over more civilised communities and that the mere declaration of a protectorate over what in one case were termed "semi-barbarous natives" gave Crown officers in that protectorate the right to dispose of land there. An Order-in-Council for government of the British Central Africa Protectorate issued in 1902 declared that all rights related to Crown lands were vested in the commissioner, and it empowered him to dispose of any such land. Crown lands were defined as all public lands in the Protectorate under the control of the Crown through any treaty or agreement.

The effect of the British Central Africa Order, 1902 was that all land not in private European ownership became Crown land which the colonial government could alienate: this covered about 85% of the protectorate's land area. Alfred Sharpe, who was commissioner then governor from 1896 to 1910, favoured a policy of creating reserves limited to those areas required for African subsistence, and allowing any land not required for subsistence to be alienated for commercial farming. In 1904, he received powers to reserve areas of Crown Land for the African people under the Native Locations Ordinance, 1904. His successor as governor from 1911 to 1913, William Manning, who had previously served in the protectorate from 1893 to 1902, was more sympathetic to African farmers, and opposed moving them into minimal reserves to clear land for European settlers. By 1913, the Native Reserves covered 6.6 million acres out the 22.3 million acres of land in the protectorate, and a further 2.6 million acres of Crown Land were planned to become future reserves. These areas and the private estates encompassed nearly all the land which seemed capable of cultivation. The population was growing and concerns about future land availability started a debate about the respective needs of European and African communities for land.

== The creation of Native Trust Land ==
The Land Registration Ordinance of 1916 recognised the Native Reserves as Native Trust Land, to be held in trust for the benefit of African communities. The 1916 Ordinance did not provide for the administration of Trust Land by African communities or their leaders, as formal indirect rule was only introduced in 1933–34, although, in practice, chiefs had day-to-day charge of land distribution. It was not until the Nyasaland Protectorate (Native Trust Lands) Order, 1936 that any conversion of Trust Land to freehold was prohibited. The 1936 Order declared that all Crown Land except game or forest reserves or that used for public purposes would become Native Trust Land, and authorised Native Authorities to allocate Trust Land to their communities in accordance with customary law. This reflected the Colonial Office rejection to the Report of the 1920 Land Commission (which was not approved as it interfered with native land rights). The Land Commission was one of a number of bodies that tried to bring order to the confusion over land rights in Nyasaland. Its report opposed formal reserves, but recommended a calculation of what land should be provided for present and future African subsistence agriculture and making much of the rest available for European settlement. It also wanted curbs on Africans cultivating economic crops, which was also aimed at promoting European agriculture. The report of an East Africa Lands Commission in 1924-5 favoured a reserve system similar to that of Kenya, with a Native Lands Trust Board to oversee the reserves. An Ordinance for this purpose was enacted in 1927, and certain areas were designated as "Crown lands for the settlement of Natives", but this did little to change existing arrangements and, as some commercial development by settlers was considered useful, there was provision for some land alienation, in the form of 99-year leases. After a review of pre-1891 land claims following the Report of the Natives Reserve Commission, 1929, the Colonial Office believed that the Crown had a very uncertain title to land comprised in any treaty where sovereignty had not been ceded expressly. It did not propose to return any land to African ownership but wished to hold it and other former Crown land in Trust for Africans.

The 1936 Native Trust Land Order classified land as Crown, Reserved, and Native Trust lands. Crown Land was defined as including all lands and interests in land acquired or occupied by or on behalf of the Crown. Reserved lands covered land occupied under Certificates of Claim (previously classified as private land) and any land subsequently granted or leased out of Crown lands. Reserved lands also included forest reserves and land in township areas. All other land became Native Trust Land. This was vested in the Secretary of State for the Colonies, but administered by the governor for the use and common benefit of the natives. The 1936 Order recognised that Africans could occupy and use Native Trust Land as a matter of right, but no other racial group in the protectorate was similarly entitled. The Governor could, however, grant a right of occupancy of Native Trust land to a member of any racial group, normally as a lessee. Subsequently, the 1950 Order-in-Council restyled Native Trust Land as African Trust Land (as the word "native" had pejorative connotations), Crown Land as Public Land, and Reserved lands as Private Land. This structure remained in place until independence in 1964. African Trust Land was now vested in the governor for the use and common benefit of the Africans. The authorities controlling land use and occupation were African chiefs and headmen, and African customs and laws were recognised as the governing law.

The aims of the 1936 Native Trust Land Order included reassuring the African people of Nyasaland of their rights in the land they occupied, and relieving them of fears of its alienation without their consent. These aims were incompatible with the view that the African people of Nyasaland had only a limited entitlement to as much land as was deemed sufficient for them: the view of the 1920 Land Commission. From 1936, Native Treasuries created under the Native Authorities Courts Treasuries Ordinance were to receive 25% of all leasehold rents collected for Native Trust Land from leases in their Native Authority area. The remaining 75% of rents went to a central fund that topped-up the Treasuries of districts in deficit. In the late colonial period, a major part of post-war colonial policy was the creation of a class of independent smallholders with a secure but negotiable title to their land. This was the aim of the Master Farmer Scheme, which had limited success, producing only 282 Master Farmers after four years. Most Africans continued to farm Native Trust Land.
