= 2010 FIFA World Cup event effects =

The 2010 FIFA World Cup is the 19th FIFA World Cup, the premier international association football tournament, being held in South Africa from 11 June to 11 July. It is the first time the finals of the tournament have been staged in an African host nation as South Africa were selected as hosts following a bidding in 2004. The impact of the event itself transcend those bound by its athletic aspect and appeal, and the socioeconomic aspects of the tournament are far reaching.

== Social effects ==
=== Security ===
Tournament organiser Danny Jordaan dismissed concerns that the attack on the Togo national team which took place in Angola in January 2010, had any relevance to the security arrangements for the World Cup. There have been claims that the police have implemented a de facto state of emergency by banning protests during the event.

Major General Qassim al-Moussawi of Iraq's security services said the arrest of Abdullah Azzam Saleh al-Qahtani, allegedly a former Saudi army lieutenant, yielded information that "He was planning a terrorist act in South Africa during the World Cup based on plans issued by the central al Qaeda terrorist organisation in coordination with Osama bin Laden's first assistant, Ayman al-Zawahri."

There were also reports of thefts against visitors to the country for the World Cup. Tourists from China, Portugal, Spain, South Korea, Japan and Colombia had become victim to crimes. Three members of the Greece national team reported that £1,300 had been stolen from their rooms. These reports came after the British media cautioned visitors about such security threats.

In Iraq, the improved security situation has allowed people to watch matches in public places. This is in contrast to 2006 when violence prevented people from gathering publicly. Radical militant groups in Somalia have banned the watching of televised World Cup matches, and had initially threatened to punish with public floggings, declaring the World Cup a waste of time and resources and un-Islamic. There were reports that groups had arrested people for watching the World Cup. The group denied reports of arresting people, but said that they were chasing people out of video halls.

On 18 June after the match between England and Algeria a fan was able to break through the FIFA-appointed security staff at Green Point stadium and gain access to the England team dressing room. The breach took place shortly after Prince William and Prince Harry had left the room. The trespasser was then released before he could be handed over to the Police. The Football Association lodged a formal complaint with FIFA and demanded that security be increased.

==== Evictions ====
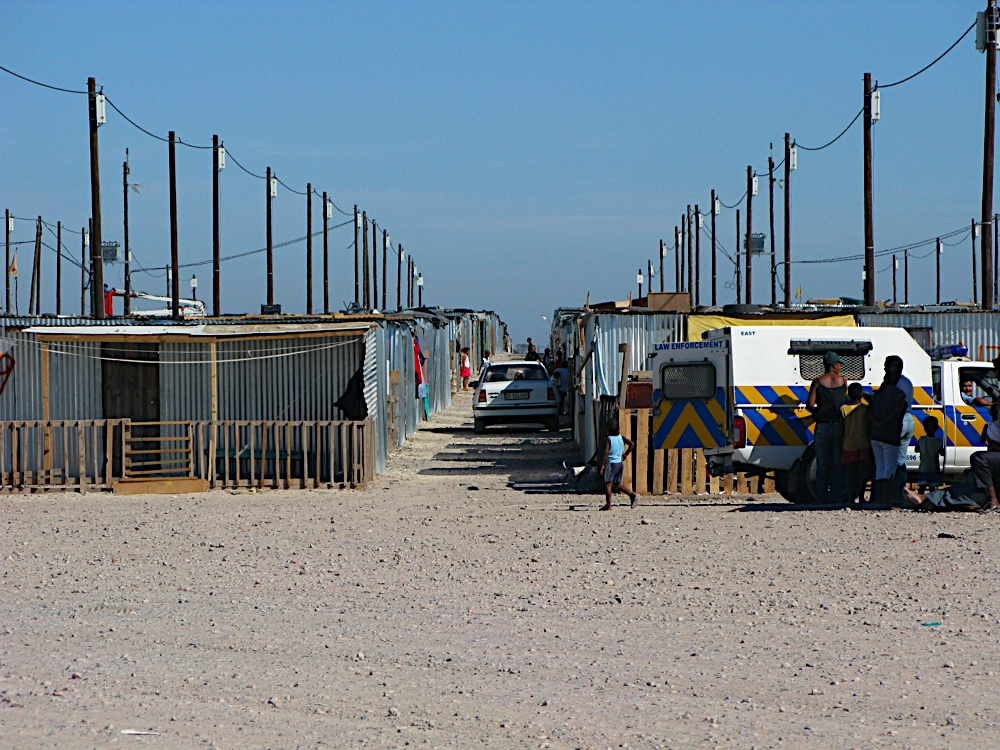
Police patrol Blikkiesdorp, a settlement for the evicted

As with many 'hallmark events' throughout the world, the 2010 FIFA World Cup has been connected to evictions, which many claim are meant to 'beautify the city', impress visiting tourists, and hide shackdwellers. On 14 May 2009, the Durban-based shack-dwellers' movement Abahlali baseMjondolo took the KwaZulu-Natal government to court over their controversial Elimination and Prevention of Re-Emergence of Slums Act, meant to eliminate slums in South Africa and put homeless shackdwellers in transit camps in time for the 2010 World Cup. They have gained a lot of publicity for their efforts, even in the international media. Abahlali baseMjondolo have threatened to build shacks outside of the Cape Town stadium to draw attention to their situation.

Another prominent controversy surrounding preparations for the World Cup is the N2 Gateway housing project in Cape Town, which plans to remove over 20,000 residents from the Joe Slovo Informal Settlement along the busy N2 Freeway and build rental flats and bond-houses in its place in time for the 2010 World Cup. The residents would be moved to the poverty stricken Delft township on the outskirts of the city and out of sight from the N2 Freeway. There has been particular concern about forced removals to the Blikkiesdorp camp in Delft and that in Durban, children are being forcibly removed from the city centre.

In July 2009, South Africa was hit with rolling protests by poor communities that demanded access to basic services, jobs, adequate housing and the democratisation of service delivery. These protests have been linked to the World Cup as protesters complain that public funds are being diverted away from social issues to build stadiums and upgrade airports. Fears have been expressed that the growing protests by shack dwellers could result in the tournament being disrupted. Some grassroots social movements have called for a boycott of the event.

==== Blikkiesdorp ====
Blikkiesdorp has become well known for its high crime rate, its substandard living conditions, and its extremely hot or cold, windy and sandy living environment. NGOs, international human rights organisations, and the Anti-Eviction Campaign have publicly criticised the conditions in Blikkiesdorp and how they say it is used to reinforce the eviction of poor families especially to make way for the 2010 World Cup. Residents also threatened to burn down Blikkiesdorp before the World Cup begins because of the bad conditions in the settlement.

==== Xenophobic Violence ====
There were widespread reports in the local press that there would be mass planned violence against migrants at the conclusion of the tournament. This did not happen.

=== HIV/AIDS ===
South Africans and others expressed concern that the World Cup would stimulate the illicit sex trade. Football fans were warned that South Africa has one of the worst HIV infection rates in the world with up to half the country's sex workers HIV positive and the British government gave £1 million to buy 42 million condoms. However, AIDS campaigners accused FIFA of blocking the distribution of condoms at football grounds.

== Economic effects ==
=== Non-FIFA events ===
In November 2009 it was reported that a rugby mid-year Test match between the Springboks and France scheduled to take place in Cape Town on 12 June 2010 would be moved to Europe, due to FIFA regulations banning other sport events in host cities during the time of the World Cup. After negotiations between the South African Rugby Union and members of the local organising committee, it was announced that the Test would be allowed to take place in Cape Town on the originally scheduled date because no World Cup match was to be played in Cape Town on that day, and the Test would be played at Newlands, which is not a World Cup venue.

=== FIFA trademarks ===
The South African low-fare airline Kulula.com were ordered by FIFA to withdraw an advertisement that it claimed infringed their trademarks. The advert, titled "The unofficial carrier of the you-know-what", features soccer balls, vuvuzelas and the flag of South Africa, which FIFA claims when used in conjunction with each other constitutes an infringement of its trademarks. Kulula.com disputed FIFA's claim, but later announced that they would withdraw the specific advert whilst continuing with the advertisement campaign.

=== Broadcast rights and fees ===
In Singapore, FIFA's broadcast rights fees for the 2010 World Cup finals have been described as "exorbitant", with the organisation having changed prices according to what it perceived the country's TV operators were willing to pay. When Singapore TV operators SingTel and Starhub joined together to bid for the broadcast rights in late 2009, they were reportedly charged an initial S$40 million (about US$30 million). When the Singapore TV operators refused to pay the initial sum quoted by FIFA, and as time passed, Singapore was faced with the prospect of being one of the few countries not to get match broadcasts from the 2010 World Cup.

With only about a month left before the tournament, FIFA finally relented and reportedly reduced the fee to S$21 million (US$15 million), which was then accepted by the Singapore TV operators. This reduced fee was still significantly higher than the fee that FIFA charged Starhub for the exclusive rights to broadcast the 2006 World Cup in Germany, which was reported to be S$15 million (US$11 million).

This increased fee for the 2010 World Cup tournament broadcast rights resulted in the Singapore TV operators passing on the cost to their subscribers, which were then charged a special fee of S$94 (US$68) in addition to existing contracts, to watch the tournament's games. This high additional fee was the most expensive in the region, and angered Singapore football fans. Singapore was more expensive when compared to countries in the region that will either be broadcasting the matches free of charge, as in the case of Indonesia and Thailand; or at significantly lower viewing fees, at US$21 in Malaysia and US$38 in Hong Kong. This fee is also almost four times the S$25 (US$18) special fee that Starhub charged its subscribers for viewing the 2006 World Cup finals matches in Germany. As a result, many fans decided to protest against the increased fees with a mass boycott of the 2010 World Cup broadcast service by both operators.

=== Local vendors ===
Local vendors were prohibited from selling food and merchandise within a 1.5 km radius of any stadium hosting a World Cup Match. For a vendor to operate within the radius a registration fee of 60,000 South African Rand, equivalent to 7,888 US dollars, had to be paid FIFA. This fee was out of most local vendors' reach, as they are simple one-man-operated vendors. This prevented international visitors from experiencing local South African food. Some local vendors felt cheated out an opportunity of financial gain and spreading South African culture, in favour of multinational corporations.

== Match effects ==
=== Vuvuzelas ===
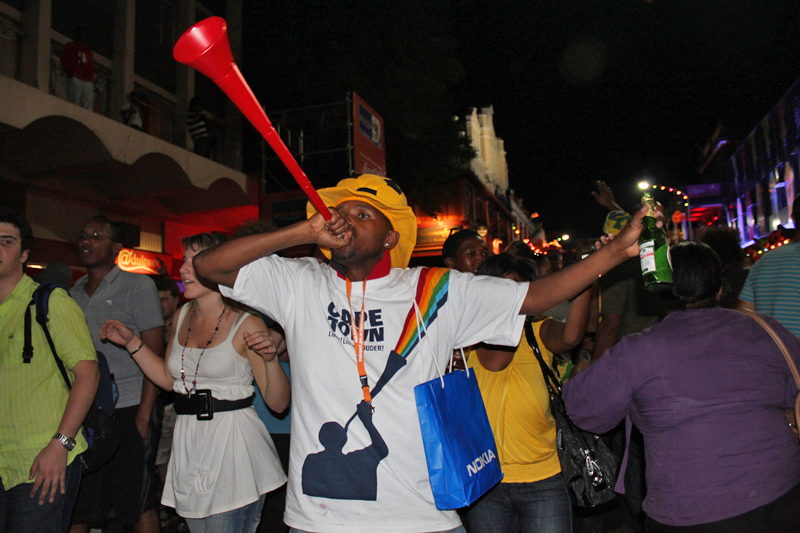
A vuvuzela being played

During the World Cup events many competitors have criticised and complained about the noise caused by the vuvuzela horns, including France's Patrice Evra who blamed the horns for the team's poor performance. He also claimed that the sound of the vuvuzelas away from the stadiums hampered the ability of the players to get their rest. Other critics include Lionel Messi who complained that the sound of the vuvuzelas hampered communication among players on the pitch, and broadcasting companies, which complained that commentators' voices were being drowned out by the sound. Cristiano Ronaldo went on record to state that the sound of the vuvuzelas disturbed the teams' concentration.

Others watching on television have complained that the ambient audio feed from the stadium only contains the sounds of the vuvuzelas and the natural sounds of people in the stands are drowned out. A spokesperson for the ESPN network said it was taking steps to minimize the noise of the crowd on its broadcasts. Portuguese telecommunications company Portugal Telecom announced on 16 June an offer of an alternative audio feed, in which the vuvuzela sound is edited out, to the customers of its Pay-TV service called MEO.

When asked a few days into the tournament whether consideration would be given to banning vuvuzelas during matches, South African organising chief Danny Jordaan replied, "if there are grounds to do so, yes" and that "if any land on the pitch in anger we will take action."

=== Ticketing and attendance ===
Some first-round games suffered from large blocks of unoccupied stands, including one match with nearly 11,000 empty seats. FIFA reported that group ticket purchases went unused, and that current attendance levels were in fact second only to the 1994 event during the early round period.
