= Pierre de Vos =

South African constitutional law scholar

- Born: Pierre Francois de Vos; 29 June 1963 (age 63); Messina, Transvaal, South Africa
- Occupation: Professor
- Employer: University of Cape Town
- Relatives: Anna-Marie de Vos (sister)

Academic background
- Education: Stellenbosch University; Columbia Law School; University of the Western Cape
- Thesis: Sexual Orientation, the Right to Equality and South Africa's 1996 Constitution (1990)

Academic work
- Discipline: Constitutional law
- Website: constitutionallyspeaking.co.za

Pierre Francois de Vos (born 29 June 1963) is a South African constitutional law academic. He holds the Claude Leon Foundation Chair in Constitutional Governance at the University of Cape Town (UCT). Before taking up that position in July 2009, he taught at the University of the Western Cape. He is popularly known for his blog, Constitutionally Speaking, which he has written since November 2006.

== Early life and education ==
On 29 June 1963, de Vos was born in Messina in the former Northern Transvaal (now Musina, Limpopo). He grew up in a Afrikaans-speaking Christian family with four sisters. His father, also named Pierre, was a lawyer, and his parents were verligte Nationalists during apartheid. After a period in Hennenman, Free State, his family returned to the Transvaal, and he matriculated at Pietersburg High School in Pietersburg.

After high school, he attended Stellenbosch University, where he completed a BComm in law, an LLB, and an LLM cum laude. He lived at the Wilgenhof residence for his first two undergraduate years, in 1984 and 1985. Later in his undergraduate career, he joined the National Union of South African Students, the End Conscription Campaign, and the editorial board of Die Matie. He was also influenced by Laurie Ackermann, who was one of his professors. Upon leaving Stellenbosch, he completed a second LLM at Columbia Law School in New York and an LLD at the University of the Western Cape. His doctoral dissertation, completed in 2000, was about sexual orientation and the right to equality in the post-apartheid Constitution.

== Academic career ==
Between 1993 and 2009, de Vos taught constitutional law at the University of the Western Cape, where he was appointed as associate professor in 2000 and full professor in 2003. On 1 July 2009, he took office as the Claude Leon Foundation Chair in Constitutional Governance at the University of Cape Town. He was also the Deputy Dean of the university's law faculty from January 2011 to December 2013. His research interests include sexual orientation discrimination and same-sex marriage, the enforcement of social and economic rights, HIV/AIDS, race and racism, and other human rights issues.

He is board chairperson of the Aids Legal Network, a non-governmental human rights organisation, and a board member of the Triangle Project, an LGBT advocacy organisation. He is also a member of the advisory council of the Council for the Advancement of the South African Constitution.

== Public scholarship ==
Since November 2006, de Vos has written a popular blog called Constitutionally Speaking, which primarily provides constitutional perspectives on South African social and political issues. His blog posts are also published by the Daily Maverick and by the Mail & Guardian's Thought Leader. Both for his blog and for his popular commentary in other national and international media, the University of Cape Town awarded de Vos its Social Responsiveness Award in 2013.

== Political views ==
A vocal supporter of land rights movement Abahlali baseMjondolo, de Vos was critical of the government's attempt to evict residents of Joe Slovo Informal Settlement from the N2 Gateway site, as well as of the Constitutional Court's decision upholding their eviction in Residents of Joe Slovo. In August 2011, he endorsed a call by Archbishop Emeritus Desmond Tutu for a once-off wealth tax on apartheid's beneficiaries, and in 2024 he endorsed the introduction of inheritance tax. He also called publicly for reform at his alma mater, Stellenbosch University.

His commentary has frequently led him into conflict with prominent politicians and lawyers. In 2008 de Vos wrote a scathing column in Thought Leader about opposition leader Helen Zille's decision to challenge the constitutionality of the Erasmus Commission. In September 2008, however, the Western Cape High Court upheld the challenge in City of Cape Town v Premier, and de Vos wrote to apologise to Zille. Nonetheless he continued to criticise Zille's policies and public statements in later years.

In June 2009, de Vos and Paul Ngobeni engaged in a heated debate on SAFM about the prospect of Western Cape Judge President John Hlophe's elevation to the Constitutional Court. Ngobeni, a supporter of Hlophe, accused de Vos of being a racist who hated Hlophe and congratulated him on joining his university colleagues in "a group of gangsters who make Hlophe their do-or-die issue".

In July 2018, de Vos wrote a blog suggesting that lawyer Dali Mpofu had behaved unethically in advancing dishonest arguments on behalf of his client Tom Moyane during the Nugent Commission. Mpofu posted a series of angry ripostes on Twitter, alleging that de Vos's piece was "defamatory, insulting & possibly racist" and threatening to sue him if he did not delete it. De Vos refused.

== Personal life ==
De Vos came out as gay in 1993. He also identifies as atheist and does not identify as an Afrikaner.

His sister, Anna-Marie, is a prominent advocate; she was a plaintiff in Du Toit v Minister of Welfare and Population Development, an LGBT discrimination case that was heard in the Constitutional Court in 2002.

=== Equality Act lawsuit ===
In February 2004, de Vos and his partner, Coloured actuary Marcus Pillay, became the first plaintiffs to enter a case in the newly established Equality Court. They alleged that Pillay had been denied entry to a bar in Cape Town gay village de Waterkant because of his race. The court ordered a settlement, in terms of which the bar and its bouncers paid R13,000 to Siyazenzela, a non-profit advocacy organisation nominated by Pillay, and the bar's owners released a written apology admitting that their admission policy was discriminatory and contravened the Equality Act.

=== Controversies ===
In September 2022, De Vos's Twitter account retweeted a post depicting child sexual abuse. De Vos said that his account had been hacked and deleted the Tweet, but AfriForum said it would lay private criminal charges against him for distributing child pornography. After the National Prosecuting Authority declined to prosecute, AfriForum continued to press for law-enforcement action, and in November 2024 the Deputy Director of Public Prosecutions in the Eastern Cape said that her office would review the prosecution decision.

== Bibliography ==
=== Fiction ===
- de Vos, Pierre (1994). Slegs Blankes / Whites Only (in Afrikaans). Pretoria: Kagiso Literêr. ISBN 9780798634748.
- de Vos, Pierre (2018). Scene of the Crime in As You Like It. Johannesburg: Jacana Media. ISBN 9781431426669.

=== Non-fiction ===
- de Vos, Pierre; Freedman, Warren, eds. (2014). South African Constitutional Law in Context. Oxford University Press. ISBN 9780195991376.
