= The Value of Nothing =

Book by Raj Patel published in 2010

- Author: Raj Patel
- Language: English
- Genre: Non-fiction
- Publisher: Picador
- Publication date: 2010
- ISBN: 978-0-312-42924-9

The Value of Nothing: How to Reshape Market Society and Redefine Democracy is a book by Raj Patel about the economic crisis and its effect on consumers. It was published in 2010.

The Value of Nothing was on The New York Times best-seller list during February 2010 and has received many positive reviews from academics, activists, and journalists.

== Translated editions ==
- Greek: Η αξία των πραγμάτων, Αγορές και δημοκρατικόί θεσμοί (2012)

== See also ==
- Stuffed and Starved: The Hidden Battle for the World Food System, by Raj Patel (2008)
- No Land! No House! No Vote! Voices from Symphony Way, by the Symphony Way Pavement Dwellers (2011)
