= N2 Gateway occupations =

The N2 Gateway Occupations saw large numbers of government-built houses occupied illegally by local residents of Delft in the Western Cape during December, 2007. The houses in question were the new Breaking New Ground (BNG) houses in the Symphony section of Delft near the main road Symphony Way. This was the largest occupation of houses in South Africa's history.

== Occupation ==
The BNG houses were originally promised to backyard dwellers in the area. After the January 2005 fire in Joe Slovo Informal Settlement, 1000 Joe Slovo families were moved to Transit Camps in Delft and promised priority in the allocation of N2 Gateway housing in Delft.

The houses were occupied by backyard dwellers and other mostly poor residents in and around Delft on 19 December 2007. After the occupation, it emerged that a local DA councillor, Frank Martin, had encouraged local families to occupy the houses. Though the charges against Martin were later dropped, what ensued was a high-profile political fight between the ANC and DA, each accusing the other of racism, playing party politics, and using the poor for their own gain. Police and a private security company began evicting residents on 24 December but were ordered to stop after the Cape High Court said that the evictions were illegal because the sheriff was using an eviction order granted to the City of Cape Town in October 2006 against other people.

== Legal ==
Litigation resumed in January 2008 and on 5 February, the Cape High Court granted an eviction order. The judge ignored the section of the 1999 PIE Act which requires reasonable alternative accommodation to be provided to people who are evicted with nowhere else to go on the basis that they could find accommodation where they came from. As part of the order, the judge also faulted Frank Martin for instigating the occupation and who pledge no contest to allegations during the trial. Residents attempted to appeal the eviction order on 15 February and their appeal was rejected without a hearing.

== Eviction ==
The eviction order went into effect at 5 am, 19 February 2008, the next day after Judge Van Zyl refused to hear the residents' appeal. During the evictions, police used stun grenades and rubber bullets against crowds protesting their eviction orders. At least 20 residents were injured.

After the evictions, about 1000 families slept in the open. They eventually chose to either occupy Symphony Way or set up camp in a nearby open space. The latter group eventually were moved to a newly built Temporary Relocation Area (TRA) nicknamed Blikkiesdorp which was built by the City of Cape Town. The families living on Symphony Way have refused to be moved to any TRA and continue to occupy the road.

On February 18, 2009, a City of Cape Town disciplinary committee found Martin guilty of encouraging people to invade homes at Delft. As punishment, Martin was suspended for one month, while former supporters of the councillor expressed outrage and called for him to be fired.

== Reports on the N2 Gateway house occupation ==
- 2009 Report on the N2 Gateway by the Centre on Housing Rights and Evictions (COHRE)
- Western Cape Housing Crisis: Writings on Joe Slovo and Delft by Martin Legassick, February 2008

== See also ==
- N2 Gateway
- Symphony Way Informal Settlement
- Pictures of Delft evictions
- Video of Delft Evictions
