= Chisangano =

- Location in Malawi
- Coordinates: 11°17′S 33°53′E
- Country: Malawi
- Region: Northern Region
- District: Mzimba District
- Elevation: 3,661 ft (1,116 m)
- Time zone: +2

Chisangano is a village in Northern Malawi near Ekwendeni. The rural village has a school with 700 students from 300 families.

== Description ==
The rural village has 300 families and they supply 700 pupils to the primary school.

The effects of climate change are documented in the area. There was a single borehole for water and when it breaks then the only alternative is to fetch contaminated water with a six hour round trip. In 2023 they partnered with a church in Bishopton, Scotland to fix the problem. Villagers helped to dig the trenches and they fed the workers as the pipe was installed resulting in several taps in the village.

There is a local group called Soils, Food and Healthy Communities (SFHC) based at Ekwendeni. The group conducts agriculturist studies, it tries new recipes and new crops. They have experimented with multi-cropping where a range of crops are planted in the same land. The locals have also adopted clay ovens which are locally manufactured. They require less wood to heat the food.

Chisangano is one of four locations with experimental crops and SFHC weather stations. 25 families are involved in each village with an emphasis on gender inclusion. Another is at the village of Bwabwa which has experience, like Chisangano, with agroecology, the other two Kabwanda and Zombwe are later additions to the work. The principle investigators are SFHC's Laifolo Dakishoni and Professor Rachel Bezner Kerr of Cornell University.

In 2021 the film, The Ants and the Grasshopper was released about local farmer Anita Chitaya. She lives 15 km away in Bwabwa and she had inspired the film and co-written the script about the effect of climate change in their area.
