= Frank Martin (councillor) =

Frank Martin is a former Democratic Alliance councillor for the 19th Ward in the City of Cape Town which includes Blue Downs, Kuilsrivier, Wesbank and a small eastern section of Delft.

== N2 Gateway occupations ==
Martin rose to prominence during the December 2007 N2 Gateway occupations of BNG houses in the new Symphony area of Delft. The N2 Gateway Occupations saw large numbers of government-built houses occupied illegally by local residents of Delft in the Western Cape on 19 December 2007.

After the occupation, it emerged that Martin had encouraged local families to occupy the houses. He was arrested on 20 December on charges of issuing letters to an estimated 300 families in Delft which allegedly granted them permission to move into the houses and stated that he would accept full responsibility for the consequences. Charges against Martin were later dropped.

In February 2008, Judge Van Zyl of the Cape Town High Court ruled to evict residents. In his comments, he faulted Martin for instigating the occupation. On 18 February 2009, a City of Cape Town disciplinary committee found Martin guilty of encouraging people to invade homes at Delft. As punishment, Martin was suspended for only one month while former supporters of the councillor expressed outrage and called for him to be fired.

== See also ==
- N2 Gateway
- Symphony Way Informal Settlement
- N2 Gateway occupations
