= A History of the World in Seven Cheap Things =

2018 book by Raj Patel and Jason W. Moore

- First edition
- Author: Raj Patel and Jason W. Moore
- Language: English
- Publisher: University of California Press (US); Verso Books (UK); Black Inc (Aus)
- Publication date: 2018
- Pages: 336
- ISBN: 978-1-78873-213-0

A History of the World in Seven Cheap Things: A Guide to Capitalism, Nature, and the Future of the Planet is a book by Raj Patel and Jason W. Moore published in 2018.

== Premise ==
The book considers the development of Capitalism and the Anthropocene through the interrelationship of seven 'cheap things'. These are:

- Cheap Nature
- Cheap Money
- Cheap Work
- Cheap Care
- Cheap Food
- Cheap Energy
- Cheap Lives

The book suggests that these seven things must be cheap to sustain the capitalist system. Cheapness is then defined as 'a set of strategies to manage relations between capitalism and the web of life', meaning its value is established by social or cultural relationships that maintain the cost lower than what should actually be worth. Cheapness then is not just about low cost. It is rather a strategy capitalism has employed to transform undenominated objects and relationships into circuits of production and consumption that have the lowest possible dollar value. Thereafter, if the "actual" price of these things would be respected or at equilibrium, the system would not maintain itself if it would be too costly.

Both authors are considered neo marxist, at least in their method and critique to the exploration relations of capitalism.

The authors adopt a world ecology approach. This approach commits to understanding human relations of power, production, and environment-making in the web of life.

== Reception ==
The Guardian praised the book's 'impressive ability to synthesise disparate elements'.
