= Jacques Grinevald =

Jacques Grinevald (born 14 January 1946 in Strasbourg) is a French philosopher, and a historian of scientific and technological development, who helped pioneer the idea of degrowth. He is a professor emeritus of global ecology at the Graduate Institute of International and Development Studies in Geneva, Switzerland.

== Background and education ==
After studying political science at the Graduate Institute of International and Development Studies, Grinevald went on to obtain a doctoral degree in epistemology and the history of science from Paris Nanterre University.

Grinevald joined the faculty of the Graduate Institute of International and Development Studies in 1973. He has also taught at the École Polytechnique Fédérale de Lausanne and at the University of Geneva.

In 2015, he was awarded an Energy and Resources Institute Nicholas Georgescu-Roegen Award "for his important contributions to the Decroissance (Degrowth) literature."

== Work ==
Grinevald is best known for helping bring the idea of degrowth to prominence in 1970s France by translating into French (alongside Swiss law professor Ivo Rens (fr)) the works of its prominent theorist the ecological economist Nicholas Georgescu-Roegen.

Grinevald is a fellow of the Geological Society of London and a member of the Anthropocene Working Group, an interdisciplinary research group established by the International Commission on Stratigraphy dedicated to the study of the Anthropocene as a geological time unit.

== Publication ==
Representative publications include:

- La Biosphère de l'Anthropocène: pétrole et climate, la double menace: repères transdisciplinaires, 1824–2007. (Geneva, Georg) (2007) 292p.
- Demain la décroissance: Entropie - Écologie - Économie. By N. Georgescu-Roegen, ed. by J. Grinevald and I. Rens (Paris, P.-M. Favre Editions) (1979) 254p.
- "The Anthropocene: conceptual and historical perspectives," co-authored with Will Steffen, Paul J. Crutzen and J. R. McNeill, Philosophical Transactions of the Royal Society (2011).
- "Was the Anthropocene anticipated," co-authored with Clive Hamilton, The Anthropocene Review (2015).
