= Blikkiesdorp Project =

The Blikkiesdorp Project is officially titled People in Blikkies: An Insult to South Africa's Young Democracy, and refers to a social documentary effort featuring the Blikkiesdorp community in Delft, Cape Town. The project is in association with Uthango Social Investments and Eclipse PR. The settlement is officially recognized as Symphony Way Temporary Location Area. The project is led by South African photojournalist Lizane Louw, and was active between 2008 and May 2012. The subject of the photographs are the substandard living space and the socioeconomic challenges of the residents. Lizane's goal is to give the people of Blikkies a voice through the use of imagery and media presence attempt to spur change for this ineffective solution to Cape Town's eviction crisis. Since Lizane began her mission to capture the injustices of Blikkies, the settlement has grown almost 15 times larger, inflating from a population of 1600 to a count of 25000 in 2013, and now each structure houses between 5 and 15 people. The photos became the material of her first solo-exhibition which premiered in 2012. The photos are also a precursor to a documentary film that Lizane plans to shoot in 2014.

== Project History ==
The Blikkiesdorp project began when Lizane was covering the settlement for a local newspaper called the Kaap Rapport to report on the unsatisfactory conditions of the community. The article has now turned into the material of a lifelong project. Lizane was inspired to inaugurate her Blikkies effort as an official documentary project when two of the elderly ladies she had been working with died of starvation and tuberculosis due to the circumstances living in the community. She learned over time that despite the government initiation of the project, the issues plaguing the area such as rape, prostitution, and both human and drug trafficking went unnoticed without any NGO or public organization working directly with the community. Rather than photograph these negative stories, she decided to focus on the inspiring and beautiful unsung parts of Blikkiesdorp.

== About the photographer ==
Lizane Louw is a photojournalist, events photographer, and portrait photographer who has been active in the South African media industry since 2007. She served as a contract photojournalist for national publications of Media 24, Rapport, Kaap Rapport and Die Burger until December 2010. She published successfully in Huisgenoot, You, Beeld, The Argus, Cape Times, Mango Magazine, NRC, Nederland's Handelsblad, L'officiel NL, and Africa is a Country and various other local and international publications, print as well as online. As a freelance photojournalist, when in South Africa, she also contributes images to the Gallo Image Library and Africamediaonline. In 2008 she was nominated, with fellow journalist, Colin Hendricks, for Vodacom Journalist of the Year 2008, Category: Hard News, for a feature and investigative story, 'The Suitcase Murder' for Kaap Rapport. In 2011 she was published by the Royal School of Fine Art, Stockholm, Architecture Department and later that same year a selection of photographs from her archive was chosen by Utango, a Non Profit Company, for a WEF (World Economic Forum) event. The photos were used in a presentation to create awareness for Impact Investing in Africa. In September 2011, Louw was an official photographer of Archbishop Desmond Tutu's book launch, Tutu, the Authorized Portrait.

== Visual Representation Details ==
The photos are intended to raise awareness about sanitation standards and living conditions which ignite comparisons to a concentration camp and cause symptoms of depression in the residents. Lizane's technique of documenting Blikkies involves a political strategy that shares the information through social media and exhibition channels such as Facebook and Twitter. She stresses telling the subject's stories without exploiting or abusing their sensitive experiences in conjunction with a political agenda. The photos focus on a sense of vulnerability, issues mainly of poverty, unemployment and crime. Lizane's shooting techniques include urban landscape photography, capturing everything as it was found, nothing fabricated for the purpose of photo aesthetic. The demographics of the subjects are unique for the cultural setting of the project, as the struggling residents of Blikkies are white, black, and coloured. Examples of the subjects she tries to capture are individuals who are completely dependent on donations for survival, as well as those who are challenged by the extreme weather due to feeble housing structures. She was also confronted with a spread of other issues plaguing the area, such as rape, prostitution, and both human and drug trafficking without any NGO working directly with the community.

Louw gives a first-hand account of the Blikkiesdorp atmosphere:

"Blikkiesdorp has a moon landscape, there is no colour, no solid structures, no plants, grass or trees. When I first started photographing there it looked to me like a metal tin-town. I understood the name it was given by the community ' Tin Town' or in Afrikaans " Blikkiesdorp". The "architecture" is changing as more people are moved in and more structures are built. And yes, it is becoming another shanty town."

Rather than photographing only the negative aspects of these stories, she decided to combine on the inspiring and beautiful unsung parts of the wasteland by including images of motivated and heroic people as well as the family-like bond between the residents as a counterbalance. In order to locate her subjects, Louw collaborated heavily with community leader Bernadine de Kock, who is also running her own project in the Blikkies community working with food distribution. Bernadine would lead Lizane to willing individuals who were experiencing harsh circumstances that reflected standard challenges of the area. All the images can be found on the project's Facebook page and are shot with a Nikon D7000.

== Resident accounts ==
The story that originally prompted Louw to create the Blikkiesdorp Project was the story of Ouma Magdalena. At 91 years old, she was the oldest resident in Blikkiesdorp. Ouma died in 2010 due to starvation, and she with her name on the public housing list as it had been for 17 years. Ouma died during the 2010 FIFA World Cup held in Cape Town, as millions of dollars were spent on funding for the event rather than communities like Ouma's.

Adeen and Anton were a couple living in Blikkies together. Anton applied for and received his first disability grant at the end of May and left Adeen in Blikkies. Due to this, their "engagement" is off and also the wedding Adeen's mom, Tannie Elna, was dreaming about.

Eileen Plaatjies was diagnosed with cancer last year. The doctors that was treating her, gave up hope and said there is nothing more to be done to help her in her fight against the disease. According to her caregivers, neighbors and woman from the Blikkiesdorp community, she was given two bottles of Liquid Morphine to drink and was sent home from hospital.

== Blikkiesdorp Project Press ==
Articles about the Blikkiesdorp Project have been written by the Kaap Rapport, the Paperli blog, the Africa is a Country blog. A team of Journalists from TV Folha, Brazil, in 2011, who interviewed Louw about her work for the project to investigate South Africa and the Soccer World Cup of 2010 for a YouTube feature titled "Após dois anos, África do Sul ainda paga conta de estádios". The World Cup contributed to a spike in the population at Blikkies, as the city attempted to clean up the streets of its homeless vagrants or "Bergies", and planted them in Blikkies.

The press has positively impacted the morale of the community, as Louw reports that "The pastors, priests and leaders of the community posted the page on walls and in the community halls".
