= Residents of Joe Slovo Community v Thubelisha Homes =

South African legal case

Residents of Joe Slovo Community, Western Cape v Thubelisha Homes and Others (Centre on Housing Rights and Evictions and Another, Amici Curiae) is an important case in South African property law, heard by the Constitutional Court on August 21, 2008, with judgment handed down on June 10.

== Facts ==
Joe Slovo informal settlement, situated alongside the N2 highway in Cape Town, on land owned by the City of Cape Town, was first occupied in the 1990s. It was rife with fire hazards, and its conditions were unsanitary. Although initially it had no running water, and no toilets or roads or electricity, the municipality began over time to provide some basic services, including water, container toilets and rudimentary cleaning. After a devastating fire in 2000, and after some "pressure, negotiations or demands," the City had, in terms of its constitutional and legislative obligations, made further provision for "substantial services of a permanent nature," including tap water, toilets, refuse removal, the lay-out of streets, drainage, connection to the electricity grid and house numbers. These basic municipal services were carried out in "an ongoing, long-term fashion." The residents had lived there for a long time, some for as long as fifteen years. Apparently the question was never raised, during the fifteen years of the settlement's existence, of their right to occupy; there was certainly no evidence of the City's ever having tried to remove them.

Under the state's Breaking New Ground (BNG) policy, aimed at the elimination of informal settlements in South Africa, Joe Slovo was targeted for upgrade and redevelopment, "no doubt because of the deplorable and inhuman conditions under which the people live." The Gateway Housing Project (as it was called) required that the residents be moved. During 2006 and 2007 "considerable effort" was undertaken to persuade them to relocate to Delft, that Thubelisha Homes might proceed with the development of the second phase of the project. This effort failed because, having been promised rents of between R150 and R300 per month, the price actually turned out, according to the occupants, to range from R600 to R1,050. At some point during their subsequent occupation, each of the residents was a dealt a "red card" by the City, indicating that the holder had applied for housing with the municipality.

The respondents brought a High-Court application seeking the residents' eviction in terms of the Prevention of Illegal Eviction from and Unlawful Occupation of Land Act (PIE), on the grounds that the property was required for the development. The residents, for their part, argued that they were not unlawful occupiers: They had obtained the necessary consent of the City of Cape Town to occupy the land, and hence were not "unlawful occupiers" as defined in the Act. They should not, therefore, be evicted. The appellants also depended on the provision of the red cards—these, they argued, entitled them to remain in undisturbed possession of their houses—and on the fact that reconstruction work had been done by the City after the fire, as well as on the supply of basic services, which ostensibly indicated the City's consent.

Nomaindia Mfeketo, the previous mayor of Cape Town, denied in her testimony that consent had been given to occupy. She argued that the services had been provided for "basic humanitarian reasons." They must not be construed as consent on the part of the City; nor, Mfeketo contended, did they grant the residents any enforceable right to remain in the area. It had always been intended that informal settlements in general would be upgraded or moved or redeveloped, in conformity with the state's constitutional imperative to provide access to adequate housing on a progressive basis.

== Issues ==
The High Court ultimately granted the eviction order, and the residents applied for leave to appeal directly to the Constitutional Court, where, when it was granted, they raised the following issues:

1. whether or not the applicants were unlawful occupiers in terms of PIE and, if not, whether their occupation was lawfully terminated;
2. whether section 5 or 6 of the Act was applicable;
3. whether the technical requirements of PIE had been complied with;
4. whether the relocation of the applicants was just and equitable;
5. whether the applicants had a substantive and legitimate expectation in relation to the allocation of housing opportunities in the Joe Slovo settlement to them, and whether this expectation had been or could be fulfilled;
6. whether the eviction was in all the circumstances reasonable; and
7. the nature of the appropriate and just and equitable relief.

Two key legal decisions arose for decision. The first was whether or not the respondents had made out a case for eviction in terms of PIE. Key to this question was whether or not, at the time of the launch of eviction proceedings, the applicants were "unlawful occupiers" within the meaning of the Act, and whether or not it was just and equitable to issue an eviction order.

PIE defines an unlawful occupier as

a person who occupies land without the express or tacit consent of the owner or person in charge, or without any other right in law to occupy such land, excluding a person who is an occupier in terms of the Extension of Security of Tenure Act, 1997, and excluding a person whose informal right to land, but for the provisions of this Act, would be protected by the provisions of the Interim Protection of Informal Land Rights Act, 1996.

The question hinged, therefore, on whether or not the municipality had consented to the occupation. If there had been consent, and the right to occupy had not been terminated, the respondents would not have been entitled to a relocation order. Once there is a right to eject, however,—and this is so only if there is no municipal consent to occupy—the provisions of PIE become applicable as a matter of protection to the person or persons liable to eviction.

The second question was whether the respondents had acted reasonably, within the meaning of the Constitution, in seeking the applicants' eviction.

== Judgment ==
The Constitutional Court held that the provision of basic services was legitimate evidence of the City's state of mind. Clearly it was appreciated that the residents were a reality and would have to be accepted and provided for in a humane manner for a considerable period of time, until access to adequate housing could be realised. The provision of basic services, taken together with several other factors, had to lead to the irresistible inference that the City had tacitly given its permission for the occupation.

The court found, however, that the invocation of PIE procedures on the public breakdown of the process between the residents and the State served in itself as a final statement that the occupation of the Joe Slovo settlement had been rendered unlawful. Provided that the order for the eviction and relocation made appropriate provision for the safe and dignified and humane relocation of everyone involved, the eviction and relocation would be in accordance with justice and equity, as required by PIE. The order should therefore be coupled with a further order guaranteeing that the applicants should be allocated the specified proportion of the new houses to be built on the site of Joe Slovo within a process of meaningful engagement with the people. The appeal was thus allowed in part, but the eviction was permitted to go ahead.

== Statutes ==
- Extension of Security of Tenure Act 62 of 1997.
- Interim Protection of Informal Land Rights Act 31 of 1996.
- Prevention of Illegal Eviction from and Unlawful Occupation of Land Act 19 of 1998.
