= Raj Patel =

British academic (born 1972)

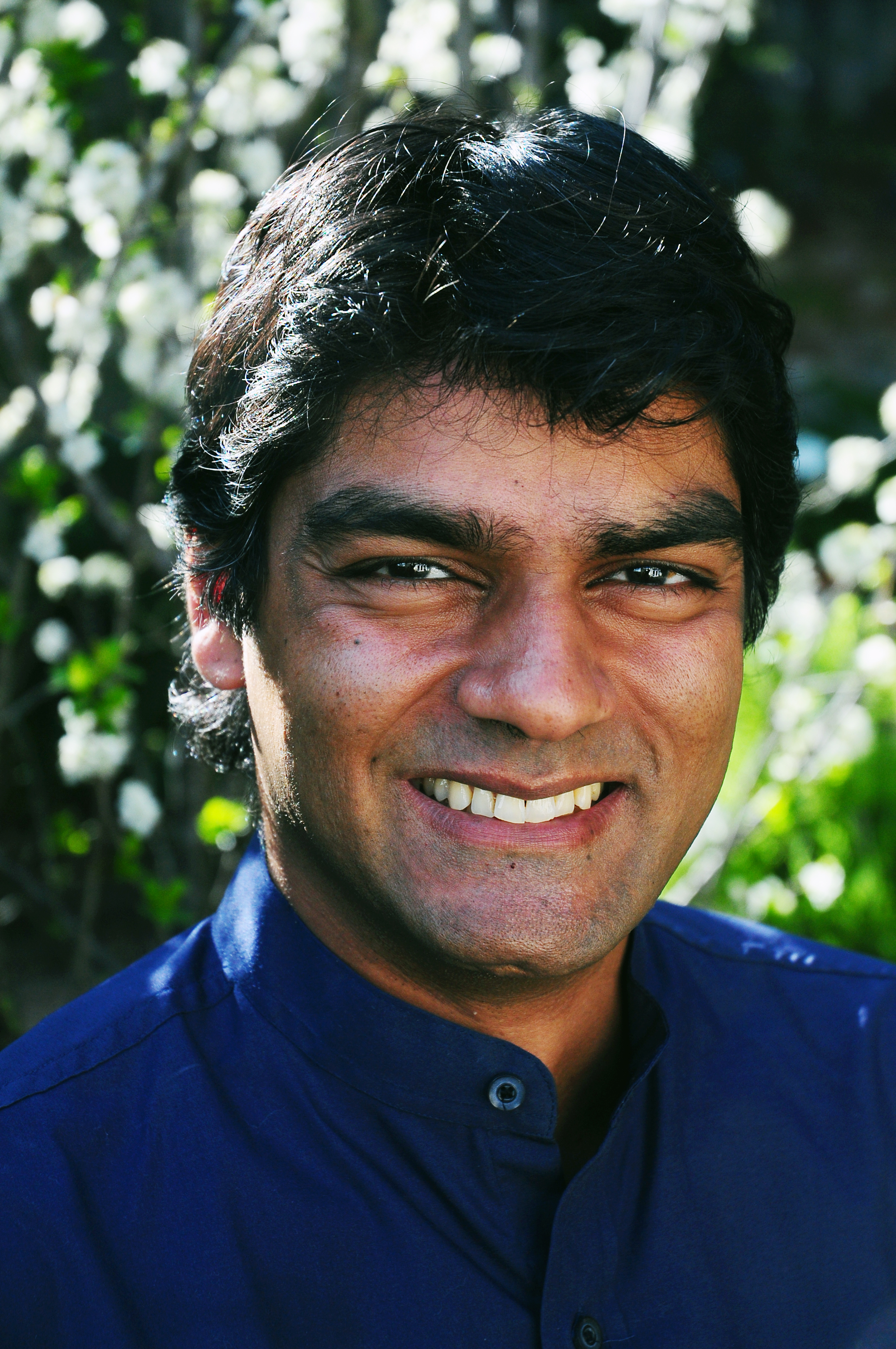
- Born: 1972 (age 53–54); London, England
- Education: University of Oxford; London School of Economics; Cornell University
- Occupations: Economist, writer, filmmaker
- Writing career
- Notable works: The Value of Nothing; Stuffed and Starved; (with Jason Moore); A History of the World in Seven Cheap Things: A Guide to Capitalism, Nature, and the Future of the Planet
- Website: rajpatel.org

Rajeev "Raj" Patel (born 1972) is a British academic, journalist, activist, writer and documentary filmmaker who has lived and worked in Zimbabwe, South Africa, and the United States for extended periods. He has been referred to as "the rock star of social justice writing."

== Early life and education ==
Born to a mother from Kenya and a father from Fiji, he grew up in Golders Green in north-west London where his family ran a corner shop.

Patel received a BA in Philosophy, Politics and Economics (PPE), from Oxford, and a master's degree from the London School of Economics, and gained his PhD in Development Sociology from Cornell University in 2002.

As part of his academic training, Patel worked at the World Bank, World Trade Organization, and the United Nations. He has since become an outspoken public critic of all of these organisations, and reports having been tear-gassed on four continents protesting against his former employers.

== Career ==
Patel is an educator and academic. He has written articles and books. He is possibly best known for his 2008 book, Stuffed and Starved: The Hidden Battle for the World Food System. In 2009, he published The Value of Nothing which was on The New York Times best-seller list during February 2010. In 2017, he published, with co-author Jason W. Moore, A History of the World in Seven Cheap Things: A Guide to Capitalism, Nature, and the Future of the Planet (University of California Press).

He has been a visiting scholar at Yale University, the University of California, Berkeley, and the University of Texas at Austin. Patel is listed as a research professor at the LBJ School of Public Affairs of the University of Texas at Austin.

== Activism ==
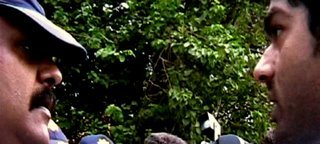
Raj Patel (r) confronts Glen Nayager of the South African Police at an Abahlali baseMjondolo protest in Durban.

Patel was one of many organizers in the 1999 protests in Seattle, Washington, and has organised in support of food sovereignty. More recently he has resided and worked extensively in Zimbabwe and in South Africa. He was refused a visa extension by the Mugabe regime for his political involvement with the pro-democracy movement. He is associated through his work on food with the Via Campesina movement, and through his work on urban poverty and resistance with Abahlali baseMjondolo and the now defunct Landless Peoples Movement in South Africa.

Patel has written a number of criticisms of various aspects of the policies and research methods of the World Bank and was a co-editor, with Christopher Brooke, of the online leftist webzine The Voice of the Turtle.

== Film ==
In 2012, he appeared in the National Film Board of Canada documentary Payback, based on Margaret Atwood's Payback: Debt and the Shadow Side of Wealth, which premiered at the 2012 Sundance Film Festival. He appears in the documentary film A Place at the Table which opened in the US on 1 March 2013.

=== The Ants and the Grasshopper ===
Patel co-directed the documentary The Ants and the Grasshopper (2021) with Zak Piper. The film follows Malawian farmer and community organiser Anita Chitaya as she travels from Bwabwa to the United States to persuade farmers, climate sceptics and legislators that climate change is real. Anita is a community promoter with Soils, Food and Healthy Communities (SFHC), a farmer-led agroecology organisation based in Ekwendeni, northern Malawi. Filming began in 2012 on Patel's first visit to Malawi and took about ten years to complete. The film premiered at Mountainfilm in Telluride in May 2021, where Patel received the Moving Mountains Award, and screened at Sheffield DocFest the following month.

== Honours and awards ==
In 2007 he was invited to give the keynote address at the university of Abahlali baseMjondolo graduation ceremony. He administers the organisation's website. In 2008 he was asked to testify on the global food crisis before the House Financial Services Committee in the USA. In 2009 he joined the advisory board of Corporate Accountability International's Value the Meal campaign.

== Claim that Patel is the 'Maitreya' ==
In January 2010 some adherents of Share International, following an announcement by Benjamin Creme, concluded that Patel could be the Maitreya, a notion that Patel denied.

== Political views ==
Patel is a libertarian socialist and has described himself as "someone who has very strong anarchist sympathies." In his book The Value of Nothing he praised the grassroots participatory democracy practised in the Zapatista Councils of Good Government in southern Mexico and has advocated similar decentralist models of economic democracy and confederal administration as templates to go by for social justice movements in the global north. He described himself in 2010 as "not a communist [or socialist] ... just open minded".

Nonetheless, the analysis of A History of the World in Seven Cheap Things: A Guide to Capitalism, Nature, and the Future of the Planet, published seven years later, locates its concept of "cheapness" within a Marxist framework. According to the authors, "Capitalism values only what it can count, and it can count only dollars. Every capitalist wants to invest as little and profit as much as possible. For capitalism, this means that the whole system thrives when powerful states and capitalists can reorganize global nature, invest as little as they can, and receive as much food, work, energy, and raw materials with as little disruption as possible." This extrapolates a key formulation by Marx: “The battle of competition is fought by the cheapening of commodities.”

== Personal life ==
Patel became a US citizen on 7 January 2010.

In an interview with The New Yorker's Lauren Collins, he said he considers himself an atheist Hindu.

== Books ==
- Stuffed and Starved: The Hidden Battle for the World Food System (2008)
- Food Rebellions! Crisis and the Hunger for Justice, Eric Holt Giménez, Raj Patel (2009)
- Food Rebellions!: Forging Food Sovereignty to Solve the Global Food Crisis (2009)
- The Value of Nothing: How to Reshape Market Society and Redefine Democracy (2010)
- Forward to No Land! No House! No Vote! Voices from Symphony Way by the Symphony Way Pavement Dwellers (2011)
- A History of the World in Seven Cheap Things: A Guide to Capitalism, Nature, and the Future of the Planet (2017), with Jason W. Moore
- Inflamed: Deep Medicine and the Anatomy of Injustice (2021), with Rupa Marya

== See also ==
- Landless Workers' Movement
- Slow Food
- Via Campesina
- Zapatista Army of National Liberation
- Anita Chitaya
