= No Land! No House! No Vote! (book) =

Book by Symphony Way Pavement Dwellers

No Land! No House! No Vote! Voices from Symphony Way
- Author: Symphony Way Pavement Dwellers
- Language: English, Afrikaans
- Subject: Land Rights, Civil Rights. Citizenship
- Genre: Non-fiction
- Published: 1 March 2011 Pambazuka Press (first edition)
- Publication place: South Africa
- Media type: Paperback
- Pages: 160
- ISBN: 9781906387846 (pbk.); 9780857490308 (ebook - PDF)

No Land! No House! No Vote! Voices from Symphony Way is an anthology published in 2011 of 45 factual tales written and edited by the Symphony Way Pavement Dwellers.

The foreword to the book is written by activist and author Raj Patel and the introduction is penned by Miloon Kothari, former United Nations Special Rapporteur on Adequate Housing.

== Summary ==
The book follows hundreds of shackdwellers in the township of Delft in Cape Town. The stories are real-life accounts of the struggle of the Symphony Way Pavement Dwellers. In early 2007, they were moved into houses they had been waiting for since the end of Apartheid but soon were told that the move had been illegal and they were removed from their new homes. In protest, they occupied Symphony Way, a main road opposite the housing project. It soon blossomed into a settlement of hundreds of shacks inhabited by organised protesting families. It became known as Symphony Way and was the home ground of the Symphony Way Anti-Eviction Campaign, whose membership vowed to stay on the road until the government gave them permanent housing.

The community was eventually evicted after almost two years occupying Symphony Way. They were moved to the Blikkiesdorp temporary relocation area where they are still struggling for land and housing.

In his forward, Raj Patel says that the book is "both testimony and poetry" and contributor Conway Payn "opens the door to a world of compassion, of fellow-suffering, that holds you firm." The introduction is contributed by Miloon Kothari, who was United Nations Special Rapporteur on adequate housing between 2000 and 2008.

== Themes ==
The overall theme in the book is the shackdwellers' struggle for land, housing and dignity as human beings. However, the stories also cover many general issues within poor communities including relationships and physical abuse. The authors' concerns range from safety on "their" road to the impending eviction because of the 2010 FIFA World Cup.

Another recurring theme throughout the anthology is how the struggle enabled the pavement dwellers to build a strong community on the road.

== Reception ==
Journalist and author Naomi Klein said that the book is "A beauty, extraordinary in every way." Critical geographer Michael Watts, called the book "a clarion call for basic human rights and for human dignity".

Historian and anti-apartheid activist, Martin Legassick, says in his review of the book for Amandla! Magazine: "I wish I could bury the noses of Tokyo Sexwale and Bonginkosi Madikazela in its pages. Everyone should buy this book and read it". In his review in Red Pepper Magazine he says that the book is "a remarkable and moving volume, charged with emotion and satiated with reasonableness".

== Reviews ==
- Street people book their place on library shelf by Jeanne Hromnik, published in the Cape Argus, 25 May 2011
- Review of No Land! No House! No Vote! for Amandla! Magazine by Martin Legassick, 1 June 2011
- Book review: No Land! No House! No Vote! Voices from Symphony Way, by Michael Neocosmos, Journal of Asian and African Studies, October 2012 47: 580–582

== See also ==
- Abahlali baseMjondolo
