= Capitalocene =

Term in climate politics

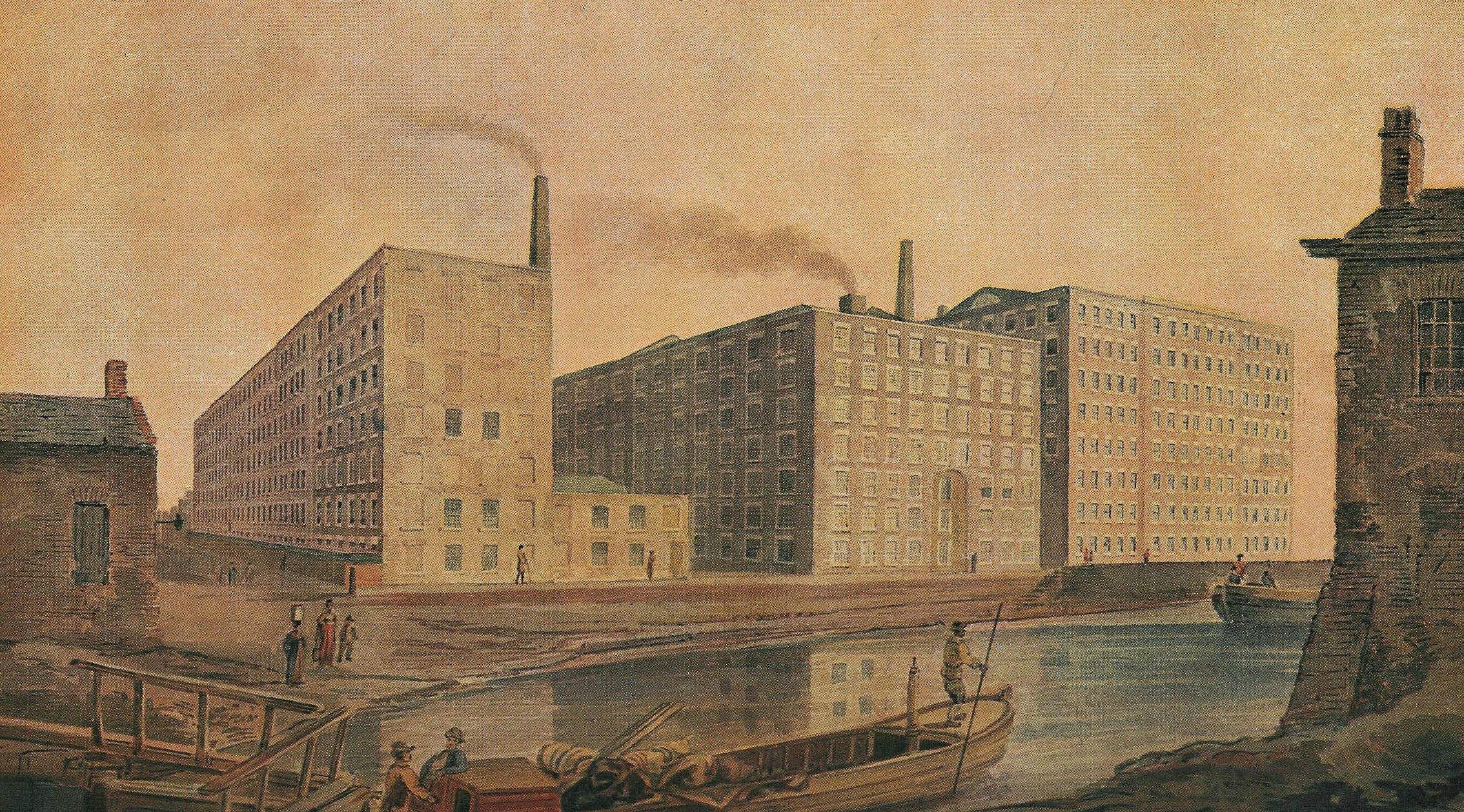
McConnel & Company mills, Manchester c. 1820. Fossil fuels were first used as a generalized power source in the British textile industry.

The Capitalocene is a critique of "man versus nature" thinking in climate politics. Frequently misunderstood as an alternative geological periodization to the Anthropocene proposal, the Capitalocene's leading proponents argue for the centrality of capitalism in the making of climate crisis. The Capitalocene is a way to understand capitalism as a geohistorical process, not a geological event as conventionally understood.

For Andreas Malm, this is the theory of fossil capital. For Jason W. Moore, it is the theory of Cheap Nature in the capitalist world-ecology. Both argue, with Karl Marx, that capitalism is a labor process, and a class struggle, in the web of life. While Malm sees the origins of climate crisis with the ascendancy of fossil capital after 1830, Moore locates the dawn of "capitalogenic" crisis in the long seventeenth century (c. 1550-1700). Both agree with Marx that capitalism is defined by the imperative of endless capital accumulation, which implies increasingly serious metabolic antagonisms.

== Definition and utility ==
The Capitalocene, in its simplest terms, is a species of geopoetry, literally "earth poetry." It is a critique of the Anthropocene as a geohistorical concept and its deeper, animating philosophy of "humanity" and "nature." In contrast, historical materialists emphasize the labor process and the class struggle. Class and labor are, for the Capitalocene thesis, metabolic relations through which capitalism shapes environments, and is shaped by webs of life.

According to proponents, this critique of Man versus Nature thinking allows the Capitalocene thesis to move beyond theory, and reconstruct a history of the origins of planetary crisis rooted in imperialism, class struggle, and world accumulation, all with and within webs of life. In this approach, class and capital are not only driving forces of planetary crisis, but "guiding threads" for the investigation of power, profit and life in the modern world—and for the elaboration of a socialist climate politics in the twenty-first century.

While these thinkers appreciate the Anthropocene perspective's role in advancing environmental debate in the public sphere, they believe that it ultimately serves to reify and mystify the real causes of environmental crisis, and even impede the action needed to mitigate it, since doing so would be a vain attempt to countermand the trends of nature. The Capitalocene moves the root of the problem into capitalist social relations, which are changeable and challengeable by the popular forces. Since the Capitalocene notion's debut, it has been applied by scholars in the fields of architecture, literary analysis, digital studies, and pedagogy.

== Genealogy ==
The “Capitalocene” framework originated in the early twenty-first century from a dialogue between proponents of the “Anthropocene” and thinkers from the eco-Marxist and ecofeminist traditions. The Anthropocene concept was first proposed by atmospheric chemist Paul J. Crutzen in 2002, who described it as a new, post-Holocene era in which in the global atmosphere is undergoing major, long-term transformation on account of human activity, particularly global warming. Crutzen suggested that this era began in the late eighteenth century with James Watt's design of the steam engine. Since the publication of Crutzen's essay, the Anthropocene has come to be widely discussed in academic and popular settings.

Ecological Marxism traces its roots to the writings of Karl Marx and Friedrich Engels. Although anthropogenic global warming was not known to the two men, both were interested in the unintended natural consequences of human activity. The topic was an occasional theme in their later writing, as seen most notably in Marx's exploration of “social metabolism” and Engels' passage on the “revenge of nature.”

Although this facet of their work was long neglected, the rise of the environmental movement in the late twentieth century provoked a new interest in these passages and in environmental questions more generally among Marxist scholars of that time, exemplified by James O'Connor's theory of the “second contradiction of capitalism” and John Bellamy Foster's exegesis of Marx's “metabolic rift.” As Crutzen's framework spread among natural scientists and filtered down to the wider public, it attracted the attention of social scientists from this and the related ecofeminist school.

The term “Capitalocene” was first coined in 2009 by the Swedish human ecologist Andreas Malm, then a doctoral student at the University of Lund. Through private correspondence it spread to other scholars such as feminist Donna Haraway and geographer Jason W. Moore.

== Detailed overview ==
Since the first invocation of the concept, at least two distinct formulations thereof emerged concurrently in the early-to-mid 2010s. The first is that of Malm himself, joined by Alf Hornborg, (Note: Another human ecologist at Lund, and Malm's doctoral advisor) Kohei Saito, and others broadly associated with the metabolic rift school. The other was developed by Moore, and endorsed by Haraway. The disagreement between these two camps is derived from differences over the periodization of capitalist origins and the decisive unit of analysis: England versus the Atlantic world.

Malm hews closely to the “Political Marxism” of Robert Brenner. Moore is often mischaracterized as an adherent of world-systems analysis. Moore and Wallerstein agree on the periodization of capitalism. Moore has emphasized his distance from world-systems analysis while agreeing with Wallerstein on the centrality of imperialist "political accumulation" in world class formation and class struggle.

For Malm, the Capitalocene is the era governed by “fossil capitalism,” a mode of production characterized by “self-sustaining growth predicated on the growing consumption of fossil fuels and therefore generating a sustained growth in CO_{2} emissions.” Malm follows Crutzen in narrowly identifying CO_{2}-driven warming as the defining attribute of our era, on account of its major consequences for every part of the biosphere. Though he does not deny the importance of other forms of environmental disruption, he considers climate change worthy of special attention and an adequate yardstick for all the others.

Malm departs from Crutzen, in his periodization. The Capitalocene begins not with the invention of Watt's steam engine, but with its ascendancy as the main source of power for the British cotton industry in the second quarter of the nineteenth century. To him, the mere invention of the engine (let alone that of fire, as argued by some Anthropocene proponents) is not sufficient, nor is the widespread use of coal for heating purposes in Elizabethan England. It was only when fossil fuels became a means of “self-sustaining growth” by way of provisioning generally applicable industrial power that massive and growing carbon emissions became an economic imperative.

The adoption of fossil power, by Malm's account, was not due to inherent drives of the “human enterprise” such as population growth, “limited productive powers of the land,” or the self-evident superiority of steam technology. (Note: Causes proposed by, respectively: Malthusianism, Ricardianism, and Marxian productive force determinism. The quoted phrase is Ricardo's own, used in On the Principles of Political Economy and Taxation) Fossil Capital argues that steam power's real advantage at the time and place of its adoption was the degree of control over production it gave to British textile mill owners. Adoption of new technology is typically assumed to be driven by its potential to reduce wage expenses; in the case of weaving, mechanization was actually caused by the extremely low cost of labor power.

Following the Panic of 1825, weavers' wages plummeted to bare subsistence level. This compelled weavers—who generally worked from home, without continual supervision—to make a living by embezzling their product and selling it on the side, incurring losses to their employers. Yet even in this case, writes Malm, it is not obvious that steam-powered mechanization should have prevailed over more established water power. Beginning in 1824, Scottish engineer Robert Thom developed a highly advanced industrial water supply system, first implemented in the town of Greenock, Scotland, which could power mills at one-eighth the expense of steam power.

This attracted wide interest from British manufacturers, and ambitious plans were made to construct similar infrastructure on the River Irwell and near Saddleworth, before being abandoned. While the exact reason for the cancellation of these projects is uncertain due to the loss of relevant documents, Malm argues that it was fundamentally a collective action problem: manufacturers were not willing to make a necessary large, pooled investment that might benefit their competitors more than them, (Note: Some millers, for example, were further downstream from the reservoir than others, and would therefore have to start and end production later in the day than their upstream competitors.) and which would be controlled by a joint association rather than within the confines of their own mill.

In sum, Malm's thesis is that the rise of fossil fuels was not a collective decision of mankind nor the inevitable result of its nature, but the outcome of specific dynamics of capitalist production. “Capitalocene,” in his opinion, therefore has the advantage of being more accurate and precise than “Anthropocene.”

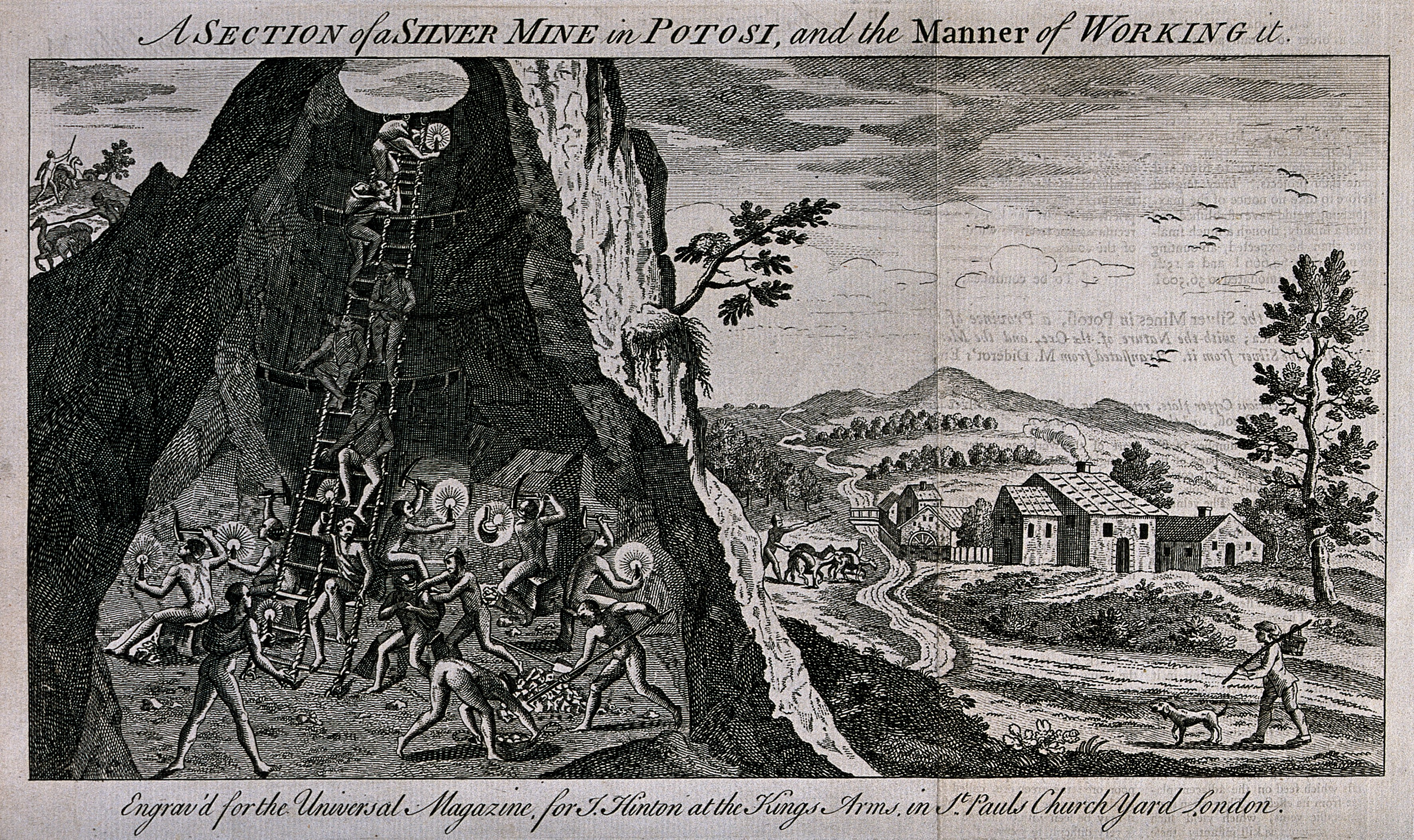
The Potosí silver mine in Bolivia, c. 1750—cited by Moore as an early example of "Cheap Nature" appropriation

Jason W. Moore, on the other hand, argues that while climate change is surely the most prominent attribute of the Capitalocene, it is only part of a larger complex of crises in the “web of life.” The root of all these, in his view, is capitalism's drive to appropriate “Cheap Nature” in the form of food, labor, energy, and raw materials. This process is just as foundational to capitalism as those of primitive accumulation, commodification, or proletarianization described in Marx's Capital.

Capitalism as a system founded on the value form, claims Moore, can function only because these “Four Cheaps” are kept “off the books” of value exchange and acquired at little or no expense. Such appropriation is itself only possible because of an ideological development of the early modern era that posited a newly absolute conceptual division between society and nature, which Moore equates with Cartesian dualism.

Operating from these premises, Moore dates the onset of the Capitalocene to “a radical shift in the scale, speed and scope of landscape change [that] occurred in the long sixteenth century,” corresponding to the emergence of the capitalist world-system—in Moore's jargon, the capitalist world-ecology. While acknowledging that humans have transformed their environments since prehistory, he posits an enormous acceleration of such practices beginning around 1450, intertwined with the spread of European trade and colonialism through the world.

Among the developments of this period were the sudden and rapid deforestation of the Baltic region, Dutch land reclamation, the explosion of mining in Central Europe and the Andes, and the enslavement of human beings relegated to the category of “nature” rather than “society.” It is a mistake, says Moore, to consider the rise of steam industry or the increasing levels of carbon in the geologic record in the 19th century as the beginning of the Capitalocene, because these were merely the delayed effects of a system which emerged centuries earlier.

Donna Haraway, another popularizer of the concept, largely concurs with Moore's formulation and periodization. Drawing from Anna Tsing, however, she proposes that “the Anthropocene (Note: Haraway in this passage uses “Anthropocene” and “Capitalocene” interchangeably.) is more a boundary event than an epoch, like the K-Pg boundary between the Cretaceous and the Paleogene.” In contrast to historical investigation, she considers it necessary to imagine what sort of epoch—the "Chthulucene"—could be constructed on the other side of this boundary. Although Haraway considers the Capitalocene the most appropriate term for our era, she distances herself from any version of it “told in the idiom of fundamentalist Marxism, with all its trappings of Modernity, Progress, and History”; in short, from its articulation as an overly grand narrative.

Though the two versions of the Capitalocene idea outlined here share the same basic critique of the Anthropocene, they are marked by substantial theoretical differences. Malm and Kohei Saito, responding to Moore and Haraway, have each defended an analytical—if not ontological—distinction between society and nature, in relation to the metabolic rift theory. According to Malm, Moore's insistence on the identity of the two leads him to overlook important binary antagonisms that underlie society, and to underestimate capitalism's capacity to survive climate crisis even as millions of human beings do not survive it. He further accuses Moore and Haraway of obscurantist prose “that seeks to ruin as much analytical equipment as possible while charging with lowered lances.” Saito, in turn, charges Moore with cherrypicking Marx's œuvre to support his own positions. Moore, on his part, considers much of Malm's study of fossil capital to be compatible with and useful to his own theory, but overly limited in its focus on an ideal type of capitalism.

== Criticism and revision ==
Dipesh Chakrabarty has dismissed the debate over Capitalocene and Anthropocene terminology as “silly.” Peter Sutoris, writing in The Conversation, concedes that the Anthropocene is not a perfect framing, but defends it for the sense of urgency and dire consequences that it conveys.

A common objection to the Capitalocene is to highlight environmental damage on the part of socialism, or regimes which defined themselves as such. Philosopher Serge Audier, in his 2019 book L'âge productiviste, writes: "If we are to speak of the “Capitalocene,” then perhaps we are also obliged to speak of a kind of 'Socialocene,' or, all the more appropriately, of a 'Communistocene.' Curiously, none have been willing to take that step. However vexing it may be to acknowledge the major role in the ecological crisis played not just by Communist regimes, but by the broader socialist left on account of its majoritarian tendencies, this historic responsibility must be fully reckoned with." (Note: French: Si l’on décidait de parler de « capitalocène », peut-être faudrait-il alors se résoudre à parler également, en un certain sens, de « socialocène » et surtout de « communistocène », ce que curieusement personne ne se risque à faire. Aussi pénible que soit la reconnaissance du rôle majeur joué dans la crise écologique non seulement par les régimes communistes, mais aussi, beaucoup plus largement, par le socialisme et la gauche dans leur axe majoritaire, cette responsabilité historique doit être pleinement assumée.)

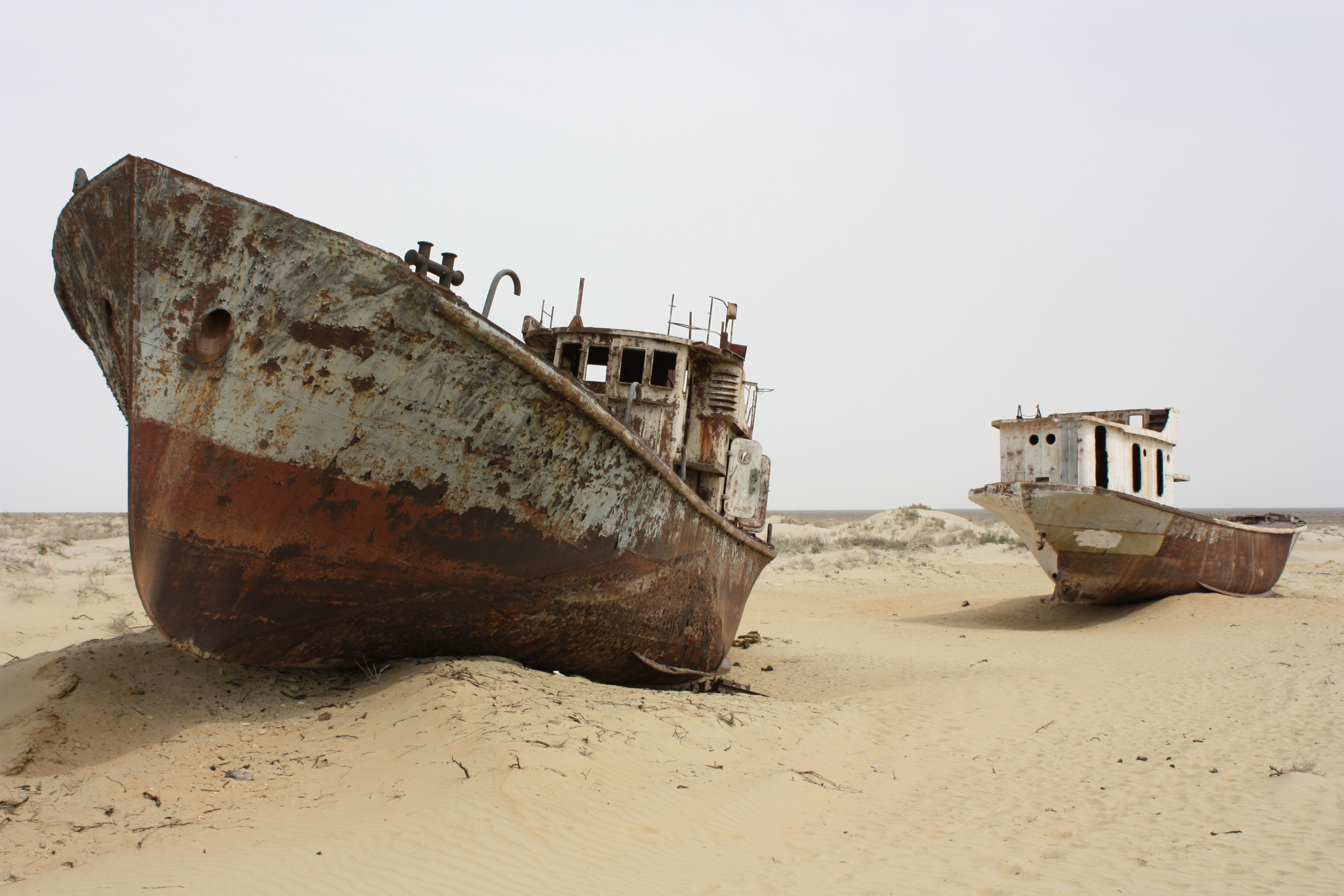
Rusted boats on what was once the bed of the Aral Sea. The sea's disappearance was the result of decisions made by Soviet planners.

To this objection, Malm concedes the poor environmental record of socialist states, but argues that the collapse of almost all such regimes has made this a far less pressing concern. “We do not live in the Vorkuta coal-mining gulag of the 1930s,” he writes. “It is no more. But the world that Lancashire founded in the 1830s encompasses us all as the ecological reality we have to deal with.”

Moore's response is to consider Eastern Bloc states semi-peripheral territories of the capitalist world-system, and thus a part of the Capitalocene in their own way. Since the publication of Audier's book, sociologist Zsuza Gille has published a study on the “Socialocene,” from a similar world-systems approach. This study devotes particular attention to how industrial waste and waste-producing processes were outsourced from the imperial core to the socialist bloc.

In L'Emballement du monde, a social history of energy exploitation, IFP School professor Victor Court evaluates and ultimately rejects the Capitalocene. (Note: More specifically, he evaluates Malm and Hornborg's version.) Like Moore, he objects to Malm's situation on fossil industry as eliding the importance of earlier merchant capitalism. Beyond this, he too raises the objection of twentieth century socialism's environmental record, and is not persuaded by Malm's aforementioned rejoinder: to concede that other economic systems contributed to climate change is to undermine the whole Capitalocene premise. Fundamentally, Court believes that while capitalist dynamics undeniably cause environmental damage, they are only one exemplar of the true problem, namely “protean and omnipresent relations of domination between individuals.” (Note: French: l’existence protéiforme et omniprésente de relations de domination entre les individus) Ending capitalism, therefore, is a necessary but not sufficient step toward environmental equilibrium; even a hypothetical socialist society of the future would still have to specifically tackle the problem of resource use.

== See also ==
- Degrowth – Philosophy calling for reduced consumption and production to achieve sustainability
- Ecosocialism – Ideology merging socialism with green politics
- Ecological Economics – Interdependence of human economies and natural ecosystems
- Environmental History – Specialisation of history
- Quaternary Period – Third and current period of the Cenozoic Era, from 2.58 million years ago to the present
- World-ecology—a Marxist conversation about capitalism in the web of life
- Post-capitalism – State whose economic system is no longer a form of capitalism
- Throw-away society – Human society strongly influenced by consumerism
