= N2 Gateway =

Housing project along the N2 freeway in Cape Town, South Africa

Coordinates: 33.949°S 18.525°E

The N2 Gateway Housing Pilot Project was a large housing programme along the N2 freeway between Cape Town International Airport and the city centre in Cape Town, South Africa. Cabinet approved it in 2004 as a pilot for the national government's Breaking New Ground housing strategy, with the aim of replacing informal settlements beside the highway with a mix of rental, subsidised and bonded homes. The national Department of Housing, the provincial government of the Western Cape and the City of Cape Town ran it jointly. Housing Minister Lindiwe Sisulu called it "the biggest housing project ever undertaken by any Government."

Thubelisha Homes, a housing agency of the national government, was appointed to find contractors and manage delivery. It was closed in 2009, and the Housing Development Agency took the project over. Delivery ran well behind the first schedule and the targets changed more than once. The agency now reports that nearly 12,000 homes have been completed and handed over, against a plan of about 15,000 housing opportunities.

The project drew criticism from, among others, the Geneva-based Centre on Housing Rights and Evictions, the South African Auditor-General, the Western Cape Anti-Eviction Campaign, the constitutional law scholar Pierre De Vos and some of the residents it affected. Their concerns centred on the relocation of residents to Delft, delays and cost, the quality of the early buildings and rent levels. Officials have acknowledged early difficulties and point to the homes built since.

== Background ==
Cabinet adopted the N2 Gateway as a national pilot in September 2004. In January 2005 a fire in the Joe Slovo informal settlement in Langa destroyed about 3,000 shacks and left an estimated 12,000 people homeless. Residents were promised priority in the allocation of N2 Gateway housing. The government also said the project would help correct apartheid-era spatial planning by bringing people closer to workplaces, schools and clinics.

The planned scale and cost shifted repeatedly. Early plans called for about 22,000 units, and in May 2007 the cost was put at R3 billion, against an original completion date of June 2006. Thubelisha at one stage estimated that about 25,000 units would be built, roughly 70% for shack dwellers and 30% for backyard dwellers on the municipal housing waiting lists. A 2012 update from the Housing Development Agency referred to 13,477 units, and in 2015 the target was described as 20,000 units, originally due by 2014.

== Thubelisha Homes and the Housing Development Agency ==
A parliamentary committee heard in 2009 that Thubelisha had been troubled from the start, partly through under-costing and its involvement in the N2 Gateway, and that it was due to close on 31 July 2009. The Mail & Guardian reported that the Department of Housing guaranteed R241.5 million to help it wind down. The project was formally handed to the Housing Development Agency, which says it has managed it from planning and procurement through to construction and occupation, working with the provincial human settlements department and the City.

== Joe Slovo Phase 1 ==
To make way for Joe Slovo Phase 1 (also called N2 Gateway Phase 1), about 1,000 residents of Joe Slovo were moved to temporary relocation areas in Delft. The original plan was for 12,000 rental units in this phase, and 705 were built. Thubelisha told MPs that a survey before completion had suggested rents of R160 to R650 a month, but the flats were let at R500 to R1,200. Tenants began a rent boycott in 2007, supported by Joe Slovo residents, social movements such as the Anti-Eviction Campaign and civil society groups. One report at the time said that only one Joe Slovo resident had been able to afford a flat.

In August 2009 the Western Cape housing MEC, Bonginkosi Madikizela, acknowledged serious structural defects in the Phase 1 flats and said some units might have to be demolished.

The rental flats were handed to the City of Cape Town in 2013. In 2023 GroundUp reported that tenants, about 5,000 people in all, described leaking ceilings, mould and sewage problems, and that some had withheld rent since 2007. The City said the handover had not come with a maintenance budget and that most tenants had declined to sign leases, which limited repairs to the 118 who had. The City and the provincial department each said the other was better placed to answer questions about how the flats were built. The Public Protector's office inspected the flats in April 2023.

== Joe Slovo phases 2 and 3 ==
After Phase 1, the national government sought to move the remaining residents of the settlement, about 20,000 people, to temporary relocation areas in Delft so that building could continue on the site. Many residents refused, saying the move would take them far from work, and that Delft had few schools and a higher rate of crime. Some who had moved to Delft after the 2005 fire reported losing their jobs because they could not afford the transport into Cape Town, and Delft has no railway line.

The government won an eviction order in the Western Cape High Court, where Judge President John Hlophe ruled in its favour. Constitutional law commentators, including Pierre De Vos, criticised the decision. The residents appealed to the Constitutional Court. In August 2008 about 200 of them travelled to Johannesburg by train for the hearing, accompanied by the Anti-Eviction Campaign and by residents of Symphony Way, another settlement in dispute with the government over the project. The community law centre of the University of the Western Cape and the Centre on Housing Rights and Evictions were admitted as friends of the court in support of the residents, and judgment was reserved in August 2008.

On 10 June 2009, in Residents of Joe Slovo Community v Thubelisha Homes, the Constitutional Court ruled in favour of the eviction but on conditions. The government had to consult residents, 70% of the homes built on the Joe Slovo land had to go to current residents or those who had moved away, and the temporary accommodation had to be of a higher standard, with units of at least 24 square metres.

In August 2009 the new Minister of Human Settlements, Tokyo Sexwale, put the relocation on hold, and in September the Constitutional Court suspended its order. The government later told the court that it was concerned about the project's financial viability and about the impact of moving so many people, and proposed upgrading the settlement in place.

On 31 March 2011 the Court discharged the eviction order. It found that the government had not kept to the engagement timetable the Court had set, that redevelopment in place had become the most likely course, and that the 70% allocation was no longer needed because the government had said the whole project would go to current and former Joe Slovo residents. The developer, the provincial housing department and the national minister remained liable for half of the residents' legal costs. Building on the site then went ahead in phases. The first units of Joe Slovo Phase 3 were handed over in August 2012, in a development planned to reach 2,639 units.

== BNG houses in Delft ==
The N2 Gateway houses in Delft were built in the Delft 7 to 9 and Symphony areas. The Housing Development Agency reports that Delft 7 to 9 was completed in 2013, with almost 4,500 houses handed over. In December 2007, before the Symphony houses had been allocated, backyard dwellers from Delft occupied unfinished houses there. The Western Cape High Court granted an eviction order on 5 February 2008 and the occupiers were evicted on 19 February. Many of those evicted then lived on the pavement beside the site.

== Temporary relocation areas in Delft ==
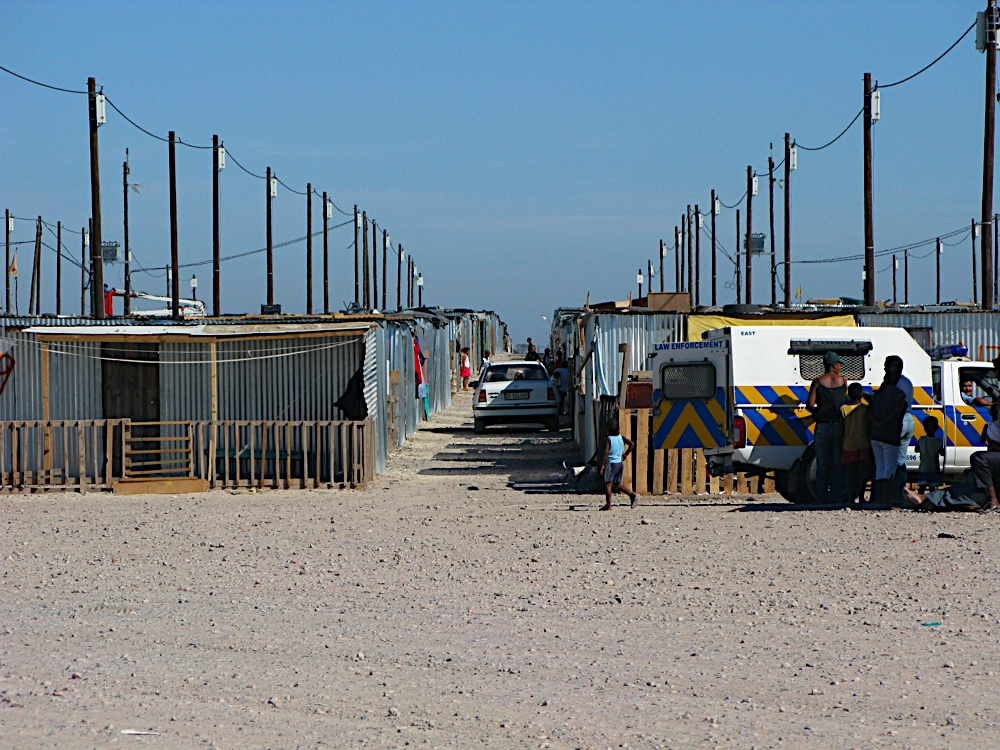
Blikkiesdorp temporary relocation area in 2009

Two temporary relocation areas (TRAs), sometimes called transit camps, in Delft were connected to the project.

The Delft TRA, nicknamed Tsunami and Thubelisha, was built by the City of Cape Town for Joe Slovo fire victims and was later managed by Thubelisha Homes on behalf of the national government. It housed people moved from Joe Slovo, Khayelitsha, Crossroads, Nyanga and Gugulethu. A 2007 study by the Development Action Group concluded that setting it up had made the affected households more vulnerable, heightened conflict in the community and carried a large financial cost for the municipality and possibly other departments, and that the policy aim had not been achieved and the expense could not be justified. In 2007 Chris Harris, a professor of geological sciences at the University of Cape Town, reported finding chrysotile and crocidolite (asbestos) in material at the site.

The Symphony Way TRA, which residents nicknamed Blikkiesdorp ("Tin Can Town"), was built and managed by the City of Cape Town. It housed people moved from the occupied N2 Gateway houses, with the first families arriving on 9 May 2008, as well as pavement dwellers from a nearby informal settlement. Early on it was criticised for its barbed-wire fencing, police-controlled access and the erosion of residents' social networks.

Blikkiesdorp was meant to be temporary but is still occupied. In 2017 GroundUp counted between 1,600 and 2,000 households living in tin shacks there. In March 2024 residents blocked Symphony Way with burning tyres to demand permanent houses, and some said they had been told their stay would last months. The City's mayoral committee member for human settlements, Carl Pophaim, said Blikkiesdorp had not been set up as a TRA but for people facing housing emergencies, and that it had since been decommissioned as an emergency site. He said qualifying residents were being moved into subsidised housing as opportunities arose, and that a housing project intended for Blikkiesdorp beneficiaries was on hold after murder and extortion.

== Later phases and current status ==
Boystown, a precinct near the airport, was among the last phases to be built. The Western Cape human settlements department said in April 2022 that the final beneficiaries had moved in, with about 1,500 beneficiaries from five informal settlements rehoused in the development.

President Jacob Zuma officially opened the project at Langa on 15 October 2015. He said more than 14,000 homes had been delivered, about 6,000 short of the 20,000 target. Two months earlier Sisulu, by then Minister of Human Settlements, had told the Housing Development Agency to finish the remaining phases by 2019 or sooner. As of November 2026, the agency's project page describes the project as complete, and also states that nearly 12,000 homes have been completed and handed over and that it will deliver approximately 15,000 housing opportunities across five precincts: New Rest, Delft 7 to 9, Delft Symphony, Boystown and Joe Slovo.

== Criticism ==
A special audit by the Auditor-General found mismanagement and widespread deficiencies in the planning, accounting, design, construction and execution of the project. In September 2009 the Centre on Housing Rights and Evictions published a report criticising the project for housing rights violations and for a lack of consultation with the poor residents affected by it. A 2007 University of Cape Town thesis concluded that the project had been rushed and poorly planned and had failed to deliver within its time frames.

Some critics argued that the project was partly a beautification of the route from the airport ahead of the 2010 FIFA World Cup, pointing to its visibility from the airport and to the relocation of shack dwellers away from the N2 corridor into Delft.

The government has acknowledged early problems. In his 2015 address Zuma said the project had met numerous hitches, including disagreement over which types of housing to build and who should benefit. The Housing Development Agency says that since taking over it has stabilised and advanced delivery.

== See also ==
- Joe Slovo Informal Settlement
- Residents of Joe Slovo Community v Thubelisha Homes
- Blikkiesdorp
- Symphony Way
- Delft
- N2 Gateway occupations
