= Bwabwa =

- Location in Malawi
- Coordinates: 11°23′41″S 33°47′34″E
- Country: Malawi
- Region: Northern Region
- District: Mzimba District
- Elevation: 1,200 m (3,900 ft)
- Time zone: +2

Bwabwa is a village in Northern Malawi west of Ekwendeni. The village has a dried up river and water is obtained from boreholes. It is named after the nearby Bwabwa Hill which is 1,512 metres high.

== Description ==
The effects of climate change are documented in Bwabwa. It rains there three times a year. The place had Rukuru River and it features Bwabwa hill. Boreholes are required to source good water. The hill has a prominence of 212 metres as it rises to 1,512 metres above sea level.

Anita Chitaya left Bwabwa on a quest to tell America about climate change

Bwabwa inspired the Canadian charity Love a Village. The founder of the charity, Julie Seath, met a woman called Maria in 2011 who lived in Bwabwa. Maria lived in a shelter she had constructed for herself and her three remaining children. Julie Seath was moved to return a year later with her friends and family to help Maria build a better home. Afterwards, they created the charity, Love a Village to help Bwabwa. The charity then moved on to other villages knowing that the local church had begun to support the Bwabwa community.

Local farmer Anita Chitaya experimented on her one acre farm. She lives there with her husband Christopher. She is a member of a group called Soils, Food and Healthy Communities (SFHC). The group tries new recipes and new crops. They have experimented with multi-cropping where a range of crops are planted in the same land. The locals have also adopted clay ovens which are locally manufactured. They require less wood to heat the food.

Bwabwa is one of four locations with experimental crops and weather stations. 25 families are involved in each village with an emphasis on gender inclusion. Another is at the village of Chisangano which has experience, like Bwabwa, with agroecology, the other two Kabwanda and Zombwe are later additions to the work. The principle investigators are SFHC's Laifolo Dakishoni and Professor Rachel Bezner Kerr of Cornell University.

In 2021 the film The Ants and the Grasshopper was released about Anita Chitaya. She had inspired the film and co-written the script. She had initially been a sceptic at the back of a village meeting. She narrated the story as the film described a journey she made to America to tell people there about the effects of climate change on Bwabwa. She went with another local leader, Dr Esther Lupafya, who is also a member and co-founder of the SFHC.
