= The Ants and the Grasshopper =

2021 film by Raj Patel and Zak Piper

- Theatrical release poster
- Directed by: Raj Patel; Zak Piper
- Written by: Anita Chitaya and Peter Mazunda
- Produced by: Cynthia Kane; Peter Mazunda; Rachel Wexler; Raj Patel; Zak Piper
- Narrated by: Anita Chitaya
- Cinematography: Clare Major; Peter Mazunda
- Edited by: Katerina Simic; John Farbrother
- Music by: Graham Reynolds
- Production companies: Kartemquin Films; Bungalow Town Productions; Collective Eye Films
- Distributed by: Giant Pictures (United States)
- Release dates: May 2021 (Mountainfilm, Telluride)
- Running time: 74 minutes
- Countries: United States, United Kingdom; Malawi
- Languages: English; Tumbuka

The Ants and the Grasshopper (also styled The Ants & the Grasshopper) is a 2021 documentary film directed by Raj Patel and Zak Piper. It follows Anita Chitaya, a farmer and community organiser from the village of Bwabwa in Malawi, as she travels across the United States trying to persuade Americans that climate change is real. The film was made with Kartemquin Films and had its world premiere at the Mountainfilm Festival in Telluride, Colorado, in May 2021, where Patel received the festival's Moving Mountains Award.

A five-part series drawn from the film was released by PBS in 2023, and a shortened version was broadcast in the PBS strand Doc World in May 2025.

== Synopsis ==
The film opens in Bwabwa, where the Rukuru River has dried up, and villagers queue to draw water from a single hole. Chitaya says the rains now come only about three times a year, and the village women draw water from boreholes that take even longer to refill.

Chitaya and her husband, Christopher, farm one acre, growing maize, beans, cassava, pumpkins, and pigeon peas. She works with Soils, Food and Healthy Communities (SFHC), a local organisation co-founded by Esther Lupafya, which uses discussion groups and drama to promote organic farming methods and a fairer division of household work between men and women. Through SFHC she also promotes fuel-saving clay stoves and recipes that make use of new crops.

One strand follows the pair's efforts to win over a neighbour, Winston, who regards fetching water, washing dishes, and pounding maize as women's work. Chitaya recounts that her husband abducted her into marriage, ending her hope of becoming a nun, and that he has since come to share the farm and household work with her.

Anita Chitaya (left) and Esther Lupafya in The Ants and the Grasshopper film

In the second half of the film, Chitaya and Lupafya travel to the United States, visiting Midwest farms and urban food cooperatives and meeting people in Iowa, Oakland, Detroit, and Washington, D.C. Among those they visit are the Rolling Acres Farm in Iowa and the Black Dirt Farm Collective in Maryland. An Iowa family of organic farmers, fellow Presbyterians, receive Chitaya sympathetically but are skeptical about climate change. Also in Iowa, the women meet a member of the Women, Food and Agriculture Network, an encounter the Eye for Film reviewer singled out as the film's most joyful. They spend only a short time with politicians, most of whom show little interest. By the end of the film, some of the farmers who had dismissed climate change begin to reconsider.

The film is narrated by Chitaya, who speaks in Tumbuka.

== Production ==
The film grew out of a larger planned "transmedia" project about people around the world doing innovative work on food, of which the Malawi story was one strand. Patel said filming began with documentary maker Steve James. According to Patel, James chose Chitaya as the central figure after noticing her among three skeptical women at the back of a village meeting at which the project was being introduced. Piper said that in 2017, when it became clear the wider project could not be completed, he and Patel decided the Malawi footage could support a feature film.

The directors originally conceived it as a film about gender and child nutrition; climate change became its central subject after Chitaya proposed travelling to the US to speak to Americans, a trip Patel says the filmmakers paid for by credit card. The filmmakers developed the narration by screening scenes for Chitaya in Malawi and recording her responses, a process Patel said also guided what stayed in the final cut. Chitaya and Peter Mazunda are credited as the film's writers in library catalogue records. Mazunda was first hired as a fixer and driver, and later became one of the film's cinematographers and producers. The executive producers were Julie Goldman, Gordon Quinn, Betsy Steinberg, Steve James and Jolene Pinder, and the score was composed by Graham Reynolds.

== Release ==
The film premiered at Mountainfilm in Telluride over the Memorial Day weekend of 2021, and was shown at the Sheffield DocFest in the United Kingdom in June 2021. Later in 2021 it played at festivals including NHdocs in New Haven, the Middlebury New Filmmakers Festival, the Ashland Independent Film Festival and the Human Rights Film Festival in Berlin, and toured the United Kingdom with the Take One Action Festival. The Scotland Malawi Partnership's funding allowed the film to shown to audiences offering voluntary donations. In November 2021, it was screened at the Nourish Scotland pavilion at the COP26 climate conference, with Patel speaking afterwards.

In the United States, the film was distributed by Giant Pictures, with question-and-answer screenings at Alamo Drafthouse cinemas in Los Angeles, San Francisco, Denver, Chicago, Austin and New York between 31 March and 6 April 2023 and a digital release on 11 April 2023. Outreach screenings were run with partner organisation Peace is Loud. In 2023 PBS released The Ants & the Grasshopper: The Series, a five-part version co-produced by Kartemquin and Peril and Promise, the climate reporting initiative of the WNET Group. A 55-minute version was broadcast as the fourth episode of the eighth season of Doc World on 25 May 2025.

== Reception ==
A July feature in The Guardian's "Our Unequal Earth" series described the film as an exploration of how power and privilege shape climate and food justice, and noted that it neither prescribes policy nor sets out to induce guilt. Patel told the newspaper that the film was meant as a way into harder conversations about land, farm labour and the environmental costs of the food system.

Jennie Kermode of Eye for Film gave the film four and a half stars out of five, writing that it plainly demonstrates how much well-off Americans have to learn from poor black women farmers.

Leslie Felperin of The Guardian gave it three stars out of five, praising Chitaya as intelligent and endlessly patient but finding the film's closing optimism at times forced and marked by "false equivalences".

Interviewed on Democracy Now! in August 2021, Patel said the film set out to "decolonise" thinking about climate and health by foregrounding the knowledge of peasant farmers.

== Accolades ==
Year	Award
2021	Mountainfilm - Moving Mountains Award - won
2021	Middlebury New Filmmakers Festival - Gaia Prize for Environmental Filmmaking - won
2021	Centre Film Festival - Best Feature - won
2022	Wild & Scenic Film Festival - Jury Award - won
2022	American Conservation Film Festival - Green Fire Award - won

Sources for the table.
