= Anna-Marie de Vos =

South African lawyer and former Judge

- Born: January 13, 1960 (age 66)
- Education: University of Pretoria; Unisa
- Occupations: Former judge; senior advocate in private practice

Anna-Marie de Vos is a South African lawyer and former Judge of the High Court South Africa, Transvaal Provincial Division. She now serves as senior counsel in private practice, as a member of the George Bar Association. As a lesbian with her partner, they both took on the law in South Africa that prevented same sex couples from being able to adopt. They later won the case and gay adoption was legalised in South Africa in 2002, making South Africa the first and the only current country in Africa where joint adoption is legal.

== Biography ==
After her admission as an advocate to the High Court of South Africa in 1985, De Vos was granted senior status as an advocate in 1997. In 2001 she was appointed a Judge of the High Court South Africa, Transvaal Provincial Division, a position she held until 2006. She now serves as senior counsel in private practice, as a member of the George Bar Association. De Vos is a Director and Trustee of the Legal Centre for Women and Children, and serves as a member of the Financial Services Board.

== Education ==
De Vos graduated from the University of Pretoria with a B.Juris degree before completing a LL. B. and Mater of Laws (Intellectual Property Law) at the University of South Africa in 1997.
