= Symphony Way Pavement Dwellers =

Coordinates: 33°58′12″S 18°37′31″E

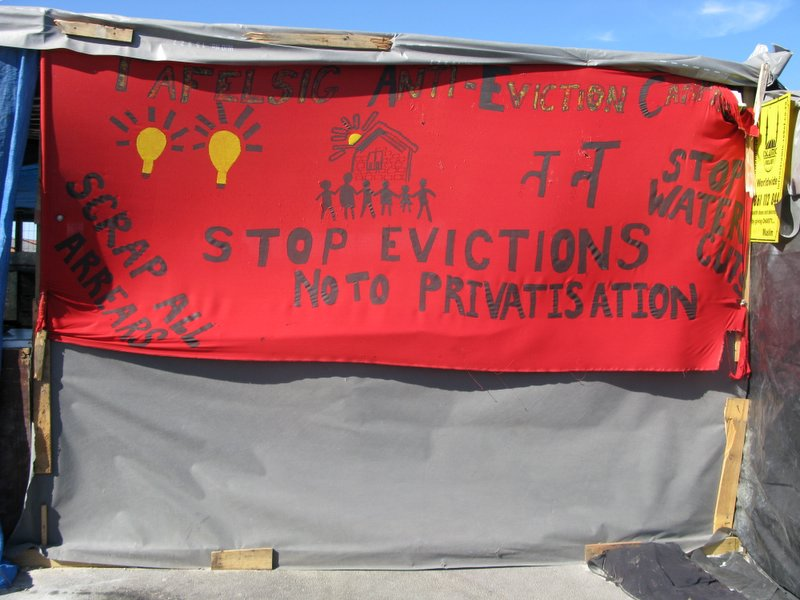
Western Cape Anti-Eviction Campaign Office, Symphony Way

Symphony Way Informal Settlement was a small community of pavement dwellers (shack dwellers who live on the pavement) that lived on Symphony Way, a main road in Delft, South Africa, from February 2008 until late 2009. They were a group of families that were evicted in February 2008 from the N2 Gateway Houses.

== History of the community ==
In December 2007, Frank Martin, a Democratic Alliance Councillor and City of Cape Town mayoral committee member, issued letters to an estimated 300 families in Delft, which granted them permission to move into the houses, and stated that he would accept full responsibility for the consequences. Backyard-dwellers then occupied over 1,500 houses in the N2 Gateway.

In February, over 1,500 families were evicted from the N2 Gateway houses. This was a violent eviction which included the use of rubber bullets. Over 20 people were injured including many women and children. Pictures and videos have circulated taking account of the violence including the shooting of a three-year-old child who was shot three times.

In February 2008, residents set up an informal settlement on Symphony Way despite efforts by the City of Cape Town to evict them and move them into a nearby Temporary Relocation Area (TRA) nicknamed Blikkiesdorp. Residents remained occupying the road for 21 months claiming that the TRAs like Blikkiesdorp are created to dump people.

On 19 October 2009 a Western Cape High Court judge granted an order for the eviction of 103 families to Blikkiesdorp. The majority of residents reluctantly moved off Symphony Way (where they felt safer) and into Blikkiesdorp (which is notorious for crime) in November 2009. In Blikkiesdorp, they have continued to organise under the banner of Symphony Way and have continued their struggle for land and housing.

== Community structure and philosophy ==
The Symphony Way Pavement Dwellers, also known as the Delft-Symphony Anti-Eviction Campaign, were organised through elected committees that dealt with issues important to the community. The committees were part of the Western Cape Anti-Eviction Campaign umbrella structure and include an executive committee, a children's committee and a night-time crime patrol committee. Their primary focus is housing but the committees also deal with other internal and external issues that are important to the community. Residents resort to the following strategies in their attempts to get issues solved: direct action, legal challenges, popular education, media press statements, actions of solidarity.

In August 2008, a number of Symphony Way residents received publicity when they accompanied over 100 Joe Slovo residents to protest outside the Constitutional Court in Johannesburg.

== The Symphony Way book ==
The Symphony Way Pavement Dwellers have written an anthology of their struggle for housing and human rights entitled No Land! No House! No Vote! Voices from Symphony Way (2011). The foreword is by activist and author Raj Patel and the Introduction is by Former UN Special Rapporteur for housing Miloon Kothari. The book includes factual stories relating to both public and domestic violence, violations of justice, xenophobia, their struggle for land and housing and their assertion of dignity.

== The Symphony Way children ==
The community made an effort to take care of its children. It set up a creche on the pavement as well as starting their own netball and soccer teams and hosting photography exhibitions by the children.

== Reports on the N2 Gateway featuring Symphony Way ==
- 2009 Report on the N2 Gateway by the Centre on Housing Rights and Evictions (COHRE)
- Western Cape Housing Crisis: Writings on Joe Slovo and Delft by Martin Legassick, February 2008
- Housing and Evictions at the N2 Gateway Project in Delft by Kerry Chance, May 2008
