= World-Ecology =

World-Ecology is a global conversation of academics, activists, and artists committed to understanding human relations of power, production, and environment-making in the web of life. An evolving conversation rather than a theory, the world-ecology approach is unified by a critique of Nature-Society dualisms, a world-historical interpretation of today's planetary crisis, and an emphasis on the intersection of race, class, and gender in capitalism's environmental history. Key figures in the world-ecology conversation include Jason W. Moore, Sharae Deckard, Raj Patel, Christian Parenti, Tony Weis, Neil Brenner, Kerstin Oloff, Andrej Grubačić, and Marion Dixon. Since 2015, the World-Ecology Research Network has sponsored an annual conference.

== Lineages and Origins of the World-Ecology Conversation ==
World-ecology draws on a diversity of transdisciplinary, critical traditions across the human and physical sciences. The hyphenated term world-ecology derives from Jason W. Moore's reinterpretation of Karl Marx, Fernand Braudel and Immanuel Wallerstein. For Braudel and Wallerstein, the rise of capitalism must be understood as the emergence of a world-economy: not the "economy of the world," but a regional division of labor bounded by its spatially necessary division of labor. The history of capitalism therefore marks the geographical expansion of a world-economy that becomes global only in the twentieth century. In Moore's early formulation, the capitalist world-economy could not be separated from its environmental history: capitalism is a "world-ecology" whose geopolitics and economic life was rooted in a particularly dynamic—and violent—relationship towards webs of life. This was evident in two major ways, Moore argued. First, capitalism as a system of endless capital accumulation required a constant search for new, lost-cost natures—including enslaved humans. Second, the destruction and depletion effected by capitalist monocultures and extractive systems exhausted cheap natures discovered in a previous era, setting in motion new frontiers of violent accumulation. Just as Wallerstein had earlier emphasized the capitalist world-economy as a synthesis of geopolitics and transnational commodity systems, Moore proposed world-ecology as a synthesis of world-economy approaches with environmental history in its widest sense.

== Relation to capitalism ==
Capitalism is a concept that is often discussed in conjunction to world-ecology.

The world-ecology conversation foregrounds the historical development of class society across the Holocene. Most world-ecological research focuses on historical capitalism, understood as a differentiated unity of power, profit and life.

The main reason to include capitalism within the new research paradigm is to view capitalism as a world-ecology: In this view, traditional concepts of capitalism are reshaped to remedy conceptual ambiguities: Accept that capitalism, nature and government function as a single whole rather than as separate entities.

The suggestion that capitalism should be viewed as a World-Ecology was made by professor Jason W Moore, - a perspective that is often referred to as a "capitalist world-ecology". Moore theorizes that the idea of "cheapening", or degrading key spheres of life, is elemental in cycles of capital, power, and nature that exist in the modern capitalist World-Ecology system. As a whole, this concept may be classified as the Capitalocene. The idea of the Capitalocene designates capitalism as an ultimate driver of climate change, supported by evidence of cheap production and various dimensions of inequality.

Moore's suggestion has been adapted and extended by other academics, in their papers on topics related to capitalism: One of them is Aaron Jakes, who utilized the view of capitalism as a world-ecology to analyse the historical case of Egypt, when the British government conducted foreign affairs in terms of cotton production. The view of capitalism as world-ecology discards the notion that nature and societies are mostly unrelated and separate entities, and clarifies that nature and societies form an interwoven system of intricate relations.

== World-Ecology and world literature ==
As world ecology relates to the correction of past views on capitalism and nature, in part, the topic of world-ecology in conjunction with world literature concerns the modification of the representation of capitalism in literary forms. Specifically, academics suggest that the inclusion of world-ecology in world literature involves the restructuring of literary works to depict capitalism as a world-ecology. Another suggestion made was that the influence of world ecology on world literature should drive a focus on world literature where content coverage of literary forms across the world is highly extensive, because world ecology is defined by the macro interaction of a wide range of systems. However, it is believed that such totality in content coverage has not yet been wholly achieved by any contemporary world ecological literary form.

It can be difficult to accurately represent the application of world ecology in the context of a particular topic, as complexity makes it challenging to avoid misapprehension.

In an example view where the world-ecology is taken to be the planet, which is constituted of sub-systems and environments that produce results which may be positive, neutral or negative (e.g. environmental damage), it is important for world-ecological literary forms in this context to have the vocabulary to accurately describe the function of the world-ecology as a whole, and this turn should highlight some of the negative processes within the world-ecology, such as environmental crises. This highlights the importance of use of vocabulary in world-ecological literary form and that world literature, if structured correctly, can be used in understanding the emerging points of the world-ecology in the context of the earth.

A distinct feature of world-ecological texts is that they are to contain a broad totality in their coverage of content describing the complex interwoven functions of substructures in the world-ecology. This is to be differentiated from other literary forms, which may be narrowed in content coverage due to focusing on topics specific to the literary forms. This is a significant difference between world-ecological literary forms and literary works of other forms. Certain academics consider such literary forms that do not attempt to incorporate the totality of the world-ecology to be texts of lesser consciousness.

Academics have suggested that misrepresentation in world-ecological literature can have catastrophic effects, because conveying incorrect information can cause issues of concern to be mistakenly disregarded. Also, it is said that reading methodologies must also be integrated for readers to correctly understand any true information produced by world-literary forms.

== Inclusive Topics ==
=== Marxism ===
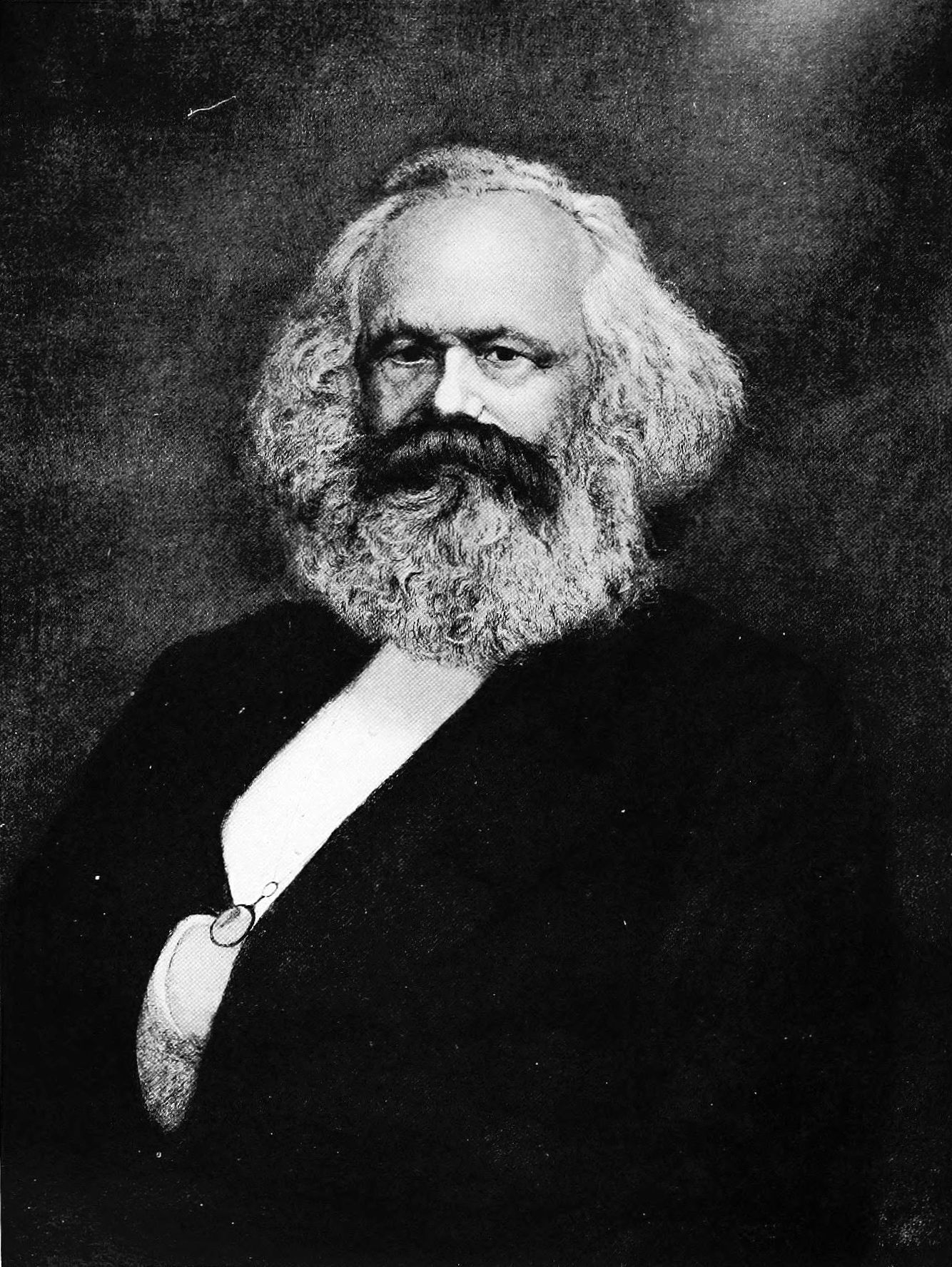
Karl Marx was a German philosopher that founded the theories of Marxism.

Some relevant laws of Marxism have been used to aid in explanations relating to and to build on arguments of world-ecology, such arguments that state that capitalism and nature production function in an intertwined manner (the world-ecological perspective). In an academic paper professor James W Moore has constructed a theory on world-ecology with aid from a law of Marxism, specifically, he referred to Marxism general law of under production to conduct analysis, draw conclusions and suggest points. In another text Jason W Moore has also referred to Marxism's law of value to make suggestions on the view of capitalism as a world-ecology. Other academics have also applied concepts of Marxism in conjunction with world ecology to explain concepts, particularly concepts that work with the theorisation of capitalism as a world-ecology.

=== Environmentalism ===
World-Ecology has a focus on the dual interaction of human activity and environment production, it views environments as a dynamic systems of various states that influence and are influenced by human activity, in the sense that humans create environments which in turn create humans. The view of the relation of world-ecology and environmentalism has been applied to a variety of cases by academics, for example Yoan Molinero uses it to analyse food distribution in agriculture.

In the view of environmentalism, world-ecology has also been applied by Sharae Deckard of the University College Dublin in an academic text to view the planet itself as a world-ecology, where the earth (the world-ecology in the context) and its substructures are analysed in world-ecological literary forms for evaluation of issues relating to the methodologies of contemporary world-literature.

Sharae Deckard mentions that the environment of the region of the Caribbean can be viewed as a constituent part of the world-ecology, further, the environment of the Caribbean within the world-ecology has dynamically changed due to interaction with other structures within the world-ecology, such structures include human communities, slave trades and actions that altered the botanical contents of the region and therefore the region itself. This shows how the interactions of substructures within the world-ecology can alter the environment of the sub structures and therefore the world-ecology itself.

In the notion of environments, world-ecology suggests that nature cannot be saved from degradation but can only be transformed.

== Associated organisations ==
=== The World-Ecology Research Network ===
The world-ecology research network is an organisation based in Binghamton in the United States of America. Its aim is to conduct research on historical events with the frame of mind that human activity has produced and is produced in nature. The World-Ecology research networks hosts regular conferences and various events that have a relation to world-ecology, academic texts and articles about world-ecology and relevant related topics are also published on their website.

==== Contributors ====
Several academics have contributed to the development and the advocacy for world-ecology some of which include:

===== Jason W Moore =====
Jason W Moore is a professor of Sociology at the Binghamton University in the United States of America. Moore has been accredited for shaping the view of capitalism as a world-ecology.

===== Sharae Deckard =====
Sharae Deckard is a professor of world literature at University College Dublin. Sharae Deckard has published a number of papers on topics related to world-ecology.

== History ==
In terms of history world-ecology relates to a series of world-ecological revolutions that occurred in the past in eras such as the 17th century, in locations such as Brazil as well as South East Asia, such revolutions were based on the want for capital by societal communities within nations and occurred globally over several locations. The revolutions were determined by and effected by the nature of the individual socio-ecologies. Apart from Brazil and South East Asia, revolutions also took place in Europe and North America making the event of historical world-ecological revolutions a global historical topic.

The history of capitalism has also been studied to better understand the current notion of capitalism as world-ecological, in such studies Jason W Moore views the history of capitalism to be related to environmental history, thus establishing a link between the two studies. He also discusses that capitalism as viewed in the past can also be viewed as world-ecology to aid explanation of a concept within a certain context. World-ecology also works with the history of societies to analyse their effects in the world-ecology in the past and their contribution to the current state of the world-ecology, where such contributions can be beneficial or undesirable.

World-ecology also relates to history in the sense that it aims to deconstruct past (both recent and long term) notions of the strict separation of nature and societies, by forming a concept that suggest that the two structures function closely together.

As mentioned in the "related topics section" the world-ecology is closely coupled to the economic historical concept of Marxism.

== Key Readings ==
- Campbell, Chris, and Michael Niblett, ed. 2016. The Caribbean: Aesthetics, World-Ecology, Politics. Liverpool: Liverpool University Press.
- Goff, Stan. 2018. Mammon's Ecology. Eugene, OR: Cascade Books.
- Moore, Jason W. 2015. Capitalism in the Web of Life. London: Verso.
- Moore, Jason W., ed. 2016. Anthropocene or Capitalocene? Nature, History and the Crisis of Capitalism. Oakland, CA: PM Press.
- Patel, Raj, and Jason W. Moore. 2017. A History of the World in Seven Cheap Things. Berkeley: University of California Press.
- Weis, Tony. 2013. The Ecological Hoofprint. London: Zed.

== See also ==
- Sociology
- Economics
- Marxism
- Philosophy
