= Stuffed and Starved =

Non-fiction book

Stuffed and Starved: The Hidden Battle for the World Food System is a non-fiction book written by Raj Patel. It was published in 2008 by Melville House Publishing. Stuffed and Starved looks at the inequities of the world food system from the beginning to the end of the conventional food chain, from producers to manufacturers and distributors to consumers.

According to Naomi Klein, Stuffed and Starved is "One of the most dazzling books I have read in a very long time. The product of a brilliant mind, and a gift to a world hungering for justice."

== Bibliography ==
- Stuffed and Starved: Markets, Power and the Hidden Battle for the World Food System, Raj Patel, Portobello Books Ltd (2008) ISBN 1-84627-011-1
