= Anita Chitaya =

- Anita Chitaya
- Citizenship: Malawian
- Occupations: Smallholder farmer, community promoter, climate activist
- Known for: The Ants and the Grasshopper 2021 documentary

Anita Chitaya is a Malawian smallholder farmer, community organiser and climate activist from the Mzimba District in Northern Malawi. She is the subject and narrator of the documentary The Ants and the Grasshopper (2021). This documentary was directed by Raj Patel and Zak Piper and she was a co-writer. The film follows her quest to persuade Americans that climate change is real.

== Work with soils, food and healthy communities ==
Chitaya lives in Bwabwa in Northern Malawi. She joined Soils, Food and Healthy Communities (SFHC), a farmer-led research organisation based at Ekwendeni Hospital in Mzimba District, in 2001 as a participating farmer and member of its Farmer Research Team. Chitaya became a community promoter in 2009, training fellow farmers in agroecological methods and encouraging more equal divisions of labour and resources between men and women in farming households. She has been described as a long time community promoter for SFHC, whose work includes visiting neighbouring households to discuss soil fertility, crop choices and gender roles.

In 2017 Chitaya was interviewed for a Farm Radio International script on farmers' use of indigenous pesticidal plants under the Malawi Farmer-to-Farmer Agroecology (MAFFA) project. She is listed as the co-author of a peer-reviewed study on participatory agroecological research and climate-change adaptation led by Rachel Bezner Kerr.

== The Ants and the Grasshopper ==
Chitaya (right) and Raj Patel (centre)

Filming began in 2012 when Patel first travelled to Malawi, and the documentary took about 10 years to complete. The film was produced by Kartemquin Films together with Bungalow Town Productions; Chitaya is credited as narrator and for additional camera. In it she travels to the United States with fellow Malawians, including SFHC Director Esther Lupafya, meeting farmers in Iowa, communities in Oakland and Detroit, and legislators in Washington, D.C.

The film's American journey was Chitaya's proposal; according to the directors, they had set out to make a film about gender and child nutrition in Malawi, and it became a film about climate change when she resolved to go to the United States and speak to Americans herself. The directors planned to use a celebrity narrator but concluded that the story was hers to tell; they returned to Malawi to show her scenes from the edit and record her responses, and Patel has said her choices also guided which scenes stayed in the film. She and Peter Mazunda, the film's Malawian producer and cinematographer, are credited with writing the narration. Patel has written that the title is also hers, taken not from Aesop's fable but from her observation of ants in her village carrying, together, loads far heavier than any one could lift.

The film premiered at Mountainfilm in Telluride in May 2021, where Patel received the 2021 Moving Mountains Award, and had its international premiere at Sheffield DocFest in June 2021. It was released theatrically in the United States by Giant Pictures in Spring 2023 and broadcast on PBS's Doc World in 2025. A five-part companion series, The Ants &the Grasshopper: The Series, co-produced by Kartemquin and WNET's Peril and Promise Initiative, was released by PBS in 2023.

Reviewing the film for the Guardian in September 2022, the critic praised Chitaya as intelligent and patient, but found the film's optimistic ending forced. Patel has described her approach as a "theory of change" in which taking a problem to someone's doorstep makes it impossible to ignore.

== Public speaking ==
Chitaya delivered the closing keynote at the Agriculture, Nutrition and Health (ANH) Academy Week in Lilongwe on 30 June 2023, speaking in Chitumbuka with simultaneous translation, following an in-person screening of the film on 28 June.

== Personal life ==
A review of the film in The Guardian describes Chitaya raising crops with her husband on a 4,000 m^{2} (1 acre) of poor soil and persuading him to share household work that was conventionally regarded as women's work. The same review reports that she had hoped to become a nun before her husband abducted her into marriage.
