= Soils, Food and Healthy Communities =

Non-profit organisation based in Malawi

- Abbreviation: SFHC
- Founded: 2000
- Founder: Esther Lupafya, Rachel Bezner Kerr
- Headquarters: Ekwendeni, Malawi
- Methods: SFHC uses participatory research, agroecology and gender-equity training to improve soil fertility, food security and child nutrition
- Director: Esther Lupafya
- Key people: Esther Lupafya (director); Laifolo Dakishoni (deputy director); Anita Chitaya (community promoter)
- Website: https://soilandfood.org/

Soils, Food and Healthy Communities (SFHC) is a farmer-led non-profit organisation based in Ekwendeni in Northern Malawi, with work in Dedza. It began in 2000 as a project with thirty farmers and uses participatory research, agroecology and gender-equality training to improve soil fertility, food security and child nutrition. Its work is the subject of the 2021 documentary The Ants and the Grasshopper.

== History ==
SFHC grew out of a meeting between Rachel Bezner Kerr, then a Canadian masters student, and Esther Lupafya, who was the maternal and child health coordinator at Ekewendeni Hospital and had seen child malnutrition rise after fertiliser subsidies were withdrawn in the 1990s. The two launched a pilot project with 30 people in seven villages, working with volunteer farmer researchers to test which legumes could be intercropped locally, and added recipe demonstrations so that families could use what they grew. The project was initially run from Ekwendeni Hospital, which published its first-phase report for Canada's International Development Research Centre in 2004.

Interviews with participating families showed that household conflict over decision-making and the division of labour was limiting the benefits of higher yields, and the project added gender training alongside its farming work.

In October 2012, SFHC and Ekewndeni Hospital launched the Malawi Farmer-to-Farmer Agroecology project (MAFFA) with Western University, Chancellor College, the University of Manitoba, Cornell University, Presbyterian World Service and Development and the Canadian Foodgrains Bank, extending the work to Dedza District in Central Malawi.

== Approach ==
Each participating village elects one man and one woman to a volunteer Farmer Research Team, whose members run experiments, distribute seed and pass on what they learn to other farmers in the Ekwendeni area. By 2021 the organisation reported more than 400 farmer Research Team members in 209 villages, supported by 13 community promoters who use song, dance and drama in their outreach. Writing in the Scientific American, Raj Patel reported that SFHC had grown from 30 farmers to more than 6,000 people across 200 villages.

== Recognition ==
SFHC was an award recipient in the Young Projects category of the 2017 Lush Spring Prize. It was profiled in the Global Alliance for the Future of Food's Beacons of Hope series on food-system transformation.

== In film ==
The Ants and the Grasshopper (2021) directed by Raj Patel and Zak Piper, follows SFHC community promoter Anita Chitaya and Esther Lupafya as they travel across the United States to talk to farmers and officials about climate change.
