= Blikkiesdorp =

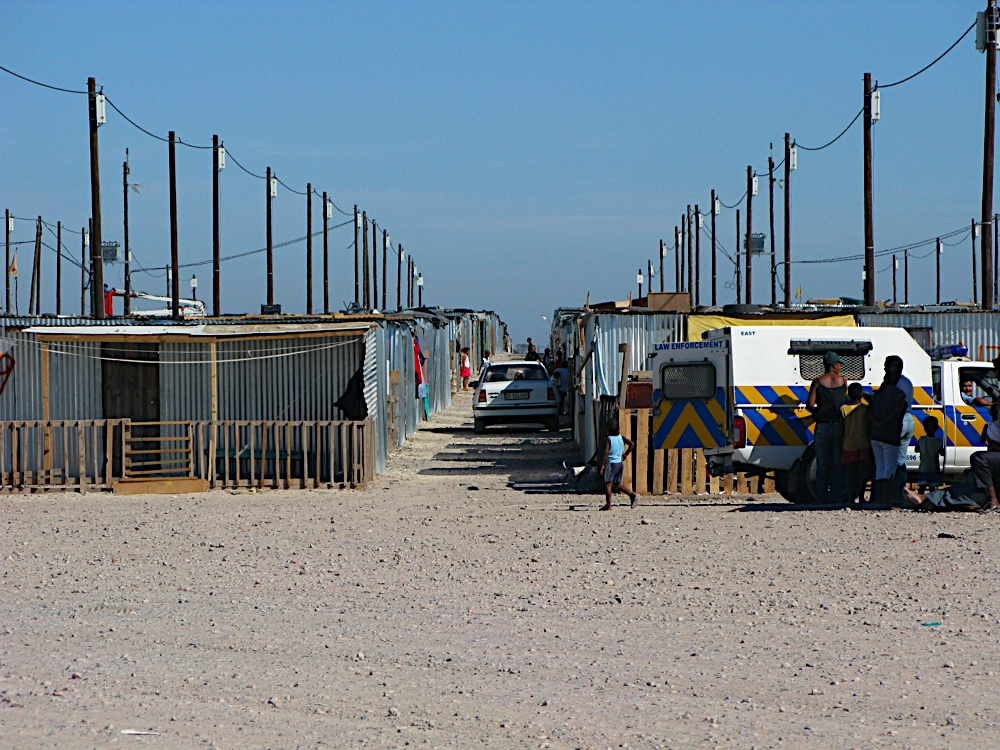
- Photo of Blikkiesdorp Temporary Relocation Area

- Location within Western Cape Location within South Africa
- Coordinates: 33.981°S 18.631°E
- Country: South Africa
- Province: Western Cape
- Municipality: City of Cape Town
- Established: 2007
- Time zone: UTC+2 (SAST)

Symphony Way Temporary Relocation Area in Delft, Cape Town, better known by its nickname Blikkiesdorp, is a relocation camp in South Africa made up of corrugated iron shacks. Blikkiesdorp, which is Afrikaans for "Tin Can Village", was given its name by residents because of the row-upon-row of tin-like, one-room structures throughout the settlement.

== Settlement structure ==
Blikkiesdorp was built by the City of Cape Town in 2007 in response to a court order. It contains approximately 1,600 one-room structures. According to government officials, it cost over 30 million rand to build.

The structures have walls and roofs made of thin galvanised corrugated iron sheets. They are of 18 square meters in size. Ablution, sanitation, and water facilities are shared between four structures.

== Conditions and criticisms ==
Blikkiesdorp is regarded as unsafe and it has become well known for its high crime rate, its substandard living conditions, and its extremely hot or cold, windy and sandy living environment. Residents have been reported to be suffering from depression.

It has been called an informal settlement by the city of Cape Town officials despite its formal structure being built by the government. In response to the criticisms, the city has called Blikkiesdorp the safest informal settlement in Cape Town. It has also been compared to a concentration camp by residents and in national and international media.

The City of Cape Town has been criticised for its role in creating Blikkiesdorp. Premier Helen Zille and Mayor Dan Plato have come under fire from residents on many occasions. On 18 November 2009 Dan Plato was visibly harassed by residents who claimed he had lied about when they would receive better housing.

NGOs, international human rights organisations, and the Anti-Eviction Campaign have publicly criticised the conditions in Blikkiesdorp and how they say it is used to reinforce the eviction of poor families especially to make way for the 2010 FIFA World Cup. Residents have also threatened to burn down Blikkiesdorp because of the bad conditions in the settlement. Ahead of the 2010 World Cup the British anti-poverty charity War on Want created a virtual model of Blikkiesdorp featuring videos of residents talking about conditions in the settlement.

Blikkiesdorp has also been compared with the alien camp from the international hit movie District 9 on numerous occasions. This even earned it a front page spread in the South African tabloid The Daily Voice.

== Evictions ==
Blikkiesdorp has been instrumental in relocating residents evicted from elsewhere in the city. Many evicted residents of Salt River and Woodstock have found themselves in the relocation camp almost 30 kilometers away from town. It has been called a dumping ground for unwanted and or homeless people from all over Cape Town. The evicted Symphony Way Pavement Dwellers were moved to Blikkiesdorp in October 2009 after occupying Symphony Way for almost two years.

== Police brutality ==
The South African Police Service (SAPS) has been implicated in draconian policing measures in Blikkiesdorp Temporary Relocation Area in Delft, Cape Town. Police have been accused of suppression of freedoms and illegal curfews. They have also been accused of gratuitous violence against innocent bystanders during drug raids and turning the settlement into a concentration camp.

== Films and books ==
- No Land! No House! No Vote! Voices from Symphony Way is an anthology written by the Symphony Way Pavement Dwellers about their - at the time - pending eviction to Blikkiesdorp
- 'Tin Town', a short documentary on the Symphony Way community in Blikkiesdorp
- Tin Town: the unaccountable cost of the 2010 World Cup
- 'Is Blikkiesdorp Home?'
- Blikkiesdorp Project
