= Joe Slovo, Cape Town =

Joe Slovo
- Location within Western Cape Location within South Africa
- Coordinates: 33°57′07″S 18°32′03″E
- Country: South Africa
- Province: Western Cape
- Municipality: City of Cape Town
- Time zone: UTC+2 (SAST)
- PO box: 9323

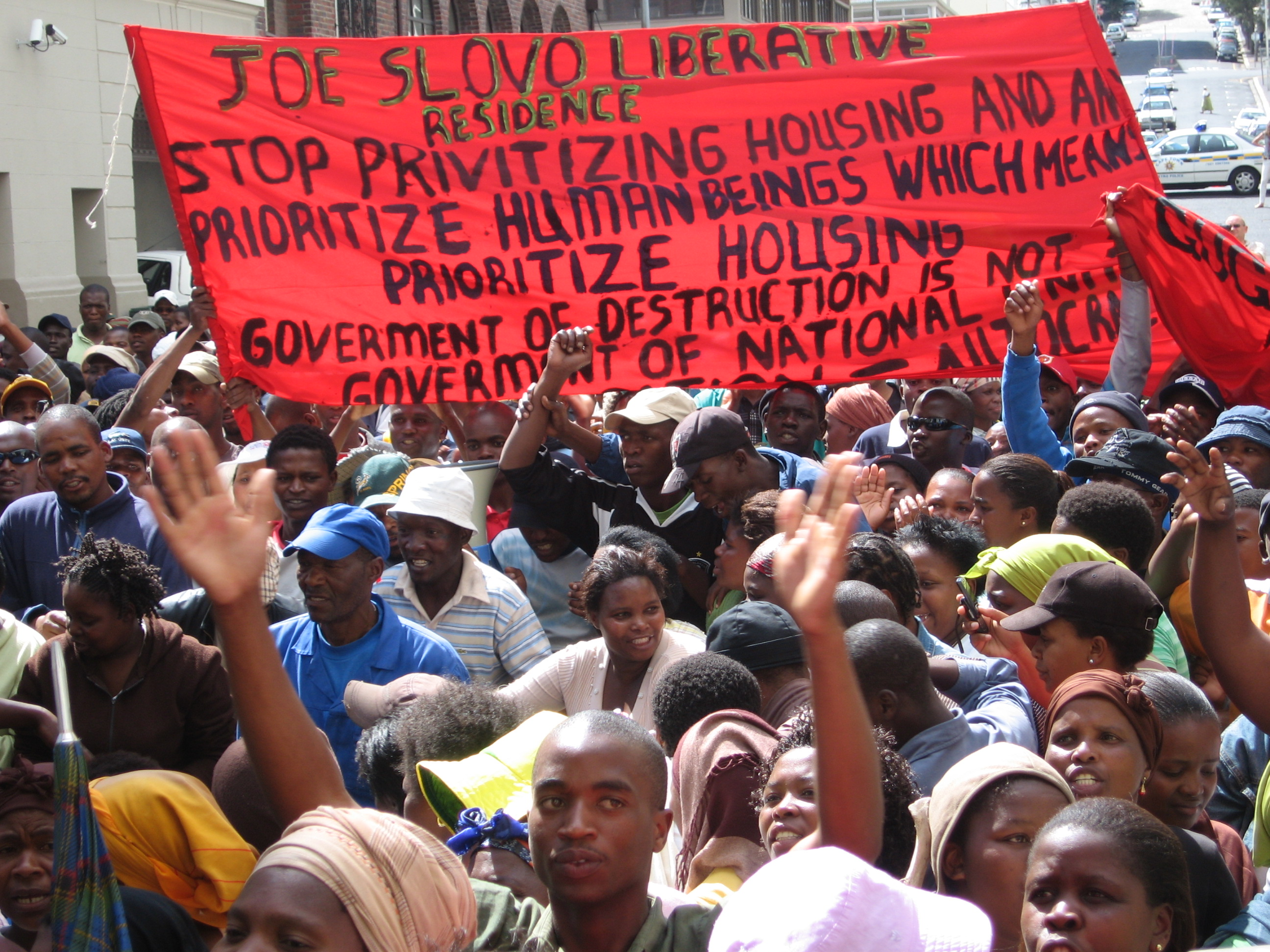
Joe Slovo mass protest at the Cape High Court in December 2007

Joe Slovo is an informal settlement in Langa, Cape Town. Like many other informal settlements, it was named after former housing minister and anti-Apartheid activist, Joe Slovo. With over 20,000 residents, Joe Slovo is one of the largest informal settlements in South Africa.

While residents have been fighting for 15 years for their right to live in Langa, the settlement recently came into prominence when it began to oppose the national pilot housing project of minister Lindiwe Sisulu called The N2 Gateway.

Residents have opposed the government's request that they be forcibly removed to Delft, a new township on the outskirts of the city. After a High Court ruling by controversial Judge John Hlophe in favor of the Government, many experts in constitutional law have claimed the ruling to be unjust and against the South African Constitution.

Since then, residents have appealed the decision and taken it to the South African Constitutional Court. In August 2008, about 200 Joe Slovo residents travelled by train to Johannesburg, spent the night at the Methodist Church in Braamfontein, and arrived the morning early at the Constitutional Court to protest proposed evictions. They were accompanied in solidarity by the Anti-Eviction Campaign as well as residents from Symphony Way, an informal settlement that is also in conflict with the government over the N2 Gateway Housing Project.

The Centre on Housing Rights and Evictions and the Community Law Centre from the University of Cape Town, who joined the case as friends of the court, argued that the mass relocation would significantly impact residents' quality of life.

During the case, Constitutional Court judges expressed their concern over Judge John Hlophe's High Court ruling. Still, judgment has been reserved.

== Reports on the N2 Gateway ==
- 2009 Report on the N2 Gateway by the Centre on Housing Rights and Evictions (COHRE)
- Western Cape Housing Crisis: Writings on Joe Slovo and Delft by Martin Legassick, February 2008
- Housing and Evictions at the N2 Gateway Project in Delft by Kerry Chance, May 2008

== See also ==
- Symphony Way Pavement Dwellers
- Western Cape Anti-Eviction Campaign
- N2 Gateway
