= Delft, Western Cape =

Township on the Cape Flats in Cape Town

Delft
- Street map of Delft

- Location within Western Cape Location within South Africa Location within Africa
- Coordinates: 33°57′56″S 18°38′40″E
- Country: South Africa
- Province: Western Cape
- Municipality: City of Cape Town
- Main Place: Cape Town

Government
  - Councillor: Nobanathi Matutu (Lutango) (Ward 106) (ANC); Phumla Tause (Ward 24) (ANC)

Area
  - Total: 11.08 km^{2} (4.28 sq mi)

Population (2011)
  - Total: 152,030
  - Density: 13,720/km^{2} (35,540/sq mi)

Racial makeup (2011)
  - Black African: 46.2%
  - Coloured: 51.5%
  - Indian/Asian: 0.3%
  - White: 0.1%
  - Other: 1.8%

First languages (2011)
  - Afrikaans: 47.0%
  - Xhosa: 37.8%
  - English: 9.4%
  - Other: 5.8%
- Time zone: UTC+2 (SAST)
- Postal code (street): 7102
- PO box: 7100
- Area code: 021

Delft is a residential area in the Northern Suburbs of Cape Town, South Africa. It is situated next to the Cape Town International Airport, Belhar, and Blue Downs. It is known for its recreational events and youth empowerment organizations such as the Enkosi Foundation. The community has established a motherbody organisation called the Delft Community Development Forum. Delft is a community that consists of numerous government built housing projects such as the N2 Gateway. In 2022 Delft was the fastest growing community in Cape Town.

== History ==
Delft was established in 1989. It is a rapidly expanding community found within District D: Tygerberg. This community was originally established as an integrated service land project for 'coloureds' and 'blacks'.

== Geography and demographics ==
Delft is situated approximately 26 km east of Cape Town Central Business District, and approximately 7.5 km from Bellville. It was established to be one of Cape Town's first mixed race township including coloured and black residents. In 2000, it had a population between 25,000 and 92,000 inhabitants.

According to the 2011 census, Delft was 51% Coloured and 46% Black African with 3% "other". The dominant first languages are Afrikaans and Xhosa while English is widely used as second language. The majority of residents have not finished their matric. Official unemployment levels are at about 43% (although unofficially, this might be much higher).

Much of Delft consists of government housing projects. The newest projects are the Symphony which is the main part of the N2 Gateway Pilot Project as well as Temporary Relocation Areas (TRAs) such as Tsunami and the Symphony Way TRA.

== Subdivisions ==
Delft is a large residential area located next to Cape Town International Airport. It is divided into seven sections: Delft South (also known as Suburban), Voorbrug, Leiden (Delft Central), Eindhoven, Roosendal, The Hague, and the newly developed Symphony section. Delft South is predominantly home to Xhosa-speaking residents. Leiden (Delft Central) has a mixed community of both Xhosa-speaking and Afrikaans-speaking people. Voorbrug, The Hague, Roosendal, and Eindhoven are predominantly populated by Afrikaans-speaking coloured people.

== In the news ==
In 2008, Delft was in the news because of the controversial N2 Gateway housing project. The shackdwellers of Joe Slovo Informal Settlement in Cape Town have publicly refused to be forcibly removed to Delft. Also, in December 2008, backyard dwellers occupied over 1,000 N2 Gateway houses in the new Symphony section of Delft. DA Councillor Frank Martin who was accused of inciting thousands of poor people to occupy these houses. Eventually, the families who occupied the houses were violently evicted by police who used rubber bullets to put down the protest. News of the violent repression reached international news with some people saying that it has severely hurt South Africa's reputation. Evicted residents are now living in makeshift shacks on Symphony Way which has widely become known as "Blikkiesdorp" across from the houses. This was believed to have been temporary housing for the evicted dwellers; however, they are still occupying "Blikkiesdorp" for the past eighteen years.

== Land use ==
- Blikkiesdorp
- Symphony Way Pavement Dwellers
