= The Road to South African Freedom =

South African communist manifesto (1962)

- Author: South African Communist Party
- Language: English
- Subject: Anti-apartheid, Communism in South Africa
- Genre: Political manifesto
- Publisher: South African Communist Party
- Publication date: 1962
- Publication place: South Africa
- Media type: Print

The Road to South African Freedom is a political programme adopted by the South African Communist Party (SACP) in 1962. It provided a theoretical and strategic framework for the Party’s involvement in the anti-apartheid movement and became influential in shaping the direction of the broader Congress Alliance and ANC strategies during the struggle for liberation.

The document was released in the wake of increasing state repression following the Sharpeville massacre of 1960 and the banning of key liberation organisations such as the African National Congress (ANC) and Pan Africanist Congress (PAC). It sought to chart a course of resistance that linked the national democratic struggle with socialist transformation.

== Core concepts ==
The key theoretical contribution of the document was the articulation of the concept of Colonialism of a Special Type (CST), which described South Africa as a country where the colonisers - the white minority - lived within the borders and exercised economic and political domination over the black majority.

The SACP argued that national liberation could not be separated from class struggle, and that the end of apartheid must pave the way for a socialist South Africa.

== Strategic goals ==
- End of white minority rule and the institution of universal suffrage.
- Redistribution of land and wealth to the black majority.
- Establishment of a democratic, non-racial South Africa.
- Solidarity with global anti-imperialist movements.
- Two-stage revolution: First, a national democratic revolution; second, a socialist transformation.

== Influence ==
The Road to South African Freedom significantly influenced ANC policy during its underground and exile years. Many of its elements were echoed in the Freedom Charter of 1955 and in later ANC documents such as the Strategy and Tactics of the ANC (1969). Leaders like Joe Slovo, Moses Kotane, Chris Hani, and Oliver Tambo championed these principles during the armed struggle and diplomatic campaigns abroad.

The two-stage theory of revolution remains a core element of SACP and ANC alliance thinking, even in post-apartheid South Africa.

== Legacy ==
After the first democratic elections in 1994, the vision outlined in the document continued to resonate in debates over land reform, economic redistribution, and the role of socialism in modern South Africa. The SACP maintains the document as a historic and ideological milestone in the South African liberation movement.

== See also ==
- South African Communist Party
- Colonialism of a Special Type
- African National Congress
- Freedom Charter
- National Democratic Revolution
- Umkhonto we Sizwe
- Strategy and Tactics of the ANC
- Joe Slovo
- Chris Hani
- Moses Kotane
