= Ray Harmel =

South African journalist and anti-apartheid activist (1915–1974)

- Born: Ruchel “Teibke” Adler; 1 December 1905; Raseiniai, Lithuania
- Died: 11 March 1998 (aged 92); London, England
- Citizenship: South Africa
- Occupation: Anti-apartheid activist
- Spouse: Michael Harmel (m. 1940)
- Children: Barbara Harmel

Ray Harmel (1 December 1905 – 11 March 1998) was a Lithuanian-born South African anti-apartheid activist. She was a member of the South African Communist Party, the Garment Workers' Union of South Africa and the African National Congress.

== Early life and family ==
Harmel was born Ruchel “Teibke” Adler in Raseiniai, a shtetl in Lithuania. Her father, Moise Adler ran a cartage business before going into trade. Her mother, Fagamilla, was the daughter of a Talmud scholar and was herself a strict Orthodox Jew. Ray was one of seven children and the family spoke Yiddish at home. The family lived in poverty and Ray began working to contribute to the household after five years of schooling.

Together with her friends, she formed a Jewish sports club that also hosted talks and lectures with a socialist bent. She was further influenced by her brother, Taffa, who returned from World War I a communist. She later lived in Vilijampolė, where she worked in a factory and then a bakery. She joined the Communist Party of Lithuania and became involved in its activities.

She faced arrest for her activities and decided to flee the country. She eventually boarded a ship in Hamburg that was bound for Cape Town.

Her parents and five of her six siblings were murdered in the Shoah. Only her brother, Sydney, survived.

== South Africa ==
She moved in with relatives that were living in Bertrams in Johannesburg. She took English lessons with the bookstore owner, Fanny Klenerman. She learned tailoring and worked in Sam Jaff's plant for the next decade. Around this time she joined the Garment Workers' Union of South Africa. She sparred with the factory owner and with the GWU general secretary, Solly Sachs, over a tactical stance on racial segregation. Sachs believed that only with racially segregated facilities would white Afrikaner garment workers be persuaded to join the union. Harmel rejected the approach as she was opposed to any form of racial segregation and discrimination. She also attempted to convince prominent Afrikaner women to adopt her stance on the issue.

In the early 1930s, she became a member of the South African Communist Party. Among her tasks were both fundraising and selling the party newspaper, Umsebenzi. She was also Treasurer of the Johannesburg District Committee of the party.

After ten years as a factory worker, Harmel took on a new venture to sell clothes to Africans living in Sophiatown. In the 1950s, Harmel, a seamstress, opened a dress shop on Bree Street in central Johannesburg. She made Winnie Mandela's wedding dress in 1958.

== Exile in London ==
In 1963, Harmel and her political activist husband, Michael Harmel went into exile in London. From there, she worked for the African National Congress' London office.

== Personal life ==
In the 1930s, Harmel was in a relationship with the Latvian-born communist activist, Lazar Bach, with whom she moved in with. Their union was cut short by his ill-fated trip to Moscow. There, he sought arbitration amid growing discord in South African communist politics. He was instead sentenced to hard labour in Russia and died at the age of 35 in 1941.

She married Michael Harmel in 1940, a fellow South African activist, with whom she had a daughter, Barbara. The couple separated in the mid-1960s, whilst living in exile in London. The family lived in Yeoville before building a family home in 1954 in The Gardens, a suburb of Johannesburg. This home became a place of welcome and refuge for key political figures being pursued by the South African police, such as Nelson Mandela, Winnie Mandela, Walter Sisulu, Ahmed Kathrada, Bram Fischer and Sheila Weinberg and her family. A blue plaque now adorns their former home, commemorating the legacy of both Ray and Michael Harmel.

Harmel and her husband were friends with Nelson Mandela and his wife, Winnie. Glamorous photographs of the couple in their wedding attire, including the wedding dress designed and sewn by Ray, were taken at the Harmel home in Johannesburg.

Harmel spent her final years living in Hammerson House, a Jewish nursing home in Hampstead Garden Suburb in London. Cheryl Carolus, South African High Commissioner to the United Kingdom at the time of Harmel's death, commended her as: “one of those women who… laid down the groundwork for future generations of women.”
