= Mark Shope =

South African trade unionist (1919–1998)

Mark Shope SCOB
- Born: 1919; Letaba, Northern Transvaal; Union of South Africa
- Died: 1998 (aged 78–79)
- Known for: General secretary of the South African Congress of Trade Unions
- Other political affiliations: African National Congress; South African Communist Party
- Spouse: Gertrude Shope (m. 1957)
- Children: 6, including Ntombi, Sheila, and Lyndall

Mark Williams Shope SCOB (1919–1998) was a South African trade unionist and anti-apartheid activist. He rose to prominence as the chairman of the African Laundry Workers' Union between 1952 and 1963 and he was the second general secretary of the South African Congress of Trade Unions (SACTU). He was also a member of the National Executive Committee of the African National Congress and an Umkhonto we Sizwe commissar.

== Early life and career ==
Shope was born in 1919 in Letaba, a village near Tzaneen in the former Northern Transvaal. His father, a railway worker, died when he was a toddler. He received no formal schooling until his adulthood, when he obtained a matric certificate through private study. Instead, he and his six siblings spent their childhoods herding cattle, and at age 13 he began work on a nearby citrus plantation. At age 15, he moved to Johannesburg to find work on the gold mines.

After a year in mining, he was involved in his first strike, led by Malawian activist Nelson Banda; after participating in a second strike, he was deported back to the Northern Transvaal, where he remained until 1940. Upon his return to Johannesburg in 1940, at the outset of World War II, he worked first for the South African Railways and Harbours Administration and then for the Johannesburg City Council; he was assigned to the Department of War Supplies until the end of the war.

== Early trade union activism ==
After the end of World War II, Shope began work as a dry cleaner at a steam laundry company, where he first became involved in organised trade unionism. After he participated in a laundry strike in 1946, he was elected as a shop steward in 1947, and in 1952 he was elected as chairman of the African Laundry Workers' Union, a position he held until he left the country in 1963. In 1954, he was also acting chairman of the Transvaal branch of the Council of Non-European Trade Unions while the elected chairman was banned.

Meanwhile, amid escalating opposition to apartheid, Shope joined the African National Congress (ANC) during its Defiance Campaign of 1952, and between 1953 and 1963 he served continuously as chairman of his local ANC branch in two successive areas of Johannesburg – one of which was the highly active branch in Jabavu, Soweto. When the ANC-aligned South African Congress of Trade Unions (SACTU) was formed in 1955, Shope was a member of its inaugural national executive committee; he later served as its national treasurer and then, until 1963, as its general secretary. Shope was a defendant in the 1956 Treason Trial, and, separately, he was detained without trial for five months during the 1960 state of emergency. After his release he was elected to the political committee charged with preparations for the All-African People's Conference, held in Pietermaritzburg in March 1961; however, by the time the conference was held, Shope had been arrested again and this time sentenced to one year's imprisonment. He was discharged on appeal.

== Activism in exile ==
Banned in 1963, Shope went into exile that year, delegated by the ANC to replace Moses Mabhida as SACTU's representative at the World Federation of Trade Unions headquarters in Prague. He remained in exile for the next three decades. He was among the first ANC members to receive military training in the Soviet Union under the auspices of the party's new armed wing, Umkhonto we Sizwe (MK), and he served on the ANC's unelected National Executive Committee in exile during this period.

In 1969, during the ANC's Morogoro Conference, SACTU formalised its organisational presence in exile, setting up provisional headquarters in Lusaka, Zambia; Shope was reappointed as SACTU general secretary, a position he held until 1975. In this capacity he was a founding member of the Southern African Trade Union Coordinating Council and the Organisation of African Trade Union Unity. In 1975, John Gaetsewe replaced him as secretary-general; thereafter he remained a member of SACTU, and continued to play a leadership role in its political education programmes, but he also redoubled his activities with the ANC, which sent him to Angola.

He became a commissar at the MK camp at Nova Katenga (also spelled Novo Catengue), which over the next five years received a flood of new MK recruits in the aftermath of the 1976 Soweto uprising. He and Jack Simons became famous inside MK for the political education lessons they delivered at the camp to the so-called June 16 Detachment; which ranged over historical materialism, South African political history, and the philosophy of non-racialism. According to Stanley Manong and James Ngculu, who lived at the camp during this period, Shope's slogan was, "a soldier without politics is a mercenary."

Shope also represented the ANC as its chief representative in Nigeria for a period. In 1987, a group of Security Branch officers attempted to assassinate him, Lambert Moloi, and two other MK members while they were visiting Gaborone, Botswana; in 1999 the officers testified about the plot at the Truth and Reconciliation Commission and were granted full amnesty.

== Retirement in South Africa ==
Shope returned to South Africa during the negotiations to end apartheid and was named as honorary president of the Post and Telecommunication Workers' Association. He died in 1998.

== Honours ==
In August 2002, the post-apartheid ANC government of Tzaneen Local Municipality announced that the town would be renamed Mark Shope in Shope's honor. The renaming encountered strident resistance from the opposition Democratic Alliance and some members of the local community, and the National Geographical Names Council ultimately rejected the renaming, finding that it was not necessary because the name Tzaneen carried no racist political connotation. Observers linked the local opposition to tribalistic rejection of Shope's Tsonga name by Sotho residents.

On 10 December 2002, South African president Thabo Mbeki admitted Shope posthumously to the Order of the Baobab, Gold. He received the award for his "exceptional contribution to the struggle against apartheid and the development of the labour movement."

== Personal life ==
Shope had three children from his first marriage: George, who died while a student, and politicians Ntombi and Sheila. In 1957, during the Treason Trial, he married his second wife, Gertrude Shope, with whom he had three more children: politician Lyndall and diplomats Lenin and Thaninga. His family joined him in exile in 1966.
