= Strategy and Tactics of the ANC =

1969 policy document of South Africa's ANC

Strategy and Tactics of the African National Congress (ANC)
- Created: 1969
- Date effective: 1 May 1969
- Amended: 2007; 2012
- Location: Morogoro, Tanzania
- Authors: Joe Slovo; African National Congress
- Subject: Dismantling apartheid, establishing democratic society.
- Purpose: Political manifesto

Strategy and Tactics of the ANC is a foundational policy document of the African National Congress (ANC), first adopted at the organisation's 1st National Consultative Conference in Tanzania in 1969. It provides an ideological framework and strategic guide for achieving the ANC's objective of a National Democratic Revolution (NDR).

In the wake of the ANC's banning in 1960, its leadership in exile convened a consultative conference in Morogoro, where Strategy and Tactics was adopted to chart a unified path for the liberation movement. The document was particularly aimed at reconciling the political and military strategies of the ANC and its armed wing, Umkhonto we Sizwe (MK), formed in 1961.

== Core concepts ==
=== National Democratic Revolution (NDR) ===
The document defines the NDR as a process to dismantle the apartheid state and replace it with a democratic society based on equality and justice, where the African majority would play a leading role in political and economic life.

=== Colonialism of a Special Type ===
Strategy and Tactics introduced the concept of "Colonialism of a Special Type", describing apartheid as a system in which both the coloniser and the colonised lived within the same borders, creating a unique dynamic of internal colonial oppression.

=== Alliance Strategy ===
The ANC emphasised the importance of maintaining a broad liberation alliance, particularly with the South African Communist Party (SACP) and Congress of South African Trade Unions (COSATU), forming what later became known as the Tripartite Alliance.

=== Armed Struggle and Mass Mobilisation ===
Although the document justified the armed struggle through MK, it also stressed the primacy of political leadership and the need for mass mobilisation, underground work, and international solidarity to complement the military effort.

== Revisions ==
Since 1969, the ANC has revised Strategy and Tactics at multiple National Conferences.

- 1997 Mafikeng Conference: Reoriented the strategy for democratic transformation in the new post-apartheid state.
- 2007 Polokwane Conference: Focused on political renewal, anti-corruption, and deeper economic transformation.
- 2012 Mangaung Conference: Reaffirmed the relevance of the NDR and called for decisive state intervention in the economy.
- 2017 Nasrec Conference: Addressed state capture, inequality, and internal divisions.
- 2022 Draft Revision: Called for organisational unity and confronting global and domestic challenges.

Strategy and Tactics continues to be the ideological backbone of ANC policy, political education, and state governance. It directly informs the party's major policy instruments like Black Economic Empowerment, affirmative action, and state-led development.

== Criticism ==
Some critics argue that the ANC has deviated from its revolutionary path, citing neoliberal economic policies and elite enrichment as contradictions to the principles outlined in Strategy and Tactics.

== See also ==
- African National Congress
- National Democratic Revolution
- Tripartite Alliance
- Freedom Charter
- Umkhonto we Sizwe
- Colonialism of a Special Type
- Congress of the People (1955)
