= Conference of the Left =

Proposed political gathering of left-wing organisations in South Africa

The Conference of the Left was a political gathering of organisations claiming to be left-wing along with nationalist organisations in South Africa. The initiative was initially floated by Irvin Jim and then promoted primarily by the South African Communist Party (SACP) and was preceded by discussions with the Economic Freedom Fighters (EFF), and other organisations. It took place from May 29 to May 31, 2026.

It brought together the SACP, the EFF, the uMkhonto we Sizwe Party, the Congress of South African Trade Unions as well as a group of small Marxist and pan-Africanist formations including the Pan Africanist Congress of Azania, the Azanian People’s Organization, the Socialist Party of Azania and the Independent Labour Party.

Its stated aimed was to build a cooperation among organisations that share anti-capitalist and transformative economic objectives.

== Criticisms ==
The conference was strongly criticised by Abahlali baseMjondolo, the South African Federation of Trade Unions and others for including xenophobic and corrupt organisations and figures allied with the 'radical economic transformation' faction of the ANC. It was described as having caused 'a large and raw rupture within the left'.

It was also criticised for failing to disclose its source of funding.

== Background ==
The SACP had long been one of the three organisations forming part of the Tripartite Alliance alongside the African National Congress (ANC) and the Congress of South African Trade Unions (COSATU) since 1990 following the release of Nelson Mandela from prison. The ANC holds a plurality in the South African parliament, while the SACP and COSATU have not contested any democratic election in South Africa, however the SACP has resolved to contest the 2026 local government elections, a decision seen as challenging the ANC.

Earlier, following the establishment of democratic rule in 1994, relations within the Tripartite Alliance were periodically strained by ideological disagreements. After 1994, the SACP criticised the ANC government's adoption of the Growth, Employment and Redistribution (GEAR) policy framework, which it said was a "class project" and favoured market-based economic policies spearheaded by then Deputy President Thabo Mbeki.

During the mid-2000s leadership contest in the ANC, the SACP and several trade union leaders aligned with the Congress of South African Trade Unions supported Jacob Zuma's successful challenge against Mbeki at the 52nd National Conference of the African National Congress in 2007.

In subsequent years, however, the SACP became increasingly critical of Zuma's administration, particularly in relation to allegations of state capture involving the Gupta family. The party described the relationship between the Gupta business network and elements within the state under Zuma as "corporate state capture".

Ahead of the 54th National Conference of the African National Congress in 2017, the SACP publicly backed Cyril Ramaphosa for the ANC presidency rather than the candidate supported by Zuma, Nkosazana Dlamini-Zuma.

The party had earlier resolved at its 14th National Congress in 2017 to explore the possibility of contesting elections independently of the ANC, citing concerns about corruption and what it described as the growing influence of capitalist interests within the governing party and the slow pace of the National Democratic Revolution.

Following the 2024 South African general election, the SACP also criticised the ANC leadership under Ramaphosa and secretary-general Fikile Mbalula for forming a Government of National Unity (GNU) with the liberal Democratic Alliance (DA). SACP leader Solly Mapaila argued that the ANC was supposed to form the GNU with the leftist Economic Freedom Fighters (EFF) and centrist uMkhonto weSizwe Party (MKP), not the DA.

Against this background of evolving relations within the Tripartite Alliance, discussions emerged in 2026 about convening a Conference of the Left to explore cooperation among left-wing political parties, trade unions and social movements ahead of the 2026 South African municipal elections.

In March 2026, the ANC confirmed that its top national officials would discuss an invitation from the SACP to attend the proposed Conference of the Left, after COSATU was also invited. The ANC eventually decided not to attend, due to not believing that the conference "represents the real left of our country".
