= African Laundry Workers' Union =

Trade union in South Africa

The African Laundry Workers' Union was a trade union representing cleaning workers in South Africa.

The union was founded in 1927, on the initiative of the South African Communist Party (SACP), and it was a founding affiliate of the Federation of Non-European Trade Unions. While it was initially one of many new industrial unions to organise black workers, it was almost unique in surviving the Great Depression.

The union was initially led by T. W. Thibedi. He was expelled from the SACP in 1930, and the union was thereafter associated with the Trotskyist movement. Thibedi was succeeded as general secretary by Murray Gow Purdy, who led the union into a strike for improved pay and conditions. The union was unable to fund strike pay, but Purdy affiliated the union to the South African Trades and Labour Council (SAT&LC) on the day the strike started, and was thus able to draw on its funds, against the wishes of the SAT&LC leadership.

Although the strike achieved some success, many union members were victimised, and Purdy stood down, being succeeded by Ralph Lee. He increased membership to just over 300, but came to believe that little more could be achieved. He left South Africa in 1935, and was replaced by Max Gordon, who attempted to use the union as a springboard to organising other groups of workers.

In 1941, the union was a founding affiliate of the Council of Non-European Trade Unions, and from 1943, it was led by Raymond Mhlaba.
