= Albert Nzula =

South African politician and activist

Secretary-General of the South African Communist Party
- In office 1929–1931
- Preceded by: Douglas Wolton
- Succeeded by: J. B. Marks

Personal details
- Born: 1905 Orange River Colony
- Died: January 17, 1934 (aged 28–29) Moscow, Soviet Union
- Party: South African Communist Party

Albert Nzula (1905 – 17 January 1934) was a South African politician and activist. Nzula was the first black secretary general of the Communist Party of South Africa. His home town, Rouxville, honoured him by opening a library named after him.

== Early life ==
Nzula was born in Rouxville in the Orange River Colony (currently known as Free State province) in 1905. He was born of an ethnic Nguni background but his family was brought up in a Sotho culture. He was a student at the Bensonvale Institution in Herschel before completing his education at Lovedale, where he qualified as a teacher. After graduation he moved to Aliwal North, where his political career resumed.

== Political career ==
He became secretary of a local branch of the Industrial and Commercial Workers' Union (ICU) in Aliwal North. He moved to Evaton and taught at Wilberfoce. During his stay there, he joined the Communist Party of South Africa (CPSA), now known as the South African Communist Party (SACP) in August 1928. Due to Douglas Wolton's and others such as Sidney Bunting (lawyer, labour leader and founding member and leader of the Communist Party of South Africa (CPSA) in 1921) and Edward Roux's (founder member of the Young Communist League, member of the CPSA, editor of Umsebenzi, the Communist Party weekly, later a member of the Liberal Party) Africanisation of the Communist Party of South African by recruiting Black leaders from the workplace, Nzula rose through the ranks and became Secretary-General by 1929. Nzula was so impressed with Wolton that he travelled to Johannesburg to pick up books and literature at the party's headquarters. He would later be reprimanded for reading such works after being reported to an Afrikaner school inspector. The same inspector would fail his pupils during an examination, a situation that Nzula soon appealed and they reset their exams. He later resigned and joined the Communist Party as a full-time worker. At the CPSA’s party conference in 1929, Nzula was elected assistant secretary. He soon took over as acting editor of the party paper “The South African Worker”.

He was described by Edwin Thabo Mofutsanyana (also served as the general-secretary of the CPSA), as an excellent propagandist and agitator during public speaking. Walton and Nzula would clash when it came to the discussion of a "Native Republic".

In 1929, Nzula became joint secretary with Edward Roux of the African Rights (a short lived communist initiated organisation aimed in part at eclipsing the more conservative African National Congress). Nzula was also a member of the ANC and he supported Josiah Tshangana Gumede to make the organisation more radical in their approach against discriminatory laws. In 1930, he was shifted from CPSA Secretary to run the Federation of Non-European Trade Unions (formed due to the fact that black workers were excluded from joining other unions in South Africa). That year (1930), Nzula was the chairman at the All-in-conference held at the Trades Hall in Johannesburg to launch a campaign to fight repressive legislations introduced in parliament by the then Justice Minister Oswald Pirow. He also attended the International Conference of Negro Workers’ in July 1930 where he represented South Africa. This conference was held in Hamburg, Germany. This Conference called for complete independence for all colonies and the recognition of the right of self-determination for all nations. Nzula organised a mass meeting for unemployed Africans and he led them on a massive demonstration on 1 May 1931, which merged into one huge procession with white workers. At the anti-pass conference held at the Inchcape Hall in Johannesburg, Nzula was once again the chairman. This conference resolved to work towards a mass burning of passes. This led to a demonstration by thousands on 16 December 1933 where passes were burned.

== Nzula in the Soviet Union ==
Wolton nominated Nzula and Moses Kotane, due to their grasp of Marxism and leadership potential, to travel to the Soviet Union for further schooling and education. He was smuggled out of South Africa as a member of a singing group off to London to make records. There he was assisted by the British Communist Party to reach Moscow. He remained in Moscow to work for the Communist International as a writer on the organ The Negro Worker. While in Moscow, he was employed doing research at the Profintern Trade Union headquarters with Soviet scholars II Potekhin and AZ Zusmanovich, collaborating on a book called Forced Labour concerning African labour conditions. His pen name was Tom Jackson. He was also involved in translation work for Zulu Tales from Zulu for the author Igor Snegirev which would be published in 1937. He is described by the SACP as:

strong and fearless, his influence grew rapidly… He was emphatic that the leadership of the party must pass primarily into the hands of Africans.

— SACP.

== Death ==
According to Edwin Thabo Mofutsanyana, Nazula drank excessively and expressed anti-Stalinist and Trotskyist views while intoxicated. He was brought before officials of the International Committee of the Comintern for disciplinary measures. He was prevented from returning to South Africa in order to prevent the spread of Trotskyist ideas in the SACP. Instead, it was decided he should move to the United States. Nzula accepted this plan but died before it could be put into effect.

According to this story, he died on 17 January 1934 as a result of inflammation of lungs – lobar pneumonia – which he contracted having overdosed on alcohol and fallen asleep outdoor in sub-zero temperatures. He was cremated and his funeral held in Moscow.

Paul Trewhela gives an alternative account of Nzula's death. According to Trewhela, Jomo Kenyatta, who had been studying in Moscow at the time, told CLR James that Nzula had been arrested as a Trotskyist. Charlie van Gelderen repeated this story, claiming that he heard it directly from George Padmore while in London in 1935.

A hospital has been named in his honour in Trompsburg, which was opened on 15 June 2017.

== Books by Albert Nzula ==
- A.T. Nzula, I.I. Potekhin and A.Z. Zusmanovich, Forced Labour in Colonial Africa, edited Robin Cohen, translated by Hugh Jenkins (London, 1979)

== See also ==
- Federation of Non-European Trade Unions
- Communist Party of South Africa
- Industrial and Commercial Workers' Union
- The Negro Worker

Party political offices
Preceded by Douglas Wolton	General Secretary of the South African Communist Party; 1929–1931	Succeeded by J. B. Marks
