= Edwin Thabo Mofutsanyana =

South African teacher, miner and journalist (1899-1995)

Secretary-General of the South African Communist Party
- In office 1936–1938
- Preceded by: Moses Kotane
- Succeeded by: Moses Kotane

Personal details
- Born: 1899 Orange Free State
- Died: 1995 (aged 95–96) Phuthaditjhaba
- Party: South African Communist Party; African National Congress
- Spouse: Josie Palmer

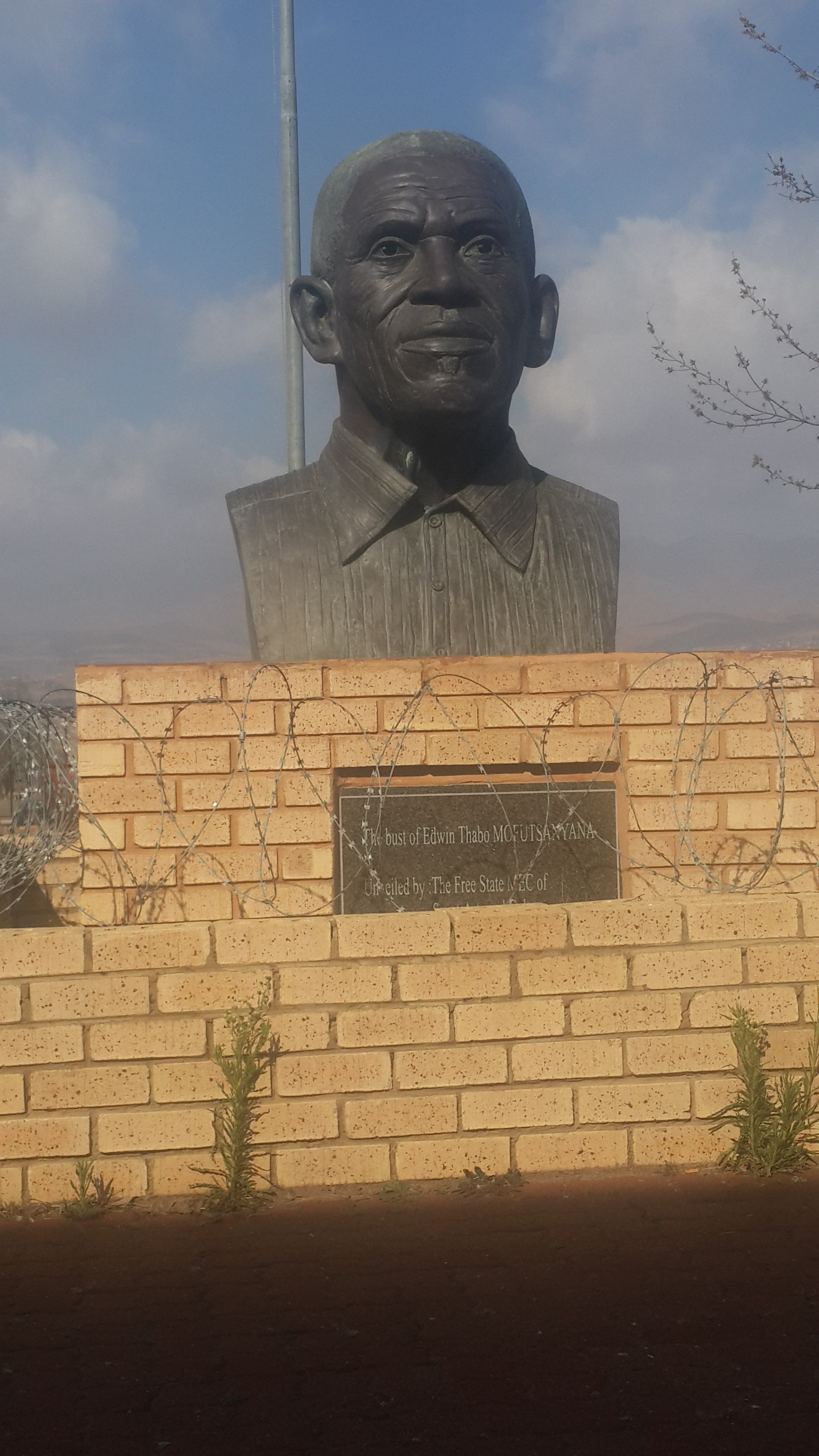
Bust of Thabo Mofutsanyana at the Thabo Mofutsanyana District Municipality offices in Phuthaditjhaba

Edwin Thabo Mofutsanyana (1899 – 1995) was born in the Witsieshoek area in the Free State. He was a teacher, miner and journalist. Mofutsanyana became an active member of the Communist Party of South Africa and the African National Congress. He studied in the Lenin School in Moscow in the 1930s where he strengthened his political knowledge. A district municipality in the eastern Free State of South Africa is named in his honour.

== Early life ==
Thabo Edwin Mofutsanyana was born in 1899 at Witsieshoek in the eastern Free State. He completed his primary schooling in Witsieshoek. At the time, schools only went up to Grade six when learners reached around the age of twelve or thirteen. Mofutsanyana's first job was in a factory

Mofutsanyana's father was a sharecropper. During the South African War, he was arrested by the British as they believed that he was involved on the side of the Boers. he was sent to a prison camp in Pietermaritzburg and later to a prison on St Helena Island – off the west coast of Africa. He was kept there until the end of the war in 1902.

At the age of 17, Mofutsanyana went to find employment in Johannesburg in order to pay for his education. His first job was as a guard in a factory that made gold bars. His employer, Mr Bush, befriended him and took Mofutsanyana with him when he moved to Cape Town. The stay, however, was short-lived as Bush committed suicide.

== Political career ==
Mofutsanyana joined the South African Native National Congress in 1921 and subsequently left his job as a miner to take up full-time employment at the organisation. Mofutsanyana had been motivated to join the SANNC after an incident involving his friend, Jacob Majoro. Majoro and two other men tried to board a train soon after it took off but accidentally pulled the conductor from the carriage in their attempt to board. Majoro was charged for this incident and Mofutsanyana was angered as it appeared to be a racially charged punishment.

Mofutsanyana joined the Communist Party of South Africa (CPSA) in 1929 after listening to a speech by Jimmy Shields (journalist) who was a young communist from Scotland. Shields had called for the working class, particularly Black South Africans, to fight for their rights to rule. Shortly thereafter, on 16 December 1929, Mofutsanyana organised a protest march in Potchefstroom against the pass laws. The protest was invaded by white protesters who threatened Mofutsanyana at gun point.

Mofutsanyana later attended at a night school run by the CPSA. In one of his speeches there, Mofutsanyana was quoted as saying "To fight your enemy, you must know his language".

In 1932, the CPSA held a meeting in Martindale in Johannesburg where Mofutsanyana addressed workers. He told them that they should refuse to pay taxes if their employers refused to provide food, clothing and clean water. Mofutsanyana had become the secretary-general of the African Federation of Trade Unions (AFTU) which was uniting various unions at the time and encouraged workers to form a special group and join the AFTU. A week later, Mofutsanyana led a march of unemployed workers to the Johannesburg offices of George Ballended, who was in charge of the Township (South Africa) where Black people were housed, to demand better living conditions.

== Marriage ==
Mofutsanyana married Josie Palmer in 1930 who also worked for the CPSA. They lived in relative poverty in a room in the backyard of Palmer's grandmother's house. Palmer earned extra money by doing laundry for White families. In 1954, she helped found the Federation of South African Women (FEDSAW) together with Lillian Ngoyi, Helen Joseph, Rahima Moosa and many others.

== Mofutsanyana in Moscow ==
In the 1930s, Black South Africans were flown to Moscow for a period of two years to learn about communism and ways to fight capitalism. The first three leaders were Mofutsanyana, Albert Nzula and Gana Makabeni. Mofutsanyana left South Africa midway through 1932 over the Mozambican border. He spent a few weeks in the part of Lourenço Marques, now known as Maputo. He then boarded a ship to Italy where he was almost discovered by a British Consul who had been alerted by the South African government to a Black communist on board. He managed to talk his way out of the altercation as the officials had no proof that he was the Black man they were looking for.

In 1933, Mofutsanyana enrolled at the International Lenin School and was placed in the Negro section together with other Black students from other countries. Their studies covered the skills to organise a trade union, military science and communism. He returned to South Africa in 1934 after completing his studies.

== Back in South Africa ==
In December 1935, Mofutsanyana attended the All African Convention (an organised body that intended to promote African rights through boycotts) where he was elected to its executive.

In 1937, Mofutsanyana joined J. B. Marks and others in an attempt to revive the African National Congress. Under Alfred Bitini Xuma, Mofutsanyana served on the ANC National Executive Committee as an advisor on labour related matters.

In 1937, 1942 and 1948, Mofutsanyana ran as a communist candidate for election to the Natives Representative Council but never won an election.

In 1943, Mofutsanyana and Radebe organised a conference at which the African Mineworkers Union (AMWU) was formed with J. B. Marks becoming its first president. The organisation was founded due to difficulties experienced by Black workers who had hitherto been working with White unions. These Black leaders wanted to form their own organisation run by Blacks.

When the CPSA was banned in 1950, Mofutsanyana had been serving on its executive committee and was also on the forefront when the South African Communist Party was established.

== Exile ==
In 1959, Mofutsanyana decided to escape persecution from South African government and take refuge in Lesotho. He earned an income by typing up letters from Lesotho miners who were looking for work in South Africa. He remained in exile for 30 years.

== Death ==
Mofutsanyana died in his home town of Phuthaditjhaba in 1995. He was able to vote for the new democratic South Africa in April 1994. Govan Mbeki declared that he named his son Thabo Mbeki after Mofutsanyana as they were very close friends.

Thabo Mofutsanyana District Municipality is named in his honour.

== See also ==
- Federation of Non-European Trade Unions
- Communist Party of South Africa
- Industrial and Commercial Workers' Union
- South African Communist Party

Party political offices
Preceded by Moses Kotane	General Secretary of the South African Communist Party; 1936–1938	Succeeded by Moses Kotane
