= Josie Mpama =

South African anti-apartheid and labor activist

- Born: 21 March 1903; Potchefstroom
- Died: 3 December 1979 (aged 76)
- Parent(s): Stephen Bonny Mpama and Georgina Garson

Josie Mpama (21 March 1903 – 3 December 1979), born Josephine Palmer, was a South African anti-apartheid and labor activist.

A forceful campaigner against racial segregation and for labor and women's rights, she is considered the first black woman to play a major role in the Communist Party of South Africa.

== Early life ==
Josephine Palmer was born in 1903 in Potchefstroom in what was then known as the Transvaal Colony, now the North West Province of South Africa.

Her parents were Georgina Garson and Stephen Bonny Mpama, a government interpreter. She described herself as coloured; her father was Zulu, though his family had left their community and converted to Christianity, and her mother was Mfengu, Afrikaner, and moSotho.

She was known for a portion of her life as Josie Palmer, using the Anglicized version of her father's Zulu last name. She began using the name Mpama later, on moving to a black township, but used both names throughout her life, depending in part on where she was living.

Mpama was raised in Sophiatown, outside Johannesburg, before moving back to Potchefstroom in 1921. Her parents divorced when she was seven, and she eventually had to provide for herself and her mother by working as a servant for white families.

== Activism ==
In the late 1920s, Mpama became one of the first black women to join the Communist Party of South Africa, a predecessor of the South African Communist Party. Shortly after joining, she became the Communist Party's branch secretary for Potchefstroom.

In 1928, she led a campaign against requiring black residents of the Potchefstroom area to obtain lodger's permits for anyone staying in their homes, including their own adult children. She went on to campaign against several other apartheid residency and travel restrictions. Mpama was also involved in the 1929 Beer Hall Riots.

In the early years of her political work, she did laundry for white families to make ends meet.

She and her husband were forced to leave Potchefstroom in 1931, and they moved to Johannesburg. She joined the Communist Party's Political Bureau in 1937 and then its Central Committee. She also became a member of the party's Johannesburg committee in the 1940s and was a leader in the women's section of the party.

Mpama wrote for Umsebenzi, the official press organ of the Communist Party, in the 1920s and '30s, highlighting the struggles of black workers. She was militantly pro-trade union and fought for increased wages for teachers.

In 1935, she traveled to Moscow to attend the Seventh World Congress of the Communist International and study at the Communist University of the Toilers of the East.

Mpama's work also included the fight for women's rights. In 1947, she helped found the Transvaal All Women’s Union, becoming the organization's first secretary. She then helped found the Federation of South African Women in 1954, eventually leading its Transvaal branch.

== Later years ==
Mpama faced pressure from the authorities, including a banning order in the mid-1950s and an arrest in 1960. She was eventually forced to step back from political activity due to the banning order and health problems. She spent her final years organizing women's groups at her church.

Mpama died on 3 December 1979, after having been hit by a car while waiting to collect her pension.

== Personal life ==
Mpama was common-law married to Thabo Edwin Mofutsanyana, a leader in the African National Congress and the Communist Party of South Africa, in the 1920s. Because Mofutsanyana was classified as African under apartheid laws while Mpama was classified as coloured, legally their partnership violated apartheid laws. The couple separated in the late 1930s.

She had her first daughter, Carol, with a coloured man in Doornfontein in 1920. She then had her second daughter, Francis, with another man in 1926.

With Mofutsanyana, she had another daughter, Hilda, in 1928. She later had a son, Dennis, possibly the product of an affair with Moses Kotane.

Mpama was a practicing Anglican, and she was vocal in her belief that there was no contradiction between her Christian faith and her commitment to communism.

== Recognition ==
In 2004, she posthumously received the Order of Luthuli in Silver for her activism against apartheid and in favour of workers' rights.

She is represented with a sculpture at the National Heritage Monument in the Groenkloof Nature Reserve.
