= The Gardens, Johannesburg =

The Gardens
- Location within Gauteng Location within South Africa
- Coordinates: 26.147°S 28.076°E
- Country: South Africa
- Province: Gauteng
- Municipality: City of Johannesburg
- Main Place: Johannesburg
- Established: 1902

Area
  - Total: 0.44 km^{2} (0.17 sq mi)

Population (2011)
  - Total: 1,262
  - Density: 2,900/km^{2} (7,400/sq mi)

Racial makeup (2011)
  - Black African: 21.1%
  - Coloured: 2.1%
  - Indian/Asian: 4.8%
  - White: 66.4%
  - Other: 5.6%

First languages (2011)
  - English: 79.0%
  - Afrikaans: 5.6%
  - Zulu: 4.5%
  - Tswana: 2.0%
  - Other: 8.9%
- Time zone: UTC+2 (SAST)
- PO box: 4019

The Gardens is a suburb of Johannesburg, South Africa. A small northern suburb that is surrounded by Highlands North, Orchards, and Oaklands, it is located in Region E of the City of Johannesburg Metropolitan Municipality.

== History ==
The suburb was developed in 1902. In 1954, the political activist couple Michael Harmel and Ray Harmel, built a house in the suburb.Their home became a place of welcome and refuge for key political figures being pursued by the South African police, such as Nelson Mandela, Winnie Mandela, Walter Sisulu, Ahmed Kathrada, Bram Fischer and Sheila Weinberg and her family. A blue plaque adorns the exterior wall of the house, marking the significance of the previous occupants.
