= Sheila Sithole =

South African politician (born 1948)

Member of the National Assembly
- In office 6 May 2009 – 7 May 2019

Personal details
- Born: 4 February 1948 (age 78)
- Citizenship: South Africa
- Party: African National Congress
- Relations: George Shope (brother); Ntombi Shope (sister); Lyndall Shope-Mafole (half-sister); Lenin Shope (half-brother); Thaninga Shope-Linney (half-sister)
- Parent: Mark Shope (father)

Sheila Coleen Nkhensani Sithole (née Shope; born 4 February 1948) is a South African politician who represented the African National Congress (ANC) in the National Assembly from 2009 to 2019. Before that, she was a Member of the Limpopo Provincial Legislature. She is also a former chairperson of the ANC Women's League in Bushbuckridge.

== Early life ==
Sithole was born on 4 February 1948. Her father was Mark Shope, a trade unionist and Treason Triallist who went into exile abroad after the ANC was banned in 1960; her younger sister, Ntombi Shope, also became a politician. She was influenced in her adolescence by Ruth First and Sheila Weinberg; according to Sithole, her father introduced her to First, who proclaimed her "a blue stocking" and arranged weekly maths lessons for her with Weinberg.

== Political career ==
In South Africa's first post-apartheid elections in 1994, Sithole was appointed as chairperson of the Commission on Women in the office of the Premier of Limpopo (then called the Northern Province), Ngoako Ramatlhodi. She also represented the ANC in the Limpopo Provincial Legislature and was chairperson of the ANC Women's League branch in Bushbuckridge. The latter position led her into conflict with Mathews Phosa, then the Premier of Mpumalanga, because her Women's League branch was affiliated with Limpopo, contrary to Phosa's campaign to incorporate Bushbuckridge into Mpumalanga. In a dramatic encounter in August 1994, Phosa arrived in Bushbuckridge in a helicopter to rescue Ramatlhodi and Sithole from protestors who had surrounded them; Sithole's supporters later alleged that Phosa's camp had staged the demonstration and pre-arranged the rescue. In April 1995, Phosa allegedly referred to Sithole and two other ANC members as "mapanyulas" (a Tsonga profanity meaning "animal arsehole") at a rally, and Sithole announced that she would sue him for defamation, seeking R300,000 in damages.

Sithole was not re-elected to the provincial legislature in 1999 but returned for another term after the 2004 general election. Thereafter she served two consecutive terms in the National Assembly, gaining election in 2009 and 2014.
