= Growth, Employment and Redistribution =

South African macroeconomic policy strategy adopted in 1996

Growth, Employment and Redistribution (commonly abbreviated as GEAR) was a macroeconomic policy adopted by the Government of South Africa in June 1996 under the African National Congress‑led administration.

It followed the adoption of the Reconstruction and Development Programme (RDP), and aimed to promote rapid economic growth, increase employment and achieve a more equitable redistribution of income and opportunities following the end of apartheid in 1994.

== Background and outcomes ==
In the early 1990s, South Africa faced serious economic challenges including high unemployment, low investment, poverty and inequality as the apartheid regime ended. The RDP set out social development goals, but policymakers argued it lacked a coherent macroeconomic framework to foster sustainable growth and led to the introduction of GEAR to provide that framework.

Its core objectives included the enhancement of the growth of South Africa's gross domestic product through fiscal discipline, macroeconomic stability, export expansion and investment promotion in order to create jobs, expand economic opportunities and improve national income distribution.

GEAR set ambitious targets, including achieving a sustained economic growth rate of around 6% per year and creating up to 400 000 new jobs annually by the year 2000.

The policy was a market‑oriented economic reform seeking solution. It emphasised fiscal discipline, reduction of budget deficits, control of inflation, trade liberalisation, privatisation of state assets and liberalisation of capital flows to attract both domestic and foreign investment

Although GEAR was able to reduce inflation and improve fiscal balance, its employment and redistribution outcomes were widely debated.

Many of the strategy's employment targets were not met and unemployment remained high throughout the late 1990s. Official projections of rapid job creation fell short, and critics argued that the strategy’s emphasis on market reform and fiscal restraint constrained public spending on social services.

== Criticism ==
GEAR was criticised by labour organisations, some academics and social movements for its market-oriented approach, which many argued prioritized fiscal restraint over social welfare.

The South African Communist Party (SACP), a key ally in the Tripartite Alliance, and the Congress of South African Trade Unions (COSATU) were particularly vocal and described GEAR as a "class project" that entrenched capitalist interests and constrained the government's ability to implement the National Democratic Revolution (NDR) effectively.

However, Mbeki defended his government's decision to implement GEAR and stated that the programme remained the appropriate policy response to South Africa's economic challenges inherited from the sanctioned Apartheid South Africa. While acknowledging criticisms, Mbeki stated that GEAR had stabilised the South African economy, improved fiscal discipline and contributed to the improvement of lives for many South Africans. He also indicated that additional social measures would be implemented, such as expanding the child support grant, making unemployment insurance available to vulnerable workers and coupling infrastructure investment with public works programmes.

Writing in the ANC Today February 2002, Mbeki said that GEAR was in line with earlier ANC policy documents like the Ready to Govern and the RDP, both of which talked about maintenance of macroeconomic balance and budget deficits reduction, rejecting criticism that GEAR represented a shift to neoliberal approach.
