= Michael Harmel =

South African journalist and anti-apartheid activist (1915–1974)

- Born: Michael Alan Harmel; 7 February 1915; Johannesburg, South Africa
- Died: 18 June 1974 (aged 59); Prague, Czechoslovakia
- Citizenship: South Africa; Ireland
- Occupation: Anti-apartheid activist
- Spouse: Ray Harmel (m. 1940)
- Children: Barbara Harmel

Michael Alan Harmel OLG (7 February 1915 – 18 June 1974) was a South African anti-apartheid activist, journalist and editor. He was a political mentor and friend of Nelson Mandela. Harmel was a member of the Central Committee of the South African Communist Party and its leading theoretician. He was honoured posthumously with the Order of Luthuli in 2013.

== Early life ==
Harmel was born in Doornfontein in Johannesburg to Irish Jewish immigrant parents. His paternal grandfather, Michael Harmel came from the shtetl of Pikeliai in the Russian Empire (modern day Lithuania). He married Michael's grandmother, Hannah Deborah (Dora), from Leckava and with whom he had seven children and one adoptive daughter. The couple emigrated to Ireland in the early 1870s. One of the daughters, Michael's aunt, Molly Harmel, was also the mother of Michael's cousin, the Irish writer, Michael Sayers.

Michael's Irish-born father, Arthur Aaron Harmel trained as a pharmacist in Dublin and emigrated to South Africa in 1910. In Bulawayo in Southern Rhodesia, he married Sarah Landau, also from the Irish Jewish community and born to Polish Jewish parents. Michael's mother, Sarah, died of Spanish flu when he was three years-old. Michael was then raised by his father and aunt in the Orange Free State town of Vrede. Michael later moved to East London with his father. Michael attended the primary school of Selborne College in 1923. The family then relocated to Port Elizabeth and Michael began attending Grey High School in 1924, matriculating in 1932. In this period, Michael also had his Bar Mitzvah at Port Elizabeth Hebrew Congregation.

He enrolled for a BA in English literature and Economics at Rhodes University in Grahamstown. He wrote poetry and literary reviews for The Rhodian, a bi-annual publication of submissions by Rhodes students. He also founded and edited the short-lived publication, The Adelphi, billed as "A South African Monthly Review of Literature, Public Affairs and The Arts".

== Activism and career ==
In 1938, Harmel returned to work at the Johannesburg newspaper, The Star, where he had worked in the winter vacation of the previous year.

He later left the country, relocating to London for fifteen months, where he joined the British Communist Party and was employed by their newspaper, the Daily Worker. In this period, he embraced the ideology of Leninism.

Upon his return to Johannesburg, he was elected secretary of the South African Communist Party's local District Committee in 1940. He also joined the editorial board of Inkululeko, the communications organ of the party.

In 1952, he was banned under the Suppression of Communism Act, 1950 which he defied, resulting in subsequent arrests and renewed banning orders. In the same year, the South African Jewish Board of Deputies distanced itself from an allegation in a police report that the Board controlled the South African Communist Party. The police report had quoted Harmel as its source.

He then became involved with establishing the radical left-wing white, anti-apartheid organization, South African Congress of Democrats, which formed part of the Congress Alliance. In this, he was joined by Ruth First, Joe Slovo, and Bram Fischer, among others. In 1955 he served a one-year term as principal of Central Indian High School in the Transvaal. The school was formed by the Transvaal Indian Congress in response to the government's closure of the Fordsburg Indian High School. The new school was pioneering for having a multi-racial teaching staff.

In 1959, he took on the role of editor of the publication, The African Communist. He continued in the role until the early 1970s. In addition, he was published by The Guardian in England as a correspondent.

In 1962, he revived The Adelphi, publishing work by himself, Jean-Paul Sartre, Yevgeny Yevtushenko, John Pepper Clark, Christopher Okigbo, Jean-Joseph Rabearivelo and future-president, Thabo Mbeki.

In the same year he received a five-year banning order. The previous year he had joined the High Command of Umkhonto we Sizwe, attending clandestine meetings at Lilliesleaf Farm in Rivonia. He was named as a co-conspirator in the Rivonia Trial of 1963–64.

On the occasion of the SACP's fiftieth anniversary in 1971, he was asked to write a biography of the party. He wrote Fifty Fighting Years, publishing it under the pen name, A. Lerumo.

In 1972, he relocated to Prague on a secondment, as the SACP's representative for the publication, World Marxist Review.

In 2021, his science fiction novel, The White People, was published posthumously by Jacana in South Africa. Harmel wrote the novel in 1959, it examines the state of the world amid the Cold War.

== Personal life ==
In the late 1930s, whilst living in London, he reportedly had a brief relationship with the South African writer, Noni Jabavu.

Harmel married Ray Harmel (née Adler) in 1940, a fellow activist, who had emigrated to South Africa from Lithuania via Germany, with whom he had a daughter, Barbara. The couple separated in the mid-1960s, whilst living in exile in London. The family lived in Yeoville before building a family home in 1954 in The Gardens, a suburb of Johannesburg. This home became a place of welcome and refuge for key political figures being pursued by the South African police, such as Nelson Mandela, Winnie Mandela, Walter Sisulu, Ahmed Kathrada, Bram Fischer and Sheila Weinberg and her family. A blue plaque now adorns their former home, commemorating the legacy of both Ray and Michael Harmel.

Harmel and Ray were friends with Nelson Mandela and his wife, Winnie. Glamorous photographs of the couple in their wedding attire were taken at the Harmel home in Johannesburg.

Harmel later entered into a relationship with an Irishwoman, Kathleen O’Callaghan.

Harmel died of a cerebral haemorrhage in Prague on 18 June 1974. He was cremated and his ashes kept in an urn at Břevnov cemetery in Prague. His ashes were scattered in a glade in Liboc-Vokovice in 2005.

A blue plaque adorns the former home of Michael and Ray in The Gardens, a suburb of Johannesburg. It honours their social and political work during the apartheid era.
