= Lazar Bach =

Latvian-South African communist activist

Lazar Bach (1906 – 10 March 1941) was a Latvian-South African communist activist, most notable for his time as chair of the Communist Party of South Africa.

== Early life and career ==
Born in Latvia to a Jewish family, Bach's father owned a factory, and was sentenced to death during the Russian Civil War. Bach joined the Latvian Communist Party and became an expert on party policy. In 1930, he emigrated to Johannesburg where he became a leather worker, joining the Leather Workers' Union, and the Communist Party of South Africa (CPSA). As a fluent Russian-speaker with a strong knowledge of communism, Bach soon became prominent in the party, and was elected to its central committee in 1931. A firm supporter of party leader Douglas Wolton, Bach became known as his second-in-command.

== Political rise ==
By 1933, party membership had fallen to only 150, and Wolton moved to England, leaving Bach to become chair of the party, its leading figure. Under his leadership, he maintained Wolton's loyalty to the current line of the Soviet Union, and readily expelled opponents, including Moses Kotane, although he was soon readmitted. However, the Comintern became unhappy with the party's leadership, and asked many leading figures in the party to go to Moscow to discuss their performance. Most of them feared that they would be detained there, and were reluctant to go, with Louis Joffe explicitly warning Bach not to go.

Despite the warning, Bach went to Moscow in 1935 along with Kotane. George Hardy was sent from the Communist Party of Great Britain to try to resolve conflict between the factions supporting each of the rivals, but was unable to make progress. In response, Maurice and Paul Richter, supporters of Bach, were also called to Moscow, while Kotane received support in the city from Josie Mpama, a party member who was studying at the Communist University of the Toilers of the East (KUTV). Bach also attended KUTV while in the city.

Bach was still in the city the following year, when the Seventh Congress of the Comintern was held. He attended the congress as a consultative delegate, while Mpama was the CPSA's full delegate. Mpama gave a speech implying that the popular front strategy, newly championed by the Comintern, should be merely the means to achieve an independent republic led by black South Africans. The leadership of the Comintern were very unhappy about the content of the speech, which they believed had been written by Bach and Aleksandr Zusmanovich.

=== Detention and death ===
Bach, along with the Richters, was put under suspicion of being a Trotskyist or Zinovievist, charges put forcefully by Robert Naumann. They were required to remain in Moscow while the charge was investigated, and on 28 October 1936 were found guilty by the Comintern's International Control Commission. They were placed in detention on 10 March 1937 and sent to gulags on the Kolyma River. While the Richters were later executed on charges of terrorism, Bach was reported to have died of natural causes in 1941.

Party political offices
Preceded by Douglas Wolton	Chair of the Communist Party of South Africa; 1933–1935	Succeeded by Issie Wolfson
