= Douglas Wolton =

South African Communist Party chairman (1899–1988)

Secretary-General of the South African Communist Party
- In office 1929–1929
- Preceded by: Jimmy Shields (journalist)
- Succeeded by: Albert Nzula

Chairman of the South African Communist Party
- In office 1931–1933
- Preceded by: Sidney Bunting
- Succeeded by: Lazar Bach

Personal details
- Born: 1898 Doncaster, England, United Kingdom
- Died: 1988 (aged 89–90) England, United Kingdom
- Citizenship: British
- Party: Communist Party of South Africa

Born in Doncaster in England, Wolton moved to South Africa in 1921, and he joined the CPSA in 1925. He met a fellow party member named Molly, who had been born in Lithuania, and were married by the end of the year.

From about 1928, the Comintern proposed a policy in which the CPSA would first campaign for a "native republic", in which black South Africans would assume leading roles, with this being a stepping stone to socialism. Party leader Sydney Bunting strongly opposed the approach, but the Woltons supported it. By the start of 1929, they had won the debate in the party, which adopted the policy, and Douglas was elected as general secretary of the CPSA and editor of its newspaper, the South African Worker. He also stood in the 1929 South African general election in Cape Flats as an independent. Although he held some large meetings, he was heavily defeated.

In July 1929, the couple went on a trip to England, and Douglas stood down from his positions. Douglas began working for the Communist Party of Great Britain's (CPGB) Colonial Department, then in 1930 the couple went to Moscow, where they attended the Fifth Congress of the Red International of Labour Unions. Douglas was made a consultative delegate on behalf of the CPGB, and he took part in discussions about the situation in South Africa, helping the Comintern draft directives on how their policies should be applied in the country. He was ordered to return to South Africa in September, although Molly remained in Moscow, studying at the Lenin School.

Douglas arrived back in South Africa in November 1930, and immediately began circulating the Comintern's directives. He was soon elected as chair of the party, effectively its leader. On the request of the Comintern, he expelled members who had opposed the "native republic" policy, describing them as "rightists". This created an atmosphere of confusion and sectarianism, and many other members resigned, the party membership falling to only 350. Molly soon joined him, and the couple worked closely with Lazar Bach to run the party. They were targeted by the South African government; in 1932, Douglas was sentenced to hard labour, while early in 1933 he was convicted of encouraging transport workers in Cape Town to strike and was imprisoned.

By 1933, Molly was suffering with a heart condition and her mental and physical health collapsed. She believed that she would benefit from more advanced healthcare available in England, and Douglas' brother wrote to him with details of a job at the Yorkshire Post. In response, the couple left the country without the authorisation of the Comintern, to which Douglas wrote a letter, giving the reasons for their departure and justifying his performance as party leader. They settled in Sheffield, where Douglas attempted to start a newspaper, but the enterprise was unsuccessful, and he instead found work selling industrial paint. Molly died in 1945, and Douglas remarried, living until 1988.

In 1947, Wolton published a book, Whither, South Africa?

Party political offices
Preceded by Jimmy Shields	General Secretary of the Communist Party of South Africa; 1929	Succeeded by Albert Nzula
Preceded by Sidney Bunting	Chair of the Communist Party of South Africa; 1931–1933	Succeeded by Lazar Bach
