= Jimmy Shields (journalist) =

British communist activist (1900–1949)

Jimmy Shields (January 1900 – 13 April 1949) was a British communist activist and newspaper editor.

Born in Greenock, Shields joined the Communist Party of Great Britain (CPGB) in 1921. Out of work, he moved to South Africa in 1925, where he became a member of the Communist Party of South Africa (CPSA), and within months was its General Secretary. During this period, one of his speeches convinced Edwin Thabo Mofutsanyana to join the CPSA.

Shields returned to Scotland in 1927, where he served in various CPGB posts. He was on the Executive, Political, and Appeals committees. He was one of the first editors of the Party newspaper, the Daily Worker. Starting in 1932, he was the British representative to the Comintern, and he travelled extensively as head of the CPGB's international department. It was later revealed that he and his wife Violet were under surveillance by MI5.

Shields contracted tuberculosis during World War II and spent much of the war at Holt Sanitorium. He died there in 1949.

Party political offices
Preceded by William H. Andrews	General Secretary of the Communist Party of South Africa; 1925–1927	Succeeded by Douglas Wolton
Media offices
Preceded by William Rust	Editor of the Daily Worker; 1933–1935	Succeeded by Idris Cox
