= Right2Know =

South African non-profit organisation

Right2Know Campaign
- Founded: August 2010; 16 years ago
- Founders: Mark Thabo Weinberg and others
- Type: Nonprofit organization
- Purpose: Digital rights, activism, and access to information
- Location: 1st Floor Community House, 41 Salt River Rd, Salt River, Cape Town, 7925, South Africa
- Coordinates: 33°55′48″S 18°27′27″E
- Expenses: R3.22 million (2014) roughly equivalent to US$227,000
- Website: www.theright2know.org

The Right2Know Campaign is a South African non-profit advocacy organisation established in 2010 to reduce state secrecy in the drafting of laws, increase access to information, and protect freedom of expression especially on the internet. As part of this, the campaign monitors and challenges potential legislation that it believes would infringe on personal liberties and transparent government. It is the first such organisation of its kind in post-Apartheid South Africa.

== Activism ==
Notable events that the Right2Know Campaign has been directly involved in include organising protests for investigations into corporate and government corruption, protect whistle-blowers, and campaigns to increase government accountability.

A significant success of the campaign was the calling for and eventual publication by government of South Africa's list of national key points, thereby informing the public of which government locations in South Africa were forbidden to photograph. It was claimed by government that the controversial security upgrades to President Jacob Zuma's homestead, Nkandla, was justified as it was a listed national key point.

In October 2015, South African State Security officials issued a statement to the South African parliament accusing the Right2Know Campaign of being an agent for foreign governments and the US government in particular. The Right2Know campaign denied the accusations whilst stating that it openly publishes all of its financials to the public which indicate no such link and condemned the accusation as an example of the growing securitisation of the South African parliament. It went on to point out that the South African security establishment have previously used such accusations in the past to try and explain public discontent by blaming a range of non-government organisations as foreign agents.

ICASA seems intent on closing down community radio stations and at least 29 community radio licenses were revoked in 2019 Community Radio takes place in a complex environment The Rooting R2K in Community Radio is a campaign intended to rebuild community media
