= Mark Thabo Weinberg =

South African socialist & anti-apartheid activist

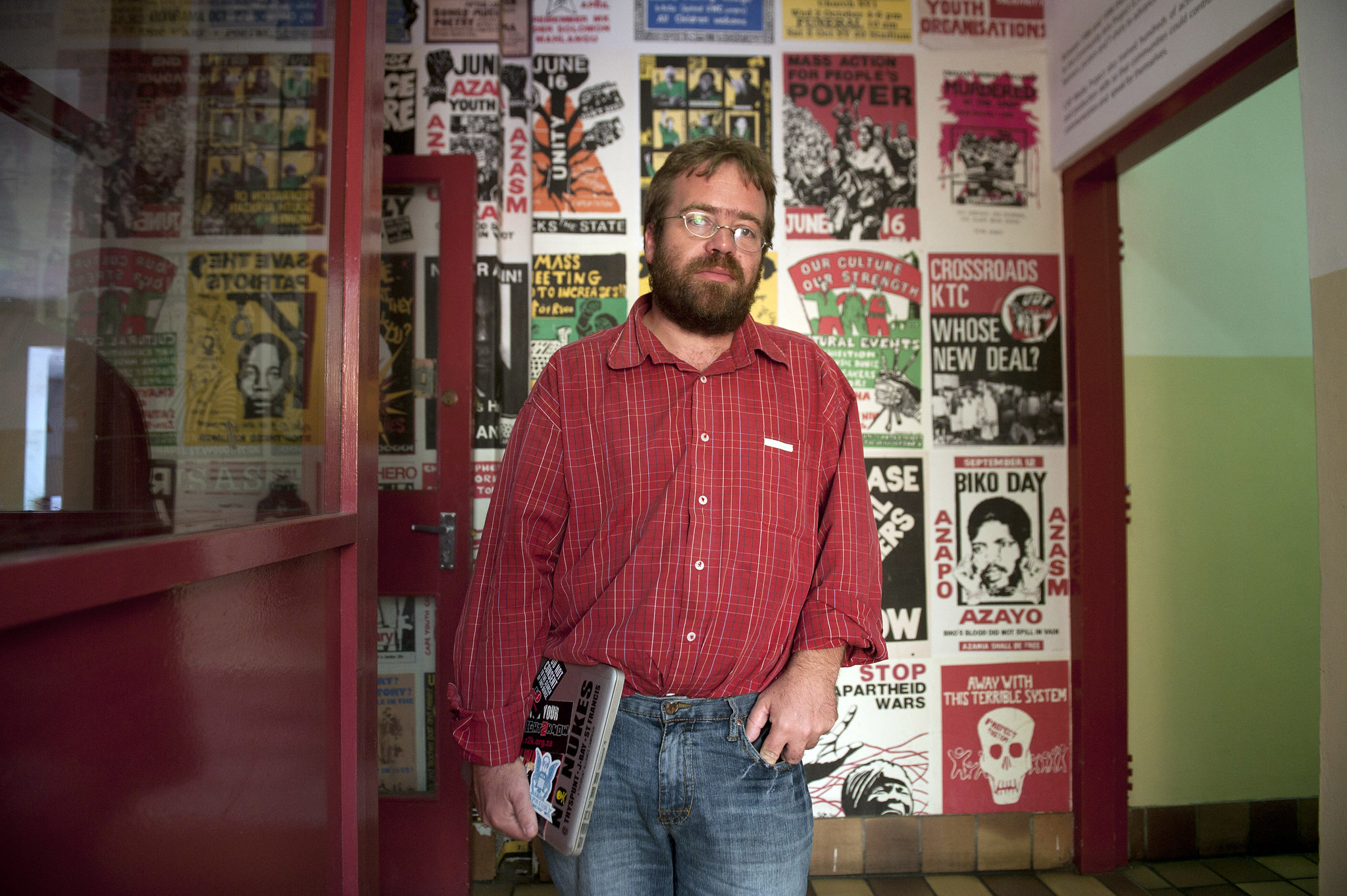
Mark Weinberg in the foyer of Community House, below Right2Know's national office, in Salt River, Cape Town.

Mark Thabo Weinberg (5 January 1974 – 28 January 2025) was a South African socialist activist best known for his role in the creation and success of the Right2Know Campaign ("R2K"). He was the son of Sheila Weinberg, and grandson of Eli and Violet Weinberg, all prominent anti-apartheid activists. The family's contribution to the struggle for justice has been honoured by the naming of a park in Johannesburg, and by the family home being declared a provincial heritage site. At the time of his death, Weinberg was General Secretary of Yetu Infotech Collective, as well as serving on boards of civil society organisations such as AIDC and Cape Town TV.

== Childhood and youth ==
Weinberg grew up as the only child of a solo parent who suffered repression and harassment, as did her parents (who were exiled from 1976 and 1977 respectively) and her associates. Besides witnessing his mother's personal struggles (e.g. to be able to visit his exiled grandmother after his grandfather's death), he witnessed her involvement in key moments in the anti-apartheid struggle such as the 1983 launch of the United Democratic Front and the 1985 trial of Mosiuoa Lekota and Popo Molefe. However, in his late teens came the first breakthroughs in the struggle against apartheid such as the 1991 release of Nelson Mandela and the unbanning of the African National Congress, and at a personal level, the return of his grandmother from exile. In 1994 his mother was elected a member of the Provincial Legislature of Gauteng where she served for 10 years.

== Activism and work ==
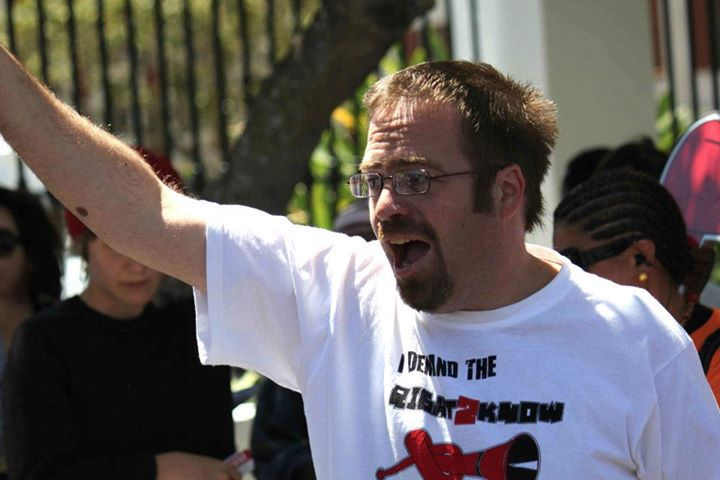
Mark Thabo Weinberg at a public event of the Right2Know Campaign

Weinberg began independent activism upon entering the University of Witwatersrand. His experience of student media led him into community media after leaving university without completing a degree. He then moved through a variety of civil society organisations, gaining experience which eventually enabled him to take on founding roles in new organisations.

The R2K, of which he was national coordinator as well as co-founder, was notably able to mobilise not only grassroots activists, but professionals, academics and "policy wonks." It was formed in response to the Protection of State Information Bill, which sought to expand the powers of South Africa's security agencies to classify information as secret; over time, the organisation took on an expanded mandate to promote transparency, freedom of expression, and public participation.

The significance of the R2K can be gauged from the fact that under president Jacob Zuma, the State Security Agency targeted it for infiltration, for purposes of surveillance and/or destabilisation, as revealed by the Zondo Commission.

Weinberg's final project, Yetu Infotech Collective, aims to address the digital divide in civil society.

== Personal life ==
Weinberg married Celeste Fortuin; they had three children: Liam followed by twins Sasha and Luke. He died at their family home in Harfield Village, Cape Town.
