= Idris Cox =

Welsh communist activist (1899–1989)

- Born: July 15, 1899; Maesteg, Glamorgan, Wales
- Died: June 25, 1989 (aged 89)
- Occupations: Communist activist and newspaper editor
- Spouse: Dora Roberts (m. 1931)
- Children: 2

Idris Cox (15 July 1899 – 25 June 1989) was a Welsh communist activist, political candidate, newspaper editor, and author.

== Biography ==
Born into a mining family in Llwydiarth Cottages, Maesteg, Cox spent most of his childhood in Cwmfelin. He started working in a coal mine at a young age. His family was deeply religious, and he attended chapel three times each Sunday. However, his religious commitment diminished as he joined the trade union movement and involved himself in the South Wales miners' strike of 1915. At age 18, he was elected to the management committee of the Garth Miners' Institute. In 1920 he became the lodge's delegate to coalfield conferences. He grew interested in Marxism, and served as chairman of the local miners' lodge during the 1921 lockout.

In 1923, the South Wales Miners' Federation granted Cox a scholarship, enabling him to study at the Central Labour College in London. Following the 1924 general election, he joined the Communist Party of Great Britain (CPGB). He returned to Wales in 1925 but was unable to find work, other than a short stint as a deputy-checkweigher. He proceeded to establish a branch of the National Unemployed Workers' Movement in Maesteg, and continued his communist activity there.

By 1926, Cox was an Area Organiser for the CPGB in Mid Glamorgan. He was also active in the Labour Party, and was elected vice-chairman of its Maesteg branch in 1927. He meanwhile was rising in the CPGB, becoming District Secretary in 1927, and then named to its National Executive in 1928. In that same year, he attended the 6th World Congress of the Communist International held in Moscow.

Cox returned to London in 1929 to join the CPGB's political bureau. He also worked as a correspondent for the Workers' Weekly. During much of the 1930s, he held the position of the Party's National Organiser, which required him to visit mining and rural areas throughout Britain, with the aim of building local electoral bases for communist candidates.

In 1930 he met fellow communist Dora Roberts (1904–2000) at CPGB headquarters in London. They married the following year and had two children together.

In 1934, Cox stood in the South Wales County Council elections for the Caerau and Nantyffyllon division in the Maesteg Valley, finishing a close second to the Labour candidate. In 1935 he was named editor of the Party's London-based newspaper, the Daily Worker. He returned to Wales in 1936, as Secretary of the Welsh District of the CPGB. He remained in that role until 1951, when he stood unsuccessfully as the Party candidate in Rhondda East. In June 1951 he became head of the International Department of the CPGB, and was involved in the Movement for Colonial Freedom.

Cox authored numerous books and pamphlets, including The People Can Save South Wales (1936), Forward to a New Life for South Wales (1944), Empire Today (1960), Socialist Ideas in Africa (1966), and The Hungry Half: a Study in the Exploitation of the 'Third World' (1970). In 1948 he translated the Communist Manifesto into Welsh. He was a frequent contributor to the CPGB's monthly magazine, Marxism Today, and wrote the article marking the Party's 50th anniversary.

Cox retired in 1970. He worked on an autobiography, Story of a Welsh Rebel. Although the manuscript was undated and unpublished, it was believed to have been completed in 1972.

On 25 June 1989, Idris Cox died in Talywain near Pontypool. He was 89. While some obituaries were complimentary, he also received criticism for his longtime allegiance to the Communist Party.

Media offices
Preceded by Jimmy Shields	Editor of the Daily Worker; 1935–1936	Succeeded by Rajani Palme Dutt
Party political offices
Preceded by ?	Secretary of the Welsh District of the Communist Party of Great Britain; 1936–1951	Succeeded by Alun Thomas
