= J. B. Marks =

South African communist activist (1903-1972)

Secretary-General of the South African Communist Party
- In office 1931–1933
- Preceded by: Albert Nzula
- Succeeded by: Moses Kotane

Chairman of the South African Communist Party
- In office 1962–1972
- Succeeded by: Yusuf Dadoo

Treasurer-general of the African National Congress
- In office 1968–1971
- Preceded by: Moses Kotane
- Succeeded by: Moses Kotane

Personal details
- Born: John Beaver Marks; 21 March 1903 Ventersdorp, Transvaal Colony
- Died: 1 August 1972 (aged 69) Moscow, Soviet Union
- Resting place: Pella, North West
- Party: African National Congress; South African Communist Party
- Education: International Lenin School; Communist University of the Toilers of the East
- Occupation: Politician
- Awards: Order for Meritorious Service in gold (2003)

John Beaver Marks (popularly known as J. B. Marks; 21 March 1903 – 1 August 1972) joined the South African Communist Party (SACP) in 1928, at the age of 25. He was sent to the Soviet Union for the first time in 1930, as a student at the Communist University of the Toilers of the East (KUTV), as a result of funding from the Soviet Union in 1929. When he returned in 1933, he became the Communist party secretary. In 1934 rumours arose that he was a police informer and this may have been the reason he lost his position as party secretary in 1934-35. As supporter of party secretary Lazar Bach, who was recalled to the Soviet Union and killed there in 1936, Marks was also summoned to Moscow, but managed to bungle his exit and never arrived there.

Moscow was in no doubt that he did this on purpose and he was then expelled from the SACP in 1937. Expulsions from the party were generally suspensions rather than actual expulsions and by 1945 he managed not only to rejoin the party but to become the head of the African Mine Workers' Union, in spite of the fact that he had no previous experience of union work. Thus the miners strike of 1946 was poorly supported last for only three days and Marks was arrested.

Marks was elected as president of the Transvaal African National Congress in 1951, but later lost this position to Nelson Mandela. In 1962 he became chairman of the SACP and in 1968 treasurer of the ANC. He had a stroke in 1971. Yusuf Dadoo took over as SACP chairman after following his death in 1972.

On 1 March 2015, the remains of Marks were returned to South Africa together with Moses Kotane's remains and he was reburied on 14 March at Pella, North West.

== See also ==
- List of people subject to banning orders under apartheid -

== Sources ==
- Roth, Mia (20 January 2016), The Communist Party in South Africa: Racism, Eurocentricity and Moscow, 1921-1950, Partridge Africa, ISBN 978-1-4828-0964-0

Party political offices
Preceded by Albert Nzula	General Secretary of the South African Communist Party; 1931–1933	Succeeded by Moses Kotane
