= Gertrude Shope =

South African trade unionist and politician (1925–2025)

Gertrude Ntiti Shope OMSS (15 August 1925 – 22 May 2025) was a South African trade unionist and politician.

== Life and career ==
Born in Johannesburg on 15 August 1925, Shope was raised and educated in Bulawayo, Southern Rhodesia (now Zimbabwe). She worked as a teacher before becoming a member of the African National Congress in 1954. Joining the campaign against Bantu education, she turned to teaching crafts instead. She then became active in the Federation of South African Women, and for a time led the Central Western Jabavu Branch of the ANC women's section. She lived in exile from 1966 to 1990, leading the party's delegation to the Nairobi Women's Meeting and working for the World Federation of Trade Unions. From 1970 until 1971 she was secretary to Florence Moposho, helping to establish publication of the newsletter Voice of Women. With her husband, Mark, she lived in a variety of locations during her exile, including Prague, Botswana, Tanzania, Czechoslovakia, Zambia, and Nigeria. In Lusaka she served as chief representative for the African National Congress. From 1991 to 1993 Shope headed the African National Congress Women's League. In the 1994 general election she was returned to parliament.

She was married to her husband Mark Shope in 1957 till her husband's death in 1998, with whom she had three children: politician Lyndall and diplomats Lenin and Thaninga.

Shope died on 22 May 2025, at the age of 99. President of South Africa, Cyril Ramaphosa directed national flags to be flown at half-mast.
