= Council of Non-European Trade Unions =

South African trade union federation

The Council of Non-European Trade Unions (CNETU) was a national trade union federation bringing together unions representing Black African workers in South Africa.

The federation was established in November 1941 with the merger of the Non-European Trade Union Coordinating Committee and the recently founded Joint Committee of African Trade Unions, associated with Max Gordon. Moses Kotane, the leader of the South African Communist Party (SACP), presided over the inaugural conference. Gana Makabeni, who had been the leader of the Coordinating Committee of African Trade Unions was elected president, and David Gosani elected secretary.

In 1945, the federation was near its peak, with 119 unions and 158,000 members, a majority from the Witwatersrand. Most of the members of these unions were not recognised by the government or the employers, for the purposes of participation in the statutory industrial relations system established in 1924. However, the war economy led to rapid increases of manufacturing industry, bringing large numbers of African workers into urban areas and expanding their bargaining power, while also increasing the price of food and other goods.

This led to much industrial unrest by these workers: there were 37 recorded strikes by African workers in 1941 alone. One effect was that the government and many employers increasingly but informally recognised CNETU unions. After a one-day strike by workers organised by CNETU in December 1942, for example, the Johannesburg City Council agreed to raise the salaries of these workers by 60%.

The federation leadership was heavily drawn from the SACP, including men like J. B. Marks and Dan Tloome. However, the union federation was not formally affiliated to the SACP, and Makabeni also distanced himself from the party, from which he had been expelled in 1932. CNETU also included an important Trotskyist current, linked to the Workers' International League, and organised around the Progressive Trade Union Group. The Trotskyist opposition's platform included proposals for more militant and sustained strike action.

Makabeni himself favoured a cautious approach, opposing strike action and campaigning for government recognition of African unions in the industrial relations system, with the rights attendant upon that, such as protected strikes. When the Soviet Union entered the Second World War against Nazi Germany in 1941, the SACP-- like its counterparts elsewhere -- discouraged strike action as a threat to the anti-fascist war effort, including in CNETU. The Jan Smuts government meanwhile also introduced wartime measures that sharply limited the scope for union activities.

In 1945, Makabeni was replaced by Marks. In 1946, the CNETU's largest affiliate, the miners' union, led the massive but unsuccessful African Mine Workers' Strike. Many in the African National Congress and the SACP sought, unsuccessfully, to make this into a general strike.

CNETU went into decline, partly as a result of the defeat.In the aftermath of the strike, the SACP leadership was arrested and tried for their role. In 1947, a group of unions split away, to form a rival Council of African Trade Unions. In 1948, the apartheid government was elected, and in 1950 it banned the SACP, as well as proscribed many people with SACP (as well as Trotskyist) links from public activity, including trade union work. In 1950, only 53 unions were affiliated to the federation. Soon after the passing of the Native Labour (Settlement of Disputes) Act, 1953, which essentially banned almost all strikes by black African workers, CNETU collapsed.
