= Max Gordon (trade unionist) =

Max Gordon (1 April 1910 – 10 May 1977) was a South African trade union leader and Trotskyist activist.

Born in Cape Town as Max Livetsky, his father died when he was young. He was adopted, and his surname was changed to "Gordon". He studied at the University of Cape Town, and while there joined the Workers Party of South Africa, a Trotskyist organisation.

In 1935, Gordon relocated to Johannesburg to work as an industrial chemist. He also became the leader of the African Laundry Workers' Union. The union was nearly defunct, and although he was initially able to revive it, an unofficial strike the following year proved a major setback. Gordon decided to work with the registered trade unions to improve the position of black workers, and was able increase minimum wages in several industries, and win back-pay for many workers. The South African Institute for Race Relations began to support his work, and from 1938 the Bantu Welfare Trust paid him a wage, enabling him to work full time as a trade union organiser.

Gordon established numerous unions, in bakeries, dairies, print works and also in distribution, in addition to an African General Workers' Union. In 1940, he established the Joint Committee of African Trade Unions, whose affiliates had a total of around 20,000 members. However, Gordon opposed both sides in World War II, and so in 1941 was interned. He was released a year later, by which time the Joint Committee had split, many unions becoming part of the Council of Non-European Trade Unions. Instead, he moved to Port Elizabeth, where he founded six new trade unions, but the white labour movement refused to support him, and the South African government threatened him with further internment if he persisted. Gordon decided he could make no further progress, and emigrated to London. Later in life, Gordon returned to Cape Town, where he worked for Gerber Goldschmidt.
