= Lyndall Shope-Mafole =

South African politician

General Secretary of the Congress of the People
- In office January 2014 – January 2019
- President: Mosiuoa Lekota
- Deputy: Deidre Carter
- Preceded by: Herself (acting)
- Succeeded by: Papi Kganare

Member of the Gauteng Provincial Legislature
- In office 6 May 2009 – 6 May 2014

Personal details
- Born: Lyndall Fanisa Shope; 1957 or 1958 (age 68–69) Johannesburg, Transvaal; Union of South Africa
- Party: Congress of the People (since 2008)
- Other political affiliations: African National Congress (until 2008)
- Relations: George Shope (half-brother); Sheila Sithole (half-sister); Ntombi Shope (half-sister); Lenin Shope (brother); Thaninga Shope-Linney (sister)
- Parent(s): Mark Shope and Gertrude Shope
- Education: Polytechnic José Antonio Echeverría

Lyndall Fanisa Shope-Mafole (née Shope; born 1957 or 1958) is a South African politician and former civil servant who was the general secretary of the Congress of the People (COPE) from 2014 to 2019. She led COPE's caucus in the Gauteng Provincial Legislature from 2009 until 2014, when she failed to gain re-election.

Born into the African National Congress (ANC) to anti-apartheid stalwarts Mark and Gertude Shope, Shope-Mafole was raised and educated in exile during apartheid. She was briefly a member of the ANC's National Executive Committee from December 2007 until October 2008, when she resigned to become a founding member of COPE. Before joining the provincial legislature, Shope-Mafole had a high-profile career in telecommunications policy and governance, most proximately as director-general in the Department of Communications from 2004 to 2009.

== Early life ==
Shope-Mafole was born in 1957 or 1958 in Johannesburg in the former Transvaal. Her parents are Mark Shope and Gertrude Shope, both stalwarts of the anti-apartheid movement and African National Congress (ANC). She has four siblings: Thaninga Shope-Linney is a former SABC manager and diplomat; Lenin Shope was also a diplomat; and two half-sisters born to her father, Ntombi and Sheila, were also ANC politicians.

Her parents went into exile after the ANC was banned by the apartheid government in 1960, and Shope-Mafole lived in Zimbabwe with her aunt. She later lived with her parents at ANC missions in Botswana, Czechoslovakia, Zambia, and Tanzania. She was a member of the ANC's children's wing in exile, the Young Pioneers. According to Shope-Mafole, when she was at high school in Zambia, she qualified to compete in the Olympics but was unable to participate because she could not represent South Africa, her home country.

She later lived in Cairo and New York with her husband, who was an ANC representative. She completed a Master of Science in telecommunications engineering at the José Antonio Echeverría Higher Institute of Technology in Havana, Cuba, in 1983, and she returned to South Africa in the 1990s during the democratic transition.

== Civil service: 1994–2009 ==
=== Independent Broadcasting Authority: 1994–1997 ===
During an advanced stage of the transition, in March 1994, Shope-Mafole was appointed as a member of the inaugural council of the new Independent Broadcasting Authority (IBA); her term was renewed by Parliament in 1996. In that capacity, she represented South Africa at the International Telecommunications Union (ITU) in Geneva. The Mail & Guardian said that, despite being an ordinary councillor, she was considered "almost as powerful" as IBA's chairs.

However, in 1997, Shope-Mafole was named by the Auditor-General – in a report leaked to the press in May – as one of the councillors who used IBA credit cards to purchase private luxuries. Shope-Mafole said that private use of the cards was authorised in terms of IBA policy provided that the councillors eventually repaid the money. Although she and the other councillors initially held a press conference at which they said they would not resign, they were forced to do so later in 1997 after facing heavy criticism from Parliament's Standing Committee on Public Accounts.

=== Communications policy: 1997–2004 ===
After leaving IBA, Shope-Mafole was appointed as an adviser to Jay Naidoo, then the Minister of Communications. In February 1999, she was appointed as South Africa's permanent representative to the ITU in Geneva, formally a diplomatic posting with close ties to Naidoo's ministry. Naidoo was succeeded by Ivy Matsepe-Casaburri after the 1999 general election and Shope-Mafole was described as a key "unofficial adviser" to Matsepe-Casaburri, in parallel with her official posting in Geneva.

In subsequent years, she held various positions in communications policy and governance, including as the chairperson of President Thabo Mbeki's Presidential National Commission on Information Society and Development, chairperson of the ITU council, and member of the United Nations Information and Communication Technologies Task Force.

=== Communications DG: 2004–2009 ===
On 15 September 2004, President Mbeki appointed Shope-Mafole as the director-general in the Department of Communications, still under the political leadership of Matsepe-Casaburri. She remained in that position until February 2009. At the end of 2006, the Mail & Guardian gave her an "E" grade as director-general, saying that the department was "having no real impact"; Shope-Mafole said that she would give herself a "C".

== Defection from the ANC: 2008–2009 ==
During her tenure in the Department of Communications, Shope-Mafole remained active in the ANC. At the party's 52nd National Conference in December 2007, the ANC Youth League nominated her to stand for election to a five-year term on the ANC National Executive Committee (NEC); she was elected as one of 80 ordinary members, ranked 46th by number of votes received. The committee appointed her to chair its subcommittee on political education and ideology.

However, at the 52nd National Conference, Shope-Mafole supported President Mbeki's bid to secure a third term in the ANC presidency, the failure of which led to upheaval in the ANC, especially after Sam Shilowa and Mosiuoa Lekota resigned from the ANC and announced a search for political alternatives. In late October 2008, Shope-Mafole announced that she would resign from the ANC and would be the opening speaker at the "national convention" called by Lekota and Shilowa. She was the second member of the ANC NEC to resign, after Charlotte Lobe.

She explained that she was resigning not primarily because she was attracted to Shilowa and Lekota's alternative but because she found herself in the "wrong company" at the ANC. She said that she was particularly concerned about public statements by ANC Youth League leader Julius Malema and by the ANC's decision to fire President Mbeki and, before that, various provincial premiers. She said, "If I hadn’t been in the ANC’s national executive committee I might not have left, but being in the NEC made me part of the leadership and decisions that I have to take responsibility for".

The national convention, held in early November 2008, led ultimately to the formation of the Congress of the People (COPE), a new opposition party. When COPE was formally launched in December 2008, Shope was announced as the party's head of international relations.

Shope-Mafole initially said that she would not resign from the Department of Communications. She said that she accepted that she had been given the job as "a deployed cadre" but argued that her contract with the state remained in place until September 2010; she said, "I will continue to implement government policy and just do political work the way other people play golf." However, on 5 February 2009, Matsepe-Casaburri's office announced that Shope-Mafole would leave the department with immediate effect by mutual agreement.

== Political career in COPE: 2009–present ==
=== Provincial legislature: 2009–2014 ===
In the weeks after her resignation from the civil service, the Mail & Guardian reported that COPE was considering Shope-Mafole as a possible candidate for election as Premier of the North West. Instead, at the end of February 2009, she was announced as its candidate for Premier of Gauteng. She was therefore ranked first on COPE's provincial party list for Gauteng and, in that year's general election, she won one of COPE's six seats in the Gauteng Provincial Legislature. Although she was not elected Premier, she served as leader of COPE's caucus in the legislature. She was authorised to take extended sick leave, lasting over a year, in 2012 and 2013.

Her term in the legislature coincided with serious division in COPE, precipitated by rivalry between Lekota, COPE's president, and Shilowa, his deputy. Shope-Mafole was aligned to Lekota in the factional struggles that followed, and in February 2011 she was one of several senior COPE members whom Shilowa's faction purported to suspend from the party. By the time of the party's next national elective congress in January 2014, the rivalry had been settled in Lekota's favour by a court ruling, and Shope-Mafole was elected as national COPE general secretary, a position she had held in an acting capacity since January 2012. Deidre Carter was elected as her deputy.

=== Later career ===
Shope-Mafole left the legislature after the 2014 general election, in which she was again COPE's top-ranked candidate for Gauteng but in which COPE failed to win any seats in the Gauteng Provincial Legislature. In 2016, she was one of 27 former director-generals who signed an open letter calling for a public inquiry to investigate allegations of state capture during the presidency of Jacob Zuma. At COPE's second national elective congress in January 2019, she was succeeded as general secretary by Papi Kganare.

== Personal life and business interests ==
Shope-Mafole married Tebogo Mafole in the 1970s; he died in South Africa in 1998. They had two sons: Kgotso, who has cerebral palsy, and Sandile. In 2007, the Mail & Guardian reported that she was married to Henry Chasia, who worked at the New Partnership for Africa's Development. As of 2014, she lived on a golf estate in Centurion, Gauteng with her mother, who remained an ANC member.

Upon joining the provincial legislature in 2009, Shope-Mafole declared a R200-million stake in Rentokil, a pest control company.
