= 1946 African Mine Workers' Union strike =

Miner's strike in South Africa

1946 South African Mine Workers' strike
- Date: 12 August 1946 – 16 August 1946

Parties
Striking Workers	South African government Mining companies

Casualties and losses
At least nine deaths; At least 1,248 injured	

The South African Mine Workers' Strike was a labour dispute involving mine workers of Witwatersrand in South Africa. It started on 12 August 1946 and lasted approximately a week. The strike was attacked by police and over the week, at least 1,248 workers were wounded and at least nine killed.

== African Mine Workers' Union ==
In 1941 a miners' conference was called by the Transvaal Provincial Committee of the African National Congress. The conference was supported by Paramount Chief of Zululand and trade unions.

It was here that the African Mine Workers' Union came into being and elected a committee under the presidency of J. B. Marks, who also became President of the Transvaal African National Congress.

At first the union was not recognised by the Chamber of Mines, but after sustained pressure for better wages and conditions, the prime minister, Field Marshal Jan Smuts, announced some piecemeal increases improvements in conditions while at the same time issuing War Measure No. 1425—banning gatherings of more than twenty people on mining property without permission.

Despite union officials being arrested in 1944 at a meeting in Witwatersrand and in Springs, a conference was held in May 1946 which decided to approach the government with demands for a ten shillings a day wage and other improvements—or to take strike action.

On August 12, 1946, more than 60,000 workers in Witwatersrand refused to continue working for the existing wages. Within a week police were deployed and incorporated brutal tactics in an effort to break the strike. Officially 9 died and more than 1,248 workers were injured, and many regarded the strike as a failure. Although the initial demands were ignored and the workers returned to the mines after only a week, the strike was viewed as a crucial moment in South Africa's development. Ultimately this initial protest later influenced political realignments, and has been associated with increased labour conscience and social change. By addressing the conditions necessary to maintain cheap migrant labour, this movement provided insight into the manner in which Apartheid serves as a vehicle for perpetuating pre-capitalist modes of production. Methods such as the 'compound system', which essentially restrained workers from having any contact with Union organizers, were direct results of the initial failed Union Strike of 1946.

In August 1946 an open air conference was held in Newtown Market Square as no hall where Africans could hold meetings was big enough to accommodate those present and the decision to strike was taken.

== Bloody Tuesday ==
The police attacked the workers with batons, bayonets, and gunfire outside the mines and in the mines when forced to work.

Police brutality reached a bloody climax on a peaceful march from the East Rand to Johannesburg on Tuesday, 13 August. Police opened fire on the procession and a number of workers were killed.

This led to the Transvaal Council of Non-European Trade Unions (CONETU) calling a general strike in Johannesburg on Wednesday, 14 August. CONETU called a meeting at Newtown Market Square the next day which was banned by the Riotous Assemblies Act. This meeting was also attacked by police with guns and bayonets.

During the week workers and leaders of the ANC, the Communist Party, the Indian and Coloured Congresses and the trade unions were arrested, tried, imprisoned, and deported.

The 1946 African miners strike signified a shift in public conscience, and was widely considered the beginning of what would later become the anti-apartheid movement. This strike, "was led by the African Mine Workers Union, whose president, J.B. Marks, was also a leader in the South African Communist Party."

Most workers averaged two shillings per shift, and were responsible for contributing a portion of their wages towards work clothes and bedding. Many were removed from their families, sometimes for years, while their children and spouses starved. The AMWU initially placed demands to create a legal minimum wage, cost-of-living allowance, and regular wage increases. The miners settled on a 10 shilling per day minimum wage, and improved working conditions as the basis of their demands.

The Transvaal Chamber of Mines functioned as a closely knit cartel comprising five separate mining groups that essentially controlled the largest labour force in South Africa. Their influence over state revenue, and political seats in the government allowed them to function with relative impunity. With a general monopoly over South Africa's agricultural and industrial products, the Transvaal Chamber of Mines was in effect capable of controlling workers wages and suppressing efforts to unionize. This was largely achieved by keeping workers in policed compounds and brutally restricting their ability to communicate or be contacted by union organizers.

In the wake of discontent following settlements that maintained the existing labour cost, Prime Minister Smuts issued War Measure NO. 1425 this measure which, " prohibiting gatherings of more than twenty persons on mining property without special permission," effectively ceased further organized trade union meetings.

Following the suppression of the 1946 strike, union groups like The Communist Party of South Africa experienced brutal treatment at the hands of the existing government. Many of the parties leaders were indicted on charges of sedition and treason. "This was followed by a systematic series of measures to destroy the CPSA, culminating in the suppression of Communism Act in 1950." (Communist University, COSATU, 1946 mineworkers strike, press release, Aug. 11, 2006). However, despite continual efforts through the media to define the strike as a failure this initial protest has had a lasting impact on South African politics. The formation and emergence of the National Union of Mineworkers (NUM) represents a direct lineage to these early union organizers. This organization, " arguably the heirs to the 1946 strike are currently engaged in a series of territorial disputes with the breakaway Association of Mineworkers and Construction Union (AMCU)."(Global Research, Aug. 21, 2012. Chris Webb).

Cheap labour has historically provided the back-bone for South Africa's thriving mining industry. Much of this work-force has routinely been composed of poor workers abducted from surrounding regions. " Research shows that by 1929, more than 115,000 Mozambicans had been forcibly recruited to work in South African mines." The increased foreign demand for platinum has only served to perpetuate this system of abuse and oppression. While the number of workers extracted from the surrounding areas has declined, local peasants are still routinely pressured into labour once they reach the working age. While many of the injustices imposed by South Africa's mining industry persist, the 1946 miners strike remains a prevalent reminder of the plight of African workers and their families.

== See also ==
- Marikana miners' strike in 2012
