= Polokwane Local Municipality elections =

The Polokwane Local Municipality is a Local Municipality in Limpopo, South Africa. The council consists of ninety members elected by mixed-member proportional representation. Forty-five councillors are elected by first-past-the-post voting in forty-five wards, while the remaining forty-five are chosen from party lists so that the total number of party representatives is proportional to the number of votes received. In the election of 1 November 2021 the African National Congress (ANC) won a majority of fifty-six seats.

== Results ==
The following table shows the composition of the council after past elections.

Event	ACDP	ANC	AZAPO	COPE	DA	EFF	FF+	PAC	UDM	Other	Total
2000 election	2	52	2	—	9	—	—	1	1	2	69
2006 election	2	58	1	—	7	—	1	1	1	2	73
2011 election	1	61	1	3	9	—	1	0	0	0	76
2016 election	0	52	0	1	10	26	1	0	0	0	90
2021 election	1	56	0	1	7	21	2	0	0	2	90

== December 2000 election ==
The following table shows the results of the 2000 election.

Party	Ward			List			Total seats
Party	Votes	%	Seats	Votes	%	Seats	Total seats
African National Congress	51,259	73.53	31	52,561	75.96	21	52
Democratic Alliance	9,618	13.80	3	9,300	13.44	6	9
Independent candidates	3,778	5.42	1				1
African Christian Democratic Party	1,933	2.77	0	1,786	2.58	2	2
Azanian People's Organisation	1,479	2.12	0	1,814	2.62	2	2
United Democratic Movement	752	1.08	0	1,457	2.11	1	1
Pan Africanist Congress of Azania	412	0.59	0	1,481	2.14	1	1
Alliansie Noord	479	0.69	0	800	1.16	1	1
Total	69,710	100.00	35	69,199	100.00	34	69
Valid votes	69,710	97.92		69,199	97.20		
Invalid/blank votes	1,482	2.08		1,993	2.80		
Total votes	71,192	100.00		71,192	100.00		
Registered voters/turnout	184,344	38.62		184,344	38.62		

== March 2006 election ==
The following table shows the results of the 2006 election.

Party	Ward			List			Total seats
Party	Votes	%	Seats	Votes	%	Seats	Total seats
African National Congress	63,063	75.38	33	66,722	79.58	25	58
Democratic Alliance	8,029	9.60	3	7,800	9.30	4	7
Independent candidates	5,499	6.57	1				1
African Christian Democratic Party	1,822	2.18	0	1,997	2.38	2	2
United Independent Front	1,679	2.01	0	1,859	2.22	1	1
Freedom Front Plus	1,296	1.55	0	1,470	1.75	1	1
Azanian People's Organisation	1,139	1.36	0	1,167	1.39	1	1
United Democratic Movement	348	0.42	0	1,394	1.66	1	1
Pan Africanist Congress of Azania	624	0.75	0	983	1.17	1	1
Alliance for Democracy and Prosperity	164	0.20	0	452	0.54	0	0
Total	83,663	100.00	37	83,844	100.00	36	73
Valid votes	83,663	98.34		83,844	97.18		
Invalid/blank votes	1,408	1.66		2,435	2.82		
Total votes	85,071	100.00		86,279	100.00		
Registered voters/turnout	217,472	39.12		217,472	39.67		

== May 2011 election ==
The following table shows the results of the 2011 election.

Party	Ward			List			Total seats
Party	Votes	%	Seats	Votes	%	Seats	Total seats
African National Congress	87,275	77.06	35	91,293	80.24	26	61
Democratic Alliance	12,651	11.17	3	13,008	11.43	6	9
Congress of the People	4,291	3.79	0	4,551	4.00	3	3
Independent candidates	3,644	3.22	0				0
African Christian Democratic Party	1,110	0.98	0	1,214	1.07	1	1
Azanian People's Organisation	987	0.87	0	1,134	1.00	1	1
Freedom Front Plus	1,075	0.95	0	856	0.75	1	1
Pan Africanist Congress of Azania	767	0.68	0	675	0.59	0	0
National Freedom Party	853	0.75	0	498	0.44	0	0
United Democratic Movement	608	0.54	0	545	0.48	0	0
Total	113,261	100.00	38	113,774	100.00	38	76
Valid votes	113,261	98.24		113,774	98.51		
Invalid/blank votes	2,034	1.76		1,723	1.49		
Total votes	115,295	100.00		115,497	100.00		
Registered voters/turnout	239,953	48.05		239,953	48.13		

== August 2016 election ==
The following table shows the results of the 2016 election.

Party	Ward			List			Total seats
Party	Votes	%	Seats	Votes	%	Seats	Total seats
African National Congress	92,434	57.13	40	92,549	57.20	12	52
Economic Freedom Fighters	45,463	28.10	1	45,838	28.33	25	26
Democratic Alliance	17,872	11.05	4	17,651	10.91	6	10
Freedom Front Plus	1,407	0.87	0	1,398	0.86	1	1
Congress of the People	933	0.58	0	831	0.51	1	1
African Christian Democratic Party	629	0.39	0	826	0.51	0	0
African People's Convention	258	0.16	0	836	0.52	0	0
Azanian People's Organisation	552	0.34	0	457	0.28	0	0
Independent candidates	867	0.54	0				0
Pan Africanist Congress of Azania	462	0.29	0	354	0.22	0	0
Forum for Service Delivery	354	0.22	0	338	0.21	0	0
United Democratic Movement	130	0.08	0	272	0.17	0	0
People's Revolutionary Movement	106	0.07	0	138	0.09	0	0
United Christian Democratic Party	101	0.06	0	132	0.08	0	0
African People's Socialist Party	127	0.08	0	91	0.06	0	0
Value Education Nationalism Democracy in Africa	115	0.07	0	83	0.05	0	0
Total	161,810	100.00	45	161,794	100.00	45	90
Valid votes	161,810	98.47		161,794	98.45		
Invalid/blank votes	2,519	1.53		2,541	1.55		
Total votes	164,329	100.00		164,335	100.00		
Registered voters/turnout	318,088	51.66		318,088	51.66		

== November 2021 election ==
The following table shows the results of the 2021 election.

Party	Ward			List			Total seats
Party	Votes	%	Seats	Votes	%	Seats	Total seats
African National Congress	81,589	58.31	37	85,887	61.86	19	56
Economic Freedom Fighters	30,844	22.04	4	32,943	23.73	17	21
Democratic Alliance	10,079	7.20	4	10,331	7.44	3	7
Independent candidates	9,218	6.59	0				0
Freedom Front Plus	2,618	1.87	0	2,592	1.87	2	2
African Christian Democratic Party	835	0.60	0	1,057	0.76	1	1
Abantu Batho Congress	661	0.47	0	593	0.43	1	1
Magoshi Swaranang Movement	397	0.28	0	563	0.41	1	1
Congress of the People	469	0.34	0	476	0.34	1	1
Patriotic Alliance	438	0.31	0	476	0.34	0	0
Pan Africanist Congress of Azania	325	0.23	0	512	0.37	0	0
Kingdom Covenant Democratic Party	157	0.11	0	566	0.41	0	0
Defenders of the People	322	0.23	0	353	0.25	0	0
Africa Restoration Alliance	255	0.18	0	381	0.27	0	0
Azanian People's Organisation	271	0.19	0	359	0.26	0	0
African People's Convention	324	0.23	0	278	0.20	0	0
African Transformation Movement	176	0.13	0	342	0.25	0	0
Movement for Total Liberation	222	0.16	0	232	0.17	0	0
United Democratic Movement	179	0.13	0	216	0.16	0	0
United Christian Democratic Party	201	0.14	0	161	0.12	0	0
Party of Action	162	0.12	0	197	0.14	0	0
Young Peoples Party	58	0.04	0	86	0.06	0	0
Democratic Artists Party	42	0.03	0	94	0.07	0	0
South African Royal Kingdoms Organization	52	0.04	0	74	0.05	0	0
Prophetic Movement Army	36	0.03	0	79	0.06	0	0
Total	139,930	100.00	45	138,848	100.00	45	90
Valid votes	139,930	98.59		138,848	98.17		
Invalid/blank votes	2,004	1.41		2,588	1.83		
Total votes	141,934	100.00		141,436	100.00		
Registered voters/turnout	326,617	43.46		326,617	43.30		

=== By-elections from November 2021 ===
The following by-elections were held to fill vacant ward seats in the period since the election in November 2021.

Date	Ward	Party of the previous councillor	Party of the newly elected councillor
25 Jan 2023	10	Economic Freedom Fighters	Economic Freedom Fighters
24 Apr 2024	10	Economic Freedom Fighters	African National Congress
13 Nov 2024	39	Democratic Alliance	Democratic Alliance
16 Jul 2025	13	Economic Freedom Fighters	Economic Freedom Fighters
25 Feb 2026	34	African National Congress	African National Congress

In the ward 10 by-election held on 25 January 2023 after the death of the previous Economic Freedom Fighters (EFF) councillor, the EFF candidate retained the seat for the party. ActionSA contested its first by-election in Limpopo, winning 10% of the vote.

After the resignation of the EFF councillor following his arrest for stealing weapons and ammunition from the South African Police Service Stock Theft Unit, another by-election was held. The ANC won the seat back, with 53% of the vote to the EFF's 43%. ActionSA dropped to 2%, while uMkhonto we Sizwe (MK) contested its first by-election in Limpopo, finishing fifth with 1%.

In July 2025, contesting ward 13, the South African Communist Party finished third on 1% of the vote in its first election since deciding to contest elections separately to the ANC.
