= Michael Sayers =

Irish poet and writer (1911–2010)

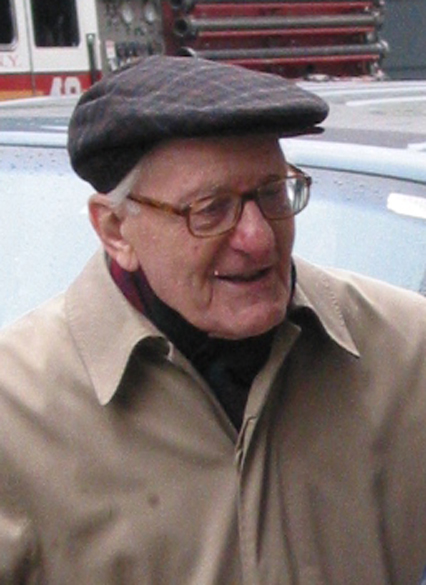
- Sayers in 2006
- Born: 19 December 1911; Dublin, Ireland
- Died: 2 May 2010 (aged 98); New York City, U.S.
- Education: Trinity College Dublin
- Occupations: Poet; writer; playwright; screenwriter
- Spouse(s): Mentana Galleani (first), Sylvia Thumin (second)
- Children: 3 children
- Writing career
- Language: English
- Period: 1930s–2000s
- Notable work: The Great Conspiracy: The Secret War Against Soviet Russia (1946)

Michael Sayers (19 December 1911 – 2 May 2010) was an Irish poet, playwright, writer and journalist whose books co-authored with Albert E. Kahn made him a target of US blacklisting during the McCarthyism era of the 1950s. He wrote scripts for TV in the 1950s, and as a screenwriter in the 1960s for movies including James Bond film Casino Royale.

== Background ==
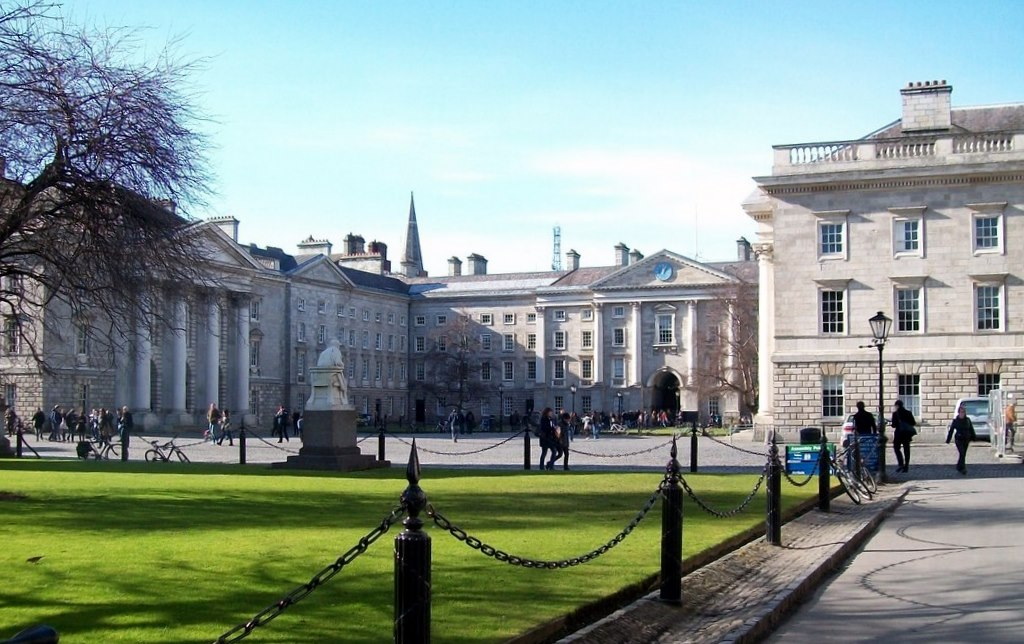
Sayers studied at Trinity College Dublin (here, Parliament Square circa 2010), where he learned French from Samuel Beckett.

Michael Sayers was born on 19 December 1911, in Dublin, Ireland, one of four children. His parents were Philip Sayers and Molly Harmel. His father, strongly committed to Irish Republicanism, was a friend of Michael Collins. Sayers went to school in Dublin and briefly at Cheltenham College in England. He studied briefly at London University and at Trinity College Dublin. At Trinity, he studied French under Samuel Beckett. At Micheál Mac Liammóir's Gate Theatre, he interacted with actors like Orson Welles and James Mason. He published poetry and wrote for the theater magazine Motley as well as College Miscellanyas. His cousin was the South African activist and journalist, Michael Harmel.

== Career ==
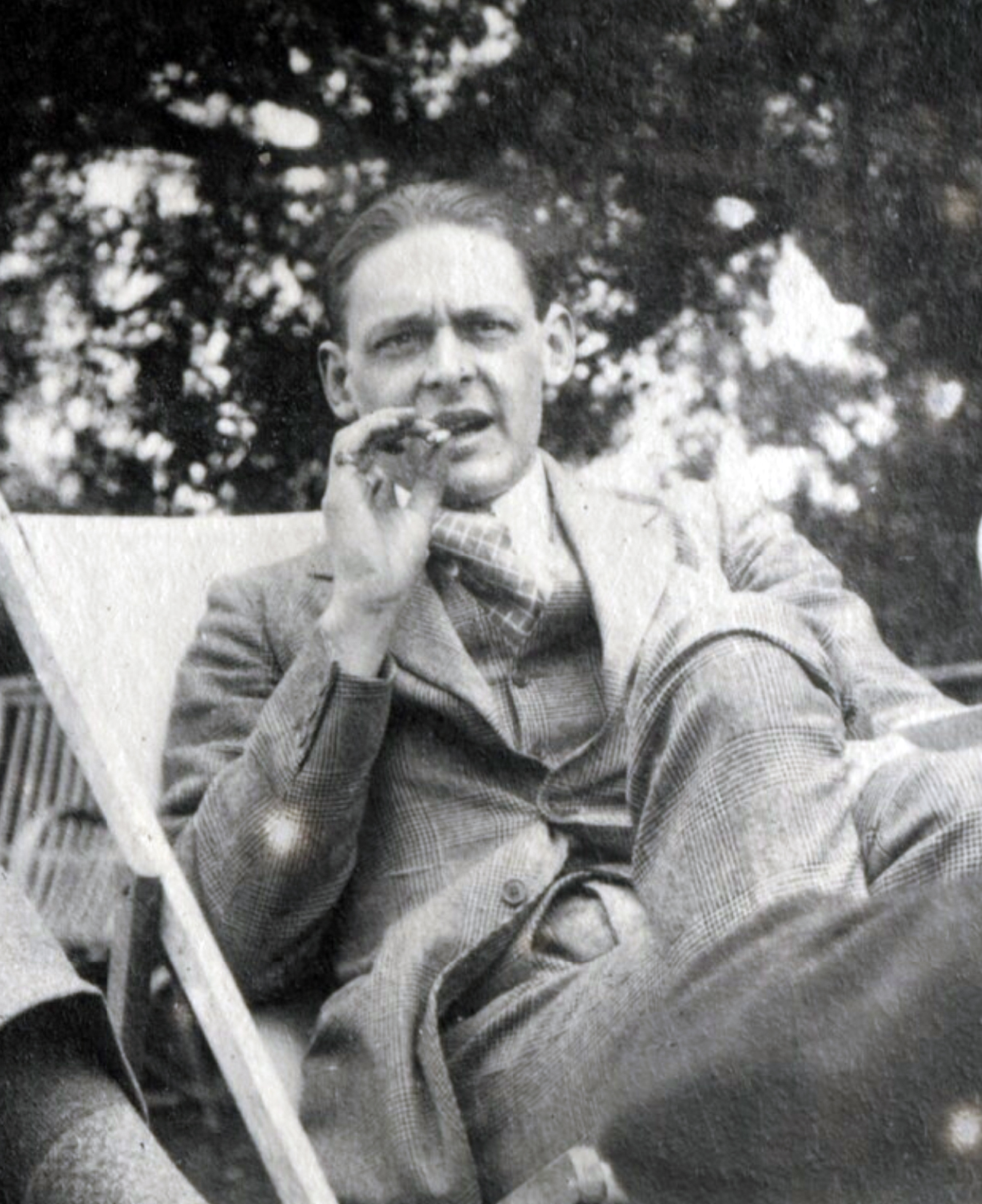
Sayers first worked for T. S. Eliot (here, 1923) at The Criterion as a theater reviewer

In the 1930s, age 18, Sayers first worked for T. S. Eliot, who made him a theater reviewer for The Criterion. A.R. Orage gave him the same role for The New English Weekly. Through A.R. Orage, Sayers wound up sharing a flat with fellow writers Rayner Heppenstall and Eric Blair ("George Orwell"). Sayers published stories in Edward J. O'Brien's annual Best British Short Stories.

In 1936, Sayers moved to New York City as dramaturge for Norman Bel Geddes. In 1939, Sayers worked for Friday (magazine) and investigated pro-Nazi activities (e.g., Henry Ford) in the United States. By 1942, he was working with Kahn for The Hour newsletter, also investigating Nazis. Together, Sayers and Kahn wrote three books: Sabotage!: The Secret War Against America (1942), The Plot Against the Peace: A Warning to the Nation! (1945), and The Great Conspiracy: The Secret War Against Soviet Russia (1946). Sayers claimed he was the first journalist to report on the newly liberated Nazi death camps – stories his Fortune (magazine) editor rejected the story as unbelievable.

In March 1944, Sayers published a four-part series of articles entitled "Rise of Anti-Semitic Fifth Column in Eire" in PM newspaper. The title of one article was "Truth About Nazi Espionage in Eire: Irish Terrorists Work Directly Under Hitler's Order." The Irish consul general in New York City and the government in Ireland exchanged worried messages. The Jewish Representative Council of Ireland became involved and had 14 representatives sign a document that declared, "No Irish Government has ever discriminated between Jew and Non-Jew." Fianna Fáil T.D. Robert Briscoe, Jewish, wrote to the same effect. Their statements appeared in Irish and Catholic newspapers in the USA. On 25 March 1944, PM responded, denying it had imputed the current Irish government but also asserting that anti-Semitism did exist in Ireland and that some people there supported the Nazis, e.g., the Irish Fascist Party. Later, documentary evidence showed that pro-Nazi, anti-Semitic sentiments did exist among some people in Ireland. Also, the German embassy did foster such sentiments. Further, there were connections between Father Charles Coughlin and the Christian Front in the US and a Father Denis Fahey of the Kimmage Manor seminary in Ireland. Exacerbating the cross-Atlantic concerns was that, in February 1944, the Irish government had published the contents of an "American Crisis Note," in which US Secretary of State Cordell Hull asked Ireland to expel German and Japanese government representatives.

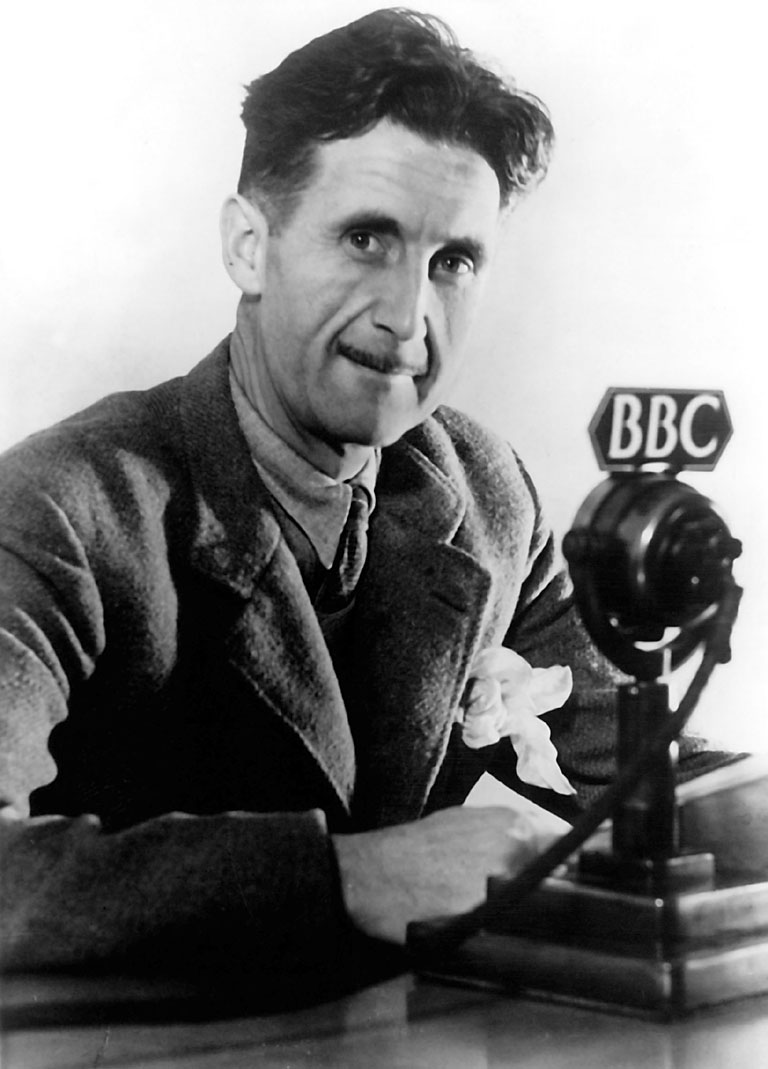
Sayers was a flatmate and friend of George Orwell (here, during WWII)

In mid-1945, Sayers returned to London, where he saw Orwell, who had just published Animal Farm. In the later 1940s, Sayers helped inaugurate live television by writing plays for NBC for stars like Rex Harrison and Boris Karloff.

In the 1950s, Sayers was blacklisted because of his left-wing sympathies. The renewal of his US passport was threatened. He reclaimed Irish citizenship and was helped to get an Irish passport by Irish writer and diplomat Conor Cruise O'Brien. Sayers seemed to escape anti-Communist efforts in theater (e.g., Maria Duce's Catholic Cinema and Theatre Patrons Association) when his play Kathleen ("a light romantic comedy") debuted in Dublin in the mid-1950s. In the 1950s he lived in France and, under the pseudonym "Michael Connor" he wrote plays for BBC television's Armchair Theatre. He also wrote drama series such as The Adventures of Robin Hood, William Tell, and Ivanhoe. He introduced Joseph Losey to Dirk Bogarde; Bogarde appeared in Losey films, e.g., The Servant and Accident.

In the 1960s, Sayers worked for Charles K. Feldman on the screenplays of Zorba the Greek and Hair, and wrote the final version of the screenplay of the James Bond film Casino Royale.

In the 1980s, Sayers moved to New York City to stay and spent the rest of his life writing poems and plays and teaching screenwriting until shortly before his death.

== Personal life and death ==
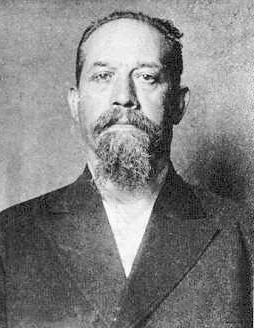
Sayers married Mentana Galleani, daughter of Italian anarchist Luigi Galleani.

In 1938, Sayers married Mentana Galleani, daughter of the militant Italian anarchist Luigi Galleani (whose followers included Sacco and Vanzetti). They had two sons. In 1955, they divorced. In 1957, Sayers married Sylvia Thumin (who died in 2006) and he adopted her son.

Sayers died age 98 on 2 May 2010, in New York.

== Legacy ==
At his death, the UK's The Independent wrote of him: "Sayers had a sharp political intelligence and spoke of his persecution in America with realism and resignation. He was a gentle, humorous man, who, like many gifted writers of his generation, paid the price for having the wrong opinions at the wrong time in the wrong place, and whose career never quite recovered from the set-back."

== Works ==
Books written with Alfred E. Kahn

- Sabotage! The Secret War Against America (1942, 1944)
  - Taĭnai︠a︡ voĭna protiv Ameriki (1947)
- The Plot Against the Peace: A Warning to the Nation! (1945)
- The Great Conspiracy: The Secret War Against Soviet Russia (1946)
  - Gran conspiración contra Rusia (1946, 1948)
  - Grote samenzwering (1946)
  - Groyse farshverung (1946)
  - Gran conspiración contra Rusia (1948)
  - Grande congiura (1948)
  - Wielki spisek przeciwko ZSRR (1948)
  - Velké spiknutí (1950)
  - Tālāqu śérā (1981)

Articles

- "Japan's Undercover Drive in America," Friday (14 February 1941)

Plays

- Kathleen (1955)
- Electra: the Legend (1997)
- The Neutrals (1998)
- Joan Saint Joan (1991)

Screenplays

- Casino Royale (1967 film)

Teleplays

- Der Spazierstock (1955)

== See also ==
- Albert E. Kahn
- T. S. Eliot
- George Orwell
