= Ntombi Shope =

South African politician (1950–2003)

Member of the National Assembly
- In office 9 May 1994 – 13 August 2003

Personal details
- Born: 15 April 1950 Tzaneen, Northern Transvaal; Union of South Africa
- Died: 13 August 2003 (aged 53)
- Party: African National Congress
- Relations: George Shope (brother); Sheila Sithole (sister); Lyndall Shope-Mafole (half-sister); Lenin Shope (half-brother); Thaninga Shope-Linney (half-sister)
- Parent: Mark Shope (father)

Ntombi Regan Shope (15 April 1950 – 13 August 2003) was a South African politician and former anti-apartheid activist who represented the African National Congress (ANC) in the National Assembly from 1994 until her death in August 2003. During apartheid, she was a member of the United Democratic Front in the Transvaal and served a three-year prison sentence for aiding the ANC.

== Early life and activism ==
Shope was born on 15 April 1950 in Tzaneen in the former Transvaal. Her father was trade unionist Mark Shope, a Treason Triallist who went into exile abroad after the ANC was banned in 1960; her sister, Sheila Sithole, was also an activist and ANC politician.

In the early 1980s, Shope was active in the anti-apartheid movement through the Azanian Students' Organisation, the Federation of South African Women, and the United Democratic Front. In 1984 to 1985, she was trialled in a high-profile criminal trial, in which she was charged and then convicted of being a member of the ANC, of recruiting for the ANC, of keeping a dead letter box for transmitting messages to activists abroad, and of possessing banned literature. In late January 1985, she was sentenced to three years' imprisonment. Her cousin, Emma Ntimbane, was also jailed for refusing to testify against her. At the Truth and Reconciliation Commission ten years later, a South African Police officer applied for amnesty for having tortured Shope in detention.

== Parliament: 1994–2003 ==
After the ANC was unbanned in 1990, Shope became active in the ANC Women's League, which Nelson Diale later described as "her political home". In South Africa's first post-apartheid elections in 1994, she was elected to represent the ANC in the National Assembly. She was re-elected in 1999. She died close to the end of her second term on 13 August 2003.
