= Federation of Non-European Trade Unions =

South African trade union federation

The Federation of Non-European Trade Unions was a trade union federation formed in South Africa in 1928.

Black workers were effectively excluded from the South African Trades Union Council, and FNETU was built with support from the South African Communist Party.

In 1928 it had about 15,000 members. It concentrated on economic issues and had some success until the great depression of 1930-33 affected the South African economy. It collapsed after splits in the South African Communist Party over the "black Republic" policy.

It had a significant impact on the organization of the Council of Non-European Trade Unions, a later group which successfully organized several strikes in the 1940s.
