= Pella, North West =

Pella Matlhako
- Location within North West (South African province) Location within South Africa
- Coordinates: 25.470°S 26.481°E
- Country: South Africa
- Province: North West
- District: Bojanala Platinum
- Municipality: Moses Kotane

Area
  - Total: 14.77 km^{2} (5.70 sq mi)

Population (2011)
  - Total: 9,223
  - Density: 624.4/km^{2} (1,617/sq mi)

Racial makeup (2011)
  - Black African: 99.5%
  - Indian/Asian: 0.2%
  - White: 0.1%
  - Other: 0.2%

First languages (2011)
  - Tswana: 93.3%
  - English: 3.0%
  - S. Ndebele: 1.1%
  - Other: 2.5%
- Time zone: UTC+2 (SAST)
- Postal code (street): 2890
- PO box: 2890
- Area code: 014

Pella is a town in Moses Kotane Local Municipality in the North West province of South Africa.
