= Sheila Weinberg =

South African anti-apartheid activist and politician

Sheila Weinberg (1 October 1945 - 11 November 2004) was a South African anti-apartheid activist and politician.

Born in Johannesburg, she was the daughter of Eli and Violet Weinberg who were both members of the ANC and the South African Communist Party. She was involved in politics from a young age and, when her parents were in detention, she was looked after by Helen Joseph.

== Anti-apartheid activist ==
Weinberg was detained in Johannesburg Fort prison for the first time in 1964 under the 90-day Detention Act. As she was only 19 years old, she was then the youngest South African to be detained under the Act. She was held for 65 days, but released without charge. She was subsequently charged and served a jail term for painting an ANC slogan on a building. She served her sentence in Barberton Prison and was released in 1966.

During the 1970s she was a member of the Human Rights Committee, but by 1976 most of the committee's members had been banned or detained and activities had stopped. In 1976 she was placed under a banning order that limited her to Johannesburg and confined her to her home at night, on weekends and during holidays. In 1977 she was accused of breaking the banning order with Jeanette Curtis and was then convicted of 'attending a pre-arranged social gathering'. She was sentenced to nine months' imprisonment, suspended for three years, and took this on appeal to the Supreme Court. The Court ruled in her favour and reduced the sentence, but upheld the conviction. In the 1980s she was a key member of the United Democratic Front in Johannesburg. She was also involved in the Transvaal branch of the Black Sash and the 5 Freedoms Forum.

She later testified at the Truth and Reconciliation Commission about the fire bombings and interference with vehicles that had taken place during this time against white activists such as herself.

== Political career ==
When the ANC was unbanned in 1991 she began working in its North East Johannesburg branch which was named after her father who had died in exile in Dar es Salaam in 1982. She belonged to The Coalition of Women for a Just Peace in Israel and Palestine and was involved in its vigils to protest violence in the Middle East in both Cape Town and Johannesburg in December 2001. She served as a member of the Gauteng Provincial Legislature from 1994 to 2004 and represented the constituency of Westonaria. She retired from active politics after the general election in April 2004.

== Death ==
She died on 11 November 2004 at the Linksfield Clinic in Johannesburg after suffering from a brain aneurysm. She was survived by her only son Mark Thabo Weinberg.
