= Moses Kotane =

South African politician and activist (1905-1978)

Moses Mauane Kotane

Secretary-General of the South African Communist Party
- In office 1933–1936
- Preceded by: J. B. Marks
- Succeeded by: Edwin Thabo Mofutsanyana
- In office 1939–1978
- Preceded by: Edwin Thabo Mofutsanyana
- Succeeded by: Moses Mabhida

Treasurer General of the African National Congress
- In office 1963–1968
- Succeeded by: J.B. Marks
- In office 1971–1973
- Preceded by: J. B. Marks
- Succeeded by: Thomas Nkobi

Personal details
- Born: August 9, 1905 Tamposstad, Transvaal
- Died: May 19, 1978 (aged 72) Moscow, Russian SFSR, Soviet Union
- Resting place: Novodevichy Cemetery, Moscow (originally); Pella, North West, South Africa (re-interred, 14 March 2015)
- Party: South African Communist Party; African National Congress
- Spouse(s): Sophie Human; Rebecca Selutle
- Children: 4 sons & 1 daughter (Bessie Dolly Khunwana)

Moses Mauane Kotane (9 August 1905 – 19 May 1978) was a South African politician and activist. Kotane was secretary general of the South African Communist Party from 1939 until his death in 1978.

== Biography ==
=== Early life ===
Kotane was born in Pella in Maphusumaneng Section, Transvaal (now North West) to a devout Christian family of Batswana origins. He received little formal schooling prior to entering the workforce. In 1922 at the age of 17, Kotane began his working in Krugersdorp, where he worked in various jobs including as a photographer's assistant, domestic servant, miner, and bakery worker.

=== Trade unionism and early party politics ===
In 1928, Kotane joined the African National Congress but left it, considering it weak and ineffectual. Later that year he joined the African Bakers Union, an affiliate of the new Federation of Non-European Trade Unions then being built by the SACP. Kotane joined SACP a year later in 1929, soon becoming a member of the party's politburo. In 1931, he became a full-time functionary of SACP. Within the Communist Party, Kotane worked on Umsebenzi, the party's newspaper. As a promising young party member, Kotane was sent to Moscow to study Marxism-Leninism at the International Lenin School. In Moscow, Kotane studied under Endre Sík, 1967 recipient of the Lenin Peace Prize and other Marxist theorists. Returning to South Africa in 1933, Kotane advanced through the Party until the point where he became the party's general secretary in 1939.

=== Political legacy ===
Kotane was a well-respected member of the struggle for majority rule in South Africa by even non-communist leaders. Walter Sisulu credited him as a "giant of the struggle" because of his logical and non-dogmatic approach. Kotane was also a leading member of the African National Congress at the same time as the SACP. With the African National Congress, Kotane served as Treasurer General from 1963 to 1973 when he was replaced by Thomas Nkobi. Kotane, representing the Communist Party, attended the 1955 Asian-African Conference in Bandung, Indonesia. From 1956 to 1961, Kotane was a defendant in the Treason Trial alongside fellow South African leaders Nelson Mandela, Joe Modise, Albert Luthuli, Joe Slovo, Walter Sisulu and 151 others. Despite years of prosecution, none of the defendants, including Kotane, were convicted.

=== Personal life and death ===
Kotane suffered a stroke in 1968. Following the stroke, he went for treatment in the Soviet Union, where he died on 19 May 1978. On 1 March 2015, Moses Kotane's remains were returned to South Africa together with the remains of J. B. Marks and he was reburied on 14 March at Pella, North West. Kotane was survived by his wife, Rebecca. She died in Soweto in January 2021 at the age of 108.

== Honours ==
Kotane was honoured with the Isitwalandwe Medal by the ANC in 1975. A local municipality is named after him in North West Province, South Africa. He was awarded the Order of Friendship of Peoples on 8 August 1975.

Order for Meritorious Service in gold (2003)

Party political offices
Preceded by J. B. Marks	General Secretary of the South African Communist Party; 1933–1936	Succeeded by Edwin Thabo Mofutsanyana
Preceded by Edwin Thabo Mofutsanyana	General Secretary of the South African Communist Party; 1939–1978	Succeeded by Moses Mabhida
