= National democratic revolution =

Type of event in Marxist–Leninist theory

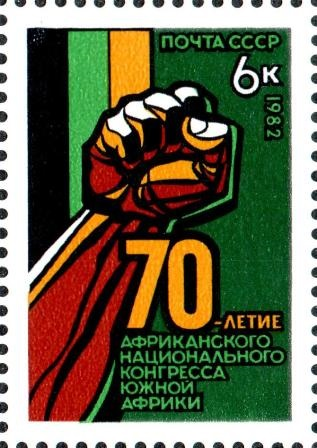
A commemorative Soviet stamp celebrating the 70th anniversary of the founding of the African National Congress (ANC). The ANC, the governing party of South Africa since 1994, has since 1969 been committed to leading a national democratic revolution.

A national democratic revolution is a specific type of revolution according to Marxist–Leninist national democratic theory. This purported revolution seeks to establish a state formation known as the national democratic state and, in certain cases, transform it into a communist state.

== National democratic revolution ==
According to academic Irina Filatova, the concept of national democracy suggested that recently formed independent nations could skip capitalism and directly create socialism, meaning establishing the socialist mode of production and a socialist state, in a two-stage process. The first stage was the national liberation struggle (synonymous at this point with the national democratic revolution), and the second stage was the initiation of socialist construction. Soviet theorists recognised that the material base in the colonial states was insufficiently developed, but they held the view that an advanced superstructure could be established in these states through a national democratic revolution. That superstructure could transform their countries into socialist states with the help of the communist bloc and the assistance of world proletarian forces. This, in turn, would level up the material base and hasten the construction of socialism in these states.

Karen Brutents believed that national democratic revolutions possessed unique characteristics that set them apart from prior revolutions. He thought that these revolutions contained an inherent anti-capitalist inclination that would eradicate both colonial and semi-colonial oppression. These revolutions would consequently undermine the imperialist structure led by the advanced capitalist states. At first, Brutents believed that when the national democratic revolution was led by political groups representing the interests of the working class, these revolutions would turn into socialist revolutions.

In cases where pro-proletarian forces or the proletariat did not lead the national democratic revolutions, Brutents argued that they could still weaken imperialism and feudalism and bring about anti-capitalist transformations, which would help transition to socialist construction. He theorised that the progressive and communist tendency of the national democratic revolution could gain the upper hand in the internal balance of revolutionary forces either at the first or second stage of the revolutionary process.

Brutents also believed that the national liberation struggles and the national democratic revolutions could alter the correlation of forces between capitalism and communism, and the Third World was the chief contest area between the two systems. He believed that, due to the course of the world revolutionary process, the need to work with national liberation movements and how formerly colonised states developed had changed. This shift was significant both in practical terms and in how people thought about it, especially compared to the early days of the Soviet state. He reasoned that in the past, the focus was mainly on protecting the first socialist revolution, meaning the Soviet Union, from imperialism. In the 1970s, the objective shifted to actively combating imperialism and global capitalism to eradicate both, Brutents believed.

The two-stage revolutionary process paradigm was attacked by Nodari Simoniya, a Soviet orientalist theorist from Georgia, in his 1975 book, Countries of the East: Roads of Development. In the book, Simoniya denied the national liberation struggle and the national democratic revolution a special character, simply referring to them as bourgeois revolutions. That meant he did not believe these revolutions had anything innate in them to produce socialism.

While thoroughly criticised in the press and within the party establishment, this debate produced a new understanding of the national democratic state and revolutionary democracy. In 1978, Semen Agaev and Inna Tatarovskaia wrote an article in the Soviet academic journal Asia and Africa that supported most of Simoniya's criticism, except the socialist potential of the non-capitalist path offered by the national democratic revolution and state. In their article, they tried to bridge the gap between those who considered national democracy as a bourgeoisie phenomenon and those who thought the national democratic state was a tool to establish socialism. Their key argument was to differentiate the national liberation struggle (national liberation revolution) from the national democratic revolution. They formulated three stages: the first stage was the national liberation struggle, the second stage was the national democratic revolution, and the last stage was the socialist revolution.

The distinguishing feature of the national liberation struggle, Agaev and Tatarovskaia reasoned, was the elimination of colonialism and the establishment of an independent state. This stage could be followed up by a national democratic revolution, which they created two sub-stages for. The first sub-stage instituted a general democratic transformation of society. This was akin to the lower stage of the national democratic state discussed earlier. The second sub-stage, similar to revolutionary democracy, saw socialists institute policies to create the material basis to construct socialism. The third and last stage, the socialist revolution, would see the building of socialism, they reasoned. In this schema, the national democratic revolution became an independent stage, and the national liberation struggle did not necessarily have to produce a national democratic revolution. For the states of socialist orientation, it was a transitory stage that needed to be passed to construct socialism.

=== National democratic fronts ===
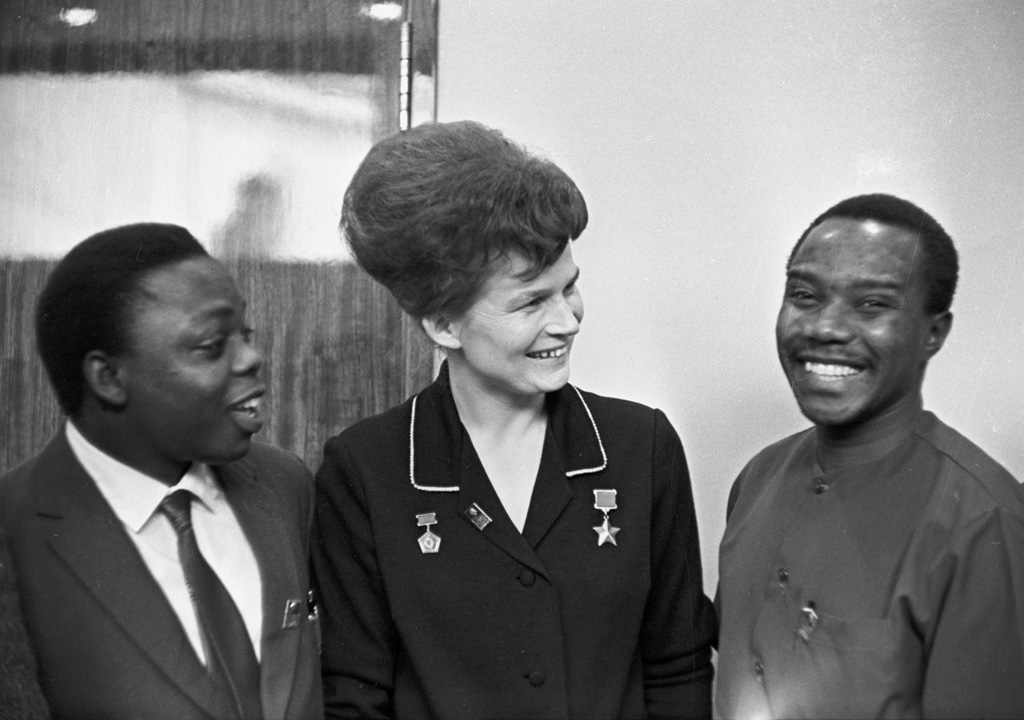
A picture of Valentina Tereshkova with a visiting delegation of the Tanganyika African National Union (TANU) to the 23rd CPSU Congress, held in 1966. TANU was considered to be a national democratic party by the Soviets.

The 1960 Moscow conference called for communists in the "majority of countries" to establish national democratic fronts to unite progressive forces in a common coalition. The idea is that the national democratic fronts would, similar to the united front and popular front policies of the 1930s and 1940s, play a key role in the establishment of a national democratic state. The main aim of the national democratic front was to unite the "national bourgeoisie, the petty urban bourgeoisie, and the democratic intelligentsia" with the proletariat in a common progressive struggle. The main intention of the strategy was to harness nationalism for communist ends. Having broadened their social base thanks to the fronts, the communist parties in question, it was believed, could use the national democratic fronts as a basis to take power. In the meantime, the communist parties were to push the national democrats in a pro-communist direction and promote communist policies.

While this was relevant for some states, in states without a communist party, the Soviets usually designated the largest socialist party as a "national democratic party." The Soviets treated these parties well and invited them to attend the CPSU party congresses and other notable events. Direct relationships were also established, such as with the CPSU and Mali's Sudanese Union – African Democratic Rally on 19 September 1962.
