= South African Communist Party =

Political party in South Africa

- Chairperson: Blade Nzimande
- General Secretary: Solly Afrika Mapaila
- First Deputy General Secretary: Madala Masuku
- Second Deputy General Secretary: David Masondo
- Founded: 12 February 1921; 105 years ago
- Preceded by: International Socialist League
- Headquarters: 4th Floor; Cosatu House; 110 Jorissen Street; Johannesburg; Gauteng
- Newspaper: Umsebenzi
- Youth wing: Young Communist League of South Africa
- Membership (2015): ▲220,000
- Ideology: Communism; Marxism–Leninism
- Political position: Left-wing; Historical: Far-left
- National affiliation: Tripartite Alliance
- International affiliation: IMCWP
- Regional affiliation: Africa Left Networking Forum
- Colours: Red; Black; Yellow
- Local government council seats: 271 / 10,526

Party flag

Website
- www.sacp.org.za

The South African Communist Party (SACP) is a Marxist-Leninist political party in South Africa.

It was founded on 12 February 1921 as the Communist Party of South Africa (CPSA), and tactically dissolved itself in 1950 in the face of being declared illegal by the governing National Party under the Suppression of Communism Act, 1950. The Communist Party was reconstituted underground and re-launched as the SACP in 1953, participating in the struggle to end the apartheid system. It is a member of the ruling Tripartite Alliance alongside the African National Congress and the Congress of South African Trade Unions (COSATU) and through this it influences the South African government.

The party's Central Committee is the party's highest decision-making structure. Although the party has not left the Tripartite Alliance, the SACP has announced its intention to break with the ANC and run its own candidates in the 2026 local elections, following the ANC's decision to enter a unity government with what it called "right-wing parties".

== History ==
The Communist Party of South Africa was founded in 1921 by the joining of the International Socialist League and others under the leadership of William H. Andrews. It first came to prominence during the Rand Rebellion, a strike by white miners in 1922. The large mining concerns, facing labour shortages and wage pressures, had announced their intention of engaging blacks in semi-skilled and some higher-level jobs at low wage rates, compared to their white counterparts who enjoyed the monopoly of higher and well-paying occupations. The CPSA supported the strike as the struggle between the working class and the capitalist class, but it distanced itself from racist slogans associated with the strike. The party said in the statement a white South Africa was impossible, and all the workers had to organise and unite regardless of their race to fight for a non-racial South Africa and better conditions for all workers.

The party thus reoriented itself at its 1924 Party Congress towards organising black workers and "Africanising" the party. By 1928, 1,600 of the party's 1,750 members were black. In the same year, the Communist International adopted a resolution for the CPSA to adopt the "Native Republic" thesis, which stipulated that South Africa is a country belonging to the natives, that is, the Indigenous Black population, and that most of South Africa's revolutionary potential laid with them. The resolution was influenced by a delegation from South Africa. James la Guma, the party Chairperson from Cape Town, had met with the leadership of the Communist International.

Contemporary scholars have argued that the party dismissed competing attempts at multiracial revolutionary organisations during this period, especially multiracial union organising by the syndicalists, and used revisionist history to claim that the party and its Native Republic policy was the only viable route to African liberation. Despite this, in 1929 the party adopted a "strategic line" which held that, "The most direct line of advance to socialism runs through the mass struggle for majority rule". By 1948, the Communist Party had officially abandoned the Native Republic policy.

In 1946, the CPSA along with the African National Congress participated in the general strike that was started by the African Mine Workers' Strike in 1946. Many party members, such as Bram Fischer, were arrested.

=== Fight against apartheid ===
Aware that the National Party, elected to government in 1948, was about to ban the Communist Party, the CPSA decided by a majority to dissolve itself. A minority felt that the party should organise underground, but the majority apparently argued that this would be unnecessary, believing that support should be given to the African National Congress (ANC) in the drive to majority rule. After its voluntary dissolution, the CPSA was declared illegal in 1950. In 1953, a group of former CPSA members launched the South African Communist Party that remained — as had been the CPSA — aligned with the Soviet Union. The ban on the party was lifted in 1990 when the ANC and other anti-apartheid organisations and individuals were also unbanned, and African National Congress leader Nelson Mandela was released from prison.

The CPSA/SACP was a particular target of the governing National Party. The Suppression of Communism Act was used against all those dedicated to ending apartheid, but was obviously particularly targeted at the communists.

Following the dissolution and subsequent banning of the CPSA, former party members and, after 1953, members of the SACP adopted a policy of primarily working within the ANC in order to reorient that organisation's programme from a nationalist policy akin to the CPSA's former Native Republic policy towards a non-racial programme which declared that all ethnic groups residing in South Africa had equal rights to the country. While black members of the SACP were encouraged to join the ANC and seek leadership positions within that organisation, many of its white leading members formed the Congress of Democrats which in turn allied itself with the African National Congress and other "non-racial" congresses in the Congress Alliance on the basis of multi-racialism. The Congress Alliance committed itself to a democratic, non-racial South Africa where the "people shall govern" through the Freedom Charter. The Freedom Charter was adopted by the ANC, the SACP and other partners in the Alliance in accordance with its evolution. The Charter has since remained the cornerstone of the Alliance, as its basic, shared programme to advance a national democratic revolution, both a process of struggle and transformation to achieve a non-racial, non-sexist, democratic and prosperous South Africa.

The SACP played a role in the development of the Freedom Charter through its cadres who were openly active in the Congress Alliance and in the Party's underground organisation. In the same vein the Party played an important role in the evolution of the Alliance and the development of the liberation movement in South Africa.

As the National Party increased repression in response to increased black pressure and radicalism throughout the 1950's, the ANC, previously committed to non-violence, turned towards the question of force. A new generation of leaders, led by Nelson Mandela and Walter Sisulu recognised that the Nationalists were certain to ban the ANC and so make peaceful protest all but impossible.

They allied themselves with the communists to form Umkhonto we Sizwe ("Spear of the Nation") which began a campaign of terror by bombing civilian targets like shopping malls and restaurants. However the leaders of Umkhonto were soon arrested and jailed and the liberation movement was left weak and with an exiled leadership. Communist Joe Slovo was Chief of Staff of Umkhonto; his wife and fellow SACP cadre Ruth First was perhaps the leading theoretician of the revolutionary struggle the ANC were engaged in. The ANC itself, though, remained broadly social democratic in outlook.

In exile, communist nations provided the ANC with funding and firearms. Gradual work by the ANC slowly rebuilt the organisation inside South Africa, and the ANC was able to capitalise on the wave of anger amongst young South Africans during and after the Soweto uprising of 1976.

Eventually external pressures and internal ferment made even many strong supporters of apartheid recognise that change had to come and a long process of negotiations began which resulted, in 1994, in the defeat of the National Party after forty-six years of rule.

=== Post-apartheid ===
With victory a number of communists occupied prominent positions on the ANC benches in parliament. Most prominently, Nelson Mandela appointed Joe Slovo as Minister for Housing. This period also brought new strains in the ANC-SACP alliance when the ANC's programme did not threaten the existence of capitalism in South Africa and was heavily reliant on foreign investment and tourism. However, the Freedom Charter had been considered only as a blueprint for a future democratic and free South Africa. In his autobiography Long Walk to Freedom, Nelson Mandela famously remarked:

"The cynical have always suggested that the Communists were using us. But who is to say that we were not using them?"

After Mandela's death in 2013, the ANC confirmed that he had been a member of the SACP and served on its central committee.

On July 30, 2011 the SACP celebrated its 90th anniversary.

Through the Tripartite Alliance and the sitting of many SACP members on the ANC's NEC, the SACP has wielded influence from within the ANC, often serving as an ideological opposition against the presidency and socio-economic policies of Thabo Mbeki (1999–2008); this became most apparent with the ouster of Mbeki from the presidencies of both the party (2007, by vote) and the government (2008, by ANC party recall) and his eventual replacement in both offices with Jacob Zuma, who was widely seen as being more conciliatory to the ideological demands of both the SACP and COSATU.

Initially, the party did not contest elections under its own name. However, in December 2017, the party contested a number of local council by-elections in Metsimaholo Local Municipality in the Free State, failing to win any first-past-the-post ward seats, but gaining three proportional representation seats. In total the SACP received 3,270 votes (6,3%).

In his address to the 2015 Biennial National Conference of the South African Jewish Board of Deputies, South African President Jacob Zuma credited South African Jews for being "among the first to organise the South African working class" as some Jewish activists occupied leading positions within the Communist Party.

In December 2024, the party decided to contest local elections, including the upcoming 2026 South African municipal elections, under its own name.

In July 2025, the party received 1% of the vote in its first election following the decision, finishing third in Polokwane ward 13.

In 2026, the party also promoted the idea of convening the Conference of the Left, a proposed gathering of left-wing political parties, trade unions and social movements in South Africa ahead of the 2026 local government elections.

== General secretaries ==
1921: William H. Andrews
1925: Jimmy Shields
1929: Douglas Wolton
1929: Albert Nzula
1932: J. B. Marks
1933: Moses Kotane
1936: Edwin Thabo Mofutsanyana
1938: Moses Kotane
1978: Moses Mabhida
1984: Joe Slovo
1991: Chris Hani
1993: Charles Nqakula
1998: Blade Nzimande
2022: Solly Afrika Mapaila

== National chairperson ==
1921: William H. Andrews
1925: Sidney Bunting
1931: Douglas Wolton
1933: Lazar Bach
1935: Issie Wolfson
1939: William H. Andrews
1953: Bram Fischer
2007: Gwede Mantashe
2017: Senzeni Zokwana
2022: Blade Nzimande

== Prominent members of the Central Committee of the SACP ==
- Michael Harmel
- Moses Kotane
- J. B. Marks
- Bram Fischer
- Jeremy Cronin
- Ruth First
- Chris Hani
- Ronnie Kasrils
- David Ivon Jones
- Mac Maharaj
- Nelson Mandela
- Govan Mbeki
- Thabo Mbeki
- Raymond Mhlaba
- Joe Slovo
- Yusuf Dadoo
- Blade Nzimande
- Sechaba "Charles" Setsubi
- Rob Davies
- George Mashamba
- Mfengu Makhalima
- Brian Bunting
- Kay Moonsamy
- John Nkadimeng
- Esther Barsel
- Charles Nqakula
- Judy Malqueeny
- Thenjiwe Mtintso
- John Gomomo

== Veterans' category ==
- Sydney Mufamadi
- Charles Nqakula
- Essop Pahad
- David Niddrie
- David Ivon Jones – founding member of the South African Communist Party

== See also ==
- List of communist parties
- African Communist
- Central Committee of the South African Communist Party

== Literature ==
- Adams, Simon (2001). Comrade Minister: The South African Communist Party and the Transition from Apartheid to Democracy. Nova Science Publishers.
- Adams, Simon (1997). "What's left?: The South African communist party after apartheid". Review of African Political Economy. 24 (72). doi:10.1080/03056249708704255. ISSN 0305-6244.
- Davidson, Appollon; Filatova, Irina; Gorodnov, Valentin; Johns, Sheridan, eds. (2003). South Africa and the Communist International: A Documentary History. Vol. 1: Socialist Pilgrims to Bolshevik Footsoldiers, 1919–1930. Frank Cass.
- Davidson, Appollon; Filatova, Irina; Gorodnov, Valentin; Johns, Sheridan, eds. (2003). South Africa and the Communist International: A Documentary History. Vol. 2: Bolshevik Footsoldiers to Victims of Bolshevisation, 1931–1939. Frank Cass.
- Johns, Sheridan (Fall 2007). "Invisible Resurrection: The Recreation of a Communist Party in South Africa in the 1950's" (PDF). African Studies Quarterly. 9 (4): 7–24.
- Johns, Sheridan (1995). Raising the Red Flag: The International Socialist League and the Communist Party of South Africa, 1914-1932. Mayibuye History and Literature Series No. 49. Mayibuye Books.
- Johns, Sheridan (1976). "The Birth of the Communist Party of South Africa". The International Journal of African Historical Studies. 9 (3): 371–400. doi:10.2307/216844. ISSN 0361-7882. JSTOR 216844.
- Lodge, Tom (2024). Red Road to Freedom: A History of the South African Communist Party 1921 - 2021. Boydell & Brewer, Limited.
- Roux, Edward (1964). Time Longer than Rope: a History of the Black Man's Struggle for Freedom in South Africa (2nd ed.). Madison, Wis: Univ. of Wisconsin Press.
- Thomas, David P. (2007). "The South African Communist Party (SACP) in the Post–apartheid Period". Review of African Political Economy. 34 (111). doi:10.1080/03056240701340456. ISSN 0305-6244.
