= South African Trades and Labour Council =

South African trade union federation

The South African Trades and Labour Council (SAT&LC) was a national trade union federation in South Africa.

== History ==
The federation was founded in 1930, when the South African Trades Union Council merged with the Cape Federation of Labour Unions. The federation was broadly split between the craft unions and mining unions, which generally only admitted white workers and took conservative positions; and a growing number of industrial unions, which admitted white, Asian and "coloured" members, and often worked closely with unions representing black workers.

In 1944, the federation adopted the Workers' Charter, which aimed to bring about a socialist government. In 1947, some unions of white workers resigned in opposition to the SAT&LC admitting black workers, and they formed the pro-apartheid Co-ordinating Council of South African Trade Unions. A further group of right-wing craft unions left in 1951 to form the South African Federation of Trade Unions.

In 1950, the Government of South Africa introduced the Suppression of Communism Act, which made it extremely difficult to maintain unions open to both black and white workers. The SAT&LC became increasingly divided, with some unions supporting the liberation of black workers, reform of the federation's discriminatory constitution, and the formation of local committees to organise all workers. Other unions, principally those craft unions already restricted to white workers, opposed these ideas. In 1954, they walked out of the federation's congress, and founded the new Trade Union Council of South Africa (TUCSA), which did not accept black workers.

Nineteen SAT&LC affiliates refused to join the TUCSA, and instead former a Trade Union Co-ordinating Committee. In 1955, this merged with the Council of Non-European Trade Unions, to form the South African Congress of Trade Unions.

== Affiliates ==
The following unions were affiliated in 1947:

Union	Abbreviation	Founded	Membership (1947)
African Cement Workers' Union			147
African Commercial and Distributive Workers' Union			375
African Sweet Workers' Union		1937	325
Agricultural Workers' Federation			1,057
Amalgamated Bricklayers' Trade Union of South Africa			1,225
Amalgamated Engineering Union	AEU	1893	7,608
Amalgamated Society of Woodworkers	ASW	1881	3,793
Brewery Employees' Union		1929	225
Building Workers' Industrial Union	BWIU	1916	7,334
Cape Explosive Industrial Workers' Union		1927	225
Cape Furniture Workers' Union			1,250
Cape Meat Trade Employees' Union			199
Cape Mineral Water Workers' Union			138
Cape Plywood Workers' Industrial Union			135
Cape Saw Mill Workers' Union			150
Cape Town Gas Workers' Union			60
Cape Town Lift Operators' Union			11
Cape Western District Bespoke Tailors' Union			300
Chemical and Allied Workers' Union			259
Chemical Workers' Union		1943	180
Concession Stores and Allied Trades Assistants' Union		1926	668
Durban Indian Municipal Employees' Society	DIMES	1936	1,801
Durban Municipal Transport Employees' Union		1926	500
East London and Border Furniture Workers' Union			145
East London Transport Workers' Union			84
Explosive and Fertiliser Workers' Union			750
Food and Canning Workers' Union	FCWU	1941	2,025
Food, Canning and Allied Workers' Union			540
Furniture Workers' Industrial Union (Natal)		1930	807
Furniture Workers' Industrial Union (Transvaal)	FWIU	1925	1,610
Garment Workers' Industrial Union	GWIU	1934	2,180
Garment Workers' Union	GWUSA	1909	11,870
General Building Workers' Union			135
Glass Workers' Union	GWU	1943	359
Glass Manufacturing Workers' Union			56
Hotel, Bar and Catering Trade Employees' Union	HB&CTEA		1,050
Iron Moulders' Society of South Africa	IMS	1896	1,182
Jewellers' and Goldsmiths' Society	J&G	1939	180
Johannesburg Municipal Transport Workers' Union	JMTWU	1935	1,750
Match Workers' Union		1944	93
Match Workers' Industrial Union			150
Mineral Water Workers' Union		1944	75
Motor Industry Employees' Union	MIEU	1939	4,753
Natal Liquor and Catering Trade Employees' Union	NL&CTEU	1928	875
Natal Sugar Industry Employees' Union		1938	887
National Baking Industrial Union		1927	354
National Union of Laundering, Cleaning and Dyeing Workers	NULCDW	1940	575
National Union of Commercial Travellers		1937	1,274
National Union of Distributive Workers	NUDW	1936	7,420
Oil and Petrol Employees' Union			944
Operative Plasterers' Trade Union of South Africa			248
Optical Workers' Union			59
Picture Framing Workers' Industrial Union			9
Port Elizabeth Non-European Municipal Workers' Union			193
Port Elizabeth Tram and Bus Workers' Union		1930	329
Pretoria Liquor and Catering Trade Employees' Union		1925	160
Pretoria Municipal Tram and Bus Workers' Union		1942	329
Pretoria Retail Meat Trade Employees' Union			92
Public Service and Provincial Council Workers' Union			796
Rope and Mat Workers' Industrial Union		1937	177
Shoe and Leather Repairer Workers' Union (Cape)			97
Shoe and Leather Repairer Workers' Union (Port Elizabeth)			27
South African Association of Municipal Employees	SAAME	1919	7,519
South African Boilermakers' Society	SABS	1916	2,501
South African Canvas and Rope Workers' Union	SAC&RWU	1926	180
South African Canvas and Rope Workers' Union (Cape)			35
South African Electrical Workers' Association	SAEWA	1939	3,784
South African Engine Drivers' and Firemen's Association	SAED&FA	1894	2,616
South African Hairdressers' Employees' Industrial Union	SAHEIU	1944	1,788
South African Iron and Steel Trades Association	ISTA	1936	1,788
South African Mine Workers' Union	MWU	1902	17,500
South African Reduction Workers' Association	SARWA	1924	2,500
South African Society of Bank Officials	SASBO	1916	5,300
South African Tin Workers' Union	SATWU	1939	1,843
South African Typographical Union	SATU	1898	7,088
Sweet Workers' Union	SWU	1926	1,843
Tailoring Workers' Industrial Union		1934	725
Tea, Coffee and Chicory Industry Employees' Union		1943	94
Tea, Coffee and Chicory Industry Employees' Union (Cape)			67
Textile Workers' Industrial Union	TWIU	1935	1,625
Timber Workers' Union			75
Tin Workers' Union			263
Tobacco Workers' Union		1928	1,005
Tramway and Omnibus Workers' Union	TOWU		933
Transvaal Explosives and Chemical Workers' Union		1925	480
Transvaal Leather and Allied Trades Industrial Union	TL&ATIU	1928	1,651
Transvaal Retail Meat Trade Employees' Union		1938	410
Trawler and Line Fishermen's Union			175
Twine and Bag Workers' Union		1942	113
Umbogintwini Industrial Workers' Union			72
Wholesale Meat Factory and Cold Storage Workers' Industrial Union			58
Witwatersrand Banking Employees' Association		1934	420
Witwatersrand Liquor and Catering Trade Employees' Union	Wit Liquor	1926	370
Witwatersrand Taxi Drivers' Union		1941	97
Witwatersrand Tea Room, Restaurant and Catering Trade Employees' Union		1930	994

== General Secretaries ==
1930: William H. Andrews
1932: Alexander Gordon Forsyth
1937: Willie de Vries
1948: Alexander Gordon Forsyth
1951: Harry Boyder and Dulcie Hartwell
1953: Dulcie Hartwell
