= South African Congress of Trade Unions =

Former federation of trade unions

The South African Congress of Trade Unions (SACTU) was a national trade union federation in South Africa.

== History ==
The federation was established in March 1955, after right wing unions dissolved the South African Trades and Labour Council in 1954 to form the exclusive white, coloured, and Indian workers' Trade Union Council of South Africa. It combined the unregistered African unions affiliated to the Council of Non-European Trade Unions with fourteen registered unions which refused to join the TUCSA. The South African Railways and Harbours Union and the Food and Canning Workers' Union were among the founder members. The Industrial Conciliation Act, 1956 banned the registration of multi-racial trade unions.

SACTU was explicitly political and was one of the founders of the Congress Alliance in 1955, and all African National Congress (ANC) members who were workers were required to join SACTU. The federation's first conference in 1956 proclaimed that the fights for economic and political rights were one and the same. It explicitly campaigned against the Native Labour (Settlement of Disputes) Act, 1953 and urged members to have nothing to do with the Native Labour Officials established by it. SACTU organised factory "cells" which studied Marxist ideology as well as organising techniques. However, it struggled to develop these into unions, as it lacked funds and trained organisers, and its offices were frequently raised by South African police, who removed organisational and financial records. Some existing unions, such as the National Union of Distributive Workers, refused to affiliate for fear that their organisations would be similarly compromised.

In 1956, vice president Lucy Mvubelo and some unions resigned in protest at the confederation's affiliation to the African National Congress and its close co-operation with the World Federation of Trade Unions. This group later established the small Federation of Free African Trade Unions of South Africa.

The organisation shared a building in Plein Street, Cape Town with the Food and Canning Workers' Union and other unions. A Transport National Organising Committee was established in May 1958.

SACTU organised a campaign for a national minimum wage of £1 (R2) a day in 1957 with the South African Railways and Harbours Union as a central focus. In 1961, it organised two major strikes in Durban, one at the Lion Match Company, and one at the King George V Hospital, which led to the formation of the Hospital Workers' Union. However, the actions were unsuccessful and proved isolated events. It also organised consumer boycotts, with the Bus Boycott of 1957 being the most successful. It produced a journal, called Workers' Unity.

In 1961 46 unions were affiliated, of which 36 were African. Their total membership was around 53,000 of which 39,000 were black and they had 63 paid organisers. In December 1962 the organisation was one of 36 organisations listed in a government proclamation under which 432 people were banned from holding office in any of those organisations, including 45 officials of SACTU and its affiliates. By 1965, the federation had largely ceased to operate in South Africa, although it continued to operate in exile, and to attempt to organise some clandestine action. It received some financial support from the International Transport Workers' Federation.

From 1973 there was a revival of industrial militancy. The government retaliated with violence and several hundred strikers were shot. But the Bantu Labour Relations Regulations Amendment Act in 1973 did permit some industrial activity within a restrictive framework of works committees. By 1976 there were about 40,000 African union members, but most were in unions not linked to SACTU, and there were disagreements over whether the SACTU model should be emulated or avoided.

John Taolo Gaetsewe was the last elected General Secretary. In 1990, the ANC was unbanned, and some activists argued that the Congress of South African Trade Unions (COSATU) should merge into SACTU. However, by this point, COSATU had a far larger membership and profile than SACTU ever had. Instead, before the end of the year, the federation dissolved itself, with its remaining members transferring to COSATU.

== Affiliates ==
As of 1962, the following unions were affiliated:

Union	Membership (1962)
African Food and Canning Workers' Union	9,565
African Tea and Coffee Workers' Union	100
African Textile Workers' Industrial Union	2,900
Cape African Commercial and Distributive Workers' Union	150
Cape Cement and Quarry Workers' Union	625
Cape South African Railways and Harbours Non-European Workers' Union	300
Cape Tin Workers' Union	150
Cape Town Hospital Workers' Union (African)	150
Cape Town Hospital Workers' Union (Mixed)	500
City and Town Council Workers' Union	100
Durban African Municipal Employees' Union	650
Durban Baking Workers' Union	150
Durban Biscuit Workers' Union	150
Durban Chemical Workers' Union	750
Durban General Workers' Union	5,000
Durban Hospital Workers' Union	500
Durban Indian Municipal Employees' Society	1,600
Durban Match Workers' Union	200
Durban Tin Workers' Union	500
Durban Tobacco Workers' Union	500
Farm, Plantation and Allied Workers' Union	300
Food and Canning Workers' Union	8,052
Furniture, Mattress and Bedding Workers' Industrial Union	600
Hamersdale Clothing Workers' Union	500
Kimberley African General Workers' Union	500
Laundering, Cleaning and Dyeing Workers' Union of South Africa	498
Natal Dairy Workers' Union	500
Natal Metal Workers' Union	600
Natal Rubber, Cable and Allied Workers' Union	350
Natal South African Railways and Harbours Non-European Workers' Union	3,500
Natal Twine and Bag Workers' Union	200
National Union of African Laundering, Cleaning and Dyeing Workers	1,502
Port Elizabeth General Workers' Union	510
Port Elizabeth Metal Workers' Union	200
Port Elizabeth South African Railways and Harbours Non-European Workers' Union	250
Port Elizabeth Transport Workers' Union	300
Shop and Office Workers' Union	750
Society of African Mineworkers	200
South African Canvas and Rope Workers' Union	42
South African Clothing Workers' Union	1,250
Tea and Coffee Workers' Union	250
Textile Workers' Industrial Union	2,700
Transvaal African Building Workers' Union	131
Transvaal Dairy Workers' Union	400
Transvaal Domestic Workers' Union	123
Transvaal General Workers' Union	400
Transvaal Glass Workers' Union	150
Transvaal Metal Workers' Union	2,000
Transvaal South African Railways and Harbours Non-European Workers' Union	500
Transvaal Tin Workers' Union	170
Transvaal Toy Workers' Union	120
