= South African Trades Union Congress =

South African trade union federation

The South African Trades Union Congress (TUC) was a national trade union federation in South Africa.

The council was established in 1924, as the South African Association of Employees' Organisations. It was founded at a special congress, held after the collapse of the South African Industrial Federation, which was called by the Minister of Labour, Frederic Creswell. All the affiliated unions were registered under the Industrial Conciliation Act 1924 and represented white workers. The federation was expected to be very moderate, but unexpectedly elected the leading communist Bill Andrews as its general secretary. As president, it elected Jimmy Briggs, a Labour Party Senator.

The unexpected radicalism of the federation led some long-established unions not to affiliate, while the Mine Workers' Union and South African Typographical Union soon resigned their membership. They were replaced by small industrial unions, many open to all workers. The federation also began working closely with the South African Federation of Non-European Trade Unions. In 1930, the federation merged with the Cape Federation of Labour Unions, forming the South African Trades and Labour Council.

== Affiliates ==
The federation's founding affiliates were:

Union	Abbreviation	Founded	Membership (1926)
Affiliated Plasterers' Trade Union of South Africa		1896	193
Amalgamated Building Trade Union of South Africa	ABTU		510
Amalgamated Engineering Union	AEU	1893	2,800
Amalgamated Society of Woodworkers	ASW	1881	2,600
Baking Employees' Association			330
Building Workers' Industrial Union	BWIU	1916	2,000
Johannesburg Tramwaymen's Union			700
Mineral Water Employees' Union			
Mine Workers' Union	MWU	1902	2,500
Natal Mine Workers' Union		1916	300
National Vehicle Builders' Union			250
South African Association of Municipal Employees	SAAME	1919	2,700
South African Boilermakers' Society	SABS	1916	800
South African Co-ordinated Employees' Association			
South African Engine Drivers' and Firemen's Association	SAED&FA	1894	1,230
South African Reduction Workers' Association	SARWA		920
South African Shop Assistants', Warehousemen's, Clerks' and Hairdressers' Association			870
South African Society of Bank Officials	SASBO	1916	3,800
South African Typographical Union	AATU	1898	3,700
Witwatersrand Tailors' Association		1909	1,000
Women Workers' General Union		1925	N/A
