= Federation of Unions of South Africa =

Trade union in South Africa

FEDUSA
- Federation of Unions of South Africa
- Founded: 1 April 1997
- Headquarters: Johannesburg, South Africa
- Location: South Africa
- Members: 556,000
- Key people: Godfrey Selamatsela, President; Riefdah Ajam, General Secretary; Martle Keyter, Deputy President
- Affiliations: ITUC
- Website: www.fedusa.org.za

The Federation of Unions of South Africa (FEDUSA) is the second largest national trade union center in South Africa.

== History ==
The federation was founded on 1 April 1997, when the Federation of South African Labour Unions merged with the Federation of Organisations Representing Civil Employees. Many affiliates of the Federation of Independent Trade Unions also joined. On founding, about 80% of its members were white-collar workers, and 70% were white.

The federation worked closely with the World Confederation of Labour, but did not affiliate. Instead, in 1998, it affiliated to the International Confederation of Free Trade Unions, and has continued membership of its successor, the International Trade Union Confederation (ITUC). In 2006, it began negotiating a merger with the rival National Council of Trade Unions. They formed an umbrella organisation, the South African Confederation of Trade Unions, in 2007, but it achieved little, and the two federations remained independent.

The federation has favoured negotiation over industrial action. In 2015, it advised its public sector affiliates to accept a pay rise lower than that offered, in order to reduce government expenditure. It has placed a strong focus on its union education programme. In 2019, its long-term general secretary was dismissed after being accused of corruption. By 2020, it claimed a membership of 700,000, although the ITUC quoted a figure of 500,000.

== Affiliates ==
=== Current affiliates ===
The following unions were listed as affiliates, as of 2021:

| Union | Abbreviation | Founded | Membership (2011) |
|---|---|---|---|
| Administrative, Library and Technical Staff Associates | ALTSA | | |
| Airline Pilots Association of South Africa | ALPA-SA | | 1,591 |
| Health & Other Services Personnel Trade Union of South Africa | HOSPERSA | 1994 | 64,742 |
| Hospitality Industry and Allied Workers' Union | HIAWU | 1929 | |
| Insurance and Banking Staff Association | IBSA | | 7,963 |
| Motor Industry Staff Association | MISA | 1949 | 30,039 |
| Motor Transport Workers' Union | MTWU | | |
| National Security and Unqualified Workers' Union | NASUWU | | 9,534 |
| National Union of Leather and Allied Workers | NULAW | 1926 | 7,824 |
| National Tertiary Education Union | NTEU | 2009 | |
| Public Servants' Association of South Africa | PSA | 1920 | |
| Professional Transport and Allied Workers' Union | PTAWU | 1980 | 17,600 |
| South African Communication Union | SACU | 1994 | 5,136 |
| South African Parastatal and Tertiary Institutions Union | SAPTU | 2008 | |
| South African Typographical Union | SATU | 1898 | 11,344 |
| Suid-Afrikaanse Onderwysers Unie | SAOU | 1997 | 32,029 |
| Tertiary Education National Union of South Africa | TENUSA | 2005 | |
| United Association of South Africa | UASA | 1998 | 74,138 |
| United National Public Servants Association of South Africa and Allied Workers Union | UNIPSAWU | 1998 | |
| United National Transport Union | UNTU | 2012 | N/A |

=== Former affiliates ===
| Union | Abbreviation | Founded | Left | Reason not affiliated | Membership (1999) |
|---|---|---|---|---|---|
| Administrative, Technical and Electronic Association of South Africa | ATEASA | 1996 | 1998 | Merged into UASA | N/A |
| Care Centre, Catering, Retail and Allied Workers' Union | CCRAWUSA | | | | |
| Construction and Engineering Industrial Workers' Union | CEIWU | | | | |
| Eskom Employees' Association | EEA | | 2010 | Dissolved | N/A |
| Food and General Workers' Union | F&G | | | | 1,912 |
| Hairdressers' and Cosmetologists' Trade Union | | | 2000 | Merged into UASA | 5,591 |
| Independent Municipal & Allied Trade Union | IMATU | 1996 | | Disaffiliated | 66,657 |
| Independent Performing Arts Trade Union | IPATU | | | | 120 |
| Internal Staff Association | ITA | | | Merged into SAPTU | N/A |
| Jewellers' and Goldsmiths' Union | J&GU | 1939 | | | |
| Millennium Workers' Union | MWU | | | | |
| Mouth Peace Workers' Union | MPWU | 1997 | | | |
| National Democratic Change and Allied Workers' Union | NDCAWU | | | | |
| National Teachers' Union | NATU | | | | |
| National Union of Hotel, Restaurant, Catering, Commercial, Health and Allied Workers | NUHRCCHAW | | | | |
| National Union of Prosecutors of South Africa | NUPSA | | 2023 | Merged into PSA | 232 |
| Officials' Association of South Africa | OASA | 1918 | 1998 | Merged into UASA | N/A |
| Post and Telecom Association | P&T | 1902 | | | 6,358 |
| Professional Health Organisation of South Africa | PHOSA | | 2012 | Dissolved | |
| Public and Allied Workers' Union of South Africa | PAWUSA | 1967 | | Transferred to COSATU | 24,943 |
| SALSTAFF | SALSTAFF | 1918 | 2002 | Merged into UASA | 16,357 |
| South African Airways Flight Engineers' Association | SAAFEA | | 2009 | | 159 |
| South African Blindworkers' Organisation | SABWO | | | Disaffiliated | |
| South African Diamond Workers' Union | SADWU | | 2001 | Merged into UASA | 910 |
| South African Footplate Staff Association | SAFSA | 1905 | 2000 | Merged into UTATU | 10,000 |
| South African Independent and Allied Workers' Union | SAI&AWU | | 2004 | | |
| South African Railways and Harbours Union | SARWHU | 2001 | 2012 | Merged into UNTU | N/A |
| South African Telecommunications Association | SATA | | | | N/A |
| South African Workers' Union | SAWU | 1936 | 2001 | Transferred to Solidarity | 21,798 |
| Staff Association for the Motor and Related Industries | SAMRI | | 2001 | Merged into UASA | 1,333 |
| Sweet Workers' Union | SWU | 1925 | 2005 | Dissolved | N/A |
| Technical Workers' Union | TWU | 1924 | 2000 | Merged into UTATU | 11,118 |
| United Private Sector Workers' Union | UPSWU | | 2008 | | |
| United Transport and Allied Trade Union | UTATU | 2000 | 2012 | Merged into UNTU | N/A |
| Werknemers Unie van Suid-Afrika | WUSA | | | | |

== Leadership ==
=== General Secretaries ===
1997: Chez Milani
2006: Dennis George
2019: Riefdah Ajam

=== Presidents ===
1997: Mary Malete
2008: Danie Carstens
2011: Koos Bezuidenhout
2016: Godfrey Selematsela
