= Ray Budd =

South African trade union leader (1910-1974)

Raymond Francis Budd (9 June 1910 – 14 August 1974) was a South African trade union leader.

Born in the Mowbray area of Cape Town, Budd was educated at the Cape Technical College, before completing an apprenticeship at a railway workshop. In 1933, he joined the Amalgamated Engineering Union (AEU), soon becoming a shop steward, then the union's Cape Town district secretary. From 1946 to 1948, he served as president of the Cape Federation of Labour Unions, then in 1949, he began working full-time for the AEU as secretary of its South African Council.

In 1949 and 1950, Budd served as vice-president of the South African Trades and Labour Council. In 1954, he was a leading figure on the Unity Committee, which opposed government plans to prohibit trade unions including both white and "coloured" workers. The committee founded the Trade Union Council of South Africa (TUCSA), and Budd served on its executive, becoming president from 1959 to 1961.

In 1960, the South African AEU gained full independence from its British parent union, and Budd became its national chairperson. In 1966, under his leadership. the AEU resigned from TUCSA in protest at its plan to admit trade unions representing black workers.

Trade union offices
Preceded by ?	President of the Amalgamated Engineering Union of South Africa; 1949–1974	Succeeded by J. E. Faure
