= Cape Federation of Labour Unions =

Former South African trade union federation

The Cape Federation of Labour Unions (CFLU) was a trade union federation in South Africa.

The federation was founded in 1913. It aimed to represent all workers in the Cape Province, although most of its membership consisted of unions representing white and "coloured" workers. It initially only attracted three affiliates, including the Amalgamated Society of Carpenters and Joiners. It was initially led by secretary Joe Dean, who was replaced by Bob Stuart in 1914.

The federation grew significantly under Stuart's leadership, and it survived the start of the 1920s, when many other labour movement organisations collapsed. By 1926, the following unions were affiliated:

- Amalgamated Engineering Union of South Africa
- Building Trades' Union of the Eastern and Western Provinces
- Butchers' Employees' Union
- Cape Fishermen's Union
- Cape Motor Drivers' Association
- Cape Town and Camp's Bay Tramway Workers' Association
- Iron Moulders' Society of South Africa
- National Union of Furniture Workers
- National Union of the Leather Industry
- Operative Bakers' and Confectioners' Union
- South African Boilermakers' Society
- South African Operative Masons' Society
- South African Typographical Union

In 1930, it merged with the South African Trades Union Council, to form the South African Trades and Labour Council.
