= Federation of South African Labour Unions =

South African trade union federation

The Federation of South African Labour Unions (FEDSAL) was a national trade union federation in South Africa.

== History ==
The federation was established in 1959, as the Federation of Salaried Staff Associations, by four unions representing white-collar white workers:

- Electricity Supply Commission Salaried Staff Association
- Industrial Salaried Staff Association
- Mine Surface Chemicals Association
- South African Broadcasting Staff Association

The federation achieved little over the years, by 1985, its affiliates had changed to:

- Motor Industry Staff Association
- Nedbank Staff Association
- Underground Officials' Association
- Vereeniging van Gesalarieerde Nywerheidspersoneel

The dissolution of the Trade Union Council of South Africa in 1986 attracted new affiliates. It campaigned against the introduction of Value Added Tax, for a National Economic Forum, and to restructure the National Manpower Commission. It began admitting unions representing any workers, and in 1992 renamed itself as FEDSAL. By 1993, it had 13 affiliates, with a total of 204,176 members.

In 1997, the federation merged with the Federation of Organisations Representing Civil Employees, to form the Federation of Unions of South Africa (FEDUSA).

== Affiliates ==
Union	Abbreviation	Founded	Left	Reason not affiliated	Membership (1992)
ABSA Workers' Union	ABSAWU				8,500
Administrative, Technical and Electronic Association of South Africa	ATEASA	1996	1997	Transferred to FEDUSA	N/A
Airline Pilots' Association of South Africa	ALPA-SA		1997	Transferred to FEDUSA	N/A
Artisan Staff Association	ASA	1924	1997	Transferred to FEDUSA	15,500
Eskom Employees' Association	EEA		1997	Transferred to FEDUSA	6,000
Financial Institution Workers' Union	FIWU		1994	Merged into SASBO	13,000
Hospital Personnel Association of South Africa	HOSPERSA	1994	1997	Transferred to FEDUSA	40,714
Independent Municipal and Allied Trade Union	IMATU	1996	1997	Transferred to FEDUSA	N/A
Independent Performing Arts Trade Union	IPATU		1997	Transferred to FEDUSA	N/A
Industrial Salaried Staff Association	ISSA		1997	Transferred to FEDUSA	4,000
Motor Industry Staff Association	MISA	1949	1997	Transferred to FEDUSA	20,000
Nedcor Staff Society	NEDSTAFF				6,000
Post and TELEKOM Association	P&T		1997	Transferred to FEDUSA	12,673
Professional Health Organisation of South Africa	PHOSA		1997	Transferred to FEDUSA	N/A
Public and Allied Workers Union of South Africa	PAWUSA	1967	1997	Transferred to FEDUSA	N/A
Public Servants Association of South Africa	PSA	1920	1997	Transferred to FEDUSA	N/A
Salaried Staff Association	SALSTAFF	1918	1997	Transferred to FEDUSA	16,000
South African Airways Flight Engineers' Association	SAAFEA		1997	Transferred to FEDUSA	N/A
South African Association of Municipal Employees	SAAME	1919	1996	Merged into IMATU	50,000
South African Broadcasting Staff Association	SABSA				1,612
South African Footplate Staff Association	SAFSA	1905	1997	Transferred to FEDUSA	8,500
South African Hairdressers' Employees' Industrial Union	SAHEIU	1944	1997	Transferred to FEDUSA	7,500
South African Society of Bank Officials	SASBO	1916	1995	Transferred to COSATU	42,000
South African Teachers' Union	SAOU	1905	1997	Transferred to FEDUSA	N/A
Underground Officials' Association	UOA	1919	1997	Transferred to FEDUSA	21,000
UNISA Administrative and Professional Staff Union					809
