= Natal Labour Party =

The Natal Labour Party (NLP) was a social democratic political party in the Natal Colony.

At the 1906 Natal general election, four candidates from the labour movement were elected, nominated by the Durban Workers' Political Union or the General Workers' Political Association of Pietermaritzburg. This success inspired the establishment of a single party representing white workers across the colony.

The party was formed early in 1907. Nelson Pond Palmer became the group's parliamentary leader, and MPs Charles Henry Haggar and John Connolly also joining. Its president was A. L. Clark, while its secretary was J. White, and its treasurer was Joseph Edwards. In 1908, Edwards moved to become secretary, L. M. Sanderson became treasurer, and Haggar was employed as a full-time organising secretary. In 1909, Sanderson was succeeded by T. W. Marshman. The new party began publishing the weekly South African Tribune newspaper.

By 1908, all the local trade unions representing white workers had affiliated, with the exception of the Amalgamated Society of Carpenters and Joiners. Like the unions, the new party was strongly anti-Asian and advocated the restriction of suffrage to white voters. However, a section of the party led by Connolly moderated their views following a speaking tour by British socialist Keir Hardie. On other issues, the party adopted broadly socialist views, and it advocated women's suffrage.

By 1909, the party was in discussions to form a South African Labour Party (SALP), to coincide with the anticipated creation of the Union of South Africa. However, decisions over who the party would sponsor to stand in the 1910 South African general election proved highly controversial. Both the Journeyman Tailors' Society and the Amalgamated Society of Engineers disaffiliated from the party in protest, leaving the Durban Workers' Political Association and the South African Typographical Union as its leading forces. Harry Norrie was suspended from the party, and Connolly decided to distance himself from it. Haggar moved to the Rand, and Edwards, Clark and Marshman all moved away from political involvement.

The party became part of the new SALP at the start of 1910. While its anti-Asian positions featured in the new party's constitution, following the defections, it lacked strength in Natal.
