= South African Federation of Trade Unions (1951) =

South African trade union federation

The South African Federation of Trade Unions (SAFTU) was a national trade union federation of workers representing workers in South Africa.

The federation was founded in 1951, as a split from the South African Trades and Labour Council by right-wing unions which accepted apartheid and did not approve of black workers being given a role in governing trade unions. Some of the unions which split away were restricted to white workers, while others accepted "coloured" or Asian members, but none admitted black workers.

The unions with a mixed membership, such as the South African Typographical Union, soon left to join the new Trade Union Council of South Africa, which similarly did not admit black workers. In 1957, the federation affiliated to the South African Confederation of Labour (SACOL). By 1962, it had 11 affiliates, with a total of 66,263 members. As SACOL became more centralised, SAFTU declined in importance, and it appears to have dissolved around 1980.

Union	Membership (1962)
Artisan Staff Association	16,611
Cape Explosives Industrial Workers' Union	486
Mine Workers' Union	17,500
Natal Aluminium Workers' Union	
National Association of Furniture and Allied Industries	1,516
National Baking Industrial Union	
Netherlands Bank of South Africa Staff Society	
South African Actors' Equity Association	
South African Airways Engineering Association	740
South African Association of Municipal Employees	18,070
South African Engine Drivers' and Firemen's Association	4,538
South African Jockeys' Association	60
South African Reduction Workers' Association	3,300
South African Teleprinter Operators' Society	270
Transvaal Explosives and Chemical Workers' Union	600
Transvaal Retail Meat Trade Employees' Union	980
