= Ben Caddy =

South African trade unionist (1881–1955)

Benjamin Jennings Caddy (November 1881 – 13 March 1955) was an Australian-born South African trade unionist.

Born in Ballarat, Australia,Caddy emigrated to South Africa in 1898. Soon after, he fought on the British side during the Second Boer War. Following the war, he worked as a boilermaker and joined the UK-based United Society of Boilermakers in 1904. He gained prominent during the 1913 and 1914 strikes and played akey role in founding the South African Boilermakers' Society (SABS) in 1916. He served as the union's general secretary from 1920 to 1950.

In 1919, Caddy participated in a workers' takeover of Johannesburg's municipal services, attempting to manage them independently. He was also a notable figure in the 1922 Rand Rebellion, for which he was briefly imprisoned. In 1929, he attended the International Labour Organization conference in Geneva, as an advisor to Bill Andrews. Caddy helped establish the Mining Unions Joint Committee, serving as its chaired the South African Trade Union Building Society. Additionally, he was vice-chair of the South African Trade Union Assurance Society.

During World War II, Caddy supported South African involvement, serving on the Munitions Production Committee and the Manpower Control Board. In 1954, he was instrumental in founding the Trade Union Council of South Africa, and was named its life president. For his contributions, he was awarded the Coronation Medal in 1953.
