= Sweet Workers' Union =

Trade union in South Africa

The Sweet Workers' Union (SWU) was a small but long-lived union representing confectionery workers in South Africa.

In 1925, a Women Workers' Union was established by F. Klenerman. It affiliated to the South African Trades Union Congress (SATUC), but as a general union, it was prohibited from registering with the government. As it only had membership in two industries, in 1926 it split into the Waitresses' Union and the Sweet Makers' Union. It had about 200 members, which represented 75% of the sweet makers in Johannesburg. It remained affiliated when the SATUC merged into the South African Trades and Labour Council. In the late 1930s, the union was led by Dulcie Hartwell, and in 1937, E. J. Burford established a parallel African Sweet Workers' Union to represent black labourers in the industry.

In 1939, the Garment Workers' Union of South Africa helped the union expand nationwide, and by 1947, it had grown to 1,843 members. It was associated with the left wing of the movement, and in 1951, its secretary, H. Le Roux, was banned by the government.

Unlike most unions in South Africa, the union continued accepting white, "coloured" and Asian members. Its membership had declined to only 298 in 1979, but in 1980, it affiliated to the Trade Union Council of South Africa and began accepting black members, its membership growing to 1,396 by the end of the year. In 1997, it was a founding affiliate of the Federation of Unions of South Africa. It was dissolved in 2005.
