= South African Railways and Harbours Employees' Union =

Trade union in South Africa

The South African Railways and Harbours Employees' Union (SAR&HEU) was a trade union representing lower-paid white workers on the railways in South Africa.

The union was founded in 1924 on the model of the South African Railways and Harbours Salaried Staff Association, representing more junior staff, and had lower subscription rates. It affiliated to the Federal Consultative Council of South African Railways and Harbours Staff Associations (FCC), and by 1962, had 7,875 members. Through the FCC, it became part of the pro-apartheid South African Confederation of Labour, and by 1980, its membership had grown to 12,381.

In 1982, the union became the SATS Employees ' Union, then in 1990, the Transnet Employees' Union. By this time, its membership had fallen to 5,000. It then absorbed the Transnet Union of South Africa, becoming the Transnet Workers' Union, one of SACOL's last three affiliates. Later in the 1990s, it merged into the United Association of South Africa.
