= Jimmy Briggs (politician) =

South African politician and trade unionist

James Dominic Francis Briggs
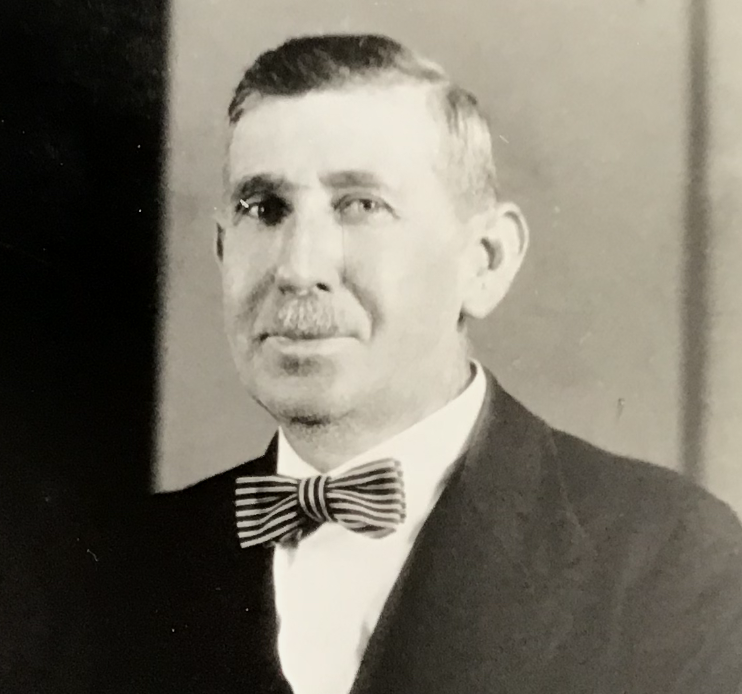

Senator for Transvaal
- In office 1925–1938
- Preceded by: Peter Whiteside

Personal details
- Born: 1 September 1868 Parramatta, Australia
- Died: 6 April 1954 (aged 85) Johannesburg, South Africa
- Party: Labour Party

James Dominic Francis Briggs (1 September 1868 – 6 April 1951), nicknamed "Labour's Briggs", was an Australian-born South African politician and trade unionist. He served as a senator.

== Life and career ==
Born in Parramatta in New South Wales, Briggs moved with his family to Bolton in England when he was ten years old. There, he completed an apprenticeship as a bricklayer and joined the Manchester Unity of Bricklayers trade union.

In 1890, Briggs emigrated to the United States, where he joined the Bricklayers' and Masons' International Union, working in various locations across the country, and also in Canada. In 1902, he emigrated again, to Durban in South Africa. There, he joined the Durban Bricklayers' Society, but soon moved to Pretoria, where he helped found the Operative Bricklayers' Society of South Africa. For five years, he served as chairman of the union. He also chaired the Pretoria Trades Council.

Briggs next moved to Benoni, where he founded and chaired a new branch of the union. He supported its merger into the new Building Workers' Industrial Union, and served for three years as its chairman. He was the union's delegate to the South African Industrial Federation. In 1925, it was replaced by the South African Trades Union Council, of which Briggs was elected as president.

Briggs was a founder member of the Labour Party, and served as its chairman for eight years. In December 1925, he was elected to the Senate of South Africa, representing Transvaal, replacing Peter Whiteside, serving until his resignation in 1938 to contest the 1938 election for Jeppes, but was unsuccessful. The party split in two later in the decade, but reunited in 1931. Briggs was then elected as the party's chairman, a position he served until the mid-1940s.
