= Grobbelaar =

Grobbelaar is a common Afrikaans surname, derived from the German Grobler. It may refer to:

- Arthur Grobbelaar (1925-1984), South African trade unionist
- Bruce Grobbelaar (born 1957), Zimbabwean football player
- Christie Grobbelaar (born 2000), South African rugby union player
- Cobus Grobbelaar (born 1981), South African rugby union player
- Donovan Grobbelaar (born 1983), New Zealand cricketer
- Dirk Grobbelaar (born 1992), South African rugby union player
- Jaco Grobbelaar, South African rugby union player, see List of Bulls (rugby union) players
- Ian Grobbelaar (born 2005), Australian field hockey player
- Johan Grobbelaar (born 1997), South African rugby union player
- Johannes Grobbelaar (died 1991), South African neo-Nazi activist
- Madelaine Grobbelaar Petsch (born 1994), American actress
- General Pieter Grobbelaar (1908–1988), South African military commander
- Pieter Grobbelaar (politician) (born 1944), former member of the South African National Assembly
