= Lucy Mvubelo =

South African trade unionist (1920–2000)

Lucy Buyaphi Mvubelo (1920 – 30 October 2000) was a South African trade unionist.

Born Lucy Twala in Johannesburg, she was educated at the Inanda Seminary School before becoming a teacher. She married McKenzie Mvubelo, but in 1942 left teaching to earn higher pay in a clothing factory. She joined the Garment Workers' Union of African Women and soon became its general secretary. In 1947, she was a convener of the Federation of South African Women, and she was a founder of the South African Congress of Trade Unions (SACTU), serving as its vice president from 1955.

Mvubelo objected to SACTU's decision to affiliate to the African National Congress. The Garment Workers' Union disaffiliated in 1956, and in 1959 she instead became president of the Federation of Free African Trade Unions (FOFATUSA). In 1962, the Garment Workers' Union merged into the new National Union of Clothing Workers (NUCW), with Mvubelo continuing as general secretary. She decided to dissolve FOFATUSA in 1966, as it had few remaining affiliates. Instead, the NUCW joined the Trade Union Council of South Africa (TUCSA), and Mvubelo became one of the first black women to serve on its executive.

The TUCSA expelled unions representing black workers in 1969. Mvubelo argued that the NUCW should continue as an independent union, securing it representation with the International Textile, Garment and Leather Workers' Federation, and personally spoke at the International Labour Organization. It was able to rejoin the TUCSA in 1972, but that year, Mvubelo received significant criticism for not keeping clear financial records.

In the 1980s, Mvubelo was unusual in opposing an economic boycott of South Africa. In 1984, her house was bombed by opponents of her stance. She served on the management committee of the United States-South African Leader Exchange Program, and chaired Women for Peace. The NUCW merged into the National Union of Garment Workers in 1985, and Mvubelo retired the following year.
