= Federation of Independent Trade Unions =

The Federation of Independent Trade Unions can refer to:

- Federation of Independent Trade Unions and Non-Governmental Organisations in Trinidad and Tobago
- Federation of Independent Trade Unions of Russia, an active federation
- Federation of Independent Trade Unions (South Africa), a former federation
