= South African Reduction Workers' Association =

Trade union in South Africa

The South African Reduction Workers' Association (SARWA) was a trade union representing officials involved in processing mining ores in South Africa.

The union was in existence in the early years of the 20th-century, but it nearly collapsed following the Rand Rebellion. By 1926, it had only 900 members, all of whom were white, but it began growing again under the leadership of Archie Moore. It was a founding affiliate of the South African Trades Union Congress, and then to its successor, the South African Trades and Labour Council. However, its acceptance of apartheid led it to split away in 1951, forming part of the new South African Federation of Trade Unions, which later joined the all-white South African Confederation of Labour (SACOL). By 1962, it had 3,300 members.

The union renamed itself as the South African Technical Officials' Association in 1973. In 1980, it decided to begin admitting "coloured" workers, which led SACOL to expel it. In 1996, it merged with the Administrative and Technical Officials' Association, to form the Administrative, Technical and Electronic Association of South Africa.
