= Hotel and Restaurant Workers' Union =

The Hotel and Restaurant Workers' Union was the name of:

- Hotel and Restaurant Workers' Union (Austria)
- Hotel and Restaurant Workers' Union (Finland)
- Hotel and Restaurant Workers' Union (Norway)
- Hotel and Restaurant Workers' Union (South Africa)
- Swedish Hotel and Restaurant Workers' Union
