= Hospitality Industry and Allied Workers' Union =

Trade union in South Africa

The Hospitality Industry and Allied Workers' Union (HIAWU) is a trade union representing workers in the hospitality sector in South Africa.

The union was founded in 1928, as the Natal Liquor and Catering Trade Employees' Union affiliated with the South African Trades and Labour Council and grew slowly, reaching members by 1947.

By 1962, the union had grown to 4,328 members, and was affiliated to the Trade Union Council of South Africa. The vast majority of members were classified as "coloured" or "Indian", although a handful were white. In 1980, it was permitted to accept black workers as members.

In 1986, the union was a founding affiliate of the National Council of Trade Unions. The federation encouraged it to merge with the rival HOTELICCA union, while it also discussed a possible merger with the Hotel and Restaurant Workers' Union. Ultimately, it instead remained independent, renaming itself as the "Hospitality Industries and Allied Workers' Union", and affiliated to the Federation of Unions of South Africa.
