= Dulcie Hartwell =

South Africa trade union leader.(1915–2012)

Dulcie Marie Hartwell (18 October 1915 – 30 October 2012) was a South Africa trade union leader.

Born in Johannesburg, Hartwell's mother died when Dulcie was three years old. The family then struggled for money, and Hartwell had to leave school early. In 1933, she began working in the clothing industry, and joined the Garment Workers' Union of South Africa (GWUSA). By 1937, she was working as an organiser for GWUSA, and was also secretary of the Johannesburg Sweet Workers' Union.

Hartwell worked closely with Solly Sachs, the general secretary of GWUSA, and the two married in 1942. Hartwell next became secretary of the clothing industry unemployment fund, then its medical aid society.

In 1951, Hartwell and Sachs separated. That year, she became general secretary of the South African Trades and Labour Council, then of its successor, the Trade Union Council of South Africa, which excluded black workers. In 1962, she switched to become secretary of the National Union of Distributive Workers and the National Union of Commercial, Catering and Allied Workers, then later the merged National Union of Distributive and Allied Workers.

Hartwell retired to Cape Town and died in 2012.

Trade union offices
Preceded by Alexander Gordon Forsyth	General Secretary of the South African Trades and Labour Council; 1951–1954; With: Harry Boyder (1951–1953)	Succeeded by Federation dissolved
Preceded by New position	General Secretary of the Trade Union Council of South Africa; 1954–1962	Succeeded by Terence O'Donoghue
