= South African Guild of Actors =

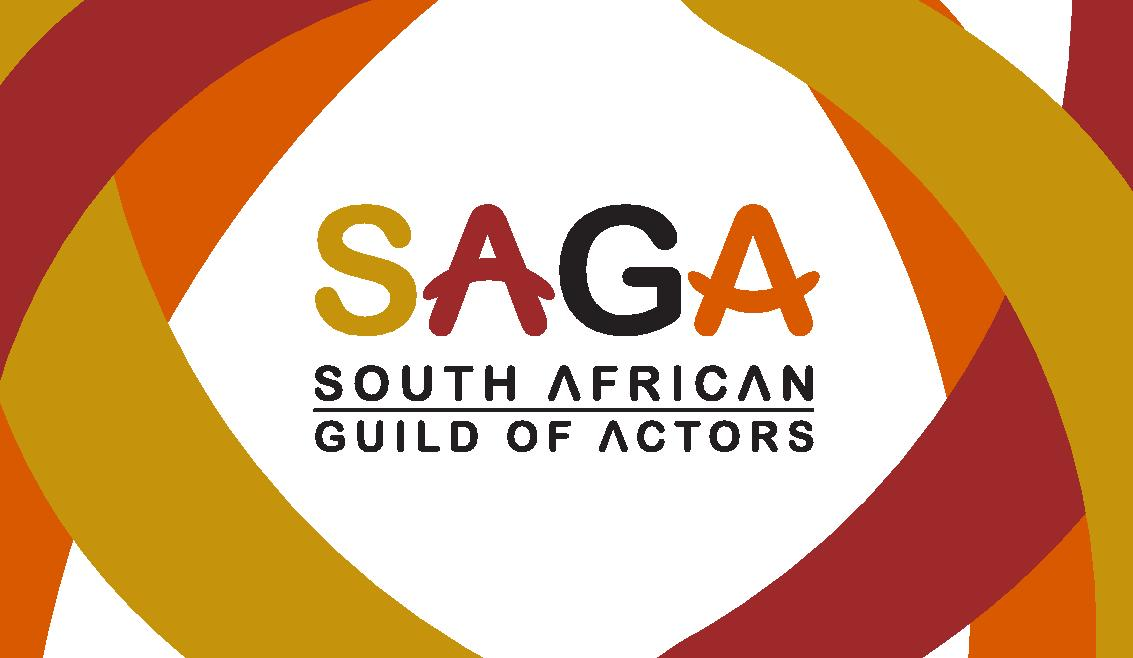
South African Guild of Actors

The South African Guild of Actors (SAGA) is the organisation representing actors in film, television, stage, commercial, and corporate sectors in South Africa. Founded in 2009, SAGA exists to enhance actors' working conditions, compensation, and benefits, and to serve as a unified voice advocating for performers' rights and industry professionalisation.

SAGA is incorporated as a Section 21 Company and registered as a non-profit organisation (NPO) with the Department of Social Development, ensuring transparency, accountability, and that all funds advance actors' interests exclusively.

Mission and Values

SAGA's mission is "to champion the rights and welfare of South African actors by advocating for legislative reform, fair labour practices and industry professionalisation". The organisation envisions a performing arts industry where every actor is protected by law, fairly compensated, and empowered to pursue a sustainable career in a professional, ethical, and inclusive environment.

Core values include being non-racial, apolitical, democratic, and committed to industry fairness, transparency, and artistic freedom.

History and Timeline

Formation (2009)

On 23 February 2009, an open meeting was held at the Actor's Centre in the Johannesburg Civic Theatre to discuss forming a representative actors' body. The meeting was organised by Carlynn de Waal-Smit (an agent), Stacy Koma (an actress and lawyer), and Zane Meas (an actor who chaired the meeting). More than 150 actors and technicians attended.

Follow-up meetings in Cape Town led to the formal establishment of the Guild. At the first sitting of the Interim Board, a strategic decision was adopted to represent actors specifically rather than all artists. Interim officials were elected to register SAGA as a trade union. However, it was subsequently discovered that South African labour law expressly excluded freelance workers — classified as independent contractors — from trade union protection. As of 2025 this legal landscape is beginning to shift, following a landmark Labour Appeal Court decision which extended worker rights to atypical forms of employment, including gig-economy workers.

Precluded from forming a union, SAGA registered as a professional guild (a Section 21 Company and non-profit organisation) as an interim measure to represent actors. To ensure representation under labour law, SAGA formed a strategic alliance with UASA (a registered trade union) on 17 June 2010, allowing actors to access labour rights through UASA's existing framework, including the Federation of Trade Unions FEDUSA. Since 2018 the Guild had been advocating for basic labour rights, motivating for a sectoral determination to be introduced into the Labour Relations Act. By 2023 SAGA's continued advocacy for legislative reform revealed that its interests were no longer aligned with those of UASA, which remains purely a labour union. A strategic realignment saw SAGA sever ties with its labour partner from 31 October 2023.

Early Registration and Affiliations (2009–2012)

- 17 June 2009: SAGA joined the South African Screen Federation (SASFED)
- 23 July 2009: SAGA adopted its constitution
- 17 June 2010: SAGA entered into a strategic alliance with UASA (a labour union)
- 1 September 2010: First SAGA members officially joined the Guild
- December 2010: SAGA delegation met with FIA, British Equity, and SAG in London and New York
- 20 April 2011: SAGA registered as a Section 21 Company with the CIPC.
- 25–30 September 2012: SAGA was invited to become a full member of the International Federation of Actors (FIA) at the Toronto Congress
- 2012: SAGA elected as full FIA member alongside guilds from 68 countries including SAG-AFTRA (USA) and ACTRA (Canada)

In its nascent phase, SAGA pursued international engagement, including meetings with bodies like the International Federation of Actors (FIA), British Equity, and SAG-AFTRA in late 2010, laying groundwork for FIA membership in 2012 and establishing credibility amid domestic challenges such as inconsistent contracts and limited protections.

In 2013 FIA agreed to fund annual Capacity Building projects for SAGA for a period of 5 years; this offer was later renewed until 2022. SAGA became a key member of AfroFIA, engaging with delegates from the continent including Camaroon, Ghana, Madagascar and Morocco.

Legislative Advocacy Period (2013–2018)

SAGA became actively engaged in parliamentary submissions on performers' rights:

- 2014: During the Generations soap opera strike, SAGA warned that actors could be held in breach of contract as they were not protected by labour laws, unlike unionised workers
- 2016: When High Rollers was abruptly cancelled, SAGA voiced concern over producers' willingness to cancel contracts before expiration
- 12 May 2018: When an actor fell to his death on a film set in the Drakensberg, SAGA initiated an investigation in collaboration with City Press, highlighting unsafe working conditions
- 2017–2018: SAGA made formal submissions to Parliament on the Performers Protection Amendment Bill and Copyright Amendment Bill, advocating for performers' royalty rights and legal protections

In October 2013 the cast of South Africa’s longest-running soap Generations entered a protracted contractual dispute with the public broadcaster, the SABC. When 16 cast members embarked on a so-called 'strike' barely a year later, the producer and broadcaster announced an indefinite hiatus in production. The cast were being advised by the defunct trade union CWUSA, while SAGA warned that the actors could be held in breach of contract as they were not protected by the Labour Laws. Ultimately the group of actors had their contracts terminated and the show was cancelled.

When South African television drama High Rollers was abruptly cancelled in 2016, SAGA voiced concern over South African producers' willingness to cancel production contracts before expiration. The producer laid the blame squarely at the feet of the commissioning broadcaster; the SABC was at the time embroiled in allegations of financial mismanagement and corruption.

When an actor fell to his death on 12 May 2018 while on a film set in the Drakensberg mountains in South Africa's KwaZulu-Natal province, SAGA initiated an investigation in collaboration with City Press. SAGA's investigations uncovered allegations of bullying, ignored safety concerns expressed by actors and crew, together with a systemic disregard for occupational health and safety standards. The producer, a controversial activist and founder of 'Media for Justice', disclaimed any responsibility, dismissing the incident as an "accident".

On 13 September 2018, SAGA made a presentation to the Portfolio Committee on Trade and Industry in the Parliament of South Africa in support of the Performers Protection Amendment Bill (2016). The previous year, on 4 August 2017, SAGA had appealed to the Portfolio Committee on Trade and Industry against aspects of the proposed legislative review of the Copyright Amendment Bill (2014). The legislation subsequently underwent a protracted and controversial process: it was passed twice by both the National Assembly and the National Council of Provinces, subjected to public hearings in all nine provincial legislatures, and finally referred to the Constitutional Court in 2023, where its constitutionality remains under review as of 2026. Throughout this process, SAGA engaged at every stage, submitting both written and oral representations to parliamentary committees, provincial legislatures and the Constitutional Court, advocating for performers’ royalty rights and legal protections.

Sectoral Determination Campaign (2019–2023)

SAGA intensified its campaign for statutory protection for freelance actors:

- 11 December 2019: Labour Minister published Notice R1591 in the Government Gazette announcing intention to regulate the entertainment industry
- 11 February 2020: SAGA made submission to Department of Employment and Labour (DEL) regarding statutory protection for freelance actors
- 27 February 2020: SAGA delegation met with DEL at NEDLAC
- 17 July 2020: SAGA made further submission to DEL via FEDUSA requesting a Sectoral Determination
- 15 February 2021: Theatre and Dance Alliance (TADA) established with SAGA as founding member
- 2021–2022: SAGA engaged with SWIFT on developing intimacy protocols and with SASFED on COVID-19 protocols
- 31 January 2022: SAGA signed MOU with SASA (Stunts Association)
- 6 July 2022: SAGA signed MOU with OSCASA (extras' casting agents)
- 18 July 2023: SAGA announced it would sever ties with UASA, effective 1 November 2023, to focus independently on actors' unique needs
- 31 January 2025: The Competition Commission grants SAGA and the Personal Managers Association a conditional five‑year exemption from certain provisions of the Competition Act, enabling collective bargaining on minimum terms and working conditions for performers.

SAGA has been vocal about the international issue of sexual harassment in the entertainment Industry. The SWIFT (Sisters Working in Film and Television) campaign #ThatsNotOK highlighting the plight of harassment has been endorsed and supported by SAGA. The collaboration of both organisations has brought about a Code of Conduct to be adopted by all industry professionals as well as addendum suggested for all actors and industry practitioners to sign in their contracts.

From 2019, the Guild increasingly focused on securing statutory protection for freelance performers through a dedicated sectoral determination under South African labour law. In December 2019 the Minister of Employment and Labour published a notice of intention to regulate the performing arts and audiovisual sector, which SAGA welcomed as an opportunity to close the long‑identified gap affecting freelance actors. The Guild followed this with written submissions to the Department of Employment and Labour and engagements at NEDLAC, arguing that performers should be recognised as vulnerable workers entitled to minimum standards on pay, hours, safety and social protections.

Over the next several years SAGA participated in consultations with government, federations and industry bodies on how such a determination should be framed. It advocated for a definition of “performer” broad enough to cover screen, stage and recorded media work, and stressed that contrary to global norms, many actors function as dependent contractors despite being formally labelled as independent. During this period the Guild also deepened its collaboration with sector partners, becoming a founding member of the Theatre and Dance Alliance and strengthening its role within the South African Screen Federation, which it used to present a unified front in discussions with policymakers.

In parallel, SAGA continued to provide case‑based evidence of precarious working conditions through its work on non‑payment, unsafe sets and unilateral contract changes in submissions and policy papers to demonstrate that the absence of clear legal standards in the entertainment industry had direct consequences for performers’ livelihoods. By the end of 2023, although a dedicated sectoral determination had not yet been promulgated, much of the groundwork for reform had been laid through these combined processes of formal engagement and public advocacy.

At the same time, SAGA pursued structural remedies aimed at strengthening performers’ bargaining power. On 17 October 2022 the South African Guild of Actors and the Personal Managers Association filed an application with the Competition Commission in terms of section 10(1) of the Competition Act for an exemption from provisions that would otherwise treat coordinated negotiations over minimum terms as prohibited collusion. The Commission published notice of the application in the Government Gazette in August 2023 and invited public comment. On 31 January 2025 it granted a conditional five‑year exemption, allowing SAGA and the PMA, subject to specified conditions, to engage jointly with producers, broadcasters and other market participants on matters such as remuneration levels, working conditions and standard‑form agreements for performers. The decision was welcomed by the Guild, civil‑society organisations and industry commentators as an important step towards giving freelance actors practical collective‑bargaining capacity pending broader labour‑law reforms. The Commercial Producers Association of South Africa and the Association for Communication and Advertising subsequently lodged an appeal against the exemption at the Competition Tribunal, but later withdrew their application, leaving the exemption in force.

Recent Activism and Regulatory Shortcomings (2024–2026)

From 2024 onwards SAGA’s activism increasingly centred on high‑profile cases of non‑payment and contract breaches affecting television and streaming productions. When cast and crew on series such as "Queendom" reported prolonged non-payment, the Guild publicly criticised the situation. They described it as emblematic of an industry in which commissioning entities and intermediaries could routinely delay or withhold payment without effective sanction. Responding to an open letter, Sports Arts and Culture Minister Gayton McKenzie levelled criticism at the cast and crew for the way in which they had approached his department for help. SAGA representatives used media interviews and statements to argue that the lack of enforceable standards and oversight left performers carrying the financial risks of production and distribution failures.

Similar issues arose around the production “Pound 4 Pound”, where actors alleged that only lead performers had been paid. SAGA criticised the decision by a public broadcaster to continue contracting with a company that still faced unresolved claims from its cast, arguing that public institutions should not entrench a cycle of impunity by rehiring producers with outstanding obligations.

In 2024 the Guild also drew attention to serious abuses affecting background performers on the historical drama series ''uShaka Ilembe''. In a detailed statement SAGA reported that hundreds of hopeful extras had been recruited from across several provinces, transported to Johannesburg at their own expense and housed in makeshift accommodation with poor access to food and sanitation, with some individuals allegedly threatened if they spoke out about their experiences. In a statement, the Guild characterised these conditions as amounting to “sweatshop” practices and warned that elements of the scheme resembled modern forms of human trafficking in the film and television sector. Producers Bomb Productions, broadcaster MultiChoice and the National Film and Video Foundation subsequently issued statements distancing themselves from unauthorised camps and supporting investigations into the alleged ill‑treatment of extras. SAGA stated that it had referred the matter to the Directorate for Priority Crime Investigation, was engaging with the South African Screen Federation and anti‑trafficking organisation A21, and intended to establish a confidential reporting platform for performers to raise concerns about legal or ethical abuses in the industry.

These interventions formed part of a broader series of open letters and public appeals in which the Guild called on government departments and regulators to address systemic non‑payment and to treat the entertainment sector as part of the broader labour market rather than an exceptional cultural sphere.

At the same time, SAGA engaged with emerging policy shifts that promised to alter the legal position of performers. The Guild drew attention to ministerial guidelines and Labour Appeal Court jurisprudence expanding the concept of “worker” to encompass certain atypical and gig‑economy arrangements, and welcomed the Minister of Employment and Labour’s subsequent announcement of an intention to classify certain performers as employees for the purposes of labour legislation. SAGA submitted comments on these proposals and participated in public debate, arguing that clearer deeming provisions would reduce disputes over employment status and give performers access to protections such as unemployment insurance, compensation for occupational injuries and collective bargaining mechanisms.

These developments coincided with renewed mobilisation in the broader film and television sector, including marches and media campaigns highlighting low pay, insecurity, the absence of residuals and the collapse of the government administered Film and TV Production Incentive. SAGA’s representatives appeared in broadcast and print interviews to emphasise that the combination of non‑payment incidents and legal ambiguity amounted to a structural crisis rather than isolated disputes. By early 2026 the Guild was explicitly linking its long‑running campaigns on sectoral determination and copyright reform to this evolving landscape, presenting improved labour status for performers as a necessary counterpart to debates about intellectual property, remuneration and regulation in South Africa’s screen industries.

Governance and Office-Bearers

SAGA is governed by a National Executive Committee, composed exclusively of full members, who are professional actors eligible to vote in elections and hold office. Elections are held every two years and office bearers serve as unpaid volunteers. The committee oversees strategic direction, advocacy, and operational accountability, with leadership roles distributed across national and regional positions to represent members in film, television, stage, commercial, and corporate sectors. As a Section 21 Company and NPO, it is subject to annual audits and prohibited from paying dividends, ensuring all funds raised serve actors' interests.

Current Leadership (2024–2026)

Position	Name
National Chair	Jack Devnarain
Vice Chair	Adrian Galley
National Secretary/Treasurer	Carlynn de Waal-Smit
National Legal Liaison	Daniel Janks
Vice Secretary (Cape Town)	Thoko Ntshinga
Vice Secretary (Durban)	Londiwe Shange
Media and Communications	Hungani Ndlovu
Memberships	Nambitha Mpumlwana
Events	Jacques Adriaanse

Source: SAGA official website

Membership Categories and Requirements

The South African Guild of Actors (SAGA) offers five distinct membership categories tailored to different stages of professional development, support roles, and recognition within the acting industry. These include Full Membership for established professionals, Associate Membership for early-career aspirants, Student Membership for emerging talent, Patron Membership for financial supporters, and Honorary Life Membership for distinguished veterans. Eligibility across categories generally requires legal entitlement to work in South Africa and alignment with sectors such as film, theatre, television, radio, commercials, voice-over, or corporate productions.

Services Provided to Members

The South African Guild of Actors (SAGA) provides a range of services to its members aimed at supporting professional development, legal protection, and financial welfare in the performing arts industry. These include access to standard contracts, in-house legal support for contract review and disputes, and facilitation of workshops, webinars, and networking events to enhance skills and industry connections.

Through these structures and services, SAGA functions as both a representative body for individual actors and a collective platform for addressing wider industry conditions.
