= Federation of Independent Trade Unions (South Africa) =

South African trade union federation

The Federation of Independent Trade Unions (FITU) was a national trade union federation in South Africa.

The federation was established in March 1991 by a variety of trade unions. Its largest affiliates were all skilled unions focused on white workers, which had been part of the former Trade Union Council of South Africa (TUCSA). This led to controversy, and when they elected a white general secretary, Willie Coetzee, some affiliates resigned, arguing that it simply represented a refounding of the TUCSA.

By 1994, FITU claimed 24 affiliates, with a total of 236,000 members. These affiliates included the South African Typographical Union, the South African Boilermakers' Society, and the Amalgamated Union of Building Trade Workers of South Africa. In 1997, most of its affiliates transferred to the new Federation of Unions of South Africa, and FITU then dissolved.
