= National Union of Clothing Workers =

Trade union in South Africa

The National Union of Clothing Workers (NUCW) was a trade union representing garment workers in South Africa.

The union was founded in 1962, when the Garment Workers' Union of African Women merged with the African Clothing Workers' Union. It affiliated to the Federation of Free African Trade Unions (FOFATUSA) which, like the NUCW, was led by Lucy Mvubelo. The NUCW represented black workers, and it worked closely with the Garment Workers' Union of South Africa (GWUSA), which represented white and coloured workers, but South African law prohibited the two from merging. It was also prohibited from joining industrial councils, so much of its representation was through the smaller GWUSA.

After FOFATU was dissolved, the NUCW affiliated to the Trade Union Council of South Africa and, while the council expelled all unions of black workers in 1969, the NUCW was able to rejoin in 1972. By 1985, it had 26,000 members. That year, it was finally permitted to merge with GWUSA, forming the National Union of Garment Workers.
