= National Union of Leather Workers =

The National Union of Leather Workers is the former name of:

- National Union of Leather and Allied Workers, a South African trade union
- National Union of Leather Workers and Allied Trades, a former British trade union
