= South African Footplate Staff Association =

Trade union in South Africa

The South African Footplate Staff Association (SAFSA) was a trade union representing white railway workers in South Africa.

The union was founded in 1905, as the Locomotive Engineers' Mutual Aid Society. It was initially focused on the Cape, but by the 1920s had 1,500 members across the country. It affiliated to the Federal Consultative Council of South African Railways and Harbours Staff Associations (FCC), and by 1962 it had 9,896 members. In 1975, the other FCC members affiliated to the South African Confederation of Labour, but SAFSA decided against joining.

In 1976, SAFSA formed the South African Central Labour Organisation with the Amalgamated Engineering Union of South Africa, but it proved unsuccessful, and in 1982 the union instead joined the Trade Union Council of South Africa (TUCSA). By 1980, it had 9,331 members, all of whom were white.

In 1984, SAFSA resigned from TUCSA, later joining the Federation of South African Labour Unions, and then its successor, the Federation of Unions of South Africa. It began accepting all workers, and in 1998 it absorbed the Democratic Labour Union of South Africa, which mainly represented black workers. In 2000, it merged with the Technical Workers' Union, to form the United Transport and Allied Trade Union.
