= Motor Industry Employees' Union =

Trade union in South Africa

The Motor Industry Employees' Union was a trade union representing workers involved in vehicle building in South Africa.

The union was founded under the influence of an employers' organisation, the Motor Industry Employers' Association, which wanted to deal with a single trade union representing all white and "coloured" workers in the industry. It was established in 1939, bringing together two unions, one based in the Cape Province and one in Johannesburg, both of which had split away from the Amalgamated Engineering Union of South Africa. The union affiliated to the South African Trades and Labour Council, and by 1947, it had 4,753 members.

The union transferred to the Trade Union Council of South Africa (TUCSA), and in 1961, it was compelled to move its "coloured" membership to a new union, the Motor Industry Combined Workers' Union. Despite this, by 1962, MIEU's membership had grown to 14,430. By 1982, it had disaffiliated from TUCSA, but continued to grow, with 23,000 members, all of whom were white.

By 2003, the union principally represented technical employees in the industry. That year, it merged into the Motor Industry Staff Association.
