= Southern African Clothing and Textile Workers Union =

Trade union in South Africa

SACTWU
- Southern African Clothing and Textile Workers' Union
- Founded: 16 September 1989
- Headquarters: 350 Victoria Rd, Salt River, Cape Town, South Africa
- Location: South Africa
- Members: 100,000
- Key people: Themba Khumalo, president Andre Kriel, general secretary
- Affiliations: COSATU
- Website: www.sactwu.org.za

The Southern African Clothing and Textile Workers' Union (SACTWU) is the biggest union in the South African clothing, textile, footwear and leather industry, with more than 100 000 members. It negotiates wages for the vast majority of workers in these industries in South Africa, with the collective bargaining agreements covering over 150 000 workers.

SACTWU is the sixth largest affiliate of the Congress of South African Trade Unions (COSATU). The union was born through the merger of the Amalgamated Clothing and Textile Workers' Union of South Africa and the Garment and Allied Workers' Union of South Africa, on 16 September 1989.

== Leadership ==
=== General Secretaries ===
Jabu Ngcobo
1999: Ebrahim Patel
2009: Andre Kriel

=== Presidents ===
1989: Amon Ntuli
2003: Themba Khumalo
