= National Union of Railway and Harbour Servants =

Trade union in South Africa

The National Union of Railway and Harbour Servants was established in South Africa in 1910. It welcomed all races into membership.

In December 1935, it was infiltrated by the Afrikaner Broederbond, who established an Afrikaner trade union called Die Spoorbund. Its members were also NURAHS members and ensured the union conference passed that resolution to exclude non-white members.
