= Garment Workers' Union of the Western Province =

Trade union in South Africa

The Garment Workers' Union of the Western Province (GWU-WP) was a trade union representing workers in the clothing industry in the Western Cape Province of South Africa.

The union was founded in 1933 by Harry Evans as the Garment Workers' Union of the Cape Peninsula, and registered with the government two years later. It gradually expanded its remit to cover Cape Town, Simonstown and Wynberg, and therefore became the GWUWP. It represented white and "coloured" workers, but not black workers.

The union focused on providing friendly benefits to its members, including creches, educational bursaries and housing loans. It introduced unemployment insurance in 1940, and sickness insurance in 1942. It made little effort to increase wages for workers, and clothing workers in the Western Cape remained significantly lower paid than those in the Transvaal. Due to its non-combative attitude, it was supported by many employers, and grew to be the largest union in South Africa.

The union affiliated to the Trade Union Council of South Africa (TUCSA), and by 1981, it had 51,000 members. It remained a TUCSA affiliate until that federation dissolved, in 1986. The following year, it was interested in becoming part of the new Amalgamated Clothing and Textile Workers' Union of South Africa, but was rejected due to its non-combative position. On 5 December, it merged with the Garment Workers' Industrial Union, to form the Garment and Allied Workers' Union of South Africa.

== General Secretaries ==
1933: Harry Evans
1935: Bob Stewart
1946: Rose Crawford
1954: Louis Petersen
