= Durban Indian Municipal Employees' Society =

Trade union in South Africa

The Durban Indian Municipal Employees' Society (DIMES) was a trade union representing municipal workers of Indian origin, in Durban, South Africa. DIMES was preceded by the Durban Municipal Indian Employees Union (DMIEU), which came into being in 1917, but faded in the mid 1920's. Many municipal workers were housed at Magazine Barracks and DMIEU was reconstituted as DIMES, in 1934 or 1936. By 1943, DIMES had 2,450 members, and was affiliated to the South African Trades and Labour Council.

In the 1940s, the union was led by Billy Peters, a member of the Communist Party of South Africa. It opposed apartheid, and in 1955 was a founding affiliate of the inclusive South African Congress of Trade Unions (SACTU). One of the federation's larger affiliates, in 1962, it had about 1,600 members. However, the union's leadership had moved to the right, and when SACTU was banned, they switched its membership to the more conservative Trade Union Council of South Africa.

In 1980, the union was permitted to accept all workers, regardless of ethnicity, and in recognition of this, it changed its name to the Durban Integrated Municipal Employees' Society. After obtaining a 20% pay increase in 1988, it attracted many members of the formerly white union, and grew rapidly. In 1990, it became the Democratic Integrated Municipal Employees' Society, and by 1992, it had about 13,000 members. On 1 July 1994, it merged into the South African Municipal Workers' Union.
