= Die Spoorbond =

20th century Afrikaner trade union

Die Spoorbond was an Afrikaner railway trade-union formed in 1934 by H. J. Klopper, founder of the Afrikaner Broederbond, which advocated a policy of replacing all black railway-workers with Afrikaners. It rejected strikes and called instead for loyal service to the South African Railways and Harbours Administration (SARHA). The union had a membership of some 16,000 in the 1930s, considerably more than that of its rival, the National Union of Railway and Harbour Servants, which was forced to dissolve in 1937.

In 1941, SARHA decided to recognise different unions for each section of workers. This restricted die Spoorbond to representing only those seen as the least skilled, mostly labourers. The union resisted this, leading SARHA to found a rival Railworkers' Union, but in 1949 it agreed to the group representation.

The union joined the Federal Consultative Council of South African Railways and Harbours Staff Associations, and later affiliated to the Co-ordinating Council of South African Trade Unions, then to the South African Confederation of Labour. By 1980 it had 6,300 members. In 1982, it amended its constitution to allow it to admit all workers, regardless of ethnicity, although it did not immediately start doing so.
