= William H. Andrews (unionist) =

South African trade unionist

William Henry Andrews
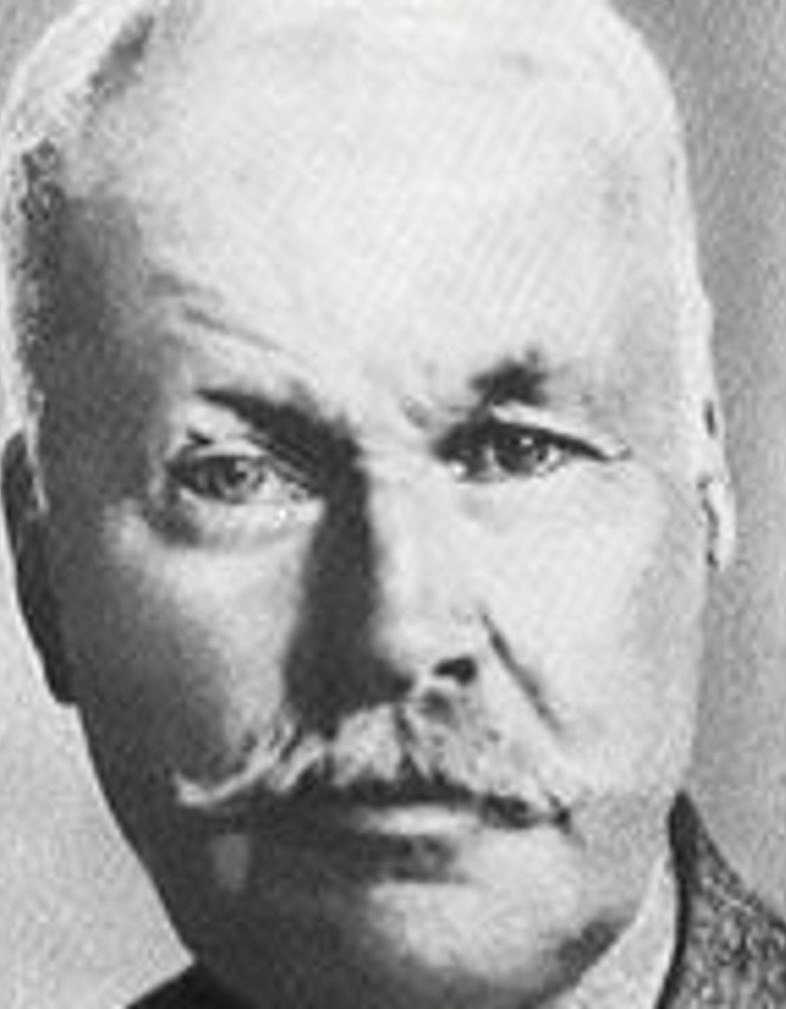
- Bill Andrews

General Secretary of the Communist Party of South Africa
- In office 1921–1925

Chairman of the Communist Party of South Africa
- In office 1939–1950

Personal details
- Born: 20 April 1870 Leiston, Suffolk, England, UK
- Died: 25 December 1950 (aged 80) Rondebosch, Cape Town
- Party: CPSA
- Other political affiliations: SALP (1910–1915); ISL (1915–1921)

William Henry Andrews (20 April 1870 – 26 December 1950) was the first chairman of the South African Labour Party (SALP) and the first General Secretary of the Communist Party of South Africa. He was also active in the formation of the Industrial and Commercial Workers' Union.

== Biography ==
Born in Leiston Suffolk, to Francis Andrews, a fitter, and Sarah Hannah Belmoor. Andrews left school in 1883 and was apprenticed as a fitter and turner. He joined the Amalgamated Society of Engineers in 1890. In 1891 he became a journeyman fitter and turner. He travelled to Johannesburg in 1893, holding jobs on gold mines in the West Rand until the 1899. With the beginning of Second Boer War in 1899, Andrews and his family returned to Britain but returned to the Cape in 1900. He joined the British forces for six months before joining the Imperial Military Railways.

Increasingly prominent as a trade union organiser, he became the official organiser of the South African ASE in 1904 and its president in 1905. Andrews was the President of the Witwatersrand Trades and Labour Council and the Political Labour League in 1905, the Labour Representation Committee in 1906 and the South African Labour Party in 1909. In 1907, when the Transvaal Colony obtained self-government, Andrews, as Labour party leader, was elected to one of three seat his party won in the election.

Andrews was first elected as a Labour MP at the 1912 Georgetown by-election. Andrews served as a Member of Parliament until the 1915 general election after he had resigned from the Labour Party in August 1914, opposed to the country's participation in World War I. On 22 September 1915, he was elected chairman of the International Socialist League.

In 1915, he was elected as the first President of the International Socialist League, which formed when anti-war socialists split from the SALP. He visited the United Kingdom in 1918, where he was impressed by the British shop stewards' movement at the time. On 31 July 1921, he became the first General Secretary of the Communist Party of South Africa, and in 1922 the editor of the party's newspaper The International. In 1925, he was elected as the first Secretary of the South African Trades Union Council.

In 1922, as part of the Committee of Action, he and others coerced the South African Industrial Federation into calling a general strike the resulted in the Rand Revolt. He was arrested on 10 March 1922 when martial law was declared. In 1923, while in Moscow, he was elected a committee member of the Third International.

Andrews was expelled from the South African Communist Party in 1931 during a series of purges over opposition to the "Black Republic" policy, which stipulated that South Africa belonged to the black natives and that most of South Africa's revolutionary potential laid with them. After a visit to Moscow in 1937, he was permitted to re-join on 1 May 1938 at the age of 68 after Solly Sachs, Moses Kotane, and Brian Bunting were re-admitted. He would not support the South African effort at the beginning of the Second World War, toeing the Soviet line but after Soviet Union was attacked by the Germans in 1941, his attitude changed.

== Marriage ==
He married Mary O'Brien in 1897, a daughter of an Anglican reverend and had two sons and a daughter.

== Death ==
Andrews died in Rondebosch, Cape Town on 26 December 1950.

Party political offices
Preceded by New position	General Secretary of the Communist Party of South Africa; 1921–1925	Succeeded by Jimmy Shields
Preceded by Issie Wolfson	Chair of the Communist Party of South Africa; 1939–1948	Succeeded by Party dissolved
Trade union offices
Preceded by New position	General Secretary of the South African Trades Union Council; 1925–1930	Succeeded by Federation merged
Preceded by New position	General Secretary of the South African Trades and Labour Council; 1930–1932	Succeeded by A. G. Forsyth
