= Federal Consultative Council of South African Railways and Harbours Staff Associations =

South African trade union federation

The Federal Consultative Council of South African Railways and Harbours Staff Associations (FCC) was a national trade union federation bringing together unions representing white railway workers in South Africa.

The council was established in 1928 by the Artisan Staff Association and the South African Railways and Harbours Salaried Staff Association. In 1957, it affiliated to the South African Confederation of Labour (SACOL), a loose grouping. However, SACOL became gradually more centralised. In 1975, the FCC decided to disaffiliate, but all but one of its affiliates immediately signed up to SACOL.

== Affiliates ==
As of 1962, the following unions were affiliated to the FCC:

Union	Abbreviation	Founded	Membership (1962)
Artisan Staff Association	ASA	1924	16,611
Die Spoorbond		1933	12,223
Locomotive Engineers' Mutual Aid Society	LEMAS	1905	9,896
Running and Operating Staff Union	ROSU	1936	11,680
Salaried Staff Association	SALSTAFF	1918	20,000
South African Railways and Harbours Employees' Union	SAR&HEU	1924	7,875
South African Railways Police Staff Association			1,946
