= United Transport and Allied Trade Union =

Trade union in South Africa

The United Transport and Allied Trade Union (UTATU) was a trade union representing workers in the transport industry in South Africa.

The union was established in 2000, when the South African Footplate Staff Association merged with the Technical Workers' Union. Like both its predecessors, it affiliated to the Federation of Unions of South Africa. By 2011, it had about 25,000 members. In 2012, it merged with the South African Railways and Harbours Union, to form UTATU SARWHU. The union was initially known as UTATU SARWHU, but became UNTU in 2014.
