= Engineering Industrial Workers' Union =

Trade union in South Africa

The Engineering Industrial Workers' Union (EIWU) was a trade union representing engineering workers in South Africa.

The Iron and Steel and Metal Workers' Union became the No 5 branch of the Amalgamated Engineering Union of South Africa (AEU) in 1947. However, the expelled its non-white members in 1957. They joined the now-independent No 5 branch en masse, and in 1961 this founded the Engineering Industrial Workers' Union. It affiliated to the Trade Union Council of South Africa (TUCSA), and grew rapidly: from 430 members in 1962, to 11,849 in 1980.

The union resigned from TUCSA in 1985, in protest at its focus on white workers. It renamed itself as the Engineering, Industrial and Mining Workers' Union. On 1 August 1995, it merged with the AEU, the Iron Moulders' Society of South Africa, and the South African Boilermakers' Society, to form the National Employees' Trade Union.
