= Amalgamated Clothing and Textile Workers' Union of South Africa =

Trade union in South Africa

The Amalgamated Clothing and Textile Workers' Union of South Africa (ACTWUSA) was a trade union representing workers in the garment and fabric industries in South Africa.

The union was founded in 1987, when the National Union of Textile Workers merged with the National Union of Garment Workers, and the Textile Workers' Industrial Union. The Garment Workers' Union of the Western Province hoped to join, but was rejected as it was regarded as a benefit society which did not represent workers' rights. The Garment Workers' Industrial Union decided against joining.

The union had about 70,000 members, mostly in Natal and Transvaal. Like its predecessors, it affiliated to the Congress of South African Trade Unions. On 16 September 1989, it merged with the Garment and Allied Workers' Union of South Africa, to form the Southern African Clothing and Textile Workers Union.
