= Health & Other Services Personnel Trade Union of South Africa =

HOSPERSA
- Health & Other Services Personnel Trade Union of South Africa
- Founded: 1989
- Headquarters: Pretoria and Hillcrest, South Africa
- Location: South Africa
- Members: 50,000 (2011)
- Key people: Godfrey Selematsela, president Noel Desfontaines, general secretary
- Affiliations: FEDUSA, PSI
- Website: www.hospersa.co.za

The Health & Other Services Personnel Trade Union of South Africa (HOSPERSA) is a trade union in South Africa.

The union was founded in 1989, when the Hospital Public Servants' Association merged with the Association of Cape Provincial Hospitals, forming the Hospital Personnel Association of South Africa. In 1993, it joined the Federation of South African Labour Unions (FEDSAL), at which time, it had 40,714 members. It registered with the Government of South Africa in 1994, and in 1995 it absorbed the Natal Provincial Administration Personnel Association.

In 1997, FEDSAL became part of the new Federation of Unions of South Africa, with which HOSPERSA has since been affiliated. It is also affiliated to the Public Services International. It has a membership of 50,000 and represents employees in the Public Service as well as in the private sector.
