= Arthur Grobbelaar =

James Arthur Grobbelaar (24 August 1925 – 3 August 1984) was a South African trade union leader.

Born in Pretoria, Grobbelaar attended the Observatory Boys' School, then worked for South African Railways. He completed an apprenticeship as a boilermaker, then returned to work for the railways before becoming a hotel manager. Returning to boilermaking, he became active in the South African Boilermakers' Society, and rose to become administrative secretary. In 1963, he was appointed as acting general secretary of the Trade Union Council of South Africa (TUCSA), winning election to the post on an ongoing basis the following year.

Under Grobbelaar's leadership, TUCSA admitted unions of black workers, and grew to a peak membership of 478,420 in 1983. However, Grobbelaar also argued that unions of black workers should be subordinate to parallel unions of white workers. Grobbelaar also served on various government committees, and a perceived closeness of TUCSA to the government led many black workers to form independent unions.

Grobbelaar died suddenly in 1984, while still in office.

Trade union offices
Preceded by Terence O'Donoghue	Genera Secretary of the Trade Union Council of South Africa; 1963–1984	Succeeded by Post vacant
