= National Employees' Trade Union =

Trade union in South Africa

The National Employees' Trade Union (NETU) was a trade union representing workers in various industries, principally relating to engineering, in South Africa.

The union was founded on 1 August 1995, when the Amalgamated Engineering Union of South Africa merged with the Engineering, Industrial and Mining Workers' Union, the Iron Moulders' Society of South Africa, and the South African Boilermakers' Society. On formation, it had 66,000 members, but this fell rapidly, many employees transferring to the rival Solidarity union. It was down to 26,000 members by 2003. In April 2003, it merged into the United Association of South Africa.
