= Garment and Allied Workers' Union of South Africa =

Trade union in South Africa

The Garment and Allied Workers' Union of South Africa (GAWU) was a trade union representing clothing workers in South Africa.

The union was established on 5 December 1987, when the Garment Workers' Industrial Union merged with the Garment Workers' Union of the Western Province. It initially had 102,000 members, the large majority in Natal, but also with some strength in Western Cape. The new union requested affiliation to the Congress of South African Trade Unions (COSATU). However, the COSATU's policy was that there should only be one union per industry, and so asked GAWU to merge with the Amalgamated Clothing and Textile Workers' Union of South Africa (ACTWUSA). In the meantime, it granted it only observer status.

Under the leadership of Desmond Sampson, the union took more radical positions than either of its forerunners. It engaged in major strikes during 1988, and during the year, it also absorbed the South African Textile and Allied Workers' Union. On 16 September 1989, it completed a merger with ACTWUSA, to form the Southern African Clothing and Textile Workers Union.
