= Administrative, Technical and Electronic Association of South Africa =

Trade union in South Africa

The Administrative, Technical and Electronic Association of South Africa (ATEASA) was a trade union representing supervisory workers in South Africa.

The union was established in 1996, when the Administrative and Technical Officials' Association merged with the South African Technical Officials' Association. The South African Electrical Workers' Association was involved in the merger negotiations, but decided against affiliating. The union affiliated with the Federation of South African Labour Unions. Simon Moshesh was elected as the union's president, and Koos Bezuidenhout as its managing director.

On 1 April 1998, the union merged with the Officials' Association of South Africa, to form the United Association of South Africa.
