= National Union of Textile Workers (South Africa) =

Trade union in South Africa

Logo of the union

The National Union of Textile Workers (NUTW) was a trade union representing workers in the textile industry in South Africa.

The union was established in September 1973, following a series of strikes in Durban. The union welcomed workers of all ethnicities, which meant that it was unable to register with the Government of South Africa. Many of the union's leaders were detained, including acting general secretary Halton Cheadle, who was subsequently banned from holding any trade union office. The union had to collect subscription by hand and struggled to gain any recognition from employers, but in 1974 it signed a formal recognition with Smith and Nephew, the first such agreement in the country. After 53 legal cases, it finally also obtained recognition from the Frame group. Its main focus was establishing shop stewards' councils in each workplace.

In 1979, the union became a founding affiliate of the Federation of South African Trade Unions (FOSATU), and this encouraged it to spread beyond Natal, organising workers across the nation. In 1985, FOSATU became part of the new Congress of South African Trade Unions (COSATU), with the NUTW transferring over. In 1987, it merged with the National Union of Garment Workers and the Textile Workers' Industrial Union, to form the Amalgamated Clothing and Textile Workers' Union of South Africa.

== General Secretaries ==
1973: June-Rose Nala
1970s: Obed Zuma
1982: John Copelyn
