= National Union of Furniture and Allied Workers =

Trade union in South Africa

The National Union of Furniture and Allied Workers (NUFAW) is a trade union representing workers in the furniture industry in South Africa.

The union was founded in 1956, as a split from the Furniture Workers' Industrial Union, which restricted itself to white workers. NUFAW initially represented only "coloured" workers in the industry. It affiliated to the South African Confederation of Labour, and by 1962 was its only affiliate to represent non-white workers. It later transferred to the Trade Union Council of South Africa (TUCSA), and had 7,186 members by 1970. In 1974, it absorbed the Furniture Workers' Industrial Union. In 1980, it began admitting all workers, and grew to 21,665 members by the end of the year.

TUCSA dissolved in 1986, and NUFAW then joined the new National Council of Trade Unions. However, it was regarded as being considerably more conservative than the majority of unions in the new federation.
