= Co-ordinating Council of South African Trade Unions =

South African trade union federation

The Co-ordinating Council of South African Trade Unions (CCSATU) was a national trade union federation of white workers in South Africa.

The South African Trades and Labour Council (SAT&LC) included all unions, but a minority of its affiliates opposed the affiliates of unions of black workers. Five unions of white workers resigned from the SAT&LC in 1947, and in 1948 they founded the Co-ordinating Council of South African Trade Unions. It was supportive of apartheid, and its development was encouraged by the National Party.

In 1957, the federation affiliated to the South African Confederation of Labour (SACOL). By 1962, it had 13 affiliates, with a total of 40,221 members. As SACOL became more centralised, CCSATU declined in importance, and it appears to have dissolved around 1980.

| Union | Membership (1962) |
|---|---|
| Association of State Sawmill and Forestry Workers of South Africa | 539 |
| Bank Employees' Association | 2,326 |
| Cement and Clay Workers' Organisation of South Africa | 226 |
| Die Spoorbond | 12,223 |
| European Building Workers' Union | 5,499 |
| European Textile Workers' Industrial Union of South Africa | 204 |
| Glass Manufacturing Workers' Union | 445 |
| Match Workers' Union of South Africa | 252 |
| Orange Free State Road Builders' Union | 745 |
| Provincial Co-workers' Association | 2,300 |
| Provincial Domestic Staff Association | 132 |
| South African Iron and Steel Trades Association | 15,000 |
| Transvaal Transport Workers' Union | 330 |
