= Mine Surface Officials' Association =

Trade union in South Africa

The Mine Surface Officials' Association (MSOA) was a trade union representing supervisors in the mining industry in South Africa who did not work underground.

The union was founded in 1919, inspired by the Underground Officials' Association (UOA) which had been established the previous year. It avoided strike action or political activity, although some of its members participated in an unofficial strike in 1920. The union later affiliated to the Trade Union Council of South Africa, and by 1980 it had 13,868 members.

The union's general secretary, Robie Botha, became concerned that its closed shop agreement would not survive, and that it should therefore merge with other unions in the industry. He recruited Koos Bezuidenhout as a new general secretary in 1995, Botha moving to become chief executive. In 1996, Bezuidenhout became executive president. He began accepting supervisory workers in the metal and engineering industries, and renamed the union as the Administrative and Technical Association of South Africa. Near the end of the year, it merged with the South African Technical Officials' Association, to form the Administrative, Technical and Electronic Association of South Africa.
