= A. L. Clark =

Alex Lindsay Clark (born 24 July 1856) was a Scottish-born South African trade union leader and broadcaster.

Born in Carnoustie in Scotland, Clark was educated at the Free Church Grammar School. He emigrated to Durban in 1881, where he worked on the railways for many years. He joined the Natal Railwaymen's Association, serving as its president in 1907/08, and then in 1918 was the founding president of the National Union of Railways and Harbour Services.

In 1907, Clark was the founding president of the Natal Labour Party, serving until its merger into the new South African Labour Party in 1910, but he decided against joining the new party. He served on Durban Town Council, on which he advocated a land value tax, which was eventually adopted in the town.

Clark retired from the railways in the early 1920s, becoming president of the Workers' Educational Association, and becoming one of the first prominent speakers on the radio in South Africa.
