= Motor Industry Staff Association =

Trade union in South Africa

- Formation: 1929; 97 years ago
- Type: Trade union
- Registration no.: LR2/6/2/1226
- Headquarters: Johannesburg, Gauteng, South Africa
- Region served: South Africa
- Fields: Automotive industry
- Members: 79,000 (2026)
- Official language: English
- Key people: Martlé Keyter and Hermann Köstens (Co-CEOs)
- Affiliations: Motor Industry Bargaining Council (MIBCO)
- Funding: Membership subscriptions
- Website: misa.org.za
- Formerly called: The Motor Industry Trade Union (MITU)

The Motor Industry Staff Association (MISA) is a trade union representing workers in the automotive industry in South Africa.

Founded in 1929, the organization is headquartered in Johannesburg. As of 2026, it represents a total of 79,000 members.

== History ==
The union was founded under its former name, the Motor Industry Trade Union (MITU), in June 1929 in Bloemfontein, to represent white collar workers. For many years, it only admitted white workers.

In December 1939, MITU merged with the Cape Motor Industry Employees' Union (established in 1933) to form the Motor Industry Employees' Union of South Africa (MIEU). By 1949, the organization had switched to the name of the Motor Industry Staff Association (MISA).

MISA registered as a trade union with the then-Department of Labour in February 1951.

By 1985, the union had affiliated to the Federation of South African Labour Unions, and by 1996 it had grown to 20,000 members. In 1997, it was a founding affiliate of the Federation of Unions of South Africa.

In 2003, MISA absorbed the Motor Industry Employees' Union, which represented technical workers in the industry.

By 2008, MISA had merged with the South African Motor Union (SAMU), and was officially using the new name of MISA/SAMU.

In March 2009, the union switched to its current name, the Motor Industry Staff Association (MISA).

By 2019, MISA had grown to 50,000 members. In 2023, this had reached over 61,000 members.

== See also ==
- Automotive industry in South Africa
