= United National Transport Union =

Trade union in South Africa

The United National Transport Union (UNTU) is a trade union representing transport workers in South Africa.

The union was founded on 22 June 2012, when the United Transport and Allied Trade Union merged with the South African Railways and Harbours Union. Like both its predecessors, it affiliated to the Federation of Unions of South Africa. The union was initially known as UTATU SARWHU, but became UNTU in 2014.

As of 2019, UNTU had about 60,000 members, and was led by general secretary Steve Harris.
