= Johanna Cornelius =

South African trade unionist (1912–1974)

- Born: Johanna Catharina Cornelius; 27 February 1912; Lichtenburg, South Africa
- Died: 21 June 1974 (aged 62); Johannesburg, South Africa
- Occupations: Trade unionist, garment worker
- Organization: Garment Workers' Union of South Africa (GWU)

Johanna Catharina Cornelius (27 February 1912 – 21 June 1974) was an Afrikaner activist and trade unionist. She served as the Afrikaner Garment Workers' Union of South Africa (GWU) president after Solly Sachs.

== Biography ==
Cornelius was born in Lichtenburg, South Africa, and grew up in rural South Africa as one of nine children. Her father and grandfather both fought in the Anglo Boer War and her mother was held in a concentration camp during the war. She and her older sister, Hester Cornelius, moved to Johannesburg in the 1920s, where Johanna eventually started working in a garment factory. Cornelius worked as a machinist in the factory.

Cornelius was arrested and detained in jail for several house in 1932 while participating in a GWU strike. After she was released from jail, she spoke to the workers and encouraged them to "demand a living wage and freedom." Her speech also referenced the Great Trek and the Anglo Boer War, joining "nationalism together with the class struggle rather than with the national struggle."

She went to the Soviet Union as part of a workers' delegation sponsored by the South African Communist Party (SACP) in 1933. Her trip there helped her learn more about communism and social equality, as well as exposing her to new experiences and political ideologies. When she returned from the Soviet Union, she became a full-time union organizer for GWU, working from the main office in Germiston.

Cornelius worked as the GWU president from 1935 to 1937 and under her leadership, the union won reduced working hours and increased wages for workers. She and Hester also travelled to Cape Town in February 1936 help the GWU branch there.

Cornelius worked to include people of all backgrounds in the union and felt that working in the union had helped her "transcend the racial attitudes" of her past. She later reflected that "it took me years to get used to the notion that even the English – let alone the natives were human beings."

Cornelius was accused in 1938 of being a "communist accomplice of Sachs and for spending all her time organising black people." She defended her socialism as the logical outcome of Afrikaner resistance to the "imperialist yoke," and was able to successfully fight off attempts by Afrikaner nationalists who wanted to take control of the union.

She became a founder of the National Union of Cigarette and Tobacco Workers in 1938, later leading a two-week strike in Rustenburg in September 1940. The strike in Rustenberg was "heated" and women in the strike faced tear gas and police attacks. In 1943 she ran unsuccessfully as an Independent Labor Party candidate.

Under the Suppression of Communism Act (1950) Cornelius and Sachs were listed as communists. When Sachs was exiled from South Africa in 1952, she took over the GWU and worked that position until her death.

Cornelius died on 21 June 1974 in Johannesburg.

== Sources ==
- Berger, Iris (1992). Threads of Solidarity: Women in South African Industry, 1900-1980. Indiana University Press. ISBN 9780852550779.
