= National Union of Garment Workers =

Trade union in South Africa

The National Union of Garment Workers (NUGW) was a trade union representing clothing workers in South Africa.

The union was established in 1985, when the Garment Workers' Union of South Africa (GWUSA) merged with the National Union of Clothing Workers (NUCW). The two unions had worked together for nearly twenty years, but as the GWUSA represented white and coloured workers, and the NUCW represented black workers, the two had not previously been permitted to merge. The new union had about 32,000 members.

The union was initially affiliated to the Trade Union Council of South Africa, but it resigned in 1986, arguing that the council was not supportive of commemorations of May Day and the Soweto uprising. In 1987, it merged with the National Union of Textile Workers and the Textile Workers' Industrial Union, to form the Amalgamated Clothing and Textile Workers' Union of South Africa.
