= Independent Municipal & Allied Trade Union =

Trade union in South Africa

IMATU
- Independent Municipal and Allied Trade Union
- Founded: 8 March 1996
- Headquarters: Pretoria, South Africa
- Location: South Africa
- Members: 105,000 (2022)
- Key people: Johan Koen, General Secretary, Keith Swanepoel President
- Affiliations: None
- Website: www.imatu.co.za

The Independent Municipal & Allied Trade Union (IMATU) is a trade union in South Africa. It has a membership of 107,000 and is the largest politically independent trade union in the local government sector.

The Union was founded on 8 March 1996, with the merger of five unions:

- Durban Municipal Employees' Association
- Johannesburg Municipal Employees' Association
- National Union of Employees of Local Authorities
- South African Association of Municipal Employees
- South African Local Authorities and Allied Workers' Union

It originally affiliated to the Federation of South African Labour Unions, then to its successor, the Federation of Unions of South Africa, but it is now independent.
