= Garment Workers' Industrial Union =

Trade union in South Africa

The Garment Workers' Industrial Union (GWIU) was a trade union representing clothing workers in South Africa.

The union was established on 2 August 1934 by James Bolton in Natal. Bolton was already the leader of the Furniture Workers' Industrial Union.

In 1936, the Natal Industrial Council was founded, on which the GWIU played a leading role, and it achieved an agreement on pay and conditions, which was extended to black workers in 1937. The union also established a fund for sick workers the following year, and an unemployment fund in the 1940s. Although the union did not accept black workers as members, in 1948 it set up a parallel union for them, and employed Amos Dube as its organiser.

In 1964, James Bolton died, and the leadership of the union was taken over by his wife, Harriet. In 1971, she organised a protest of 31,000 workers over low pay, and also opened new offices for the union, named Bolton Hall. The following year, she founded the General Factory Workers' Benefit Fund. In 1974, she threatened to withdraw the GWIU from the Trade Union Council of South Africa (TUCSA) over the council's reluctance to organise black workers. This lost her the support of the rest of the union's leadership, and she resigned.

By 1980, the union had 28,004 members. Soon after, it began accepting black workers as members. In 1986, it resigned from TUCSA, arguing that the council was dominated by white workers and GWIU, which by this point had a negligible white membership was not benefitting from its affiliation. The following year, it was invited to become part of the new Amalgamated Clothing and Textile Workers' Union of South Africa, but it refused to join in sympathy with the Garment Workers' Union of the Western Province (GWU-WP), which was not permitted to join. Instead, on 5 December, it merged with the GWU-WP, to form the Garment and Allied Workers' Union of South Africa.

== General Secretaries ==
1934: James Bolton
1964: Harriet Bolton
1974: M. S. Stanley
1970s: Frank Hansa
1987: Harriet Bolton (acting)
