= Motor Industry Combined Workers' Union =

Trade union in South Africa

The Motor Industry Combined Workers' Union (MICWU) was a trade union representing workers in vehicle manufacturing and servicing, and also petrol attendants, in South Africa.

The union was founded in 1961, to represent "coloured" workers who had previously been part of the Motor Industry Employees' Union, as the unions were compelled to divide on racial lines. The new union affiliated to the Trade Union Council of South Africa, and by 1980, it had 13,135 members. That year, it absorbed the Motor Industries Union of South Africa, which it had previously established to represent black workers.

In 1987, under the leadership of Des East, the union merged with the Metal and Allied Workers' Union, the National Automobile and Allied Workers' Union and the United Metal, Mining and Allied Workers of South Africa, to form the National Union of Metalworkers of South Africa.
