= South African Engine Drivers' and Firemen's Association =

Trade union in South Africa

The South African Engine Drivers' and Firemen's Association (SAEDFA) was a trade union representing people involved in operating engines in South Africa.

The union was founded in 1895 in the Transvaal, and its membership was originally based in the mines. In 1902, Peter Whiteside was elected as its general secretary. The union affiliated to the South African Trades Union Congress, and by 1926 had 1,230 members.

The union affiliated to the South African Trades and Labour Council in the early 1940s, and by 1947 had 2,616 members. However, it resigned in 1951 to join the right-wing split, the South African Federation of Trade Unions (SAFTU). By 1962, it had 4,538 members. SAFTU became part of the South African Confederation of Labour, and by 1980, the union, with 7,000 members, had lengthened its name to the South African Engine Drivers', Firemen's and Operators' Association.

In 1990, the union merged into the South African Boilermakers' Society.
