= Artisan Staff Association =

Trade union in South Africa

The Artisan Staff Association (ASA) was a trade union representing higher-paid technical railway workers in South Africa.

The union was established in 1924, on the initiative of the National Shop Stewards' Association. It attempted to register with the Government of South Africa in 1926, but was rejected due to opposition from smaller, sectional, unions of technical railway workers. The union avoided strikes, a position popular with many railway workers following the defeat of a major strike in 1914.

Despite its marginalisation, the union survived by collaborating closely with the South African Railways and Harbours Salaried Staff Association, and from 1928 as part of the new Federal Consultative Council of South African Railways and Harbours Staff Associations. It was finally permitted to register in 1930, and survived the depression by arguing that members should be downgraded rather than laid off.

From the 1950s, the Federal Consultative Council was affiliated to the all-white South African Confederation of Labour (SACOL). The ASA resigned from SACOL in 1976, joining the more moderate Trade Union Council of South Africa in 1981. By 1980, it had 22,500 members. Later in the decade, it transferred again, this time to the Federation of South African Labour Unions (FEDSAL). In 1996, it was down to 15,500 members, all of whom were white.

In 1993, the union opened up membership to all technical railway workers, regardless of perceived skill level, and it accordingly changed its name to the Technical Workers' Union (TWU). Following lengthy talks, in 2000 it finally merged with the South African Footplate Staff Association, forming the United Transport and Allied Trade Union.
