= Federation of Free African Trade Unions of South Africa =

South African trade union federation

The Federation of Free African Trade Unions of South Africa (FOFATUSA) was a national trade union federation for unions representing black workers in South Africa.

== History ==
Unions representing black workers were not permitted to affiliate to the Trade Union Council of South Africa (TUCSA), as in order to register with the Government of South Africa, it only admitted unions representing white and "coloured" workers. While many unions of black workers joined the left-wing South African Congress of Trade Unions, five more right-wing unions remained informally linked with TUCSA affiliates. Late in 1959, they decided to form their own federation, FOFATUSA.

FOFATUSA was linked with the Pan-African Congress, and also affiliated to the International Confederation of Free Trade Unions, which funded many of its activities. Lucy Mvubelo was appointed as its president, while Jacob Nyaose became its general secretary, and Sarah Chitja was national secretary.

While the federation aimed to expand its activities, this did not occur. By 1962, its fifteen affiliates had a total of only 17,280 members. That year, TUCSA permitted unions of black workers to affiliate, and FOFATUSA declined. It was dissolved in 1966, with its remaining affiliates transferring to TUCSA.

== Affiliates ==
In 1962, the federation had the following affiliates:

Union	Membership (1962)
African Bakers' Industrial Union	3,000
African Broom and Brush Workers' Union	500
African Motor Industry Union	200
African Railway Workers' Union	530
African Sheet Workers' Union	400
African Tobacco Workers' Union	4,000
Garment Workers' Union of African Women	6,740
General Workers' Union (Durban)	153
General Workers' Union (Johannesburg)	300
General Workers' Union (Pretoria)	150
Match and Allied Workers' Union	113
Quarry and Slate Workers' Union	247
Salt and Allied Workers' Union	150
Soap, Candle and Edible Oils Union	300
