= Pieter Grobbelaar (politician) =

South African politician (born 1944)

Member of the National Assembly
- In office May 1994 – June 1999

Personal details
- Born: Pieter Willem Grobbelaar; 13 September 1944 (age 81)
- Citizenship: South Africa
- Party: Freedom Front

Pieter Willem Grobbelaar (born 13 September 1944) is a retired South African politician who represented the Freedom Front (FF) in the National Assembly from 1994 to 1999. He was elected in the 1994 general election, as one of the party's nine representatives in the assembly.

Though he stood for re-election in 1999, he was ranked eighth on the FF's national party list and therefore failed to gain re-election.
