= South African Industrial Federation =

South African trade union federation

The South African Industrial Federation (SAIF) was established in 1914 as an amalgamation of the Industrial Federations in the provinces of South Africa.

The federation attracted most of the trades unions in the country. It had a policy of support for white labour, believing that employers had a policy of using black labour to drive down wages. The Cape Federation of Labour Unions which represented many coloured workers refused to do so.

It was led by Archie Crawford, and its membership reached 60,000. It was active in the Rand Rebellion in 1922, but it largely collapsed following the defeat of the associated general strike. The remnants of the federation attempted to reform as a single general union, the South African Industrial Union, but the government refused it permission to register, and it soon dissolved. Instead, the federation was replaced in 1924 by the South African Trades Union Council.
