= Peter Whiteside (politician) =

South African trade union leader and politician

Peter Whiteside (12 May 1870 – 19 September 1929) was an Australian-born South African trade union leader and politician.

Born in Ballarat, Whiteside was educated in Melbourne before becoming a mechanic on the city's cable tramway system. In 1893, he emigrated to the South African Republic, becoming an engine driver. Three years later, he was the founder secretary of the Benoni branch of the Engine Drivers' and Firemen's Association, also becoming a delegate to the union's executive council. He served as a quartermaster during the Second Boer War.

After the war, Whiteside returned to the railways, until in 1902, he was elected as general secretary of his union. In the same year, he founded the Witwatersrand Trades and Labour Council, serving as its president for two years. He championed the construction of the Johannesburg Trades Hall, and served on a Labour Commission, on which he signed a minority report opposing Chinese immigration.

In 1903, Whiteside was elected to Johannesburg Town Council, and he was also one of the first working-class magistrates in the country. In 1907, he was elected to the new Transvaal Legislative Assembly, in the Siemert division, becoming the leader of the Transvaal Independent Labour Party group. In 1910, he was a founding member of the Labour Party, and he was appointed to the first Senate of South Africa.

Whiteside stood down from his trade union posts in 1919. In 1925, he resigned from the Senate to become a Railway Commissioner, serving until his death in 1929.
