= Amalgamated Union of Building Trade Workers of South Africa =

South African trade union for the construction industry

The Amalgamated Union of Building Trade Workers of South Africa (AUBTWSA) is a trade union representing workers in the construction industry in South Africa.

The union was founded in 1916 as the Building Workers' Industrial Union (BWIU), with the aim of uniting all construction workers in the country. The Operative Bricklayers' Society merged in, and its former chair, Jimmy Briggs, became the union's first chairman. By 1926, it had 2,000 members, mostly in Transvaal and Natal.

In its early years, the union's leadership was predominantly left-wing. The early programme of the union was influenced by syndicalism, with the stated aim of developing “sufficient knowledge and power to enable the Union ultimately to control effectively the Building Industry in the interests of the Workers”. C.B. Tyler, general secretary from 1921 to 1943, was a former syndicalist, then a founder of the South African Communist Party, and remained on the left after leaving the party. Many in the executive, however, moved to the right in the 1930s and 1940s.

The union grew steadily: by 1946 its membership was 8,327, about half in Transvaal. Its branches in Transvaal and the Orange Free State only accepted white workers, but those in Natal and the Cape also organised coloureds and Indians. Some white members objected to this policy, especially outside the Cape, and there was also no effort to organise black Africans.

However, efforts to make the union for whites-only were consistently defeated, and it retained a mixed membership. It was affiliated to the South African Trades and Labour Council. Afrikaner nationalist groups attempted to win over the union, but were unsuccessful.

After Tyler died in 1943, he was succeeded by Billy Blake, also a founder member of the union. At the end of the 1940s, the union merged with the Amalgamated Bricklayers' Trade Union of South Africa, and in 1951 it renamed itself as the "Amalgamated Union of Building Trade Workers of South Africa".

It remained predominantly English-speaking, but the Afrikaner communist Piet Huyser served as its national organiser of the union from 1948 onwards. Huyser was banned from activity in the union in 1953 in terms of the Suppression of Communism Act, 1950.

In 1972, the union absorbed the Coloured, Malay and Asiatic Building Workers' Union, followed in 1980 by the majority of the Amalgamated Society of Woodworkers of South Africa. This took its membership up to 19,000. In 1991, it was a founding affiliate of the short-lived Federation of Independent Trade Unions. The union was still in existence in 2017.
