= South African Boilermakers' Society =

Trade union in South Africa

The South African Boilermakers', Iron and Steel Workers', Shipbuilders' and Welders' Society (SABS) was a trade union representing metalworkers and shipbuilders in South Africa.

== History ==
The union was established in 1916. Many of its founding members were recent emigrants from England and had held membership of the United Society of Boilermakers, including founding president George Brown, and Ben Caddy, who was general secretary from 1920 to 1950.

The union was successively affiliated to the South African Industrial Federation, the South African Trades Union Council, and the South African Trades and Labour Council. In the 1950s, it played a leading role in the Trade Union Unity Committee, which opposed compulsory splitting of trade unions on racial grounds. It then joined the Trade Union Council of South Africa (TUCSA), and although it disaffiliated in 1977, it rejoined in 1980. By then, it had 18,400 members, and it received permission to admit black workers. As a result, its membership reached 45,000 by the end of 1981.

In 1983, the union again resigned from TUCSA, in protest at the way it favoured the struggles of white workers. Many other unions followed its lead, and TUCSA had to dissolve in 1986. In 1990, it absorbed the South African Engine Drivers', Firemen's and Operators' Association. In 1991, it was a founding affiliate of the Federation of Independent Trade Unions. On 1 August 1995, it merged with the Amalgamated Engineering Union of South Africa, the Engineering, Industrial and Mining Workers' Union, and the Iron Moulders' Society of South Africa, to form the National Employees' Trade Union.

== General Secretaries ==
1920: Ben Caddy
1950:
1954: Tom Murray
1975: Ike van der Walt
