= South African Equity Workers Association =

Trade union in South Africa

The South African Equity Workers' Association (SAEWA) is a general union in South Africa.

The union was founded in 1929, as the Cape Town branch of the British Electrical Trades Union. It registered as an independent trade union, the South African Electrical Workers' Association, in 1939, by which time it had branches in Johannesburg, Durban and the Highveld. It affiliated to the South African Trades and Labour Council (SAT&LC), and by 1947, it had 3,784 members.

After the collapse of the SAT&LC, SAEWA joined the Trade Union Council of South Africa. By 1962, its membership had grown to 8,000 members, all of whom were white. By 1980, it had 17,000 members, and jointly constituted the Federation of Electrical Trades Unions of South Africa with the Electrical and Allied Trade Union of South Africa, representing "coloured" workers, and the Electrical and Allied Workers' Union of South Africa, representing black workers. The other two unions merged in 1987 to form the Electrical and Allied Workers' Trade Union of South Africa, but some SAEWA members were strongly opposed to joining, so it remained independent.

SAEWA decided to broaden its remit, renaming itself as the "South African Equity Workers' Association", and recruiting in a wide variety of industries. It describes its role as focusing on providing professional services to its members.
