= Native Labour (Settlement of Disputes) Act, 1953 =

South African law

Parliament of South Africa
- Long title: Act to provide for the prevention and settlement of native labour disputes and for the regulation of conditions of employment of natives; to amend the Industrial Conciliation Act, 1937, and to provide for other incidental matters.
- Citation: Act No. 48 of 1953
- Enacted by: Parliament of South Africa
- Royal assent: 5 October 1953
- Commenced: 9 October 1953
- Repealed: 1 November 1981
- Administered by: Minister of Labour

Repealed by
- Labour Relations Amendment Act, 1981
- Status: Repealed

The Native Labour (Settlement of Disputes) Act, 1953 (renamed in 1964 to the Bantu Labour (Settlement of Disputes) Act, in 1973 to the Bantu Labour Relations Regulation Act, and in 1978 to the Black Labour Relations Regulation Act) was a South African law that formed part of the apartheid system of racial segregation in South Africa. The effect of the law was to prohibit strike action by black Africans.

== Legislative history ==
In 1942, during World War II, War Measure 145 banned Africans from striking, and imposed a penalty of either a £500 fine, or three years' imprisonment for any breach of this measure. After the conclusion of the war, the measure was renewed at various times. In 1947, an act was proposed which would make "trade unionism illegal and a criminal offence for Africans" in a number of key industries, and ban all strikes by Africans, as well as a number of other restrictions. Although this proposal was not enacted due to the level of opposition it received, a number of the key points were included in the Native Labour (Settlement of Disputes) Act.

The Act repealed War Measure 145, but in essence placed the measure into law, setting up a legal system of "racially segregated trade unions", and made it illegal for Africans to strike under any circumstances. Although the law did not ban Africans from having trade unions, it did not legally recognise them. The South African Minister for Labour, Ben Schoeman explained that the reason for the ban was that the Africans "have not the faintest conception of the responsibilities of trade unionism." The law meant that black Africans had no real way of resisting the demands of their employer. In place of trade unions, the government allowed the creation of workers' committees, to be set up by the employees, and officially registered. Each place of work was permitted only one committee, which was to have no more than five members, in effect preventing true representation. If a committee had a complaint to raise, it was taken to a regional committee, composed of Africans appointed by the Minister for Labour. These regional committees reported to the Black Labour Board, which consisted solely of whites. The legislation came into force on 1 May 1954. An amendment was made to the Act in 1959, which imposed the same penalties for striking as had been present in War Measure 145: a maximum fine of £500 or three years' imprisonment. The Act was weakened by the Bantu Labour Relations Regulation Amendment Act, 1973, which allowed black workers a limited right to strike, and repealed under section 63 of the Labour Relations Amendment Act, 1981.

== Bibliography ==
- Matas, David (1994). No More: The Battle against Human Rights Violations. Toronto: Dundurn Press Ltd. ISBN 1-55002-221-0.
- Bendix, Sonia (2001) [1989]. Industrial relations in South Africa (Fourth ed.). Cape Town: Juta and Company Ltd. ISBN 0-7021-5279-X.
