= Public Servants Association of South Africa =

Trade union in South Africa

PSA
- Public Servants Association of South Africa
- Founded: 7 July 1920
- Headquarters: Pretoria, South Africa
- Location: South Africa
- Members: 245,000
- Key people: Justice Shiburi (President); Reuben Maleka (General Manager)
- Affiliations: FEDUSA
- Website: www.psa.co.za

The Public Servants Association of South Africa (PSA) is a trade union for public sector workers in South Africa.

The PSA is the largest politically non-affiliated trade union for public servants in the country. It was founded in 1920 and has a membership of more than 245,000 members. Long independent, in 2017 it affiliated to the Federation of Unions of South Africa.

As per the Labour Relations Act passed in 1995, the PSA uses collective bargaining to represent its members' interests in labour disputes. Disputes may include negotiating fair terms of remuneration, employee benefits such as medical aid, pension, and housing subsidies, and working conditions such as working hours, leave of absence, and occupational safety and health.
