= Bantu Labour Relations Regulation Amendment Act, 1973 =

The Bantu Labour Relations Regulation Amendment Act, 1973 (Act No. 70 of 1973) was an Act of the South African Parliament in 1973 which amended the Native Labour (Settlement of Disputes) Act, 1953.

It permitted some industrial activity within a restrictive framework of liaison committees and works committees. Liaison committees were consultative. Half of their members were management representatives and half were selected from the workers. Works committees were made up exclusively of workers and their job was to convey workers' demands to the employers. However, they had no power to represent individual workers. There was no legal framework for reaching agreements.

The Act also empowered the Minister to issue a Wages Order setting wages at the employer's request.

2503 liaison committees were established by 1977 - eight times more than works committees.
