= Solly Sachs =

South African trade unionist and activist (1900–1976)

- Born: Emil Solomon Sachs; 11 October 1900; Kamai, Lithuania
- Died: 30 July 1976 (aged 75); London, England
- Occupations: trade unionist, anti-apartheid activist
- Spouse: Rae Ginsberg
- Children: Albie Sachs

Emil Solomon “Solly” Sachs (11 November 1900 – 30 July 1976) was a South African trade unionist and an anti-apartheid activist.

== Early life ==
Solly Sachs was born in 1900 in Kamai, Lithuania, to a Lithuanian-Jewish family. His parents were Abraham Saks and Hannah Rivkin. His early childhood education was in Hebrew and the study of the Talmud. In 1914, he and his family had emigrated to South Africa and settled in Ferreirasdorp, Johannesburg. He left school in Standard 5 and started working as a shop assistant. While on the job, he not only helped organise a union for shop assistants but also continued his studies and worked towards his matric. By 1919, he was active in the Reef Shop Assistants' Union. He had an interest in politics and was drawn to socialism , joining the Communist Party of South Africa in 1919 and the Communist Youth League in 1921. By 1930, Sachs was a member of the Central Committee of the South African Communist Party. He started an engineering degree in 1924 at the University of the Witwatersrand but left to tour the Soviet Union and England before returning to the university to study law, English and economics.

== Marriage ==
Solly married Rae Ginsberg in 1926 and had two sons, one of whom is the anti-apartheid lawyer Albie Sachs. The marriage lasted until 1942 when he married Dulcie Hartwell and had a further son and a foster son, but this second marriage ended in 1951.

== Trade Unionism ==
Known for his unionism, in 1926 he was part of the national executive committee of the South African Trades and Labour Council and by 14 November 1928, secretary of the Witwatersrand Taylors' Association (WTA). Noticing that women garment workers, consisting of working class Afrikaners, were not represented on union committees, he became general secretary of the WTA, changing its constitution in July 1929, and renaming it the Garment Workers' Union of South Africa (GWU) in 1930. He encouraged the Afrikaner women to become activists and organisers. Its membership during 1930/31 stood at 1700 members, two-thirds were garment workers, made up mostly of Afrikaner women, though men made up the union committee, but this would change, and by 1939, all were women. The early years in this union involved defending work conditions and employment security in the garment industry. Using the courts and strikes, he ensured garment workers' wages increased from 23s/week in 1928 to £2/week by 1938, paid leave rose from three days to ten, they received morning and afternoon breaks and created a sick fund. By 1938, GWU membership had grown to 7000 members.

Because of his socialist views, he ran into difficulties with the Communist Party of South Africa, which believed his union activities were not revolutionary enough, and so he was expelled from the party in 1931.

He managed two GWU general strikes in 1931 over wage negotiations and again in 1932 when the over wage negotiations broke down. These strikes resulted in his arrest and later banning from the Witwatersrand for twelve months by Justice Minister Oswald Pirow which would later be reduced to six months by Jan Smuts. Pirow had used the strike as back drop to a by-election his Nationalist party was attempting to win in Germiston by describing the strike as communist inspired.

His control of the GWU would bring him into conflict with the Afrikaner nationalist elite during the preparations for the 1938 Great Trek Centenary when Afrikaner female garment union workers wished to take part when this elite attempted to discourage their participation. They were regarded by the Afrikaner elite as poor and passive victims of Jewish communism unable to stand-up for themselves which was going to destroy the Afrikaner people. They would later be accepted to join the Trek celebrations if they participated as members of the volk (the people) and not as members of the GWU.

Sachs help form a fund for unemployed clothing workers who had been excluded from the Unemployment Insurance Fees (UIF) enacted in 1939, their inclusion would only occur later in 1946. In 1946, Sachs joined the South African Labour Party and by 1952 he had become their national treasurer. During the 1948 South African elections, which the National Party later won, the Nationalists would use Solly Sachs influence in the GWU as an example of the threat of communism in South Africa.

In May 1952, the Apartheid governments Minister of Justice, C.R. Swart served two notices on Sachs in relation to the Suppression of Communism Act 1950. He was ordered to resign from the GWU in 30 days and banned from various organisations and secondly he was restricted to the Transvaal and from attending meetings. Later that same month he was arrested after attending a protest meeting by the GWU in Johannesburg which was broken up by the police. After leaving court he attended another protest a few days later and was again arrested and bailed, later sentenced in July to two offences of six months hard labour suspended for two years. Sachs had not been a member of the CPSA for many years when he and many others had been purged from the party in the 1930s.

== Exile ==
Solly went into exile in England on 30 January 1953. He took up a two-year fellowship at the University of Manchester and a years research post at the University of London. He also ran unsuccessfully as a Labour candidate in Sheffield. He continued to protest against the South African government in London after his son Albie was arrested and demonstrated again in 1961 against the Sharpeville massacre. He would die in London on 30 July 1976.

== Books by Solly Sachs ==
- The Choice before South Africa (1952)
- Garment workers in Action (1957)
- Rebels Daughters (1957)
- The South African Treason Trial (1959)
- The Anatomy of Apartheid (1965)

== See also ==
- Johanna Cornelius
