= Furniture Workers' Industrial Union =

Trade union in South Africa

The Furniture Workers' Industrial Union (FWIU) was a trade union representing workers involved in making furniture in South Africa.

The union was established in 1925, when a small craft union in the Transvaal decided to reorganise itself as the Furniture Workers' Union, admitting all workers in the industry. It affiliated to the South African Trades Union Congress and also began recruiting Asian and "coloured" workers. It collaborated with the Furniture, Mattress and Bedding Workers' Union, which represented black workers in the industry.

From 1930, the union was affiliated to the Trade Union Council of South Africa, and it also joined the Co-ordinating Council of Furniture Trade Unions of South Africa. During the 1940s, it became increasingly right-wing and opposed to black trade unionism, and in 1956, its Asian and "coloured" members left, to form the National Union of Furniture and Allied Workers (NUFAW). By 1974, the FWIU was significantly smaller than NUFAW, and it merged into that union.
