= South African Iron and Steel Trades Association =

Trade union in South Africa

The South African Iron and Steel Trades Association (SAISTA; Afrikaans: Suid Afrikaanse Yster en Staalbedryfsvereniging) was a trade union representing white metalworkers in South Africa.

The union was founded in 1936, with support from the Nasionale Raad van Trustees. It initially had only 300 members, but grew steadily, becoming particularly associated with Afrikaners. It attempted to form a trade union federation restricted to white workers, but was unable to do so, and instead in 1944 affiliated to the South African Trades and Labour Council (SAT&LC).

Within the SAT&LC, the union argued against representation for black workers, and in 1947 it resigned over the issue. The following year, it was a founding affiliate of the all-white Co-ordinating Council of South African Trade Unions, and then from 1957 part of the larger South African Confederation of Labour (SACOL). By 1976, it had 36,000 members, and was the largest union of white workers.

Around 1980, the union renamed itself as the South African Iron, Steel and Allied Industries Union. In 1993, it was a founding affiliate of the Afrikaner Volksfront. However, by this point it was regarded as less extreme than the other SACOL affiliates. It became independent and renamed itself as the South African Workers' Union, also opening up membership to workers of all racial backgrounds. This led those members who wished to maintain an exclusively white union to defect to the Mine Workers' Union (MWU). In 2001, it merged into the MWU, which renamed itself as "Solidarity".
