= National Union of Leather and Allied Workers =

Trade union in South Africa

The National Union of Leather and Allied Workers (NULAW) is a trade union representing workers in the leather and shoemaking industries in South Africa.

The union was founded in 1924 as the National Union of Leather Workers, and registered with the government in 1926. That year, it established a national bargaining council with the Footwear Manufacturers' Association. It initially accepted all workers, regardless of ethnicity, but in 1946 it created a separate union for black workers, the African Leather Workers' Union.

By 1970, the union was affiliated with the Trade Union Council of South Africa, and by 1980 it had 20,810 members. Employment in the industry has since fallen significantly. It is currently affiliated to the Federation of Unions of South Africa.
