= Textile Workers' Industrial Union =

Trade union in South Africa

The Textile Workers' Industrial Union (TWIU) was a trade union representing workers in the textile industry in South Africa.

The union was founded in 1935 and affiliated to the South African Trades and Labour Council. It was unusual in that it admitted both black and white workers, and in Cape Town and Harrismith, they formed part of the same branches. This position was championed by the union's general secretary, Roy du Preez. In 1942, it helped reorganise the African Laundry Workers' Union. In 1950, the union was banned from representing both black and white workers, and so it formed the African Textile Workers' Industrial Union to represent black workers. In 1954, its white members split away to form a racial union.

The surviving union affiliated to the Trade Union Council of South Africa. In 1987, it merged with the National Union of Textile Workers and the National Union of Garment Workers, to form the Amalgamated Clothing and Textile Workers' Union of South Africa.
