= South African Confederation of Labour =

The South African Confederation of Labour (SACOL) was a national trade union federation of white workers in South Africa.

== History ==
The federation was established in 1957, as a loose body bringing together the South African Federation of Trade Unions, the Co-ordinating Council of South African Trade Unions, the Federal Consultative Council of South African Railways and Harbours Staff Associations, and the Trade Union Council of South Africa (TUCSA). TUCSA withdrew in 1958, and the remaining federation was broadly supportive of apartheid.

In 1968, the federation decided to permit individual unions to affiliate. These unions gradually came to operate on an equal footing to the remaining affiliated federations, and this led the Federal Consultative Council to disaffiliate in 1975, although all but one of its own affiliates decided to sign up individually to SACOL. This took the federation's membership to a maximum of 25 unions with 206,511 members.

While the Government of South Africa allowed unions to represent both white and "coloured" workers, and from 1980, black workers as well, SACOL only permitted unions restricted to white workers to affiliate. In 1980, it expelled the South African Technical Officials' Association, after it permitted coloured workers to join, and this led some other affiliates to resign in order to expand their own membership. Membership of the federation then fell steadily. In 1992, its largest remaining affiliate, the Mine Workers' Union, disaffiliated in order to become a general union. The federation was reduced to only five affiliates with 40,280 members.

== Affiliates ==
Union	Abbreviation	Founded	Left	Reason not affiliated	Membership (1980)
Artisan Staff Association	ASA	1924	1976	Disaffiliated	22,500
Blanke Bouwerkersvakbond		1949	After 1995		7,412
Blanke Distribuisiewerkersvereniging			1970s	Dissolved	N/A
Blanketekstiel Werkers Nywerheids			1970s	Dissolved	N/A
Die Spoorbond		1933			6,300
Durban Municipal Employees' Society	DMES	1919	1980	Disaffiliated	4,000
Explosives and Chemical Workers' Union			1977	Merged into SAEDFOA	N/A
Johannesburg Municipal Employees' Association	JMEA	1916	1980	Disaffiliated	5,800
Mine Workers' Union	MWU	1902	1991	Disaffiliated	17,000
National Association of Furniture and Allied Workers		1961	1980	Disaffiliated	750
OVS Provinsiale Werkersvereeniging			1978	Disaffiliated	243
Pretoriase Vakbond Vir Die Kleinhandel Vleisbedryf	PVKV				200
Provinsiale Huishoudlike Personeelvereniging			1978	Disaffiliated	250
Provinsiale Medewerkersvereniging					3,462
South African Association of Municipal Employees	SAAME	1919	1980	Transferred to FEDSAL	41,492
South African Diamond Workers' Union	SADWU				801
South African Engine Drivers', Firemen's and Operators' Association	SAEDFOA	1895	1990	Merged into SABS	7,000
South African Footplate Staff Association	SAFSA	1905	1975	Disaffiliated	9,331
South African Iron, Steel and Allied Industries Union	SAISAIU	1948	1994	Disaffiliated	38,486
South African Karweierswerknemersvereniging			After 1995		465
South African Railways and Harbours Employees' Union	SAR&HEU	1924	After 1995		12,381
South African Railways and Harbours Running and Operational Staff Union	ROSU		1985	Disaffiliated	7,835
South African Railways and Harbours Salaried Staff Association	SALSTAFF	1918		Disaffiliated	27,545
South African Railways Police Staff Association			1981	Disaffiliated	2,922
South African Technical Officials' Association	SATOA		1980	Expelled	3,000
Transvaalse Transportwerkers Unie					300
Vereeniging Van Staatsaagmeul And Boswerkers Van South Africa			1981	Dissolved	269
Volkskas Amptenare Vereniging			1980	Disaffiliated	6,770
Vuurhoutjiewekrers Vakbond Van South Africa			1979	Dissolved	N/A
West Rand Administration Board Personnel Association		1975			1,102
