= UASA =

Trade union in South Africa

- UASA The Union
- Founded: 1 April 1998
- Headquarters: Florida, Johannesburg
- Location: South Africa
- Members: 30,000 (2011)
- Key people: Jacques Hugo (CEO)(GS)
- Affiliations: FEDUSA
- Website: www.uasa.org.za

The UASA is a general union in South Africa.

== Background ==
The union was founded on 1 April 1998, when the Administrative, Technical and Electronic Association of South Africa merged with the Underground Officials' Association. It affiliated to the Federation of Unions of South Africa (FEDUSA). It was initially named the United Association of South Africa, and while its membership was focused in mining, it accepted workers in all industries. This allowed it to absorb the Hairdressers' and Cosmetologists' Trade Unions in 2000, followed by the South African Diamond Workers' Union, and the Staff Association for the Motor and Related Industries, both in 2001.

In 2002, the union absorbed SALSTAFF, and this took its membership to 65,000, making it easily FEDUSA's largest affiliate. In April 2003, the union absorbed the National Employees' Trade Union. Membership peaked at 110,000 in 2004, and has since slowly declined, in line with employment in the mining industry.

UASA is registered at the Department of Labour as a trade union in accordance with the Labour Relations Act 66 of 1995 as amended in 2002. It has a membership of approximately 75,000 and is affiliated with the Federation of Unions of South Africa (FEDUSA) which represents approximately 556,000 members.

UASA also plays an important role in the international labour arena, joining hands with various international federations that promote global solidarity among workers of the world in their struggle against the negative effects of globalisation. Through its affiliation with IndustriALL, ITF and the International Trade Union Confederation (ITUC), UASA has active representation at various international forums.

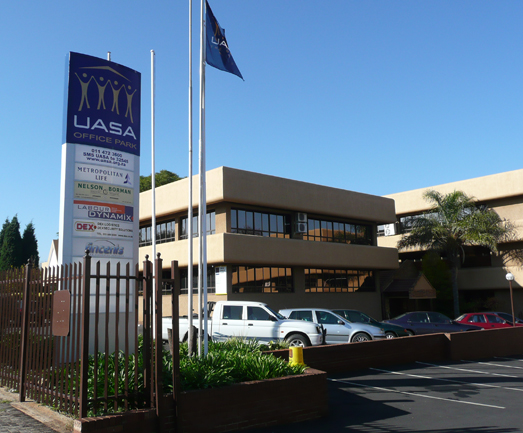
UASA's headquarters in Florida, Johannesburg

== Affiliates ==
UASA is affiliated with www.fedusa.org.za

The South African Guild of Actors is also affiliated with UASA.

== See also ==
- Trade unions in South Africa
