= Salaried Staff Association =

Trade union in South Africa

The Salaried Staff Association (SALSTAFF) was a trade union representing railway workers in South Africa.

The union was founded in 1918, as the South African Railways and Harbours Salaried Staff Association, and long represented only white workers. In 1928, it was a leading founder of the Federal Consultative Council of South African Railways and Harbours Staff Associations, which from the 1950s was affiliated to the all-white South African Confederation of Labour. By 1980, it had 27,545 members.

By the early 1990s, the union had transferred to the Federation of South African Labour Unions, its membership dropping to 16,000 in 1992. In 1997, it became an affiliate of the Federation of Unions of South Africa In 2002, it merged into the United Association of South Africa.
