= Underground Officials' Association =

Trade union representing mining supervisors in South Africa

The Underground Officials' Association (UOA) was a trade union representing supervisors in the mining industry in South Africa.

The union was founded in 1918. It accepted only white workers, and prided itself on not operating a closed shop and never holding a strike. It registered with the Government of South Africa in 1924. By 1980, it had 14,462 members, and that year, it began accepting all workers holding supervisory positions in the mines.

In 1983, the union finally agreed with the government to open all mining supervisory positions to non-white workers. By 1985, it had affiliated to the Federation of Salaried Staff Associations. It had obtained a closed shop agreement, but deputy general secretary Koos Bezuidenhout believed that this would not endure, and that it should merge with other unions in the industry. General secretary Rennier de Waal opposed the idea, but despite this, the African Explosives Company Incorporated Staff Association, and the Industrial Salaried Staff Association, merged in, and the union renamed itself as the Officials' Association of South Africa (OASA).

On 1 April 1998, the union merged with the Administrative, Technical and Electronic Association of South Africa, to form the United Association of South Africa.
