= Iron Moulders' Society of South Africa =

Trade union in South Africa

The Iron Moulders' Society of South Africa (IMS) was a trade union representing metalworkers in South Africa.

The union was founded in 1896. It was strongly focused on the rights of white workers, and sought to exclude others from working as moulders. In 1913, one "coloured" moulder was admitted to the union, against the opposition of some members, on the grounds that he presented as being white. It also campaigned for higher wages, longer holidays, and against piece work.

By 1980, the union was affiliated to the Trade Union Council of South Africa, and had 2,378 members. The majority were white, but a substantial minority were now "coloured" or Asian. In 1995, it merged with the Amalgamated Engineering Union of South Africa, the Engineering, Industrial and Mining Workers' Union, and the South African Boilermakers' Society, to form the National Employees' Trade Union.
