= Public and Allied Workers Union of South Africa =

Trade union in South Africa

PAWUSA
- Public and Allied Workers Union of South Africa
- Location: South Africa
- Key people: President: Berline Roseberry
- Affiliations: COSATU
- Website: www.pawusa.org.za

The Public and Allied Workers Union of South Africa (PAWUSA) is a trade union for public sector workers in South Africa. It is affiliated with the Congress of South African Trade Unions (COSATU).
