= National Union of Distributive Workers =

Trade union in South Africa

The National Union of Distributive Workers (NUDW) was a trade union representing workers involved in retail and goods transport in South Africa.

== History ==
The union was founded in 1936 by supporters of the South African Communist Party, to represent white and "coloured" workers in the industry. In 1937, Max Gordon and Daniel Koza launched the African Commercial and Distributive Workers' Union to represent black workers in the industry, and from 1942 the two unions had a collaborative relationship. They held a major joint strike in 1943, which established recognition of the union with most major chains of shops.

The NUDW campaigned successfully for the option of part-time work in the industry, achieved in 1953, and later for the improvement of the conditions of employment of part-time workers, mostly white women. From the late 1960s, the union campaigned against discrimination against "coloured" and Indian workers, forming the National Union of Commercial, Catering and Allied Workers (NUCCAW) as a parallel union to represent them. It was also opposed to the reservation of certain categories of work for white people, and more black workers gradually entered the sector.

By 1970, the union had 12,593 members and was affiliated to the Trade Union Council of South Africa. In 1975, it helped form the Commercial Catering and Allied Workers' Union of South Africa, to represent black workers in the sector. Its membership began to fall, dropping to 5,328 in 1980. At this point, it was led by Dulcie Hartwell.

In November 1982, the union merged with NUCCAW, to form the National Union of Distributive and Allied Workers.

== General Secretaries ==
1956: Ray Altman
1980: Dulcie Hartwell
