= South African Association of Municipal Employees =

South African trade union

The South African Association of Municipal Employees (SAAME) was a trade union representing local government workers in South Africa.

The union originated in 1917 as a federation of local government unions. By 1919 it had ten affiliates in the Transvaal and others elsewhere. The majority of these decided to turn the federation into a new union, which became the SAAME. It was a founding affiliate of the all-white South African Federation of Trade Unions, and later of the larger South African Confederation of Labour (SACOL).

By 1980, the union had 41,492 members, but it wanted to admit non-white workers and so resigned from SACOL. It joined the Federation of South African Labour Unions, and by 1992 it had 50,000 members. In 1996, it merged with the Durban Municipal Employees Association, Johannesburg Municipal Employees Association, National Union of Employees of Local Authorities and South African Local Authorities and Allied Workers' Union, to form the Independent Municipal and Allied Trade Union.
