= Hotel and Restaurant Workers' Union (South Africa) =

Trade union in South Africa

The Hotel and Restaurant Workers' Union (HARWU) was a trade union representing hospitality workers in South Africa.

The union was founded in 1926, as the Witwatersrand Liquor and Catering Employees' Union (Wit Liquor). By 1974, it was affiliated to the Trade Union Council of South Africa, and had 2,520 members. Most of its members were white, and some were classed as "coloured", but it was not legally permitted to admit black workers. The union's general secretary, Morris Kagan, opposed apartheid, and assisted the Commercial Catering and Allied Workers' Union of South Africa (CCAWUSA) in developing and recruiting black workers. In 1981, the union affiliated to the International Union of Food, Agricultural, Hotel, Restaurant, Tobacco and Allied Workers' Associations (IUF).

By 1984, CCAWUSA was a substantial union, and it co-operated with Wit Liquor in a strike which achieved higher wages for workers in small hotels. However, CCAWUSA pressed on with action to try to obtain increases for workers in larger hotels; this was defeated and led to most hospitality workers leaving that union. Wit Liquor had already begun admitting black workers, but this vacuum led it to focus on this strategy. It changed its name to the "Hotel and Restaurant Workers Union", and in 1986 it affiliated to the Congress of South African Trade Unions (COSATU), an unusual move for a historically non-black union. It also began recruiting members across the country.

In 1986, the union moved its headquarters to COSATU House in Johannesburg, but this was bombed on the orders of the police, and the union thereafter occupied successive temporary spaces in the city. By the end of 1987, it had 14,000 members, and it hoped that continued growth and a planned merger with the Cape Liquor and Catering Trades Employees' Union would persuade COSATU to recognise it as an industrial union. However, COSATU argued that it should merge into CCAWUSA. The merger proved extremely difficult, as CCAWUSA was split on ideological lines, and at one point, some of the African National Congress-aligned faction entered the HARWU offices and attacked staff there.

In 1989, the Cape Liquor union merged into HARWU. The following year, it finally merged into CCAWUSA, which changed its name to the "South African Commercial and Catering Workers' Union".

== General Secretaries ==
Morris Kagan
1984: Dirk Hartford
1986: Sidwell Magam
1986: Edwin Masi
