= Amalgamated Society of Woodworkers of South Africa =

Trade union in South Africa

The Amalgamated Society of Woodworkers of South Africa (ASW) was a trade union representing carpenters, joiners and those in related trades in South Africa.

The union originated in 1881, when the British-based Amalgamated Society of Carpenters and Joiners (ASC&J) founded a branch in Cape Town. This was the first union to form in South Africa. The ASC&J became the Amalgamated Society of Woodworkers, and the South African section maintained its affiliation. In 1913, it was a founding affiliate of the Cape Federation of Labour Unions. Membership declined to only 500 by 1914, but under the leadership of Harry Green, it grew rapidly, and by 1921 had more than 3,000 members, about half in Transvaal.

In 1926, the union gained independence from its British parent, and by 1945 it had grown to 5,837 members. Almost all its members were white; it admitted coloured and Indian workers in the Western Cape, where they formed a majority of the membership. By this point, its leadership had become increasingly conservative.

By 1978, the union had 4,474 members, with around two-thirds being white. In 1980, the majority of the union's membership left, to join the rival Amalgamated Union of Building Trade Workers of South Africa. The union was left with just the 600 members in its former engineering section. It appears to have dissolved in the 1990s.
