= South African Typographical Union =

Trade union in South Africa

The South African Typographical Union (SATU) is a trade union representing workers in the printing and media industries in South Africa.

The union was founded on 5 January 1898 by six local unions, including the Durban Typographical Society. Many of its founding members were immigrants from the United Kingdom who had held membership of the London Society of Compositors (LSC), and the new union's constitution was based on that of the LSC. It published the South African Typographical Journal, which was one of the key cheerleaders for a Labour Party. For many years, its president was Harry Sampson.

The union admitted white and "coloured" workers on the same basis, although all non-whites faced prejudice. It did not admit black or Asian workers, and opposed their involvement in the printing industry. It joined the South African Trades and Labour Council, then became a leading figure in the 1951 split which formed the South African Federation of Trade Unions, before joining the Trade Union Council of South Africa.

In 1980, it finally began accepting black workers, and its membership increased to 26,818. It is currently affiliated to the Federation of Unions of South Africa.
