= Amalgamated Engineering Union of South Africa =

Trade union in South Africa

- Geamalgameerde Ingenieursunie van Suid-Afrika
- Abbreviation: AEU
- Predecessor: Amalgamated Society of Engineers (UK)
- Merged into: National Employees' Trade Union
- Founded: 1893
- Dissolved: 1995
- Location: South Africa
- Affiliations: Trade Union Council of South Africa

The Amalgamated Engineering Union of South Africa (AEU) was a trade union representing white manufacturing workers in South Africa.

The British Amalgamated Society of Engineers established its first branch in South Africa in 1886, and in 1893 its South Africa branches became a distinct section of the union. It remained affiliated to its British parent as it became part of the Amalgamated Engineering Union, but while the British union began accepting all workers, regardless of perceived skill level, the South African section remained a craft union of higher-paid workers.

In 1957, the union became independent. At the time, it was affiliated to the Trade Union Council of South Africa, but it objected when that federation began accepting unions of black workers, and left in 1965. In 1976, the union formed the South African Central Labour Organisation with the South African Footplate Staff Association, but it proved unsuccessful, and dissolved in 1982. By 1980, it had a membership of 34,065.

In 1982, the union was expelled from the International Metalworkers' Federation on the request of the Federation of South African Trade Unions, for complying with apartheid. By 1995, it was down to 20,000 members, on 1 August, it merged with the Engineering, Industrial and Mining Workers' Union, the Iron Moulders' Society of South Africa, and the South African Boilermakers' Society, to form the National Employees' Trade Union.

== Presidents ==
1949: Ray Budd
1974: J. E. Faure
1980s: A. T. Allen
