= Garment Workers' Union of South Africa =

Trade union in South Africa

The Garment Workers' Union of South Africa (GWU) was a trade union representing workers in the clothing industry in South Africa.

The union was founded in 1909, as the Witwatersrand Tailors' Association, and its initial membership was focused on white master tailors and middlemen. In 1925, it established a section to represent factory workers in the industry, and this proved enormously successful; by the end of 1926, it represented 90% of clothing factory workers in the Witwatersrand region. That year, it also began representing "coloured" and Indian workers.

In 1928, Solly Sachs was elected as the union's general secretary. He focused on recruiting women workers in the industry, and also worked closely with the African Clothing Workers' Union. In 1929, the union voted in a new constitution, which led in 1930 to it renaming itself as the "Garment Workers' Union". The 1931 general strike placed a significant strain on the union, and in 1934 this led the tailors' section to split away, forming the Tailoring Workers' Industrial Union.

The Government of South Africa banned Sachs from leading a trade union. Although he initially ignored the ban, he later felt compelled to emigrate to England. By 1953, 60% of the union's membership was classed as "coloured", although government legislation required separate branches for white workers. In 1956, the white workers left to form the Garment Trade Union of European Employees.

The union worked closely with the National Union of Clothing Workers, but legislation prevented the two from merging until 1985, when they formed the National Union of Garment Workers.

== General Secretaries ==
Dan Colraine
1928: Solly Sachs
1952: Johanna Cornelius
1974: B. Krynauw
1981: Athol Margolis
