= Trade Union Council of South Africa =

South African trade union federation

The Trade Union Council of South Africa (TUCSA) was a national trade union federation in South Africa.

== History ==
The council was founded in October 1954 by 61 unions which split from the South African Trades and Labour Council. They decided that only registered unions would be permitted to affiliate. Because unions representing black workers were not permitted to register, this meant they were excluded from the council. A few retained links with TUCSA affiliates, and established the parallel Federation of Free African Trade Unions of South Africa. The federation was initially named the South African Trades Union Council. In 1957, it affiliated to the new South African Confederation of Labour, which aimed to bring together all registered unions in the country, but it withdrew the following year, finding many of the other unions were explicitly white nationalist. The experience led it to change its name to the "Trade Union Council of South Africa", to avoid any similarity of names with the confederation it had left.

In 1962, TUCSA changed its statutes to allow "black unions" to affiliate, but in 1965 the Amalgamated Engineering Union of South Africa (AEU) disaffiliated in protest at this. Two years later, the South African Typographical Union proposed splitting the council into two sections, one with registered unions only, and one with the more inclusive policy. Instead, the thirteen black unions decided to disaffiliate, in order to prevent a split. Many of the pro-government craft unions then followed the AEU in resigning, and faced with collapse, in 1969, TUCSA decided to once again restrict its membership to registered unions. This led some craft unions to reaffiliate.

With TUCSA's African affairs section closed, some of its officials formed the Urban Training Project, to encourage black workers to form new unions. From 1973, TUCSA recommended that its affiliates form parallel unions to represent black workers, but their weak position led independent black unions to argue that the parallel unions were simply puppets controlled by the registered unions, the registered unions hoping to preserve wage differentials and reduce militancy and political activism among black workers.

In 1974, TUCSA once again began admitting black unions, and some unions which had emerged from the Urban Training Project did join. From 1979, unions were legally permitted to represent all workers, and several TUCSA affiliates began to do so. In 1982, the council refused to join a general strike following the murder of Neil Aggett, and this led many unions to disaffiliate. In December 1986, with 32 affiliates remaining but only 170,000 members, the council decided to dissolve.

== Affiliates ==
In 1982, the following unions were affiliated:

Union	Abbreviation	Founded	Membership (1962)	Membership (1980)
African Leather Workers' Union	ALWU	1946	N/A	2,000
African Tobacco Workers' Union	ATUWU	1954	N/A	1,138
African Transport Workers' Union	ATWU	1973	N/A	2,273
African Trunk and Box Workers' Union		1950s	N/A	25
Amalgamated Engineering Union	AEU	1893	17,608	N/A
Amalgamated Society of Woodworkers	ASW	1881	4,680	N/A
Artisan Staff Association	ASA	1924	N/A	22,500
Association of Cape Furniture Workers			160	N/A
Association of Cinema Projectionists			455	32
Bay Bus Workers' Union			N/A	
Brewery Employees' Union		1929	229	N/A
Cape Furniture Workers' Union			1,490	N/A
Chemical and Allied Workers' Union		1937	N/A	522
Chemical Workers' Union		1943	N/A	710
Cinematograph Projectionists' Union (Coloured)			N/A	68
Concession Stores and Allied Trades' Assistants' Union	CS&ATAU	1926	510	257
Durban Integrated Municipal Employees' Society	DIMES	1936	N/A	3,986
Durban Rubber Industrial Union	DRIU		280	194
East London Divisional Council Employees' Union			60	N/A
East London Liquor and Catering Trades' Employees' Union	ELL&CTEU		N/A	60
East London Meat Trade Union			96	N/A
East London Municipal Transport Workers' Union of South Africa	ELMTWU		77	54
Engineering Industrial Workers' Union of South Africa	EIWUSA	1961	N/A	11,849
Funeral Undertakers' Union			61	N/A
Furniture Workers' Industrial Union	FWIU	1925	875	N/A
Garment Workers' Industrial Union	GWIU	1934	9,000	28,004
Garment Workers' Union of South Africa	GWUSA	1909	11,315	5,993
Garment Workers' Union of the Western Province	GWU-WP	1927	16,000	46,000
Glassworkers' Union	GWU	1943	260	436
Grave Diggers' and Cemetery Employees' Union			98	N/A
Hotel, Bar and Catering Trades' Employees' Association	HB&CTEA		1,000	2,500
Iron Moulders' Society of South Africa	IMS	1896	2,400	2,378
Johannesburg Municipal Combined Employees' Association			N/A	508
Johannesburg Municipal Transport Workers' Union	JMTWU	1935	1,500	890
Johannesburg Municipal Workers' Union			400	200
Kaffraria Divisional Council Employees' Association			N/A	51
Mine Surface Officials' Association of South Africa	MSOA	1919	N/A	13,868
Motor Industry Combined Workers' Union	MICWA	1961	N/A	13,135
Motor Industry Employees' Union	MIEU	1939	14,340	N/A
Motor Transport Workers' Union			N/A	405
Natal Baking Industry Employees' Union	NBaIEU	1965	N/A	550
Natal Liquor and Catering Trades' Employees' Union	NL&CTEU	1928	4,328	3,357
Natal Passenger Transport Employees' Union	NPTEU		N/A	400
National Union of Bank Employees			N/A	2,631
National Union of Cigarette and Tobacco Workers	NUC&TW	1928	1,038	668
National Union of Clothing Workers	NUCW	1962	N/A	21,418
National Union of Commercial, Catering and Allied Workers	NUCCAW	1966	N/A	5,571
National Union of Distributive Workers	NUDW	1936	11,936	5,328
National Union of Furniture and Allied Workers	NUFAW	1925	N/A	21,665
National Union of Laundry, Cleaning and Dyeing Workers	LC&DWUSA	1940	N/A	993
National Union of Leather Workers	NULW	1924	12,340	20,810
National Union of Operative Biscuit Makers and Packers	NUOBMiP	1937	1,157	642
Operative Bakers', Confectioners' and Van Conductors' Union			469	N/A
Operative Plasterers' Trade Union			200	N/A
Photographic Employees' Union			75	N/A
Radio, Television, Electronic and Allied Workers' Union	RTEAWU	1969	N/A	1,125
South African Bank Employees' Union		1973	N/A	765
South African Boilermakers', Iron and Steel Makers', Shipbuilders' and Welders' Society	SABS	1916	6,000	18,400
South African Canvas and Ropeworkers' Union	SAC&RWU	1926	338	150
South African Canvas and Ropeworkers' Union of the Cape			N/A	405
South African Electrical Workers' Association	SAEWA	1939	8,000	N/A
South African Hairdressers' Employees' Industrial Union	SAHEIU	1944	2,879	4,056
South African Society of Bank Officials	SASBO	1916	11,482	21,044
South African Theatre and Cinema Employees' Union	SAT&CEU		1,622	991
South African Theatre Union			N/A	550
South African Typographical Union	SATU	1896	15,376	26,818
South African Woodworkers' Union			N/A	1,429
Sweet Workers' Industrial Union			160	N/A
Sweet Workers' Union	SWU	1925	778	1,396
Tailoring Workers' Industrial Union		1934	545	N/A
Textile Workers' Industrial Union	TWIU	1935	N/A	6,227
Textile Workers' Union	TWU	1973	N/A	850
Tramway and Omnibus Workers' Union	TOWU		1,967	2,216
Tramway Officials' Staff Association			92	N/A
Transport Workers' Union			N/A	222
Transvaal Broom and Brush Workers' Industrial Union			54	N/A
Transvaal Leather and Allied Trades Industrial Union	TL&ATIU	1928	3,000	1,638
Transvaal Musicians' Union			N/A	314
Trawler and Line Fishermen's Union		1942	640	1,140
Trunk and Box Workers' Industrial Union	TBWU	1937	100	100
Witwatersrand Baking Employees' Association		1934	300	N/A
Witwatersrand Liquor and Catering Trade Employees' Union	Wit Liquor	1926	N/A	2,590
Witwatersrand Tearoom, Restaurant and Catering Trade Employees' Union		1930	1,000	900

== General Secretaries ==
1954: Dulcie Hartwell
1962: Terence O'Donoghue
1963: Arthur Grobbelaar
1985: Position vacant
