= Ebrahim Patel =

South African politician

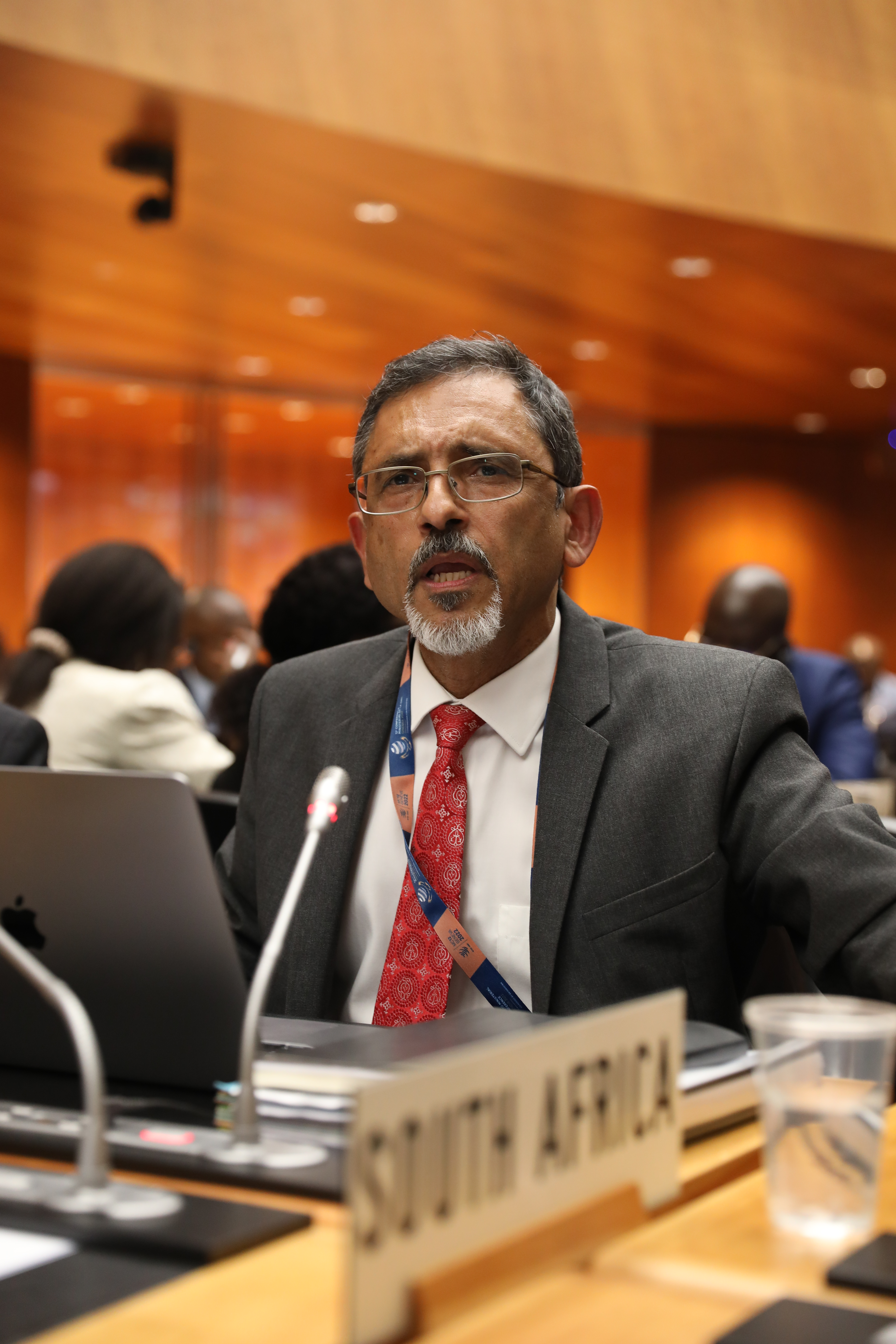
- Patel at the World Trade Organization in 2022

Minister of Trade, Industry and Competition
- In office 29 May 2019 – 3 July 2024
- President: Cyril Ramaphosa
- Deputy: Fikile Majola; Nomalungelo Gina
- Preceded by: Rob Davies
- Succeeded by: Parks Tau

Member of the National Assembly
- In office 6 March 2023 – 3 July 2024
- In office 21 May 2014 – 7 May 2019
Prior offices
Minister of Economic Development
In office 11 May 2009 – 29 May 2019
President	Jacob Zuma; Cyril Ramaphosa
Preceded by	Ministry established
Succeeded by	Ministry abolished
Secretary-General of the Southern African Clothing and Textile Workers' Union
In office 1993–2009
Preceded by	Johnny Copelyn
Succeeded by	André Kriel

Personal details
- Born: 10 January 1962 (age 64) District Six, Cape Town, South Africa
- Party: African National Congress
- Other political affiliations: Congress of South African Trade Unions
- Children: 4
- Education: University of Cape Town

Ebrahim Patel (born 10 January 1962) is a South African politician and former trade unionist who represents the African National Congress. He served as the Minister of Trade, Industry and Competition from 2019 to 2024 and as Minister of Economic Development from 2009 to 2019.

Raised in Cape Town, Patel rose to prominence in the trade union movement, notably as secretary-general of the Southern African Clothing and Textile Workers' Union from 1993 to 2009. In that capacity, he was labour convenor at the National Economic Development and Labour Council during the post-apartheid transition, as well as a member of the executive of the Congress of South African Trade Unions.

President Jacob Zuma appointed Patel to the cabinet after the April 2009 general election, and he was moved to the trade, industry and competition portfolio when President Cyril Ramaphosa created it in a ministerial merger in May 2019. Throughout his time in the cabinet, he was associated with the pursuit of localisation and industrialisation by means of industrial and sectoral planning. Both of his ministries rigorously applied public-interest provisions in South African competition law, frequently imposing developmental and social-responsibility conditions on private mergers, such as the 2011 acquisition of Massmart by Walmart. Though Patel is a self-proclaimed supporter of the entrepreneurial state and of public–private partnership, his critics objected to his interventionist impulses, which, along with his union background, gave him a reputation as a left-wing figure in the government.

== Early life and activism ==
Patel was born on 10 January 1962 in District Six in Cape Town. He grew up in Lansdowne and Grassy Park and was raised by a single mother, who was a garment worker. He became involved in political activism while at high school during the height of apartheid in the 1970s.

In 1980, he enrolled at the University of the Western Cape, where he continued his political organising – he was arrested and detained without charge on three separate occasions between 1980 and 1982. In 1982, he left the University of the Western Cape to take up a full-time position at the Southern Africa Labour and Development Research Unit, an economics research institute at the University of Cape Town (UCT). He continued studying for his bachelor's degree part-time and graduated later from UCT.

Patel joined the anti-apartheid United Democratic Front in 1983, representing the Lotus River–Grassy Park area, and he was active in related civic organisations, including the Cape Areas Housing Action Committee. However, his foremost political engagement was through the burgeoning trade union movement. Having been involved in supporting strikes during his earlier years as a student, he helped unionise university employees in the Cape Province while he was at UCT; in 1985, he was elected as the inaugural general secretary of the university union that was established as part of the initiative. Also in 1985, he took part in the meetings that led to the formation of the Congress of South African Trade Unions (Cosatu), which went on to play a central role in opposition to apartheid.

== Clothing and textile unions: 1986–2009 ==
In 1986, Patel became a full-time organiser for the National Union of Textile Workers, a large Cosatu affiliate which ultimately became the Southern African Clothing and Textile Workers' Union (SACTWU). He deputised Johnny Copelyn as SACTWU's assistant secretary-general until 1993, when he was elected to succeed Copelyn as secretary-general.

According to Nicoli Nattrass and Jeremy Seekings, "His strategy for the clothing sector became the model for labour market and industrial policy generally." Particularly influential was SACTWU's decision, under Patel, to pursue the development of a lucrative investment wing. Through chief executive Johnny Copelyn, SACTWU obtained a large stake in Hosken Consolidated Investments (HCI), which became a multi-billion-rand company; unlike Copelyn, Patel did not personally obtain shares in HCI.

More broadly, Patel "exerted considerable influence" while at SACTWU, both as a member of Cosatu's central executive committee and through various corporatist forums and public bodies. After Nelson Mandela was released from prison in 1990, Patel was a member of the trade union delegation that welcomed him at his home in Soweto, and in subsequent years, as South Africa's democratic transition progressed, he remained involved in social and policy debate. He was centrally involved in the establishment of the National Economic Forum – for dialogue between business, labour, and government – and he later became the overall convenor for labour on the forum's successor body, the National Economic Development and Labour Council (NEDLAC). In this capacity, Patel helped draft several key agreements and laws; in particular, he has been described as a "key architect" of the Labour Relations Act of 1995. He was also appointed by President Mandela to the inaugural Financial and Fiscal Commission, and he was the chief negotiator for the Framework Agreement on HIV/AIDS in 2002 to 2003 and for the National Textile Bargaining Council in 2003.

In the international arena, Patel was a longstanding member of the Workers' Group of the governing body of the International Labour Organisation (ILO), and he served as the group's global spokesperson on employment and social policy. He was also involved in negotiating and drafting several ILO policy documents. According to Nattrass and Seekings, he "helped to bring the ILO’s ideology of 'decent work', with modifications, to South Africa."

== Minister of Economic Development: 2009–2019 ==
In the immediate aftermath of the 2009 general election, the Mail & Guardian reported that Cosatu had asked newly elected President Jacob Zuma to appoint Patel as a cabinet minister, in order to increase the union's representation in government. When Zuma announced his cabinet the following week, on 10 May, Patel was appointed to a newly created portfolio as Minister of Economic Development. In order to take up the ministerial position, he vacated his SACTWU office and was succeeded by his former deputy, André Kriel.

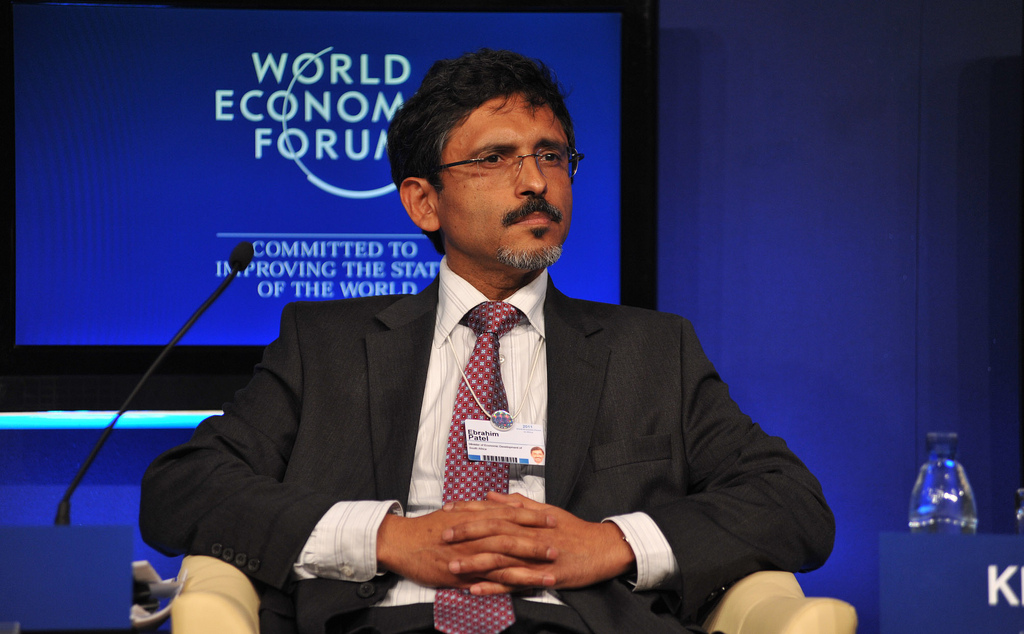
Patel at the World Economic Forum in May 2011

Patel was Minister of Economic Development throughout Zuma's two terms as president, and he was retained in the cabinet of President Cyril Ramaphosa, who replaced Zuma in February 2018. In addition, in the 2014 general election, he joined the National Assembly as a representative of the African National Congress (ANC).

=== Government politics ===
==== Ministerial mandate ====
Patel's ministerial tenure began with a series of media reports pointing to tension in the cabinet, the result of the unclear mandate and jurisdiction of Patel's newly created ministry. In particular, he reportedly clashed with Trevor Manuel, Zuma's Minister in the Presidency with responsibility for national planning. Leftists in the Tripartite Alliance apparently wanted Patel, rather than Manuel, to be appointed at the head of the National Planning Commission. In addition, tensions apparently arose because Patel publicly asserted authority over "micro- and macroeconomic development planning", a function that the Public Finance Management Act delegated to Finance Minister Pravin Gordhan.

According to the Mail & Guardian, the tensions were partly reflective of "the larger battle over South Africa’s economic policy direction". Because of his union associations, Patel was viewed as a representative of the left in the cabinet; indeed, he was sometimes wrongly identified as a senior member of the South African Communist Party, though in fact he had never been a member. In this perspective, Patel's leftist affiliation set him apart from – and in competition with – moderate figures such as Manuel, Gordhan, and their respective supporters.

Officials inside the government said that Patel would be responsible for "broad-brush economic development planning", providing long-term strategic input into the national economic policy developed and implemented by the National Treasury. However, at the end of Zuma's first term in 2014, the Mail & Guardian observed that Patel still had "one marked flaw: nobody knows what he does."

==== Canyon Springs inquiry ====
In December 2011, Patel's deputy, former trade unionist Enoch Godongwana, resigned from the ministry amid the scandal surrounding an inquiry into the liquidation of Canyon Springs, a private investment company that was half-owned by Godongwana's family trust and of which Godongwana was a former director. SACTWU had pursued the inquiry on the basis that several hundred-million rands in SACTWU pension funds had been invested in Canyon Springs and subsequently lost, amid alleged embezzlement and fraud. Because he had been general-secretary of the union at the time the investment was made, Patel was initially summoned to testify at the inquiry, though he was later excused.

Patel said that he had no knowledge of or authority over SACWTU's provident investments (which were managed by trustees, rather than union officials), and Godongwana denied that his resignation was related to the scandal, but the Mail & Guardian nonetheless said that the saga had damaged the reputation of Patel's department.

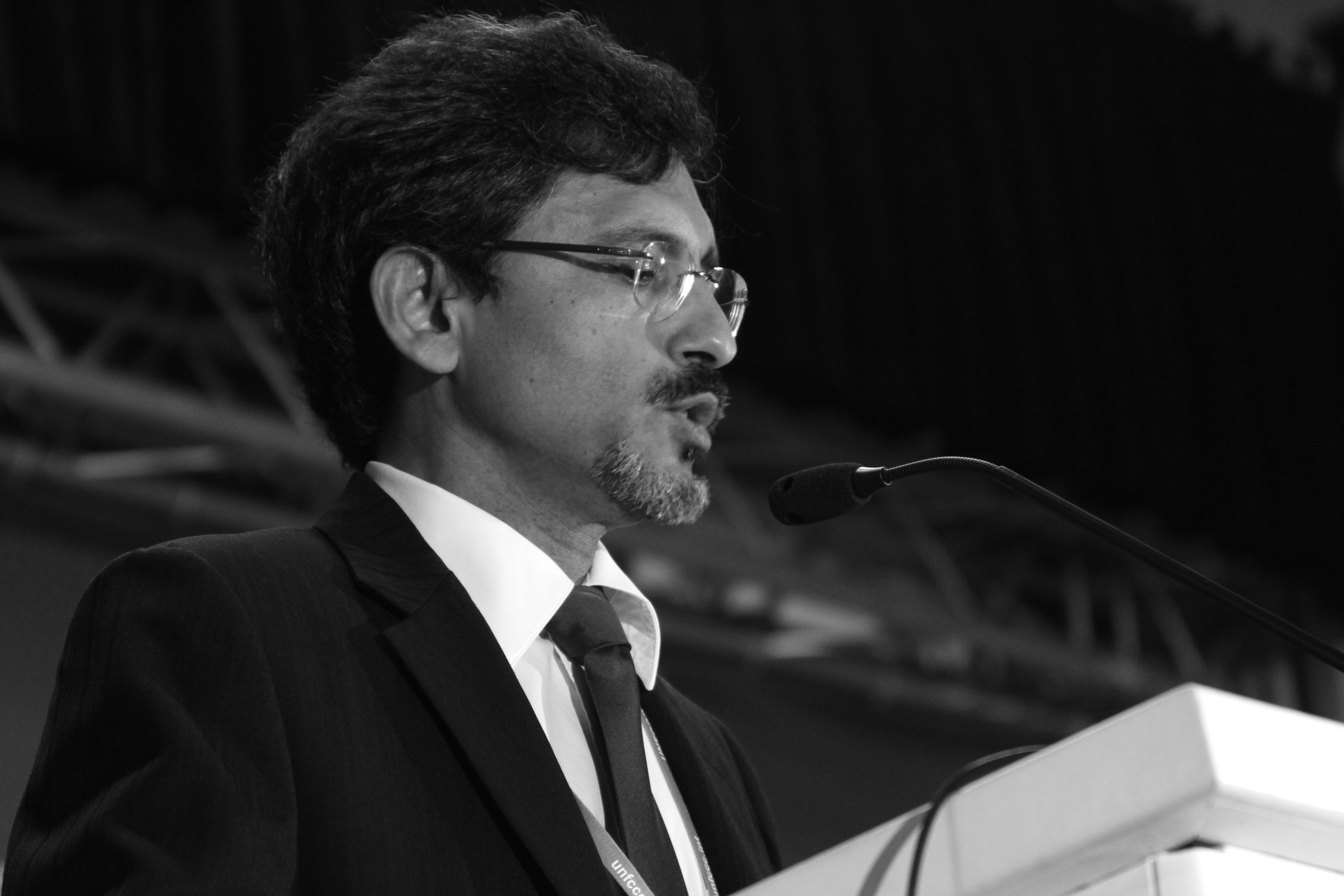
Patel in December 2011

==== Response to state capture ====
Patel's term as Minister of Economic Development coincided with alleged state capture of the Zuma administration by sectional interests, and in particular by Zuma's allies in the Gupta family. In the Financial Mail's phrase, Patel "toed the party line in supporting Zuma" during his presidency. Indeed, Zuma reportedly held Patel in high regard. However, Patel spoke out against the "high levels of corruption in our ranks" as early as May 2016. In addition, in a move viewed by some observers as daring, in September 2017 – while Zuma was still president – he released a report which estimated that corruption cost the South African economy as much as R27 billion annually.

Patel's ministry was also among the first to take action to review Gupta-associated projects. In November 2017, Patel told Parliament that his ministry intended to sue Oakbay Resources and Energy, a Gupta-linked firm, to recover an amount of R293 million loaned to Oakbay by the Industrial Development Corporation (IDC) in earlier years. In addition, in response to the controversy around the Oakbay loan, Patel instructed the IDC to publish a list of all politically exposed recipients of developmental finance, aiming to increase transparency.

=== New Growth Path ===
In November 2010, in the wake of a global economic crisis, Patel published the New Growth Path, a policy framework which set out an expanded role for the state in job creation. The framework set a highly ambitious target: the creation of five million jobs over the next decade, to be achieved through a mixture of macroeconomic and microeconomic "job drivers". Among other things, the plan proposed a broad wage accord between business and labour, inflation-linked salary caps, looser monetary policy, and investments by pension funds in developmental projects. Some commentators observed a disconnect between Patel's plan and the policy and budget of the National Treasury; for example, the New Growth Path omitted mention of the R6 billion in youth employment subsidies proposed by the Treasury. Major South African trade association Business Unity South Africa disagreed with the job-creation target, criticised the government for "too much talk and little action" in various competing economic policy initiatives, and published a host of counter-proposals.

In line with the New Growth Path, Patel led discussions between government and social partners that led to five different "social accords", including agreements on skills development and the development of a green economy. The Mail & Guardian later described the accords as "so forgettable that only a handful of South Africans can remember their details". He also told the National Council of Provinces that all government departments regarded 2011 as "a year of job creation". However, at the end of 10 years, the job-creation target was not achieved: the economy added 2.7 million jobs by 2020, though a further 2.4 million unemployed people entered the workforce over the same period. In an interview with the Financial Mail in June 2020, Patel said that state capture was partly responsible for the missed target, explaining:

Well, there was more than one reason we didn't achieve it. One of the biggest constraints was that the state was unable to do the things that a dynamic, efficient state would do since so many resources were sucked out of it. It wasn't just the money – though that was enormous. It was also the loss of vision, because state capture did what any corruption does, it distorts decision-making.

=== Investment and industry ===
Patel represented South Africa at BRICS summits and at the World Economic Forum in Davos, and he chaired the preparatory committee for South Africa's inaugural Presidential Investment Conference in October 2018. Domestically, he encouraged the Industrial Development Corporation (IDC) – one of the agencies under his oversight – to increase its support for industrialisation, particularly in the manufacturing sector, and to "increase its risk appetite". He also oversaw the establishment of the IDC's Small Enterprise Finance Agency in 2012.

Aiming to promote local industrialisation, Patel issued a controversial trade-policy directive that enforced a mandatory price-preference across foundries and steel mills on scrap metal collected inside South Africa. Metal exporters challenged the policy unsuccessfully in the High Court and Supreme Court of Appeal, and the Constitutional Court denied them leave to appeal in 2017, allowing the policy to be upheld.

==== Competition ====
In 2017, Patel's ministry published the draft Competition Amendment Bill, which passed in 2018 and effected a range of changes to competition law in South Africa. Patel said that the overwhelming objective of the legislation was to promote economic inclusion by mitigating market concentration and rectifying racial inequalities of ownership. Among other things, it expanded the powers and mandate of the Competition Commission.

By the time the bill was introduced, Patel already had a reputation for his strong interpretation of the Competition Act, and particularly of the so-called public interest clause, which licensed the consideration of "public policy objectives" in assessing prospective mergers. The clause was rarely applied until 2011, when Patel used it to intervene in Walmart's multi-billion-rand bid to acquire Massmart. Though the Competition Commission approved a R16.5-billion deal, Patel's ministry challenged the decision in the Competition Appeal Court, arguing that the merger could lead to increased imports and therefore to job losses inside South Africa. Sources told the Mail & Guardian that Patel's activism was likely motivated by his desire to show loyalty to the trade union movement, even at the risk of appearing hostile to foreign direct investment; the South African Commercial, Catering and Allied Workers' Union had threatened to go on strike to protest the acquisition. When the Massmart deal was concluded, it included protections for South African jobs and other social responsibility commitments, such as contributions to a local business-development fund.

According to the Financial Mail, the Massmart deal set a precedent for public-interest negotiations ahead of major mergers and acquisitions. Public-interest conditions were subsequently applied to deals by Coca-Cola, AB InBev, Sinopec, and Old Mutual, among others. Patel later denied that he used competition policy to justify state intervention in the economy, saying:

In the case of [South Africa], given our twin challenges to increase the rate of growth and to make that growth more inclusive, it's unavoidable that competition will grapple with more than just the traditional concerns around transactions.

==== Infrastructure ====
As minister, Patel headed the secretariat of the Presidential Infrastructure Coordinating Commission (PICC), which oversaw Zuma's R1-trillion national infrastructure plan. To facilitate the commission's work, Patel's department introduced the Infrastructure Development Act, which passed in 2014. However, the commission was criticised for lacklustre oversight of the "skyrocketing costs and delays" associated with the construction of three new power stations, Medupi, Kusile and Ingula. Moreover, investment in public infrastructure declined during Zuma's second term, which Patel attributed partly to state-owned entities, where there had been, in his summation, "weakened governance, impaired balance sheets and shift in focus... ascribed to state capture and corruption". In 2018, President Ramaphosa announced his own fiscal stimulus package, underpinned by major infrastructure investment and overseen by the PICC.

== Minister of Trade, Industry and Competition: 2019–2024 ==
When President Ramaphosa announced his second cabinet on 29 May 2019, Patel was appointed as Minister of Trade, Industry and Competition, with Fikile Majola and Nomalungelo Gina as his deputies. His new ministry amalgamated the Ministry of Trade and Industry, formerly under Rob Davies, with Patel's former Economic Development portfolio. Patel was initially appointed to the cabinet from outside Parliament, because, ranked 137th on the party list, he lost his parliamentary seat in the May 2019 general election. However, toward the end of the legislative term, on 6 March 2023, he was sworn in to the National Assembly, filling a casual vacancy.

=== Industrial and trade policy ===
At the outset of Ramaphosa's new administration in 2019, he and Patel emphasised their focus on driving economic growth through a new industrial strategy, which Patel said would rely on private–public partnership and stimulating private investment. Patel has said that he supports state intervention in the economy when it creates a better "social outcome", and that in general he favours Mariana Mazzucato's notion of an entrepreneurial state.

A cornerstone of the ministry's policy has been so-called sectoral "master plans", detailing complex industrial and trade strategies for seven key South African industries, with a focus on promoting industrialisation and, by improving local competitiveness, localisation. Industries covered by master plans include poultry (signed in November 2019); textiles and clothing (November 2019); sugar (November 2020); and steel and metal fabrication (June 2021). Insofar as they include localisation measures, the plans have been criticised as protectionist. The process for developing the master plans has been criticised as opaque and biased towards the interests of large companies. In addition, in a lengthy analysis published in January 2023, the Mail & Guardian concluded that Patel's ministry had struggled to ensure organisational stability in its 17 agencies after the 2019 ministerial merger, detracting from Patel's attention to industrial policy.

Patel is known as a supporter of worker representation in shareholding and management. In May 2021, he announced a plan to amend the Companies Act to require companies to disclose executive salaries and pay differentials. In this vein, he has continued his earlier practice of vigorously applying the Competition Act's public interest provisions, frequently intervening in mergers and acquisitions. For example, he intervened in PepsiCo's acquisition of Pioneer Foods to ensure that PepsiCo agreed to certain public interest conditions for the deal, including shareholding for a locally held workers' trust and various other local empowerment initiatives.

In the realm of international trade, Patel has been an outspoken supporter of South African participation in the American African Growth and Opportunity Act (AGOA) programme, saying in May 2023 that, amid deteriorating relations with the United States, South Africa "should do everything possible" to retain its AGOA benefits.

=== Covid-19 pandemic ===
During the COVID-19 pandemic, some of the lockdown regulations published by Patel's ministry were derided as illogical and absurdly statist. They included rules prohibiting e-commerce, prohibiting the sale of cooked food at grocery stores, and restricting clothing retailers to sales of a state-approved list of products. Patel became, in the summation of the Financial Mail, the "bogeyman of the anti-lockdown brigade... held up as the poster-child of the 'irrational' Covid-19 rules". However, at the end of 2020, News24 complimented the work of the Competition Commission, one of the agencies overseen by Patel, for its activist response to price gouging in sales of COVID-19 personal protective equipment; among other things, the commission fined Dis-Chem R1.2 million for overpricing surgical masks.

During the pandemic, Patel contracted COVID-19 twice, testing positive on 25 July 2020 and (two weeks after President Ramaphosa's own diagnosis) on 28 December 2021.

== Books ==
He has edited three books: Engine of Development?: South Africa's National Economic Forum (1993) on the National Economic Forum; Worker Rights: From Apartheid To Democracy – What Role for Organised Labour (1994) on workers' rights in post-apartheid South Africa; and, with Justin Yifu Lin and Joseph Stiglitz, The Industrial Policy Revolution II: Africa in the Twenty-first Century (2013) on industrialisation in Africa.

== Personal life ==
Patel is married and has four children. He is Muslim.
