= Christine Ramon =

South African businesswoman

- Born: 1968 or 1969 (age 57–58); Port Elizabeth, Eastern Cape; South Africa
- Education: University of South Africa
- Occupation: Businesswoman
- Years active: 1995–present

Kandimathie Christine Ramon (born 1968 or 1969) is a South African businesswoman and chartered accountant. Before taking early retirement in 2022, she was the Chief Financial Officer at AngloGold Ashanti, where she was also interim chief executive officer between 2020 and 2021. Before that, she was the chief financial officer at Sasol and the chief executive officer at Cyril Ramaphosa's Johnnic Holdings.

== Early life and career ==
Ramon was born in 1968 or 1969 in Port Elizabeth in the Eastern Cape. She was one of five siblings, including a twin sister. After finishing high school, she worked part-time for the Mthatha office of Coopers & Lybrand while studying accounting through the University of South Africa. In 1988, she graduated with her bachelor's degree, and at age 23, she – like three of her four siblings – qualified as a chartered accountant.

She remained at Coopers & Lybrand until 1994, working as an auditor at the firm's offices in South Africa and in Verona, Italy. In 1994, ahead of South Africa's first post-apartheid elections, she was seconded to the Independent Electoral Commission as a deputy finance director. Later that year, she began a brief stint as a finance controller at Pepsi.

== Johnnic Holdings: 1995–2006 ==
Ramon joined Johnnic Holdings in 1995 as chief accountant before being promoted to senior general manager for finance. While she was serving in the latter position, in December 2000, the Mail & Guardian named her as one of the "top 100 stars of the future" in South Africa. Johnnic chairman Cyril Ramaphosa appointed her as financial director in 2003, and in October 2004 she became acting chief executive officer after the incumbent, Jacob Modise, resigned. She was permanently appointed as chief executive officer in March 2005, aged 36.

Over the next year, Johnnic was subject to a hostile takeover by Hosken Consolidated Investments (HCI), which was competing with Johnnic for control of Tsogo Investment Holdings and its lucrative Tsogo Sun assets. By December 2005, HCI had sufficient influence to install four of its directors on Johnnic's board and to block Johnnic's long-planned acquisition of Nafhold. Ramon announced her retirement later the same week; she later said of HCI that "I felt their strategy was not aligned to mine". Ramaphosa followed her exit and the pair were ultimately replaced by HCI's chief executive and chairman, Johnny Copelyn and Marcel Golding.

== Sasol: 2006–2013 ==
In April 2006, Ramon announced that she would join Sasol as director and chief financial officer with effect from 1 May. She held the position for seven-and-a-half years, under chief executives Pat Davies and David Constable, and oversaw the company's major Inzalo black economic empowerment deal in 2008. She resigned unexpectedly in late August 2013, shortly after selling R33.7 million in Sasol shares. After leaving Sasol in September 2013, she took several months' hiatus from executive work, though in 2014 she began a five-year term as a non-executive director at MTN.

== AngloGold Ashanti: 2014–2022 ==
In July 2014, gold-mining giant AngloGold Ashanti announced Ramon's appointment as chief financial officer, under chief executive Srinivasan Venkatakrishnan. She took office on 1 October 2014. Between September 2020 and September 2021, she served as the company's interim chief executive officer until Alberto Calderon was appointed to take up the position permanently. During that period, AngloGold's chairperson, Sipho Pityana, departed suddenly from the board and was replaced by Maria Ramos.

In February 2022, Ramon announced that she would leave AngloGold Ashanti in order to take early retirement, with effect from June 2022.

== Personal life and retirement ==
Ramon's husband died of COVID-19-related illness in 2021, and she took early retirement in order to spend more time with their two children. Since leaving AngloGold, she has accepted non-executive directorships at the Vodafone Group and Clicks Group, among others.

== Honours ==
The World Economic Forum selected Ramon as a Young Global Leader in 2007. Between 2014 and 2018, during her time at AngloGold, she won several South African CFO Awards, including CFO of the Year in 2018.
