= The Big Con =

The Big Con may refer to:

- The Big Con (video game), a 2021 video game developed by Mighty Yell and published by Skybound Games
- The Big Con: How the Consulting Industry Weakens our Businesses, Infantilizes our Governments and Warps our Economies, a 2023 book by Mariana Mazzucato and Rosie Collington
- The Big Con: The Story of the Confidence Man and the Confidence Game, a 1940 book by David W. Maurer
- The Big Con: The True Story of How Washington Got Hoodwinked and Hijacked by Crackpot Economics, a 2007 book by Jonathan Chait
