= Marcel Golding =

South African businessman and former trade unionist (born 1960)

Member of the National Assembly
- In office 1994–1997

Assistant General Secretary of the National Union of Mineworkers
- In office 1985–1993
- General Secretary: Cyril Ramaphosa; Kgalema Motlanthe
- Succeeded by: Gwede Mantashe

Personal details
- Born: 29 June 1960 (age 66) Johannesburg, Transvaal; Union of South Africa
- Party: African National Congress
- Other political affiliations: Congress of South African Trade Unions
- Spouse: Bronwyn Keene-Young
- Education: University of Cape Town

Marcel Golding (born 29 June 1960) is a South African businessman and former trade unionist. He is best known for his tenure as executive chairman of private-equity firm Hosken Consolidated Investments (HCI) from 1997 to 2014. During that time, he was also chief executive officer of e.TV from 1999 to 2014. He is currently chief executive at African & Overseas Enterprises and maintains directorships in the gambling, retail, and other sectors.

Golding rose to prominence in the 1980s as the assistant general secretary of the National Union of Mineworkers (NUM), an affiliate of the Congress of South African Trade Unions. He represented the African National Congress in the National Assembly during the first post-apartheid Parliament from 1994; he resigned his seat in 1997 in order to take over the running of HCI. HCI was initially conceived as a vehicle for NUM investments, but Golding himself acquired a billion-rand stake. He left HCI and e.TV in October 2014 after falling out with fellow former unionist Johnny Copelyn, who was his longtime friend and business partner.

== Early life and career ==
Golding was born on 29 June 1960 in Johannesburg in the former Transvaal. He grew up in Crawford and played soccer at the provincial level, but his plan to become a professional player was scuppered in 1975 when he was hit by a car and broke his leg. He completed a bachelor's degree and honours degree at the University of Cape Town, where he worked as a lecturer from 1980 until 1983, when he was appointed as a research writer at the South African Labour Bulletin.

== Union and political career ==
He was subsequently recruited into the National Union of Mineworkers (NUM) as a press and publicity officer. From 1985 to 1993, he served as assistant general secretary of the NUM, led until 1991 by Cyril Ramaphosa. He was elected to the position for three consecutive terms; on the second occasion, in 1987, he narrowly defeated future NUM leader Gwede Mantashe, receiving 572 votes against Mantashe's 552. The NUM was at that time the largest affiliate of the Congress of South African Trade Unions (COSATU), a close ally of the African National Congress (ANC), and in 1987, under Golding and Ramaphosa, it organised a historic nationwide mineworkers' strike.

In December 1991, Ramaphosa was elected as secretary general of the African National Congress (ANC) – though Golding himself failed to gain election to a seat on the ANC's National Executive Committee. Golding, as Ramaphosa's deputy, became acting general secretary of the NUM and a frontrunner to succeed Ramaphosa permanently. His candidacy was controversial because he was viewed as a leading member of a faction which opposed the growing influence of the South African Communist Party (SACP) in the union. In January 1992, the NUM's central committee voted to elect the SACP's Kgalema Motlanthe as interim general secretary and Golding returned to his former post as assistant general secretary.

== Parliament: 1994–1996 ==
In 1993, Pallo Jordan recruited Golding to work on the ANC's campaign ahead of the 1994 general election, which would be South Africa's first post-apartheid election. During the campaign, Golding wrote speeches for presidential candidate Nelson Mandela and became one of 20 senior COSATU officials who stood for election on the ANC's party list. He was elected to ANC seat in the National Assembly, where he chaired the Portfolio Committee on Mining and Energy until 1997, when he resigned from his seat to run the NUM's investment wing.

== Hosken Consolidated Investments: 1997–2014 ==
Golding established the NUM's Mineworkers Investment Company (MCI), owned by an NUM trust, and struck up a close partnership with Johnny Copelyn, who had left Parliament at the same time as Golding to run the investment wing of the Southern African Clothing and Textile Workers' Union (SACTU), another large COSATU affiliate. In 1997, Golding and Copelyn each reversed a number of their companies' assets in exchange for a controlling stake in Hosken Consolidated Investments (HCI), a holding company headquartered in Cape Town and publicly listed on the Johannesburg Stock Exchange (JSE). Golding was installed as executive chairperson and Copelyn as chief executive officer.

=== Union investment model ===
HCI was the first ever union-controlled investment company listed on the JSE and was viewed as one of the best managed. The model of union investment pioneered by Golding and Copelyn through HCI was controversial among leftists, and, in some accounts, that model "changed the face of the country's labour movement", promoting the rise of "business unionism". In 2007, Golding, in an interview with Ben Turok, said that he viewed himself as a "social entrepreneur". He explained his and Copelyn's union investment model:

You have the union at the top, and the Chinese wall between the union and the business is an investment trust. At the bottom you have the business. The investment trust is not the business. The investment trust is the custodian of the value that is going to be created, which will then be distributed to working people... That’s how I saw my role – to create the wealth, put it into the trust and then the trust decides how it will benefit the community.

Golding pointed out that the unions and their constituencies additionally benefited not only from dividends to the trust but also through HCI's own multimillion-rand philanthropic foundation. Nonetheless, over the next decade, HCI's activities were frequently controversial among unionists, and COSATU made moves to attempt to restrain Golding and Copelyn on several occasions. After a fallout between MIC and Golding in 1999, Golding was asked to step down from MIC's board, and the NUM ultimately divested from HCI, though SACTU remained a major shareholder. Also controversial was the personal enrichment of Golding and Copelyn as a result of HCI's activities, primarily through black economic empowerment deals that HCI was eligible for because its shareholders were majority black. Both men made personal fortunes through share participation rights and directorship fees: in 2005, Golding owned 8.4 per cent of HCI and he held a variety of directorships. In 2006, he was listed 48th on the Sunday Times Rich List, with an estimated net worth of R360-million, and by 2014 he was listed 33rd due to his personal R1.25-billion stake in HCI. Copelyn argued that he and Golding had gotten rich by taking on risk in their personal capacities in defence of investments they believed in. In 2007, Golding responded to criticism by explaining:

You see, the problem we [Golding and Copelyn] grappled with was this: How in a society dominated by capitalism can you create both collective wealth and individual wealth? The debate is not 'I have been made wealthy by the process' but 'can I get wealthy in the right proportion to the collective?'

=== HCI investments ===
HCI operated as a private-equity holding company, with particular interests in casinos, hotels, and media, as well as other various interests including Cape Town's Golden Arrow buses and Clover dairy. In the media realm, in addition to buying a major share in Yfm, HCI founded Midi Consortium, which formed Midi Television and successfully petitioned the Independent Broadcasting Authority for a broadcasting license in 1998. The resulting television channel was e.TV, South Africa's first privately owned free-to-air channel, and Golding – formerly consortium deputy chairperson – became its chief executive officer from 1999 to 2014. During his tenure at e.TV, Golding faced labour-relations issues and disputes with mid-level management. However, despite the concern of institutional shareholders, by 2003 e.TV was a top performer in the industry, with a growing multi-racial audience and growing profits.

Golding and Copelyn also became well known for HCI's hostile takeover of Johnnic Holdings in 2005, which led the Mail & Guardian to label HCI as "South Africa's first black economic empowerment predator". By mid-2005, it was clear that HCI was aiming to consolidate its interests in Tsogo Investment Holdings, which controlled the lucrative casino and hotel assets of Tsogo Sun. Johnnic was also a shareholder in Tsogo and HCI's main rival for control. As HCI gradually bought out smaller companies' stakes in Johnnic, Golding denied that it was a hostile takeover attempt, saying, "How can it be hostile when you acquire shares on a willing-buyer, willing-seller basis?". Johnnic was at that time chaired by Golding's former boss in the NUM, Cyril Ramaphosa. HCI succeeded in its takeover and Golding succeeded Ramaphosa as Johnnic chairperson in 2006.

=== Resignation ===
On 22 October 2014, HCI announced that Golding had been suspended from his chairmanship pending a disciplinary hearing into gross misconduct charges. The board claimed that he had inappropriately purchased shares in Ellies, on behalf of an HCI subsidiary, without board authorisation. Golding, however, said that he had been suspended as punishment for refusing to yield to political pressure at e.TV: according to Golding, he had been encouraged to ensure favourable coverage of President Jacob Zuma in the run-up to the 2014 general election but had refused. He claimed that Copelyn and HCI executive director Yunus Shaik (brother of Moe and Schabir) were "the driving forces behind the attempts to push me out" because they believed that Golding's recalcitrance harmed HCI's and SACTWU's interests. The Mail & Guardian speculated that both explanations were "red herrings" and that Copelyn and Golding had fallen out over some other, undisclosed matter.

Golding attempted unsuccessfully to challenge his suspension in the Cape Labour Court. On 26 October, the day before his disciplinary hearing, Golding announced his retirement from HCI and its subsidiaries. In an internal statement released the following day, Golding wrote:

You are aware of the reports in the newspapers over the past few days and the fact that I was suspended and expected to face certain charges brought against me by HCI. I deny these charges. I am of the view that the manner in which HCI intended to conduct my hearing as well as the circumstances which led to the decision to bring charges against me has rendered my employment relationship with HCI intolerable. The relationship of confidence and trust between myself and the board of HCI has broken down due to the manner in which the HCI board has conducted itself. In the circumstances, I have been forced to resign and I will in due course be bringing a claim of unfair dismissal on the grounds that I have been constructively dismissed.

In the aftermath, Barbara Hogan, an independent non-executive director at HCI, also resigned, saying that she was uneasy about the board's handling of the dispute and its broader handling of its media interests generally. e.TV later acknowledged in a statement that "the boundaries of editorial control were not clear to everyone involved" in certain projects that covered government activities.

Golding said that he would leave all employment positions but retain his directorships. At the time of his resignation, he had superseded Copelyn as the largest individual shareholder in HCI with an eight per cent stake, which he retained after leaving the company's employment.

== Later business career ==
After leaving HCI, Golding retained several directorships – including at Tsogo Sun – and made additional investments in construction and finance. He was appointed as chief executive officer of African & Overseas Enterprises in September 2018 and as of 2022 served as chairman at Texton Property Fund.

== Personal life ==
Golding is married to Bronwyn Keene-Young, a businesswoman who served as e.TV's chief operating officer until October 2014, when she resigned shortly after her husband. They have two teenaged children.
