= EMedia Holdings =

South African media investment holding company

eMedia Holdings
- Formerly: Seardel Investment Corporation
- Type: Public
- Traded as: JSE: EMH; JSE: EMN
- ISIN: ZAE000208898; ZAE000209524
- Industry: Media
- Founded: 1968; 58 years ago
- Headquarters: Johannesburg, Gauteng, South Africa
- Area served: South Africa
- Key people: Johnny Copelyn (Chairperson); Khalik Sherrif (CEO)
- Products: Television channels Satellite television Streaming services Radio; Media content
- Brands: e.tv eNCA; Openview eVOD; Y
- Services: Broadcasting; Content production Satellite television Streaming; Radio
- Revenue: ▼ R2.99 billion (2026)
- Operating income: ▼ R405.1 million (2026)
- Net income: ▼ R299.5 million (2026)
- Total assets: ▲ R6.2 billion (2026)
- Total equity: ▲ R4.4 billion (2026)
- Owner: Hosken Consolidated Investments (54.06%)
- Number of employees: 864 (2026)
- Divisions: Broadcasting; Content; Digital platforms Properties and facilities
- Subsidiaries: eMedia Investments
- Website: emediaholdings.co.za

eMedia Holdings, sometimes referred to simply as eMedia, is a South African investment holding company with interests in the media sector.

Founded in 1968, eMedia is based in Johannesburg and is dual-listed on the JSE. The company is majority-owned by Cape Town investment holding company Hosken Consolidated Investments.

eMedia has investments in television and radio broadcasting, satellite television, streaming services, media production, and media-related property and facilities.

One of the company's flagship holdings is Cape Town-headquartered e.tv, SA's only privately-owned free-to-air TV channel, which broadcasts news and entertainment programming nationally.

== History ==
eMedia Holdings was incorporated in 1968 as Seardel Investment Corporation Limited. Seardel was originally a diversified industrial company, with interests including clothing and textiles.

In October 1998, the group's media interests were established when e.tv began broadcasting, as South Africa's first commercial free-to-air TV channel. e.tv was owned through Sabido Investments, a media holding company associated with HCI, and later Remgro. Sabido subsequently expanded beyond e.tv into other broadcasting and media activities.

In 2008, Sabido launched the eNews Channel, a 24-hour television news service that later became eNCA.

Also in 2008, Cape Town-based holding company Hosken Consolidated Investments (HCI) acquired control of Seardel, as part of its expansion into the clothing and textile sector.

In 2013, HCI began restructuring its media interests through Seardel. Seardel acquired additional interests in Sabido, increasing its effective stake to 63.9%, while HCI and Remgro continued to participate in the media group. The restructuring was intended to create a more clearly defined media investment platform and simplify the group's corporate structure.

In October 2013, the group's media business launched OpenView, a free-to-air satellite television platform operated through Platco Digital. The platform formed part of the group's strategy to expand beyond its flagship e.tv service.

In 2014, Seardel separated its non-media businesses from its media interests. The former non-media assets were transferred to Deneb Investments, which was separately listed on the JSE in December 2014. The restructuring left Seardel primarily as a media investment holding company.

In September 2015, Seardel increased its effective interest in Sabido to 67.7% by acquiring the remaining minority interests held by employees. The following month, shareholders approved the company's change of name from Seardel Investment Corporation Limited to eMedia Holdings Limited, reflecting its transformation into a media-focused investment holding company.

In 2016, eMedia Holdings' principal asset was its 67.7% interest in eMedia Investments, which itself held the group's broadcasting, content, distribution, property, and production interests. eMedia Investments' principal businesses included e.tv, eNCA, OpenView, and YFM, alongside a range of content and production businesses.

In June 2025, eMedia Holdings agreed to acquire the remaining 32.31% of eMedia Investments held by Venfin. The transaction was completed in September 2025, giving eMedia Holdings full ownership of its principle operating subsidiary.

== Operations ==
eMedia Holdings operates primarily through its wholly owned subsidiary eMedia Investments, which has interests in television and radio broadcasting, satellite television, streaming services, and media-related property and facilities. Its principal broadcasting businesses include e.tv, a free-to-air commercial television network, and eNCA, a 24-hour news channel. The group also operates the Openview free-to-air satellite television platform and the eVOD video-on-demand service.

Company	Activities	HQ	Established	Ref
eMedia Investments	Media investment holding company; owns the group's broadcasting, content, property, and facilities businesses	Johannesburg, Gauteng	1994; 32 years ago	
e.tv	Free-to-air commercial television broadcasting	Cape Town, Western Cape	1998; 28 years ago	
e.Sat TV	Television broadcasting; operator of eNCA	Johannesburg, Gauteng	2008; 18 years ago	
Platco Digital	Free-to-air satellite television; operator of Openview	Johannesburg, Gauteng	2013; 13 years ago	
Yired	Radio broadcasting; operator of YFM	Johannesburg, Gauteng	1997; 29 years ago	
Sasani Africa	Television and film production	Johannesburg, Gauteng	1996; 30 years ago	
Silverline Three-Sixty	Media and content-related operations	Johannesburg, Gauteng	2003; 23 years ago	
Sabido Properties	Property holdings and facilities	Johannesburg, Gauteng	2007; 19 years ago	
Crystal Brook Distribution	Distribution and related media services	Johannesburg, Gauteng	2005; 21 years ago	
Longkloof Limited	Property and facilities	Saint Peter Port, Guernsey	2001; 25 years ago	

== See also ==
- Media in South Africa
- Television in South Africa
