= Department of Economic Development (South Africa) =

Department overview
- Formed: 7 July 2009
- Type: Department
- Jurisdiction: Government of South Africa
- Headquarters: The DTI Campus, 77 Meintjies Street, Pretoria; 25°45′02″S 28°12′00″E
- Employees: 45 (2010/11)
- Annual budget: R595 million (2011/12)
- Minister responsible: Ebrahim Patel, Minister of Economic Development
- Deputy Minister responsible: Madala Masuku, Deputy Minister of Economic Development
- Department executive: Prof Richard Levin, Director-General: Economic Development
- Child agencies: Competition Commission; Competition Tribunal; Industrial Development Corporation (IDC); International Trade Administration Commission; Khula Enterprise Finance; South African Micro-finance Apex Fund
- Website: www.economic.gov.za

The Department of Economic Development was the department of the South African government responsible for economic policy, economic planning and economic development. It was established in 2009 after the election of President Jacob Zuma.

From 2009 to 2019, the Minister of Economic Development was Ebrahim Patel and his deputy is Madala Masuku. In the 2011/12 budget the department had a budget of R595 million and a staff complement of 45 civil servants.
