= Minister of Economic Development (South Africa) =

South Africa Minister of Economic Development
- Flag of South Africa

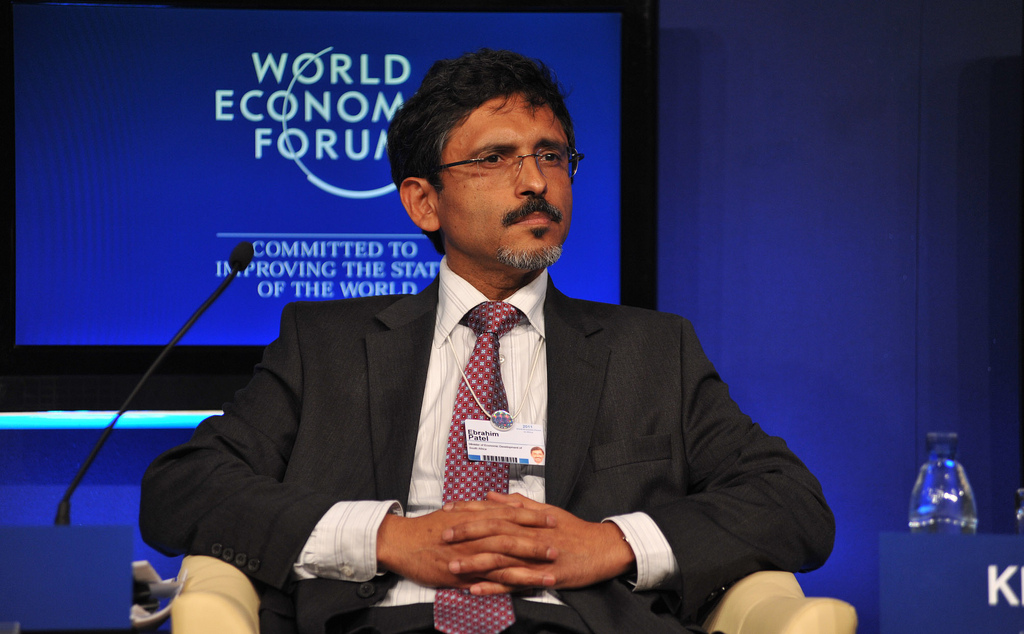
- Incumbent; Ebrahim Patel since 11 May 2009
- Department of Economic Development
- Style: The Honourable
- Appointer: Jacob Zuma
- Inaugural holder: Ebrahim Patel
- Formation: 10 May 2009
- Deputy: Madala Masuku
- Salary: R2,211,937
- Website: Department of Economic Development

The minister of economic development is a minister in the Cabinet of South Africa. Effective from 29 May 2019, the Ministry of Economic Development has been amalgamated with the Ministry of Trade and Industry to form the Ministry of Trade, Industry and Competition.
