= Nicoli Nattrass =

South African academic

- Born: 30 May 1961 (age 65)
- Occupation: Professor at University of Cape Town (UCT)
- Spouse: Jeremy Seekings
- Awards: UCT Book Award (2014, 2005); Bill Venter/Altron Literary Award (2008); UCT Distinguished Teacher Award (2001); Rhodes Scholarship (1984)

Academic background
- Education: Stellenbosch University (BA); University of Natal (MA); Oxford University (DPhil)
- Thesis: Wages, Profits and Apartheid (1991)
- Doctoral advisor: Andrew Glyn

Academic work
- Discipline: Economics
- Institutions: University of Cape Town
- Main interests: HIV/AIDS, political economy of South Africa, labour-intensive growth, human–wildlife conflict
- Notable works: The Moral Economy of AIDS in South Africa (2004); Class, Race, and Inequality in South Africa (2005)
- Influenced: Seth Kalichman

Nicoli Nattrass (born 30 May 1961) is a South African development economist who is professor of economics at the University of Cape Town (UCT). She is the co-director of the Institute for Communities and Wildlife in Africa (iCWild) and was the founding director of the Centre for Social Science Research (CSSR).

Nattrass's published work is mainly within the field of South African political economy. Her research interests include HIV/AIDS policy and denialism, labour-intensive growth, and human–wildlife conflict. She is also known for her 2005 book on inequality in South Africa, Class, Race and Inequality in South Africa (2005), which she co-wrote with her husband, Jeremy Seekings.

== Academic background ==
Born on 30 May 1961, Nattrass received her bachelor's degree from Stellenbosch University, an honours degree from the University of Cape Town, a master's degree from the University of Natal, and another Master's and a DPhil from Oxford University. In 1984, she was awarded the Rhodes Scholarship, which funded her doctoral studies at Magdalen College, Oxford.

== HIV/AIDS denialism ==
Nattrass was director of the AIDS and Society Research Unit at CSSR, which studied the socioeconomic and political impact of the HIV/AIDS epidemic in South Africa. Between 2002 and 2012, Nattrass published a number of academic articles and books that examined the history, sources, characteristics of HIV/AIDS denialism and its impact on HIV prevention and AIDS treatment.

In her book The Moral Economy of AIDS in South Africa (2004), written at the height of AIDS denialism, Nattrass repudiated the South African government's claim that antiretroviral drugs were unaffordable. She demonstrated that mother-to-child transmission prevention programs would be less costly to the government than treating sick children who acquired AIDS from their mother.

Nattrass's research on the cost-effectiveness of HIV medicines was submitted as evidence in the Treatment Action Campaign's lawsuit before the Constitutional Court, which culminated in a court order compelling the government to provide public access to antiretroviral treatment. Nattrass was critical of President Thabo Mbeki's HIV/AIDS policy, and she was threatened with libel charges by a government minister for documenting the South African Cabinet's support for unproven HIV treatments.

In a study published in 2008, Nattrass estimated that more than 340,000 unnecessary AIDS deaths in South Africa between 1999 and 2007 were the result of this policy. She attributed the slow and ineffective governmental response directly to the influence of AIDS denialists. The results of this study were later corroborated, using a different methodology, by scientists at Harvard University. They too modelled AIDS-related mortality and morbidity in South Africa as the result of the government's decision not to provide public access to HIV medicines.

In a 2012 article in Skeptical Inquirer and her book The AIDS Conspiracy: Science Fights Back (2012), Nattrass examines the landscape of the AIDS-denialist community and identifies four groups of characters who propagate denialism: hero scientists (provide scientific credibility); cultropreneurs (promote non-evidence based, unproven alternative treatment); living icons (proof that HIV is not the cause of AIDS) and praise singers (journalists and film makers who promote the cause). She also describes the campaign of pro-science activists to discredit AIDS conspiracy theories, defend evidence-based medicine, and combat pseudoscience.

== Other scholarship ==
=== Race and class ===
Nattrass has produced a large body of work with Jeremy Seekings on race and class in South Africa. In their first book, Class, Race, and Inequality in South Africa (2005), they argued that during the 20th century, race gave way to class as the driver of inequality in South Africa, especially after the rise in unemployment from the mid-1970s. Their later work, notably Policy, Politics and Poverty in South Africa (2015) and Inclusive Dualism (2019), highlighted growing class differentiation and the ongoing salience of race in South Africa.

=== Wildlife and conservation ===
At iCWild, where she is co-director, Nattrass studies human–wildlife conflict in Southern Africa. In 2020, she published a commentary in the South African Journal of Science that suggested that personal attitudes – attitudes towards wildlife and conservation, as well as materialist values – were more important than race in predicting study and career choices pertaining to wildlife conservation. Some critics read the commentary as replicating harmful racial stereotypes, leading to calls for the commentary to be withdrawn. Keyan Tomaselli later described the furore as a moral panic.

The Academy of Science of South Africa, which hosts the South African Journal of Science, issued a statement defending academic freedom and editorial independence, and announced that a special issue would be dedicated to debating the issue. The journal published a special issue on the Nattrass commentary, including a reply by Nattrass to critics, on 10 July 2020. Nattrass also defended herself in the media. The Democratic Alliance, South Africa's official opposition party, also came out in support of Nattrass and academic freedom and issued its own statement.

Nattrass's work on conservation includes papers on community based natural resource management in Namibia, wildlife in the Anthropocene, conservation conflict and the contested ethics of rodent control.

== Awards ==
The Moral Economy of AIDS won the 2008 Bill Venter/Altron Literary Award, a national prize for academic books, and both it and The AIDS Conspiracy won the UCT Book Award, the university's top prize for outstanding books by faculty. Nattrass also won UCT's 2001 Distinguished Teacher Award.
