= Jeremy Seekings =

South African academic

- Born: 3 January 1962 (age 64); London, England
- Occupation: Professor at the University of Cape Town
- Spouse: Nicoli Nattrass

Academic background
- Education: University of Oxford
- Thesis: Quiescence and the Transition to Confrontation in South African Townships, 1978–1984 (1990)

Academic work
- Discipline: Sociology, political studies
- Main interests: Inequality, social protection and poverty reduction, political parties
- Notable works: The UDF: The United Democratic Front in South Africa, 1983–1991 (2000); Class, Race, and Inequality in South Africa (2005)

Jeremy Seekings (born 3 January 1962) is a British-born academic who is professor of political studies and sociology at the University of Cape Town. He is the director of the university's Centre for Social Science Research.

== Academic background ==
Born on 3 January 1962 in London, England.

He was educated at Leighton Park School and completed his bachelor's degree in philosophy, politics, and economics at the University of Oxford and an honours degree in political studies at the University of the Witwatersrand. He completed his doctorate in politics at Oxford in 1990. At Oxford, he met his wife, Nicoli Nattrass, who was a South African on a Rhodes Scholarship.

He is professor of political studies and sociology at the University of Cape Town (UCT) where he has been director of the Centre for Social Science Research since 2012. He is a member of the Afrobarometer advisory team and a member of the Academy of Science of South Africa. He is also a former director of UCT's Institute for Democracy, Citizenship and Public Policy in Africa and was a longstanding visiting professor at the Yale MacMillan Center. He is a member of the UCT Senate, in which capacity he was an outspoken critic of former vice-chancellor Mamokgethi Phakeng and laid a formal bullying complaint against her in 2021.

== Scholarship ==
Seekings's first major monograph was The UDF: The United Democratic Front in South Africa, 1983–1991 (2000) on the history and politics of the United Democratic Front, a popular front against apartheid. It won the 2004 Bill Venter/Altron Award for academic literature and a 2003 book prize from UCT.

He won the Alan Pifer Award for his work with Nattrass on inequality in South Africa. In Class, Race, and Inequality in South Africa (2005), Seekings and Nattrass argued that class had superseded race as the primary basis of inequality in South Africa. Seekings has also published extensively on social welfare reform and the politics of social protection, primarily in Southern Africa.
