= Lance Taylor (economist) =

American economist

Lance J. Taylor
- Born: May 25, 1940; Montpelier, Idaho, US
- Died: August 15, 2022; Washington, Maine, US

Academic background
- Doctoral advisor: Hollis B. Chenery; Simon Kuznets

Academic work
- Doctoral students: William Easterly

Lance Jerome Taylor (May 25, 1940 to August 15, 2022) was an American economist who was known for his contributions to structuralist macroeconomics. He was the Arnhold Professor of International Cooperation and Development and director of the Center for Economic Policy Analysis at the New School for Social Research.

As a professor, he taught students who come in with "a critical attitude about economics," aiming to encourage that "progressive perspective" while providing them "the standard technical tools of economics." According to Taylor, structuralist economics sought to understand the macroeconomy through “its major institutions and distributive relationships across productive sectors and social groups."

He was a visiting scholar or policy advisor in over 25 countries, including Chile, Brazil, Mexico, Nicaragua, Cuba, Russia, Egypt, Tanzania, Zimbabwe, South Africa, Pakistan, India, and Thailand.

He taught and worked at the New School for Social Research since 1993. Taylor was previously associate professor of economics at Harvard and Professor of Economics at MIT, year-long visiting professorships at U. Minnesota, Univesidade de Brasilia, Delhi School of Economics, and Stockholm School of Economics. He received a B.S. degree with honors in mathematics from the California Institute of Technology in 1962 and, after study at Lund University (Sweden) and a Fulbright Fellowship in mathematics and economics, he received a Ph.D. in economics from Harvard University in 1968.

== Work in macroeconomics ==
Taylor published extensively in the fields of macroeconomics and development economics, focusing on the interaction of growth, stability and income distribution under different social relations. He contributed to the development of modern Computable General Equilibrium models. Using social accounting matrices of national economies, he worked to identify conditions that support healthy economics as opposed to those that yield economic crises, concluding in part that the conditions of each are complex and the particular sets of outcomes are often unanticipated. In the case of the recent economic crises, Taylor highlighted the conditions of financial deregulation and worsening income inequality.

More recently Taylor took up environmental macroeconomics, under standard and demand-driven growth models. In this work, he analyzed the short- and long-term social cost of greenhouse gasses and climate change, emission control legislation, and the role of green enterprise in economic recovery and sustainability, GDP and employment growth, and service-based economies.

== Awards and recognition ==
- 2015 Leontief Award, Global Development And Environment Institute, Tufts University
- "Lance Taylor (born 1940)" in P. Arestis and M. Sawyer (eds.), 2000, A Biographical Dictionary of Dissenting Economists, Hants, UK: Edward Elgar Publishing Ltd. A biographical dictionary of dissenting economists (Book, 2000) (WorldCat.org)
- Amitava Krishna Dutt and Jaime Ros Hants (eds.), 2003, Development Economics and Structuralist Macroeconomics: Essays in Honor of Lance Taylor UK: Edward Elgar
- Who's Who in America and The International Who's Who
- W. Arthur Lewis Lecturer, American Social Science Association meetings, 1985
- Marshall Lecturer, University of Cambridge, 1986-87
- V.K. Ramaswami Lecturer, Delhi School of Economics, 1988

== Selected publications ==
- 2013, co-editor with Armon Rezai and Thomas Michl, Social Fairness and Economics: Essays in the Spirit of Duncan Foley, New York: Routledge (Frontiers of Political Economy)
- 2010, 2010, Maynard's Revenge: The Collapse of Free Market Macroeconomics, Cambridge MA: Harvard University Press
- co-author with José Antonio Ocampo and Codrina Rada, 2009, Growth and Policy in Developing Countries: A Structuralist Approach, New York: Columbia University Press
- 2004, Reconstructing Macroeconomics: Structuralist Proposals and Critiques of the Mainstream, Cambridge: Harvard University Press
- co-author with Eatwell, J., 2000, Global finance at risk: the case for international regulation, New York: The New Press
- co-author with Alice Amsden and Jacek Kochanowicz, 1994, The Market Meets Its Match: Restructuring the Economies of Eastern Europe, Cambridge MA: Harvard University Press
- (ed.), 1993, The Rocky Road to Reform: Adjustment, Income Distribution, and Growth in the Developing World, Cambridge MA: MIT Press
- 1991, Income Distribution, Inflation, and Growth, Cambridge MA: MIT Press
- 1983, Structuralist macroeconomics: Applicable models for the third world, New York: Basic Books
- co-author with Krugman, P., 1978, "Contractionary effects of devaluation," Journal of International Economics, 8(3), 445–456.
- Lance Taylor publications indexed by Google Scholar
- "Lance Taylor". JSTOR.

== Personal life ==
Taylor and his wife, Yvonne Signe Margareta Johnsson Taylor, owned the Black Locust Farm in Washington, Maine. They had two children Ian Lance Taylor and Signe Marguerite Taylor, and three grandchildren Lyla Yvonne Taylor Stettenheim, Taylor Imogen Ross, and Soren Taylor Stettenheim.
