= Golden Arrow Bus Services =

Public transit company in Cape Town, South Africa

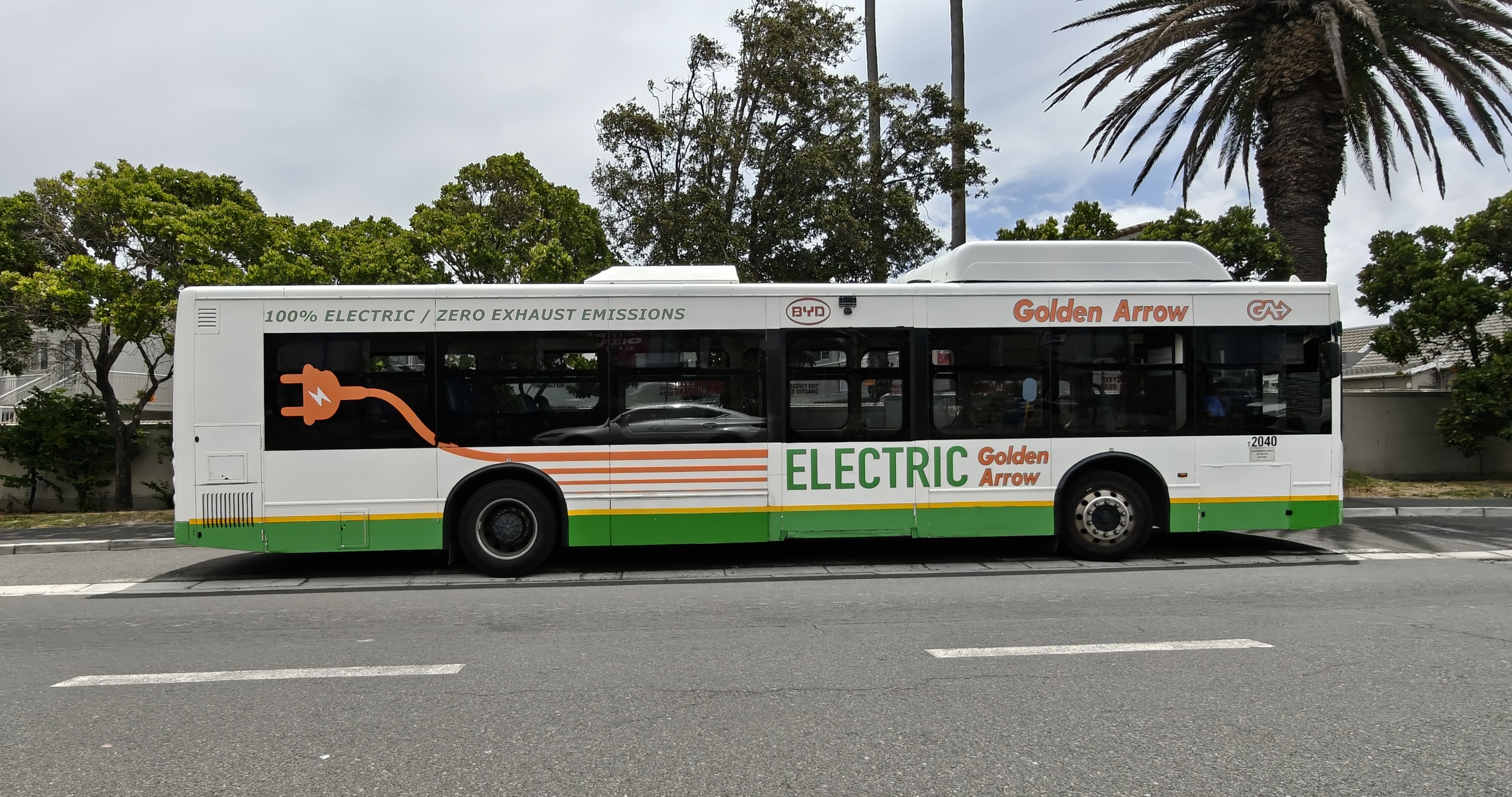
- Modern Golden Arrow BYD electric bus in Kirstenhof, Cape Town
- Parent: Hosken Consolidated Investments, via Frontier Transport Holdings
- Founded: 1861; 165 years ago
- Headquarters: 103 Bofors Circle, Epping, Cape Town, South Africa
- Service area: Cape Town, South Africa
- Service type: Public transport bus service
- Routes: 1,300
- Hubs: 7
- Fleet: ~ 1,300
- Daily ridership: 230,000 per day
- Fuel type: Electric; Diesel
- Chief executive: Francois Meyer (CEO)
- Website: www.gabs.co.za

Golden Arrow Bus Services (commonly referred to as Golden Arrow, and abbreviated to GABS) is one of two major public transport bus service operators in Cape Town, South Africa. The private company provides commuter bus services throughout a large part of the City of Cape Town metropolitan area.

Founded in 1861, the company is wholly owned by Frontier Transport Holdings, which itself is majority owned by South African holding company Hosken Consolidated Investments. GABS operates a fleet of around 1,300 electric and diesel buses on 1,300 routes, with a daily ridership of around 230,000 people. As of mid-2025, the company employed over 2,500 people.

== History ==
On 9 July 1861, an Act was passed that allowed for a company to be formed for the purpose of providing horse-drawn tram services between Sea Point and Cape Town. The founding company in the GABS dynasty was the Cape Town & Green Point Tramway Company, which began operating on the 1 April 1863.

Major technological innovations that shaped the fledgling industry subsequent to this were the replacement of horse-drawn trams with electric trams in 1894; the introduction of fuel powered motor buses in 1911 and trackless electric trams in 1934. During this period of innovation, mergers and acquisitions amongst competitors occurred.

In 1957, Golden Arrow Bus Services, which at the time had 85 buses and 400 employees, completed a take-over of the larger, listed Cape Tramways Limited, which had 500 buses and 2,000 employees.

In 1982, the company built its Arrowgate depot in the suburb of Montana, in Cape Town. At the time it was the largest and most modern depot in Southern Africa. GABS has also designed and built depot facilities in Woodstock, Philippi, Simon’s Town and Atlantis.

In 2004, South African holding company Hosken Consolidated Investments Limited acquired Golden Arrow Bus Services.

In 2011, Golden Arrow Bus Services took ownership of its 500th bus produced by German commercial vehicle manufacturer MAN Truck & Bus AG. MAN buses account for a large portion of GABS' fleet.

In 2013, Golden Arrow became one of the official operators of MyCiTi, Cape Town's bus rapid transit system. Through a subsidiary - Table Bay Rapid Transit (TBRT) - Golden Arrow The MyCiTi Atlantic Corridor service, from Table View to the CBD, as well as services from the CBD to Camps Bay.

In 2021 Golden Arrow announced that they had tested 3 electric buses and would put them in operation. This made Cape Townthe first city to implement electric buses in Africa.

Also in 2021 Golden Arrow celebrated its 160th anniversary of providing road-based public transport to the Cape Town community.

In March 2025, Golden Arrow added the first 20 electric buses to its fleet, with 100 more scheduled for rollout before the end of the year. The company has announced plans to convert its entire diesel fleet to electric buses.

In September 2025, it was reported that Golden Arrow had a total of 77 electric buses in its fleet, with more on the way.

== Operations ==
Golden Arrow operates 7 depots across Cape Town. These are located in Montana, Philippi, Woodstock, Atlantis, Simon's Town, and Blackheath.

Golden Arrow operates a fleet of both Electric and Diesel buses. Total diesel buses amount to 1,200 vehicles, while the number of electric buses is set to be 100 vehicles by the end of 2025. Electric buses are eBus B12 models, provided by BYD.

The eBus B12 electric buses that Golden Arrow has bought are 12.5 meters long, can take up to 65 passengers, use lithium iron phosphate batteries, and have an estimated range of just over 200 km.

Electric buses are charged at one of 30 charging units, which each have two charge points. These units are located at Golden Arrow-owned facilities. The company plans to double its number of charging units by the end of 2025. A total of 100 DC fast chargers (120kW), installed by Autel Intelligent Technology, are planned for the Arrowgate bus depot in Cape Town.

The company provides the option for prepaid ticketing, whereby riders can purchase an NFC (tap to pay) Gold Card, and load it with currency. Cards can be registered online. Golden Arrow provides discounted fares for weekly and monthly passes loaded onto the cards. Discounted fares are also available for students and pensioners. The peak period for fares is between 4PM and 8AM.

== Skills development ==
Golden Arrow Bus Services' Learning and Assessment Centre is accredited with the Transport Education and Training Authority (TETA) for all its professional driver training, and is also accredited with MerSETA. The Company utilizes a number of accredited service providers for management and leadership programs. Eligible employees are also able to access further study benefits from the company.

GABS facilitates the provision of the following accredited programs:

- Professional Driver Skills Program
- National Certificate in Professional Driving
- Automotive Repair and Retain Commercial Learnership
- Automotive Workshop Assistant
- Automotive Maintenance Assistant

== Gallery ==
Golden Arrow bus, manufactured by MAN, on the M4

Golden Arrow electric bus in Milnerton

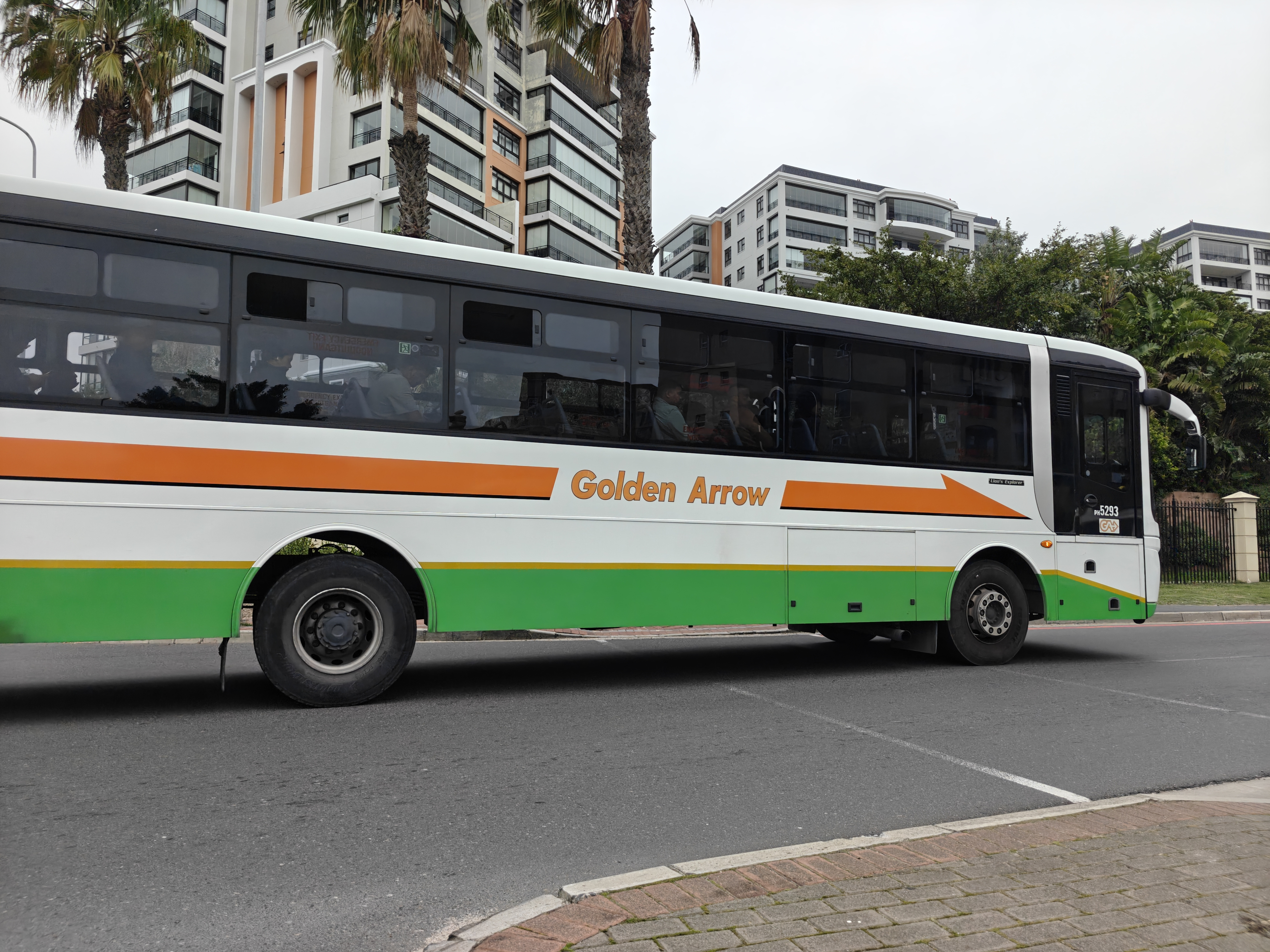
Bus in Century City, showing the white livery that replaced the old orange and yellow paintwork

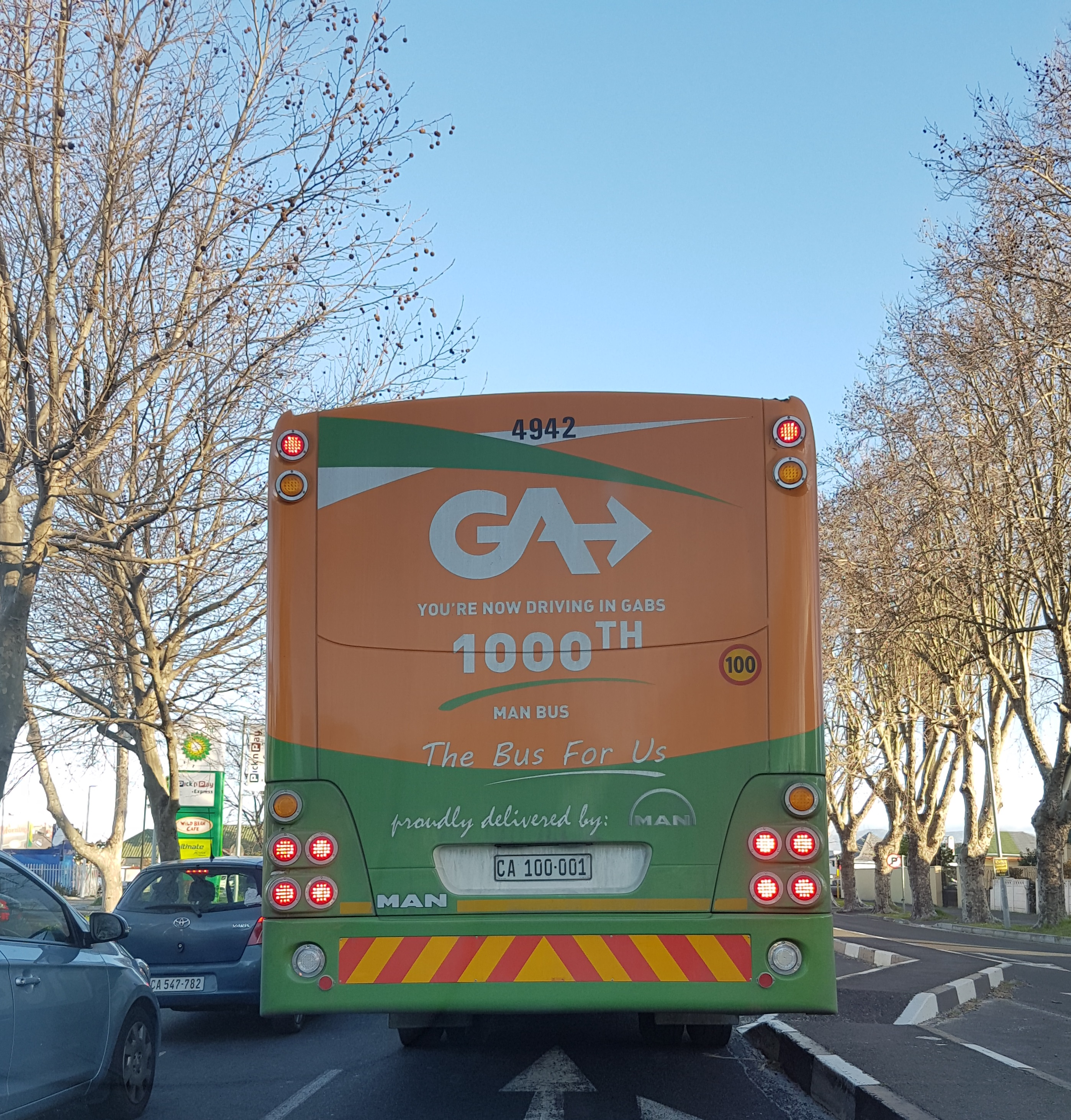
Livery celebrating a partnership with bus manufacturer MAN

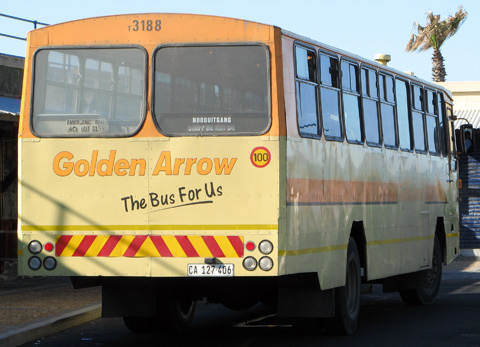
A now-defunct fleet vehicle, showing the company's old livery
