= Mariana Mazzucato =

Italian-American economist and professor (born 1968)

Mariana Mazzucato CBE
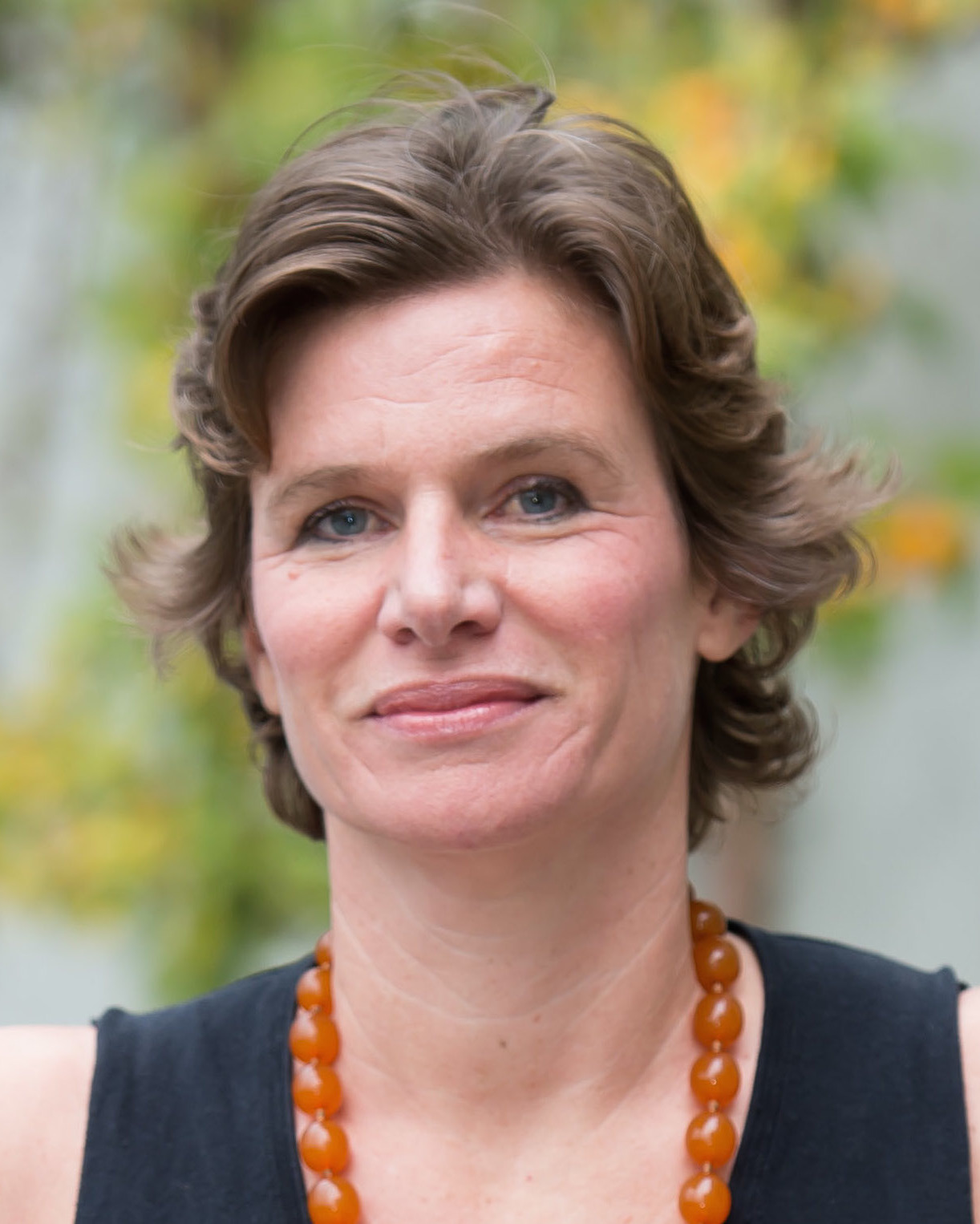
- Mazzucato in 2016
- Born: Mariana Francesca Mazzucato; June 16, 1968 (age 58); Rome, Italy
- Citizenship: Italian; American; British
- Spouse: Carlo Cresto-Dina

Academic background
- Education: The New School (PhD, 1999); Tufts University (B.A., 1990)
- Thesis: Four Essays on Evolutionary Market Share Dynamics: A Computational Approach (1998)
- Doctoral advisor: Willi Semmler
- Other advisors: Duncan K. Foley; Lance Taylor

Academic work
- Discipline: Economics
- School or tradition: Neo-Schumpeterian economics
- Institutions: University College London
- Website: marianamazzucato.com

Mariana Francesca Mazzucato (born June 16, 1968) is an Italian-American (Note: Mazzucato is described as "Italian-American" by several sources. She also has British citizenship.) economist and academic. She is a professor in the Economics of Innovation and Public Value at University College London (UCL) and founding director of the UCL Institute for Innovation and Public Purpose (IIPP). She is best known for her work on dynamics of technological change, the role of the public sector in innovation (including modern "mission-oriented" policies), and the concept of value in economics. The New Republic have called her one of the "most important thinkers about innovation".

Mazzucato has published widely in the fields of innovation economics, value theory and political economy, and more recently on climate change and the triple planetary crisis. She is the author of various books, including The Entrepreneurial State: Debunking Public vs. Private Sector Myths, The Value of Everything: Making and Taking in the Global Economy, and Mission Economy: A Moonshot Guide to Changing Capitalism. Her 2024 book, The Big Con: How the Consulting Industry Weakens our Businesses, Infantilizes our governments and Warps our Economies, co-authored with Rosie Collington, analyses the problematic relationship of the consulting industry to businesses and government administrations. In the 2026 book, The Common Good Economy, Mazzucato brings together new material and previous themes in attempting to provide a 'new compass' to think about economic issues.

Her career has emphasised translating economic ideas into policy and she holds numerous high-level policy roles. Mazzucato is currently a member of the UNESCO High Level Expert Group on Ecosystem Level AI Governance, and member of the WEF Centre for the New Economy and Society Advisory Board. She was also appointed member of the Presidential Economic Advisory Council (PEAC) of South Africa by President Cyril Ramaphosa in 2019. Previous roles include co-chairing the Group of Experts on the G20 Taskforce for the Global Mobilization against Climate Change alongside Vera Songwe, co-chairing the Global Commission on the Economics of Water (GCEW) with WTO Director-General Ngozi Okonjo-Iweala, Professor Johan Rockström and Singapore Senior Minister Tharman Shanmugaratnam; chair of the World Health Organization's Council on the Economics of Health for All, a member of the Scottish Government's Council of Economic Advisers, and the United Nations' High-Level Advisory Board on Economic and Social Affairs.

In 2021, in recognition of her contributions to economic theory and policy, Mazzucato received from the Italian President the Grand Officer grade of the Order of Merit of the Italian Republic, Italy's highest civilian honour.

== Early life and education ==
Mazzucato was born in Rome, Italy, to parents Ernesto Mazzucato, a physicist, and Alessandra Bardella, who are both Italian. Her elder sister is the agricultural economist, Africanist and Maastricht University professor Valentina Mazzucato. In 1972, the family moved to Princeton, New Jersey in the United States with their three young children, after Ernesto accepted a position at Princeton University's Plasma Physics Laboratory. Mazzucato spent most of her early life in the US before returning to Europe.

In 1986, Mazzucato graduated from Princeton High School. In 1990, Mazzucato received a B.A. in history and international relations from Tufts University. As an undergraduate student, she did an exchange program to Mexico City and attended the National Autonomous University of Mexico, where she studied for a year and was first introduced to the study of political economy. In 1994, Mazzucato received a M.A. in economics from the New School for Social Research before earning her PhD in economics at the New School in 1999. Her dissertation was titled Four Essays on Evolutionary Market Share Dynamics: A Computational Approach. Her thesis advisor was Willi Semmler, with Lance Taylor, Duncan K. Foley, and Charles Tilly as additional committee members.

== Career ==
=== Academic ===
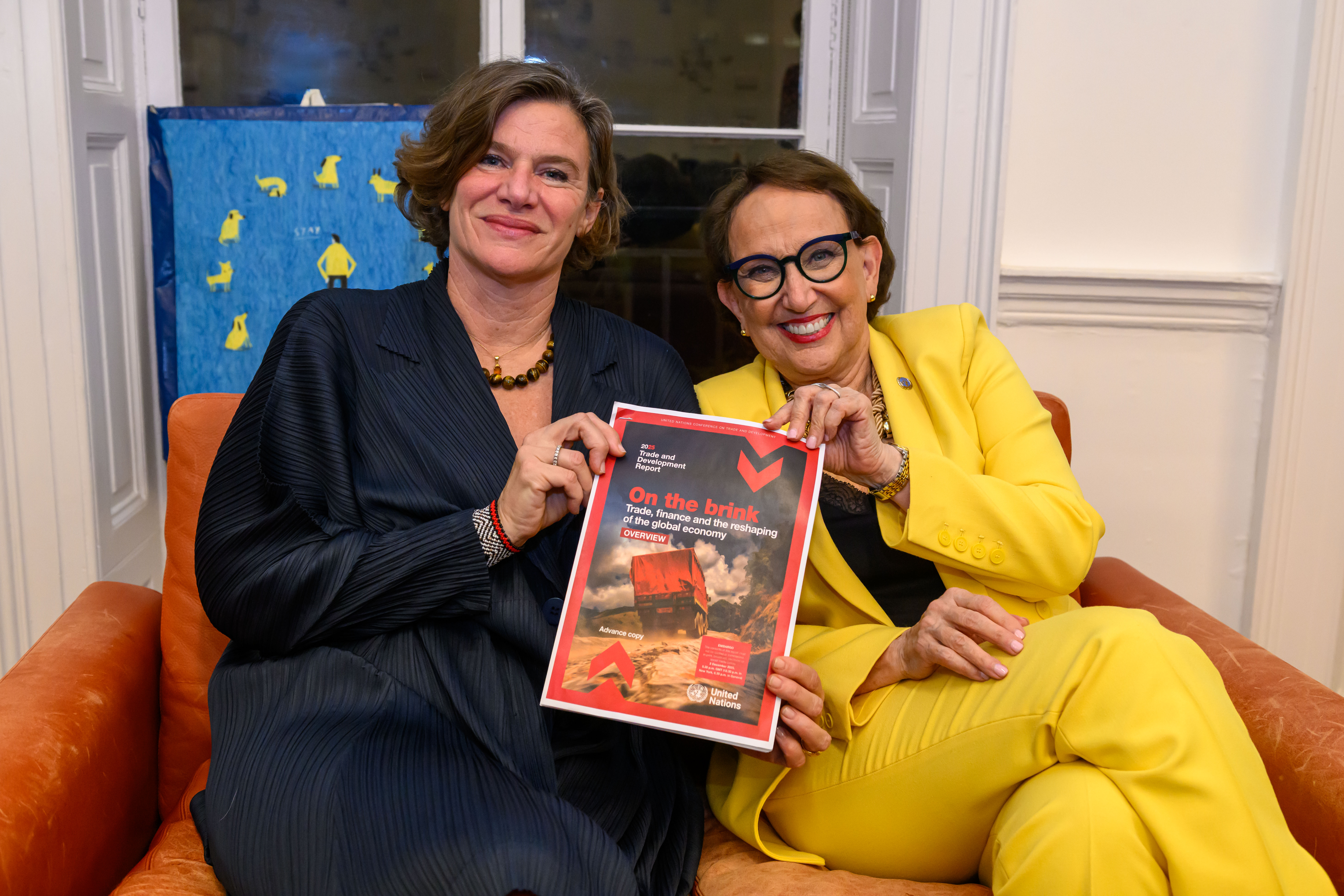
Professor Mariana Mazzucato and Rebeca Grynspan of UNCTAD in 2025

Mazzucato was Professor of Economics of Innovation and Public Value at University College London, where she founded the UCL Institute for Innovation and Public Purpose (IIPP) in 2017 to "explore how the public, private and third sector can work together in new and dynamic ways to drive innovation in order to tackle societal and technological challenges and shape and create new markets", building on Mazzucato's work on The Entrepreneurial State.

Her career began in 1995 as an adjunct professor of economics at New York University until 1997. She taught at the University of Denver between 1997 and 1999. Between 1998 and 1999 she was a post-doctoral Marie Curie Research Fellow at the London Business School where she worked closely with Paul Geroski. She joined The Open University in 1999 as a lecturer and became a full professor in 2005, where she founded their Innovation, Knowledge and Development research centre. From 2008 to 2010 she was a visiting professor at Bocconi University. In 2014, she was a distinguished visiting professor at the University of Technology Sydney. Between 2011 and 2017, she was the RM Phillips Chair in the Economics of Innovation at the University of Sussex before moving to University College London in 2017. In 2024 she co-founded the Strategic Economics Alliance, a global network amplifying the voices of female economists from the Global South in promoting new economic theory.

=== Economic advisory ===
Mazzucato has been active in advising governments on innovation, industrial strategy and growth policies. Between 2015 and 2019, she was a member of the international advisory panel of Sitra, the Finnish Innovation Fund. In 2018, she was co-chair of the Commission for Mission-Oriented Innovation and Industrial Strategy informing the Government of the United Kingdom's Industrial Strategy. In 2019, South African President Cyril Ramaphosa appointed Mazzucato to be a member of his Economic Advisory Council, a position where she remains active in providing recommendations for building sustainable and inclusive development.

Since 2020, Mazzucato has been a member of the Innovation Expert Group at the United Kingdom Department of Business, Energy and Industrial Strategy and a member international advisory panel of Vinnova, Sweden's innovation agency. In 2020, Italian Prime Minister Giuseppe Conte appointed Mazzucato as a Special Advisor on economic policy and made her Italy's representative economist on the G7 Panel on Economic Resilience which advised the G7 leaders at the 2021 G7 Summit in Cornwall, UK.

She is currently a member of the Council of Economic Advisors to the Scottish Government, a role she has held since 2015. She worked closely with the Scottish Government and First Minister in establishing the Scottish National Investment Bank in 2018. Between 2015 and 2016, she served on the British Labour Party's Economic Advisory Committee providing advice to the Shadow Cabinet.

As well as national governments, Mazzucato has also served as an economic advisor to international institutions, including the World Economic Forum, the European Commission, the World Health Organization, the OECD, and the United Nations Department of Economic and Social Affairs. From 2017 to 2021, Mazzucato sat on the United Nations Sustainable Development Solutions Network Leadership Council. She was a member of the European Commission's Task Force on Public Sector Innovation and their expert group on Innovation for Growth (RISE). From 2018 to 2019, she was Special Advisor to the European Commission's Commissioner for Research, Science and Innovation, Carlos Moedas.

In 2020, Tedros Adhanom Ghebreyesus, the Director-General of the World Health Organization, appointed Mazzucato as Chair of the World Health Organization's Council on the Economics of Health for All. From 2022 to 2023, she served on the European Space Agency's High-Level Advisory Group on Human and Robotic Space Exploration for Europe. Between 2022 and 2024 she co-chaired the OECD's Global Commission on the Economics of Water with Johan Rockström, Ngozi Okonjo-Iweala and Tharman Shanmugaratnam. In 2024, Brazilian president Lula Da Silva appointed her co-chair of the Group of Experts on the G20 Taskforce on a Global Mobilization against Climate Change with Vera Songwe. Mazzucato also served on the United Nations' High-Level Advisory Board on Economic and Social Affairs, the OECD High-Level Advisory Panel on Climate and Economic, the United Nations' Sustainable Development Solutions Network Leadership Council, the United Nations' Committee for Development Policy and the Commission for Universal Health convened by Chatham House.

In addition to formal appointments, Mazzucato and the UCL Institute for Innovation and Public Purpose have advised several government administrations on innovation policy and green growth in the United States, Brazil, Colombia and Barbados. Lessons from this work were shared on the IIPP report Mission-oriented industrial strategy: global insights, published in 2024.

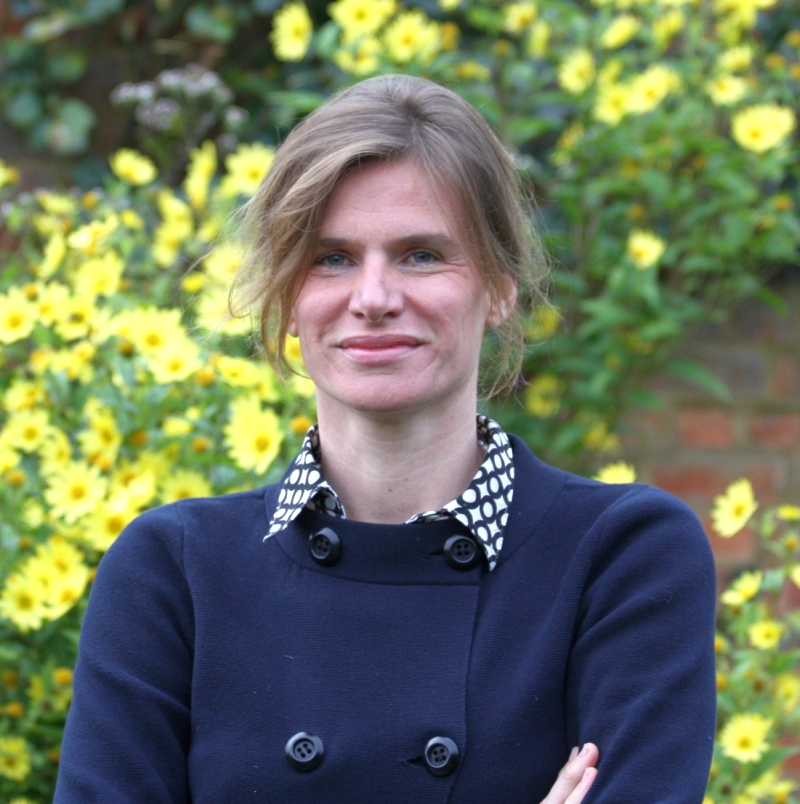
Mazzucato in 2010

Mazzucato has authored a number of policy reports, including Mission-Oriented Research & Innovation in the European Union, followed by the report Governing Missions in the European Union, which directly informed the EU's Horizon Europe research and innovation programme, and Transformational Change in Latin America and the Caribbean for ECLAC. Other relevant reports include the Global Commission on the Economics of Water Final Report on valuing the hydrological cycle as a global common good, and the report A green and just planet, authored by the G20 TF‑CLIMA Group of Experts, both published in 2024.

In April 2026, Whitechapel Gallery appointed Mazzucato as its first Economist-in-Residence for a three-year term ending in March 2029, a pro bono role focused on the economics and public value of arts and culture.

== Research ==
=== Innovation ===
Mazzucato's research has addressed the relationship between innovation, government policy, financial markets and economic growth, spanning the company, industry and national level. Much of her work has been inspired by the Schumpeterian framework of evolutionary economics. Her early research was on the origin and evolution of persistent differences between firms and the implications of this for industry life-cycles and differences in sector structure. Her empirical studies have focused on the automobile, PC, biotech and pharma industries.

In 2013, Mazzucato published her most famous work, The Entrepreneurial State. The book pointed to the key role that she believes government actors have played in driving radical innovations in their early stages, especially in the US. It outlined a number of case studies across different sectors - including biotech, pharmaceuticals and clean technology - to show that the high-risk investments have been made by the state before the private sector gets involved. In a well-known chapter examining the iPhone, she outlines how the technologies that make it 'smart' – the internet, GPS, its touchscreen display and the voice-activated Siri – were all government-funded. She argues in the book that public funds are laying the groundwork for the green revolution in a similar way to biotech and nanotech.

A major area of contribution has been the interaction between financial markets in technological change addressing both the positive and negative influences of financial actors on innovation. Earlier work had found that stock price volatility tends to be highest, at the firm and industry level, when technological innovation is the most radical. From 2009 to 2012, she was the Director of the FINNOV: Finance, Innovation & Growth research project, funded by the European Commission. Recent research of Mazzucato has highlighted the heterogeneity in the type of corporate finance offered by different institutional actors and the failure of private actors to provide sufficient "patient finance" that takes long term risk in areas such as renewable energy.

=== Value creation and market shaping ===
Later work has built on the conclusion of The Entrepreneurial State that the socialisation of risks for radical innovation requires rethinking how the rewards are privatised with the aim of producing more inclusive growth. In a joint 2013 article with William Lazonick, The Risk-Reward Nexus: Who takes the risks? Who gets the rewards?, she further described the tension between how value is created and how value is extracted in modern-day capitalism, producing a narrowing distribution of the rewards.

In 2018, Mazzucato published a second major book, The Value of Everything: making and taking in the global economy, which addressed the fundamental concept of value in economic theory. It traced the long and diverse history of theories of economic value and argued against the circular reasoning that emerged with Neoclassical economics where financial reward was seen as commensurate with creating real value. The book argues that some private companies act as rent-seekers rather than creating value themselves, and that current legislation encourages that type of behaviour.

=== Rethinking government ===
Mazzucato has developed a critique of market failure theory and argued for a concept that better captures the value that the state can create. This has led her to propose the state's role in the economy as one of creating and shaping new markets, emphasizing a "mission-oriented" way that addresses key societal challenges. Her third major book, Mission Economy: A Moonshot Guide to Changing Capitalism, summarises her arguments for improving state capabilities and re-orientating economic policy around ambitious missions with societal objectives. In 2023, she co-authored The Big Con: how the consulting industry weakens our businesses, infantilizes our governments, and warps our economies with Rosie Collington, then one of her PhD students. Building on Mazzucato's advocacy for the development of internal capabilities in public sector administrations, the book recounts the rise of the consulting industry and how over-reliance on consultants impedes the ability of public administrations to adequately manage innovation and relationships with the private sector.

== Reception ==
The Entrepreneurial State had a significant impact on the public debate around growth and innovation and brought a wider acceptance of the importance of the public sector's role, despite pushback from more right-wing commentators. Martin Wolf wrote in the Financial Times that The Entrepreneurial State offers "a controversial thesis" but "is basically right" and warns that the "failure to recognise the role of the government in driving innovation may well be the greatest threat to rising prosperity".

The Economist praised Mazzucato for highlighting the state's "central role in producing game-changing breakthroughs" and "contribution to the success of technology-based businesses", although it argued that in general, she was "too hard on business". The book was listed in the Financial Times Selection of Books of the Year in 2013 and won her the New Statesman/SPERI Prize in Political Economy in 2014.

The Value of Everything was also well received by reviewers and was shortlisted for that the 2018 Financial Times and McKinsey Business Book of the Year prize. The book was read by Pope Francis who commented "I believe [her vision] can help to think about the future".

Mission Economy received a more mixed reception and some commentators and fellow economists have been sceptical of Mazzucato's idealism on big government intervention. Diane Coyle argued that Mazzucato underplayed the risk of government failure and ignored potential issues with the incentives which govern public actors.

John Kay wrote in the Financial Times that "Mission Economy's proposals would lead to powerful governments driving and coordinating every stage of innovation to solve issues from cancer to climate change" but argues that such projects tend to be failures because political direction of innovation would have led to absence of objective feedback, whereas efficient progress tends to require very competitive markets with incremental innovation and power decentralized to individual entrepreneurs with their independent visions.

Swedish author and historian of ideas, Johan Norberg, dedicated almost an entire chapter in his 2023 book, The Capitalist Manifesto: Why the Global Free Market Will Save the World, to criticizing Mazzucato's work, stating, "The interesting thing is not that she is wrong again but that she is always wrong in the same way – she always believes it must involve a big, important plan and a massive government push."

Norberg furthermore criticized her method of using anecdotes and stories instead of rigorous analysis and research, stating:

...[Mazzucato] does not lean towards systematic research but instead tells various stories to show the government's involvement and success, and such anecdotes say nothing about overall effects. In addition, she fiddles with many of those stories. In an academic review, Christian Sandström objects that it is misleading to talk about everything important in a smartphone without mentioning the transistor, the integrated circuit, the digital image sensor and many other things developed by commercial interests.

Other economists have been more supportive of Mazzucato's faith in public policy and praised the application of the Apollo 11 archetype to modern challenges. Jayati Ghosh, writing for Nature, wrote that Mission Economy is a "timely and optimistic vision" of solving major problems through directed private and public investment which may seem simple and obvious, but implies revolutionising the role for governments.

In 2023, the New Statesman named Mazzucato as the thirty-second most powerful left-wing figure in the UK, crediting her with significantly influencing interventionist policy across the globe.

== Personal life ==
Mazzucato is married to Carlo Cresto-Dina, an Italian film producer, and they have four children.

== Media ==
Mazzucato writes op-eds for various national newspapers, including The Guardian, Financial Times, and The New York Times, and is a regular contributor to Project Syndicate, which shares articles for syndication in newspapers worldwide. Mazzucato frequently appears on news and current affairs programmes and delivers keynote talks at conferences. These include a number of highly viewed TED talks, as well as public lecture at various academic and government organizations around the world. She has also appeared on the left wing media network Novara media.

== Awards ==
- In 2016, Mazzucato became the first woman to give the Raúl Prebisch Lecture organised by the United Nations Economic Commission for Latin America and the Caribbean in Santiago, Chile.
- The 2018 Leontief Prize for Advancing the Frontiers of Economic Thought for her research focused on how governments foster innovation.
- The 2019 All European Academies Madame de Staël Prize for Cultural Values, honouring her contributions on the public sector role in fostering innovation.
- The 2020 John von Neumann Award, given annually by Rajk College to a social sciences scholar whose works have had substantial influence over a long period of time on the studies and intellectual activity of the students of the college.
- In 2021, she received the Grande Ufficiale Ordine al Merito della Repubblica Italiana, the highest civilian honour of the Italian state, in recognition of her contributions to economic theory and policy.
- In 2024, she won the Public Value Award in Lisbon, Portugal.
- Honorary Doctorates: National University of San Martín, Argentina (2016); Hasselt University, Belgium (2017); York University, UK (2020); Simon Fraser University, Canada (2020); Universitat Oberta de Catalunya (UOC - Open University of Catalonia), Spain (2022), University of Johannesburg, South Africa (2023), Universitat Politècnica de València, Spain (2023), and the University of Groningen, The Netherlands (2024).

== Selected works and publications ==
=== Books ===
- Mazzucato, Mariana; Dosi, Giovanni, eds. (2006). Knowledge Accumulation and Industry Evolution: The Case of Pharma-Biotech. Cambridge University Press. doi:10.1017/CBO9780511493232. ISBN 9780511493232. OCLC 938986701.
- Mazzucato, Mariana (2013). The Entrepreneurial State: Debunking Public vs. Private Myths in Risk and Innovation (PDF). London: Anthem Press. ISBN 978-0-857-28260-6. OCLC 880908782. Wikidata ()
- Jacobs, Michael; Mazzucato, Mariana, eds. (2016). Rethinking Capitalism: Economics and Policy for Sustainable and Inclusive Growth. London: Wiley-Blackwell. ISBN 978-1-119-31163-8. OCLC 954000776.
- Mazzucato, Mariana (2018). The Value of Everything: Makers and Takers in the Global Economy. London: Allen Lane-Penguin. ISBN 978-0-241-18882-8. OCLC 1049151753.
- Mazzucato, Mariana (2021). Mission Economy: A Moonshot Guide to Changing Capitalism. London: Allen Lane-Penguin. ISBN 978-0-241-41973-1. OCLC 1222804339.
- Mazzucato, Mariana; Collington, Rose, eds. (2023). The Big Con: How the Consulting Industry Weakens our Businesses, Infantilizes our Governments and Warps our Economies. London: Allen Lane-Penguin. ISBN 978-0-593-49267-3.
- Mazzucato, Mariana (June 2026). The common good economy: A new compass. London, United Kingdom: Allen Lane. ISBN 978-024172224-4. Hardback.

=== Selected publications ===
- Lazonick, William; Mazzucato, Mariana (July 24, 2013). "The risk-reward nexus in the innovation-inequality relationship: who takes the risks? Who gets the rewards?". Industrial and Corporate Change. 22 (4): 1093–1128. doi:10.1093/icc/dtt019.
- Mazzucato, Mariana; Semieniuk, Gregor (2018). "Financing renewable energy: Who is financing what and why it matters". Technological Forecasting and Social Change. 127: 8–22. doi:10.1016/j.techfore.2017.05.021.
- Mazzucato, M. (2018). 'Mission Oriented Innovation Policy: Challenges and Opportunities'. Industrial and Corporate Change, 27 (5): 803–815. https://doi.org/10.1093/icc/dty034
- Mazzucato, M., Kattel, R., & Ryan-Collins, J. (2019). 'Challenge-Driven Innovation Policy: Towards a New Policy Toolkit'. Journal of Industry, Competition and Trade, 20, 421–437. https://doi.org/10.1007/s10842-019-00329-w
- Mazzucato, M. and Kattel, R. (2020). 'COVID-19 and Public Sector Capacity.' Oxford Review of Economic Policy. https://doi.org/10.1093/oxrep/graa03
- Mazzucato, Mariana (2023) Governing the economics of the common good: from correcting market failures to shaping collective goals. Journal of Economic Policy Reform 27 (1), 1–24. https://doi.org/10.1080/17487870.2023.2280969
- Hill, Dan; Mazzucato, Mariana (2024). "Modern Housing: An environmental common good". Council on Urban Initiatives.
- Mazzucato, M. and Ghebreyesus T. (2024). "Advancing the economics of health for all". The Lancet, 404 (10457): 998–1000. https://doi.org/10.1016/S0140-6736(24)01873-7
- Mazzucato, M. (2025). Reimaging financing for the SDGs: from filling gaps to shaping finance. United Nations Department of Economic and Social Affairs (UN DESA) Policy Brief No. 170.

== See also ==
- Joseph Schumpeter
- John Maynard Keynes
- Giovanni Dosi
- Christopher Freeman
- Keith Pavitt
- Dani Rodrik
- Stephanie Kelton
- Carlota Pérez
- Joseph Stiglitz
