= The Big Con (Mazzucato and Collington book) =

Book by Mariana Mazzucato and Rosie Collington

The Big Con: How the Consulting Industry Weakens our Businesses, Infantilizes our Governments and Warps our Economies
- Book cover
- Author: Mariana Mazzucato and Rosie Collington
- Audio read by: Amy Finegan
- Language: English
- Subject: Political economy
- Published: 2023
- Publisher: Penguin Books
- Publication place: England
- Media type: Print and audio
- Pages: 368
- ISBN: 9781802060270
- OCLC: 1381295811
- Website: https://marianamazzucato.com/books/the-big-con/

The Big Con: How the Consulting Industry Weakens our Businesses, Infantilizes our Governments and Warps our Economies is a 2023 nonfiction book by economists Mariana Mazzucato and Rosie Collington. It argues that the overreliance on consultancies erodes government capabilities, and that consultancies perform a "confidence trick", overselling their value to potential clients in the absence of specific expertise.

The book proposes three solutions: require consultancies to declare conflicts of interest, rebuild public sector capabilities to become less dependent on consultancies and improve how the outcomes of contracts are evaluated. The Big Con received generally positive reviews, but some reviewers were critical of the unclear definition of value and the scarcity of evidence from outside the English-speaking world.

== Content ==
The Big Con mostly focuses on the Big Three management consultancies (Bain & Company, McKinsey and Boston Consulting Group) and the Big Four accounting consultancies (EY, PwC, KPMG, and Deloitte). Since the 1980s, governments in the UK and the US embraced Third Way ideas of a more limited role for governments. The public sector "should steer the boat, not row it", that is, outsource many public sector tasks to the private sector. The book argues that it is difficult to steer without the capacity to deliver.

The book argues against the idea that consultancies offer value for money for two reasons. The first is that consultancies might be rent-seeking, in the sense that they charge much more than equivalent public sector workers would be paid for the same work. Secondly, it is unclear how much value they add, as some reforms instated by consultancies had to be redone soon after. Consultancies, The Big Con argues, pull off a confidence trick to give the impression that they create value. The book for instance details how interviews work for the big consultancies; It's more important to come across as confident than propose sound ideas.

Big consultancies often work for both governments and business, even when the interests of their clients contradict each other. In the field of climate change, consultancies advise governments on how to decarbonise, while also getting money from fossil fuel companies with the opposite agenda.

The Big Con also examines failures of consultancies in the Global South, where consultancies often implement neoliberal free-market economic policies, often seen as neocolonial by the Global South. In one case study, McKinsey was contracted by the Puerto Rican government to help rebuild after it was hit by Hurricane Maria in 2017. This project was led by recent business graduates who applied a 'one-size-fits-all' process. This included privatisation and reducing labour rights. Consultancies also played a key role in capital flight from developing countries undergoing structural adjustment, in what the book calls 'transnational plunder networks'.

One of the impacts of embedding consultancies deep into the public sector is the erosion of opportunities for building internal capabilities. The Big Con details one strategy of consultancies: initial contracts to governments are offered at little cost. In subsequent phases, the government becomes dependent, having failed to build in-house expertise and thus feeling compelled to rely on consultancies for further work.

The book proposes three solutions to the problem: require consultancies to declare any conflict of interest they might have, rebuild public sector capabilities to become less dependent on consultancies and improve how the outcomes of contracts are evaluated.

== Reception ==
The book generally received positive reviews. The Times named The Big Con one of the five best business and technology books of 2023. The Financial Times and The Guardian both included the book in their "to read" lists for 2023. Nathan Akehurst called the book "meticulously researched" in a review for Jacobin and praised the book's ability to explain complex issues in simple terms. Mehdi Boussebaa, writing for the Journal of International Business Studies said that the book serves as a "much-needed wake-up call for businesses and governments".

One reviewer criticized the scarcity of evidence from the Global South. Boussebaa argues that while the book aims to tell a global story about consultancies, its evidence draws mainly from English-speaking countries. He also highlighted the limited engagement with how consulting firms relate to foreign direct investment and internationalisation of client companies.

Others critiqued the book's description of public value. Timothy Slaper, writing in Economic Development Quarterly, supported the critique of consultancy practices—especially how consultancies do not share in the risk of potentially bad advice—but found the discussion of public value theory unconvincing. He argued that the concept was poorly defined and weakened the book's central claims, suggesting the material might have been more effective in a separate book. Similarly, Akehurst felt the recommendations lacked clarity, noting that the book did not define what a "new theory of value" might entail as an alternative to the consultancy emphasis on efficiency.
