= The Entrepreneurial State =

2013 book written by Mariana Mazzucato

- First edition
- Author: Mariana Mazzucato
- Language: English
- Subject: Political economy
- Published: 2013
- Publisher: Anthem Press
- Publication place: England
- Media type: Print
- Pages: 261
- ISBN: 978-0857282521
- OCLC: 895004308
- Dewey Decimal: 338.04
- LC Class: HB615.M372797

The Entrepreneurial State: Debunking Public vs. Private Sector Myths is a 2013 book written by Mariana Mazzucato which argues that the United States' economic success is a result of public and state-funded investments in innovation and technology, rather than a result of the small state, free market doctrine that often receives credit for the country's strong economy. Mazzucato argues that understanding the difference between the "myth" and the reality of this success is particularly important saying: "If the rest of the world wants to emulate the US model, they should do as the United States actually did, not as they say they did".

The book was listed among the Financial Times best books of the year, and was reviewed in several publications including The New York Times and The Wall Street Journal. It is both praised and criticized by several social science journals and has started numerous discussions among economists and social scientists around the world about the role of the state in the world of technological innovations.

== Structure of the book ==
The beginning of the book focuses on changing the perception of the government from a bureaucratic machine that stands in the way of innovation, to government being the lead risk taker in terms of investing in innovations. She then details the history of how the US government is actually in many ways responsible for much of the large scale innovation which drove the country to economic success.

Next Mazzucato outlines the main points of an "Entrepreneurial State" (a state which is the primary risk taker in innovation based investments). After that she writes about the specifics of the state influences on innovation and technological developments within the private sector using Apple as an example, for the way they popularized the government created technologies of GPS navigation, touch screen technology, and voice recognition into the modern smartphone. She also gives the example of how the US National Science Foundation funded the algorithm which helped create Google's search engine. Mazzucato argues that the private sector makes up the last and least risky part of technological innovation and entrepreneurship.

After that Mazzucato adds a description of policies which could be implemented in the light of this new understanding of the role of government in entrepreneurship, most of which involve government sponsorship and research of new innovations rather than leaving that to private businesses.

Then she speaks about the "next big things" in terms of innovation, focusing mainly on green energy, and the role the state can play in ensuring these innovations make their way onto the world stage.

Lastly, Mazzucato makes an effort to combat the counter arguments to the Entrepreneurial State. Stating that while the state acting as an entrepreneurial risk taker is not always a reality it is an often overly dismissed possibility.

== Reception ==
The book was included in the list of best books of 2013 by the Financial Times.

Martin Wolf, chief economics commentator at the Financial Times, wrote a glowing review of the book, concluding: "This book has a controversial thesis. But it is basically right. The failure to recognise the role of the government in driving innovation may well be the greatest threat to rising prosperity." Similarly, Teresa Tritch concluded a favorable review of the book for the New York Times by noting: "The goal, as expressed by Professor Mazzucato, is not for taxpayer-provided research to spare the private sector from risks, but for government and the private sector to take risks together and enjoy the rewards as one." Writing for the Wall Street Journal, William Galston drew on the book to argue that government is a good venture capitalist, and cautioned that all the government programs that had led to great innovation were now subject to the budget sequester.

The Economist reviewed the book, praising it for acknowledging the role of governments in the private sector, but also criticizing Mazzucato for not acknowledging the many failed investments made by "entrepreneurial states" and what differentiates successful state investments from unsuccessful ones. Alberto Mingardi, a libertarian from Italy and director of the Italian free-market think tank Istituto Bruno Leoni, argued in his critique of the book that Mazzucato plays too much into what people want to hear. He also claimed the argument she makes for the government involvement in innovation is unconvincing and often self-contradictory.

Writing for The Guardian, Stian Westlake expressed reservations about using the book as a guide to policy. In particular, he noted that the book did not adequately acknowledge the fact that a lot of the gains from business innovation were already distributed to consumers (in the form of consumer surplus) and to governments (in the form of taxes on businesses). He also cited work by Jonathan Haskel which suggested that money spent on integrative investments (such as design, business model, supply chain) was about eight times the money spent on research and development. He also noted feasibility problems with Mazzucato's proposal to fund government research by levying additional taxes on businesses that used the results of the research.
