= Ellies Holdings =

Defunct South African electronics company

- Industry: Electronics
- Founded: 1979; 47 years ago
- Founder: Elliot Salkow
- Defunct: 2024; 2 years ago
- Fate: Liquidation
- Headquarters: Sandton, Gauteng, South Africa
- Area served: South Africa

Ellies Holdings Ltd, commonly referred to as Ellies, was a South African JSE-listed diversified electronics company. The business was liquidated in 2024.

== History ==
Ellies Electronics was founded in 1979 by Elliot Salkow, who initially operated from his garage, and sold aerials from the boot of his car.

=== Business rescue and liquidation ===
At the end of January 2024, the more than four-decade-old electronics group said it intended to enter business rescue amid the collapse of a crucial acquisition.

On 10 April 2024, its business rescue practitioner announced that there are no reasonable prospects of saving the business and that an application for a liquidation order will be made to the court.

The business rescue practitioner later clarified that the company's main operating subsidiary, Ellies Electronics, will continue to trade, and was on track to publish a proposed business rescue plan by 10 May 2024.

The Ellies brand (IP) was acquired by South African manufacturer SMD Technologies in July 2024.

== Operations ==
Ellies Holdings was a distributor of TV aerials and installation equipment, as well as a manufacturer of industrial audio electronic and electrical equipment under the 'Ellies' brand, and satellite and associated equipment under the 'ElSat' brand.

Through Megatron Federal, Ellies was involved in power infrastructure (generation, transmission and distribution). The company also entered the renewable energy and internet connectivity markets via satellite sectors, through joint ventures with In-toto Technology Investments and Q-KON respectively.

== Elliot Salkow ==
Elliot Salkow, year unknown

Elliot "Ellie" Salkow (1953–2021) was a South African entrepreneur and founder of Ellies Holdings. He was named among the top 10 wealthiest South Africans in 2013 by the Sunday Times. Salkow was born in 1953 and grew up in Johannesburg with two sisters. He sold mirrors and worked as a delivery man.

In 1979, Salkow founded Ellies Electronics, initially operating the business from his garage. The company sold television aerials and later, a supplier and installer of satellite dishes and decoders. In 2013, Salkow's wealth was reportedly an approximate of R880 million.

Salkow transitioned to a non-executive director role at Ellies Electronics in 2019 and retired from active management a year later. In 2019, he established Invest Solar. Salkow died in 2021 at the age of 68, survived by his wife, children, and sisters.
