= Johnny Copelyn =

South African businessman and former trade unionist

Member of the National Assembly
- In office 1994–1997

Personal details
- Born: John Anthony Copelyn; 1949 or 1950 (age 75–76)
- Citizenship: South Africa
- Party: African National Congress
- Education: Witwatersrand University

John Anthony Copelyn (born 1949 or 1950) is a South African businessman and former trade unionist who has been a chief executive officer of Hosken Consolidated Investments (HCI) since 1997. He entered the company as the head of the investment wing of the Southern African Clothing and Textile Workers Union (SACTWU), where he was formerly general secretary.

Copelyn's union career began during apartheid at the National Union of Textile Workers, later merged into SACTWU. While running SACTWU's investment wing in the mid-1990s, he represented the African National Congress in the National Assembly during the first post-apartheid Parliament in 1994. He resigned from his parliamentary seat in 1997 to take over HCI, henceforth running it as a private-equity holding company, with his erstwhile business partner, fellow former unionist Marcel Golding. As of 2022, Copelyn's personal stake in HCI was worth nearly R1 billion.

== Early life and union career ==
Copelyn was born in 1949 or 1950. He is descended from Lithuanian Jews and joined Habonim as a teenager. He attended the University of the Witwatersrand, completing a Bachelor of Arts in 1973; his unpublished honours thesis on the Pondoland revolt, completed the following year, is still widely cited in academia. After finishing university, Copelyn moved to Durban in 1974, shortly after the 1973 Durban strikes, to join the trade union movement; his first job was as editor of the newly launched South African Labour Bulletin. He soon became a national organiser for the National Union of Textile Workers (NUTW). Banned by the apartheid government in November 1976, he spent the next few years training as an attorney.

Not long after NUTW was merged into the Southern African Clothing and Textile Workers Union (SACTWU), Copelyn became its general secretary, succeeding Lionel October. SACTWU, like NUTW, was an affiliate of the Congress of South African Trade Unions (COSATU), which was aligned to the anti-apartheid African National Congress (ANC) and subscribed to the Freedom Charter; in the debate between so-called "charterists" (who viewed the unions primarily as vehicles of the anti-apartheid movement) and "workerists" (who did not), Copelyn was firmly on the side of the workerists and advocated for the independence of unions from the ANC and South African Communist Party.

== Parliament: 1994–1997 ==
In the 1994 general election, South Africa's first under universal suffrage, Copelyn stood as one of 20 candidates nominated to the ANC's party list by COSATU in terms of the Tripartite Alliance. He was elected to a seat in the National Assembly, the lower house of the new South African Parliament. He served in the seat until 1997. During the same period, he was chief executive officer of the SACTWU investment company, the union's investment wing, and acted as an investment advisor to COSATU. In this capacity he struck up a partnership with his friend and counterpart in the National Union of Mineworkers's investment wing, Marcel Golding.

== Hosken Consolidated Investments: 1997–present ==
Copelyn and Golding resigned from Parliament in 1997 to run Hosken Consolidated Investments (HCI), a holding company headquartered in Cape Town and publicly listed on the Johannesburg Stock Exchange (JSE). They obtained a controlling stake in HCI by reversing a number of the unions' investment companies' assets. Copelyn was installed as chief executive officer and Golding as executive chairperson. HCI operated as a private-equity holding company and made investments in media, casinos, and other sectors. In the mid-2000s, the company was known for its campaign to build a controlling stake in Tsogo Sun, which led to a hostile takeover of Cyril Ramaphosa's Johnnic in 2005–2006; Copelyn also serviced as chief executive officer at Johnnic.

=== Union investment model ===
The model of union investment pioneered by Copelyn and Golding through HCI was controversial among leftists and in some accounts promoted the rise of "business unionism". Copelyn continued to run the SACTWU investment company, the major shareholder in HCI; the investment company grew from start-up capital of R15.6 million (R2 million from union savings and a R13.6-million loan from the Industrial Development Corporation) to a value of more than R7.5 billion in 2016. Explaining his ambitious approach to union investments in the mid-1990s, Copelyn later said, "There were too many opportunities to simply close one's eyes and throw up one's purist hands in disgust. It was a moment that, if we hesitated, would be gone". Copelyn pointed out that HCI benefitted SACTWU members not only by way of the union's investment company but also through HCI's social responsibility projects and investments in the clothing and textiles sector – notably Seardel, which HCI made a substantial investment in at a time when it was the largest employer of clothing workers in South Africa.

Even more controversial, Copelyn himself became personally wealthy through share participation rights and directorship fees amassed as a result of HCI's activities, primarily through black economic empowerment deals that HCI was eligible for because its union shareholders were majority black. Copelyn owned ten per cent of HCI – listed shares worth about R358 million – by July 2005, and 13.9 per cent by the end of the year. His stake was worth R837 million by 2014 and close to R1 billion in 2022. On the point of his personal wealth, Copelyn argued that his wealth was not the result of empowerment deals, but that he and Golding had concentrated their personal stakes in HCI – and that of SACTWU – in January 2002, when HCI was pressured by institutional shareholders to offer them exit via share repurchase; according to Copelyn, institutional shareholders were nervous about the prospects of HCI's new media venture, e.TV, but he and Golding had been confident that HCI's shares were undervalued and had maintained their shareholdings. He later said of this period, "We [Copelyn and Golding] risked everything we had, as well as everything we might ever have for the rest of our lives... It was absolutely not an empowerment deal but was a public offer in our personal capacities at a time the world deserted us."

=== e.TV and Marcel Golding's exit ===
In October 2014, Golding was suspended from his HCI chairmanship pending disciplinary charges in connection with an unauthorised purchase of shares in Ellies. Following an abortive court challenge, Golding resigned from all his HCI positions later the same week. He claimed that he had been suspended as punishment for refusing to yield to political pressure at e.TV, HCI's television news channel: according to Golding, Copelyn and HCI executive director Yunus Shaik (brother of Moe and Schabir) had driving "attempts to push me out" after Golding refused to ensure that e.TV provided favourable coverage of President Jacob Zuma in the run-up to the 2014 general election. In the aftermath, Barbara Hogan, an independent non-executive director at HCI, also resigned, saying that she was uneasy about the board's handling of the dispute and its broader handling of its media interests generally.

Golding and Copelyn's parting was made official at a shareholder meeting at the end of October. Copelyn vigorously denied Golding's allegation of political interference at e.TV and continued to maintain that editorial standards had been irrelevant to Golding's suspension. Both the Business Day and the Sunday Times reported that Copelyn and Golding's relationship had been deteriorating for some time before the disciplinary charges were lodged.

=== Oil and gas ===
HCI is a major investor in British-based Impact Oil and Gas, which in 2014 controversially secured oil-and-gas exploration rights off the Wild Coast of South Africa's Eastern Cape. The exploration, which was to be operated by Shell, has been contested in South African courts. Copelyn became a non-executive director of Impact in 2014 and took over as non-executive chairman in 2020, around the same time that the company obtained an interest in a second Wild Coast exploration zone; former COSATU general secretary Jay Naidoo has been publicly critical of Copelyn's role in the initiative.
