= Hosken Consolidated Investments =

South African investment holding company

- Trade name: HCI
- Type: Public
- Traded as: JSE: HCI
- ISIN: ZAE000003257
- Industry: Investment holdings Finance
- Founded: 11 June 1973; 53 years ago
- Founder: Marcel Golding; John Copelyn
- Headquarters: Cape Town, South Africa
- Area served: Worldwide
- Key people: John Copelyn (CEO); Velaphi Mphande (Chairman)
- Services: Investments
- Revenue: ▲ R14.23 billion (2026)
- Operating income: ▲ R4.29 billion (2026)
- Net income: ▼ R2.54 billion (2026)
- Total assets: ▼ R64.18 billion (2026)
- Total equity: ▲ R39.55 billion (2026)
- Number of employees: 3,613 (2026)
- Divisions: HCI Properties; HCI Resources
- Website: hci.co.za

Hosken Consolidated Investments (HCI) is a South African holding company with investments in the gambling, hotels, properties, mining, transport, and media sectors.

It is the majority shareholder of eMedia Holdings, which itself owns e.tv, the first South African free-to-air private television channel. Hosken is also the majority owner of hospitality company Tsogo Sun and commuter transit company Golden Arrow Bus Services.

Based in Cape Town, HCI was founded in 1973 and is listed on the Johannesburg Stock Exchange. Johnny Copelyn, a unionist and former politician, has been the company's CEO since 1997.

== History ==
HCI was founded in 1973 by Marcel Golding and John Copelyn.

In 1997, politician Johnny Copelyn left Parliament to lead HCI. By 2000, a number of financial institutions had lost trust in the investment company, and offered them an option to exit e.tv's control.

In 2005, Cyril Ramaphosa (at the time of Johnnic) was involved in a failed bid to take over HCI's casino and real estate assets. HCI was bidding for majority control of the company, which was the investment fund's crown jewel back then. Regulators approved HCI's takeover of Johnnic on 7 December, but with one condition, HCI would dispose of its control of the Gallagher Estate which houses the Pan-African Parliament. In January 2006, four of Johnnic's directors, including Ramaphosa, resigned from the subsidiary.

Marcel Golding resigned from his post on 22 October 2014, causing a 2% fall in shares at the Johannesburg Stock Exchange. His investment in Sabido, the subsidiary that ran e.tv at the time, lacked board approval Barbara Hogan left a few days later, similar to what happened to Golding, after accusations of political interference on e.tv. Fallout from these resignations caused e.tv's CEO Bronwyn Keene-Young to withdraw from her post. On 1 December 2014, it announced that it would buy back 300 million rand from the management.

In August 2022, HCI refused a proposal to become a minority shareholder in the Venus oil deposit off Namibia. It did however own an indirect 10% share, as HCI at the time had acquired 49,9% of British company Impact Oil.

== Assets ==
As of 2026, HCI's investment holding portfolio includes:

| Industry | Company | Year of investment | Current shareholding | Ref. |
|---|---|---|---|---|
| Media and broadcasting | eMedia Holdings | 2001; 25 years ago | 54.06% | |
| Media and broadcasting | YFM | 1997; 29 years ago | 54% | |
| Gambling | Tsogo Sun | 2002; 24 years ago | 53.1% | |
| Gambling | SunWest International | 2002; 24 years ago | 20% | |
| Gambling | Worcester Casino | 2002; 24 years ago | 20% | |
| Hospitality | Southern Sun | 2002; 24 years ago | 45.8% | |
| Hospitality | Gallagher Convention Centre | 2005; 21 years ago | 100% | |
| Manufacturing | Deneb Investments | 2014; 12 years ago | 84.2% | |
| Manufacturing | Paarl-Vallei Botteleringsmaatskappy | 2025; 1 year ago | 52.7% | |
| Transport | Alpine Truck and Bus | 2021; 5 years ago | 41.1% | |
| Transport | Golden Arrow Bus Services (via Frontier Transport Holdings) | 2004; 22 years ago | 80.6% | |
| Mining | HCI Resources | 2006; 20 years ago | 100% | |
| Mining | Platinum Group Metals | 2018; 8 years ago | 22.5% | |
| Mining | HCI Coal | 2006; 20 years ago | 100% | |
| Oil and gas | Impact Oil & Gas | 2018; 8 years ago | 51.6% | |
| Oil and gas | Africa Energy Corp. | 2025; 1 year ago | 42.5% | |
| Oil and gas | La Concorde Holdings | 2011; 15 years ago | 90.0% | |
| Real estate | HCI Properties | 2005; 21 years ago | 100% | |
| Golf technology | Inrange Golf | 2018; 8 years ago | 42.4% | |
