= Inequality in post-apartheid South Africa =

South Africa is one of the world's most unequal countries due to the legacy of colonial and apartheid laws which restricted the black majority in the country from equal economic opportunity and confined land to the white minority. Since the end of apartheid in 1994, the South African government has embarked on reforms to alleviate inequality in South Africa, including market-based reforms to redistribute land. The end of apartheid substantially improved quality of life in South Africa, expanded access to housing and basic services, and increased government accountability. While racial inequality has declined, social inequalities nonetheless persist.

White nepotism remains a considerable obstacle to economic gain and political influence for Black South Africans. Despite a growing gross domestic product, indices for poverty, unemployment, income inequality, life expectancy and land ownership, have declined. No industry in the economy has over 50% ownership by Black individuals in terms of their share even though 81.4% of the South African population is Black. A small subset of the Black population have been able to create a Black middle class that did not exist during apartheid, but otherwise, the large majority of Black people in South Africa have yet to experience a difference in economic class since apartheid was abolished. International measures of inequality, such as the Gini coefficient, report that inequalities within races has greatly increased since the end of apartheid, even when overall inequalities are slightly improved. High levels of Black unemployment coupled with a rising Black population remains one of the biggest problems, particularly for women and the uneducated or unskilled.

South Africa's most recent census in 2022 highlighted areas of supposed improvement, such as greater access to electricity, piped water, education, and refuse collection services, but was criticized for missing 31% of the largely rural population. The South African government has been denounced because it does not have an official poverty line, preventing accurate measures from being assessed. The most recent census did not include measures of income previously used to define poverty in prior censuses nor did it give an official population percentage, but international organizations have placed the percentage of South African people experiencing poverty to at least 50% and possibly even higher after the effects of the COVID-19 pandemic.

== Factors contributing to post-apartheid inequality in South Africa ==
=== Key legislation shaping post-apartheid inequality ===
South Africa has a very high unemployment rate, officially 31.9% as of Q3 in 2023. Redistribution aims to transfer white-owned commercial farms to Black South Africans. Restitution involves giving compensation to land lost to whites due to apartheid, racism, and discrimination. Land tenure reform strives to provide more secure access to land. Several laws have been enacted to facilitate redistribution, restitution, and land tenure reform. The Provision of Certain Land of Settlement Act of 1996 designates land for settlement purposes and ensures financial assistance to those seeking to acquire land. The Restitution of Land Rights Act of 1994 guided the implementation of restitution and gave it a legal basis. The Extension of Security of Tenure Act of 1996 helps rural communities obtain stronger rights to their land and regulates the relationships between owners of rural land and those living on it. So far, these land reform measures have been semi-effective. By 1998, over 250,000 Black South Africans received land as a result of the Land Redistribution Programme. Very few restitution claims have been resolved. In the five years following the land reform programmes were instituted, only 1% of land changed hands, despite the African National Congress’s goal of 30%. The Reconstruction and Development Programme (RDP) was a socio-economic programme aimed at addressing racial inequalities by creating business and education while only 4% of the wealthiest students are functionally illiterate, indicating a stark divide in literacy between income quartiles.

=== Educational disparities ===
The spatial segregation of apartheid continues to affect educational opportunities. Black and low-income students face geographic barriers to good schools, which are usually located in affluent neighborhoods. While South Africans enter higher education in increasing numbers, there is still a stark difference in the racial distribution of these students.

As of 2013, the global competitiveness survey ranked South Africa last out of 148 for the quality of maths and science education and 146th out of 148 for the quality of general education, behind almost all African countries despite one of the largest budgets for education on the African continent. The same report lists the biggest obstacle to doing business as an "Inadequately educated workforce". Education, therefore, remains one of the poorest areas of performance in post-apartheid South Africa and one of the biggest causes of continued inequality and poverty.

=== Impacts of the COVID-19 pandemic ===
The COVID-19 pandemic has served to widen the gaps between existing levels of economic inequality in South Africa, and poor, Black communities have been given the greatest burden largely due to insufficient government support during the pandemic. South Africa was criticized early for not enacting a travel ban on international travelers as COVID-19 began ravaging other countries. However, South Africa was quick to respond to the COVID-19 pandemic on the arrival of its first reported case as compared to Western countries, implementing a 6-week lock down only 22 days after the first confirmed case of COVID-19 was reported in South Africa early in March. Restrictions included a ban on international travelers, school closures, and the prohibition of large group gatherings including 100 people or more. School closures threatened food security for 9 million children who relied on school feeding programs to supplement daily nutrition with no back-up plan given by the government. Two weeks into the lock down further rules were implemented, including the closure of non-essential businesses and a controversial sales ban on liquor, tobacco, and vaping products. Close to 10 million low-income individuals lost their jobs during this time.

As the 6-week lock down came to an end, South Africa began to reduce the severity of lock down rules, citing successful containment, but the South African government was criticized for inflating positive results of early containment procedures without evidence to support their claims. Hospitals already lacked the resources to handle their pre-COVID case loads and were quickly overwhelmed with COVID-19 cases early on in the pandemic, necessitating other health problems to be sidelined. Domestic violence cases against women and children in the lower economic classes skyrocketed. An emergency food box program was eventually created to fight food insecurity, but most poor communities never received the help. Less than 100,000 of the boxes were distributed across South Africa in the first year and a half of the program's creation. Economically disadvantaged communities found immense fault with the inequitable government efforts regarding food allocation, testing centers, and the distribution of personal protective equipment (PPE). Brewing public frustration over economic losses, lock down measures, the lack of available medical interventions, and the arrest of former South African president Jacob Zuma resulted in widely attended protests that devolved into destructive riots in KwaZulu-Natal and Johannesburg in 2021. The events now known as the 2021 South African unrest, the Zuma riots, or the July 2021 riots, escalated into the most severe violence South Africa has witnessed since the conclusion of apartheid, and resulted in the arrests of over 5,500 individuals and the deaths of 354.

== Wealth inequality ==
According to the World Bank, South Africa is the most economically unequal country in the world. The difference between the wealthy and the poor in South Africa has been increasing steadily since the end of apartheid in 1994, and this inequality is closely linked to racial divisions in society. The reason for South Africa's economic inequality being closely linked to racial divisions is due to historic systems of racial hierarchy. The system of Apartheid that existed in South Africa before 1994 concentrated power in the hands of the white minority who used this power to deny economic opportunity to the black majority. For example, the Apartheid regime barred Blacks from working and living in cities to keep them out of skilled labour positions. This ban was only lifted in 1973 due to shortages of workers in the manufacturing sector. This system of denying Blacks economic opportunity resulted in significant economic inequality that persists to the present day and can be seen in all sectors including land ownership, educational opportunities, recreational spaces, housing and jobs.

== See also ==
- Apartheid in South Africa
- Negotiations to end apartheid in South Africa
- Crime of apartheid
- Sexual violence in South Africa
