= Briggs (surname) =

Surname list

Briggs is a Northern English surname found mainly in West Yorkshire and derives from the Old Norse word bryggja meaning "bridge", and could also be related to the British Brigantes who once settled Yorkshire in the ancient Brythonic kingdom of Brigantia. Notable people with the surname include:

- Adam Briggs (born 1986), stage name Briggs (rapper), Australian rapper
- Albertus Theodore Briggs (1862–1937), American clergyman
- Alfie Briggs (1888–1952), Scottish footballer
- Allan Briggs (businessman), founder of Briggs Communications
- Allan Briggs (sport shooter) (1873–1951), American Olympic sport shooter
- Andrew Briggs (George Andrew Davidson Briggs, born 1950) British scientist
- Andy Briggs (born 1972), British author and screenwriter
- Andy Briggs (businessman) (born 1966), British insurance executive
- Anna Beecroft Briggs (1860s–1949), Canadian-born American playwright
- Ann-Kio Briggs (born 1952), English-born Nigerian environmental and human rights activist
- Anne Briggs (born 1944), English folk singer
- Annie M. Briggs (born 1987), Canadian actress
- Ansel Briggs (1806–1881), American politician
- Arthur E. Briggs (1881–1969), California teacher, law school dean and politician
- Asa Briggs (1921–2016), English historian
- Barbara G. Briggs (born 1934), Australian botanist
- Barry Briggs (born 1934), New Zealand World Motorcycle speedway champion
- Benjamin Briggs (1835–1872), captain of the Mary Celeste
- Bill Briggs (disambiguation), multiple people
- Billy Briggs (born 1977), American musician
- Bob Briggs (American football) (1945–1997), in American Football League and NFL
- Bob Briggs (Australian footballer) (1883–1955), Australian rules footballer
- Bob Briggs (chemist) (1905–1975), New Zealand organic chemist
- Carlos Briggs (born 1964), American basketball player
- Charlie or Charles Briggs (disambiguation), multiple people
- Chuck Briggs (1960–2000), American punk rock guitarist
- Clare Briggs (1875–1930), American comics artist
- Danny Briggs (born 1991), English cricketer
- Dave Briggs (journalist) (born 1976), American television news anchor
- David Briggs (disambiguation), multiple people
- Derek Briggs (born 1950), Irish paleontologist
- Devon Briggs (born 2004), New Zealand para-cyclist
- Everett Francis Briggs (1908–2006), American Catholic priest and miners' activist
- Francis Stewart Briggs (1897–1966), Australian aviator
- Frank Briggs (disambiguation), multiple people
- Gary Briggs (musician), British guitarist
- Gary Briggs (footballer) (born 1959), British footballer
- George N. Briggs (1796–1861), American politician
- Gilbert Briggs (1890–1978), English founder of Wharfedale loudspeakers
- Greg Briggs (born 1968), American football player
- Harlan Briggs (1879–1952), American actor
- Harry Briggs (disambiguation), multiple people
- Harold Briggs (RAF officer) (1877–1944), senior Royal Navy and Royal Air Force officer
- Harold Rawdon Briggs (1894–1952), director of operations for the British Army in Malaya 1950–1951
- Harold Briggs (politician) (1870–1945), British Conservative Member of Parliament
- Henry Briggs (disambiguation), multiple people
- Ian Briggs (born 1958), British television writer
- Jack Briggs (broadcaster), American radio broadcaster
- Jack Briggs (cricketer) (1916–1984), English cricketer
- Jack Briggs (actor) (1920–1998), husband of American actress Ginger Rogers
- Jack Briggs (policeman), head of Dubai police
- James Briggs (disambiguation), multiple people
- Jamie Briggs (born 1977), Australian politician
- Jason W. Briggs (1821–1899), American Latter Day Saint leader
- Jean Briggs (1929–2016), American-born Canadian anthropologist, ethnographer and linguist
- Jeff Briggs (born 1957), American composer and former computer games executive
- Jimmy Briggs (footballer) (1937–2011), Scottish footballer
- Jimmy Briggs (politician) (born 1868), Australian-born South African trade unionist and senator
- Joe Bob Briggs, pseudonym of John Irving Bloom (born 1953), American film critic and actor
- John Briggs (disambiguation), multiple people, also Jon, Johnny, and other variations
- Josephine Briggs, American nephrologist
- Jowon Briggs (born 2001), American football player
- Karen Briggs (musician) (born 1963), American violinist
- Karen Briggs (judoka) (born 1963), British judoka
- Katharine Cook Briggs (1875–1968), American co-inventor of the Myers-Briggs personality test
- Katharine Mary Briggs (1898–1980), British author
- Kenneth Briggs (born 1933), English cricketer and RAF officer
- Kerensa Briggs (born 1991), British composer
- Kevin "She'kspere" Briggs, American record producer
- Kim Briggs (handballer) (born 1977), Australian handball player and coach
- Lance Briggs (born 1980), American football player
- Lauren Briggs (born 1979), English squash player
- LeBaron Russell Briggs (1855–1934), American educator
- Leland Lawrence Briggs (1893–1975), American accounting scholar
- Louisa Briggs (1818 or 1836–1925), Aboriginal Australian rights activist, dormitory matron, midwife and nurse
- Louise Briggs (1870–1945), English teacher and Esperanto translator
- Lyman James Briggs (1874–1963), American physicist and civil servant
- Margaret Briggs, New Zealand legal scholar
- Margaret Jane Briggs (1892–1961), New Zealand show-ring rider
- Martin S. Briggs (1882–1977), British architectural historian
- Mary Blatchley Briggs (1846–1910), American writer and women's organizer
- Matt Briggs (born 1970), American writer
- Matthew Briggs (born 1991), English footballer
- Max Briggs (born 1948), English footballer
- Melancthon J. Briggs (1846–1923), American politician
- Michael Briggs (disambiguation), multiple people
- Mike Briggs (politician) (1959–2025), American politician
- Mike Briggs (tennis) (born 1968), American tennis player
- Miles Briggs (born 1983), British politician
- Nicholas Briggs (born 1961), British actor
- Nimi Briggs (1944–2023), Nigerian academic
- Patricia Briggs (born 1965), American fantasy writer
- Patrick Briggs (born 1940), English cricketer, rugby player and school headmaster
- Paul Briggs (American football) (1920–2011), American football tackle
- Paul Briggs (animator) (born 1974), American artist, animator, and voice actor
- Paul Briggs (boxer) (born 1975), Australian
- Perry R. Briggs (1825–1918), American politician in Wisconsin
- Peter Briggs (disambiguation), multiple people
- Raymond Briggs (1934–2022), English illustrator and author
- Raymond Briggs (British Army officer) (1895–1985), British Army major general
- Raymond Westcott Briggs (1878–1959), US Army officer brigadier general
- Robert Briggs (disambiguation), multiple people
- Shannon Briggs (born 1971), American boxer
- Stephen Briggs (born 1951), British Discworld adapter
- Stephen Foster Briggs (1885–1976), American engineer, co-founder of the Briggs & Stratton Company
- Ted Briggs (1923–2008), British seaman, survivor of the HMS Hood sinking
- Thomas Briggs (disambiguation), multiple people
- Tom Briggs (footballer) (1919–1999), English footballer
- Tom Briggs (gridiron football) (born 1970), American football player
- Tom Briggs (rugby league) (1919–1991), Australian rugby league player
- Tommy Briggs (1923–1984), English footballer
- Tony Briggs (born 1967), Aboriginal Australian actor, playwright, screenwriter, and producer
- Venetia Briggs-Gonzalez, Belizean research ecologist
- Vic Briggs (1945–2021), British blues and rock musician, lead guitarist of Eric Burdon and The Animals
- Walter Briggs Sr. (1877–1952), owner of the Detroit Tigers and Briggs Manufacturing Company
- Walter Briggs Jr. (1912–1970), son of Walter Briggs Sr. and owner of the Detroit Tigers
- William Briggs (disambiguation), multiple people

== Fictional characters ==
- Miss Briggs, character in American television series iCarly
- Bailey Briggs, Marvel Comics character also known as Spider-Boy
- Uncle Briggs (1949–1988), host of an American children's television series which aired on WSIL-TV
- Bobby Briggs, fictional character in American television series Twin Peaks
- Calico "Callie" Briggs, fictional character in SWAT Kats: The Radical Squadron
- Charlie Briggs (One Life to Live)
- Major Garland Briggs, fictional character in Twin Peaks
- Hortense Briggs, fictional character in An American Tragedy by Theodore Dreiser
- Jacqui Briggs, character in the arcade/videogame series Mortal Kombat
- Jackson "Jax" Briggs, character in the arcade/videogame series Mortal Kombat
- Jonny Briggs, main character of eponymous BBC children's drama 1985–1987
- Kim Briggs (Scrubs), mother of J.D.'s baby in American TV comedy-drama Scrubs
- Randolph Briggs, fictional character in the American television series Alice, played by Hans Conried.
- Sandra Briggs, fictional character in British soap opera Emmerdale

== See also ==
- Biggs (surname)
- Briggs (disambiguation), multiple people
- General Briggs (disambiguation), multiple people
- Governor Briggs (disambiguation), multiple people
- Senator Briggs (disambiguation), multiple people
