= Robert Briggs =

Robert Briggs may refer to:

- Bob Briggs (American football) (1945–1997), played in the American Football League and the National Football League
- Bob Briggs (Australian footballer) (1883–1955), Australian rules footballer
- Robert Briggs (American football) (born 1941), American football player
- Robert Briggs (character), fictitious Hollywood screenwriter
- Robert Briggs (MP) (died 1615), MP for Boroughbridge
- Robert Briggs (poet) (1929–2015), American poet
- Robert Briggs (publisher), American author and publisher, for Straight Arrow Press
- Robert Briggs (scientist) (1911–1983), cloning pioneer
- Robert H. Briggs (born 1949), American lawyer and historian
- Robert M. Briggs (1816–1886), Wisconsin legislator
- Robert O. Briggs (1927–2008), director of the University of California Marching Band
- Robert P. Briggs (1903–1998), American businessman

== See also ==
- Bob Briggs (chemist) (1905–1975), New Zealand organic chemist
