= Frank Briggs =

Frank or Francis Briggs is the name of:

== First and last name ==
- Frank Briggs (footballer) (1917–1984), an English footballer (soccer player)
- Frank Arlington Briggs (1858–1898), the fifth governor of North Dakota (U.S. state)
- Francis Arthur Briggs (1902–1983), a British barrister and colonial judge
- Frank Obadiah Briggs (1851–1913), a U.S. senator from New Jersey
- Frank Parks Briggs (1894–1992), a U.S. senator from Missouri
- Francis Stewart Briggs (1897–1966), an Australian aviator

== Middle and last name ==
- Everett Francis Briggs, MM (1908–2006), an American miners' activist and Catholic priest
- Henry Francis Briggs (1871–1913), an English footballer
- James "Jimmy" Dominic Francis Briggs (1868–?), an Australian-born South African politician and trade unionist
- Maxwell Francis Briggs (1948–), an English footballer
- Miles Edward Frank Briggs (1983–), a British politician of the Scottish Conservative Party

== First and middle name ==
- Francis Briggs Sowter (1852–1928), the Archdeacon of Dorset from 1889 to 1901

== See also ==
- Francine Briggs, played by Mindy Sterling in 2007–2012 American teen sitcom iCarly, an English teacher at Ridgeway Secondary School
