= General Briggs =

General Briggs may refer to:

- Charles James Briggs (1865–1941), British Army lieutenant general
- Harold Briggs (RAF officer) (1877–1944), Royal Air Force brigadier general
- Harold Rawdon Briggs (1894–1952), British Indian Army lieutenant general
- Henry Shaw Briggs (1824–1887), Union Army brigadier general
- James E. Briggs (1906–1979), U.S. Air Force lieutenant general
- John Briggs (East India Company officer) (1785–1875), British East India Company general
- Raymond Briggs (British Army officer) (1895–1985), British Army major general
- Raymond Westcott Briggs (1878–1959), U.S. Army officer brigadier general
