= Tom Briggs =

Tom Briggs may refer to:

- Tom Briggs (footballer) (1919–1999), English footballer
- Tom Briggs (gridiron football) (born 1970), American football player
- Tom Briggs (rugby league) (1919–1991), Australian rugby league player

== See also ==
- Tommy Briggs (1923–1984), English footballer
- Thomas Briggs (disambiguation)
