= Michael Briggs =

Michael or Mike Briggs may refer to:

- Michael Briggs (police officer) (1971–2006), American police officer in New Hampshire, murdered while on duty
- Michael Briggs (racing driver) (born 1966), South African racing driver
- Michael Briggs, Lord Briggs of Westbourne (born 1954), justice of the Supreme Court of the United Kingdom
- Michael Fenwick Briggs (1926–2017), British businessman
- Michael Harvey Briggs (1935–1986), English biochemist who was charged with research fabrication in the Briggs affair
- Mike Briggs (politician) (1959–2025), American politician
- Mike Briggs (tennis) (born 1968), American tennis player
- Peter Briggs (scientist) (Michael Peter Briggs, born 1944), British scientist and university administrator

== See also ==
- Briggs (surname)
