= 18th Division (United States) =

18th Infantry Division
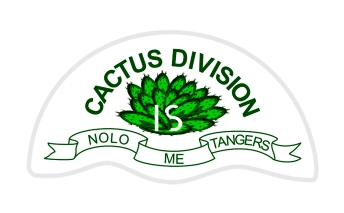
- Shoulder sleeve insignia of the 18th Division
- Active: July 1918–February 1919
- Country: United States
- Branch: United States Army
- Type: Infantry
- Size: Division
- Garrison/HQ: Camp Travis, Texas
- Nickname: Cactus Division
- Motto: Nolo me tangers

Commanders
- Notable commanders: Brigadier General George H. Estes; Brigadier General Frederick B. Shaw

There have been a number of 18th Divisions in the history of the United States Army:

== Pre-World War I ==
The first 18th Division was originally a National Guard division established in early 1917 consisting of troops from Arkansas, Louisiana, and Mississippi. By the end of that same year, the 18th Division had been redesignated the 39th Division (later the 39th Infantry Division).

In July 1918, a new 18th Division would be formed at Camp Beauregard, Louisiana. Training would begin when the division moved to Camp Doniphan at Fort Sill, Oklahoma.

On 27 August of 1918, troops of the 35th Infantry Brigade would be involved in a shootout known as the Battle of Ambos Nogales. Three soldiers from the brigade were killed in the one day incident.

== World War I ==
- 18th Division (World War I): Organized in 1918 as a regular army and national army division for World War I, the 18th Division did not go overseas and demobilized in February 1919 at Camp Travis, Texas. The division included the 35th Infantry Brigade and the 36th Infantry Brigade and the 18th Artillery Brigade.

== Organization ==
- 35th Infantry Brigade (Camp Travis, Texas)
  - 19th Infantry Regiment (Fort Sam Houston, Texas)
  - 85th Infantry Regiment (Camp Travis, Texas)
  - 53rd Machine Gun Battalion (Camp Travis, Texas)
- 36th Infantry Brigade (Camp Travis, Texas)
  - 35th Infantry Regiment (Nogales, Arizona)
  - 86th Infantry Regiment (Camp Travis, Texas)
  - 54th Machine Gun Battalion (Camp Travis, Texas)
- 18th Field Artillery Brigade (Camp Travis, Texas)
  - 53rd Field Artillery Regiment (Camp Stanley, Texas)
  - 54th Field Artillery Regiment (Camp Stanley, Texas)
  - 184th Trench Mortar Battalion (Camp Stanley, Texas)
- Division Headquarters
  - 52nd Machine Gun Battalion (Camp Travis, Texas)
  - 218th Engineers (Camp Humphreys, Virginia)
  - 218th Signal Battalion
- Division Supply Trains
  - 18th Military Police
  - 18th Ammunition Train
  - 18th Supply Train (Camp Travis, Texas)
  - 18th Sanitary Train (Camp Travis, Texas)

== Division commanders ==
- Colonel James H. Frier (interim) August 21, 1918-September 15, 1918
- Brigadier General George H. Estes September 16, 1918-October 14, 1918
- Colonel James H. Frier (interim), October 14, 1918-October 23, 1918
- Brigadier General Frederick B. Shaw, October 24, 1919-October 26, 1918
- Brigadier General George H. Estes, October 27, 1919-February 14, 1919.

== Brigade commanders ==
=== Commander, 35th Infantry Brigade ===
- Colonel Robert C. Williams (interim), August 25, 1918-September 16, 1918
- Brigadier George H. Estes, September 16, 1918-October 13, 1918
- Colonel Josephus S. Cecil, October 14, 1918-October 26, 1918
- Brigadier General George H. Estes, October 27, 1918-February 14, 1919.

=== Commander, 36th Infantry Brigade ===
- Colonel James H. Frier (interim), August 21, 1918-October 23, 1918
- Brigadier General Frederick B. Shaw (October 24, 1918-February 6, 1919
- Colonel James H. Frier, February 7, 1919-February 14, 1919.

=== Commander, 18th Field Artillery Brigade ===
- Colonel Thomas E. Merrill (interim) August 21 1918-October 26, 1918
- Brigadier General Raymond W. Briggs October 26, 1918-November 10, 1918
- Colonel Thomas E. Merrill (interim) November 10, 1918-November 19, 1918
- Brigadier General Raymond W. Briggs November 19, 1918-December 18, 1918
- Lt. Colonel Charles S. Haight (interim) December 18, 1918-December 22, 1918
- Colonel Samuel McP. Rutherford (interim) December 22, 1918-January 4, 1919
- Brigadier General Raymond W. Briggs January 4, 1919-February 14, 1919

== World War II ==
- 18th Armored Division: Placed on rolls for World War II, the 18th Armored Division was never organized.
- 18th Airborne Division: a "phantom" division in World War II.
