= Bill Briggs =

Bill Briggs may refer to:

- Bill Briggs (skier) (born 1931), American extreme skier and director of the Great American Ski School, Jackson, Wyoming
- Bill Briggs (defensive end) (born 1943), former American football defensive end
- Bill Briggs (American football coach) (born 1953/4), American football coach in the United States
- Bill Briggs (Canadian football) (1925–2000), Canadian football player

== See also ==
- Billy Briggs (born 1977), American musician and songwriter
- William Briggs (disambiguation)
