= Jack Briggs =

Jack Briggs may refer to:

- Jack Briggs (broadcaster), American radio broadcaster
- Jack Briggs (cricketer) (1916–1984), English cricketer
- Jack Briggs (actor) (1920–1998), American actor, husband of Ginger Rogers
- Jack Briggs (policeman), soldier, Arabist and police officer who served as Dubai's chief of police
