= Royal Air Force College Cranwell =

Military academy in Lincolnshire, England

Coordinates: 53.0368°N 0.5105°W

The Royal Air Force College
- Coat of arms
- Former name: RAF (Cadet) College
- Motto: Superna Petimus
- Motto in English: We seek higher things
- Type: Military academy
- Established: 1 November 1919; 107 years ago
- Parent institution: No. 22 Group
- Affiliations: Royal Air Force
- Commandant: Air Commodore M D Lorriman-Hughes
- Location: Cranwell, Lincolnshire, United Kingdom
- March: The Lincolnshire Poacher
- Website: www.raf.mod.uk/our-organisation/stations/raf-cranwell/

The Royal Air Force College is based at RAF Cranwell, and consists of the RAF Officer Training Academy (RAFOTA), Aviator Training Academy (RAF AvTA), Tedder Academy of Leadership, Robson Academy of Resilience and No. 6 Flying Training School (6FTS). Established in 1919, the RAF College holds the distinction of being the world's first air academy, and its motto, Superna Petimus ('We seek higher things') reflects its commitment to excellence and innovation in air power.

== History ==
=== Early years ===
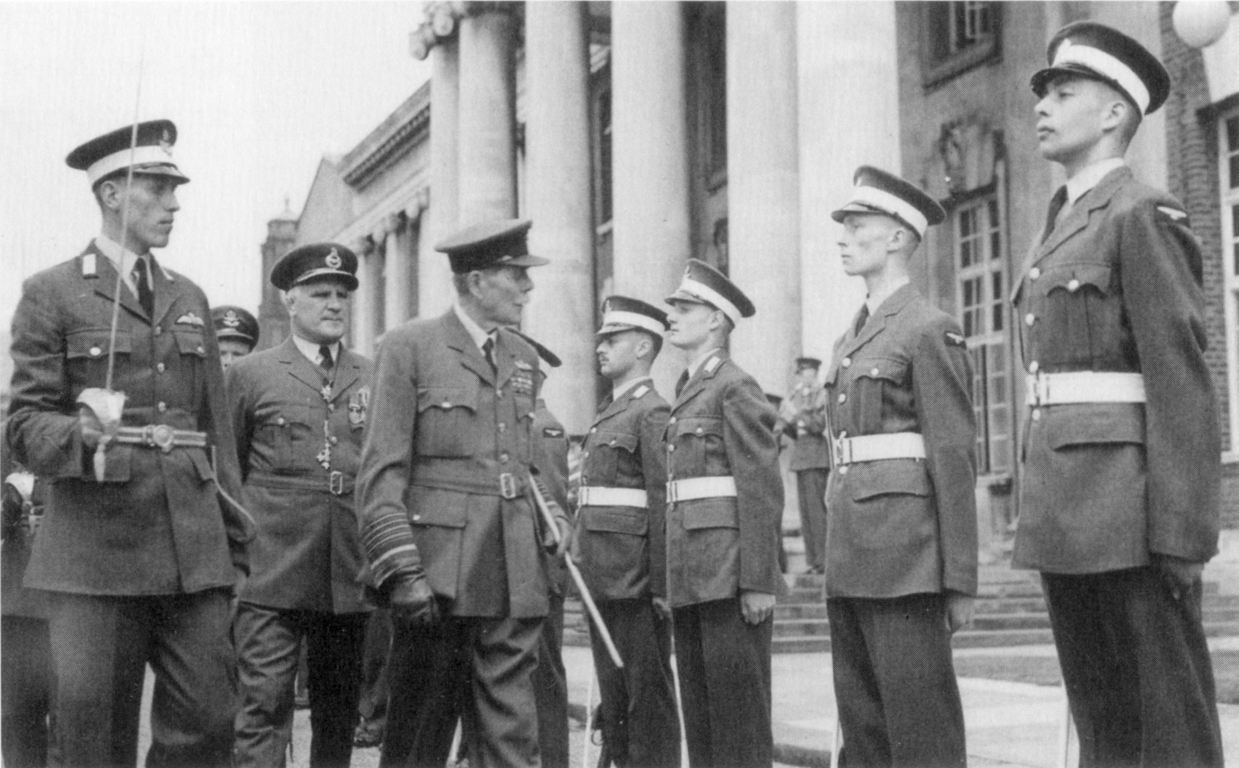
The Lord Trenchard inspecting cadets

In December 1915, after the Royal Naval Air Service had broken away from the Royal Flying Corps, Commodore Godfrey Paine was sent to Cranwell to start a naval flying training school in order that the Royal Navy would no longer need to make use of the Central Flying School. The Royal Naval Air Service Training Establishment, Cranwell opened on 1 April 1916 at Cranwell under Paine's leadership.

In 1917 Paine was succeeded by Commodore John Luce and in 1918 following the foundation of the Royal Air Force in April, Brigadier-General Harold Briggs took over. As the naval personnel were held on the books of HMS Daedalus, a hulk that was moored on the River Medway, this gave rise to a misconception that Cranwell was first established as HMS Daedalus.

The Royal Air Force was formed on 1 April 1918 and, as a Royal Air Force establishment, Cranwell became the headquarters of No. 12 Group for the last few months of the war. After the cessation of hostilities in November 1918, the Chief of the Air Staff, Sir Hugh Trenchard, was determined to maintain the Royal Air Force as an independent service rather than let the Army and Navy control air operations again. The establishment of an air academy, which would provide basic flying training, provide intellectual education and give a sense of purpose to the future leaders of the service was therefore a priority. Trenchard chose Cranwell as the College's location because, as he told his biographer:

"Marooned in the wilderness, cut off from pastimes they could not organise for themselves, the cadets would find life cheaper, healthier and more wholesome."

The Royal Air Force College was formed on 1 November 1919 as the RAF (Cadet) College under the authority of its first commandant Air Commodore Charles Longcroft. Prior to this, RAF cadets had been trained by the RAF Cadet Brigade based at Hastings under the command of Brigadier-General Alfred Critchley.

On 20 June 1929, an aeroplane piloted by Flight Cadet C. J. Giles crashed on landing at the College and burst into flames. A fellow flight cadet, William McKechnie, pulled Giles, who was incapable of moving himself, from the burning wreckage. McKechnie was awarded the Empire Gallantry Medal for his actions.

The Royal Air Force tended to recruit its officers from the public schools and just 14 per cent of officer cadets at Cranwell between 1934 and 1939 came from grammar or state schools.

=== The building of College Hall ===
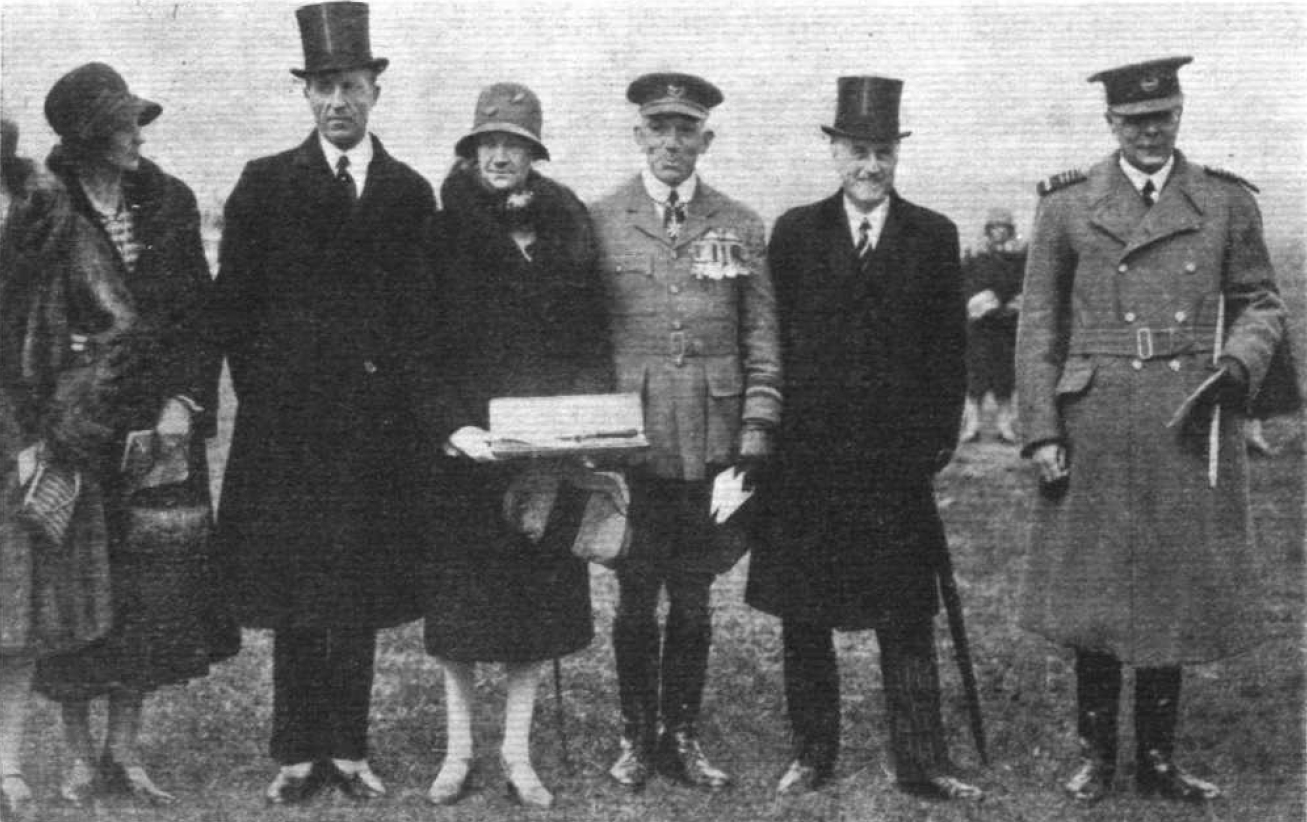
The dignitaries present for the founding ceremony for the new College Hall building in 1929.

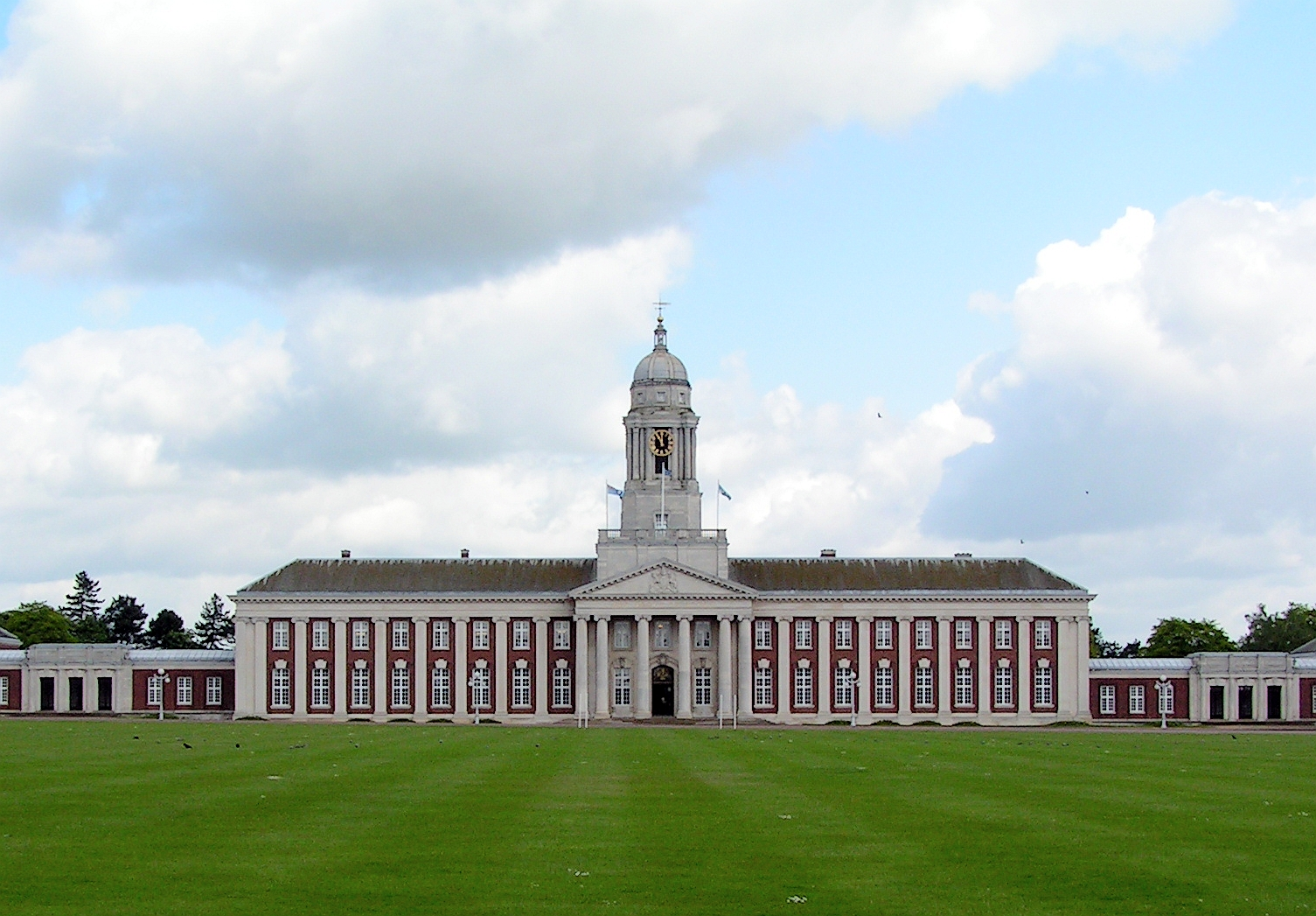
College hall

Prior to the construction of the neo-classical College Hall, training took place in old naval huts. In the 1920s Sir Samuel Hoare battled for a substantial College building. Architect's plans were drawn up in 1929 for the present-day College. After some disagreement between Hoare and architect James West, the building plans incorporated design aspects of Christopher Wren's Royal Hospital at Chelsea. Lady Maud Hoare laid the foundation stone in 1929.

In September 1933 the building was completed; it was built of rustic and moulded brick. Its frontage was 800 feet (240 m). In front of the Hall, orange gravel paths lead around a roughly circular grass area ("The Orange") toward the parade ground. The building, which has Grade II listed status, became the main location for RAF officer training when the Prince of Wales officially opened it in October 1934.

In 1936 the College was reduced from command to group status within Training Command and the commandant ceased to hold the title of Air Officer Commanding RAF Cranwell.

Just before the outbreak of the Second World War, the Air Ministry closed the College as an initial officer training establishment. With the need to train aircrew in large numbers it was redesignated the RAF College Flying Training School and it did not return to its former function until 1947. It was also in 1947 that the Equipment and Secretarial Branch cadets were admitted to the College alongside the traditional flight cadets.

=== Post war ===
The postwar restoration of the College was a period of change and uncertainty. Recruiting often failed to find enough qualified candidates to fill each entry (50 pilots, two or three times a year, with 10 to 20 navigator and non-flying officers as well.) The pilot washout rate approached 50 per cent, so RAF authorities debated whether flying training to professional levels (pilot wings standard) should be separated from a (shorter) officer training course. Cranwell cadets were in 1950 equipped and treated as airmen, i.e. had to clean their own quarters and uniforms impeccably, while undergoing both flying training and college-level courses in engineering. By 1960 they lived and were dressed as officers, served by batmen. In the same period the 1957 Defence White Paper suggested the RAF would replace human pilots by guided missiles, at least for home defence of the UK. These vicissitudes are documented in Haslam's narrative and the personal memoir of a New Zealand cadet who attended the college from 1951 to 1953.

In 1952 a College Memorial Chapel was established within College Hall. Ten years later it was relocated to the then new College Church, St Michael and All Angels, which is situated nearby to the south-east of College Hall.

Cranwell became the entry point for all those who wished to become permanent officers in the RAF. Initially the course took two years, but by the 1950s this had expanded to three. Basic training was provided on Percival Provosts. However, with the arrival of No. 81 Entry in September 1959, the college gave students the option of taking a degree and allowed them to fly Jet Provosts.

A new academic building, now known as Whittle Hall, was built to support the expanded syllabus. It was opened in 1962 by Sir Frank Whittle, who had attended Cranwell as a young officer and had subsequently invented the turbojet engine.

In 1966 the Royal Air Force Technical College at RAF Henlow, a similar cadet college for engineering officers, was merged with the College at Cranwell.

== Current training and organisation ==
The College is the RAF equivalent of the Royal Navy's Britannia Royal Naval College and the British Army's Royal Military Academy Sandhurst. At present, most RAF officer cadets complete the 24-week Modular Initial Officer Training Course within the RAF Officer Training Academy (RAFOTA), Cranwell intakes usually take place at six week intervals throughout the year.

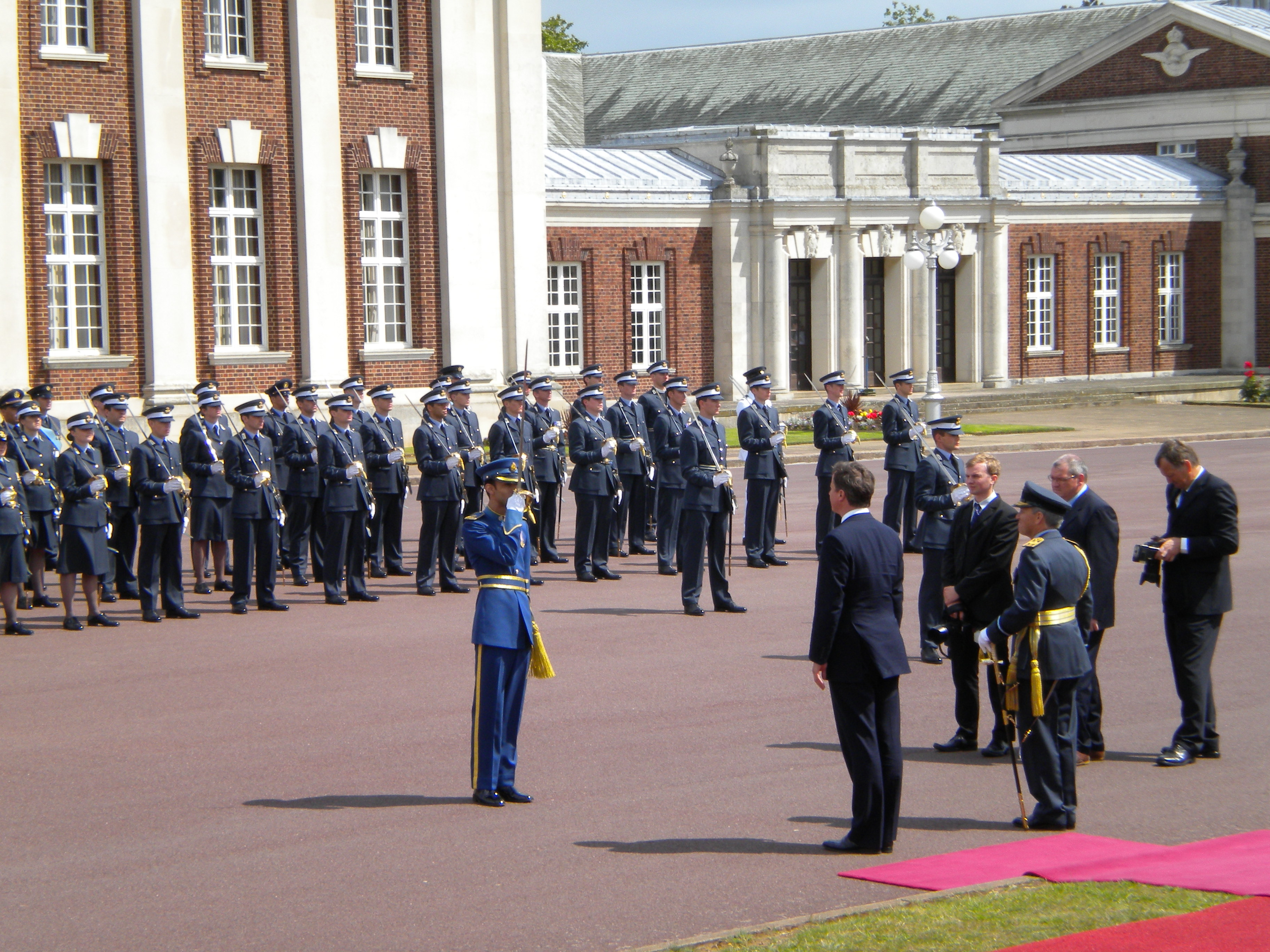
Omani officer cadet saluting British Prime Minister David Cameron.

In addition to the many British officer cadets who have passed through Cranwell, graduating cadets have come from many countries around the world, including Bahrain, Iraq, Oman, Qatar, Pakistan, Sri Lanka, Trinidad and Tobago and Paraguay. RAFOTA also provides Specialist Officer Initial Training (SOIT) courses for medical and dental officers, chaplains, legal officers and nursing officers, and for officers rejoining the Service or transferring from the sister services. A small number of short induction courses cater for warrant officers selected for commissioning, university cadets, bursars and Volunteer Reserve officers. In addition, RAFOTA delivers a 2-week Reserve Officer Initial Training course for Full Time Reservists, Royal Auxiliary Air Force (RAuxAF), Mobile Meteorological Unit and Reserve Officers. The College awards the Sword of Honour to the most outstanding student officer of the year.

In 2019 RAF Cranwell's structure was as follows;

- No.3 Flying Training School
  - No. 45 Squadron RAF
  - No. LVII Squadron RAF
  - 703 Naval Air Squadron
  - No. 674 Squadron AAC
- No.6 Flying Training School
  - Universities Air Squadron
- RAF Officer Training Academy
- Recruiting and Selection Team
- Central Flying School
- Headquarters, Air Cadets
- RAF Disclosures
- Band of the RAF College (see below)
- RAuxAF Band
- Air Warfare School
  - Lodger Unit

== Band of the Royal Air Force College ==
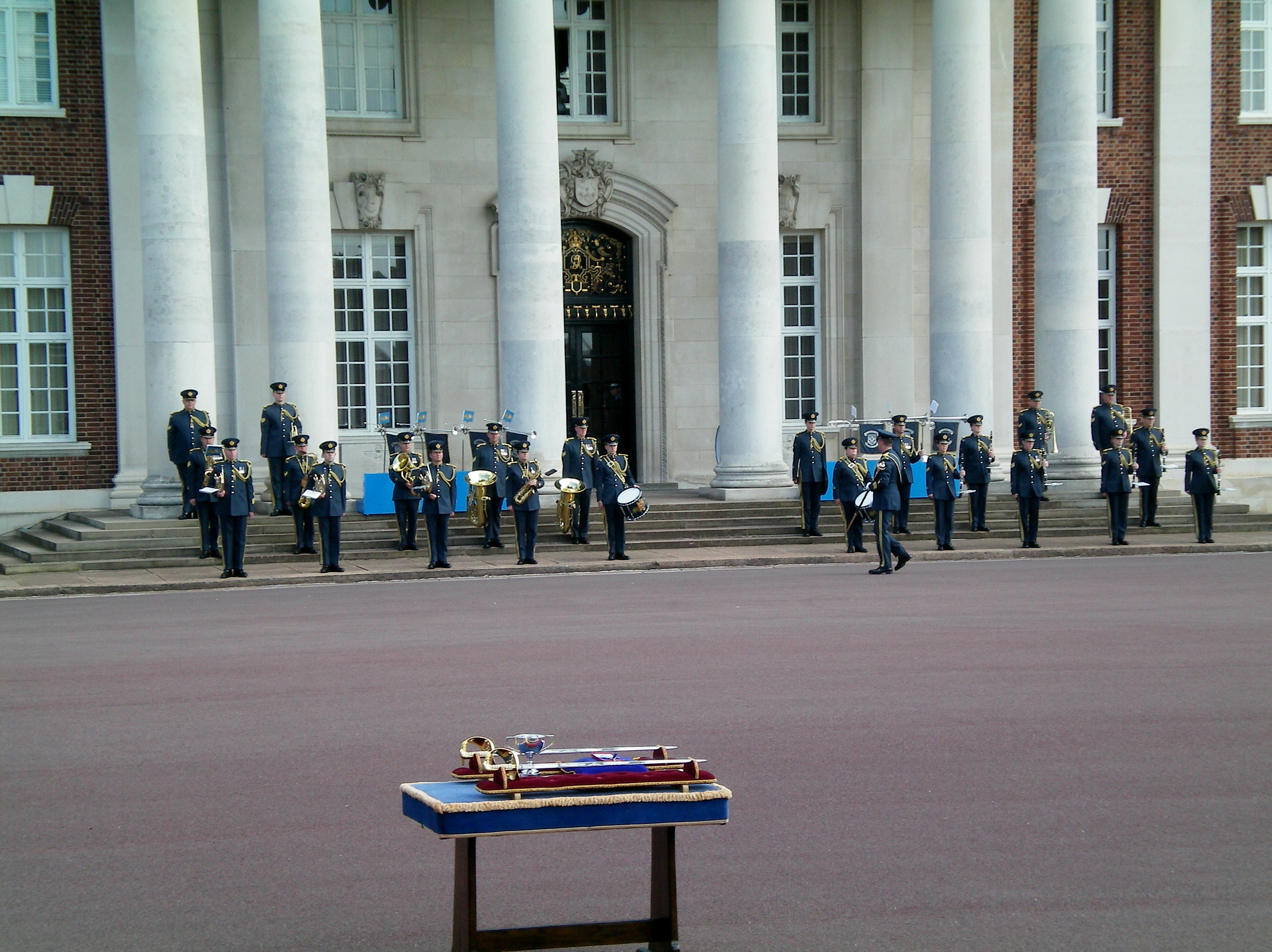
The band prepares for a graduation parade at College Hall

Based at RAF Cranwell, the Band of the Royal Air Force College is one of three established Bands in the RAF. Originally formed to support the Royal Air Force College, the band is now administered by RAF Music Services. In addition to its duties at Cranwell, the Band takes part in major events such as the Changing of the Guard at Buckingham Palace and the Edinburgh Tattoo as well as a busy schedule of services and charity engagements.

== Commandants ==
The Commandant is the air officer in charge of the College. Under the present organisation of the RAF, the Commandant reports to Air Officer Commanding No. 22 Group who has Service-wide responsibility for training. From 1920 to 1936 the College Commandant was double-hatted as the Air Officer Commanding RAF Cranwell.

- 1 November 1919 Air Commodore C. A. H. Longcroft (5 February 1920 appointed AOC RAF Cranwell)
- 15 August 1923 Air Commodore A. E. Borton
- 1 November 1926 Air Vice-Marshal F. C. Halahan
- 16 December 1929 Air Vice-Marshal A. M. Longmore
- 30 January 1933 Air Vice-Marshal W. G. S. Mitchell
- 3 December 1934 Air Vice-Marshal H. M. Cave-Browne-Cave
- 21 December 1936 Air Vice-Marshal J. E. A. Baldwin
- 15 August 1939 Air Commodore D. Harries
- Dates unknown Air Commodore R. Halley (the reference raises significant doubt about this appointment)
- July 1944 Air Commodore W. E. G. Bryant (died while holding the post of Commandant)
- September 1945 Air Commodore R. L. R. Atcherley
- 1 January 1949 Air Commodore G. R. Beamish
- 31 July 1950 Air Commodore L. F. Sinclair
- 25 August 1952 Air Commodore H. Eeles
- 16 April 1956 Air Commodore T. A. B. Parselle
- 26 August 1958 Air Commodore D. F. Spotswood
- 16 April 1961 Air Commodore E. D. McK. Nelson
- 21 August 1963 Air Commodore M. D. Lyne
- 28 December 1964 Air Commodore, later Air Vice-Marshal I. D. N. Lawson
- 1 February 1967 Air Vice-Marshal T. N. Stack
- 9 March 1970 Air Vice-Marshal F. D. Hughes
- 23 September 1972 Air Vice-Marshal R. D. Austen-Smith
- 9 July 1975 Air Vice-Marshal W. E. Colahan
- 28 January 1978 Air Vice-Marshal D. Harcourt-Smith
- 9 January 1980 Air Vice-Marshal B. Brownlow
- 31 January 1982 Air Vice-Marshal R. C. F. Peirse
- 18 January 1985 Air Vice-Marshal E. H. Macey
- 17 July 1987 Air Vice-Marshal R. H. Wood
- 8 December 1989 Air Vice-Marshal R. M. Austin
- 21 February 1992 Air Vice-Marshal D. Cousins
- 7 October 1994 Air Vice-Marshal A. J. Stables
- 22 January 1997 Air Vice-Marshal J. H. Thompson
- 30 July 1998 Air Vice-Marshal T. W. Rimmer
- 21 July 2000 Air Vice-Marshal H. G. Mackay
- 27 June 2002 Air Vice-Marshal A. J. Smith
- 3 December 2002 Air Commodore M. C. Barter
- 24 November 2005 Air Commodore R. B. Cunningham
- 4 April 2008 Air Commodore A. D. Stevenson
- 3 June 2010 Air Commodore P. N. Oborn CBE
- March 2012 Air Commodore D. Stubbs
- December 2013 Air Commodore C. J. Luck
- 22 August 2016 Air Commodore P. J. M. Squires
- 10 December 2019 Air Commodore S. A. Marshall
- 6 October 2021 Air Commodore A. Dickens OBE
- 17 July 2024 Air Commodore J. Lyle
- 4 Apr 2026 Air Commodore M D Lorriman-Hughes

== Notable alumni ==
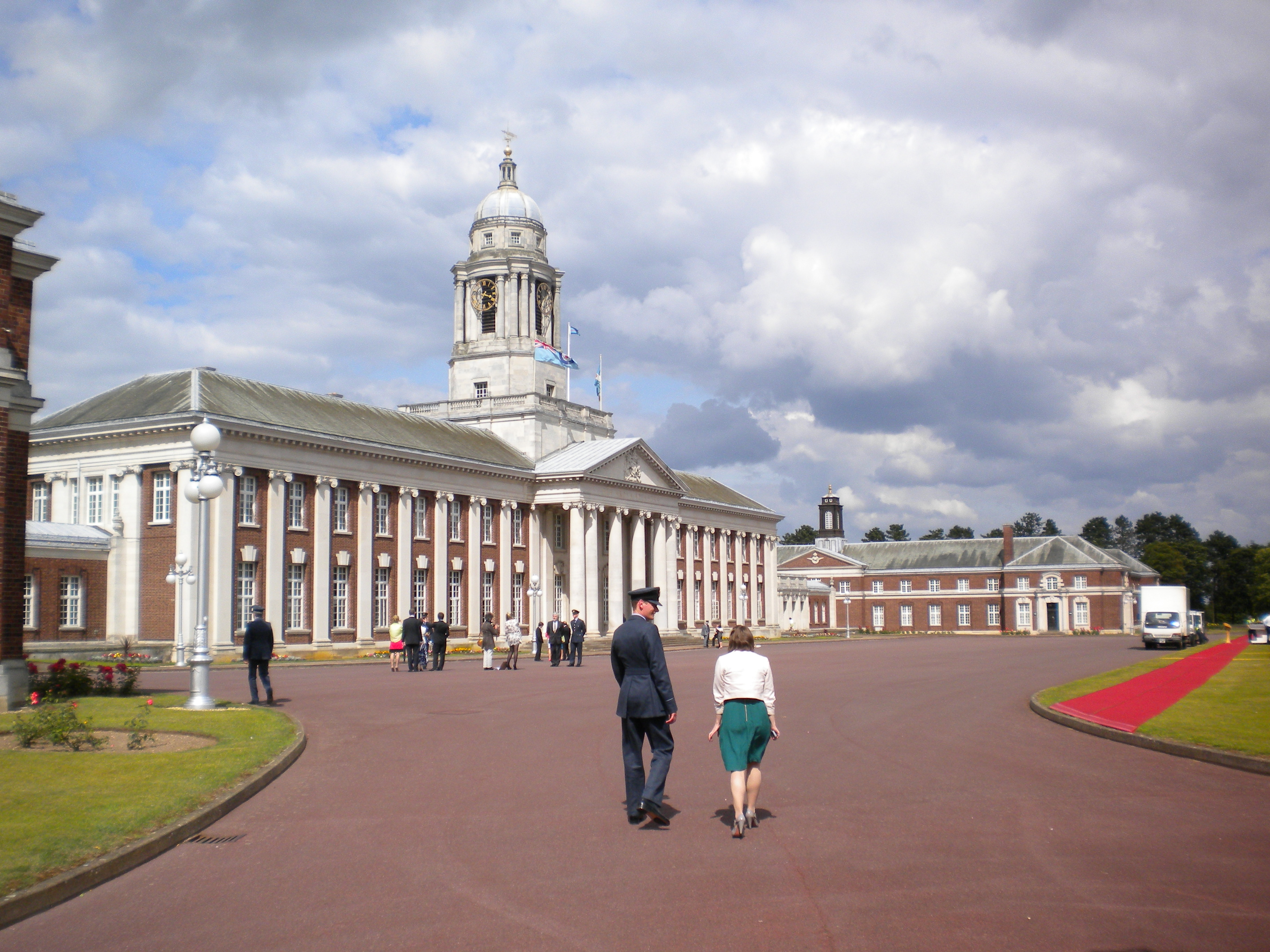
Graduated officers and families in the afternoon after a passing out parade

Cranwell has had many famous graduates. As there have been many notable RAF officers who were commissioned from Cranwell, a fair and representative list would be impractical. Therefore, only those who are notable in other ways are listed below:

=== Royalty ===
- Prince Bandar bin Sultan
- Prince Muqrin bin Abdulaziz Al Saud
- Prince Faisal bin Al Hussein
- King Charles III (underwent training as a jet pilot at Cranwell, but did his officer training at The Royal Naval College, Dartmouth)
- Prince William (gained his RAF wings on 11 April 2008, but did not complete officer training at Cranwell, rather with the Army at Sandhurst)
- Prince Muhammad bin Saad
- Prince Edward (called operation Goshawk, he was given flying training at Barkston Heath)

=== Politicians ===
- Lord Malcolm Douglas-Hamilton
- Sir Rolf Dudley-Williams, 1st Baronet

=== Other ===
- Sir Frank Whittle, joint father of jet propulsion; his ashes are interred at Cranwell
- Air Chief Marshal The Earl of Bandon, who inherited his title while a cadet at Cranwell and whose portrait hangs in the dining room of College Hall
- Marshal of the Air Force Arjan Singh, Chief of the Air Staff (India)
- Rory Underwood, rugby union footballer
- Sir Douglas Bader, flying ace. Captained RAFC Cranwell's rugby union team
- Wing Commander Clive Beadon, bomber pilot in World War II
- Air Vice Marshal Subroto Mukerjee, Chief of the Air Staff (India)
- Kenneth Briggs, first-class cricketer
- Mohammad Sharif Ibrahim, commander of the Royal Brunei Air Force from 2020 to 2025

== Arms ==
Coat of arms of Royal Air Force College Cranwell
Adopted December 1929, May 1972 (supporters) Crest On a wreath of the colours a figure representing Daedalus proper. Escutcheon Azure on a Chevron between three Cranes Volant all Argent as many torteaux each charged with a Lion's face Or. Supporters On either side an Eagle wings addorsed and inverted Argent beaked and legged Gules langued and armed Azure gorged with an Astral Crown Or charged with a Fleur-de-Lys Or the dexter fimbriated Vert the sinister fimbriated Gules. Motto SUPERNA PETIMUS
