= Charles Briggs =

Charles Briggs may refer to:

- Charles Ackerly Briggs (1926–2015), CIA officer
- Charles Augustus Briggs (1841–1913), American Hebrew scholar and theologian
- Charles Frederick Briggs (1804–1877), American journalist who wrote under the name "Harry Franco"
- Charles Briggs (British Army officer) (1865–1941), British major-general
- Charles L. Briggs (born 1953), American anthropologist
- Chuck Briggs (1960–2000), American punk rock guitarist
- Charles Briggs (cricketer) (1873–1949), Hampshire cricketer
- Charles Briggs (Royal Navy officer) (1858–1951), British admiral
- Charlie Briggs (actor) (1932–1985), American actor
- Charlie Briggs (baseball) (1860–1920), American baseball player
- Charlie Briggs (footballer) (1911–1993), English football goalkeeper
- Charlie Briggs (One Life to Live), fictional character

== See also ==
- Briggs (surname)
