= Peter Briggs =

Peter Briggs may refer to:

- Peter Briggs (screenwriter) (born 1965), English cinematographer and screenwriter
- Peter Briggs (badminton) (born 1992), English badminton player
- Peter Briggs (scientist) (born 1944), British scientist and university administrator
- Peter Briggs (squash player), American college squash coach and player
- Pete Briggs, American jazz bass and tuba player
