= William Briggs =

William Briggs may refer to:

- William Briggs (physician) (1642–1704), English physician and oculist
- William Edward Briggs (1847–1903), English cotton manufacturer and Liberal politician
- William Briggs (1845–1922), English embroidery manufacturer
- Sir William Edward Briggs Priestley (1859–1932), Liberal politician
- William B. Briggs (born 1954), subject matter expert in sports and entertainment law
- William Briggs (publisher) (1836–1922), Irish-born Canadian Methodist minister and publisher
- William Perry Briggs (1856–1928), English medical officer of health
- Harold Briggs (politician) (William James Harold Briggs, 1870–1945), British Conservative Party politician
- Ronnie Briggs (William Ronald Briggs, 1943–2008), Northern Irish footballer
- Billy Briggs (born 1977), musician and songwriter
- William Briggs, a Canadian book publishing imprint later known as Ryerson Press

== See also ==
- Bill Briggs (disambiguation)
- William Briggs Homestead, historic farmhouse, Auburn, Maine
