= Ape and Essence =

1948 novel by Aldous Huxley

- First edition (US)
- Author: Aldous Huxley
- Language: English
- Genre: Science fiction, satire
- Publisher: Harper & Brothers (US); Chatto & Windus (UK)
- Publication date: August 1948 (US); 1949 (UK)
- Publication place: United States
- Media type: Print (hardcover and paperback)
- Pages: 152
- OCLC: 248417

Ape and Essence (1948) is a novel by Aldous Huxley, first published in August 1948 by Harper & Brothers in the US, and then in 1949 by Chatto & Windus in the UK. It is set in a dystopia, as is Brave New World, Huxley's more famous work. It is largely a satire of the rise of large-scale warfare and warmongering in the 20th century, and presents a pessimistic view of the politics of mutually assured destruction. The book makes extensive use of surreal imagery, depicting humans as apes who, as a whole, will inevitably kill themselves.

== Structure ==
The novel is divided into two sections, "Tallis"—the name of the novel's character most like Huxley himself—and "the Script"—the screenplay titled Ape and Essence which Tallis had submitted to the studio (it was rejected on 26 November 1947, a fortnight before his death, but not returned to him).

=== Frame ===
An etching by Goya described in Tallis

"Tallis" introduces two movie industry intellectuals—screenwriter Bob Briggs and the narrator—who, on the day of Gandhi's murder (30 January 1948), rescue Ape and Essence from the trash. Intrigued, they make the drive two days later to Los Angeles County's high desert to find its author, William Tallis. En route they discuss a range of ideas cultural and topical, from Gandhi to Goya.

They arrive at a remote and isolated old ranch, a solitary homestead in a surreal setting. They interact with the home's inhabitants, learning that Tallis died suddenly just six weeks before. As these characters serve mainly to establish the narrative frame, or context, they are not seen again, except insofar as Tallis has written himself into the script's final scene, foreknowing his death (but misimagining his grave to lie at the desert farm he rents, rather than in a proper cemetery 30 miles (50 km) away in Lancaster).

=== Story ===
Ape and Essence is presented in its entirety, without remark by interruption, footnote or afterword. It begins with a vignette describing the destruction of the world by nuclear and chemical warfare at the hands of intelligent baboons. The two warring sides each have an Einstein on a leash which they force to press the button, releasing clouds of disease-causing gases toward each other.

The story then advances to a time 100 years after the catastrophic events of World War III, which characters in the book refer to as "the Thing", when nuclear and chemical weapons eventually destroyed most of human civilisation. In the script's timeframe, radiation has subsided to safer levels and in 2107, an exploratory team of New Zealand rediscovery scientists (New Zealand was spared from direct nuclear attack because it was "of no strategic importance") travel to California.

Meanwhile, a strange society has emerged from the radiation and three of its men capture one of the scientists (Dr. Poole). Dr. Poole is introduced to an illiterate society which survives by "mining" graves for clothes, burning library books as fuel, and killing off newborns deformed by radiation (that is, newborns with over three pairs of nipples and more than seven toes or fingers) to preserve genetic purity. The society has also taken to worshipping Satan, whom they refer to as "Belial", and limiting reproduction to an annual two-week orgy which begins on "Belial's Day Eve" after the deformed babies are "purified by blood".

The story climaxes during the purification ceremonies of Belial's Day Eve with an intellectual confrontation between Dr. Poole and the arch-vicar, the head of the Church of Belial. During the conversation the arch-vicar reveals that there is a minority of "hots" who do not express an interest in the post-World War III style of reproduction, but they are severely punished to keep them in line. In exchange for his life, Dr. Poole agrees to do what he can as a botanist to help increase their crops yields, but about a year later he escapes with Loola in search of the community of "hots" that is rumoured to exist north of the desert.

The script—and the novel—end with Dr. Poole and Loola in the desert north of Los Angeles, breaking their trek by a tombstone which bears the author's name of Tallis, the dates 1882–1948, and three lines from the antepenultimate verse of Percy Bysshe Shelley's elegy on the death of John Keats. Lest Loola find it sad, Dr. Poole, happily possessed of a duodecimo Shelley, reads her the poem's penultimate verse:

That Light whose smile kindles the Universe
That Beauty in which all things work and move
That Benediction, which the eclipsing Curse
Of birth can quench not, that sustaining Love,
Which through the web of being blindly wove
By man and beast and earth and air and sea,
Burns bright or dim, as each are mirrors of
The fire for which all thirst, now beams on me
Consuming the last clouds of cold mortality.

=== Vignettes ===
The story in the script is punctuated by a series of vignettes centering on a society which is much like 20th century human society, but with baboons substituted for men. The opening scene shows two Einsteins, tied to leashes held by baboons on either side of a pair of baboon armies, facing each other and preparing for battle. They are then directed to operate machines which release "improved" disease-causing clouds at the opposition.

Several of the vignettes portray a female baboon singing sensually to an all-baboon audience "Give me, give me, give me detumescence..." Other vignettes involve apes performing various human activities, ape armies assembling, and other more surreal imagery.

== Commentary on the idea of "progress" ==
In the words of the Arch-Vicar of Belial:

Progress and Nationalism—those were the two great ideas He [Belial] put into their heads. Progress—the theory that you can get something for nothing; the theory that you can gain in one field without paying for your gain in another; the theory that you alone understand the meaning of history; the theory that you know what’s going to happen fifty years from now; the theory that, in the teeth of all experience, you can foresee all the consequences of your present actions; the theory that Utopia lies just ahead and that, since ideal ends justify the most abominable means, it is your privilege and duty to rob, swindle, torture, enslave and murder all those who, in your opinion (which is, by definition, infallible), obstruct the onward march to the earthly paradise. Remember that phrase of Karl Marx’s: ‘Force is the midwife of Progress.’ He might have added—but of course Belial didn’t want to let the cat out of the bag at that early stage of the proceedings—that Progress is the midwife of Force. Doubly the midwife, for the fact of technological progress provides people with the instruments of ever more indiscriminate destruction, while the myth of political and moral progress serves as the excuse for using those means to the very limit. I tell you, my dear sir, an undevout historian is mad. The longer you study modern history, the more evidence you find of Belial’s Guiding Hand.
