= John Luce (Royal Navy officer) =

Royal Navy officer (1870–1932)

Admiral John Luce CB
- Luce in 1918
- Born: 4 February 1870; Halcombe, Malmesbury, England
- Died: 22 September 1932 (aged 62); Little Cheverell, Wiltshire, England
- Spouse: Mary Dorothea Tucker
- Relatives: Admiral Sir David Luce (son); Sir William Luce (son); Sir Richard Luce (brother)
- Military career
- Allegiance: United Kingdom
- Branch: Royal Navy
- Service years: 1883–1924
- Rank: Admiral
- Commands: Flag Officer, Malta (1921–1924); HMS Ramillies (1919–1920); Central Depot and Training Establishment (1917–1918); HMS Glasgow (1912–1916); HMS Hibernia (1910–1912)
- Conflicts: First World War
- Awards: Companion of the Order of the Bath
- Other work: High Sheriff of Wiltshire

Admiral John Luce, CB (4 February 1870 – 22 September 1932) was a Royal Navy officer who served in World War I. He played a significant role in the early development of British naval aviation and held command during the Battle of Coronel and the Battle of the Falkland Islands in the South Atlantic.

== Early and family life ==
John Luce was born on 4 February 1870 at Halcombe, Malmesbury, in the English county of Wiltshire. In 1902, he married Mary Dorothea Tucker; and they had three children:

- The eldest, Alfred, born on 6 November 1903, also joined the Navy and was executive officer of HMS Norfolk during the pursuit of the German battleship Bismarck. He died in a training exercise on 20 October 1941. Alfred had two daughters.
- Sir David Luce, born on 23 January 1906, joined the Navy and served as First Sea Lord from 1963 to 1966.
- Sir William Luce was born the following year and in later life became the Governor of Aden from 1956 to 1960.

His great-granddaughter is comedian and actress Miranda Hart.

== Naval career ==
Luce joined the Royal Navy as a naval cadet in January 1883. He was promoted to lieutenant on 1 January 1892. From 25 January 1900 he was in command of the training brig HMS Dolphin, based at Portsmouth. He was with this ship when she took part in the fleet review held at Spithead on 16 August 1902 for the coronation of King Edward VII.

In June 1909, Luce was promoted to captain and from October 1910 to January 1912 he was the captain of the battleship HMS Hibernia.

In September 1912, Luce took command of HMS Glasgow, a light cruiser. and was still in command at the start of the First World War. In November 1914, he took part in the Battle of Coronel in the South Atlantic. During the battle, Glasgow together with the cruisers HMS Good Hope and HMS Monmouth engaged the German East Asia Cruiser Squadron, including the new cruisers SMS Scharnhorst and SMS Gneisenau. The German light cruisers had only 4.1 in (100 mm) guns, which had left Glasgow relatively unscathed, but these were now joined by the 8.2-inch guns of Gneisenau. Luce determined that nothing was to be gained by staying and attempting to fight. It was noticed that each time he fired, the flash of his guns was used by the Germans to aim a new salvo, so he also ceased firing. One compartment of the ship was flooded, but she could still manage 24 kn (28 mph; 44 km/h). He returned first to Monmouth, which was now dark but still afloat. Nothing was to be done for the ship, which was sinking slowly but would attempt to beach on the Chilean coast. Glasgow turned south and departed. Having inflicted little damage on the enemy, Glasgow escaped with moderate damage considering that an estimated 600 shells were fired at her, although the other British cruisers were lost with all hands.

The following month, Luce, still commanding Glasgow, took part in the Battle of the Falkland Islands. During the battle Glasgow and the armored cruiser HMS Cornwall had chased down the German light cruiser SMS Leipzig; Glasgow closed to finish Leipzig which had run out of ammunition but was still flying her battle ensign. Leipzig fired two flares, so Glasgow ceased fire. At 21:23, more than 80 mi (70 nmi; 130 km) southeast of the Falklands, Leipzig rolled over, leaving only 18 survivors. On 15 March 1915, Luce cornered SMS Dresden, which was scuttled at the end of the Battle of Más a Tierra in neutral waters.

In 1917, Luce was appointed Commodore of the Royal Naval Air Service's Central Depot and Training Establishment at Cranwell. However, the following year when Cranwell became part of the newly founded Royal Air Force (RAF), Luce was replaced by Brigadier General Harold Briggs who had transferred from the Navy to the RAF.

In February 1919, Luce took command of HMS Ramillies and remained as captain until some point in 1920. Towards the close of 1921, Luce was appointed Admiral Superintendent, Malta Dockyard.

== Later life ==
After he had retired from the Navy, Luce served as High Sheriff of Wiltshire from 1930 to 1931. He was promoted admiral on the Retired List on 1 April 1930.

Luce died on 22 September 1932 at Little Cheverell House, Wiltshire. There is a memorial to him in Malmesbury Abbey.

== Notes ==
Military offices
Preceded by C. Maclachlan	Captain of HMS Hibernia; October 1910 – January 1912	Succeeded by E. H. Grafton
Preceded by M. R. Hill	Captain of HMS Glasgow; September 1912 – November 1916	Succeeded by A. C. H. Smith
Preceded by Godfrey Paine	Commodore of the Central Depot and Training Establishment; 1917–1918	Succeeded by Harold Briggs; As GOC No. 12 Group
Preceded by E. P. F. G. Grant	Captain of HMS Ramillies; 1919–1920	Succeeded by A. C. H. Smith
Preceded by Brian Barttelot	Admiral Superintendent, Malta Dockyard; 1921–1924	Succeeded by Charles Johnson
Honorary titles
Preceded by Robert Awdry	High Sheriff of Wiltshire; 1930–1931	Succeeded by C. B. Fry
