= John Briggs =

John, Johnny, Jon, or Jonny Briggs may refer to:

== Arts and entertainment ==
- Johnny Briggs (actor) (1935–2021), English actor
- Jon Briggs (born 1965), English voice actor and journalist
- Jonny Briggs, eponymous BBC children's television programme character

== Law and politics ==
- John R. Briggs Jr. (1822–1872), American politician in Wisconsin
- John Q. Briggs (1848–1921), American politician in Minnesota
- John Briggs (politician) (1930–2020), American politician in California

== Science and medicine ==
- John Joseph Briggs (1819–1876), English naturalist
- John Raleigh Briggs (1851–1907), American physician and psychedelic drug researcher
- John Carmon Briggs (born 1920), American ichthyologist

== Sports ==
- Johnny Briggs (cricketer) (1862–1902), English cricketer
- John Briggs (baseball) (1934–2018), American baseball pitcher
- Johnny Briggs (baseball) (born 1944), American baseball outfielder

== Others ==
- John Thomas Briggs (1781–1865), English accountant-general of the Royal Navy
- John Briggs (East India Company officer) (1785–1875), British civil servant
- John Briggs (bishop) (1789–1861), English Roman Catholic bishop
- John Priestley Briggs (1868–1944), English architect
- John Briggs (author) (born 1945), American academic
