= Senator Briggs =

Senator Briggs may refer to:

== Members of the United States Senate ==
- Frank O. Briggs (1851–1913), U.S. Senator from New Jersey from 1907 to 1913
- Frank P. Briggs (1894–1992), U.S. Senator from Missouri from 1945 to 1947; also served in the Missouri State Senate

== United States state senate members ==
- Ebenezer N. Briggs (1801–1873), Vermont State Senate
- Eddie Briggs (born 1949), Mississippi State Senate
- James F. Briggs (1827–1905), New Hampshire State Senate
- John Briggs (politician) (1930–2020), California State Senate
- John Q. Briggs (1848–1921), Minnesota State Senate
- Richard Briggs (born 1952), Tennessee State Senate

== See also ==
- Briggs (rapper) (born 1986), Australian rapper who self-describes as Senator Briggs
