= Otago Law Review =

- Discipline: New Zealand law
- Language: English
- Edited by: Margaret Briggs

Publication details
- History: 1965–present
- Publisher: Otago Law Review Trust Board (Australia)
- Frequency: Quarterly

Standard abbreviations
- Bluebook: Otago L. Rev.
- ISO 4: Otago Law Rev.

Indexing
- ISSN: 0078-6918
- LCCN: 74641563
- OCLC no.: 01792082

Links
- Journal homepage

Otago Law Review is a peer-reviewed academic law review of the Faculty of Law of the University of Otago. It publishes articles and notes related to study and practice of law, with special focus on issues involving New Zealand law.

The Otago Law Review has been published annually by the Otago Law Review Trust Board since 1965. The members of its editorial board are faculty members of Otago's Faculty of Law. In 2007, its editor was Margaret Briggs, with Barry Allen and Stephen Smith as members of the editorial committee.
