= Charles Briggs (cricketer) =

English cricketer and clergyman

Personal information
- Full name: Charles Edward Briggs
- Born: 17 September 1873; Ashbourne, Derbyshire, England
- Died: 16 December 1949 (aged 76); Sherborne, Dorset, England

Domestic team information
- Years: Team
- 1900: Hampshire
- 1909: Buckinghamshire

Career statistics
Competition	First-class
Matches	6
Runs scored	158
Batting average	15.80
100s/50s	0/1
Top score	58
Catches/stumpings	4/–
- Source: Cricinfo, 24 December 2009

Charles Edward Briggs (17 September 1873 – 16 December 1949) was an English cricketer and clergyman.

Briggs was born in September 1873 at Ashbourne, Derbyshire. He was educated at Winchester College, before going up to Christ Church, Oxford. Alongside his studies at Oxford, Briggs also attended the Wells Theological College in 1896. After graduating from Oxford, he was ordained as a priest and was appointed as curate at Portsmouth in 1897, a post he held until 1901. While living in Portsmouth, he played first-class cricket for Hampshire in 1900, making six appearances in the County Championship. He scored 158 runs in these matches at an average of 15.80 and a highest score of 58, which was his only half century. He moved to Bishops Hatfield in 1901, where he was curate until 1904. From 1904, he was rector at Amersham in Buckinghamshire. Briggs continued to play cricket in Buckinghamshire, with him making a single appearance for Buckinghamshire in the 1909 Minor Counties Championship against the Surrey Second XI. He celebrated 25 years as rector at Amersham in January 1930. He remained rector at Amersham until 1945, before retiring to Sherborne in Dorset, where he on 16 December 1949. He was survived by his wife, Edith, whom he had married in 1903.
