= Kenneth Briggs =

English cricketer and Royal Air Force officer

Personal information
- Full name: Kenneth Robert Briggs
- Born: 17 July 1933 (age 93); Woking, Surrey, England
- Batting: Right-handed
- Bowling: Right-arm off break

Domestic team information
- Years: Team
- 1956: Lincolnshire

Career statistics
Competition	First-class
Matches	1
Runs scored	29
Batting average	29.00
100s/50s	–/–
Top score	17*
Balls bowled	90
Wickets	1
Bowling average	44.00
5 wickets in innings	–
10 wickets in match	–
Best bowling	1/32
Catches/stumpings	2/–
- Source: Cricinfo, 16 February 2019

Kenneth Robert Briggs (born 17 July 1933) is an English former first-class cricketer and Royal Air Force officer.

Briggs was born at Woking and enlisted in the Royal Air Force in July 1954 as a pilot officer, having graduated from the Royal Air Force College Cranwell. He was promoted to flying officer in August 1955. While stationed at Cranwell he played minor counties cricket for Lincolnshire against the Yorkshire Second XI in the 1956 Minor Counties Championship. He was promoted to the rank of flight lieutenant in February 1957. In 1961, he was selected to play a first-class cricket match for the Combined Services cricket team against Nottinghamshire at Trent Bridge. He scored 29 runs in the match, and took the wicket of Roger Vowles. He became a squadron leader in January 1964. Ten years later in January 1974, Briggs was promoted to the rank of wing commander. He was promoted to the rank of group captain in January 1981. He retired from active service in December 1985, retaining the rank of group captain.
