= Henry Briggs (footballer) =

English footballer

Personal information
- Full name: Henry Francis Briggs
- Date of birth: 1871
- Place of birth: Swanwick, Derbyshire, England
- Date of death: 1913 (aged 41–42)
- Position: Goalkeeper

Senior career*
Years	Team	Apps	(Gls)
1891–1892	Tibshelf Colliery		
1892–1893	Mansfield Town		
1893–1896	Darwen	51	(0)
1895–1897	Everton	11	(0)
1897	Nelson		
Total		62	(0)
- * Club domestic league appearances and goals

Henry Francis Briggs (1871–1913) was an English footballer who played in the Football League for Darwen and Everton.
