= Jack Briggs (cricketer) =

English cricketer

Personal information
- Full name: Jack Briggs
- Born: 8 April 1916; Haslingden, Lancashire, England
- Died: 1 June 1984 (aged 68); Rawtenstall, Lancashire, England
- Batting: Right-handed
- Bowling: Slow left-arm orthodox

Domestic team information
- Years: Team
- 1948: Cheshire
- 1939: Lancashire

Career statistics
Competition	First-class
Matches	4
Runs scored	0
Batting average	–
100s/50s	–/–
Top score	0*
Balls bowled	663
Wickets	10
Bowling average	39.10
5 wickets in innings	–
10 wickets in match	–
Best bowling	4/48
Catches/stumpings	2/–
- Source: Cricinfo, 5 February 2012

For people named Jack Briggs, see Jack Briggs (disambiguation).

Jack Briggs (8 April 1916 – 1 June 1984) was an English cricketer. Briggs was a right-handed batsman who bowled slow left-arm orthodox. He was born at Haslingden, Lancashire.

Briggs made his first-class debut for Lancashire against Leicestershire in the 1939 County Championship. He made three further first-class appearances for the county in that season, the last of which came against Derbyshire, with the onset of World War II prematurely ending his first-class career. In his four first-class appearances for Lancashire, he took 10 wickets at an average of 39.10, with best figures of 4/48. With the bat, he batted just twice, ending each innings not out on 0. Following the war, he made eight Minor Counties Championship appearances for Cheshire in 1948.

He played for Haslingden Cricket Club in the Lancashire League from 1933 to 1957. He died at Rawtenstall, Lancashire, on 1 June 1984.

Dudley Carew observed of his bowling style:

"Don't be afraid to give her air" is sound advice to a slow bowler, and indeed a bowler who is so afraid of being hit that he increases his pace and bowls defensively short of a length is not likely to be of much service to his side, but this Briggs went to the other extreme. He must have been the slowest bowler who ever appeared in first-class cricket, and he tossed the ball so high that the batsman had time to change his mind two or three times before he decided on his stroke.
