= Thomas Briggs =

Thomas Briggs may refer to:

- Thomas Briggs (coach), American football coach
- Thomas Briggs (Royal Navy officer) (1780–1852), British naval officer
- Thomas Briggs (died 1864), British banker, murdered by Franz Müller
- Tommy Briggs (1923–1984), footballer
- Sir Thomas Graham Briggs (1833–1887), of the Briggs baronets, member of the Executive Council of Barbados

== See also ==
- Tom Briggs (disambiguation)
