= James Briggs =

James Briggs may refer to:

- James Briggs (musician) (born 1978), American keyboardist and saxophonist
- James E. Briggs (1906–1979), United States Air Force general
- James F. Briggs (1827–1905), United States Representative from New Hampshire
- Jimmy Briggs (footballer) (1937–2011), Scottish footballer
- Jimmy Briggs (politician) (1868–?), Australian-born South African trade unionist and senator

== See also ==
- Jamie Briggs (born 1977), Australian politician
