= Francis Briggs (judge) =

British judge (1902–1983)

The Honourable Sir Francis Briggs

Judge of the Supreme Court of Federation of Rhodesia and Nyasaland
- In office 1958–1963

Justice of Appeal in the East African Court of Appeal (Vice-President 1957)
- In office 1953–1957

Judge of the Supreme Court of the Federation of Malaya
- In office 1949–1953

Personal details
- Born: 9 July 1902
- Died: 6 July 1983 (aged 80)
- Education: Trinity College, Oxford
- Profession: Barrister and colonial judge

Sir Francis Arthur Briggs (9 July 1902 – 6 July 1983) was a British barrister and colonial judge.

== Early life and education ==
Briggs was born on 9 July 1902 to William Francis Briggs and Jane Greig (née Macmillan). He was educated at Charterhouse School and Trinity College, Oxford.

== Career ==
Briggs was called to the Bar by the Inner Temple in 1927. He went to Malaya in 1928, and in the same year joined the law firm Bannon and Bailey of Kuala Lumpur and was admitted to practise at the Federated Malay States Bar. He subsequently practised as an advocate and solicitor in the Federated Malay States, the Straits Settlements and in Johore until the outbreak of World War Two.

In 1940, he was commissioned into the Royal Air Force Volunteer Reserve where he served until 1946. He was mentioned in despatches, and rose to the rank of Wing Commander.

In 1945, Briggs joined the colonial legal service and went to Singapore where he was appointed President of the Superior Court of Singapore. He presided at the trial in the British Officer Court of the first Singapore civilian charged with collaboration during the Japanese occupation of Malaya. He also served as Court Registrar, and as President of the Assessors' Court, and was instrumental in the establishment of the first Juvenile Court.

In 1949, Briggs went to Kuala Lumpur and until 1953 served as a puisne judge of the Supreme Court of the Federation of Malaya.

After leaving Malaya in 1953, Briggs went to East Africa where he served as Justice of Appeal in the East African Court of Appeal until 1958, and was elevated to vice-president of the court in 1957. In 1958, he was appointed Federal Justice of the Supreme Court of Federation of Rhodesia and Nyasaland, where he remained in office until his retirement from the colonial legal service in 1963.

== Personal life and death ==
Briggs married Edna Dorothy (née Keylock) in 1953 and did not have children. He died on 6 July 1983, aged 80.

== Honours ==
Briggs was appointed Knight Bachelor in the 1961 Birthday Honours.
