= Venetia Briggs-Gonzalez =

Belizean wildlife research ecologist

- Born: Belize
- Education: University of Miami
- Scientific career
- Fields: Ecology, Herpetology
- Workplaces: University of Florida; Scientific Reports

Venetia Briggs-Gonzalez, also known as the "croc doc", is a Belizean research ecologist. She specialises in behavioural ecology, herpetology and population dynamics in Belize, Panama and South Florida.

== Biography ==
Briggs-Gonzalez was born Belize in and studied at the University of Miami. In 2007, Briggs-Gonzalez was awarded a fellowship by the Women in Science International Rising Talent programme of the L'Oréal-UNESCO For Women in Science Awards.

Briggs-Gonzalez works as a research ecologist at the University of Florida, United States. She is based at the UF/IFAS Fort Lauderdale Research and Education Center, and is known as the "croc doc." She is also a member of the International Union for Conservation of Nature (IUCN).

Briggs-Gonzalez has been a member of the editorial board of the Scientific Reports academic journal since 2019 and was guest editor in 2024. Briggs-Gonzalez is the lead author of the study American Crocodiles as restoration bioindicators in the Florida Everglades.
