= David Briggs =

David Briggs may refer to:

== Music people ==
- David Briggs (American musician) (1943–2025), American keyboardist and record producer
- David Briggs (Australian musician) (born 1951), Australian guitarist with Little River Band and record producer
- David Briggs (English musician) (born 1962), English organist and composer
- David Briggs (music producer) (1944–1995), American record producer

== Others ==
- Dave Briggs (journalist) (born 1976), American television news anchor
- David Briggs, inventor of Who Wants to Be a Millionaire?
- David Briggs (headmaster) (1917–2020), English headmaster of King's College School, Cambridge
- David Briggs (Lord Lieutenant) (born 1946), High Sheriff of Cheshire (2006) and Lord Lieutenant of Cheshire (since 2010)
- David T. Briggs (born 1954), president of Erie Plating Company
- David Briggs (rugby union) (born 1970), New Zealand rugby union player

== Fictional characters ==
- David Briggs, a character in the 1993 television series The Detectives
