= Mary Blatchley Briggs =

American poet

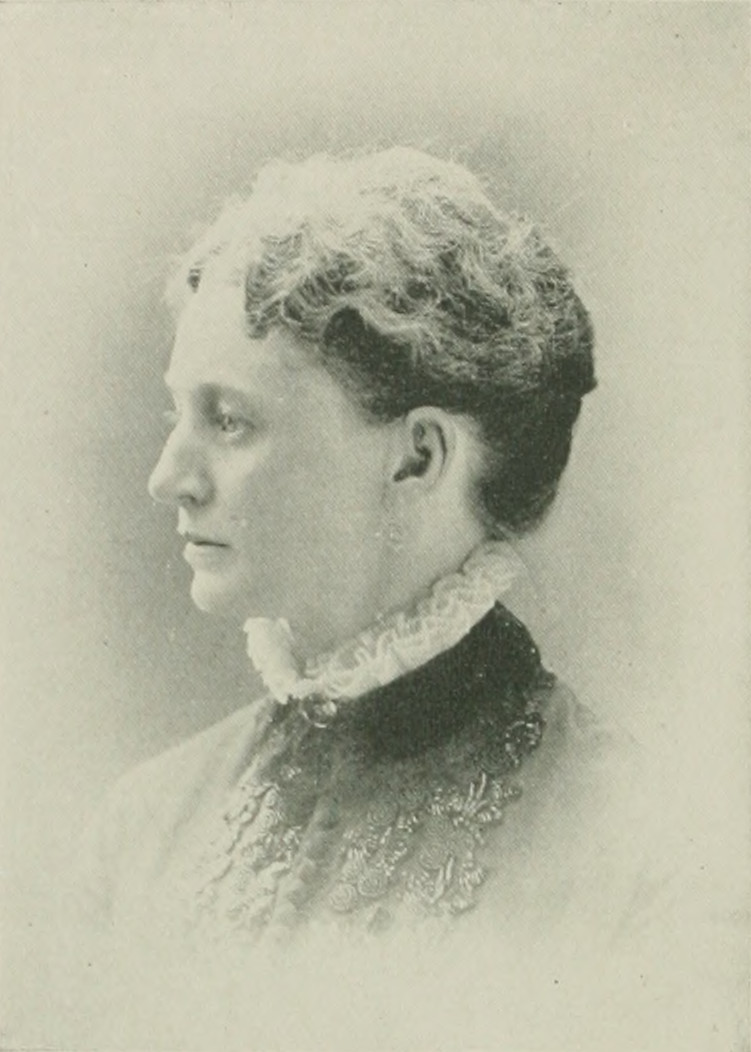
- Photo in A Woman of the Century
- Born: Mary Elizabeth Blatchley; January 1, 1846 Valparaiso, Indiana, U.S.
- Died: November 17, 1910 (aged 64) Washta, Iowa, U.S.
- Resting place: Prospect Hill Cemetery
- Occupation: writer; organizer
- Spouse: John S. Briggs (m. 1867)

Mary Blatchley Briggs (née, Blatchley; January 1, 1846 – November 17, 1910) was an American writer and women's organizer of the long nineteenth century. She served for eleven years as assistant secretary, superintendent, and reporter for the press, and manager of county, state and inter-state fairs. In addition to publishing a volume of poems, she served as secretary of the Western Art Association of Omaha, Nebraska, retiring on January 1, 1891. Briggs was active in organizing woman's work, and also a writer of descriptive matter of the expositions and like areas in which she was interested. Her best known exposition work was for the world's fair at Chicago, where she was one of the two Nebraskans on the Board of Lady Managers of the World's Columbian Exposition and did much toward organizing the Nebraska women for their work for the state and children's building. She managed getting up the representation for her state at New Orleans.

== Early life and education ==
Mary Elizabeth Blatchley was born in Valparaiso, Indiana, January 1, 1846. She was of Scotch, English and Dutch descent. Her mother was a native of Ohio, and her father of Pennsylvania. The father was a practicing physician and surgeon. She had at least two sisters.

Her family migrated from Indiana to Council Bluffs, Iowa, where her early school-days were spent in the public schools, and in the young ladies' seminary, receiving prizes for excellent scholarship. In August, 1861, her family removed to Quincy, Illinois, where she attended the public high school until she was nineteen years old.

== Career ==
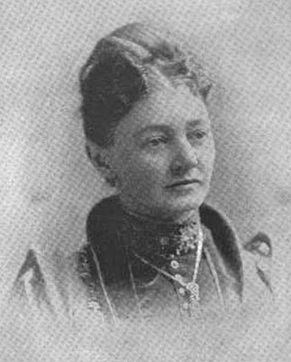
Mary Briggs, 1892

She married John S. Briggs at Council Bluffs, on December 24, 1867. Thereafter, they resided in Omaha, Nebraska. Mr. Briggs was born in Ohio, but was reared in Iowa, removing to Nebraska in 1856. He was the son of Ansel Briggs, first governor of the State of Iowa. John, along with Dr. Miller, was one of the founders of the Omaha Herald.

Briggs filled many important public positions. For eleven years, she served as assistant secretary, superintendent, reporter for the press, and manager of county, State and inter-state fairs. While on a visit to Idaho, she and her husband prepared a collection of minerals, stalactite, and calcareous deposits, which, at the suggestion of the officials of the Union Pacific Railroad, was sent to the New England Manufacturers' and Mechanics' Institute in Boston, Massachusetts. Briggs was interested in art and served as secretary of the Western Art Association, which has 300 members. In literature, she is remembered for her poems, one volume of which compiled and published.

Briggs was selected by Bertha Palmer as one of the six representative women of the West to serve on the executive committee of the Board of Lady Managers of the World's Columbian Exposition in 1893. She was appointed a member of the bylaws judiciary committee, was elected an honorary and corresponding member of the woman's branch of the World's Congress Auxiliary, and served on several committees. She possessed an intimate knowledge of Nebraska, its history, its resources, its development and its people.

== Personal life ==
Briggs had three children: John, Ansel, and Nannie. In religious belief, she was a Presbyterian, and a member of Knox Presbyterian church, later known as the North church. She was vice president of the Douglas County Pioneer's association. In September 1909, in Jackson County, Iowa, she attended the ceremony at the unveiling of the Briggs monument, honoring her late husband's father, Ansel Briggs.

Four weeks before her death, Briggs came down with pneumonia, but she rallied, saw a number of friends, and seemed on the way to recovery. She died suddenly in Washta, Iowa on November 17, 1910, age 64, while visiting her son-in-law and daughter, Mr. and Mrs. A. D. Robertson. Burial was at Prospect Hill Cemetery.
