= List of SWAT Kats: The Radical Squadron characters =

SWAT Kats: The Radical Squadron is an animated series for television created by Christian Tremblay and Yvon Tremblay and produced by Hanna-Barbera and Turner Program Services. The following is a list of characters appearing in the series.

== Characters ==
=== Heroes ===
- Razor (voiced by Barry Gordon) - Jake Clawson is the smaller size but older member of the SWAT Kats. He is a confident leader and an ace mechanical genius who designed the various gadgets and advanced weaponry used in the Turbokat. Razor serves as the radar interceptor and weapons control officer, or RIO, in the Turbokat. He is a martial arts master.
- T-Bone (voiced by Charlie Adler) - Chance Furlong is the larger size but slightly younger member of the SWAT Kats and pilot of the Turbokat jet. T-Bone is very protective of Razor and the Turbokat and becomes upset if anything happens to either. He is also the more daring of the two—in his willingness to take chances (especially when in the Turbokat).

=== Supporting characters ===
- Mayor Manx (voiced by Jim Cummings) - The Mayor of Megakat City for 10 terms. He spends most of his time indulging himself rather than fulfilling his mayoral duties. Manx also tried to rent out Megakat Towers to investors; a first-season running gag had the building constantly being ruined. In the episode "The Ghost Pilot", it is revealed that Manx is descended from a fighter pilot named the Blue Manx who was the sworn enemy of Red Lynx.
- Calico "Callie" Briggs (voiced by Tress MacNeille) - The deputy mayor of Megakat City and the one who is really in charge. The SWAT Kats' biggest supporter, she has a radio communicator which enabled her to call them directly when danger threatened the city. Although she does not know their identities, Callie usually trusted her life to the SWAT Kats if required.
- Enforcers - The Enforcers are the militarized police force of Megakat City.
  - Commander Ulysses Feral (voiced by Gary Owens) - Head of the Enforcers, Feral has a strong and obviously deep hatred for the SWAT Kats, whom he considers as nothing more than "reckless/ruthless vigilantes". He has worked with the SWAT Kats when the situation calls for it, such as in "Katastrophe" and "A Bright and Shiny Future", but he more often calls on his men. Despite his ego, he has a strict sense of justice and tries his best to battle the threats that plague Megakat City.
  - Lt. Felina Feral (voiced by Lori Alan) - Commander Ulysses Feral's niece. Being something of a reckless hot-head herself, she appreciates the help of the SWAT Kats and works openly with them. Ulysses Feral faces a dilemma over her: trying to keep her out of danger but not show any favorable treatment. Furthermore, he has stated that Felina was too good an officer to eject off the force, and his brother would never speak to him again.
  - Lt. Commander Steel (voiced by Hal Rayle) - A high-ranking Enforcer who constantly seeks to replace Commander Feral as leader of the Enforcers. He is actually a bit of a coward and shows no real leadership skills, simply sitting at Feral's desk and dismissing people even if they were victims of a crime.
  - Sgt. Talon (voiced by Ed Gilbert in season one, Jim Cummings in season two) - One of Feral's top Enforcer officers. He says little and carries out Feral's orders without question. He serves as Feral's second-in-command in the field.
- Ann Gora (voiced by Candi Milo) - The star reporter for Kats Eye News.
  - Jonny K. (voiced by Mark Hamill) - Ann Gora's cameraman. A running gag is that Johnny's camera is always destroyed.
  - Al (voiced by Frank Welker in "The Wrath of Dark Kat", Rob Paulsen in "Night of the Dark Kat") - Al is the pilot of the Kat's Eye News helicopter. Although he is a professional at his job, he often shows contempt for Ann Gora's reckless nature.
- Dr. Abby Sinian (voiced by Linda Gary) - The archaeologist and curator of the Megakat City Museum of History. Sinian does not limit herself to the factual and tangible; she is an expert on the supernatural and the occult.
- Professor Hackle (voiced by George Hearn) - Professor Hackle is a scientist who spent his life as a military weapons researcher for Pumadyne. He later renounced his profession and turned to the civilian sector.

=== Villains ===
- Dark Kat (voiced by Brock Peters) - Dark Kat was the main arch-enemy of the SWAT Kats. He is a large, intelligent, and evil purple-skinned kat who intends to destroy Megakat City to create a new lawless town called "Dark Kat City". Being highly intelligent and calculating, Dark Kat often anticipated his foes' actions with great accuracy, and it is a recurring theme throughout the series that all of his hideouts are rigged with explosives. His attempt to bomb the Enforcer headquarters indirectly led to Jake and Chance's employment termination from the Enforcers and the birth of the SWAT Kats.
  - Creeplings (vocal effects provided by Charlie Adler) - Small bat-winged gremlin-like creatures who are Dark Kat's primary henchmen.
- Doctor Viper (voiced by Frank Welker) - Dr. Elrod Purvis was a greedy scientist who worked at Megakat Biochemical Labs. He tried to steal an experimental regenerative formula he and his idealistic colleague Dr. N. Zyme were developing, but fell down the stairs while trying to escape. Purvis was covered in the formula, which transformed him into a reptilian creature. With expertise in the fields of biology, genetics, and robotics, Purvis became a mad scientist and sought to turn Megakat City into "Megaswamp City" and transform the residents into mutants like himself.
- Mac and Molly Mange (voiced by Neil Ross and April Winchell) - Mac and Molly Mange are gangsters who both used to head the most notorious mob syndicate in Megakat City. They drowned when the boat they were in was hit by a larger boat while attempting to escape from Alkatraz prison. Their bodies were found by Professor Hackle's robot servants and their minds were placed in robotic bodies. Refusing to comply with their assigned jobs as robots, the Manges remained criminals and took on the moniker of the Metallikats.
- The Pastmaster (voiced by Keene Curtis) - An undead sorcerer from the Dark Ages who tried to conquer his home city. He traveled through time using his magical mechanical pocket watch, and with his magical spellbook "The Tome of Time", he can summon extinct or mythical creatures such as dinosaurs and dragons. He despises all forms of modern technology and is constantly trying to rid the world of it and return things to the former "glory" of his home time.
- Hard Drive (voiced by Rob Paulsen) - Hard Drive is a technological thief whose coat gives him a number of abilities focused around electricity and electronics. Primarily seen is his ability to transform himself into electrical energy, thus allowing him to travel through power, telephone, and computer lines. Besides this, he can manipulate electronic device and download and delete data quickly. Hard Drive is powerless without his surge coat and is actually very scrawny.
- Morbulus (voiced by Jim Cummings) - An evil pilot who has eyes in the back of his head. He bombs oil refineries with his fighter jet until defeated by the SWAT Kats. After giving the SWAT Kats the slip, he is found by Doctor Viper in a sewage pipe and mutated into a monstrous bacteria who can duplicate when injured.
- Katscratch (voiced by Jim Cummings) - A gangster-turned-crime boss who used to work for Mac and Molly Mange. He is known for smuggling catnip, which is viewed as a narcotic. When the Manges return as the Metallikats, they kill Katscratch for his betrayal.
  - Fango (voiced by Neil Ross) - Katscratch's business partner who was badly injured in the explosion caused by Mac Mange's exploding cigar.
  - Katscratch's Mobsters (variously voiced by Jim Cummings, Charlie Adler, and Ed Gilbert) - Four identical-looking mobsters who worked for Katscratch up until his death. They and Fango were badly injured in the fire from Mac Mange's exploding cigar.
- Rex Shard (voiced by John Vernon) - A convict sentenced to life in prison who was accidentally exposed to the radiation of an experimental diamond mining machine while testing it for prison warden Cyrus Meece. Shard was transformed into a crystalline monster with the ability to turn anything he touches into crystal. He is stopped by the SWAT Kats, reverted to normal, and sent back to prison.
- The Ci-Kat-A (vocal effects provided by Frank Welker) - A race of cicada-like aliens who can transform others into Ci-Kat-As via their bite. After arriving on Earth, the Ci-Kat-A queen infects Dr. Harley Street, other scientists, and the guards. When the SWAT Kats confront her, the queen escapes with Street and travels to the Metrokat Nuclear Power Plant. There, the queen grows into a giant form after feeding on radiation. The SWAT Kats and the Enforcers battle the queen and ultimately destroy the queen's hive. The queen is then crushed by a piece of the burning Megakat Tower.
- Dr. Harley Street (voiced by Robert Ridgely) - Dr. Harley Street is an astronomer who was bitten by a Ci-Kat-A and later mutated into one himself. Street tries to help the alien queen to achieve its full power by letting her eat the radioactive material from Megakat Nuclear Power Plant, but is thrown out of the Megakat Tower by Razor.
- Madkat (voiced by Roddy McDowall) – Ages ago, Madkat was an insane and powerful court jester who was replaced. He sought revenge on the jester who replaced him and the king, queen, and knight who imprisoned him in a dungeon. When he died, his spirit inhabited a jack-in-a-box which he owned. Centuries later, once brilliant comedian-turned-asylum patient Lenny Ringtail escapes and fuses with the jester's spirit after finding the jack-in-a-box in a store and gains the ability to warp reality at a whim.
- The Red Lynx (voiced by Mark Hamill) – The ghost of a Mega War II flying ace who pilots a red biplane. T-Bone says he learned a lot about dogfighting from studying the Red Lynx's maneuvers. The Red Lynx stole a prototype plane from the Enforcers and tried to kill Mayor Manx, who was the great-grandson of his greatest opponent, the Blue Manx. The SWAT Kats, along with Mayor Manx, thwart the Red Lynx and destroy his plane.
- Lord Mutilor (voiced by Michael Dorn) – A lobster-like alien warlord who attacks Earth using a stolen Aquian spaceship to steal all of its water so he can sell it to a desert world. The SWAT Kats kill Mutilor by blowing up his fighter craft and save Captain Grimalken and his crew from harm. Mutilor was named for a goldfish owned by a friend of series writer Lance Falk.
- Turmoil (voiced by Kath Soucie) – A villainous cat who intends to conquer Megakat City by controlling the airspace, with the help of the Omega Squadron, her squadron of female pilots, if the citizens of Megakat City do not pay her. Turmoil tries to seduce T-Bone, by showing him modified airplanes that supposedly never went as far as the drawing board. T-Bone overcomes Turmoil's influence and manages to stop her.
- The Evil SWAT Kats (voiced by Barry Gordon and Charlie Adler) – Villainous variations of the SWAT Kats from a parallel dimension who serve the alternate dimension's Dark Kat and plot with the alternate Callie Briggs to overthrow Megakat City's government. They exhibit alternate characteristics to the real SWAT Kats such as Razor being a bossy shot, T-Bone being a clumsy and a lousy pilot, and the two of them hating each other.
- Alternate Calico "Callie" Briggs (voiced by Tress MacNeille) - A version of Callie Briggs from an alternate dimension where the SWAT Kats are evil. She is in league with her dimension's Dark Kat in his plans to take over Megakat City.
- Mega-Scorpions - The Mega-Scorpions are ordinary cave-dwelling scorpions who were mutated into humanoid forms by toxic waste and share a hive mind. The Mega-Scorpions begin preying on nearby miners, who they feed to their leader. Feral and the Swat Kats defeat hordes of the Mega-Scorpions, but are forced to flee from the Mega-Scorpion leader. The Mega-Scorpion Leader grabs the Turbo Kat, but is destroyed when the Swat Kats fly into Earth's atmosphere, which causes the leader to explode.
- Volcanus (vocal effects provided by Frank Welker) - A giant volcanic monster on Anakata Island who was inadvertently awakened when Mayor Manx and Mr. Young destroyed a sacred stone that kept it dormant.
- Zed (voiced by Charlie Adler) - Zed is a robot created by Dr. Leiter Greenbox who was designed to analyze mechanical objects and reassemble them. After the Metallikats steal it in a bid to repair themselves, Zed's programming is corrupted, causing its artificial intelligence to evolve. Zed creates a robot body out of assimilated metal and attempts to acquire a weapons satellite to destroy Megakat City. T-Bone uses a torn piece of cable to attack Zed's brain, destroying it.

=== Other characters ===
- Mr. Young (voiced by Robert Ito) - A Siamese cat who owns a large foreign corporation.
- Dr. Leiter Greenbox (voiced by Robert Patrick in "Chaos in Crystal", Nick Chinlund in "Unlikely Alloys") - A scientist whose inventions always seem to go wrong. He is the creator of the Gemkat 6000, a mining device that turned Rex Shard into a crystalline monster; and the robot Zed. Greenbox is assimilated by Zed and survives its destruction, after which he is turned over to the Enforcers.
- David Litterbin (voiced by John Byner) - A parody of David Letterman, Litterbin is the undisputed "King of Late Night" and host of The David Litterbin Show. Razor is his biggest fan.
- Burke and Murray (voiced by Mark Hamill and Charlie Adler) - Two brothers employed to dump junk in the salvage yard that Jake and Chance work in.
- Little Old Lady (voiced by Candi Milo) - A cranky old lady whose car always seemed to be breaking down. She consistently threatened to report Jake and Chance to her auto club, but never actually did. On one occasion, she received a free pizza and three free tune-ups as an apology from Jake and Chance for when their vigilantism took priority over a towing job.
- Dr. N. Zyme (voiced by Paul Eiding) - A biochemist who works for Megakat Biochemical Labs. He intended to create anti-mutagens that would preserve and benefit katkind, but his biggest hope Viper Mutagen 368 proved to be worthless after it transformed Elrod Purvis into Doctor Viper.
- Captain Grimalken (voiced by Michael Bell) - The leader of the Aqueons, a race of blue cat-like aliens who are naturally nonviolent and peaceful; they would rather be taken prisoner than fight back.
