= Governor Briggs =

Governor Briggs may refer to:

- Ansel Briggs (1806–1881), 1st Governor of Iowa
- Frank A. Briggs (1858–1898), 5th Governor of North Dakota
- George N. Briggs (1796–1861), 19th Governor of Massachusetts
