= Margaret Briggs =

New Zealand law professor

- Born: 1964

Academic background
- Education: University of Otago
- Academic advisor: Kevin Dawkins

Academic work
- Institutions: University of Otago

Margaret Briggs is a New Zealand legal academic, and is a full professor at the University of Otago, specialising in family law, property law and criminal law, especially the law of criminal attempt. She is a barrister solicitor of the High Court of New Zealand, and was an editor of the Otago Law Review for many years.

== Academic career ==
Briggs graduated from the University of Otago with a Bachelor of Laws with first class honours, and in worked as a barrister solicitor at the firm of Laidlaw, O'Driscoll and Marks, before joining the faculty of the University of Otago as a teaching fellow in 1987. She became a tutor in 1988, and went to complete a Master of Law with distinction, titled Mistake of law at the University of Otago in 1994. Briggs then joined the faculty of the University of Otago, rising to associate professor in 2011, and then full professor in 2017.

Briggs is interested in criminal law, family law and relationship property law. She has examined the law of criminal attempt, and when preparation to commit an act becomes an attempt. Briggs has also written on errors of law. In relationship property law, Briggs has examined the Property (Relationships) Act 1976, which determines how joint property should be divided after a couple's separation or one partner's death. She researches such topics as what type of property should be included as relationship property, and how debts and increases in value of separate property should be dealt with. In her inaugural professorial lecture, Briggs said that she was drawn to study situations in law where one party holds more power than the other.

Briggs was a long-serving editor of the Otago Law Review.

== Selected works ==
- Briggs, Margaret (2015). "The conduct requirement in the law of attempt: A New Zealand perspective". Common Law World Review. 44 (2): 145–167. doi:10.1177/1473779515585276. Wikidata Q124613984.
- Briggs, Margaret (2009). "Relocating Officially Induced Error of Law: Fitting the Remedy to the Wrong". Common Law World Review. 38 (1): 1–26. doi:10.1350/clwr.2009.38.1.0181. Wikidata Q124613994.
- Briggs, Margaret (2013). "Criminal law". New Zealand Law Review. 1: 137–158. ISSN 1173-5864. Wikidata Q124613995.
