= Bill Briggs (American football coach) =

American football coach (born c. 1953–1954

Biographical details
- Born: c. 1953 or 1954 (age 72–73); Salem, Oregon, U.S.
- Education: University of Oregon (1977); Wayne State College; University of Montana

Coaching career (HC unless noted)
- ?–1992: William Penn (assistant)
- ?: Wayne State (NE) (assistant)
- ?: UNLV (assistant)
- 1998–1999: West Virginia Tech (OC/QB)
- 2000: Union (KY) (AHC/OC)
- 2001: Mount Senario
- 2002: Billings Outlaws (OC)
- 2002–2003: Rocky Mountain (OC/QB)
- 2004–2005: Billings Outlaws / Mavericks (OC)
- 2005: West Virginia Tech
- 2006: Colstrip HS (MT) (QB)
- 2006–2007: Billings Outlaws (OC)

Head coaching record
- Overall: 3–18

Bill Briggs (born c. 1953 or 1954) is an American football coach. He served as the head football coach at West Virginia University Institute of Technology in Montgomery, West Virginia for the 2005 season, compiling a record of 0–11.

== Head coaching record ==
Year	Team	Overall	Conference	Standing	Bowl/playoffs
Mount Senario Fighting Saints (Upper Midwest Athletic Conference) (2001)
2001	Mount Senario	3–7		3rd	
Mount Senario:		3–7			
West Virginia Tech Golden Bears (West Virginia Intercollegiate Athletic Conference) (2005)
2005	West Virginia Tech	0–11	0–8	9th	
West Virginia Tech:		0–11	0–8		
Total:		3–18			
