= Robert Briggs (character) =

Robert "Bob" Briggs is a fictional screenwriter living in 1940s Hollywood. His one appearance to date is in Aldous Huxley's dystopian satire Ape and Essence.

Briggs is famous for his fascinating smile.

== Hollywood career ==
Briggs writes for Lou Lublin Productions. (Huxley wrote screen versions of 19th century English novels for producers Hunt Stromberg, William Goetz, Kenneth Macgowan and Orson Welles, as well as a life of Mme. Curie for Sidney Franklin). He has just been denied a raise, a disappointment with repercussions for his love life. The industry is tightening its belt; Hollywood mogul Schmuel Gelbfisz has announced to the press that those under him may well see their salaries reduced by half.

He has no automobile of his own, but uses his wife Miriam's Buick convertible.

Briggs is—or was—serious about art; he deplores popular escapism as an abuse of it. He knows exactly how many tens of millions of dollars were raked in by Amanda, a vapid musical love story, three winters previously—during the Ardennes Offensive.

In early 1946 he began scripting a life of Catherine of Siena, who in 1366 had mystically married Jesus. Having to sex it up, he elaborated a character from a suitor mentioned in her letters. His script has been reworked three times by others before getting to production, but the lover-character remains; Lublin hopes to get Humphrey Bogart for the part (an unlikely prospect, as 1948 will see him starring in several films by John Huston).

Brigg's relationship with Elaine began as his involvement in the Catherine script was concluding. His long avoidance of its physical consummation—i.e. of technical adultery—mirrors his disenchantment with what in Hollywood passes for the creative process. "When you finally get what you want," he tells his friend, Huxley's narrator, "it's never what you thought it was going to be."

Another symbol of spiritual death is the long drought (or drouth) upon southern California; this finally breaks when Briggs instinctively reads a script by a Mojave recluse (rejected by Lublin) after the Narrator reads him part of it.

== Romantic Identity ==
The Goya that Briggs wanted his lover to have

Briggs thinks of himself as a Romantic -- "as all the Romantic poets rolled into one", according to his fellow, the unnamed narrator of the Tallis section of Huxley's novel—specifically as Keats, dying in love; as Shelley, recklessly following his heart; as Byron, the darkly towering exile; as Beddoes, the mortality-obsessed suicide.

Yet of these fatal figures it is Shelley who resonates most in Brigg's life, and not for the manner of his death but for his dereliction regarding his infant son and pregnant 19-yr-old wife Harriet. (But on the bright side, cf also his poem Adonaïs with which Huxley closes the Script, the novel's second, main and final section).

It has been noted that Briggs is a reader of letters. He would in all likelihood have read Fanny Brawne's letters to Keats, published ten years before Brigg's encounter with Tallis.

The buttes of the southwestern Mojave Desert remind Briggs of one of Goya's evil landscapes, though it was the foreground matter that had compelled him to buy his lover a reproduction of the work.

== Sexual Delusion ==
Briggs has recently taken Elaine to Acapulco for an adulterous get-away. Though he 'd long put off moving their relation to that level, he is yet disappointed, claiming to have thought it was going to be what he wanted. The precise nature of the disappointment is hinted at by Huxley's narrator, who tells us Briggs is basically impotent and hence may have been avoiding the physical act of love for these nearly two years only in order to protect himself. If that is so then his voicing of moral qualms may be dishonest: his behaviour with Rosie (below) is evidence for this; the Narrator's reference to Goya's terrifying "saurian rats", however, suggests that Briggs' impotence may have honest roots.

=== Rosie ===
Briggs is first made aware of Rosie when he hears her singing the popular song Now Is the Hour in the kitchen of the Cottonwood Ranch. The song would be a year-long hit for Huxley's compatriot the vocalist Gracie Fields, who during the war had come to the USA with her husband Mario Bianche lest he be interned as an enemy alien. Fields picked up Now Is the Hour in New Zealand, a place of some importance in Tallis's screenplay.

Rosie appears in a fetching black sweater and tartan skirt. The narrator notes the "technically perfect" look with which she greets Briggs, and is reminded of other upwardly-mobile kittens in history and literature: of Ninon de l'Enclos, mistress of France Antarctique founder Gaspard de Coligny; of Emy Lyon, installed at Sir Harry Fetherstonhaugh's South Downs mansion; of Anna Karenina; of Morphil.

That she is disquieteningly “simultaneously innocent and knowing” foretells (by seven years) the words of another, masochistic and unreliable narrator, Humbert Humbert.

Completing the picture of pre-nubile predation, Rosie's cousin Katie is annoyed by her laziness.
