= Leland Lawrence Briggs =

- Born: April 24, 1893
- Died: November 12, 1975 (aged 82)
- Education: Harvard University, Northwestern University, University of South Dakota
- Occupations: Accounting scholar, professor

Leland Lawrence Briggs (April 24, 1893 – November 12, 1975) was an American accounting scholar, and Professor at the University of Vermont, known as founder of The Accountants Digest, which he edited and published until 1973.

== Biography ==
Briggs was born in Byron, Minnesota to Edward Wellington, a farmer, and Alice (McPeak) Briggs. After primary education in Byron and Rochester, Minnesota, he obtained his BA in 1923 and his MA in 1924 both at the University of South Dakota. Subsequently, he obtained MBA at Northwestern University in 1927 with the thesis, entitled "Some Legal Aspects of Goodwill." and his PhD from Harvard University in 1930-31.

Briggs had started his career as teacher at the public school in 1911. In 1924 he was appointed Professor of commerce at McPherson College in Kansas. In 1926 had joined the Northwestern University as Noyes scholar. In 1927 he moved to the University of Vermont, where he served the rest of his academic career. He had started as assistant professor in economics, was promoted associate professor in 1929, and in 1952 to professor of economics.

In 1935 Briggs founded the accounting periodical Accountants Digest. The first issue included digests of "120 articles taken from 48 periodicals published in the United States, Canada, England, Australia, New Zealand and Scotland." He edited and published the periodical until 1973, and then sold it to E. Samuel Germain, Professor of Syracuse University.

== Selected publications ==
- Briggs, Leland Lawrence. Centralized Accounting Control for the Small Business. 1924.
- Briggs, Leland Lawrence, ed. The Accountants Digest. Vol. 3. Germain Publishing Company, 1937.

=== Articles, a selection ===
- Briggs, L. L. "Goodwill–Definition and Elements in Law." Journal of Accountancy (September 1928) (1928): 194-203.
- Briggs, L. L. "Accounting in Collegiate Schools of Business." Accounting Review (1930): 175-181.
- L. L. Briggs, "Stock Dividends." The Journal of Accountancy, March, 1930, pp. 193–201.
- Briggs, L. L. "Accounting and the courts." Accounting Review (1931): 184-191.
- L. L. Briggs: Dividends from stock premiums. Journal of Accountancy, Nr. 5. May 1932.
- L. L. "Appreciation and Dividends." The Journal of Accountancy, July, 1932, pp. 29–37.
- Briggs, L. L. "Stockholders' Liability for Unlawful Dividends." Temp. LQ 8 (1933): 145.
- L. L. Briggs, “Asset Valuation in Dividend Decisions,” The Areounting Review (September 1934), pp. 184–191
