= Bob Briggs (chemist) =

New Zealand organic chemist (1905–1975)

- Born: Lindsay Heathcote Briggs; 3 January 1905; Hastings, New Zealand
- Died: 16 January 1975 (aged 70); Auckland, New Zealand
- Education: Auckland University College; University of Oxford
- Known for: Contribution to the structure of strychnine; chemistry of New Zealand native plants
- Awards: Hector Medal (1943)
- Scientific career
- Fields: Organic chemistry
- Workplaces: University of Auckland
- Thesis: (1932)
- Doctoral advisor: Robert Robinson

Lindsay Heathcote "Bob" Briggs (3 January 1905 – 16 January 1975) was a New Zealand organic chemist. His research focused on "the nature and constitution of chemical compounds to be found in New Zealand native flora".

== Early life ==
Born in Hastings in 1905, Briggs was educated at Hastings District High School and Auckland Grammar School.

== Academic career ==
After graduating from Auckland University College with a Master of Science with second-class honours in 1928, he received funding to research manuka oil the following year, and undertook independent research at Massey Agricultural College from 1929 to 1930. He became a Fellow of the Chemical Society in London in 1929.

He then went to the Dyson Perrins Laboratory at Oxford University for a PhD under Robert Robinson, investigating the chemical structure of strychnine. He was awarded his doctorate in 1932 and returned to Auckland, where he was appointed as a lecturer in organic chemistry in 1933, and remained a member of their staff until his death.

In 1941 he was awarded a DSc from Auckland University College. He was a member of the Auckland Institute and Museum, and was its President from 1952 to 1955. He was elected a Fellow of the Royal Society of New Zealand in 1942 and served as its president from 1956 to 1958. He was a Fellow of the New Zealand Institute of Chemistry, received the ICI Prize and Medal in 1949, and became its president in 1959. He was awarded the Hector Medal by the society in 1943. In 1953, he was awarded the Queen Elizabeth II Coronation Medal. He was also president of the Auckland Science Teachers Association and the Auckland Referees Association.

He was also an active member of the Auckland University field club.
