= John Q. Briggs =

American politician

John Q. Briggs (July 21, 1848 - 1921) was a Minnesota Republican who served in the Minnesota State Senate for the First District in the 35th and 36th Legislative sessions, years 1907–1911. His city of residence was Houston, Minnesota when elected, on November 6, 1906, which remained the same throughout his time in the Senate. Born in Roscoe, Illinois in 1848, he moved to Minnesota in 1874, his occupation as a farmer. He died in 1921 at age 73.

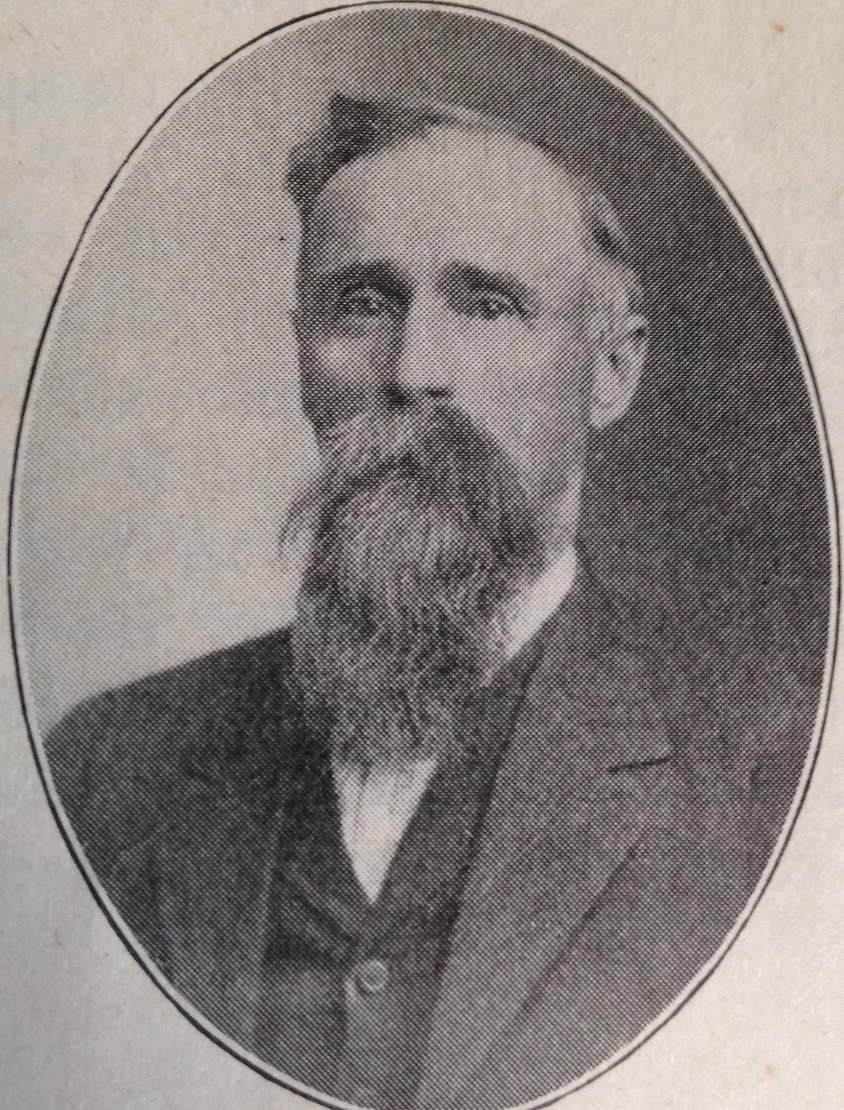
John Q. Briggs, 1909.
