= Jack Briggs (broadcaster) =

American sportscaster

Jack Briggs is an American radio broadcaster.

Originally from Cleveland, Ohio, Briggs is currently Assistant Sports Director for the Associated Press. He has been with AP Radio for 30 years and is currently the on-air anchor for 50 sportscasts per week. Briggs is also one of the AP's two primary anchors for Olympic programming, having been to every Olympics since 1980.

Briggs did play-by-play work on broadcasts of Utah Stars games in the American Basketball Association until the team's demise in December 1975. He has also called college basketball games for many years.
