= Tom Briggs (rugby league) =

Australian rugby league player

Personal information
- Full name: Thomas Henry Briggs
- Born: 29 July 1919; Young, New South Wales
- Died: 4 March 1991 (aged 71); Penshurst, New South Wales, Australia

Playing information
- Position: Centre
Club
Years	Team	Pld	T	G	FG	P
1946–47	Western Suburbs	10	5	0	0	15
1948–49	St. George	17	16	0	0	48
	Total	27	21	0	0	63
- Source: Whiticker/Hudson

Tom Briggs (29 July 1919 – 4 March 1991) was an Australian rugby league footballer from the 1940s.

Tom Briggs was a very fine rugby league player from Young, New South Wales. He starred in Rugby League Army teams during World War Two including a match representing NSW against Queensland servicemen held on Bougainville in which he was man of the match. After he returned from the war, Briggs joined the Western Suburbs Magpies in 1946. Tom married in 1946 and moved to the St.George area at the end of the 1947 season.

Tom Briggs had two brilliant seasons at the St. George Dragons in 1948 & 1949, scoring 16 tries from 17 games. Injuries towards the end of the 1949 season curtailed his career.

Tom Briggs died in Sydney on 4 Mar 1991, aged 71.
