= Bob Briggs (Australian footballer) =

Australian rules footballer (1883–1955)

Personal information
- Full name: Robert Ernest Briggs
- Born: 20 November 1883; South Melbourne, Victoria
- Died: 6 July 1955 (aged 71); South Melbourne, Victoria
- Original team: Williamstown

Playing career^{1}
Years	Club	Games (Goals)
1909–1910	Fitzroy	26 (47)
1911	St Kilda	7 (7)
Total		33 (54)
- ^{1} Playing statistics correct to the end of 1911.

Robert Ernest Briggs (20 November 1883 – 6 July 1955) was an Australian rules footballer who played with Fitzroy and St Kilda in the Victorian Football League (VFL).

== Football ==
Originally from Port Rovers, Briggs played for Victorian Football Association (VFA) club Williamstown in 1907 and 1908, playing 24 games and kicking 63 goals. Briggs played in Williamstown's 1907 premiership victory over West Melbourne at East Melbourne Cricket Ground in 1907 and kicked 59 goals in 1908, the highest season tally recorded to that date by a Williamstown player. Briggs was also the first Williamstown player to kick 10 goals in a match, against North Melbourne at Arden Street Oval in round 16, 1908.

Switching to Fitzroy, Briggs made eight senior appearances in the 1909 VFL season and didn't miss a game in 1910, winning Fitzroy's leading goal-kicker award with 30 goals.
