= Bob Briggs (American football) =

American football player (1945–1997)

No. 68, 84
- Position: Defensive lineman

Personal information
- Born: April 28, 1945; Toledo, Ohio, U.S.
- Died: May 5, 1997 (aged 52); Sanibel Island, Florida, U.S.
- Listed height: 6 ft 4 in (1.93 m)
- Listed weight: 258 lb (117 kg)

Career information
- High school: Brighton (Rochester, New York)
- College: Heidelberg College
- NFL draft: 1967: 9th round, 223rd overall pick

Career history
- San Diego Chargers (1968-1970); Cleveland Browns (1971–1973); Kansas City Chiefs (1974)

Career NFL/AFL statistics
- Games played: 84
- Games started: 31
- Fumble recoveries: 5
- Interceptions: 1
- Touchdowns: 2
- Stats at Pro Football Reference

Robert James Briggs (April 28, 1945 – May 5, 1997) was an American professional football defensive lineman who played in the American Football League (AFL) and the National Football League (NFL). He played seven seasons for the San Diego Chargers, Cleveland Browns, and Kansas City Chiefs.

== See also ==
- List of American Football League players
