= Raymond Westcott Briggs =

American army general (1878–1959)

- Born: July 19, 1878; Beaver, Pennsylvania, US
- Died: December 24, 1959 (aged 81); San Francisco, California, US
- Military career
- Branch: United States Army
- Rank: Brigadier General
- Service number: 0-1233
- Commands: 304th and 311th Field Artillery Regiments
- Awards: Distinguished Service Medal (U.S. Army)

Raymond Westcott Briggs (July 19, 1878 – December 24, 1959) was a United States Army officer and served as a Brigadier general during World War I.

== Early life ==
Briggs was born in Beaver, Pennsylvania. He attended the University of Pennsylvania for 2 to 3 years, he even played on the earliest all-American football team there. He enlisted in the army on July 20, 1898, due to the Spanish–American War.

== Military career ==
Briggs was commissioned as a second lieutenant of infantry on August 31, 1900. The following year on April 18 he transferred to the artillery corps. From 1901 to 1902, Briggs was in the Philippines, acting as a sort of custodian of Emilio Aguinaldo.

He returned to the United States in 1904 and was stationed at Fort Miley in San Francisco, California. Two years later, as a lieutenant, he helped save property from the fire that followed the great San Francisco Earthquake by blowing up buildings to create a firebreak. From 1912 to 1914, Briggs was the American representative in JapanFrom 1912 to 1914, Briggs was the American representative in Japan accompanied by his wife Helen and young son (later U.S.N. Admiral), Cameron. .

In August 1917, Briggs was on the staff of General John J. Pershing with the rank of colonel. Briggs commanded the 304th and 311th Field Artillery Regiments in France until August 8, 1918, when he was promoted to the rank of brigadier general. At the age of forty he was the second youngest brigadier general in the AEF and one of the youngest generals in the U.S. Army at the time. He was then appointed commanding general of the Eighth and Eighteenth Field Artillery Brigades along with chief of the Remount Service. These services earned him the Distinguished Service Medal (U.S. Army).

When the war ended, Briggs returned to his rank of colonel, and served under Douglas MacArthur as his chief of staff in the Philippines. On June 30, 1942, Briggs retired from active service, but was immediately recalled to active duty as commanding general, Seventh Corps Area. He officially retired on February 20, 1944.

== Awards ==
Briggs was given the Distinguished Service Medal for his services as being chief of the Remount Service of the AEF.

== Death and legacy ==
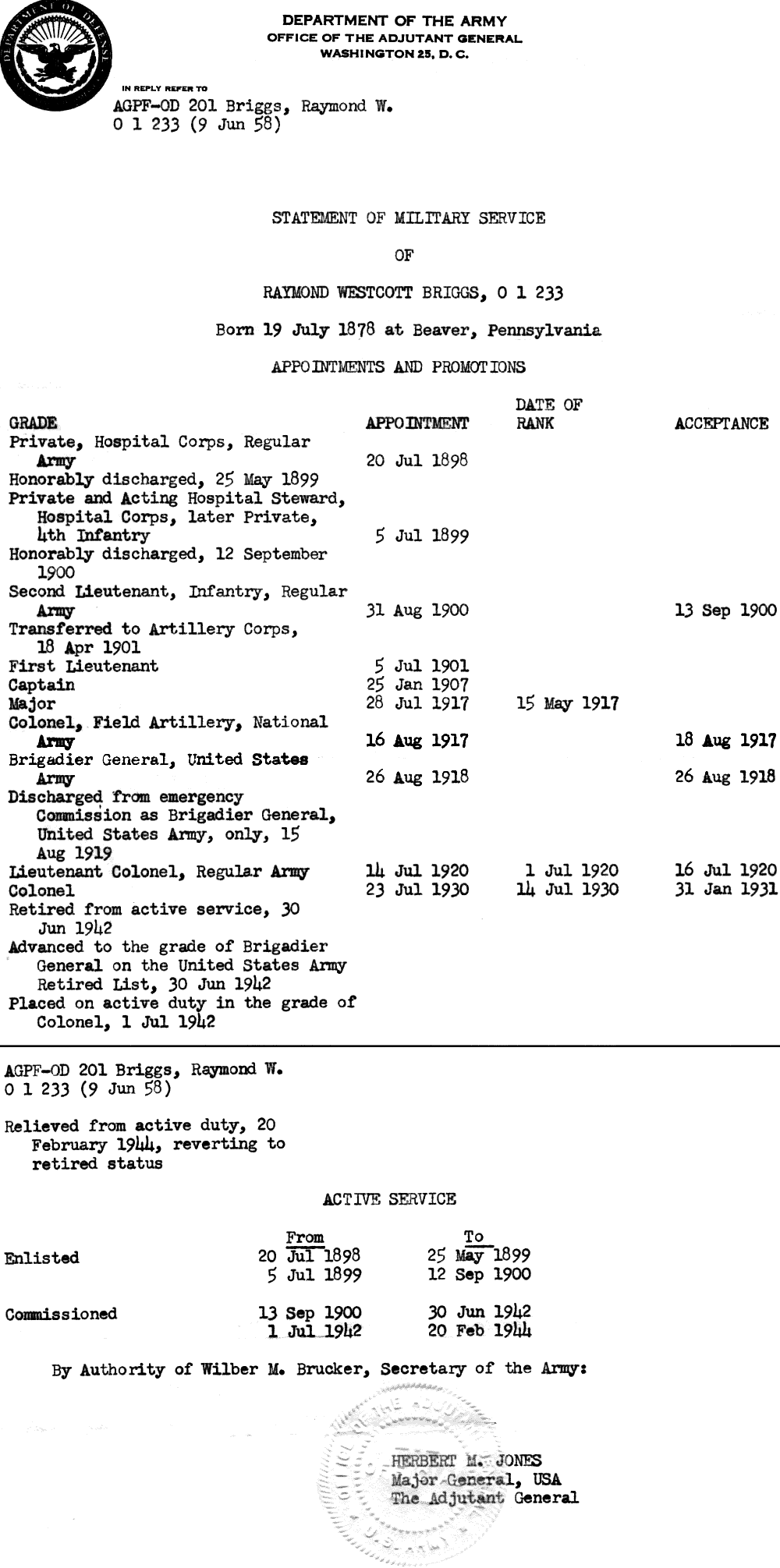
R.W.Briggs' Service Statement

Briggs was of a few men who served in both World Wars as well as having a record of two years as an enlisted soldier and forty-four years of commissioned service. Briggs died at the age of eighty-one on December 24, 1959 and was interred with his wife Helen Cameron Briggs, in the San Francisco National Cemetery at the Presidio.

== Bibliography ==
- Davis, Henry Blaine Jr. Generals in Khaki. Raleigh, NC: Pentland Press, 1998. ISBN 1571970886 OCLC 231779136
