= Billy Briggs =

American singer-songwriter

Billy Worth Briggs III (born June 8, 1977 in Lubbock, Texas, United States) is an American independent musician and songwriter residing in McKinney, Texas. He has written numerous songs.

== Career ==
"What I Need" (performed by The Briggs Brothers' Band) is featured in the 2006 film release, 29 Reasons to Run. The soundtrack for the movie is composed entirely of independent artists, and has been as equally recognized as the movie itself, winning the Director's Choice Gold Medal of Excellence for Best Impact of Music in a Feature Film at the 2006 Park City, Utah Film-Music Festival, and the Best Original Music Award at the 2006 Bare Bones International Film Festival.
