= Anarchism in Nigeria =

Anarchism in Nigeria has its roots in the organization of various stateless societies that inhabited pre-colonial Nigeria, particularly among the Igbo people. After the British colonization of Nigeria, revolutionary syndicalism became a key factor in the anti-colonial resistance, although the trade union movement deradicalized and took a more reformist approach following the country's independence. The contemporary Nigerian anarchist movement finally emerged from the left-wing opposition to the military dictatorship in the late 1980s and saw the creation of the Awareness League.

== History ==
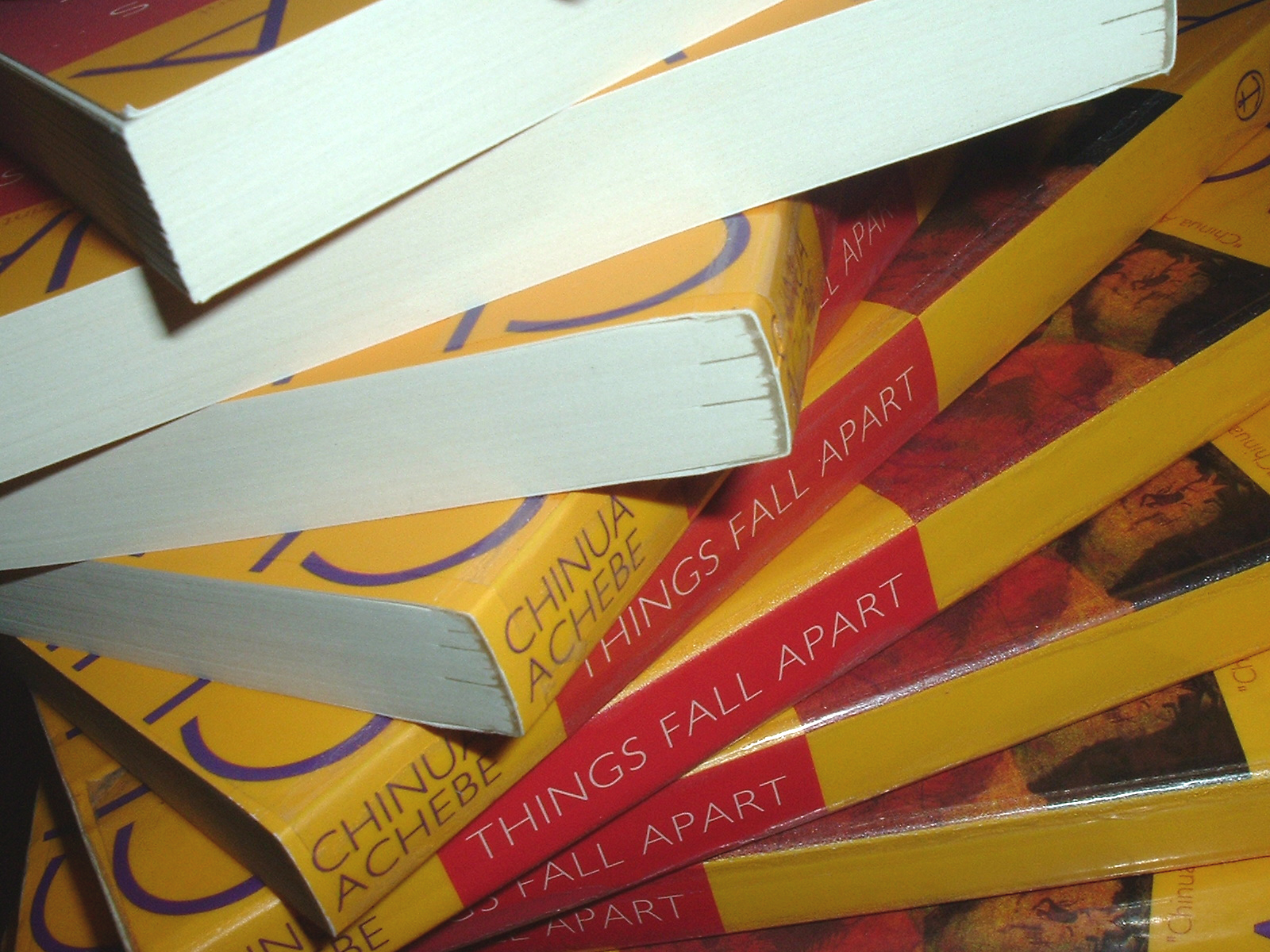
Things Fall Apart by Chinua Achebe depicts pre-colonial Igbo society and how it changed with the arrival of British colonial rule.

With the exception of the north, which was largely dominated by the Sokoto Caliphate, many of the peoples in pre-colonial Nigeria lived in stateless societies. According to the Nigerian anarchist Sam Mbah, these stateless people groups included the Igbo, Birom, Angas, Idoma, Ekoi, Ibibio, Ijaw, Urhobo and Tiv. Particular attention was given to the Igbo, whose political organization was based on a quasi-democratic republican system of government. In tight knit communities, this system guaranteed its citizens equality, as opposed to a feudalist system with a king ruling over subjects. With the exception of a few notable Igbo towns such as Onitsha, which had kings called Obi, and places like the Nri Kingdom and Arochukwu, which had priest kings; Igbo communities and area governments were overwhelmingly ruled solely by a republican consultative assembly of the common people. Communities were usually governed and administered by a council of elders. Due to the incompatibility of the Igbo decentralized style of government and the centralized system including the appointment of warrant chiefs required for indirect rule, British colonial rule was marked with open conflicts and much tension. Under British colonial rule, the diversity within each of Nigeria's major ethnic groups slowly decreased and distinctions between the Igbo and other large ethnic groups, such as the Hausa and the Yoruba, became sharper.

=== The early Nigerian labor movement ===
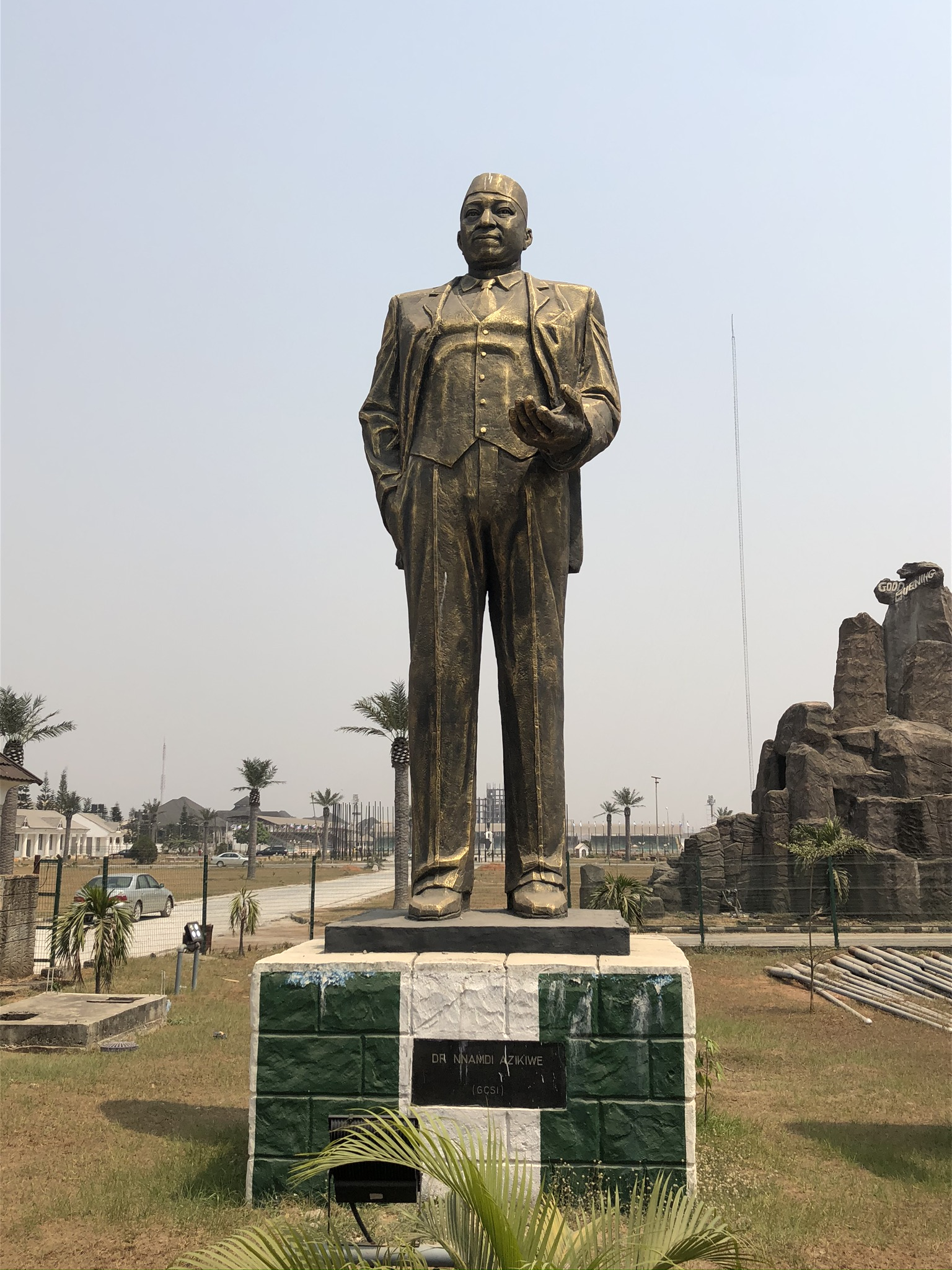
Nnamdi Azikiwe, an early anti-colonial leader and inspiration for the Nigerian workers' movement.

The Nigerian labor movement began to constitute itself almost immediately after the introduction of British capitalism to the region. During the early 1900s, agitation increased in response to the imposition of employment contracts, which obliged work without any provisions for workers' rights. Nigerian workers became conscious of the racial disparities opening up in Colonial Nigeria, with European workers earning more than Africans for the same work. Conditions worsened during the Great Depression, as the colonial government imposed direct taxation on Nigerian workers and converted permanent employment into day labor. The rumours that the Igbo women were being assessed for taxation sparked off the Women's War in Aba, a massive revolt organized and executed by women. Inspired by the anti-colonial writings of Nnamdi Azikiwe, Nigerian workers became more radicalized throughout the 1930s, aiming to bring an end to British colonial rule through class conflict.

The rise of syndicalism was spearheaded by Michael Imoudu, who led the Railway Workers' Union in initiating the country's first ever strike actions, culminating in the 1945 Nigerian general strike. Subsequent strikes only strengthened the workers' movement, which saw the rise of class consciousness and the emergence of anti-capitalist and anti-state ideas, as well as the use of more militant tactics such as sabotage. Trade unions began to serve as a strong counterweight to the trade monopolies held by multinational corporations such as Unilever and even went on to advocate for the socialization of Nigeria's economy. Trade union leaders eventually began to establish formal alliances with nationalist political parties, with the National Council of Nigeria and the Cameroons even being described by Michael Crowder as a "confederation of trade unions". Despite the labor movement having contributed in large part to the independence of Nigeria, the capitalist system remained in place after independence. With the achievement of the country's independence, the Nigerian labor movement largely lost its revolutionary syndicalist tendencies, with many trade unions taking on reformist and class collaborationist lines.

=== Independence and military rule ===
The Republic of Biafra, a breakaway region in the southeast and the subject of the Nigerian Civil War.

In 1960, the Federation of Nigeria became independent from the British Empire, later evolving into the First Nigerian Republic under the parliamentary government of Abubakar Tafawa Balewa. During this period, left-leaning factions within Western and Eastern regional governments established a program of farm settlements, based on the Kibbutz system, with the intention of recreating the pre-colonial communal way of life. These self-managing settlements were made up of farmers and their families living on collectives, where the means of production were held in common and the produce yielded was distributed equally among the inhabitants, while agricultural surplus was exchanged by cooperatives. However, the egalitarian principles of the program were eventually eroded away, after the First Republic was overthrown in a coup d'état, which instituted the first Nigerian military junta under the Supreme Military Council, led by Yakubu Gowon. The coup was followed by a counter-coup and an anti-Igbo pogrom, during which thousands of Igbo people were estimated to have been killed, with a further 1 million Igbos fleeing from the Northern Region to the Eastern Region.

After the military junta reneged on the Aburi Accord, which had promised to decentralize power in Nigeria, the Igbo military leader Chukwuemeka Odumegwu Ojukwu unilaterally declared the independence of Biafra. Due to Ojukwu carrying out the instructions of a Consultative Assembly and the voluntary construction of the Biafran Armed Forces, Stephen P. Halbrook compared him to the Ukrainian anarchist revolutionary Nestor Makhno, although this libertarian characterization is disputed. Eventually, the "Biafran Revolution" was defeated militarily and Biafra was reincorporated into Nigeria, under centralized military rule.

After the election of Shehu Shagari as President of Nigeria, the Supreme Military Council handed power over to a new civilian government, ending over a decade of military rule and establishing the Second Nigerian Republic. However, the new government was beset by political corruption, and introduced the first austerity measures of the country's history in 1981. This republic was short-lived, and was overthrown by another Supreme Military Council in the 1983 Nigerian coup d'état, led by Muhammadu Buhari. This second military junta was also short-lived, as it was itself overthrown by the Armed Forces Ruling Council in the 1985 Nigerian coup d'état, led by Ibrahim Babangida, who resumed the implementation of austerity policies under a structural adjustment program by the IMF.

=== The contemporary Nigerian anarchist movement ===
During this period of military rule, the left-wing opposition to the military junta began to engage in a debate on the future of Nigeria. Workers of the Nigeria Labour Congress (NLC) published a manifesto, which proposed socialism as a viable option for the future of economic and political life in Nigeria, calling for workers' control of the means of production. Anarchism also emerged from these debates, with a leftist coalition called The Axe being established at the University of Ibadan in 1983. The Axe developed anarchist tendencies and published a number of periodicals, but the group was eventually dissolved during the crisis experienced by the Nigerian left during the late 1980s. Meanwhile, the Awareness League (AL) was established as a study group at the University of Nigeria, bringing together a broad coalition of Marxists, Trotskyists, human rights activists and leftists. During their studies, the AL took particular interest in A Look at Leninism by Ron Tabor, a repudiation of Marxism-Leninism and state socialism. With the advent of the Revolutions of 1989, many Nigerian left-wing activists began to re-examine their commitments to Marxism, leading the Awareness League to officially embrace anarchist politics in 1990. The AL thus grew from a small study group into a large-scale anarchist organization, with around 1000 members distributed in every single southern state, as well as in three northern states, and eventually being admitted as the Nigerian section of the IWA-AIT.

During the 1993 Nigerian presidential election, the Awareness League were among the progressive groups that supported the social democratic candidate Moshood Abiola, believing that "the installation of a left-of-center government was a minimum condition for the propagation and pursuit of anarcho-syndicalist struggle and ideals." Despite Abiola's victory over the pro-military candidate Bashir Tofa, the results were annulled by Ibrahim Babangida, causing widespread protests and political unrest that ultimately led to the resignation of Babangida, with an interim government being established in his place. The nascent Third Nigerian Republic was itself overthrown by Sani Abacha in a coup d'état, restoring military rule over Nigeria. The Awareness League reaffirmed its rejection of military rule and resumed its collaboration with other leftist organizations in order to resist the new government.

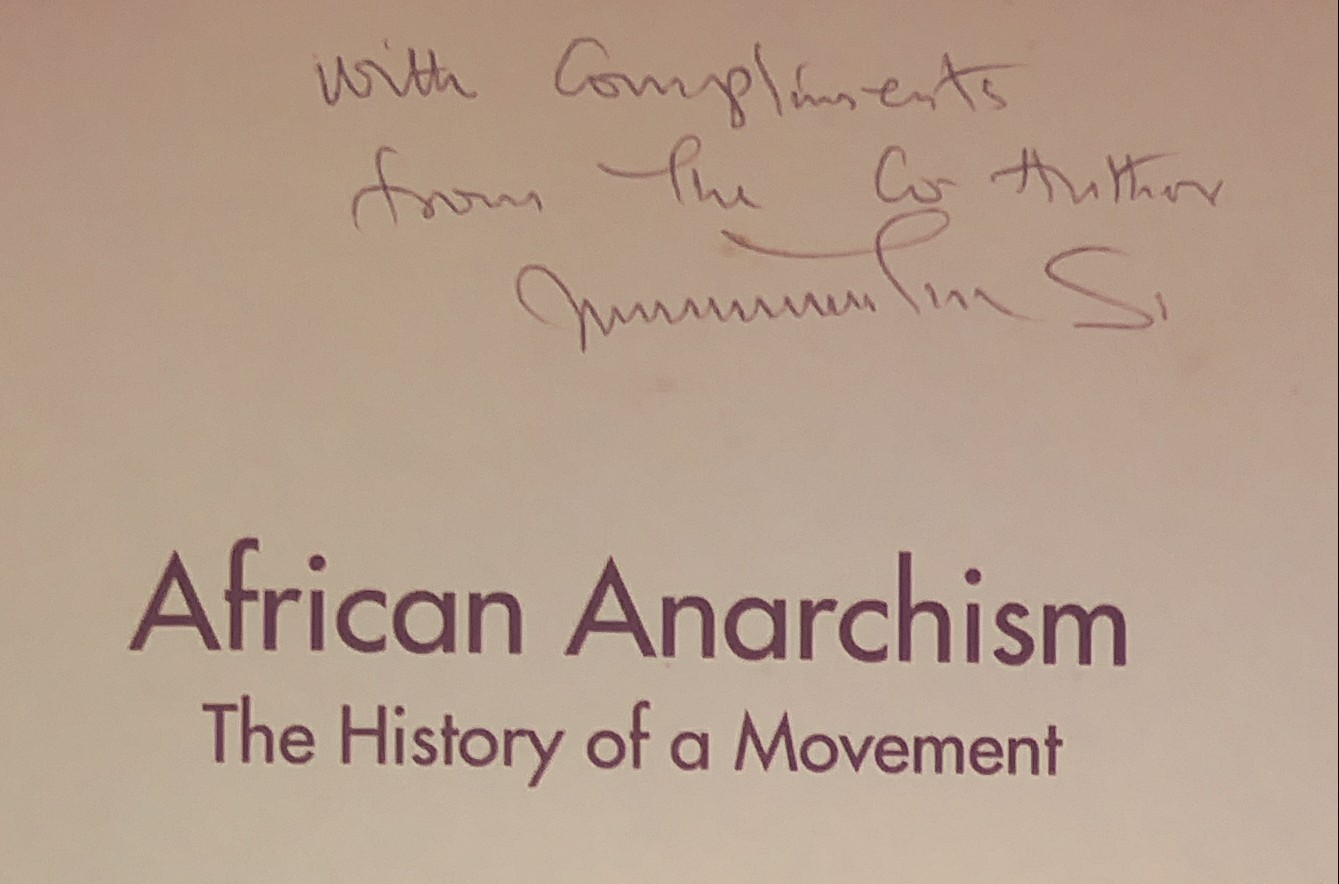
A copy of African Anarchism inscribed by Sam Mbah: "With Compliments from the Co Author"

The struggle against the dictatorship reached an apex in 1994, when petroleum workers called a strike demanding the end of the military dictatorship. The Awareness League and other trade unions joined the strike, bringing economic life around Lagos and the southwest to a standstill. After calling off a threatened strike in July, the NLC reconsidered a general strike in August after the government imposed conditions on Abiola's release. On 17 August 1994, the government dismissed the leadership of the NLC and the petroleum unions, placed the unions under appointed administrators, and arrested Frank Kokori and other labor leaders. According to Sam Mbah, "never since the civil war of the 1960s had the Nigerian state come so close to disintegrating."

With the death of Sani Abacha in 1998, his successor initiated a transition back to democratic rule, establishing the Fourth Nigerian Republic. In the wake of democratization, many community groups and leftists organizations were now left without the common enemy of military rule, leading some - including the Awareness League - to begin fragmenting. During this period, Sam Mbah and I.E. Igariwey published their book African Anarchism, which compiles a history of the anarchist movement in Africa and draws from the anarchic traditional practices of many of Nigeria' indigenous peoples.

During the End SARS protests of 2020, which called for the abolition of the Special Anti-Robbery Squad, protestors set fire to police stations, government buildings and banks, while also releasing prisoners. President Muhammadu Buhari reacted to the movement by warning young Nigerians of anarchists that were allegedly attempting to hijack the protests and stated that the federal government "would not tolerate anarchy in the country".

== See also ==
- Category:Nigerian anarchists
- List of anarchist movements by region
- Anarchism in Africa

== Bibliography ==
- Mbah, Sam; Igariwey, I.E. (1997). African Anarchism: The History of a Movement. Tucson, Arizona: See Sharp Press. ISBN 9781884365058. OCLC 614189872.
