= Anarchism in Africa =

Anarchism in Africa refers both to purported anarchic political organisation of some traditional African societies and to modern anarchist movements in Africa.

== "Anarchic elements" in traditional cultures ==
Sam Mbah and I. E. Igariwey in African Anarchism: The History of a Movement make the claim that:

To a greater or lesser extent, all of ... traditional African societies manifested "anarchic elements" which, upon close examination, lend credence to the historical truism that governments have not always existed. They are but a recent phenomenon and are, therefore, not inevitable in human society. While some "anarchic" features of traditional African societies existed largely in past stages of development, some of them persist and remain pronounced to this day.

The reason why traditional African societies are characterised as possessing "anarchic elements" is because of their relatively horizontal political structure and, in some cases, the absence of classes. In addition to that, the leadership of elders normally did not extend into the kinds of authoritative structures which characterise the modern state. A strong value was, however, placed on traditional and "natural" values. For example, although there were no laws against rape, homicide, and adultery, a person committing those acts would be persecuted together with his or her kin. The principle of collective responsibility was sometimes upheld.

Class systems had already existed in some African civilisations (such as Nubia, Egypt, Axum and the Hausa Kingdoms) for millennia, but processes of social stratification accelerated from the fifteenth century onwards.

== Modern anarchist movements ==
=== Algeria ===
The French anarcho-syndicalist Émilie Busquant is commonly credited with creating the first copy of the Flag of Algeria. The anarchist Pierre Morain was also the first person from France to be arrested for publicly supporting the cause of Algerian independence.

=== Angola ===
From the 1890s onwards, Angola became one of the destinations for anarchists that had been exiled by successive Portuguese governments, possibly resulting in the development of a syndicalist presence in the colony. Following the 28 May 1926 coup d'état, Portuguese anarchists participated in a failed revolt against the new military dictatorship, after which the General Confederation of Labour (CGT) was outlawed. As a result, in October 1927, the CGT leader Mário Castelhano was himself deported to Angola, where he stayed for two years, before making his way back to Portugal. In the wake of the Portuguese general strike of 1934, the Estado Novo established a concentration camp on the north bank of the Kunene River, to which they deported some anarcho-syndicalists that were involved in the strike.

During the Angolan War of Independence, many Angolans began to develop anti-authoritarian systems of "popular power", during which people took control of and transformed their own lives while fighting against the Portuguese colonial authorities. However, once Angola achieved its independence following the Carnation Revolution, people were disarmed by the new MPLA government, which officially adopted Marxism–Leninism as its ideology and replaced the nascent "popular power" with a one-party state, igniting the Angolan Civil War. The MPLA began to arrest left-wing opposition figures, including Maoists, Trotskyists and anarchists, and broke up workers' strikes for higher pay and better working conditions. In 1977, a power struggle between MPLA moderates (led by Agostinho Neto) and radicals (led by Nito Alves), culminated in an attempted coup d'état, after which the radicals were purged from the party's ranks and power was centralized further around the MPLA leadership.

=== Chad ===
During World War II, many Spanish republicans served as part of the Long Range Desert Group and French Foreign Legion during the North African campaign. On May 13, 1943, the 9th Company of the Régiment de marche du Tchad was established in Chad from these Spanish republican volunteers, which included many anarchists. In September 1943, the company was transferred to Morocco and then the United Kingdom, as part of the 2nd Armored Division, going on to participate in the Battle for Normandy and the Liberation of Paris.

=== Egypt ===
The anarchist movement first emerged in Egypt in the late nineteenth century, but collapsed in the 1940s. The movement has reemerged in the early 2010s.

The movement re-entered global view when a number of anarchist groups took part in the 2011 Egyptian revolution, namely the Egyptian Libertarian Socialist Movement and Black Flag. The Egyptian anarchists have come under attack from the military regime and the Muslim Brotherhood. On October 7, 2011, the Egyptian Libertarian Socialist Movement held their first conference in Cairo.

=== Eswatini ===
In 2003, the Zabalaza Anarchist Communist Front (ZACF) began to build an underground presence in Eswatini, with Swazi members joining the organization. ZACF began to openly support the pro-democracy movement and popularised anarchist ideas among young people, with some members even working within the Swaziland Youth Congress (SWAYOCO). On October 1, 2005, eight SWAYOCO members, including the ZACF member Mandla Khoza, were arrested by police during a youth demonstration in Manzini, which had been protesting against the suppression of the pro-democratic opposition.

At the turn of 2006, 17 petrol-bombings were carried out by pro-democracy militants against state targets. Several democracy activists were arrested and charged with treason, while an article in the Times of Swaziland accused ZACF of having carried out an attack on a police vehicle during a demonstration in Manzini. This claim was denied by the ZACF, who issued a statement to the Times in which they reiterated their support for the pro-democracy movement and stated that the Swazi ZACF branch had denied taking part in the bombing. The ZACF subsequently noted the emergence of an armed struggle tendency within the pro-democracy movement, but they considered this to not be a viable option for liberation, instead proposing the construction of a mass movement for a participatory economy, while not ruling out armed self-defence.

At the December 2007 ZACF congress, it was decided to restructure the organisation, establishing the Eswatini section as its own autonomous group. Members of SWAYOCO subsequently set up an anarchist study circle in Siphofaneni, organizing the transport of anarchist materials from South Africa into Eswatini. Mandla Khoza also attempted to establish a community project in this time, but activity in the following years was limited, due to the poor living conditions of many pro-democracy activists. The year of 2008, which PUDEMO had slated to be the year of democratization, passed without any democratic reforms taking place.

=== Ethiopia ===
In the 1960s, students at Addis Ababa University began to protest against the absolutist rule of Haile Selassie I, establishing the University Students Union of Addis Ababa (USUAA) in 1966 to coordinate the campaign, which culminated in a general strike in early 1974, called by the Confederation of Ethiopian Labor Unions (CELU). This campaign against the monarchy eventually resulted in a coup d'état by a military junta known as the Derg, which overthrew the Ethiopian Empire and established a Marxist-Leninist one-party state in its place. During the Red Terror, the Derg used the term "anarchist" to describe many of its enemies, ordering the purge of "anarchists" from Ethiopia. Some more radical Ethiopian students, who saw themselves as the true standard-bearers of the Ethiopian Revolution, came to label the Derg as "fascist", after a number of students had been arrested by the government, with some accused of being "anarchists" for opposing the land reform program.

In 2020, the Horn Anarchists collective was established to spread anarchist ideas throughout the Horn of Africa, particularly in Ethiopia and within the Ethiopian diaspora. The Horn Anarchists have been active in the campaign against the Tigray War, which they have described as a "genocide", analyzing it as a product of the rising nationalism and a political shift to the right-wing under the government of Abiy Ahmed and the ruling Prosperity Party.

=== Guinea-Bissau ===
Between the 10th and 14th centuries CE, the Balanta people first migrated from Northeast Africa to present-day Guinea-Bissau, to escape drought and wars. During the 19th century, the Balanta resisted the expansion of the Kaabu Empire, earning them their name, which in the Mandinka language translates literally to "those who resist". The Balanta organize their society largely statelessly and without social stratification, with elder councils deciding on day-to-day matters. They also practice gender equality, with Balanta women taking ownership of what they themselves produced. Property and land are mostly held in common among the Balanta, with some personal property being allowed for subsistence farming and the means of production being held by individuals and their families.

In 1885, the Berlin Conference brought the entire territory of Guinea-Bissau under the effective occupation of the Portuguese Empire, which had previously only occupied a few settlements in the area. During the 1890s, Portuguese Guinea was established as a separate military district, to promote Portugal's occupation, which began to impose taxes on the indigenous population and grant concessions to foreign companies to fund its expanding occupation. During this time, Guinea-Bissau was in part used as a penal colony for anarchists that had been exiled by successive Portuguese governments. Indigenous resistance to colonial rule continued well into the 20th century. By the time that the 28 May 1926 coup d'état established a military dictatorship in Portugal, most of Guinea-Bissau had been occupied, administered and taxed, a process that was finally completed by the Estado Novo in the mid-1930s.

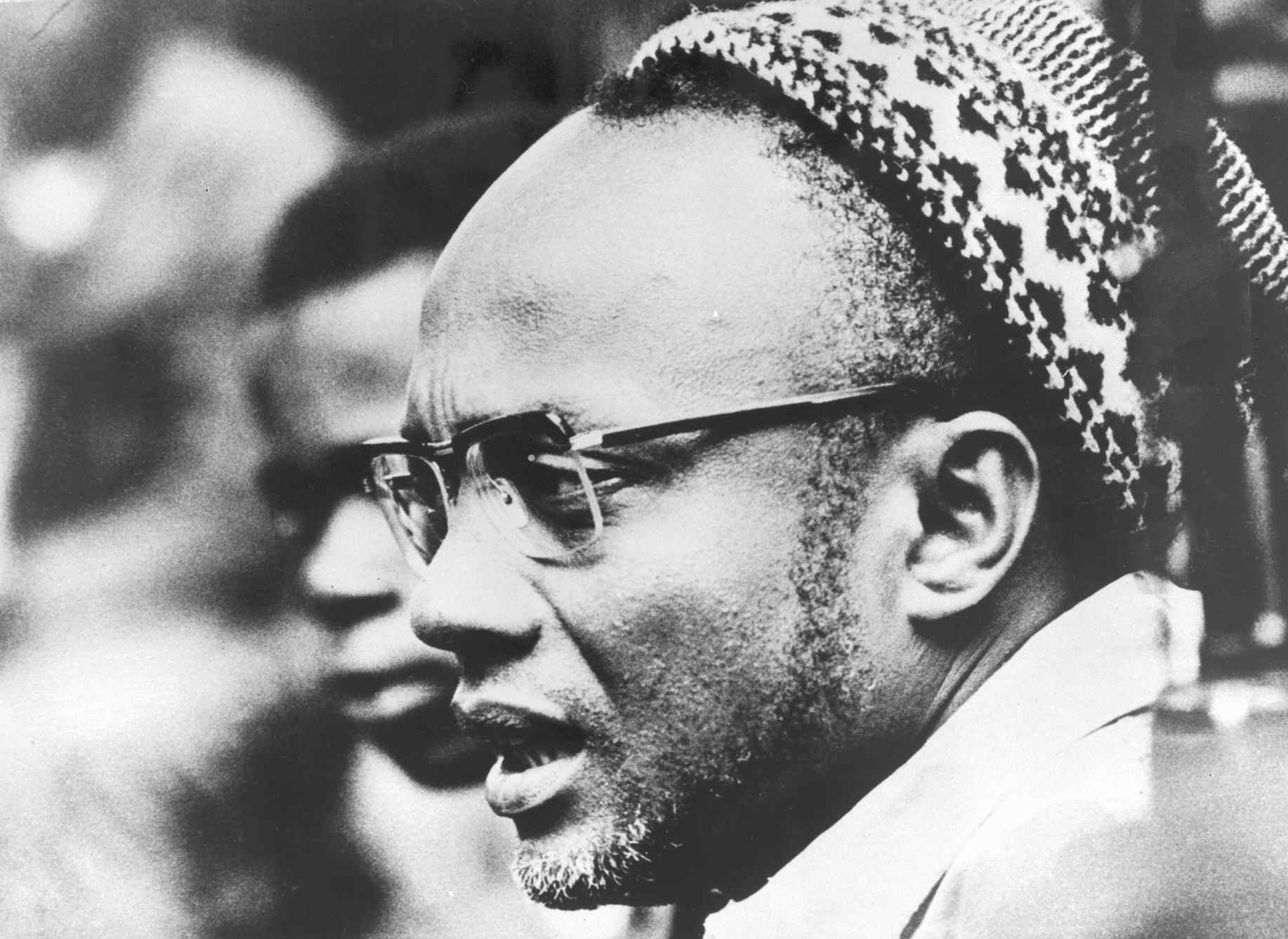
Portrait of Amílcar Cabral, leader of the Bissau-Guinean independence movement.

In the 1950s, the Bissau-Guinean activist Amílcar Cabral began to agitate against the Estado Novo, advocating for the independence of Portugal's African colonies. He established the African Party for the Independence of Guinea and Cape Verde (PAIGC) to coordinate the struggle, though he insisted the party "is not a system of chieftainship", instead organizing along anti-elitist and anti-bureaucratic lines, in contrast to vanguardism. Power instead lay in self-administering village committees, which were elected and recallable, rather than in party officials, as Cabral had stated that "we do not want any exploitation in our countries, not even by black people." In 1963, the independence struggle evolved into the Guinea-Bissau War of Independence, in which the Revolutionary Armed Forces of the People (FARP) led an armed guerilla war against the Portuguese colonial authorities. The FARP was itself made up of unpaid volunteers and was not hierarchically structured, instead decentralizing command as much as possible. These decentralist tendencies led Stephen P. Halbrook to consider Cabral as "one of the great libertarians of our age", although this libertarian socialist characterization is disputed.

=== Kenya ===
According to oral tradition, the Kikuyu people were once ruled by a despotic king who was deposed in a popular uprising, which instituted a democratic system in the place of monarchy. This saw the establishment of the Ituĩka ceremony, a tradition in which the old guard handed over the reins of society to the next generation, to avoid the institution of a dictatorship. The Kikuyu subsequently lived under a system of social equality, without class or gender stratification, where a federation of councils organized society from the bottom-up. But with the arrival of the Imperial British East Africa Company and establishment of the East Africa Protectorate, the new British colonial authorities reintroduced a centralized autocratic system, appointing chiefs to rule over the Kikuyu. The last Ituĩka ceremony passed power from the Maina generation to the Mwangi generation in 1898. The next scheduled Ituĩka ceremony was eventually thwarted by the British colonial authorities, which cemented its centralized rule over the Kikuyu with the establishment of Kenya Colony.

During the early 20th-century, the Ghadar Movement gained support from Indian expatriates in Kenya, remaining active up until the independence of India.

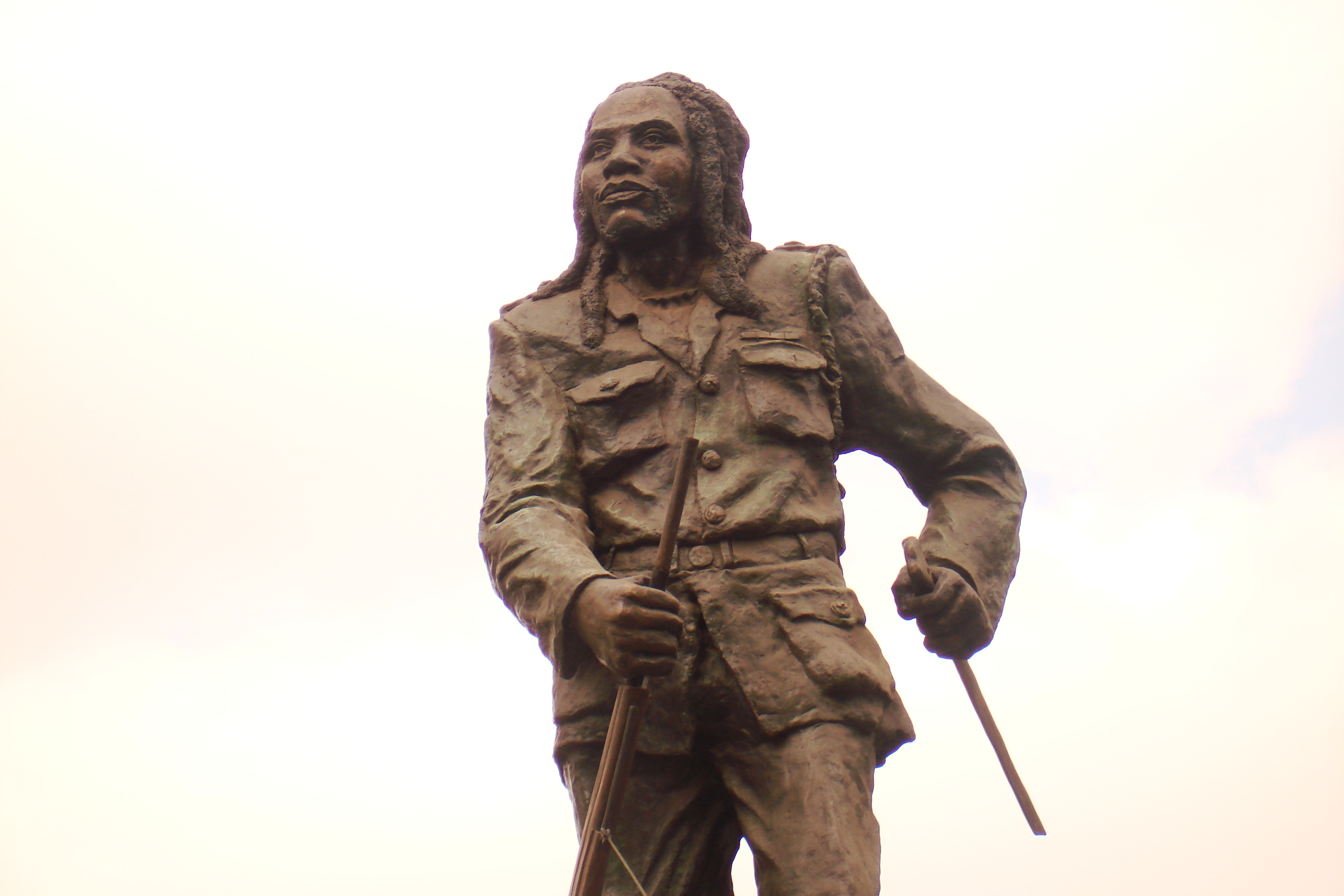
Statue of the Mau Mau freedom fighter Dedan Kimathi.

In 1952, the Mau Mau uprising broke out, during which the Kenya Land and Freedom Army (KLFA) revolted against the rule of the British Empire in Kenya, fighting for Kenyan independence. The KLFA was largely decentralized, with action being initiated by local cells, re-organizing the bottom-up council system that had been dissolved by colonial rule. The capture of rebel leader Dedan Kimathi on October 21, 1956, signalled the defeat of the Mau Mau. However, the rebellion survived until after Kenya's independence from Britain. The Mau Mau Uprising was described by Stephen P. Halbrook as "the expression of centuries of anarchism and resistance to authoritarianism, among the Kikuyu people" although this characterization is disputed.

Popular opposition to the arap Moi government eventually led to the democratization of the country in 1992 and the victory of the National Rainbow Coalition in the 2002 Kenyan general election. Following this period of political opening, left-wing ideas and groups began to re-emerge throughout Kenya. In part influenced by the materials of the Zabalaza Anarchist Communist Front, the Anti-Capitalist Convergence of Kenya (ACCK) was established in 2003, as a coalition of Kenyan anarchists and socialists. The Wiyahti Collective was established in 2004 as a specifically anarchist section of the ACCK, with ZACF also establishing contact with the Wiyathi activist Talal Cockar.

=== Libya ===
Italian anarchists were among the prominent opponents to the invasion of Libya, as part of a broader anti-militarist campaign against the expansionism of the Italian Empire. During the campaign, the anarchist sailor Augusto Masetti shot a colonel as he was addressing troops that were departing for Libya and shouted "Down with the War! Long Live Anarchy!". Anarchists also organized demonstrations and strikes to prevent troops from embarking.

The Nigerian anarchist Sam Mbah identified anarchic elements within the Third International Theory proposed in the Green Book of Muammar Gaddafi, particularly in the concept of the Jamahiriya. The government of the Great Socialist People's Libyan Arab Jamahiriya officially stated that Libya was a direct democracy without any political parties, governed by its populace through local popular councils and communes (named Basic People's Congresses). Official rhetoric disdained the idea of a nation state, tribal bonds remaining primary, even within the ranks of the national army. However, Mbah noted that these principles were followed "more in the breach than in practice" and criticized the Libyan government's poor human rights record.

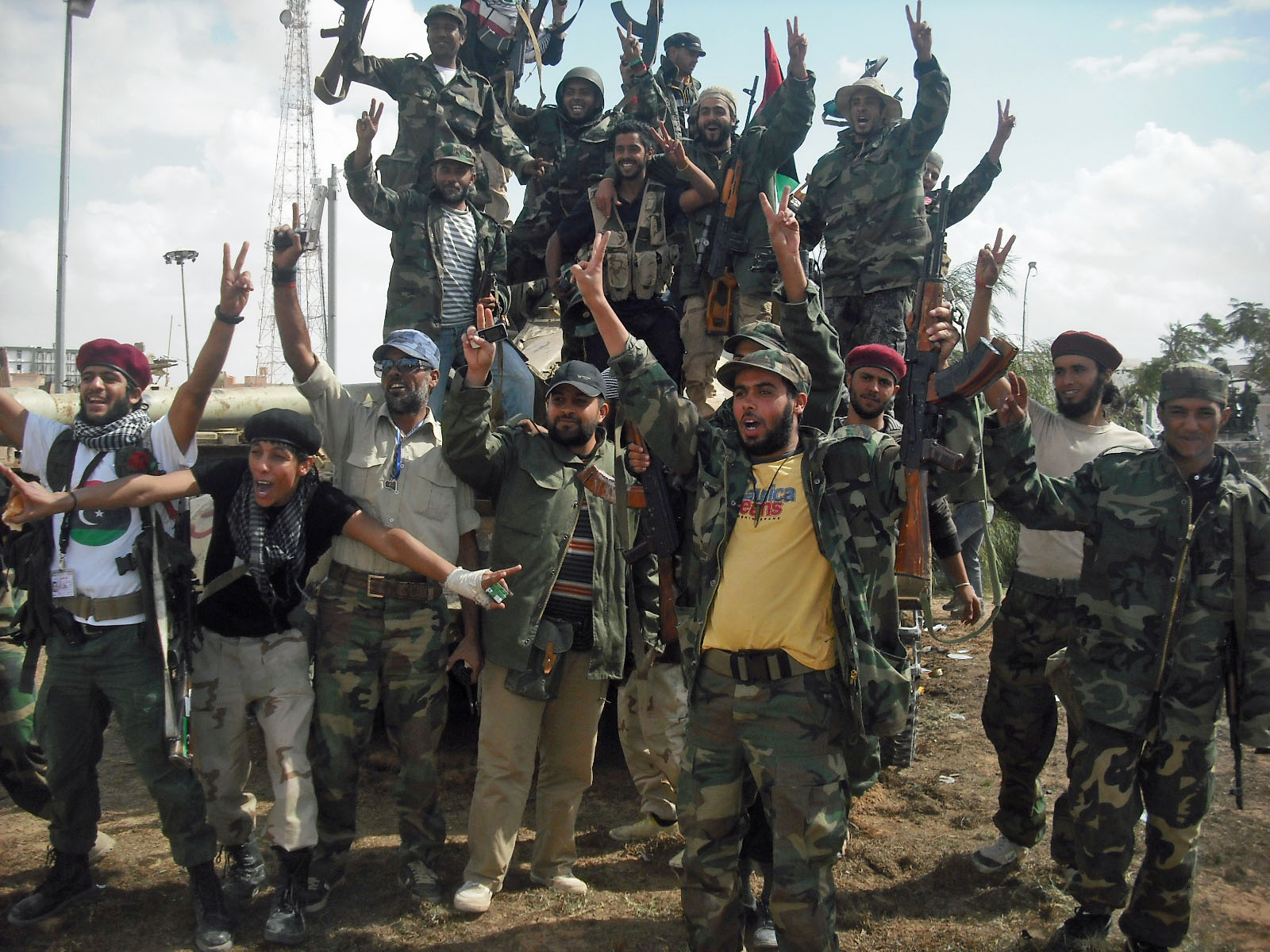
Libyan rebels after entering the town of Bani Walid.

The organizing among the anti-Gaddafi forces during the First Libyan Civil War was described as having used anarchic methods. These included decentralization, with the daily life of rebel-held territory largely being coordinated by the local councils that were established in various cities of Libya at the outbreak of the conflict, and prefigurative politics, with young volunteers self-organizing the solicitation of blood donations, establishment of food banks and the collection and distribution of basic necessities. The role of the Libyan People's Committees was praised by the Syrian anarchist Mazen Kamalmaz, who argued that they should form the foundation of a new direct democracy in Libya, rather than just acting during the transition to a new regime.

The Libyan anarchist Saoud Salem was among those that condemned the United Nations Security Council Resolution 1973, which sanctioned airstrikes against Libya, and rejected the prospect of foreign intervention by NATO states such as France, the United Kingdom and United States, demanding instead that the rebels be left to "finish the problem of Qaddafi by ourselves". This sentiment was echoed by foreign anarchists, who also condemned the NATO-led intervention in Libya, disputing its "humanitarian" characterization.

=== Madagascar ===
During the 1980s, the IMF imposed harsh austerity measures across Madagascar, leading to the withdrawal of police, soldiers and government bureaucrats from much of the Central Highlands region. When the anthropologist David Graeber visited the region, he described the formation of an anarchist community in Arivonimamo, where decisions were made via consensus, apparently leading to a very low crime rate.

=== Morocco ===
Anarchism in Morocco has its roots in the federalism practiced by Amazigh communities in pre-colonial Morocco. During the Spanish Civil War, Moroccan nationalists formed connections with Spanish anarchists in an attempt to ignite a war of national liberation against Spanish colonialism, but this effort was not successful. Despite the brief establishment of an anarchist movement in post-war Morocco, the movement was suppressed by the newly independent government, before finally re-emerging in the 21st century.

=== Mozambique ===
From the 1890s, the Kingdom of Portugal began to deport anarchists to jails in Portuguese Mozambique. One of these Portuguese anarchist prisoners was the print-worker José Estevam. Upon Estevam's release from prison in the early 1900s, he established the Revolutionary League (RL) in Lourenço Marques, which became the first known anarchist organization in the country. By the 1920s, an anarcho-syndicalist tendency had developed among Mozambican trade unions, which were allied with the General Confederation of Labour (CGT). Following the 28 May 1926 coup d'état in Portugal, the nascent Mozambican workers' movement was suppressed.

=== Nigeria ===
Anarchism in Nigeria has its roots in the organization of various stateless societies that inhabited pre-colonial Nigeria, particularly among the Igbo people. After the British colonization of Nigeria, revolutionary syndicalism became a key factor in the anti-colonial resistance, although the trade union movement deradicalized and took a more reformist approach following the country's independence. The contemporary Nigerian anarchist movement finally emerged from the left-wing opposition to the military dictatorship in the late 1980s and saw the creation of the anarcho-syndicalist Awareness League.

=== Senegal ===
In 1981, the socialist politician Abdou Diouf succeeded Léopold Sédar Senghor as President of Senegal, overseeing the country's transition to a multi-party system. This new environment of political pluralism brought anarchism into the public light, with Senegalese anarchists establishing the Anarchist Party for Individual Liberties in the Republic (PALIR) at a congress in Gorée, declaring their aim to establish a libertarian socialist society, based around the principles of decentralization, federalism, common ownership of the means of production, and direct democracy. The PALIR's conception of libertarian socialism took inspiration from the social formations of the Lebou and Balante peoples, who organized themselves without social classes or tribal chiefs. It is unknown what became of the PALIR in the ensuing years, due to the lack of studies on anarchism in Africa.

=== Sierra Leone ===
With the overthrow of the socialist First Republic of Sierra Leone in a coup d'état and the outbreak of the Sierra Leone Civil War, various competing factions began to vie for control of the country's diamond mining industry. The poor working conditions in the diamond fields eventually gave way to the rise of a Sierra Leonean branch of the Industrial Workers of the World (IWW). Led by Bright Chikezi, the IWW became particularly active among diamond miners, organizing up to 3,240 workers under their banner. They financed their activities through their mining work, while also receiving financial aid and literature from IWW branches in Britain. However, the effects of the civil war eventually came to a head in 1997, when the Armed Forces Revolutionary Council seized control of the country in a military coup and began looting from diamond workers, forcing many IWW militants into exile in Guinea, where they attempted to organize among Guinean miners. As a result of the coup, the international IWW lost contact with the local delegate in Sierra Leone.

=== South Africa ===
Anarchism dates back to the 1880s in South Africa, when the English anarchist immigrant Henry Glasse settled in Port Elizabeth in the then Cape Colony.

Swept up in the atmosphere created by what at the time appeared to be a victorious worker revolution in Russia in 1917, the revolutionary syndicalist International Socialist League (ISL) and the Industrial Socialist League (IndSL) dissolved into the Communist Party of South Africa (CPSA) at the latter's founding in 1921, providing many notable early figures until the Comintern ordered the expulsion of the syndicalist faction in the party. Unaligned syndicalists like Percy Fisher were active in the miners' 1922 Rand Rebellion, a general strike-turned-insurrection, and strongly opposed the racism of a large sector of the white strikers. The IWA meanwhile merged into the Industrial and Commercial Workers' Union (ICU) in 1920, one reason the ICU exhibited syndicalist influence.

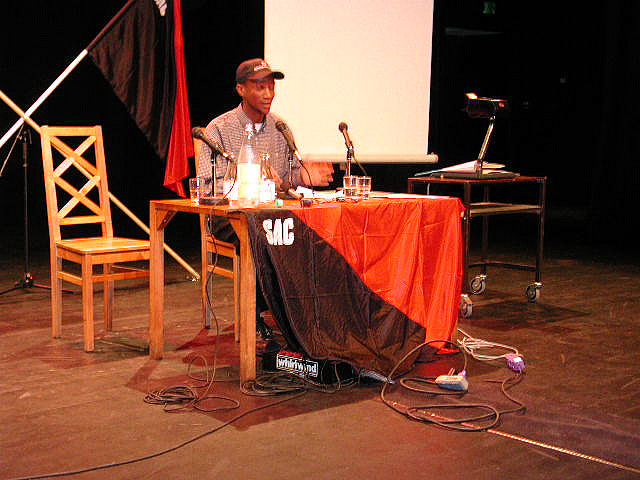
A ZACF activist speaking at an SAC-organised labour seminar in Sweden in 2005.

In 2003, the platformist Zabalaza Anarchist Communist Federation (ZACF, or ZabFed) was founded, drawing in the BMC and Zabalaza Books (whose Zabalaza journal became the journal of the ZACF) as well as a number of other collectives that had been set up in Soweto and Johannesburg, including a local chapter of the Anarchist Black Cross. In 2007, to strengthen its structures, ZabFed reconstituted itself as the Zabalaza Anarchist Communist Front (ZACF, or ZabFront). The new ZACF is a unitary "federation of individuals", as opposed to a federation of collectives like ZabFed, and has recently also come under the influence of especifismo, a tendency which originated within the Federación Anarquista Uruguaya (FAU, or Uruguayan Anarchist Federation). While committed to promoting syndicalism in the unions, ZACF work was in practice largely focused on the so-called "new social movements", formed in South Africa in response to the perceived failures of the African National Congress (ANC) government post-apartheid. The ZACF was involved in the campaigns of the Anti-Privatisation Forum (APF) and the Landless People's Movement (LPM). It has also been involved in solidarity work with Abahlali baseMjondolo and the Western Cape Anti-Eviction Campaign. In addition to such work, the ZACF is active in organising workshops and propaganda.

=== Sudan ===
Following the 1989 Sudanese coup d'état which brought Omar al-Bashir to power, a coalition of opposition groups formed the National Democratic Alliance (NDA), to coordinate resistance to the new government. In 2001, an NDA commander made contact with the South African Bikisha Media Collective and requested information on anarchist organization and tactics, to which the collective responded by directing them towards the theoretical works of platformism. The civil war was eventually ended in 2005 by the Comprehensive Peace Agreement, after which the NDA signed a deal with the government to cease hostilities. The peace deal and subsequent legalisation of opposition parties caused a fracture within the Sudanese Communist Party, leading certain far-left tendencies inspired by Maoism and libertarian communism to break away from the party. In the wake of the Sudanese Revolution that overthrew al-Bashir, anarchists in Khartoum that had participated in the resistance committees came together to form the "Sudanese Anarchists Gathering", an anti-authoritarian group that has raised anarchist flags at protests during the transition to democracy and following the military coup.

=== Tanzania ===
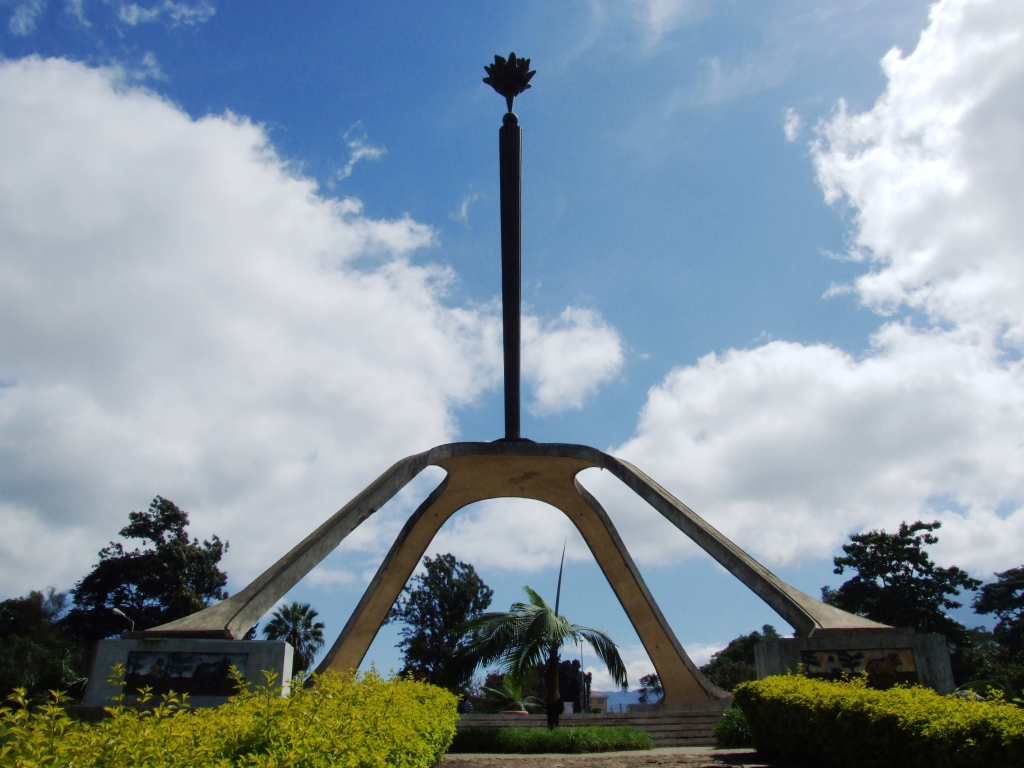
The Arusha Declaration Monument, erected in 1977 to memorialise Nyerere's declaration.

The African socialist program of Ujamaa, developed by the President of Tanzania Julius Nyerere following his Arusha Declaration, was described by the Nigerian anarchist Sam Mbah as "indisputably anarchistic in its logic and content." The Ujamaa village program encouraged peasants to organize self-governing communal societies, where the means of production and social produce were held in common. Although Nyere himself stated that "viable socialist communities can only be established with willing members," the Ujamaa program was eventually brought under state control and bureaucracy began to take over the previously self-governing communities. At the behest of the World Bank, the Tanzanian government began to set production quotas and enforced the sale of produce to the state at a fixed price. Mbah held that "corruption and bureaucracy are the two basic factors that led to the collapse of the Ujamaa system."

Workers' control was also practiced in several factories and hotels during a strike wave from 1972 to 1973 over anger at the ineffective workers committees, although the government of Julius Nyerere initially supported the factory takeovers, it later repressed them, with some analysts arguing it was a form of co-optation.

=== Tunisia ===
Anarchism in Tunisia has its roots in the works of the philosopher Ibn Khaldun, with the modern anarchist movement being first brought to the country in the late 19th century by Italian immigrants. The contemporary anarchist movement arose as a result of the Arab Spring and the aftermath of the Tunisian Revolution.

=== Uganda ===
Uganda was largely stateless until the rise of states, such as Kitara and Buganda, in the 13th century. Thereafter, stateless societies continued to exist within Uganda, particularly among the Lugbara people of the West Nile – a horticultural society made up of decentralized segments, without chiefs or monarchs.

=== Zambia ===
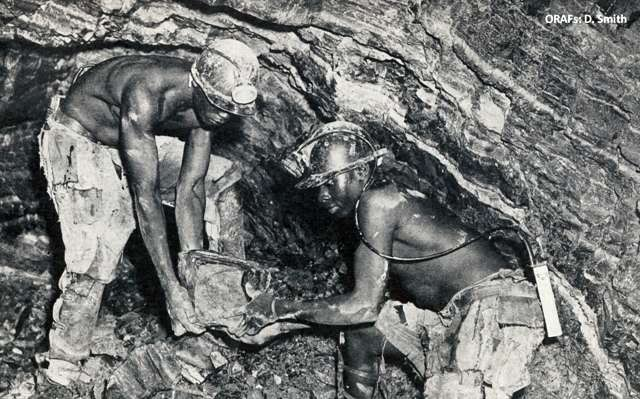
Zambian miners during the 1950s.

Following the colonization of areas north of the Zambezi river by the British South Africa Company, what is today Zambia was brought under the direct rule of the British Empire, establishing the protectorate of Northern Rhodesia. As a reaction to the introduction of British capitalism and the beginnings of a vast mining industry, workers in the region began to gravitate towards anarchist and syndicalist ideas, organizing the country's first trade unions. During the 1920s, the first wave of anarcho-syndicalism spread throughout much of Africa, with the South African Industrial and Commercial Workers' Union (ICU) even establishing a section in Northern Rhodesia, although the ICU ended up collapsing by the early 1930s. Nevertheless, trade union organizing persisted, with African mineworkers organizing the 1935 Copperbelt strike over poor safety standards and increased taxes. In 1940, miners in Northern Rhodesia went on strike again, using the leverage of their importance to the Allied effort in World War II to demand higher salaries.

In the mid-1990s, the anarchist Hamba Kahle Wilstar Choongo, who worked as a librarian at the University of Zambia (UNZA), began writing a series of articles in The Post that criticized the new Constitution of Zambia and argued instead for decentralization. Wilstar Choongo was himself inspired by the anti-authoritarian tendencies of his own tribe in Southern Zambia, which he described as a "flattened, chiefless hierarchy", and suggested these tendencies could help to advance anarchism in Zambia. Wilstar Choongo and a number of young members of the UNZA's Socialist Caucus moved towards anarchism, setting up the Anarchist Workers’ Solidarity Movement (AWSM) in 1998, which they considered affiliating with the South African Workers' Solidarity Federation (WSF). However, Wilstar died from malaria in 1999, at the age of 35, with the AWSM apparently collapsing in the wake of his death. In 2009, a former AWSM member Malele D Phiri reflected on the new institutional role of trade unions and NGOs in Zambia's civil organization, describing it as the "dialectical opposite" of the ruling structure established by ZANU-PF in Zimbabwe.

=== Zimbabwe ===
In the 1920s, the first wave of anarcho-syndicalism spread throughout much of Africa, with the South African Industrial and Commercial Workers' Union (ICU) even establishing a section in Southern Rhodesia. The Southern Rhodesian ICU developed a substantial rural base, responding to the question of land rights with the policy of a union ownership scheme, aiming to establish a "collective, de-colonised and decommodified working class and black ownership". Although the ICU dissolved in the early 1930s, the South Rhodesian section continued to operate as the Reformed Industrial Commercial Union until the 1950s, when the region was incorporated into the Central African Federation.

Following the Rhodesian Bush War, trade union activity rapidly increased, bringing with it an increase in strikes and industrial disputes, even against the wishes of ZANU-PF. The new government responded by breaking up the strikes, suppressing and taking over existing trade unions, revoking union control of wage negotiations and instituting the party appointment of union officials. From a merger of six trade union centres, ZANU-PF established the Zimbabwe Congress of Trade Unions (ZCTU), aiming to reduce industrial disputes and increase the influence that the government had over the trade union movement. But by 1987, unions again began to establish their independence from ZANU-PF, to which the government responded with police terror. The government even began to lose control over ZCTU, which increasingly criticized government policy surrounding trade unionism, eventually outright opposing the government due to its neoliberal economic policies, corruption and authoritarianism, going on to form an alliance of opposition groups which became the Movement for Democratic Change (MDC). However, the MDC soon strayed from its working class base, taking on a reformist and liberal-conservative party line, instituted by a middle class leadership. Dissilusionment with the MDC led to libertarian socialism emerging from the opposition movement, with some Zimbabwean anarchists establishing the Uhuru Network to organise amongst working class communities.

With the outbreak of the 2016–2017 Zimbabwe protests, Zimbabwean anarchists characterized the protest movement as representing a new society based on "solidarity, equality, grassroots democracy, free of all forms of oppression", identifying it with the anarchist approach to a bottom-up struggle against the state. In the wake of the 2017 Zimbabwean coup d'état, in which Emmerson Mnangagwa seized power from Robert Mugabe as part of a power struggle within ZANU-PF, Zimbabwean anarchists offered an anti-state perspective for the future of Zimbabwe, proposing mass action as a means to build libertarian socialism. There has since been movements to develop a specific anarchist organisation in Zimbabwe, in the hopes of forming a broad-based libertarian movement against the Zimbabwean state.

== Anarchist organisations in Africa ==
- International Socialist League (South Africa), 1915–1921
- Industrial Workers of Africa (South Africa), 1917–1920
- Industrial Socialist League (South Africa), 1918–1921
- Anarchist Party for Individual Liberties in the Republic (Senegal), 1981
- Awareness League (Nigeria), 1991–1999
- Anarchist Revolutionary Movement (South Africa), 1993–1995
- Workers' Solidarity Federation (Southern Africa), 1995–1999
- Anarchist Workers’ Solidarity Movement (Zambia), 1998–1999
- Bikisha Media Collective (South Africa), 1999–2007
- Zabalaza Books (South Africa), 1999–2007
- South African chapter of the Anarchist Black Cross, 2002–2007
- Zabalaza Anarchist Communist Federation (Southern Africa), 2003–2007
- Wiyathi Collective (Kenya), 2004
- Zabalaza Anarchist Communist Front (Southern Africa), 2007–present
- Black Flag (Egypt), 2010s–Present
- Libertarian Socialist Movement (Egypt), 2011–present
- Disobedience Movement (Tunisia), 2011–present
- Feminist Attack (Tunisia), 2011–present
- Horn Anarchists (Ethiopia), 2020–present
- Sudanese Anarchists Gathering (Sudan), 2020–present

== See also ==
- Black anarchism
- African socialism
- Politics of Africa
