= Nwodo =

- Gender: Male
- Language: Igbo

Origin
- Origin: Nigerian
- Meaning: child of peace
- Region of origin: South East, Nigeria

Nwodo is a Nigerian surname and it is a male name of Igbo origin. The name Nwodo is common among the Enugu (city) people of the Southeast, Nigeria. The name means “child of peace”.

== Notable individuals with the name ==
- Emmanuel Nwodo (born 1974), Nigerian boxer
- John Nnia Nwodo (born 1952), Nigerian lawyer and economist
- Okwesilieze Nwodo (born 1950), Nigerian politician
- Charles Nwodo Jr. (born 1962) Nigerian entrepreneur.
- Ajima Okechi Nwodo (born 1932), Nigerian Politician, Traditional Ruler
