= Emmanuel Iwuanyanwu =

Nigerian politician and businessman (1942–2024)

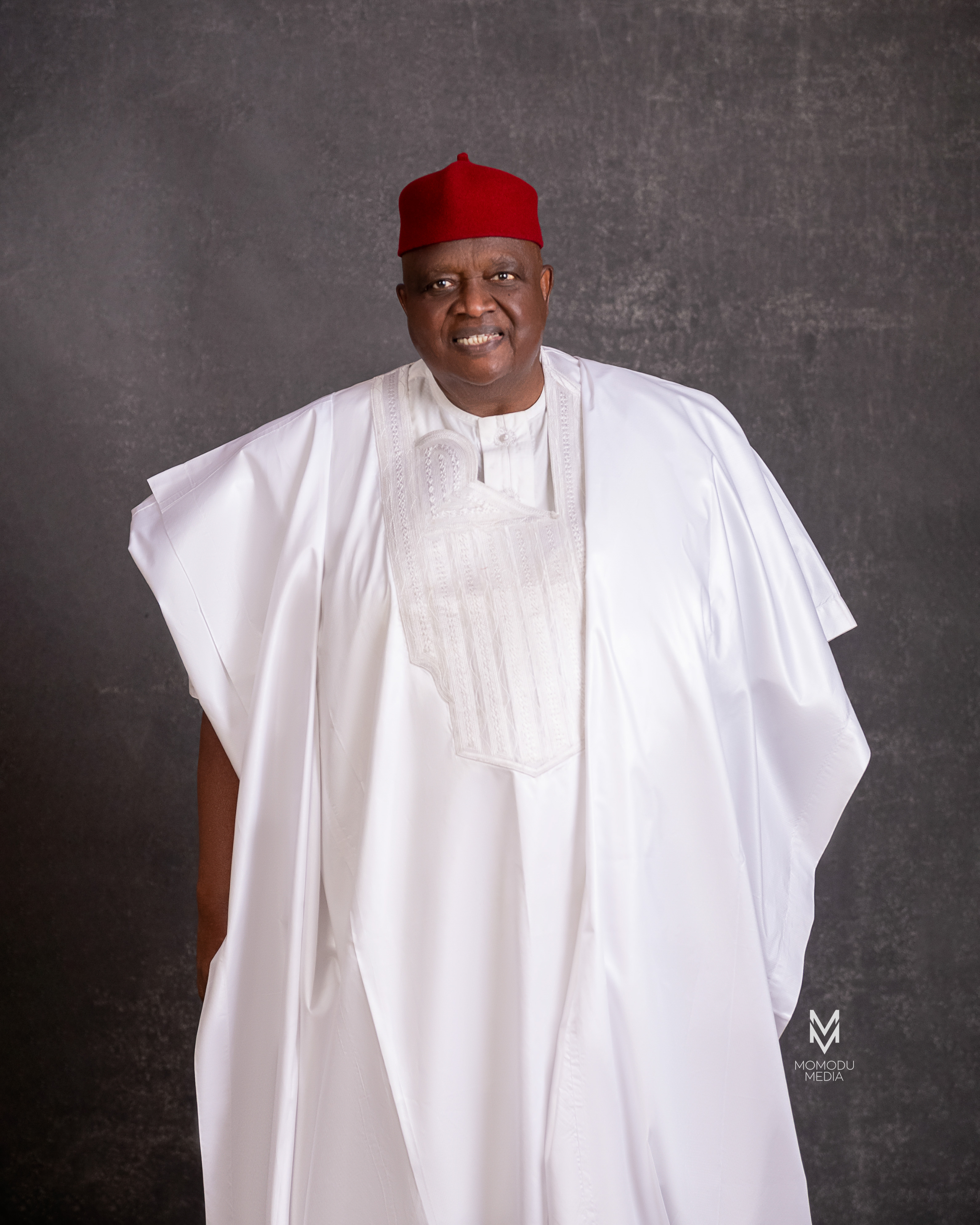
- Iwuanyanwu in 2022

11th President-General of Ọhanaeze Ndigbo

Ahaejiejemba Ndigbo
- In office 30 April 2023 – 25 July 2024
- Preceded by: George Obiozor
- Succeeded by: Fidelis Chukwu

Personal details
- Born: 4 September 1942 Ikeduru, Nigeria
- Died: 25 July 2024 (aged 81)
- Spouse: Eudora Nnenna Ozinyereaku (died 2011) Frances Chinonyerem Enwerem (2013)
- Occupation: Politician; businessman

Emmanuel Chukwuemeka Iwuanyanwu (listern; 4 September 1942 – 25 July 2024) was a Nigerian politician and businessman. He was considered one of the richest Igbo men in Nigeria. Iwuanyanwu was until his death the 11th president-general of Ọhanaeze Ndigbo; preceded by George Obiozor.

== Early life ==
Chief Emmanuel Iwuanyanwu was born on Friday, 4 September 1942 to Pa Bernard Iwuanyanwu and Madam Hulder Iwuanyanwu of Umuohii Atta in Ikeduru Local Government Area of Imo State of Nigeria. His grandfather, Iwuanyanwu, was a war commander who led native warriors into battle. Though born into a very humble family, Chief Iwuanyanwu emerged as a politician, businessman and philanthropist to be reckoned with in Nigeria.

He attended St. Patrick's School, Nkpokwu (later renamed Rukpokwu), Port Harcourt, for his Standard one to four, from 1948 to 1952. For his Standard five and six, he was transferred to Holy Trinity Primary School in Holy Trinity Church, Umuapara (later renamed Rumuapara, now in Obiakpo Local Government Area, Rivers State). This was from 1953 to 1954. From 1955 to 1959, he attended New Bethel College, Onitsha, Anambra State. In 1960, Emmanuel Iwuanyanwu, along with a select brilliant few, were offered admission into the Federal school of Science, Lagos, where he studied Pure and Applied Mathematics, Physics and Chemistry.

== Education ==
In 1963, he gained admission into the University of Nigeria, Nsukka where he studied Civil Engineering. Because of his notable feats in academics while in his early years in the university, Iwuanyanwu was awarded the prestigious German Academic Exchange Scholarship covering fees, boarding, holiday tickets and feeding, promptly facilitated by the Federal Republic of Germany. This award was for a few talented students of African descent.

== Military experience ==
The Nigerian Civil war fought from 1967 to 1970, interrupted Iwuanyanwu's studies. He was drafted into the Biafra Research and Production (RaP) Directorate headed by Professor Benjamin Chukwuka Nwosu, a nuclear physicist. Iwuanyanwu served in the Rocket Unit of RaP headed by Professor Gordian Ezekwe. With little access to armaments from the outside world, this group of researchers put on their thinking caps, including the nuclear physicist, Dr. Felix Oragwu, producing essential amenities and armaments, especially the dreaded Ogbunigwe. Desiring to see action, Iwuanyanwu later served as a soldier rising to captain of a unit of the secessionist forces of the breakaway Biafra and leading from the front at the war fronts. After treating a leg injury he sustained during the war, he was sent to study a course in advanced military intelligence at the Biafran School of Military Intelligence. After the course, he was transferred to the Biafran Combat Engineering Unit and appointed the Head of the Biafran Combat Engineering Military Intelligence. In this capacity, he worked directly under the office of the General Officer Commanding the Biafran Army, Major General Alexander Madiebo. Immediately after the Biafran war, Iwuanyanwu humanely volunteered to sweep the war-time mines for the Nigerian federal government. This was because he had all the intelligence maps as former Head of Biafran Combat Intelligence and he knew where the mines were.

== Engineering and business career ==
After the Nigerian civil war, Iwuanyanwu resumed studies at the University of Nigeria, Nsukka, graduating later in 1971. Iwuanyanwu worked as a pupil engineer at the Nigerian Construction and Furniture Company, rising to become site agent after he contrived a novel design for producing a barge with a composite section of empty engine oil drums. He became a registered engineer of the Council of Registered Engineers of Nigeria on 12 April 1972. As a seasoned Engineer, Iwuanyanwu experimented on flexible pavement and parameters for concrete, producing a mixed design of asphaltic concrete which was approved by the Nigerian Ministry of Works for use in the construction of airport runways and highways in Nigeria. In 1976, Emmanuel Iwuanyanwu began to work with two Americans, Messrs. Harper and Delano. The trio started a construction company whose name, Hardel, was coined from the name of the two foreigners. Iwuanyanwu later acquired the company from them and renamed it, Hardel and Enic Construction Company. His business grew into a conglomerate of over 20 companies, including Enic Advertising Ltd; Magil Industries Limited; National Post Newspapers; Sunrise Insurance Brokers; Oriental Shipping Lines Limited; Paradise City Hotel, Calabar and Oriental Airlines.

Chief Emmanuel Iwuanyanwu also owns the Daily Champion newspapers.

== Political career ==
=== First Attempt at Presidency ===
In June 1990, the then military president of Nigeria, General Ibrahim Babangida, lifted the ban he had placed on political activities. Chief Iwuanyanwu emerged the National Chairman of the unregistered Nigeria National Congress (NNC) which later fused into the National Republican Convention (NRC) party. He contested for the post of president of Nigeria under the NRC. Incidentally, General Ibrahim Babangida also lifted ban on old politicians of the first and second republics, and Adamu Ciroma entered the contest. He won in the NRC presidential primaries and the party decided that Emmanuel Iwuanyanwu would be his running mate. The NRC's rival party was the Social Democratic Party (SDP). Alhaji Shehu Musa Yar'Adua won in the SDP's presidential primaries. Unfortunately, allegations of widespread electoral malpractices by aspirants in the two parties were made to the government. Thus, on 6 October 1992, the presidential primaries of the political parties were suspended. On 16 October 1992, the Armed Forces Ruling Council (AFRC) nullified the suspended results of the party primaries and dissolved both the NRC and SDP party executives.

The nullification of results and dissolution of the parties' executives practically threw Chief Emmanuel Iwuanyanwu and other politicians out of the contest, creating room for Alhaji Bashir Tofa to emerge as the NRC's presidential candidate. After the presidential election on 12 June 1993, Moshood Abiola of the SDP won as president. The military president of Nigeria, General Ibrahim Babangida, annulled the elections, citing widespread irregularities, but no evidence of fraud was offered to the Nigerian public.

=== Second Attempt at Presidency ===
On 12 December 1995, the Nigerian military Government headed by General Sani Abacha, inaugurated a new eight-member National Electoral Commission of Nigeria (NECON). The next day, the Government set up a Transition Implementation Committee (TIC) to supervise the transition-to-civil rule process.

The National Congress of Nigeria (NCN) (which Chief Iwuanyanwu was instrumental to its creation) merged with some other associations such as the All Nigerian Congress (ANC), Committee of National Consensus (CNC); and Southern Solidarity Forum (SSF) to form the United Nigeria Congress (UNC). The UNC merged with the United Nigeria Party (UNP) to metamorphose into the United Nigeria Congress Party (UNCP). On 30 September 1996, NECON registered five political parties. These were: Committee for National Consensus (CNC), United Nigeria Congress Party (UNCP), National Centre Party of Nigeria (NCPN), Democratic Party of Nigeria (DPN), and Grassroots Democratic Movement (GDM). Aside Chief Iwuanyanwu, other prominent members of the UNCP were Dim C. Odumegwu Ojukwu and General Joseph Nanven Garba, who was the former President of the United Nations General Assembly. Emmanuel Iwuanyanwu was the Chairman of the Finance Committee and the Contact and Mobilization Committee of the UNCP. He began to run for presidency under the UNCP. As at July 1997, within the UNCP, only Chief Iwuanyanwu had indicated interest to vie for presidency. Other politicians were hesitant to show interest because of the fear that General Sani Abacha may have the intention of becoming a civilian president using the party. In the 469-member national legislative assembly elections that took place on 25 April 1998, the UNCP won more than 70 per cent of the seats. Its closest rival, the Democratic Party of Nigeria (DPN), won only 17 per cent of the seats. During the height of Chief Iwuanyanwu's presidential campaign, he flew on his private jet to the Republic of Chad to visit his political ally, the then Prime Minister of Chad, Koibla Djimastas. Upon his return, General Abacha considered arresting Chief Iwuanyanwu, on trumped-up allegation of plotting against his government, but Iwuanyanwu was later spared the arrest. On 21 December 1997, the government arrested top army officials including the Deputy Head of State, Lieutenant General Oladipo Diya, Major General Tunji Olanrewaju, Major General Abdulkarim Adisa, and eight others for allegedly plotting to "violently" overthrow the government of General Sani Abacha. The circumstances in the country and the strain in the relationship between Iwuanyanwu and Abacha made Iwuanyanwu to step down from running for the president. Chief Iwuanyanwu made public his decision to run for senate at a UNCP meeting in Owerri on Monday, 19 January 1998. By this time, other presidential aspirants who had stepped down were Dr. Olusola Saraki and Chief Donald Etiebet. In April 1998, four of the political parties had adopted Abacha as their sole presidential candidate.

Suspecting that General Abacha was planning to detain him as he had done to Diya and others, Iwuanyanwu quickly planned a covert journey to exile. The sudden death of General Abacha on 8 June 1998 and the coming to power of General Abdulsalami Abubakar ended Iwuanyanwu's complications.

=== Third Attempt at Presidency ===
On 11 August 1998, Abubakar inaugurated a 14-member Independent National Electoral Commission (INEC) headed by Justice Ephraim Akpata (rtd). Fourteen days later, INEC announced that the voters registration would be held from 5 to 19 October 1998; the Local Government elections would be held on 5 December 1998; Governorship/State House of Assembly, 9 January 1999; National Assembly elections, 20 February 1999, and Presidential elections, 27 February 1999. Chief Iwuanyanwu formed a political association known as the National Congress. This evolved into the United Nigeria People's Party (UNPP). He later led many members of the UNPP into the All People's Party (APP), a party which he was a founding member. Dim Odumegwu Ojukwu also led members of his People's Democratic Congress (PDC) into APP. This way, the APP became formidable enough to face the People's Democratic Party (PDP). The PDP was created from the G-9 (Dr. Alex Ekwueme, Chief Solomon Lar, Senator Francis Ellah, Alhaji Abubakar Rimi, Chief Bola Ige, Dr. Iyorcha Ayu, Prof. Jerry Gana, Alhaji Sule Lamido and Mallam Adamu Ciroma) which later metamorphosed into the G-18 and then the fearless G-34, which had earlier petitioned Gen. Sani Abacha, advising him not to succeed himself. By late November 1998, Iwuanyanwu was adopted as the APP's consensus presidential candidate for the south-east in the presence of Chief Francis Arthur Nzeribe; Dim Odumegwu Ojukwu; Prof. Godwin Odenigwe; Chief Gbazueagu Nweke Gbazueagu (aspiring to be governor of Enugu State); Dr. I.C. Madubuike; Chief Chris Nwankwo; Chief Max Nduaguibe; Prince Pat Abii (who was gunning to be governor of Imo State); Chief Martin Elechi; Chief Chekwas Okorie; Chief Jerry Okoro; Mrs. Joy Emordi (aspiring to be the first female governor of Anambra State); Chief M.C.K. Aguluchukwu and Chief Ken Nnamani. On Sunday, 14 February 1999, the APP primaries were held. Nine candidates were standing for the APP final nomination at this time. Amongst the presidential candidates who contested were Chief Harry Akande, Alhaji Umaru Shinkafi, Alhaji Bamanga Tukur, Chief Bode Olajumoke, Dr. Gamaliel Onosode; Chief Emmanuel Iwuanyanwu and Dr. Abubakar Olusola Saraki. Dr. Saraki had refused to accept the party's decision to zone the presidency only to southern candidates. Chief Ogbonnaya Onu, former governor of old Abia State also vied for the presidential ticket, against the general consensus of south-east politicians to differ to Iwuanyanwu. Chief Onu emerged as the presidential flagbearer for APP. With gubernatorial results indicating PDP as the dominant party, APP formed an alliance with the Alliance for Democracy (AD) and Onu was sidelined by his party because of powerful interests in West-North presidential and Vice Presidential tickets for both the PDP and the APP-AD. Thus, Chief Olu Falae of the AD emerged as the presidential flagbearer with Alhaji Umaru Shinkafi of the APP as his running mate. Olusegun Obasanjo emerged as the presidential flagbearer for the PDP, with Alhaji Atiku Abubakar as his running mate. During the elections, Iwuanyanwu supported Obasanjo with his political structure and this contributed to Obasanjo emerging as president of Nigeria in 1999.

=== As a Chieftain of the People's Democratic Party ===
In September 1999, the leaders of the APP in the South-east, including Chief Iwuanyanwu, Chief Vincent Ogbulafor and Mrs. Joy Emodi and their political associates, decamped to the PDP. Thousands of their supporters followed along. The then governor of Abia State, Dr. Orji Uzor Kalu, commended the action, describing it as strategic for the Igbo. Chief Iwuanyanwu supported the Obasanjo government. He declined from being a minister, successfully recommending acolytes to such a position. Nevertheless, he was also the Leader of the North-East Zone PDP Reconciliation/ Harmonization Team. He was until his death the oldest member of the Board of Trustees of the People's Democratic Party and coordinated the party's campaign for the South-East zone during the 2003 Presidential election. He was also a Member of the National Political Reform Conference in 2005.

=== Executive Membership and President-Generalcy of the Ohaneze Ndigbo Socio-Cultural Organization ===
Chief Iwuanyanwu became publicly involved in activities of the Ohanaeze Ndigbo, the apex socio-cultural organization of the Igbo as from 1988. The main objective of the Organization is to promote solidarity among its members for the sake of representing the political interests of the Igbo in Nigeria. It was the primal platform which launched his political career. He had served as chairman, Ohaneze Igbo Planning & Strategy Committee; chairman, Ohaneze Political Committee; chairman, Ohaneze Ndigbo State Creation Committee in 2006 and chairman, Ohaneze Ndigbo Council of Elders. As Chairman of the Ohaneze Council of elders, Chief Iwuanyanwu was vocal with issues concerning the welfare of the Igbo. On 20 April 2023, Chief Emmanuel Iwuanyanwu was announced as the President-General of the Ohanaeze Ndigbo worldwide. This was according to the "doctrine of necessity", which took effect when the National Executive Council of the Ohanaeze Ndigbo directed the people of Imo State to find a credible replacement for the past President-General of Ohanaeze Ndigbo, Ambassador Obiozor, who died in December 2022. Chief Iwuanyanwu was presented to Governor Hope Uzodinma of Imo State by the Imo State Council of Elders, led by Eze Ilomuanya, as “the consensus candidate” of the council to lead Ohanaeze Ndigbo worldwide.

After assuming office, Iwuanyanwu re-established a better working partnership with southeast governors of Nigeria, coordinated the attention of Igbo business tycoons in the affairs of Ohaneze Ndigbo, ended the crisis of leadership in the Ohaneze Ndigbo (United Kingdom and Ireland) and formally admitted into the Igbo fold, some African Americans who had provided evidence of authentic Igbo ancestry.

== Public service ==
Chief Iwuanyanwu held several political offices for the Nigerian government. He was the Founding Chairman, Raw Materials and Research Development Council (RMRDC), FCT, Abuja. He was also chairman, Nigerian Investment Promotion Commission (NIPC), Abuja. On 22 September 2005, he was appointed Chairman of the 20-man board of the Federal Road Maintenance Agency (FERMA). Chief Iwuanyanwu also served as the Founding Chairman, Nigerian National Lottery, chairman, National Productivity Merit Award, Federal Republic of Nigeria, and one-time Chairman of the National Orthopedic Hospital, Igbobi, Lagos.

== Philanthropy and sport ==
Chief Emmanuel Iwuanyanwu founded the Iwuanyanwu Nationale Football Club (now Heartland F.C.), which won several national and international championships. He was the chairman, National Sports Development Fund, and, chairman, Nigerian Football Association USA “94” and Cup of Nations Fund Raising Committee. In a statement by its National Publicity Secretary, Alex Ogbonnia, Ohanaeze Ndigbo said: “There was a time in history, Iwuanyanwu was the highest employer of labour, at least in the entire East of the Niger. The Iwuanyanwu Foundation has offered scholarships to over 10,000 indigent students across the country. He donated to universities to create conducive environments for learning; built churches and other community facilities. Over 40 years ago, Sam Mbakwe, the former governor of Old Imo State conceived the idea of an International Cargo Airport at Owerri, it was Iwuanyanwu who made the highest donation of $2 million. In politics, he produced several chairmen of local governments, commissioners, senators, ministers and governors most of whom are still alive."

On 21 December 1980, Chief Iwuanyanwu built and handed over to the University of Nigeria, the Hulder Iwuanyanwu Children's Library. He built and donated for public service, the Hulder Iwuanyanwu Orphanage Home at Atta, Ikeduru in Imo State. There is also the Iwuanyanwu National Ambulance which caters for accident victims all over Nigeria. He donated the Iwuanyanwu Blood Transfusion Centre at Federal Medical Centre, Owerri, Imo State, in 1985.

Private donations made by Iwuanyanwu in book presentations, weddings, birthday ceremonies and many other events are incalculable as there is no comprehensive inventory of such philanthropy aside attempts published in books and newspapers, especially one in his authorized biography. An example of a private donation was demonstrated during the book presentation of the biography of Prof. Pius Nwankwo Okeke.

== Personal life ==
=== Family ===
Chief Iwuanyanwu's wife of more than 40 years, Lady Eudora Nnenna Ozinyereaku Iwuanyanwu, with whom he had three sons and five daughters, died on 28 August 2011, at the age of 63. Announcing her death, Chief Iwuanyanwu said: "As a Patron of Cancer Society, she had recently expressed great concern over the large number of deaths due to prostate cancer and all other kinds of cancer. At a recent family meeting, she convinced me to build and donate to Nigeria Ten (10) Cancer Screening and Treatment Centres, one in each of the Six Geo-Political Zones, and one in each of the 5 South-Eastern States. This was scheduled to be announced on 4 September 2011. She died a week before." Chief Emmanuel Iwuanyanwu married Frances Chinonyerem (née Enwerem) on 14 September 2013.

=== Death ===
On 25 July 2024, Chief Iwuanyanwu died following a brief illness. He was 81.

=== Written biography ===
Two volumes of the Biography of Chief Iwuanyanwu was authored by Jeff Unaegbu, Sam Chukwu and Chinedu Nsofor in 2022. Copies of the book were presented during Chief Iwuanyanwu's 80th birthday on 4 September 2022.

== Honours ==
=== National honours ===
- Nigeria:
  - Commander of the Order of the Federal Republic (CFR)
  - Officer of the Order of the Federal Republic (OFR)
  - Member of the Order of the Federal Republic (MFR)

=== Academic Honours ===
Doctor of Engineering Science, Morgan State University, Baltimore, Maryland, 1983

Doctor of Laws, Shaw University, Raleigh, North Carolina;

Doctor of Science (PhD), University of Jos, 1989;

Doctor of Science, University of Calabar, 1990.
