= List of civil societies in Nigeria =

There are six Geopolitical zones in Nigeria and about 250 ethnic groups with over 521 languages. However, the Constitution of Nigeria as amended in 1999 permits freedom of assembly, associations and civil societies irrespective of the geopolitical zones, ethnic groups and languages. Civil societies plays a key role in the nation's development and growth.

Below is a list of notable civil societies in Nigeria:

- Oodua Peoples Congress
- Arewa People's Congress
- Ohanaeze Ndigbo
- Pan Niger Delta Forum, PANDEF
- Movement for the Emancipation of the Niger Delta
- Nigeria Labour Congress
- Red Cross Society
- Boy Scouts of Nigeria
- Girl Scouts of Nigeria
- Academic Staff Union of Universities (ASUU)
- AWACIO - Aids for Women, Adolescents and Children International Organization

== See also ==
- Law of Nigeria
