= Sam Mbah =

Nigerian writer (1963–2014)

Sam Mbah (1963 – 6 November 2014) was a Nigerian author, lawyer, activist, and anarchist. He is notable for his 1997 work African Anarchism: The History of a Movement co-authored with I.E. Igariwey.

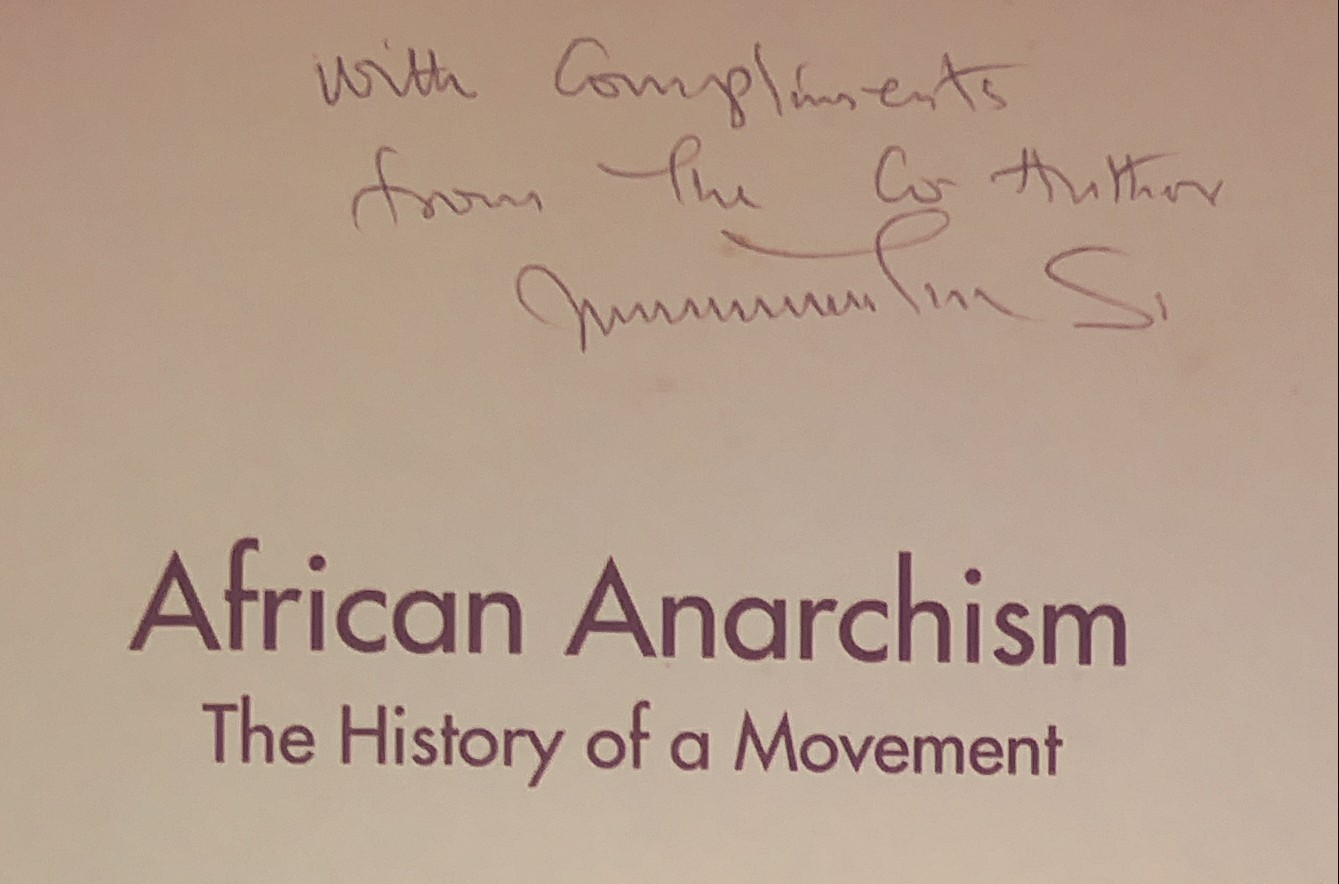
A copy of African Anarchism inscribed by Sam Mbah: "With Compliments from the Co Author"

== Biography ==
Mbah was born in 1963 in Enugu, Nigeria. He was active in the Awareness League. Mbah wrote about politics, the environment, anthropology, and anarchism. He studied at the University of Lagos and lived in Enugu, in south-eastern Nigeria.

His health deteriorated in early 2014 due to a heart condition. By autumn, he seemed to be recovering, but in early November a crisis arose and he was rushed to a hospital, where he died on 6 November 2014, from complications arising from his heart condition.

== Philosophy ==
Mbah was an active campaigner for human and environmental rights and against corruption.

As his closing words in a 2012 interview, Mbah shared this message to the world:

I want to say a few words to our anarchist friends and groups that in the past associated with us, supported us, in one way or another, especially from Europe and North America. I say to them that anarchism is not dead in Africa. But it is important for them to appreciate that anarchism as a movement, as a political movement, as an ideological platform, is still going to take some time to crystallize here. But in the mean time, we must continue to engage with the rest of the society. We must continue to interrogate the government in debates where we can achieve. . . . It is difficult in this part of the world to begin to build a movement based on anarchist principles alone. But we can build a movement based on trying to hold the government accountable, trying to fight for the environment, trying to fight for gender equality, trying to fight for human rights. Because these are minimum principles on which a broad swathe of the population agree, and it makes sense for us to continue to interact and interrogate social existence and public policy on this basis. And seek to ensure that civil society is not extinguished completely. While also those of us who genuinely believe in anarchism will continue to organise and develop tools of organisation that will some day lead to the emergence of an anarchist movement.

== Bibliography ==
- African Anarchism: The History of a Movement, with I.E. Igariwey, See Sharp Press, Tucson, Arizona, 1997. ISBN 978-1-884365-05-8.

== See also ==
- Anarchism in Africa
- Anarchism in Nigeria
