= Okwesilieze Nwodo =

Nigerian politician

Okwesilieze Emmanuel Nwodo
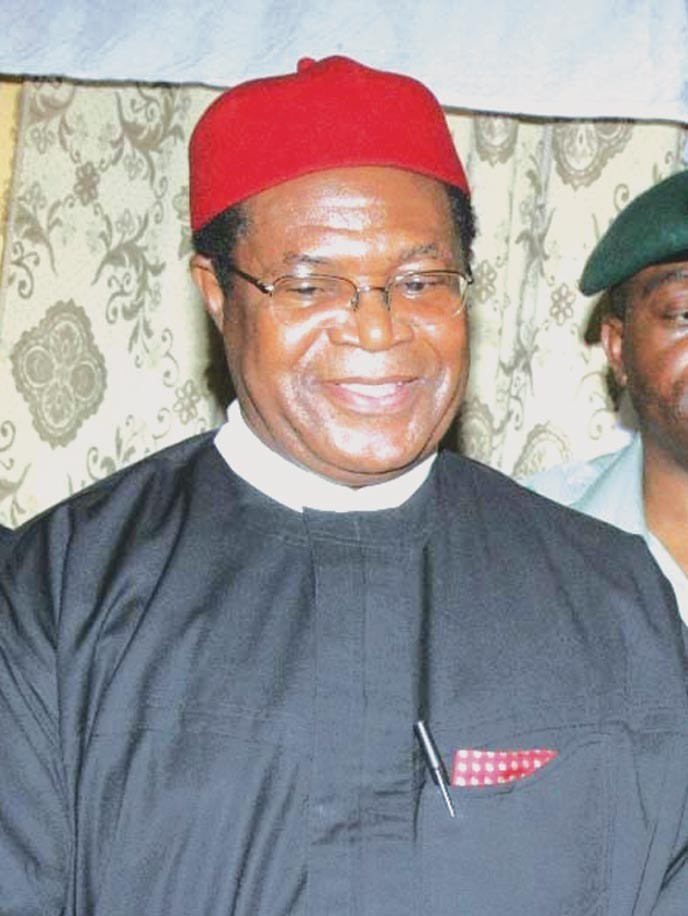

2nd Governor of Enugu State
- In office January 1992 – November 1993
- Preceded by: Herbert Eze
- Succeeded by: Temi Ejoor

Personal details
- Born: 28 July 1950 (age 75) Nsukka, Nigeria
- Party: Peoples Democratic Party

Okwesilieze Nwodo // (Okwy) (born 28 July 1950 in Nsukka, Nigeria) is a Nigerian politician who was elected Governor of Enugu State in January 1992 during the Third Nigerian Republic.

Later he became the national secretary, national chairman, and a senior politician in the Peoples Democratic Party (PDP).

== Biography ==
Dr. Okwesilieze is a member of the Nwodo political dynasty. He is the second son of Igwe J.U. Nwodo, a traditional ruler who hailed from Ukehe, in Enugu State. J.U. was appointed Minister of Commerce in the former Eastern Region under Premier Michael Okpara, and was subsequently Minister of Local Government. Nwodo studied medicine at the University of Nigeria, Nsukka (1971–77). Between 1977 and 1980, he was a house officer at the University of Nigeria Teaching Hospital in Enugu and at the Military Hospital in Jos.

He continued his studies at the Royal College of Surgeons, London (1980) and the Belgrade Medical School, Yugoslavia (1980–84), gaining an MB.BS in Medicine and Surgery.

He worked as a pediatric surgeon in Yugoslavia and then in Birmingham, England, before returning to Nigeria and taking a post as Medical Doctor at the Ukehe Medical Centre and Maternity (1984-1991).

Nwodo was elected Governor of Enugu State in January 1992 on the NRC platform during the Third Nigerian Republic.

He held office until November 1993, when General Sani Abacha came to power in a military coup.

He was twice elected Secretary General of People's Democratic Party (PDP) in 1999-2001.

In October 2001, he was replaced by Vincent Ogbulafor as PDP party secretary.

He fell out with Enugu State governor Chimaroke Nnamani in 2002.

In December 2003, the Independent Corrupt Practices and Other Related Offences Commission announced that it was investigating Nwodo and others in connection with a multi-billion naira bribery scandal related to the National Identity Card scheme.

In 2007, he was awarded a National Honour, Commander of the Order of the Niger (CON), by President Shehu Yar'Adua.

In 2010, he was elected National Chairman of the Peoples Democratic Party.

In 2010, he was cleared of all charges on the Identity Card scandal.

In 2014, The Beta Sigma Fraternity International elected Dr Okwesilieze Nwodo, former Governor of Enugu State, as its President for the next two years.

In his acceptance speech, Nwodo, enjoined all members to live up to the high ideals for which the Beta Sigma was formed in Nigeria.

He stated that "at a time when our society is plagued by socio-economic problems and security challenges, members should extend hand of fellowship to the less-privileged and the poor in our communities."

== Personal life ==
He is a brother to Chief John Nnia Nwodo, who was Minister of Aviation under President Shehu Shagari, and again Minister of Information under President Abdusalami Abubakar. Chief John Nwodo was the 9th President-General of the Ohanaeze Ndigbo. Dr. Okwesilieze is also a brother to Dr. Joseph Nwodo, a Presidential Candidate in 1993 Nigerian presidential election. His sister is Dr. Valeria Azinge (SAN).
