= Obiozor =

Obiozor is a surname. Notable people with the surname include:

- Christian Obiozor (born 1994), Nigerian footballer
- Cyril Obiozor (born 1986), American football player
- George Obiozor (1942–2022), Nigerian professor and diplomat
