= George Obiozor =

Nigerian politician (1942–2022)

George Obiozor CON
- Preceded by: John Nnia Nwodo
- Succeeded by: Emmanuel Iwuanyanwu

Nigerian Ambassador to United States
- In office 2004–2008

10th President-General of Ọhaneze Ndigbo
- In office 2020–2022

Personal details
- Born: 15 August 1942 Imo State, British Nigeria
- Died: 26 December 2022 (aged 80) Nigeria
- Education: Awo-Omamma Comprehensive Secondary School
- Alma mater: University of Puget Sound; Columbia University

George Achulike Obiozor (15 August 1942 – 26 December 2022) was a Nigerian professor and diplomat. Obiozor was the Nigerian Ambassador to the United States. He was the 10th president-general of Ọhaneze Ndigbo; succeeded by Emmanuel Iwuanyanwu.

== Early life and education ==
Obiozor was born on 15 August 1942. He attended Awo-Omamma Comprehensive Secondary School from 1959 to 1963. He studied at the Institute of African Studies, and Albert Schweitzer College. He graduated from the University of Puget Sound in 1969, and from Columbia University with a Ph.D. in International Affairs.

== Career ==
Obiozor was director-general of the Nigerian Institute of International Affairs. He later became the High Commissioner to Cyprus, before becoming ambassador to Israel, from 1999 to 2003, then ambassador to the United States, from 2004 to 2008.

Obiozor was elected as the President General of Ohaneze ndi Igbo on 9 January 2021, a socio-cultural group was formed to cater for the welfare of the Igbo nation from Nigeria.

== Works ==
- Uneasy Friendships: Nigeria-United States Relations, Fourth Dimension Pub. Co., 1992, ISBN 978-978-156-318-8
- The politics of precarious balancing: an analysis of contending issues in Nigerian domestic and foreign policy, Nigerian Institute of International Affairs, 1994, ISBN 978-978-002-026-2
- Nigeria and the World: Managing the Politics of Diplomatic Ambivalence in a Changing World. Panatlantic Books, Centre for Human Security. ISBN 978-1-890091-53-8

== Quotes ==
- "Politics is a concentric series of conspiracies in which the last party to conspire emerges victorious".

== Personal life and death ==
George Obiozor died on 26 December 2022, at the age of 80. He survived by his three children.
