= Frederick Fasehun =

Frederick Isiotan Fasehun (Yoruba: Frederick Ìsìòtán Fáàséhùn; 21 September 1935 – 1 December 2018) was a Nigerian medical doctor, hotel owner and leader of the Oodua Peoples Congress (OPC).

== Education and medical career ==
He studied science at Blackburn College and furthered his education at Aberdeen University College of Medicine. He also studied at the Liverpool Postgraduate School after which he had a Fellowship at the Royal College of Surgeons. In 1976, he studied acupuncture in China under a joint World Health Organization and United Nations Development Scholarship Program.

== Politics ==
In 1977, he set up an Acupuncture Unit at the Lagos University Teaching Hospital. He resigned in 1978 and immediately set up the Besthope Hospital and Acupuncture Centre in Lagos. The Acupuncture Centre once earned a reputation as Africa's first for the Chinese medical practice.

The OPC is Yoruba-based organization formed to actualize the annulled mandate of Chief Moshood Kashimawo Olawale Abiola, a Yoruba who won the presidential election of 12 June 1993 but was barred from office. Fasehun was imprisoned for 19 months from December 1996 to June 1998 during the military rule of Sani Abacha, only ending 18 days after Abacha's death.

He died in the intensive care unit of Lagos State University Teaching Hospital, Ikeja, Lagos.

== Death ==
He died on 1 December 2018.
