= Daily Champion =

Nigeria English language newspaper

- Type: Daily newspaper
- Publisher: Emmanuel Iwuanyanwu
- Language: English
- Headquarters: Lagos
- Website: http://www.championnews.com.ng/

The Daily Champion is an English-language newspaper in Nigeria. The Champion is privately owned, and is published in Lagos. By March 2011 the Executive Chairman and publisher of Champion Newspapers was Chief Emmanuel Iwuanyanwu. Iwuanyanwu is one of the wealthiest of Igbo people.

According to Iyara Esu, Vice-Chancellor of the University of Calabar, the Daily Champion is "the major paper we have east of the Niger, a paper that is indigenous to our people, that is the voice of people, this part of the country". The Daily Champion covers a wide variety of news, sports, business and community events. The typical article cites two or more sources, slightly higher than the average for Nigerian newspapers, but the newspaper relies more heavily on government and business sources than others, often reporting what the source has said with little analysis or criticism. Compared to other papers, the Daily Champion tends to report more positively on the oil industry.

The newspaper is usually cautious in its coverage of issues, and does not stray far from the government line.
