= Arewa People's Congress =

Northern muslim party Nigeria

The Arewa People's Congress (APC) is a group in Northern Nigeria established to protect the interests of the people of Northern extraction. It has been described as a militant wing of the Arewa Consultative Forum. The group was formally launched on 13 December 1999. It was chaired by a retired army officer, Captain Sagir Muhammed, who had been an operative in the Directorate of Military Intelligence. The APC has a motto "to preserve the indivisibility of the country". The group said it would begin full self-defence training for northern residents in reaction to attacks on Hausas by the Oodua Peoples Congress (OPC), a Yoruba pressure group in the south.

The emergence of increasingly militant groups such as the APC and OPC is one of the factors fuelling communal violence in Nigeria. The Oodua People's Congress secretary general, Kayode Ogundamisi, has blamed the APC for the ethnic violence. In January 2000 the Inspector General of police, Musiliu Smith, announced a reward of N100,000 for Gani Adams, leader of the militant youth wing of the OPC. The APC promptly raised the ransom to N300,000.

Speaking to the Conference of Southern Governors in January 2001, Chimaroke Nnamani, the governor of Enugu State, said the emergence of these groups was due to the inability of the federal police to provide adequate policing due to shortage of manpower.

In November 2006 Sagir Muhammed described the impeachment of Plateau State Governor Chibi Joshua Dariye as an affront.
