= Oodua Peoples Congress =

Nationalist movement in Nigeria

The Oodua Peoples Congress (OPC) is a Yoruba nationalist, regionalist, and vigilante organization in Nigeria. It is also known as the Oodua Liberation Movement (OLM) or the Revolutionary Council of Nigeria. It is based in southwestern Nigeria and has grassroots support within the Yoruba ethnic community.

== History ==
The Oodua Peoples Congress was formed by a group of Yoruba elites and artisans which included Dr. Fredrick Fasehun (founder and its first national leader).

They decided to form an organization to actualize the annulled mandate of Chief Moshood Kashimawo Olawale Abiola, a Yoruba who most people believed to be on his way to winning the presidential election of 12 June 1993, which was subsequently annulled by the military government before vote tallying was complete.

Although the founding president of the OPC was Frederick Fasehun, in 1999 a faction led by Gani Adams broke off from the main organization, but continued usage of the main party's name. Until his death in 2018, Fasehun was widely held by the Yoruba to be the leader of the OPC. He bestowed Ganiu Adams with the title of the National Coordinator in other to bring the factions under one body, while he remained its president and founding father. In December 1999, the newly formed Arewa People's Congress said it would begin full self-defense training for northern residents in reaction to attacks on Hausas by the OPC. After Fasehun's death, Oodua People's Congress the factions continued and the Fasheun faction elected a new leader, Prince Oshibote. This was in line with Fasehun's wishes before he died.

== See also ==
- Ohanaeze Ndigbo
- Chief John Nnia Nwodo
