= Babangida =

Babangida is a Nigerian surname. Notable people with the surname include:

- Ibrahim Babangida, former military ruler of Nigeria
- Maryam Babangida, former first lady of Nigeria
- Three footballer brothers
  - Tijani Babangida (born 1973), Nigerian footballer
  - Ibrahim Babangida (footballer) (1976–2024), Nigerian footballer
  - Haruna Babangida (born 1982), Nigerian footballer
