= Frank Kokori =

Nigerian political activist

Frank Ovie Kokori

SDP national financial secretary

Personal details
- Born: 7 December 1944 Kokori, Nigeria
- Died: 7 December 2023 (aged 79) Warri, Nigeria
- Citizenship: Nigeria
- Party: SDP
- Education: University of Ibadan

Frank Ovie Kokori (1944–2023) was the secretary general of National Union of Petroleum and Natural Gas Workers of Nigeria. He was also a Social Democratic Party national financial secretary.

== Early life and education ==
Kokori was born on 7 December 1944 in Kokori, Delta State. He attended Urhobo college in Efferun, Uvwie from 1959-1962 and Eko boys high school until 1964 at Lagos. He also acquired his degree at university of Ibadan and the institute of social studies in The Hague, Netherlands. Kokori worked as a tariff clerk at the Electricity Corporation of Nigeria and as a district sales representative at Lever Brothers Nigeria Ltd. He was appointed general secretary of the National Union of Nigeria Bank Employees, which he held for three years before he became the national secretary of the National Union of Petroleum and Natural Gas Workers (NUPENG).

== Political life ==
Frank Kokori was a democrat, activist and a union leader. He also fought for the 12 June presidential election.

== Death ==
Kokori died in Warri, Nigeria on 7 December 2023 from kidney related diseases.
