= Augusto Masetti =

Italian anarchist (1888–1966)

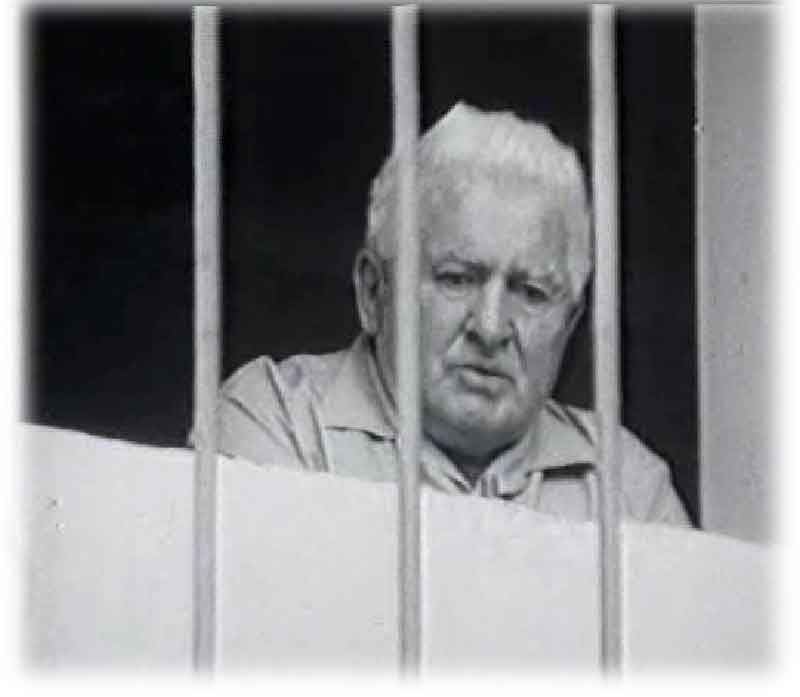
- Born: April 12, 1888; Sala Bolognese, Italy
- Died: March 1966 (aged 77); Imola, Italy

Augusto Masetti (1888–1966) was an Italian anarchist known for an incident at the beginning of the Italo-Turkish War in which he shot his army commanding officer. A military court put him in an insane asylum, a move likely to have avoided creating a cause célèbre in Masetti during an unpopular war had he instead received the expected sentence of death by firing squad. Leftists waged a campaign to free Masetti.

== Bibliography ==
- Jensen, Richard Bach (2014). The Battle Against Anarchist Terrorism: An International History, 1878–1934. Cambridge: Cambridge University Press. ISBN 978-1-107-03405-1.
- Tarozzi, Fiorenza (2004). "MASETTI, Augusto". Dizionario biografico online degli anarchici italiani (in Italian).
