= Iduma Igariwey Enwo =

Nigerian lawyer and politician

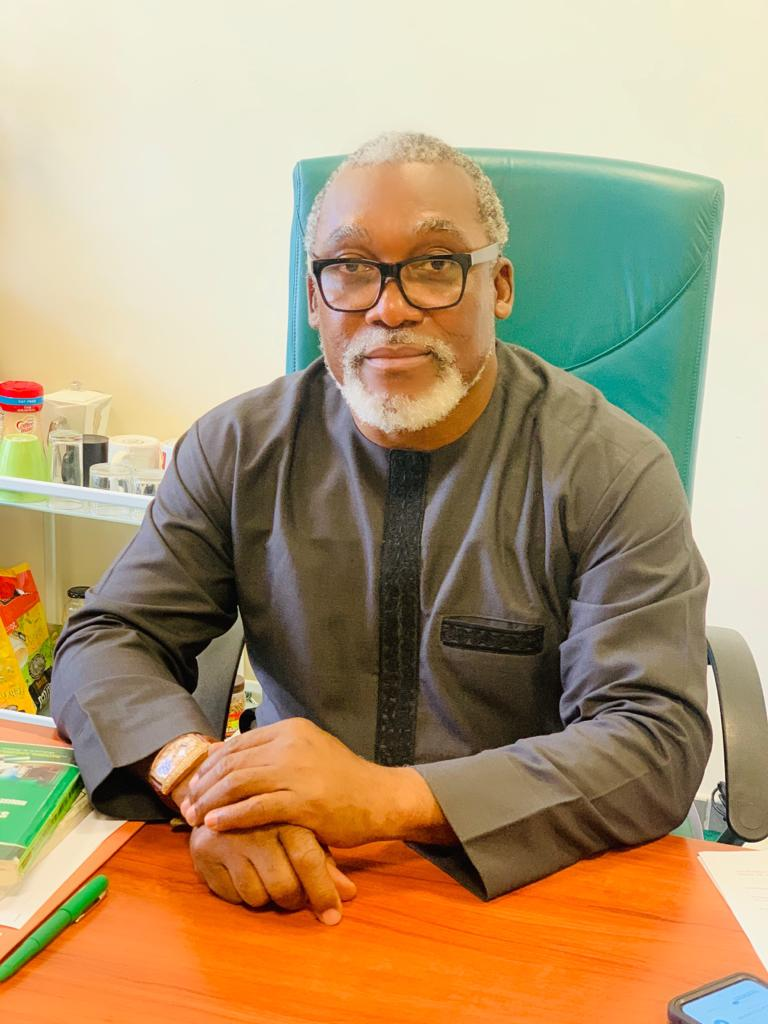

Member of House of Representatives of Nigeria
- Incumbent
- Assumed office 2015
- President: Muhammadu Buhari (2015–2023); Bola Tinubu (2023–present)
- Constituency: Afikpo

Personal details
- Born: 5 September 1961 (age 65)
- Party: Peoples Democratic Party
- Website: idumaigariwey.com

Iduma Igariwey Enwo (born 5 September 1961), also known as Gary Igariwey and I.E. Igariwey is a Nigerian lawyer and politician. He is a current member of the House of Representatives (9th assembly), representing Afikpo North/Afikpo South federal constituency. He served as the 8th president-general of Ọhanaeze Ndigbo; succeeded by Nnia Nwodo.

== Anarchism ==
In the late 1990s he came to identify with anarcho-syndicalism. In 1997 he and Sam Mbah wrote the book African Anarchism: The History of a Movement.
