= Gani Adams =

Nigerian social activist

Chief Gani Adams
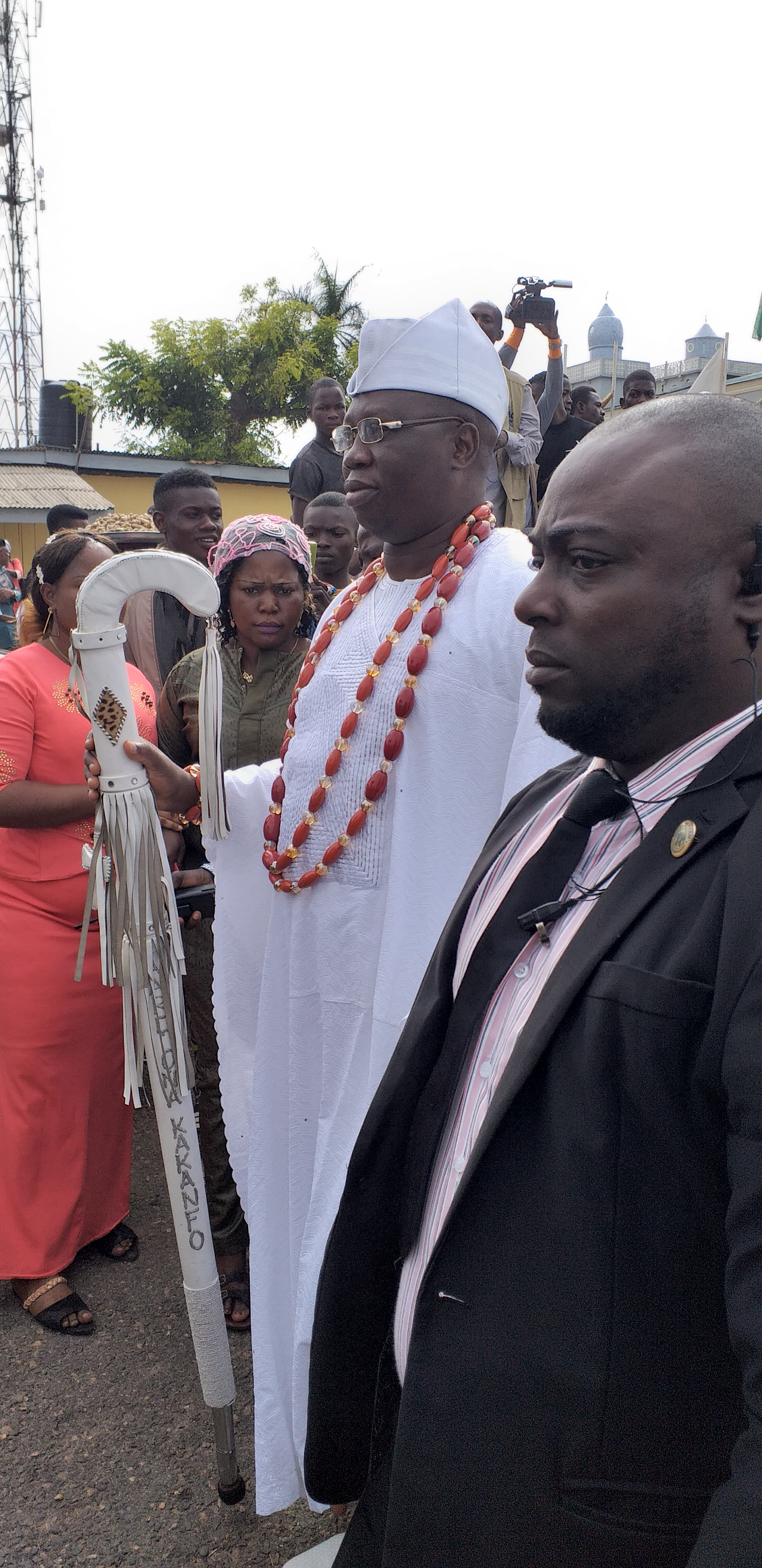
- Aare Ona Kakanfo
- Born: Ganiyu Adams; April 30, 1970 (age 56); Arigidi-Akoko, Akoko North-West, Ondo State
- Education: Lagos State University
- Occupations: Social activist, politician
- Years active: 1992–present
- Organization: Olokun Festival Foundation
- Movement: Oodua Peoples Congress

Chief Ganiyu Adams, popularly known as Gani Adams (born April 30, 1970), is a Nigerian activist, politician, traditional aristocrat and the 15th Aare Ona Kakanfo of Yoruba land.

== Early life ==
Gani Adams was born on April 30, 1970, at Arigidi-Akoko, presently known as Akoko north-west local government area of Ondo state.

== Education ==
Gani Adams began his educational career at Army children's school in Otukpo, Benue state. But because of the nature of his father's job, they moved to lagos where he completed his primary education at Municipal Primary school in Surulere area of Lagos State in 1980. After his primary education, he proceeded to Ansar-Ud-deen Secondary School at Randle Avenue, Surulere. After his secondary education, he later went to train in furniture-making and interior decoration, which he completed in 1987.

== Career ==
Adams thought of what he could venture into that will earn him money to cater for all of his needs. He joined Stabilini Visinoni Limited, an Italian construction firm based in Apapa in Lagos, as an interior decorator. He later resigned from the company to establish his own interior business which he named “Gadson interiors”.

The journey of Gani Adams as a democrat and activist started right from his early age. In 1992, he became an active pro-democrat by campaigning for democracy due to his struggle to avert military rule in the country and to make individual participation in democratic governance come into being.

The struggle however, fetched him an appointment as the Public Relations Officer of Mushin local government chapter of Civil Liberties Organization(CLO) in 1993; a group that pursues the promotion of fundamental human rights in Nigeria. He was also a functioning member of Oodua Youth Movement (OYM) and a founding member of the Oodua Peoples' Congress in 1994. He was the first National Deputy Coordinator and the current Coordinator of Oodua Peoples Congress. Gani was the leader of a faction of the Oodua Peoples Congress, a nationalist organisation based in Nigeria which supports an autonomous state for the Yoruba people.

Oodua Peoples Congress was formed in 1994 as a socio-cultural group to promote the Yoruba people and their culture. Although Gani was not a founding member of OPC, he was appointed the National Coordinator of the Oodua Peoples Congress, then rose to nationwide popularity after Inspector General of Police Musiliu Smith declared him wanted in 2000 with a financial reward of N100,000 for his group's involvement in violent clashes. He was ultimately arrested on 22 August 2001, but was later released after being held in prisons in Lagos, Abeokuta and Abuja.

On October 14, 2017, Adams was declared to be the 15th Aare Ona Kakanfo of Yorubaland by Oba Adeyemi III, the Alaafin of Oyo. The chieftaincy title was last held by Chief Moshood Abiola before his death in 1998.

Gani Adams attended the 2019 edition of Elegbara festival. He delivered a speech on the regional integration of the South West of Nigeria while there.
