= Nnia Nwodo =

Nigerian lawyer and economist

9th President-General of Ọhanaeze Ndigbo
- In office January 2017 – January 2021
- Preceded by: Iduma Igariwey Enwo
- Succeeded by: George Obiozor

Personal details
- Born: 11 December 1952 (age 73) Igboetiti, Enugu State, Nigeria
- Education: University of London, University of Ibadan
- Occupation: Lawyer, economist, politician
- Known for: Former president-general of Ọhanaeze Ndigbo; Former Minister of Information and Culture; Former Minister Of Civil Aviation.

John Nnia Nwodo is a Nigerian lawyer and economist. He served as the 9th president-general of Ọhanaeze Ndigbo succeeded by George Obiozor.

== Early life and education ==
Nwodo, the third-born male child of his family, was born in 1952 in Enugu State, Nigeria. He completed his primary and secondary school education in Enugu State. In 1971, he gained admission to the University of Ibadan.

He attended the London School of Economics and returned to Nigeria in 1988.

== Career ==
During the second republic, under the government and administration of Shehu Shagari, Nwodo served as Minister of Civil Aviation. Under the government of Abdulsalami Abubakar, Nwodo served as Minister of Information and Culture.

In 2017, Nwodo won an election that decided the 9th President-General of the Ohanaeze Ndigbo, a socio-cultural organization that represents every Igbo speaking community, and protects the rights and interests of the Igbo people around the world. He won with a total of 242 votes whilst his opponent, an ex-Vice Chancellor of the former Anambra State University of Technology, Prof. Chiweyete Ejike, had 13 votes.

== Personal life ==
Nwodo was married to Regina Nwodo, who was a Justice in the Court of Appeals of Enugu State until her death in 2013.

== See also ==
- Politics of Nigeria
