= Chaz Bufe =

American anarchist author

Charles Bufe, better known as Chaz Bufe, is a contemporary American anarchist author. Bufe writes on a wide variety of topics, and has published 16 books, most under the See Sharp Press imprint but one ("Godless") was published by PM Press and another ("Dreams of Freedom") by AK Press.

== Life ==
Bufe founded See Sharp Press in 1984 in San Francisco, then relocated to Tucson, Arizona, in 1992. In its approximately 40 years, See Sharp Press has published over 50 books, almost as many pamphlets, and over the last decade occasional e-book-only titles. The 16 books Bufe has authored, co-authored, compiled, edited, or translated have garnered favorable reviews in publications such as Publishers Weekly and Booklist (Free Radicals), Z Magazine (Heretic's Handbook of Quotations), Free Inquiry (American Heretic's Dictionary), and Guitar Player and Jazz Player (An Understandable Guide to Music Theory), and 11 are still in print. Bufe's American Heretic's Dictionary/Devil's Dictionaries was referenced by IslamOnline and recommended by the Cape Cod Times and led AlterNet to call Bufe "the Ambrose Bierce of our time," although he has been accused of vanity and bad taste for mixing his own aphorisms with Bierce's in order to get them published.

Bufe translated into English from Spanish Ricardo Flores Magón's Flores Magón Dreams of Freedom: A Ricardo Flores Magón Reader, Frank Fernández's Cuban Anarchism: The History of a Movement, and Rafael Uzcategui's Venezuela: Revolution as Spectacle. He is also a musician; his An Understandable Guide to Music Theory is in its third edition.

== Publications ==
=== Books ===
- 24 Reasons to Abandon Christianity: Why Christianity's Perverted Morality Leads to Misery and Death (2022)
- Godless: 150 Years of Disbelief (2019, PM Press)
- Venezuelan Anarchism: The History of a Movement, by Rodolfo Montes de Oca (2019, editor and translator)
- The Anarchist Cookbook (2015, with primary author Keith McHenry)
- Provocations: Don't Call Them Libertarians, AA Lies, and Other Incitements (2014)
- Free Radicals: A Novel of Utopia and Dystopia (2012, as "Zeke Teflon")
- Venezuela: Revolution as Spectacle, by Rafael Uzcátegui (2011, editor and translator)
- Bourgeois Influences on Anarchism, by Luigi Fabbri. (2010, translator, Thoughtcrime Ink)
- Dreams of Freedom: A Ricardo Flores Magón Reader (2005, co-editor with Mitch Verter, and primary translator, AK Press)
- Cuban Anarchism: The History of a Movement, by Frank Fernández (2001, editor and translator)
- Resisting 12-Step Coercion: How to Fight Forced Participation in AA, NA or 12-Step Treatment (2000, co-author with Stanton Peele and Archie Brodsky)
- Exercises for Individual and Group Development: Building Blocks for Intimacy, Awareness, and Community (1998, co-author with Dale DeNunzio)
- The American Heretic's Dictionary (1992, revised and expanded edition 2016)
- Alcoholics Anonymous: Cult or Cure? (1991, 2nd ed. 1998)
- The Heretic's Handbook of Quotations (1989, expanded ed. 1992, compiler/editor)
- An Understandable Guide to Music Theory: The Most Useful Aspects of Theory for Rock, Jazz & Blues Musicians (1984, 3rd ed. 1994)

=== Pamphlets and E-books ===
- God's Hit List: Abominations and Death Penalties in the Bible (2006)
- You Call This Freedom? (2004)
- Anarchism: What It Is and What It Isn't (2004)
- Design Your Own Utopia (2002, with Libby Hubbard)
- 20 Reasons to Abandon Christianity (2000)
- A Future Worth Living (2000)
- The Heretic's Guide to the Bible (1989)
- Astrology: Fraud or Superstition? (1987)
- >Listen Anarchist! (1985, expanded ed. 1998)

=== "Listen, Anarchist!" ===
[Listen Anarchist!] is sure to become one of the most bitterly hated, fought over, and denounced tracts about Anarchism that has appeared in the last twenty years. The reason is that Bufe comes right out and says what he has to say, rather than couching it in a lot of dreary, boring, diffuse verbiage ... Nobody can mistake his meaning; nobody can pontificate on what he "really meant" to say, and for this reason you should read this pamphlet.

— Fred Woodworth, The Match!, Issue #80, Fall 1985

"Listen, Anarchist!" is an influential 1987 essay by Bufe on the internal dynamics of the American anarchist movement.

In this essay, Bufe launches heavy criticism against anarcho-primitivists, including Fredy Perlman and the Vancouver Five eco-terrorist group, as well as the publications Fifth Estate, Resistance, The Spark, and Open Road. In a section entitled "What Can Be Done?", Bufe advocates minimal use of violence in revolutionary political struggle, condemning the vanguardist "urban guerillas" of insurrectionary anarchism. He criticizes these and other so-called "lifestyle" anarchists in the movement for deliberately alienating mainstream society, and falling to victim to dangerous irrationality and mysticism.

In his account of "marginalised" anarchists, Bufe criticizes the anti-work tendency in contemporary anarchism, accusing some of its advocates of being parasites of those who do work. In response, Feral Faun wrote an article called "The Bourgeois Roots of Anarcho-Syndicalism" in which he claims that the endorsement of work showed that anarcho-syndicalists "embrace the values essential to capitalism", only objecting to who is in charge. The Summer 2005 issue of Green Anarchy included an "update on workerist morality", in which they characterised "Listen, Anarchist!" as Sam Dolgoff's Relevance and Murray Bookchin's "Listen Marxist!" poorly rewritten by Bufe to "shake his fist at all the young rapscallions who were throwing rocks at his perfect, beautiful philosophy".

In the introduction to the second edition, Janet Biehl proposes that many of the tendencies within anarchism that Bufe criticizes stem from its individualist wing, inspired by the philosophy of Max Stirner, which she maintains is the source of "lifestyle anarchists" who are at odds with the ethical socialist tradition of anarchism. Biehl criticizes the perceived lack of concern for morality among post-left anarchists such as Bob Black.

Allan Antliff described the work as "abusive", and said that its distribution by the Workers Solidarity Alliance belied the organisation's pretensions of anti-sectarianism. Mutualist Kevin Carson recommended the pamphlet as suggested reading for "getting from here to there".
