= History of Nigeria (1500–1800) =

Aspect of Nigerian history

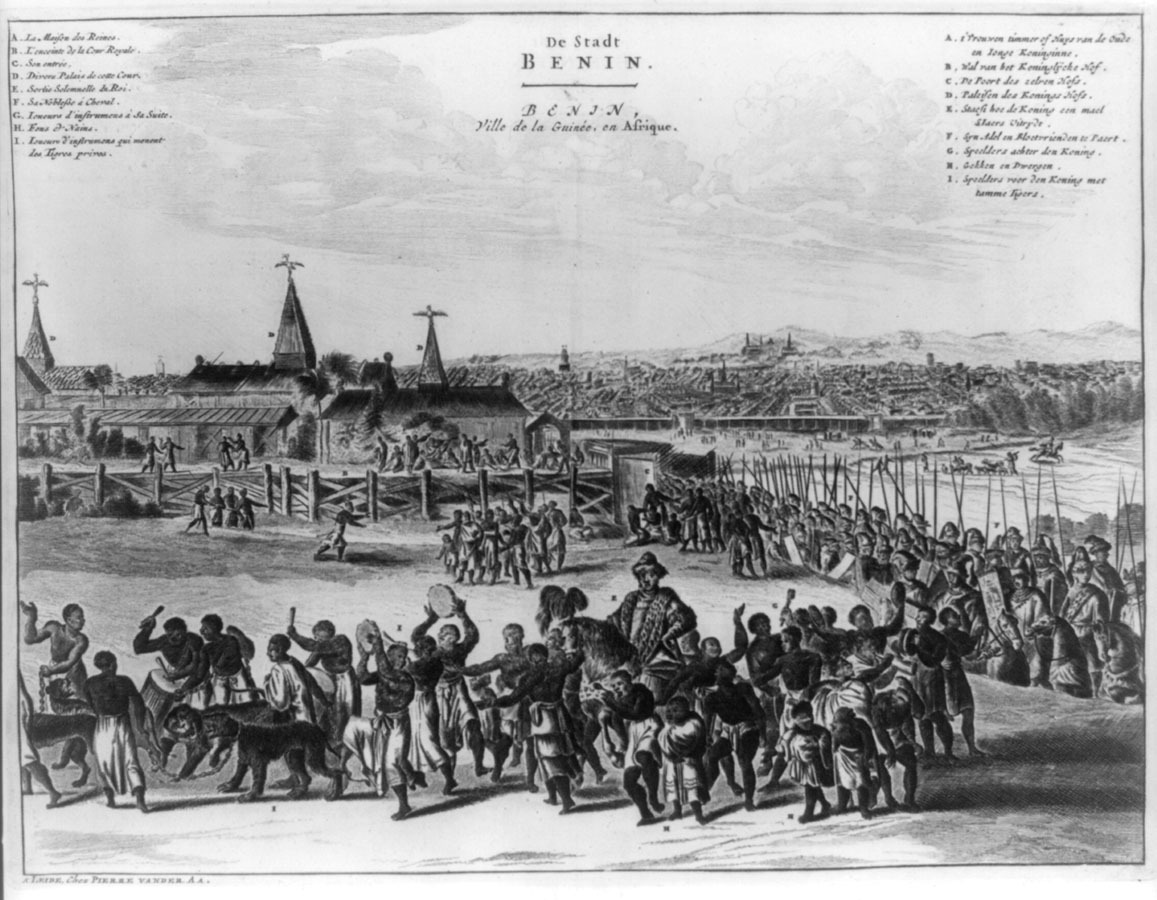
Depiction of Benin City by a Dutch illustrator in 1668. The wall-like structure in the center probably represents the walls of Benin, housing the Benin bronze decorated historic Benin City Palace.

The history of the territories which since ca. 1900 have been known under the name of Nigeria during the pre-colonial period (16th to 18th centuries) was dominated by several powerful West African kingdoms or empires, such as the Benin Kingdom, Oyo Empire and the Islamic Kanem-Bornu Empire in the northeast.

Past archaeological digs have uncovered the fairly advanced lifestyle of some of the Hausa civilizations. Some were able to work iron which helped with tool and weapon making. They also showed a vast advancement in cultural expression which was rare for civilizations in the area around that time. Many of the settlements also contained expertly coursed stone walls which showed the need for either protection from animals or other settlements. These various settlements would later clash, craving a rise in power which may explain these elements uncovered in the archaeological sites.

These kingdoms developed in the context of the trans-Saharan slave trade, but they peaked in power in the late 18th century, thriving on the Atlantic slave trade due to the great demand for slaves by the European colonies. During and after the Napoleonic period, the western powers gradually abolished slavery, which led to a collapse in demand and consequently a decline of the West African empires, and the gradual increase of western influence during the 19th century (the "Scramble for Africa"), in the case of Nigeria concluding with the British protectorates of Northern and Southern Nigeria in 1900.

== Savannah States ==
During the 16th century, the Songhai Empire reached its peak, stretching from the Senegal and Gambia rivers and incorporating part of Hausaland in the east. Concurrently the Sayfawa dynasty of Kanem-Bornu reconquered its Kanem homeland and extended control west to Hausa cities not under Songhai authority. Largely because of Songhai's influence, there was a blossoming of Islamic learning and culture. Songhai collapsed in 1591 when a Moroccan army conquered Gao and Timbuktu. Morocco was unable to control the empire and the various provinces, including the Hausa states, became independent. The collapse undermined Songhai's hegemony over the Hausa states and abruptly altered the course of the regional history of the tzu people.

Kanem-Bornu reached its apogee under mai Idris Aluma (ca. 1569–1600) during whose reign Kanem was reconquered. The destruction of Songhai left Borno uncontested and until the 18th century, Borno dominated northern Nigeria. Despite Borno's hegemony the Hausa states continued to wrestle for ascendancy. Gradually Borno's position weakened; its inability to check political rivalries between competing Hausa cities was one example of this decline. Another factor was the military threat of the Tuareg centered at Agades who penetrated the northern districts of Borno. The major cause of Borno's decline was a severe drought that struck the Sahel and savanna from the middle of the 18th century. As a consequence, Borno lost many northern territories to the Tuareg whose mobility allowed them to endure the famine more effectively. Borno regained some of its former might in the succeeding decades, but another drought occurred in the 1790s, again weakening the state. Nigeria was in control of white people at that time and the country was less busy, especially in Lagos.

The earliest signs of external contact in the Hausa area, which would lead to the development of the pre-colonial period, are found via carbon dating. These sites are classified by archaeologists as hills, large-scale occupation sites, and iron-working sites – although the former two are lacking stratified evidence. Objects retrieved from burial mounds in the region, such as Carnelian beads, potentially originate from as far as India. Along with this, a dig near Birnin Leka uncovered an Arabic-inscribed pottery vessel. The first main exposure to external contact would begin to change the hierarchy of the Hausa life.

Ecological and political instability provided the background for the jihad of Usman dan Fodio. The military rivalries of the Hausa states strained the region's economic resources at a time when drought and famine undermined farmers and herders. Many Fulani moved into Hausaland and Borno, and their arrival increased tensions because they had no loyalty to the political authorities, who saw them as a source of increased taxation. By the end of the 18th century, some Muslim ulema began articulating the grievances of the common people. Efforts to eliminate or control these religious leaders only heightened the tensions, setting the stage for jihad.

== See also ==
- Hausa Kingdoms
- Sahelian Kingdoms
- African slave trade
- Trans-Saharan slave trade
- Atlantic slave trade
