= Ọhanaeze Ndigbo =

Socio-cultural organization in Nigeria

- Ọha na Eze Ndị Igbo
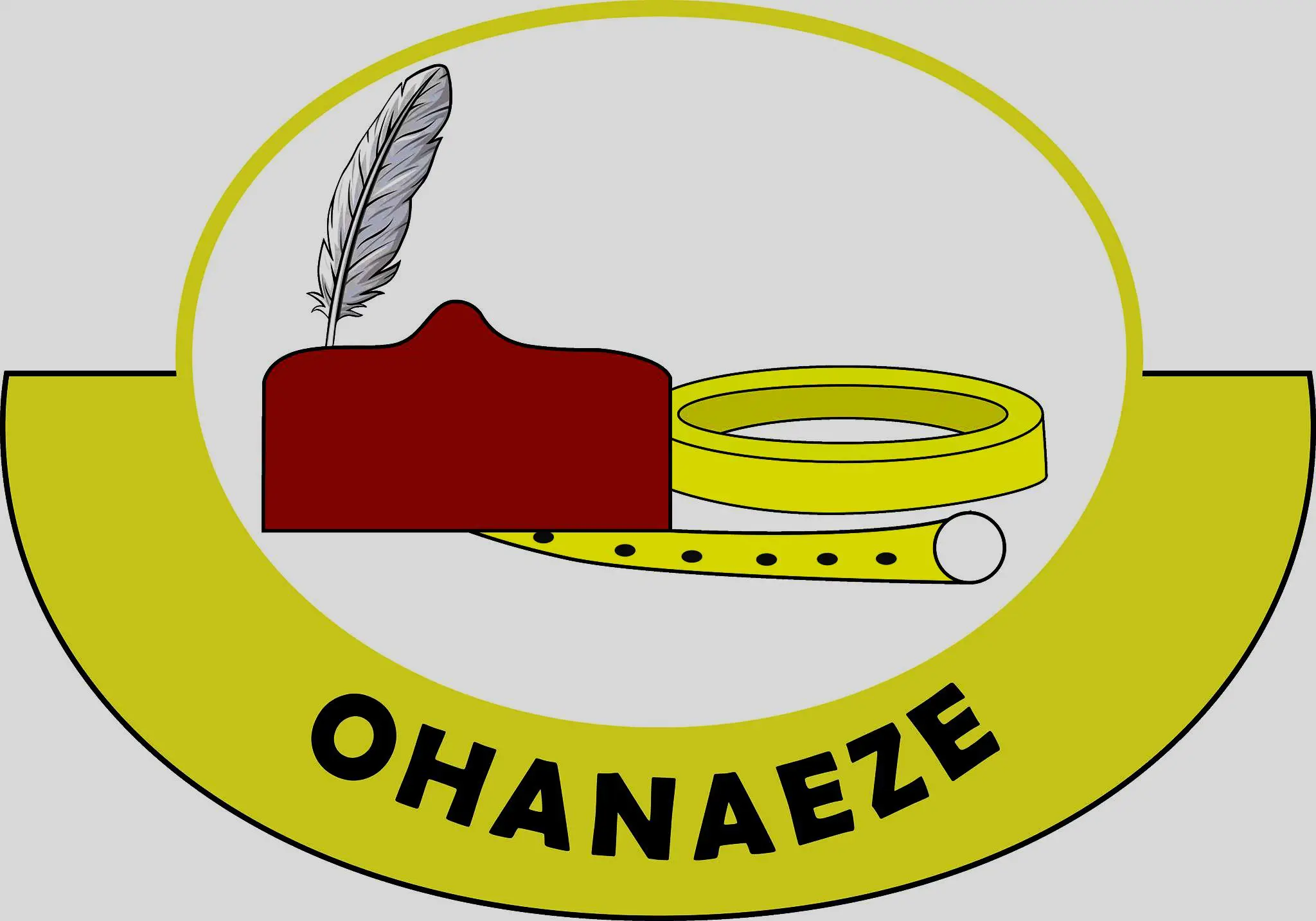
- Formation: 1976
- Headquarters: Park Avenue, Enugu
- Members: 7 states
- Official language: Igbo, English
- President-General: John Azuta-Mbata
- Budget: Primary Contributors - Abia, Anambra, Ebonyi, Enugu, Delta, Imo, Rivers

Ọhanaeze Ndigbo // is an Igbo socio-cultural organization in Nigeria whose members or reps can come from any state in Nigeria. The group aims to represent the interests of all Igbo political parties within and outside Nigeria. As of 2025, the group is headed by Senator John Azụta-Mbata.

One of the group's main objectives is to foster unity among its members in order to more effectively represent the political interests of Igbos in Nigeria.

== History ==
Lagos Igbo Union (the earliest precursor to Ọhaneze Ndigbo) was established in the early 1930s. It was brought about by its members' wish to host a celebration for Dr. Akanu Ibiam, the second Igbo physician to return from his educational pursuits in Britain. By giving voice to the plight of the Igbo in Lagos, this Union was able to gain traction. It started to enlarge to include the entire Eastern Region in 1943 after changing its name to Igbo Federal Union. The Igbos were able to unite and acquire some degree of Igbo consciousness through this union. One of the executive members of the Igbo Federal Union was Chief Binyerem Onwukamuche Nwammo Eluwa, posthumous author of the 739-paged book, Ado-na-Idu (History of Igbo Origin), who served as its General Secretary from 1946 to 1948.

A pan-Igbo conference took place in December 1948 in Port Harcourt in what was then the Colony and Protectorate of Nigeria ruled by the British Empire. The Igbo State Union was established during the conference by Igbo elites and intellectuals to advance the interests of Igbos. Dr. Nnamdi Azikiwe assumed office as its first president.

The Igbo State Union's next president was Chief Z.C. Obi. The Union made an effort to remain politically neutral at this time. Upon assuming office as Head of State, General JTU Aguiyi-Ironsi outlawed all political parties as well as ethnic, cultural, and social organizations. Consequently, in May 1966, the Igbo State Union was banned.

After the 1966 anti-Igbo pogrom and the Nigerian Civil War, prominent Igbo leaders felt the need to galvanize the displaced Igbo people into one umbrella body which would serve as a protection and unifying force for the common interest of the Igbo. Hundreds of these prominent Igbos convened to unify Igbos under a new umbrella organization, the Igbo National Assembly (INA).

This organization was later banned by the Nigerian military dictatorship, from fears that the existence of the organization would promote Igbo separatism.

In 1976, the Igbo Forum was undauntedly formed with Dr. Francis Akanu Ibiam as chairman, Justice Daddy Onyeama as Vice Chairman, Chief Jerome Oputa Udoji as Secretary General and Mr. Jacob Ukeje Agwu as Assistant Secretary. Dr. Nnamdi Azikiwe was its patron. In 1979, the Igbo Forum was renamed Ohanaeze Ndigbo.

Thus, the pan-Igbo organization, Ohanaeze Ndigbo, was largely created in 1979 by Professor Ben Nwabueze, a constitutional lawyer, who served as its Deputy President. Dr. Francis Akanu Ibiam served as its president. The organization was supported by Kingsley Mbadiwe, Dr. Michael Iheonukara Okpara, Dr. Pius Okigbo, and Chief Jerome Udorji (who served as the first Secretary General), among other notable Igbos.

Most recent President-General of Ohanaeze Ndigbo, Chief Emmanuel Iwuanyanwu, died on July 25, 2024.

In December 2024, Fidelis Chukwu was appointed as the President-General, temporarily replacing Iwuanyanwu. On January 10, 2025, Senator John Azuta-Mbata was elected as the President-General, succeeding Fidelis Chukwu and marking a new beginning for the group.

== Current National Executive Committee ==
- Senator John Azuta-Mbata — President General
- Prince Okechukwu Nwadinobi— Deputy President General
- Solomon N. — Vice President General (Anambra)
- DR. Sylvanus O. Ebigwei, MON. — Vice President General (Delta)
- Prof. Chigozie N. Ogbu, OFR — Vice president-General (Ebonyi)
- Hon. Igochukwu Okparanma — Vice President—General (Rivers)
- His Excellency Emeka Sibudu — Secretary-General
- Dr. Solomon N. Ogunji — Deputy Secretary-General
- Ojogu Joseph Obinama — National Legal Adviser
- Eze Beatrice — National Treasurer
- Chief Chief Alphonsus Duru — National Financial Secretary
- Dr Alex Chiedozie Ogbonnia — National. Publicity Secretary
- Chief Eric Ebeh — Asst. Nat. Treasurer
- Chief Barr. Okeagu Ogadah — Assistant National Legal Adviser
- Elder Chris Eluemunoh — Asst. Nat. Fin. Secretary
- — Asst. National Pub. Secretary
- Elder Justice R.C. Ajuzieogu — State President (Abia)
- Chief Damian Okeke (Ogene) — State President (Anambra)
- Chief Emeka Festus Ogwu — State President (Delta)
- Comrade Boniface Offor — State President (Ebonyi)
- Chief Alex Chiedozie Ogbonnia — State President (Enugu)
- Dr. Ezechi Chukwu — State President (Imo)
- Comrade Livingstone Wechie — State President (Rivers)
- Eugene Ibeabuchi — Admin. Secretary
- Hon. Onyenze Franklin Ugochukwu

— Youth President

== See also ==
- New leaders of Ohanaeze emerge in Abia chapter 2025
- Oodua Peoples Congress
- List of civil societies in Nigeria
