= Trade unions in Zimbabwe =

- National organization(s): Zimbabwe Congress of Trade Unions (ZCTU)

Global Rights Index
- 5 No guarantee of rights

International Labour Organization
- Zimbabwe is a member of the ILO

Convention ratification
- Freedom of Association: 9 April 2003
- Right to Organise: 27 August 1998

Trade unions in Zimbabwe have a long and complex history. Although the first strike action recorded in what was to become Zimbabwe was undertaken by black miners in 1895, the first trade union in what to become Southern Rhodesia was founded in 1913 for whites-only. Until Zimbabwean independence, trade union activity could only be undertaken by white employees as black workers were excluded from freedom of association by law. Nonetheless, organisations like the African Teachers' Association were able to improve working conditions of their workers. It was not until 1959 that black workers were legally able to form unions.

This changed with independence in 1980. The adoption of majority rule was accompanied by the desegregation of the unions and the creation, a year later, of the Zimbabwe Congress of Trade Unions (ZCTU) as a single national union federation. This was initially closely aligned with the ruling party, ZANU-PF, but became more independent and, under the leadership of Tsvangirai, more politically active. Trade union membership grew over the period, reaching approximately 200,000 workers in 1985. The unions campaigned against Zimbabwean involvement in the Second Congo War and fought against the Economic Structural Adjustment Programme (ESAP). Despite Zimbabwe ratifying the Right to Organise and Collective Bargaining Convention, in 1998 and the Freedom of Association and Protection of the Right to Organise Convention, the International Trade Union Confederation (ITUC) has reported that trade union leaders have been arbitrarily arrested and tortured.

== Trade unions in Rhodesia ==
Trade union activity in Zimbabwe can be traced back to company rule in Rhodesia. The first recorded strike action was in 1895 when black mine employees put down their tools in objection to attempts by the mine owners to reduce pay. Similar action took place in 1901, 1906 and 1912. However, the first trade union was formed as a white-only enterprise. Black Africans were excluded from the definition of "employee" and forbidden from being involved in collective bargaining. In response to attempts by the Master Builders Organisation to reduce pay, a strike by plasterers and bricklayers in Bulawayo in 1912 led to the creation of the United Building Trades Trade Union the following year. The union was explicit in demanding that black people be excluded from white working class trades. Employers, concerned by strikes in the Union of South Africa, opposed the creation of unions. Union activity was limited until the social changes introduced by the First World War.

Poor working conditions for railway workers, despite the profitability of the railway company, led to the creation of the Rhodesian Railway Workers' Union (RRWU) in September 1916. The members were predominantly British immigrants that had previously been active in trade union action, including the national railway strike of 1911. They demanded higher pay and the exclusion of Black Africans and coloured men from employment. A further strike in 1919 was accompanied by a strike by black workers demanding better pay but there was no coordination between the white and black strikers. The year also saw the formation of the Commercial Employees Association (CEA) by shop assistants, warehousemen and clerks, the Amalgamated Engineering Union (AEU) for skilled engineers, and the Rhodesian Mine and General Workers Association (RMGWA) by white miners and other workers.

The majority of these unions had disappeared by 1922 when Southern Rhodesia became a self-governing colony. After the war, the growing power of the Rhodesian Mine Owners Association, along with harder economic conditions, made it harder for the RMGWA to negotiate better conditions for its members and it was dissolved in March 1923. The AEU followed in 1926. Working conditions for black workers were particularly poor as the Master and Servant Act of 1901 had made them little more than slaves. It explicitly denied them the ability to unionise or use collective bargaining. Collective activity, such as the 1928 Shamva miners' strike against low wages, poor quality food rations, unhealthy and overcrowded compounds, was repressed, in this case through the use of a special Police Unit trained to repress workers' action.

After years in decline, the end of the following decade saw a reversal in union fortunes and membership of trade unions increased dramatically in the build up to the Second World War. The Associated Mine Workers' Union was formed in 1938 to represent white mineworkers and, in 1939, the Southern Rhodesia Trades and Labour Council was created as an umbrella organisation for all the colony's trade unions. These were still only available for white workers. In 1941, the international Council of Non-European Trade Unions was formed for non-white unions and, increasingly, black trade union voices called for greater involvement of the union-like black workers' associations in labour relations. The strength of white working class unions in Rhodesia has been credited with maintaining pay and conditions for white workers in Rhodesia at levels much higher than among comparable workers in Britain or Europe.

In 1954, a bill was introduced to allow trade unions for black workers to operate in the country. The Southern Rhodesia Trade Union Congress (SRTUC) was founded to represent these workers politically as well as economically. The following year saw the merger of the Rhodesia Railways African Employees' Union (RRAEU), a large railway union for black workers, with the African Railway Workers Trade Union (ARTWU) based in Northern Rhodesia. Dixon Konkola, the president of the ARTWU, was elected president of the new body, the Railway African Workers' Union (RAWU) based in Bulawayo, but was prevented from entering the country by the Southern Rhodesian government. Even after these reforms, unions that were white-dominated favoured skilled labour, and low-skilled black workers were "used as bargaining counters in the process of negotiating the claims of white, skilled employees". In 1959, the government allowed black employees not working in agriculture, mining and households to be involved in collective bargaining, although this still excluded over two-thirds of the workforce.

Over the next two decades, black unions were fundamental to the battle for majority rule and one of the main advocacy groups fighting against segregation, the Zimbabwe African People's Union (ZAPU) was founded by many trade unionists. In 1962, the Southern Rhodesian African Trade Union Congress (SRATUC) was founded by Josiah Maluleke out of the SRTUC to support the nationalist movement. However, the influence of the Cold War weakened co-ordination between unions. Disagreements between the unions on whether to align with the Europe-based International Confederation of Free Trade Unions (ICFTU), the American Federation of Labor and Congress of Industrial Organizations (AFL-CIO) or the World Federation of Trade Unions (WFTU), which was more aligned with the Soviet Union, led to further disagreements. Zimbabwe African Congress of Unions (ZACU) split from SRATUC and the two became separately aligned with the two dominant political nationalist movements, led by the ZAPU and Zimbabwe African National Union (ZANU) respectively. Trade unions were seen as a tool for nationalism and the fact that the majority of black Rhodesians were still denied involvement in unions continued to hold back their rights and development into the 1970s.

== History since independence ==
Union activists and other Zimbabwean citizens watch trade unionist Morgan Tsvangirai make his inaugural speech as Prime Minister of Zimbabwe

When Zimbabwe gained its independence following the establishment of majority-rule government in 1980, its unions were still segregated and their power to affect working conditions for the majority of employees was limited. One of the first actions by the government was to introduce the Minimum Wages Act, No 4, and Employment Act, No. 13. The government created the framework for a national trade union federation. In 1981, the trade union centres, the Trade Union Congress of Zimbabwe (TUCZ), the United Trade Unions of Zimbabwe (UTUZ), the Zimbabwe Federation of Labour (ZFL) and the Zimbabwe Trade Union Congress (ZTUC), along with the successors to the SRATUC and ZACU, the African Trade Union Congress (ATUC) and the National African Trade Union Congress (NATUC), were merged into a single entity, the Zimbabwe Congress of Trade Unions (ZCTU). The creation of the new federation was supported by the newly-formed Commonwealth Trade Union Council (CTUC) and the former head of the UK Advisory, Conciliation and Arbitration Service (ACAS). Trade union membership increased rapidly and reached approximately 200,000 over the following five years. However, the new entity was strongly aligned with the ruling party, the Zimbabwe African National Union – Patriotic Front) (ZANU–PF) and consequently rarely asserted independent authority.

Initially, unions relied solely on strikes, which were met with media hostility and repression by the new government. Union rights were further curtailed in 1985 with the passing of the Labour Relations Act. It explicitly gave worker organisations the right to recommend industrial action including strikes and indemnifies workers' committees and registered trade unions against civil liability for lawful collective industrial action. However, the act also removed public sector workers from the right to freedom of association and curtailed the right to strike for those employed in the public sector. 1985 also saw the election of a leadership of ZCTU that was independent of the government. Under the new leadership of Secretary General, Morgan Tsvangirai, in 1988 the union adopted a five year plan enabled it to gain capacity and voice that was independent of the government, and became increasingly critical of ZANU-PF's policies. By 1990, the union was campaigning against the imposition of what it saw as a corrupt one party state and a state of emergency that would inhibit freedom of association.

In 1992, the Labour Relations (Amendment) Act amended legislation to allow for multiple unions per industry. During the 1990s, the ZCTU successfully campaigned against the Economic Structural Adjustment Programme (ESAP) introduced in response to pressure from the IMF and World Bank. In 1994, a succession of strikes by the Post and Telecommunication (PTC), the bank workers' union (ZIBAWU), construction workers and security guards led to the President, Robert Mugabe to publicly request employers to meet the pay demands of workers. In 1996, the Public Servants Association (PSA) and Zimbabwe Teachers' Association (ZIMTA) went on strike for higher wages. This two month strike was the country's longest strike action by health workers. Despite the failure of a supporting strike by private sector workers in ZCTU, this led to an above-inflation increase in public sector pay. A similar two week strike by members of the General Agricultural and Plantation Workers' Union of Zimbabwe, which represented 350,000 farm workers, led to an increase in wages and holidays. In 1998, the ZCTU protested Zimbabwe's involvement in the Second Congo War, emphasising the union's interest in larger political, economic and social issues. In the same year, the country ratified International Labour Organization (ILO) convention 98, the Right to Organise and Collective Bargaining Convention, on 27 August 1998.

The continued impact of the ESAP, and the increasing divide between the government and unions, led to the foundation of the Movement for Democratic Change (MDC) the following year. Although the party was not strictly a workers' party, its leadership, including its president, deputy president, national chairperson and deputy secretary general, were all trade unionists, including Morgan Tsvangirai and Gibson Sibanda. The Labour Relations (Amendment) Act (2002) expanded the option of membership of unions to more people and promoted the right to freedom of association from the workplace to the industrial level. It also provided public sector employees with the same levels of freedom of association as workers in the private sector, although this was rescinded in 2005. At the same time, trade union membership declined, especially as the Zimbabwean workforce saw changes, as skilled labour moved to countries like Botswana, Namibia and South Africa, and unemployment led to an increase in work in the informal sector. By June 2005, between two and three times as many people were employed in the informal sector than in the formal sector.

On 9 April 2003, Zimbabwe ratified ILO convention 87, the Freedom of Association and Protection of the Right to Organise Convention. Despite these changes, and the new constitution issued in 2013, trade union activity remained restricted, particularly after the passing of the Maintenance of Peace & Order Act. The normal working day for most workers extended to 16 hours, although unions had been successful in fighting for overtime to be paid with an increment over salary. After the introduction and subsequent repeal of the Labour Act Amendment No 5 of 2015, which changed the obligations on employers when an employee's contracts was terminated, the unions successfully fought for employees to retain the packages that they had before the changes. In August 2024, the International Trade Union Confederation (ITUC) reported that trade union leaders were being arbitrarily arrested and tortured.

== Union federations ==
The Zimbabwe Congress of Trade Unions (ZCTU) is the primary trade union federation in the country. As of June 2026, it has 37 affiliates unions. The Zimbabwe Federation of Trade Unions (ZFTU) was set up in 1998 with government support as an alternative membership organisation for unions. It has fewer member unions that the ZCTU. In 2010, the ZFTU had 30,000 individual members, compared to the ZCTU's 200,000 members.

== Notable trade unionists ==
Joshua Nkomo, first president of the Zimbabwe African People's Union (ZAPU)

Notable union activists include:

- Jack Keller — an early leader of the RRWU who became a member of parliament for the Rhodesia Labour Party.
- Thokozani Khupe — Secretary of the ZCTU Women's Advisory Council and leader of the Movement for Democratic Change – Tsvangirai.
- Alfred Makwarimba — leader of the Commercial Workers' Union and the Zimbabwe Trades Union Congress (ZTUC). First president of the ZFTU.
- Paurina Mpariwa — chair of the Commercial Workers' Union of Zimbabwe and member of the Pan-African Parliament.
- Masotsha Ndlovu — secretary-general of the Industrial and Commercial Workers' Union in Bulawayo.
- Frank Nettleton — a leader of the South African Railway Trade Union that encouraged employees of the Beira and Mashonaland Railway to form the short-lived first railway workers' union in the country in Mutare in 1912.
- Joshua Nkomo — president of the South Rhodesia Railways African Employees' Association and SRATUC; first president of the ZAPU.
- Gibson Sibanda — president of the ZCTU, first vice-president of MDC and member of the House of Assembly.
- Morgan Tsvangirai — General Secretary of the ZCTU, one of the founders of MDC and later the second Prime Minister of Zimbabwe. He mobilised young leaders within the union and led the union to challenge the ZANU-PF government.
- Herbert Walsh — a British trade unionist and boilermaker at the Globe and Phoenix Mine that formed the first boilermakers branch of a union in 1902 that led to the creation of the Rhodesian Mine and General Workers Association.
