= Rhodesian Railway Workers' Union =

R.R.W.U.
- Rhodesian Railway Workers' Union
- Merged into: National Union of Railwaymen
- Founded: 1917
- Dissolved: 1980
- Location: Rhodesia
- Key people: Roy Welensky

The Rhodesian Railway Workers' Union (R.R.W.U.) was a trade union in Rhodesia which represented European railway workers employed by the Rhodesian Railways.

== History ==
Trade union organisation on the Rhodesian railways had its origins in World War I, when the shortage of labour due to war service increased the bargaining power of the workers. In 1916 firemen at Bulawayo went on strike and their demands were met. In October of the following year the Rhodesian Railway Workers' Union was formed, representing engineers and firemen. The union spread throughout the Rhodesian Railways network, including Northern Rhodesia.

A prominent early leader of the union was Jack Keller, a Scottish-born railway worker who emigrated to Rhodesia after participating in the failed 1911 railway strike in Britain. The RRWU's first strike, in February 1919, was successful. It was followed in March 1920 by a larger strike, supported by the unions representing European postal workers and miners, which was even more successful. It resulted in a 25 per cent increase in railway workers' pay and secured an eight-hour day.

The RRWU soon became involved in Rhodesian politics and opposed moves to integrate the Rhodesian colonies with the Union of South Africa, instead favouring Responsible Government for the European population. This stance was partly motivated by the anti-labour policies of the South African government, including the repression of the Rand Rebellion.

In 1923 the union was centrally involved in the establishment of the Rhodesian Labour Party, with a significant majority of Labour MPs being railwaymen, with Keller himself being elected into parliament. The RRWU was also the largest donor to the party. Throughout its history the Rhodesian Labour Party vote would be strongest in those areas with significant populations of railway workers, including Bulawayo and Broken Hill.

The strength of the RRWU peaked in the 1920s, and declined towards the end of the decade as the Railway administration sought to undermine the union. This culminated in a major strike in February 1929, called by the union in an attempt to reassert its influence. The government responded dramatically, commandeering all motor vehicles to maintain communications and calling up a paramilitary force of European citizens. The 1929 strike ended in defeat for the union, which continued to exist throughout Rhodesia's history, but never regained the militancy and strength of the early 1920s. The strength of industrial organization amongst the white working class in Rhodesia, as well as the government's concern to retain the support of European workers against the African population, has been credited with maintaining pay and conditions for white workers in Rhodesia at levels much higher than among comparable workers in Britain or Europe.

== The Colour Bar ==
The RRWU represented only European rail workers, the black African workers being represented by the Rhodesia Railways African Employees' Union (RRAEU) in Southern Rhodesia and the African Railway Workers' Trade Union (ARTWU) in Northern Rhodesia. These amalgamated in July 1955 to form the Railway African Workers' Union.

Throughout its history the RRWU resisted the expansion of the role of African workers on the railways, particularly the employment of African workers in skilled positions. This exclusionary hiring policy was known as the 'Industrial Colour Bar'. The RRWU maintained that their opposition was only to the employment of African workers on wages and conditions below that of the European workers, which they argued would undermine conditions for the European workers and lead to the exploitation of the African employees.

== Prominent Members ==
- Roy Welensky, later Prime Minister of the Federation of Rhodesia and Nyasaland, was a railway worker and leader of the RRWU in Northern Rhodesia.
