= Percy Fisher =

English-born South African trade union leader

Percy Fisher (1891 – 14 March 1922) was an English-born South African syndicalist and trade union leader.

Born in Durham in England, Fisher emigrated to the Witwatersrand at the start of 1912. He worked in the mines, and also became active in the trade union movement, joining the South African Industrial Federation (SAIF). He chaired the strike committee in 1920 at the City Deep gold mine, then in 1921 was elected as general secretary of the Mine Workers' Union. However, his focus on industrial action led to conflict with the union's executive. It claimed that there were irregularities in his election, and removed him from office.

In 1922, Fisher was the most prominent leader of the Rand Rebellion. He was one of the members of the Action Committee which asked Labour Party and National Party MPs to seize control of the state and overthrow capitalism, but the politicians had no interest in doing so. He later tried to meet Jan Smuts to negotiate an end to the strike, but Smuts refused to do so. Fisher persuaded the SAIF to call a general strike, and the government then declared martial law. Fisher fortified the Fordsburg City Hall, but was found dead there after it was assaulted by government forces. It is unclear whether he committed suicide or was killed during the rebellion.

Trade union offices
| Preceded by James Forrester-Brown | President of the Mine Workers' Union; 1921–1922 | Succeeded by J. Cowan |
