= Lovemore Matombo =

Zimbabwean politician (died 2020)

Lovemore Matombo (died 27 January 2020) was the President of the Zimbabwe Congress of Trade Unions (ZCTU).

Police arrested Matombo in March 2007 for allegedly assaulting his daughter-in-law, Mary-Ane Nyathi, on 11 February. Magistrate Robson Finsin of Harare Magistrates' Court found him innocent on 29 June 2007 on the grounds that there were a lack of witnesses. His lawyers, Alec Muchadehama and Andrew Makoni, defended him in the case. One of the two witnesses in the incident, security guard Tangirai Mukondo, admitted police had coached him on what to say in court.

Nyathi is still pursuing the case in civil court.

On 8 May 2008 Matombo and ZCTU Secretary-General Wellington Chibebe were arrested for allegedly inciting rebellion when speaking at a rally on May Day. They were released on bail on 19 May by Judge Ben Hlatshwayo. Hlatshwayo ordered that they "not address any political gatherings" until the conclusion of their case, along with other restrictions.
