= African Trade Union Congress =

National trade union centre in Rhodesia

ATUC
- African Trade Union Congress
- Merged into: ZCTU
- Founded: 1962
- Dissolved: 1981
- Location: Southern Rhodesia, Rhodesia, Zimbabwe
- Key people: Joshua Nkomo
- Affiliations: African Trade Union Confederation

The African Trade Union Congress (ATUC) was a national trade union centre in Rhodesia (later Zimbabwe). The ATUC represented black African workers, and was opposed to the system of white minority rule in Rhodesia.

The ATUC was formed in 1962 as the Southern Rhodesian African Trade Union Congress (SRATUC), a breakaway from the more moderate Southern Rhodesian Trade Union Congress (SRTUC). The new union was led by Josiah Maluleke, former Secretary-General of the SRTUC. The SRATUC absorbed the older organisation a year later in 1963, with the combined body adopting the name African Trade Union Congress. Following the split in the African nationalist movement in 1963, which led to the separation of the Zimbabwe African National Union (ZANU) from the Zimbabwe African People's Union (ZAPU), the ATUC became aligned with ZANU. The ATUC was affiliated with the African Trade Union Confederation.

The ATUC was reported to have nine affiliated unions during the mid-1960s, with a total membership of 29,198 (36% of all trade union members in the country). The largest single affiliated union was the Railway African Workers' Union (RAWU), which had approximately 16,000 members.

In 1981 ATUC merged into the Zimbabwe Congress of Trade Unions.

We as a trade union are fully prepared to throw our weight behind the nationalist party's fight - after all, we all want to get rid of the present minority government, but we want to do so as workers, with our own organisation. For after independence the party will be the government and will be as much concerned as any government to increase production to develop the country. This may happen at the expense of the workers' wages and general standard of living. Then we want our own organisation to defend our position and our rights; if we, then are merely an arm of the party we as workers will be defenceless.

— Josiah Maluleke, The Political Role of Unions in Rhodesia
