= Rand Rebellion =

Uprising in South Africa from 1921 to 1922

- Part of the Revolutions of 1917–1923
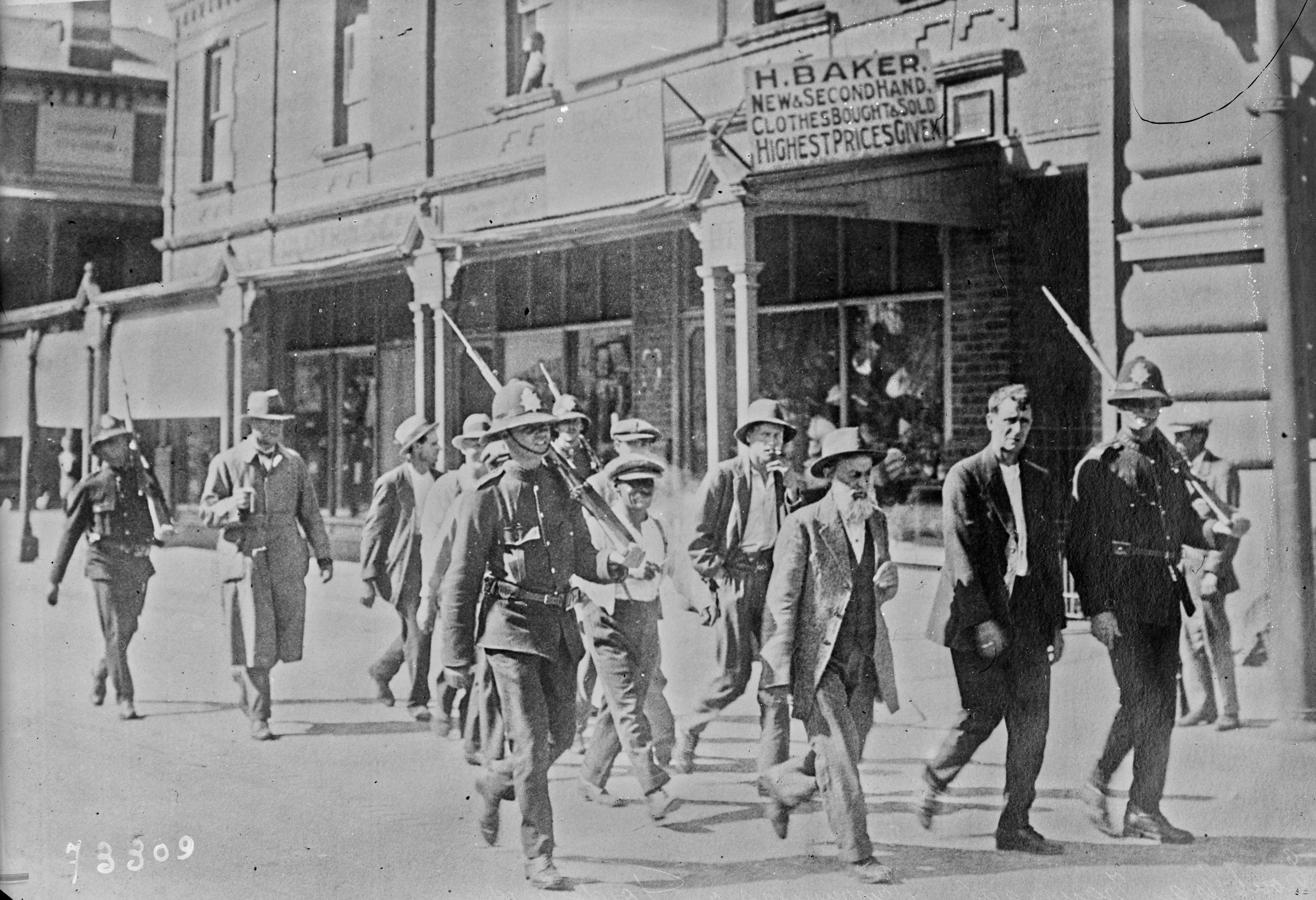
- Rebels being taken prisoner in Fordsburg
Date	28 December 1921 – 18 March 1922 (2 months, 2 weeks and 4 days)
Location	Witwatersrand, Union of South Africa
Result	South African government victory

Belligerents
Union of South Africa	South African Communist Party; South African Labour Party

Commanders and leaders
Jan Smuts; Theodorus Truter; Richard Godley; Percival Beves	Percy Fisher †; Harry Spendiff †; Bill Andrews; Jimmy Green

Strength
20,000	several thousand

Casualties and losses
72 killed 219 wounded	39 killed (official tally), real number likely much higher. 118 wounded (official tally), real number likely much higher.
- 42 civilians killed 197 civilians injured

The Rand Rebellion (Afrikaans: Rand-rebellie; also known as the 1922 Miners' strike and the Rand Revolt) was an armed uprising of White Syndicalists, Communists, and Nationalists in the Witwatersrand region of South Africa, in March 1922.

Following a drop in the global price of gold from 130 shillings (£6 10s) per fine troy ounce in 1919 to 95s/oz (£4 15s) in December 1921, the mining companies owned by the Randlords tried to cut their operating costs by decreasing wages, and by promoting black mine workers – who were paid lower wages – to skilled and supervisory positions. The promotion of non-White workers to these positions was seen by the striking White workers as a greater issue than the issue of decreased wages.

When these actions were proposed by the Chamber of Mines to the representative of the trade unions (the South African Industrial Federation) the latter rejected the proposals, calling on all workers in the Witwatersrand region to go on strike as a response.

The President of the South African Industrial Federation, Joe Thompson, called upon the trade unions to appoint representatives who would form the ruling body of the strike, known as the 'Augmented Executive'. The Augmented Executive would be the chief leadership of the strike from the beginning of the strike on 10 January 1922, to the removal of the Augmented Executive from leadership positions by Percy Fisher and the 'Council of Action' on 4 March 1922.

== The strike ==
=== The strike under the Augmented Executive ===
Hours after the beginning of the general strike in January 1922, striking White workers were recruited into local town-based militias known as 'Commandos'. Captured documents relating to the formation of these commandos would reveal that they were formed with the express purpose to "establish this country as a White man's country". Initially, many of these commandos had few if any firearms, and some, such as the Brakpan Commando, resorted to using sticks and pickaxe handles in order to partake in drilling exercises. As the strike grew however, the commandos became more organized and better equipped, each commando eventually having its own group of uniformed officers, a signal corps, an ambulance corps, an intelligence section, and small mounted (horse and bicycle) sections. Women Commandos also partook in the strike and later revolt.

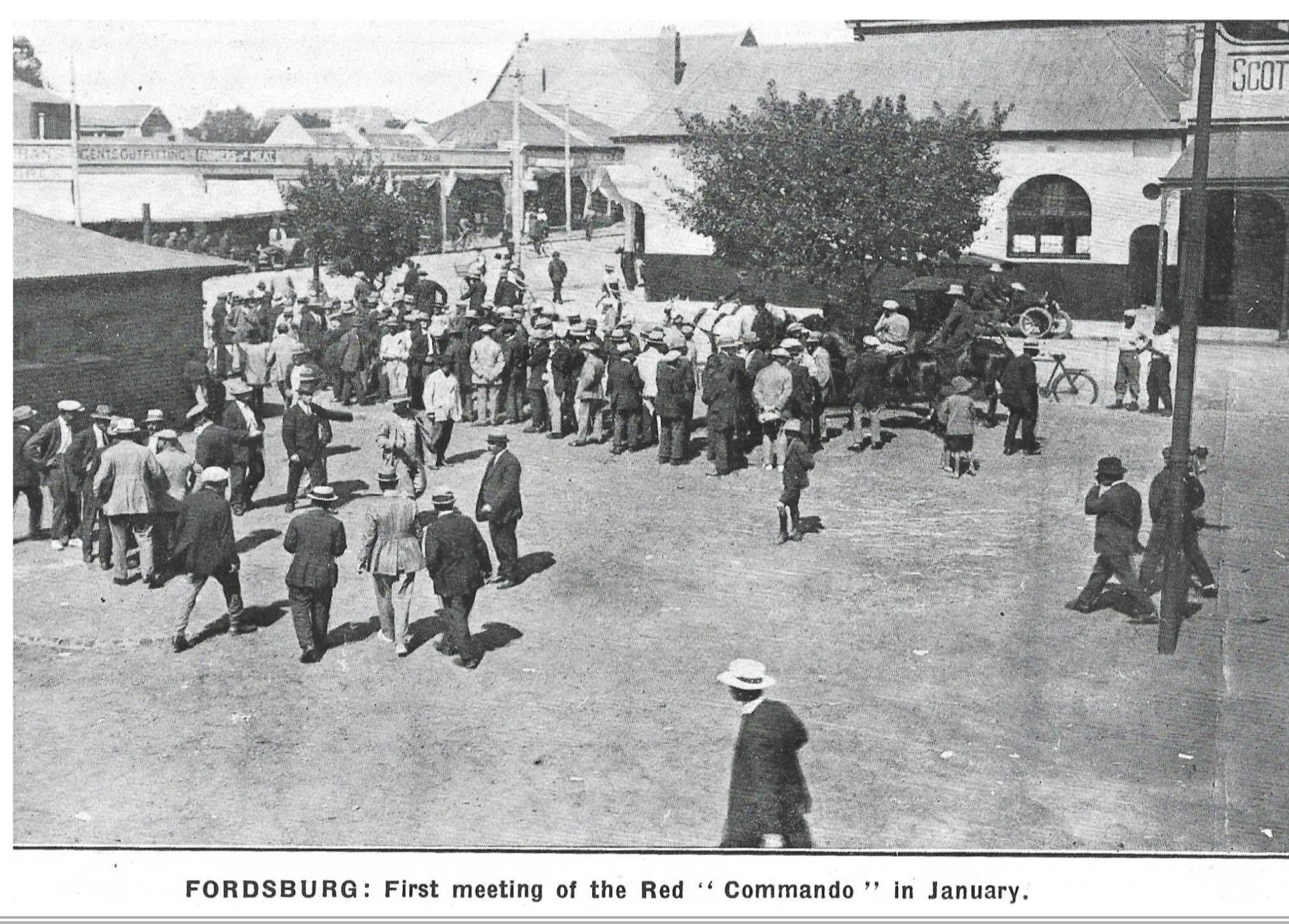
The first meeting of the Fordsburg strike commando in January.

Despite reassurances from Joe Thompson to South African Police officials that the commandos existed to assist the police in the potential event of a 'native' uprising, and that the commandos would remain lawful and peaceful unless provoked, incidents of violence caused by the commandos almost immediately began to occur.

On the night of 18 January, a group of approximately 40 strikers, all members of the strikers' Putfontein Commando, overpowered and disarmed 2 police officers guarding a mine's pump station. The strikers attempted to gain the loyalty of the two policemen, but when this failed, the strikers profusely apologized and unconditionally released the police officers. While many of the Augmented Executive claimed that these 40 strikers were not representative of their whole movement, Percy Fisher stated in a speech on 23 January 1922 that the strikers should have attacked more police positions instead of immediately letting the two captured officers go.

On 2 February 1922, instructions were issued by the Augmented Executive to local Strike Committees, ordering the latter to utilize the commandos in order to deal with "scabs" (non-striking White workers and all non-White workers), in whatever way was seen fit, no matter if it was by persuasion or force. The intimidation and assault of "scabs" then began all across the Witwatersrand region, with outnumbered police officers trying to protect the "scabs". Up until 3 February 1922, the police had only been armed with batons. After that date a quarter of all police on duty in the region were armed with rifles. Only three days later on 6 February 1922, the proportion of police armed with rifles was raised to half of all police in the region.

Percy Fisher continued to give speeches that called for violent action and for strikers to join their local commandos. Those strikers who refused to join a commando were publicly booed and jeered by their fellow strikers. At strike rallies, the theme of "Fighting for a White South Africa" became increasingly prominent, and banners with the phrase "Workers of the World, Unite and Fight for a White South Africa!" were carried by the strikers. On 6 February 1922, Fisher stated in a speech that "We are out to win this fight and by God we will, [even] if we have to raze Johannesburg to the ground."

The Communist Party of South Africa (CPSA), realizing that the Rand Lords would not give in to the strikers' demands, began recruiting strikers into the CPSA. Recruiters for the CPSA repeatedly and openly called on the strikers to achieve their demands through violent means, and after gaining sizable support from the strikers, the CPSA formed a 5-man 'Council of Action' led by Percy Fisher, with Harry Spendiff as Fisher's second-in-command. The three other members of the Council of Action (which was also referred to as the Committee of Action) were George Mason, Bill Andrews, and Ernest Shaw.

In the early stages of the strike, both the leadership of the Augmented Executive and the Council of Action publicly denounced violence against "scabs" and non-White South Africans in order to appease government officials, and had varying (but oftentimes little) actual belief in the racist ideas responsible for the initial strike, but both groups of leaders were willing to and did choose to use racist rhetoric in order to galvanize the White strikers (the strikers themselves being fully supportive of racist policies) into fighting for a "White South Africa". Various unprovoked attacks by the commandos against "native" non-White South Africans were justified by the commandos with the unfounded idea that the "natives" instigated such attacks as a part of a greater "native uprising" that was being backed by the Rand Lords.

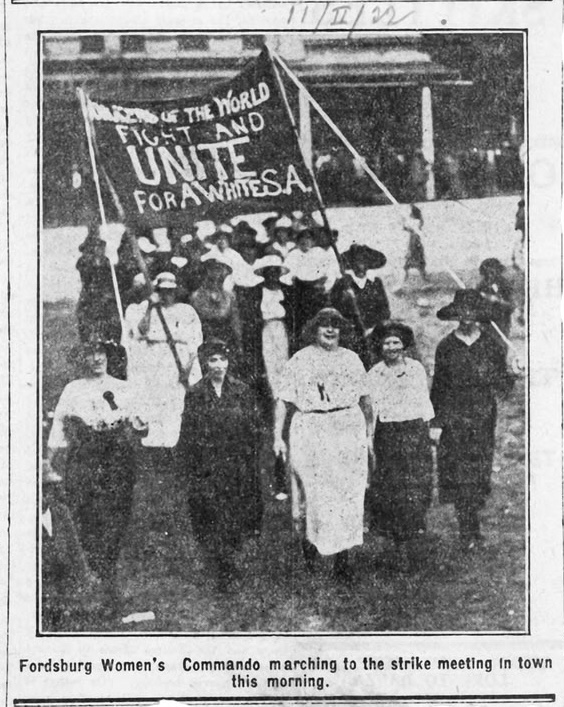
The Fordsburg Women's Commando carrying a banner with a White supremacist slogan.

On 8 February 1922, all five members of the Council of Action were arrested under the charge of inciting public violence against non-striking workers. There was vocal outrage from the strikers, but little violence actually occurred during this period, besides a few isolated incidents. One such incident was on 18 February 1922, when a large group of strikers occupied the Newlands Police Station and freed two strikers who had been placed in police custody. The police immediately retaliated and the two men were arrested again.

Percy Fisher and his Council of Action were released from custody on bail on 20 February 1922 (despite express opposition to this by the police) and incidents of violence, especially violence targeted towards "scabs" and mine officials, immediately increased in number.

At Brakpan on 27 February 1922, the police got into a clash with a commando, and while only batons and fists were used, a number of police were injured. At Driefontein Mine, a group of approximately 60 mounted strikers were caught trespassing on the mine's premises. The police dispersed the strikers and made 27 arrests, despite heavy protest from the strikers resulting in the injuries of 3 policemen. That evening, 700 Special Constables were mobilized to the outlying Johannesburg areas in order to allow regular police to focus on policing the busiest parts of Johannesburg. These Special Constables, or 'Blues' as they were nicknamed, had been recruited from Durban and not locally in order to ensure that the constables' loyalties remained firmly towards the government and its orders. The next day, on 28 February 1922, a large group of strikers demonstrated outside of Boksburg Prison (which was where the arrested strikers from the previous day were being held). The commanding officer, Captain Jock Fulford, twice requested that the crowd disperse, but was ignored on both occasions. Someone in the crowd of strikers opened fire on the police with a firearm whereupon Captain Fulford responded by firing warning shots above the heads of the strikers. A further five shots were fired from the crowd, seriously wounding police Captain Leishman and two other constables. Captain Fulford ordered one of his sections to fire four rounds into the crowd. Three strikers were killed and seven were injured, and the crowd immediately dispersed. While a later investigation and questioning of witnesses exonerated the police of any wrongdoing, the incident only angered the strikers even more.

Lieutenant Colonel R.S Godley of the South African Police immediately had a meeting with strike leaders in order to request a decrease in tensions, and Godley received assurances from the strike leaders that law and order would be maintained. On 2 March 1922, pamphlets were produced by both the Augmented Executive as well as the Council of Action, calling on their members to remain calm and avoid violence, but this contrasted with continued violence instigated by the commandos and strikers, as well as secret meetings which had later taken place between the Council of Action and the officers of the strike commandos. One such meeting took place on 3 March 1922 at the Johannesburg Trade Hall, where the strike officers were sworn to secrecy in the name of the future revolt under the threat of being shot.

On 1 March 1922, a large demonstration of strikers took place on the Union Grounds in Johannesburg.Strike Commandos attempted to intimidate workers at the City Deep Mine, but were driven away by armed mine officials and special police. Two days later, on 3 March, the Tramway Strike Commando was formed, and shots were exchanged between Strike Commandos and Special Police at City Deep Mine.

After the revolt had ended, an unnamed "general" of one of the strike commandos submitted an affidavit to the independent commission investigating the revolt, stating that on 5 March 1922, Percy Fisher and Harry Spendiff had approached him, asking if he knew that the Augmented Executive had handed over the powers to control the strike to the Council of Action. The general had said he had heard rumours about the transition of power, at which point Fisher and Spendiff chose to lie, falsely confirming to the general that the rumours were true. The two Council of Action members then asked the general if he wanted to become "Commander-In-Chief" of the strike commandos, to which the general responded with hesitancy, asking for time to think over the offer.

=== The strike under the Council of Action ===
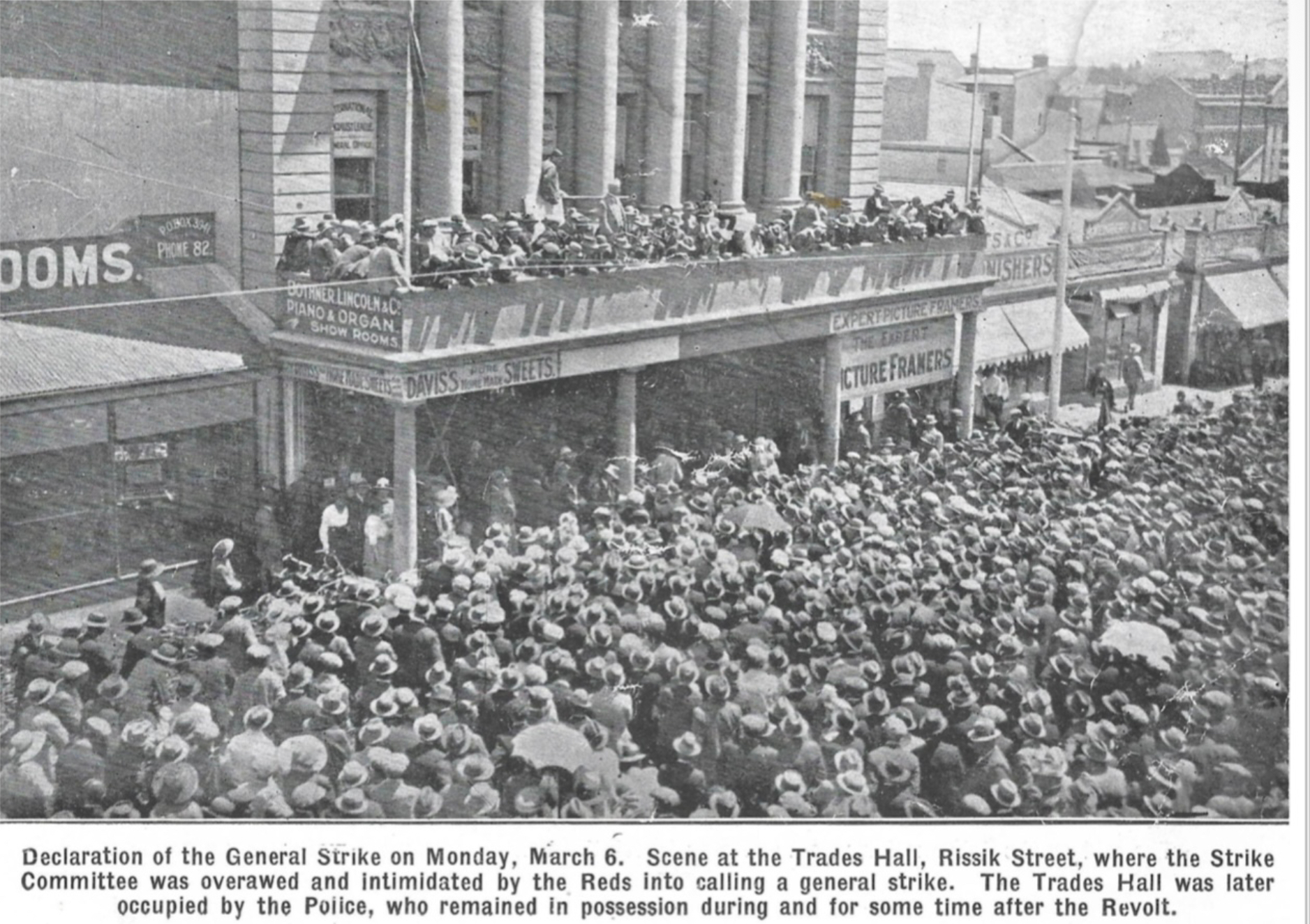
A photograph showing the Council of Action announcing a continued general strike after removing the Augmented Executive from power on March 6, 1922.

On 6 March 1922, the Augmented Executive and its Joint Executive gathered at the Rissik Street trade hall in order to consider a potential ballot regarding the status of the strike. Early into the meeting, commandos armed with revolvers and other weaponry stormed the building and trapped the representatives inside of the meeting room. The commandos insisted that no ballot should take place, and that the general strike should continue. At the same time, Percy Fisher and Bill Andrews addressed a crowd which had formed outside of the trade hall on the building's balcony, stating that power over the strike had been willingly given to the Council of Action by the Augmented Executive. What little control the Augmented Executive still had over the commandos (and by extension the strike) no longer existed, and full control of the commandos and strike was now in the possession of Percy Fisher, the Council of Action, and the CPSA.

On the same day, an aggressive crowd of 2000 strikers in Fordsburg were dispersed by a police unit under the command of Captain Kunhardt after members of the police were threatened with firearms and police Sergeant R.S Graham was cut in the face by a striker's makeshift weapon. Simultaneously, police had fired shots at a crowd of strikers setting fire to strikebreakers' and mine officials' homes at the East Rand Proprietary Mines. At the Witwatersrand Mine, several black workers were shot by a strike commando.

In most of these instances, crowds of civilian bystanders stood and watched the police take action, which sometimes hindered the police officers' ability to take effective action. Colonel C.N Anderson of the Permanent Force would later tell government officials that "Society is of the opinion that the police acts in a commendable manner, but also that they are hindered by agitated crowds and thousands of spectators." On 7 March, Colonel Godley would issue a command prohibiting the public from being within the vicinity of the strikers.

A general strike had been declared to take place on 7 March 1922 by the Council of Action. On the day that the general strike began, the strikers and their armed commandos began committing crimes across the Witwatersrand region. Individuals still working were forcibly removed from their working spaces and their businesses were closed, Non-White South Africans were attacked and killed in great numbers, Police were shot at, Businesses and homes were destroyed and looted, taxis and cars were hijacked, utilities and railway lines were destroyed, and mines were attacked with dynamite.

On 8 March 1922, a meeting between the commando officers and the Council of Action was held at the Johannesburg Trade Hall under the guise of forming a response to "native unrest". At the meeting, Fisher stated that there was no "native unrest", and then went on to discuss military plans for their upcoming revolt against the government. When one commando officer immediately tried to resign in disgust, the officer was forced to stay in his position after he was threatened with being shot.

The following day, on 9 March 1922, the strikers unsuccessfully attempted to sabotage the train line between Krugersdorp and Luipaardsvlei in order to capture and kill Jan Smuts, who was believed to be traveling via that railway line. Wolhulter Mine was besieged and shot at by strikers while in Sophiatown, two Black South Africans were killed. Furthermore, black South Africans in Ferreiratown and Marshall Square were harassed by strikers, while the Durban Light Infantry's mobilization offices in Benoni were burnt down.

== Declaration of Martial Law ==
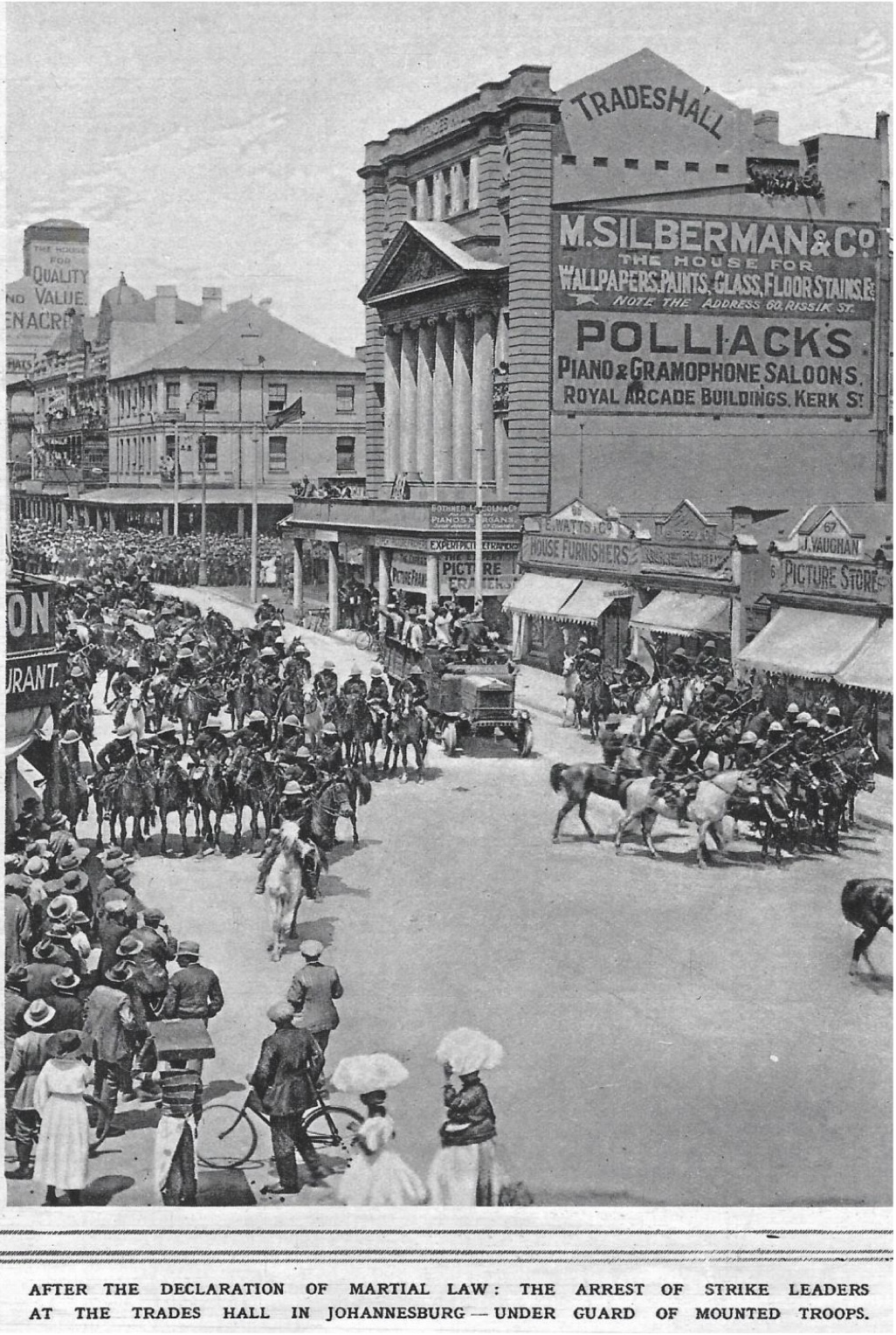
South African Police escorting prisoners after the Trades Hall raid.

Both Colonel Andersson and Colonel Godley had been rightly convinced that a widespread rebel attack on police positions in the Witwatersrand region would take place at any immediate moment, and they both knew that the regular police, Special Police, and Civic Guards would have to face the revolutionaries alone until (assuming that martial law was declared by then) the military reinforcements arrived. The two colonels had this knowledge because the South African Police's intelligence agency in the area, the Criminal Investigations Unit (commanded by Major Trigger), had been providing Godley's office with high quality information which revealed the entirety of the rebels' general plans of attack.

The Council of Action had ordered the Newlands, Maraisburg, and Langlaagte commandos to make a combined attack on the Newlands Police Station, with a separate rebel force holding Brixton Ridge. After Newlands Station was taken, the three rebel commandos would link up with the force at Brixton Ridge and attack the Auckland Police Station and the Special Police Camp at Cottesloe. Assuming that the revolutionaries would be successful in their objectives, the rebel force would then join up with the Fordsburg Commando, who in the meantime would be attacking Fordsburg Police Station. After this, the large rebel force would then have the aim of marching into Johannesburg and capturing the Town Hall.

Knowing this, Colonel Godley decided that the Police would have the objective of preventing the commandos from linking up, and that the police would have to control their stations for as long as possible. To keep the revolutionaries guessing the strength and movements of police units, Godley organized a system which the police would call "Mosquito Patrols". These patrols consisted of an officer and four men in motor-cars, each patrol being sent out from Marshall Square into varying directions. Any armed pickets or individuals encountered were arrested, and the officer in command of each patrol, who was issued a flare pistol, would then fire flares at random in order to confuse the revolutionary leadership. It would later be reported that these flares had the intended effect on the rebel leadership, who were unable to determine both the purpose of these patrols as well as the strength and movements of the Witwatersrand regions's police units.

As the situation in the Witwatersrand region continued to escalate, and after repeated requests for martial law from Colonels Godley and Andersson (which would give the police authority to properly respond to the strikers), Jan Smuts finally declared martial law at 09:00 AM on 10 March, a day which would later be referred to as "Black Friday" due to the high number of pro-government casualties sustained during the day.

As soon as the declaration of martial law was relayed to Colonel Godley in Johannesburg, Godley immediately ordered squads of police to take control of the post office, the telephone Exchange, and the Johannesburg Town Hall (where the police's position was reinforced by two Maxim machine guns). Simultaneously, Colonel Godley ordered Major Alfred Trigger and a large force of uniformed police officers and detectives to take the Trades Hall, with further orders to confiscate important strike documents and to arrest any participants or leadership of the strike found on the premises. Members of the Committee of Action had been in a meeting at the Communist Party Offices in the Trades Hall when the building had been raided, and due to a lack of pro-strike guards being placed outside of the Trades Hall, the police were able to arrest Bill Andrews, George Mason, Ernest Shaw, and six other party and trade union officials. At the Trades Hall, the evidence gathered from the raid included a list of prominent South Africans (such as the president of the Chamber of Mines and "all members of the Rand Club") who were to be summarily dealt with once the revolution had succeeded, as well as a judges gown, a black skull cap, and a red cap of liberty (as used in the French Revolution) which were to be worn by the man giving out sentences to those who appeared on the aforementioned list. The orders to undertake this raid was Godley's final decision in command, as since martial law was declared, the matter was now in the hands of the military, whom Godley promptly reported to. As a result of the raid, leadership over the strikers was split between Percy Fisher (with Spendiff as his second in command) and the local commando officers and generals (many of whom were Republican Nationalists, but who were involved in the rebellion with the hopes of eventually establishing a republic free of British influence). After this raid, there was little to no communication or coordination between officers within the revolutionary commandos' leadership, nor was there any between commando generals and Percy Fisher.

The sole newspaper sympathetic to the strikers, The Transvaal Post, was suppressed by the government under the authority of martial law, while all other newspapers in South Africa were in favour of martial law and government intervention.

The Pretoria Regiment, Imperial Light Horse regiment, the Transvaal Scottish regiment, Durban Light Infantry regiment, and the Transvaal Horse Artillery regiment had been mobilized to the area on 9 March in order to bolster the local South African Mounted Rifles and South African Police units, while government military units deployed on 10 March to enforce martial law included the Witwatersrand Rifles regiment, the Rand Light Infantry regiment, the South African Service Corps, and a sanitation section from the South African Medical Corps, as well as 26 local commandos from the areas surrounding the Witwatersrand region which were loyal to the government. Realizing in late February that the South African Air Force (SAAF) may be called upon to assist in the suppression of any revolt, the Director of Air Services, Colonel Pierre van Ryneveld, sought out civilian pilots to join the newly founded SAAF. Due to this foresight, the government then had trained pilots on standby to assist government forces if it was needed.

Once the declaration of Martial Law had been made public, citizens loyal to the government rallied to assist the authorities. The Transvaal Automobile Club and numerous private individuals provided motor-cars by the hundreds in order to maneuver and deploy government forces.

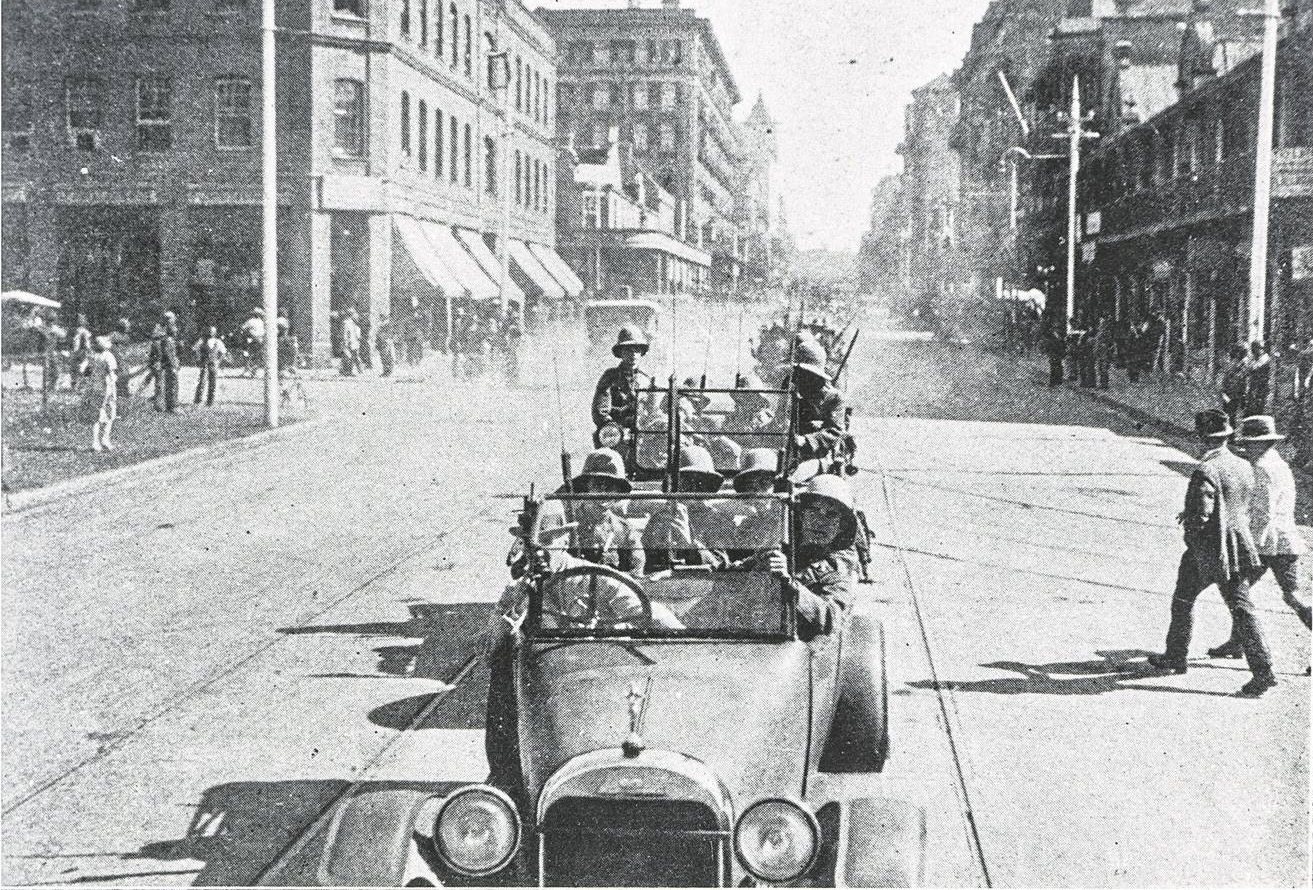
South African soldiers being deployed with help from civilian motorists during the Rand Revolt

== Initial engagements ==
=== Newlands ===
Unaware that martial law would be declared on the same day, a commando of strikers approached the Newlands Police Station in the early hours of 10 March and demanded its surrender. Sergeant Thomas Bell refused to hand over the station to the strikers, and the strikers in turn opened fire on the police. The Officer Commanding, Lieutenant Long, gave the order for the policemen to defend Newlands station, and the police officers then returned fire. During the attack, which lasted a few hours, improvised bombs and hand grenades were thrown at the policemen. Once the policemen's ammunition was finally depleted, Lieutenant Long ordered his men to stand down, and they were promptly captured by the rebels.

After finding out that Newlands Police Station was attacked, police officials ordered Lieutenant J.W Whyte and a unit of 40 police officers under his command to assist and relieve the defenders of Newlands Station. As the relief force made its way to the station, it was ambushed by emboldened rebels and two policemen were killed while three others were wounded. A civilian doctor soon approached the ambushed policemen under a White flag in order to treat the wounded, but while the doctor treated the wounded, the revolutionaries advanced onto the police's positions and immediately disarmed and captured the officers. This "reckless abuse" of the White flag (as newspapers at the time described it) was widely criticized, and the incident served to make the revolutionaries increasingly unpopular amongst most White South Africans. A truce was then agreed upon between the two forces, on the condition that both sides maintained their positions and obtained no reinforcements. Before being taken prisoner, Lieutenant Whyte had sent out a request for reinforcements, and upon receiving this request, Godley ordered Captain Jack Carruthers with "J" Squadron, and Major Southy Hutcheons with "F" Squadron and a Maxim machine gun crew to relieve the ambushed policemen and to prevent the commandos from entering Johannesburg "at all costs".

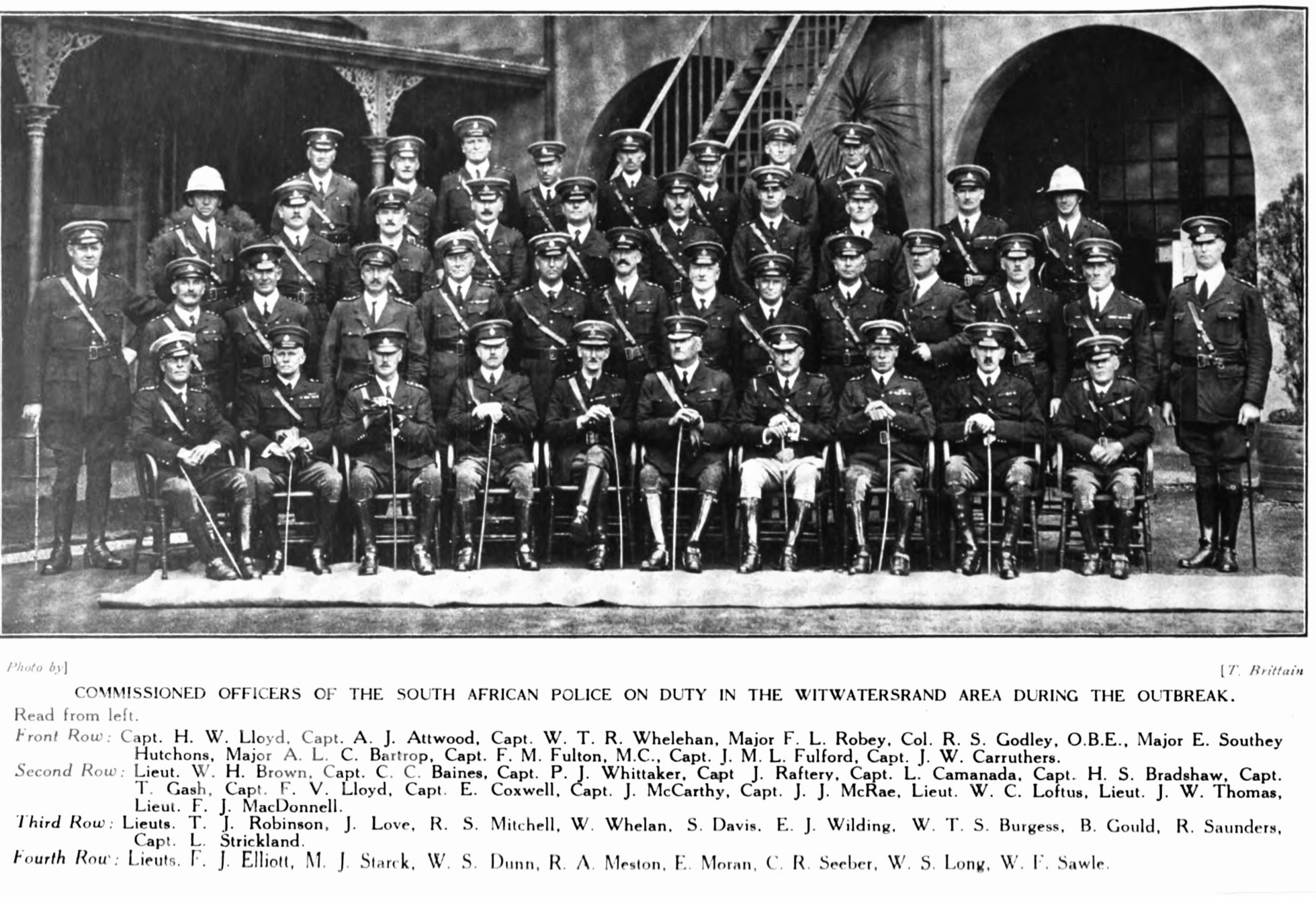
A group photo of SAP officers involved in the 1922 Rand Revolt

Having spotted "J" Squadron, Lieutenant Whyte was then granted permission from the rebel commando officer in charge, a man named Viljoen, to leave the surrounded policemen's positions and inform the relief force about the ongoing truce and to send them away from the area. Having been halted and informed of the situation on the main road opposite an Asian-owned shop, Captain Carruthers sent Lieutenant Baston as a dispatch runner to Marshall Square, as it was believed that Baston could explain the situation to the police leadership "more lucidly and intelligently" than a regular policeman. Commandant Viljoen and a captured police sergeant (who was taken to ensure the Commandant's safe passage), soon arrived in order to see what had been going on. While Viljoen was kept busy, Lieutenant Whyte had wanted to return to his surrounded men, but was dissuaded by Carruthers, who in the meantime had used this truce as an opportunity to send one troop of "J" Squadron to the ridge behind the police's current position in order to serve as a rearguard and scouting party. "F" Squadron was soon spotted by this rearguard troop, and Carruthers sent a recently returned Baston to inform Hutcheons of the situation and to request that "F" Squadron remain behind the ridge until further notice.

A lorry occupied by policemen had been spotted by Carruthers' men, and when Commandant Viljoen was questioned on this by Carruther, the commando officer stated that he had sent them out to obtain food. This excuse was initially taken at face value, but it was later evident that these policemen were in fact prisoners being escorted to entrenched revolutionary positions. After giving this explanation, Viljoen left and rejoined his Commandos, while Carruthers met with Hutcheons to discuss the situation.

During this subsequent period of waiting, Carruthers received word from multiple pro-government civilians that the Newlands Commando had around 1200 combatants, and that these revolutionaries occupied the entire semi-circling ridge system in front of "J" Squadron, as well as many houses between Brixton and Newlands. Despite the apparent truce, members of "J" Squadron had seen rebel commandos slowly advancing in an attempt to envelop "J" Squadron's right flank. As the police continued waiting, multiple groups of black and coloured South Africans from the surrounding settlements approached the police in order to request protection from the rebels. Carruthers would respond to these groups by promising them that they would "not be deserted" and that in the meantime they should remain quietly in their homes.

Under a Red Cross, a member of the Newlands Commando approached the police from Newlands via motorcycle, and reported to the policemen that "the coloured people of Sophiatown and the vicinity intended attacking the commandos that night" and then explained that he was there to request cooperation from the police in dealing with the alleged threat. Carruthers, who had received several deputations earlier that afternoon from the local black and Coloured communities, outright rejected this proposal from the commando Red Cross representative. Carruthers correctly believed that the idea of a "native attack" was a ruse used with the intention of luring the policemen into rebel positions at Newlands.

At 6 PM that evening, after getting no new orders from police headquarters, Carruthers withdrew "J" Squadron to the ridge where Hutcheons' "F" Squadron was situated. Three troops of "F" Squadron and the maxim crew, under the command of Captain Coxwell, occupied the ridge to the south of, and which overlooked, the main road between Brixton and Newlands, while the fourth troop of "F" Squadron under the local command of Lieutenant Robinson was positioned on a smaller ridge overlooking the Auckland Park racecourse, and to the north of the main road where it emerged from Brixton. The policemen noted in later reports that the telephone wires along this road had been cut in numerous places by the rebels.

Constable J.J Geldenhuis was sent in the direction of Brixton in order to buy bread from the first possible shop for the police force, but he was shot in the head and killed by a man who had been sitting on the 'stoep' of an adjacent house. The police immediately searched the house, but found it to be vacant. The mounted policemen withdrew their horses and left them in better cover inside a basin behind the front ridge, while Lieutenant Robinson's position was strengthened. One troop of "J" squadron was posted to the front ridge with the maxim while the other three troops of "J" squadron were moved to the back ridge overlooking Langlaate railway station.

No action took place that night, but the next day, on 11 March, large numbers of armed men were seen by the police running from house to house, approaching the police's position before entering the premises of an extensive brick-field which was immediately opposite to and 500 yards from the position of the police maxim machine gun. The policemen did not open fire, as they did not know what was happening in other areas and they did not want to be the first to break the apparent truce which the rebels had enforced upon them.

At some time just after 7 AM, the revolutionaries in the brick fields (who numbered around 200 combatants) and revolutionaries at Auckland Park racecourse and the houses in Newlands, opened fire on the policemen. The rebels reportedly had multiple "remarkable" marksmen who Carruthers would later report had given the police "a great deal of trouble". The rebels focused their fire primarily on the Maxim gun position.

At around 10:30 AM, Lieutenant Whyte was shot by a sniper, the bullet entering the side of his throat and emerging from behind the left shoulder. It was noted by the police that the revolutionaries used dum-dum and soft-nosed bullets, both of which had been banned at the 1899 Hague Convention. Constable D.J van Heerden, a member of the Maxim section, was shot through the head and then dragged to safety under immense fire by Constable P.J Botha.

As a result of these casualties, it became imperative to obtain an ambulance and medical aid for the wounded. Detective Meehan was dispatched by Major Hutcheons on a bicycle for this purpose, but the detective was turned back by rebel pickets at Brixton. Lieutenant Baston and Constable G.P Trout, under a red cross flag, attempted to reach a nearby motorcycle that they could use to get an ambulance from Johannesburg, but both were fired at by the rebels and eventually had to return to cover. Three Coloured men from the nearby Newclare Township went directly to Carruthers and volunteered to try and run a message through to Police positions at Marshall Square. Carruthers, with no other option, accepted their help and verbally gave the trio the following message which he had the trio repeat until all three could explain it by memory:

11.3.22, 9.30 AM. Colonel Godley, Marshall Square. Holding ridge town side of Native Western Township near Brixton. Engaged since 7 AM under heavy rifle fire from commandos in apparent strength. No food, no water, men and horses since leaving Show Ground morning 10th. Ammunition running low, cannot replenish, urgent assistance essential with provisions, food, men and horses, and ammunition. Aeroplane could readily bomb attacking forces in brick fields front of position. Send ambulance, Lieut. Whyte and Constable van Heerden wounded.

The message was actually sent at 11.30 AM, but all three Coloured men managed to reach Marshall Square with their messages.

Constable C.W van der Westhuizen was sent unarmed in the direction of Langlaagte railway station in an attempt to get an ambulance. He returned shortly and reported that he had been stopped by rebel Commandant der Villiers and his commando, who promised to send an ambulance, with the added lie that 15000 rebels surrounded the policemen and that they and Auckland Park station were the last holdouts of police resistance. An ambulance party with two stretchers eventually came from the direction of Langlaagte railway station, and a second ambulance party soon arrived afterwards from Johannesburg. Lieutenant Whyte and Constable Van Heerden were moved to the General Hospital, but Van Heerden died on the way there. The rebel red cross team jeered the police, and made veiled threats towards the policemen which they said would happen if the police did not surrender. As Whyte and Van Heerden were evacuated to Johannesburg, their ambulance was halted by a group of rebels, who threatened to pull out and shoot the men inside if it turned out that they were government forces. One of the doctors inside of the ambulance would later explain that a rebel opened the backdoor of the ambulance, saw that the wounded man was Lieutenant Whyte, and then immediately shut the door closed, saying to the other rebels that "it's alright boys" before ordering the ambulance to proceed.

The volume of fire increased during the afternoon but the sounds of gunshots slowly died out as it became night. Constable J. Olivier and a few others had managed to get a bucket and a half of water under heavy fire, while two black South African men brought the policemen a paraffin tin with water. A Chinese man, who was reportedly "in an appalling state of fright" successfully crawled for three quarters of a mile towards the police positions in order to bring the policemen two tins of sardines, one tin of salmon, and a few packets of cigarettes.

Each policeman had only 50 rounds, but Major Hutcheons decided that the police would fight on until their ammunition was expended, at which point they would affix bayonets to their rifles and attempt to break through rebel positions to reach government lines. At around 3 AM, Constable H.W Van Heerden was killed by a rebel sniper.

Aeroplanes had been seen during the day circling and reconnoitering the policemen's position and their surroundings, but the police were unsure if the planes had seen them. That night, the Maxim machine gun was removed from the front ridge to the rear ridge of the police's position, with Major Hutcheons and Lieutenant Baston taking command there. Captains Carruthers and Coxwell remained at the front ridge, while Robinson remained in the isolated position which he and his men had held the entire time at a minor ridge by the end of Brixton.

Other than sporadic sniper fire, there was no fighting until 3:20 AM on 12 March, where then the rebels opened fire with everything they had, including a machine gun. This attack had little affect, with only one policeman (Constable H.W Van Heerden) killed, two wounded, and several horses killed. The rebels used the immense fire to approach police positions, but as a result of accurate and effective police fire, ended up being stuck in between the rebel lines and the police's position. After daybreak, a rebel Commandant and twenty men (who had been stuck in the middle) surrendered to Lieutenant Robinson, while other rebels who had been stuck attempted to flee towards rebel positions without their arms, only for some of them to be shot while fleeing.

An aeroplane appeared at around 6:30 AM and dropped several copies of the following message above the policemen's position:

"A combined attack is being made today to relieve you. Hold on. Minister of Defence admires your pluck and endurance, and every nerve is being strained so that your splendid effort will not be in vain."

This message was rapidly circulated amongst the police, and it greatly increased the morale of the policemen as a result.

At 8:30 AM, six aeroplanes of the SAAF appeared and dropped large quantities of ammunition and bread directly onto police positions, the former being particularly welcome as the policemen had been running out of ammunition at this stage. The aeroplanes then dropped bombs on and strafed rebel positions with Lewis machine guns.

The revolutionary Red Cross teams had visited the policemen's position that morning, asking if the surrounded police had any wounded, only to appear physically disappointed when told that the police had few casualties.

Early in the afternoon at around 2 PM, the relief force was spotted advancing under heavy rebel fire from the racecourse and the brick-fields. By 3 PM, the policemen were relieved, and at 5 PM the men evacuated their positions and returned to government lines. Shortly before the policemen left, two badly wounded black South African men were brought to them, the two men having been attacked by the revolutionaries.

The police casualties at Newlands were two men killed, one man died of wounds, and three men wounded, out of a force of six officers and 195 men. The revolutionaries had approximately 2500 to 2600 combatants surrounding the police, and while it is unknown how many rebels became casualties, the number is believed to be high.

=== Brakpan and the Brakpan Massacre ===
On the morning of 10 March, the manager of Brakpan mine, C.D Brodigan, received word that a rebel commando was approaching his mine. With only "a handful" of Special Police constables and 25 mine officials (the latter armed with outdated revolvers and Martini-Henry rifles), C Brodigan, after being optimistically told by his brother Lieutenant Vincent Brodigan that a police relief force would arrive, decided that they would defend the mine from the rebel attack for as long as they could.

As the White police and mining officials were discussing the situation, an Induna (a headman who represented the Black workers in discussions with their White bosses) entered the room and told the White men that their black workers, who numbered around 100, were announcing that they were going to break out of the mine compound and fight the strikers using makeshift spears. With assistance from their mine managers and Indunas, the mine officials successfully de-escalated the situation, convincing the black workers to remain inside the compound.

While this was taking place, the rebel commandos led by John Garnsworthy (who were 150 in number but whom only 50 were armed with rifles) had advanced onto the mine entrance under a White flag, only to be challenged at the entrance by a Special Police constable. A parlay between Garnsworthy and this officer then ensued, and after Garnsworthy returned to his commando, he explained in a loud voice that: "I asked the officer to surrender, but he said he wouldn't! Then I said to the officer, I'll fight you!" The officer had said it was alright and the two men agreed to shake hands on this promise.

Garnsworthy would later testify that he had asked C Brodigan (who was now at the entrance with the other defenders) if he could address everyone who was in the mine. The mine manager refused, stating that if Garnsworthy or any rebels entered the mine, they would be shot. C. Brodigan believed that the rebels were seemingly drunk, and as a result he thought that no negotiations would be fruitful. Garnsworthy gave C Brodigan 10 minutes to reconsider, and after these 10 minutes passed, the rebels who were armed opened fire and advanced towards the entrance, while those rebels without rifles were ordered to hide behind some nearby cottages.

During the short negotiations, Lieutenant Vincent Brodigan ordered his forces to retire deeper into the Mine to less exposed positions. At around 8:30 AM, the fighting began, and it would later be reported that the rebels used improvised bombs and grenades during the fight. The underground manager and a sampler, C.K Pitt and J.L Rowe, received scalp wounds early into the fighting. Mine officials M.T Cook, Steuart Falkiner, and H Martin were all also wounded by bullets.

The cottages mentioned prior belonged to mine staff, who lived with their families near the mines. The families of these mine officials, most of whom were women and children, were ordered out of their houses, all the while rebels stated that their houses would be burnt down. The group of women and children initially attempted to head towards the mine's main entrance, but were turned away by armed rebels under the threat of being shot. The group then slowly headed to the mine's native hospital under indiscriminate fire, a stray bullet of which hit one of the children, Mervyn Ball, in the leg. The 20 children in the group were put to bed on the floor of the hospital, while the women nervously stood inside the hospital, waiting for the gunfire to die down. After a while of waiting, a man soon entered the ward and stated that "There has been a mass murder down at the mine."

After resisting the rebel attack for an hour, the defenders of Brakpan mine ran out of ammunition. A special police sergeant waved a White flag affixed to his bayonet, signaling their surrender. The rebels immediately captured the surrendering men, several rebels surrounding the mine manager C Brodigan. One rebel threatened the manager with a bayonet, while another hit C Brodigan over the back of his head with the butt of a rifle. One of the more moderate rebels asked his comrade why he hit an old man after he surrendered, to which the comrade responded with "He should have his head bashed in." A commando officer then ordered two unarmed rebels to take the captured mine manager to a safer area.

In the Mine Office, three unnamed mine officials, an unnamed Black worker, and an unnamed special police constable were executed by rebels despite being unarmed and captured. Furthermore, a shaft clerk known as Phillips was found by rebels using a telephone in an attempt to call for help. A rebel demanded Phillips' watch and chain, and while Phillips' was handing them over, a second rebel shot Phillips in the back, killing him. Mine official G.W Lowden was kneeling beside M.T Cook and dressing the latter man's wounds when a rebel shot a dumdum bullet into the back of Lowden's head, killing Lowden immediately. Another rebel fired a shot at Cook, who pretended to be dead, the bullet having only singed him. Mine Captain Dennison was beaten on the head by rebels, but was saved by a rebel who had worked under Dennison as a miner. Lieutenant Vincent Brodigan and 2 other special police constables were taken to the transformer house and executed by rebels. Edwin Turton, a trader involved in the rebel assault on Brakpan mine, would later testify that he witnessed other rebels looting the dead defenders and destroying the defenders' furniture. When Edwin tried to stop this, he was pushed away from the scene, a rebel telling him that "If you are in sympathy with the scabs, you will be treated the same." The rebels then set mattresses on fire and placed them in the room where the wounded and dead defenders of Brakpan Mine were being kept. Edwin removed the mattresses from the room, and when he then tried to summon a doctor from a nearby settlement, the revolutionaries turned him away. 23 of the defenders were wounded, while 9 were summarily executed, out of a total of 39 defenders.

When the fighting was over, the women and children were told that they could return to their homes, which contrary to what the rebels had said previously, had not been burned down. Some of the women later testified that the strikers shot at their houses windows despite knowing that the women and children were inside.

The commando was ordered to then assault the nearby V.F.P Power Plant, which was defended by machine guns which covered the only route the commandos could take to reach the power plant. The rebels then ordered the women and children to form up on the road in front of them, with the idea that the rebels would use these civilians as human shields during the assault. Soon however, an SAAF aircraft flew overhead and dropped leaflets announcing that a relief force was being sent to the mine. The strikers, discouraged by this message, fired a few shots at the aircraft and then left the mine.

=== Brixton Ridge ===
Brixton Ridge was a long and curved hill which formed across the western landscape of Johannesburg and flattened out towards the South. The revolutionaries had occupied the cottages which were spread out across the Ridge's southern face and set up defensive strongholds in the surrounding settlements of Fordsburg, Mayfair, Langlaagte, Vrededorp, Newlands, and Greymont.

Near midnight of Wednesday 8 March, a small group of Active Citizen Force men (serving with the Transvaal Horse Artillery) left their homes in the eastern suburbs and, under the command of Sergeant W.L Paddon, made their way to battery headquarters at Auckland Park. At Jeppe this small force was fired upon, and when they came up from Braamfontein towards the showgrounds, they came across a large group of strikers on patrol. The strikers had an assortment of weapons, which included but was not limited to firearms, bicycle chains fastened to short sticks, and clubs with long nails driven through the heads. After a while of waiting, the patrol of strikers left towards the direction of Newlands, not spotting the small group of reservists as they went. Paddon's squad arrived at Auckland Park in the early hours of Thursday morning on 9 March. Once Paddon and his squad arrived, they were tasked with composing messages to other members of the regiment, summoning them to service. Several of the men at the headquarters carried revolvers, but there was only one rifle (which happened to have a defect in the barrel), which was handed out with 5 rounds of ammunition to the man on sentry duty. Before dawn, the men at the battery headquarters were woken up by the sound of marching outside and the repetition of "Links, Regs; Links, Regs" ("Left, Right" in english). Later that day the men of battery headquarters would discover that a rebel commando had passed them, as well as a nearby and thinly guarded Special Police tent that contained hundreds of rifles and large stocks of ammunition (a cache which the men of battery headquarters were unaware of at the time).

Throughout the day, mobilized men and reservists trickled into the camp, including non-mobilized volunteers from other regiments, veterans from previous conflicts, and several volunteers from the Union Reserve of Officers who had not been mobilized. Major Fritz Adler, who was the officer commanding of Transvaal Horse Artillery, faced difficulties equipping his men and the many volunteers. The shells for the four 13 pounder guns had not yet arrived, and he lacked enough officers to create gun subsections and infantry squads. Eventually, it was pointed out to Major Adler that many of unmobilized volunteers either held a commissioned rank or had held a commissioned rank at some stage, and while this fixed the problem of finding officers, Major Adler still faced the issue of equipping them, as most arrived in civilian clothes. In the case of one volunteer, an ex-lifeguard known as Leech, he walked down the road from Auckland Park to the Country Club (where he lived at the time) and returned to Major Adler in a full Lieutenant's uniform.

By 10 March, three separate units were encamped on the town-side slope of Brixton Ridge. The T.H.A was positioned at their headquarters on the right facing the ridge, A detachment of special police had been deployed on the open ground a short distance to the left, while a number of regular policemen occupied a depot south of the artillery headquarters on the right and closer to the ridge. Early that morning, Major Adler was ordered to send one of the guns to the East Rand, and this gun left the battery headquarters at 10 AM under the command of an officer with 22 men. The gun itself was towed by a lorry, and before making their way to the East Rand, the detachment stopped at the Drill Hall in Johannesburg to collect 48 rounds of ammunition and an additional armed escort from Vogelfontein. Adler's intelligence reported heavy rebel activity in Brixton, so he had his men equipped with Short Magazine Lee Enfield rifles from the nearby Special Police weapons cache and then deployed his men to defensive positions on his Eastern, Southern, and Western flanks.

On that same morning, a force of strikers marched onto the Ridge by going through Vrededorp, and then spread out along the ridge in small groups. Commandant Piet Erasmus then addressed the rebel force, informing them that martial law had been declared and that "Martje Louw" was on his way, the latter joke statement causing laughter amongst the rebels. This rebel force had been equipped with various rifles, although one rebel would later testify that they also had a machine gun, which they had managed to cobble together after looting a municipal stores building in Vrededorp (although it is unclear what happened to the machine gun after that). A small section of rebels from Fordsburg who were a part of the Knobkerrie commando positioned themselves on the second floor classroom in the northwest corner of Cottesloe School, which was built on the ridge.

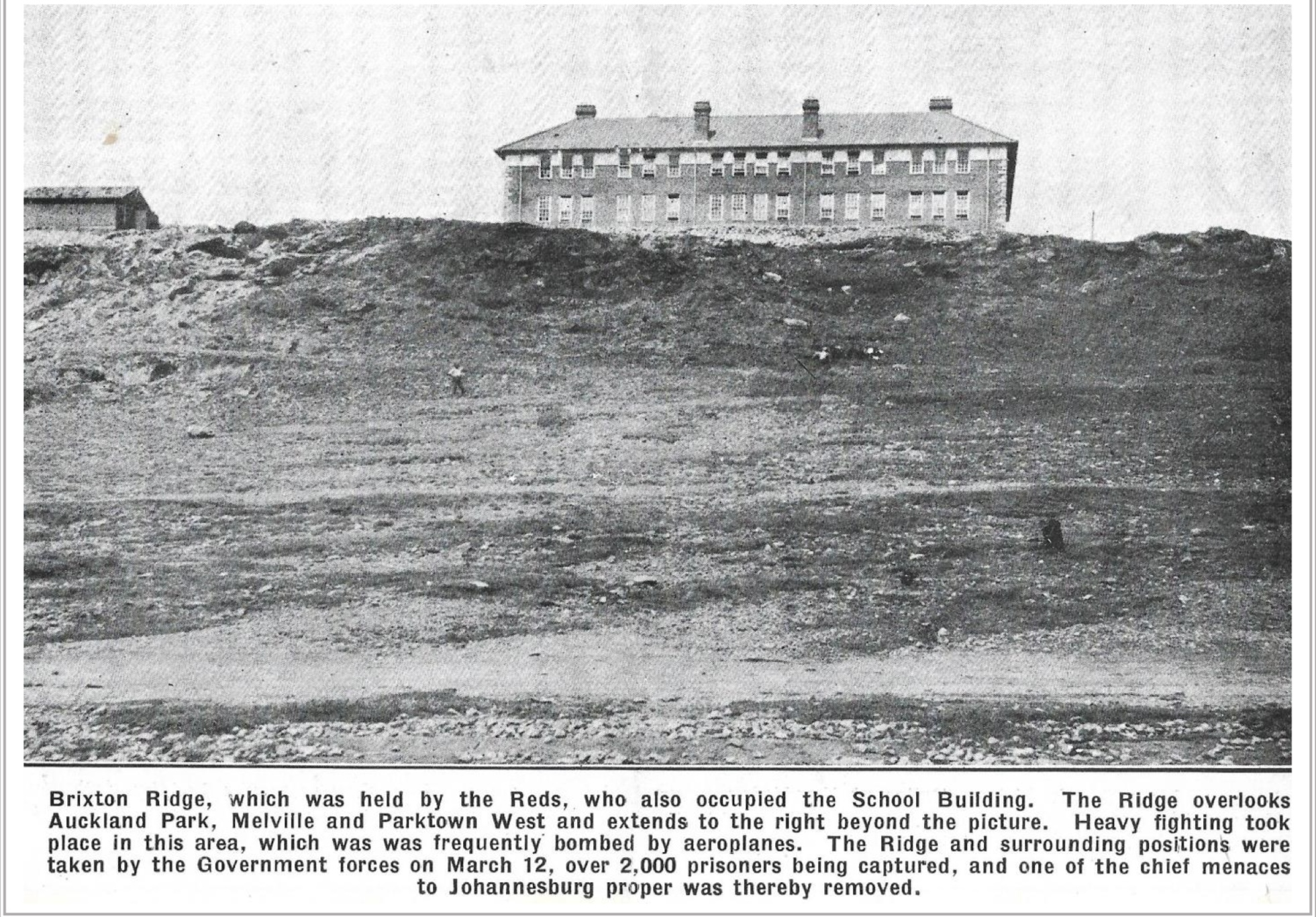
Brixton Ridge and Cottesloe School during the Rand Revolt, 1922

Another rebel detachment took up positions in the Milner Park Junior School, which was built off of the slope by Braamfontein. A third rebel body was reported to have positioned themselves in a cottage on the corner of the cemetery directly opposite the junior school.

Once they had positioned themselves, the rebels did nothing for several hours until sometime close to 4 PM. It was reported that one rebel, unable to handle the fact that they were doing nothing, raised his rifle and fired a single shot down the slope at government positions, which caused the rest of the rebel force to open fire as well. Major Adler would later disagree with this explanation of events, believing that the attack was premeditated as the rebel objective was to attack government positions. Two gunners of the T.H.A were killed and a third one was wounded, while the special police (who were in an exposed position) took heavier losses. The government forces returned fire, and after a short skirmish, the rebels began raising red cross flags across the ridge, indicating that they wanted to collect their wounded and dead. The government forces ceased firing, and both sides stayed in their positions until the next day. That evening, a troop from the Imperial Light Horse arrived to reinforce the battery headquarters. Major Adler was ordered to take command of all troops in the Brixton Ridge area, and while he considered an attack on the ridge that night, he did not follow through with this plan as he feared he did not have the adequate strength required for such an assault.

Throughout Saturday, 11 March 1922, government units came to reinforce the defenders of Brixton, while rebels took shots at any movement that was spotted. It was decided by Adler to evacuate the girls (who were living in the Diocesan Hostel south east of the battery headquarters), as he feared that they may be caught in the crossfire of any battle which could possibly take place. In the early evening staff from St Mary's Cathedral arrived with a lorry to evacuate the girls, but the strikers opened fire on the lorry, forcing the Cathedral officials to take cover. Eventually, the civilian girls were successfully evacuated with no casualties, and the hostel was then occupied by Lieutenant A.G Lewis of the T.H.A and 25 men.

A. Keith Chesterton (a reporter for The Star newspaper) was sent by acting news editor Don Urquhart to report on the fighting at Brixton Ridge. Chesterton then set out for Parktown in a car belonging to The Star, intending to follow the attack with the Durban Light Infantry. When Chesterton reached the D.L.I's positions, he was pulled from his car and searched by the soldiers, who were warned about potential spies. Discovering Chesterton's revolver, the soldiers were convinced that the reporter was a spy and that he should be immediately executed. Chesterton, having served under Colonel George Molyneux of the Durban Light Infantry during World War One, convinced the soldiers to take him to the colonel before they made a mistake. Colonel Molyneux, upon sighting Chesterton being frogmarched towards him under heavy armed guard, yelled: "What are you idiots doing with Chesterton!?" Chesterton then explained his situation to the colonel, who in turn told Chesterton that he needed officers, and who then asked if Chesterton would be willing to serve as an officer in the upcoming assault. Chesterton agreed, and he and an acquaintance then broke into the premises of a nearby theater company where props and costumes were being stored. Finding a khaki drill uniform and a helmet, Chesterton reported to the colonel within the hour he had been sent off at.

Major Adler then handed over command to Colonel Edward Francis Thackeray, the latter of whom then planned an assault on the ridge for the next day, Sunday on March 12. Unlike Adler, Thackeray believed he had ample strength to perform the assault, as the battery headquarters had been reinforced by several A.C.F units, including the Durban Light Infantry (which had moved out of Parktown earlier that morning). Consisting of the Durban Light Infantry, the Witwatersrand Rifles, the Rand Light Infantry, the Imperial Light Horse, units from the S.A.M.R, and the reserve detachment of the Transvaal Scottish, the attack took place on March 12, beginning at the showground area above Auckland Park.

The main infantry assault force attacked the ridge from the right, while a section of the Transvaal Scottish under the command of Lieutenant and South African cricketer Manfred Julius Susskind would attack through a valley on the left. The section of Transvaal Scottish faced heavy fire, and three men were killed, including Black Watch Major (although serving as a Transvaal Scottish Private) R.B Ovens, who was shot in the heart. Lieutenant Susskind was shot in the head, but his cap badge deflected the bullet. Susskind's fellow international cricketer, Eiulf Peter Nupen was shot in both knees and fell into a ditch. Of the 25 or 26 men who had gone through the valley, only 3 got out unwounded.

SAAF aircraft were deployed in the assault, and dropped bombs on the striker's positions in the direction of Sophiatown and Newlands. In the depression and the koppies north and east of the ridge, the larger government force was gaining a foothold on the striker's left flank. Government snipers, positioned in trees, slowly picked off rebels on the ridge as the assault force advanced. The rebels positioned on the second floor of Cottesloe school reported movement close to a White building (the aforementioned Diocesan Hostel) in a hollow at Parktown directly opposite them. One rebel raised a telescope to get a better look, and then quickly turned back to face his comrades, reporting that it was government soldiers setting up an artillery gun. This 13-pounder gun (and the other two 13 pounders) soon opened fire, the gunner crews firing over open sights. One of the 13-pounders opened fire at the Cottesloe school, scoring a hit on the corner of the second floor. The knobkerrie rebels, certain that the school was on fire as a result of the shelling, evacuated from their positions in the school and took up positions in the nearby outbuildings. By the time the fighting at Brixton would finish, at least 34 shells had been fired into the ridge, the use of artillery having caused a heavy drop in morale amongst the rebels.

When the main government assault force charged up the right flank of the long koppie, the rebel positions almost immediately began to collapse. Having successfully taken the summit of the ridge, the assault force began firing at the remaining rebels on the ridge (as well as the rebels in the outbuildings) with heavy machine gun and rifle fire. The commandos and strikers then began to surrender, around 1700 revolutionaries in total being captured by the government assault force, before being sent to a temporary prisoner of war camp near the battery headquarters.

The Durban Light Infantry, after having helped take the ridge, maneuvered towards Newlands, where they came upon a detachment of 30-40 regular policemen (belonging to "J" and "L" Squadrons) who had been there since Friday. The detachment of policemen were hungry and tired, and had already lost two officers and three men to sniper fire. The D.L.I continued their advance, and after facing no resistance in the area, escorted the policemen to their headquarters. The I.L.H and S.A.M.R moved to the koppies North of Newlands and routed the strong rebel holdouts which were strung out across the slopes near Brixton. By the early afternoon, Brixton Ridge and its satellite koppies were under government control, allowing for an assault on rebel-held Fordsburg.

=== Dunswart and Benoni ===
On 9 March, the Transvaal Scottish Regiment initially had difficulties mobilizing its men, as the East Rand was held by the rebels and the mobilization centers in Johannesburg were harried by strikers. The battalion's two West Rand platoons were driven by motor transport to the Drill Hall under the command of Lieutenants McCalgan and Ross. The two lieutenants had then been sent to Krugersdorp with a small force with orders to reinforce the Police post there and then collect the Roodepoort and Krugersdorp platoons, which they did without any difficulties. Having been warned that the Fordsburg Commando planned to ambush them along the Main Road on their return journey, the Transvaal Scottish avoided this threat by maneuvering through the town of Fordsburg itself. Upon returning to the Drill Hall, the platoon sergeant of the Roodepoort platoon announced that his platoon mobilized in protest, and that they had no interest in fighting the strikers. While the sergeant was demobilized and kept under armed guard for the entirety of the Rand Revolt, the rest of the platoon reportedly did "magnificent work" in the service of their government. For the rest of 9 March, the Transvaal Scottish would assist in furnishing garrisons at Robinson Deep, Simmer Pan, and Rosherville Power Station.

On 10 March, as a result of the Transvaal Scottish being the strongest Active Citizen Force unit in the area at that time, the Transvaal Scottish were ordered to deploy to Benoni, where they were then meant to relieve the Benoni police station. Leaving behind 250 men at the Drill Hall who could not be equipped in time, the remaining Transvaal Scottish (under the command of experienced officer Lieutenant Colonel Donald McLeod) got on a train and began their journey to Benoni. During the train ride, the police at Vogelfontein station managed to report to the Transvaal Scottish that a railway line had been potentially sabotaged at Avenue Halt. In response to this report, a party of Transvaal Scottish under the command of an engineer officer was then ordered to precede the train and examine the railway lines.

As the train approached Dunswart Station at around 14:00, fifteen armed mounted men of the rebels' Putfontein Commando were spotted leaving the railway line. The rebels then opened fire from the orchards, cottages, and the Dunswart Steelworks on both sides of the railway line, as well as from positions in front of the train. Four platoons of Transvaal Scottish dismounted the train and deployed to protect the route, with three of the platoons on the right side of the line, positioned in the Dunswart Station's garden. The remainder of the battalion now also dismounted the train, and in the battle which ensued, three officers and nine other ranks of the Transvaal Scottish were killed, and two officers and twenty four other ranks were wounded. After accurate counter fire from the Transvaal Scottish, the rebels positioned on the right began a retreat through the orchards and cottage gardens, and the rebels on the left and front soon retreated as well.

McLeod planned to get his men off of the train, where they would then march to Benoni with their reserve ammunition. McLeod was then informed of the rebel's apparent general retreat on the right flank, which made McLeod skeptical of his plan. Believing the "general retreat" to actually be an attempt by the rebels to attack the Transvaal Scottish from behind, McLeod quickly planned for his men back onto the train so that they could continue with the original plan and prevent further enemy attacks. This second plan was also abandoned, as not only would it have been easy for rebel snipers to kill the wounded men being put back onto the train, but McLeod was informed that a rebel commando force was waiting to ambush the Transvaal Scottish at Avenue Road. Colonel Taylor would suggest to McLeod that they dig-in and hold on, but this plan was rejected by McLeod, who thought it wouldn't be worth it once the rebels completely surrounded them. Eventually, McLeod decided to get his men back onto the train and make a withdrawal to the town of Dunswart, where they would then set up defensive positions. While they collected their dead and wounded, Captain Harry Halse with a force of 100 mounted policemen and a 13 pounder field gun from the Transvaal Horse Artillery arrived from Boksburg. Captain Halse was looking for reinforcements to relieve the defenders of Benoni, and the Transvaal Scottish were required to assist. Putting the dead and seriously wounded on the train with a small escort, the rest of the Transvaal Scottish (both the fit and the wounded) began their march to Benoni. Captain Halse offered to guide the Transvaal Scottish through a lesser known route, and put a troop of mounted policemen ahead of the relief force as scouts and a troop of mounted policemen behind the relief force as a rearguard, while the rest of the mounted police maneuvered alongside the Transvaal Scottish.

As they marched through a "native" settlement and the Kleinfontein Mine, only two shots were fired at the relief force before they reached Benoni town. Because of Halse's new route which entered Benoni from the south, the rebels were unprepared to fight the relief force from that direction, and had set up defenses entirely on the other side of the town. Arriving at the Benoni police barracks at 6 PM, the Transvaal Scottish were permitted to get some rest.

The next day, posts were established at the Power Station, the Post Office, and the Banks, as the defenders of Benoni were unable to clear the town entirely. Revolutionary snipers were gradually silenced throughout Saturday and Sunday by counter-sniping, machine gun fire, and the arrest of suspects. The government defenders of Benoni often set out patrols to clear buildings of snipers and neutralize rebels. On one occasion a Transvaal Scottish patrol moving along in file up against each building had to pass a gap where a house was set back with a garden in front. An old man who acted friendly with the patrol was working in the garden. As an officer made a dash across the gap, however, the old man whipped out a revolver and fired, missing the officer before the old man was then captured by the patrol. Furthermore, many of the rebel snipers are reported to have fought in women's clothes to prevent detection, or sniped at government forces from beneath the skirts of women.

On 12 March (Sunday), Lieutenant Colonel Burne entered Benoni with a small force of South African Mounted Riflemen from Robert Heights (18 officers and 333 other ranks), with orders to relieve the government defenders of Benoni and clear the rebel positions section-by-section. At 6:30 AM, the relief force entered the Asian and Bantu sections of Benoni and came into contact with the 1st Permanent Battery under Major Wolmarans. A small detachment of Transvaal Scottish who accompanied the relief force were sent to join Colonel McLeod at Benoni. Burne then planned to assault a strong rebel position at Dunswart, deploying two 13-pounder guns to assist in the assault (although the gunners were ordered not to shoot at houses). After an hour of fighting, the government assault force took the Dunswart Steel Works and the brass foundry although this attack resulted in high police casualties, including the death of Captain Halse. The strikers then repositioned to the western outskirts of Benoni, firing at the government forces from captured houses and the orchards. Colonel Burne moved his headquarters to the steelworks, and then ordered the attack to move along the Main Reef Road through Benoni. Burne's force advanced in a circular motion, clearing the south-east, south-west, and north-west suburban areas held by strikers. The government forces already in Benoni picked off strikers who attempted to attack Burne's force by maneuvering past the defenders' positions. By the afternoon, Burne's force had captured a third of Benoni. With reports coming in of a revolutionary attack on Benoni the next day, the Transvaal Scottish spent that Sunday night by entrenching themselves and preparing defensive positions at the Benoni police barracks. The scattered posts were abandoned as it was believed that they could no longer be reliably held. That night, revolutionaries reportedly looted and burned buildings in Benoni, taking advantage of the besieged government positions.

That afternoon, government burghers from Standerton arrived and set up camp at East Rand station under the command of Commandant G.J Engelbrecht and Lieutenant Colonel P.Botha, where they waited for rifles and ammunition to arrive from Pretoria. Later that day, General Johannes Van Deventer met with the two burgher leaders and Burne, where they planned a full-scale operation on the next day, 13 March. The government officers were confident of victory, as their forces were strengthened by unarmed volunteers from Platteland. Just before midnight, a munitions train (which had been held up 3 times by sabotaged railway lines) carrying rifles and ammunition arrived at East Rand Station, and the burghers and volunteers spent most of early Monday morning being equipped. At 6:30 AM, Burne sent reconnaissance patrols and prepared to attack, and by 7:30 AM, more than a thousand government soldiers were advancing into Benoni.

The assault force's left flank was reinforced by burgher commandos from the Heidelberg Highveld and Standerton West (under the command of Commandants Trichardt and W.J Van Rensburg respectively). On the right flank, burgher commandos from Standerton and Blesbokspruit (under the command of Commandant Greyling) launched an enveloping movement, while the Heidelberg Town commando (under the command of Commandant Mangold) was held in reserve. Many strikers reportedly either surrendered immediately on sight of government forces or gave an overall lackluster defense, with government forces breaking past the heavy barricades (which had been set up around the Benoni Trade Hall) by 10 AM with light casualties.

Many revolutionaries attempted to escape capture by abandoning their firearms in gutters or other such hiding spots and then pretending to be uninvolved civilians. This issue was solved by Burne who had every man in the town rounded up and then allowed those men who could prove their lack of involvement to leave. The rest of the men who could not prove their innocence were placed in a temporary internment camp under the guard of a Transvaal Scottish detachment. Many civilians in Benoni were reportedly angry at the strikers, and while the Benoni Fire Brigade was being sent to extinguish a fictional fire, a group of civilians burnt down the Benoni Trades Hall.

=== Ellis Park ===
On March 10, mobilized men of the Imperial Light Horse regiment were sent to their regimental headquarters, which was set up on an unused football pitch at Ellis Park in the Eastern Suburbs. From there, the mobilized men were hastily equipped and formed into dismounted squadrons before being given orders. The regimental headquarters was sited in a basin surrounded by high ground and encircled with houses and sheds, which made it a poorly chosen area to set up headquarters. During the afternoon of March 10, a police camp at Milner Park was attacked by rebels, and "B" Squadron of the I.L.H, under the command of Captain F.G Slade, was deployed from Ellis Park to reinforce the police defenders there. Meanwhile "A" Squadron of the I.L.H, under the command of Captain Bodley, was dispatched to the southern suburbs to counter a threatened attack on the Robinson Deep Mine.

On March 11 at around 13:30 PM, about 150 unarmed men of the I.L.H's "C" and "D" Squadrons stationed at Ellis Park were attacked by rebels from the Jeppe and Denver commandos, who had successfully maneuvered onto the high ground surrounding the football field. The rebels' right flank opened fire on the I.L.H men before the center and left rebel flanks were in position, which allowed the unarmed I.L.H men, rallied and led by Major George Rennie, to gather their firearms and respond to the attack. After gathering their weapons and affixing bayonets, the I.L.H men cleared the south-east corner of the football grounds after charging at the rebel positions. The I.L.H men then maneuvered to the Southern side of the football grounds, driving the rebels from a hedge and a ditch. Major Rennie ordered Lieutenant M.J du Plessis and a troop of I.L.H men to follow and attack the retreating rebel right flank, resulting in high rebel casualties. Further East, a number of retreating rebels (which included Military Cross recipient Captain Hall) were singlehandedly captured by the I.L.H's regimental bugler, who was only armed with a pistol. Finding the rebels of the center and left flanks coming from southerly and westerly directions (who were still advancing in columns of 4 in an attempt to reach their pre-planned positions for the already-commenced assault), Major Rennie and his remaining men opened fire, halting the rebel assault and forcing the rebels to retreat. Withdrawing the advanced parties of I.L.H who were tasked with harassing the retreating rebels, Major Rennie and his men then searched the houses surrounding the football grounds, clearing out any remaining rebels. By the end of the battle, 6 to 8 men of the I.L.H were killed and 14 to 15 men were wounded, while reportedly more than 50 rebels were killed and an even larger number were wounded.

=== Fordsburg and Marshall Square ===
Fordsburg had been one of the main sources of revolutionary activity, and as such, it was where Percy Fisher and Harry Spendiff commanded their forces from. Meanwhile, the nearby Marshall Square was the main police headquarters in Johannesburg, meaning it was imperative to the rebels that they captured it as soon as possible. On Friday 10 and Saturday 11, the Marshall Square Police Station and the Special Police camp came under sniper fire from the direction of Brixton Ridge. As a result of the rebel actions in the area, most food-stores were closed, causing starvation amongst the general population of the Witwatersrand.

The Charge Office at Fordsburg and the nearby Fordsburg police barracks were attacked early in the morning of March 10, the former building only being defended by Lieutenant McDonnel and nine other policemen. The defenders of the Charge Office defended the building until they ran out of ammunition at around 6 PM, at which point they were ordered by Godley to evacuate the Charge Office and if possible link up with the defenders of the barracks (which was around 600 yards away). The defenders of the Charge Office successfully maneuvered to the barracks, although one policeman only made it with assistance from a grocer known as Marais. The next day, Marais was seized by the rebels and falsely accused and found guilty of being a police informant before being executed by firing squad. Also on March 10, The District Commandant of Johannesburg, Captain Lloyd, and a young boy named Simmons voluntarily and successfully drove a motor car through rebel positions in order to deliver 3000 rounds of ammunition to the police defenders at the Fordsburg barracks. As a result of this success, the defenders of Fordsburg barracks were able to hold out against rebel attacks until Fordsburg was finally recaptured by Government forces on March 14.

At 10:20 AM on March 10, "G" Squadron of the South African Police (104 men and officers strong) under the command of Captain Whelehan was ordered by Lieutenant-Colonel Godley to send Lieutenant Sawle with two troops of "G" Squadron to a point on the Main Reef road near Robinson Mine, where a vehicle transporting food to the Special Police had been held up by the strikers. At 11:00 AM, Constables G.N Fletcher and E.W Boucher were sent to Marshall Square (facing heavy rebel fire on the way) to report that Sawle and his men faced difficulties and needed reinforcements. At around 11:15 AM, Lieutenant Sawle and his men had dismounted their horses and took cover in a footpath after coming under fire from rebel snipers, although they were still exposed to fire from the South, West, and East. Godley then ordered Whelehan to take the remaining two troops of "G" Squadron and go assist Sawle's troops. Taking Fletcher as a guide (while Boucher stayed behind to replace his exhausted horse before rejoining Whelehan's Squadron), Whelehan and his two troops began their journey to Sawle's position, taking heavy fire from the revolutionaries after the relief force passed the Fordsburg dip. Making it to Sawle's position at the North Western corner of Pioneer and Mint Roads, Whelehan ordered his two troops to dismount at the North Eastern corner of Pioneer and Mint Roads. Lieutenant Sawle informed Whelehan that his troops already had 3 men wounded and 1 man killed, with 4 horses killed and 2 wounded. One of Whelehan's troops' horses was also killed soon after this exchange.

Realizing that his men were surrounded and were being shot at from houses on all sides, Whelehan ordered his men that still had horses to mount and move towards a stone dump on higher ground to the South. Those men without healthy horses were ordered to stay behind, treat the wounded, and (as Whelehan would say in a later report): "Do the best they could for themselves". Before leaving for the stone dump, 3 more men were wounded and another horse was killed, resulting in 20 policemen being left behind.

While galloping to the stone dump (which turned out to be the dump North of Main Reef road and Bonanza Compound on the Crown Mines) the police came under heavy fire, although only four men were wounded (one from a gunshot wound and the other three from their horses falling from beneath them). Reaching the dump, Whelehan decided to advance back to Pioneer Road with his men on foot, in an attempt to clear the houses in front of them and to relieve the policemen who had stayed behind with the wounded. Advancing through the houses, a constable's helmet got shot off of his head, and Whelehan ordered a volley to be fired at the door and windows of the house believed to be where the gunshot originated from. The policemen then rushed the building, only to find a wounded housewife and a Union Defence Force reservist who was forced by the rebels to remain inside his home and not mobilize to enforce martial law. The rifle found on the reservist did not appear to have been recently fired, and the police then left the house and continued their relief effort.

Upon leaving the house, the policemen came across a group of Red Cross medical staff (some of whom were revolutionaries), who asked if the policemen had any wounded. Whelehan directed the Red Cross staff to the house of the wounded housewife, and was informed in turn by a Doctor Benusan that the men on Pioneer Road were attended to and then taken prisoner by the rebels. Whelehan ordered a withdrawal back to the stone dump, but one policeman was killed and nine others were cut off and captured. Taking up positions at the stone dump, the policemen set up makeshift schanzes before coming under heavy fire again. One constable later died of wounds gained in this engagement.

Realizing that his men didn't have access to water, Whelehan withdrew his men and fell back without further casualties to a position East of the Mine's compound, while the horses were kept inside the compound itself. At 13:40 PM, Whelehan managed to access the Crown Mines compound telephone and get into contact with Godley. Whelehan asked Godley for orders, and received from Godley orders to hold as strong of a position that he could find and keep the revolutionaries busy with attempting to deal with Whelehan's force. As the gunfire died down soon after the telephone conversation with Godley, Whelehan then sent out scouts to observe their right flank. At around 16:30 PM, one of these scouts returned with a message from Captain Taylor of "L" Squadron, who had been sent out to relieve Whelehan's force, but was held up by rebel forces at the stone dump of Robinson Mine (which was to the east of No.1 Shaft). Taylor's message read the following:

"The position is this. Colonel Godley wants us to take up a defensive position between Fordsburg and Johannesburg. I have a line about four hundred yards along Commissioner Street. My men are on mine dumps. The country between my position and town should be guarded. I am taking up a position there. If you could come through the mine property to where i am now we could join hands. I am shifting my lines to the new position."

Despite Taylor's request conflicting with Godley's telephoned orders to Whelehan, Whelehan and his men arrived at Captain Taylor's position at around 18:00 PM. While it was initially planned for Whelehan's force to take Taylor's position while Taylor moved his force closer to Johannesburg, the two Captains decided to stay in the same position (which ran along the south side of Main Reef road from No.1 Shaft of the Robinson Mine to the old dump overlooking the Fordsburg Dip), with Whelehan's men occupying the left flank and Taylor's men occupying the right flank. At 21:30 PM, Whelehan sent a dispatch via a Black South African civilian to Colonel Godley, explaining the current situation and the link-up with Taylor's force. At around midnight, Whelehan received a response from Marshall Square, ordering him to dig his forces in and establish communication with Captain Bodley (who had a force at the Robinson Compressor), who in turn was in communication with another force on the Robinson Deep. These orders were carried out, and a line of communication was established with Marshall Square via the Robinson Compressor and Robinson Deep Mine, through which food, equipment, and ammunition were obtained.

At 10:00 AM on 11 March (Saturday), Whelehan received a message from Godley, which stated that General Beves was making every endeavor to relieve the police force. Whelehan, believing that the situation did not need immediate saving, sent a reply to Godley explaining that unless his positions were overwhelmed by superior numbers, his forces could hold out for a reasonably long time. Throughout the day, the police's positions (which now included a series of trenches of redoubts) were continuously sniped at, although there was no major attempt by the revolutionaries to capture the police's positions. Only one man of "L" Squadron was killed during the period of 11 March to 14 March, who on 12 March was shot in the head and killed while on sentry duty. At midnight on 13 March, Captain Donald of Godley's staff personally brought Whelehan a copy of his secret orders in connection to operations planned to take place on 14 March.

== Government counterattack ==
=== Brakpan and the East Rand outskirts ===
Wanting to press the advantage and build on the success they had achieved in Benoni, General Van Deventer ordered the government forces under his command to immediately maneuver to Brakpan and relieve the defenders of Brakpan town. The defenders of Brakpan were primarily located at the power station and the police station (these positions sharing a machine gun crew and a lewis gun crew from the Permanent Force), although there were isolated units as well.

Deventer's relief force left Benoni at 12:30 PM, and by 13:30 PM the Brakpan Mine was captured without opposition. Shortly after the capture of the mine, the defenders of the power station were relieved by Deventer's relief force. A squadron of S.A.M.R alongside a police escort advanced through Brakpan without opposition, although they then faced heavy rebel gunfire once they emerged at the South-East end of the town.

The government units on the S.A.M.R's left and right flanks faced brief skirmishes with rebels, primarily at Brakpan Railway station and a timber yard on the right, and at the plantations on the left. The plantations on the left also faced shelling from a field gun. The field gun in question was a World War One memorial which had been standing at the Brakpan Mine golf club. The surviving Brakpan Mine officials, wanting to avenge the victims of the Brakpan Mine massacre, loaded the field gun with a borrowed shell and aimed it at the rebel positions at the plantations. While there is no evidence to suggest that the field gun hit anything, all of the windows within the vicinity of the plantations were reportedly shattered.

The rebels at Brakpan did not expect Deventer's relief force, and by 14:30 PM the entire town was captured by government forces. A similar process to what took place at Benoni then commenced, with all male inhabitants of Brakpan being rounded up and placed in the town's market square, where they were then searched and classified by a magistrate, detectives, and uniformed police officers. Those residents deemed loyal to the government were issued passes, while those who could not prove their innocence were sent to Boksburg Jail. On the Tuesday morning, the police made a house-to-house search, which resulted in the capture of 800 rebels, 100 rifles, 70 revolvers, and 3000 rounds of ammunition. Among the captured rebels was John Garnsworthy.

Deventer maintained communication with Brakpan town via telephone lines (which the East Rand rebels had failed to sabotage), and was therefore easily able to respond to sightings of rebel movement. The use of Burghers played a large role in lowering the morale of rebels, as many rebels believed that the burghers would either join them in their revolt against the pro-British Jan Smuts government, or would remain neutral. In one instance, a pro-government mounted burgher patrol was approached by a group of 30 armed strikers, who believed the burghers to be fellow revolutionaries. After warmly greeting the burghers, the officer commanding the strikers said to his burgher equivalent: "Shall we go along with you?" To which the burgher officer responded with "Yes, by all means. In the center." The strikers did as they were told, and were then immediately surrounded and captured by the burgher patrol.

=== West Rand ===
Having captured Brixton Ridge, Colonel Thackeray set up his headquarters at Auckland Park in preparation for the government assault on Fordsburg. Braamfontein was now occupied by military units while other troops were entrenched in the railway grounds at Kazerne. Furthermore, Godley's police held a line from Marshall Square down to the mine dumps in the South West. The strikers in the southern suburbs were being contained by small detachments of military and police units while burghers loyal to the government (under the command of Colonel Albert Nussey) were being deployed upon the western perimeter of the Witwatersrand.

Nussey's push into the Western suburbs was well-planned and well-timed. The government advance guard under the command of Commandant Piet De La Rey reached Krugersdorp on Saturday afternoon and the main body of loyal burghers arrived the following day. The government burghers then occupied Roodepoort on the Sunday night with little to no opposition. The rebel forces on the West Rand were considered to be poorly equipped, poorly trained, and poorly motivated, and Nussey was able to complete his movements easily as a result.

On 13 March (Monday), Nussey's burghers advanced in four columns. The mounted details advanced North and South of the Railway track, a column of burgher infantry proceeded to Johannesburg via Main Reef Road, while a force of 600 burghers travelled by an armoured-train escorted train. A dawn advance was made by the burghers onto the settlement of Florida, which happened with little trouble. Nussey would leave a small force in Florida under the command of Commandant Bothma before splitting the rest of his burgher force into two columns, one which marched along Main Reef Road, and the other which marched parallel to the railway line. Detachments of Nussey's burghers liberated Hamberg and Maraisberg while facing little to no resistance, successfully recapturing the police stations in those towns. The pro-government Luipaardsvlei Commando under the command of Commandant Muller advanced into Fairlands and released a sub-inspector and other policemen who had been captured at Newlands.

By the evening, Nussey had burghers positioned within striking distance of rebel-controlled Fordsburg, where he then ordered a halt. That night, his extended force linked up with other government detachments. His right flank made contact with a squadron of South African Mounted Rifles under the command of Captain Van Der Merwe, while a portion of Nussey's burghers under the command of Commandant Meyer joined up with elements of the Durban Light Infantry in the vicinity of New Clare Station. That Tuesday (14 March), Nussey moved his headquarters to the Langlaagte railway station, and then waited for orders to proceed onto Fordsburg.

=== Fordsburg ===
Percy Fisher became noticeably mentally strained as a result of managing much of the Fordsburg rebel operations directly. A rebel named Daniel Colraine would later testify that he urged Fisher and Spendiff to surrender (or at the very least bring the concept forward as a vote to the rest of the rebels) in the face of the overwhelming government forces. Colraine would state that Fisher and Spendiff, while appreciating the proposition, ended up refusing to entertain such an idea as they feared it would make the communist movement seem cowardly.

That Sunday on 12 March, local newspapers would report that a "sullen fatalism" had taken over many of the Fordsburg rebels, with many rebels turning to drinking and gambling. One unfounded and unrealistic rumor which spread through the rebel ranks was about how a young girl doing some errands was shoved to the ground by policemen and then killed with a bayonet stab. The rank-and-file policemen, for their part, were by at this point enraged at the revolutionaries, and the policemen oftentimes discussed the possibility of shooting suspects on sight, although such calls to action were seemingly never followed through with.

Fisher's mental state was reportedly deteriorating as government forces drew nearer. It would be testified that Fisher would actively seek out noncombatants and order them (oftentimes at gunpoint) to help in preparing Fordsburg's defenses. Captured policemen held in Fordsburg would later testify that Fisher repeatedly attempted to gain an oath of neutrality from the police prisoners, and when this failed, he would sjambok the policemen and threaten them at gunpoint in an attempt to break their morale, although this failed too. Lawrence Saunders, a rebel officer at Fordsburg, would testify at the later court of inquiry that on the Monday he overheard Fisher stating that he would shoot the police prisoners. Saunders took this information to Allen Davies (another rebel officer), and the two men, who had guaranteed the safety of some of the police prisoners, then confronted Fisher and Spendiff. Saunders asked Fisher if he was genuine in his threat, and Fisher responded with a yes, saying that the police prisoners were a "damned nuisance". Saunders and Davies then pulled revolvers on Fisher and Spendiff, and forced the two men to put their hands up. After a brief argument, Fisher said that he would leave the policemen alone, but if the rebels successfully held out against the government counterattack, Fisher explained that he would kill Saunders instead, telling Saunders that "It's all right, old boy; if we win this outfit i will do for you the first chance i get."

On 14 March, Tuesday morning, an SAAF aeroplane was spotted circling over Fordsburg, the aircraft dropping thousands of leaflets ordering civilians (both black and White) to move out of Fordsburg by 11 AM. These leaflets were printed in English, Afrikaans, Zulu, and Sotho, and read the following message:

Women and children and persons well disposed towards the government are advised to leave between 6 am and 11 am. Today that part of Fordsburg and vicinity is where the authority of the government is defied and military operations may take place. They will proceed to Show Ground with such blankets, food, and personal belongings as they can carry with them. They will take the following route: Through Vrededorp Subway along Kaffir Street and 17th Street, then via Toll Street to tramline, following tramline to main entrance of Show Ground. No immunity from arrest and punishment is guaranteed to any person coming out under this notice who has broken the law.

Against the wishes of the government, a second refugee camp was established at Mayfair School inside of the school's auditorium. Taffy Long, a rebel officer who was wearing his makeshift uniform, stood on the auditorium's platform and called on every male older than 15 years old to move to the revolutionary's Fordsburg headquarters and partake in the defence. Several men, with the help of their wives, attempted to evade the call-up, but most of the refugees there were in support of this call-up and therefore every man was forced to go. Taffy would exclaim to them that every man should join the defence, and those men who didn't have guns would pick guns up off of the dead. One of these men pressed into service was an unarmed teenager named Rautenbach, who was shot in the head and killed soon after arriving at the defensive line.

30 minutes before the government attack was meant to commence, a representative from the Fordsburg rebels arrived and asked for terms of surrender. General Beves, who was confident in victory, told the representative that he would only accept unconditional surrender by 11 AM, otherwise the attack would begin as scheduled. At 11 AM, two Transvaal Horse Artillery 13 pounder guns, positioned on Brixton Ridge, opened fire. A third T.H.A 13 pounder gun on Sauer Street (which was South of Marshall Square) soon opened fire as well. As there was a fear that the guns may kill the police prisoners, it was decided that only Shrapnel shells would be used in the government barrage. The gun on Sauer Street, after heavily damaging the rebel headquarters, stopped firing after an officer realized that it might kill police prisoners by accident.

Behind the barrage, government forces commenced their assault. Mounted Burghers from Gatsrand, Vaal River, Losberg and Klerksdorp commandos under the command of Commandant Meyer began a wide encircling movement to the South of the railway line with their objective being to link with police squadrons. This movement was successfully completed by noon. At 11:30 AM on 14 March, Captain Donald informed Whelehan that Colonel Nussey's force of burghers was advancing on Mayfair, and by Noon, the right flank of Colonel Nussey's force (under the command of officers Colonel Hall, Colonel Meyer, and Lieutenant Blignaut) joined up with Whelehan's left flank. At 13:00 PM, Whelehan received orders to advance the majority of his policemen to positions in Fordsburg, but after discussions with Captain Donald who in turn communicated with Colonel Godley, it was decided that Whelehan's advance would be delayed until government artillery could shell the rebel positions. Returning to his line, Whelehan was informed that a portion of "L" Squadron's right flank under the command of Lieutenant Thomas had already advanced, but was now taking cover in a ditch from enemy fire just ahead of his original position.

The appearance of Nussey's forces on the outskirts of Fordsburg ended many of the strikers' hopes of salvaging a victory. A mentally unwell Fisher, still in command of the rebels, ordered that there would be no surrender. 5 strikers who were found attempting to desert were brought to Fisher, where he reportedly sjambokked (flogged with a sjambok) them mercilessly. At this stage however, Fisher was showing surprising gentleness towards the police prisoners, telling them that they should find whatever cover they could. The captured policemen however decided that they would wait on the first floor of the main hall, believing that their liberation would arrive soon. The police prisoners casually chatted to one another and quietly listened to the repetitive singing by the strikers of the chorus verses of the song "Red Flag".

At around 11:50 AM, a composite assault force mostly made up of men from the Durban Light Infantry and Transvaal Scottish left Brixton Ridge and moved south, with their first objective being to take the railway line between Fordsburg and Braamfontein stations. After successfully taking the railway line, the force halted and waited for the signal from their artillery to continue the advance. Prime Minister and General Jan Smuts and his staff had meanwhile posted themselves at a vantage point where they could observe the entire operation. Civilian motorists were transporting soldiers through the zones of battle, while military headquarters in Pretoria had sent a whippet tank (H.M.L.S Union) to assist the assault force. Despite breaking down in the Fordsburg zone of battle and losing one of its crew, the whippet tank reportedly had a great effect on the morale of both government and rebel forces. An armoured car under the command of Rand Light Infantry sergeant-major H. Hall also contributed to the battle.

Nussey's dismounted burghers were now in Fordsburg and were making their way towards Fordsburg Square, clearing cottages and rooming-houses which the rebels had converted into sniper nests. Nussey's mounted burghers meanwhile had moved across to the right and linked up with police in the mining terrain. For a time there was a sizable gap between this mounted column and the infantry working through from the west, although this gap was soon closed by the Ventersdorp Commando under the command of Commandant Yssel (who's commando had been held in reserve up to this point). The encircling movement from the west was now complete.

When it was clear to Fisher and Spendiff that victory was impossible, the two men quietly bid farewell to their close comrades and then went to their office. An elderly police sergeant (whom Percy Fisher had reportedly targeted in particular with abuse and torture in a failed attempt to break the sergeant's spirits) turned to his fellow policemen and stated that "They are going to put themselves out." Before killing themselves with a gunshot to the head, the two leaders of the strike, Percy Fisher and Harry Spendiff, left a note signed by both of the two of them which said: "We died for what we believed in - the Cause."

From 15 to 19 March 1922, South African troops cleared the areas of snipers and did house-to-house searches of premises belonging to the rebels. The rebellion was officially declared over on 18 March 1922.

== Aftermath ==
Smuts' actions caused a political backlash, and in the 1924 elections his South African Party lost to a coalition of the National Party and Labour Party. They introduced the Industrial Conciliation Act 1924, Wage Act 1925 and Mines and Works Amendment Act 1926, which recognised White trade unions and reinforced the colour bar. Under instruction from the Comintern, the CPSA reversed its attitude toward the White working class and adopted a new 'Native Republic' policy.

Lieutenant Colonel Llewellyn Andersson's role in creating the Union Defence Force was instrumental in crushing the rebellion using "considerable military firepower and at the cost of over 200 lives.

The 4th Congress of the Communist International denounced the crushing of the revolt, and gave their full support to the CPSA and Labour Party revolutionaries, while also expressing that they should in future attempt to work with Black South Africans.

After the strike, 18 strikers were sentenced to death for murder, of which 14 were reprieved. The four men to not be reprieved, were Carel Christian Stassen, Taffy Long, Herbert Hull, and David Lewis, were all executed by hanging at Pretoria Central Prison. Stassen was hanged on 5 October 1922, while the other three men were hanged together on 17 November 1922. He was convicted of killing two men, John Setsuta and John McKenzie, in what witnesses said were racially motivated killings. Long was convicted of executing the grocer Marais, while Hull and Lewis were convicted of killing a soldier. As they marched to the gallows, Long began singing the "Red Flag", the anthem of early socialists and communists in South Africa. He was joined in the song by the other two men. As they walked, all the prisoners sang with them.

== In popular culture ==
A TV series in 8 episodes produced by the SABC in 1984 and entitled 1922, tells this part of South African history.

In Agatha Christie's The Man in the Brown Suit, published in 1924, the Rand Rebellion is mentioned both by name and as a backdrop for the mystery. Christie washes over the specifics and uses the Rebellion as nothing more than a minor inconvenience for her characters.

In Wilbur Smith's A Sparrow Falls one of the principal characters becomes embroiled with some of the organizers of the Rand Rebellion in Fordsburg and fictionalized descriptions of some of the first skirmishes with the authorities are described.

== Bibliography ==
- Jeremy Krikler, Rand Revolt: The 1922 Insurrection and Racial Killings in South Africa, Jonathan Ball Publishers SA, 2006, ISBN 978-186842-189-3
- Wessel Pretorius Visser, A History of the South African Mine Workers' Union, 1902-2014, Edwin Mellen Press, 2016, ISBN 978-1-4955-0460-0

== See also ==
- Maritz rebellion
- Benjamin Jennings Caddy
- Jacob van Deventer
- Ernest Glanville
- Cape Mounted Riflemen
- Light Horse Regiment
