= Zimbabwe Congress of Trade Unions =

Zimbabwe Congress of Trade Unions (ZCTU)
- Zimbabwe Congress of Trade Unions
- Founded: February 28, 1981
- Headquarters: Harare, Zimbabwe
- Location: Zimbabwe
- Members: 400,000
- Key people: Morgan Tsvangirai, Former Secretary General; Lovemore Matombo, president Isaac Matongo, former Vice-President, Gibson Sibanda, Former President
- Affiliations: ITUC, CTUC, OATUU
- Website: www.zctu.co.zw

The Zimbabwe Congress of Trade Unions is the primary trade union federation in Zimbabwe. The Secretary General of ZCTU is Japhet Moyo and the president is Peter Mutasa. The former General Secretary was Morgan Tsvangirai. Jeffrey Mutandare is a former president of the ZCTU.

== History ==
The ZCTU was formed on February 28, 1981 through the merger of six trade union centres: African Trade Union Congress (ATUC), the National African Trade Union Congress (NATUC), the Trade Union Congress of Zimbabwe (TUCZ), the United Trade Unions of Zimbabwe (UTUZ), the Zimbabwe Federation of Labour (ZFL) and the Zimbabwe Trade Union Congress (ZTUC). The ZCTU was established by the ruling party, ZANU-PF, with the aim of reducing industrial disputation, and improving the influence of the government over the union movement.

Prior to the creation of the state of Zimbabwe official trade unions in Rhodesia were largely controlled by the white minority and worked to preserve the economic privilege of white workers over the black majority. While trade unions representing the black majority workforce did exist, their activities were hampered by the racially discriminatory Rhodesian government, and their close association with the black nationalist movement meant they were relatively inactive during the Rhodesian Bush War. Trade union membership increased rapidly following the establishment of majority-rule government in 1980, and reached approximately 200,000 in 1985. The number of strikes and industrial disputes also increased dramatically, against the wishes of the new government. It was to combat this trend that the government established the ZCTU, as well as promising the introduction of a minimum wage and limited industrial democracy.

The initial leadership of the ZCTU was politically closely associated with the government, and was dismissed in 1984 for corruption. Their replacements (following a period of caretaker administration) were also found to be corrupt, with the General Secretary removed for missappropriating funds in November 1986. The direction of the ZCTU changed dramatically after the appointment of Jeffrey Mutandare, of the Associated Mineworkers' Union. Mutandare was much more willing than previous leaders to criticise government policy, including the new Labour Relations Act of 1985, which he claimed centralised control over the trade union movement in the Ministry of Labour.

In the 1990s the ZCTU grew increasingly opposed to the government of Robert Mugabe due to the government's pursuit of neoliberal economic policies, as well as perceived government corruption and authoritarianism. At its 1995 Congress the ZCTU launched a major economic policy statement, 'Beyond ESAP', criticising the Mugabe government's adoption of the Economic Structural Adjustment Programme (ESAP). The ESAP involved the introduction of neoliberal macroeconomic policies, at the encouragement of the World Bank. The ZCTU was the main force behind the formation of the opposition party, the Movement for Democratic Change, established in 1999. The Secretary-General of the ZCTU, Morgan Tsvangirai, later became the President of the MDC.

== Affiliates ==
As of January 2014 the following unions were affiliated to the ZCTU.

- Zimbabwe Pulp & Paper Workers' Union
- Zimbabwe Domestic & Allied Workers Union (ZDAWU)
- Zimbabwe Chemicals & Plastics Allied Workers' Union
- Zimbabwe Textile Workers Union (ZTWU)
- Zimbabwe Tobacco Industrial Workers’ Union (ZTIWU)
- Zimbabwe Metal, Energy & Allied Workers’ Union (ZMEAWU)
- Zimbabwe Security Guards Union (ZISEGU)
- Zimbabwe Banks & Allied Workers’ Union (ZIBAWU)
- Zimbabwe Furniture, Timber & Allied Trades Union (ZFTATU)
- Zimbabwe Educational Scientific, Social & Cultural Workers’ Union (ZESSCWU)
- Zimbabwe Catering & Hotel Workers’ Union (ZCHWU)
- Zimbabwe Construction and Allied Trades Workers’ Union
- Zimbabwe Urban Councils Workers’ Union (ZUCWU)
- Zimbabwe Union of Journalists
- Zimbabwe Amalgamated Railway Workers’ Union (ZARWU)
- Railway Association of Yard Operating Staff (RAYOS)
- Zimbabwe Railways Artisans Union (RAU)
- Railway Association of Enginemen (RAE)
- National Union of the Clothing Industry (NUCI)
- National Engineering Workers’ Union (NEWU)
- Motor Vehicle Manufacturers Workers’ Union of Zimbabwe (MVMWUZ)
- General Agriculture & Plantation Workers’ Union of Zimbabwe (GAPWUZ)
- Federation of Food & Allied Workers’ Union of Zimbabwe (FFAWUZ)
- Commercial Workers’ Union of Zimbabwe
- Cement, Lime & Allied Workers’ Union of Zimbabwe (CLAWUZ)
