= Railway African Workers' Union =

Trade union in Rhodesia from 1949 to 1967

R.A.W.U.
- Railway African Workers' Union
- Founded: 1949
- Dissolved: 1967
- Location: Rhodesia
- Key people: Joshua Nkomo, General Secretary; Dixon Konkola, President

The Railway African Workers' Union (R.A.W.U.) was a trade union in Rhodesia which represented black African railway workers employed by the Rhodesian Railways.

== History ==
The RAWU was formed through the merger of the Northern Rhodesian African Railway Workers Trade Union (ARTWU) and the Southern Rhodesian Rhodesia Railways African Employees' Union (RRAEU) at a meeting in Broken Hill in July 1955. Dixon Konkola, the president of the ARTWU, was elected president of the new unified body, but was prevented by the government from visiting Southern Rhodesia, despite the union being based in Bulawayo. The combined union had a membership of 22,000. Several key leaders in the movement for majority rule in Rhodesia were active in the RAWU, including Joshua Nkomo (General Secretary), Aaron Ndabambi Dlomo (President) and Knight Maripe (Secretary-General). Following majority rule in 1980, the RAWU became the Zimbabwe Amalgamated Railwaymen's Union (ZARU).
