= Industrial Workers of the World (South Africa) =

South African trade union

- Industrial Workers of the World (South Africa)
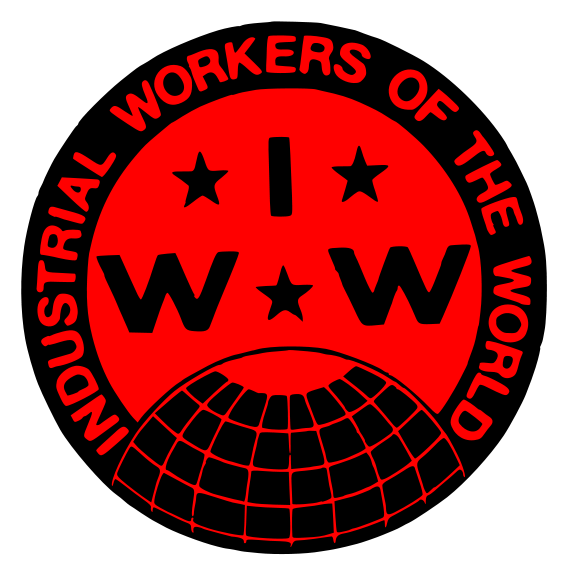
- Abbreviation: IWW (SA)
- Successor: ICU
- Formation: June 1910; 116 years ago
- Dissolved: 1922; 104 years ago
- Purpose: Syndicalism; Industrial unionism
- Headquarters: Johannesburg
- General Secretary: Andrew Dunbar
- Main organ: Voice of Labour
- Parent organization: Industrial Workers of the World

The Industrial Workers of the World (South Africa) or IWW (SA) had a brief but notable history in the 1910s-20s, and is particularly noted for its influence on the syndicalist movement in southern Africa through its promotion of the IWW's principles of industrial unionism, solidarity, and direct action, as well as its role in the creation of organizations such as the Industrial Workers of Africa and the Industrial and Commercial Workers' Union.

== History ==
=== Background ===
Founded in 1905, the IWW attempted to gather together some of the most radical currents in the American labour movement, ranging from the militant Western Federation of Miners under the leadership of "Big Bill" Haywood, to anarchists such as Lucy Parsons, to Eugene V. Debs and his Socialist Party of America. While this political eclecticism would cause a number of splits in the union, by the 1910s it would begin to develop into a distinct "global and transnational current" of its own within the American and international left, most closely aligned to the syndicalist movement, especially the anarcho-syndicalists who would later form the International Workers' Association (IWA). This would influence the IWW's position in South Africa significantly.

In particular, the question of race in worker organizing in South Africa under apartheid would heavily influence the direction of different organizations, with some organizations being explicitly white-only, others predominantly black, and others making attempts at truly multiracial organizing. The IWW had significant experience in multiracial organizing in the United States through its support for the multiracial Brotherhood of Timber Workers, as well as IWW Local 8 in Philadelphia, which organized longshoremen. The celebrated multiracial local, in turn, had strong ties to the Marine Transport Workers Industrial Union (MTWIU), an industrial union which formed a component of the broader IWW. The MTWIU created a point of contact between the continentally-based IWW and radical sailors and dockworkers in Latin America, Europe, Africa, and Asia. South African port cities such as Durban became home to radical syndicalist currents which were strongly integrated into the international socialist and syndicalist movement.

=== Predecessors ===
Returning to England from Australia, the famous English trade unionist Tom Mann helped to found a general union for industrial workers in South Africa in 1910. Though he made concessions to the rights of native South African peoples, the resulting organization was aimed primarily at white workers, something for which Mann would be heavily criticized. In addition, Mann cooperated heavily with existing craft unions, embodied by the local Trades Council. After Mann left, the union was reorganized, renamed itself to the Industrial Workers of the World (South Africa), adopted the IWW's famous Preamble as its creed, and contacted the IWW's General Headquarters in Chicago in the hopes of formal affiliation with the mainline IWW.

=== Prime years ===
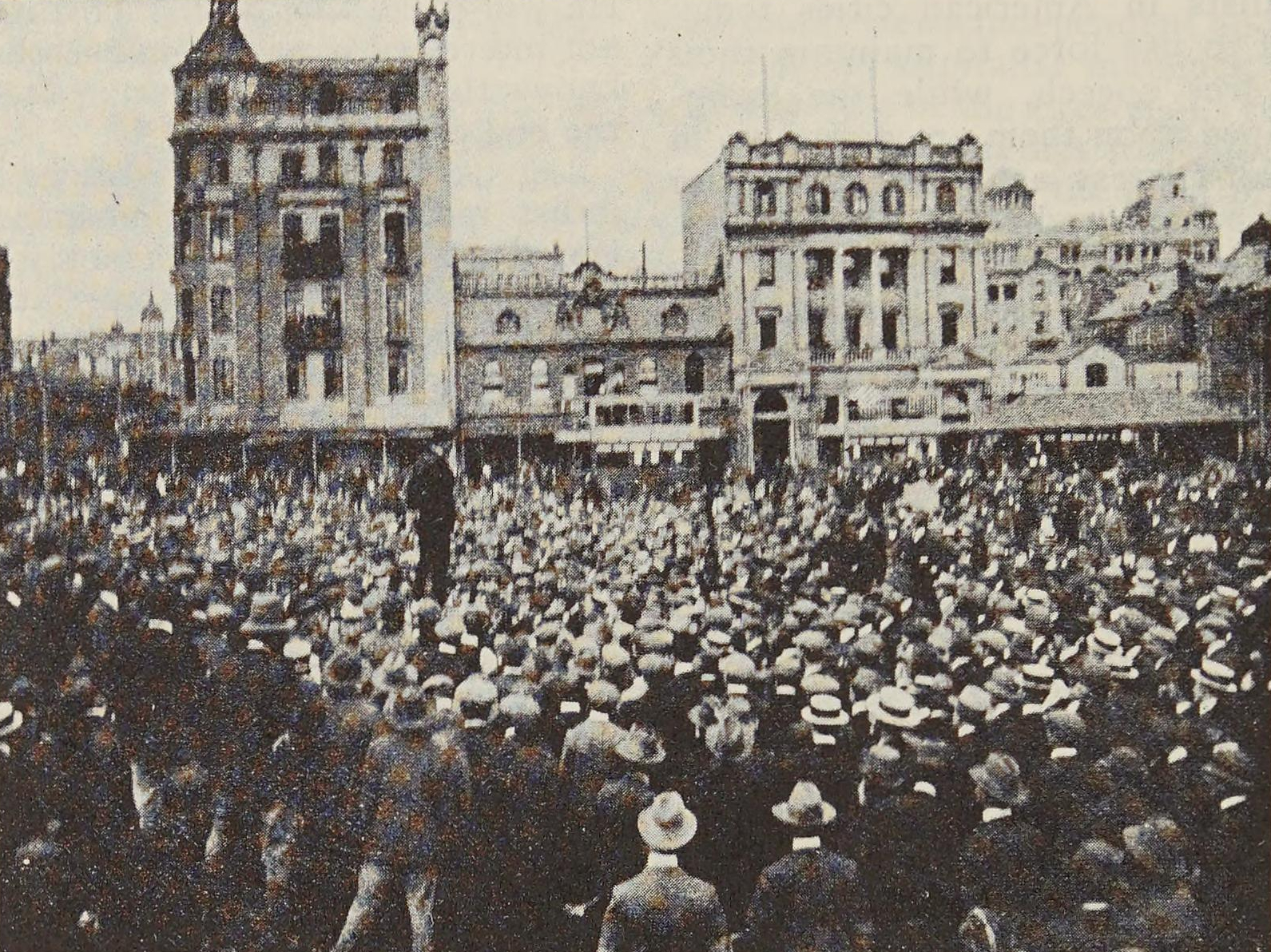
A. B. Dunbar addresses Johannesburg tramway strikers, 1911

The IWW (SA) established a stronghold in Johannesburg in June 1910 with a Scottish immigrant, Andrew Dunbar, as its first general secretary. Dunbar had immigrated to South Africa in 1906 and worked on railways in Natal as a blacksmith, but had been blacklisted as a result of leading a mass strike in 1909. After finding work on the Johannesburg tramways, Dunbar immediately went about organizing the predominantly white workers there. A major strike was waged in 1911 and won despite intense police repression. Despite this success, Dunbar, an anarchist, was ousted from his position under accusations of "intolerance, unpredictable behavior and intemperate attacks on comrades" in February 1912. Some accounts characterize this as a purge perpetrated by a faction led by Archie Crawford, the editor of Johannesburg's left-wing Voice of Labour newspaper. Crawford, a parliamentary socialist, was convinced that the IWW should affiliate itself with United Socialist Party in contradiction with the union's principles and Dunbar, in opposition to this idea, fell victim to Crawford's growing influence. Crawford would eventually abandon the idea of formal USP affiliation but became a leading figure in the union, going on a world tour speaking on behalf of the IWW (SA) and establishing closer contact to IWW sections in Australia and the United States.

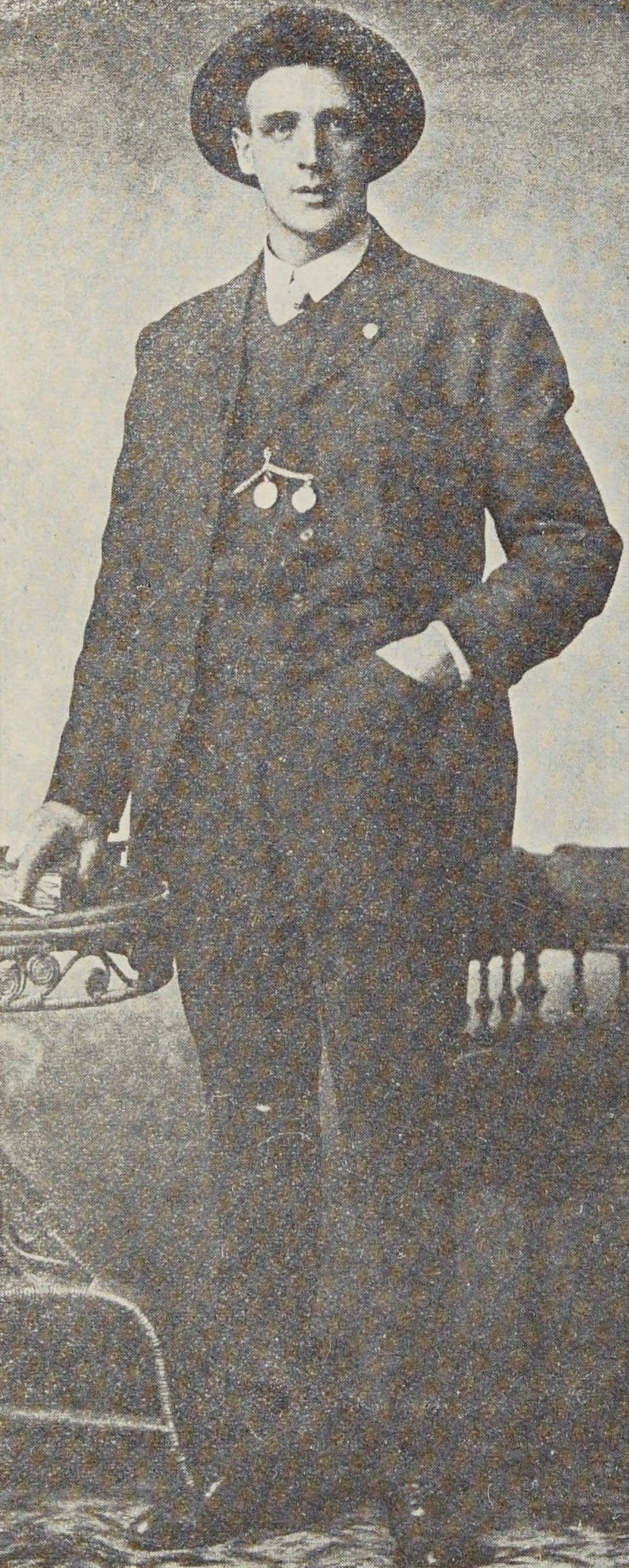
A. B. Dunbar, the first General Secretary of the IWW (SA)

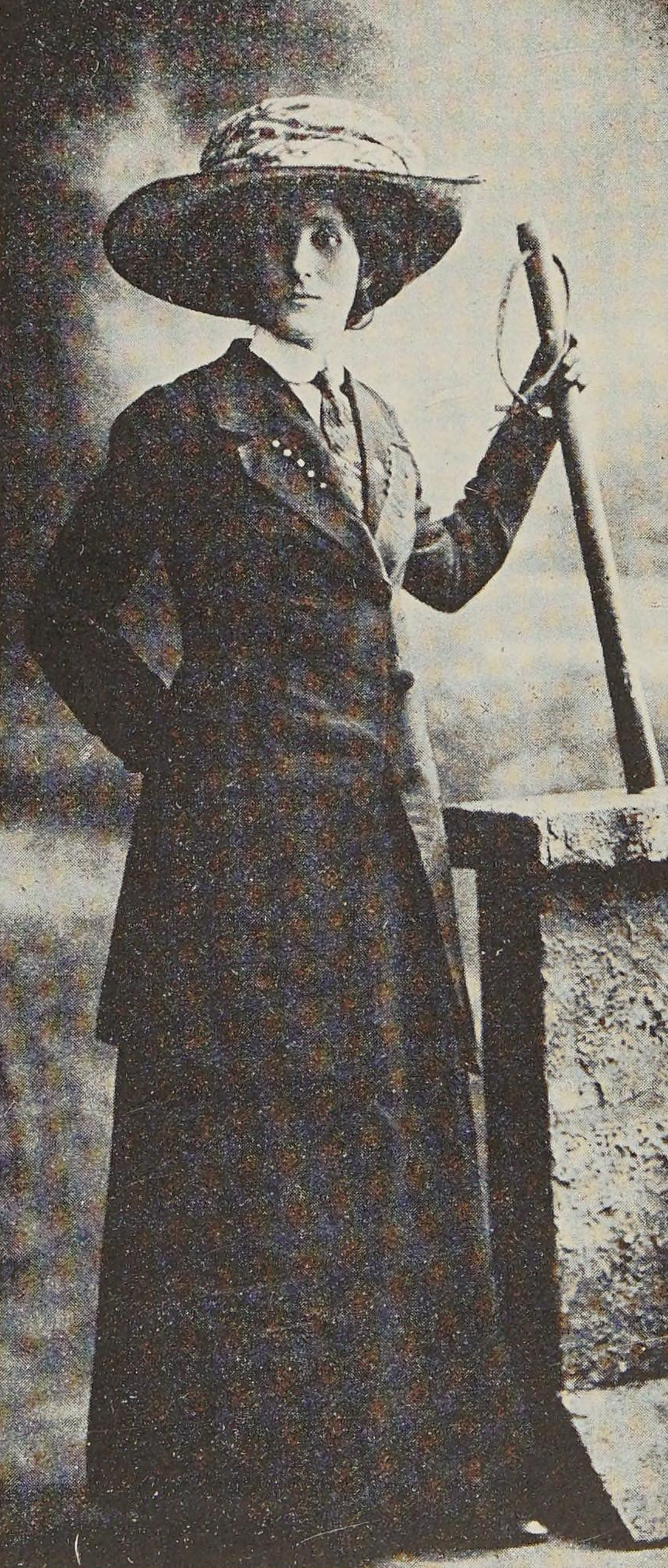
Mary Fitzgerald, a member of the IWW (SA) and the country's first female trade unionist

By 1913, the IWW would be organizing miners at the New Kleinfontein gold mine and staging a strike which would belatedly be joined into by the Transvaal Federation of Labour, which declared an industry-wide mining strike. The Transvaal provincial government responded by banning mass meetings and in the ensuing violence, 31 workers were killed. Striking miners responded by burning down a number of buildings in protest, as well as looting stores. The South African government targeted IWW leadership by deporting Crawford and many other socialists and prominent figures in the workers' movement in 1914, as well as blacklisting many others. This exodus of IWW figures from South Africa would lead to interesting outcomes: for example, Tom Glynn, a major figure in the Johannesburg tram workers' strike, would be a defendant in the infamous Sydney Twelve trial for sedition in Australia due to his opposition to the First World War. Nevertheless, the IWW in South Africa would swiftly decline after its peak in 1911-13.

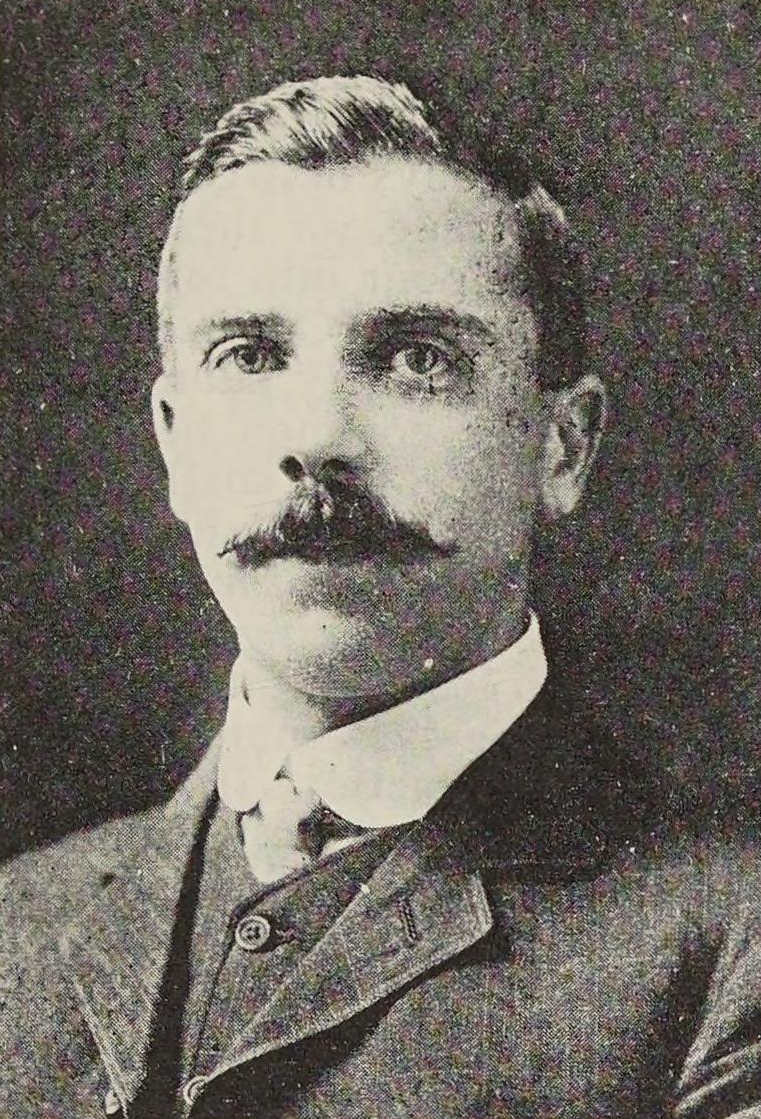
J. Davidson, the first Secretary of the IWW (SA)

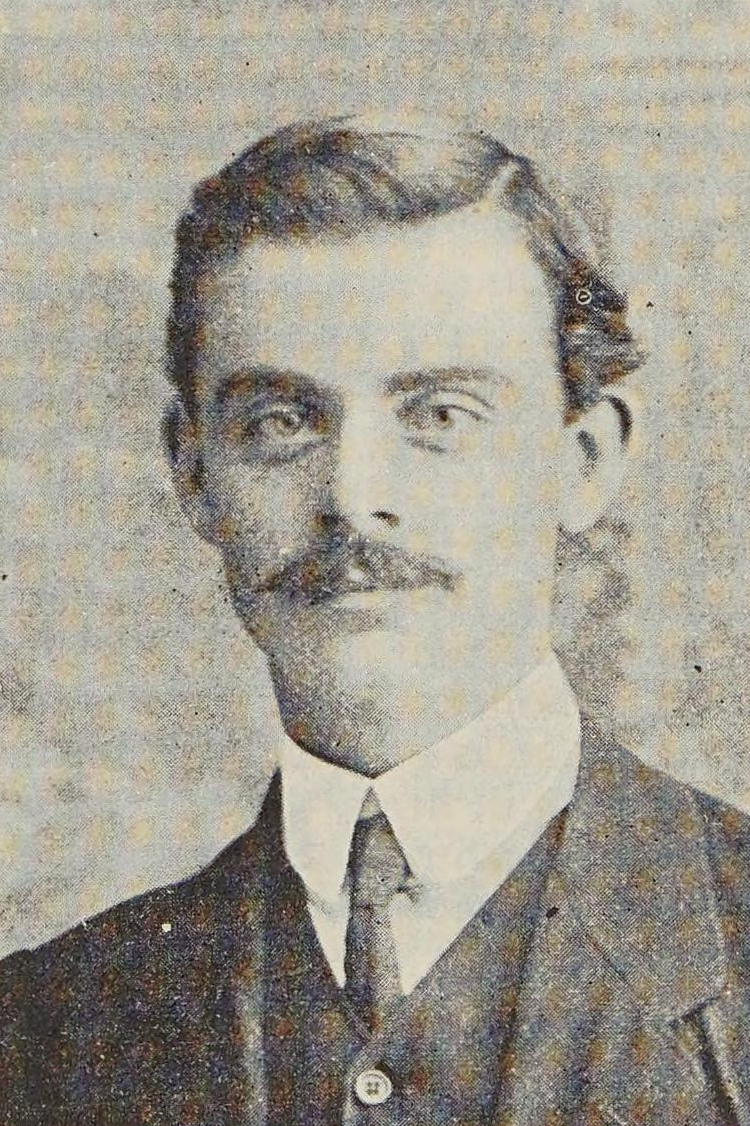
Archibald Crawford, a member of the IWW (SA) and editor of its official organ, Voice of Labour

By 1922, the IWW had completely disappeared from South Africa as an organization, but its ideas and methods would be adopted by a number of different groups with varying agendas and political positions. Archie Crawford returned to the country and became secretary of a new organization, the white-dominated South African Industrial Federation, while Andrew Dunbar attempted to start an Industrial Socialist League modelled along IWW lines. DeLeonist factions also tried to start a new organization along the lines of the Workers' International Industrial Union (WIIU, itself a splinter from the original IWW), but were crushed by the South African government despite having the vocal support from Zulu nationalists and anti-apartheid groups.

=== Successors ===
The IWW (SA)'s immediate successor was the Industrial Workers of Africa (IWA), which was formed out of the work of Andrew Dunbar's Industrial Socialist League. The ISL gained prominence as the First World War came to a close, and deepened ties between the coastal, largely white syndicalist movement, and native South Africans. In particular, the ISL would adopt one of its first native African leaders, Thomas William ("T. W.") Thibedi. Born in Vereeniging, Thibedi was the son of a Wesleyan minister and worked as a teacher at a church school in Johannesburg. After joining the ISL in 1916, Thibedi became involved in attempts to reform the mainstream South African trade unions, which generally were only open to whites. After being unable to make significant reforms, in late 1917 Thibedi and Dunbar helped to form the Industrial Workers of Africa. The IWA adopted the slogan "Sifuna Zonke!" ("We want everything!") and immediately set about publishing propaganda materials and trying to push the conservative Transvaal Native Congress to more radical positions.

In 1918, in response to the jailing in Johannesburg of 152 striking African workers, the IWA announced a general strike set for July 2. The IWA, believing the move to be premature, would call off the strike, yet thousands of miners would participate anyway. In response, the South African government would accuse three prominent IWA leaders of "incitement to public violence", resulting in two of them, Rueben Cetiwe and Hamilton Kraai, losing their jobs. Unfazed, the two radicals would shift in 1919 to campaigning against the racist pass laws which were enforced against native Africans under South Africa's apartheid system. With T. W. Thibedi leading the IWA in Johannesburg, Cetiwe and Kraai moved to Cape Town, where they established a second IWA branch. The Cape Town IWA began organizing dockworkers and helped to organize a multiracial strike along with two local unions, the Industrial and Commercial Union and the National Union of Railways and Harbour Servants. The strike was a failure, but would lay the groundwork for the amalgamation in 1921 of the IWA and a number of other black unions into the Industrial and Commercial Workers' Union (ICU), which embodied both syndicalism and Garveyism in South Africa.

Quickly spreading to modern-day Zimbabwe, Namibia, and Zambia, the ICU adopted a preamble similar to the IWW's and presented the One Big Union concept as its model for the reorganization of southern African society. With a base among poor sharecroppers and black urban communities, it was more well-positioned for growth than white-dominated organizations, and boasted 100,000 members in 1927. Though the American IWW was consistently supportive of the ICU and chronicled its victories and tribulations in the Industrial Worker, the principles of the two unions diverged as the ICU began to rely more heavily on the (white-run) court system and to recast itself as moderate and orthodox syndicalist, as opposed to the IWW's emphasis on direct action. Despite this moderate turn, the ICU would be severely repressed by the South African government and its loose organizational structure led to an unaccountable, corrupt leadership. The union steadily declined and would collapse in the 1930s, though its Zimbabwean section would prosper well into the 1950s.

Meanwhile, the South African Industrial Federation had become increasingly white-oriented, though Archie Crawford continued to applaud the work of the ICU. Rather than primarily supporting black workers or attempting to unite black and white workers (as the IWW had done in the United States), the SAIF sought to establish quotas for whites in well-paying jobs, and fought with defensive strikes when the quotes were broken as employers used (primarily black) scab labour to undermine the more highly-paid white workforce. This stance was exemplified by one of the white miners' slogans, "Workers of the World, Unite and Fight for a White South Africa". The IWW in the United States resoundingly condemned the SAIF's efforts at "white" unionism and compared it to the American Federation of Labor's efforts to maintain a white "labor aristocracy" in the United States. In any case, the SAIF's situation would prove untenable, as it would collapse under the weight of its failed strikes and be replaced by the South African Trades Union Council, which was run under Communist Party control and emphasized white skilled crafts over black and white "unskilled" labourers, following the Trades Union Council (TUC) model common in the British Empire at the time, thus fully reconstituting the white South African labour movement on a non-syndicalist, non-revolutionary basis.

== Legacy ==
By the mid-20th century, the SACP and later, Communist Party of South Africa (CPSA) would begin to write official histories of the South African labour movement, and establish a tradition of presenting all socialist groups before the Communist Party's formation as "oblivious to the country’s pressing racial problems or (at worst) overtly racist." The IWW's focus on labourers regardless of race, as opposed to skilled craftsmen, would be borne out by the growth of successors such as the ICU, despite their official repression.

== Revival attempts ==
After the dissolution of the Workers Solidarity Federation (WSF) in 1999, anarchist and syndicalist currents reformed into a number of different projects, such as Zabalaza Books (which published and printed pro-IWW literature), the Bikisha Media Collective, and the Zabalaza Anarchist Communist Front (ZACF). Among these was a Durban-based South African Regional Organising Committee of the IWW, which was the first time in almost a hundred years that a South African organization had been directly linked to the General Administration of the IWW. This would prove to be short-lived, however, as the committee soon dissolved. Another attempt at a South African IWW, this time based in Cape Town in the early 2010s, had similar results. As of late 2016, the IWW has no official presence in South Africa.
