= Charles Mzingeli =

Rhodesian trade unionist

Charles Mzingeli (1905–1980) was a trade unionist in Southern Rhodesia.

== Biography ==
Charles Mzingeli grew up on a Catholic mission station near Plumtree in Southern Rhodesia, now Zimbabwe. At the age of 14, he ran away to work on the railways, before moving to Bulawayo, where he became involved in the Industrial and Commercial Workers' Union (ICU), and worked with figures like 'Sergeant' Masotsha Ndlovu. The ICU, a radical trade union, started in South Africa in 1919, but spread into neighboring colonies in the 1920s and 1930s. In 1929, Mzingeli was sent to Harare Township at Salisbury as the ICU's organizing secretary. The ICU disintegrated in South Africa as well as in Southern Rhodesia in the 1930s, but it had pioneered black trade unionism in the latter, where it had played a major role in both urban and rural protests.

Mzigeli remained politically active, developing connections with the South African Communist Party and the short-lived Communist Party of Southern Rhodesia, which was associated with Doris Lessing. In the early 1940s he became involved with the Southern Rhodesian Labour Party, which had recently opened its doors to black people. In 1945, following a massive strike by black railway workers, Mzingeli relaunched the ICU as the Reformed Industrial Commercial Union (RICU), which was an important force in Harare into the 1950s, campaigning for black township residents, and reaching 7,000 members.

From the mid-1950s, Mzingelu was increasingly challenged by hard-line nationalists associated with the Southern Rhodesia African National Congress. The current, which was carried over into the Zimbabwe African People's Union (ZAPU), and then the Zimbabwe African National Union (ZANU) breakaway (today the ruling ZANU–PF) viewed rivals like Mizingeli as 'sell-outs'. It did not hesitate to use violence against opponents, and Mzingeli was forced out of politics.

Mzingeli was politically marginalised in the 1960s and 1970s by the nationalists, and died in 1980. Unlike fellow ICU stalwart, Masotsha Ndlovu, who later affiliated to ZAPU, Mzingeli has never been honored by the post-colonial state.
