= Anarchist Communist Federation =

Anarchist Communist Federation may refer to:

- Anarchist Federation (Britain), formerly the Anarchist Communist Federation
- Zabalaza Anarchist Communist Front in South Africa, formerly the Zabalaza Anarchist Communist Federation
