= Malayan Monitor =

Malayan Monitor was an anti-colonial and anti-imperialist newsletter published in Britain which distributed information on the Malayan independence movement during the Malayan Emergency. It was edited by Lim Hong Bee, a sympathiser of the Malayan National Liberation Army who lived in London.

According to historians Huw Bennett and Peter Romijn, the British Colonial Office was successful in countering many of the stories published in Malayan Monitor.

== Archives ==
Archived copies of Malayan Monitor can be found in the British National Archives in Kew.

== See also ==
- I saw the truth in Korea
- Alias Chin Peng: My Side of History
- The Bolsheviks are Coming
