= Cleariestown =

Cleariestown Baile de Cléir
- Village
- Location in Ireland
- Coordinates: 52°16′23″N 6°35′09″W
- Country: Ireland
- Province: Leinster
- County: Wexford
- Time zone: UTC+0 (WET)
  - Summer (DST): UTC-1 (IST (WEST))
- Area code: 053

Cleariestown (Irish: Baile de Cléir), or Cleristown, is a small village situated in the south of County Wexford, in Ireland. Cleariestown village has a Roman Catholic church (with adjoining cemetery).

== People ==
- Mary Fitzgerald, Irish-born South African political activist and trade unionist known as 'Pickhandle Mary'

== See also ==
- List of towns and villages in Ireland
