= SASBO – The Finance Union =

Trade union in South Africa

SASBO
- SASBO – The Finance Union
- Founded: 9 March 1916
- Headquarters: Johannesburg, South Africa
- Location: South Africa
- Members: 70,000
- Key people: Tsietsi Mafabatho President, Rosemary Rauleka Deputy President Joe Kokela, general secretary 2015 -2024
- Affiliations: COSATU
- Website: www.sasbo.org.za

SASBO – The Finance Union (formerly the South African Society of Bank Officials) is a trade union in South Africa. It was founded in 1916 and has a membership of 70,000.

== History ==
The union was founded in February 1916, in response to low staff numbers and high costs of living during World War I. In its early years, it represented workers throughout the British colonies of southern Africa. Its first secretary was Archie Crawford, who was also secretary of the South African Industrial Federation. In 1920, it held a one-day strike for higher pay, which was successful; it claimed this was the first strike of bank clerks anywhere in the British Empire. By 1926, it had 3,800 members, and was affiliated to the South African Trades Union Congress.

The union was long affiliated to the Trade Union Council of South Africa, and by 1980 it had 21,044 members, all of whom were white. In 1981, it absorbed the National Union of Bank Employees of South Africa, representing "coloured" workers, and the South African Bank Employees' Union, representing black workers. Later in the 1980s, it switched to the Federation of South African Labour Unions. In 1994, it absorbed the Finance Industry Workers' Union. Since 1995, SASBO has been affiliated with the Congress of South African Trade Unions; when it first joined, it was its only affiliate with a majority white membership.

Wildly regarded as a moderate Trade Union that is non-political, it believes in capitalism with a conscience and supports health profits but not profiteering.

Failed takeover bid

At the end of 1999 and the beginning of 2000, Sasbo played a pivotal role in opposing Nedcor Bank’s attempted takeover of the Standard Bank Group. Representing members employed in both major banks, Sasbo was deeply concerned about the potential job losses that such a large-scale merger would cause. To safeguard its members’ interests, the union petitioned then Minister of Finance, Trevor Manuel, as well as the Competition Commission, urging them to block the bid. Ultimately, the government withheld approval, and the merger did not proceed.

== Leadership ==
=== General Secretaries ===
1916: Archie Crawford
1923: F. R. Swan
1943: Richard Haldane
1964: Tom Alexander
1983: André Malherbe
Ben Smith
1994: Graeme Rowan
1999: Shaun Oelschig
2013:
2016: Joe Kokela

=== Presidents ===
Andre Malherbe
Peter McQueen
1990s: Keith Alberts
2000: Joe Kokela
2016: Moses Lekota
2022: Tsietsi Mafabatho
