= Archie Crawford =

South African trade unionist (1883–1924)

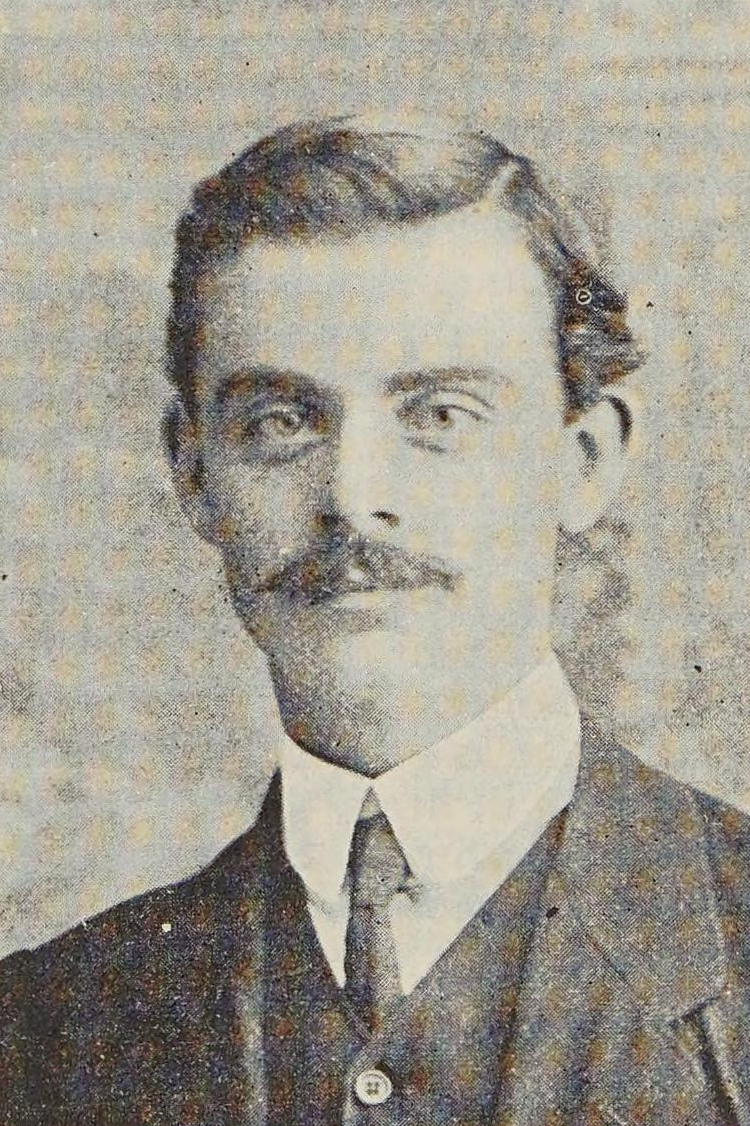
Crawford c. 1911

Archibald Crawford (1883 – 23 December 1924) was a Scottish-born South African trade union leader.

== Biography ==
Born in Glasgow, Crawford completed an apprenticeship as a fitter, before joining the British Army. He served in the Second Boer War, after which, he settled in South Africa. He became a fireman for the Central South African Railways, then a fitter in the railway workshops. He joined the Amalgamated Society of Engineers in 1903, and became secretary of the Pretoria Trades and Labour Council. In 1906, he became involved in action against lay offs, which led to his own dismissal from the railways.

After his sacking, Crawford was a founder member of the Transvaal Independent Labour Party (ILP). He was initially only supportive of white workers, but after hearing Keir Hardie speak, he changed his views, and began arguing that the party should admit non-white workers. He stood unsuccessfully in the 1907 Transvaal general election, but won a seat on Johannesburg Municipal Council. Soon after, he was elected as secretary of the ILP.

In 1909, Crawford formed the Johannesburg Socialist Society, which competed with the ILP for members. He also edited its newspaper, the Voice of Labour. Although he remained a member of the ILP, he lost his leadership roles. When the ILP merged into the new South African Labour Party, Crawford refused to join, and instead stood in the 1910 South African general election as an independent socialist. He received few votes, and instead decided to focus on his trade unionism. He became a leading figure in the Industrial Workers of the World, and went on an international speaking tour to promote the movement.

Crawford met Mary Fitzgerald in 1911. For his activity, in 1914, he was deported, and Fitzgerald came with him to England. Protests to the Government of South Africa permitted them to return, and Crawford was elected as general secretary of the South African Industrial Federation (SAIF), which came to represent 60,000 workers. In this role, he also became the first secretary of the South African Society of Bank Officials. Crawford and Fitzgerald married in 1919, and Crawford remained leader of the SAIF until it collapsed in 1922.
