= International Socialist League =

- Abbreviation: ISL
- Founder: David Ivon Jones
- Founded: September 1915
- Dissolved: 12 February 1921
- Split from: South African Labour Party
- Merged into: CPSA
- Ideology: Libertarian socialism Marxism; De Leonism; Syndicalism
- Political position: Far-left

The International Socialist League of South Africa was the earliest major Marxist party in South Africa, and a predecessor of the South African Communist Party. The ISL was founded around the syndicalist politics of the Industrial Workers of the World and Daniel De Leon.

== History ==
Formed in September 1915, it established branches across much of South Africa (excluding the Western Cape). The party was formed by anti-war dissidents within the South African Labour Party following the outbreak of the First World War and South Africa's entry into the war.

While early attempts to recruit white workers failed, the ISL soon came to the attention of the young African National Congress, (then called the "South African Native National Congress") and several prominent early ANC members attended ISL meetings. By September 1917 the ISL had helped to form the first black African trade union in the country, the Industrial Workers of Africa. While its founders were mainly drawn from the radical wing of the white working class, the movement would develop a substantial black African, Coloured and Indian membership.

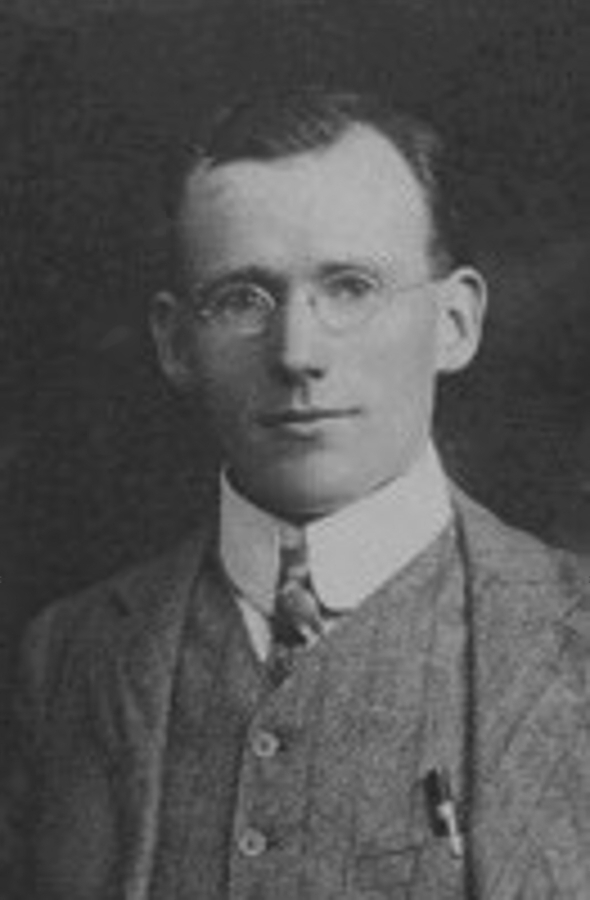
David Ivon Jones was a founder and influential member of the ISL

Following the Russian Revolution in 1917, the ISL became enthusiastic supporters of the Bolsheviks. David Ivon Jones, co-founder of the ISL and editor of the league's organ The International welcomed the revolution with an article titled "Dawn of the World." The article calls the revolution "an unfolding of the world-wide Commonwealth of Labour, which if the oppressed of all lands only knew...would sweep them into transports of gladness." This enthusiasm for the Bolsheviks would ultimately lead the ISL to merge with several other socialist organizations to form the Communist Party of South Africa in 1921.

The ISL became defunct following its merge into the Communist Party of South Africa (SACP) in 1921 but, provided many notable early figures to the Communist Party. The centrality of the ISL in the formation of the SACP left a political mark on the party for years to come, and was responsible for a strong syndicalist influence on the early politics of the SACP.

In his address to the 2015 Biennial National Conference of the South African Jewish Board of Deputies, South African President Jacob Zuma credited South African Jews for being "among the first to organise the South African working class" as some Jewish activists "were among the founders of the International Socialist League."

== See also ==
- Socialist Labor Party
- South African Communist Party
- Industrial Workers of the World
