= Zabalaza Anarchist Communist Front =

- Abbreviation: ZACF
- Founded: 1 May 2003; 23 years ago
- Headquarters: Johannesburg
- Ideology: Anarcho-communism; Platformism; Especifismo
- Colours: Red Black

Website
- zabalaza.net

The Zabalaza Anarchist Communist Front (ZACF, also known as ZabFront or simply as Zabalaza), formerly known as the Zabalaza Anarchist Communist Federation (ZabFed), is a platformist–especifista anarchist political organisation in South Africa, based primarily in Johannesburg. The word zabalaza means "struggle" or "active rebellion" in isiZulu, isiXhosa, siSwati and isiNdebele. Initially, as ZabFed, it was a federation of pre-existing collectives, mainly in Soweto and Johannesburg. It is now a unitary organisation based on individual applications for membership, describing itself as a "federation of individuals". Historically the majority of members have been people of colour. Initially the ZACF had sections in both South Africa and Swaziland. The two sections were split in 2007, but the Swazi group faltered in 2008. Currently the ZACF also recruits in Zimbabwe. Members have experienced oppression in South Africa and Swaziland.

The ZACF is rooted in the Organisational Platform of the General Union of Anarchists (Draft) by the Delo truda group, but it does not accept the document uncritically. The ZACF is also inspired by the pamphlet Towards a Fresh Revolution, written by the Friends of Durruti, a grouping of Confederación Nacional del Trabajo (CNT, or National Confederation of Labour) members, during the Spanish Revolution, as well as by Georges Fontenis' post-war pamphlet Manifesto of Libertarian Communism. More recently it has come under the influence of South American especifismo, a tendency which originated in the Federación Anarquista Uruguaya (FAU, or Uruguayan Anarchist Federation).

ZACF members are expected to be committed, convinced anarchist communist militants who must be in general agreement with the platformist principles of theoretical and tactical unity, collective responsibility, and federalism. Its activities include study and theoretical development, anarchist agitation and participation in class struggle activism.

As a platformist–especifista organisation, the ZACF subscribes to the idea of an "active minority". This means that the ZACF, unlike certain anarcho-syndicalist organizations, does not seek to build purely anarchist mass movements or unions; nor does it seek to turn existing social movements into anarchist-only movements. Rather, in the tradition of social insertion championed by the Federação Anarquista do Rio de Janeiro (FARJ, or Anarchist Federation of Rio de Janeiro), the ZACF works within existing movements to fight for the "leadership of anarchist ideas". This entails the implementation of anarchist principles within such movements, along with a revolutionary anarchist programme. This is because the ZACF holds that the strength of trade unions, social movements and other organizations of the working class lies in their ability to unite the greatest number of workers regardless of their political, religious or ideological affiliations. At the same time, the ZACF believes such movements can only undertake a revolutionary transformation of society when they are won to revolutionary anarchist positions.

In 2015, the organisation came into controversy after journalists, Alexander Reid Ross and Joshua Stephens, released a series of articles accusing a founder of the organisation, Michael Schmidt, of being a white supremacist.

== History ==
The ZACF is the most recent in a rather short line of South African anarchist organizations stretching back to the early 1990s, from which it has inherited some members. This includes the merger of the International Socialist League (ISL) and Industrial Socialist League into the Communist Party of South Africa (CPSA) in 1921 and the destruction of the semi-syndicalist Industrial and Commercial Workers' Union of Africa (ICU) in the 1930s.

The Workers' Solidarity Federation dissolved in 1999. It was succeeded by two anarchist collectives: the Bikisha Media Collective and Zabalaza Books. These two groups co-produced Zabalaza: A Journal of Southern African Revolutionary Anarchism, which has since become the journal of the ZACF.

== Links to other organizations ==
The ZACF, as ZabFed, was part of the short-lived International Libertarian Solidarity (ILS), as were its predecessors Bikisha Media Collective and Zabalaza Books.

Following the disbanding of the ILS, the ZACF became part of the platformist–especifista Anarkismo network. As such, the ZACF has close links to the member organizations of the Anarkismo network; particularly with the Workers' Solidarity Movement (WSM) in Ireland, Common Struggle – Libertarian Communist Federation (formerly NEFAC) in the United States, the Federazione dei Comunisti Anarchici (FdCA, or Federation of Anarchist Communists) in Italy, the FAU in Uruguay, Alternative libertaire (AL, or Libertarian Alternative) in France, the Federación Anarco-Comunista de Argentina (FACA, or Anarcho-Communist Federation of Argentina), the FARJ in Rio de Janeiro, the Organização Anarquista Socialismo Libertário (OASL, or Libertarian Socialism Anarchist Organisation) in São Paulo and the Federação Anarquista Gaúcha (FAG, or Gaúcha Anarchist Federation) in Rio Grande do Sul. (The latter three are members of the Coordenação Anarquista Brasileira, or Brazilian Anarchist Coordination.) It has also had intermittent contact with the Awareness League in Nigeria and with numerous smaller anarchist collectives in Africa. It retains contact with syndicalist unions linked to the erstwhile ILS, such as the Confederación General del Trabajo (CGT, or General Confederation of Labour) in Spain.

== Publications ==
The ZACF publishes Zabalaza: A Journal of Southern African Revolutionary Anarchism. This journal is the organization's theoretical journal and contains ideological and analytical articles aimed to benefit the anarchist communist movement in general, and the southern African anarchist communist movement in particular. Additionally, it publicizes and promotes the official line of the ZACF as determined by the organization's membership. The ZACF's other major publication is Zabalaza.net, the official website of the organization.

== Zabalaza Books ==
Zabalaza Books is an anarchist publishing project linked to the ZACF. It is an anarchist literature mail order project that publishes and distributes classic and contemporary anarchist books, pamphlets, music, and videos in the southern African region. It originated as an underground collective in the 1990s at the end of apartheid. The topics covered include anarchism, revolutionary unionism, women's liberation, revolutionary history, national liberation and decolonization, and many others. It distributes much of the literature in PDF format on its website.
