= The Bolsheviks are Coming =

1919 communist propaganda leaflet

- Author: David Ivon Jones
- Language: English, Zulu, and Sotho
- Subject: Racism
- Genre: Political literature
- Publication date: 1919
- Publication place: South Africa

The Bolsheviks are Coming (1919) is a political leaflet written by Welsh communist and civil rights activist David Ivon Jones and co-authored by LHH Greene. The leaflet's authors were arrested, and imprisoned after the first major court case against communism in South African history.

Written and distributed in the South African city of Pietermaritzburg, the leaflet was addressed 'to the workers of South Africa, Black as well as White'. Written in English, Zulu, and Sotho, The Bolsheviks are Coming! declared that:

While the Black worker is oppressed, the white worker cannot be free.

The publishing of this leaflet gained the attention of the South African government, which sought to censor its spread and punish the authors for promoting communism and racial equality. Both Jones and Greene were arrested, fined, and sentenced to four months in prison for the crime of publishing "The Bolsheviks are Coming!". However, this sentence was quashed on appeal. This court case is notable for being the first major court case against communism in South African history.
