= David Ivon Jones =

Welsh communist and anti-apartheid activist (1883–1924)

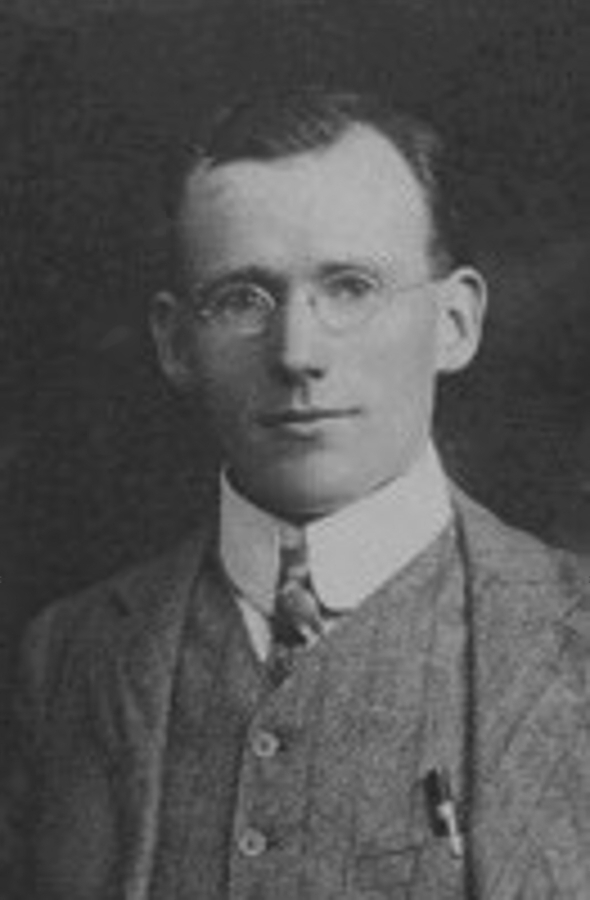
- Jones circa 1910
- Born: 18 October 1883; Aberystwyth, Ceredigion, Wales
- Died: 13 April 1924 (aged 40); Yalta, Soviet Union
- Resting place: Novodevichy Cemetery, Moscow
- Other name: "The Delegate for Africa"
- Occupations: Journalist, grocer, trade unionist
- Organization(s): Industrial Workers of Africa (IWA). War on War League.
- Known for: Opposition to apartheid. Translating many of Lenin's works into English. Founding member of the Communist Party of South Africa. Imprisoned for promoting both racial equality and communism
- Notable work: The Bolsheviks are Coming (1919)
- Political party: South African Labour Party (1911–1915), International Socialist League (1915–1921); South African Communist Party (1921–1924); Communist Party of Great Britain (CPGB) (unknown date)
- Relatives: John Ivon Jones (grandfather)

David Ivon Jones (18 October 1883 – 13 April 1924) was a South Africa-based Welsh communist, newspaper editor, and political prisoner — most famous as a leading opponent of South African racial segregation, and for being one of the first white activists in South Africa to fight for equal rights for black South Africans. Jones was also one of the founders of the Communist Party of South Africa, and in 1917 played a leading role in the formation of South Africa's first all-black trade union: the Industrial Workers of Africa (IWA). Later in life he became one of the first people to translate Vladimir Lenin's works into English. He also started some of the first night-classes for African workers, and in 1919 was convicted and imprisoned for publishing a leaflet supporting both communism and racial equality, in what was the first major court case against communism in South Africa's history. He is credited as being the most influential South African socialist of his time.

Upon first arriving in South Africa in 1910, Jones was a Christian liberal and became a supporter of the pro-segregationist party, the South African Labour Party (SALP), becoming their general secretary in 1914. However, shortly afterwards he resigned as the leader of the SALP in 1915, became a communist and an atheist, and spent the remainder of his life fighting against racial segregation, capitalism, and colonialism. In later life, he became a strong supporter of the Bolsheviks and their leader Vladimir Lenin, who in turn was impressed with Jones's reports of class and racial divisions in South Africa.

Jones was also a supporter of the Communist Party of Great Britain (CPGB) and is considered an iconic figure and hero by many socialist and anti-apartheid political parties, including the South African Communist Party, the Communist Party of Britain, and the African National Congress.

== Early life, family and background ==
=== Childhood and family ===
David Ivon Jones was born on 18 October 1883, in Aberystwyth, Wales. His parents died when he was very young, leaving him to be raised by various family members. In both Aberystwyth and Lampeter, Jones worked as a grocer in the family business. The Jones family hailed from a poor and mountainous farming region of Wales called Mynydd-Bach, which had once been the centre of resistance by tenant farmers and squatters to attempts by local landowners to enclose common land. His grandfather, John Ivan Jones, was a leading campaigner for radical causes and Liberalism in Aberystwyth. It is believed that his grandfather's beliefs were a strong influence on David.

=== Early religious beliefs ===
In his youth, Jones became strongly influenced by the beliefs of the former Unitarian minister George Eyre Evans, who inspired Jones to abandon his family's Calvinistic Methodist beliefs and adopt Unitarianism. In 1901, Jones moved to live in Lampeter where he encountered many differing views on Christianity before returning to his native Aberystwyth and joining the Unitarian congregation. Jones was often berated by his neighbours for his Unitarianist beliefs and confronted by religious opponents at his workplace and on the streets for his choice to join the people of the "Y Smotyn Du" (The Black Spot). Among his shop account records, it was discovered by historians that Jones had an interest in philosophy, often writing quotes by Immanuel Kant and Plato. Jones became the treasurer and secretary of the Aberystwyth Unitarian chapel, which soon developed into a centre for radical left-wing politics. The records of this chapel show that striking miners were invited by the congregation and that the congregation also raised money for Penrhyn quarrymen who had been locked out of work for three years. The chapel records also show that the congregation hosted Gertrude von Petzold who was famous for being the first woman to be ordained in Britain.

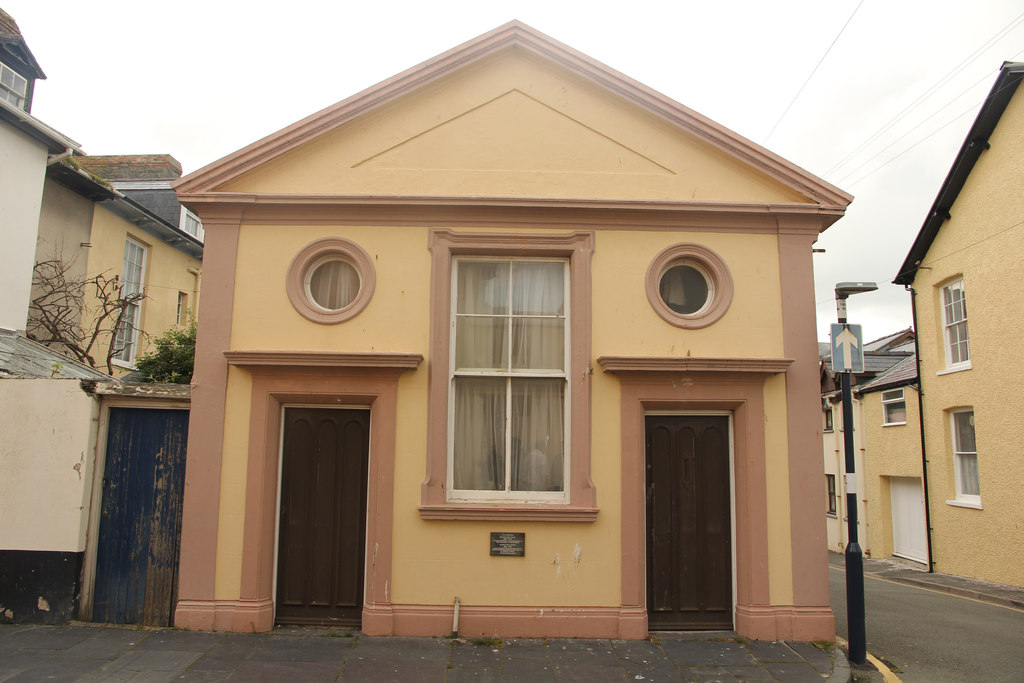
Aberystwyth Unitarian chapel, with a plaque to commemorate David Ivon Jones

According to researcher Islwyn ap Nicholas, Jones was at this point a "Christian humanist":

"Ivon appeared to be a Christian Humanist, unless this is a contradiction in terms. Indeed he was more of a humanist than anything else and he always stressed the social and economic teachings of Jesus".

=== Leaving Wales ===
At some point during his 20s, Jones contracted tuberculosis, a common disease in Wales in the early 20th century. Records from his chapel note that he left Cardiganshire "to seek health in New Zealand", following many people in his family who had migrated to British colonies. In 1907, Jones left Wales and then spent three years living in New Zealand. In 1920, he moved to the Orange Free State in South Africa, where he worked in a shop which was owned by two of his brothers.

== Activities in South Africa (1910–1920) ==
=== Arrival in Africa (1911) ===
David Ivon Jones arrived in South Africa in November 1910, seeking treatment for tuberculosis. Early after his arrival there, he became increasingly aware of the oppression of native black Africans, especially women, viewing their oppressed position in racist South African society as "slaves in everything but name". Although at this point in his life Jones still held many bigoted views towards Africans, witnessing the oppression of black people in South Africa triggered him to begin questioning his own views on race, and his views gradually became more ambivalent. Although he had not yet broken with segregation, his writings from mid-1911 record his gradual shift in attitudes towards black people, attacking people who used derogatory language against black workers.

Further commenting on his early views on the mistreatment of black workers, Jones writes: "the white man only considers his marketable value. When he begins to find that he has responsibilities towards the black man other than sending him missionaries, there will be a changed South Africa'.

=== South African Labour Party - SALP (1911–1915) ===
In 1911, Jones welcomed the creation of the "South African Native National Congress", later becoming the African National Congress (ANC), viewing its creation as a step towards "national self-consciousness". Despite his sympathetic views for black Africans and the ANC, Jones was at this stage of his life a Liberal Christian activist, and in 1911 he joined a pro-segregationist political party called the "South African Labour Party" (SALP). Although not yet an anti-capitalist and supporter of communism, he held a deep hatred towards South Africa's Randlords, the capitalists who monopolised the gold and diamond industries.

==== The Witwatersrand uprising (1913) ====
During his time in the SALP, many events in South African politics would force him to reconsider his Liberal and Christian beliefs, and pushed him to become a revolutionary communist and an atheist. From May to June 1913, white miners near Witwatersrand rioted in protest over their working conditions before the riots were suppressed by the police and military. The strike started as a peaceful event at the New Kleinfontein mine, with miners angry and bitter over issues of work time and deaths by disease. Soon afterwards, martial law was declared to stop attempts by workers to start a general strike, events that further pushed Jones's political beliefs towards Marxist socialism. The government immediately sent troops to crush the strike and using dragoons to indiscriminately fire their guns towards fleeing civilians, killing 20 and wounding 200–400. The government's murder of unarmed and innocent civilians would plunge Johannesburg into further chaos, crowds rioted and burnt down the railway station and the Star newspaper. Rioters also looted the city centre, and anti-Indian violence began spreading across South Africa. Hearing of these events, Jones left his job as a clerk in a power station and dedicated himself to supporting unionised miners. The SALP also became a target of government oppression, with the party's printing machines destroyed and their offices raided by government troops. During this time, Jones barely escaped being arrested and deported.

=== Turn towards communism and atheism (1914–1915) ===
In August 1914, Jones was elected the general secretary of SALP, during a time when its membership and popular support was rapidly expanding. The large increase in membership and support transformed the SALP, and the wave of new overwhelmingly white working-class members brought with them racist views towards black Africans, with many of these new members arguing that they should be paid more than black people. Many older SALP members agreed and the party stuck to its racist and pro-segregationist beliefs. While many of these new members moved further politically right-wing, some veterans of the party, including Jones, himself, began moving further left-wing.

In 1914, Jones underwent a personal crisis, he became depressed and stopped attending church as often. He began collecting left-wing political and philosophical publications from Britain, including works by Karl Marx, Friedrich Engels, Karl Kautsky, H. G. Wells, Leo Tolstoy, Ramsay MacDonald, and began studying a vast range of political philosophies, including Marxism. When he emerged from his depression, he found a new enthusiasm for political work and had completely abandoned his previous Christian beliefs.

Come the outbreak of the First World War, the SALP membership was split over whether or not to support the war, with many of those opposing WWI then co-founding the "War on War League" in September 1914. The War on War League claimed to be an independent body of anti-war activists that worked within the SALP, and although Jones did not join them he did share their views. His firm opposition to WWI, along with his growing socialist and atheist beliefs heavily influenced by British socialist publications, led him to resigning as the SALP general secretary in September 1915 and he became the leader of a breakaway group called the International Socialist League (ISL). After leaving the SALP, Jones dedicated the remainder of his life to promoting racial equality and fighting against both colonialism and capitalism.

He became the first editor of the ISL's weekly newspaper, The International, which he used to support Vladimir Lenin and the Bolsheviks and to later in his life use to explain the importance of Russia's 1917 February and October revolutions.

=== Support for black Africans (1915–1920) ===
After leaving the South African Labour Party (SALP) in 1915, Jones dedicated the remainder of his life to supporting both communism and supporting racial equality between black and white workers. In 1917, he became the moving figure in establishing South Africa's first-ever all-black trade union, a short-lived organisation known as the Industrial Workers of Africa (IWA). He wrote agitation leaflets for the IWA, addressed to the Bantu, calling for racial equality and proletarian solidarity, however when he could not find a translator the work of translating the leaflets fell upon undercover police spies who had been sent to infiltrate the IWA. The IWA took part in many strikes and industrial disputes in 1918; however, the organisation was crushed via a combination of government repression and police infiltration.

Becoming increasingly aware of the potential of black South Africans in the labour movement, Jones prompted the International Socialist League (ISL) to start publishing socialist works in native African languages, demanding equal status for Black Africans in South African workplaces, and challenging colonial racism. During this time in his life, the importance of racial equality between the black and white proletariat became the central focus of his writings. Statements such as the following published by Jones in The International became common sights within his writings.

"An Internationalism which does not concede the fullest rights which the Native working class is capable of claiming will be a sham. One of the justifications for our withdrawal from the Labour Party is that it gives us untrammelled freedom to deal, regardless of political fortunes, with the great and fascinating problem of the Native."

Due to ill health, Jones resigned from his position in the ISL in 1919 and briefly worked in Mozambique, where he contracted malaria.

==== The Bolsheviks are Coming! (1919) ====
In 1919, working alongside activist LHH Greene, Jones co-authored a leaflet promoting both communism and racial equality. Titled The Bolsheviks are Coming, this leaflet was written and distributed in Pietermaritzburg, and was addressed "to the workers of South Africa, Black as well as White". Written in English, Zulu, and Sotho, The Bolsheviks are Coming! declared that:

"While the Black worker is oppressed, the white worker cannot be free."

The publishing of this leaflet would gain the attention of the South African government, which sought to censor its spread and punish the authors for promoting communism and racial equality. Both Jones and Greene were arrested, fined, and sentenced to four months in prison for the crime of publishing The Bolsheviks are Coming!. However, this sentence was quashed on appeal. This court case is notable for being the first major court case against communism in South African history.

== Departure from Africa to Europe (1920–1924) ==
In 1920, before Jones permanently departed from South Africa later that year, one of his last major actions was to co-found communist-themed night schools for black workers in South Africa, along with famous botanist Eddie Roux. These night schools became some of the first recorded instances of night schools for black workers in the history of South Africa.

In November 1920, Jones left South Africa for Europe, but due to his declining health stayed in Nice. In March 1921, while still living in Nice, he wrote a report for the executive committee of the Communist International (ECCI) titled Communism in South Africa. This report was a highly detailed and erudite survey of the complex political, social and economic conditions of South Africa, with a heavy emphasis on analysing the country's racial and class divisions. It is believed by researchers of communist history that Jones's survey had a major impact on Vladimir Lenin.

"Africa Awakening"

"[The Negro] is the greatest living accuser of capitalist civilization. The wealth of England and America is built upon his bones. The slave ships of Bristol and New York, with good Quaker prayers to speed them, founded the fortunes of many a Christian home. Every capitalist government is drenched with the blood of the Negro.

British capitalism in South Africa, the French in the Cameroons, Belgium in the Congo, and the German Empire in Damaraland - they all constitute the blackest record in human history of mass slaughters and human violation of every primitive human right continued up to the present day. Even the liberation of the American slave was only an incident of a civil war between two factions of property holders engaged in a quarrel over the forms of exploitation, and was not the aim of the war as is commonly supposed. And as an aftermath of that war there was created a social attitude towards the Negro race which leaves the one time chattel slaves still degraded outcasts among the peoples of the earth."

— David Ivon Jones, The International, 13 July 1923

=== Life in Russia ===
After briefly visiting his home country of Wales, Jones was invited to the 1921 Third Congress of the Communist International held in Moscow, as a delegate from South Africa, alongside political activist Sam Barlin. On 12 July, at the Third Congress of the Communist International, Jones proposed that the congress:

"resolves to further the movement among the working masses of Africa ... and desires the Executive to take a direct initiative in promoting the awakening of the African Negroes as a necessary step to the world revolution".

Further elaborating on his views on communism and black Africans, he said:

"They (black Africans) are ripe for communism. They are absolutely propertyless. They are stripped of every vestige of property and caste prejudice. The African natives are a labouring race, still fresh from ancestral communal traditions. I will not say that the native workers are well organised, or have a great conception of communism or even trade unionism, as yet. But they have made several attempts at liberation by way of industrial solidarity. They only need awakening. They know they are slaves, but lack the knowledge how to free themselves ... The solution of the problem, the whole world problem is being worked out in South Africa on the field of the working-class movement".

After hearing Jones's speech, the congress agreed that he should represent South Africa as a consultant to the Comintern executive committee. Due to his failing health, Jones remained in Moscow and was not able to attend the founding congress of the Communist Party of South Africa (SACP) near the end of July. Despite his not being present at the founding congress to his failing health, the party still recognised Jones as a founding member. Distancing himself from frontline political activism due to his failing health, Jones dedicated his time to learning Russian and became one of the first people to translate much of Lenin's writings into English. He also wrote many articles for publications in Britain, America, and for South African communists. Writing in February 1922 for The Communist Review, the journal of the Communist Party of Great Britain (CPGB), Jones expressed his support for the Bolshevik's support for radical peasants in the fight against the Russian Orthodox Church. His writings in 1924 show that he was actively encouraging English-speaking socialists to read and study the works of Vladimir Lenin, alongside other Russian political figures, including Martov and Plekhanov. The years of political turmoil had taken a toll on Jones's health, and so the Comintern dispatched him to Yalta to recover from another tuberculosis attack. Writing to South African communist leader WH Bill Andrews, Jones said: "We stand for Bolshevism, and in all minds Bolshevism stands for the Native worker."

In July 1923, Jones wrote an article titled "Africa Awakening" in support of the creation of a "World Negro Congress", and he further urged white activists in Belgium, Britain and America to put special emphasis on the liberation of African people from racism and capitalism.

In a final political testament written on his deathbed, Jones urged his fellow communists to continue supporting revolution against imperialism and capitalism, and to "carry out the great revolutionary mission imposed on colonies in general and South Africa in particular with revolutionary devotion and dignity, concentrating on shaking the foundations of world capitalism and British imperialism".

Soon afterwards, Jones died on 13 April 1924 from tuberculosis.

== Death and legacy ==
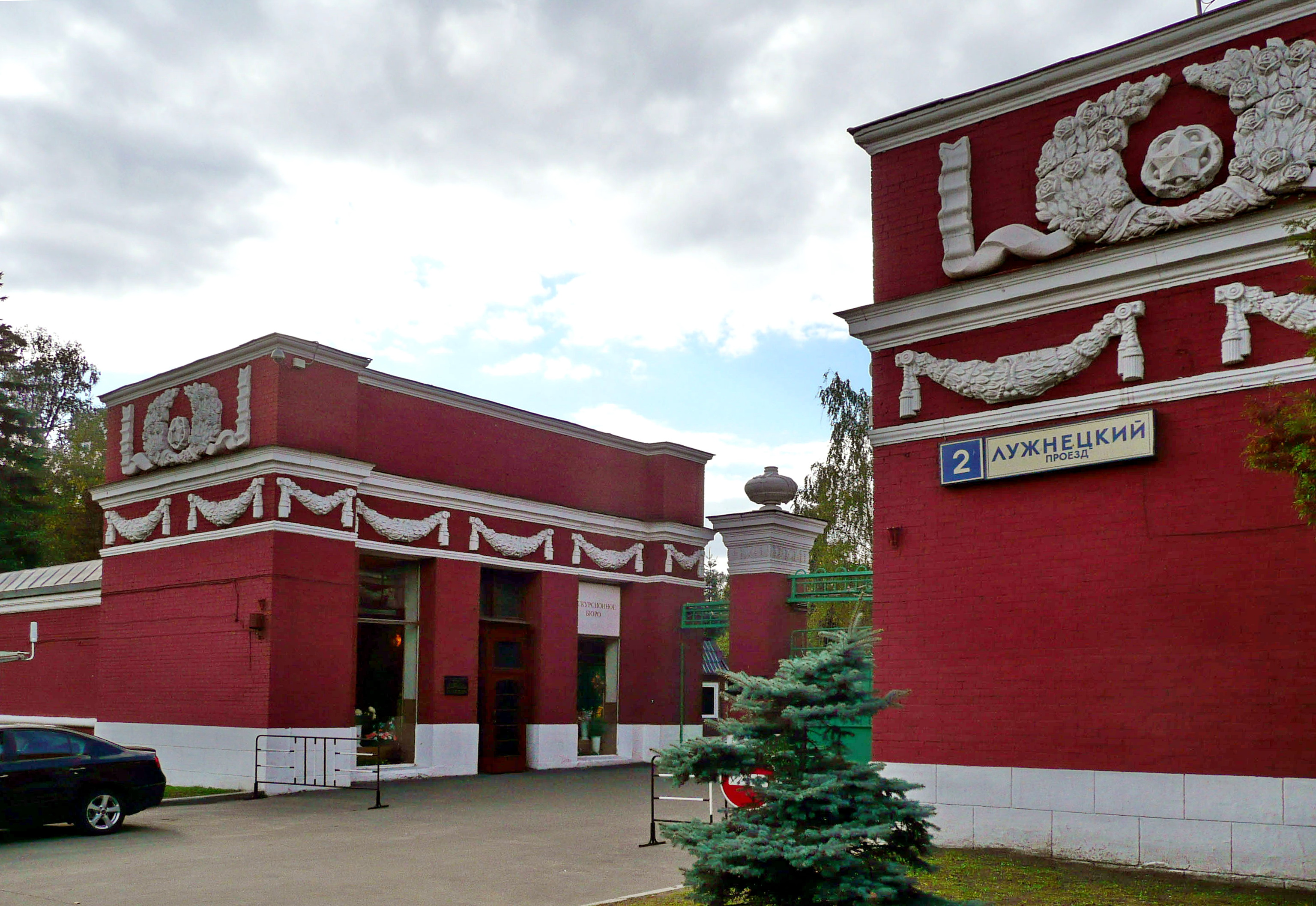
Entrance to Novodevichy Cemetery where David Ivon Jones was buried.

After his death from tuberculosis on 13 April 1924, Jones was buried in Moscow's famous Novodevichy Cemetery, as a reward by Russian communists for his commitment to socialism. Later, buried alongside him were two former leaders of the Communist Party of South Africa, JB Marks and Moses Kotane. There is also a memorial dedicated to Jones in Aberystwyth's Unitarian chapel.

According to historian Baruch Hirson, Jones's early Welsh nationalism and love of Welsh literature gave him a "life-long hatred of tyranny and national oppression".

In 2005, a motion was put forward to the UK Parliament to recognise Jones's dedication to improving the working conditions of South African workers. This motion was signed by 33 Members of Parliament, including Jeremy Corbyn.

Shortly after Nelson Mandela's death in 2013, a remembrance service was held for David Ivon Jones, praising him for his fight against apartheid and recognising that Mandela's struggle against apartheid was a continuation of Jones's struggle for racial equality in South Africa.

In 2015, a delegation of 20 representatives of the South African embassy and government visited Novodevichy cemetery to return the remains of Marks and Kotane to South Africa, as requested by their surviving families. While in the cemetery, the delegation also paid their respects to the grave of David Ivon Jones.

In 2015, Jones was voted 30th of the "50 most influential Welsh politicians of all time" in a poll by readers of Wales Online.

His legacy is highly regarded by both the African National Congress, and the Communist Party of South Africa.

According to the Marxist newspaper People's World, the ISL that Jones led would later become the nucleus of the Communist Party of South Africa, which would recognise Jones as a founding member.

A biography of Jones was written by Professor Gwyn Alf Williams and Baruch Hirson, and published in 1995. Archival papers relevant to the study of David Ivon Jones can be found at Swansea University.

== Works ==
- The Bolsheviks are Coming! (1919)
- Bolshevism and Church Property (1922)
- Africa Awakening (1923)
- Lenin's First Book (1924)

== See also ==
- Claudia Jones
- Vic Allen
- Paul Robeson
- Kwame Nkrumah
- Harry Pollitt
- Nelson Mandela
