= Mary Fitzgerald (trade unionist) =

Irish-born South African political activist and trade unionist

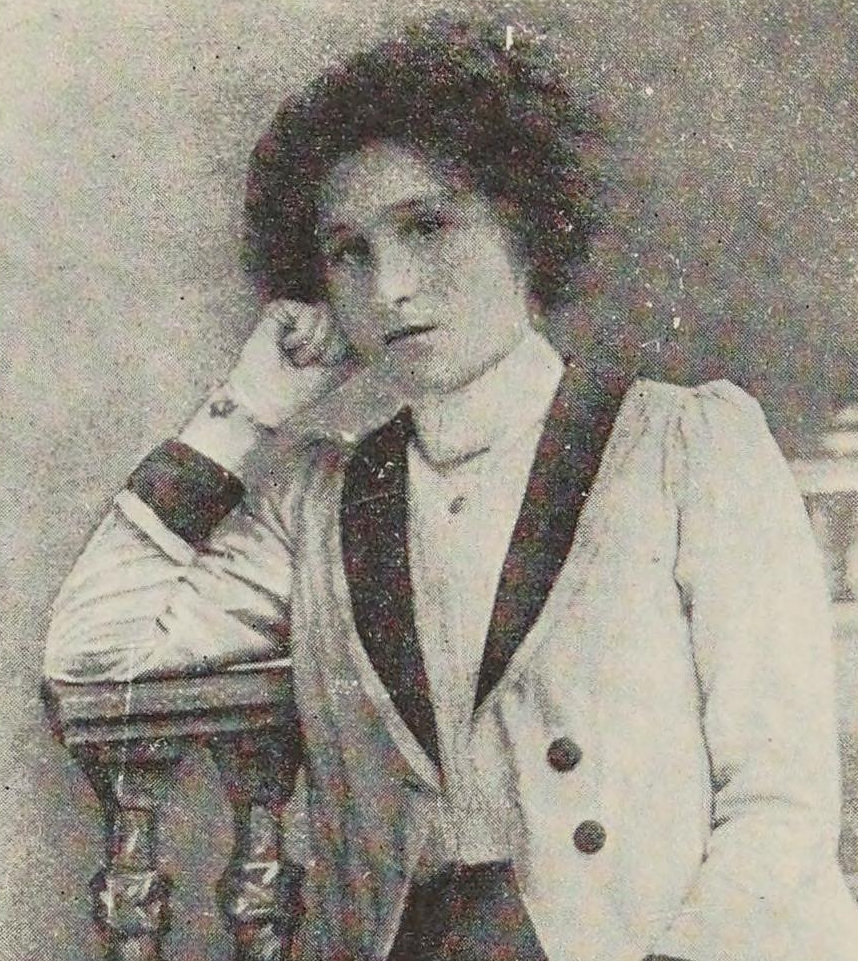
- Fitzgerald c. 1911
- Born: Mary Sinnott; 4 August 1883; Gortins, Cleariestown, County Wexford, Ireland
- Died: 26 September 1960 (aged 77); Johannesburg, South Africa
- Other name: Pickhandle Mary
- Occupation: Trade unionist

Mary Fitzgerald (also known as Pickhandle Mary; 4 August 1883 – 26 September 1960) was an Irish-born South African political activist and was considered to have been the first female trade unionist in the country. She was South Africa's first female master printer. As editor of the Voice of Labour, she published articles advocating for women's enfranchisement, racially integrated trade unions and revolutionary socialism. She played a lead role in the Black Friday Riots of 1913. She was the first woman to be elected to the Johannesburg City Council (JCC) in 1915 and later served as Deputy Mayor of Johannesburg.

== Early life ==
Mary was born into a farming family in the townland of Gortins, near Cleariestown, County Wexford in 1883. Her parents were Thomas Sinnott and Margaret Dunne. They had four other children: Dennis who was born in 1880, Doris and Sarah who were born in 1886, and Barbara. Mary attended the Presentation Convent in Wexford, where she qualified as a shorthand typist.

Her father Thomas travelled to America and got a job as a representative for the Singer Sewing Machine Company. Three months later, he moved to rapidly growing Cape Town as the company representative. In 1900 he returned to Wexford and travelled back to Cape Town with Mary, with plans that the rest of the family would follow.

== Career and family life ==
At first, Mary found a job working at British military headquarters as one of the first female shorthand typists in South Africa. Her mother and siblings sailed from Southampton to the Cape in December 1900. Margaret Sinnott started work as a dressmaker on her sewing machine while Dennis got a job on the tramways.

Everything was going well for the new immigrant family until Dennis had a fall from the top of a tram and died of his injuries. His tram conductor friend John Fitzgerald visited the bereaved family. John and Mary married in St. Mary's Cathedral and went on to have five children.

=== Trade unionism ===
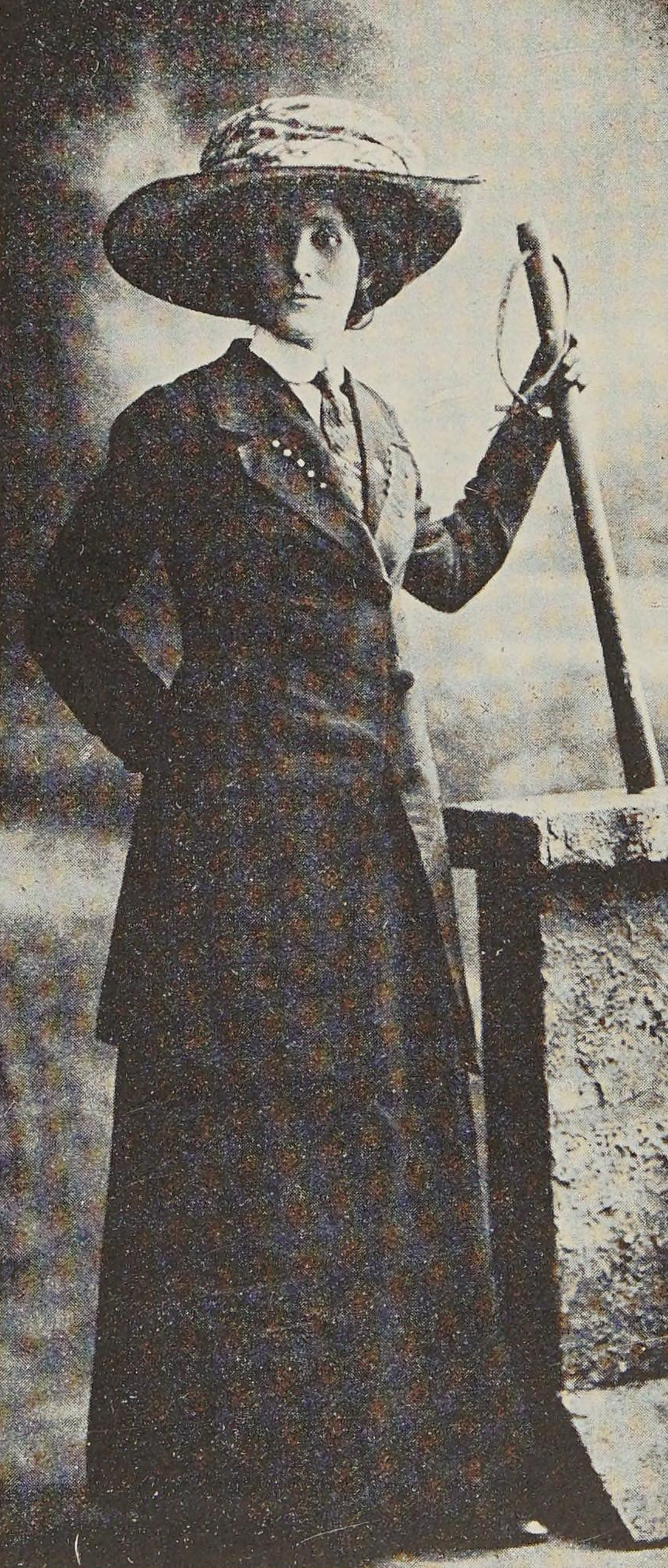
Fitzgerald c. 1912

The Sinnotts and Fitzgeralds later moved to Johannesburg. Mary Fitzgerald became a typist for the Mine Workers Union which was known as South African Mine Workers Union. She witnessed the appalling conditions of the miners and soon became actively involved speaking herself at union gatherings. Though a short, quietly-spoken woman she captivated her audience with her oration. She developed a firm friendship with suffragette Nina Boyle and became a pioneer in organising unions for women and in the fight for women's votes and for equality of pay and opportunity.

Fitzgerald trained as a printer and became South Africa's first female master printer. She co-owned a printing plant where she printed and edited a radical publication known as The Voice of Labour, which advocated for workers' rights. She also co-edited the pioneering feminist journal, Modern Woman in South Africa, under the auspices of the Women's Enfranchisement League.

Fitzgerald supported the Industrial Workers of the World (IWW), an international labour movement advocating "revolutionary industrial unionism", syndicalism and racial integration of trade unions. She was involved in two Johannesburg tramway strikes in 1911. The strikers sat on tramlines to stop scab drivers from leaving the depots. Mounted police carrying pickhandles tried to quell the crowd in Market Square but when the police dropped some of their pickhandles in the battle, the crowd took possession of them. They carried these to protest meetings, with Mary earning the nickname "Pickhandle Mary". Other sources attribute the name to an incident in the same year, when a group of protesting women broke into a hardware store armed with pick handles. Fitzgerald was involved in many other strikes in Johannesburg leading her "pickhandle brigade" to break up anti-union meetings.

Fitzgerald played a lead role during the Black Friday riots in 1913. On 4 July 1913, the government declared martial law after 18, 000 miners had stopped work. A mass meeting in Johannesburg's Market Square was attacked by 4,000 policemen and British troops. They were driven back by a barrage of broken bottles, stones and tin cans. As the Royal Dragoons charged the crowd on horseback, Fitzgerald stood on an oil drum and appealed to the crowd to resist. Her female commandos surged into the cleared space to rally their menfolk who were starting to leave the square. Fitzgerald became separated from the crowd and pinned between a mounted Dragoon Commandant's horse and a wall. She took a big hat pin from her hat and drove it into the horse, which ran away.

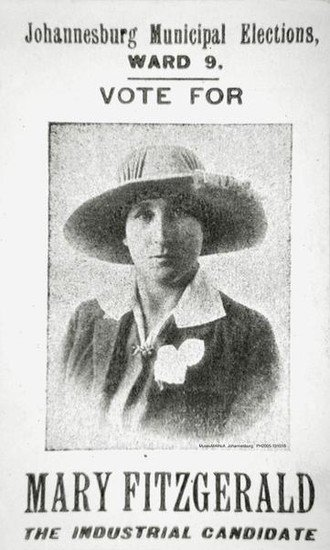
Fitzgerald on a 1915 election poster

In the first elections for the Johannesburg municipality in 1915, Mary was elected to the city council and served until 1921. She was the first woman to hold public office in the city. She later served as Deputy Mayor of Johannesburg.

In 1918, she founded the Women's Industrial League (WIL), an organisation of waitresses, hospital laundry workers, and female workers in the Pretoria mint. WIL members were involved in expelling "coloured" waiters from a Johannesburg social club and forcing management to hire white women.

She attended the 1921 conference of the International Labour Organisation (ILO) in Geneva as a delegate of the South African government.

She was arrested in 1922 for allegedly leading a group that set fire to Park Station during the Mine Workers Strike.

=== Retirement from public life ===
In 1918 she divorced John Fitzgerald and married labour leader Archie Crawford in 1919. They had one child also named Archie. Her husband Archie died in 1924 and she did not take part in public life after 1926.

On her retirement she was presented with a car bought by public donations, the first to be owned and driven by a Johannesburg woman.

== Death and legacy ==
Fitzgerald died in 1960 at the age of 77.

In 1939, Market Square in Newtown, Johannesburg was renamed Mary Fitzgerald Square. The pickhandle she is said to have used is on display in Museum Africa, which is located on the square.

In 2005, Mary Fitzgerald Square hosted the Johannesburg leg of the Live 8 series of concerts organised by Bob Geldof and the square was officially designated a ‘fan park’ during the 2010 World Cup.

'Mama Mary Fitzgerald' was posthumously awarded The Order of Luthuli (Silver) by the Presidency of the Republic of South Africa in 2018. The Order of Luthuli is awarded to South Africans who have made a meaningful contribution in the struggle for democracy, human rights, nation-building, justice, peace and conflict resolution.
