= Reformed Industrial Commercial Union =

Trade Union

- Abbreviation: RICU
- Predecessor: Industrial and Commercial Workers' Union
- Formation: 1946; 80 years ago
- Founder: Charles Mzingeli
- Dissolved: c. 1957; 69 years ago
- Type: Trade union
- Purpose: Syndicalism; African nationalism
- Secretary: Patrick Pazarangu
- Treasurer: George Nyandoro

The Reformed Industrial Commercial Union (RICU) was a trade union in Southern Rhodesia during the 1940s and 1950s.

== History ==
The RICU was founded in 1946 by Charles Mzingeli, who had previously been active in the Southern Rhodesian branch of the Industrial and Commercial Workers' Union. Formed at a time when trade unions were banned from organising black African workers, the RICU was generally more militant than other black African nationalist organisations at the time, such as the African National Congress. The RICU was active in agitating for improved housing, wages and living standards for the black urban populations in major centres, such as Salisbury and Bulawayo, and was instrumental in opposing the Native (Urban Areas) Accommodation and Registration Act of 1946. The RICU helped organise the African General Strike of 1948 in Bulawayo. The RICU was also opposed to the establishment of the Federation of Rhodesia and Nyasaland, fearing it would further cement white minority rule.

The RICU, through Mzingeli, was involved in the campaign led by the Inter-racial Association of Southern Rhodesia (IASR) to amend the Industrial Conciliation Act of 1934 to allow the formation of multi-racial and African trade unions.

The Secretary of the RICU was Patrick Pazarangu. The treasurer in 1951 was George Nyandoro, who later led the All-African Convention in 1952.

The position of the RICU as the leading black African nationalist organisation in Southern Rhodesia was supplanted in the 1950s by more militant groups such as the City Youth League and Southern Rhodesia African National Congress (SRANC).
