= Industrial and Commercial Workers' Union =

South African trade union, 1919–1930s

ICU
- Industrial and Commercial Workers' Union
- Predecessor: Industrial Workers of the World
- Successor: Reformed Industrial Commercial Union (in Southern Rhodesia)
- Founded: 1919
- Dissolved: 1930s
- Type: Trade union
- Purpose: Syndicalism

The Industrial and Commercial Workers' Union (ICU) was a trade union and mass-based popular political movement in southern Africa. It was influenced by the syndicalist politics of the Industrial Workers of the World (adopting the IWW Preamble in 1925), as well as by Garveyism, Christianity, communism, and liberalism.

== Origins ==
The original ICU was founded in Cape Town in 1919. Later that year it held a famous joint strike on the docks with the syndicalist Industrial Workers of Africa, a black-based union modelled on the syndicalist Industrial Workers of the World. In 1920, the two unions merged with a number of other emergent African and Coloured-based unions into an expanded ICU with the stated aim of "creating one great union" of workers south of the Zambezi river i.e. spanning South Africa, South West Africa, Northern Rhodesia and Southern Rhodesia. The first journal of the ICWU, Black Man, ran for six issues in 1920.

The ICU has been described as "one of the most radical movements ever seen in Southern Africa." Visiting American and Caribbean sailors played a key role in the introduction of both Garveyite and syndicalist ideas. The ICU remained active in Zimbabwe into the 1950s as the Reformed Industrial Commercial Union (RICU), but had declined elsewhere by the end of the 1930s.

== Development and collapse ==
The ICU spread into South West Africa (modern-day Namibia) in 1920, Southern Rhodesia (modern-day Zimbabwe) in 1927, and Northern Rhodesia (modern-day Zambia) in 1931. For its early years, however, South Africa was its stronghold.

The South African ICU was a general union, with a loose structure. Its operations were largely based in black urban communities and on farms, and its social base was a mixture of workers, sharecroppers and other tenant farmers, and the downwardly mobile black middle class. The ICU experienced explosive rural growth, so that by 1927 it could boast a membership of 100,000, making it one of the largest trade unions ever to have taken root in Africa before the 1970s. No movement before or since has succeeded in mobilising the South African rural poor on such a scale. While its base was increasingly rural, it also managed to make inroads into urban black communities, notably in Durban on a large scale.

The ICU's ideology was an unstable mixture, and the movement developed highly unevenly. At times, ICU leaders promoted a radical vision of workers and tenant farmers taking over white farms. In the late 1920s the movement took on a millenarian aspect in the rural Eastern Cape where predictions of airborne liberation by African Americans captured the imagination of thousands of people. Yet the ICU also made extensive, and often successful, use of the (white-run) courts. In the late 1920s, the South African ICU briefly sought to reposition itself as a moderate, orthodox trade union.

There was some overlap of membership between the ICU and the then-moderate (and tiny) African National Congress, but the two bodies were often rivals, despite several ICU attempts to influence Congress. Members of the Communist Party of South Africa played an important role in the early ICU, but were expelled in 1926.

By the late 1920s the South African ICU faced severe repression, especially the eviction of activists from white farms and laws enabling crackdowns on key figures. This repression was enabled by the Industrial Conciliation Act, 1924, which exempted non-whites from labor laws and refused them legal recognition as employees. Meanwhile, the union had severe internal weaknesses, including unaccountable leaders, corruption and a lack of clear strategy. In 1928 the union was still able to play a major role in the famous women's beer hall boycott in Durban, where in the 1930s the union had its own hall in Prince Edward Street in Durban, and undertook mass marches through the suburb of Sydenham.

The Zimbabwean ICU faced similar challenges, but grew quite rapidly into the 1930s, emerging as a major black political force. Like the South African ICU, it had a large rural base, as well as an influence in black urban areas. It experienced some decline, but continued to operate in the form of the Reformed ICU into the mid-1950s. In Zambia, ICU groups were active from 1931, but never attained the size and power of the two southern ICUs. In Namibia, the ICU was mainly active in the port town of Lüderitz.

In 1935 Rachel Simons was the secretary of the union.

Contemporary analysts and currents sympathetic to an autonomous and self-directed politics of the poor are increasingly revisiting the history of the ICU.
